= 1938–39 Oshkosh All-Stars season =

NBL professional basketball team season

- Division champions
- Head coach: George Hotchkiss
- General manager: Lon Darling
- Owner: Lon Darling
- Arena: South Park School Gymnasium

Results
- Record: 17–11 (.607)
- Place: Division: 1st (Western)
- Playoff finish: Lost NBL Championship to Akron Firestone Non-Skids, 3–2; Lost WPBT Championship match 34–25 to the New York Renaissance

The 1938–39 Oshkosh All-Stars season was the All-Stars' second professional year in the United States' National Basketball League (NBL), which was also the second year the league existed. However, if one were to include the independent seasons they played starting all the way back in 1929 before beginning to join the NBL in 1937 as the last inaugural NBL team to enter the new league, this would officially be their ninth season of play instead. The All-Stars played their home games at the South Park School Gymnasium in the South Park Middle School within the Oshkosh Area School District.

This season would see them begin a special rivalry with another team in the state of Wisconsin, as the nearby Sheboygan Red Skins would join the NBL on December 31, 1938 under team owner Lon Darling's approval to help field a more evened up eight teams for the NBL's season (with most of the teams that had played matches against Sheboygan beforehand retroactively having their matches count as scheduled NBL games, with last-minute adjustments also being made for every NBL team's schedules going forward as well). Their rivalry with each other would continue to last for ten more seasons after this season concluded. During this period of time, Oshkosh would see themselves slip up a bit more when compared to what they had done from their previous season in the NBL. However, despite playing in less overall games this season when compared to their previous season (Oshkosh would finish their season with a 31–15 record before beginning playoff competition, with a majority of their defeats coming from NBL scheduled matches), they would still finish the season with a very good 17–11 record, which would not only be the best record in the Western Division, but also allowed them to automatically qualify for the NBL's championship series match-up against the Akron Firestone Non-Skids (which essentially was the 1939 NBL Playoffs this time around). Despite putting up a very good fight throughout the championship series, Oshkosh would ultimately lose the championship 3–2 to the Akron Firestone Non-Skids, who had only lost 3 total games that season in the NBL before entering the championship series. For the second straight season, Leroy Edwards would be named the NBL's MVP, with it also being the second of six seasons (five straight in a row) where he would be named a member of the All-NBL First Team and the second of many seasons (outside of some exhibition games in their previous two seasons as a barnstorming franchise) where Leroy Edwards would play with the Oshkosh All-Stars in the NBL.

In addition to the NBL Playoffs (which was just the championship series this season), the Oshkosh All-Stars would also compete in the 1939 World Professional Basketball Tournament, which was a new tournament set up as a way to officially determine who would be the best professional basketball team in the U.S.A. throughout this early period of time. Due to the awkward formatting of the tournament with 13 teams competing (which included the Sheboygan Red Skins as competition), after Oshkosh had won their first round match-up against the Clarksburg Oil team, they would be awarded a quarterfinal bye (which was the only time a team was given a bye in the quarterfinal round through the tournament's entire history). Following that weird moment, the All-Stars would be given their first playoff-style match-up against the Sheboygan Red Skins in what could be considered the "Battle for Wisconsin", in which Oshkosh would demolish Sheboygan in a 40–23 victory for a chance to potentially win the inaugural tournament's championship. Unfortunately for Oshkosh, they would meet up against the determined powerhouse known as the New York Renaissance (an all-black team that was 109–7 up until the championship match-up) that wanted to break the season's tiebreaker against them, which they did by winning the championship match 34–25, which crowned the Renaissance as the inaugural WPBT champions.

== Roster ==
1938–39 Oshkosh All-Stars roster
Players

Pos.	No.	Player	Height	Weight	DOB	From
F/C		Ray Adams	6 ft 2 in (1.88 m)	185 lb (84 kg)	1912–09–28	DePaul
F/C		Scott Armstrong	6 ft 4 in (1.93 m)	190 lb (86 kg)	1913–10–12	Butler
C		Byron Bell	6 ft 3 in (1.91 m)	180 lb (82 kg)	1914–06–09	Wisconsin
F		Emmet Birk	6 ft 1 in (1.85 m)	185 lb (84 kg)	1914–03–21	North Dakota
F		Dave Dupree	6 ft 3 in (1.91 m)	185 lb (84 kg)	1916–03–30	Wisconsin
C		Leroy Edwards	6 ft 5 in (1.96 m)	210 lb (95 kg)	1914–04–11	Kentucky
G/F		Ray Hamann	6 ft 4 in (1.93 m)	205 lb (93 kg)	1911–08–19	Wisconsin
G		Frank Linskey	6 ft 2 in (1.88 m)	180 lb (82 kg)	1913–08–18	DePaul
G		Ed Mullen	6 ft 3 in (1.91 m)	185 lb (84 kg)	1914–03–09	Marquette
F		Pete Preboske	6 ft 1 in (1.85 m)	195 lb (88 kg)	1914–01–21	Wisconsin
C		Augie Vander Meulen	6 ft 4 in (1.93 m)	175 lb (79 kg)	1909–11–06	Carroll College
G		Bob Weigandt	5 ft 10 in (1.78 m)	190 lb (86 kg)	1914–02–05	Wisconsin
G/F		Herm Witasek	6 ft 2 in (1.88 m)	210 lb (95 kg)	1913–10–16	North Dakota

Coaches
Head coach
- George Hotchkiss

Legend
- (DP) Unsigned draft pick
- (FA) Free agent
- (S) Suspended
- Injured

Roster

== Regular season ==
=== Season standings ===
Pos.	Western Division	Wins	Losses	Win %
1	Oshkosh All-Stars	17	11	.607
2	Indianapolis Kautskys	13	13	.500
3	Sheboygan Red Skins	11	17	.393
4	Hammond Ciesar All-Americans	4	24	.143

=== NBL Schedule ===
- November 26, 1938 @ Oshkosh, WI: Pittsburgh Pirates 33, Oshkosh All-Stars 55
- December 3, 1938: Warren Penns 38, Oshkosh All-Stars 37 (OT @ Oshkosh, WI)
- December 10, 1938 @ Oshkosh, WI: Akron Goodyear Wingfoots 30, Oshkosh All-Stars 26
- December 23, 1938 @ Oshkosh, WI: Pittsburgh Pirates 29, Oshkosh All-Stars 36
- December 29, 1938 @ Oshkosh, WI: Indianapolis Kautskys 51, Oshkosh All-Stars 46
- January 7, 1939 @ Oshkosh, WI: Hammond Ciesar All-Americans 28, Oshkosh All-Stars 53
- January 9, 1939 @ Milwaukee, WI: Sheboygan Red Skins 33, Oshkosh All-Stars 36
- January 14, 1939 @ Oshkosh, WI: Akron Firestone Non-Skids 46, Oshkosh All-Stars 44
- January 15, 1939 @ Hammond, IN: Oshkosh All-Stars 64, Hammond Ciesar All-Americans 40
- January 18, 1939 @ Sheboygan, WI: Oshkosh All-Stars 44, Sheboygan Red Skins 40
- January 22, 1939 @ Akron, OH: Oshkosh All-Stars 41, Akron Firestone Non-Skids 46
- January 23, 1939 @ Indianapolis, IN: Oshkosh All-Stars 24, Indianapolis Kautskys 25
- January 24, 1939 @ Akron, OH: Oshkosh All-Stars 34, Akron Goodyear Wingfoots 22
- January 25, 1939 @ Pittsburgh, PA: Oshkosh All-Stars 36, Pittsburgh Pirates 46
- January 26, 1939 @ Warren, PA: Oshkosh All-Stars 39, Warren Penns 43
- February 2, 1939 @ Oshkosh, WI: Akron Goodyear Wingfoots 34, Oshkosh All-Stars 36
- February 4, 1939 @ Oshkosh, WI: Indianapolis Kautskys 45, Oshkosh All-Stars 57
- February 13, 1939 @ Indianapolis, IN: Oshkosh All-Stars 47, Indianapolis Kautskys 25
- February 15, 1939 @ Sheboygan, WI: Oshkosh All-Stars 28, Sheboygan Red Skins 25
- February 18, 1939 @ Oshkosh, WI: Hammond Ciesar All-Americans 36, Oshkosh All-Stars 42
- February 23, 1939 @ Oshkosh, WI: Sheboygan Red Skins 36, Oshkosh All-Stars 49
- February 26, 1939 @ Hammond, IN: Oshkosh All-Stars 23, Hammond Ciesar All-Americans 28
- February 27, 1939 @ Akron, OH: Oshkosh All-Stars 51, Akron Firestone Non-Skids 57
- February 28, 1939: Oshkosh All-Stars 28, Cleveland White Horses 30 (2OT @ Cleveland, OH)
- March 1, 1939 @ Pittsburgh, PA: Oshkosh All-Stars 43, Pittsburgh Pirates 40
- March 2, 1939 @ Akron, OH: Oshkosh All-Stars 34, Akron Goodyear Wingfoots 22
- March 4, 1939 @ Oshkosh, WI: Akron Firestone Non-Skids 42, Oshkosh All-Stars 49
- March 11, 1939 @ Oshkosh, WI: Cleveland White Horses 39, Oshkosh All-Stars 43

== NBL Playoffs ==
The NBL Playoffs for this season would only contain a best of five championship series with the two best teams in each division competing against each other for the NBL Championship this season. This means that it would be the 17–11 Oshkosh All-Stars in the Western Division going up against the 24–3 Akron Firestone Non-Skids in the Eastern Division as the sole playoff series for the NBL this season.

=== NBL Championship ===
(1W) Oshkosh All-Stars vs. (1E) Akron Firestone Non-Skids: Akron wins series 3–2

- Game 1: March 14, 1939 @ Akron: Akron 50, Oshkosh 38
- Game 2: March 15, 1939 @ Akron: Oshkosh 38, Akron 36
- Game 3: March 17, 1939 @ Oshkosh: Akron 40, Oshkosh 29
- Game 4: March 18, 1939 @ Oshkosh: Oshkosh 49, Akron 37
- Game 5: March 20, 1939 @ Oshkosh: Akron 37, Oshkosh 30

=== Awards and honors ===
- NBL scoring leader – Leroy Edwards
- NBL Most Valuable Player – Leroy Edwards
- All-NBL First Team – Leroy Edwards
- NBL All-Time Team – Leroy Edwards

== World Professional Basketball Tournament ==
For the first time ever, the World Professional Basketball Tournament, an annual basketball tournament held in Chicago, would begin operations in what would be an annual event for a decade-long process (lasting nearly as long as the rest of the NBL's lifespan). With the first ever tournament held for this event, the only NBL teams participating in this event would be the Oshkosh All-Stars and in-state rivaling Sheboygan Red Skins (the only new NBL team of the season) for the inaugural 1939 event that was held on March 26–28, 1939 and was mostly held by independently ran teams alongside the Troy Celtics of the rivaling American Basketball League. (Originally, the Philadelphia Sphas team that was also from the rivaling American Basketball League were intended to also join the WPBT as the other ABL team participating in the event, but due to them being too injured to participate, they were replaced with the Illinois Grads team involving college graduate students that played basketball in nearby Champagne, Illinois.) Due to the odd number of teams participating in this event this year (eleven total teams, likely due to the ABL's Philadelphia Sphas being replaced with the Illinois Grads), the WPBT were forced to implement a unique system of sorts where three teams were given a bye in the first round and one team was given a bye in the quarterfinal round only. Because the first round byes were given to the Chicago Harmons (who were actually the former ABL team and future NBL team known as the Chicago Bruins under a different name for this event), the ABL's Troy Celtics, and the Hall of Fame worthy all-black New York Renaissance, the All-Stars were forced to play their first match of the event under the opening round against the Clarksburg Oil team (which are sometimes referred to as the Clarksburg Oilers instead) that was held in Clarksburg, West Virginia. In the first round, Oshkosh would barely skirt by against Clarksburg with a 40–33 victory in the All-Stars' favor, with their inspiration for the victory coming from seeing four former Oshkosh players (Branch McCracken, Harold E. Foster, Charlie "Feed" Murphy, and Bill Mangan) cheering them on alongside Leroy Edwards' college head coach, Adolph Rupp. When they entered the quarterfinal round, however, it was revealed that the Oshkosh All-Stars themselves were given a quarterfinal round bye, making them the only team to qualify for the semifinal round by default in the WPBT's entire history. After resting up for the semifinal round matchup, Oshkosh would go up against their in-state rivals (and the only other NBL team competing in the event this time around) in the Sheboygan Red Skins. In what would become the first of many playoff match-ups between Oshkosh and Sheboygan (either in the NBL Playoffs or the WPBT's history), Frank Linskey would lead Oshkosh with a game-high 12 points to blowout Sheboygan through a 40–23 blowout victory to allow the All-Stars the chance to win the inaugural WPBT championship while also representing the NBL.

For the championship match-up, they would go up against the all-black New York Renaissance, who had an overall record of 109–7 by this point in time and turned out to hold a more recent, heated history of matches between each other (the 1935–36 season had the Rens beat Oshkosh 3–2, while Oshkosh beat New York 4–3 and 6–2 in the next two seasons afterward before being tied 1–1 up until this point in time), with this championship match being a deciding match-up between the two teams for this season. Despite having a major presence as a team due to them having a competitive edge as a professional basketball franchise, the All-Stars would end up being too tired to compete properly against the Renaissance, which led to them losing 25–34 for the inaugural WPBT championship match. Due to the fact that the all-black New York Renaissance had won the WPBT instead of the all-white Oshkosh All-Stars, not too many news outlets would report on the inaugural WPBT's final results in a proper manner, with those that did ultimately being newspapers that were considered to be for African American readers instead. However, public results would showcase that Leroy Edwards was the leading scorer for Oshkosh with 12 points scored that night (though not much offense was being provided elsewhere for the team outside of Scott Armstrong scoring 7 points for that match, with Frank Linskey and Pete Preboske being the only other players to score that night with 3 points each), while Pop Gates led the Renaissance with 12 points scored that night under a more balanced offensive effort (with everyone on that team outside of Zack Clayton making at least one basket) by comparison. While the Renaissance would consider the grand prize given out to them a rip-off of sorts (with the $1,000 grand prize really being $1,000 total being given out to the entire team as opposed to being for each player on the team), the team would later be given jackets that said "World's Colored Champions 1939", with John Isaacs cutting out the word "Colored" on his jacket to showcase that they were true champions that season instead of just "colored" champions. The Renaissance later finished their season with a 112–7 record following the conclusion of the inaugural WPBT, while Oshkosh would have another disappointing conclusion close out their season properly.

=== Games ===
- Won the first round (40–33) over the Clarksburg Oil.
- Oshkosh had a bye in the quarterfinal round. (Was the only time in WPBT history a team was given a quarterfinal round bye.)
- Won semifinal round (40–23) over the Sheboygan Red Skins.
- Lost championship round (25–34) to the New York Renaissance.

=== Awards and honors ===
- Leroy Edwards, All-Tournament Team, WPBT leading scorer (49 points scored in three games)
