= 1940–41 Chicago Bruins season =

NBL professional basketball team season

- Head coach: Frank Linskey (player-coach)
- Owner(s): George Halas; Charles Bidwill
- Arena: 132nd Regiment Armory

Results
- Record: 11–13 (.458)
- Place: Division: T–5th (tied with Akron Goodyear Wingfoots)
- Playoff finish: Did not qualify

The 1940–41 Chicago Bruins season was the Bruins' second season of existence when playing professionally for the National Basketball League (though not their second professional basketball season as a whole), which officially was the fourth season the NBL existed as a professional basketball league after previously existing as a semi-pro or amateur basketball league called the Midwest Basketball Conference in its first two seasons back in 1935. The reason why this is not the second professional basketball season the Bruins ever had as a franchise throughout their history was because they had originally existed as a professional basketball team in the original rendition of the American Basketball League that had existed from 1925 to 1931 before the Great Depression caused a hiatus on the ABL in order for it to return a couple of years later on a smaller basis (and minus the Bruins) in 1933, years before the NBL or even its predecessor in the Midwest Basketball Conference were even created. As such, if we include their original six ABL years alongside the potential independent seasons of play (including the season where they played as the Chicago Harmons in the inaugural World Professional Basketball Tournament) and their first NBL season, this would, at the very least, be their ninth (or more (potentially going up to what would be their eighteenth)) season of play. Entering this season, the Bruins would be one of only seven teams competing in the NBL this season in its first season without divisional play, as the Indianapolis Kautskys temporarily left the NBL to experiment with themselves as a barnstorming franchise, with the Detroit Eagles initially declaring they would not be in the NBL this season at first due to arena and ownership issues before later resolutions with them allowed them to return to the NBL with relative ease.

Early on in this season (which did not commence until December 18 for them due to the 132nd Regiment Armory's court being remodeled at the time), the Bruins looked to be strong contenders for not just winning the Western Division, but also the actual NBL Championship for this season following not just their performance in the 1940 World Professional Basketball Tournament, but also the first couple of games to start the season as well. However, the games they lost in the 1940 year would turn out to be greatly consequential for the Bruins the further they got along into their second season in the NBL. While Chicago would not continue starting out their season as strongly as they did the previous season, they still appeared to have a solid chance of debuting in the NBL Playoffs for this season due to them having an 8–8 record at one point in the season. However, four straight, crucial losses following this period led to team owner George Halas purchasing Ralph Vaughn from the Hammond Ciesar All-Americans (who waived him for both economic and disciplinary reasons and being considered the biggest purchase for a player at a time since George Halas previously purchased Nat Holman back in the original ABL's days) in the hopes of having one last chance of helping the Bruins steal a playoff spot from either the Detroit Eagles or one of the works teams from Akron held by Firestone and Goodyear. However, Vaughn's impact would prove to be minimal for the franchise by comparison, as while the Bruins won the final three out of four games for the season for an 11–13 record, the games they would win to close out the season would not be enough to steal a playoff spot away, as they would be one game shy from a tied record with the Detroit Eagles for a fourth-place finish, meaning they would end up being tied for a fifth-place finish with the Akron Goodyear Wingfoots instead. Not only that, but their following appearance in the 1941 World Professional Basketball Tournament would also result in a disappointing result as well, since they ended up being upset in the quarterfinal round to the Toledo White Huts, who later joined the NBL as the Toledo Jim White Chevrolets.

Despite the second straight disappointing finish the Bruins had in the NBL, the Bruins would see all three of Bill Hapac, Wibs Kautz, and Ralph Vaughn become members of the All-NBL Second Team, though Ralph Vaughn's case would primarily relate with his time spent with the Hammond Ciesar All-Americans this season instead of the Chicago Bruins.

== Roster ==
Please note that due to the way records for professional basketball leagues like the NBL and the ABL were recorded at the time, some information on both teams and players may be harder to list out than usual here.

| Player | Position |
|---|---|
| Ray Adams | F-C |
| Herb Ball | G-F |
| Bill Hapac | G-F |
| George Hogan | G-F |
| Elmer Johnson | F-C |
| Wibs Kautz | G-F |
| Frank Linskey | G-F |
| Vince McGowan | F-C |
| Bill O’Brien | F |
| Mike Novak | C |
| Stan Szukala | G |
| Ralph Vaughn | G-F |

== Regular season ==
=== Season standings ===
| Pos. | League Standings | Wins | Losses | Win % |
|---|---|---|---|---|
| 1 | Oshkosh All-Stars | 18 | 6 | .750 |
| T–2 | Sheboygan Red Skins | 13 | 11 | .542 |
| T–2 | Akron Firestone Non-Skids | 13 | 11 | .542 |
| 4 | Detroit Eagles | 12 | 12 | .500 |
| T–5 | Chicago Bruins | 11 | 13 | .458 |
| T–5 | Akron Goodyear Wingfoots | 11 | 13 | .458 |
| 7 | Hammond Ciesar All-Americans | 6 | 18 | .250 |

=== NBL Schedule ===
Not to be confused with exhibition or other non-NBL scheduled games that did not count towards Chicago's official NBL record for this season. An official database created by John Grasso detailing every NBL match possible (outside of two matches that the Kankakee Gallagher Trojans won over the Dayton Metropolitans in 1938) would be released in 2026 showcasing every team's official schedules throughout their time spent in the NBL. As such, these are the official results recorded for the Chicago Bruins during their second season out in the NBL.

- December 18, 1940 @ Chicago, IL: Akron Firestone Non-Skids 36, Chicago Bruins 44
- December 19, 1940 @ Sheboygan, WI: Chicago Bruins 27, Sheboygan Red Skins 20
- December 22, 1940 @ Hammond, IN: Chicago Bruins 33, Hammond Ciesar All-Americans 41
- December 25, 1940 @ Chicago, IL: Hammond Ciesar All-Americans 46, Chicago Bruins 50
- December 27, 1940 @ Akron, OH: Chicago Bruins 45, Akron Firestone Non-Skids 46
- December 28, 1940 @ Akron, OH: Chicago Bruins 38, Akron Goodyear Wingfoots 40
- January 1, 1941 @ Chicago, IL: Sheboygan Red Skins 34, Chicago Bruins 32
- January 8, 1941 @ Chicago, IL: Detroit Eagles 30, Chicago Bruins 39
- January 11, 1941 @ Oshkosh, WI: Chicago Bruins 36, Oshkosh All-Stars 43
- January 15, 1941: Akron Goodyear Wingfoots 44, Chicago Bruins 38 (OT @ Chicago, IL)
- January 17, 1941 @ Detroit, MI: Chicago Bruins 43, Detroit Eagles 45
- January 22, 1941 @ Chicago, IL: Oshkosh All-Stars 32, Chicago Bruins 34
- January 26, 1941 @ Hammond, IN: Chicago Bruins 43, Hammond Ciesar All-Americans 33
- January 29, 1941 @ Chicago, IL: Sheboygan Red Skins 22, Chicago Bruins 31
- January 30, 1941 @ Sheboygan, WI: Chicago Bruins 28, Sheboygan Red Skins 31
- February 5, 1941 @ Chicago, IL: Akron Goodyear Wingfoots 41, Chicago Bruins 42
- February 8, 1941 @ Oshkosh, WI: Chicago Bruins 31, Oshkosh All-Stars 45
- February 12, 1941 @ Chicago, IL: Akron Firestone Non-Skids 46, Chicago Bruins 37
- February 15, 1941 @ Chicago, IL: Sheboygan Red Skins 41, Chicago Bruins 38
- February 17, 1941 @ Detroit, MI: Chicago Bruins 46, Detroit Eagles 52
- February 19, 1941 @ Chicago, IL: Detroit Eagles 28, Chicago Bruins 55
- February 24, 1941 @ Chicago, IL: Oshkosh All-Stars 33, Chicago Bruins 49
- February 26, 1941 @ Chicago, IL: Hammond Ciesar All-Americans 18, Chicago Bruins 27
- February 28, 1941 @ Akron, OH: Chicago Bruins 27, Akron Firestone Non-Skids 46

== Awards and honors ==
- Bill Hapac – All-NBL Second Team
- Wibs Kautz – All-NBL Second Team
- Ralph Vaughn – All-NBL Second Team
- Mike Novak – NBL All-Time Team

== World Professional Basketball Tournament ==
After previously being close to winning the 1940 World Professional Basketball Tournament against the world famous Harlem Globetrotters, the Chicago Bruins would once again participate in the now-annual World Professional Basketball Tournament, with the 1941 event taking place in Chicago once again on March 15–19 that year and having 14 teams taking part that mostly involved independently ran teams (including the Indianapolis Kautskys, who left the NBL the previous year before returning to the NBL the following year, as well as future NBL teams in the Fort Wayne Zollner Pistons and Rochester Seagrams (later Royals) to become the future NBA teams known as the Detroit Pistons and Sacramento Kings) alongside four of the NBL's teams (including the new NBL champion Oshkosh All-Stars (who were considered the favorites of the tournament), the Sheboygan Red Skins, and the Detroit Eagles) and the Bruins' former league they played in, the rivaling American Basketball League, having their own championship representation in play with the Philadelphia Sphas. In the first round of the event, the Bruins went up against the Davenport Central Turner Rockets to open up this WPBT on March 15, with the Davenport team being led by a future American Football League and Super Bowl V referee (back judge) named Sonny Gamber. During that game, Chicago would brutally beat down Davenport early on, leading 25–4 over them at halftime before the Bruins substituted their players freely in the second half (though still beating up the Davenport roster) to eventually win with a 53–17 beatdown favoring Chicago over the inexperienced Davenport roster. Both Stan Szukala and George Hogan would end up with 10 points each for the Bruins as they entered the quarterfinal round of the event.

During the quarterfinal round, Chicago would see their home team in the Bruins go up against the Toledo White Huts, an integrated team of mixed races (the only team to be that way in the WPBT this year) that were sponsored by a hamburger chain called White Hut who also had to borrow team shorts from the Rochester Seagrams alongside buying University of Toledo jerseys, were led by former NBL player Chuck Chuckovits during the event, and were later considered to be the NBL's Toledo Jim White Chevrolets and then potentially the Toledo Jeeps. After Toledo previously beat the Sheboygan Red Skins in the first round, the White Huts would go and defeat the Bruins in the quarterfinal round as another upset on their ends with a 43–33 victory in Toledo's favor. While Chuck Chuckovits would continue his high-scoring efforts with a game-high 23 points scored for the White Huts' favor, Chicago would only get to see Mike Novak get 12 points scored as the team's scoring leader while both Bill Hapac and Stan Szukala scored 7 each for the Bruins. Toledo would later get eliminated in the semifinal round by the Oshkosh All-Stars in the semifinal round, with Toledo losing their third place consolation prize match to the all-black New York Renaissance and Oshkosh losing their championship round match to the Detroit Eagles, while Chicago would not get anyone to be named a part of the All-Tournament Team this time around.

=== Scores ===
- Won first round (53–17) over Davenport Central Turner Rockets
- Lost quarterfinal round (33–43) to the Toledo White Huts
