= 1939–40 Chicago Bruins season =

NBL professional basketball team season

- Head coach: Sam Lifschultz
- Owner(s): George Halas; Charles Bidwill
- Arena: 132nd Regiment Armory

Results
- Record: 14–14 (.500)
- Place: Division: 3rd (Western)
- Playoff finish: Did not qualify Lost WPBT Championship match 31–29 to the Harlem Globetrotters

The 1939–40 Chicago Bruins season was the Bruins' first season of existence when playing professionally for the National Basketball League (though not their first professional basketball season as a whole), which officially was the third season the NBL existed as a professional basketball league after previously existing as a semi-pro or amateur basketball league called the Midwest Basketball Conference in its first two seasons back in 1935. The reason why this is not the first professional basketball season the Bruins ever had as a franchise throughout their history was because they had originally existed as a professional basketball team in the original rendition of the American Basketball League that had existed from 1925 to 1931 before the Great Depression caused a hiatus on the ABL in order for it to return a couple of years later on a smaller basis (and minus the Bruins) in 1933, years before the NBL or even its predecessor in the Midwest Basketball Conference were even created. As such, if we include their original six ABL years alongside the potential independent seasons of play (including the season where they played as the Chicago Harmons in the inaugural World Professional Basketball Tournament), this would, at the very least, be their eighth (or more (potentially going up to what would be their seventeenth)) season of play. Despite the Bruins being the only new NBL team to join their league this season (with the briefly existing Cleveland White Horses moving upward to Detroit, Michigan to become the Detroit Eagles as the only other team movement from within the NBL this season), the new Chicago team would still be one of eight NBL teams to participate in this season following the Pittsburgh Pirates NBL team's exit out of the league (albeit on a longer, yet temporary basis), with four teams competing in the Eastern Division and four teams competing in the Western Division (which would be Chicago's division in the only season where they had divisional play at hand there).

Originally, the Bruins would enter the season with a promising start due to them leading the Western Division with a 3–0 start to the season. However, once 1939 turned into 1940, Chicago would have a harder time maintaining their division lead the further the season went on, as they continued being threatened throughout the season by the two Wisconsin-based teams in the Oshkosh All-Stars and the Sheboygan Red Skins at various intervals throughout the season. While the Bruins tried to maintain their strong composure early on throughout the season (to the point of having a 10–7 record near the start of February 1940), Chicago ultimately could not make it to the NBL Playoffs in their inaugural season of the NBL, as they finished their season with an average 14–14 record. While the record was good enough for a third-place finish, they still finished a game behind both the Oshkosh All-Stars and Sheboygan Red Skins by one game for both teams (with Oshkosh being considered the official Western Division champions this season), meaning they could not qualify for a playoff spot with the eight-team formatting the NBL had this season. Despite the brutal downfall they had this season, the Bruins would still see Wibs Kautz make it to the All-NBL First Team due to his performances for the Bruins throughout the entire season.

In addition to the NBL, the Chicago Bruins also participated in the 1940 World Professional Basketball Tournament, which was the second version of the World Professional Basketball Tournament that began the previous year in Chicago where the WPBT would determine the team that would be considered the professional basketball champions in the U.S.A. throughout this early period of time. The Bruins would compete alongside their Western Division rivals from Wisconsin in the Oshkosh All-Stars and the Sheboygan Red Skins as the only NBL teams participating in that tournament, which mostly featured independently ran teams alongside the Washington Heurich Brewers from the rivaling American Basketball League. Despite the Bruins being the only non-playoff team to participate in the WPBT this year, they would go surprisingly far in the tournament, thanks in part to them being the local home team for the fans to cheer for throughout the event. After defeating the Fort Wayne Harvesters in the first round, they would upset the Oshkosh All-Stars with a 40–38 overtime victory in the quarterfinal round and then defeat the ABL's Washington Heurich Brewers in the semifinal round with a solid chance to win the second tournament's ever championship. Unfortunately for them, they would find themselves going up against the world famous (all-black) Harlem Globetrotters, whose combination of performative skills and comedic antics (alongside an untimely injury to Vince McGowan from the Hammond Ciesar All-Americans, who would join the Bruins for the WPBT that year) would prove to be too much for the Bruins to overcome as the Harlem Globetrotters would win the second WPBT in a surprisingly close 31–29 defeat for Chicago's NBL franchise.

== Roster ==
Please note that due to the way records for professional basketball leagues like the NBL and the ABL were recorded at the time, some information on both teams and players may be harder to list out than usual here.

Player	Position
Tony Carp	F-C
Marv Colen	G
Harold Dembo	G-F
Ray Hayes	G-F
George Hogan	G-F
Elmer Johnson	F-C
Wibs Kautz	G-F
Frank Linskey	G-F
Bob MacLeod	G-F
Mike Novak	C
Eddie Oram	G-F
Willie Phillips	G-F
George Wilson	G-F
Stan Zadel	F-C

In addition to them, there was also another individual with the last name of Riskind (supposedly having his first name start with the letter G) who played only one game as a guard for the Bruins this season that would not have proper credit for his sole appearance on the team there otherwise.

== Regular season ==
=== Season standings ===
Pos.	Western Division	Wins	Losses	Win %
T–1	Oshkosh All-Stars	15	13	.536
T–1	Sheboygan Red Skins	15	13	.536
3	Chicago Bruins	14	14	.500
4	Hammond Ciesar All-Americans	9	19	.321

=== NBL Schedule ===
Not to be confused with exhibition or other non-NBL scheduled games that did not count towards Chicago's official NBL record for this season. An official database created by John Grasso detailing every NBL match possible (outside of two matches that the Kankakee Gallagher Trojans won over the Dayton Metropolitans in 1938) would be released in 2026 showcasing every team's official schedules throughout their time spent in the NBL. As such, these are the official results recorded for the Chicago Bruins during their first season out in the NBL.

- December 6, 1939 @ Chicago, IL: Oshkosh All-Stars 19, Chicago Bruins 28
- December 13, 1939 @ Chicago, IL: Detroit Eagles 24, Chicago Bruins 34
- December 20, 1939 @ Chicago, IL: Akron Firestone Non-Skids 29, Chicago Bruins 31
- December 26, 1939 @ Detroit, MI: Chicago Bruins 31, Detroit Eagles 37
- December 27, 1939 @ Indianapolis, IN: Chicago Bruins 41, Indianapolis Kautskys 33
- December 28, 1939 @ Akron, OH: Chicago Bruins 38, Akron Firestone Non-Skids 48
- December 30, 1939 @ Akron, OH: Chicago Bruins 23, Akron Goodyear Wingfoots 32
- January 3, 1940 @ Chicago, IL: Akron Goodyear Wingfoots 30, Chicago Bruins 37
- January 7, 1940 @ Chicago, IL: Sheboygan Red Skins 20, Chicago Bruins 19
- January 10, 1940 @ Chicago, IL: Indianapolis Kautskys 47, Chicago Bruins 45
- January 14, 1940 @ Hammond, IN: Chicago Bruins 33, Hammond Ciesar All-Americans 34
- January 17, 1940 @ Chicago, IL: Detroit Eagles 28, Chicago Bruins 36
- January 18, 1940 @ Sheboygan, WI: Chicago Bruins 45, Sheboygan Red Skins 37
- January 20, 1940 @ Oshkosh, WI: Chicago Bruins 43, Oshkosh All-Stars 53
- January 24, 1940 @ Chicago, IL: Hammond Ciesar All-Americans 31, Chicago Bruins 33
- January 31, 1940 @ Chicago, IL: Oshkosh All-Stars 33, Chicago Bruins 38
- February 3, 1940 @ Akron, OH: Chicago Bruins 40, Akron Firestone Non-Skids 34
- February 5, 1940 @ Akron, OH: Chicago Bruins 25, Akron Goodyear Wingfoots 39
- February 7, 1940 @ Chicago, IL: Akron Firestone Non-Skids 39, Chicago Bruins 33
- February 8, 1940 @ Sheboygan, WI: Chicago Bruins 35, Sheboygan Red Skins 38
- February 11, 1940 @ Akron, OH: Chicago Bruins 35, Hammond Ciesar All-Americans 31
- February 14, 1940 @ Chicago, IL: Akron Goodyear Wingfoots 37, Chicago Bruins 34
- February 21, 1940 @ Chicago, IL: Sheboygan Red Skins 34, Chicago Bruins 41
- February 22, 1940 @ Terre Haute, IN: Chicago Bruins 57, Indianapolis Kautskys 58
- February 24, 1940 @ Oshkosh, WI: Chicago Bruins 41, Oshkosh All-Stars 57
- February 28, 1940 @ Chicago, IL: Hammond Ciesar All-Americans 27, Chicago Bruins 31
- March 2, 1940 @ Chicago, IL: Indianapolis Kautskys 34, Chicago Bruins 50
- March 5, 1940 @ Detroit, MI: Chicago Bruins 53, Detroit Eagles 56

== Awards and honors ==
- All-NBL First Team – Wibs Kautz
- NBL All-Time Team – Mike Novak

== World Professional Basketball Tournament ==
After previously (presumably) competing in the inaugural 1939 World Professional Basketball Tournament as the Chicago Harmons, the Chicago Bruins would (presumably) return to the second World Professional Basketball Tournament ever held with the 1940 event holding the tournament in their home city of Chicago once again, this time on March 18–22 of that year, with the Bruins joining the Oshkosh All-Stars and Sheboygan Red Skins as the three NBL teams competing in a 14-team tournament where they went up against mostly other independently ran squads and the Washington Heurich Brewers from the Bruins' old league that they used to play in, the rivaling American Basketball League. In the first round of the second ever WPBT event held, the local Bruins would go up against the Fort Wayne Harvesters as the Fort Wayne, Indiana representative of the tournament for what would end up becoming their second and final ever WPBT appearance in the event's history. With the addition of Vince McGowan from the Hammond Ciesar All-Americans earlier in the season, the Bruins would open the 1940 WPBT with a 45–27 beatdown upon the Harvesters, with Wibs Kautz and rookie center Mike Novak leading the way for the team in points scored that night with 12 and 11 points respectively alongside the 6 points scored by McGowan.

For the quarterfinal round, Chicago would go up against one of the two competing NBL teams that were joining the Bruins in the WPBT this year, the Oshkosh All-Stars. This match would be one of the very few WPBT matches that would ever go into overtime throughout the entire tournament's history. However, by the end of the quarterfinal round match between these two teams, the Bruins would end up overcoming the strength of the All-Stars as Chicago beat Oshkosh with a 40–38 final score in the overtime period, with the Bruins' Wibs Kautz scoring a game-high 24 points that night. With the Oshkosh All-Stars joining the Sheboygan Red Skins as the two defeated NBL teams in the event, Chicago would be the only remaining NBL team competing throughout the rest of the event in question.

In the semifinal round, the Bruins would go up against one of the two teams that got a bye in the first round of this year's event, the Washington Heurich Brewers of the rivaling American Basketball League that this same Chicago team used to be a part of during the first iteration of that league's existence. Despite the Heurich Brewers looking to have an easier time with more rest on their ends after having a first round bye (alongside the Syracuse Reds) and then beating the Waterloo Wonders in the quarterfinal round, the Bruins would end up winning their semifinal round match with a 46–38 victory over the ABL franchise in Washington due to Wibs Kautz scoring 24 points in that match also. With the Washington Heurich Brewers going to the third place consolation prize round (later winning against the other team that had a first round bye this year, the Syracuse Reds), Chicago would look to enter the championship round with a unique home court advantage in mind against the last remaining competitor at hand.

For the championship match, however, the Bruins would see themselves go up against the world famous Harlem Globetrotters, an all-black team that first began their existence as the Chicago Globetrotters, which would effectively make this year's championship event become a battle of the Chicago-born franchises. The Globetrotters would end up making it to the championship round due to a blowout win over the Kenosha Royals in the first round, a close quarterfinals victory over the all-black defending WPBT champions in the New York Renaissance (who could be considered more like a 100% serious version of the Harlem Globetrotters), and a semifinal win over the only other team that had a first round bye this year in the Syracuse Reds (who had previously beaten the Sheboygan Red Skins in the quarterfinal round themselves). During the championship match, both the hometown NBL team in the Bruins and the Harlem Globetrotters would keep things close with each other throughout the entire match, but the event would ultimately end with the Globetrotters becoming the new WPBT champions through a 31–29 defeat by the Chicago Bruins. In that championship match, the team's leading player in Wibs Kautz (who would later be named a member of the All-Tournament Team) would be left in an extremely limited position throughout the entire match, leading to rookie center Mike Novak leading the team in scoring this time with only 7 total points scored, while the Harlem Globetrotters had Sonny Boswell leading the team with 12 points scored, resulting in Sonny Boswell later being named the WPBT MVP this year.

=== Scores ===
- Won first round (45–27) over the Fort Wayne Harvesters.
- Won quarterfinal round (40–38) over the Oshkosh All-Stars in overtime.
- Won semifinal round (46–38) over the Washington Heurich Brewers.
- Lost championship round (29–31) to the Harlem Globetrotters.

=== Awards and honors ===
- Wibs Kautz, All-Tournament Team, WPBT leading scorer (57 points scored in four games)
