= 1939–40 Hammond Ciesar All-Americans season =

NBL professional basketball team season

- Head coach: Lou Boudreau (1–4); Edward "Eddie" Ciesar (interim; 0–2); Leo Bereolos (8–13)
- General manager: Edward "Eddie" Ciesar
- Owner: Edward "Eddie" Ciesar
- Arena: Hammond Civic Center

Results
- Record: 9–19 (.321)
- Place: Division: 4th (Western)
- Playoff finish: Did not qualify

The 1939–40 Hammond Ciesar All-Americans season was the third professional basketball season of play for the franchise and second official season for the Hammond Ciesar All-Americans under that name following their move from Whiting to Hammond, Indiana under the National Basketball League, which was also in its second season that it existed as a professional basketball league after previously existing as a semi-pro or amateur basketball league called the Midwest Basketball Conference in its first two seasons back in 1935. However, if you include their brief time as an independent team before later joining the Midwest Basketball Conference in its second and final season of existence when they first started out as the Whiting Ciesar All-Americans, this would officially be considered at least their fifth season of existence as a team. Once again, the Hammond Ciesar All-Americans entered the season as one of eight teams to represent the NBL, which was composed of four teams in the Eastern Division and four teams in the Western Division (Hammond's division), with the only differences this season involving the addition of the former American Basketball League (rivaling) team in the Chicago Bruins joining the NBL in order to replace the Pittsburgh Pirates NBL team and the Cleveland White Horses moving to Detroit to become the Detroit Eagles (which led to the Indianapolis Kautskys moving to the Eastern Division this season).

Early on in the season, future Baseball Hall of Fame member and Cleveland Indians turned Hammond Ciesar All-Americans head coach Lou Boudreau would start the season out with a 1–4 record before being let go from his coaching position by team owner Edward "Eddie" Ciesar (with him taking over as interim head coach for two games) before being replaced by Leo Bereolos for the rest of the season. Despite that coaching replacement and not having Naismith Basketball Hall of Fame guard John Wooden at all throughout this season, the Hammond Ciesar All-Americans would end up having a better record this season than the previous season due to the coaching that Leo Bereolos had done for Hammond, with his coaching record being 8–13 to start out the season. This led to the Ciesar All-Americans having a 9–19 record for the season; while this still led to them having a last place finish in the NBL's Western Division (as well as being tied for the worst record in the league with the Indianapolis Kautskys of the Eastern Division) to fail to reach the NBL Playoffs once again, this would still end up causing the Ciesar All-Americans to have one more season of play in the NBL since they felt the team's improvement for this season would cause themselves to have one last chance to play in the NBL for the following season to come.

== Roster ==
Please note that due to the way records for professional basketball leagues like the NBL and the ABL were recorded at the time, some information on both teams and players may be harder to list out than usual here.

Player	Position
Chuck Chuckovits	G-F
Jim Currie	G-F
Glynn Downey	G
James Goff	F-C
Dale Hamilton	G-F
Al Hanisko	G(?)
George Hogan	G-F
Dar Hutchins	F-C
Gordon McComb	G
Vince McGowan	F-C
Bobby Neu	G-F
Tommy Nisbet	G
Joe Sotak	F-C
Joe Spudic	F
Hale Swanson	G-F
Nick Yost	F-C

== Regular season ==
=== NBL Schedule ===
Not to be confused with exhibition or other non-NBL scheduled games that did not count towards Hammond's official NBL record for this season. An official database created by John Grasso detailing every NBL match possible (outside of two matches that the Kankakee Gallagher Trojans won over the Dayton Metropolitans in 1938) would be released in 2026 showcasing every team's official schedules throughout their time spent in the NBL. As such, these are the official results recorded for the Hammond Ciesar All-Americans during their third season (second season under the Hammond Ciesar All-Americans name) in the NBL.

- November 29, 1939 @ Sheboygan, WI: Hammond Ciesar All-Americans 32, Sheboygan Red Skins 35
- December 3, 1939 @ Hammond, IN: Sheboygan Red Skins 41, Hammond Ciesar All-Americans 28
- December 10, 1939 @ Hammond, IN: Akron Firestone Non-Skids 47, Hammond Ciesar All-Americans 52
- December 17, 1939 @ Hammond, IN: Detroit Eagles 53, Hammond Ciesar All-Americans 38
- December 24, 1939 @ Hammond, IN: Oshkosh All-Stars 47, Hammond Ciesar All-Americans 42
- December 31, 1939 @ Hammond, IN: Indianapolis Kautskys 32, Hammond Ciesar All-Americans 30
- January 3, 1940 @ Lebanon, IN: Hammond Ciesar All-Americans 28, Indianapolis Kautskys 58
- January 7, 1940 @ Hammond, IN: Akron Goodyear Wingfoots 33, Hammond Ciesar All-Americans 31
- January 14, 1940 @ Hammond, IN: Chicago Bruins 33, Hammond Ciesar All-Americans 34
- January 16, 1940 @ Detroit, MI: Hammond Ciesar All-Americans 32, Detroit Eagles 45
- January 17, 1940 @ Akron, OH: Hammond Ciesar All-Americans 46, Akron Firestone Non-Skids 62
- January 18, 1940 @ Akron, OH: Hammond Ciesar All-Americans 31, Akron Goodyear Wingfoots 47
- January 21, 1940 @ Hammond, IN: Sheboygan Red Skins 31, Hammond Ciesar All-Americans 32
- January 24, 1940 @ Chicago, IL: Hammond Ciesar All-Americans 31, Chicago Bruins 33
- January 27, 1940 @ Oshkosh, WI: Hammond Ciesar All-Americans 43, Oshkosh All-Stars 56
- January 28, 1940 @ Hammond, IN: Indianapolis Kautskys 33, Hammond Ciesar All-Americans 48
- February 1, 1940 @ Sheboygan, WI: Hammond Ciesar All-Americans 36, Sheboygan Red Skins 43
- February 4, 1940 @ Hammond, IN: Oshkosh All-Stars 36, Hammond Ciesar All-Americans 37
- February 10, 1940 @ Oshkosh, WI: Hammond Ciesar All-Americans 32, Oshkosh All-Stars 38
- February 11, 1940 @ Akron, OH: Chicago Bruins 35, Hammond Ciesar All-Americans 31
- February 14, 1940 @ Indianapolis, IN: Hammond Ciesar All-Americans 48, Indianapolis Kautskys 41
- February 18, 1940 @ Hammond, IN: Akron Goodyear Wingfoots 35, Hammond Ciesar All-Americans 48
- February 20, 1940 @ Detroit, MI: Hammond Ciesar All-Americans 43, Detroit Eagles 39
- February 21, 1940 @ Hammond, IN: Akron Goodyear Wingfoots 37, Hammond Ciesar All-Americans 36
- February 22, 1940 @ Akron, OH: Hammond Ciesar All-Americans 46, Akron Firestone Non-Skids 50
- February 25, 1940 @ Hammond, IN: Detroit Eagles 25, Hammond Ciesar All-Americans 31
- February 28, 1940 @ Chicago, IL: Hammond Ciesar All-Americans 27, Chicago Bruins 31
- March 3, 1940 @ Hammond, IN: Akron Firestone Non-Skids 45, Hammond Ciesar All-Americans 39

=== Season standings ===
Pos.	Western Division	Wins	Losses	Win %
T–1	Oshkosh All-Stars	15	13	.536
T–1	Sheboygan Red Skins	15	13	.536
3	Chicago Bruins	14	14	.500
4	Hammond Ciesar All-Americans	9	19	.321

=== Awards and honors ===
- NBL All-Time Team – Chuck Chuckovits
