= 1940–41 Oshkosh All-Stars season =

NBL professional basketball team season

- NBL champions
- Division champions
- Head coach: George Hotchkiss
- Arena: South Park School Gymnasium

Results
- Record: 18–6 (.750)
- Place: Division: 1st
- Playoff finish: NBL champions (Won 3–0 over Sheboygan Red Skins)

The 1940–41 Oshkosh All-Stars season was the All-Stars' fourth year in the United States' National Basketball League (NBL), which was also the fourth year the league existed. However, if one were to include the independent seasons they played starting all the way back in 1929 before beginning their NBL tenure in 1937, this would officially be their eleventh season of play. Seven teams competed in the NBL in 1940–41, and for the first time, the league did not use divisions.

The All-Stars played their home games at South Park School Gymnasium. For the fourth consecutive season, the All-Stars finished the season with either a division or league-best record (18–6). They then went on to win their first NBL championship after having lost in the finals the previous three seasons.

Head coach George Hotchkiss won the league's Coach of the Year Award. Players Leroy Edwards and Charley Shipp earned First Team All-NBL honors.

== Roster ==
1940–41 Oshkosh All-Stars roster
Players

Pos.	No.	Player	Height	Weight	DOB	From
F	26	Lou Barle	6 ft 1 in (1.85 m)	200 lb (91 kg)	1916–06–23	Minnesota Duluth
F/C	30	Connie Mack Berry	6 ft 3 in (1.91 m)	215 lb (98 kg)	1915–04–19	NC State
F/C	24	Bob Carpenter	6 ft 5 in (1.96 m)	200 lb (91 kg)	1917–11–06	East Texas A&M
C	29	Leroy Edwards	6 ft 5 in (1.96 m)	210 lb (95 kg)	1914–04–11	Kentucky
G		Pete Hecomovich	6 ft 4 in (1.93 m)	205 lb (93 kg)	1918–06–13	Idaho
G	25	Tex Mueller	6 ft 1 in (1.85 m)	175 lb (79 kg)	1916–07–29	Western Colorado
G	23	Tommy Nisbet	5 ft 10 in (1.78 m)	165 lb (75 kg)	1916–03–31	Illinois
G/F	28	Erv Prasse	6 ft 2 in (1.88 m)	190 lb (86 kg)	1917–12–01	Iowa
G/F	20	Scoop Putnam	6 ft 0 in (1.83 m)	175 lb (79 kg)	1912–09–08	Tennessee
G/F	27	Charley Shipp	6 ft 1 in (1.85 m)	200 lb (91 kg)	1913–12–03	Catholic
G/F	31	Herm Witasek	6 ft 2 in (1.88 m)	210 lb (95 kg)	1913–10–16	North Dakota

Coaches
Head coach
- George Hotchkiss

Legend
- (DP) Unsigned draft pick
- (FA) Free agent
- (S) Suspended
- Injured

Roster

Note: Pete Hecomovich was not on the playoffs roster

== Regular season ==
=== Season standings ===
Pos.	League Standings	Wins	Losses	Win %
1	Oshkosh All-Stars	18	6	.750
T–2	Sheboygan Red Skins	13	11	.542
T–2	Akron Firestone Non-Skids	13	11	.542
4	Detroit Eagles	12	12	.500
T–5	Chicago Bruins	11	13	.458
T–5	Akron Goodyear Wingfoots	11	13	.458
7	Hammond Ciesar All-Americans	6	18	.250

=== NBL Schedule ===
Not to be confused with exhibition or other non-NBL scheduled games that did not count towards Oshkosh's official NBL record for this season. An official database created by John Grasso detailing every NBL match possible (outside of two matches that the Kankakee Gallagher Trojans won over the Dayton Metropolitans in 1938) would be released in 2026 showcasing every team's official schedules throughout their time spent in the NBL. As such, these are the official results recorded for the Oshkosh All-Stars during their fourth season in the NBL under that name for the league.

- November 27, 1940 @ Oshkosh, WI: Akron Goodyear Wingfoots 27, Oshkosh All-Stars 44
- December 7, 1940 @ Oshkosh, WI: Hammond Ciesar All-Americans 27, Oshkosh All-Stars 44
- December 13, 1940 @ Akron, OH: Oshkosh All-Stars 43, Akron Goodyear Wingfoots 30
- December 16, 1940 @ Akron, OH: Oshkosh All-Stars 37, Akron Firestone Non-Skids 32
- December 21, 1940 @ Oshkosh, WI: Sheboygan Red Skins 23, Oshkosh All-Stars 27
- December 28, 1940 @ Oshkosh, WI: Detroit Eagles 37, Oshkosh All-Stars 52
- January 4, 1941 @ Oshkosh, WI: Akron Goodyear Wingfoots 33, Oshkosh All-Stars 35
- January 11, 1941 @ Oshkosh, WI: Chicago Bruins 36, Oshkosh All-Stars 43
- January 12, 1941 @ Hammond, IN: Oshkosh All-Stars 32, Hammond Ciesar All-Americans 43
- January 18, 1941 @ Oshkosh, WI: Akron Firestone Non-Skids 43, Oshkosh All-Stars 45
- January 19, 1941 @ Sheboygan, WI: Oshkosh All-Stars 34, Sheboygan Red Skins 29
- January 22, 1941 @ Chicago, IL: Oshkosh All-Stars 32, Chicago Bruins 34
- January 25, 1941: Sheboygan Red Skins 40, Oshkosh All-Stars 45 (OT @ Oshkosh, WI)
- January 28, 1941 @ Akron, OH: Oshkosh All-Stars 48, Akron Firestone Non-Skids 58
- January 29, 1941 @ Detroit, MI: Oshkosh All-Stars 34, Detroit Eagles 36
- February 1, 1941 @ Oshkosh, WI: Hammond Ciesar All-Americans 38, Oshkosh All-Stars 60
- February 8, 1941 @ Oshkosh, WI: Chicago Bruins 31, Oshkosh All-Stars 45
- February 11, 1941 @ Akron, OH: Oshkosh All-Stars 40, Akron Goodyear Wingfoots 36
- February 13, 1941 @ Detroit, MI: Oshkosh All-Stars 41, Detroit Eagles 30
- February 15, 1941 @ Oshkosh, WI: Akron Firestone Non-Skids 49, Oshkosh All-Stars 43
- February 16, 1941 @ Hammond, IN: Oshkosh All-Stars 64, Hammond Ciesar All-Americans 45
- February 22, 1941 @ Oshkosh, WI: Detroit Eagles 57, Oshkosh All-Stars 59
- February 24, 1941 @ Chicago, IL: Oshkosh All-Stars 33, Chicago Bruins 49
- February 27, 1941 @ Sheboygan, WI: Oshkosh All-Stars 32, Sheboygan Red Skins 27

== NBL Playoffs ==
=== NBL Semifinals ===
(1) Oshkosh All-Stars vs. (3) Akron Firestone Non-Skids: Oshkosh wins series 2–0

- Game 1: March 4, 1941 @ Akron: Oshkosh 30, Akron 28
- Game 2: March 6, 1941 @ Oshkosh: Oshkosh 47, Akron 41^{(OT)}

=== NBL Championship ===
(1) Oshkosh All-Stars vs. (2) Sheboygan Red Skins: Oshkosh wins series 3–0

- Game 1: March 10, 1941 @ Sheboygan: Oshkosh 53, Sheboygan 38
- Game 2: March 11, 1941 @ Oshkosh: Oshkosh 44, Sheboygan 38
- Game 3: March 12, 1941 @ Oshkosh: Oshkosh 54, Sheboygan 36

=== Awards and honors ===
- NBL Coach of the Year – George Hotchkiss
- First Team All-NBL – Leroy Edwards and Charley Shipp
- All-Time NBL Team – Bob Carpenter, Leroy Edwards, and Charley Shipp

== World Professional Basketball Tournament ==
For the third straight year in a row, the Oshkosh All-Stars would participate in the annual World Professional Basketball Tournament in Chicago, which the 1941 event was held on March 15–19, 1941 (with the tournament beginning three days after Oshkosh swept Sheboygan for the NBL Championship) and was mostly held by independently ran teams (including the Indianapolis Kautskys, who left the NBL the previous year before returning to the NBL the following year, as well as future NBL teams in the Fort Wayne Zollner Pistons and Rochester Seagrams (later Royals) to become the future NBA teams known as the Detroit Pistons and Sacramento Kings) alongside four of the NBL's teams (including the champion Oshkosh All-Stars, who were considered the favorites of the tournament) and the rivaling American Basketball League's own champions, the Philadelphia Sphas. In the first round on March 16, Oshkosh defeated the works team turned future NBL/BAA/NBA team known as the Fort Wayne Zollner Pistons (who had defeated the independently ran Fort Wayne Harvesters team from previous tournaments to earn the open Fort Wayne, Indiana spot at hand there) 47–41. In the quarterfinal round (which was dubbed at the time as "the 'little' world series between the National League and American League" due to both league champions competing against each other early on in the tournament), the NBL champion All-Stars managed to defeat the ABL champion Philadelphia Sphas 38–31. By the semifinal round, Oshkosh would keep things close with the independently ran Toledo White Huts (who were the only integrated team of the WPBT who was sponsored by a hamburger chain called White Hut who also had to borrow team shorts from the Rochester Seagrams alongside buying University of Toledo jerseys, were led by former NBL player Chuck Chuckovits, and were later considered to be the NBL's Toledo Jim White Chevrolets and then potentially the Toledo Jeeps), but they would ultimately win 40–37 to enter the championship round; with the NBL's Detroit Eagles defeating the also independently ran New York Renaissance in the semifinal round, the 1941 tournament marked the first time in WPBT history that the championship match would have a professional NBL team winning the tournament. In the final match, Oshkosh had fallen behind Detroit 35–23 entering the fourth quarter; the All-Stars tried to fight hard all throughout the fourth quarter to catch up and upset the Eagles, to the point of holding them to only four total points scored that quarter, but Detroit managed to hold onto their lead just long enough to win 39–37 (leading to Buddy Jeannette of the Eagles being named the MVP of the tournament) to not just upset the NBL champions in the WPBT, but also be the first NBL team to win that tournament's championship in the process. Despite being upset in the championship round (which occurred with Oshkosh shooting at a lowly 13/78 from the field that night, including star player Leroy Edwards making only one shot out of 15 total attempts), Bob Carpenter of the All-Stars would be named a member of the All-Tournament Team that year.

=== Games ===
- Won first round (47–41) over the Fort Wayne Zollner Pistons
- Won quarterfinal round (38–31) over the Philadelphia Sphas
- Won semifinal round (40–37) over the Toledo White Huts
- Lost championship round (37–39) to the Detroit Eagles

=== Awards and Records ===
- Bob Carpenter, All-Tournament Team
