= 1940–41 National Basketball League (United States) season =

1940–41 NBL season
- League: National Basketball League
- Sport: Basketball
- Duration: November 27, 1940 – February 28, 1941; March 4–8, 1941 (Playoffs); March 10–12, 1941 (Finals)
- Games: 24
- Teams: 7

Regular season
- Season champions: Oshkosh All-Stars
- Top seed: Oshkosh All-Stars
- Season MVP: Ben Stephens (Akron Goodyear Wingfoots)
- Top scorer: Ben Stephens (Akron Goodyear Wingfoots)

Playoffs
- champions: Oshkosh All-Stars
- runners-up: Akron Firestone Non-Skids
- champions: Sheboygan Red Skins
- runners-up: Detroit Eagles

Finals
- Venue: South Park School Gymnasium, Oshkosh, Wisconsin; Eagles Auditorium, Sheboygan, Wisconsin
- Champions: Oshkosh All-Stars
- Runners-up: Sheboygan Red Skins

NBL seasons
- ← 1939–40 1941–42 →

The 1940–41 NBL season was the sixth National Basketball League (NBL) season. The regular season began on November 27, 1940, and ran until February 28, 1941. It was the first NBL regular season to be played without divisions due to the NBL thinking they would be without two of their teams to start the season at the time. The playoffs began on March 4, 1941, and ran until March 12, 1941, with the Oshkosh All-Stars defeating the Sheboygan Red Skins by three games to none to claim their first NBL title.

== Teams ==
The Indianapolis Katuskys did not compete in the NBL this season, instead playing as a barnstorming team. With a total of seven teams, the NBL did not use Eastern and Western divisions this season. The Detroit Eagles had also originally intended to not play through this season in the NBL due to team owner and head coach Gerry Archibald having trouble securing a home venue for his team this season (which helped influence the NBL's decision to remove divisions from this season entirely), but new ownership taking over the team for him would help solve those problems in time for them to re-enter this season without much issue on the NBL's end.

National Basketball League
Akron Firestone Non-Skids

Akron, Ohio

Akron Goodyear Wingfoots

Akron, Ohio

Chicago Bruins

Chicago, Illinois

Detroit Eagles

Detroit, Michigan

Hammond Ciesar All-Americans

Hammond, Indiana

Oshkosh All-Stars

Oshkosh, Wisconsin

Sheboygan Red Skins

Sheboygan, Wisconsin

Coaching changes
Offseason
Team	1939–40 coach	1940–41 coach
Chicago Bruins	Sam Lifschultz	Frank Linksey (player-coach)
Detroit Eagles	Gerry Archibald	Dutch Dehnert
Hammond Ciesar All-Americans	Leo Bereolos	Carl Anderson (player-coach)
Oshkosh All-Stars	Lon Darling	George Hotchkiss

== Preseason ==
The Detroit Eagles struggled to secure a home venue, which almost resulted in them being unable to play the season. The NBL planned for a six-team schedule prior to the Eagles securing a last-minute deal to play at the Detroit Naval Armory, before re-adjusting the schedule to accommodate the Eagles. Part of their success by the start of the regular season was due to the Eagles going through a change in ownership, with owner, head coach, and general manager Gerry Archibald selling the team to a Detroit-based ownership group including a Chrysler Motors executive. Archibald also stepped down as coach, being replaced by Dutch Dehnert.

== Regular season ==
The regular season used a 24-game schedule, where each team played every other team four times (twice at home, twice away).

Pos.	League Standings	Wins	Losses	Win %
1	Oshkosh All-Stars	18	6	.750
T–2	Sheboygan Red Skins	13	11	.542
T–2	Akron Firestone Non-Skids	13	11	.542
4	Detroit Eagles	12	12	.500
T–5	Chicago Bruins	11	13	.458
T–5	Akron Goodyear Wingfoots	11	13	.458
7	Hammond Ciesar All-Americans	6	18	.250

== Postseason ==
=== Playoffs ===
The top four teams qualified for the playoffs, with the semifinals pitting the 1-seed against the 3-seed, and the 2-seed against the 4-seed in best-of-three series. The winners of the semifinal matchups would play each other for the NBL Championship in a best-of-five series.

The Oshkosh All-Stars, Sheboygan Red Skins, Akron Firestone Non-Skids, and Detroit Eagles had the best four records during the regular season. Sheboygan and Akron, having finished tied for second place at 13 wins and 11 losses each, had their seed determined by coin toss. Sheboygan drew the 2-seed and was matched up with Detroit, while Akron drew the 3-seed and was matched up with Oshkosh.

The All-Stars and Red Skins advanced to the NBL Championship, after the All-Stars swept the Non-Skids 2–0 and the Red Skins defeated the Eagles 2–1. In the championship series, Oshkosh swept Sheboygan 3–0 to claim its first title.

Semifinals
1	Oshkosh All-Stars	2
3	Akron Firestone Non-Skids	0
2	Sheboygan Red Skins	2
4	Detroit Eagles	1

NBL Championship
1	Oshkosh All-Stars	3
2	Sheboygan Red Skins	0

- Bold Series winner

=== World Professional Basketball Tournament ===
Following the completion of the NBL season, four out of the seven NBL teams (the Chicago Bruins, Detroit Eagles, Oshkosh All-Stars, and Sheboygan Red Skins) competed in the 1941 edition of the World Professional Basketball Tournament in Chicago. The Sheboygan Red Skins and Chicago Bruins were both defeated by the Toledo White Huts in the first round and quarterfinals, respectively. The Detroit Eagles were victorious in the final match against the Oshkosh All-Stars, winning 39–37. The Eagles had beaten both the all-black New York Renaissance and Harlem Globetrotters franchises on their way to the final, while the All-Stars had beaten the White Huts franchise in the semifinal round.

== Statistics ==
=== Leaders ===
Category	Player	Team	Stat
Points	Ben Stephens	Akron Goodyear Wingfoots	265
Free-Throws	Leroy Edwards	Oshkosh All-Stars	76
Field goals	Ben Stephens	Akron Goodyear Wingfoots	98

Note: Prior to the 1969–70 NBA season, league leaders in points were determined by totals rather than averages. Also, rebounding and assist numbers were not recorded properly in the NBL like they would be in the BAA/NBA, as would field goal and free-throw shooting percentages.

== Awards ==
Ben Stephens became the first player not named Leroy Edwards to be named NBL MVP. Ralph Vaughn became the first All-NBL selection to represent multiple teams in the year of his selection.

- NBL Most Valuable Player: Ben Stephens, Akron Goodyear Wingfoots
- NBL Coach of the Year: George Hotchkiss, Oshkosh All-Stars
- NBL Rookie of the Year: Ed Sadowski, Detroit Eagles
- All-NBL First Team:
  - G/F – Jack Ozburn, Akron Firestone Non-Skids
  - G/F – Charley Shipp, Oshkosh All-Stars
  - C – Ed Sadowski, Detroit Eagles
  - C/F – Leroy Edwards, Oshkosh All-Stars
  - G/F – Ben Stephens, Akron Goodyear Wingfoots
  - G – Buddy Jeannette, Detroit Eagles
- All-NBL Second Team:
  - F/G – Bill Hapac, Chicago Bruins
  - F/G – Ralph Vaughn, Hammond Ciesar All-Americans / Chicago Bruins
  - C/F – Jake Pelkington, Akron Goodyear Wingfoots
  - G/F – Bobby Neu, Hammond Ciesar All-Americans
  - G/F – Bob Calihan, Detroit Eagles
  - G/F – Wibs Kautz, Chicago Bruins

== See also ==
- National Basketball League (United States)
