= 1940–41 Akron Goodyear Wingfoots season =

NBL professional basketball team season

- Head coach: Ray Detrick
- Owner: Goodyear
- Arena: Goodyear Hall

Results
- Record: 11–13 (.458)
- Place: Division: T–5th (tied with Chicago Bruins)
- Playoff finish: Did not qualify

The 1940–41 Akron Goodyear Wingfoots season was the Goodyear Wingfoots' fourth year in the United States' National Basketball League (NBL), which was also the fourth year the league existed. However, if you include their previous seasons of existence as an independent team, alongside seasons where they competed in the Amateur Athletic Union, the National Industrial League (not to be confused with the National Industrial Basketball League that they would later compete in, with the Goodyear Wingfoots winning a championship in the NIL in 1932), and what were considered to be predecessors to the NBL in the National Professional Basketball League and the Midwest Basketball Conference (the latter of which the Goodyear Wingfoots won that league's final championship under that name before it folded operations and was considered to be rebranded as the NBL according to some basketball historians), this season would officially be considered their 23rd season of play as a team. This season would see only seven teams competing in the NBL this time around due to the Indianapolis Kautskys opting to leave the league in order to experiment as a barnstorming club (with the Detroit Eagles initially joining them at first also due to venue issues before ultimately returning in time to start the season properly), meaning this season would be the first season where the NBL would compete without any divisions involved whatsoever. For the fourth and final time in the NBL's history, the Goodyear Wingfoots would be one of two works teams from Akron, Ohio participating in the league, with the other team being the rivaling Akron Firestone Non-Skids.

The Wingfoots played their home games at the Goodyear Hall. This season would end up being the worst season in the franchise's history throughout their time in the NBL, with them finishing their season with a below-average 11–13 record. Despite the Goodyear Wingfoots not being able to worry about divisional placement this time around, they would not only finish with a tied record with the Chicago Bruins for a fifth-place finish, but both of those teams would also finish behind the Detroit Eagles by one game for the fourth and final playoff spot, as well as both the Sheboygan Red Skins and Akron Firestone Non-Skids for second place and then the Oshkosh All-Stars for the eventual first place champions of the league. Despite the failures the team had this season, the Goodyear squad would still see Ben Stephens not only be named the NBL's Most Valuable Player (winning the award over Leroy Edwards of the Oshkosh All-Stars, who had won the previous MVP honors for the first three seasons in the NBL's existence), but also be named a member of the All-NBL First Team, with Jake Pelkington also earning All-NBL Second Team honors as well.

== Roster ==
1940–41 Akron Goodyear Wingfoots roster
Players

Pos.	No.	Player	Height	Weight	DOB	From
C		Art Anderson	6 ft 6 in (1.98 m)	190 lb (86 kg)	1916–07–01	Augustana (IL)
G/F		Gene Anderson	6 ft 2 in (1.88 m)	190 lb (86 kg)	1917–10–05	Purdue
G/F		Nick Frascella	6 ft 2 in (1.88 m)	185 lb (84 kg)	1914–07–06	Wooster
F		Marv Huffman	6 ft 2 in (1.88 m)	185 lb (84 kg)	1917–03–14	Indiana
G/F		Bill Lloyd	6 ft 2 in (1.88 m)	180 lb (82 kg)	1915–12–16	St. John's
F/C		Jim Montgomery	6 ft 3 in (1.91 m)	190 lb (86 kg)	1915–04–13	Villanova
G/F		Jake Nagode	6 ft 2 in (1.88 m)	170 lb (77 kg)	1915–07–11	Northwestern
F/C		Jake Pelkington	6 ft 6 in (1.98 m)	220 lb (100 kg)	1915–05–07	Cathedral Prep (NY)
G		Jule Rivlin	5 ft 11 in (1.80 m)	165 lb (75 kg)	1917–02–02	Marshall
G		Steve Sitko	6 ft 0 in (1.83 m)	185 lb (84 kg)	1917–11–18	Notre Dame
G/F		Ben Stephens	6 ft 0 in (1.83 m)	175 lb (79 kg)	1916–11–27	Iowa
G		Howard Vocke	6 ft 0 in (1.83 m)	190 lb (86 kg)	1915–03–16	St. John's
C		John Wiggers	6 ft 9 in (2.06 m)	200 lb (91 kg)	1917–08–06	Morehead State

Coaches
Head coach
- Ray Detrick

Legend
- (DP) Unsigned draft pick
- (FA) Free agent
- (S) Suspended
- Injured

Roster

== Regular season ==
=== Season standings ===
Pos.	League Standings	Wins	Losses	Win %
1	Oshkosh All-Stars	18	6	.750
T–2	Sheboygan Red Skins	13	11	.542
T–2	Akron Firestone Non-Skids	13	11	.542
4	Detroit Eagles	12	12	.500
T–5	Chicago Bruins	11	13	.458
T–5	Akron Goodyear Wingfoots	11	13	.458
7	Hammond Ciesar All-Americans	6	18	.250

=== NBL Schedule ===
Not to be confused with exhibition or other non-NBL scheduled games that did not count towards Akron's official NBL record for this season. An official database created by John Grasso detailing every NBL match possible (outside of two matches that the Kankakee Gallagher Trojans won over the Dayton Metropolitans in 1938) would be released in 2026 showcasing every team's official schedules throughout their time spent in the NBL. As such, these are the official results recorded for the Akron Goodyear Wingfoots during their fourth season in the NBL under that name for the league.

- November 27, 1940 @ Oshkosh, WI: Akron Goodyear Wingfoots 27, Oshkosh All-Stars 44
- November 28, 1940 @ Sheboygan, WI: Akron Goodyear Wingfoots 35, Sheboygan Red Skins 34
- December 1, 1940 @ Hammond, IN: Akron Goodyear Wingfoots 54, Hammond Ciesar All-Americans 38
- December 7, 1940 @ Akron, OH: Sheboygan Red Skins 31, Akron Goodyear Wingfoots 28
- December 13, 1940 @ Akron, OH: Oshkosh All-Stars 43, Akron Goodyear Wingfoots 30
- December 17, 1940 @ Akron, OH: Hammond Ciesar All-Americans 36, Akron Goodyear Wingfoots 39
- December 23, 1940 @ Akron, OH: Akron Goodyear Wingfoots 47, Akron Firestone Non-Skids 33
- December 28, 1940 @ Akron, OH: Chicago Bruins 38, Akron Goodyear Wingfoots 40
- January 2, 1941 @ Sheboygan, WI: Akron Goodyear Wingfoots 31, Sheboygan Red Skins 40
- January 4, 1941 @ Oshkosh, WI: Akron Goodyear Wingfoots 33, Oshkosh All-Stars 35
- January 5, 1941 @ Hammond, IN: Akron Goodyear Wingfoots 46, Hammond Ciesar All-Americans 50
- January 7, 1941 @ Akron, OH: Akron Firestone Non-Skids 44, Akron Goodyear Wingfoots 38
- January 9, 1941 @ Detroit, MI: Akron Goodyear Wingfoots 52, Detroit Eagles 49
- January 13, 1941 @ Akron, OH: Detroit Eagles 31, Akron Goodyear Wingfoots 39
- January 15, 1941: Akron Goodyear Wingfoots 44, Chicago Bruins 38 (OT @ Chicago, IL)
- January 22, 1941 @ Akron, OH: Hammond Ciesar All-Americans 35, Akron Goodyear Wingfoots 42
- January 25, 1941 @ Akron, OH: Akron Goodyear Wingfoots 32, Akron Firestone Non-Skids 29
- February 3, 1941 @ Akron, OH: Sheboygan Red Skins 24, Akron Goodyear Wingfoots 23
- February 5, 1941 @ Chicago, IL: Akron Goodyear Wingfoots 41, Chicago Bruins 42
- February 8, 1941 @ Akron, OH: Detroit Eagles 41, Akron Goodyear Wingfoots 40
- February 11, 1941 @ Akron, OH: Oshkosh All-Stars 40, Akron Goodyear Wingfoots 36
- February 15, 1941 @ Chicago, IL: Akron Goodyear Wingfoots 41, Chicago Bruins 38
- February 22, 1941 @ Akron, OH: Akron Firestone Non-Skids 47, Akron Goodyear Wingfoots 42
- February 27, 1941 @ Detroit, MI: Akron Goodyear Wingfoots 48, Detroit Eagles 50

== NBL Playoffs ==
Due to their worst finish in an NBL season with a less-than average 11–13 record (which was tied alongside the Chicago Bruins this season), the Akron Goodyear Wingfoots would miss out on the NBL Playoffs for their third straight season in a row with them being one game behind the Detroit Eagles for the fourth and final spot in the division-less NBL Playoffs showcasing the final four best teams of the league this season (which, in addition to the Detroit Eagles, also included the inner city rivaling Akron Firestone Non-Skids, the Sheboygan Red Skins, and the new defending NBL champions in the Oshkosh All-Stars).

== Awards and honors ==
- NBL Most Valuable Player – Ben Stephens
- All-NBL First Team – Ben Stephens
- All-NBL Second Team – Jake Pelkington
- All-Time NBL Team – Ben Stephens
