= 1940–41 Sheboygan Red Skins season =

NBL professional basketball team season

- Head coach: Frank Zummach
- Arena: Eagles Auditorium

Results
- Record: 13–11 (.542)
- Place: Division: T–2nd (tied with Akron Firestone Non-Skids)
- Playoff finish: Lost NBL Championship to the Oshkosh All-Stars, 2–1

The 1940–41 Sheboygan Red Skins season was the Red Skins' third year in the United States' National Basketball League (NBL), which would also be the fourth year the NBL itself existed. However, if one were to include their few seasons they played as an independent team under a few various team names involving local businesses like the The Ballhorns (being sponsored by a local florist and funeral parlor), the Art Imigs (being sponsored by a local dry cleaning shop owned and operated by a man named Art Imig with team jerseys saying Art Imig's), and the Enzo Jels (being sponsored by a local gelatin manufacturer known as Enzo-Pac) at various points before becoming the Sheboygan Red Skins due to their promotion up into the NBL, this would officially be their eighth overall season of play as well. For the first time ever in the NBL's history, they would be without divisional play despite starting out the season with only one less team by comparison to their previous two seasons, though this had occurred with the Indianapolis Kautskys deciding to leave the NBL for the purposes of experimenting with themselves as a barnstorming franchise and with the Detroit Eagles initially being considered out as well due to issues with securing a new arena deal alongside a new ownership deal before a last-minute change with them led to them returning to the NBL in time to start out this season properly with seven teams at hand.

The Red Skins played their home games at the Eagles Auditorium. Throughout the season, Sheboygan would see themselves compete for either an average record or an above-average record. By the end of the season, the Red Skins would see themselves get a 15–13 record, which would be tied with the two-time defending champion Akron Firestone Non-Skids (who had gotten to that point after a surprisingly slow and poor start on their ends) for a second-place finish, with the Oshkosh All-Stars taking the first-place finish for the season this time around. Because of the divisionless formatting at hand, Sheboygan and Akron's Firestone squad engaged in a coin flip to decide who would be the official second place spot for this season, with Sheboygan gaining it and getting their semifinal round match-up against the Detroit Eagles following the coin flip's results favoring them. While Detroit would upset Sheboygan in the first game with a one-point loss on the Red Skins' end, Sheboygan would end up utilizing their home court advantage to defeat the Eagles to win their semifinal round 2–1 to face off against their cityside rivals in the Oshkosh All-Stars in the NBL Championship series, which would be a best-of-five series this time around. Unfortunately for Sheboygan, Oshkosh would end up sweeping the Red Skins in a quick 3–0 series beatdown, thus giving the All-Stars their first NBL championship. Weirdly enough, Sheboygan would not get a single player earning a single honor despite earning a second-place finish this season. Not only that, but their poor performance in the 1941 World Professional Basketball Tournament would result in another team joining the NBL the following season afterward in the Toledo Jim White Chevrolets joining when they rebranded themselves from their original Toledo White Huts name.

== Roster ==
1940–41 Sheboygan Red Skins roster
Players

Pos.	No.	Player	Height	Weight	DOB	From
C		Ralph Amsden	6 ft 4 in (1.93 m)	200 lb (91 kg)	1917–01–01	Marquette
C		Ed Dancker	6 ft 7 in (2.01 m)	200 lb (91 kg)	1914–03–14	South Division HS (WI)
F/C		Dick Evans	6 ft 3 in (1.91 m)	205 lb (93 kg)	1915–05–31	Iowa
F/C		George Hesik	6 ft 2 in (1.88 m)	195 lb (88 kg)	1913–06–15	Marquette
G/F		Otto Kolar	6 ft 3 in (1.91 m)	180 lb (82 kg)	1911–12–06	J. Sterling Morton HS (IL)
G/F		Rube Lautenschlager	6 ft 2 in (1.88 m)	190 lb (86 kg)	1915–09–07	UW–Oshkosh
G/F		Bill McDonald	6 ft 3 in (1.91 m)	190 lb (86 kg)	1916–11–05	Marquette
G		Dave Quabius	5 ft 11 in (1.80 m)	185 lb (84 kg)	1916–03–16	Marquette
F		Paul Sokody	6 ft 2 in (1.88 m)	170 lb (77 kg)	1914–08–18	Marquette
G		Ken Suesens	6 ft 1 in (1.85 m)	175 lb (79 kg)	1916–10–23	Iowa

Coaches
Head coach
- Frank Zummach

Legend
- (DP) Unsigned draft pick
- (FA) Free agent
- (S) Suspended
- Injured

Roster

Note: Dick Evans was not on the playoff roster, with Ralph Amsden later not participating in the 1941 World Professional Basketball Tournament alongside Evans.

== Regular season ==
=== Season standings ===
Pos.	League Standings	Wins	Losses	Win %
1	Oshkosh All-Stars	18	6	.750
T–2	Sheboygan Red Skins	13	11	.542
T–2	Akron Firestone Non-Skids	13	11	.542
4	Detroit Eagles	12	12	.500
T–5	Chicago Bruins	11	13	.458
T–5	Akron Goodyear Wingfoots	11	13	.458
7	Hammond Ciesar All-Americans	6	18	.250

=== NBL Schedule ===
Not to be confused with exhibition or other non-NBL scheduled games that did not count towards Sheboygan's official NBL record for this season. An official database created by John Grasso detailing every NBL match possible (outside of two matches that the Kankakee Gallagher Trojans won over the Dayton Metropolitans in 1938) would be released in 2026 showcasing every team's official schedules throughout their time spent in the NBL. As such, these are the official results recorded for the Sheboygan Red Skins during their third season in the NBL.

- November 28, 1940 @ Sheboygan, WI: Akron Goodyear Wingfoots 35, Sheboygan Red Skins 34
- December 6, 1940: Sheboygan Red Skins 43, Akron Firestone Non-Skids 41 (OT @ Akron, OH)
- December 7, 1940 @ Akron, OH: Sheboygan Red Skins 31, Akron Goodyear Wingfoots 28
- December 9, 1940 @ Detroit, MI: Sheboygan Red Skins 33, Detroit Eagles 40
- December 12, 1940 @ Sheboygan, WI: Hammond Ciesar All-Americans 42, Sheboygan Red Skins 54
- December 15, 1940 @ Hammond, IN: Sheboygan Red Skins 40, Hammond Ciesar All-Americans 35
- December 19, 1940 @ Sheboygan, WI: Chicago Bruins 27, Sheboygan Red Skins 20
- December 21, 1940 @ Oshkosh, WI: Sheboygan Red Skins 23, Oshkosh All-Stars 27
- December 26, 1940 @ Sheboygan, WI: Detroit Eagles 32, Sheboygan Red Skins 34
- January 1, 1941 @ Chicago, IL: Sheboygan Red Skins 34, Chicago Bruins 32
- January 2, 1941 @ Sheboygan, WI: Akron Goodyear Wingfoots 31, Sheboygan Red Skins 40
- January 9, 1941 @ Sheboygan, WI: Hammond Ciesar All-Americans 34, Sheboygan Red Skins 33
- January 16, 1941 @ Sheboygan, WI: Akron Firestone Non-Skids 34, Sheboygan Red Skins 36
- January 19, 1941 @ Sheboygan, WI: Oshkosh All-Stars 34, Sheboygan Red Skins 29
- January 25, 1941: Sheboygan Red Skins 40, Oshkosh All-Stars 45 (OT @ Oshkosh, WI)
- January 29, 1941 @ Chicago, IL: Sheboygan Red Skins 22, Chicago Bruins 31
- January 30, 1941 @ Sheboygan, WI: Chicago Bruins 28, Sheboygan Red Skins 31
- February 2, 1941 @ Hammond, IN: Sheboygan Red Skins 49, Hammond Ciesar All-Americans 40
- February 3, 1941 @ Akron, OH: Sheboygan Red Skins 24, Akron Goodyear Wingfoots 23
- February 5, 1941 @ Akron, OH: Sheboygan Red Skins 46, Akron Firestone Non-Skids 54
- February 6, 1941 @ Detroit, MI: Sheboygan Red Skins 47, Detroit Eagles 29
- February 13, 1941 @ Sheboygan, WI: Akron Firestone Non-Skids 48, Sheboygan Red Skins 42
- February 20, 1941 @ Sheboygan, WI: Detroit Eagles 30, Sheboygan Red Skins 54
- February 27, 1941 @ Sheboygan, WI: Oshkosh All-Stars 32, Sheboygan Red Skins 27

== NBL Playoffs ==
=== NBL Semifinals ===
(2(/3)) Sheboygan Red Skins vs. (4) Detroit Eagles: Sheboygan wins series 2–1

- Game 1: March 6, 1941 @ Detroit: Detroit 43, Sheboygan 32
- Game 2: March 7, 1941 @ Sheboygan: Sheboygan 22, Detroit 19
- Game 3: March 8, 1941 @ Sheboygan: Sheboygan 54, Detroit 40

=== NBL Championship ===
(2(/3)) Sheboygan Red Skins vs. (1) Oshkosh All-Stars: Oshkosh wins series 3–0

- Game 1: March 10, 1941 @ Sheboygan: Oshkosh 53, Sheboygan 38
- Game 2: March 11, 1941 @ Oshkosh: Oshkosh 44, Sheboygan 38
- Game 3: March 12, 1941 @ Oshkosh: Oshkosh 54, Sheboygan 36

=== Awards and honors ===
- NBL All-Time Team – Ed Dancker

== World Professional Basketball Tournament ==
For the third year in a row, the Sheboygan Red Skins would participate in the annual World Professional Basketball Tournament in Chicago, which the 1943 event was held on March 15–19, 1941 (with the tournament beginning three days after Sheboygan was swept in the NBL Championship round by the Oshkosh All-Stars.) and was mostly held by independently ran teams (including the Indianapolis Kautskys, who left the NBL the previous year before returning to the NBL the following year, as well as future NBL teams in the Fort Wayne Zollner Pistons and Rochester Seagrams (later Royals) to become the future NBA teams known as the Detroit Pistons and Sacramento Kings) alongside four of the NBL's teams (including the champion Oshkosh All-Stars, who were considered the favorites of the tournament) and the rivaling American Basketball League's own champions, the Philadelphia Sphas. Despite being considered contenders for the WPBT championship this year, the Red Skins would be upset in the first round with a 36–28 loss to the Toledo White Huts (the only mixed race team of the event who was sponsored by a hamburger chain called White Hut who had to borrow team shorts from the Rochester Seagrams alongside buying University of Toledo jerseys, were led by former NBL player Chuck Chuckovits, and were later considered to be the NBL's Toledo Jim White Chevrolets and then potentially the Toledo Jeeps), who would then end up defeating another NBL team in the WPBT in the Chicago Bruins in the quarterfinal round before being defeated by the new NBL champion Oshkosh All-Stars in the semifinal round and then the all-black New York Renaissance in the third place consolation match (with the White Huts later entering the NBL the following season afterward as the Toledo Jim White Chevrolets). This tournament would also lead to the first NBL champion for the WPBT, but it would be by the Detroit Eagles (who had an average 12–12 record for this season and lost in the first round of the NBL Playoffs to Sheboygan themselves) instead of the Oshkosh All-Stars, as they would upset Oshkosh with a 39–37 victory to give the NBL their first WPBT championship representation, if only briefly.

=== Game Played ===
- Lost first round (28–36) to the Toledo White Huts (the eventual NBL Toledo Jim White Chevrolets).
