= 1940–41 Detroit Eagles season =

NBL professional basketball team season

- Head coach: Dutch Dehnert
- Arena: Brodhead Naval Armory

Results
- Record: 12–12 (.500)
- Place: Division: 4th
- Playoff finish: Lost semifinal round to the Sheboygan Red Skins, 2–1; Won 1941 World Professional Basketball Tournament's Championship 39–37 over the Oshkosh All-Stars

The 1940–41 Detroit Eagles season was the fourth and final professional season of play for the Detroit Eagles franchise in the National Basketball League, which also was the fourth season that it existed as a professional basketball league after existing as a semi-pro or amateur basketball league called the Midwest Basketball Conference in its first two seasons in 1935. However, if one were to include their previous seasons where they first started out as a team in the Central Basketball League called the Warren Buckeyes back in 1926 before becoming an independent team called the Warren Crescents, the Corry Keystones of the short-lived original NYPBL, the Warren Merchants, the Warren Transits, and the Warren HyVis Oilers (sometimes shortened down to the Warren HyVis Oils, including during the MBC's second and final season under that name when they entered the MBC that season) before becoming the Warren Penns in their first season of the NBL's official existence, this would officially be the franchise's fifteenth season of existence as a team, including the brief time they would be renamed to the Cleveland White Horses and the unofficial period of time they were known as the Elmira Colonels in the similarly short-lived revived New York-Pennsylvania Basketball League.

== Season overview ==
Originally, they were planned to have joined the Indianapolis Kautskys as one of the two NBL teams to drop out of the league for this season due to the Eagles having issues with securing a new deal with playing in the Detroit Light Guard Armory. However, by November 1940, the Detroit franchise would get their venue situation resolved, which resulted in them rejoining the NBL just in time to start the new season as a seven-team league that would be without divisions in mind for the first time in the league's history. The Eagles would also get new team owners (which involved an executive from Chrysler (known as the Chrysler Motors Corporation at the time), a banker, and an auto dealer) and a new head coach in Dutch Dehnert taking over the remaining roles that long-time member and owner/coach Gerry Archibald held with the team throughout its many years of existence. For this season, each team played two home and away games against each other for 24 league games played for every team in the NBL and the semi-final rounds would have the first and third place teams competing against each other, while the second and fourth place teams competed against each other before the winners of each respective match faced each other in the championship round.

By the end of the regular season, the Eagles finished their season with a worse record than their previous season with an average 12–12 record, which resulted in a completely middle of the road fourth-place finish. However, that record would be just good enough to enter the NBL Playoffs for the second and final time in their history, though this season's playoffs involved the first place team competing against the third place team and the second place team competing against the fourth place team, with the winners competing against each other in the championship series matchup. In Detroit's case, they played against the Sheboygan Red Skins (who was tied for second place with the Akron Firestone Non-Skids), with Sheboygan winning their semi=final round 2–1. The Eagles were also one of four NBL teams to compete in the 1941 World Professional Basketball Tournament alongside the Sheboygan Red Skins, the eventual NBL champion Oshkosh All-Stars, and the Chicago Bruins. Despite them being expected to be eliminated by the second round against the world famous Harlem Globetrotters (the winners of the 1940 WPBT) at the earliest and then the New York Renaissance (another independent all-black team that also won the inaugural event) soon after they beat down the (also independently run) Indianapolis Kautskys in the first round, they ended up upsetting the new NBL champions Oshkosh All-Stars to become the NBL's first ever champions for the WPBT, though they would end up leaving the NBL soon after to become an independent barnstorming team for their final seasons of existence.

By the season's end, the Detroit Eagles would see future Naismith Basketball Hall of Famer Buddy Jeannette and Ed Sadowski make it to the All-NBL First Team (with Sadowski also being named the NBL's Rookie of the Year winner), while Bob Calihan made it to the All-NBL Second Team. Jeannette and Sadowski would also end up making it to the All-WPBT Tournament Team, with Jeannette also being named the MVP of the WPBT for the 1941 year. In addition, the Eagles would also compete in the Max Rosenblum Tournament (an alternative professional basketball tournament later named as the Cleveland Pro Basketball Tournament that was considered somewhat similar to the WPBT that Detroit had recently won) on March 1 and 2, 1941, but they ended up finishing last after losing their matches to the Original Celtics (who would be on a 60-game winning streak following the buzzer-beating loss Detroit had thanks to the mid-court shot done by the Celtics' Bobby McDermott) and the New York Renaissance, with the rivaling American Basketball League's Philadelphia Sphas winning that inaugural tournament.

== Roster ==
Please note that due to the way records for professional basketball leagues like the NBL and the ABL were recorded at the time, some information on both teams and players may be incomplete.

Player	Position
Jake Ahearn	G
Al Benson	C
Jim Brown	G-F
Bob Calihan	G-F
Adam Filipczak	G
Buddy Jeannette	G-F
Bill Lane	F-C
Bernard Opper	G
Eddie Parry	G-F
Jack Piana	F
Ed Sadowski	C
Rusty Saunders	F-C

Note: Adam Filipczak, Bill Lane, Bernard Opper, and Rusty Saunders were not a part of the playoff roster. Not only that, but Jerry Bush would replace Jack Piana on the roster for the 1941 World Professional Basketball Tournament. In addition to that, there was also a player with only the last name of Page being known that only played one game for the Eagles in their final regular season in the NBL, with him also not playing in either the playoffs or the subsequent World Professional Basketball Tournament that they competed in as well.

== Regular season ==
=== NBL Season standings ===
Pos.	League Standings	Wins	Losses	Win %
1	Oshkosh All-Stars	18	6	.750
T–2	Sheboygan Red Skins	13	11	.542
T–2	Akron Firestone Non-Skids	13	11	.542
4	Detroit Eagles	12	12	.500
T–5	Chicago Bruins	11	13	.458
T–5	Akron Goodyear Wingfoots	11	13	.458
7	Hammond Ciesar All-Americans	6	18	.250

=== NBL Schedule ===
Not to be confused with exhibition or other non-NBL scheduled games that did not count towards Detroit's official NBL record for this season. An official database created by John Grasso detailing every NBL match possible (outside of two matches that the Kankakee Gallagher Trojans won over the Dayton Metropolitans in 1938) would be released in 2026 showcasing every team's official schedules throughout their time spent in the NBL. As such, these are the official results recorded for the Detroit Eagles during their fourth and final season (second season under the Detroit Eagles name) in the NBL.

- December 4, 1940 @ Detroit, MI: Akron Firestone Non-Skids 41, Detroit Eagles 35
- December 9, 1940 @ Detroit, MI: Sheboygan Red Skins 33, Detroit Eagles 40
- December 13, 1940 @ Akron, OH: Detroit Eagles 34, Akron Firestone Non-Skids 33
- December 18, 1940 @ Detroit, MI: Hammond Ciesar All-Americans 36, Detroit Eagles 43
- December 26, 1940 @ Sheboygan, WI: Detroit Eagles 32, Sheboygan Red Skins 34
- December 28, 1940 @ Oshkosh, WI: Detroit Eagles 37, Oshkosh All-Stars 52
- January 3, 1941 @ Detroit, MI: Akron Firestone Non-Skids 42, Detroit Eagles 52
- January 8, 1941 @ Chicago, IL: Detroit Eagles 30, Chicago Bruins 39
- January 9, 1941 @ Detroit, MI: Akron Goodyear Wingfoots 52, Detroit Eagles 49
- January 12, 1941 @ Akron, OH: Detroit Eagles 42, Akron Firestone Non-Skids 48
- January 13, 1941 @ Akron, OH: Detroit Eagles 31, Akron Goodyear Wingfoots 39
- January 17, 1941 @ Detroit, MI: Chicago Bruins 43, Detroit Eagles 45
- January 23, 1941 @ Detroit, MI: Hammond Ciesar All-Americans 52, Detroit Eagles 61
- January 29, 1941 @ Detroit, MI: Oshkosh All-Stars 34, Detroit Eagles 36
- February 6, 1941 @ Detroit, MI: Sheboygan Red Skins 47, Detroit Eagles 29
- February 8, 1941 @ Akron, OH: Detroit Eagles 41, Akron Goodyear Wingfoots 40
- February 13, 1941 @ Detroit, MI: Oshkosh All-Stars 41, Detroit Eagles 30
- February 17, 1941 @ Detroit, MI: Chicago Bruins 46, Detroit Eagles 52
- February 19, 1941 @ Chicago, IL: Detroit Eagles 28, Chicago Bruins 55
- February 20, 1941 @ Sheboygan, WI: Detroit Eagles 30, Sheboygan Red Skins 54
- February 22, 1941 @ Oshkosh, WI: Detroit Eagles 57, Oshkosh All-Stars 59
- February 23, 1941 (Game 1 @ Hammond, IN): Detroit Eagles 47, Hammond Ciesar All-Americans 42
- February 23, 1941 (Game 2 @ Hammond, IN): Detroit Eagles 40, Hammond Ciesar All-Americans 39
- February 27, 1941 @ Detroit, MI: Akron Goodyear Wingfoots 48, Detroit Eagles 50

== NBL Playoffs ==
=== NBL Semifinals ===
(2) Sheboygan Red Skins vs. (4) Detroit Eagles: Sheboygan wins series 2–1

- Game 1: March 6, 1941 @ Detroit: Detroit 43, Sheboygan 32
- Game 2: March 7, 1941 @ Sheboygan: Sheboygan 22, Detroit 19
- Game 3: March 8, 1941 @ Sheboygan: Sheboygan 54, Detroit 40

=== Awards and honors ===
- First Team All-NBL – Buddy Jeannette and Ed Sadowski
- Second Team All-NBL – Bob Calihan
- NBL Rookie of the Year Award – Ed Sadowski
- NBL All-Time Team – Buddy Jeannette

== World Professional Basketball Tournament ==
After declining to participate in the first two World Professional Basketball Tournaments held in 1939 and 1940, the Detroit Eagles would join the new NBL champion Oshkosh All-Stars, the Sheboygan Red Skins (the team that eliminated them in the 1941 NBL Playoffs), and the Chicago Bruins (the runner-up team from the 1940 WPBT) as over half of the teams representing the NBL this season joined in for the 1941 World Professional Basketball Tournament held at the International Amphitheater in Chicago, which took place March 15–19, 1941. The Eagles' debut in the WPBT would have them compete in the tournament where, in addition to the other NBL teams that joined the event, they were mostly going up against other teams that were considered independently run franchises (including the Indianapolis Kautskys, who left the NBL the previous year before returning to the NBL the following year, as well as future NBL teams in the Fort Wayne Zollner Pistons and Rochester Seagrams (later Royals) to become the future NBA teams known as the Detroit Pistons and Sacramento Kings) alongside the rivaling American Basketball League's own champions, the Philadelphia Sphas. In the first round on March 15, the Eagles would face off against the Indianapolis Kautskys, the team that left the NBL to become a barnstorming team this season. While Carlisle Towery led the Kautskys with 11 total points scored for their team, both Ed Sadowski and Bob Calihan both led the Eagles with 19 points each as Detroit defeated the former NBL team with a 58–43 beatdown for what would later become the easiest match the Eagles would have in the WPBT for this year's event.

In the only second round that would be played the following day on March 16, Detroit would go up against the world famous Harlem Globetrotters, the defending champions of the World Professional Basketball Tournament. As per usual from the Harlem Globetrotters, they would compete in this match (much like in other previous WPBT matches) by utilizing their typical mixture of comedic chicanery with the intent to win the game as best they could. However, this game in question would prove to be a very low-scoring effort from both teams, especially from the Eagles' ends since the Globetrotters only scored 38 points in their first round match. Despite that, Detroit would keep the game very close to make it end in a 37–36 victory for them, with Ed Sadowski leading the team in scoring with 12 points.

After a day of rest that the Eagles had over the rest of the competition at hand, their semi-final round opponent would be the very first winners of the World Professional Basketball Tournament, the New York Renaissance. Similar to the Harlem Globetrotters by this point in time, the New York Renaissance were an independent barnstorming team that was all-black like the Globetrotters were, with the only difference involving the Renaissance being their performance as a team was 100% serious on their ends. While many people attending expected New York to defeat Detroit to have the Renaissance squad likely go up against the new NBL champions, the Eagles would end up stunning the second straight championship winning team in the WPBT in another close match with a 43–42 victory to see them go into the championship round. Detroit's main players that helped get them the victory were Ed Sadowski with 16 points and Bob Calihan with 8 points, while the Renaissance had a tie for the leading scorers of the team with both Pop Gates and Wilmeth Sidat-Singh (the latter being his last match in the WPBT before dying during service in World War II) scoring 11 points.

=== Scores ===
- Won first round (58–43) over the Indianapolis Kautskys
- Won quarterfinal round (37–36) over the Harlem Globetrotters
- Won semifinal round (43–42) over the New York Renaissance
- Won championship round (39–37) over the Oshkosh All-Stars

=== Awards and honors ===
- Buddy Jeannette, All-Tournament Team, MVP
- Ed Sadowski, All-Tournament Team
