= Willie Phillips =

Willie Phillips may refer to:

- Willie Phillips (footballer) (1911–1992), Scottish footballer
- Willie Phillips (basketball) (born c. 1915), American basketball player
- Willie L. Phillips, American attorney and chairman of the Federal Energy Regulatory Commission

== See also ==
- William Phillips (disambiguation)
