= Herbert Ball =

Herbert or Herb Ball may refer to:

- Herb Ball (1918–2000), American professional basketball player
- Herbert Henry Ball (1863–1943), Canadian politician and journalist
