= Filipczak =

Filipczak is a Polish surname. Notable people with the surname include:

- Adam Filipczak (1915–1992), American basketball player
- Marek Filipczak (born 1960), Polish footballer
