= 1940–41 Philadelphia Sphas season =

American basketball team season

- League champions
- League: American Basketball League (revived original)
- Head coach: Eddie Gottlieb
- General manager: Eddie Gottlieb
- Owner(s): Eddie Gottlieb
- Arena: Broadwood Hotel

Results
- Record: 18–13 (.581)
- Place: Conference: 1st (1st half), 4th (2nd half)
- Playoff finish: ABL Champions (Won 3–1 over Brooklyn Celtics); Lost 1941 WPBT Quarterfinals to Oshkosh All-Stars, 31–38

The Philadelphia Sphas were an early, historical example of an American professional basketball team. The 1940–41 season was the eighth season played in the now-revived American Basketball League by the Sphas, although they did play in the original rendition of the ABL from 1926 to 1928 as the Philadelphia Warriors, which had no relation to the later BAA franchise of the same name that now exists in the present day as the Golden State Warriors in the NBA. As such, when including the past history of the original ABL with the revived version of the ABL in 1933 following historical problems that related to the Great Depression near the end of 1931, this would technically be the fourteenth official season played by the original ABL properly, though this would officially be the 24th season of play for the Sphas franchise when including previous seasons where they played under names like the "Philadelphia YMHA"; the "Philadelphia Passon, Gottlieb, Black", the "Philadelphia Warriors"; and the "Philadelphia Hebrews".

== Background ==
The Sphas played in leagues around Philadelphia since 1917, but game-by-game records before the Sphas rejoined the ABL in 1933 are not (currently) available (at least, not to the general public if official game records did exist for the Sphas) and are therefore likely lost to time itself. After previously having two seasons where the ABL played under a full, proper regular season before either having a playoff format or round-robin tournament to determine its champion, the ABL decided to return to its original format of having two half-seasons where the champion would be determined by a championship series of sorts (this time being a best-of-five series similar to what the rivaling National Basketball League had instead of the original best-of-seven series that the ABL had beforehand).

Due to the ABL having the number of teams in their league decrease to only five total teams from the previous season, the ABL would end up decreasing the number of games played throughout each half-season this time around. As such, when trying to repeat as champions in the ABL once again and be crowned champions for the fifth time in eighth seasons, the Sphas would appear to have an easy time with the rest of the league when they finished the first half of the season with an incredibly above-average 11–4 conclusion for a first place finish there, being one and a half games ahead of the second place New York Jewels there. When trying to secure their place as the official champions of the league with a repeat by the second half of the season, however, the Sphas would end up performing a lot more poorly than they expected themselves to (even after winning the (inaugural) 1941 Max Rosenblum Tournament (later rebranded as the Cleveland Pro Basketball Tournament) over the Original Celtics, the all-black New York Renaissance, and the rivaling NBL's Detroit Eagles and then later competing in the 1941 World Professional Basketball Tournament this time around), to the point where they finished with a below-average 7–9 record for a fourth place finish, which put them ahead of only the Baltimore Clippers this time around (though being a half-game behind the Washington Brewers for a third place finish (due to Washington having a 7–8 finish there) and a full-game behind the average New York Jewels (who had an 8–8 record during that half of the season) for a much better second place finish instead). Luckily for the Sphas, their first half season performance would have them competing against the season's second half champions in the Troy turned Brooklyn Celtics during this season in a now best-of-five championship series. After Philadelphia and the Celtics split their first two games in the championship series, the Sphas would secure their fifth ABL championship (and second repeat championship period in the ABL) by having a 50–43 victory in Game 3 and then a close 30–29 victory in Game 4. This would later become the only season of play for the Brooklyn Celtics while playing under that name for the revived ABL, as the Brooklyn Celtics would (temporarily) disband operations following the end of the season, likely due to the growing presence of World War II; the Celtics would later come back for one more season in the ABL under the Troy Celtics name for the 1946–47 ABL season before later becoming defunct for good by the 1950s when they eventually got bought by Abe Saperstein and the Harlem Globetrotters alongside the New York Renaissance and Sphas later on.

== Roster ==
Due to information on American Basketball League players being generally hard to find, there are bound to be more gaps and/or inaccuracies found in certain areas on the team's roster spots than usual.

1940–41 Philadelphia Sphas roster
Players

Pos.	No.	Player	Height	Weight	DOB	From
F/C		Moe Goldman	6 ft 3 in (1.91 m)	175 lb (79 kg)	1913–05–30	CCNY
G/F		Shikey Gotthoffer	6 ft 0 in (1.83 m)	195 lb (88 kg)	1911–01–01	NYU
G		Leo Gottlieb	5 ft 11 in (1.80 m)	180 lb (82 kg)	1920–11–28	DeWitt Clinton HS (NY)
G		Cy Kaselman	5 ft 10 in (1.78 m)	165 lb (75 kg)	1909–05–01	Temple
F/C		Inky Lautman	6 ft 2 in (1.88 m)	205 lb (93 kg)	1914–05–22	Central HS (PA)
F/C		Lou Possner	6 ft 3 in (1.91 m)	180 lb (82 kg)	1917–08–11	DePaul
F/C		Red Rosan	6 ft 2 in (1.88 m)	195 lb (88 kg)	1911–05–22	Temple
G		Petey Rosenberg	5 ft 10 in (1.78 m)	165 lb (75 kg)	1918–04–07	Saint Joseph's
F		Irv Torgoff	6 ft 2 in (1.88 m)	192 lb (87 kg)	1917–03–06	Long Island
G		Butch Weintraub	5 ft 11 in (1.80 m)	190 lb (86 kg)	1917–10–08	CCNY
G		Red Wolfe	5 ft 11 in (1.80 m)	165 lb (75 kg)	1905–07–18	St. John's

Coaches
Head coach
- Eddie Gottlieb

Legend
- (DP) Unsigned draft pick
- (FA) Free agent
- (S) Suspended
- Injured

Note: Moe Goldman, Leo Gottlieb (not related to team owner, general manager, and head coach Eddie Gottlieb), Lou Possner, and Butch Weintraub would not play for the team during the 1941 ABL Championship Series. Not only that, but Mike Bloom and Nat Frankel would end up joining the team for the 1941 World Professional Basketball Tournament.

== ABL Standings ==
First Half
Team	Wins	Losses	Winning %
Philadelphia SPHAs	11	4	.733
New York Jewels	9	5	.643
Washington Brewers	7	7	.500
Troy Celtics / Brooklyn Celtics^{[a]}	4	7	.364
Baltimore Clippers	3	11	.214

Second Half
Team	Wins	Losses	Winning %
Brooklyn Celtics^{[a]}	11	4	.733
New York Jewels	8	8	.500
Washington Brewers	7	8	.467
Philadelphia SPHAs	7	9	.438
Baltimore Clippers	6	10	.375

== ABL Schedule ==
After the previous two seasons saw the ABL utilizing full regular seasons like the rivaling National Basketball League had done, the American Basketball League went back to utilizing two halves for their whole season once again, with the two best teams competing against each other for the championship series once again (albeit in a best of five series this time around instead of in a best of seven series like in the past).

First Half
#	Date	Opponent	Score	Record
1A	November 16	New York Jewels	31–38	0–1
2A	November 23	Troy Celtics^{[a]}^{[c]}	44–30	1–1
3A	December 6	@ Baltimore Clippers	44–39	2–1
4A	December 7	Baltimore Clippers	37–35	3–1
5A	December 8	@ Washington Brewers	27–20	4–1
6A	December 14	New York Jewels	42–34	5–1
7A	December 15	@ New York Jewels	40–20	6–1
8A	December 21	Brooklyn Celtics^{[a]}	31–38	6–2
9A	December 28	Washington Brewers	50–34	7–2
10A	January 3	@ Baltimore Clippers	36–34	8–2
11A	January 4	Baltimore Clippers	51–46 (OT)	9–2
12A	January 5	@ New York Jewels	37–38	9–3
13A	January 11	Washington Brewers	43–33	10–3
14A	January 18	Brooklyn Celtics^{[a]}	44–42	11–3
15A	January 19	@ Washington Brewers	28–37	11–4

Second Half
#	Date	Opponent	Score	Record
1B	January 24	@ Baltimore Clippers	33–38	0–1
2B	January 25	New York Jewels	32–45	0–2
3B	February 1	Baltimore Clippers	30–43	0–3
4B	February 2	@ Brooklyn Celtics^{[a]}	41–42 (OT)	0–4
5B	February 8	Brooklyn Celtics^{[a]}	49–44	1–4
6B	February 9	@ New York Jewels	40–32	2–4
7B	February 15	New York Jewels	47–54	2–5
8B	February 21	@ Baltimore Clippers	48–46	3–5
9B	February 22	Washington Brewers	48–45 (OT)	4–5
10B	February 23	@ Washington Brewers	39–35	5–5
11B	March 9	@ Washington Brewers	34–51	5–6
12B	March 12	Brooklyn Celtics^{[a]}^{[b]}	45–41 (OT)	6–6
13B	March 15	Brooklyn Celtics^{[a]}	32–44	6–7
14B	March 22	Baltimore Clippers	36–42	6–8
15B	March 23	@ New York Jewels	45–43	7–8
16B	March 29	Washington Brewers	38–50	7–9

Championship Series
Game	Date	Opponent	Score	Record
Game 1	April 5	Brooklyn Celtics^{[a]}	48–38	1–0
Game 2	April 6	@ Brooklyn Celtics^{[a]}	26–40	1–1
Game 3	April 13	Brooklyn Celtics^{[a]}	50–43	2–1
Game 4	April 14	@ Brooklyn Celtics^{[a]}	30–29	3–1

== Awards and honors ==
By the end of the season, Petey Rosenberg would end up being the leading scorer of the entire league for the eighth season of its return and its fourteenth overall season of its existence with 278 points scored for an average of 8.9 points per game. This marked the first time since Bobby McDermott from the Brooklyn Visitations back in the 1935–36 season where the league's leading scorer would end up averaging under 10 points per game, though it wouldn't be the last season in the ABL would end up having a leading scorer getting under 10 points per game (though it would be the last season there would a leading scorer would average under 9 points per game).

== Notes ==
^{a} At some point during the first half of the season (currently, it's not known exactly when it happened, but it happened sometime in-between November 23 and December 21, 1940), the Troy Celtics moved from Troy, New York to nearby Brooklyn, New York to become the Brooklyn Celtics.
^{b} Game was played in Washington, D.C.
^{c} Game was played in Saratoga Springs, New York.

== World Professional Basketball Tournament ==
After the Philadelphia Sphas had previously missed out on the inaugural World Professional Basketball Tournament due to too many injuries affecting their team back in 1939 (which led to their spot being replaced by the Illinois Grads team that had involved college graduates from Champaign, Illinois that year) and couldn't participate in the 1940 event to make up for the previous year's absence due to the ABL's round-robin championship tournament conflicting with the WPBT that year, the Sphas would have a proper return/introduction to the event with the 1941 World Professional Basketball Tournament as the sole representative team of the ABL, with that event being held from March 15–19, 1941 (during the time the Sphas were still competing in the second half of the ABL's regular season under low stakes on their ends) and was mostly held by independently ran teams (including the Indianapolis Kautskys, who left the rivaling National Basketball League the previous year before returning to the NBL the following year, as well as future NBL teams in the Fort Wayne Zollner Pistons and Rochester Seagrams (later Royals) to become the future NBA teams known as the Detroit Pistons and Sacramento Kings) alongside four of the rivaling National Basketball League's teams (including the new NBL champion Oshkosh All-Stars, who were considered the favorites of the tournament for that year). In the first round of that tournament on March 16, the Sphas would go up against the Bismarck Phantoms from Bismarck, North Dakota (who apparently had Johnny Kundla as a part of the team's roster (though he presumably didn't play in the tournament that year)), with the Sphas blowing out the upstart Phantoms franchise with a 48–30 victory after previously being tied 11–11 in the first quarter. In the quarterfinal round (which was dubbed at the time as "the 'little' world series between the National League and American League" due to both league champions competing against each other early on in the tournament), however, Philadelphia would go up against the new, rivaling NBL champions in the Oshkosh All-Stars, who had won their first league championship by sweeping both the previous two-time defending NBL champion Akron Firestone Non-Skids and the Sheboygan Red Skins in their NBL playoff run that season; the Sphas would end up being defeated 38–31 during the second and final WPBT match that Philadelphia would ever compete in. While the Oshkosh All-Stars would eventually go all the way into the championship round before losing in an upset defeat by another NBL team that was competing in the event in the Detroit Eagles (who themselves would later leave the NBL to become a barnstorming franchise of sorts themselves (similar to what the NBL's Indianapolis Kautskys had done this season) following this event's conclusion after previously being eliminated in the NBL Playoffs earlier on by the Sheboygan Red Skins), the Philadelphia Sphas would never have another chance to compete in the WPBT throughout the entire tournament's history following their only official appearance in 1941 due to a combination of World War II's growing presence, the formation of the future rivaling Basketball Association of America (which team owner, general manager, and head coach Eddie Gottlieb would serve as a major figure for (as well as the only inaugural representative there who had any prior basketball experience whatsoever at the time) by that time for a new Philadelphia Warriors squad to be created in said league), and later seeing the Sphas eventually moving to Atlantic City, New Jersey (if only briefly) once the tournament's relevance for the best professional basketball team around was starting to wane. Not only that, but the ABL's commissioner in question, John J. O'Brien, viewed the WPBT as a lesser quality tournament in the ABL's eyes than what the rivaling NBL had seen it as at the time due to the varying quality of teams joining for what would usually be seen as a week long event (with team quality ranging from high quality teams like the New York Renaissance and the world-famous Harlem Globetrotters to teams that were seemingly only created for the tournament's existence only) and not seeing it as any better than other basketball tournaments held in places like Cleveland, Rochester, or Worcester, Massachusetts, hence why the ABL would see less of their teams competing in that tournament throughout the years by comparison to the rivaling NBL.

=== Games ===
- Won first round (48–30) over the Bismarck Phantoms
- Lost quarterfinal round (31–38) to the Oshkosh All-Stars
