= Dar Hutchins =

American basketball player

Personal information
- Born: December 9, 1915 New York
- Died: October 9, 1985 (aged 69) Hinsdale, Illinois
- Listed height: 6 ft 5 in (1.96 m)
- Listed weight: 195 lb (88 kg)

Career information
- High school: Thornton (Harvey, Illinois)
- College: Bradley (1936–1939)
- Position: Forward / center

Career history
- 1939–1941: Hammond Ciesar All-Americans

Darwin P. Hutchins (December 9, 1915 – October 9, 1985) was an American professional basketball player. He played in the National Basketball League for the Hammond Ciesar All-Americans and averaged 6.8 points per game for his career.
