= Hale Swanson =

American basketball and baseball player

Personal information
- Born: September 6, 1914 La Porte, Indiana, U.S.
- Died: April 9, 1990 (aged 75) Chicago Heights, Illinois, U.S.
- Listed height: 6 ft 3 in (1.91 m)
- Listed weight: 200 lb (91 kg)

Career information
- High school: Bloom (Chicago Heights, Illinois)
- College: Illinois (1934–1937)
- Position: Guard / forward

Career history
- 1939: Hammond Ciesar All-Americans

Harold Arthur "Hale" Swanson (September 6, 1914 – April 9, 1990) was an American professional basketball player as well as minor league baseball player. He played in the National Basketball League for the Hammond Ciesar All-Americans in 1939–40 but did not score a point in two career games. In baseball, he played in the St. Louis Cardinals' farm system for seven different teams between 1937 and 1946.
