= Bill Hapac =

American basketball player (1918–1967)

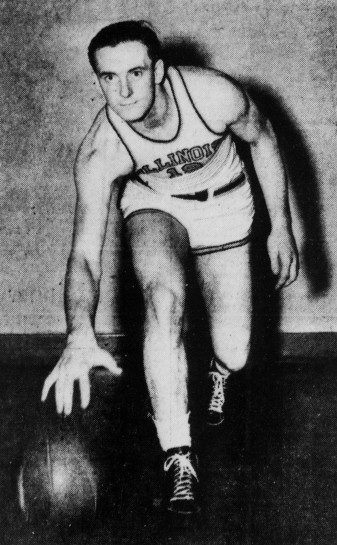
- Hapac c. 1939

Personal information
- Born: January 26, 1918 Chicago, Illinois, US
- Died: March 9, 1967 (aged 49) Chicago, Illinois, US
- Listed height: 6 ft 2 in (1.88 m)
- Listed weight: 190 lb (86 kg)

Career information
- High school: J. Sterling Morton (Cicero, Illinois)
- College: Illinois (1937–1940)
- Playing career: 1940–1948
- Position: Guard / forward
- Number: 19

Career history
- 1940–1941: Chicago Bruins
- 1945–1946: Chicago American Gears
- 1946–1947: Anderson Packers
- 1947–1948: Oshkosh All-Stars

Career highlights
- All-NBL Second Team (1941); Consensus first-team All-American (1940); First-team All-Big Ten (1940)

William John "Wild Bill" Hapac (January 26, 1918 – March 9, 1967) was the first consensus All-American to play for the University of Illinois men's basketball team when he garnered the recognition during his senior season of 1939–40. A native of Chicago, Illinois, Hapac was an all-state player for J. Sterling Morton High School East in 1935.

Hapac would star for the Fighting Illini before playing in the National Basketball League from 1940 to 1948. He set a then-unheard of Big Ten Conference single game scoring record of 34 points against Minnesota on February 10, 1940. His senior year, he was honored as a Consensus NCAA First Team All-American and was the first ever recipient of the University of Illinois' Athlete of the Year award. In addition to basketball, Hapac also lettered for three years while playing for the school's baseball team.

Hapac played professionally for the Chicago Bruins for the 1940–41 season, followed by four years of military service. He returned to the NBL in 1945, playing for the Chicago American Gears for the 1945–46 season, the Anderson Packers for the 1946–47 season and the Oshkosh All-Stars for the 1947–48 season. Hapac finished his professional career by playing for an independent league team, the Chicago Ingots, for the 1947–48 season.

== Military and beyond ==
Hapac was pursued by the Detroit Tigers, but while waiting for spring training to begin, he was inducted into the US Army, eventually earning him the rank of captain. Hapac coached basketball with fellow Illini player, Jim Vopicka, at Morton East from 1952 until his death in 1967 at 49 years of age of an undisclosed rare disease. Shortly after his death, the newly constructed gymnasium at Morton East was dedicated to his memory.

== Honors ==
- 1940 – Consensus All-American
- 1940 – First-team All-Big Ten
- 1940 – University of Illinois Athlete of the Year
- 1973 – Inducted into the Illinois Basketball Coaches Association's Hall of Fame as a player.
- September 13, 2008 – Honored jersey which hangs in the State Farm Center to show regard for being the most decorated basketball players in the University of Illinois' history.

== Statistics ==
=== College ===
Season	Games	Points	PPG	Big Ten Record	Overall Record	Postseason
1937–38	18	110	6.1	4–8	9–9	–
1938–39	22	101	4.6	9–3	13–3	Big Ten All-Conference 2nd team
1939–40	18	244	13.6	7–5	14–6	Consensus All-American
**Totals**	**58**	**455**	**7.8**	**20–16**	**36–18**	

=== NBL ===
Legend
GP	Games played	MPG	Minutes per game
FG%	Field-goal percentage	FT%	Free-throw percentage
RPG	Rebounds per game	APG	Assists per game
PPG	Points per game	**Bold**	Career high

=== Regular season ===
Year	Team	GP	MPG	FG%	FT%	RPG	APG	PPG
1940–41	Chicago	24	–	–	.626	–	–	**9.5**
1945–46	Chicago	19	–	–	.573	–	–	5.5
1946–47	Anderson	41	–	–	**.678**	–	–	6.8
1947–48	Oshkosh	**47**	–	–	.621	–	–	6.8
Career		131	–	–	.634	–	–	6.4

=== Playoffs ===
Year	Team	GP	MPG	FG%	FT%	RPG	APG	PPG
1940–41	Chicago	1	–	–	.333	–	–	5.0
1945–46	Chicago	**4**	–	–	.333	–	–	1.5
1946–47	Anderson	2	–	–	.615	–	–	**6.0**
1947–48	Oshkosh	**4**	–	–	**.688**	–	–	5.8
Career		11	–	–	.579	–	–	4.2
