= Joe Spudic =

American basketball player (1912–1999)

Personal information
- Born: December 24, 1912 Indiana, U.S.
- Died: June 21, 1999 (aged 86) Munster, Indiana, U.S.
- Listed height: 6 ft 4 in (1.93 m)
- Position: Forward

Career history
- 1938–1939: Calumet A.C.
- 1939: Hammond Ciesar All-Americans
- 1939–1940: La Salle Steel
- 1939–1940: Sinclair Oilers
- 1940: Industrial All-Stars

Joseph Thomas "Bones" Spudic (December 24, 1912 – June 21, 1999) was an American professional basketball player. He played in the National Basketball League for the Hammond Ciesar All-Americans in two games during the 1939–40 season. Swihart averaged 1.0 points per game.
