= Joe Sotak =

American basketball player (1914–2007)

Personal information
- Born: February 9, 1914 Whiting, Indiana! U.S.
- Died: December 11, 2007 (aged 93) Whiting, Indiana, U.S.
- Listed height: 6 ft 2 in (1.88 m)
- Listed weight: 210 lb (95 kg)

Career information
- High school: Catholic Central (Hammond, Indiana)
- Playing career: 1933–1941
- Position: Power forward / center

Career history
- 1933–1934: Whiting Macks
- 1934–1936: Whiting Ciesars
- 1936–1938: Whiting Ciesar All-Americans
- 1938–1941: Hammond Ciesar All-Americans

Joseph John Sotak (February 9, 1914 – December 11, 2007) was an American professional basketball player. He played in the National Basketball League for Whiting/Hammond Ciesar All-Americans and averaged 4.1 points per game.
