= Bob Weigandt =

American basketball player and coach (1914–2008)

Personal information
- Born: February 5, 1914 Oshkosh, Wisconsin, U.S.
- Died: February 26, 2008 (aged 94) Whitewater, Wisconsin, U.S.
- Listed height: 5 ft 10 in (1.78 m)
- Listed weight: 190 lb (86 kg)

Career information
- College: Wisconsin (1936–1939)
- Position: Guard

Career history

Playing
- 1939: Oshkosh All-Stars

Coaching
- 1950–1967: Wisconsin–Whitewater

Robert George Weigandt (February 5, 1914 – February 26, 2008) was an American professional basketball player and college coach. He played for the Oshkosh All-Stars of the National Basketball League in just one game during the 1938–39 season.

Weigandt then served in the U.S. Navy during World War II. When he returned, he coached basketball, golf, tennis, and football at the University of Wisconsin–Whitewater before retiring in 1980.
