= Sam Lifschultz =

American basketball coach

Personal information
- Born: January 7, 1905
- Died: December 25, 1951 (aged 46)

Career history

Coaching
- 192?–193?: Crane Tech School
- 193?–193?: Lifschultz Fast Freight
- 1939–1940: Chicago Bruins

Samuel E. Lifschultz (January 7, 1905 – December 25, 1951) was an American professional basketball coach for the Chicago Bruins, leading the franchise's first season in the United States' National Basketball League (NBL). He coached for just the 1939–40 season in which the team finished with record of 14–14. That squad's stars were rookies out of the Loyola University Chicago, Mike Novak and Wibs Kautz.

Lifschultz had also coached at Crane Tech School in Chicago, Illinois, junior college teams, and Lifschultz Fast Freight in the AAU.

He left coaching to pursue business interests full time.

== Head coaching record ==
Legend
Regular season	G	Games coached	W	Games won	L	Games lost	W–L %	Win–loss %
Playoffs	PG	Playoff games	PW	Playoff wins	PL	Playoff losses	PW–L %	Playoff win–loss %

Team	Year	G	W	L	W–L%	Finish	PG	PW	PL	PW–L%	Result
Chicago	1939–40	28	14	14	.500	3rd in Western	—	—	—	—	Missed playoffs
Total		28	14	14	.500		—	—	—	—	
