= Harold Dembo =

American basketball player

Personal information
- Born: December 24, 1915 Chicago, Illinois
- Died: May 24, 2006 (aged 90) Northbrook, Illinois
- Listed height: 5 ft 7 in (1.70 m)
- Listed weight: 145 lb (66 kg)

Career information
- College: Illinois Wesleyan (1935–1937)
- Position: Forward

Career history
- 1938–1939: Chicago Cavaliers
- 1939: Chicago Bruins

Harold Harry Dembo (December 24, 1915 – May 24, 2006) was an American professional basketball player. He played in the National Basketball League for the Chicago Bruins in two games during the 1939–40 season.
