= Emmet Birk =

American basketball player

Personal information
- Born: March 21, 1914 Grafton, North Dakota, U.S.
- Died: November 6, 2000 (aged 86) Whittier, California, U.S.
- Listed height: 6 ft 1 in (1.85 m)
- Listed weight: 185 lb (84 kg)

Career information
- High school: Park River (Park River, North Dakota)
- College: North Dakota (1934–1937)
- Position: Forward

Career history
- 1938: Oshkosh All-Stars
- 1939–1941: Bismarck Phantoms

Career highlights
- UND Hall of Fame (1977)

Emmet Clifford Birk (March 21, 1914 – November 6, 2000) was an American professional basketball player. He played for the Oshkosh All-Stars in the National Basketball League for one game during the 1938–39 season. In college, he played for the University of North Dakota (UND), where he won North Central Conference championships all three years he played. He was inducted into the UND Hall of Fame in 1977.

In his post-basketball career, Birk spent five years serving in the Army during World War II. He then moved to Whittier, California and spent 45 years as a schoolteacher and coach.
