= Ray Hayes (basketball) =

American basketball player

Personal information
- Born: December 17, 1905 Chenoa, Illinois
- Died: July 30, 1986 (aged 80) Des Moines, Iowa
- Listed height: 6 ft 0 in (1.83 m)
- Listed weight: 180 lb (82 kg)

Career information
- College: Chicago
- Position: Guard / forward

Career history

Playing
- 1940: Chicago Bruins

Coaching
- 1940–1943, 1959–1960?: Arlington HS

Raymond Elton Hayes (December 17, 1905 – July 30, 1986) was an American professional basketball player. He played in the National Basketball League for the Chicago Bruins in four games during the 1939–40 season and averaged 0.8 points per game. He later worked at Socony Vacuum Oil Company and coached high school basketball and baseball.
