= Lou Possner =

American basketball player (1917–1990)

Personal information
- Born: August 11, 1917
- Died: March 6, 1990 (aged 72)
- Listed height: 6 ft 3 in (1.91 m)

Career information
- High school: Marshall (Chicago, Illinois)
- College: DePaul (1938–1940)
- Position: Power forward / center

Career history
- 1940–1941: Philadelphia Sphas
- 1941–1942: Chicago Bruins
- 1944–1945: Paterson Crescents
- 1946–1947: Syracuse Nationals

Career highlights
- Second-team All-American – MSG (1940)

Louis Leonard Possner (August 11, 1917 – March 8, 1990) was a Jewish American basketball player. Possner was an All-American center/power forward at DePaul University. Following the close of his college career, Possner played parts of two seasons with the United States' National Basketball League (NBL), a league that in 1948 would merge with the Basketball Association of America to create the National Basketball Association. Possner played for the NBL's Chicago Bruins and Syracuse Nationals, averaging 2.0 points per game for his NBL career. Possner, also played in the competing American Basketball League, for the Philadelphia Sphas and Paterson Crescents.
