= Byron Bell (basketball) =

American basketball player

Bryon Bell
Personal information
- Born: June 9, 1914 Neenah, Wisconsin, U.S.
- Died: October 18, 2008 (aged 94) Bettendorf, Iowa, U.S.
- Listed height: 6 ft 3 in (1.91 m)
- Listed weight: 180 lb (82 kg)

Career information
- High school: Neenah (Neenah, Wisconsin)
- College: Wisconsin (1936–1939)
- Position: Center

Career history
- 1938: Oshkosh All-Stars

Byron O. Bell Jr. (June 9, 1914 – October 18, 2008) was an American professional basketball player. He played for the Oshkosh All-Stars in the National Basketball League for one game during the 1938–39 season and scored four points.
