= Pete Hecomovich =

American basketball and football player (1918–1993)

Personal information
- Born: June 13, 1918 Taconite, Minnesota, U.S.
- Died: May 21, 1993 (aged 74) Marble, Minnesota, U.S.
- Listed height: 6 ft 4 in (1.93 m)
- Listed weight: 205 lb (93 kg)

Career information
- College: Idaho (1941–1943)
- Position: Guard

Career history
- 1940: Oshkosh All-Stars

Peter Anthony Hecomovich (June 13, 1918 – May 21, 1993) was an American multi-sport athlete in football and basketball. In basketball, he played in the National Basketball League for the Oshkosh All-Stars in one game during the 1940–41 season.

In football, Hecomovich was the starting quarterback at the University of Idaho in the Pacific Coast Conference (PCC). Selected in the thirtieth round (284th overall) of the 1943 NFL draft, he did not play in the NFL.
