= Jim Currie (basketball) =

American basketball player (1916–1987)

Personal information
- Born: December 15, 1916 Cook County, Illinois, U.S.
- Died: November 16, 1987 (aged 70) Sisters, Oregon, U.S.
- Listed height: 6 ft 2 in (1.88 m)
- Listed weight: 185 lb (84 kg)

Career information
- High school: Evanston Township (Evanston, Illinois)
- College: Northwestern (1936–1939)
- Position: Shooting guard / small forward

Career history
- 1939–1940: Hammond Ciesar All-Americans

James Alexander Currie (December 15, 1916 – November 16, 1987) was an American professional basketball player. He played in the National Basketball League for the Hammond Ciesar All-Americans in 1939–40 and averaged 3.9 points per game.
