= Pete Preboske =

American basketball player

Personal information
- Born: January 21, 1914 Antigo, Wisconsin, U.S.
- Died: February 22, 1994 (aged 80) Merrill, Wisconsin, U.S.
- Listed height: 6 ft 1 in (1.85 m)
- Listed weight: 195 lb (88 kg)

Career information
- High school: Antigo (Antigo, Wisconsin)
- College: Wisconsin (1933–1935)
- Playing career: 1935–1940
- Position: Forward

Career history

Playing
- 1935–1939: Oshkosh All-Stars
- 1939–1940: Akron Goodyear
- 1939–1940: Thorp Gamble All-Stars

Coaching
- 1939–1940: Thorp HS

Felix Francis "Pete" Preboske (January 21, 1914 – February 22, 1994) was an American professional basketball player. He played for the Oshkosh All-Stars in the National Basketball League between 1935 and 1937 and averaged 6.6 points per game.

Some sources list his last name as "Preboski" but online birth records show that a Felix "Preboske" was born in Antigo, Wisconsin on January 21, 1914.
