= George Hotchkiss =

American basketball coach (1906–1989)

Personal information
- Born: July 1, 1906 Oshkosh, Wisconsin, U.S.
- Died: December 25, 1989 (aged 83) Oshkosh, Wisconsin, U.S.

Career information
- High school: Oshkosh (Oshkosh, Wisconsin)
- College: Wisconsin (1924–1928)
- Position: Guard

Career history

Playing
- 1926–1936: Oshkosh All-Stars

Coaching
- 1936–1941: Oshkosh All-Stars

Career highlights
- As player: Second-team All-Big Ten (1928); As coach: NBL champion (1941); NBL Coach of the Year (1941); 4× NBL division champion (1938–1941)

George Henry Hotchkiss (July 1, 1906 – December 25, 1989) was an American professional basketball coach for the Oshkosh All-Stars in the United States' National Basketball League (NBL). He was the NBL Coach of the Year in 1940–41. During Hotchkiss' tenure, the All-Stars transitioned from being a barnstorming team in 1936–37 to a perennial NBL powerhouse, winning four straight regular season division or league titles from 1938 to 1941, made four straight NBL championship series appearances in that span, and won the league championship in 1941. He stepped down as coach after that season.

As a player, Hotchkiss played football and basketball for the University of Wisconsin in the 1920s. In basketball, he was named to the All-Big Ten Conference second-team as a senior in 1927–28. He then played for the Oshkosh All-Stars prior to the formation of the NBL in 1937–38.

In his post-basketball career, Hotchkiss was a self-employed insurance agent for Northwestern Mutual.

== Head coaching record ==
The below season records reflect Hotchkiss' tenure as head coach when the Oshkosh All-Stars were in the NBL. In 1936–37 they were still a barnstorming team and that season is not counted toward official NBL coaching records.

Legend
Regular season	G	Games coached	W	Games won	L	Games lost	W–L %	Win–loss %
Playoffs	PG	Playoff games	PW	Playoff wins	PL	Playoff losses	PW–L %	Playoff win–loss %

Team	Year	G	W	L	W–L%	Finish	PG	PW	PL	PW–L%	Result
Oshkosh	1937–38	14	12	2	.857	1st in Western	5	3	2	.600	Lost in NBL Finals
Oshkosh	1938–30	28	17	11	.607	1st in Western	5	2	3	.400	Lost in NBL Finals
Oshkosh	1939–40	28	15	13	.536	T–1st in Western	8	4	4	.500	Lost in NBL Finals
Oshkosh	1940–41	24	18	6	.750	1st	5	5	0	1.000	Won NBL Championship
Total		94	62	32	.660		23	14	9	.609	
