= Adam Filipczak =

American basketball player (1915–1992)

Personal information
- Born: February 12, 1915 Michigan, U.S.
- Died: July 4, 1992 (aged 77) Michigan, U.S.
- Listed height: 5 ft 10 in (1.78 m)
- Listed weight: 170 lb (77 kg)

Career information
- High school: Northeastern (Detroit, Michigan)
- Position: Guard

Career history
- 1934–1935: Detroit Jaglowicz Aces
- 1935–1937: Detroit Sweitzer Creamery
- 1937–1938: Detroit Davis
- 1938–1939: Detroit Coopers
- 1939–1940: Briggs Beautywares
- 1939–1940: East Side Sports
- 1940: Detroit Eagles

Adam Joseph Filipczak (February 12, 1915 – July 4, 1992), known as Flip Filipczak, was an American professional basketball player. He played in the National Basketball League for the Detroit Eagles in two games during the 1940–41 season.

Filipczak attended Northeastern High School in Detroit. There, he was recognised as a star basketball player and was twice selected to the all-city team. He also played football and baseball at school, being awarded letters in all three sports.

After leaving school, Filipczak worked for Ford Motor Company while continuing to play several sports competitively at an amateur level. He had played basketball semi-professionally for seven years before being signed by the Detroit Eagles in 1940.
