= 1941 World Professional Basketball Tournament =

World Professional Basketball Tournament
- 1941

Tournament information
- Location: Chicago, Illinois
- Dates: 15 March–19 March
- Venue: International Amphitheater
- Teams: 16

Final positions
- Champions: Detroit Eagles
- 1st runner-up: Oshkosh All-Stars
- 2nd runner-up: New York Renaissance

Tournament statistics
- MVP: Buddy Jeannette
- Top scorer: Chuck Chuckovits

The 1941 World Professional Basketball Tournament was the third edition of the World Professional Basketball Tournament. It was held in Chicago, Illinois, during the days of 15–19 March 1941 and featured 16 teams, with the teams mostly independently run teams (including the Indianapolis Kautskys who left the NBL this season before later returning to the NBL the following season afterward and both the Fort Wayne Zollner Pistons and Rochester Seagrams, who held roots to the modern-day Detroit Pistons and Sacramento Kings NBA teams) who also competed alongside four teams in the National Basketball League (including the league champion Oshkosh All-Stars) and the American Basketball League champion Philadelphia Sphas. Entering the tournament, the Oshkosh All-Stars of the NBL were considered heavy favorites to win the entire event after winning their first NBL championship; they managed to reach the WPBT championship match after beating the Fort Wayne Zollner Pistons, Philadelphia Sphas, and Toledo White Huts throughout the tournament. Meanwhile, the other team in the championship round, the NBL's Detroit Eagles, had them go all the way by beating the Indianapolis Kautskys 58–43 before beating the defending champion Harlem Globetrotters and New York Renaissance by one point each in their respective matches, thus guaranteeing an NBL team would win the WPBT for the first time. This year's event was won by the Detroit Eagles, who upset the NBL champion Oshkosh All-Stars 39–37 in the WPBT championship game. The New York Renaissance came in third after beating the Toledo White Huts 57–42 in the third-place game. Buddy Jeannette of the Detroit Eagles was named the tournament's Most Valuable Player.

== Results ==
=== Bracket ===
Round 1
Fort Wayne Zollner Pistons	41
Oshkosh All-Stars	47
Philadelphia Sphas	48
Bismark Phantoms	30
Toledo White Huts	36
Sheboygan Red Skins	28
Chicago Bruins	53
Davenport Central Turner Rockets	17
Detroit Eagles	58
Indianapolis Kautskys	43
Harlem Globetrotters	38
Newark Elks	29
New York Renaissance	43
Dayton Sucher Wonders	20
Kenosha Royals	40
Rochester Seagrams	36

Quarterfinals
Oshkosh All-Stars	38
Philadelphia Sphas	31
Toledo White Huts	43
Chicago Bruins	33
Detroit Eagles	37
Harlem Globetrotters	36
New York Renaissance	43
Kenosha Royals	15

Semifinals
Oshkosh All-Stars	40
Toledo White Huts	37
Detroit Eagles	43
New York Renaissance	42

Final
Oshkosh All-Stars	37
Detroit Eagles	39
Third place
Toledo White Huts	42
New York Renaissance	57

=== First round ===
==== Chicago v Davenport ====
15 March 1941
8:00 p.m.

Box score and recap

Chicago Bruins 53, Davenport Central Turner Rockets 17
Scoring by half: 25–4, 28–13
Pts: S. Szukala, G. Hogan – 10	Pts: S. Gamber – 8

International Amphitheater
Attendance: 10,000
Referees: Hooker, Russell

==== Detroit v Indianapolis ====
15 March 1941

Detroit Eagles 58, Indianapolis Kautskys 43
Pts: E. Sadowski, B. Calihan – 19	Pts: B. Towery – 11

International Amphitheater
Referees: Kriznecky, Kuzma

==== Harlem v Newark ====
15 March 1941

Harlem Globetrotters 38, Newark Elks 29
Pts: S. Boswell – 11	Pts: E. Sonderman – 10

International Amphitheater
Referees: Messinger, Enright

==== Oshkosh v Fort Wayne ====
16 March 1941

Oshkosh All-Stars 47, Fort Wayne Zollner Pistons 41
Scoring by quarter: 11–3, 6–11, 24–9, 6–18
Pts: S. Putnam – 13	Pts: J. Keller – 15

International Amphitheater
Referees: Nat Messinger, Dutch Kriznecky

==== New York v Dayton ====
16 March 1941

New York Renaissance 43, Dayton Sucher Wonders 20

International Amphitheater

==== Kenosha v Rochester ====
16 March 1941

Kenosha Royals 40, Rochester Seagrams 36
Pts: K. Binder – 15	Pts: A. Cerir – 14

International Amphitheater
Referees: Kennedy, Hooker

==== Toledo v Sheboygan ====
16 March 1941

Toledo White Huts 36, Sheboygan Red Skins 28
Scoring by quarter: 9–5, 11–10, 9–6, 7–7
Pts: C. Chuckovits – 21	Pts: O. Kolar, P. Sokody – 8

International Amphitheater

==== Philadelphia v Bismark ====
16 March 1941

Philadelphia Sphas 48, Bismark Phantoms 30

International Amphitheater

=== Quarter-finals ===
==== Detroit v Harlem ====
16 March 1941

Detroit Eagles 37, Harlem Globetrotters 36

International Amphitheater

==== Toledo v Chicago ====
17 March 1941

Toledo White Huts 43, Chicago Bruins 33

International Amphitheater
Referees: 9,500

==== New York v Kenosha ====
17 March 1941

Box score and recap

New York Renaissance 43, Kenosha Royals 15
Scoring by quarter: 10–6, 20–6, 11–2, 2–1
Pts: D. King – 14	Pts: B. Monteen – 4

International Amphitheater
Referees: Pat Kennedy, John Russell

==== Oshkosh v Philadelphia ====
17 March 1941

Box score and recap

Oshkosh All-Stars 38, Philadelphia Sphas 31
Scoring by quarter: 11–12, 9–9, 11–8, 7–2
Pts: L. Edwards – 12	Pts: I. Lautman, P. Rosenberg – 8

International Amphitheater
Attendance: 10,000
Referees: Pat Kennedy, Dutch Kriznecky

=== Semi-finals ===
==== Oshkosh v Toledo ====
18 March 1941
8:30 p.m.

Box score and recap

Oshkosh All-Stars 40, Toledo White Huts 37
Scoring by quarter: 8–12, 8–4, 12–12, 12–9
Pts: B. Carpenter – 18	Pts: C. Chuckovits – 16

International Amphitheater
Attendance: 13,000
Referees: Dick Kuzma, Frank "Dutch" Kriznecky

==== Detroit v New York ====
18 March 1941
9:30 p.m.

Detroit Eagles 43, New York Renaissance 42

International Amphitheater

=== Third place game ===
19 March 1942
8:30 p.m.

Box score and recap

New York Renaissance 57, Toledo White Huts 42
Scoring by quarter: 10–11, 18–10, 18–5, 11–16
Pts: D. King – 23	Pts: C. Chuckovits – 23

International Amphitheater
Attendance: 12,000
Referees: Jim Enright, Elmer Hooker

=== Championship game ===
19 March 1942
9:30 p.m.

Box score and recap

Detroit Eagles 39, Oshkosh All-Stars 37
Scoring by quarter: 14–6, 12–10, 9–7, 4–14
Pts: E. Sadowski – 11	Pts: B. Carpenter – 8

International Amphitheater
Attendance: 12,000
Referees: Nat Messinger, Frank Kriznecky

== Individual awards ==
- Chuck Chuckovits of the Toledo White Huts led this tournament in scoring with 83 points scored in four games played.

=== All-Tournament Team ===
- F – Chuck Chuckovits, Toledo White Huts
- F – Dolly King, New York Renaissance
- C – Ed Sadowski, Detroit Eagles
- G – Bob Carpenter, Oshkosh All-Stars
- G – Buddy Jeannette, Detroit Eagles (MVP)

== See also ==
- 1940–41 National Basketball League (United States) season, a professional basketball season featuring four of the competing teams there, including the NBL champion Oshkosh All-Stars and WPBT champion Detroit Eagles
- 1940–41 Philadelphia Sphas season, a professional basketball season involving the revived version of the original American Basketball League's defending champions in the Philadelphia Sphas, who were considered a legendary Jewish team in their own rights
