= Ben Stephens (basketball) =

American basketball player

Personal information
- Born: November 27, 1916
- Died: April 6, 1966 (aged 49) St. Thomas, Virgin Islands
- Listed height: 6 ft 0 in (1.83 m)
- Listed weight: 175 lb (79 kg)

Career information
- College: Iowa (1936–1939)
- Playing career: 1936–1939
- Position: Guard / forward

Career history
- 1939–1942: Akron Wingfoots

Career highlights
- 3× All-NBL First Team (1940–1942); NBL Most Valuable Player (1941); NBL Rookie of the Year (1940); NBL scoring champion (1941); NBL All-Time Team

Benjamin M. Stephens (November 27, 1916 - April 6, 1966) was an American professional basketball player.

A 6'0" guard/forward from the University of Iowa, Stephens played three seasons (1939–1942) in the National Basketball League as a member of the Akron Wingfoots. He led the league in scoring during the 1940–41 season with an 11.0 points per game average. His basketball career was interrupted by World War II, during which he served in the United States Navy. After the war, Stephens worked for Goodyear Tire and Rubber Company before dying of a heart attack while on vacation in the U.S. Virgin Islands in 1966.
