= Herb Ball =

American basketball player

Personal information
- Born: July 27, 1918 Chicago, Illinois
- Died: April 18, 2000 (aged 81) Titusville, Florida
- Listed height: 6 ft 2 in (1.88 m)
- Listed weight: 195 lb (88 kg)

Career information
- High school: Lindblom (Chicago, Illinois)
- College: Kennedy–King (1935–1937); Western Kentucky (1938–1940)
- Position: Guard / forward

Career history
- 1940–1941: Pottstown All-Americans
- 1941: Chicago Bruins
- 1943–1944: Chicago American Gears

Herbert Edward Ball (July 27, 1918 – April 18, 2000) was an American professional basketball player. He played for the Chicago Bruins in the National Basketball League for six games during the 1940–41 season and averaged 0.5 points per game.
