= Willie Phillips (basketball) =

American basketball player

Personal information
- Born: c. 1915
- Listed height: 5 ft 8 in (1.73 m)
- Listed weight: 175 lb (79 kg)

Career information
- College: DePaul (1934–1937)
- Playing career: 1937–1944
- Position: Shooting guard / small forward

Career history

Playing
- 1937–1938: Chicago Demons
- 1938–1939: Chicago Harmons
- 1939–1940: Chicago Bruins
- 1943–1944: Detroit Eagles

Coaching
- 1937–1938: Catholic Central HS

Willie Phillips (born c. 1915) was an American professional basketball player. He played for the Chicago Bruins in the National Basketball League during the 1939–40 season and averaged 1.8 points per game. He played college basketball and football at DePaul University in the 1930s.
