= Scoop Putnam =

American basketball player (1912–1996)

Personal information
- Born: September 8, 1912 Greenville, South Carolina, U.S.
- Died: June 8, 1996 (aged 83) Los Angeles, California, U.S.
- Listed height: 6 ft 0 in (1.83 m)
- Listed weight: 175 lb (79 kg)

Career information
- High school: Parker (Spartanburg, South Carolina)
- College: Tennessee (1936–1939)
- Position: Shooting guard / small forward

Career history
- 1939–1941: Oshkosh All-Stars
- 1941–1942: Toledo Jim White Chevrolets
- 1942: Clintonville Truckers

Career highlights
- NBL champion (1941); 2× Second-team all-SEC (1937, 1938)

Wilton "Scoop" Putnam (September 8, 1912 – June 8, 1996) was an American professional basketball player. He played in the National Basketball League for the Oshkosh All-Stars and Toledo Jim White Chevrolets and averaged 3.9 points per game for his career.
