= Elmer Johnson (basketball) =

American basketball player

Personal information
- Born: January 23, 1910
- Died: July 7, 1988 (aged 78) River Grove, Illinois, U.S.
- Listed height: 6 ft 3 in (1.91 m)
- Listed weight: 185 lb (84 kg)

Career information
- High school: East Leyden (Franklin Park, Illinois)
- College: Northwestern (1930–1933)
- Position: Forward / center

Career history
- 1933–1935: Chicago Lifschultz Fast Freighters
- 1934–1935: Crookston Gunners
- 1934–1935: Oshkosh All-Stars
- 1937–1938: House of David
- 1939–1941: Chicago Bruins

Elmer C. Johnson (January 23, 1910 – July 7, 1988) was an American professional basketball player and minor league baseball player. He played for the Chicago Bruins in the National Basketball League from 1939 to 1941 and averaged 2.8 points per game.

In baseball, Johnson played for seven different teams between 1934 and 1940. He was a relief pitcher.
