= NBL (United States) Most Valuable Player Award =

National Basketball League award

The National Basketball League Most Valuable Player Award (MVP) was an annual National Basketball League (NBL) award given to the best performing player of the regular season in each of the twelve years the league existed. The MVP was selected by sports writers, broadcasters, coaches, and managers. For most of the NBL's existence, despite the large amount of players and teams alike that played in the league throughout its existence, only two players won the vast majority (66.7%) of the NBL's MVP awards while the NBL existed: Leroy Edwards of the Oshkosh All-Stars from 1938–1940 and Bobby McDermott of the Fort Wayne Zollner Pistons from 1942–1946. The only other players to win the MVP award even just once for the NBL were Ben Stephens of the Akron Goodyear Wingfoots, Bob Davies of the Rochester Royals, George Mikan of the Minneapolis Lakers, and Don Otten of the Tri-Cities Blackhawks.

As of 2026, among the winners were three future Basketball Hall of Famers: Bob Davies (1970), Bobby McDermott (1988), and George Mikan (1950).

== Winners ==
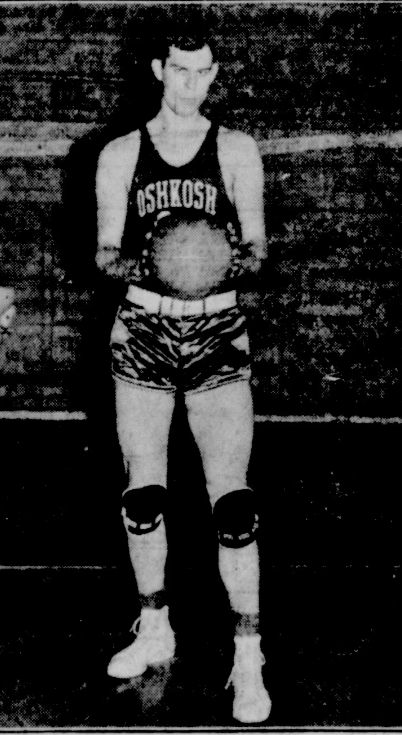
Leroy Edwards, Oshkosh All-Stars, 1938 through 1940

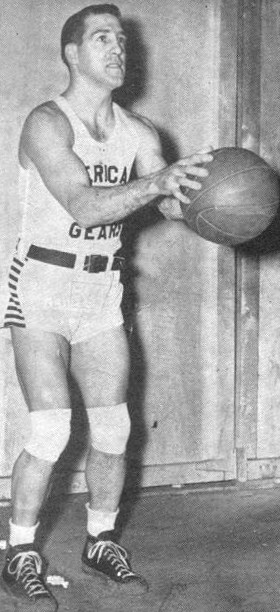
Bobby McDermott, Fort Wayne Zollner Pistons, 1942 through 1946

*	Inducted into the Naismith Memorial Basketball Hall of Fame
†	Denotes player whose team won championship that year
Player (X)	Denotes the number of times the player had been named MVP at that time
Team (X)	Denotes the number of times a player from this team had won at that time

Season	Player	Position	Team	Reference
1937–38	Leroy Edwards	Center	Oshkosh All-Stars	
1938–39	Leroy Edwards (2)	Center	Oshkosh All-Stars (2)	
1939–40	Leroy Edwards (3)	Center	Oshkosh All-Stars (3)	
1940–41	Ben Stephens	Guard / forward	Akron Goodyear Wingfoots	
1941–42	Bobby McDermott*	Guard	Fort Wayne Zollner Pistons	
1942–43	Bobby McDermott* (2)	Guard	Fort Wayne Zollner Pistons (2)	
1943–44†	Bobby McDermott* (3)	Guard	Fort Wayne Zollner Pistons (3)	
1944–45†	Bobby McDermott* (4)	Guard	Fort Wayne Zollner Pistons (4)	
1945–46	Bobby McDermott* (5)	Guard	Fort Wayne Zollner Pistons (5)	
1946–47	Bob Davies*	Guard	Rochester Royals	
1947–48†	George Mikan*	Center	Minneapolis Lakers	
1948–49	Don Otten	Center	Tri-Cities Blackhawks	

== See also ==
- NBA Most Valuable Player
