= Chuck Chuckovits =

American basketball player (1912–1991)

Personal information
- Born: July 10, 1912 Akron, Ohio, U.S.
- Died: August 12, 1991 (aged 79) Sylvania, Ohio, U.S.
- Listed height: 6 ft 1 in (1.85 m)
- Listed weight: 175 lb (79 kg)

Career information
- High school: St. Vincent (Akron, Ohio)
- College: Toledo (1936–1939)
- Playing career: 1939–1946
- Position: Forward / guard

Career history
- 1939–1940: Hammond Ciesar All-Americans
- 1940–1941: Toledo White Huts
- 1941–1942: Toledo Jim White Chevrolets
- 1942–1943: Detroit Eagles
- 1945–1946: Toledo White Huts
- 1946: Toledo Pros

Career highlights
- NBL All-Time Team; All-NBL First Team (1942); NBL scoring champion (1942); Second-team All-American – Converse, NEA (1938); Second-team All-American – MSG (1939)

Charles H. Chuckovitz (July 10, 1912 – August 12, 1991) was an American professional basketball player in the 1930s and 1940s.

A 6'1" guard-forward who starred at St. Vincent High School, he became an All-American at the University of Toledo. He broke Ohio's single-season and career collegiate scoring marks, both previously held by Wooster star Nick Frascella. He also set a three-year intercollegiate scoring record with 1,149 points.

Chuckovitz played two seasons in the National Basketball League as a member of the Hammond Ciesar All-Americans and the Toledo Jim White Chevrolets. He received all-league honors with Toledo during the 1941–42 season after leading the NBL with an 18.5 points per game average, which was a new single-season record. He was also the top scorer at the 1941 World Professional Basketball Tournament held in Chicago, recording a tournament-record 82 points in four games while leading Toledo to a fourth-place finish.

Chuckovitz coached high school basketball, including stints at Holland High School and Waite High School.
