= George Hogan (basketball) =

American basketball player

Personal information
- Born: April 12, 1915 Chicago, Illinois
- Died: January 19, 1965 (aged 49) Chicago, Illinois
- Listed height: 6 ft 1 in (1.85 m)
- Listed weight: 170 lb (77 kg)

Career information
- College: Loyola Chicago (1936–1939)
- Playing career: 1939–1946
- Position: Guard / forward

Career history
- 1939: Hammond Ciesar All-Americans
- 1939–1942: Chicago Bruins
- 1942–1943: Chicago Ramblers
- 1945–1946: Chicago American Gears

George Francis Hogan (April 12, 1915 – January 19, 1965) was an American professional basketball player. He played in the National Basketball League for the Hammond Ciesar All-Americans, Chicago Bruins, and Chicago American Gears. He averaged 3.1 points per game for his career.
