= Frank Linskey =

American basketball player and coach

Personal information
- Born: August 18, 1913 Braidwood, Illinois, U.S.
- Died: July 3, 1999 (aged 85) Southfield, Michigan, U.S.
- Listed height: 6 ft 2 in (1.88 m)
- Listed weight: 180 lb (82 kg)

Career information
- High school: St. Philip (Chicago, Illinois)
- College: DePaul (1933–1935)
- Playing career: 1935–1941
- Position: Guard
- Coaching career: 1940–1941

Career history

Playing
- 1935–1937: Cicero Elks
- 1937–1939: Oshkosh All-Stars
- 1939–1941: Chicago Bruins

Coaching
- 1940–1941: Chicago Bruins

Frank E. Linskey (August 18, 1913 – July 3, 1999) was an American professional basketball player and coach. He played for the Oshkosh All-Stars and Chicago Bruins in the National Basketball League and averaged 2.9 points per game. He served as a player-coach for the Bruins during the 1940–41 season where the team finished with 11 wins and 13 losses.

Linskey worked for Sears after his basketball career, retiring and moving to Florida in 1974. He eventually moved to Southfield, Michigan.
