= Hammond Ciesar All-Americans =

- Leagues: National Basketball League
- Founded: 1936
- Dissolved: 1941
- Location: Hammond, Indiana

The Hammond Ciesar All-Americans were a professional basketball team that competed in the National Basketball League. They were based in Hammond, Indiana, and played in the Hammond Civic Center for home games.

== History ==
The team was founded in 1936 by car dealer Eddie Ciesar in Whiting, Indiana as the Whiting Ciesar All-Americans, where they played in the Midwest Basketball Conference. Following their first season of professional play, the Midwest Basketball Conference would rebrand itself into the National Basketball League. During the first official season of the NBL, the Ciesar All-Americans would have their best season in the franchise's history with a 12–3 second-place finish in the Western Division (being one extra loss behind the Oshkosh All-Stars for first place there), with them being swept by Oshkosh in the Western Division Playoff. Following the conclusion of the NBL's first season under that name, the Ciesar All-Americans changed their team name for the 1938–39 season to the Hammond Ciesar All-Americans, which they would go by for the rest of their existence moving forward. During their early seasons in the NBL, the All-Americans would be best known for having future Basketball Hall of Famer and legendary UCLA Bruins head coach John Wooden playing for the franchise before financial issues forced Wooden to leave the All-Americans franchise for one last return to the Indianapolis Kautskys. The Hammond Ciesar All-Americans ended up disbanded after the 1940–41 season due to greater financial issues involving the team's final seasons in the NBL.

== Season-by-season records ==
Note: W = wins, L = losses, % = win–loss %

| Season | W | L | % | Playoffs | Results |
Whiting Ciesar All-Americans (MBC)
| 1936–37 | 3 | 5 | 0.375 | | |
Whiting Ciesar All-Americans (NBL)
| 1937–38 | 12 | 3 | 0.800 | 0–2 | Lost Western Division Playoff (Finals) to Oshkosh |
Hammond Ciesar All-Americans (NBL)
| 1938–39 | 4 | 24 | 0.143 | | |
| 1939–40 | 9 | 19 | 0.321 | | |
| 1940–41 | 6 | 18 | 0.250 | | |
