= 1941–42 Toledo Jim White Chevrolets season =

NBL professional basketball team season

- Head coach: Tommy Edwards (player-coach); Sidney Goldberg (1942 WPBT)
- Owner(s): Jim White (majority); Sidney Goldberg (minority)
- Arena: The Field House

Results
- Record: 3–21 (.125)
- Place: Division: 7th
- Playoff finish: Did not qualify

The 1941–42 Toledo Jim White Chevrolets season was the first and only full season of the Toledo Jim White Chevrolets playing in the United States' National Basketball League (NBL), which would also be the fifth year the NBL itself existed. However, if you include their previous season of existence as the Toledo White Huts, as noted by their appearance in the 1941 World Professional Basketball Tournament, this would actually be their second season of play instead. Following that WPBT note, the owner and head coach of the White Huts franchise, Sidney Goldberg, paid a fee of $350 to have his team join the NBL, but a surprise extra fee of $1,500 in case of forfeiture later led to car dealership salesman Jim White (who was operating with selling Chevrolet vehicles to people at the time) coming in to help out Goldberg's franchise, which led to Jim White becoming a majority owner of the team in the NBL and Goldberg renaming the White Huts team to the Jim White Chevrolets for NBL games (with the condition that the Toledo White Huts retained their original, proper name that was given to them from the White Hut hamburger chain for non-NBL games played, such as exhibition matches, charity games, or even for the 1942 World Professional Basketball Tournament). Ironically enough, the Jim White Chevrolets would deal with forfeits during this season, both by being on the dealing end (on December 10, 1941) and being on the receiving end (on December 22, 1941) of such forfeitures in what were supposed to be planned matches against the same team, funnily enough, with the Chicago Bruins. Not only that, but Toledo would win the only NBL scheduled game on the day of the Attack on Pearl Harbor on December 7, 1941, with a 42–40 home victory over the Indianapolis Kautskys. In spite of the rare positives they had (which included a surprising 3–1 start to their season), their first and only full season of play in the NBL would prove to be a very poor season for them, as they would only win two total matches of play outside of that one forfeited match they won over the Chicago Bruins (including their close 42–40 win on the day Pearl Harbor was attacked, their only other home win was a week later on December 14 with a 41–34 win over the Sheboygan Red Skins) and have 21 losses (with most of them being in a 20-game losing streak, starting with their forfeit to Chicago), leading to them finishing in last place through the entire seven team league. This would lead to the Jim White Chevrolets being considered one of the worst teams in NBL history in terms of overall records.

Despite that notion, this season would also be notable for having this team be considered the first professional basketball team to be racially integrated due to minority owner and head coach Sidney Goldberg suggesting that teams like his allow for racial integration to occur since World War II was cutting into the talent pool of teams like Toledo's during this season. With that suggestion in mind and later approved by the higher-ups in the NBL, the Toledo Jim White Chevrolets not only became the first NBL team to allow for racially integrated teams to occur in the league, but they were also the first team in the NBL to have a mostly black roster in the process with ten black players being on their roster at one point in time (with most of them being local Toledo players that also had a presence playing for all-black barnstorming teams in the past like the Harlem Globetrotters and the New York Renaissance), which was the most black players any professional basketball team had on a roster at once until 1972 when a significant number of both NBA and ABA teams had utilized at least eleven black players on their rosters by then (though they would surprisingly never utilize an all-black starting line-up during the season when they had the chance to do so). Not only that, but they also had one of the first Latin American professional basketball players to play in the league as well, with Al Alvarez being born in Argentina and playing for Toledo for a few games this season. Despite their more progressive views of operation in mind at the time, however, the Jim White Chevrolets would end up being the worst team that season with two games won (both at home) without the need of a forfeit by the Chicago Bruins (with that forfeited game being the third and final victory in question, all occurring in the month of December 1941), while losing 21 total games (including all 16 of their road games and a game they forfeited to the Chicago Bruins themselves, funnily enough) to get one of the worst records ever held in NBL history, with their home venue utilizing slippery terrazzo for the basketball court instead of wood flooring. Not only that, but if you include the four games they played and lost in their following season before folding operations (and don't include the idea of the Toledo Jeeps being a continuation of the original Toledo NBL franchise), the Jim White Chevrolets could have made a case as the worst NBL franchise in the league's entire history with two victories in this season of play (excluding one over the Chicago Bruins by forfeit when Toledo also forfeited a match to Chicago themselves in the same month) over a longer, more regulated period of time.

This season would also be notable for Chuck Chuckovits being a member of the All-NBL First Team in spite of the team's poor record this season due to him being the leading scorer of the entire NBL this season.

== Roster ==
Please note that due to the way records for professional basketball leagues like the NBL and the ABL were recorded at the time, some information on both teams and players may be harder to list out than usual here.

Player	Position
Armando "Al" Alvarez	G
Shannie Barnett	F-C
Bill Brownell	C
Soup Cable	G
Chuck Chuckovits	G-F
Gran Edwards	F
Tommy Edwards	G-F
Don Elser	F-C
Ed Erban	F-C
Bob Hassmiller	G
Pat Hintz	G
George Nelmark	G
Paul Nowak	C
Jack Ozburn	G-F
Pete Pederson	F-C
Scoop Putnam	G-F
Jim Rae	C
Glenn Roberts	F-C
Bennie Schall	G-F
Bill Thompson	G-F
Paul Wallace	G
Dave Williams	C
Tom Wukovits	G
Abe Yourist	F-C

== Regular season ==
=== Season standings ===
Pos.	League Standings	Wins	Losses	Win %
1	Oshkosh All-Stars	20	4	.833
T–2	Fort Wayne Zollner Pistons	15	9	.625
T–2	Akron Goodyear Wingfoots	15	9	.625
4	Indianapolis Kautskys	12	11	.522
5	Sheboygan Red Skins	10	14	.417
6	Chicago Bruins	8	15	.348
7	Toledo Jim White Chevrolets	3	21	.125

=== NBL Schedule ===
- November 30, 1941 @ Indianapolis, IN: Toledo Jim White Chevrolets 37, Indianapolis Kautskys 51
- December 7, 1941 @ Toledo, OH: Indianapolis Kautskys 40, Toledo Jim White Chevrolets 42
- December 10, 1941 @ Toledo, OH: The Toledo Jim White Chevrolets would win their home match over the Chicago Bruins by forfeiture. (As such, 2–0 favoring the Toledo Jim White Chevrolets would be the official recorded score for this match.)
- December 14, 1941 @ Toledo, OH: Sheboygan Red Skins 34, Toledo Jim White Chevrolets 41
- December 22, 1941 @ Chicago, IL: The Chicago Bruins would win their home match over the Toledo Jim White Chevrolets by forfeiture. (As such, 2–0 favoring the Chicago Bruins would be the official recorded score for this match.)
- December 25, 1941 @ Sheboygan, WI: Toledo Jim White Chevrolets 28, Sheboygan Red Skins 42
- December 26, 1941 @ Oshkosh, WI: Toledo Jim White Chevrolets 38, Oshkosh All-Stars 48
- December 28, 1941 @ Toledo, OH: Akron Goodyear Wingfoots 60, Toledo Jim White Chevrolets 38
- December 30, 1941 @ Akron, OH: Toledo Jim White Chevrolets 44, Akron Goodyear Wingfoots 51
- January 2, 1942 @ New Haven, IN: Toledo Jim White Chevrolets 21, Fort Wayne Zollner Pistons 53
- January 7, 1942 @ Toledo, OH: Oshkosh All-Stars 55, Toledo Jim White Chevrolets 47
- January 11, 1942 @ Toledo, OH: Indianapolis Kautskys 38, Toledo Jim White Chevrolets 23
- January 13, 1942 @ Fort Wayne, IN: Toledo Jim White Chevrolets 46, Fort Wayne Zollner Pistons 60
- January 14, 1942 @ Chicago, IL: Toledo Jim White Chevrolets 31, Chicago Bruins 53
- January 21, 1942 @ Akron, OH: Toledo Jim White Chevrolets 37, Akron Goodyear Wingfoots 52
- January 29, 1942 @ Milwaukee, WI: Toledo Jim White Chevrolets 50, Oshkosh All-Stars 55
- February 1, 1942 @ Indianapolis, IN: Toledo Jim White Chevrolets 36, Indianapolis Kautskys 39
- February 4, 1942 @ Toledo, OH: Fort Wayne Zollner Pistons 59, Toledo Jim White Chevrolets 44
- February 11, 1942 @ Huntington, IN: Toledo Jim White Chevrolets 44, Fort Wayne Zollner Pistons 51
- February 12, 1942 @ Sheboygan, WI: Toledo Jim White Chevrolets 38, Sheboygan Red Skins 67
- February 15, 1942 @ Toledo, OH: Chicago Bruins 53, Toledo Jim White Chevrolets 41
- February 19, 1942 @ Sheboygan, WI: Toledo Jim White Chevrolets 41, Sheboygan Red Skins 43
- February 21, 1942 @ Oshkosh, WI: Toledo Jim White Chevrolets 51, Oshkosh All-Stars 66
- February 23, 1942 @ Akron, OH: Toledo Jim White Chevrolets 49, Akron Goodyear Wingfoots 51

== Awards and honors ==
- Chuck Chuckovits – Leading scorer of the NBL, All-NBL First Team, NBL All-Time Team

== World Professional Basketball Tournament ==
After entering the 1941 World Professional Basketball Tournament as the Toledo White Huts (and subsequently making it to the semifinal round there after upsetting both the Sheboygan Red Skins and Chicago Bruins), the Toledo Jim White Chevrolets would return to the 1942 event held in Chicago from March 8–12, 1942 under their original Toledo White Huts name. Unlike previous versions of the WPBT, this version of the WPBT showcased every NBL team outside of the Akron Goodyear Wingfoots (the sole remaining team from nearby Akron, Ohio following the exit of the Akron Firestone Non-Skids) competing against a group that otherwise consisted entirely of independently ran teams like the Toledo franchise used to be for the previous year's event (as well as what the defending WPBT champion Detroit Eagles had become following their upset championship victory over the Oshkosh All-Stars). Incidentally, Toledo's first round opponent for the 1942 event would see them go up against the defending WPBT champions, the Detroit Eagles (who had most of their key players from the previous event returning for this tournament), who actually left the NBL before this season began due to venue issues (since their home venues were in armory military buildings) following increasingly high tensions with the U.S.A. later entering World War II during this season. Unfortunately for the Jim White Chevrolets turned White Huts for this event, the many issues that plagued their squad throughout the entire season would continue to show up for the WPBT as well, as the defending WPBT champion Detroit Eagles would make short work of the Toledo franchise in a blowout 46–29 defeat for the current NBL squad. However, the Toledo franchise would at least see themselves be joined alongside the returning Indianapolis Kautskys and the new Fort Wayne Zollner Pistons franchises as the other NBL teams to be eliminated in the first round of the event. Not only that, but despite folding operations during the following season, the Toledo White Huts would end up returning to action for the 1946 event (with them sometimes being referred to as the Toledo Whites in a shorthanded manner instead of the Toledo White Huts), with that team being able to return to the NBL for the 1946–47 season as the Toledo Jeeps.

=== Game played ===
- Lost first round (29–46) to the Detroit Eagles
