= 1941–42 Indianapolis Kautskys season =

NBL professional basketball team season

- Head coach: Frank Kautsky
- General manager: Frank Kautsky; Abe Goldsmith
- Owner(s): Frank Kautsky; Pete Bailey
- Arena: Butler Fieldhouse

Results
- Record: 12–11 (.522)
- Place: Division: 4th
- Playoff finish: Lost NBL Semifinals to Oshkosh All-Stars, 2–0

The 1941–42 Indianapolis Kautskys season was the fourth professional basketball season of play that the Kautskys franchise would not only utilize that name for their team, but also played in the United States' National Basketball League (NBL), which was also the fifth year the league existed. However, if you include their previous three seasons where they played in predecessor leagues of sorts in the National Professional Basketball League and the Midwest Basketball Conference, as well as the independent seasons they had in their history, then this would actually be their eighth (or ninth) season of play as the Kautskys in the wild history of the NBL. This season would also mark the first time that the Kautskys franchise would return to the NBL as a proper team there after previously leaving the NBL in its previous season in order to experiment on how they'd perform as a barnstorming franchise instead. Entering this season, it marked the second season in a row where the NBL would not utilize the two division format for Eastern Division and Western Division teams due to the precarious balance of teams at hand in the league this season due to not just the Kautskys returning alongside both the independently owned Toledo White Huts (operating as the Toledo Jim White Chevrolets) and Fred Zollner's company owned Fort Wayne Zollner Pistons works team (now known as the Detroit Pistons NBA team) joining the NBL, but also seeing the Detroit Eagles ironically try their own luck at being a barnstorming team themselves following their surprising upset win in the 1941 World Professional Basketball Tournament alongside both the Akron Firestone Non-Skids and the Hammond Ciesar All-Americans deciding to fold operations altogether before this season began taking shape. It also became the only time that the Kautskys would officially play in the NBL without any proper divisions in mind whatsoever.

Entering their first return into the NBL, the Kautskys would start out with a 2–1 record before their December 7, 1941 game on the road against the Toledo Jim White Chevrolets occurred led to an unexpected announcement of the infamous Attack on Pearl Harbor occurring (which subsequently led to Toledo winning the first of what would be their only three games ever won in their history within the NBL with a 46–48 defeat for Indianapolis). Despite this ignominious early moment within the Kautskys' season that would be attached to a time that subsequently led to the United States of America entering World War II not long afterward, Indianapolis would still battle as hard as they could throughout the rest of the season (which included a weird doubleheader series against two different teams (both being in Wisconsin) in one day) to barely obtain an above-average record of 12–11 to finish their first returning season into the NBL (a 24th game they had scheduled by the end of the season on February 25, 1942, against the Chicago Bruins at home was ultimately cancelled due to it not affecting either team's playoff chances or standings one way or the other). This kind of barely above-average finish would allow the Kautskys to finish in fourth place in the NBL (ahead of the new Toledo Jim White Chevrolets, Chicago Bruins, and Sheboygan Red Skins, but behind the tied placements of the Akron Goodyear Wingfoots and new Fort Wayne Zollner Pistons alongside the defending champion Oshkosh All-Stars), though for this year's NBL Playoffs, their fourth-place finish meant that the Kautskys would have them competing against the defending champion Oshkosh All-Stars in the semifinal round instead of either the Akron Goodyear Wingfoots or Fort Wayne Zollner Pistons. While Indianapolis would keep things close with their first ever NBL Playoff match, they would ultimately be blown out by their second match to be swept 2–0 to the eventual repeating champions of the NBL. After also competing in the 1942 World Professional Basketball Tournament alongside the majority of the other NBL teams around, the Kautskys would decide to not continue competing in the NBL until World War II was effectively over (which would not take effect until the 1945–46 NBL season), meaning that the Kautskys would effectively go on a competitive hiatus until then (though it's slated in some of the upcoming World Professional Basketball Tournaments held afterward that the team would still compete under the monikers of the Indianapolis Pure Oils and Indianapolis Oilers instead).

== Roster ==
Please note that due to the way records for professional basketball leagues like the NBL and the ABL were recorded at the time, some information on both teams and players may be harder to list out than usual here.

1941–42 Indianapolis Kautskys roster
Players

| Pos. | No. | Player | Height | Weight | DOB | From |
|---|---|---|---|---|---|---|
| F/C | | Scott Armstrong | 6 ft 4 in (1.93 m) | 190 lb (86 kg) | 1913–10–12 | Butler |
| G/F | | Frank Baird | 5 ft 11 in (1.80 m) | 160 lb (73 kg) | 1912–04–10 | Butler |
| G | | Hugh Carter | 6 ft 0 in (1.83 m) | | 1922? | Unknown |
| F | | Don Cleary | 6 ft 2 in (1.88 m) | | 1922–07–30 | Unknown |
| G/F | | Bob Dietz | 6 ft 1 in (1.85 m) | 164 lb (74 kg) | 1917–12–04 | Butler |
| G | | Bob Dro | 6 ft 0 in (1.83 m) | 190 lb (86 kg) | 1918–10–12 | Indiana |
| F/C | | Mark Ertel | 6 ft 4 in (1.93 m) | 196 lb (89 kg) | 1919–02–26 | Notre Dame |
| G/F | | Woody Norris | 6 ft 1 in (1.85 m) | 170 lb (77 kg) | 1919–06–18 | Butler |
| G | | Eddie Sadowski | 5 ft 10 in (1.78 m) | 175 lb (79 kg) | 1915–02–02 | Notre Dame |
| G/F | | John Sines | 6 ft 1 in (1.85 m) | 190 lb (86 kg) | 1914–08–13 | Purdue |
| F/C | | John Townsend | 6 ft 4 in (1.93 m) | 208 lb (94 kg) | 1916–09–20 | Michigan |
| G/F | | Jewell Young | 6 ft 0 in (1.83 m) | 160 lb (73 kg) | 1913–01–18 | Purdue |

Coaches
Head coach
- Frank Kautsky

Legend
- (DP) Unsigned draft pick
- (FA) Free agent
- (S) Suspended
- Injured

Roster

Note: Hugh Carter and Don Cleary would only appear on the team's playoff roster and in the 1942 World Professional Basketball Tournament, with them replacing Bob Dro and John Sines respectively during that period of time.

== Regular season ==
=== Season standings ===
| Pos. | League Standings | Wins | Losses | Win % |
|---|---|---|---|---|
| 1 | Oshkosh All-Stars | 20 | 4 | .833 |
| T–2 | Fort Wayne Zollner Pistons | 15 | 9 | .625 |
| T–2 | Akron Goodyear Wingfoots | 15 | 9 | .625 |
| 4 | Indianapolis Kautskys | 12 | 11 | .522 |
| 5 | Sheboygan Red Skins | 10 | 14 | .417 |
| 6 | Chicago Bruins | 8 | 15 | .348 |
| 7 | Toledo Jim White Chevrolets | 3 | 21 | .125 |

=== NBL Schedule ===
Not to be confused with exhibition or other non-NBL scheduled games that did not count towards Indianapolis' official NBL record for this season. An official database created by John Grasso detailing every NBL match possible (outside of two matches that the Kankakee Gallagher Trojans won over the Dayton Metropolitans in 1938) would be released in 2026 showcasing every team's official schedules throughout their time spent in the NBL. As such, these are the official results recorded for the Indianapolis Kautskys during their fourth season in the NBL (first and only season in their first, brief return) under that name for the league.

| # | Date | Opponent | Score | Record |
| 1 | November 30 | Toledo | 51–37 | 1–0 |
| 2 | December 3 | Fort Wayne | 53–51 (OT) | 2–0 |
| 3 | December 6 | @ Akron | 30–46 | 2–1 |
| 4 | December 7 | @ Toledo | 46–48 | 2–2 |
| 5 | December 14 | Akron | 35–28 | 3–2 |
| 6 | December 17 | Sheboygan | 64–31 | 4–2 |
| 7 | December 21 | Chicago | 38–31 | 5–2 |
| 8 | December 22 | @ Fort Wayne | 46–59 | 5–3 |
| 9 | December 28 | Fort Wayne | 41–46 | 5–4 |
| 10 | December 31 | @ Chicago | 37–33 (OT) | 6–4 |
| 11 | January 3 | @ Oshkosh | 44–56 | 6–5 |
| 12 | January 4 | @ Sheboygan | 30–32 (OT) | 6–6 |
| 13 | January 10 | @ Akron | 44–54 | 6–7 |
| 14 | January 11 | Toledo | 38–23 | 7–7 |
| 15 | January 18 | Oshkosh | 43–36 | 8–7 |
| 16 | January 26 | Sheboygan | 36–31 | 9–7 |
| 17 | February 1 | Toledo | 39–36 | 10–7 |
| 18 | February 7 | @ Oshkosh | 42–66 | 10–8 |
| 19 | February 8 (Game 1) | @ Oshkosh | 30–38 | 10–9 |
| 20 | February 8 (Game 2) | N Sheboygan | 25–34 | 10–10 |
| 21 | February 16 | Akron | 46–39 | 11–10 |
| 22 | February 17 | @ Fort Wayne | 46–50 | 11–11 |
| 23 | February 22 | Chicago | 58–41 | 12–11 |
| — | February 24† | @ Chicago | Cancelled | |

† – The road game scheduled between the Indianapolis Kautskys and the Chicago Bruins in Chicago, Illinois on February 24, 1942, was ultimately cancelled due to the fact that it didn't affect the standings of the NBL's season one way or the other since the Bruins were already eliminated from playoff contention and the Kautskys were already confirmed to be a playoff team, regardless of what the results would have been that day.

== NBL Playoffs ==
=== NBL Semifinals ===
(4) Indianapolis Kautskys vs. (1) Oshkosh All-Stars: Oshkosh wins series 2–0

- Game 1: March 1, 1942 @ Indianapolis: Oshkosh 40, Indianapolis 38
- Game 2: March 2, 1942 @ Oshkosh: Oshkosh 64, Indianapolis 48

=== Awards and honors ===
- Second Team All-NBL – Jewell Young

== World Professional Basketball Tournament ==
For the second straight year in a row and their first year while being a representative of the NBL again (they previously entered the 1941 event as an independent barnstorming franchise, being eliminated in the first round by the eventual WPBT champion Detroit Eagles, who were from the NBL at the time of play), the Indianapolis Kautskys would participate in the annual World Professional Basketball Tournament in Chicago, which the 1942 event was held on March 8–12, 1942 and featured 16 teams that were mostly independently ran alongside every NBL team outside of the Akron Goodyear Wingfoots due to World War II. In the first round of this year's event, the Kautskys would see themselves go up against the Long Island Grumman Flyers, who would be an integrated, military-operated independent team of sorts due to the players there all working for Grumman in Long Island, New York (thus being exempt from being called up for military (defensive) purposes during World War II while working there due to them being considered employees for Grumman's aircraft company) who primarily consisted of players that were previously a part of the rivaling American Basketball League's teams, as well as the all-black New York Renaissance and Washington Lichtman Bears teams. While the Long Island roster operated by Grumman was considered an unknown team of sorts heading into the tournament, the Grumman Flyers would end up becoming a team that would turn out to stun multiple teams throughout this competition, as Long Island squad would brutally upset Indianapolis in a 54–32 victory for Grumman's surprise squad that effectively saw an end to the Kautskys' time under that name for the rest of World War II going forward. Following their elimination from the WPBT, the Kautskys would effectively cease operations until the war officially concluded, only returning under that name again by 1945 following the bombings of Hiroshima and Nagasaki (though it's alleged that the Kautskys still competed in the next three WPBT events under the Indianapolis Pure Oils and Indianapolis Oilers names instead). As for the Long Island Grumman Flyers, they would continue their surprising run by upsetting the Chicago Bruins in the quarterfinal run before being eliminated by the defending WPBT champion Detroit Eagles (who would now be an independent team themselves) in a close match-up before winning their third place consolation prize match in an upset over the world famous (all-black) Harlem Globetrotters, while the Detroit Eagles would be upset by the two-time defending NBL champion Oshkosh All-Stars in a rematch of the 1941 WPBT championship match-up to avenge that defeat to have Oshkosh be dual champions for the season there.

=== Game Played ===
- Lost first round (32–54) to the Long Island Grumman Flyers
