= 1941–42 Sheboygan Red Skins season =

NBL professional basketball team season

- Head coach: Frank Zummach
- Arena: Eagles Auditorium

Results
- Record: 10–14 (.417)
- Place: Division: 5th
- Playoff finish: Did not qualify

The 1941–42 Sheboygan Red Skins season was the Red Skins' fourth year in the United States' National Basketball League (NBL), which would also be the fifth year the NBL itself existed. However, if one were to include their few seasons they played as an independent team under a few various team names involving local businesses like the The Ballhorns (being sponsored by a local florist and funeral parlor), the Art Imigs (being sponsored by a local dry cleaning shop owned and operated by a man named Art Imig with team jerseys saying Art Imig's), and the Enzo Jels (being sponsored by a local gelatin manufacturer known as Enzo-Pac) at various points before becoming the Sheboygan Red Skins due to their promotion up into the NBL, this would officially be their ninth overall season of play as well. For the second straight season in a row, the NBL would be without divisions altogether, as they would still be with only seven teams competing in the league, but they saw the Indianapolis Kautskys return to the NBL after leaving for a year to experiment as a barnstorming team and the additions of both the Fort Wayne Zollner Pistons (who would later continue competing in the present day as the Detroit Pistons in the NBA) and the Toledo Jim White Chevrolets (formerly known as the Toledo White Huts) replacing the losses of the Akron Firestone Non-Skids (the NBL's first repeating champions of the league), the Hammond Ciesar All-Americans and the Detroit Eagles, the last of whom had only recently won the 1941 World Professional Basketball Tournament as the first ever NBL team to win that event after it had previously been won by the New York Renaissance and the world-famous Harlem Globetrotters in the previous two events beforehand. The Red Skins played their home games at the Eagles Auditorium, which would be the last season they would do so.

Early on in this season, Sheboygan would start this season rather poorly after having a victory against the Akron Goodyear Wingfoots to start out another NBL season of theirs in November. By the end of December to finish the 1941 year, the Red Skins would end up having a 2–6 record, which included them being the last team to officially lose to the Toledo Jim White Chevrolets (a team that only won three total games, including a forfeited game by the Chicago Bruins and a game won during the Attack on Pearl Harbor over the Indianapolis Kautskys) and Sheboygan getting revenge for that by defeating Toledo on Christmas Day for their last game of the month. By January and early February, Sheboygan would look like a team that was trying to get a surprising last minute spot in the NBL Playoffs over teams like the Indianapolis Kautskys, with the Red Skins having 8–9 and then 9–10 records by the middle of February. However, Sheboygan would only win one more game against Toledo out of the final five games played that season to conclude this season with a 10–14 record, which led to them getting a fifth-place finish and automatically being eliminated from playoff contention this season. Following this season's end, Frank Zummach would be fired as the team's head coach going forward. Despite their disappointing conclusion to the season, Sheboygan would still see center Ed Dancker be named a member of the All-NBL Second Team by the end of this season.

== Roster ==
1941–42 Sheboygan Red Skins roster
Players

Pos.	No.	Player	Height	Weight	DOB	From
F		Thermon Blacklidge	6 ft 3 in (1.91 m)	185 lb (84 kg)	1920–03–19	Delta State
C		Ed Dancker	6 ft 7 in (2.01 m)	200 lb (91 kg)	1914–03–14	South Division HS (WI)
F		Charlie Epperson	6 ft 2 in (1.88 m)	180 lb (82 kg)	1919–06–16	Wisconsin
F/C		George Hesik	6 ft 2 in (1.88 m)	195 lb (88 kg)	1913–06–15	Marquette
G/F		Rube Lautenschlager	6 ft 2 in (1.88 m)	190 lb (86 kg)	1915–09–07	UW–Oshkosh
G		Paul Maki	6 ft 1 in (1.85 m)	175 lb (79 kg)	1918–02–01	Minnesota
G/F		Bill McDonald	6 ft 3 in (1.91 m)	190 lb (86 kg)	1916–11–05	Marquette
F		Paul Sokody	6 ft 2 in (1.88 m)	170 lb (77 kg)	1914–08–18	Marquette
G		Ken Suesens	6 ft 1 in (1.85 m)	175 lb (79 kg)	1916–10–23	Iowa
F/C		Jack Thornton	6 ft 5 in (1.96 m)	200 lb (91 kg)	1914–08–31	Texas Wesleyan
G/F		Babe Ziegenhorn	6 ft 0 in (1.83 m)	185 lb (84 kg)	1918–11–21	Notre Dame

Coaches
Head coach
- Frank Zummach

Legend
- (DP) Unsigned draft pick
- (FA) Free agent
- (S) Suspended
- Injured

Roster

== Regular season ==
=== Season standings ===
Pos.	League Standings	Wins	Losses	Win %
1	Oshkosh All-Stars	20	4	.833
T–2	Fort Wayne Zollner Pistons	15	9	.625
T–2	Akron Goodyear Wingfoots	15	9	.625
4	Indianapolis Kautskys	12	11	.522
5	Sheboygan Red Skins	10	14	.417
6	Chicago Bruins	8	15	.348
7	Toledo Jim White Chevrolets	3	21	.125

=== NBL Schedule ===
#	Date	Opponent	Score	Record
1	November 27	Akron	37–34	1–0
2	December 4	Chicago	38–51	1–1
3	December 6	@ Oshkosh	30–52	1–2
4	December 11	Oshkosh	45–47	1–3
5	December 14	@ Toledo	34–41	1–4
6	December 16	@ Fort Wayne	35–50	1–5
7	December 17	@ Indianapolis	31–64	1–6
8	December 25	Toledo	42–28	2–6
9	January 4	Indianapolis	32–30 (OT)	3–6
10	January 15	Akron	42–33	4–6
11	January 22	Oshkosh	32–34	4–7
12	January 24	@ Akron	45–44	5–7
13	January 26	@ Indianapolis	31–36	5–8
14	January 28	@ Chicago	40–39	6–8
15	January 29	Fort Wayne	44–49 (OT)	6–9
16	February 5	Chicago	45–40 (OT)	7–9
17	February 8	Indianapolis	34–25	8–9
18	February 10	@ Sheboygan	40–62	8–10
19	February 12	Toledo	67–38	9–10
20	February 15	Fort Wayne	38–40	9–11
21	February 18	@ Chicago	36–40	9–12
22	February 19	Toledo	43–41	10–12
23	February 21	@ Akron	42–55	10–13
24	February 23	@ Fort Wayne	39–46	10–14

=== Awards and honors ===
- Second Team All-NBL – Ed Dancker
- NBL All-Time Team – Ed Dancker

== World Professional Basketball Tournament ==
For the fourth year in a row, the Sheboygan Red Skins would participate in the annual World Professional Basketball Tournament in Chicago, which the 1942 event was held on March 8–12, 1942 and was mostly held by independently ran teams (including military operated teams) alongside every NBL team from this season outside of the Akron Goodyear Wingfoots (with the Toledo Jim White Chevrolets returning to their original Toledo White Huts name) due in part to World War II. For the first round, Sheboygan would go up against the Columbus Bobb Chevrolets, who had Red Foster as their best player that round with future high school coach Neal Mosser being the only other notable player from that team. The Red Skins would end up defeating the short-lived Columbus roster 34–26 in order to move on into the quarterfinal round of the series. Unfortunately for Sheboygan, their next opponent would be the world famous (all-black) Harlem Globetrotters, which would be the same team that originally defeated them in the third place consolation prize game in the inaugural 1939 World Professional Basketball Tournament. Similar to that third place consolation prize game, the Globetrotters would utilize the usual comedic chicannery that they would be known for throughout the match to defeat the Red Skins in another close match, this time seeing Harlem defeating Sheboygan with a 37–32 final score to eliminate Sheboygan in the quarterfinal round with Roosie Hudson scoring 12 points and Bernie Price putting up 11 points for the Globetrotters, while Paul Sokody scored 11 points for the Red Skins. The world famous Harlem Globetrotters would later be eliminated in the semifinal round by the two-time NBL champions in the Oshkosh All-Stars (who later became the WPBT champions this time around following their championship rematch victory over the now-independently ran Detroit Eagles), with Harlem also losing their third place consolation prize round game to the Long Island Grumman Flyers team that was manned by players that played for both the rivaling American Basketball League and the all-black New York Renaissance who worked for Grumman as a way to avoid being called up for U.S. military service during World War II due to them helping out the war industry at the time.

=== Games ===
- Won first round (34–26) to the Columbus Bobb Chevrolets.
- Lost quarterfinal round (32–37) to the Harlem Globetrotters.
