= 1941–42 Chicago Bruins season =

NBL professional basketball team season

- Head coach: Jack Tierney
- Owner(s): George Halas; Charles Bidwill
- Arena: Chicago Stadium

Results
- Record: 8–15 (.348)
- Place: Division: 6th
- Playoff finish: Did not qualify

The 1941–42 Chicago Bruins season was the Bruins' third and final season of existence when playing professionally for the National Basketball League (though not their third professional basketball season as a whole (and depending on who you ask, not necessarily their final season of existence as a franchise also)), which officially was the fifth season the NBL existed as a professional basketball league after previously existing as a semi-pro or amateur basketball league called the Midwest Basketball Conference in its first two seasons back in 1935. The reason why this is not the third (and potentially final) professional basketball season the Bruins ever had as a franchise throughout their history was because they had originally existed as a professional basketball team in the original rendition of the American Basketball League that had existed from 1925 to 1931 before the Great Depression caused a hiatus on the ABL in order for it to return a couple of years later on a smaller basis (and minus the Bruins) in 1933, years before the NBL or even its predecessor in the Midwest Basketball Conference were even created. As such, if we include their original six ABL years alongside the potential independent seasons of play (including the season where they played as the Chicago Harmons in the inaugural World Professional Basketball Tournament) and their first two NBL seasons of existence, this would, at the very least, be their tenth (and potentially final) season of play (though they could have played more seasons than just ten total, with the potential amount of seasons played going up to nineteen total seasons). Entering this season, both the Bruins and the NBL would have their second straight season without divisional play at hand, as while the Indianapolis Kautskys returned to play in the NBL this season due to them seeing negative results as a barnstorming franchise and the Toledo Jim White Chevrolets would join the NBL following their previous success in the 1941 World Professional Basketball Tournament under the Toledo White Huts name, the Detroit Eagles would leave the NBL to become a barnstorming team themselves following their upset championship winning performance in the same 1941 WPBT event, with the Hammond Ciesar All-Americans also leaving the NBL entirely due to financial issues on their ends.

Originally, Chicago was set to have their home debut on December 17, 1941 against the defending NBL champion Oshkosh All-Stars at their usual home venue in the 132nd Regiment Armory, but due to the Attack on Pearl Harbor by the Empire of Japan that occurred ten days prior to the Bruins' home debut in the NBL (which resulted in the U.S. military needing to utilize regiment armories like the one that the Chicago Bruins were using as a home stadium for most of their existence due to the U.S.A. preparing to enter World War II), the team was forced to scramble to find a new home venue to play in for the rest of this season, which they did utilize with the Chicago Stadium being a very suitable last-minute replacement for the team. While the Bruins would try their best to maintain composure throughout the rest of the season, the loss of their original home venue and the lack of coverage by their local media (primarily with the Chicago Tribune giving less coverage for the Bruins and bringing more coverage to the local Great Lakes Naval Training Station (who had compiled a 31–5 record in the basketball games they played in) and Chanute Army Air Force Technical Training Command military sports games (such as basketball) by comparison) would prove to be too much for the team to overcome, as Chicago would end their third and final season in the NBL with a very disappointing 8–15 finish that included a forfeited victory and a forfeited loss to the newly created Toledo Jim White Chevrolets, as well as a cancelled season finale game on February 24, 1942 against the newly returning Indianapolis Kautskys due to the Kautskys already solidifying their position as the last playoff team for the NBL by that time and the Bruins already being eliminated from playoff contention in the process. Following this season's conclusion, the Bruins would be replaced by the Chicago Studebaker Flyers (a team owned by Studebaker, with payments towards their players coming from the United Auto Workers Association) for the 1942–43 season that would only last for one season themselves. While the Studebaker Flyers have sometimes been considered a continuation of the Chicago Bruins, they ultimately are not a continuation of the Bruins due to the fact that team owner George Halas always had the option to re-open that franchise again whenever he wanted to do so; he ultimately just never chose to do so due to the greater success he had with the Chicago Bears in the NFL.

Despite the abject failure the Bruins had this season, they would still see Ralph Vaughn make it to the All-NBL Second Team, as well as see a new player from the 1942 World Professional Basketball Tournament in Mickey Tierney (son of head coach Jack Tierney) make it to the All-Tournament Team during that event. In addition to that final World Professional Basketball Tournament that the Bruins franchise would ever play in, the Chicago Bruins also participated in the Cleveland Pro Basketball Invitational Tournament (an alternative professional basketball tournament that was similar to the WPBT, with the inaugural event being won by the Philadelphia Sphas over the Original Celtics in one of their last known appearances as a franchise) as well, with them surprisingly going as far as the championship round there before ultimately losing to the all-black New York Renaissance through a 62–51 loss as the final score of that specific championship match-up (with the Renaissance later winning the next two Cleveland Pro Basketball Invitational Tournaments as well before records for the 1945 event got lost to time as of 2026, with the 1945 event being the last time that tournament ever got played in general).

== Roster ==
Please note that due to the way records for professional basketball leagues like the NBL and the ABL were recorded at the time, some information on both teams and players may be harder to list out than usual here.

Player	Position
John Drish	F
Dick Evans	F-C
George Hogan	G-F
Wibs Kautz	G-F
Otto Kolar	G-F
Vince McGowan	F-C
George Morse	G-F
Mike Novak	C
Lou Possner	F-C
George Ratkovicz	F-C
Ed Sachs	G
Ted Strain	G
Stan Szukala	G
Ralph Vaughn	G-F

In addition to them, there was also another individual with the last name of Morris who played only one game for the Bruins this season that would not have proper credit for his sole appearance on the team there otherwise, though it's considered possible the "Morris" guy in question in this case is a forward/center that went by Edward F. "Moose" Norris and previously attended DePaul University before playing for the Bruins. Alternatively, it could have been George Morse's last name being misspelled as Morris for some odd reason in the newspaper that covered the Bruins during that match in question.

== Regular season ==
=== Season standings ===
Pos.	League Standings	Wins	Losses	Win %
1	Oshkosh All-Stars	20	4	.833
T–2	Fort Wayne Zollner Pistons	15	9	.625
T–2	Akron Goodyear Wingfoots	15	9	.625
4	Indianapolis Kautskys	12	11	.522
5	Sheboygan Red Skins	10	14	.417
6	Chicago Bruins	8	15	.348
7	Toledo Jim White Chevrolets	3	21	.125

=== NBL Schedule ===
Not to be confused with exhibition or other non-NBL scheduled games that did not count towards Chicago's official NBL record for this season. An official database created by John Grasso detailing every NBL match possible (outside of two matches that the Kankakee Gallagher Trojans won over the Dayton Metropolitans in 1938) would be released in 2026 showcasing every team's official schedules throughout their time spent in the NBL. As such, these are the official results recorded for the Chicago Bruins during their third and final season (of existence) out in the NBL.

- December 1, 1941 @ Fort Wayne, IN: Chicago Bruins 46, Fort Wayne Zollner Pistons 48
- December 4, 1941 @ Sheboygan, WI: Chicago Bruins 51, Sheboygan Red Skins 38
- December 10, 1941 @ Toledo, OH: The Toledo Jim White Chevrolets would win their home match over the Chicago Bruins by forfeiture. (As such, 2–0 favoring the Toledo Jim White Chevrolets would be the official recorded score for this match.)
- December 13, 1941 @ Oshkosh, WI: Chicago Bruins 46, Oshkosh All-Stars 54
- December 17, 1941 @ Chicago, IL: Oshkosh All-Stars 42, Chicago Bruins 29
- December 21, 1941 @ Indianapolis, IN: Chicago Bruins 31, Indianapolis Kautskys 38
- December 22, 1941 @ Chicago, IL: The Chicago Bruins would win their home match over the Toledo Jim White Chevrolets by forfeiture. (As such, 2–0 favoring the Chicago Bruins would be the official recorded score for this match.)
- December 25, 1941 @ Chicago, IL: Chicago Bruins 38, Fort Wayne Zollner Pistons 47
- December 27, 1941 @ Akron, OH: Chicago Bruins 47, Akron Goodyear Wingfoots 50
- December 31, 1941 @ Chicago, IL: Indianapolis Kautskys 37, Chicago Bruins 33
- January 7, 1942 @ Chicago, IL: Akron Goodyear Wingfoots 43, Chicago Bruins 34
- January 14, 1942 @ Chicago, IL: Toledo Jim White Chevrolets 31, Chicago Bruins 53
- January 21, 1942 @ Chicago, IL: Fort Wayne Zollner Pistons 47, Chicago Bruins 51
- January 27, 1942 @ Fort Wayne, IN: Chicago Bruins 41, Fort Wayne Zollner Pistons 40
- January 28, 1942 @ Chicago, IL: Sheboygan Red Skins 40, Chicago Bruins 39
- January 31, 1942 @ Oshkosh, WI: Chicago Bruins 43, Oshkosh All-Stars 61
- February 3, 1942 @ Chicago, IL: Chicago Bruins 52, Akron Goodyear Wingfoots 48
- February 5, 1942 @ Sheboygan, WI: Chicago Bruins 40, Sheboygan Red Skins 45
- February 11, 1942 @ Cicero, IL: Oshkosh All-Stars 48, Chicago Bruins 38
- February 14, 1942 @ Akron, OH: Chicago Bruins 24, Akron Goodyear Wingfoots 44
- February 15, 1942 @ Toledo, OH: Chicago Bruins 53, Toledo Jim White Chevrolets 41
- February 18, 1942 @ Chicago, IL: Sheboygan Red Skins 36, Chicago Bruins 40
- February 22, 1942 @ Indianapolis, IN: Indianapolis Kautskys 58, Chicago Bruins 41

The home game scheduled between the Chicago Bruins and the Indianapolis Kautskys on February 25, 1942 was ultimately cancelled due to the fact that it did not affect the standings of the NBL's season one way or the other since the Kautskys were already confirmed to be a playoff team and the Bruins were already eliminated from playoff contention regardless of what the results would have been that day.

== Awards and honors ==
- All-NBL Second Team – Ralph Vaughn
- NBL All-Time Team – Mike Novak

== World Professional Basketball Tournament ==
For the fourth year in a row (third (and final) year in a row under the Chicago Bruins team name properly), the Chicago Bruins would participate in the World Professional Basketball Tournament, with the 1942 event taking place in their home city of Chicago (once again) from March 8–12, 1942 that were mostly held by independently ran teams (including the former NBL team in the Detroit Eagles, though excluding the Toledo White Huts due to a unique condition they had where the team that's named the Toledo Jim White Chevrolets could play games under their original Toledo White Huts name from the 1941 WPBT) alongside every NBL team outside of the Akron Goodyear Wingfoots due, at least in part, to World War II in a now-16 team tournament. During this event, the Bruins would add head coach Jack Tierney's son, Mickey Tierney from Purdue University (and later from the Wisconsin State Technical College), Forest Sprawl from Purdue University, Don Blanken from Purdue University, and future NBL/NBA and NFL player Clint Wager from St. Mary's College of Minnesota onto the team's roster. In the first round of this year's event, the Bruins would see themselves go up against the Detroit AAA team, who would be led by Walt Tanana from Lawrence Tech University (and was the grandfather of Frank Tanana) and Bob Roth (who previously played for the Detroit Hed-Aids in the NBL's precursor name in the Midwest Basketball Conference) during that match. While Tanana and Roth alongside former MBC/NBL and future NBL players from the Detroit squad would keep things relatively close with the Bruins, Chicago would ultimately defeat the Detroit AAA team with a 56–46 victory to move onto the second round, thanks in major part to new players Mickey Tierney and Forest Sprowl alongside veteran Bruins player Wibs Kautz.

In the quarterfinal round, the Bruins would see themselves go up against the Long Island Grumman Flyers, who would be an integrated, military-operated independent team of sorts due to the players there all working for Grumman in Long Island, New York (thus being exempt from being called up for military (defensive) purposes during World War II while working there due to them being considered employees for Grumman's aircraft company) who primarily consisted of players that were previously a part of the rivaling American Basketball League's teams, as well as the all-black New York Renaissance and Washington Lichtman Bears teams. While the Long Island roster operated by Grumman was considered an unknown team of sorts heading into the tournament, the Grumman Flyers would continue to stun their competition throughout most of the WPBT, as the Long Island squad would upset the Bruins in a 48–38 victory for Grumman's surprise squad that effectively saw the Bruins play their last games in franchise history by this point in time (despite the best efforts of players like Mickey Tierney and Forest Sprowl); following the Chicago Bruins' exit from the event, they would end up being pulled out of the NBL and never return in any real capacity ever again (despite team owner George Halas having the ability to do so whenever he wanted to at the time), with their place in the NBL later being taken over and replaced by the Chicago Studebaker Flyers (who would not have the same team history as the Chicago Bruins). As for the Long Island squad, they would end up being defeated in a close semifinal round match against the defending WPBT champion Detroit Eagles (who had previously left the NBL this season due to venue issues and later lost the WPBT championship to the two-time defending NBL champion Oshkosh All-Stars, thus making Oshkosh the first NBL team to be dual champions in both the NBL and the WPBT), though they would win the third place consolation prize match in a similarly close manner over the world famous Harlem Globetrotters. After the tournament officially ended, however, Chicago would see one of the Bruins be named a member of the All-Tournament Team with Mickey Tierney being named a member of that All-Tournament Team (which consisted of ten players this time around instead of the more typical five players at hand).

=== Scores ===
- Won the first round (56–46) over the Detroit AAA team.
- Lost quarterfinal round (38–48) to the Long Island Grumman Flyers.

=== Awards and honors ===
- Mickey Tierney, All-Tournament Team
