= 1941–42 National Basketball League (United States) season =

1941–42 NBL season
- League: National Basketball League
- Sport: Basketball
- Duration: November 25, 1941 – February 25, 1942; February 27–March 2, 1942 (Playoffs); March 4–6, 1942 (Finals)
- Games: 23-24
- Teams: 7

Regular season
- Season champions: Oshkosh All-Stars
- Top seed: Oshkosh All-Stars
- Season MVP: Bobby McDermott (Fort Wayne)
- Top scorer: Chuck Chuckovits (Toledo)

Playoffs
- First semifinal champions: Oshkosh All-Stars
- First semifinal runners-up: Indianapolis Kautskys
- Second semifinal champions: Fort Wayne Zollner Pistons
- Second semifinal runners-up: Akron Goodyear Wingfoots

Finals
- Venue: South Park School Gymnasium, Oshkosh, Wisconsin; North Side High School Gym, Fort Wayne, Indiana
- Champions: Oshkosh All-Stars
- Runners-up: Fort Wayne Zollner Pistons

NBL seasons
- ← 1940–41 1942–43 →

The 1941–42 NBL season was the seventh National Basketball League (NBL) season. The regular season began on November 25, 1941, and ran until February 25, 1942. This was the second straight NBL regular season to be played without divisions due to the number of teams joining and leaving the league this season. The playoffs began on February 27, 1942, and concluded on March 6, 1942, with the Oshkosh All-Stars successfully defending their NBL title against the Fort Wayne Zollner Pistons by two games to one.

The season was impacted by the American entry into World War II in early December 1941 following the attack on Pearl Harbor, with the Chicago Bruins losing access to their home venue at the 132nd Regiment Armory. It also marked the official breaking of the color barrier within the NBL under that league name, with the Toledo Jim White Chevrolets fielding multiple black players and a Latin American player during the season.

== Teams ==
Three teams did not return from the previous season. Both the Akron Firestone Non-Skids works team and the Hammond Ciesar All-Americans disbanded operations for good this season. As for the Detroit Eagles, who had recently come off of a championship victory in the World Professional Basketball Tournament, they ended up leaving the league to become a barnstorming franchise after they once again failed to secure a home venue for the long-term, with this season being their permanent departure from the NBL.

The Indianapolis Kautskys returned to the league after their own season of play as a barnstorming team. Meanwhile, both the Fort Wayne Zollner Pistons and Toledo Jim White Chevrolets (also known by their previous name, the Toledo White Huts) entered the league for the first time. Throughout this season of play, whenever the Toledo franchise played games that were not officially scheduled by the NBL themselves (which included the annual World Professional Basketball Tournament), the Jim White Chevrolets would return to their original White Huts franchise name due to a unique stipulation involved with the original ownership's franchise rights at hand. As for the Fort Wayne Zollner Pistons, they would join the NBL after the works team owned and operated by Fred Zollner wanted some better competition for his players to go up against, especially following their appearance in the 1941 World Professional Basketball Tournament. Out of every team involved, the Zollner Pistons would be the only remaining team still existing in the present day, albeit as the Detroit Pistons in the National Basketball Association.

National Basketball League
Akron Goodyear Wingfoots

Akron, Ohio

Chicago Bruins

Chicago, Illinois

Fort Wayne Zollner Pistons

Fort Wayne, Indiana

Indianapolis Kautskys

Indianapolis, Indiana

Oshkosh All-Stars

Oshkosh, Wisconsin

Sheboygan Red Skins

Sheboygan, Wisconsin

Toledo Jim White Chevrolets/Toledo White Huts

Toledo, Ohio

Coaching changes
Offseason
Team	1940–41 coach	1941–42 coach
Chicago Bruins	Frank Linksey (player-coach)	Jack Tierney
Indianapolis Kautskys	Abe Goldsmith (WPBT)	Frank Kautsky
Oshkosh All-Stars	George Hotchkiss	Lon Darling

== Regular season ==
The regular season used a 24-game schedule, where each team was scheduled to play every other team four times (twice at home, twice away). One inconsequential late-season game between the Indianapolis Katuskys and Chicago Bruins was cancelled without a forfeit.

The Akron Goodyear Wingfoots changed venues during the middle of the season, leaving their own Goodyear Hall that they owned for the nearby Akron Armory, home of the Akron Zips. Chicago also lost access to their venue at the 132nd Regiment Armory due to the United States entering World War II following the Attack on Pearl Harbor before they played a single home game this season. They relocated to the larger International Amphitheatre by the time they started to play their first home game in the season.

News of the attack on Pearl Harbor on December 7, 1941, reached the NBL during live play, with an announcement of the attack taking place over loudspeaker during the game between Indianapolis and Akron. The Oshkosh All-Stars also played the Sheboygan Red Skins on December 7, but the game between the Chicago Bruins and the Toledo Jim White Chevrolets a couple of days later was forfeited by Chicago, with Toledo later forfeiting a match back to Chicago on December 22.

Due to concerns over talent loss from NBL players joining the U.S. military, the league permitted the signing of non-white players for the first time. Toledo was the first team to take advantage of this new policy, becoming the first team to field black players on their team. Toledo also fielded Al Alvarez, an Argentine basketball player who became the first Latin American to play in the NBL.

=== Final standings ===
Pos.	League Standings	Wins	Losses	Win %
1	Oshkosh All-Stars	20	4	.833
T–2	Fort Wayne Zollner Pistons	15	9	.625
T–2	Akron Goodyear Wingfoots	15	9	.625
4	Indianapolis Kautskys	12	11	.522
5	Sheboygan Red Skins	10	14	.417
6	Chicago Bruins	8	15	.348
7	Toledo Jim White Chevrolets	3	21	.125

== Postseason ==
=== Playoffs ===
The top four teams qualified for the playoffs, with the semifinals pitting the 1-seed against the 4-seed and the 2-seed against the 3-seed in a best-of-three series. This was a slight adjustment from the previous season, which had the 1-seed play the 3-seed and the 2-seed play the 4-seed. The winners of the semifinal matchups would play each other for the NBL Championship in a best-of-three series.

The defending champion Oshkosh All-Stars, Akron Goodyear Wingfoots, Fort Wayne Zollner Pistons, and Indianapolis Katuskys had the best four records during the regular season. Akron and Fort Wayne, having tied for second place at 15 wins and 9 losses each, had their seed determined by coin toss. Fort Wayne drew the 2-seed and home-court advantage over Akron and went on to defeat the Wingfoots 2–1 to qualify for the finals. Meanwhile, Oshkosh swept Indianapolis 2–0 to return to the championship series.

In the championship series, the All-Stars defeated the Pistons 2–1 to claim their second consecutive NBL title. Oshkosh would have their games be run on the radio airwaves on WHBY during this season.

This season would end up becoming the final season in NBL history where the league's championship would be named the "Shaughnessy Trophy" in honor of Frank Shaughnessy, the creator of the Shaughnessy playoff system that the NBL would use throughout the majority of its existence; the following season onward up until the league's eventual merger with the later creation of the Basketball Association of America to create the present-day National Basketball Association, named their championship the "James Naismith Trophy" in honor of Dr. James Naismith, the sport of basketball's creator that would live to see the NBL's creation.

==== Bracket ====
Semifinals
1	Oshkosh All-Stars	2
4	Indianapolis Kautskys	0
2/3	Fort Wayne Zollner Pistons	2
2/3	Akron Goodyear Wingfoots	1

NBL Championship
1	Oshkosh All-Stars	2
2(/3)	Fort Wayne Zollner Pistons	1

- Bold Series winner

=== World Professional Basketball Tournament ===
Following the completion of the playoffs, six of the seven NBL teams competed in the 1942 edition of the World Professional Basketball Tournament. The Fort Wayne Zollner Pistons, Indianapolis Katuskys, and Toledo Jim White Chevrolets (competing as the Toledo White Huts) were each eliminated in the first round, with the Chevrolets being eliminated at the hands of the former NBL team known as the Detroit Eagles. The Chicago Bruins and Sheboygan Red Skins were eliminated in the quarterfinal round by the Harlem Globetrotters and the Long Island Grumman Flyers, respectively. The Oshkosh All-Stars defeated the New York Rens in the quarterfinals, the Globetrotters in the semi-finals, and the Eagles in the final to win the tournament. The Akron Goodyear Wingfoots were the only NBL team to not participate in the tournament.

=== NBL All-Star Game ===
An all-star game between the Oshkosh All-Stars and the best players from the other NBL teams was announced on February 3, 1942, and scheduled for the end of the season at a to-be-determined venue in either Milwaukee, Oshkosh, or Sheboygan. Following the All-Stars' victory in the World Professional Basketball Tournament, the all-star game was scheduled for March 18, 1942 at the All-Stars' home venue in Oshkosh. In this game, the NBL All-Star team would defeat the Oshkosh All-Stars by a 45–43 final score.

March 18, 1942

NBL All-Stars 45, Oshkosh All-Stars 43
Scoring by quarter: 7–13, 16–4, 14–12, 8–14
Pts: Chuck Chuckovits (12)	Pts: Gene Englund (16)

South Park School Gymnasium
Referees: Art Mansfield, Frank Kriznecky

== Statistical leaders ==
Category	Player	Team	Stat
Points	Chuck Chuckovits	Toledo Jim White Chevrolets	406
Free-Throws	Chuck Chuckovits	Toledo Jim White Chevrolets	120
Field goals	Chuck Chuckovits	Toledo Jim White Chevrolets	143

Note: Prior to the 1969–70 NBA season, league leaders in points were determined by totals rather than averages. Also, rebounding and assist numbers were not recorded properly in the NBL like they would be in the BAA/NBA, as would field goal and free-throw shooting percentages.

== NBL awards ==
- NBL Most Valuable Player: Bobby McDermott, Fort Wayne Zollner Pistons
- NBL Coach of the Year: Lon Darling, Oshkosh All-Stars
- NBL Rookie of the Year: George Glamack, Akron Goodyear Wingfoots
- All-NBL First Team:
  - F/G – Chuck Chuckovits, Toledo Jim White Chevrolets
  - F/G – Charley Shipp, Oshkosh All-Stars
  - C/F – Leroy Edwards, Oshkosh All-Stars
  - G/F – Ben Stephens, Akron Goodyear Wingfoots
  - G – Bobby McDermott, Fort Wayne Zollner Pistons
- All-NBL Second Team:
  - F – Jewell Young, Indianapolis Kautskys
  - F/C – George Glamack, Akron Goodyear Wingfoots
  - C – Ed Dancker, Sheboygan Red Skins
  - G/F – Ralph Vaughn, Chicago Bruins
  - G/F – Herm Schaefer, Fort Wayne Zollner Pistons

== See also ==
- National Basketball League (United States)
