= 1941–42 Oshkosh All-Stars season =

NBL professional basketball team season

- NBL champions
- Division champions
- Head coach: Lon Darling
- Arena: South Park School Gymnasium

Results
- Record: 20–4 (.833)
- Place: Division: 1st
- Playoff finish: NBL champions (Won 2–1 over Fort Wayne Zollner Pistons)
- Radio: WHBY

The 1941–42 Oshkosh All-Stars season was the All-Stars' fifth year in the United States' National Basketball League (NBL), which was also the fifth year the league existed. However, if one were to include the independent seasons they played starting all the way back in 1929 before beginning their NBL tenure in 1937, this would officially be their twelfth season of play. Seven teams competed in the NBL in 1941–42 and the league did not use divisions. The All-Stars played their home games at South Park School Gymnasium.

For the fifth consecutive season, the All-Stars finished the season with either a division or league best record (20–4). The 20–4 record Oshkosh had that season would later end up becoming the best record the All-Stars franchise would have in their time in the NBL. They then went on to win their second consecutive league championship by defeating the Fort Wayne Zollner Pistons, two games to one in a best-of-three series.

Head coach Lon Darling won the league's Coach of the Year Award. Players Leroy Edwards and Charley Shipp earned First Team All-NBL honors for the second straight season.

In addition to the NBL Playoffs, the Oshkosh All-Stars also participated in the World Professional Basketball Tournament as well. The All-Stars would only compete against some independently ran teams in the Davenport Central Turner Rockets, the New York Renaissance, the Harlem Globetrotters, and the previous WPBT champion team that was formerly an NBL team that turned themselves into an independent barnstorming team known as the Detroit Eagles, being denied the opportunity to match up against any of the competing NBL teams that joined the WPBT this year. However, unlike the previous seasons that the All-Stars participated in the tournament, Oshkosh would manage to win the 1942 WPBT, being the first professional basketball team to win multiple championships in the same season; that honor would only be repeated three more times in the WPBT's history by the NBL's Fort Wayne Zollner Pistons in 1944 & 1945 as well as the NBL's Minneapolis Lakers in 1948.

== Roster ==
1941–42 Oshkosh All-Stars roster
Players

Pos.	No.	Player	Height	Weight	DOB	From
F	21	Lou Barle	6 ft 1 in (1.85 m)	200 lb (91 kg)	1916–06–23	Minnesota Duluth
F/C	25	Connie Mack Berry	6 ft 3 in (1.91 m)	215 lb (98 kg)	1915–04–19	NC State
C	23	Leroy Edwards	6 ft 5 in (1.96 m)	210 lb (95 kg)	1914–04–11	Kentucky
G	17	Bud Engdahl	6 ft 1 in (1.85 m)	210 lb (95 kg)	1918–07–01	UW–Superior
F/C	19	Gene Englund	6 ft 5 in (1.96 m)	205 lb (93 kg)	1917–10–21	Wisconsin
G/F	12	Bill Komenich	6 ft 3 in (1.91 m)	210 lb (95 kg)	1916–07–01	Marquette
G	15	Tommy Nisbet	5 ft 10 in (1.78 m)	165 lb (75 kg)	1916–03–31	Illinois
G/F	14	Erv Prasse	6 ft 2 in (1.88 m)	190 lb (86 kg)	1917–12–01	Iowa
G/F	24	Eddie Riska	6 ft 0 in (1.83 m)	175 lb (79 kg)	1919–10–04	Notre Dame
G/F	16	Charley Shipp	6 ft 1 in (1.85 m)	200 lb (91 kg)	1913–12–03	Catholic
G/F	31	Herm Witasek	6 ft 2 in (1.88 m)	210 lb (95 kg)	1913–10–16	North Dakota

Coaches
Head coach
- Lon Darling

Legend
- (DP) Unsigned draft pick
- (FA) Free agent
- (S) Suspended
- Injured

Roster

Note: Herm Witasek was not on the playoffs roster

== Regular season ==
=== Season standings ===
Pos.	League Standings	Wins	Losses	Win %
1	Oshkosh All-Stars	20	4	.833
T–2	Fort Wayne Zollner Pistons	15	9	.625
T–2	Akron Goodyear Wingfoots	15	9	.625
4	Indianapolis Kautskys	12	11	.522
5	Sheboygan Red Skins	10	14	.417
6	Chicago Bruins	8	15	.348
7	Toledo Jim White Chevrolets	3	21	.125

=== NBL Schedule ===
Not to be confused with exhibition or other non-NBL scheduled games that did not count towards Oshkosh's official NBL record for this season, Oshkosh would start their season with a franchise best 11–0 record that was second only to the 1938–39 Akron Firestone Non-Skids for the best start to an NBL season possible. Losses to only the Akron Goodyear Wingfoots on January 17, 1942, the Indianapolis Kautskys the day after that, the Fort Wayne Zollner Pistons on February 2, and the Akron Goodyear Wingfoots once again to close out the season on February 25 would help solidify this Oshkosh All-Stars squad as arguably their best roster ever constructed.

#	Date	Opponent	Score	Record
1	November 25	Akron	37–34	1–0
2	December 6	Sheboygan	52–30	2–0
3	December 11	@ Sheboygan	47–45	3–0
4	December 13	Chicago	54–46	4–0
5	December 17	@ Chicago	42–29	5–0
6	December 20	@ Akron	42–35	6–0
7	December 26	Toledo	48–38	7–0
8	January 3	Indianapolis	56–44	8–0
9	January 6	@ Fort Wayne	41–33	9–0
10	January 7	@ Toledo	55–47	10–0
11	January 10	Fort Wayne	57–47	11–0
12	January 17	@ Akron	43–53	11–1
13	January 18	@ Indianapolis	36–43	11–2
14	January 22	@ Sheboygan	34–32	12–2
15	January 29	N Toledo	55–50	13–2
16	January 31	Chicago	61–43	14–2
17	February 2	@ Fort Wayne	30–43	14–3
18	February 7	Indianapolis	68–42	15–3
19	February 8	Indianapolis	38–30	16–3
20	February 10	Sheboygan	60–42	17–3
21	February 11	N Chicago	48–38	18–3
22	February 14	Fort Wayne	72–47	19–3
23	February 21	Toledo	66–51	20–3
24	February 25	@ Akron	41–44	20–4

== NBL Playoffs ==
=== NBL Semifinals ===
(1) Oshkosh All-Stars vs. (4) Indianapolis Kautskys: Oshkosh wins series 2–0

- Game 1 @ Indianapolis: Oshkosh 40, Indianapolis 33
- Game 2 @ Oshkosh: Oshkosh 64, Indianapolis 48

=== NBL Championship ===
(1) Oshkosh All-Stars vs. (2) Fort Wayne Zollner Pistons: Oshkosh wins series 2–1

- Game 1 @ Fort Wayne: Fort Wayne 61, Oshkosh 43
- Game 2 @ Oshkosh: Oshkosh 68, Fort Wayne 60
- Game 3 @ Oshkosh: Oshkosh 52, Fort Wayne 46

=== Awards and honors ===
- NBL Coach of the Year – Lon Darling
- First Team All-NBL – Leroy Edwards and Charley Shipp
- All-Time NBL Team – Leroy Edwards, Gene Englund, and Charley Shipp

== World Professional Basketball Tournament ==
For the fourth straight year in a row, the Oshkosh All-Stars would participate in the annual World Professional Basketball Tournament in Chicago, which the 1942 event was held on March 8–12, 1942 and was mostly held by independently ran teams due in part to World War II. In the first round, Oshkosh crushed the Davenport Central Turner Rockets 44–29. In the quarterfinal round, the All-Stars managed to upset the inaugural champions of the WPBT, the New York Renaissance, winning 44–38. By the semifinal round, Oshkosh managed to upset the 1940 WPBT champions, the Harlem Globetrotters, by winning 48–41 to enter the championship round once again for a rematch against the 1941 WPBT champions, the Detroit Eagles. In the final match, Oshkosh was ahead of Detroit 20–10 entering the half, but the Eagles managed to get themselves ahead of the All-Stars by one point late in the match. However, unlike the previous year's WPBT championship match against Detroit, Oshkosh would end up managing to get an extra edge over the Eagles thanks to the inspired play of veteran star Leroy Edwards, who had been handicapped due to a knee injury and played sparingly during the tournament, but hobbled himself off the bench to score five quick points to combine with Gene Englund's 17 points that night and Ed Riska's MVP worthy play to help the All-Stars get their revenge on the Detroit Eagles and win 43–41 to be the first NBL team to win both the NBL's championship and the WPBT's championship in the same season. Following the conclusion of the tournament, the All-Stars players all received gold watches as their special prizes for winning the event this year.

=== Games ===
- Won first round (44–29) over Davenport Central Turner Rockets
- Won quarterfinal round (44–38) over New York Renaissance
- Won semifinal round (48–41) over Harlem Globetrotters
- Won championship round (43–41) over Detroit Eagles

=== Awards and Records ===
- Gene Englund, All-Tournament Team, WPBT leading scorer (52 points scored in four games)
- Ed Riska, All-Tournament Team, MVP
