= 1941–42 Fort Wayne Zollner Pistons season =

First season of the Pistons in the NBL

- Head coach: Carl Bennett
- Owner: Fred and Janet Zollner
- Arena: North Side High School Gym, Fort Wayne, Indiana

Results
- Record: 15–9 (.625)
- Place: Division: 2nd (tied with Akron Goodyear Wingfoots)
- Playoff finish: Lost to Oshkosh All-Stars in NBL Championship, 2-1
- Stats at Basketball Reference

The 1941–42 Fort Wayne Zollner Pistons season was the inaugural season of the franchise in the National Basketball League after spending their first four years as an independent works team under the Zollner Piston Company that was founded in Fort Wayne, Indiana and owned by Fred Zollner, the owner of that company and the team in question, alongside his sister, Janet. This also became the Zollner Pistons' first season where the Fort Wayne Zollner Pistons basketball works team looked to have more of a focus for the Zollner Corporation in mind over the softball team that the Zollner Corporation also had on the side as well. Fort Wayne was led by guard Bobby McDermott, who would go on to become one of the best shooters in NBL history, as well as that league's all-time leader in points scored with 3,583 points scored in 287 total NBL games played in an era without three-point shooting created. The Zollner Pistons finished the season with a record of 15 wins and 9 losses, which earned them a tie for the #2 seed in their inaugural NBL season with the Akron Goodyear Wingfoots for the 1942 NBL Playoffs. In the first round, the Zollner Pistons defeated the Akron Goodyear Wingfoots 2–1 before losing to the #1 seeded Oshkosh All-Stars 2–1 in the NBL Championship series for Fort Wayne's debut professional season.

== Roster ==
1941–42 Fort Wayne Zollner Pistons roster
Players

Pos.	No.	Player	Height	Weight	DOB	From
G/F		Curly Armstrong	5 ft 11 in (1.80 m)	170 lb (77 kg)	1918-11-01	Indiana
G		Don Beery	6 ft 0 in (1.83 m)	180 lb (82 kg)	1920-02-23	South Side HS (IN)
G		Paul Birch	6 ft 1 in (1.85 m)	190 lb (86 kg)	1910-01-04	Duquesne
F/C		Elmer Gainer	6 ft 6 in (1.98 m)	195 lb (88 kg)	1918-11-22	DePaul
G/F		Dale Hamilton	6 ft 0 in (1.83 m)	180 lb (82 kg)	1919-08-16	Franklin (IN)
G		James Hilgemann	5 ft 11 in (1.80 m)	170 lb (77 kg)	1916-12-22	Toledo
G/F		Jack Keller	6 ft 2 in (1.88 m)	185 lb (84 kg)	1922-06-22	North Side HS (IN)
G		Bobby McDermott	5 ft 11 in (1.80 m)	180 lb (82 kg)	1914-01-07	Flushing HS (NY)
G/F		Red Oberbruner	5 ft 11 in (1.80 m)	175 lb (79 kg)	1918-10-05	Notre Dame
G/F		Herm Schaefer	6 ft 0 in (1.83 m)	175 lb (79 kg)	1919-12-20	Indiana
F/C		Carlisle Towery	6 ft 4 in (1.93 m)	210 lb (95 kg)	1920-06-20	Western Kentucky

Coaches
Head coach

Carl Bennett

Legend
- (DP) Unsigned draft pick
- (FA) Free agent
- (S) Suspended
- Injured

Roster

Note: James Hilgemann was not a part of the playoff roster this season (likely due to him being enlisted in the U.S. military with World War II starting to take effect for the U.S.A. during this season).

== Regular season ==
=== Season standings ===
Pos.	League Standings	Wins	Losses	Win %
1	Oshkosh All-Stars	20	4	.833
T–2	Fort Wayne Zollner Pistons	15	9	.625
T–2	Akron Goodyear Wingfoots	15	9	.625
4	Indianapolis Kautskys	12	11	.522
5	Sheboygan Red Skins	10	14	.417
6	Chicago Bruins	8	15	.348
7	Toledo Jim White Chevrolets	3	21	.125

=== NBL Schedule ===
Not to be confused with exhibition or other non-NBL scheduled games that did not count towards Fort Wayne's official NBL record for this season.

#	Date	Opponent	Score	Record
1	December 1	Chicago	48–46	1–0
2	December 3	@ Indianapolis	51–53 (OT)	1–1
3	December 8	Akron	49–35	1–2
4	December 16	Sheboygan	50–35	2–2
5	December 22	Indianapolis	59–46	3–2
6	December 25	@ Chicago	47–38	4–2
7	December 28	@ Indianapolis	46–41	5–2
8	January 2	N Toledo	53–21	6–2
9	January 3	@ Akron	39–58	6–3
10	January 6	Oshkosh	33–41	6–4
11	January 10	@ Oshkosh	47–57	6–5
12	January 13	Toledo	60–46	7–5
13	January 19	Akron	80–74	8–5
14	January 21	@ Chicago	47–51	8–6
15	January 27	Chicago	40–41	8–7
16	January 29	@ Sheboygan	49–44 (OT)	9–7
17	February 2	Oshkosh	43–30	10–7
18	February 4	@ Toledo	59–44	11–7
19	February 7	N Akron	44–46	11–8
20	February 11	N Toledo	51–44	12–8
21	February 14	@ Oshkosh	47–72	12–9
22	February 15	@ Sheboygan	40–38	13–9
23	February 17	Indianapolis	50–46	14–9
24	February 23	Sheboygan	46–39	15–9

== NBL Playoffs ==
=== NBL Semifinals ===
(2) Fort Wayne Zollner Pistons vs. (3) Akron Goodyear Wingfoots: Fort Wayne wins series 2–1

- Game 1: February 27, 1942 @ Akron: Akron 46, Fort Wayne 30
- Game 2: March 1, 1942 @ Fort Wayne: Fort Wayne 51, Akron 48
- Game 3: March 2, 1942 @ Fort Wayne: Fort Wayne 49, Akron 43

=== NBL Championship ===
(2) Fort Wayne Zollner Pistons vs. (1) Oshkosh All-Stars: Oshkosh wins series 2–1

- Game 1: March 4, 1942 @ Fort Wayne: Fort Wayne 61, Oshkosh 43
- Game 2: March 5, 1942 @ Oshkosh: Oshkosh 68, Fort Wayne 60
- Game 3: March 6, 1942 @ Oshkosh: Oshkosh 52, Fort Wayne 46

=== Awards and honors ===
- NBL Most Valuable Player – Bobby McDermott
- First Team All-NBL – Bobby McDermott
- Second Team All-NBL – Herm Schaefer
- All-Time NBL Team – Bobby McDermott

== World Professional Basketball Tournament ==
For the second straight year in a row and their first ever year while being a representative of the NBL (they previously entered the 1941 event as an independent works team that had the players representing the local Zollner Piston Company establishment that was focused on machinery earning their spot in that event by beating the Fort Wayne Harvesters (the original Fort Wayne, Indiana representatives for the WPBT before the Zollner Pistons entered the picture) in a previous match in order to participate in the event, but got eliminated in the first round by the NBL champion Oshkosh All-Stars), the Fort Wayne Zollner Pistons would participate in the annual World Professional Basketball Tournament in Chicago, which the 1942 event was held on March 8–12, 1942 and featured 16 teams that were mostly independently ran alongside every NBL team outside of the Akron Goodyear Wingfoots due to World War II. In the first round, the Zollner Pistons saw themselves go up against the Aberdeen Army Ordnance Training Camp team (sometimes shortened up to the Aberdeen Army Center), which was an independent military team based in Aberdeen, Maryland and composed of players that were training at the Aberdeen Proving Ground during World War II, with future American Basketball League and Basketball Association of America/National Basketball Association and All-Tournament Team player Moe Becker being their leading player throughout the event. Despite the Zollner Pistons appearing to have more experience at hand due to them competing in the NBL Finals against the Oshkosh All-Stars (who would ultimately win the WPBT this year as well), they would end up being both out-poised and outplayed by the Aberdeen Army Ordnance Training Camp team, as Aberdeen ended up stunning Fort Wayne right out of the tournament with a 56–42 victory in Aberdeen's favor. The Aberdeen Army Ordnance Training Camp team would end up losing their following match to the former NBL turned independent barnstorming team known as the Detroit Eagles, who were last year's WPBT champions and reached the championship round once again despite being independent this time around, but ultimately lost to the Oshkosh All-Stars, who got their revenge for last year's defeat in the WPBT.

=== Game Played ===
- Lost first round (42–56) to the Aberdeen Army Ordnance Training Camp
