= George Glamack =

American basketball player (1919–1987)

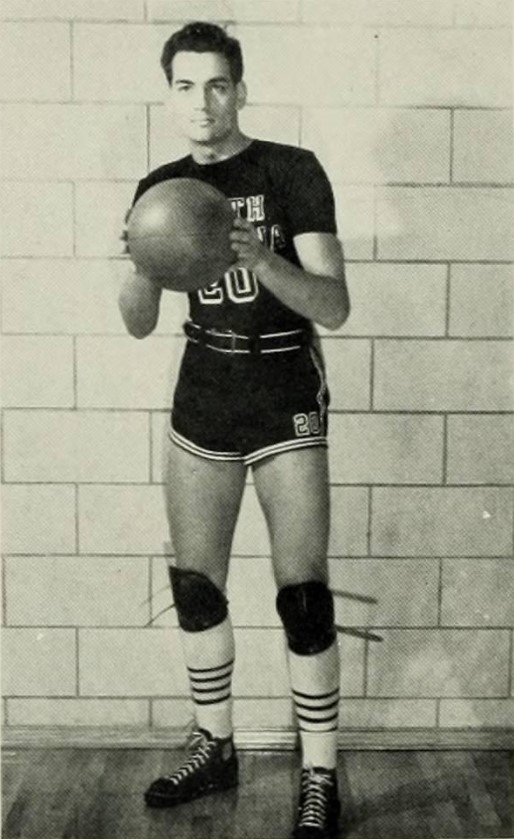
- Glamack from the 1941 The Blind Bomber

Personal information
- Born: June 7, 1918 Johnstown, Pennsylvania, U.S.
- Died: March 10, 1987 (aged 68) Buffalo, New York, U.S.
- Listed height: 6 ft 6 in (1.98 m)
- Listed weight: 225 lb (102 kg)

Career information
- High school: Johnstown (Johnstown, Pennsylvania)
- College: North Carolina (1938–1941)
- Playing career: 1941–1949
- Position: Power forward / center
- Number: 99

Career history
- 1941–1942: Akron Goodyear Wingfoots
- 1945–1947: Rochester Royals
- 1947–1948: Indianapolis Kautskys
- 1948–1949: Indianapolis Jets
- 1948–1949: Hammond Calumet Buccaneers
- 1950–1951: Grand Rapids Hornets

Career highlights
- NBL champion (1946); All-NBL First Team (1946); All-NBL Second Team (1942); NBL Rookie of the Year (1942); 2× Helms Player of the Year (1940, 1941); 2× First-team consensus All-American (1940, 1941); No. 20 retired by North Carolina Tar Heels
- Stats at NBA.com
- Stats at Basketball Reference

George Gregory Glamack (born Gjuro Gregorvitch Glamoclij, June 7, 1919 – March 10, 1987) was an American professional basketball player.

== Amateur career ==
Born in Johnstown, Pennsylvania, he was of Serbian origin. His parents were immigrants from Belgrade; his father was a mechanic in a steel mill. Glamack attended Greater Johnstown High School and Allentown Preparatory School.

A 6'6" forward-center, Glamack attended the University of North Carolina at Chapel Hill, whose basketball team was known as the White Phantoms. Glamack, an All-American in 1940 and 1941, was nicknamed the Blind Bomber because a childhood football injury had left him blind in his right eye and with blurry vision in his left, forcing him to rely on the lines drawn on the court to determine his positioning when shooting. One writer noted that "Glamack, who is ambidextrous when on the court, is also so nearsighted that the ball is merely a dim object, but apparently he never looked where he was shooting, depending upon his sense of distance and direction."

He scored 45 points against Clemson in 1941, still the fourth-highest total in UNC history. That year, he led UNC to a Southern Conference championship and the NCAA tournament. In both 1940 and 1941, he won the Helms Foundation Player of the Year, which was the only college basketball MVP award of the time. He is one of eight players to have his jersey number retired by UNC, the others being Jack Cobb, Lennie Rosenbluth, Phil Ford, James Worthy, Michael Jordan, Antawn Jamison, and Tyler Hansbrough. He scored 1,336 career points, the third-highest total in college basketball history to that point. The 31 points he scored in his final game, against Dartmouth, was the single-game record in the NCAA tournament until 1951.

== Professional career ==
Glamack entered pro basketball in 1941, playing one season for the Akron Goodyear Wingfoots of the National Basketball League, after which he was named to second-team All-NBL. He then joined the U.S. Navy for World War II. His partial blindness kept him from action overseas; during the war, he played basketball for the Great Lakes Naval Training Center. Great Lakes featured an array of former college stars, including Dick Klein, Pete Newell, George Sobek, Ed Riska, Bob Davies, Bob Dietz, Forrest Sprowl, Wilbur Schumacher, and Forddy Anderson. Under coach Tony Hinkle, Great Lakes went 34–3 in 1942–43 and 33–3 in 1943–44. While in the Navy, Glamack spent two years working for the Office of Strategic Services, the predecessor of the Central Intelligence Agency.

In 1945, he joined the NBL's Rochester Royals. Glamack scored a team high 12.3 points per game, and the team finished with a record of 24–10. The Royals won the 1946 NBL championship, defeating the Sheboygan Red Skins, 3–0, and Glamack was named first-team All-NBL. The following season, Glamack scored 8.5 points per game and the team finished with a record of 31–13, the best record in the league. The Royals returned to the NBL finals in 1947 but lost to George Mikan and the Chicago American Gears. Glamack finished his NBL career as the league's ninth-highest career scorer.

In 1948, Glamack set the NBL record for more free throws made in a game, making 20 for the Indianapolis Kautskys against the Oshkosh All-Stars.

That fall, the Kautskys moved from the NBL to the Basketball Association of America, becoming the Indianapolis Jets. But facing financial struggles, the Jets cut Glamack after only eight games, on November 25, 1948, after acquiring the less expensive John Mahnken from the Baltimore Bullets. Glamack was claimed on waivers by the Philadelphia Warriors but could not agree to a contract, so Glamack signed a contract with the NBL's Hammond Calumet Buccaneers for what would be the league's final season, 1948–49.

A few months later, Glamack sued the Jets franchise for $50,000 in unpaid salary and "damages to his business reputation." The Jets declared bankruptcy and folded shortly before the 1949 merger of the BAA and NBL that created the modern National Basketball Association. (The NBL had already committed to an expansion franchise, the Indianapolis Olympians.)

In 1950, after retiring from basketball and working as a refrigeration equipment salesman, he ran as a Republican candidate for sheriff of Marion County, Indiana, losing in the primary. But he was already working to return to the sport — this time as an owner in the National Professional Basketball League, a new circuit created for teams that had been contracted out of the new NBA. After being granted a franchise, he tried unsuccessfully to place the team in Muncie, Indiana before settling on Grand Rapids, Michigan.

Along with serving as president and general manager of the Grand Rapids Hornets, Glamack played for the team, alongside player/coach Bobby McDermott, fellow Tar Heel Fritz Nagy, the seven-footer Elmore Morgenthaler, 5'9" Ralph "Buckshot" O'Brien, Easy Parham, and two-time college All-American Blackie Towery. (He also served as head coach for nine Hornets games.) The team had lots of height for the era, with four players 6'6" or taller, but did not fare well, winning only six games against 13 losses before folding mid-season.

Glamack later worked as a beer company executive and real estate broker. He also served as an assistant coach at the Rochester Institute of Technology from 1957 to 1965. He died March 18, 1987, in Rochester, leaving two daughters and a son, the Emmy-nominated animator Marko Glamack.

== NBL career statistics ==
Legend
GP	Games played	FGM	Field goals made
FTM	Free throws made	FTA	Free throws attempted
FT%	Free throw percentage	PTS	Total points
PPG	Points per game	**Bold**	Career high

†	Denotes seasons in which Glamack's team won an NBL championship

=== Regular season ===
Year	Team	GP	FGM	FTM	PTS	PPG
1941–42	Akron	24	87	82	256	10.7
1945–46	Rochester	34	151	115	417	**12.3**
1946–47	Rochester	44	141	90	372	8.5
1947–48	Indianapolis	**57**	**215**	162	**592**	10.4
1948–49	Hammond	43	169	**163**	501	11.7
Career		202	763	612	2138	10.6

=== Playoffs ===
Year	Team	GP	FGM	FTM	PTS	PPG
1941–42	Akron	3	11	15	37	12.3
1945–46	Rochester	7	34	20	88	12.6
1946–47	Rochester	**10**	**35**	**28**	**98**	9.8
1947–48	Indianapolis	4	24	20	68	**17.0**
1948–49	Hammond	2	5	5	15	7.5
Career		26	108	88	306	11.8

== BAA career statistics ==
Legend
GP	Games played
FG%	Field-goal percentage
FT%	Free-throw percentage
APG	Assists per game
PPG	Points per game

=== Regular season ===
Year	Team	GP	FG%	FT%	APG	PPG
1948–49	Indianapolis	11	.248	.764	1.7	9.3
Career		11	.248	.764	1.7	9.3
