= 1941–42 Akron Goodyear Wingfoots season =

NBL professional basketball team season

- Head coach: Ray Detrick
- Owner: Goodyear
- Arena: Goodyear Hall; Akron Armory

Results
- Record: 15–9 (.625)
- Place: Division: T–2nd (tied with Fort Wayne Zollner Pistons)
- Playoff finish: Lost NBL Semifinals to Fort Wayne Zollner Pistons, 2–1

The 1941–42 Akron Goodyear Wingfoots season was the Goodyear Wingfoots' fifth and final year in the United States' National Basketball League (NBL), which was also the fifth year the league existed. However, if you include their previous seasons of existence as an independent team, alongside seasons where they competed in the Amateur Athletic Union, the National Industrial League (not to be confused with the National Industrial Basketball League that they would later compete in, with the Goodyear Wingfoots winning a championship in the NIL in 1932), and what were considered to be predecessors to the NBL in the National Professional Basketball League and the Midwest Basketball Conference (the latter of which the Goodyear Wingfoots won that league's final championship under that name before it folded operations and was considered to be rebranded as the NBL according to some basketball historians), this season would officially be considered their 24th season of play (though not their last season of play) as a team. For the second straight season in a row, the NBL would play their season with only seven teams without any divisional play at hand, though this season would see some new teams replacing some older NBL squads, including the return of the Indianapolis Kautskys after being a barnstorming club for a season and the introduction of the Fort Wayne Zollner Pistons, who still currently exist in the present day out in the NBA as the Detroit Pistons. This also ended up becoming the Wingfoots' first and only NBL season where they were the sole team representing Akron, Ohio in the league after the Akron Firestone Non-Skids from the rivaling Firestone Tire and Rubber Company decided to fold operations after the end of the previous season, meaning any mentions of them can directly infer to their location of Akron instead of their specific team name this time around.

The Wingfoots still played their home games at the Goodyear Hall. However, due to some financial issues that related to the growing problems of World War II further affecting the NBL season (mainly with fewer people wanting to come see their NBL games for one reason or another), the Akron squad would be forced to play some of their home games at the Akron Armory, which was the home of the nearby University of Akron, as a means to try and help fix their financial woes for this season. While they would ultimately not succeed at fixing those specific problems (seeing as how the Goodyear Wingfoots would suspend operations following this season's conclusion, only later returning in 1947 alongside former NBL member Fort Wayne General Electrics for the National Industrial Basketball League instead of returning to the NBL properly, similar to what the Indianapolis Kautskys had done this season), Akron would end up finishing this season with one of their best records in the NBL with a 15–9 record, tying the newly created Fort Wayne Zollner Pistons (now known as the Detroit Pistons of the NBA) for a second-place finish in the NBL behind the defending champion Oshkosh All-Stars. In what would later become the team's final playoff appearance in the NBL, Akron would crush the new Fort Wayne team in their first playoff match, but would ultimately lose to the Zollner Pistons two games to one in a best-of-three series, with the Zollner Pistons later being bested by the defending champion Oshkosh All-Stars two games to one in their own best-of-three series to repeat as champions of the NBL, as well as the All-Stars winning the 1942 World Professional Basketball Tournament alongside it.

This season would see George Glamack not only be named the NBL's Rookie of the Year, but also be named a member of the All-NBL Second Team as well. Not only that, but Ben Stephens would also earn All-NBL First Team honors alongside him. The Goodyear Wingfoots would end up being one of the only NBL teams to end up surviving operations following the NBL's eventual merger with the newer created Basketball Association of America to become the National Basketball Association without eventually joining the NBA itself.

== Roster ==
1941–42 Akron Goodyear Wingfoots roster
Players

Pos.	No.	Player	Height	Weight	DOB	From
G/F		Gene Anderson	6 ft 2 in (1.88 m)	190 lb (86 kg)	1917–10–05	Purdue
G		Rudy Debnar	5 ft 11 in (1.80 m)	160 lb (73 kg)	1916–05–09	Duquesne
C		Floyd Ebaugh	6 ft 7 in (2.01 m)	230 lb (104 kg)	1914–05–30	Nebraska
G/F		Harry Eich	5 ft 11 in (1.80 m)	210 lb (95 kg)	1916–01–06	Unknown
F/C		George Glamack	6 ft 6 in (1.98 m)	225 lb (102 kg)	1918–06–07	North Carolina
G		Ken Griffith	6 ft 2 in (1.88 m)	195 lb (88 kg)	1918–07–31	Alderson Broaddus
G		Lee Huber	6 ft 0 in (1.83 m)	175 lb (79 kg)	1919–02–16	Kentucky
F		Harold Hull	6 ft 4 in (1.93 m)	190 lb (86 kg)	1920–05–16	Northwest Missouri State
F		John O'Brien	6 ft 1 in (1.85 m)	210 lb (95 kg)	1916–07–25	Columbia
G/F		Bob Parsons	6 ft 1 in (1.85 m)	175 lb (79 kg)	1915–06–11	Nebraska
G/F		Ben Stephens	6 ft 0 in (1.83 m)	175 lb (79 kg)	1916–11–27	Iowa
G		Howard Vocke	6 ft 0 in (1.83 m)	190 lb (86 kg)	1915–03–16	St. John's

Coaches
Head coach
- Ray Detrick

Legend
- (DP) Unsigned draft pick
- (FA) Free agent
- (S) Suspended
- Injured

Roster

Note: Harry Eich and Lee Huber were not on Akron's playoff roster.

== Regular season ==
=== Season standings ===
Pos.	League Standings	Wins	Losses	Win %
1	Oshkosh All-Stars	20	4	.833
T–2	Fort Wayne Zollner Pistons	15	9	.625
T–2	Akron Goodyear Wingfoots	15	9	.625
4	Indianapolis Kautskys	12	11	.522
5	Sheboygan Red Skins	10	14	.417
6	Chicago Bruins	8	15	.348
7	Toledo Jim White Chevrolets	3	21	.125

=== NBL Schedule ===
Not to be confused with exhibition or other non-NBL scheduled games that did not count towards Akron's official NBL record for this season.

#	Date	Opponent	Score	Record
1	November 25	@ Oshkosh	34–37	0–1
2	November 27	@ Sheboygan	34–37	0–2
3	December 6	Indianapolis	46–30	1–2
4	December 8	@ Fort Wayne	49–35	2–2
5	December 14	@ Indianapolis	28–35	2–3
6	December 20	Oshkosh	35–42	2–4
7	December 27	Chicago	50–45	3–4
8	December 28	@ Toledo	60–39	4–4
9	December 30	Toledo	51–44	5–4
10	January 3	Fort Wayne	58–39	6–4
11	January 7	Chicago	43–34	7–4
12	January 10	Indianapolis	54–44	8–4
13	January 15	@ Sheboygan	33–42	8–5
14	January 17	@ Oshkosh	53–43	9–5
15	January 19	Fort Wayne	39–43	9–6
16	January 21	Toledo	52–36	10–6
17	January 24	Sheboygan	44–45	10–7
18	February 3	@ Chicago	48–52	10–8
19	February 7	Fort Wayne	46–44	11–8
20	February 14	Chicago	44–33	12–8
21	February 16	@ Indianapolis	39–46	12–9
22	February 21	Sheboygan	55–42	13–9
23	February 23	Toledo	51–49	14–9
24	February 25	Oshkosh	44–41	15–9

== NBL Playoffs ==
=== NBL Semifinals ===
(2/3) Akron Goodyear Wingfoots vs. (2/3) Fort Wayne Zollner Pistons: Fort Wayne win series 2–1

- Game 1: February 27, 1942 @ Akron: Akron 46, Fort Wayne 30
- Game 2: March 1, 1942 @ Fort Wayne: Fort Wayne 51, Akron 48
- Game 3: March 2, 1942 @ Fort Wayne: Fort Wayne 49, Akron 43

== Awards and honors ==
- NBL Rookie of the Year – George Glamack
- First Team All-NBL – Ben Stephens
- All-NBL Second Team – George Glamack
- All-Time NBL Team – George Glamack and Ben Stephens
