= Paul Wallace (basketball) =

American basketball player

Personal information
- Born: November 1, 1925 Philadelphia, Pennsylvania, U.S.
- Died: September 23, 1998 (aged 72) Philadelphia, Pennsylvania, U.S.

Career information
- High school: Overbrook (Philadelphia, Pennsylvania)
- College: Toledo
- Position: Guard

Career history
- 1941: Toledo Jim White Chevrolets

Paul "Hook" Wallace (November 1, 1925 – September 23, 1998) was an American professional basketball player. He played in the National Basketball League for the Toledo Jim White Chevrolets for one game during the 1941–42 season.
