= Bill Thompson (basketball) =

American basketball player

Personal information
- Born: February 21, 1920 Toledo, Ohio, U.S.
- Died: September 27, 1969 Philadelphia, Pennsylvania, U.S.
- Listed height: 6 ft 4 in (1.93 m)

Career information
- High school: St. Mary's (Mansfield, Ohio)
- College: DeSales (Ohio) (1937–1941)
- Position: Forward / guard

Career history
- 1941–1942: Toledo Jim White Chevrolets

William Thompson was an American professional basketball player. He played in the National Basketball League during the 1941–42 season and averaged 3.7 points per game.
