= Bennie Schall =

American basketball player

Personal information
- Born: December 8, 1917 Cleveland, Ohio, U.S.
- Died: February 9, 1998 (aged 80) Toledo, Ohio, U.S.
- Listed height: 5 ft 9 in (1.75 m)
- Listed weight: 165 lb (75 kg)

Career information
- High school: Woodward (Toledo, Ohio)
- College: Toledo (1936–1937)
- Position: Forward

Career history
- 1941: Toledo Jim White Chevrolets
- 1946: Toledo Jeeps

Benjamin Jack Schall (December 8, 1917 – February 9, 1998) was an American professional basketball player. He played in the National Basketball League for the Toledo Jim White Chevrolets and Toledo Jeeps. In seven career games he scored three total points.
