= Jim Rae (basketball) =

American basketball player

Personal information
- Born: October 7, 1917 Bowling Green, Ohio, U.S.
- Died: January 7, 2013 (aged 95) Traverse City, Michigan, U.S.
- Listed height: 6 ft 4 in (1.93 m)
- Listed weight: 200 lb (91 kg)

Career information
- High school: DeVilbiss (Toledo, Ohio)
- College: Michigan (1939–1940)
- Position: Center

Career history
- 1940–1941: Toledo White Huts
- 1941: Toledo Jim White Chevrolets

James Weaver Rae Jr. (October 7, 1917 – January 7, 2013) was an American professional basketball player. He played in the National Basketball League for the Toledo Jim White Chevrolets and averaged 3.3 points per game for his career.
