= Dave Williams (basketball) =

American basketball player

Personal information
- Born: February 7, 1913 Auburn, Indiana, U.S.
- Died: March 6, 1983 (aged 70) Mount Dora, Florida, U.S.
- Listed height: 6 ft 3 in (1.91 m)
- Listed weight: 210 lb (95 kg)

Career information
- College: Indianapolis (1935–1936)
- Position: Center

Career history
- 1938–1940: Indianapolis Kautskys
- 1941–1942: Toledo Jim White Chevrolets

David Boyer Williams (February 7, 1913 – March 6, 1983) was an American professional basketball player. He played in the National Basketball League for the Indianapolis Kautskys and Toledo Jim White Chevrolets. For his career he averaged 2.9 points per game.
