= Herm Schaefer =

American basketball player and coach

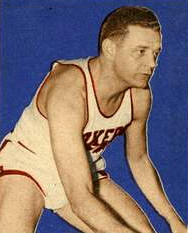
- Schaefer in 1948

Personal information
- Born: December 20, 1918 Fort Wayne, Indiana, U.S.
- Died: March 21, 1980 (aged 61) Indianapolis, Indiana, U.S.
- Listed height: 6 ft 0 in (1.83 m)
- Listed weight: 175 lb (79 kg)

Career information
- High school: Central (Fort Wayne, Indiana)
- College: Indiana (1938–1941)
- Playing career: 1941–1950
- Position: Shooting guard / small forward
- Number: 32, 7, 24, 10

Career history

Playing
- 1941–1943 1945–1946: Fort Wayne Zollner Pistons
- 1946–1947: Indianapolis Kautskys
- 1947–1950: Minneapolis Lakers

Coaching
- 1951–1953: Indianapolis Olympians

Career highlights
- 2× BAA/NBA champion (1949, 1950); NBL champion (1948); All-NBL Second Team (1942); NCAA champion (1940)
- Stats at NBA.com
- Stats at Basketball Reference

Herman Henry Schaefer (December 20, 1918 – March 21, 1980) was an American professional basketball player and coach.

A 6'0" guard/forward from Indiana University, Schaefer played in the National Basketball League and National Basketball Association from 1941 to 1950 as a member of the Fort Wayne Pistons, Indianapolis Kautskys, and Minneapolis Lakers. Schaefer later served as coach of the Indianapolis Olympians.

== Career playing statistics ==
Legend
GP	Games played	FGM	Field-goals made
FG%	Field-goal percentage	FTM	Free-throws made
FTA	Free-throws attempted	FT%	Free-throw percentage
APG	Assists per game	PTS	Points
PPG	Points per game	**Bold**	Career high

†	Denotes seasons in which Schaefer's team won an NBL championship
†	Denotes seasons in which Schaefer's team won an BAA or NBA championship

=== NBL ===
==== Regular season ====
Year	Team	GP	FGM	FTM	FTA	FT%	PTS	PPG
1941–42	Fort Wayne	24	85	37			207	**8.6**
1942–43	Fort Wayne	21	36	12			84	4.0
1945–46	Fort Wayne	15	10	3			23	1.5
1946–47	Indianapolis	44	**147**	65	**90**	.722	**359**	8.2
1947–48†	Minneapolis	**54**	108	**72**	**90**	.800	288	5.3
1947–48	Indianapolis	3	2	6	6	**1.000**	10	3.3
Career		161	388	195	186	.769	971	6.0

==== Playoffs ====
Year	Team	GP	FGM	FTM	FTA	FT%	PTS	PPG
1942	Fort Wayne	6	13	5			31	5.2
1943	Fort Wayne	5	6	3			15	3.0
1947	Indianapolis	5	22	14	18	.778	58	11.6
1948†	Minneapolis	**10**	**51**	**31**	**38**	**.816**	**133**	**13.3**
Career		26	92	53	56	.804	237	9.1

=== NBA ===
==== Regular season ====
Year	Team	GP	FG%	FT%	APG	PPG
1948–49†	Minneapolis	58	.374	.817	**3.2**	**10.4**
1949–50†	Minneapolis	**65**	**.389**	**.851**	3.1	5.1
Career		123	.379	.828	3.2	7.6

==== Playoffs ====
Year	Team	GP	FG%	FT%	APG	PPG
1949†	Minneapolis	10	**.462**	**.875**	**3.1**	**12.4**
1950†	Minneapolis	**12**	.381	.864	1.3	4.3
Career		22	.438	.870	2.1	8.0

== Head coaching record ==
Legend
Regular season	G	Games coached	W	Games won	L	Games lost	W–L %	Win–loss %
Playoffs	PG	Playoff games	PW	Playoff wins	PL	Playoff losses	PW–L %	Playoff win–loss %

=== NBA ===
Team	Year	G	W	L	W–L%	Finish	PG	PW	PL	PW–L%	Result
Indianapolis	1951–52	66	34	32	.515	3rd in Western	2	0	2	.000	Lost in NBA semifinals
Indianapolis	1952–53	71	28	43	.394	4th in Western	2	0	2	.000	Lost in NBA semifinals
Career		137	62	75	.453		4	0	4	.000	
