= Ed Sachs =

American basketball player

Personal information
- Born: February 11, 1918 Chicago, Illinois, U.S.
- Died: July 15, 1996 (aged 78) Lake Zurich, Illinois, U.S.
- Listed height: 6 ft 2 in (1.88 m)
- Listed weight: 175 lb (79 kg)

Career information
- College: DePaul (1939–1941)
- Position: Guard

Career history
- 1941–1942: Chicago Bruins

Edwin Richard Sachs (February 11, 1918 – July 15, 1996) was an American professional basketball player. He played for the Chicago Bruins in the National Basketball League during the 1941–42 season and averaged 2.5 points per game.

== Biography ==
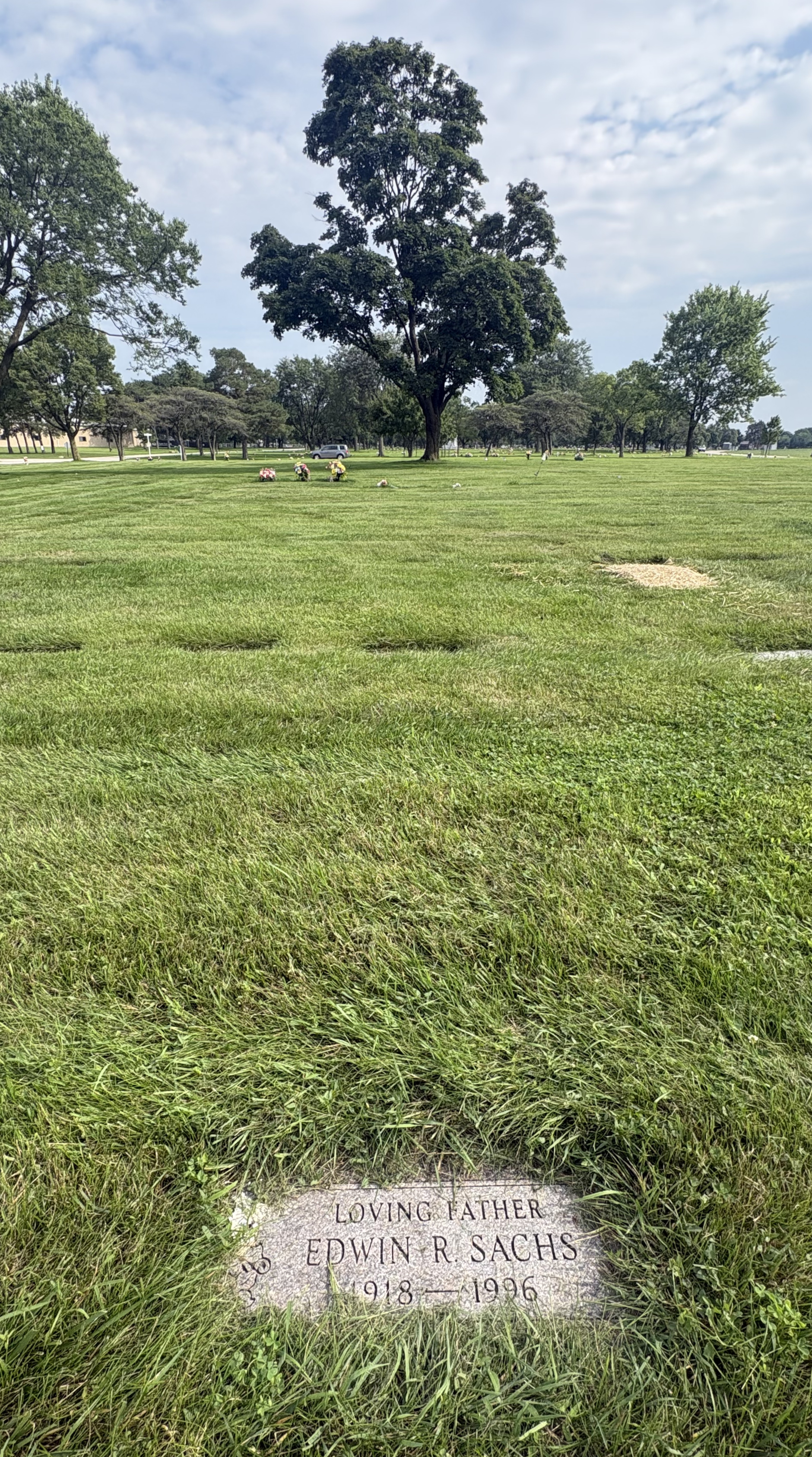
Sachs's grave at Maryhill Catholic Cemetery

Ed Sachs was born on February 11, 1918. in Chicago, to Polish immigrants Edward and Mary Sachs. He played college basketball for DePaul in the 1939–40 and 1940–41 seasons. A 6 ft 2 in (188 cm) guard, he then joined the Chicago Bruins of the National Basketball League for the 1941–42 season, averaging 2.5 points per game over eight games for a team that finished 8–15 and sixth in the league.

He died on July 15, 1996, and was buried at Maryhill Catholic Cemetery in Niles, Illinois.
