= Ed Erban =

American basketball player

Personal information
- Born: July 6, 1921 Oshkosh, Wisconsin, U.S.
- Died: May 17, 2008 (aged 86) Stillwater, Minnesota, U.S.
- Listed height: 6 ft 4 in (1.93 m)
- Listed weight: 220 lb (100 kg)

Career information
- High school: Oshkosh (Oshkosh, Wisconsin)
- College: Wisconsin–Oshkosh; Marquette
- Position: Forward / center

Career history
- 1939–1941: Oshkosh Chris Crafts
- 1941–1942: Toledo Jim White Chevrolets
- 1942–1943: Clintonville Truckers
- 1943–1946: Oshkosh All-Stars
- 1946: Syracuse Nationals

Edward Joseph Erban (July 6, 1921 – May 17, 2008) was an American professional basketball player. He played in the National Basketball League for the Toledo Jim White Chevrolets, Oshkosh All-Stars, and Syracuse Nationals. For his career he averaged 2.1 points per game.
