= Herm Witasek =

American basketball player

Personal information
- Born: October 16, 1913 Lankin, North Dakota, U.S.
- Died: July 25, 1963 (aged 49) Oshkosh, Wisconsin, U.S.
- Listed height: 6 ft 2 in (1.88 m)
- Listed weight: 210 lb (95 kg)

Career information
- High school: Lankin (Lankin, North Dakota)
- College: North Dakota (1932–1935)
- Position: Guard / forward

Career history
- 1937–1942: Oshkosh All-Stars

Career highlights
- NBL champion (1941)

Herman J. Witasek (October 16, 1913 – July 25, 1963) was an American professional basketball player. He played for the Oshkosh All-Stars in the National Basketball League (NBL) from 1937 to 1942 and averaged 5.1 points per game. He won the NBL championships in 1941 but was not on the All-Stars playoffs roster in 1942 when they won a second championship.
