= Gran Edwards =

American basketball player

Personal information
- Born: 1920
- Died: 1996 (aged 75–76)
- Listed weight: 185 lb (84 kg)

Career information
- College: Western Colorado
- Position: Center

Career history
- 1942: Toledo Jim White Chevrolets

Thomas Granville "Gran" Edwards (1920–1996) was an American professional basketball player. He played in the National Basketball League for the Toledo Jim White Chevrolets in three games during the 1941–42 season and averaged 1.7 points per game.
