= Tommy Edwards (basketball) =

American basketball player

Personal information
- Born: January 14, 1911 Ohio, U.S.
- Died: March 14, 1977 (aged 66) Toledo, Ohio, U.S.
- Listed height: 5 ft 10 in (1.78 m)
- Listed weight: 170 lb (77 kg)

Career information
- High school: Woodward (Toledo, Ohio)
- Position: Forward

Career history
- 1940–1941: Toledo Collegians
- 1940–1941: Toledo White Huts
- 1941: Toledo Jim White Chevrolets

Thomas Carl Edwards Jr. (January 14, 1911 – March 14, 1977) was an American professional basketball player. He played in the National Basketball League for the Toledo Jim White Chevrolets in one game during the 1941–42 season and scored one point. He was also the head coach for the Toledo Jim White Chevrolets in the 1941-42 NBL season.
