= Paul Maki =

American basketball player (1918–1974)

Personal information
- Born: February 1, 1918 Aurora, Minnesota
- Died: September 4, 1974 (aged 56) Sheboygan, Wisconsin
- Listed height: 6 ft 1 in (1.85 m)
- Listed weight: 175 lb (79 kg)

Career information
- High school: Aurora (Aurora, Minnesota)
- College: Minnesota (1936–1939)
- Position: Guard

Career history
- 1940–1941: Bismarck
- 1941–1942: Sheboygan Red Skins

Paul Emil Maki (February 1, 1918 – September 4, 1974) was an American professional basketball player. He played in the National Basketball League for the Sheboygan Red Skins during the 1941–42 season and averaged 4.4 points per game.
