= George Morse (basketball) =

American basketball player

Personal information
- Born: April 11, 1920 Chicago, Illinois, U.S.
- Died: December 6, 2012 (aged 92) Chicago, Illinois, U.S.
- Listed height: 6 ft 1 in (1.85 m)

Career information
- High school: Mount Carmel (Chicago, Illinois)
- Playing career: 1938–1949
- Position: Small forward / shooting guard

Career history
- 1938–1941: Chicago Duffy Florals
- 1941: Chicago Bruins
- 1946–1949: Chicago Shamrocks

George Edward Morse (April 11, 1920 – December 6, 2012) was an American professional basketball player. He played in the National Basketball League for the Chicago Bruins in two games and averaged 1.0 points per game. He attended Marquette University on an athletics scholarship but left after his freshman year to concentrate on his professional career.
