= Don Beery =

American basketball player (1920–2016)

Personal information
- Born: February 23, 1920 Fort Wayne, Indiana, U.S.
- Died: April 2, 2016 (aged 96) Tucson, Arizona, U.S.
- Listed height: 6 ft 0 in (1.83 m)
- Listed weight: 180 lb (82 kg)

Career information
- High school: South Side (Fort Wayne, Indiana)
- Position: Guard

Career history
- 1940–1941: Fort Wayne
- 1941–1942: Fort Wayne Zollner Pistons

Donald Patterson Beery (February 23, 1920 – April 2, 2016) was an American professional basketball player. He played for the Fort Wayne Zollner Pistons in the National Basketball League during the 1941–42 season and averaged 0.7 points per game.

He served in the Army during World War II and earned the Silver Star with arrowhead, Bronze Star, and the Purple Heart with 2 Oak Clusters.
