= Wilbur Schumacher =

American basketball player

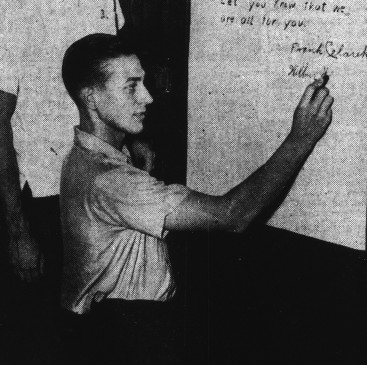
- Schumacher, circa 1941

Personal information
- Born: March 6, 1920 Louisville, Kentucky, U.S.
- Died: September 3, 1971 (aged 51) Indianapolis, Indiana, U.S.
- Listed height: 5 ft 11 in (1.80 m)
- Listed weight: 150 lb (68 kg)

Career information
- High school: Male (Louisville, Kentucky)
- College: Butler (1939–1942)
- Position: Forward

Career history
- 1945: Indianapolis Kautskys

Wilbur Harold Schumacher (March 6, 1920 – September 3, 1971) was an American professional basketball player. He played for the Indianapolis Kautskys in the National Basketball League for five games during the 1945–46 season and averaged 2.0 points per game.
