= Mark Ertel =

American basketball player

Personal information
- Born: February 26, 1919 Tipton, Indiana, U.S.
- Died: March 1, 2010 (aged 91) Indianapolis, Indiana, U.S.
- Listed height: 6 ft 4 in (1.93 m)
- Listed weight: 196 lb (89 kg)

Career information
- High school: Tipton (Tipton, Indiana)
- College: Notre Dame (1937–1940)
- Position: Forward / center

Career history
- 1941–1942: Indianapolis Kautskys

Mark Anthony Ertel (February 26, 1919 – March 1, 2010) was an American professional basketball player. He played in the National Basketball League for the Indianapolis Kautskys during the 1941–42 season and averaged 3.3 points per game. He also fought in World War II and spent his corporate career as a lifelong employee of Perfect Circle, a U.S. manufacturer of piston rings (the company is now part of Mahle GmbH).
