= Al Alvarez (basketball) =

Argentine basketball player (1912–1995)

Personal information
- Born: October 5, 1912 Buenos Aires, Argentina
- Died: March 17, 1995 (aged 82) Toledo, Ohio, U.S.
- Listed height: 6 ft 0 in (1.83 m)
- Listed weight: 160 lb (73 kg)

Career information
- High school: Garfield (Akron, Ohio)
- College: Toledo (1936–1939)
- Position: Guard

Career history

Playing
- 1941: Toledo Jim White Chevrolets

Coaching
- 1945–1946: Bellevue HS (assistant)
- 1946–1950: Whitmer HS

Armando "Al" Alvarez (October 5, 1912 – March 17, 1995) was an Argentine professional basketball player. He played in the United States' National Basketball League for the Toledo Jim White Chevrolets in four games during the 1941–42 season averaged 5.3 points per game.
