= Bob Dietz =

American basketball player and coach

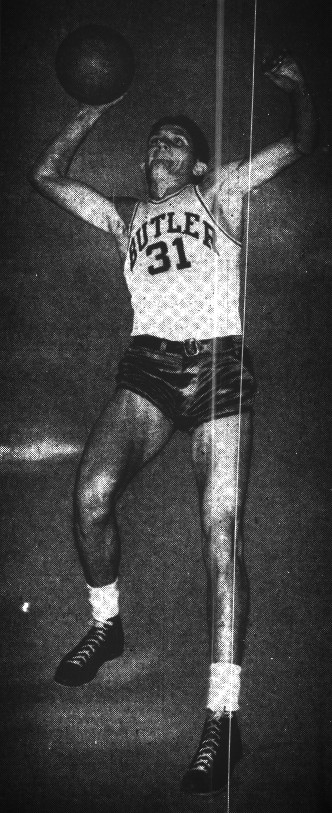
- Dietz, circa 1940

Personal information
- Born: December 4, 1917 Indianapolis, Indiana, U.S.
- Died: May 4, 1999 (aged 81) Carmel, Indiana, U.S.
- Listed height: 6 ft 1 in (1.85 m)
- Listed weight: 164 lb (74 kg)

Career information
- High school: Washington (Indianapolis, Indiana)
- College: Butler (1938–1941)
- Position: Guard / forward

Career history

Playing
- 1936–1937: Lawrenceville Trojans
- 1940–1941: Crawfordsville Merchants
- 1941–1942, 1945–1948: Indianapolis Kautskys
- 1950–1955: Indianapolis

Coaching
- 1946–1947: Indianapolis Kautskys
- 1946–1965: Butler (assistant)

Robert Edward Dietz (December 4, 1917 – May 4, 1999) was an American professional basketball player. He played in the National Basketball League for the Indianapolis Kautskys for four seasons and averaged 4.6 points per game for his career. He served as a player-coach during the 1946–47 season.

Dietz served in the Navy during World War II. Aside from his playing career, he also coached Butler University's men's basketball and tennis teams, serving as an assistant in basketball and the head coach for tennis.
