= Eddie Riska =

American basketball player

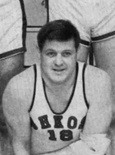
- Riska in 1948

Personal information
- Born: October 4, 1919 Chicago, Illinois, U.S.
- Died: August 3, 1992 (aged 72) Houston, Texas, U.S.
- Listed height: 6 ft 0 in (1.83 m)
- Listed weight: 175 lb (79 kg)

Career information
- High school: De La Salle Institute (Chicago, Illinois)
- College: Notre Dame (1938–1941)
- Playing career: 1941–1949
- Position: Shooting guard / small forward

Career history

Playing
- 1941–1942 1945–1949: Oshkosh All-Stars

Coaching
- 1949: Oshkosh All-Stars (interim HC)

Career highlights
- NBL champion (1942); First-team All-American – MSG (1940); Third-team All-American – Converse (1941)

Edward Joseph Riska Sr. (October 4, 1919 – August 3, 1992) was an American basketball player. He was an All-American college player at Notre Dame and played several years in the National Basketball League (NBL) of the United States. Riska was the MVP during the World Professional Basketball Tournament in 1942.

Riska played five seasons for the Oshkosh All-Stars of the NBL, averaging 4.1 points over 152 games. After the close of his professional career, he became a high school coach for De La Salle Institute in Chicago, his alma mater.
