= 1942 World Professional Basketball Tournament =

World Professional Basketball Tournament
- 1942

Tournament information
- Location: Chicago, Illinois
- Dates: 8 March–12 March
- Venue: International Amphitheater
- Teams: 16

Final positions
- Champions: Oshkosh All-Stars
- 1st runner-up: Detroit Eagles
- 2nd runner-up: Long Island Grumman Flyers

Tournament statistics
- MVP: Ed Riska
- Top scorer: Gene Englund

The 1942 World Professional Basketball Tournament was the fourth edition of the World Professional Basketball Tournament. It was held in Chicago, Illinois, during the days of 8–12 March 1942 and featured 16 teams, with the teams mostly being independently run teams that also competed alongside six teams that were around in the National Basketball League at the time because of World War II. The NBL's champions that year, the Oshkosh All-Stars, had their route to the championship occur by beating independently ran teams like the Davenport Central Turner Rockets, the New York Renaissance, and the Harlem Globetrotters. However, the other half of the tournament had the most impressive team involve the Long Island Grumman Flyers (which was composed of star players from the American Basketball League, New York Renaissance, and even Harlem Globetrotters working at the Grumman Aircraft Company (who specialized as a war industry defense plant that wasn't subjected to military call-ups) in Long Island, New York) reaching the semifinal round before losing 44–43 in overtime to the defending WPBT champion Detroit Eagles (which had since demoted itself into a barnstorming team after winning last year's WPBT championship). The WPBT championship this year was won by the NBL champion Oshkosh All-Stars (being the first professional champion team to win multiple championships in the same season), who got their revenge for last year and defeated the NBL turned barnstorming Detroit Eagles 43–41 in the championship game because hobbled veteran Leroy Edwards scored five quick points off the bench late in the game for Oshkosh. This was the first and only time in tournament history that the championship round was a rematch of the previous tournament's championship. The All-Stars' players were given a prize of gold watches for winning the tournament. The Long Island Grumman Flyers came in third after beating the Harlem Globetrotters 43–41 themselves in the third-place game. Ed Riska of the Oshkosh All-Stars was named the tournament's Most Valuable Player. Gene Englund led all scorers with 54 points, while Riska came second with 50.

== Results ==
=== Bracket ===
Round 1
Davenport Central Turner Rockets	29
Oshkosh All-Stars	44
New York Renaissance	55
Michigan City Steelers	37
Harlem Globetrotters	40
Hagerstown Conoco Oilers	33
Sheboygan Red Skins	34
Columbus Bobb Chevrolets	26
Detroit Eagles	46
Toledo White Huts	29
Aberdeen Army Ordnance Training Center	56
Fort Wayne Zollner Pistons	42
Long Island Grumman Flyers	54
Indianapolis Kautskys	32
Chicago Bruins	56
Detroit AAA	46

Quarterfinals
Oshkosh All-Stars	44
New York Renaissance	38
Harlem Globetrotters	37
Sheboygan Red Skins	32
Detroit Eagles	40
Aberdeen Army Ordnance Training Center	34
Long Island Grumman Flyers	48
Chicago Bruins	38

Semifinals
Oshkosh All-Stars	48
Harlem Globetrotters	41
Detroit Eagles	44
Long Island Grumman Flyers	43

Final
Oshkosh All-Stars	43
Detroit Eagles	41
Third place
Harlem Globetrotters	41
Long Island Grumman Flyers	43

=== Third place game ===
12 March 1942

Box score

Long Island Grumman Flyers 43, Harlem Globetrotters 41
Scoring by half: 24–16, 19–25
Pts: D. King – 16	Pts: T. Strong – 11

International Amphitheater
Attendance: 11,500
Referees: Enright, Messinger

=== Championship game ===
12 March 1942

Box score and recap

Oshkosh All-Stars 43, Detroit Eagles 41
Scoring by half: 20–12, 23–29
Pts: G. Englund – 17	Pts: B. Jeannette – 14

International Amphitheater
Attendance: 11,500
Referees: Kennedy, Kriznecky

== Individual awards ==
Gene Englund of the Oshkosh All-Stars led this tournament in scoring with 52 points scored in four games played. In addition to that, Sonny Boswell of the New York Renaissance would score a record-high 32 points against the Michigan City Steelers (who might sometimes be referred to as the Northern Indiana Steelers or even just the Indiana Steelers), which would later be tied by Bob Tough in 1944 and wouldn't be broken until 1948.

=== All-Tournament Team ===
The WPBT initially listed an All-Tournament Team of ten players for this event at the time of its conclusion. However, following future years where they added a first team and second team, the WPBT would modify this All-Tournament Team to list out who was a first team member and who was a second team member for this particular year (which ultimately became the only time the WPBT would do such a thing throughout their history). The listing below features all ten of the original players showcased for the original All-Tournament Team, with the first and second team listings being officially revised versions done by the Chicago Herald American, the official organizers of the tournament, for future versions done in later years.

==== All-Tournament First Team ====
- F – Ed Riska, Oshkosh All-Stars (MVP)
- F – Dolly King, Long Island Grumman Flyers
- C – Gene Englund, Oshkosh All-Stars
- G – Jerry Bush, Detroit Eagles
- G – Buddy Jeannette, Detroit Eagles

==== All-Tournament Second Team ====
- F – Moe Becker, Aberdeen Army Ordnance Training Center
- F – Sonny Boswell, New York Renaissance
- C – Bernie Price, Harlem Globetrotters
- G – Ed Milkovich, Hagerstown Conoco Oilers
- G – Mickey Tierney, Chicago Bruins

== See also ==
- 1941–42 National Basketball League (United States) season, a professional basketball season featuring six of the competing teams there (with one of them competing under a different team name for the NBL's sake), including the defending NBL champions (and eventual WPBT champions) in the Oshkosh All-Stars
