= World Professional Basketball Tournament =

Invitational tournament, 1939–1948

- Sport: Basketball
- Founded: 1939
- Folded: 1948
- Country: United States
- Most titles: Fort Wayne Zollner Pistons (3 titles)

The World Professional Basketball Tournament was an annual invitational tournament held in Chicago from 1939 to 1948 and sponsored by the Chicago Herald American. Many teams came from the National Basketball League, but it also included the best teams from other leagues and the best independent barnstorming teams such as the New York Renaissance and Harlem Globetrotters. Games for the WPBT were played at various sites within the city of Chicago, including the Chicago Coliseum, the International Amphitheater, and the Chicago Stadium.

The NBL champion usually won this tournament, with three exceptions: the New York Renaissance won the first WPBT in 1939, while the Harlem Globetrotters—a strongly competitive squad in those days—won the following year. In 1943, the Washington Bears (with many New York Renaissance players on their roster) won the tournament. The NBL's Fort Wayne Zollner Pistons won the most titles (three, from 1944 to 1946), while the NBL's Oshkosh All-Stars made the most finals appearances with five, winning only once (in 1942).

The last tournament was held in 1948, with the Minneapolis Lakers defeating the New York Renaissance 75–71 in the tournament final. The following year, The Indianapolis News attempted to hold a similar tournament, inviting the Wilkes-Barre Barons from the American Basketball League, three teams each from the Basketball Association of America and the National Basketball League, and one team that would remain unidentified until shortly before the seeded draw (though it was suggested the eighth team was to be the Montgomery Rebels, the regular season champions of the Southern Professional Basketball League). Although the National Basketball League agreed to attend, the tournament did not come to fruition after the BAA declined the invitation. Months after the cancellation of the 1949 WPBT in Indianapolis occurred, the NBL and BAA would officially merge operations to create the present-day National Basketball Association, which served as the official end to the tournament's existence for good since the NBA would take on the initial purpose the WPBT had at the time.

In addition to the World Professional Basketball Tournament in the spring, the Chicago Herald American also hosted what would originally be considered a companion event to the WPBT in the College All-Star Classic in the fall, though it later separated itself from the WPBT to become its own thing, with the College All-Star Classic operating from 1940 until 1954. For the first eight years of the College All-Star Classic, the winners of the WPBT (or in the case of fall 1941, the runners-up of the WPBT due to the actual champions of the event that year not having a proper home venue to play in that season) would be pitted up against the players that were considered to be the elite seniors of college basketball from each year (the titular College All-Stars in question) that were selected from a poll of sports writers and coaches, with the College All-Stars team being housed and fed by Northwestern University and ordinarily being coached by a Big Ten Conference head coach like Dutch Lonborg from Northwestern University, Doug Mills from the University of Illinois, or Ray Meyer from DePaul University, with the players keeping special uniforms and sweat suits made for the event alongside medallioned wrist watches as mementos for the event in question. From that period of time, it was considered a curtain raiser to begin a new professional basketball season during those periods of time. However, once the WPBT went defunct, the College All-Star Classic would instead occur with the team that won the NBA Finals as the new equivalent of the WPBT champion for those later years, as noted by the College All-Stars going up against the Minneapolis Lakers in 1949 and 1950 (though only known records are shown to go as far back as 1950). There would also be a spiritual successor program related to it called the World Series of Basketball Tour that the Harlem Globetrotters created in 1950 that lasted from 1950 until 1962 (though the original end of it was held in 1958 due to the Pan American Games affecting the years 1959 and 1960, with known results being shown once again for its return in 1961 and 1962 (though no known MVPs for both the Harlem Globetrotters and the College All-Americans players being confirmed in 1962) before the event was confirmed to be defunct for good by 1963), where the Globetrotters competed against a team of College All-Americans selected by a poll from college coaches (similar to the past College All-Stars) in a multi-game series that ultimately ended with the Globetrotters winning over the College All-Americans every year that had been recorded there (with the closest time the College All-Americans upset the Harlem Globetrotters in a yearly series being in 1956 through a close 11–10 series, while the final year's event had Harlem winning every game outside of one game there for an overall 147–64 record by the Globetrotters there).

== Tournament finals results ==
- 1939 - New York Renaissance 34–25 Oshkosh All-Stars
- 1940 - Harlem Globetrotters 31–29 Chicago Bruins
- 1941 - Detroit Eagles 39–37 Oshkosh All-Stars
- 1942 - Oshkosh All-Stars 43–41 Detroit Eagles
- 1943 - Washington Bears 43–31 Oshkosh All-Stars
- 1944 - Fort Wayne Zollner Pistons 50–33 Brooklyn Eagles
- 1945 - Fort Wayne Zollner Pistons 78–52 Dayton Acmes
- 1946 - Fort Wayne Zollner Pistons 73–57 Oshkosh All-Stars
- 1947 - Indianapolis Kautskys 62–47 Toledo Jeeps
- 1948 - Minneapolis Lakers 75–71 New York Renaissance

== Tournament MVPs ==
- 1939 - Puggy Bell, New York Renaissance
- 1940 - Sonny Boswell, Harlem Globetrotters
- 1941 - Buddy Jeannette, Detroit Eagles
- 1942 - Ed Riska, Oshkosh All-Stars
- 1943 - Curly Armstrong, Fort Wayne Zollner Pistons
- 1944 - Bobby McDermott, Fort Wayne Zollner Pistons
- 1945 - Buddy Jeannette, Fort Wayne Zollner Pistons
- 1946 - George Mikan, Chicago American Gears
- 1947 - Jule Rivlin, Toledo Jeeps
- 1948 - George Mikan, Minneapolis Lakers

== All-time championship game scoring records ==
*	Elected to the Naismith Memorial Basketball Hall of Fame

Player	Team	Games	Pts	PPG
Leroy Edwards	Oshkosh	5	53	10.6
Bobby McDermott	Ft. Wayne	3	49	16.3
Jake Pelkington	Det/Ft. W	4	45	11.2
Buddy Jeannette	Det/Ft. W	4	42	10.5
George Mikan	Minneapolis	1	40	40
Pop Gates	NY/Wash	3	37	12.3
Ed Sadowski	Det/Ft. W	3	34	11.3
Jerry Bush	Det/Ft. W	5	30	6.0
Nat Clifton	NY	1	24	24.0
Gene Englund	Oshkosh	3	22	7.3
Chick Reiser	Ft. Wayne	3	22	7.3
Bob Tough	Bkn/Ft. W	2	21	10.5
Duke Cumberland	Harlem/NY	2	20	10.0
Jake Ahearn	Detroit	2	20	10.0
George Sobek	Toledo	1	20	20.0

== All-time World Tournament team records ==
Team	App.	Gms	W	L	1st	2nd
Oshkosh All-Stars	9	30	20	10	1	4
New York Renaissance-Washington Bears	10	28	18	10	2	1
Fort Wayne Zollner Pistons	8	21	15	6	3	0
Harlem Globetrotters	7	20	13	7	1	0
Detroit Eagles	3	10	8	2	1	1
Chicago American Gears	2	9	7	2	0	0
Chicago Bruins-Ramblers	4	9	5	4	0	1
Toledo White Huts-Whites-Jeeps	4	10	5	5	0	1
Sheboygan Redskins	8	14	5	9	0	0
Anderson Chiefs-Duffey Packers	3	7	4	3	0	0
Minneapolis Lakers	1	3	3	0	1	0
Brooklyn Eagles	1	4	3	1	0	1
Long Island Grumman Flyers/Hellcats	2	5	3	2	0	0
Dayton Dive Bombers-Aviators-Acmes-Mickeys	4	9	5	4	0	1
Midland Dow Chemicals	3	6	3	3	0	0
Indianapolis Kautskys	5	7	3	4	1	0
Washington Heurich Brewers	1	3	2	1	0	0
Tri-Cities Blackhawks	2	5	2	3	0	0
Baltimore Bullets	2	6	2	4	0	0

- Twenty-seven teams entered the tournament in various years but did not win a game; eight teams had one win.
- The New York Celtics played in the initial tournament in 1939, but lost their only game. Another well-known team, the Philadelphia Sphas, had a win and a loss in their only appearance, in 1941 .

== Recap by year ==
=== 1939 ===
- 1st Place: New York Renaissance 34- Oshkosh All-Stars 25
- MVP- Puggy Bell (New York Renaissance)
- Leading Championship Game Scorers:
- Pop Gates (New York Renaissance) 12
- Leroy Edwards (Oshkosh All-Stars) 12
- 3rd Place: Harlem Globetrotters 36- Sheboygan Red Skins 33
- 5th Place: New York Yankees, Chicago Harmons, New York Celtics
- 8th Place: Fort Wayne Harvesters, Brenton Harbor House of David, Illinois Grads, Clarksburg Oilers

=== 1940 ===
- 1st Place: Harlem Globetrotters 31- Chicago Bruins 29
- MVP- Sonny Boswell (Harlem Globetrotters)
- Leading Championship Game Scorers:
- Sonny Boswell (Harlem Globetrotters) 12
- Mike Novak (Chicago Bruins) 7
- 3rd Place: Washington Heurich Brewers 41- Syracuse Reds 30
- 5th Place: Sheboygan Red Skins, Waterloo Wonders, Oshkosh All-Stars, New York Renaissance
- 9th Place: Fort Wayne Harvesters, Rochester Seagrams, Kenosha Royals, Canton Bulldogs, Benton Harbor House of David, Clarksburg Oilers

=== 1941 ===
- 1st Place: Detroit Eagles 39- Oshkosh All-Stars 37
- MVP- Buddy Jeannette (Detroit Eagles)
- Leading Championship Game Scorers:
- Ed Sadowski (Detroit Eagles) 11
- Bob Carpenter (Oshkosh All-Stars) 8
- 3rd Place: New York Renaissance 57- Toledo White Huts 42
- 5th Place: Chicago Bruins, Kenosha Royals, Harlem Globetrotters, Philadelphia Sphas
- 9th Place: Davenport Central Turner Rockets, Indianapolis Kautskys, Newark Elks, Fort Wayne Zollner Pistons, Dayton Sucher Wonders, Rochester Seagrams, Sheboygan Red Skins, Bismark Phantoms

=== 1942 ===
- 1st Place: Oshkosh All-Stars 43- Detroit Eagles 41
- MVP- Ed Riska (Oshkosh All-Stars)
- Leading Championship Game Scorers:
- Gene Englund (Oshkosh All-Stars) 17
- Buddy Jeannette (Detroit Eagles ) 14
- 3rd Place: Long Island Grumman Flyers 43- Harlem Globetrotters 41
- 5th Place: Aberdeen Army Ordnance Training Center, Sheboygan Red Skins, Chicago Bruins, New York Renaissance
- 9th Place: Detroit A.A.A., Columbus Bobb Chevrolets, Northern Indiana Steelers, Davenport Central Turner Rockets, Toledo White Huts, Hagerstown Conoco Oilers, Indianapolis Kautskys, Fort Wayne Zollner Pistons

=== 1943 ===
- 1st Place: Washington, D.C. Bears 43- Oshkosh All-Stars 31
- MVP- Curly Armstrong (Fort Wayne Zollner Pistons)
- Leading Championship Game Scorers:
- Johnny Isaacs (Washington, D.C. Bears) 11
- Leroy Edwards (Oshkosh All-Stars) 7
- 3rd Place: Fort Wayne Zollner Pistons 58- Dayton Dive Bombers 52
- 5th Place: Detroit Eagles, Sheboygan Red Skins, Harlem Globetrotters, Minneapolis Sparklers
- 9th Place: Akron Collegians, Indianapolis Pure Oils, Chicago Ramblers, South Bend Studebaker Champions

=== 1944 ===
- 1st Place: Fort Wayne Zollner Pistons 50- Brooklyn Eagles 33
- MVP- Bobby McDermott (Fort Wayne Zollner Pistons)
- Leading Championship Game Scorers:
- Jake Pellington (Fort Wayne Zollner Pistons) 19
- Bob Tough & Bernie Opper (Brooklyn Eagles) 11
- 3rd Place: Harlem Globetrotters 37- New York Renaissance 29
- 5th Place: Dayton Aviators, Cleveland Chase Brassmen, Sheboygan Red Skins, Oshkosh All-Stars
- 9th Place: Akron Collegians, Camp Campbell Tankmen, Detroit Suffrins, Indianapolis Pure Oils, Rochester Wings, Pittsburgh Corbetts

=== 1945 ===
- 1st Place: Fort Wayne Zollner Pistons 78- Dayton Acmes 52
- MVP- Buddy Jeannette (Fort Wayne Zollner Pistons)
- Leading Championship Game Scorers:
- Buddy Jeannette (Fort Wayne Zollner Pistons) 18
- John Mahnken (Dayton Acmes) 16
- 3rd Place: Chicago American Gears 64- New York Renaissance 55
- 5th Place: Oshkosh All-Stars, Pittsburgh Raiders, Midland Dow Chemicals, Harlem Globetrotters
- 9th Place: Hartford Nutmegs, Detroit Mansfields, Indianapolis Oilers, Cleveland Allmen Transfers, Newark C-O Twos, Long Island Grumman Hellcats

=== 1946 ===
- 1st Place: Fort Wayne Zollner Pistons 73- Oshkosh All-Stars 57
- Fort Wayne Zollner Pistons 56- Oshkosh All-Stars 47
- Oshkosh All-Stars 61- Ft. Wayne Zollner Pistons 59
- (Fort Wayne Zollner Pistons wins series 2 games to 1)
- MVP- George Mikan (Chicago American Gears)
- All-First team: Bobby McDermott, Bob Feerick, Jerry Bush, Leroy Edwards, George Mikan
- All-Second team: Paul Cloyd, Bob Calihan, Mike Bloom, Stanley Stutz, Bob Carpenter
- Leading Championship Game Scorers:
- Bobby McDermott (Fort Wayne Zollner Pistons) 20
- Leroy Edwards (Oshkosh All-Stars) 24
- 3rd Place: Chicago American Gears 65- Baltimore Bullets 50
- Chicago American Gears 59- Baltimore Bullets 54
- (Chicago American Gears wins series 2 games to none)
- 5th Place: New York Renaissance, Sheboygan Red Skins, Midland Dow Chemicals, Anderson Chiefs
- 9th Place: Pittsburgh Raiders, Cleveland Allmen Transfers, Indianapolis Kautskys, Detroit Mansfields, Toledo Whites, Dayton Mickeys

=== 1947 ===
- 1st Place: Indianapolis Kautskys 62- Toledo Jeeps 47
- MVP- Jule Rivlin (Toledo Jeeps)
- Leading Championship Game Scorers:
- Leo Klier (Indianapolis Kautskys) 12
- George Sobek (Toledo Jeeps) 20
- 3rd Place: Fort Wayne Zollner Pistons 86- Oshkosh All-Stars 67
- 5th Place: Sheboygan Red Skins, Tri-Cities Blackhawks, Anderson Duffey Packers, Midland Dows
- 9th Place: Herkimer Mohawk Redskins, Pittsburgh Pirates, Syracuse Nationals, Portland Indians, New York Renaissance, Baltimore Bullets

=== 1948 ===
- 1st Place: Minneapolis Lakers 75- New York Renaissance 71
- MVP- George Mikan (Minneapolis Lakers)
- Leading Championship Game Scorers:
- George Mikan (Minneapolis Lakers) 40
- Sweetwater Clifton (New York Renaissance) 24
- 3rd Place: Anderson Duffey Packers 66- Tri-Cities Blackhawks 44
- 5th Place: Bridgeport Newfield Steelers, Fort Wayne Zollner Pistons, Indianapolis Kautskys, Wilkes-Barre Barons
