= Toledo Jim White Chevrolets =

American basketball team

Toledo White Huts / Jim White Chevrolets
- Founded: 1940
- Folded: 1942; 1943; 1946
- History: Toledo White Huts; 1940–1943; 1946; Toledo Jim White Chevrolets; 1941–1942 (NBL)
- Arena: Toledo Civic Auditorium; The Field House?
- Capacity: 3,600
- Location: Toledo, Ohio, U.S.
- Ownership: Jim White (1941–1942); Sidney Goldberg (1940–1943(; 1946?)); Virgil Gladieux (1946)
- Championships: none

The Toledo Jim White Chevrolets were an American basketball team that played professionally in the National Basketball League (NBL) for one full season and one partial season from 1941 to 1942 (though would continue existing for a couple of years afterward under a different team name in the Toledo White Huts at various points in time, weirdly enough). The team is best known for a second NBL stint held by Chuck Chuckovits, who would lead the league in scoring that season despite the Toledo franchise having the worst record during their only full season in the NBL. They would also be known for being one of the first professional basketball teams to embrace racial integration before it would become fully accepted into the sport, with them not only integrating multiple African American players, but also a Latin American player onto their roster at various points in their existence as well. However, they would also be known for being one of the worst teams in the NBL's entire existence, winning only three games in their entire existence (all at home for a deceptively promising start to their first season of play), with one of their victories coming on the day of the Attack of Pearl Harbor and another victory only coming from forfeiture against the Chicago Bruins days later, who would coincidentally win against Toledo that same season via forfeiture later that same season themselves. It's suggested that they would later be a returning NBL franchise in 1946 under different primary ownership, playing as the Toledo Jeeps instead.

== History ==
Their first confirmed point of existence would occur on January 26, 1941, which was a doubleheader exhibition series to fundraise against infant paralysis alongside celebrating President Franklin Delano Roosevelt's birthday that featured the all-black New York Renaissance and the American Basketball League's Philadelphia Sphas as the first game and the Akron Firestone Non-Skids against the local Toledo White Huts as the second game. Even back then, the White Huts would compete with having players being racially integrated within their roster, though they would still lose their game against Akron that night. They would later notably exist as one of the multiple independently ran franchises that competed in the 1941 version of the World Professional Basketball Tournament, which was first implemented back in 1939 as a way to decide who would be seen as the best basketball team in the nation at the time after dealing with what could be considered the "Wild West" era of professional basketball. Unlike most other professional basketball teams from the time, however, the Toledo White Huts, which they had first started competing under through the promotion of boxing and basketball team promoter Sidney Goldberg through the local White Huts hamburger chain restaurant at the time, were considered a ragtag team that was paid $125 by the team's promoters themselves in order to enter the WPBT in question, with $20 of Goldberg's own money being paid to acquire jerseys from the University of Toledo's basketball team for his team to use with his own amateur team's shorts alongside borrowed shorts from the Rochester Seagrams after they were eliminated from the first round of the event. Despite being considered a likely first round exit due to the slapdash situation the team had to go through, the White Huts squad would end up upsetting not just one, but two of the NBL's four teams that were competing in the competition that year, defeating the Sheboygan Red Skins in the first round and then the Chicago Bruins in the quarterfinal round due to the leadership performances of former NBL player Chuck Chuckovits (who led all scorers in the tournament with 82 points scored in four games played) before being eliminated in the semifinal round by the new NBL champion Oshkosh All-Stars (who eventually lost the WPBT that year to the last remaining NBL team that year in the Detroit Eagles) and then losing the third place consolation prize round to the all-black New York Renaissance squad.

Despite what would normally be seen as a disappointing conclusion in such a tournament, the surprising performances that they had throughout the event after previously being seen as easy fodder beforehand led to the NBL wanting to promote Goldberg's franchise into being a professional franchise entirely. While Goldberg would pay the initial $350 necessary at the time to apply his team into the NBL, when the league added in an additional $1,500 payment at hand in order to cover for any potential forfeits at hand (which surprisingly would come into play for them both for and against themselves), he was considered to be out of luck at the time. However, a local car salesman named Jim White would help save the business transfer by not only covering the necessary costs at hand, but also providing the team some proper basketball uniforms to wear for a team basis throughout the season and two station wagons to use for travelling throughout the midwest during the season. This would not only lead to the team rebranding themselves into being named the Toledo Jim White Chevrolets as a way to help honor what Jim White had done to help save the team's entry into the NBL while also promoting his local Chevrolet car dealership (with a unique stipulation being utilized for exhibition games and things like the World Professional Basketball Tournament where in games that won't utilize NBL competition for one reason or another, they can be allowed to return to the original Toledo White Huts name again), but would also help the team out in being seen as a more serious franchise by this point in time, with the NBL also being helped out in the short-term as well by sustaining the same amount of seven teams as they had the previous season with a different cast of teams involved this time around despite the looming threat of World War II coming closer to them.

During their first season in the NBL, the Jim White Chevrolets had what could be seen as a deceptively promising start to their season, as they would enter it with what would later be seen as their absolute best 3–1 start to the season, with their only three victories (all at home) that season coming on December 7, 1941 with the Attack on Pearl Harbor being announced through the loud speaker in the home stadium during the game (with the Jim White Chevrolets winning 42–40 over the Indianapolis Kautskys), a forfeited victory against the Chicago Bruins on December 10, and a 41–34 victory on December 14 against the Sheboygan Red Skins after first losing to the Kautskys on the road on November 30. However, when the Jim White Chevrolets forfeited their own match to the Bruins on December 22, they would enter a massive losing streak that later resulted in them going into a massive 3–21 record for last place for one of the worst records in NBL history. Despite the massive failure (some of which could be attributed to their home court having slippery terrazzo flooring instead of wood flooring, which resulted in players having shinsplits from running on that floor), Chuck Chuckovits would end up becoming the leading scorer for the season and being a member of the All-NBL First Team that season. Even then, the effects of World War II led to Sidney Goldberg asking the NBL to allow his team (and other teams like his) to add African American players and other races to enter the league due to concerns relating to risks involving players entering the war, which they ultimately approved of. This led to the Jim White Chevrolets not only being the first professional basketball team to implement African American players into that league (outside of a brief moment when the NBL began its existence as the Midwest Basketball Conference, though African Americans would first exist in professional basketball leagues by as early as 1904), but also became the first team to utilize a Latin American player onto their roster as well.

The greater effects of World War II would cause the team to be undermanned for their second season, leading to them utilizing more African American players onto their roster like they did for their first season (though they'd be joined by another (newer) team this season in the Chicago Studebaker Flyers this time around). While Toledo's black players weren't getting the same kind of remarks that Jackie Robinson first got when playing in Major League Baseball, Goldberg would still note of the racial discrimination that had been going on in that second season's road streak they had while they were in Oshkosh, Wisconsin due to them not only being unable to get hamburgers at a local hamburger place there (with Goldberg having to get the hamburgers for his players there), but also noting that the black players couldn't even sleep at the hotel they were staying in (with them being forced to sleep in the team's car instead, with Goldberg feeling like he needed to sleep with them there despite him having a room to sleep in that night), only being thankful that Sheboygan was better to them by comparison. Despite those early issues, however, it would be the financial struggles (which didn't help with them not playing a game at home by this point in time for their season) combined with roster problems that caused the team to fold operations after losing their first four games of the season (all of which being on the road against each of the remaining four teams playing that season in the new Chicago Studebaker Flyers, the Fort Wayne Zollner Pistons, the two-time NBL champion Oshkosh All-Stars, and the Sheboygan Red Skins) on December 14, 1942 (one day after their last game played against Sheboygan). Weirdly enough, despite them folding operations in the NBL, the team would return to play as the Toledo White Huts in a mid-season tournament held in Memphis, Tennessee that featured three of the four remaining NBL teams as well in the Fort Wayne Zollner Pistons, Oshkosh All-Stars, and Sheboygan Red Skins, though that tournament unsurprisingly ended with them finishing in last place without any money earned in their favor due to them first losing 56–35 in a blowout loss to Oshkosh and then losing 52–44 to Fort Wayne. Interestingly, after a three-year hiatus, the team would return to compete in the 1946 World Professional Basketball Tournament (albeit with some sources claiming they competed under the Toledo Whites name instead of their original Toledo White Huts name) with Virgil Gladieux from Willys-Overland Jeep Plant being considered the new primary owner for the team under Sidney Goldberg instead of Jim White this time around, though they still would not have the same kind of success there that was first held back in 1941. Despite not matching that same success, however, it's suggested that the team would still take on one of the open spots for the NBL in the 1946–47 NBL season to become the Toledo Jeeps instead of playing as either the Toledo Jim White Chevrolets or another team name altogether instead.
