= Oshkosh All-Stars =

Former professional basketball team

- Leagues: NBL
- Founded: 1929
- Dissolved: 1951
- History: Oshkosh All-Stars 1929–1951
- Arena: South Park School Gymnasium
- Capacity: 2,000
- Location: Oshkosh, Wisconsin
- Championships: 2 National Basketball League Championships (1941, 1942); 1 World Professional Basketball Tournament (1942)

The Oshkosh All-Stars were an American professional basketball team based in Oshkosh, Wisconsin. Founded in 1929 by Lonnie Darling, the team was a member of the National Basketball League, a forerunner to the NBA, from 1937 until 1949.

== History ==
The team began as a barnstorming team, playing loosely structured games against other Wisconsin-based teams. It did not belong to a league.

Arthur Heywood, sports editor of the Oshkosh Daily Northwestern, thought Oshkosh should have a professional basketball team to give people something to talk about over the winter months. Heywood took the idea to Lonnie Darling, a seed distributor and salesman for the G. H. Hunkel Co. Although Darling had never played a game of basketball in his life, he agreed to set up a team, and recruited 30 talented local players to try out.

The team had no set roster, and players could switch allegiances from night to night. Players could make from $15 to $25 per game and played almost every day of the week. The All-Stars played their games at the Recreation Gym to crowds of 800 to 1,200 people.

The rules of the game made it impossible for high scoring. After every basket, the ball went back to mid-court for a center jump, and the clock continued non-stop. Fans wanted to see action, so the officials let players scramble and hit each other without much interference. Fan involvement was direct; when a questionable call was made or an opposing player made a nasty move, fans would storm onto the court in an angry mob. In this time, there were designated shooters so that the same player would shoot for every free throw.

=== National Basketball League ===
The all-white Oshkosh All-Stars played the all-black New York Renaissance Big Five (Rens) for the first time in February 1936 in a two-game series. The series drew such a large crowd that team manager Darling decided to play the Rens again in 1937 in a five-game series. The games were held in Oshkosh, Racine, Green Bay, Ripon, and Madison, Wisconsin. Darling declared that the winner of the series would be considered the world's champions of basketball.

The All-Stars lost the series, three games to two, but Robert Douglas, the Ren's owner, agreed to playing an additional two-game series that would extend the "World Series of Basketball" to seven games. If the All-Stars won those two games, they would be considered the world's basketball champions, winning four games to three. The All-Stars defeated the Rens in both games. The following season the NBL added Oshkosh as a founding member.

The team was a part of the NBL for 12 years, starting in 1937 and ending in 1949. During this time, the All-Stars made it to the playoffs 11 of the 12 years, appeared in the NBL championship five consecutive years (1938–1942), and won the NBL Championship twice (with the league's championship being named the "Shaughnessy Trophy" at the time) in 1941 and 1942. The All-Stars also won the 1942 World Professional Basketball Tournament, defeating the Detroit Eagles in the final.

=== Conclusion ===
By the late 1940s, after a few losing seasons, including one season where they missed the NBL Playoffs entirely, the All-Stars were still known as a winning team, and Oshkosh was widely known as a "basketball city" in the state of Wisconsin, similar to how Green Bay is considered to be a "football city" there.

On May 10, 1948, the Oshkosh All-Stars joined the Fort Wayne Zollner Pistons, Indianapolis Kautskys, Minneapolis Lakers, Rochester Royals, and Toledo Jeeps in an early attempt to switch from the NBL to the Basketball Association of America (BAA), though like the Jeeps, the All-Stars failed to switch leagues that year and joined the aborted BAA Buffalo team and cities of Louisville, Kentucky and Wilkes-Barre, Pennsylvania as failed teams and locations to have teams enter the BAA that year. In 1949, the NBL merged with the Basketball Association of America (BAA), forming the National Basketball Association. Darling proposed a move to either Green Bay or Milwaukee, but he was told that he had not met the deadline to enter the NBA. However, it was suggested that they were agreed to enter the NBA all along out into Milwaukee (presumably to merge with a local independent team in Milwaukee team called the "Shooting Stars"), but Darling and the other owners ended up getting cold feet in relation to their likely move out to Milwaukee instead. In any case, the players planned to join the newly created franchise would have included Gene Berce, Jack Burmaster, Gene Englund, Alex Hannum, Marshall Hawkins, Walt Lautenbach, Bob Mulvihill, Glen Selbo, and Floyd Volker; instead, those players alongside others that Oshkosh had the player rights to at the time were entered into a dispersal draft system of sorts held by the newly-established NBA at the time. Had the Oshkosh franchise managed to successfully integrate themselves into the newly created NBA from the two merged leagues, the planned idea in mind for the 1949–50 NBA season would have had the 18 teams from the NBL & BAA representing just the Eastern & Western Divisions of the time (as opposed to something like a National Division and an American Division akin to Major League Baseball where the National Division would be teams planned to be from the intended 1949–50 NBL season and the American Division would be teams planned to be from the intended 1949–50 BAA season) and would have had the old BAA teams play each other six times for 54 games and then play one home game and one road game against the now-former NBL squads for a total of 16 games at hand for a schedule of 70 overall games played, while the now-former NBL teams played each other seven times and then have a home game and a road game against the old BAA teams for a total of 69 games played on their ends for an unbalanced, yet workable NBA schedule. Instead, the early loss of the Oshkosh franchise meant that the All-Stars franchise would end up being forced to play in the minor league Wisconsin State Basketball League for the 1949–50 season, while the NBA had to work out its first merged season between the NBL & BAA with a completely unbalanced three division format that both saw the Western Division hold only five teams that season and the Central Division temporarily become a thing that season with six teams there alongside the Eastern Division before later, necessary expansions by the NBA required the Central Division to hold a necessary rebirth on its end by 1970 alongside the Midwest Division being a thing by then up until 2004 following the creation of the Charlotte Bobcats (now the revived Charlotte Hornets).

Funnily enough, after the first official season under the NBA name was completed properly with the full 17 teams playing its very unbalanced schedule (with teams playing either 62, 64, or 68 games instead of the originally planned 69 or 70 games) and playoff formatting (the NBA's semifinals that year had two of the division champions competing against each other, while the third one had an automatic bye by default for the 1950 NBA Finals, though that team in question didn't win the NBA Finals that year), four of the later six NBA teams to drop out of newly-merged league that season (the Anderson Packers, the original Denver Nuggets, the Sheboygan Red Skins, and the Waterloo Hawks) would ask for Lon Darling to bring back the Oshkosh All-Stars team for professional play in a newly established professional basketball league that they created in order to try and rival the NBA called the National Professional Basketball League. However, because the new league was completely uncertain on whether Darling's team was still going to play in Oshkosh or was going to move to Milwaukee by the time they were truly ready to return to professional play, the NPBL decided to hold Darling's operating expenses of $4,000 in escrow for one year before allowing his team to enter the league properly, with Oshkosh (presumably) playing their final season in the Wisconsin State Basketball League once again after spending their season outside of the NBL to be in the WSBL. However, the NPBL would go into absolute disarray the more it played along before it folded operations after only one season of play, thus voiding the last chance for the All-Stars to play professionally ever again. With that being said, even if the NPBL had managed to survive their inaugural season and managed to play for a second season, Darling would end up dying from heart failure on April 19, 1951, which led to the team dissolving operations entirely after what could be considered two final, independent seasons of play for Oshkosh.

Leroy Edwards holds the team's scoring record with 3,221 career points, followed by Gene Englund with 2,600 points. Edwards was given the Most Valuable Player award by the NBL for three consecutive seasons (1937–1939). Englund played the 1949–1950 season in the NBA, then retired from professional play entirely.

== Record ==
Season	W	L	W/L%	Finish	Playoffs
1937–38^{*}	12	2	.857	1	Lost NBL championship series to Akron Goodyear Wingfoots
1938–39^{*}	17	11	.607	1	Lost NBL championship series to Akron Firestone Non-Skids
1939–40^{*}	15	13	.536	1	Lost NBL championship series to Akron Firestone Non-Skids
1940–41^{*}	18	6	.750	1	Won NBL championship series over Sheboygan Red Skins
1941–42^{*}	20	4	.833	1	Won NBL championship series over Fort Wayne Zollner Pistons
1942–43^{*}	11	12	.478	3	Lost NBL semifinals to Sheboygan Red Skins
1943–44^{*}	7	15	.318	3	Lost NBL semifinals to Sheboygan Red Skins
1944–45	12	18	.400	3	Did not qualify
1945–46^{*}	19	15	.559	2	Lost Western division semifinals to Sheboygan Red Skins
1946–47^{*}	28	16	.636	1	Lost Western division semifinals to Chicago American Gears
1947–48^{*}	29	31	.483	3	Lost Western division opening round to Minneapols Lakers
1948–49^{*}	37	27	.587	1	Lost NBL championship series to Anderson Duffey Packers

^* indicates a playoff appearance

== Images ==
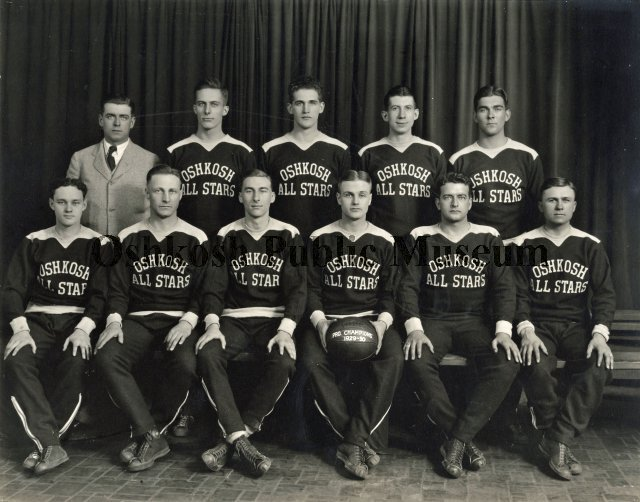
First season: 1929-1930 Oshkosh All-Stars

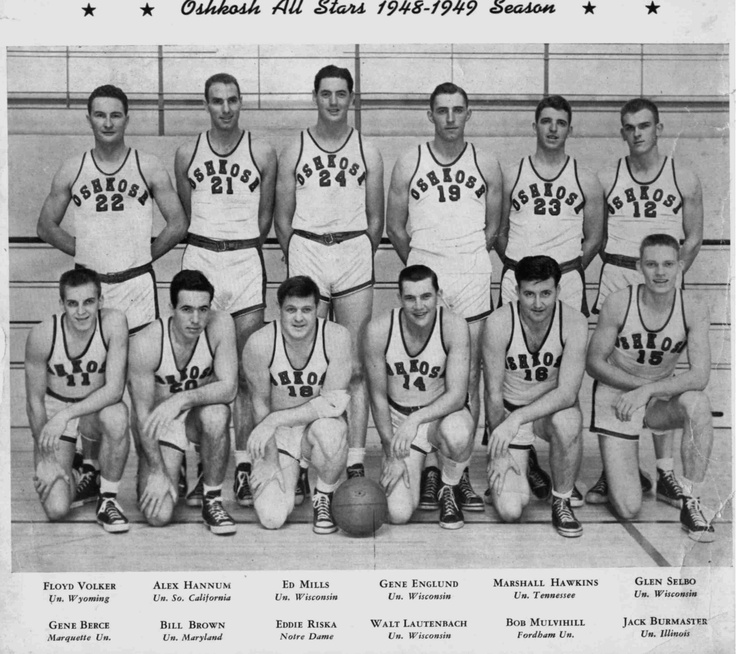
Final season: 1948-1949 Oshkosh All-Stars
