= 1939–40 Akron Firestone Non-Skids season =

NBL professional basketball team season

- NBL champions
- Division champions
- Head coach: Paul Sheeks
- Owner: Firestone
- Arena: Firestone Clubhouse

Results
- Record: 19–9 (.679)
- Place: Division: 1st (Eastern)
- Playoff finish: NBL champions (Won 3–2 over Oshkosh All-Stars)

The 1939–40 Akron Firestone Non-Skids season was the Akron Firestone Non–Skids' third year in the United States' National Basketball League (NBL), which was also the third year the league existed. However, if one were to include their previous seasons of play in both precursors of sorts to the NBL in the National Professional Basketball League and the Midwest Basketball Conference alongside the couple of independent seasons of play they had before officially entering the NBL, this would officially be their eighth season of play instead. Eight teams competed in the NBL, comprising four teams each in the Eastern and Western Divisions. The Non–Skids were one of two teams from Akron, Ohio in the league, the other being the Akron Goodyear Wingfoots.

The Non–Skids played their home games at the Firestone Clubhouse. For the second season in a row, the Non-Skids finished the season with a league best record (19–9) and won the Eastern Division. They then went on to repeat as NBL champions, once again topping the Western Division's Oshkosh All-Stars three games to two in a best-of-five series, for the second consecutive season.

Head coach Paul Sheeks repeated as the league's Coach of the Year Award. Players Soup Cable (First Team) and Jack Ozburn (Second Team) earned All-NBL honors for the second straight season as well.

== Roster ==
1939–40 Akron Firestone Non-Skids roster
Players

| Pos. | No. | Player | Height | Weight | DOB | From |
|---|---|---|---|---|---|---|
| F/C | 15 | Jerry Bush | 6 ft 3 in (1.91 m) | 200 lb (91 kg) | 1914–09–06 | St. John's |
| G | | Soup Cable | 6 ft 3 in (1.91 m) | 200 lb (91 kg) | 1913–04–04 | West HS (OH) |
| G | 8 | Bob Hassmiller | 6 ft 1 in (1.85 m) | 185 lb (84 kg) | 1916–12–17 | Fordham |
| F | | John Moir | 6 ft 2 in (1.88 m) | 184 lb (83 kg) | 1915–05–22 | Notre Dame |
| C | 26 | Paul Nowak | 6 ft 5 in (1.96 m) | 210 lb (95 kg) | 1914–03–14 | Notre Dame |
| G/F | | Tommy O'Brien | 5 ft 8 in (1.73 m) | 165 lb (75 kg) | 1916–02–16 | George Washington |
| G/F | | Jack Ozburn | 6 ft 1 in (1.85 m) | 175 lb (79 kg) | 1913–01–04 | Monmouth (IL) |
| F/C | | Harry Sorensen | 6 ft 4 in (1.93 m) | 200 lb (91 kg) | 1914–03–27 | Nebraska |
| F/C | 16 | Irving Terjesen | 6 ft 3 in (1.91 m) | 195 lb (88 kg) | 1915–03–04 | NYU |
| G | | Paul Tobin | 5 ft 9 in (1.75 m) | 170 lb (77 kg) | 1909–11–23 | West HS (OH) |
| G | 3 | Tom Wukovits | 5 ft 11 in (1.80 m) | 165 lb (75 kg) | 1916–02–04 | Notre Dame |

Coaches
Head coach
- Paul Sheeks

Legend
- (DP) Unsigned draft pick
- (FA) Free agent
- (S) Suspended
- Injured

Roster

== Regular season ==
=== Season standings ===
| Pos. | Eastern Division | Wins | Losses | Win % |
|---|---|---|---|---|
| 1 | Akron Firestone Non-Skids | 19 | 9 | .679 |
| 2 | Detroit Eagles | 17 | 11 | .607 |
| 3 | Akron Goodyear Wingfoots | 14 | 14 | .500 |
| 4 | Indianapolis Kautskys | 9 | 19 | .321 |

=== NBL Schedule ===
Not to be confused with exhibition or other non-NBL scheduled games that did not count towards Akron's official NBL record for this season. An official database created by John Grasso detailing every NBL match possible (outside of two matches that the Kankakee Gallagher Trojans won over the Dayton Metropolitans in 1938) would be released in 2026 showcasing every team's official schedules throughout their time spent in the NBL. As such, these are the official results recorded for the Akron Firestone Non-Skids during their third season in the NBL under that name for the league.

- December 6, 1939 @ Indianapolis, IN: Akron Firestone Non-Skids 33, Indianapolis Kautskys 39
- December 7, 1939 @ Sheboygan, WI: Akron Firestone Non-Skids 40, Sheboygan Red Skins 41
- December 9, 1939 @ Oshkosh, WI: Akron Firestone Non-Skids 49, Oshkosh All-Stars 42
- December 10, 1939 @ Hammond, IN: Akron Firestone Non-Skids 47, Hammond Ciesar All-Americans 52
- December 17, 1939 @ Akron, OH: Sheboygan Red Skins 38, Akron Firestone Non-Skids 42
- December 19, 1939 @ Detroit, MI: Akron Firestone Non-Skids 35, Detroit Eagles 34
- December 20, 1939 @ Chicago, IL: Akron Firestone Non-Skids 29, Chicago Bruins 31
- December 23, 1939 @ Akron, OH: Detroit Eagles 36, Akron Firestone Non-Skids 41
- December 28, 1939 @ Akron, OH: Chicago Bruins 38, Akron Firestone Non-Skids 48
- January 7, 1940 @ Akron, OH: Indianapolis Kautskys 55, Akron Firestone Non-Skids 63
- January 10, 1940 @ Akron, OH: Oshkosh All-Stars 49, Akron Firestone Non-Skids 47
- January 13, 1940 @ Akron, OH: Akron Firestone Non-Skids 47, Akron Goodyear Wingfoots 37
- January 17, 1940 @ Akron, OH: Hammond Ciesar All-Americans 46, Akron Firestone Non-Skids 62
- January 21, 1940 @ Akron, OH: Indianapolis Kautskys 52, Akron Firestone Non-Skids 46
- January 24, 1940 @ Akron, OH: Sheboygan Red Skins 38, Akron Firestone Non-Skids 59
- January 27, 1940 @ Akron, OH: Akron Firestone Non-Skids 39, Akron Goodyear Wingfoots 38
- February 3, 1940 @ Akron, OH: Chicago Bruins 40, Akron Firestone Non-Skids 34
- February 6, 1940 @ Detroit, MI: Akron Firestone Non-Skids 28, Detroit Eagles 42
- February 7, 1940 @ Chicago, IL: Akron Firestone Non-Skids 39, Chicago Bruins 33
- February 10, 1940 @ Akron, OH: Akron Firestone Non-Skids 46, Akron Goodyear Wingfoots 32
- February 21, 1940 @ Kokomo, IN: Akron Firestone Non-Skids 53, Indianapolis Kautskys 50
- February 22, 1940 @ Akron, OH: Hammond Ciesar All-Americans 46, Akron Firestone Non-Skids 50
- February 24, 1940 @ Akron, OH: Akron Firestone Non-Skids 46, Akron Goodyear Wingfoots 36
- February 26, 1940 @ Akron, OH: Oshkosh All-Stars 39, Akron Firestone Non-Skids 41
- February 29, 1940 @ Akron, OH: Sheboygan Red Skins 32, Akron Firestone Non-Skids 42
- March 2, 1940 @ Oshkosh, WI: Akron Firestone Non-Skids 41, Oshkosh All-Stars 46
- March 3, 1940 @ Hammond, IN: Akron Firestone Non-Skids 45, Hammond Ciesar All-Americans 39
- March 6, 1940 @ Akron, OH: Detroit Eagles 35, Akron Firestone Non-Skids 48 (Was also both teams' first Eastern Division Playoff game against each other for this season, which was weirdly the only time the NBL allowed for both teams' final regular season games to also count as their first playoff game against each other.)

== NBL Playoffs ==
=== NBL Eastern Division Playoff ===
(1E) Akron Firestone Non-Skids vs. (2E) Detroit Eagles: Akron wins series 2–1

- Game 1: March 6, 1940 @ Akron: Akron 48, Detroit 35 (Was also both teams' final regular season games for this season, which was weirdly the only time the NBL allowed for both teams' final regular season games to also count as their first playoff game against each other.)
- Game 2: March 8, 1940 @ Detroit: Detroit 49, Akron 37
- Game 3: March 9, 1940 @ Akron: Akron 46, Detroit 35

=== NBL Championship ===
(E1) Akron Firestone Non-Skids vs. (W1) Oshkosh All-Stars: Akron wins series 3–2

- Game 1: March 10, 1940 @ Oshkosh: Oshkosh 47, Akron 37
- Game 2: March 11, 1940 @ Oshkosh: Oshkosh 60, Akron 46
- Game 3: March 14, 1940 @ Akron: Akron 35, Oshkosh 32
- Game 4: March 15, 1940 @ Akron: Akron 41, Oshkosh 40
- Game 5: March 16, 1940 vs. Akron: Akron 61, Oshkosh 60 → game played at Wills Gymnasium in Kent, Ohio

== Awards and honors ==
- NBL Coach of the Year – Paul Sheeks
- First Team All-NBL – Soup Cable
- Second Team All-NBL – Jack Ozburn
- All-Time NBL Team – Jerry Bush
