= 1940–41 Akron Firestone Non-Skids season =

NBL professional basketball team season

- Head coach: Paul Sheeks
- Owner: Firestone
- Arena: Firestone Clubhouse

Results
- Record: 13–11 (.542)
- Place: Division: T–2nd (tied with Sheboygan Red Skins)
- Playoff finish: Lost NBL Semifinals to the Oshkosh All-Stars, 2–0

The 1940–41 Akron Firestone Non-Skids season was the Firestone Non–Skids' fourth and final year in the United States' National Basketball League (NBL), which was also the fourth year the league existed. However, if one were to include their previous seasons of play in both precursors of sorts to the NBL in the National Professional Basketball League and the Midwest Basketball Conference alongside the couple of independent seasons of play they had before officially entering the NBL, this would officially be (at least) their ninth and final season of play instead. This season would see seven teams compete in the NBL, with the league removing divisions entirely this season when they first thought the Detroit Eagles weren't going to play in the NBL this season alongside the Indianapolis Kautskys due to venue issues at the time. The Non–Skids were one of two teams from Akron, Ohio in the league this season, with the other team being the Akron Goodyear Wingfoots.

The Non–Skids played their home games at Firestone Clubhouse. However, despite the effects of the Great Depression finally starting to fade for the general public, the Firestone Non-Skids were starting to have some trouble trying to fill up their Firestone Clubhouse for home games when they were struggling to succeed early on in their season, to the point where they looked like they were going to miss the NBL Playoffs entirely this season. However, despite them having a poor start early on with a 1–6 record and even appearing to be out of the running for a playoff spot by the start of February with a 7–10 record, the Firestone Non-Skids would end up surprising the rest of the NBL with a 13–11 record to finish their season with a tie for second place alongside the Sheboygan Red Skins. However, due to them losing a coin flip for playoff positioning, they ended up getting a worst position for themselves by going up against the first place NBL defending champion Oshkosh All-Stars in the semifinal round, which Oshkosh disposed of easily with a 2–0 sweep in the playoffs, with Oshkosh later being the new champions of the NBL in their place. This season would end up becoming the franchise's worst season throughout the franchise's entire professional history despite it still resulting in a winning record and a playoff spot on their ends. Following this season's conclusion, the Firestone Non-Skids would end up folding operations and leaving the NBL altogether, with it occurring months before the U.S.A. would officially enter World War II.

Jack Ozburn would earn All-NBL First Team honors for the first and only season in his entire playing career after previously earning Second Team honors in his first three seasons in the NBL due to his work in turning around the Firestone Non-Skids' season after it looked like it was going to be a complete disappointment for them early on.

== Roster ==
1940–41 Akron Firestone Non-Skids roster
Players

Pos.	No.	Player	Height	Weight	DOB	From
G		Fred Beretta	5 ft 11 in (1.80 m)	160 lb (73 kg)	1917–01–24	Purdue
F/C		Jerry Bush	6 ft 3 in (1.91 m)	200 lb (91 kg)	1914–09–06	St. John's
G		Soup Cable	6 ft 3 in (1.91 m)	200 lb (91 kg)	1913–04–04	West HS (OH)
G		Paul DuCharme	5 ft 11 in (1.80 m)	160 lb (73 kg)	1917–08–27	Notre Dame
G		Bob Hassmiller	6 ft 1 in (1.85 m)	185 lb (84 kg)	1916–12–17	Fordham
F/C		John Jennings	6 ft 6 in (1.98 m)	195 lb (88 kg)	1918–04–02	Washington State
F		John Moir	6 ft 2 in (1.88 m)	184 lb (83 kg)	1915–05–22	Notre Dame
C		Paul Nowak	6 ft 5 in (1.96 m)	210 lb (95 kg)	1914–03–14	Notre Dame
G/F		Tommy O'Brien	5 ft 8 in (1.73 m)	165 lb (75 kg)	1916–02–16	George Washington
G/F		Jack Ozburn	6 ft 1 in (1.85 m)	175 lb (79 kg)	1913–01–04	Monmouth (IL)
F/C		Harry Sorensen	6 ft 4 in (1.93 m)	200 lb (91 kg)	1914–03–27	Nebraska
F/C		Irving Terjesen	6 ft 3 in (1.91 m)	195 lb (88 kg)	1915–03–04	NYU
G		Tom Wukovits	5 ft 11 in (1.80 m)	165 lb (75 kg)	1916–02–04	Notre Dame

Coaches
Head coach
- Paul Sheeks

Legend
- (DP) Unsigned draft pick
- (FA) Free agent
- (S) Suspended
- Injured

Roster

== Regular season ==
=== Season standings ===
Pos.	League Standings	Wins	Losses	Win %
1	Oshkosh All-Stars	18	6	.750
T–2	Sheboygan Red Skins	13	11	.542
T–2	Akron Firestone Non-Skids	13	11	.542
4	Detroit Eagles	12	12	.500
T–5	Chicago Bruins	11	13	.458
T–5	Akron Goodyear Wingfoots	11	13	.458
7	Hammond Ciesar All-Americans	6	18	.250

=== NBL Schedule ===
Not to be confused with exhibition or other non-NBL scheduled games that did not count towards Akron's official NBL record for this season. An official database created by John Grasso detailing every NBL match possible (outside of two matches that the Kankakee Gallagher Trojans won over the Dayton Metropolitans in 1938) would be released in 2026 showcasing every team's official schedules throughout their time spent in the NBL. As such, these are the official results recorded for the Akron Firestone Non-Skids during their fourth and final season in the NBL under that name for the league.

- December 4, 1940 @ Detroit, MI: Akron Firestone Non-Skids 41, Detroit Eagles 35
- December 6, 1940: Sheboygan Red Skins 43, Akron Firestone Non-Skids 41 (OT @ Akron, OH)
- December 8, 1940 @ Hammond, IN: Akron Firestone Non-Skids 34, Hammond Ciesar All-Americans 37
- December 13, 1940 @ Akron, OH: Detroit Eagles 34, Akron Firestone Non-Skids 33
- December 16, 1940 @ Akron, OH: Oshkosh All-Stars 37, Akron Firestone Non-Skids 32
- December 18, 1940 @ Chicago, IL: Akron Firestone Non-Skids 36, Chicago Bruins 44
- December 23, 1940 @ Akron, OH: Akron Goodyear Wingfoots 47, Akron Firestone Non-Skids 33
- December 27, 1940 @ Akron, OH: Chicago Bruins 45, Akron Firestone Non-Skids 46
- January 3, 1941 @ Detroit, MI: Detroit Eagles 52, Akron Firestone Non-Skids 42
- January 7, 1941 @ Akron, OH: Akron Firestone Non-Skids 44, Akron Goodyear Wingfoots 38
- January 12, 1941 @ Akron, OH: Detroit Eagles 42, Akron Firestone Non-Skids 48
- January 16, 1941 @ Sheboygan, WI: Akron Firestone Non-Skids 34, Sheboygan Red Skins 36
- January 18, 1941 @ Oshkosh, WI: Akron Firestone Non-Skids 43, Oshkosh All-Stars 45
- January 21, 1941 @ Akron, OH: Hammond Ciesar All-Americans 41, Akron Firestone Non-Skids 45
- January 25, 1941 @ Akron, OH: Akron Goodyear Wingfoots 32, Akron Firestone Non-Skids 29
- January 28, 1941 @ Akron, OH: Oshkosh All-Stars 48, Akron Firestone Non-Skids 58
- February 5, 1941 @ Akron, OH: Sheboygan Red Skins 46, Akron Firestone Non-Skids 54
- February 9, 1941 @ Hammond, IN: Akron Firestone Non-Skids 38, Hammond Ciesar All-Americans 41
- February 12, 1941 @ Chicago, IL: Akron Firestone Non-Skids 46, Chicago Bruins 37
- February 13, 1941 @ Sheboygan, WI: Akron Firestone Non-Skids 48, Sheboygan Red Skins 42
- February 15, 1941 @ Oshkosh, WI: Akron Firestone Non-Skids 49, Oshkosh All-Stars 43
- February 18, 1941 @ Akron, OH: Hammond Ciesar All-Americans 37, Akron Firestone Non-Skids 47
- February 22, 1941 @ Akron, OH: Akron Firestone Non-Skids 47, Akron Goodyear Wingfoots 42
- February 28, 1941 @ Akron, OH: Chicago Bruins 27, Akron Firestone Non-Skids 46

== NBL Playoffs ==
=== NBL Semifinals ===
(2/3) Akron Firestone Non-Skids vs. (1) Oshkosh All-Stars: Oshkosh wins series 2–0

- Game 1: March 4, 1941 @ Akron: Oshkosh 30, Akron 28
- Game 2: March 6, 1941 @ Oshkosh: Oshkosh 47, Akron 41 (OT)

== Awards and honors ==
- First Team All-NBL – Jack Ozburn
