= 1938–39 Akron Firestone Non-Skids season =

NBL professional basketball team season

- NBL champions
- Division champions
- Head coach: Paul Sheeks
- Owner: Firestone
- Arena: Firestone Clubhouse

Results
- Record: 24–3 (.889)
- Place: Division: 1st (Eastern)
- Playoff finish: NBL champions (Won 3–2 over Oshkosh All-Stars)

The 1938–39 Akron Firestone Non-Skids season was the Non-Skids' second year in the United States' National Basketball League (NBL), which was also the second year the league existed. However, if one were to include their previous seasons of play in both precursors of sorts to the NBL in the National Professional Basketball League and the Midwest Basketball Conference alongside the couple of independent seasons of play they had before officially entering the NBL, this would officially be their seventh season of play instead. Eight teams competed in the NBL, comprising four teams each in the Eastern and Western Divisions. The Non-Skids were one of two teams from Akron, Ohio in the league, the other being the Akron Goodyear Wingfoots.

The Non-Skids played their home games at the Firestone Clubhouse. They finished the season with a league best 24–3 record and won the Eastern Division. While their first loss as a team would happen against the Kingston Colonials from the rivaling American Basketball League some time in January 1938, the Firestone Non-Skids would only lose three total NBL games on February 15 against their cityside rivals in the Akron Goodyear Wingfoots (as the home team), March 4 on the road against the Oshkosh All-Stars, and March 8 at home against the Cleveland White Horses. (As such, if one were to include the exhibition games the Firestone Non-Skids played before playing their championship round matches against the Oshkosh All-Stars, their official record by that point in time when combining the NBL's scheduled games with the exhibition games they played would be 44–4 instead of 24–3.) Despite not being able to complete a full 28 games for their NBL season due to a scheduled home match against the Pittsburgh Pirates NBL team being cancelled, they then went on to win the league's championship series match-up against the Western Division's Oshkosh All-Stars three games to two in a best-of-five series, with their home championship games being played at the Goodyear Hall instead of their typical home venue due to it being double the capacity of their home venue at the Firestone headquarters of theirs.

Due in part to the number of NBL scheduled games this season and the number of games they lost this season (with them winning their first 17 straight games in a row before losing to the Akron Goodyear Wingfoots and then losing twice in a row to the Oshkosh All-Stars and Cleveland White Horses), this Akron Firestone Non-Skids roster could make a solid case for being named the best NBL roster of all-time throughout the league's 12-year history, especially since they had the best overall winning percentage with a .889 total for NBL teams in their NBL schedules (not including their exhibition games won for a 20–1 record there) this season.

Head coach Paul Sheeks won the league's Coach of the Year Award. Players Jerry Bush and Soup Cable earned First Team All-NBL honors, while John Moir and Jack Ozburn earned Second Team All-NBL honors.

== Roster ==
1938–39 Akron Firestone Non-Skids roster
Players

Pos.	No.	Player	Height	Weight	DOB	From
G/F		Al Bonniwell	6 ft 1 in (1.85 m)	175 lb (79 kg)	1911–10-06	Dartmouth
F/C		Jerry Bush	6 ft 3 in (1.91 m)	200 lb (91 kg)	1914–09–06	St. John's
G		Soup Cable	6 ft 3 in (1.91 m)	200 lb (91 kg)	1913–04–04	West HS (OH)
G/F		Mally Johnson	5 ft 10 in (1.78 m)	165 lb (75 kg)	1908–02–04	NC State
F		Ted Migdal	5 ft 9 in (1.75 m)	140 lb (64 kg)	1918–02–14	Miami (OH)
F		John Moir	6 ft 2 in (1.88 m)	184 lb (83 kg)	1915–05–22	Notre Dame
C		Paul Nowak	6 ft 5 in (1.96 m)	210 lb (95 kg)	1914–03–14	Notre Dame
G/F		Jack Ozburn	6 ft 1 in (1.85 m)	175 lb (79 kg)	1913–01–04	Monmouth (IL)
F/C		Glenn Roberts	6 ft 4 in (1.93 m)	198 lb (90 kg)	1912–10–25	Emory & Henry
C		Slim Shoun	6 ft 11 in (2.11 m)	210 lb (95 kg)	1904–10–04	Carson–Newman
G		Don Smith	6 ft 0 in (1.83 m)	170 lb (77 kg)	1910–10–18	Pittsburgh
F/C		Irving Terjesen	6 ft 3 in (1.91 m)	195 lb (88 kg)	1915–03–04	NYU
G		Paul Tobin	5 ft 9 in (1.75 m)	170 lb (77 kg)	1909–11–23	West HS (OH)

Coaches
Head coach
- Paul Sheeks

Legend
- (DP) Unsigned draft pick
- (FA) Free agent
- (S) Suspended
- Injured

Roster

Note: Paul Nowak and Don Smith were not on the playoffs roster.

== Regular season ==
=== Season standings ===
Pos.	Eastern Division	Wins	Losses	Win %
1	Akron Firestone Non-Skids	24	3	.889
T–2	Akron Goodyear Wingfoots	14	14	.500
T–2	Warren Penns / Cleveland White Horses^{‡}	14	14	.500
4	Pittsburgh Pirates	13	14	.481
^{‡} Warren relocated to Cleveland during the season and assumed Warren's record in the standings. Warren's record was 9–10 and Cleveland's record was 5–4.

=== NBL Schedule ===
Not to be confused with exhibition or other non-NBL scheduled games that did not count towards the official NBL record for the Akron Firestone Non-Skids this season. The Akron Firestone Non-Skids would notably start their season out with a 17-game winning streak (in a 28-game regular season) before losing their first game against their inner city works team rivals in the Akron Goodyear Wingfoots on February 15, 1939. The Firestone Non-Skids would only lose two more times in the NBL's season (being in a back-to-back period to start out March against the Cleveland White Horses and the Oshkosh All-Stars) before finishing with the best record in the NBL this season. A 28th game was intended to have been played between the Firestone Non-Skids and the Indianapolis Kautskys (with that game being intended to be a home game for this Akron squad), but it was delayed and eventually cancelled due to weather issues in Akron, Ohio, with that game not affecting the final standings in a significant manner this season.

- November 23, 1938 @ Sheboygan, WI: Akron Firestone Non-Skids 36, Sheboygan Red Skins 33
- November 27, 1938 @ Akron, OH: Hammond Ciesar All-Americans 35, Akron Firestone Non-Skids 38
- December 4, 1938 @ Hammond, IN: Akron Firestone Non-Skids 40, Hammond Ciesar All-Americans 29
- December 5, 1938 @ Indianapolis, IN: Akron Firestone Non-Skids 39, Indianapolis Kautskys 34
- December 8, 1938 @ Warren, PA: Akron Firestone Non-Skids 45, Warren Penns 32
- December 14, 1938 @ Pittsburgh, PA: Akron Firestone Non-Skids 43, Pittsburgh Pirates 28
- December 18, 1938 @ Akron, OH: Sheboygan Red Skins 35, Akron Firestone Non-Skids 37
- December 27, 1938 @ Akron, OH: Hammond Ciesar All-Americans 35, Akron Firestone Non-Skids 60
- January 11, 1939 @ Sheboygan, WI: Akron Firestone Non-Skids 51, Sheboygan Red Skins 35
- January 14, 1939 @ Oshkosh, WI: Akron Firestone Non-Skids 46, Oshkosh All-Stars 44
- January 18, 1939 @ Akron, OH: Akron Firestone Non-Skids 43, Akron Goodyear Wingfoots 31
- January 22, 1939 @ Akron, OH: Oshkosh All-Stars 41, Akron Firestone Non-Skids 46
- January 28, 1939 @ Akron, OH: Akron Firestone Non-Skids 38, Akron Goodyear Wingfoots 23
- February 2, 1939 @ Akron, OH: Pittsburgh Pirates 33, Akron Firestone Non-Skids 41
- February 5, 1939 @ Akron, OH: Sheboygan Red Skins 26, Akron Firestone Non-Skids 42
- February 8, 1939 @ Akron, OH: Warren Penns 39, Akron Firestone Non-Skids 52
- February 12, 1939 @ Akron, OH: Indianapolis Kautskys 48, Akron Firestone Non-Skids 68
- February 15, 1939 @ Akron, OH: Akron Goodyear Wingfoots 40, Akron Firestone Non-Skids 37
- February 17, 1939 @ Cleveland, OH: Akron Firestone Non-Skids 32, Cleveland White Horses 29
- February 19, 1939 @ Hammond, IN: Akron Firestone Non-Skids 40, Hammond Ciesar All-Americans 36
- February 20, 1939 @ Indianapolis, IN: Akron Firestone Non-Skids 64, Indianapolis Kautskys 40
- February 23, 1939 @ Akron, OH: Pittsburgh Pirates 30, Akron Firestone Non-Skids 53
- February 25, 1939 @ Akron, OH: Akron Firestone Non-Skids 29, Akron Goodyear Wingfoots 18
- February 27, 1939 @ Akron, OH: Oshkosh All-Stars 51, Akron Firestone Non-Skids 57
- March 4, 1939 @ Oshkosh, WI: Akron Firestone Non-Skids 42, Oshkosh All-Stars 49
- March 8, 1939 @ Akron, OH: Cleveland White Horses 48, Akron Firestone Non-Skids 42
- March 9, 1939 @ Pittsburgh, PA: Akron Firestone Non-Skids 42, Pittsburgh Pirates 41

== NBL Playoffs ==
The NBL Playoffs for this season would only contain a best of five championship series with the two best teams in each division competing against each other for the NBL Championship this season. This means that it would be the 24–3 Akron Firestone Non-Skids in the Eastern Division going up against the 17–11 Oshkosh All-Stars in the Western Division as the sole playoff series for the NBL this season.

=== NBL Championship ===
(E1) Akron Firestone Non-Skids vs. (W1) Oshkosh All-Stars: Akron wins series 3–2

- Game 1: March 14, 1939 @ Akron: Akron 50, Oshkosh 38
- Game 2: March 15, 1939 @ Akron: Oshkosh 38, Akron 36
- Game 3: March 17, 1939 @ Oshkosh: Akron 40, Oshkosh 29
- Game 4: March 18, 1939 @ Oshkosh: Oshkosh 49, Akron 37
- Game 5: March 20, 1939 @ Oshkosh: Akron 37, Oshkosh 30

== Awards and honors ==
- NBL Coach of the Year – Paul Sheeks
- First Team All-NBL – Jerry Bush and Soup Cable
- Second Team All-NBL – John Moir and Jack Ozburn
- All-Time NBL Team – Jerry Bush
