= 1938–39 National Basketball League (United States) season =

1938–39 NBL season
- League: National Basketball League
- Sport: Basketball
- Duration: November 23, 1938 – March 12, 1939; March 14–20, 1939 (Playoffs/Finals)
- Games: 26-28
- Teams: 8

Regular season
- Season champions: Akron Firestone Non-Skids
- Top seed: Akron Firestone Non-Skids
- Season MVP: Leroy Edwards (Oshkosh)
- Top scorer: Leroy Edwards (Oshkosh)

Playoffs
- Eastern champions: Akron Firestone Non-Skids
- Western champions: Oshkosh All-Stars

Finals
- Venue: Firestone Clubhouse, Akron, Ohio; South Park School Gymnasium, Oshkosh, Wisconsin
- Champions: Akron Firestone Non-Skids
- Runners-up: Oshkosh All-Stars

NBL seasons
- ← 1937–38 1939–40 →

The 1938–39 NBL season was the fourth National Basketball League (NBL) season. The regular season began on November 23, 1938, and ended on March 12, 1939. The playoffs began on March 14, 1939, and concluded on March 20, 1939, with the Akron Firestone Non-Skids defeating the Oshkosh All-Stars in the NBL Championship by 3 games to 2.

== Teams ==
The barnstorming Sheboygan Red Skins officially joined the NBL in the mid-season period, with them officially entering the league on December 31, 1938. Interestingly, some of the games that the Sheboygan Red Skins had played against the NBL's teams this season would end up retroactively counting as a part of Sheboygan's season alongside every other NBL team that competed against team during this time.

By contrast, six teams this season in the Buffalo Bisons, the Columbus Athletic Supply team, the Dayton Metropolitans, the Fort Wayne General Electrics, the Kankakee Gallagher Trojans, and the Cincinnati Comellos, either departed from the league or folded operations entirely prior to the season beginning and did not compete for this season.

The Whiting Ciesar All-Americans relocated from Whiting, Indiana to nearby Hammond, Indiana.

Eastern Division	Akron Firestone Non-Skids Akron, Ohio	Akron Goodyear Wingfoots Akron, Ohio
Eastern Division	Pittsburgh Pirates Pittsburgh, Pennsylvania	Warren Penns/Cleveland White Horses Warren, Pennsylvania/Cleveland, Ohio
Western Division	Hammond Ciesar All-Americans Hammond, Indiana	Indianapolis Kautskys Indianapolis, Indiana
Western Division	Oshkosh All-Stars Oshkosh, Wisconsin	Sheboygan Red Skins Sheboygan, Wisconsin

The Warren Penns moved during the middle of the season in February 1939 from Warren, Pennsylvania to Cleveland, Ohio to become the Cleveland White Horses, following the team reaching a sponsorship deal with the White Motor Company, a Cleveland-based automaker, to help promote the 99 White Horse and 116 White Horse vehicles at the time.

Coaching changes
Offseason
Team	1937–38 coach	1938–39 coach
Indianapolis Kautskys	Frank Kautsky	Bob Nipper
In-season
Team	Outgoing coach	Incoming coach
Whiting Ciesar All-Americans	Whitey Wickhorst	Lou Boudreau (player-coach)

== Preseason ==
The NBL instituted a number of rule changes prior to the season. First, the jump ball was no longer to be used after every possession. Second, the maximum number of personal fouls a player could have to continue playing was increased from four to five. Finally, the NBL began to hire its own referees. While the NBL would end up failing to sign the two biggest college players of its time in Hank Luisetti and Mike Bloom, they would still sign other notable college players who would also have successful professional careers like John Moir, Paul Nowak, John Townsend, Lou Boudreau, Jerry Bush, and future Hall of Famer Buddy Jeannette.

== Regular season ==
Teams played a 28-game schedule (with two home and two road games being played for each franchise) which was mostly followed outside of one game between the Indianapolis Katuskys and the Akron Firestone Non-Skids and another game between the Katuskys and the Pittsburgh Pirates, meaning both the Firestone Non-Skids and the Pirates played in only 27 games this season, while the Kautskys only played in 26 games this season.

== Team standings ==
=== Eastern Division ===
Pos.	Eastern Division	Wins	Losses	Win %
1	Akron Firestone Non-Skids	24	3	.889
T–2	Akron Goodyear Wingfoots	14	14	.500
T–2	Warren Penns / Cleveland White Horses^{‡}	14	14	.500
4	Pittsburgh Pirates	13	14	.481
^{‡} Warren relocated to Cleveland during the season and assumed Warren's record in the standings. Warren's record was 9–10 and Cleveland's record was 5–4.

=== Western Division ===
Pos.	Western Division	Wins	Losses	Win %
1	Oshkosh All-Stars	17	11	.607
2	Indianapolis Kautskys	13	13	.500
3	Sheboygan Red Skins	11	17	.393
4	Hammond Ciesar All-Americans	4	24	.143

== Postseason ==
=== NBL Championship ===
Only the top-seeded team from each division qualified for the playoffs, which used a one-round best-of-five championship. This marked the only time in the league's history where they decided to make their playoffs only consist of a championship round instead of at least utilizing a semifinal playoff round either in proper divisions or in a round robin tournament formatting akin to the first Midwest Basketball Conference season. In any case, the Akron Firestone Non-Skids would defeat the Oshkosh All-Stars three games to two to claim the NBL Championship this season.

NBL Championship
E1	Akron Firestone Non-Skids	50	36	40	37	37
W1	Oshkosh All-Stars	38	38	29	49	30

- Bold Series winner

=== World Professional Basketball Tournament ===
Following the conclusion of the NBL season, the Oshkosh All-Stars and Sheboygan Red Skins represented the NBL in the inaugural World Professional Basketball Tournament held in Chicago, Illinois. Both teams won in the first round and the quarterfinals (though Oshkosh was given a bye in the quarterfinal round instead due to the awkward formatting of the WPBT for this inaugural event), before the All-Stars defeated the Red Skins in the semifinals. The All-Stars were the tournament runners-up, losing the final to the all-black New York Renaissance. The Red Skins finished fourth, losing the third-place game to the similarly all-black Harlem Globetrotters.

== Statistics ==
=== Leaders ===
Category	Player	Team	Stat
Points	Leroy Edwards	Oshkosh All-Stars	334
Free-Throws	Leroy Edwards	Oshkosh All-Stars	86
Field goals	Leroy Edwards	Oshkosh All-Stars	124

Note: Prior to the 1969–70 NBA season, league leaders in points were determined by totals rather than averages. Also, rebounding and assist numbers were not recorded properly in the NBL like they would be in the BAA/NBA, as would field goal and free-throw shooting percentages.

== Awards ==
- NBL Most Valuable Player: Leroy Edwards, Oshkosh All-Stars
- NBL Coach of the Year: Paul Sheeks, Akron Firestone Non-Skids
- NBL Rookie of the Year: Jewell Young, Indianapolis Kautskys
- All-NBL First Team:
  - F – Jerry Bush, Akron Firestone Non-Skids
  - F – John Sines, Indianapolis Kautskys
  - C/F – Leroy Edwards, Oshkosh All-Stars
  - G/F – Soup Cable, Akron Firestone Non-Skids
  - G – Paul Birch, Pittsburgh Pirates
- All-NBL Second Team:
  - F – John Moir, Akron Firestone Non-Skids
  - F/G – Jack Ozburn, Akron Firestone Non-Skids
  - C/F – Jewell Young, Indianapolis Kautskys
  - G/F – Charley Shipp, Akron Goodyear Wingfoots
  - G – Chuck Bloedorn, Akron Goodyear Wingfoots

== See also ==
- National Basketball League (United States)
