= All-National Basketball League (United States) Team =

The All-National Basketball League Team was an annual National Basketball League (NBL) honor bestowed upon the best players in the United States league following the NBL season. The team was selected every season of the league's existence, from 1937–38 through 1948–49.

Nine players earned at least four total selections, three of whom have been inducted into the Naismith Memorial Basketball Hall of Fame – Bobby McDermott (1988), Buddy Jeannette (1994), and Al Cervi (1985). As of 2026, only Leroy Edwards has yet to be inducted into the Naismith Basketball Hall of Fame. In addition to them, seven other players (five of whom had earned three or less All-NBL First Team and/or Second Team honors) have also entered the Basketball Hall of Fame as well, although two players did so with the honor of making it as a head coach later in their careers either instead of or alongside their time spent as players – John Wooden (once in 1960 as a player and again in 1973 as a head coach for college basketball), Red Holzman (1986 as a head coach in the NBA), Bob Davies (1970), Arnie Risen (1998), George Mikan (1959), Jim Pollard (1978), and Sonny Boswell (2022).

== Key ==
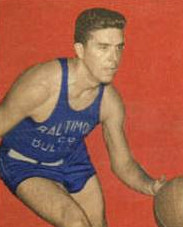
Buddy Jeannette was selected to All-NBL Teams five times.

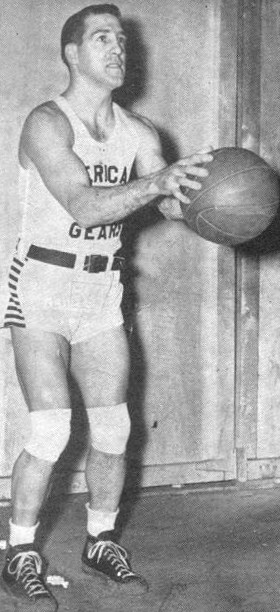
Bobby McDermott was selected to All-NBL Teams seven times, including four consecutive MVP seasons between 1943 and 1946.

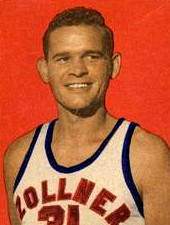
Curly Armstrong's lone All-NBL Team selection came in 1942–43.

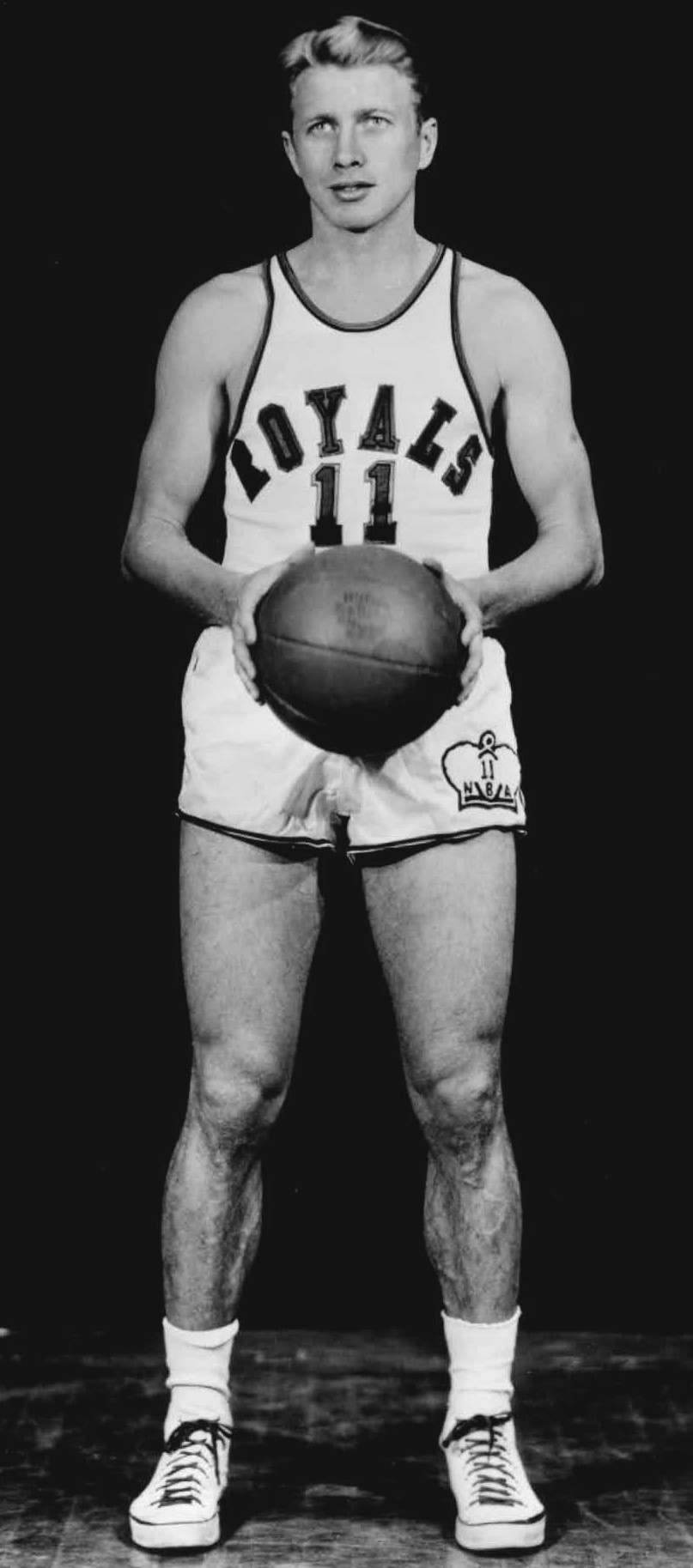
Bob Davies earned two All-NBL Team selections, one of which he was also the league MVP (1947).

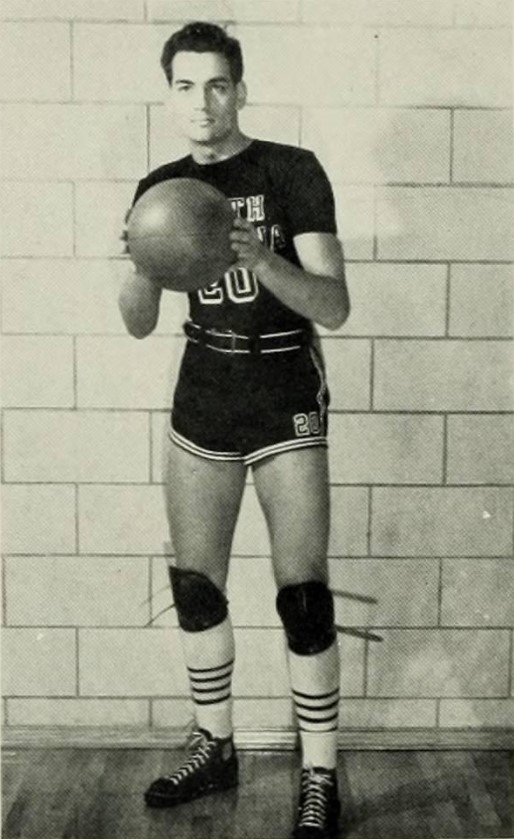
George Glamack was selected to All-NBL Teams twice.

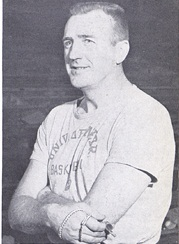
Jerry Bush earned four all-NBL honors, three of them as First Team.

*	Elected to the Naismith Memorial Basketball Hall of Fame
Player (X)	Denotes the number of times the player has been selected
**Player** **(in bold text)**	Indicates the player who won the NBL Most Valuable Player in the same year

== Annual selections ==
Season	First Team		Second Team	
Season	Players	Teams	Players	Teams
1937–38	Scott Armstrong	Fort Wayne General Electrics	Soup Cable	Akron Firestone Non-Skids
1937–38	Chuck Bloedorn	Akron Goodyear Wingfoots	Robert Kessler	Indianapolis Kautskys
1937–38	**Leroy Edwards**	Oshkosh All-Stars	Vince McGowan	Whiting Ciesar All-Americans
1937–38	Charley Shipp	Akron Goodyear Wingfoots	Jack Ozburn	Akron Firestone Non-Skids
1937–38	John Wooden*	Whiting Ciesar All-Americans	Bart Quinn	Fort Wayne General Electrics
1938–39	Paul Birch	Pittsburgh Pirates	Chuck Bloedorn (2)	Akron Goodyear Wingfoots
1938–39	Jerry Bush	Akron Firestone Non-Skids	John Moir	Akron Firestone Non-Skids
1938–39	Soup Cable (2)	Akron Firestone Non-Skids	Jack Ozburn (2)	Akron Firestone Non-Skids
1938–39	**Leroy Edwards** (2)	Oshkosh All-Stars	Charley Shipp (2)	Akron Goodyear Wingfoots
1938–39	John Sines	Indianapolis Kautskys	Jewell Young	Indianapolis Kautskys
1939–40	Soup Cable (3)	Akron Firestone Non-Skids	Ernie Andres	Indianapolis Kautskys
1939–40	**Leroy Edwards** (3)	Oshkosh All-Stars	Nat Frankel	Detroit Eagles
1939–40	Wibs Kautz	Chicago Bruins	Otto Kolar	Sheboygan Red Skins
1939–40	Charley Shipp (3)	Oshkosh All-Stars	Rube Lautenschlager	Sheboygan Red Skins
1939–40	Ben Stephens	Akron Goodyear Wingfoots	Jack Ozburn (3)	Akron Firestone Non-Skids
1940–41	Leroy Edwards (4)	Oshkosh All-Stars	Bob Calihan	Detroit Eagles
1940–41	Buddy Jeannette*	Detroit Eagles	Bill Hapac	Chicago Bruins
1940–41	Jack Ozburn (4)	Akron Firestone Non-Skids	Wibs Kautz (2)	Chicago Bruins
1940–41	Ed Sadowski	Detroit Eagles	Bobby Neu	Hammond Ciesar All-Americans
1940–41	Charley Shipp (4)	Oshkosh All-Stars	Jake Pelkington	Akron Goodyear Wingfoots
1940–41	**Ben Stephens** (2)	Akron Goodyear Wingfoots	Ralph Vaughn	Hammond Ciesar All-Americans / Chicago Bruins
1941–42	Chuck Chuckovits	Toledo Jim White Chevrolets	Ed Dancker	Sheboygan Red Skins
1941–42	Leroy Edwards (5)	Oshkosh All-Stars	George Glamack	Akron Goodyear Wingfoots
1941–42	**Bobby McDermott***	Fort Wayne Zollner Pistons	Herm Schaefer	Fort Wayne Zollner Pistons
1941–42	Charley Shipp (5)	Oshkosh All-Stars	Ralph Vaughn (2)	Chicago Bruins
1941–42	Ben Stephens (3)	Akron Goodyear Wingfoots	Jewell Young (2)	Indianapolis Kautskys
1942–43	Curly Armstrong	Fort Wayne Zollner Pistons	Sonny Boswell*	Chicago Studebaker Flyers
1942–43	Ed Dancker (2)	Sheboygan Red Skins	Jerry Bush (2)	Fort Wayne Zollner Pistons
1942–43	**Bobby McDermott*** (2)	Fort Wayne Zollner Pistons	Leroy Edwards (6)	Oshkosh All-Stars
1942–43	Charley Shipp (6)	Oshkosh All-Stars	Buddy Jeannette* (2)	Sheboygan Red Skins
1942–43	Ralph Vaughn (3)	Oshkosh All-Stars	Ken Suesens	Sheboygan Red Skins
1943–44	Ed Dancker (3)	Sheboygan Red Skins	Jerry Bush (3)	Fort Wayne Zollner Pistons
1943–44	Buddy Jeannette* (3)	Fort Wayne Zollner Pistons	Rube Lautenschlager (2)	Sheboygan Red Skins
1943–44	**Bobby McDermott*** (3)	Fort Wayne Zollner Pistons	Jake Pelkington (2)	Fort Wayne Zollner Pistons
1943–44	Mel Riebe	Cleveland Chase Brassmen	Charley Shipp (7)	Oshkosh All-Stars
1943–44	Clint Wager	Oshkosh All-Stars	Ken Suesens (2)	Sheboygan Red Skins
1944–45	Leroy Edwards (7)	Oshkosh All-Stars	Jerry Bush (4)	Fort Wayne Zollner Pistons
1944–45	Buddy Jeannette* (4)	Fort Wayne Zollner Pistons	Ed Dancker (4)	Sheboygan Red Skins
1944–45	**Bobby McDermott*** (4)	Fort Wayne Zollner Pistons	Huck Hartman	Pittsburgh Raiders
1944–45	Stan Patrick	Chicago American Gears	Jake Pelkington (3)	Fort Wayne Zollner Pistons
1944–45	Mel Riebe (2)	Cleveland Allmen Transfers	Dick Triptow	Chicago American Gears
1945–46	Bob Carpenter	Oshkosh All-Stars	Frank Baumholtz	Youngstown Bears
1945–46	Ed Dancker (5)	Sheboygan Red Skins	Bob Calihan (2)	Chicago American Gears
1945–46	George Glamack (2)	Rochester Royals	Al Cervi*	Rochester Royals
1945–46	Red Holzman*	Rochester Royals	Leroy Edwards (8)	Oshkosh All-Stars
1945–46	Buddy Jeannette* (5)	Fort Wayne Zollner Pistons	Mike Novak	Sheboygan Red Skins
1945–46	**Bobby McDermott*** (5)	Fort Wayne Zollner Pistons	Jerry Steiner	Indianapolis Kautskys
1946–47	Al Cervi* (2)	Rochester Royals	Bob Calihan (3)	Chicago American Gears
1946–47	**Bob Davies***	Rochester Royals	Bob Carpenter (2)	Oshkosh All-Stars
1946–47	Fred Lewis	Sheboygan Red Skins	Red Holzman* (2)	Rochester Royals
1946–47	Bobby McDermott* (6)	Fort Wayne Zollner Pistons / Chicago American Gears	Arnie Risen*	Indianapolis Kautskys
1946–47	George Mikan*	Chicago American Gears	Hal Tidrick	Toledo Jeeps
1947–48	Al Cervi* (3)	Rochester Royals	Frank Brian	Anderson Duffey Packers
1947–48	Red Holzman* (3)	Rochester Royals	Bob Calihan (4)	Flint/Midland Dow A.C.'s
1947–48	**George Mikan*** (2)	Minneapolis Lakers	Bob Davies* (2)	Rochester Royals
1947–48	Jim Pollard*	Minneapolis Lakers	Bobby McDermott* (7)	Sheboygan Red Skins / Tri-Cities Blackhawks
1947–48	Mike Todorovich	Sheboygan Red Skins	Don Otten	Tri-Cities Blackhawks
1948–49	Frank Brian (2)	Anderson Duffey Packers	Bill Closs	Anderson Duffey Packers
1948–49	Al Cervi* (4)	Syracuse Nationals	Hoot Gibson	Tri-Cities Blackhawks / Denver Nuggets
1948–49	Gene Englund	Oshkosh All-Stars	Boag Johnson	Anderson Duffey Packers
1948–49	Dick Mehen	Waterloo Hawks	Mike Todorovich (2)	Sheboygan Red Skins
1948–49	**Don Otten** (2)	Tri-Cities Blackhawks	Whitey Von Nieda	Tri-Cities Blackhawks

== Most selections ==
The following table only lists players with at least four total selections.

Player	Total	First Team	Second Team	MVP	Seasons played
Leroy Edwards	8	6	2	3	12
Bobby McDermott*	7	6	1	5	8
Charley Shipp	7	5	2	0	12
Ed Dancker	5	3	2	0	11
Buddy Jeannette*	5	4	1	0	7
Jerry Bush	4	1	3	0	9
Bob Calihan	4	0	4	0	5
Al Cervi*	4	3	1	0	5
Jack Ozburn	4	1	3	0	5

== All-Time NBL Team ==
*	Elected to the Naismith Memorial Basketball Hall of Fame as a player

While most information regarding the creation of the All-Time NBL Team is unknown as of 2025, what is known is that sometime during the late 20th century (or even the early 21st century, although that point would be highly unlikely), the ranking for what was considered the NBL's twenty best all-time players was voted by members of the print and broadcast news media that would have reported on and announced games for the NBL, including statisticians. It's unknown if the ranking was done similarly to what occurred with the ABA All-Time Team or if its ranking was done before the ABA All-Time Team was done. Regardless, this team consists of the twenty best and most influential players of the NBL during its twelve seasons of existence after previously starting out as the Midwest Basketball Conference amateur or semipro basketball league back in 1935, with respect not only to performance at the professional level, but in consideration of sportsmanship, team leadership, and contributions to the growth of the league and the sport of basketball, and irrespective of positions played.

The following information for the All-Time NBL Team is found in the referenced archive link.

Name	Position	Team(s) played for (years)	Championships won	Award(s) won	Hall of Fame induction (as player)	Ref.
Jerry Bush	F/C	Akron Firestone Non-Skids (1938–1941); Fort Wayne Zollner Pistons (1941–1947); Anderson Duffey Packers (1946–1947); Toledo Jeeps (1947–1948)	1939, 1940, 1944, 1945	All-NBL First Team (1939); All-NBL Second Team (1943–1945)	—	
Bob Carpenter	F/C	Oshkosh All-Stars (1940–1941, 1945–1948, 1949); Hammond Calumet Buccaneers (1948–1949)	1941	NBL scoring leader (1946); All-NBL First Team (1946); All-NBL Second Team (1947)	—	
Al Cervi	G/F	Buffalo Bisons (1937–1938); Rochester Royals (1945–1948); Syracuse Nationals (1948–1949)	1946	NBL scoring leader (1947); All-NBL First Team (1947–1949); All-NBL Second Team (1946)	1985	
Chuck Chuckovits	F/G	Hammond Ciesar All-Americans (1939–1940); Toledo Jim White Chevrolets (1941–1942)	None	NBL scoring leader (1942); All-NBL First Team (1942)	—	
Ed Dancker	C/F	Sheboygan Red Skins (1938–1948); Oshkosh All-Stars (1948–1949)	1943	All-NBL First Team (1943–1944, 1946); All NBL Second Team (1942, 1945)	—	
Bob Davies*	G/F	Rochester Royals (1945–1948)	1946	NBL MVP (1947); All-NBL First Team (1947); All-NBL Second Team (1948)	1970	
Leroy Edwards	C/F	Oshkosh All-Stars (1937–1949)	1941, 1942	NBL MVP (1938–1940); NBL scoring leader (1938–1940); All-NBL First Team (1938–1942, 1945); All-NBL Second Team (1943, 1946)	—	
Gene Englund	F/C	Oshkosh All-Stars (1941–1949)	1942	All-NBL First Team (1949)	—	
Pop Gates*	F/G	Buffalo Bisons / Tri-Cities Blackhawks (1946–1947); Dayton Rens (1948–1949)	None	None	1989	
George Glamack	C/F	Akron Goodyear Wingfoots (1941–1942); Rochester Royals (1945–1947); Indianapolis Kautskys (1947–1948); Hammond Calumet Buccaneers (1948–1949)	1946	NBL Rookie of the Year (1942); All-NBL First Team (1946); All-NBL Second Team (1942)	—	
Buddy Jeannette*	G	Warren Penns / Cleveland White Horses (1938–1939); Detroit Eagles (1939–1941); Sheboygan Red Skins (1943); Fort Wayne Zollner Pistons (1943–1946)	1943, 1944, 1945	All-NBL First Team (1941, 1944–1946); All-NBL Second Team (1943)	1994	
Bobby McDermott*	G	Fort Wayne Zollner Pistons (1941–1946); Chicago American Gears (1946–1947); Sheboygan Red Skins (1947); Tri-Cities Blackhawks (1947–1948); Hammond Calumet Buccaneers (1948–1949)	1944, 1945, 1947	NBL MVP (1942–1946); NBL scoring leader (1943); All-NBL First Team (1942–1947); All-NBL Second Team (1948)	1988	
George Mikan*	C	Chicago American Gears (1946–1947); Minneapolis Lakers (1947–1948)	1947, 1948	NBL MVP (1948); NBL scoring leader (1948); All-NBL First Team (1947–1948)	1959	
Mike Novak	C/F	Chicago Bruins (1939–1942); Chicago Studebaker Flyers (1942–1943); Sheboygan Red Skins (1943–1946); Syracuse Nationals (1946–1948)	None	All-NBL Second Team (1946)	—	
Don Otten	C	Buffalo Bisons / Tri-Cities Blackhawks (1946–1949)	None	NBL MVP (1949); NBL scoring leader (1949); All-NBL First Team (1949); All-NBL Second Team (1948)	—	
Mel Riebe	G/F	Cleveland Chase Brassmen / Allmen Transfers (1943–1946)	None	NBL Rookie of the Year (1944); NBL scoring leader (1944–1945); All-NBL First Team (1944–1945)	—	
Arnie Risen*	C/F	Indianapolis Kautskys (1945–1948); Rochester Royals (1948)	None	All-NBL Second Team (1947)	1998	
Charley Shipp	G/F	Akron Goodyear Wingfoots (1937–1939); Oshkosh All-Stars (1939–1944); Fort Wayne Zollner Pistons (1944–1946); Anderson Duffey Packers (1946–1948); Waterloo Hawks (1948–1949)	1938, 1941, 1942, 1945	All-NBL First Team (1938, 1940–1943); All-NBL Second Team (1939, 1944)	—	
Ben Stephens	G/F	Akron Goodyear Wingfoots (1939–1942)	None	NBL Rookie of the Year (1940); NBL MVP (1941); NBL scoring leader (1941); All-NBL First Team (1940–1942)	—	
Mike Todorovich	F/C	Sheboygan Red Skins (1947–1949)	None	NBL Rookie of the Year (1948); All-NBL First Team (1948); All-NBL Second Team (1949)	—	

In addition to those twenty voted players, media voting also gave special voting for the honor of the All-Time Greatest NBL Player from the assorted group as well, with the honor being given out to Bobby McDermott, with votes also (likely) being given out to Leroy Edwards as well.

== See also ==
- All-NBA Team
- All-ABA Team
  - ABA All-Time Team
