= List of National Basketball League (United States) scoring leaders =

In basketball, points are accumulated through free throws or field goals. The National Basketball League's (NBL) scoring title was awarded to the player with the most total points in a given season.

Naismith Memorial Basketball Hall of Fame inductee Bobby McDermott holds the NBL all-time record for career points scored (3,583), while fellow Hall of Famer George Mikan holds the single season points (1,195) and points per game (21.3) records. McDermott earned the most points spanning an eight-year NBL career, but Mikan only played two seasons and set both records during 1947–48, the penultimate year the league existed.

== Key ==
*		Inducted into the Naismith Memorial Basketball Hall of Fame			
†		Denotes player who won the MVP Award that year			
Player (X)		Denotes the number of times the player had been the scoring leader up to and including that season			
G	Guard	F	Forward	C	Center

== Season scoring leaders ==
Season	Player	Pos.	Team	Total points	Games played	PPG	Field goals made	Free throws made	Ref.
1937–38†	Leroy Edwards	C	Oshkosh All-Stars	210	13	16.2	83	44	
1938–39†	Leroy Edwards (2)	C	Oshkosh All-Stars	334	28	11.9	124	86	
1939–40†	Leroy Edwards (3)	C	Oshkosh All-Stars	361	28	12.9	111	139	
1940–41†	Ben Stephens	G/F	Akron Goodyear Wingfoots	265	24	11.0	98	69	
1941–42†	Chuck Chuckovits	G/F	Toledo Jim White Chevrolets	406	22	18.5	143	120	
1942–43†	Bobby McDermott*	G	Fort Wayne Zollner Pistons	316	23	13.7	132	52	
1943–44	Mel Riebe	G/F	Cleveland Chase Brassmen	323	18	17.9	113	97	
1944–45	Mel Riebe (2)	G/F	Cleveland Allmen Transfers	607	30	20.2	223	161	
1945–46	Bob Carpenter	F/C	Oshkosh All-Stars	473	34	13.9	186	101	
1946–47	Al Cervi*	G/F	Rochester Royals	632	44	14.4	228	176	
1947–48†	George Mikan*	C	Minneapolis Lakers	1,195	56	21.3	406	383	
1948–49†	Don Otten	C	Tri-Cities Blackhawks	899	64	14.0	301	297	

== Career scoring leaders ==
Rank	Player	Pos.	Team(s) played for (years)	Total points	Games played	PPG	Field goals made	Free throws made	Ref.
1	Bobby McDermott*	G	Fort Wayne Zollner Pistons (1941–1946); Chicago American Gears (1946–1947); Sheboygan Red Skins (1947); Tri-Cities Blackhawks (1947–1949); Hammond Calumet Buccaneers (1949)	3,583	287	12.48	1,465	653	
2	Leroy Edwards	C	Oshkosh All-Stars (1937–1949)	3,221	322	10.00	1,045	1,131	
3	Gene Englund	F/C	Oshkosh All-Stars (1941–1944, 1945–1949)	2,600	238	10.92	906	788	
4	Ed Dancker	C	Sheboygan Red Skins (1938–1948); Oshkosh All-Stars (1948–1949)	2,490	321	7.76	955	580	
5	Al Cervi*	G/F	Buffalo Bisons (1937–1938); Rochester Royals (1945–1948); Syracuse Nationals (1948–1949)	2,326	187	12.44	797	732	
6	Don Otten	C	Tri-Cities Blackhawks (1946–1949)	2,292	168	13.64	783	726	
7	Mike Novak	F/C	Chicago Bruins (1939–1942); Chicago Studebaker Flyers (1942–1943); Sheboygan Red Skins (1943–1946); Syracuse Nationals (1946–1948)	2,281	267	8.54	880	521	
8	Bob Carpenter	F/C	Oshkosh All-Stars (1940–1941, 1945–1948); Hammond Calumet Buccaneers (1948–1949)	2,140	209	10.24	796	548	
9	George Glamack	F/C	Akron Goodyear Wingfoots (1941–1942); Rochester Royals (1945–1947); Indianapolis Kautskys (1947–1948); Hammond Calumet Buccaneers (1948–1949)	2,138	202	10.58	763	612	
10	Jake Pelkington	F/C	Akron Goodyear Wingfoots (1940–1941); Fort Wayne Zollner Pistons (1942–1948)	1,949	226	8.62	668	613	
11	Charley Shipp	G/F	Akron Goodyear Wingfoots (1937–1939); Oshkosh All-Stars (1939–1944); Fort Wayne Zollner Pistons (1944–1946); Anderson Duffey Packers (1946–1948); Waterloo Hawks (1948–1949)	1,935	376	5.15	765	405	
12	Bob Calihan	G/F	Detroit Eagles (1940–1941); Chicago American Gears (1945–1947); Flint/Midland Dow A.C.'s (1947–1948); Syracuse Nationals (1948–1949)	1,810	165	10.96	675	460	
13	Stan Patrick	G/F	Chicago American Gears (1944–1947); Flint/Midland Dow A.C.'s (1947–1948); Hammond Calumet Buccaneers (1948–1949)	1,765	212	8.33	681	403	
14	George Mikan*	C	Chicago American Gears (1946–1947); Minneapolis Lakers (1947–1948)	1,608	81	19.85	553	502	
15	Arnie Risen*	C	Indianapolis Kautskys (1945–1948); Rochester Royals (1948)	1,606	123	13.06	563	480	
16	Howie Schultz	F/C	Anderson Duffey Packers (1946–1949)	1,600	165	9.70	544	512	
17	Red Holzman*	G	Rochester Royals (1945–1948)	1,500	138	10.86	616	268	
18	Rube Lautenschlager	G/F	Sheboygan Red Skins (1938–1947)	1,442	222	6.49	598	246	
19	Chips Sobek	G	Indianapolis Kautskys (1945–1946); Toledo Jeeps (1946–1948); Hammond Calumet Buccaneers (1948–1949)	1,434	148	9.68	449	536	
20	Mike Todorovich	F/C	Sheboygan Red Skins (1947–1949)	1,425	120	11.87	516	393	
21	Whitey Von Nieda	G/F	Tri-Cities Blackhawks (1947–1949)	1,367	124	11.02	523	321	
22	Harry Boykoff	C	Toledo Jeeps (1947–1948); Waterloo Hawks (1948–1949)	1,351	120	11.25	518	315	
23	Buddy Jeannette*	G	Warren Penns / Cleveland White Horses (1938–1939); Detroit Eagles (1939–1941); Sheboygan Red Skins (1942–1943); Fort Wayne Zollner Pistons (1943–1946)	1,324	162	8.17	451	422	
24	Clint Wager	F/C	Oshkosh All-Stars (1943–1948); Hammond Calumet Buccaneers (1948–1949)	1,319	247	5.34	500	319	
25	Hal Tidrick	G/F	Sheboygan Red Skins (1944–1945); Toledo Jeeps (1946–1948)	1,302	104	12.51	499	304	

== See also ==
- List of National Basketball Association annual scoring leaders
- List of National Basketball Association career scoring leaders
