= 1932–33 Akron Firestone Non-Skids season =

NPBL professional basketball team champion season

- League champions
- Division champions
- League: National Professional Basketball League
- Head coach: Paul Sheeks
- Owner(s): Firestone
- Arena: Firestone Clubhouse

Results
- Record: 10–1 (.909)
- Place: Division: 1st
- Playoff finish: NPBL Champions (Won 3–0 over Toledo Crimson Coaches Tobaccos)

The 1932–33 Akron Firestone Non-Skids season was the Firestone Non-Skids' first season of existence as a franchise, as well as their only season in the National Professional Basketball League (NPBL), a short-lived professional basketball league of sorts that could be seen as the precursor of both the Midwest Basketball Conference (MBC) and the National Basketball League (NBL), with the latter league eventually merging operations in 1949 with the younger, rivaling Basketball Association of America (BAA) to become the National Basketball Association (NBA). Entering this season, the Firestone Non-Skids would join the inner city rivaling Akron Goodyear Wingfoots and the Indianapolis Kautskys team that was owned by Frank Kautsky as three of the nine incoming teams to create that new league (with two of the teams presumably being former American Basketball League under rebranded names in the Fort Wayne Chiefs and the Toledo Crimson Coaches Tobaccos). (Interestingly, Firestone's team was considered one-half of the Akron, Ohio representatives that were interested in joining this league at a time when the initial final attempt for creating the NPBL for this season had representatives in Fort Wayne, Indiana within that state's Anthony Wayne Hotel being joined by representatives in Chicago, Illinois and other Ohio locations beyond just their home area with Canton, Cleveland, Dayton, and Toledo meeting at the time for an eight-team league before eventually deciding to be a combined Indiana-Ohio nine-team league there.) Unfortunately for the rest of the league, four of the teams created would end up folding operations throughout the season for one reason or another, with the Akron Goodyear Wingfoots playing in only six games this year. For the Firestone Non-Skids, they would lose only one game to miss out on having a perfect record for their season, though the Firestone squad finished with a 10–1 record for a first place and later ending with a 3–0 championship sweep over the Toledo Crimson Coaches Tobaccos (a team that previously played in the 1929 version of the NPBL and won that championship as the Toledo Red Man Tobaccos) for the only complete season in that version of the NPBL. After a few years of independent play, head coach Paul Sheeks alongside Frank Kautsky of the Indianapolis Kautskys would help create the Midwest Basketball Conference with mostly new teams being added to help succeed the original version of the NPBL that Akron and Indianapolis had played under.

== Roster ==
Due to information on National Professional Basketball League players being generally hard to find, there are bound to be more gaps and/or inaccuracies found in certain areas on the team's roster spots than usual.

1932–33 Akron Firestone Non-Skids roster
Players

Pos.	No.	Player	Height	Weight	DOB	From
F/C		Merle Alexander	6 ft 6 in (1.98 m)	185 lb (84 kg)	1907–09–02	Franklin (IN)
G		Bill Brandy	6 ft 0 in (1.83 m)	180 lb (82 kg)	1909–07–23	Heidelberg College
G/F		Donald Burdette	5 ft 11 in (1.80 m)	170 lb (77 kg)	1902–12–31	Wabash College
G		Roy "Goose" Burris	5 ft 10 in (1.78 m)	150 lb (68 kg)	1901–04–12	Indiana Normal
F/C		Shang Chadwick	6 ft 5 in (1.96 m)	220 lb (100 kg)	1901–06–09	Wabash College
F		Cookie Cunningham	6 ft 3 in (1.91 m)	200 lb (91 kg)	1905–02–04	Ohio State
G		Ray Dickerson	6 ft 0 in (1.83 m)	165 lb (75 kg)	1908–06–15	Northeastern State
G		Bill Reeves	5 ft 10 in (1.78 m)	165 lb (75 kg)	1904–12–05	Central Normal (IN)
G/F		Ginger Reeves	5 ft 11 in (1.80 m)	185 lb (84 kg)	1906–06–28	Central Normal (IN)
C		Slim Shoun	6 ft 11 in (2.11 m)	210 lb (95 kg)	1904–10–04	Carson–Newman

Coaches
Head coach
- Paul Sheeks

Legend
- (DP) Unsigned draft pick
- (FA) Free agent
- (S) Suspended
- Injured

== NPBL Standings ==
Pos.	Team	Wins	Losses	Win %
1	Akron Firestone Non-Skids	10	1	.909
2	Toledo Crimson Coaches Tobaccos	8	4	.667
3	Indianapolis Kautskys	7	4	.636
4	Akron Goodyear Wingfoots	2	4	.333
5	Fort Wayne Chiefs	4	9	.308
6	Kokomo Kelts†	2	3	.400
7	Muncie Whys†	1	4	.200
8	South Bend Guardsmen†	1	5	.167
9	Lorain Fisher Foods†	0	1	.000

† – Dropped out of the NPBL at various points in the season.

== NPBL Playoffs ==
Due to the number of teams dwindling down from nine to only five teams for this season, this version of NPBL's playoffs would essentially be a best-of-five championship series between the two best teams remaining in the league, which coincidentally were both in the state of Ohio.

=== NPBL Championship Series ===
(1) Akron Firestone Non-Skids vs. (2) Toledo Crimson Coaches Tobaccos: Akron wins series 3–0

- Game 1 @ Toledo: Akron 18, Toledo 13
- Game 2 @ Akron: Akron 31, Toledo 24
- Game 3 @ Toledo: Akron 27, Toledo 24
