= Ted Migdal =

American basketball player (1918–1999)

Personal information
- Born: February 14, 1918 Joliet, Illinois, U.S.
- Died: November 1, 1999 (aged 85) Napa, California, U.S.
- Listed height: 5 ft 9 in (1.75 m)
- Listed weight: 140 lb (64 kg)

Career information
- High school: Garfield (Akron, Ohio)
- College: Miami (Ohio) (1939–1941)
- Playing career: 1938–1939
- Position: Forward

Career history
- 1938–1939: Akron Firestone Non-Skids

Career highlights
- NBL champion (1939)

Theodore Migdal Jr. (February 14, 1918 – November 1, 1999) was an American professional basketball player. He played for the Akron Firestone Non-Skids in the National Basketball League during 1938–39, averaged 9.0 points per game, and won the NBL championship.
