= Paul Nowak =

Paul Nowak may refer to:

- Paul Nowak (basketball) (1914–1983), American basketball player
- Paul Nowak (trade unionist) (born 1972), British trade union official
- Paul Nowak, Iron Cross recipient, see List of Knight's Cross of the Iron Cross recipients (N)
