= Paul Tobin (basketball) =

American basketball player (1909–2003)

Personal information
- Born: November 23, 1909 Paterson, New Jersey, U.S.
- Died: September 6, 2003 (aged 93) Akron, Ohio, U.S.
- Listed height: 5 ft 9 in (1.75 m)
- Listed weight: 170 lb (77 kg)

Career information
- High school: West (Akron, Ohio)
- Playing career: 1937–1940
- Position: Guard

Career history
- 1937–1940: Akron Firestone Non-Skids

Career highlights
- 2× NBL champion (1939, 1940)

Paul Samuel Tobin (November 23, 1909 – September 6, 2003) was an American professional basketball player. Hyatt played in the National Basketball League from 1937 to 1940, competing for the Akron Firestone Non-Skids, and won two league championships in 1938–39 and 1939–40. He was the brother-in-law of Soup Cable, a teammate of Tobin's with Akron.
