= Bob Carpenter (basketball) =

American basketball player

Personal information
- Born: November 6, 1917 Cumby, Texas, U.S.
- Died: April 18, 1997 (aged 79)
- Listed height: 6 ft 5 in (1.96 m)
- Listed weight: 200 lb (91 kg)

Career information
- College: East Texas A&M (1936–1940)
- Position: Power forward / center
- Number: 10, 15

Career history
- 1940–1941, 1945–1949: Oshkosh All-Stars
- 1948: Hammond Calumet Buccaneers
- 1949–1950: Fort Wayne Pistons
- 1950: Tri-Cities Blackhawks

Career highlights
- NBL champion (1941); All-NBL First Team (1946); All-NBL Second Team (1947); NBL scoring champion (1946); NBL All-Time team; First-team All-LSC (1939)
- Stats at NBA.com
- Stats at Basketball Reference

Robert Melvin Carpenter (November 6, 1917 – April 18, 1997) was an American basketball player.

He played collegiately for the East Texas State University (now East Texas A&M University).

He played for the Fort Wayne Pistons (1949–50, 1950–51) and Tri-Cities Blackhawks (1950–51) in the NBA for 122 games.

== Career statistics ==
Legend
GP	Games played	GS	Games started	MPG	Minutes per game
FG%	Field goal percentage	3P%	3-point field goal percentage	FT%	Free throw percentage
RPG	Rebounds per game	APG	Assists per game	SPG	Steals per game
BPG	Blocks per game	PPG	Points per game	**Bold**	Career high

=== NBA ===
==== Regular season ====
Year	Team	GP	FG%	FT%	RPG	APG	PPG
1949–50	Fort Wayne	**66**	.344	.742	–	1.4	**9.3**
1950–51	Fort Wayne	21	.218	.810	3.0	.8	4.8
1950–51	Tri-Cities	35	**.389**	**.829**	**4.8**	**1.8**	6.3
Career		122	.337	.768	4.1	1.4	7.7

==== Playoffs ====
Year	Team	GP	FG%	FT%	APG	PPG
1950	Fort Wayne	4	.367	.714	.5	8.0
