= 1937–38 National Basketball League (United States) season =

1937–38 NBL season
- League: National Basketball League
- Sport: Basketball
- Duration: November 27, 1937 – February 20, 1938; February 22–27, 1938 (Playoffs); February 28–March 4, 1938 (Finals)
- Games: 9-20
- Teams: 13

Regular season
- Season champions: Oshkosh All-Stars
- Top seed: Oshkosh All-Stars
- Season MVP: Leroy Edwards (Oshkosh)
- Top scorer: Leroy Edwards (Oshkosh)

Playoffs
- Eastern champions: Akron Goodyear Wingfoots
- Eastern runners-up: Akron Firestone Non-Skids
- Western champions: Oshkosh All-Stars
- Western runners-up: Whiting Ciesar All-Americans

Finals
- Venue: Goodyear Hall, Akron, Ohio; South Park School Gymnasium, Oshkosh, Wisconsin
- Champions: Akron Goodyear Wingfoots
- Runners-up: Oshkosh All-Stars

MBC/NBL seasons
- ← 1936–37 (MBC) 1938–39 →

The 1937–38 NBL season was the third season of the National Basketball League (NBL), and its first season after the rebranding of the Midwest Basketball Conference as the NBL. The regular season began on November 27, 1937, and ended on February 20, 1938. The playoffs began on February 22, 1938, and concluded on March 4, 1938, with the Akron Goodyear Wingfoots defeating the Oshkosh All-Stars in the NBL Championship by 2 games to 1. This season would be considered the loosest structured of the twelve NBL seasons played, as the lack of proper formatting in mind made this season feel a bit too similar to the two Midwest Basketball Conference seasons played before this one began. Interestingly, this season also saw another, more minor league version of the National Basketball League occur around the same time as this NBL season, though that NBL would be completely unrelated to the actual NBL in question; that specific version of the NBL would last for only one season before folding operations entirely.

== Teams ==
Four teams would compete in the NBL this season that did not play in the MBC during the previous season, with three of them being new to the rebranded league in general. Both the Kankakee Gallagher Trojans and the Richmond King Clothiers played their inaugural (and only) seasons as professional basketball teams during this season in the NBL, while the barnstorming Oshkosh All-Stars joined the league following their high-profile, seven-game championship series of exhibition games against the New York Renaissance, though Oshkosh would not officially join the NBL until December 1937, with their first game in the NBL being played on January 1, 1938. In addition to them, the Buffalo Bisons (who are considered to potentially have existing ties with the Buffalo Bisons ABL team) returned to the now newly rebranded NBL after a one-year hiatus from them.

By contrast, three MBC teams from the previous season (the final season under the MBC name) in the inaugural MBC champion Chicago Duffy Florals, the Detroit Altes Lagers, and the Indianapolis U.S. Tires all either departed from the league like the inaugural MBC champions in Chicago had done, folded operations entirely like Detroit had done, or in the case of the Indianapolis U.S. Tires team, merged operations with the Indianapolis Kautskys prior to the season and did not compete in what can be considered the inaugural NBL season.

Three other teams also renamed themselves prior to the season beginning. First, the Dayton London Bobbys returned to their previous name, the Dayton Metropolitans, after their previous sponsor sold off their sponsorship back to the team's original sponsor, the Dayton Metropolitan Clothing Store. Then, the Pittsburgh Y.M.H.A. team would adopt the Pittsburgh Pirates moniker in honor of the baseball team representing Major League Baseball. Finally, the Warren HyVis Oils renamed themselves to the Warren Penns under team owner/player-coach Gerry Archibald's shrewd and clever thinking for keeping his team sponsorship with HyVis Penn Oil while still promoting their brand during this time.

Eastern Division	Akron Firestone Non-Skids Akron, Ohio	Akron Goodyear Wingfoots Akron, Ohio	Buffalo Bisons Buffalo, New York	
Eastern Division	Columbus Athletic Supply Columbus, Ohio	Pittsburgh Pirates Pittsburgh, Pennsylvania	Warren Penns Warren, Pennsylvania	
Western Division	Dayton Metropolitans Dayton, Ohio	Fort Wayne General Electrics Fort Wayne, Indiana	Indianapolis Kautskys Indianapolis, Indiana	Kankakee Gallagher Trojans Kankakee, Illinois
Western Division	Oshkosh All-Stars Oshkosh, Wisconsin	Richmond King Clothiers/Cincinnati Comellos Richmond, Indiana/Cincinnati, Ohio	Whiting Ciesar All-Americans Whiting, Indiana	Kankakee Gallagher Trojans Kankakee, Illinois

The Richmond King Clothiers unofficially folded in December 1937; they sold their franchise to Augustino "Gus" Comello on January 5, 1938. Comello moved the team from Richmond, Indiana to Cincinnati and renamed the team the Cincinnati Comellos. The Comellos resumed play on January 16, 1938, but their season was cut short (as noted by a forfeited match on their end against the Fort Wayne General Electrics) due to the aftermath of the Ohio River flood of 1937.

Coaching changes
Offseason
Team	1936–37 (MBC) coach	1937–38 (NBL) coach
Columbus Athletic Supply	Fred Wile	Cookie Cunningham (player-coach)
Dayton London Bobbys / Dayton Metropolitans	Bob McConachie	Bill Hosket Sr. (player-coach)
Fort Wayne General Electrics	Ray Lindemuth	Byron Evard (player-coach)
Pittsburgh Y.M.H.A. / Pittsburgh Pirates	Harry Menzel	Dudey Moore (player-coach)
In-season
Team	Outgoing coach	Incoming coach
Cincinnati Comellos	Bob McConachie	John Wiethe (player-coach)

== Preseason ==
Prior to the season, the Midwest Basketball Conference submitted an organizational name change to the National Basketball League, which was made official on October 6, 1937. The purpose of the name change was to help give the league more of a "national effect" and have it feel less like a regional league, according to Warren Penns owner, general manager, head coach, and player Gerry Archibald. The works teams that were competing in the NBL (the Akron Firestone Non-Skids, the Akron Goodyear Wingfoots, and the Fort Wayne General Electrics) also held a unique advantage in acquiring players by allowing them to also work in their respective companies of Firestone, Goodyear, and General Electric (usually through management positions) while in the Great Depression period, while other teams in the league had to be more resourceful by acquiring players from other leagues and nearby colleges at the time.

== Regular season ==
There was a lack of rule standardization in the league, with the home team deciding on timekeeping rules and whether to perform a jump ball after each basket. There were also a number of scheduling issues, which led to widespread forfeits (many of which would not be officially kept track of for each team's planned 20-game seasons) and unbalanced schedules (to the point where only the Fort Wayne General Electrics would actually play through their proper 20-game season, while the Oshkosh All-Stars played their first scheduled NBL game on January 1, 1938) throughout the entire season. League commissioner Hubert Johnson would ultimately leave the scheduling up to the teams themselves once the season began, which led to the awkward number of games shown throughout the entire season for each team. In addition to those issues, two of the NBL's games this season also utilized the rivaling American Basketball League's rules of play (which involved three 15-minute periods) instead of what would eventually become the NBL's own standard time period of four 10-minute quarters.

== Team standings ==
=== Eastern Division ===
Pos.	Eastern Division	Wins	Losses	Win %
1	Akron Firestone Non-Skids	14	4	.778
2	Akron Goodyear Wingfoots	13	5	.722
3	Pittsburgh Pirates	8	5	.615
4	Buffalo Bisons	3	6	.333
5	Warren Penns	3	9	.250
6	Columbus Athletic Supply	1	12	.091

=== Western Division ===
Pos	Western Division	Wins	Losses	Win %
1	Oshkosh All-Stars	12	2	.857
2	Whiting Ciesar All-Americans	12	3	.800
3	Fort Wayne General Electrics	13	7	.650
4	Indianapolis Kautskys	4	9	.308
5	Richmond King Clothiers / Cincinnati Comellos^{‡}	3	7	.300
6	Kankakee Gallagher Trojans	3	11	.214
7	Dayton Metropolitans	2	11	.154
^{‡} Richmond relocated to Cincinnati during the season and assumed Richmond's record in the standings. Richmond's record was 1–2 and Cincinnati's record was 2–5.

== Playoffs ==
The top two teams from each division qualified for the playoffs. Both the division playoffs and the NBL Championship were played under a best-of-three format. The Akron Goodyear Wingfoots upset the Akron Firestone Non-Skids 2–0 in the Eastern Division playoff and the Oshkosh All-Stars 2–1 in the NBL Championship to win the title. The All-Stars had swept the Whiting Ciesar All-Americans 2–0 in the Western Division playoff to qualify for the NBL Championship.

Division Playoffs
E1	Akron Firestone Non-Skids	0
E2	Akron Goodyear Wingfoots	2
W1	Oshkosh All-Stars	2
W2	Whiting Ciesar All-Americans	0

NBL Championship
E2	Akron Goodyear Wingfoots	2
W1	Oshkosh All-Stars	1

- Bold Series winner

== Statistics ==
Leroy Edwards of the Oshkosh All-Stars scored a then league-high 28 points in a single game on February 2, 1938, in a win over the Kankakee Gallagher Trojans. The Columbus Athletic Supply team's 1–12 record stands as the worst winning percentage in NBL history for a team that completed a full season.

=== Leaders ===
Category	Player	Team	Stat
Points	Leroy Edwards	Oshkosh All-Stars	210
Free-Throws	Soup Cable	Akron Firestone Non-Skids	45
Field goals	Leroy Edwards	Oshkosh All-Stars	83

Note: Prior to the 1969–70 NBA season, league leaders in points were determined by totals rather than averages. Rebound and assist statistics as well as shooting percentages were not recorded properly in the NBL.

== Awards ==
- NBL Most Valuable Player: Leroy Edwards, Oshkosh All-Stars
- NBL Coach of the Year: Lefty Byers, Akron Goodyear Wingfoots
- NBL Rookie of the Year: Robert Kessler, Indianapolis Kautskys
- All-NBL First Team:
  - F/C – Scott Armstrong, Fort Wayne General Electrics
  - G/F – Charley Shipp, Akron Goodyear Wingfoots
  - C/F – Leroy Edwards, Oshkosh All-Stars
  - G – Chuck Bloedorn, Akron Goodyear Wingfoots
  - G – John Wooden, Whiting Ciesar All-Americans
- All-NBL Second Team:
  - F – Bart Quinn, Fort Wayne General Electrics
  - F – Robert Kessler, Indianapolis Kautskys
  - C/F – Vince McGowan, Whiting Ciesar All-Americans
  - G/F – Soup Cable, Akron Firestone Non-Skids
  - G/F – Jack Ozburn, Akron Firestone Non-Skids

== See also ==
- National Basketball League (United States)
