= Al Bonniwell =

American basketball player (1911–2002)

Personal information
- Born: October 6, 1911 Wayne, Pennsylvania, U.S.
- Died: March 8, 2002 (aged 90) Arlington, Virginia, U.S.
- Listed height: 6 ft 1 in (1.85 m)
- Listed weight: 175 lb (79 kg)

Career information
- High school: Lower Merion (Ardmore, Pennsylvania)
- College: Dartmouth (1932–1935)
- Playing career: 1937–1939
- Position: Guard / forward

Career history
- 1937–1939: Akron Firestone Non-Skids

Career highlights
- NBL champion (1938); First-team All-American – Helms (1935)

Alfred Eugene Bonniwell (October 6, 1911 – March 8, 2002) was an American basketball player.

== Basketball career ==
An early professional in the National Basketball League, he was also an All-American college player at Dartmouth. Bonniwell played two seasons for the Akron Firestone Non-Skids, averaging 5.1 points per game in 39 contests.

== Post-basketball life ==
Bonniwell served in the U.S. Army in both World War II and the Korean War, and was awarded the Bronze Star. He moved to Alexandria, Virginia in 1961, and retired from the Army in 1967 as a colonel. He then worked as an employment counselor for the Virginia Employment Commission's Falls Church office from 1968 to 1978. He married his wife Maxine (1922–2007) in 1949. They remained married until Al's death, and had two daughters, Linda and Debra, and one son, Ronald. In 2010, Bonniwell was posthumously inducted into the Lower Merion High School Basketball Hall of Fame, as the first alumnus of the school to play professional basketball.
