= Leroy Edwards =

American basketball player (1914–1971)

- Edwards was one of the first true "stars" of professional basketball in the United States

Personal information
- Born: April 11, 1914 Crawfordsville, Indiana, U.S.
- Died: August 25, 1971 (aged 57) Lawrence, Indiana, U.S.
- Listed height: 6 ft 5 in (1.96 m)
- Listed weight: 210 lb (95 kg)

Career information
- High school: Arsenal Technical (Indianapolis, Indiana)
- College: Kentucky (1934–1935)
- Playing career: 1935–1949
- Position: Center
- Number: 23, 25, 29

Career history
- 1935–1936: Indianapolis U.S. Tires
- 1937–1949: Oshkosh All-Stars

Career highlights
- 2× NBL champion (1941, 1942); 3× NBL Most Valuable Player (1938–1940); 6× All-NBL First Team (1938–1942, 1945); 2× All-NBL Second Team (1943, 1946); 3× NBL scoring champion (1938–1940); WPBT champion (1942); 3× All-WPBT Tournament First team (1939, 1940, 1946); Consensus All-American (1935); Helms College Player of the Year (1935); NBL All-Time Team; All-Time Pro Stars First Team (1945)

Leroy Harry Edwards (April 11, 1914 – August 25, 1971) was an American basketball player. He played professionally for Oshkosh All-Stars of the National Basketball League and is widely regarded as one of the greatest players of the pre-NBA era. His nicknames included "Cowboy" and "Lefty".

Edwards was an NCAA All-American at the University of Kentucky. Edwards played his first year after college for the Indianapolis U.S. Tires in the Midwest Basketball Conference, the predecessor to the NBL. In 1936, he signed his first pro contract with the Oshkosh All-Stars, where he played for thirteen years. In an era and league where scoring was considerably lower (owing to having no shot clock and slower play), Edwards helped the All-Stars to two NBL championships while winning the Most Valuable Player award three times and being an All-NBL selection eight times (six First Team, two Second Team). Edwards scored 3,221 career points, which ranks second in NBL history behind only Bobby McDermott. Edwards retired in 1949, the same year the NBL ceased operations by merging with the BAA to form the NBA.

== High school ==
Edwards was a 6 ft 5 in (1.96 m) center who starred at Arsenal Technical High School in Indianapolis, Indiana. Back then, he was known as the "East Side Terror", and it was between his sophomore and junior years that he learned how to do a hook shot after watching a barn-storming basketball team perform the feat. He played for the varsity team in 1930–31, 1931–32 and 1932–33, leading the team in scoring his final two seasons while also helping to win the Indianapolis City Crown all three of his varsity seasons. Edwards was an all-state player who twice led the North Central Conference in scoring and also led Arsenal to the state quarterfinals as a junior in an era when there were no divisional breakdowns based on school enrollment. In his senior season of 1932–33, Arsenal Tech lost in the sectional final against Shortridge High School, a team they had beaten twice during the regular season, but still finished the year with a 22–3 record.

== College ==
Edwards played one season of varsity basketball at the University of Kentucky. Due to NCAA rules, college freshmen were not allowed to play varsity sports at the time. As a freshman in 1933–34, he set a college scoring record 24 points per game in 17 games as he guided the Kentucky freshmen team to an undefeated season.

In 1934–35, his sophomore year and his first of varsity eligibility, he led the Wildcats to a 19–2 record. Averaging nearly 20 ppg, he set a single season point record that lasted until 1947 when teams began playing more games each season. One loss was to a very good Michigan State squad (32–26) and the other to New York University (NYU) at the old Madison Square Garden.

=== NYU game ===
NYU and Kentucky were considered the best two college teams in the country at that time and playing for the national championship. A then-record 16,500 fans attended the match. A controversy occurred when sports writers said that Kentucky would have won this game if the two NYU players who were hanging onto Edwards throughout the game had fouls called on them. NYU won the game, 23–22.

=== Three-second rule ===
Edwards is generally recognized as the player responsible for the implementation of the three-second rule. Enacted in 1936, it was originally designed to limit rough play near the basket. The rule limits the time players can remain in the area in front of the basket known as the "paint" or free-throw lane. The rule has been modified and is still used today.

=== Early exit ===
In a different game that season, Edwards set another college basketball record, scoring 34 points against Creighton University, which was a Kentucky record for 15 years. After coach Adolph Rupp's retirement in 1972 he was asked who was the best center he had ever seen play the game and his answer was Leroy Edwards. He said Edwards was the strongest player that he ever coached and he played above the rim. Edwards, selected to the First Team All-Southeastern Conference, was also named the Helms Athletic Foundation National College Player of the Year. Edwards left the University of Kentucky after just his sophomore year—an extremely rare decision for basketball players during that era—to start what would become an historical professional basketball career.

== Professional career ==
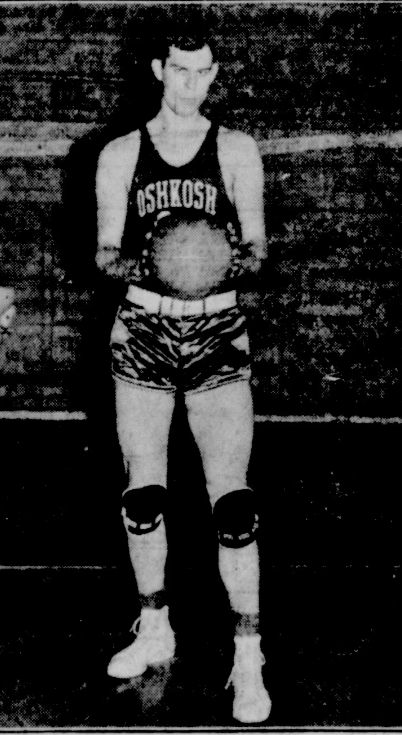
By 1938, Edwards and his dominant frame were considered among the best in the pros, with one outlet calling him "one of the best in the art of screening and ball handling"

When Edwards decided to play professional basketball he was considered the premier player in the country. In what was his first season of professional play, Edwards would play for the Indianapolis U.S. Tires (owned by U.S. Tire, Inc.) in the Midwest Basketball Conference (a predecessor to the National Basketball League, which itself has ties to the modern-day National Basketball Association), though he would also be loaned out to the inner city rivaling Indianapolis Kautskys for a few independent matches, notably against barnstorming teams like the Philadelphia Sphas and a February 1936 game against the New York Renaissance. In 1936 he signed his first pro contract with the Oshkosh All-Stars, a team in Wisconsin that played in the National Basketball League (NBL). This league was the forerunner to the National Basketball Association (NBA). He played for them from 1936 to 1949.

He was a prolific scorer with either hand, left or right, could shoot from the outside and was an excellent defensive player. He accomplished so much at a time when game scores and point totals were much lower than today. In those days, the actual playing time was shorter. The game had 15–17 minute halves and no 24 second shot clock. Play was slower and teams would play zone defense and hold on to the ball for long periods of time, making it very difficult for a player to score many points in a game. Today, NBA games consist of four 12 minute quarters and each team takes over 75 shots per game.

Edwards held a number of game scoring records. He was the first professional basketball player to score 30 and 35 points in a game, with the former occurring on February 8, 1938, against the Kankakee Gallagher Trojans and the latter occurring against the Fort Wayne Zollner Pistons on March 5, 1942. He led the NBL in scoring his first three years and in 1939 he led the league in every recorded offensive statistic. He ended his career as the second highest scorer in National Basketball League history.

During Edwards's 12-year NBL career, he was selected to the NBL First Team All-League six times and the Second Team All-League twice. He was also the League MVP three times. Oshkosh won the league championship six times and participated in nine of ten World Professional Basketball Tournament events held in Chicago between 1939 and 1948. Edwards' team had the best record of all teams that were invited to the World Professional Basketball Tournament, winning 20 games and losing 10. The Oshkosh All Stars were crowned the World Professional Basketball Tournament champions in Chicago in 1942, and Edwards was the all-time leading point scorer in the tournaments history. On February 14, 1945, United Press International recognized him as one of the Top 5 Basketball Players of All Time.

=== New York Rens rivalry ===
The New York Renaissance (Rens, for short) was the best black team of the era 1920–1940s. As in most sports, times were very difficult for black players. Nevertheless, the Rens were an excellent team with quality players; their record for the 1939 season was 112 wins and 7 losses. The epitome of their success came that year in Chicago at the first World Professional Basketball Tournament. The Rens had reached the finals and were playing the Oshkosh All-Stars. Oshkosh was favored because with Edwards at center, the All-Stars had beaten the Rens 7 out of 10 games they had played during the previous two years. That night the Rens beat Oshkosh 34–25. Edwards was the leading scorer of the tournament, scoring 49 points in three games, including a 12-point performance in the final.

In total, the New York Rens and Oshkosh All-Stars played each other 33 times, with Oshkosh holding the edge with 17 wins. The entire New York Rens team is in the Naismith Basketball Hall of Fame. Their team played over 3000 games and won 85% of them.

John Isaacs, a member of the Hall of Fame Rens team, was asked about Edwards. His comments were that Edwards was a great player who could play in any era. Isaacs also said that Edwards never complained to the officials during a game and would play hard. He added that Hall of Famer Tarzan Cooper and Edwards would talk to each other during the games. He recalled one game when Edwards said something to Cooper about a rough move that he made. Cooper responded by quipping 'who do you think I learned it from?'

=== George Mikan match-ups ===
Hall of Fame center George Mikan of the Chicago Gears and the Minneapolis Lakers, who stood 6 ft 10 in (2.08 m), was named the best basketball player from 1900 to 1950 by the National Association of Basketball Coaches (NABC). Mikan, however, did not get the opportunity to play against Edwards when Edwards was in his prime. They played against each other when Edwards was older and having chronic knee problems. Still, whenever they met on the court Edwards usually had the upper hand. Mikan later wrote in his book that Edwards was 6 ft 8 in (2.03 m) tall, weighed 260 lbs. and was the strongest player in professional basketball (although those measurements are exaggerated). When Mikan was asked who was the best player he ever faced he did not hesitate to say that it was Leroy Edwards.

Hall of Famer Ray Meyer, Mikan's coach at DePaul University, wrote that Edwards was not merely a good basketball player, but a great one. Meyer was impressed with his agility. Edwards, he wrote, had a great move with his back to the basket. He would turn left, dribble with his right hand and he'd use his left hand to push the defender out of the way. As long as his move wasn't too obvious, the ref would not call a foul. Meyer said this was the first time he ever saw that move.

== Later years and death ==
Edwards died of a heart attack on August 25, 1971, at roughly 7:30 p.m., at the age of 57 at his home in Lawrence, Indiana while mowing his yard. His wife and bystanders attempted to resuscitate him, but were unsuccessful, and he was pronounced dead at arrival at the hospital. He had been an employee of Chrysler's Indianapolis plant before his death.

== Legacy ==
Whether Leroy Edwards was playing college basketball for Kentucky or professionally against the New York Renaissance, Harlem Globetrotters or the Fort Wayne Zollner Pistons, he contributed to basketball's development and popularity in the United States. He excited fans in an era without television coverage and very little radio publicity. Leroy Edwards also had the distinction alongside Charley Shipp of being the only players in the entire history of the National Basketball League to end up playing in all twelve seasons of the NBL (as well as the two precursor years in the Midwest Basketball Conference), with Edwards notably spending his entire time in the NBL with the Oshkosh All-Stars before they ended up expiring as a franchise following the NBL's merger with the Basketball Association of America to become the modern-day National Basketball Association. Edwards, a pioneer of basketball, is in the Indiana Basketball Hall of Fame, Helms Athletic Foundation Hall of Fame and the University of Kentucky's Athletics Hall of Fame. Despite being a nominee numerous times, Edwards has yet to be inducted in the Naismith Basketball Hall of Fame.

== Career statistics ==
Legend
GP	Games played	FGM	Field goals made
FTM	Free throws made	FTA	Free throws attempted
FT%	Free throw percentage	PTS	Total points
PPG	Points per game	**Bold**	Career high

†	Denotes seasons in which Edwards's team won an NBL championship
*	Led the league
‡	Denotes NBL record

=== NBL ===
==== Regular season ====
Year	Team	GP	FGM	FTM	FTA	FT%	PTS	PPG
1937–38	Oshkosh	13	83*	44	63	.698	210*	**16.2***
1938–39	Oshkosh	28*	124*	86*	118	**.729**	334*	11.9*
1939–40	Oshkosh	28*	111	139*	203	.685	361*	12.9*
1940–41†	Oshkosh	23	57	76*	121	.628	190	8.3
1941–42†	Oshkosh	24*	85	92			262	10.9
1942–43	Oshkosh	23	74	72	103	.699	220	9.6
1943–44	Oshkosh	19	48	52	92	.565	148	7.8
1944–45	Oshkosh	30*	125	157			407	13.6
1945–46	Oshkosh	34*	120	119*	200	.595	359	10.6
1946–47	Oshkosh	44	**135**	**144**	**222**	.649	**414**	9.4
1947–48	Oshkosh	**46**	76	142	205	.693	294	6.4
1948–49	Oshkosh	10	7	8	20	.400	22	2.2
Career		322	1,045	1,131‡	1,347	.655	3,221	10.0

==== Playoffs ====
Year	Team	GP	FGM	FTM	FTA	FT%	PTS	PPG
1938	Oshkosh	5	24	21			69	13.8
1939	Oshkosh	5	23	24			70	14.0
1940	Oshkosh	**8**	**33**	**27**			**93**	11.6
1941†	Oshkosh	5	23	25			71	14.2
1942†	Oshkosh	5	30	23			83	**16.6**
1943	Oshkosh	2	8	8			24	12.0
1944	Oshkosh	3	6	5			17	5.7
1946	Oshkosh	5	15	14	21	**.667**	44	8.8
1947	Oshkosh	6	7	3	14	.214	17	2.8
1948	Oshkosh	4	13	15	**23**	.652	41	10.3
1949	Oshkosh	6	7	5	11	.455	19	3.2
Career		54	189	170	69	.536	548	10.1

== Awards and accolades ==
The following is a more comprehensive list of Edwards' myriad awards, accolades and records than could reasonably be placed in an infobox. (Sources)

=== Indianapolis Arsenal Tech ===
- 3× Arsenal Tech team were Indianapolis City tournament champions
- 2× team's leading scorer
- 2× All-North Central Conference
- 2× All-State

=== College ===
- School freshman scoring record 24 points per game (over 400 points)
- School single game scoring record (34 points) in a game against Creighton, a record which stood until 1949
- Leading scorer in the South (343 points) in 1935
- 343 points scored in 21 games was the highest season points scored by a Kentucky player until 1947, when it was broken in a 37-game season
- Points per game average of 16.3 was the highest per game average of any Kentucky player until 1945
- 1935 Consensus All-American (Helms 1st Team, Converse 2nd Team)
- Credited with the introduction of the 3-second rule, which forbid an offensive player from remaining inside the free-throw lane (with or without the ball) for longer than three seconds; this rule was instituted in 1936
- 1930s All-Decade Team selection by the National Association of Basketball Coaches (NABC)
- Madison Square Garden All-Decade Team (1934–1943)
- Associated Press All-Time Collegiate Team (as of February 1943)
- Adolph Rupp's All-Star Kentucky Squad (1930–1972) as named in John McGill's book Kentucky Sports

=== Professional ===
- 6× NBL Western Division championships with the Oshkosh All-Stars: 1938, 1939, 1940, 1941, 1942, 1946
- 2× NBL championships: 1941, 1942
- Scored a record 30 points in game against Kankakee (first NBL player to score 30+ points in a professional game) in 1937–38
- 3× NBL scoring leader: 1938 (16.2 ppg), 1939 (11.9 ppg), 1940 (12.9 ppg)
- 3× NBL MVP: 1938, 1939, 1940
- 6× All-NBL First Team: 1938, 1939, 1940, 1941, 1942, 1945
- 2× All-NBL Second Team: 1943, 1946
- In 1938–39, lead league in every recorded offensive statistic
- World Professional Basketball Tournament champion (1942)
- 3× World Professional Basketball Tournament (WPBL) All-Tournament First Team: 1939, 1940, 1946
- All-time leading scorer in WPBL history
- All-time NBL League team honoree
- Second in all-time scoring in the NBL (3,221 points in 322 games for an average of 10.0 ppg)

=== Career ===
- United Press International selection as one of top 5 greatest professional players all-time (1945)
- Helms Athletic Foundation Basketball Hall of Fame inductee (1971)
- Indiana Basketball Hall of Fame inductee (1975)
- Indiana Sports Hall of Fame inductee (2024)
- Association of Professional Basketball Researchers (APBR's) Top-100 Professional Basketball Players of the 20th Century
- University of Kentucky's Athletics Hall of Fame inductee (2012)

== See also ==
- Honored Kentucky Wildcats men's basketball players
