= Harry Sorensen (basketball) =

American basketball player

Personal information
- Born: March 27, 1914 Hardy, Nebraska, U.S.
- Died: April 28, 1991 (aged 77) Quincy, Illinois, U.S.
- Listed height: 6 ft 4 in (1.93 m)
- Listed weight: 200 lb (91 kg)

Career information
- High school: Hardy (Hardy, Nebraska)
- College: Nebraska (1934–1937)
- Position: Power forward / center

Career history
- 1939–1941: Akron Firestone Non-Skids

Career highlights
- NBL champion (1940)

Harry Louis Sorensen (March 27, 1914 – April 28, 1991) was an American professional basketball player. He played for the Akron Firestone Non-Skids in the National Basketball League for two seasons and averaged 1.6 points per game.

Sorensen served in the Army in World War II. He then worked for Firestone in Ravenna, Ohio before the company transferred him to Decatur, Illinois, where he was employed until retirement in 1976.
