= Bobby McDermott =

American basketball player (1914–1963)

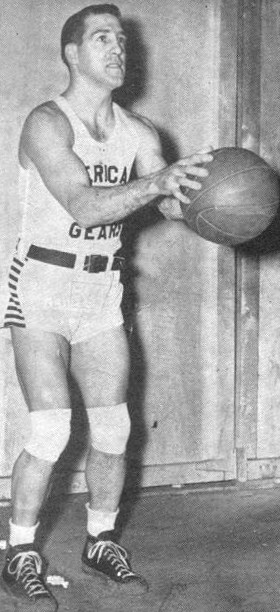

Personal information
- Born: January 7, 1914 Queens, New York, U.S.
- Died: October 3, 1963 (aged 49) Yonkers, New York, U.S.
- Listed height: 6 ft 0 in (1.83 m)
- Listed weight: 185 lb (84 kg)

Career information
- Playing career: 1934–1950
- Position: Guard

Career history

Playing
- 1933–1934: Long Island Imperials
- 1934–1936: Brooklyn Visitations
- 1936: Brooklyn Jewels
- 1936–1939: New York Celtics
- 1939–1940: Baltimore Clippers
- 1940–1941: Troy / Brooklyn Celtics
- 1941–1946: Fort Wayne Zollner Pistons
- 1946–1947: Chicago American Gears
- 1947: Sheboygan Red Skins
- 1947–1949: Tri-Cities Blackhawks
- 1949: Hammond Calumet Buccaneers
- 1949–1950: Wilkes-Barre Barons
- 1950: Grand Rapids Hornets

Career highlights
- As player: ABL champion (1935); 3× NBL champion (1944, 1945, 1947); 5× NBL Most Valuable Player (1942–1946); 6× All-NBL First Team (1942–1947); All-NBL Second Team (1948); NBL scoring champion (1943); NBL all-time leading scorer; NBL All-Time Team; NBL All-Time Greatest Player; 3× WPBT champion (1944–1946); WPBT MVP (1944); 3× All-WPBT First Team (1944–1946); 2× All-WPBT Second Team (1943, 1948); All-Time Pro Stars First Team (1945); As head coach: 3× NBL champion (1944, 1945, 1947); 2× NBL Coach of the Year (1944, 1945)
- Basketball Hall of Fame

Robert Frederick McDermott (January 7, 1914 – October 3, 1963) was an American professional basketball player in the 1930s and 1940s. He was known as an outstanding shooter and has been called "the greatest long-distance shooter in the history of the game" by contemporaries. His grandson is businessman Bill McDermott. McDermott was named to the Naismith Memorial Basketball Hall of Fame in 1988.

== Professional basketball career ==
McDermott dropped out of Flushing High School after just one year there, and was picked up by the Brooklyn Visitations after making a name for himself on the playgrounds (starting with him playing for the Whitestone Separates Juniors semipro basketball team at 15 years old) and the independently ran Long Island Imps team. He continued that trend in the American Basketball League. He led the league in scoring, and helped Brooklyn win the 1934-35 ABL championship against the dominant Philadelphia Sphas in their prime. He spent a year in the New York Professional League where he set a playoff record for most points with 32. He played with the recently reorganized Original Celtics for the next three years.

He went back to the ABL and was again the league's scoring leader, returned to the Celtics for another season, then settled down for a while with the Ft. Wayne Zollner Pistons of the National Basketball League in 1941. From 1941 to 1946 he was at his peak. He improved his shot and for the first time, his free throw percentage rose near or around 80%. He continued to get more accurate and dangerous while keeping his legendary range. The Pistons won over 80% of their games and made four consecutive NBL finals appearances. They won NBL titles in 1944 and 1945, as well as the World Professional Basketball Tournament in Chicago. At the same time, his popularity soared, and he appeared at a war bond rally alongside Jack Dempsey and Martha Raye.

McDermott became a player-coach during 1946. He took up the same position when he moved to the Chicago American Gears. On the American Gears, he was teamed with the biggest inside threat in the league, George Mikan. They won the 1946–47 NBL championship together. Though he would continue to play professionally for several more years, McDermott's last year with the American Gears was his final year of stardom on a winning team.

The American Gears joined the Professional Basketball League of America in 1947. But when that league folded in November 1947, after only three weeks of existence, the American Gears players were distributed among NBL teams. McDermott landed with the Sheboygan Red Skins, with whom he was a player-coach for about a month. He scored 138 points in 16 games and coached the Red Skins to a 4–5 record.

Doxie Moore regained the coaching reins after McDermott left to join the Tri-Cities Blackhawks, where he coached and played for the next season and a half, compiling a 20–18 record. On the Blackhawks, McDermott continued to be renowned for his physical play, and was tied for the team lead in scoring at 12.1 points per game with Whitey Von Nieda. That postseason, McDermott led the Blackhawks past the Indianapolis Kautskys in the opening round, before losing to the eventual champion Minneapolis Lakers in the semifinals. The following season, he was replaced as coach by Roger Potter halfway through the year.

McDermott would next play for the Hammond Calumet Buccaneers, during their only year of existence, and then the Wilkes-Barre Barons, both of whom would make the playoffs of their leagues before being eliminated in the first round. His final season playing professionally, during which he was again a player-coach, came with the Grand Rapids Hornets in 1950. McDermott was fired midseason after a profanity-filled coaching performance in Casper, Wyoming during which the Hornets lost, and the franchise folded only a month later.

McDermott died in 1963, due to injuries he suffered in a car accident on September 23. He was 49 years old. He had been employed at Yonkers Raceway at the time of his death.

== Accolades ==
McDermott was the World Professional Basketball Tournament MVP in 1944 and was named the NBL MVP in five consecutive seasons during the 1940s. In 1946 the NBL named McDermott the greatest player in league history. Collier's magazine chose him to an "All-World" team in 1950.

McDermott was named to the Naismith Memorial Basketball Hall of Fame in 1988.
