= Paul DuCharme =

American basketball player

Personal information
- Born: August 27, 1917 St. Anne, Illinois, U.S.
- Died: October 12, 1985 (aged 68) Akron, Ohio, U.S.
- Listed height: 5 ft 11 in (1.80 m)
- Listed weight: 160 lb (73 kg)

Career information
- High school: Mount Carmel (Chicago, Illinois)
- College: Notre Dame (1936–1939)
- Position: Guard

Career history
- 1940: Akron Firestone Non-Skids

Paul Edmund DuCharme (August 27, 1917 – October 12, 1985) was an American professional basketball player. He served in the United States Navy during World War II. He played in the National Basketball League for the Akron Firestone Non-Skids in three games during the 1940–41 season and averaged 0.3 points per game.
