= Tommy O'Brien (basketball) =

American basketball player

Personal information
- Born: February 16, 1916 New York, U.S.
- Died: November 17, 1955 (aged 39) El Paso, Texas, U.S.
- Listed height: 5 ft 8 in (1.73 m)
- Listed weight: 165 lb (75 kg)

Career information
- High school: Union Hill (Union City, New Jersey)
- College: George Washington (1935–1938)
- Position: Shooting guard / small forward

Career history
- 1938–1940: Jersey Reds
- 1939–1941: Akron Firestone Non-Skids
- 1941–1942: Akron Shulan

Career highlights
- NBL champion (1940)

Thomas William O'Brien (February 16, 1916 – November 17, 1955) was an American professional basketball player. He played for the Akron Firestone Non-Skids in the National Basketball League for two seasons and averaged 1.9 points per game.

O'Brien died on November 17, 1955, due to nephrosclerosis.
