= Vince McGowan =

American basketball player

Personal information
- Born: August 13, 1913 Illinois
- Died: April 4, 1982 (aged 68) Evergreen Park, Illinois
- Listed height: 6 ft 6 in (1.98 m)
- Listed weight: 208 lb (94 kg)

Career information
- High school: St. Leo (Chicago, Illinois)
- College: Loyola Chicago (193?–193?); DePaul (193?–1935)
- Playing career: 1933–1949
- Position: Forward / center

Career history
- 1933–1934: Schuessler Athletic Club
- 1934–1935: Lifeschultz Fast Freights
- 1934–1935: Oshkosh All-Stars
- 1935–1936: Chicago Englewood
- 1936: Chicago Duffy Florals
- 1936–1940: Whiting/Hammond Ciesar All-Americans
- 1939–1940: Chicago Harmons
- 1940–1942: Chicago Bruins
- 1941–1942: Toledo White Huts
- 1943–1944: Chicago Gears
- 1944–1945: Chicago American Gears
- 1946–1949: Chicago Shamrocks

Career highlights
- All-NBL Second Team (1938)

Vincent J. McGowan (August 13, 1913 – April 4, 1982) was an American professional basketball player. He played in the National Basketball League for several teams, including the Whiting/Hammond Ciesar All-Americans, Chicago Bruins, and Chicago American Gears. McGowan was a second-team all-NBL selection in 1937–38. For his career he averaged 5.3 points per game.

McGowan was the son of Anthony and Mary E. McGowan. He married Virginia K. Green. They had four children: Catherine, Vincent, Patrick and Paul. He died on April 4, 1982 at the age of 68.
