= 1938 NCAA Men's Basketball All-Americans =

- Awarded for: 1937–38 NCAA men's basketball season

The consensus 1938 College Basketball All-American team, as determined by aggregating the results of four major All-American teams. To earn "consensus" status, a player must win honors from a majority of the following teams: the Helms Athletic Foundation, Converse, the Newspaper Enterprise Association (NEA), and Madison Square Garden.

== 1938 Consensus All-America team ==
Consensus Team
| Player | Class | Team |
|---|---|---|
| Meyer Bloom | Senior | Temple |
| Hank Luisetti | Senior | Stanford |
| John Moir | Senior | Notre Dame |
| Paul Nowak | Senior | Notre Dame |
| Fred Pralle | Senior | Kansas |
| Jewell Young | Senior | Purdue |

== Individual All-America teams ==
All-America Team
| All-America Team | First team | | Second team | | Third team | |
| All-America Team | Player | School | Player | School | Player | School |
|---|---|---|---|---|---|---|
| Helms | Meyer Bloom | Temple | No second or third teams | | | |
| Helms | Bonnie Graham | Mississippi | No second or third teams | | | |
| Helms | Hubert Kirkpatrick | Baylor | No second or third teams | | | |
| Helms | Hank Luisetti | Stanford | No second or third teams | | | |
| Helms | John Moir | Notre Dame | No second or third teams | | | |
| Helms | Paul Nowak | Notre Dame | No second or third teams | | | |
| Helms | John O'Brien | Columbia | No second or third teams | | | |
| Helms | Fred Pralle | Kansas | No second or third teams | | | |
| Helms | Ignatius Volpe | Manhattan | No second or third teams | | | |
| Helms | Jewell Young | Purdue | No second or third teams | | | |
| Converse | Hank Luisetti | Stanford | Ernie Andres | Indiana | Meyer Bloom | Temple |
| Converse | John Moir | Notre Dame | Chuck Chuckovits | Toledo | Pick Dehner | Illinois |
| Converse | Fred Pralle | Kansas | Mike Novak | Loyola (IL) | Earl Keth | Central Missouri St. |
| Converse | John Townsend | Michigan | Martin Rolek | Minnesota | Red McCrocklin | Western Kentucky St. |
| Converse | Jewell Young | Purdue | Bob Spessard | Washington and Lee | Slim Wintermute | Oregon |
| NEA | Bernie Fliegel | CCNY | Ernie Andres | Indiana | No third team | |
| NEA | Hank Luisetti | Stanford | Meyer Bloom | Temple | No third team | |
| NEA | Paul Nowak | Notre Dame | Chuck Chuckovits | Toledo | No third team | |
| NEA | Fred Pralle | Kansas | Hubert Kirkpatrick | Baylor | No third team | |
| NEA | Jewell Young | Purdue | John Moir | Notre Dame | No third team | |
| Madison Square Garden | Meyer Bloom | Temple | Kit Carson | Washington and Lee | No third team | |
| Madison Square Garden | Lou Boudreau | Illinois | Matt Guokas | St. Joseph's | No third team | |
| Madison Square Garden | Hank Luisetti | Stanford | Don Henderson | Temple | No third team | |
| Madison Square Garden | John Moir | Notre Dame | Bobby Neu | DePaul | No third team | |
| Madison Square Garden | Paul Nowak | Notre Dame | Art Stoefen | Stanford | No third team | |

== See also ==
- 1937–38 NCAA men's basketball season
