= Tom Wukovits =

American basketball player

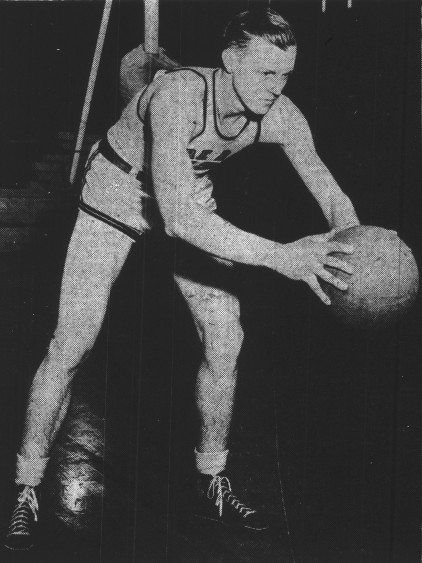
- Wukovits, circa 1937

Personal information
- Born: February 4, 1916 South Bend, Indiana, U.S.
- Died: November 12, 1991 (aged 75) Charlotte, Florida, U.S.
- Listed height: 5 ft 11 in (1.80 m)
- Listed weight: 165 lb (75 kg)

Career information
- High school: Riley (South Bend, Indiana)
- College: Notre Dame (1935–1938)
- Position: Guard

Career history
- 1939–1941: Akron Firestone Non-Skids
- 1941: Toledo Jim White Chevrolets
- 1944–1946: Cleveland Allmen Transfers

Career highlights
- NBL champion (1940)

Thomas William Wukovits (February 4, 1916 – November 12, 1991) was an American professional basketball player. He played in the National Basketball League for several teams in the 1930s and 1940s, including the Akron Firestone Non-Skids, Toledo Jim White Chevrolets, and Cleveland Allmen Transfers. In 109 career games he averaged 6.3 points per game. Wukovits won an NBL championship in 1939–40 with Akron.
