= Bob Hassmiller =

American basketball player (1916–1980)

Personal information
- Born: December 17, 1916 Bayonne, New Jersey, U.S.
- Died: September 8, 1980 (aged 63) Akron, Ohio, U.S.
- Listed height: 6 ft 1 in (1.85 m)
- Listed weight: 185 lb (84 kg)

Career information
- High school: Bayonne (Bayonne, New Jersey)
- College: Fordham (1936–1939)
- Playing career: 1939–1942
- Position: Guard

Career history
- 1939–1941: Akron Firestone Non-Skids
- 1941–1942: Toledo Jim White Chevrolets

Career highlights
- NBL champion (1940); Consensus second-team All-American (1939)

Robert Vincent Hassmiller (December 17, 1916 – September 8, 1980) was a college basketball All-American at Fordham University (1936–1939) and professional basketball player in the National Basketball League (1939–1942). As a senior in 1938–39, Hassmiller was the team captain and guided the Rams to a 10–8 overall record.
