= Slim Shoun =

American basketball player

Personal information
- Born: October 4, 1904 California, U.S.
- Died: October 10, 1983 (aged 79) Akron, Ohio, U.S.
- Listed height: 6 ft 11 in (2.11 m)
- Listed weight: 210 lb (95 kg)

Career information
- High school: Johnson County (Johnson County, Tennessee)
- College: Carson–Newman (1923–1927)
- Playing career: 1927–1940
- Position: Center

Career history
- 1927–1928: Chicago Bruins / Fort Wayne Hoosiers
- 1928–1929: Akron Firestone Non-Skids
- 1929–1930: Columbus Robert Lees
- 1930–1940: Akron Firestone Non-Skids

Career highlights
- NPBL champion (1933); NBL champion (1939)

Milas Baxter "Slim" Shoun (October 4, 1904 – October 10, 1983) was an American professional basketball player. He played for the Akron Firestone Non-Skids in the National Basketball League and averaged 2.0 points per game. After his basketball career he remained at the Firestone Tire and Rubber Company for 42 years. He was the brother of Major League Baseball player Clyde Shoun.
