= NBL (United States) Coach of the Year Award =

The National Basketball League Coach of the Year Award was an annual National Basketball League (NBL) award given to the top head coach of the regular season in each of the twelve years the league existed. The Coach of the Year was selected by sports writers, broadcasters, coaches, and managers. Through the 1945–46 season every coach that would win the NBL's Coach of the Year Award also subsequently lead his team to the NBL championship. Following that season's end, Lon Darling of the Oshkosh All-Stars, Murray Mendenhall of the Anderson Duffey Packers, and Al Cervi of the Syracuse Nationals would be named the final winners of the NBL's Coach of the Year Award, though they wouldn't win the NBL championship in the subsequent years they earned that honor in question. The Oshkosh All-Stars had the most seasons where a coach of theirs earned that honor with it happening to them three different times, while the most honors for a head coach occurred three different times with Paul Sheeks of the Akron Firestone Non-Skids, Bobby McDermott of the Fort Wayne Zollner Pistons, and Lon Darling of the Oshkosh All-Stars each earning the award twice in their careers (Darling being the only one earning it in non-consecutive years). Sheeks, McDermott, and Darlins would end up earning the NBL's Coach of the Year Award for half of the years the NBL existed as a league.

Among the winners were three future Basketball Hall of Famers: Al Cervi (1985), Les Harrison (1980), and Bobby McDermott (1988).

== Winners ==
*	Inducted into the Naismith Memorial Basketball Hall of Fame
†	Denotes coach whose team won championship that year
Coach (X)	Denotes the number of times the coach had been named COY at that time
Team (X)	Denotes the number of times a coach from this team had won at that time
W–L	Win–loss record for that season
Win%	Winning percentage for that season

Season	Coach	Team	W–L	Win%
1937–38†	Lefty Byers	Akron Goodyear Wingfoots	13–5	.722
1938–39†	Paul Sheeks	Akron Firestone Non-Skids	24–3	.889
1939–40†	Paul Sheeks (2)	Akron Firestone Non-Skids (2)	19–9	.679
1940–41†	George Hotchkiss	Oshkosh All-Stars	18–6	.750
1941–42†	Lon Darling	Oshkosh All-Stars (2)	20–4	.833
1942–43†	Carl Roth	Sheboygan Red Skins	12–11	.522
1943–44†	Bobby McDermott*	Fort Wayne Zollner Pistons	18–4	.818
1944–45†	Bobby McDermott* (2)	Fort Wayne Zollner Pistons (2)	25–5	.833
1945–46†	Les Harrison*	Rochester Royals	24–10	.706
1946–47	Lon Darling (2)	Oshkosh All-Stars (3)	28–16	.636
1947–48	Murray Mendenhall	Anderson Duffey Packers	42–18	.700
1948–49	Al Cervi*	Syracuse Nationals	40–23	.635

== See also ==
- NBA Coach of the Year Award
