= Jewell Young =

American basketball player and coach

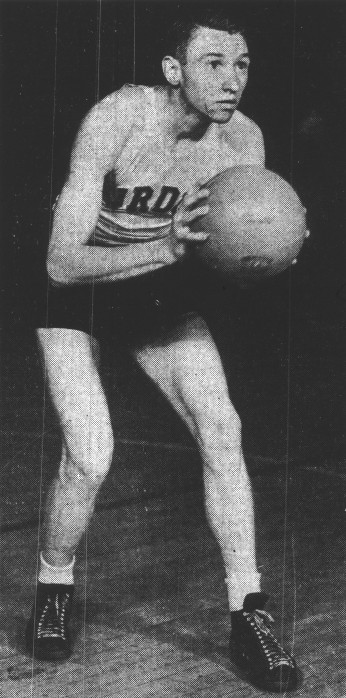
- Young, circa 1938

Personal information
- Born: January 18, 1913 Hedrick, Indiana, U.S.
- Died: April 16, 2003 (aged 90) Bradenton, Florida, U.S.
- Listed height: 6 ft 0 in (1.83 m)
- Listed weight: 160 lb (73 kg)

Career information
- High school: Jefferson (Lafayette, Indiana)
- College: Purdue (1935–1938)
- Playing career: 1938–1946
- Position: Forward

Career history
- 1938–1942: Indianapolis Kautskys
- 1942–1943: Oshkosh All-Stars
- 1946: Indianapolis Kautskys

Career highlights
- 2× All-NBL Second Team (1939, 1942); NBL Rookie of the Year (1939); 2× Consensus All-American (1937, 1938)

Jewell Isaac Young (January 18, 1913 – April 16, 2003) was an American basketball player. He was an All-American at Purdue University and an early professional.

Young played at Lafayette Jefferson High School in Lafayette, Indiana and played collegiately at nearby Purdue University for future Hall of Fame coach Ward "Piggy" Lambert. Young was a two-time consensus All-American at Purdue in 1937 and 1938. He led the Western Conference both years at 14.3 and 15.3 points per game respectively.

Following the completion of his collegiate career, Young played professionally with the Indianapolis Kautskys of the National Basketball League until the Kautskys ceased operations in 1942 due to World War II. Young played one season with the Oshkosh All-Stars in 1942–43, then completed his NBL career with the Kautskys in 1946. In his five NBL seasons, he averaged 7.8 points per game. He was the league Rookie of the Year in 1938–39 and was an NBL All-Star in 1938–39 and in 1941–42 He later became a high school coach for 17 years for Southport High School in Indianapolis.

Young was inducted into the Indiana Basketball Hall of Fame in 1964.
