= Whitey Von Nieda =

American basketball player and coach (1922–2023)

Personal information
- Born: June 19, 1922 Ephrata, Pennsylvania, U.S.
- Died: September 6, 2023 (aged 101) Elizabethtown, Pennsylvania, U.S.
- Listed height: 6 ft 1 in (1.85 m)
- Listed weight: 170 lb (77 kg)

Career information
- High school: Ephrata (Ephrata, Pennsylvania)
- College: Penn State (1942–1943)
- Playing career: 1946–1953, 1978
- Position: Guard / forward
- Number: 6, 4
- Coaching career: 1950–1979

Career history

Playing
- 1946–1947: Lancaster Red Roses
- 1947–1950: Tri-Cities Blackhawks
- 1950: Baltimore Bullets
- 1950–1953; 1978: Lancaster Rockets / Red Roses

Coaching
- 1950–1952: Elizabethtown
- 1950–1953: Lancaster Red Roses
- 1961–1962: Hazleton Hawks
- 1977–1979: Lancaster Red Roses (assistant)

Career highlights
- All-NBL Second Team (1949); All-EPBL Second Team (1951)
- Stats at NBA.com
- Stats at Basketball Reference

Stanley Lee "Whitey" Von Nieda Jr. (June 19, 1922 – September 6, 2023) was an American professional basketball player and coach. He was the longest lived National Basketball Association (NBA) player in history.

== Career ==
Von Nieda played basketball at Ephrata High School and Penn State University. Enlisting in the army during World War II, he played with the paratroopers at Fort Benning, Georgia. There, he led the country, both college and service teams, in scoring with 1062 points in 44 games. After being discharged, he played for the Lancaster Red Roses in the Eastern Basketball League, where he led that league in scoring, averaging more than 24 points per game.

In 1947, he began playing for the Tri-Cities BlackHawks in the National Basketball League (NBL). While with the Blackhawks, he made the All-Rookie team, averaging 12 points a game. His team made it to the final round of the playoffs in both of the years he played there. In 1949, the founding year of the NBA, Von Nieda was traded to the Baltimore Bullets, where he completed the 1949–50 NBA season. In Baltimore, he started every game playing both point guard and shooting guard. Von Nieda was known for his quickness on the court.

After leaving the NBA, he coached at Elizabethtown College for two years. In 1952, he became the player/coach of the Lancaster Red Roses for four years, making it to the finals three of those years. Von Nieda was selected to the All-EPBL Second Team in 1951.

Von Nieda returned to the Red Roses as an assistant coach for the 1977–78 season. On March 27, 1978, he was activated as a player and placed in the starting line-up for a game against the Brooklyn Dodgers that was billed as "Nostalgia Night". Von Nieda played the first four minutes and missed his only field goal attempt.

Again in 1985, he coached Lancaster in the Continental League; these teams were a stepping stone to the NBA. Once again, his team made it to the finals. For many years, he coached junior teams, working with 10- and 12-year-old players and teaching them the fundamentals of basketball.

== Personal life and death ==
Von Nieda resided in Ephrata with his wife Dorothy Bartek Von Nieda with whom he had six children: Timothy, Kurt, Kristen, Heidi, John and Mathew. He turned 100 on June 19, 2022; he was the first NBA player to reach 100 years of age, and thus the longest lived NBA player in history. He died on September 6, 2023, at the age of 101.

== Career statistics ==
Legend
GP	Games played	FGM	Field-goals made
FG%	Field-goal percentage	FTM	Free-throws made
FTA	Free-throws attempted	FT%	Free-throw percentage
APG	Assists per game	PTS	Points
PPG	Points per game	**Bold**	Career high

=== NBL ===
==== Regular season ====
Year	Team	GP	FGM	FTM	FTA	FT%	PTS	PPG
1947–48	Tri-Cities	60	**276**	**174**	**287**	.606	**726**	**12.1**
1948–49	Tri-Cities	**64**	247	147	226	**.650**	641	10.0
Career		124	523	321	513	.626	1,367	11.0

==== Playoffs ====
Year	Team	GP	FGM	FTM	FTA	FT%	PTS	PPG
1948	Tri-Cities	6	**41**	**15**	**28**	.536	**97**	**16.2**
1949	Tri-Cities	6	20	13	24	**.542**	53	8.8
Career		12	61	28	52	.538	150	12.5

=== NBA ===
==== Regular season ====
Year	Team	GP	FG%	FT%	APG	PPG
1949–50	Tri-Cities	26	.345	.630	1.4	4.2
1949–50	Baltimore	**33**	**.364**	**.638**	**3.2**	**6.2**
Career		59	.357	.635	2.4	5.3

== See also ==
- List of centenarians (sportspeople)
