= Paul Nowak (basketball) =

American basketball player (1914–1983)

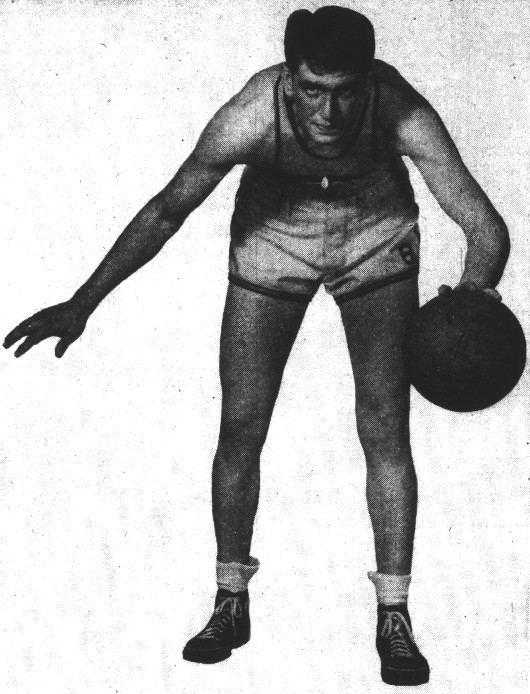
- Nowak, circa 1939

Personal information
- Born: March 14, 1914 South Bend, Indiana, U.S.
- Died: January 10, 1983 (aged 68) Treasure Island, Florida, U.S.
- Listed height: 6 ft 5 in (1.96 m)
- Listed weight: 210 lb (95 kg)

Career information
- High school: Central (South Bend, Indiana)
- College: Notre Dame (1935–1938)
- Playing career: 1938–194?
- Position: Center

Career history
- 1938–1941: Akron Firestone Non-Skids
- 1941–1942: Toledo Jim White Chevrolets
- ?: Rochester Royals
- ?: Philadelphia Sphas

Career highlights
- NBL champion (1940); 3× Consensus All-American (1936–1938); Helms national champion (1936)

Paul Nowak (March 14, 1914 – January 10, 1983) was an American basketball player. He was a three-time All-American at Notre Dame and was an early professional in the National Basketball League.

Nowak, a center, played at South Bend Central High School and Notre Dame. He played for Hall of Fame coach George Keogan and with fellow All-American teammate John Moir and future coaches Ray Meyer and George Ireland. The squad went 22-2-1 in 1936 and was later named national champions by the Helms Athletic Foundation.

After his collegiate career, Nowak played professionally for the Akron Firestone Non-Skids with former Notre Dame teammate John Moir, leading the team to a National Basketball League title in 1940. Nowak later played for the Toledo Jim Whites Chevrolets, Rochester Royals, and Philadelphia Sphas.
