= Irving Terjesen =

American basketball player

Personal information
- Born: March 4, 1915 Brooklyn, New York, U.S.
- Died: April 12, 1990 (aged 75) Akron, Ohio, U.S.
- Listed height: 6 ft 3 in (1.91 m)
- Listed weight: 195 lb (88 kg)

Career information
- High school: James Madison (Brooklyn, New York)
- College: NYU (1934–1938)
- Position: Forward / center

Career history
- 1938–1941: Akron Firestone Non-Skids

Career highlights
- 2× NBL champion (1939, 1940); First-team All-American – Omaha World (1937)

Irving Bernhard Terjesen (March 4, 1915 – April 12, 1990) was an American basketball player. An All-American college player at New York University, Terjesen played three seasons in the United States' National Basketball League (NBL).

Terjesen played in his native Brooklyn for James Madison High School, then played four seasons for Howard Cann's NYU Violets, where he was the leading scorer for two seasons. After the close of his college career, Terjesen played for the NBL's Akron Firestone Non-Skids from 1938 to 1941. The Firestone Non-Skids won the National Basketball League championships in both 1938–39 and 1939–40. In 63 career NBL appearances, Terjesen averaged 3.1 points per game. He was also known by the nicknames "Rip" and "Swede." He was inducted into the Summit County Athletic Hall of Fame in 1981.
