= Jerry Bush =

American college basketball coach (1914–1976)

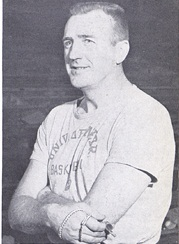

Biographical details
- Born: September 6, 1914; Brooklyn, New York, U.S.
- Died: October 27, 1976 (aged 62); Lincoln, Nebraska, U.S.

Playing career
- 1935–1938: St. John's
- 1937–1938: New York Celtics
- 1938–1941: Akron Firestone Non-Skids
- 1941–1942: Detroit Eagles
- 1941–1942: Wilmington Blue Bombers
- 1942–1947: Fort Wayne Zollner Pistons
- 1946–1947: Anderson Duffey Packers
- 1947–1948: Toledo Jeeps
- Position: Forward

Coaching career (HC unless noted)
- 1947–1954: Toledo
- 1954–1963: Nebraska

Head coaching record
- Overall: 208–190 (.523)
- Tournaments: NCAA: 0–1 (.000)

Accomplishments and honors

Championships
- 4× NBL champion (as player) (1939, 1940, 1944, 1945); ABL champion (as player) (1942); 4x WPBT champion (1941, 1944–1946); MAC championship (1954)

Awards
- All-NBL First Team (1939); 3× All-NBL Second Team (1943–1945); All-Time Pro Stars Second Team (1945); NBL All-Time Team; 2x WPBT First Team (1942, 1946); 2x WPBT Second Team (1944, 1945)

Gerard Leon Bush (September 6, 1914 – October 27, 1976) was a college men's basketball coach and player and professional basketball player. He was the head coach of Toledo from 1947 to 1954 and Nebraska from 1954 to 1963. He coached his teams to a 208–190 record, winning a Mid-American Conference championship and one NCAA tournament appearance. He played his college basketball at St. John's. He was inducted into the Toledo athletics Hall of Fame in 1986.

He was the grandfather of current Nebraska Cornhuskers men's basketball head coach Fred Hoiberg, and also the cousin of National Basketball League player Jake Ahearn.

== Head coaching record ==
Record table
Season	Team	Overall	Conference	Standing	Postseason
Toledo Rockets (Independent) (1947–1951)
1947–48	Toledo	21–5			
1948–49	Toledo	13–12			
1949–50	Toledo	22–6			
1950–51	Toledo	22–7			
Toledo Rockets (Mid-American Conference) (1951–1954)
1951–52	Toledo	20–11	8–4	3rd	
1952–53	Toledo	16–7	9–3	T–2nd	
1953–54	Toledo	13–10	10–2	1st	NCAA First Round
Toledo:		127–58 (.686)	27–9 (.750)		
Nebraska Cornhuskers (Big Seven Conference) (1954–1957)
1954–55	Nebraska	9–12	6–6	4th	
1955–56	Nebraska	7–16	3–9	6th	
1956–57	Nebraska	11–12	5–7	T–4th	
Nebraska Cornhuskers (Big Eight Conference) (1957–1963)
1957–58	Nebraska	10–13	5–7	T–4th	
1958–59	Nebraska	12–13	5–9	T–5th	
1959–60	Nebraska	7–17	4–10	T–7th	
1960–61	Nebraska	10–14	5–9	6th	
1961–62	Nebraska	9–16	5–9	T–5th	
1962–63	Nebraska	6–19	1–13	8th	
Nebraska:		81–132 (.380)	44–88 (.333)		
Total:		208–190 (.523)			
National champion Postseason invitational champion Conference regular season champion Conference regular season and conference tournament champion Division regular season champion Division regular season and conference tournament champion Conference tournament champion
