= Soup Cable =

American basketball player

Personal information
- Born: April 4, 1913 Akron, Ohio, U.S.
- Died: February 19, 1995 (aged 81) Prospect, Kentucky, U.S.
- Listed height: 6 ft 3 in (1.91 m)

Career information
- High school: West (Akron, Ohio)
- Position: Guard

Career history
- 1937–1941: Akron Firestone Non-Skids
- 1941–1942: Toledo Jim White Chevrolets

Career highlights
- 2× NBL champion (1939, 1940); 2× All-NBL First Team (1939, 1940); All-NBL Second Team (1938)

Howard Wilson "Soup" Cable (April 4, 1913 – February 19, 1995) was an American professional basketball player. He bypassed college basketball after graduating from high school and jumped right to the professional ranks, first with the Akron Firestone Non-Skids (1937–1941) and then to the Toledo Jim White Chevrolets (1941–42). Cable led the Non-Skids to consecutive National Basketball League championships in 1938–39 and 1939–40. In both of those seasons he was named to the All-NBL First Team. He was married to Catherine Tobin and had three children. Catherine's brother was Paul Tobin, a teammate of Cable's with Akron.

== Career statistics ==
Legend
GP	Games played	FGM	Field goals made
FTM	Free throws made	FTA	Free throws attempted
FT%	Free throw percentage	PTS	Total points
PPG	Points per game	**Bold**	Career high

†	Denotes seasons in which Cable's team won an NBL championship

=== NBL ===
==== Regular season ====
Year	Team	GP	FGM	FTM	FTA	FT%	PTS	PPG
1937–38	Akron Firestone Non-Skids	15	42	45			129	8.6
1938–39†	Akron Firestone Non-Skids	24	**99**	**64**			**262**	**10.9**
1939–40†	Akron Firestone Non-Skids	**26**	79	61			219	8.4
1940–41	Akron Firestone Non-Skids	15	30	34	**47**	.723	94	6.3
1941–42	Toledo	5	10	3	4	**.750**	29	5.8
Career		85	260	37	51	.725	733	8.6

==== Playoffs ====
Year	Team	GP	FGM	FTM	PTS	PPG
1937–38	Akron Firestone Non-Skids	2	6	10	22	**11.0**
1938–39†	Akron Firestone Non-Skids	5	**12**	17	41	8.2
1939–40†	Akron Firestone Non-Skids	**8**	11	**20**	**42**	5.3
1940–41	Akron Firestone Non-Skids	2	7	8	22	**11.0**
Career		17	36	55	127	7.5
