= Jack Ozburn =

American basketball player (1913–1969)

Personal information
- Born: January 4, 1913 Murphysboro, Illinois, U.S.
- Died: February 14, 1969 (aged 56) Akron, Ohio, U.S.
- Listed height: 6 ft 1 in (1.85 m)
- Listed weight: 175 lb (79 kg)

Career information
- High school: Murphysboro (Murphysboro, Illinois)
- College: Monmouth (Illinois) (1930–1934)
- Playing career: 1937–1942
- Position: Shooting guard / small forward

Career history
- 1937–1941: Akron Firestone Non-Skids
- 1941–1942: Toledo Jim White Chevrolets

Career highlights
- 2× NBL champion (1939, 1940); All-NBL First Team (1941); 3× All-NBL Second Team (1938–1940); AAU All-American (1937)

John Andrew Ozburn (January 4, 1913 – February 14, 1969) was an American basketball player who played five seasons in the American National Basketball League (NBL), a precursor to the modern NBA.

Ozburn starred in basketball and track at Monmouth College in Monmouth, Illinois. Following his college graduation in 1934, he played for the Kansas City Santa Fe Trails of the Amateur Athletic Union (AAU), where he was named an AAU All-American in 1936. He then moved to the NBL, where he played four seasons for the Akron Firestone Non-Skids from 1937 to 1941, winning league titles in 1939 and 1940. He played one final NBL season for the Toledo Jeeps.

He enlisted in the U.S. military in 1942–1945 during World War II.
