= John Moir (basketball) =

American basketball player (1915–1975)

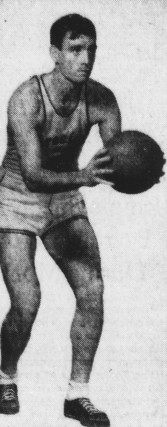
- Moir, circa 1939

Personal information
- Born: May 22, 1915 Rutherglen, Scotland
- Died: November 15, 1975 (aged 60) Carlisle, Pennsylvania, U.S.
- Listed height: 6 ft 2 in (1.88 m)
- Listed weight: 184 lb (83 kg)

Career information
- College: Notre Dame (1935–1938)
- Playing career: 1938–1946
- Position: Forward
- Number: 20

Career history
- 1938–1941: Akron Firestone Non-Skids
- 1945–1946: Cleveland Allmen Transfers

Career highlights
- 2× NBL champion (1939, 1940); All-NBL Second Team (1939); 3× Consensus All-American (1936–1938); Helms Player of the Year (1936); Helms Foundation national champion (1936)

John Moir (May 22, 1915 – November 15, 1975) was a professional basketball player between 1938 and 1946 in the United States' National Basketball League.

== Early life ==
Moir was born in Rutherglen, Scotland, to parents John and Elizabeth Moir. His father was a carpenter by trade, and Moir also had two siblings. In 1923, their family immigrated to the United States and chose to live in Niagara Falls, New York. As a freshman at Niagara Falls High School, Moir stood only 5 ft 2 in (1.57 m) tall. When he graduated from NFHS he enrolled at Trott Vocational School, at which point he had finished growing to 6 ft 2 in (1.88 m) and 184 lbs. It was at Trott where Moir first played basketball. When he finished his vocational education, Moir got a job at American Sales Book Company as their bookkeeper. He played on the company's industrial league basketball team, but it was actually his job performance that afforded him the opportunity to attend college.

== College ==
Moir decided to enroll at the University of Notre Dame in South Bend, Indiana. Back then, NCAA rules prohibited freshmen from playing varsity sports, so it was not until Moir's sophomore year of 1935–36 that he was able to play basketball for coach George Keogan.

Despite having not played basketball until the interim period between high school graduation and college, Moir led the Fighting Irish to a 22–2–1 record and the Helms Athletic Foundation NCAA National Championship in his first season of eligibility. He played the forward position and led the team in scoring at 11.3 points per game (ppg). Moir was also named the Helms Foundation College Basketball Player of the Year. Over the next two seasons, he led the team in scoring at 13.2 and 10.5 ppg, respectively, while also being named a consensus All-America selection in each of his three years playing for Notre Dame. Moir had broken every single school scoring record that Edward "Moose" Krause had set during his three-time All-American career earlier that decade.

== Professional ==
After graduating from Notre Dame, Moir played professionally in the National Basketball League. In his first two seasons in the league, he won two NBL championships as a member of the Akron Firestone Non-Skids in 1938–39 and 1939–40. Over the course of those two championship seasons Moir averaged 7 ppg, and in the 1940 playoffs he led all players with an 11 ppg average. He spent one more season playing for Akron before joining the Rochester Seagrams in 1942. However, World War II suspended Rochester's ability to play.

When Moir resumed play in 1945–46, he joined the Cleveland Allmen Transfers for whom he played his final season. When his NBL career ended, he had played for four years, won two league championships and scored 562 points in 89 total games.

== Later life ==
In his post-basketball life, Moir lived in Carlisle, Pennsylvania and worked for the Carlisle Tire and Rubber Company. He and his wife Marjorie raised two daughters and one son.
