= Paul Sheeks =

American athlete and coach (1889–1968)

Biographical details
- Born: October 18, 1889; Grand Rapids, North Dakota, U.S.
- Died: September 17, 1968 (aged 78); Akron, Ohio, U.S.
- Education: Dakota Wesleyan, South Dakota

Playing career

Football
- 1910–1914: South Dakota
- 1921–1922: Akron Pros

Basketball
- 1910–1914: South Dakota
- Positions: End, quarterback (football)

Coaching career (HC unless noted)

Football
- 1915–1916: Wabash

Basketball
- 1916–1917: Wabash
- 1937–1941: Akron Firestone Non-Skids

Head coaching record
- Overall: 14–2–1 (college football); 19–2 (college basketball)

Accomplishments and honors

Championships
- 2× NBL champion (1939, 1940)

Awards
- 2× NBL Coach of the Year (1939, 1940)

Paul Preston "Pepper" Sheeks (October 18, 1889 – September 17, 1968) was an American football and basketball player and coach. He played professional football with the Akron Pros of the National Football League (NFL) in 1922 and 1923. Before he joined the NFL, Sheeks played college football and college basketball at the University of South Dakota.

He then became the 20th head college football coach for the Wabash College Little Giants located in Crawfordsville, Indiana and he held that position for two seasons, from 1915 until 1916. In 1915 Sheeks guided the Little Giants to a 7–0–1 record. Wabash would not have another undefeated season until 1951. Sheek's football coaching record at Wabash was 14–2–1 ties, ranking him 11th at Wabash in total wins and second at the school in winning percentage (.853). Sheeks was also coached the Wabash College basketball team, from 1916 to 1917. In just one year of coaching, Sheeks led Wabash basketball team to a 19–2 record.

After World War I, Sheeks became the recreation director of the Firestone Tire and Rubber Company. Through this position, he coached the Akron Red Peppers bantamweight football team to national recognition in 1935.

In 1935 Sheeks helped found the National Basketball League, considered a predecessor of the National Basketball Association. He later became the coach of the Akron Firestone Non-Skids winning two league championships and was named NBL Coach of Year twice in 1939 and 1940.

== Head coaching record ==
=== College football ===
Year	Team	Overall	Conference	Standing	Bowl/playoffs
Wabash Little Giants (Independent) (1915)
1915	Wabash	7–0–1			
Wabash Little Giants (Indiana College Athletic League) (1916)
1916	Wabash	7–2		1st	
Wabash:		14–2–1			
Total:		14–2–1			
