= West High School (Akron, Ohio) =

High school in Akron, Ohio

Location
- 315 South Maple Street; Akron, Ohio 44302
- 41°05′05″N 81°32′00″W

Information
- Type: Public
- Opened: 1914; 112 years ago
- Closed: 1953; 73 years ago
- School district: Akron Public Schools
- Grades: 9–12
- Colors: Red and black
- Athletics conference: Akron City Series
- Nickname: Cowboys

West High School was a public high school in the Akron Public Schools that served the city of Akron, Ohio, from 1913 until 1953. Athletic teams were known as the Cowboys with school colors of red and black and competed in the Akron City Series.

== History ==
West High School was established in 1914 and was the third public high school in Akron, opening just three years after South High School. By the late 1940s, however, West's enrollment was typically lower than its neighboring high schools. In 1950, grades seven and eight were added to the building and it was known as West Junior–Senior High School.

The high school closed in 1953 and most West High School students went to either Buchtel, Central, or South high schools, though students who were going to be seniors could choose to attend any high school in the district. The West High School building continued to be used West Junior High School for grades seven through nine and remained in operation until 1980. In 1981, the building was purchased by the Akron Metropolitan Housing Authority and renovated into 68 apartments for senior citizens known as West High Apartments.

== Notable alumni ==
- Lola Albright, singer and actress
- Ed Finney, professional baseball player in the Negro leagues in 1947 and 1948
- Howard Harpster, college football player and coach, member of College Football Hall of Fame
- Helen Jepson, radio performer, opera singer in the Metropolitan Opera, and actress
- Louis Marshall Jones, musician known as "Grandpa Jones" and member of the Country Music Hall of Fame
- Sterling Tucker, Washington, D.C., politician and mayoral candidate
- Jesse White, actor in commercials, particularly as "Ol' Lonely" for the Maytag Corporation
