= List of National Basketball League (United States) champions =

The National Basketball League (NBL) Championship was the final series for the NBL and the conclusion of its postseason. The championship series were played in varying best-of-three or best-of-five formats. From 1937–38 to 1939–40, and again from 1944–45 to 1948–49, the championship series pitted the winners from the Eastern Division against the winners from the Western Division. However, due to fewer teams in the league caused by World War II, the NBL was not separated into divisions between 1940–41 and 1943–44, therefore the playoffs included the top four teams in the single-division league. Home court advantage was determined by better overall record heading into the championship series.

Three teams are tied with the most NBL championships at two each – the Akron Firestone Non-Skids (1939, 1940), Oshkosh All-Stars (1941, 1942), and Fort Wayne Zollner Pistons (1944, 1945). The Oshkosh All-Stars have the most championship appearances of any team with six, followed by the Sheboygan Red Skins' five appearances.

== Champions ==
- The brackets in the Western champion, Eastern champion, Higher seed, and Lower seed columns indicate the number of times that teams have appeared in an NBL Championship as well as each respective team's NBL Championship record to date.

**Bold**	Winning team of the NBL Championship
Italics	Team with home-court advantage

=== 1938 to 1940 ===
Year	Western champion	Coach	Result	Eastern champion	Coach	Reference
1938	Oshkosh All-Stars (1, 0–1)	George Hotchkiss	1–2	**Akron Goodyear Wingfoots** (1, 1–0)	Lefty Byers	
1939	Oshkosh All-Stars (2, 0–2)	George Hotchkiss	2–3	**Akron Firestone Non-Skids** (1, 1–0)	Paul Sheeks	
1940	Oshkosh All-Stars (3, 0–3)	George Hotchkiss	2–3	**Akron Firestone Non-Skids** (2, 2–0)	Paul Sheeks	

=== 1941 to 1944 ===
Year	Higher seed	Coach	Result	Lower seed	Coach	Reference
1941	**Oshkosh All-Stars** (4, 1–3)	George Hotchkiss	3–0	Sheboygan Red Skins (1, 0–1)	Frank Zummach	
1942	**Oshkosh All-Stars** (5, 2–3)	Lon Darling	2–1	Fort Wayne Zollner Pistons (1, 0–1)	Carl Bennett	
1943	Fort Wayne Zollner Pistons (2, 0–2)	Carl Bennett	1–2	**Sheboygan Red Skins** (2, 1–1)	Carl Roth	
1944	**Fort Wayne Zollner Pistons** (3, 1–2)	Bobby McDermott	3–0	Sheboygan Red Skins (3, 1–2)	Carl Roth	

=== 1945 to 1949 ===
Year	Western champion	Coach	Result	Eastern champion	Coach	Reference
1945	Sheboygan Red Skins (4, 1–3)	Dutch Dehnert	2–3	**Fort Wayne Zollner Pistons** (4, 2–2)	Bobby McDermott	
1946	Sheboygan Red Skins (5, 1–4)	Dutch Dehnert	0–3	**Rochester Royals** (1, 1–0)	Eddie Malanowicz	
1947	**Chicago American Gears** (1, 1–0)	Bobby McDermott	3–1	Rochester Royals (2, 1–1)	Eddie Malanowicz	
1948	**Minneapolis Lakers** (1, 1–0)	John Kundla	3–1	Rochester Royals (3, 1–2)	Eddie Malanowicz	
1949	Oshkosh All-Stars (6, 2–4)	Gene Englund & Eddie Riska	0–3	**Anderson Duffey Packers** (1, 1–0)	Murray Mendenhall	

== See also ==
- List of NBA champions
