= Akron Firestone Non-Skids =

- Founded: 1932
- Dissolved: 1941
- Location: Akron, Ohio
- Ownership: Firestone Tire and Rubber Company
- Championships: 1 NPBL Championship (1933); 2 NBL Championship (1939, 1940)
Home	Away	Third

The Akron Firestone Non–Skids were an American professional basketball team based in Akron, Ohio. The team was one of the thirteen founding members of the National Basketball League (NBL), which formed in 1937. The team was named for the Firestone Tire and Rubber Company, which was headquartered in Akron, Ohio.

== Franchise history ==
The team was founded by Firestone as an amateur works team. Like other industrial teams of the era, the players were company employees with year–round jobs who were not paid for basketball but owed their jobs to their basketball skills. The Non–Skids first competed professionally in the 1932–33 National Professional Basketball League and defeated the Toledo Crimson Coaches Tobaccos in the championship game. In 1935, the Non–Skids joined the Midwest Basketball Conference. In 1937, Firestone, General Electric, and Goodyear created the National Basketball League from company–sponsored teams and independent teams. The Non–Skids were NBL champions in 1939 and 1940, defeating the Oshkosh All-Stars both years in the Finals. Following the 1940–1941 season, the Akron Firestone Non–Skids disbanded, leaving the Akron Goodyear Wingfoots as the only NBL team representing Akron. During their time existing as a franchise, the Firestone Non-Skids would never end a season of theirs with a losing record, with them always competing in some playoff format during a season of play as well.

== Professional team seasons ==
Season	League	Name	W	L	%	Standings	Playoffs
1932–33	NPBL	Akron Firestone Non-Skids	10	1	90.9	1st	NPBL Champions
1935–36	MBC	Akron Firestone Non-Skids	11	7	61.1	1st	MBC Round Robin Tournament Semifinals (Third Place)
1936–37	MBC	Akron Firestone Non-Skids	13	5	72.2	2nd	MBC Semifinals
1937–38	NBL	Akron Firestone Non-Skids	14	4	77.8	1st	NBL Semifinals
1938–39	NBL	Akron Firestone Non-Skids	24	3	88.9	1st	NBL Champions
1939–40	NBL	Akron Firestone Non-Skids	19	9	67.9	1st	NBL Champions
1940–41	NBL	Akron Firestone Non-Skids	13	11	54.2	2nd	NBL Semifinals

== Players of note ==
- Chuck Taylor
- Soup Cable
- John Moir
- Glenn Roberts
- Wesley Bennett
- Irving Terjesen
- Roy "Goose" Burris

== Coaches ==
- Paul Sheeks
