= 1943–44 Oshkosh All-Stars season =

NBL professional basketball team season

- Head coach: Lon Darling
- General manager: Lon Darling
- Owner: Lon Darling
- Arena: South Park School Gymnasium

Results
- Record: 7–15 (.318)
- Place: Division: 3rd
- Playoff finish: Lost NBL Semifinals to Sheboygan Red Skins, 2–1; Either lost 1944 WPBT quarterfinals match to Harlem Globetrotters 41–31 or forfeited 1944 WPBT quarterfinals match to Harlem Globetrotters 2–0

The 1943–44 Oshkosh All-Stars season was the All-Stars' seventh year in the United States' National Basketball League (NBL), which was also the seventh year the league existed. However, if one were to include the independent seasons they played starting all the way back in 1929 before beginning their NBL tenure in 1937, this would officially be their fourteenth season of play. Four teams played out the entire 1943–44 season due to the Chicago Studebaker Flyers dropping out of the league entirely (with the suggested reason being due to perceived racism between teammates during practice) and the Cleveland Chase Brassmen being promoted from the Amateur Athletic Union into the NBL, meaning they did not use divisions for their fourth (and final) straight season in a row due to the heights of World War II. The All-Stars played their home games at the South Park School Gymnasium in the South Park Middle School within the Oshkosh Area School District.

Similar to the 1939–40 season, Oshkosh would start out this season with a franchise-worse 0–5 start to the season, with that tied worst start making it become a winless period to end the 1943 portion of their season altogether (which included one of three losses to the new Cleveland Chase Brassmen team that replaced the Chicago Studebaker Flyers this season, with all of Cleveland's wins this season coming against Oshkosh in general). However, once 1943 turned into 1944 for the All-Stars, they would attempt to turn their season around by going 6–3 in the month of January (starting with a three-game winning streak on January 1, 1944) to have a somewhat respectable (albeit a still below-average) 6–8 record before one final win on February 19 against the Fort Wayne Zollner Pistons led to them having their worst season in terms of records produced with a very poor 7–15 that would normally eliminate them from playoff contention in most regular seasons of competition. However, much like the previous NBL season where only four teams would compete throughout the entire season this time around, the Oshkosh All-Stars alongside the fourth place Cleveland Chase Brassmen would automatically qualify for playoff contention this season, with Oshkosh once again being the third seed and going up against the Sheboygan Red Skins, who would hold home court advantage yet again due to them being the second seed behind the first place Fort Wayne Zollner Pistons. Unlike the previous playoff series, this match-up would be one where the home court advantage would prove to make a difference in the end, as Sheboygan and Oshkosh would split the first two games played against each other in very close match-ups played before the Red Skins ended up blowing out the All-Stars in the third and final playoff game played in the semifinal round this season, though unlike the previous season, Sheboygan would not be named the NBL champions this time around due to them being swept by the #1 seeded Fort Wayne Zollner Pistons. This would end up becoming the first season where Leroy Edwards would not be named a member of any All-NBL teams due to him dealing with injury problems this season, though this season would see Clint Wager be named a member of the All-NBL First Team, while Charley Shipp was named a member of the All-NBL Second Team instead.

== Roster ==
1943–44 Oshkosh All-Stars roster
Players

| Pos. | No. | Player | Height | Weight | DOB | From |
|---|---|---|---|---|---|---|
| F/C | | Connie Mack Berry | 6 ft 3 in (1.91 m) | 215 lb (98 kg) | 1915–04–19 | NC State |
| G/F | | Harold Dahl | 5 ft 9 in (1.75 m) | 190 lb (86 kg) | 1923–10–19 | Florida State |
| C | | Leroy Edwards | 6 ft 5 in (1.96 m) | 210 lb (95 kg) | 1914–04–11 | Kentucky |
| F/C | | Gene Englund | 6 ft 5 in (1.96 m) | 205 lb (93 kg) | 1917–10–21 | Wisconsin |
| F/C | | Ed Erban | 6 ft 4 in (1.93 m) | 220 lb (100 kg) | 1921–07–06 | Marquette |
| F/C | | Gordon Flick | 6 ft 3 in (1.91 m) | 200 lb (91 kg) | 1921–08–13 | Drake |
| G/F | | Ed Glancy | 6 ft 3 in (1.91 m) | 180 lb (82 kg) | 1917–01–13 | Manhattan |
| F | | Leo Osiewalski | 6 ft 4 in (1.93 m) | 190 lb (86 kg) | 1921–09–25 | Menasha HS (WI) |
| G/F | | Eric Plahn | 6 ft 2 in (1.88 m) | 180 lb (82 kg) | 1919–07–25 | Harper HS (IL) |
| G | | Frank Sachse | 6 ft 0 in (1.83 m) | 195 lb (88 kg) | 1917–07–24 | Texas Tech |
| G/F | | Ed Scheiwe | 5 ft 11 in (1.80 m) | 175 lb (79 kg) | 1918–02–25 | Wisconsin |
| G/F | | Charley Shipp | 6 ft 1 in (1.85 m) | 200 lb (91 kg) | 1913–12–03 | Catholic |
| G/F | | Bob Sullivan | 6 ft 0 in (1.83 m) | 180 lb (82 kg) | 1921–07–01 | Wisconsin |
| F | | Ray Terzynski | 6 ft 1 in (1.85 m) | 180 lb (82 kg) | 1919–11–27 | UW–Stevens Point |
| C | | Clint Wager | 6 ft 6 in (1.98 m) | 210 lb (95 kg) | 1920–01–20 | Saint Mary's (MN) |

Coaches
Head coach
- Lon Darling

Legend
- (DP) Unsigned draft pick
- (FA) Free agent
- (S) Suspended
- Injured

Roster

Note: Harold Dahl, Gene Englund, Gordon Flick, Ed Glancy, Leo Osiewalski, and Bob Sullivan were not a part of this season's playoff roster for one reason or another.

== Regular season ==
=== Season standings ===
| Pos. | League Standings | Wins | Losses | Win % |
|---|---|---|---|---|
| 1 | Fort Wayne Zollner Pistons | 18 | 4 | .818 |
| 2 | Sheboygan Red Skins | 14 | 8 | .636 |
| 3 | Oshkosh All-Stars | 7 | 15 | .318 |
| 4 | Cleveland Chase Brassmen | 3 | 15 | .167 |

=== NBL Schedule ===
Not to be confused with exhibition or other non-NBL scheduled games that did not count towards Oshkosh's official NBL record for this season. An official database created by John Grasso detailing every NBL match possible (outside of two matches that the Kankakee Gallagher Trojans won over the Dayton Metropolitans in 1938) would be released in 2026 showcasing every team's official schedules throughout their time spent in the NBL. As such, these are the official results recorded for the Oshkosh All-Stars during their seventh season in the NBL.

| # | Date | Opponent | Score | Record |
| 1 | December 18 | Fort Wayne | 37–41 | 0–1 |
| 2 | December 21 | @ Fort Wayne | 39–56 | 0–2 |
| 3 | December 22 | @ Cleveland | 51–56 | 0–3 |
| 4 | December 26 | Sheboygan | 34–38 | 0–4 |
| 5 | December 30 | @ Sheboygan | 36–54 | 0–5 |
| 6 | January 1 | Cleveland | 42–27 | 1–5 |
| 7 | January 3 | @ Fort Wayne | 53–44 | 2–5 |
| 8 | January 4 | @ Cleveland | 52–45 | 3–5 |
| 9 | January 6 | @ Sheboygan | 28–42 | 3–6 |
| 10 | January 8 | Sheboygan | 42–34 | 4–6 |
| 11 | January 15 | Fort Wayne | 42–47 | 4–7 |
| 12 | January 23 | Cleveland | 69–40 | 5–7 |
| 13 | January 27 | Sheboygan | 29–38 | 5–8 |
| 14 | January 29 | Sheboygan | 37–27 | 6–8 |
| 15 | February 5 | Fort Wayne | 41–42 | 6–9 |
| 16 | February 8 | @ Fort Wayne | 48–57 | 6–10 |
| 17 | February 9 | @ Cleveland | 33–47 | 6–11 |
| 18 | February 12 | Sheboygan | 49–50 | 6–12 |
| 19 | February 17 | @ Sheboygan | 33–39 | 6–13 |
| 20 | February 19 | Fort Wayne | 40–35 | 7–13 |
| 21 | February 27 | Cleveland | 49–54 | 7–14 |
| 22 | February 29 | @ Fort Wayne | 43–44 | 7–15 |

It's suggested that during this season, both a home and road game that Oshkosh had scheduled against the Cleveland Chase Brassmen would end up being cancelled by the two teams, which would help the Oshkosh All-Stars get 22 scheduled games played for this season, while the Cleveland Chase Brassmen played only 18 regular season games this season.

== NBL Playoffs ==
=== NBL Semifinals ===
(3) Oshkosh All-Stars vs. (2) Sheboygan Red Skins: Sheboygan wins series 2–1

- Game 1: March 3, 1944 @ Sheboygan: Sheboygan 32, Oshkosh 31
- Game 2: March 4, 1944 @ Oshkosh: Oshkosh 34, Sheboygan 32
- Game 3: March 7, 1944 @ Sheboygan: Sheboygan 40, Oshkosh 27

=== Awards and honors ===
- First Team All-NBL – Clint Wager
- Second Team All-NBL – Charley Shipp
- NBL All-Time Team – Leroy Edwards, Gene Englund, and Charley Shipp

== World Professional Basketball Tournament ==
For the sixth straight year in a row, the Oshkosh All-Stars would participate in the annual World Professional Basketball Tournament in Chicago, which the 1944 event was held on March 20–24, 1944 and was mostly held by independently ran teams alongside all four of the NBL teams and the former American Basketball League team known as the Brooklyn Eagles this season due in part to World War II. In the first round, Oshkosh would see themselves go up against the Rochester Wings, who they would defeat with a 51–40 final score. In the quarterfinal round, the All-Stars would go up against the world famous Harlem Globetrotters, who would face off against Oshkosh after barely surviving in the first round against the Pittsburgh Corbetts (a team who might be considered a predecessor to the future Pittsburgh Raiders NBL team). Unlike the previous matches that the Oshkosh All-Stars had in the WPBT, this one would become seriously heated against the Harlem Globetrotters despite the usual comedic chicannery that they would try to pull, as multiple fights would occur within the fourth quarter of that match (with the police being involved to stop the first fight when six minutes were left to play in the fourth quarter) to the point where Oshkosh head coach Lon Darling was ultimately forced to pull his roster entirely despite having three minutes left to go in the game. While the Chicago Tribune and most other newspaper sources would record this match as the Harlem Globetrotters defeating the Oshkosh All-Stars as a regular 41–31 match like any other game occurred outside of the multiple fights at hand, at least one newspaper in the Fort Wayne News Sentinel reported the game as Oshkosh forfeiting the match to Harlem through a 2–0 defeat (which would be the only time in WPBT history such a result ever happened). Regardless of which source(s) and score is considered the correct one in mind, Oshkosh would ultimately be considered eliminated from the event following the bouts they had against the Globetrotters in the quarterfinal round, with the fights being considered a significant factor into having none of Oshkosh's players being named as players entering into any of the All-Tournament Teams this time around. As for the Harlem Globetrotters, they would end up losing to the former rivaling American Basketball League team known as the Brooklyn Eagles in an upsetting blowout manner (with Brooklyn later being blown out themselves by the Fort Wayne Zollner Pistons in the championship round), though they would end up defeating another all-black team in the New York Renaissance (a team that's considered to be the 100% serious version of the Harlem Globetrotters) with a 37–29 final score for a third place consolation prize finish in this event.

=== Games ===
- Won first round (51–40) over the Rochester Wings.
- Lost quarterfinal round (41–31) to the Harlem Globetrotters.
  - Can also be considered a 2–0 disqualification semifinal round loss to the Globetrotters instead (as noted by the Fort Wayne News-Sentinel) due to the Oshkosh All-Stars engaging in multiple, serious fights with Harlem's team late in the fourth quarter that led to Oshkosh head coach Lon Darling withdrawing his team entirely soon afterward.
