= 1943–44 Sheboygan Red Skins season =

NBL professional basketball team season

- Head coach: Carl Roth
- Arena: Sheboygan Municipal Auditorium and Armory

Results
- Record: 14–8 (.636)
- Place: Division: 2nd
- Playoff finish: Lost NBL Championship to Fort Wayne Zollner Pistons, 3–0
- Radio: WHBL

The 1943–44 Sheboygan Red Skins season was the Red Skins' sixth year in the United States' National Basketball League (NBL), which would also be the seventh year the NBL itself existed. However, if one were to include their few seasons they played as an independent team under a few various team names involving local businesses like the The Ballhorns (being sponsored by a local florist and funeral parlor), the Art Imigs (being sponsored by a local dry cleaning shop owned and operated by a man named Art Imig with team jerseys saying Art Imig's), and the Enzo Jels (being sponsored by a local gelatin manufacturer known as Enzo-Pac) at various points before becoming the Sheboygan Red Skins due to their promotion up into the NBL, this would officially be their eleventh overall season of play as well. For the entire 1943–44 season, the NBL would have only four total teams playing there due to the dropout of the Chicago Studebaker Flyers and the addition of the Amateur Athletic Union promoted Cleveland Chase Brassmen, which would officially be the league's lowest number of teams for an entire season by that point in time (largely caused by World War II), which caused the league to not use divisions for the fourth (and final) season in a row.

The Red Skins played their home games at the Sheboygan Municipal Auditorium and Armory for a second straight season in a row. After having a slow start in the month of December, the Red Skins would showcase why they were one of the better teams in the NBL once 1944 arrived, with them picking up a 9–6 record by the end of January before ending the regular season with a 14–8 record that warranted another second-place finish. Because the NBL once again showcased all four (remaining) competing teams surviving this season, the NBL Playoffs for the second straight season would showcase all of the NBL teams competing for a shot at the championship this season. For the third time in franchise history (1941 & 1943) and second straight year in a row, the Red Skins advanced themselves to the NBL Championship, with Sheboygan beating the Oshkosh All-Stars 2–1 this time around in their semifinal round rematch. They then went on to the 1944 NBL Championship match-up, which was a rematch against the Fort Wayne Zollner Pistons, with Fort Wayne winning the rematch in a best-of-five series, this time sweeping them 3–0. Ed Dancker (First Team), Rube Lautenschlager (Second), and Ken Suesens (Second) also earned All-NBL honors by the end of this season. Also following the season's conclusion, Carl Roth would step down from the head coaching position for the team, with Dutch Dehnert replacing his position for the upcoming season.

== Roster ==
1943–44 Sheboygan Red Skins roster
Players

| Pos. | No. | Player | Height | Weight | DOB | From |
|---|---|---|---|---|---|---|
| C | | Ed Dancker | 6 ft 7 in (2.01 m) | 200 lb (91 kg) | 1914–03–14 | South Division HS (WI) |
| F/C | | Elmer Gainer | 6 ft 6 in (1.98 m) | 195 lb (88 kg) | 1918–11–22 | DePaul |
| F/C | | Kleggie Hermsen | 6 ft 9 in (2.06 m) | 225 lb (102 kg) | 1923–03–12 | Minnesota |
| C | | George Jablonski | 6 ft 7 in (2.01 m) | 215 lb (98 kg) | 1919–07–18 | Milwaukee |
| G | | Tony Kelly | 6 ft 1 in (1.85 m) | 165 lb (75 kg) | 1919–02–18 | DePaul |
| G/F | | Rube Lautenschlager | 6 ft 2 in (1.88 m) | 190 lb (86 kg) | 1915–09–07 | UW–Oshkosh |
| G/F | | Bill McDonald | 6 ft 3 in (1.91 m) | 190 lb (86 kg) | 1916–11–05 | Marquette |
| F/C | | Mike Novak | 6 ft 9 in (2.06 m) | 219 lb (99 kg) | 1915–04–23 | Loyola Chicago |
| G | | Johnny Orr | 6 ft 0 in (1.83 m) | 185 lb (84 kg) | 1918–06–04 | St. Benedict's |
| G/F | | Bob Regh | 6 ft 2 in (1.88 m) | 190 lb (86 kg) | 1912–10–11 | Hammond Tech HS (IN) |
| G/F | | Dick Schulz | 6 ft 2 in (1.88 m) | 192 lb (87 kg) | 1917–01–03 | Wisconsin |
| G | | Ken Suesens | 6 ft 1 in (1.85 m) | 175 lb (79 kg) | 1916–10–23 | Iowa |

Coaches
Head coach
- Carl Roth

Legend
- (DP) Unsigned draft pick
- (FA) Free agent
- (S) Suspended
- Injured

Roster

Note: Kleggie Hermsen would only join the team during the NBL Playoffs, while Bob Regh and Dick Schulz were not on the playoff roster. Not only that, but George Jablonski and Johnny Orr would join Regh, Schulz, and even Hermsen in not joining the rest of the team for the 1944 World Professional Basketball Tournament as well.

== Regular season ==
=== Season standings ===
| Pos. | League Standings | Wins | Losses | Win % |
|---|---|---|---|---|
| 1 | Fort Wayne Zollner Pistons | 18 | 4 | .818 |
| 2 | Sheboygan Red Skins | 14 | 8 | .636 |
| 3 | Oshkosh All-Stars | 7 | 15 | .318 |
| 4 | Cleveland Chase Brassmen | 3 | 15 | .167 |

=== NBL Schedule ===
Not to be confused with exhibition or other non-NBL scheduled games that did not count towards Sheboygan's official NBL record for this season. An official database created by John Grasso detailing every NBL match possible (outside of two matches that the Kankakee Gallagher Trojans won over the Dayton Metropolitans in 1938) would be released in 2026 showcasing every team's official schedules throughout their time spent in the NBL. As such, these are the official results recorded for the Sheboygan Red Skins during their sixth season in the NBL.

| # | Date | Opponent | Score | Record |
| 1 | December 2 | Fort Wayne | 44–55 | 0–1 |
| 2 | December 12 | @ Cleveland | 47–41 | 1–1 |
| 3 | December 13 | @ Fort Wayne | 46–54 | 1–2 |
| 4 | December 26 | @ Oshkosh | 38–34 | 2–2 |
| 5 | December 30 | Oshkosh | 54–36 | 3–2 |
| 6 | January 2 | Cleveland | 37–36 | 4–2 |
| 7 | January 6 | Oshkosh | 42–28 | 5–2 |
| 8 | January 8 | @ Oshkosh | 34–42 | 5–3 |
| 9 | January 10 | @ Fort Wayne | 44–52 | 5–4 |
| 10 | January 11 | @ Cleveland | 36–30 | 6–4 |
| 11 | January 13 | Fort Wayne | 36–51 | 6–5 |
| 12 | January 16 | Cleveland | 52–44 | 7–5 |
| 13 | January 25 | @ Fort Wayne | 41–29 | 8–5 |
| 14 | January 27 | @ Oshkosh | 38–29 | 9–5 |
| 15 | January 29 | @ Oshkosh | 27–37 | 9–6 |
| 16 | February 3 | Fort Wayne | 36–51 | 9–7 |
| 17 | February 6 | Cleveland | 46–45 | 10–7 |
| 18 | February 12 | @ Oshkosh | 50–49 | 11–7 |
| 19 | February 17 | Oshkosh | 39–33 | 12–7 |
| 20 | February 19 | @ Cleveland | 55–46 | 13–7 |
| 21 | February 20 | @ Fort Wayne | 34–44 | 13–8 |
| 22 | February 27 | Fort Wayne | 37–34 | 14–8 |

It's suggested that during this season, both a home and road game that Sheboygan had scheduled against the Cleveland Chase Brassmen would end up being cancelled by the two teams, which would help the Sheboygan Red Skins get 22 scheduled games played for this season, while the Cleveland Chase Brassmen played only 18 regular season games this season.

== NBL Playoffs ==
=== NBL Semifinals ===
(2) Sheboygan Red Skins vs. (3) Oshkosh All-Stars: Sheboygan wins series 2–1

- Game 1: March 3, 1944 @ Sheboygan: Sheboygan 32, Oshkosh 31
- Game 2: March 4, 1944 @ Oshkosh: Oshkosh 34, Sheboygan 32
- Game 3: March 7, 1944 @ Sheboygan: Sheboygan 40, Oshkosh 27

=== NBL Championship ===
(2) Sheboygan Red Skins vs. (1) Fort Wayne Zollner Pistons: Fort Wayne wins series 3–0

- Game 1: March 9, 1944 @ Sheboygan: Fort Wayne 55, Sheboygan 53
- Game 2: March 12, 1944 @ Sheboygan: Fort Wayne 36, Sheboygan 26
- Game 3: March 14, 1944 @ Fort Wayne: Fort Wayne 48, Sheboygan 38

=== Awards and honors ===
- First Team All-NBL – Ed Dancker
- Second Team All-NBL – Rube Lautenschlager and Ken Suesens
- All-Time NBL Team – Ed Dancker and Mike Novak

== World Professional Basketball Tournament ==
For the sixth year in a row, the Sheboygan Red Skins would participate in the annual World Professional Basketball Tournament in Chicago, which the 1944 event was held on March 20–24, 1944 and was mostly held by independently ran teams alongside the four NBL teams from this season due in part to World War II. The Red Skins were given a first round bye alongside this season's NBL champions in the Fort Wayne Zollner Pistons due to them being the two best teams of the NBL this season. In Sheboygan's first (and only) match for the WPBT this year, the Red Skins would go up against the former American Basketball League team in the Brooklyn Eagles, who previously were the Brooklyn Indians in that rivaling league during that season before leaving that league during this season and then rebranding themselves from the Indians to the Eagles for the rest of this season. Unfortunately for Sheboygan, they would lose their first and only match they played in the tournament despite looking like they would have a solid advantage at the time over the Brooklyn squad that previously defeated the Camp Campbell Tankmen team in the first round, losing 49–43 to be eliminated in the quarterfinal round once again. The Brooklyn Eagles would end up going as far as the WPBT championship round this time around, with them blowing out the world famous (all-black) Harlem Globetrotters in the semifinal round with their small-ball style of play (primarily with the (at the time) record-high 32 points scored by Bob Tough) before the Eagles were blown out by the new NBL champions in the won Fort Wayne Zollner Pistons to have the Fort Wayne squad become both the new NBL and WPBT champions this season.

=== Game Played ===
- Sheboygan had a bye in the first round.
- Lost quarterfinal round (43–49) to the Brooklyn Eagles.
