= Riebe =

Riebe is a surname. Notable people with the surname include:

- Anton Riebe (1904–1987), Australian artist
- Bill Riebe (1917–2000), American basketball player
- David Riebe (born 1988), Swedish composer
- Ernest Riebe, German-born American cartoonist
- Hank Riebe (1921–2001), American baseball player
- Kathleen Riebe, American politician
- Mel Riebe (1916–1977), American basketball player
- John Riebe (Born 1958) Renowned American carpenter, Black belt in kanreikai karate.
