= 1943–44 National Basketball League (United States) season =

1943–44 NBL season
- League: National Basketball League
- Sport: Basketball
- Duration: December 2, 1943 – February 29, 1944; March 3–7, 1944 (Playoffs); March 9–14, 1944 (Finals)
- Games: 18-22
- Teams: 4

Regular season
- Season champions: Fort Wayne Zollner Pistons
- Top seed: Fort Wayne Zollner Pistons
- Season MVP: Bobby McDermott (Fort Wayne) & Mel Riebe (Cleveland)
- Top scorer: Mel Riebe (Cleveland)

Playoffs
- First semifinal champions: Fort Wayne Zollner Pistons
- First semifinal runners-up: Cleveland Chase Brassmen
- Second semifinal champions: Sheboygan Red Skins
- Second semifinal runners-up: Oshkosh All-Stars

Finals
- Venue: North Side High School Gym, Fort Wayne, Indiana; Sheboygan Armory, Sheboygan, Wisconsin
- Champions: Fort Wayne Zollner Pistons
- Runners-up: Sheboygan Red Skins

NBL seasons
- ← 1942–43 1944–45 →

The 1943–44 NBL season was the ninth National Basketball League (NBL) season. This was the fourth and final NBL regular season to be played without divisions due to only four teams competing in the league this season (this time for the entirety of this season, with one team replacing another team for this season) following the continued struggles of World War II. The regular season began on December 2, 1943, and ran until February 29, 1944. The playoffs began on March 3, 1944, and concluded on March 14, 1944, with the Fort Wayne Zollner Pistons winning the NBL Championship by three games to none over the Sheboygan Red Skins in a rematch of the previous season's championship.

Only four teams competed in this season of the NBL, with the league being heavily impacted by World War II, more so than in any other season. Because of the limited amount of competition for this season, for the second straight season, the NBL would have all four teams competing in their league automatically qualify for the NBL Playoffs by the end of the regular season, in spite of the poor records from both the Oshkosh All-Stars and especially the new Cleveland Chase Brassmen this season. Not only that, but for the second straight season in a row, there were also times where the richest team in the NBL, the Fort Wayne Zollner Pistons, had to help fund for the remaining three teams that needed any financial help during this season in case they needed it since they were the most financially stable franchise during this period of time due to them operating as a works team that conveniently fit the military market at hand at that point in time.

== Teams ==
The Chicago Studebaker Flyers ceased operations at the end of the previous season, after playing as the South Bend Studebaker Champions in the 1943 World Professional Basketball Tournament, with their departure being accidentally perceived as racism coming about following a bad practice session between star players Mike Novak and Sonny Boswell. They were replaced by the Cleveland Chase Brassmen, who had previously competed under the Cleveland Chase Copper Brass name in the Amateur Athletic Union.

National Basketball League
Cleveland Chase Brassmen

Cleveland, Ohio

Fort Wayne Zollner Pistons

Fort Wayne, Indiana

Oshkosh All-Stars

Oshkosh, Wisconsin

Sheboygan Red Skins

Sheboygan, Wisconsin

Coaching changes
Offseason
Team	1942–43 coach	1943–44 coach
Fort Wayne Zollner Pistons	Carl Bennett	Bobby McDermott (player-coach)
In-season
Team	Outgoing coach	Incoming coach
Cleveland Chase Brassmen	Vito Kubilus (player-coach)	Bill Brownell (player-coach)

== Regular season ==
Teams were supposed to play a 24-game schedule, with each team playing every other team eight times. However, the Cleveland Chase Brassmen ended up playing only 18 regular season games, skipping two games against every other team, which resulted in the other teams only playing 22 games.

The racial integration of the NBL had taken a step back following the departure of the Toledo Jim White Chevrolets and the Chicago Studebaker Flyers, but the process was continued by Cleveland, who fielded African American player Wee Willie Smith after signing him from the New York Renaissance near the end of the season.

=== Final standings ===
Pos.	League Standings	Wins	Losses	Win %
1	Fort Wayne Zollner Pistons	18	4	.818
2	Sheboygan Red Skins	14	8	.636
3	Oshkosh All-Stars	7	15	.318
4	Cleveland Chase Brassmen	3	15	.167

== Postseason ==
=== Playoffs ===
All four teams participated in the playoffs to determine the champion. The semifinals were played in a best-of-three format, with the 1-seed Fort Wayne Zollner Pistons playing the 4-seed Cleveland Chase Brassmen and the 2-seed Sheboygan Red Skins playing the 3-seed Oshkosh All-Stars. The finals were played as a best-of-five series.

The Pistons advanced to the finals after sweeping the Brassmen 2–0. They were joined by the Red Skins, who defeated the All-Stars 2–1.

==== Finals ====
Fort Wayne won the first game of the series 55–53 in an extremely close-run affair. Bobby McDermott scored 18 points for the Pistons, and Dick Schulz scored 17 for the Red Skins.

WHBL

March 9, 1944
8:30 PM (CWT)

Fort Wayne Zollner Pistons 55, Sheboygan Red Skins 53
Scoring by quarter: 13–15, 16–15, 12–12, 14–11
Pts: Bobby McDermott, 18	Pts: Dick Schulz, 17
Game 1, Fort Wayne leads 1–0

Sheboygan Armory
Sheboygan, Wisconsin
Referees: Messenger, Begovich

The second game in Sheboygan was a low-scoring affair. The Red Skins fell behind early and were unable to recover, falling 36–26. Jake Pelkington led the Pistons with 12 points, and Ed Dancker led the Red Skins with 6.

March 11, 1944
8:30 PM (CWT)

Fort Wayne Zollner Pistons 36, Sheboygan Red Skins 26
Scoring by quarter: 8–6, 12–6, 9–10, 7–4
Pts: Jake Pelkington, 12	Pts: Ed Dancker, 6
Game 2, Fort Wayne leads 2–0

Sheboygan Armory
Sheboygan, Wisconsin
Referees: Messenger, Kriznecky

Game 3 saw the series shift to Fort Wayne, which would be the site of the remaining games of the series. Only one game was played there, however, as the Pistons swept the Red Skins and sealed their first NBL title with a 48–38 victory. The Pistons opened up to an early lead and weathered a second-half comeback attempt from the Red Skins. Schulz led the Red Skins with 11 points and McDermott led the Pistons with 12.

WHBL

March 14, 1944
8:45 PM (CWT)

Sheboygan Red Skins 38, Fort Wayne Zollner Pistons 48
Scoring by quarter: 5–17, 6–14, 14–5, 13–12
Pts: Dick Schulz, 11	Pts: Bobby McDermott, 12
Game 3, Fort Wayne wins 3–0

North Side High School Gym
Fort Wayne, Indiana
Referees: Kriznecky, Messenger

==== Bracket ====
Semifinals
1	Fort Wayne Zollner Pistons	2
4	Cleveland Chase Brassmen	0
2	Sheboygan Red Skins	2
3	Oshkosh All-Stars	1

NBL Championship
1	Fort Wayne Zollner Pistons	3
2	Sheboygan Red Skins	0

- Bold Series winner

=== World Professional Basketball Tournament ===
Following the completion of the playoffs, all four NBL teams participated in the 1944 edition of the World Professional Basketball Tournament. The Cleveland Chase Brassmen, Oshkosh All-Stars, and Sheboygan Red Skins were all eliminated in the quarterfinals. The Fort Wayne Zollner Pistons added on to their NBL title with a victory in the final tournament match over the Brooklyn Eagles, who had beaten the Red Skins and Harlem Globetrotters on their way to the final, by a score of 50–33. The Pistons were also victorious over the New York Rens in the semifinals.

March 25, 1944
9:15 PM (CWT)

Fort Wayne Zollner Pistons 50, Brooklyn Eagles 33
Scoring by quarter: 12–9, 16–2, 14–10, 8–11
Pts: Jake Pelkington, 18	Pts: Bob Tough, 11; Bernard Opper, 11

Chicago Stadium
Chicago, Illinois
Attendance: 14,226
Referees: Nate Messenger, Dutch Kriznecky

== Statistics ==
Category	Player	Team	Stat
Points	Mel Riebe	Cleveland Chase Brassmen	323
Free-Throws	Mel Riebe	Cleveland Chase Brassmen	45
Field goals	Bobby McDermott	Fort Wayne Zollner Pistons	123

Note: Prior to the 1969–70 NBA season, league leaders in points were determined by totals rather than averages. Rebounding and assist numbers were not recorded properly in the NBL like they would be in the BAA/NBA, as would field goal and free-throw shooting percentages.

== Awards ==
- NBL Most Valuable Players: Bobby McDermott, Fort Wayne Zollner Pistons & Mel Riebe, Cleveland Chase Brassmen
- NBL Coach of the Year: Bobby McDermott, Fort Wayne Zollner Pistons
- NBL Rookie of the Year: Mel Riebe, Cleveland Chase Brassmen
- All-NBL First Team:
  - G/F – Mel Riebe, Cleveland Chase Brassmen
  - C/F – Clint Wager, Oshkosh All-Stars
  - C – Ed Dancker, Sheboygan Red Skins
  - G – Buddy Jeannette, Fort Wayne Zollner PIstons
  - G – Bobby McDermott, Fort Wayne Zollner Pistons
- All-NBL Second Team:
  - F/G – Rube Lautenschlager, Sheboygan Red Skins
  - F/C – Jerry Bush, Fort Wayne Zollner Pistons
  - C/F – Jake Pelkington, Fort Wayne Zollner Pistons
  - G/F – Charley Shipp, Oshkosh All-Stars
  - G – Ken Suesens, Sheboygan Red Skins

== See also ==
- National Basketball League (United States)
