= 1943–44 Fort Wayne Zollner Pistons season =

Third season of the Pistons in the NBL (won NBL championship)

- NBL champions
- Division champions
- Head coach: Bobby McDermott
- Owner: Fred and Janet Zollner
- Arena: North Side High School Gym, Fort Wayne, Indiana

Results
- Record: 18–4 (.818)
- Place: Division: 1st
- Playoff finish: NBL champions (Won 3–0 over Sheboygan Red Skins)
- Stats at Basketball Reference

The 1943–44 Fort Wayne Zollner Pistons season was the third season of the franchise in the National Basketball League. The Pistons entered the season with the big three of league MVP Bobby McDermott, Buddy Jeannette, and Jake Pelkington, as well as coming off of two straight losses in the NBL's championship series. The team finished the season 18–4 (with their four losses being against both the Oshkosh All-Stars and defending NBL champion Sheboygan Red Skins each during the months of January and February 1944) and defeated the Cleveland Chase Brassmen in the first round in a two-game sweep to earn their third straight finals birth and a rematch of last year against the Sheboygan Red Skins. From there the Pistons swept the Red Skins in 3 games to win their first NBL Championship.

In addition to the NBL Playoffs, the Fort Wayne Zollner Pistons also participated in the World Professional Basketball Tournament as well. The Zollner Pistons would not compete against any other NBL teams in the 1944 event; they instead competed against the independently ran Dayton Aviators and New York Renaissance before competing in the championship match against the rivaling American Basketball League's Brooklyn Eagles. Their toughest match would come against the Renaissance in the semifinal round; the other two matches Fort Wayne had would result in them blowing out their opponents in order to get their first WPBT championship alongside their first NBL championship.

== Roster ==
1943–44 Fort Wayne Zollner Pistons roster
Players

Pos.	No.	Player	Height	Weight	DOB	From
G	28	Don Beery	6 ft 0 in (1.83 m)	180 lb (82 kg)	1920-02-23	South Side HS (IN)
G	25	Paul Birch	6 ft 1 in (1.85 m)	190 lb (86 kg)	1910-01-04	Duquesne
F/C		Jerry Bush	6 ft 3 in (1.91 m)	200 lb (91 kg)	1914-09-06	St. John's
G/F	23	Dale Hamilton	6 ft 0 in (1.83 m)	180 lb (82 kg)	1919-08-16	Franklin (IN)
G		Buddy Jeannette	5 ft 11 in (1.80 m)	175 lb (79 kg)	1917-09-15	Washington & Jefferson
G	24	Bobby McDermott	5 ft 11 in (1.80 m)	180 lb (82 kg)	1914-01-07	Flushing HS (NY)
G/F	29	Red Oberbruner	5 ft 11 in (1.80 m)	175 lb (79 kg)	1918-10-05	Notre Dame
F/C		Jake Pelkington	6 ft 6 in (1.98 m)	220 lb (100 kg)	1916-01-03	Manhattan
G/F		Chick Reiser	5 ft 11 in (1.80 m)	165 lb (75 kg)	1914-12-17	NYU
F/C	21	Carlisle Towery	6 ft 4 in (1.93 m)	210 lb (95 kg)	1920-06-20	Western Kentucky

Coaches
Head coach

Bobby McDermott

Legend
- (DP) Unsigned draft pick
- (FA) Free agent
- (S) Suspended
- Injured

Roster

== Regular season ==
=== Season standings ===
Pos.	League Standings	Wins	Losses	Win %
1	Fort Wayne Zollner Pistons	18	4	.818
2	Sheboygan Red Skins	14	8	.636
3	Oshkosh All-Stars	7	15	.318
4	Cleveland Chase Brassmen	3	15	.167

=== NBL Schedule ===
Not to be confused with exhibition or other non-NBL scheduled games that did not count towards Fort Wayne's official NBL record for this season. An official database created by John Grasso detailing every NBL match possible (outside of two matches that the Kankakee Gallagher Trojans won over the Dayton Metropolitans in 1938) would be released in 2026 showcasing every team's official schedules throughout their time spent in the NBL. As such, these are the official results recorded for the Fort Wayne Zollner Pistons during their third season in the NBL.

#	Date	Opponent	Score	Record
1	December 2	@ Sheboygan	55–44	1–0
2	December 13	Sheboygan	54–46	2–0
3	December 18	@ Oshkosh	41–37	3–0
4	December 21	Oshkosh	56–39	4–0
5	December 25	Cleveland	43–42	5–0
6	December 26	@ Cleveland	62–44	6–0
7	January 3	Oshkosh	44–53	6–1
8	January 10	Sheboygan	52–44	7–1
9	January 13	@ Sheboygan	51–36	8–1
10	January 15	@ Oshkosh	47–42	9–1
11	January 18	Cleveland	44–42	10–1
12	January 25	Sheboygan	29–41	10–2
13	January 30	Cleveland	51–30	11–2
14	February 3	@ Sheboygan	51–36	12–2
15	February 5	@ Oshkosh	42–41	13–2
16	February 8	Oshkosh	57–48	14–2
17	February 13	@ Cleveland	54–50	15–2
18	February 19	@ Oshkosh	35–40	15–3
19	February 20	Sheboygan	44–34	16–3
20	February 23	@ Cleveland	49–37	17–3
21	February 27	@ Sheboygan	34–37	17–4
22	February 29	Oshkosh	44–43	18–4

It's suggested that during this season, both a home and road game that Fort Wayne had scheduled against the Cleveland Chase Brassmen would end up being cancelled by the two teams, which would help the Fort Wayne Zollner Pistons get 22 scheduled games played for this season, while the Cleveland Chase Brassmen played only 18 regular season games this season.

== NBL Playoffs ==
=== NBL Semifinals ===
(1) Fort Wayne Zollner Pistons vs. (4) Cleveland Chase Brassmen: Fort Wayne wins series 2–0

- Game 1: March 5, 1944 @ Fort Wayne: Fort Wayne 64, Cleveland 37
- Game 2: March 7, 1944 @ Cleveland: Fort Wayne 42, Cleveland 31

=== NBL Championship ===
(1) Fort Wayne Zollner Pistons vs. (2) Sheboygan Red Skins: Fort Wayne wins series 3–0

- Game 1: March 9, 1944 @ Sheboygan: Fort Wayne 55, Sheboygan 53
- Game 2: March 12, 1944 @ Sheboygan: Fort Wayne 36, Sheboygan 26
- Game 3: March 14, 1944 @ Fort Wayne: Fort Wayne 48, Sheboygan 38

=== Awards and honors ===
- Bobby McDermott would lead the NBL in total field goals made by making a total of 123 field goals this season.
- NBL Coach of the Year – Bobby McDermott
- NBL Most Valuable Player – Bobby McDermott
- First Team All-NBL – Bobby McDermott and Buddy Jeannette
- Second Team All-NBL – Jerry Bush and Jake Pelkington
- All-Time NBL Team – Bobby McDermott, Buddy Jeannette, and Jerry Bush

== World Professional Basketball Tournament ==
For the fourth year in a row (third in a row while representing the NBL), the Fort Wayne Zollner Pistons would participate in the annual World Professional Basketball Tournament in Chicago, which the 1944 event was held on March 20–24, 1944 and was mostly held by independently ran teams alongside the four NBL teams that remained by this time due in part to World War II. The Zollner Pistons were given a first round bye alongside the Sheboygan Red Skins due to them being the best teams in the NBL this season. The first match that Fort Wayne competed in was against the independently ran Dayton Aviators (who were run by players stationed at the Wright Field in Riverside, Ohio), who the Zollner Pistons crushed 59–34 for what was their own first round match-up.

In the semifinal round, Fort Wayne competed against the New York Renaissance, who returned to the event as the Renaissance after previously not entering the event under that name the previous year (though members of that team would compete in the tournament while under the Washington Bears name, who were the last independent team to win the event altogether). The Renaissance would prove to hold a formidable challenge to the Zollner Pistons in the semifinal round, though Fort Wayne would upset the independent New York team by a close 42–38 victory in their favor, ending the Renaissance's chances to technically repeat as WPBT champions if we count the previous year's event for the Washington Bears as the Rens competing under that name instead.

For the championship match, the Zollner Pistons saw themselves go up against the surprise team of the event, the Brooklyn Eagles, who were rebranded from their original Brooklyn Indians name and composed of star players from the rivaling American Basketball League, instead of a team like the Harlem Globetrotters or one of the remaining NBL teams. Regardless, Fort Wayne only saw the Eagles as legitimate competition for one quarter before nearly shutting them out in the second quarter and subsequently routing them 50–33 in the championship game, being the second NBL team to win championships in both the NBL and WPBT in the same season behind the 1941–42 Oshkosh All-Stars in 1942. Bobby McDermott was subsequently named the tournament's MVP, with him and two other Zollner Pistons also being named onto the All-Tournament Team listings.

=== Scores ===
- Fort Wayne had a bye in the first round.
- Won quarterfinal round (59–34) over Dayton Aviators
- Won semifinal round (42–38) over New York Renaissance
- Won championship round (50–33) over Brooklyn Eagles

=== Awards and honors ===
- Bobby McDermott, All-Tournament First Team, MVP
- Blackie Towery, All-Tournament First Team
- Jerry Bush, All-Tournament Second Team
