= Frank Garcia (basketball) =

American basketball and baseball player

Personal information
- Born: c. 1918 Akron, Ohio, U.S.
- Died: January 24, 1956 (aged 38) Akron, Ohio, U.S.
- Listed height: 6 ft 0 in (1.83 m)
- Listed weight: 170 lb (77 kg)
- Position: Guard / forward

Career history
- 1943–1944: Cleveland Chase Brassmen
- 1944–1946: Cleveland Allmen Transfers

Frank F. Garcia (c. 1918 – January 24, 1956) was an American professional basketball player and minor league baseball player. In basketball, Cihlar played in the National Basketball League for the Cleveland Chase Brassmen / Allmen Transfer between 1943 and 1946. In baseball, Garcia played the Butler Yankees (1939) and Leaksville-Draper-Spray Triplets (1946).
