= Vito Kubilus =

American basketball player

Personal information
- Born: June 29, 1914 New York City, New York, U.S.
- Died: November 16, 1986 (aged 72) Euclid, Ohio, U.S.
- Listed height: 6 ft 1 in (1.85 m)
- Listed weight: 180 lb (82 kg)

Career information
- College: Ohio College of Chiropody
- Position: Guard

Career history

Playing
- 1944: Cleveland Chase Brassmen
- 1946–1947: Cleveland Rosenblums

Coaching
- 1943–1944: Cleveland Chase Brassmen
- 1959–1960: John Carroll

Vito J. Kubilus (June 29, 1914 – November 16, 1986) was an American professional basketball player and coach.

== College career ==
Kubilus played college basketball for Ohio College of Chiropody where he was named the captain for the 1935–36 season.

== Professional career ==
He played in the National Basketball League for the Cleveland Chase Brassmen during the 1943–44 season and averaged 2.0 points per game. Hired as a player-coach, he had served as the team's head coach for the first two-thirds of the season before Bill Brownell took over the responsibility. Kubilus stayed on the team as a player.

During the 1946–47 season, he was a player-coach for the Cleveland Rosenblums.

== Coaching career ==
In 1959, Kubilus was appointed as the head coach at John Carroll University for one season. He led the school to its third straight title in the President's Athletic Conference. As he was hired on a part-time basis, due to his job as a wage and salary administrator for the Chase Brass and Copper Company, he was ineligible to continue for another season as PAC rules dictated that part-time coaches could only be hired for a single season.
