= Hal Cihlar =

American basketball player

Personal information
- Born: July 16, 1914 Cleveland, Ohio, U.S.
- Died: August 21, 1995 (aged 81) Richfield, Ohio, U.S.
- Listed height: 6 ft 5 in (1.96 m)
- Listed weight: 210 lb (95 kg)

Career information
- College: Case Western Reserve (1934–1936)
- Position: Power forward / center

Career history

Playing
- 1944: Cleveland Chase Brassmen

Coaching
- 1936–19??: West Tech HS

Harold John Cihlar (July 16, 1914 – August 21, 1995) was an American professional basketball player. Cihlar played in the National Basketball League for the Cleveland Chase Brassmen in 1943–44. He averaged 0.3 points per game in four career games played.
