= Willard Swihart =

American basketball player

Personal information
- Born: August 25, 1914 Massillon, Ohio, U.S.
- Died: August 9, 1999 (aged 84) Chardon, Ohio, U.S.
- Listed height: 6 ft 3 in (1.91 m)
- Listed weight: 190 lb (86 kg)

Career information
- High school: Washington (Massillon, Ohio)
- College: Toledo (1936–1939)
- Position: Power forward / center

Career history
- 1943–1944: Cleveland Chase Brassmen

Willard Earl Swihart (August 25, 1914 – August 9, 1999) was an American professional basketball player. He played in the National Basketball League for the Cleveland Chase Brassmen during the 1943–44 season. Swihart averaged 2.6 points per game.
