= Harold Dahl =

Harold Dahl may refer to:

- Harold Edward Dahl, Spanish Civil War fighter ace and World War II RCAF pilot trainer
- Harold J. Dahl, American politician and judge
- Harold Dahl (basketball), American basketball player
- Harold Dahl, seaman involved in the Maury Island incident
