= Regh =

Regh may refer to:

== People ==
- Anton Regh (1940–2018), German football player
- Bob Regh (1912–1999), American basketball player
- Engelbert Regh (1887-1955), German politician
