= NBL (United States) Rookie of the Year Award =

The National Basketball League Rookie of the Year Award was an annual National Basketball League (NBL) award given to the top rookie(s) of the regular season in each of the twelve years the league existed. The Rookie of the Year was selected by sports writers, broadcasters, coaches, and managers. Despite the dozens of teams that played in the NBL through its history, three of them collectively dominated over half of the award's recipients. The Sheboygan Red Skins had the most winners with three total winners in the mid-to-late eras of the NBL's existence, while both the Indianapolis Kautskys and the Akron Goodyear Wingfoots had two each early in their existences, for a combined seven of the twelve awards bestowed (58.3%). The only other teams to manage even one NBL Rookie of the Year Award winner were the Detroit Eagles, the Cleveland Chase Brassmen, the Chicago American Gears, the Rochester Royals, and the Syracuse Nationals.

Among the winners were two future Basketball Hall of Famers, Red Holzman (1986) and Dolph Schayes (1973).

== Winners ==
| * | Inducted into the Naismith Memorial Basketball Hall of Fame |
| Team (X) | Denotes the number of times a player from this team had won at that time |

| Season | Player | Position | Team |
|---|---|---|---|
| 1937–38 | Robert Kessler | Forward | Indianapolis Kautskys |
| 1938–39 | Jewell Young | Forward | Indianapolis Kautskys (2) |
| 1939–40 | Ben Stephens | Guard / forward | Akron Goodyear Wingfoots |
| 1940–41 | Ed Sadowski | Center | Detroit Eagles |
| 1941–42 | George Glamack | Forward / center | Akron Goodyear Wingfoots (2) |
| 1942–43 | Ken Buehler | Forward / center | Sheboygan Red Skins |
| 1943–44 | Mel Riebe | Guard / forward | Cleveland Chase Brassmen |
| 1944–45 | Stan Patrick | Forward | Chicago American Gears |
| 1945–46 | Red Holzman* | Guard | Rochester Royals |
| 1946–47 | Fred Lewis | Guard / forward | Sheboygan Red Skins (2) |
| 1947–48 | Mike Todorovich | Forward / center | Sheboygan Red Skins (3) |
| 1948–49 | Dolph Schayes* | Center | Syracuse Nationals |

== See also ==
- NBA Rookie of the Year Award
