= Eric Plahn =

American basketball player

Personal information
- Born: July 25, 1919 Chicago, Illinois, U.S.
- Died: June 4, 1998 (aged 78) Bakersfield, California, U.S.
- Listed height: 6 ft 2 in (1.88 m)
- Listed weight: 180 lb (82 kg)

Career information
- High school: Harper (Chicago, Illinois)
- Playing career: 1943–1947
- Position: Shooting guard / small forward

Career history
- 1943–1944: Oshkosh All-Stars
- 1946–1947: Chicago Shamrocks

Eric Axel "Bud" Plahn (July 25, 1919 – June 4, 1998) was an American professional basketball player. He played for the Oshkosh All-Stars in the National Basketball League in 1943–44 and averaged 1.6 points per game.
