= John Poncar =

American basketball player

Personal information
- Born: October 16, 1913 Ohio, U.S.
- Died: January 1, 2010 (aged 96) Linesville, Pennsylvania, U.S.
- Listed height: 6 ft 3 in (1.91 m)
- Listed weight: 190 lb (86 kg)
- Position: Power forward / center

Career history
- 1941–1943: Cleveland Chase Brass Coppers
- 1943–1944: Cleveland Chase Brassmen
- 1946–1947: Cleveland Rosenblums

John James Poncar (October 16, 1913 – January 1, 2010) was an American professional basketball player. He played in the National Basketball League for the Cleveland Chase Brassmen during the 1943–44 season and averaged 1.7 points per game.
