= Ed Glancy =

American basketball player

Personal information
- Born: January 13, 1917 Valley Falls, Rhode Island, U.S.
- Died: August 21, 1990 (aged 73) Fort Myers, Florida, U.S.
- Listed height: 6 ft 3 in (1.91 m)
- Listed weight: 180 lb (82 kg)

Career information
- College: Manhattan (1936–1939)
- Position: Guard / forward

Career history

Playing
- 1941–1942: Pittsfield
- 1943: Oshkosh All-Stars
- 1945–1946: Pawtucket All-Stars
- 1946–1947: Fall River

Coaching
- 1947–1971: Illinois Tech

Edward William Glancy (January 13, 1917 – August 21, 1990) was an American professional basketball player. He played for the Oshkosh All-Stars in the National Basketball League for five games during the 1943–44 season and averaged 1.8 points per game.

Glancy served in the Navy during World War II, and then served as the men's basketball and baseball coach (as well as the athletic director) for the Illinois Institute of Technology.
