= Cleveland Allmen Transfers =

American basketball team

Cleveland Chase Brassmen / Allmen Transfers
- Leagues: Amateur Athletic Union; National Basketball League
- Founded: c. 1935; 1943
- Folded: 1946
- History: Cleveland Chase Copper Brassmen c. 1935–1943; Cleveland Chase Brassmen; 1943–1944 (NBL); Cleveland Allmen Transfers; 1944–1946 (NBL)
- Arena: Cleveland Auditorium
- Capacity: 10,000
- Location: Cleveland, Ohio, U.S.
- Ownership: Chase Brass (?) c. 1935–1944; Allmen Transfer & Moving Company (?); 1944–1946
- Championships: none

The Cleveland Allmen Transfers were an American basketball team that played professionally in the National Basketball League (NBL) for one season as the Cleveland Chase Brassmen in the 1943–44 NBL season before playing as the Cleveland Allmen Transfers from 1944 until 1946. Previously, the franchise had played in the Amateur Athletic Union as the Cleveland Chase Copper Brassmen from as early as 1935 up until 1943 due in part to the NBL being desperate to add any new teams into their (at the time) struggling league after they saw two of their newest teams in the Toledo Jim White Chevrolets and the Chicago Studebaker Flyers fold operations either during or after the season's conclusion, and they knew it would be very awkward and unfeasible to have a competitive basketball league with only three professional basketball teams (two of which were in the state of Wisconsin alone) around in the Fort Wayne Zollner Pistons works team, the Oshkosh All-Stars, and the newest NBL champions that season in the Sheboygan Red Skins. The Cleveland squad would be one of the weakest teams ever added in the NBL's history, due in part to the team's original history as an AAU franchise, though they would still somehow make it to the NBL Playoffs in two out of their three seasons of play in spite of the failures at hand. Outside of that notion, their best note of achievements all relate to that of Mel Riebe, who would be far and away their best player of the team in each of their three seasons of existence in the NBL, to the point where he was the only Cleveland player to be named a member of the All-NBL First Team in their first two seasons of existence. Weirdly, some places have misconstrued their team history as not only being mixed in alongside both that of the Chicago Bruins and the Chicago Studebaker Flyers (who were both unrelated teams that joined the NBL at unrelated times), but also having their history being mixed in alongside that of the Syracuse Nationals, who would later become the Philadelphia 76ers.

== History ==
Originally, the franchise first existed within the Amateur Athletic Union by as early as 1935 with the sponsorship of the Chase Brass and Copper Company, though they would first play as the Cleveland Chase Copper Brassmen instead of the more well-known Cleveland Chase Brassmen that they would later go by. Not much would be known about that team during that period of time, though it can be inferred that they weren't considered one of the better known AAU teams in the area during that period of time. Despite that fact, when the NBL was struggling to survive by 1943, they would ask for the Cleveland Chase Copper Brassmen to join the NBL for the 1943–44 season; while they ultimately would accept, they ended up becoming the Cleveland Chase Brassmen instead, with only Mel Riebe and John Poncar from the original run of teams joining up on their professional roster. The Chase Brassmen's first season would turn out to be a horrible season for them when they entered the NBL, as they would only win three different games against the Oshkosh All-Stars (out of 18 total games played) despite having Wee Willie Smith as a last-minute addition to the team, with six of their games against the remaining three NBL teams being cancelled for whatever reason and their usual home venue being switched around late in the season for high school venues instead. Despite the poor results at hand, Cleveland would still qualify for the NBL Playoffs that season (albeit by default), with them being swept by the eventual champion Fort Wayne Zollner Pistons not long afterward (despite the best efforts from leading NBL rookie scorer Mel Riebe). Following the first season's considerable failures, Chase Brass would sell off the team to the local Allmen Transfer & Moving Company, rebranding the team into the Cleveland Allmen Transfers for the rest of their existence not long afterward.

During their second professional season and first season as the Allmen Transfers, there were signs of competitive progress during their first season with a new head coach Joseph J. Carlin. Carlin coached their top scorer Mel Riebe to become more than just a scorer in order to raise their performance level in the NBL. Following the formation of the NBL after adding the Chicago American Gears and Pittsburgh Raiders teams, resulting in divisional play, the team managed to qualify for the NBL playoffs even though they finished the regular season with a losing record. They played in the Eastern Division, being swept out in the playoffs by the Fort Wayne Zollner Pistons, eventual champions of the NBL. In the end, Riebe was named to the All-NBL First Team.

With the third and final season in the NBL, the Allmen Transfers would turn out to compete for most of the season without Mel Riebe competing with the team due to him entering U.S. military service for this season, despite the fact that the World War II would officially be over with by that point in time. Because of that fact, the team would only end up having one more win than their only season while playing as the Cleveland Chase Brassmen, but would ultimately have a worse overall season than that season with a 4–29 record, with one of their games against the Indianapolis Kautskys (who would return to the NBL alongside the joining of two new teams in the Rochester Royals and Youngstown Bears and the removal of the Pittsburgh Raiders following a hiatus that related to the escalation of conflicts that related to World War II in the first place) ultimately being cancelled in the process. This would unsurprisingly lead to them missing out on participating in the NBL Playoffs this time around, though it would surprisingly be the only time they missed out on the NBL Playoffs in general despite their poor history in the NBL. Following this season's conclusion, the Allmen Transfers would fold operations in the NBL altogether, leading to five NBL teams entering the league that season with the Anderson Duffey Packers, Buffalo Bisons (later Tri-Cities Blackhawks), Detroit Gems, Syracuse Nationals, and Toledo Jeeps being the new teams entering the league for the 1946–47 NBL season, with Syracuse in particular replacing the Allmen Transfers in the process.

== Team seasons ==
Note: W = wins, L = losses, % = win–loss %

Season	W	L	%	Playoffs	Results
Cleveland Chase Brassmen (NBL)
1943–44	3	15	0.167	0–2	Lost NBL Semifinals to Fort Wayne Zollner Pistons
Cleveland Allmen Transfers (NBL)
1944–45	13	17	0.433	0–2	Lost Eastern Division Playoff (Finals) to Fort Wayne
1945–46	4	29	0.121		Did not qualify
