= Bob Sullivan (basketball) =

American basketball and baseball player

Personal information
- Born: July 1, 1921 Saint Paul, Minnesota, U.S.
- Died: April 12, 2007 (aged 85) Manitowoc, Wisconsin, U.S.
- Listed height: 6 ft 0 in (1.83 m)
- Listed weight: 180 lb (82 kg)

Career information
- High school: Hayward (Hayward, Wisconsin)
- College: Wisconsin (1940–1943)
- Playing career: 1943–1952
- Position: Guard / forward

Career history
- 1943–1944, 1945–1948: Oshkosh All-Stars
- 1948–1950: Manitowac
- 1950–1952: Sheboygan

Career highlights
- NCAA champion (1941)

Robert Patrick Sullivan (July 1, 1921 – April 12, 2007) was an American professional basketball player. He played for the Oshkosh All-Stars in the National Basketball League for four total seasons, averaging 3.0 points per game for his career. In college, he played baseball and basketball for the University of Wisconsin, and won a national championship in 1940–41 with the basketball team.

Sullivan played minor league baseball in 1946 and 1947 as well, suiting up for the Green Bay Bluejays in the Wisconsin State League.

After his basketball and baseball careers, Sullivan worked for a process design and build company specializing in the management and monetizing of organic waste streams.
