= Chase Brass and Copper Company =

American manufacturing company

- Traded as: NYSE: BRSS; Russell 2000 Component
- Founded: Waterbury, Connecticut, 1876
- Founder: Henry Sabin Chase
- Headquarters: Montpelier, Ohio, US
- Products: Brass rod, ingots and engineered products
- Parent: Wieland-Werke AG
- Website: www.chasebrass.com

Chase Brass is a leading manufacturer of brass rod, ingot and engineered products in the U.S. Located in Montpelier, Ohio, Chase employs over 200 hourly employees who are represented by the United Steelworkers Union (USW) Local 7248, and 98 salaried employees.

Founded in 1876, in Waterbury, Connecticut, it was one of the brass manufacturers that contributed to Waterbury's nickname "The Brass City". One of the largest brassworks in Waterbury, Chase left the city in 1975.

== Corporate history ==
The company was incorporated in 1876, with Henry Sabin Chase as its founder and first President.

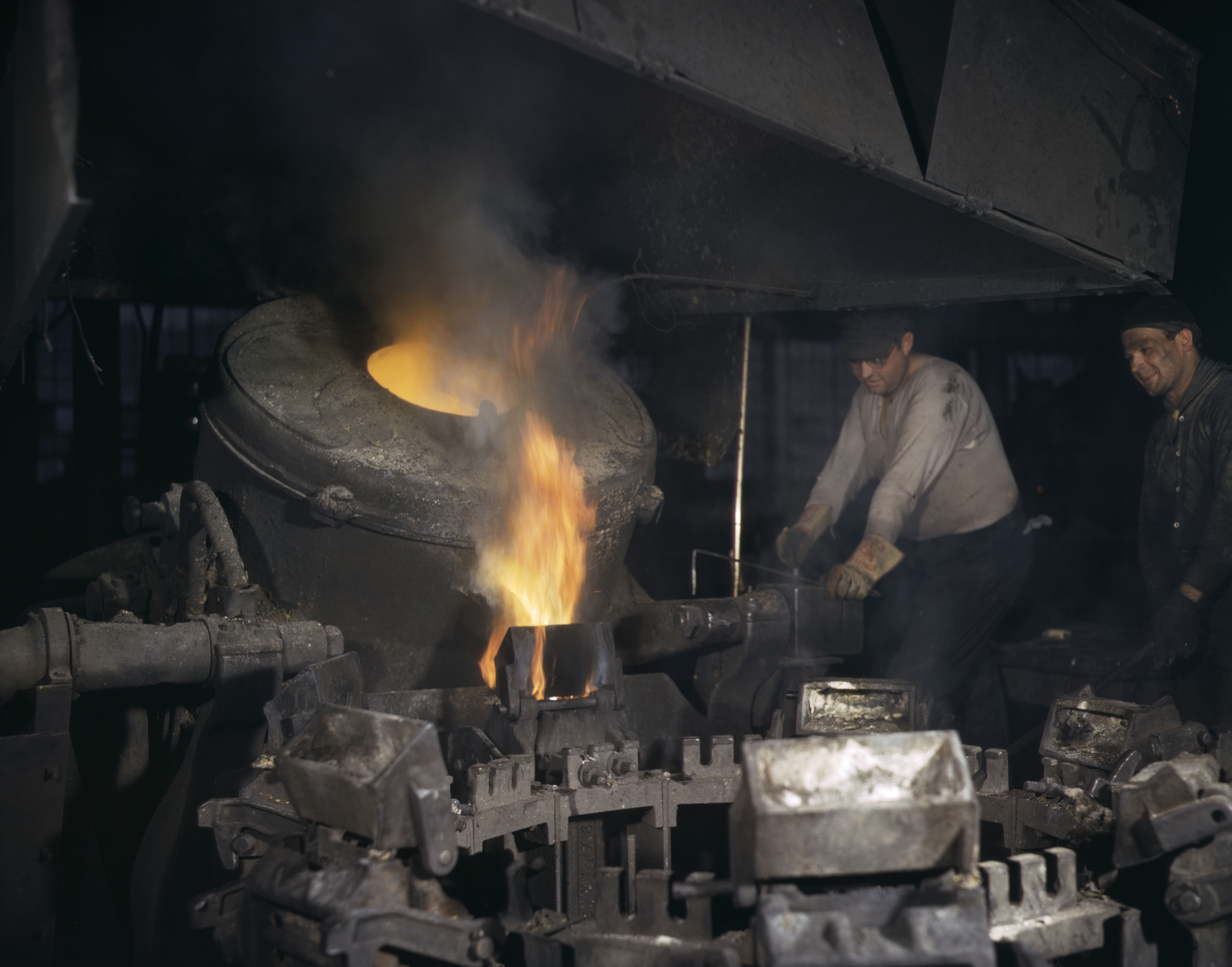
Casting a billet from an electric furnace, Chase Brass and Copper Co., Euclid, Ohio, 1942

In 1929 the company built its first midwestern plant, in Euclid, Ohio. That same year Chase became a subsidiary of Kennecott Utah Copper, which was the largest producer of copper in the U.S., and Ten East 40th St, New York City, the Chase Tower, was finished and named after its first tenant, Chase Brass and Copper. It is now known as the Mercantile Building.

Standard Oil of Ohio (now BP America) acquired Kennecott in 1981 and thus acquired Chase. In 1988, the sheet division was sold to 500 employees of the company through an employee stock ownership plan; the new firm was named North Coast Brass & Copper Co. Only 40 Chase employees were left in the Cleveland area, at its Solon headquarters, though the firm still had two other divisions, in Montpelier, OH, and Shelby, NC.

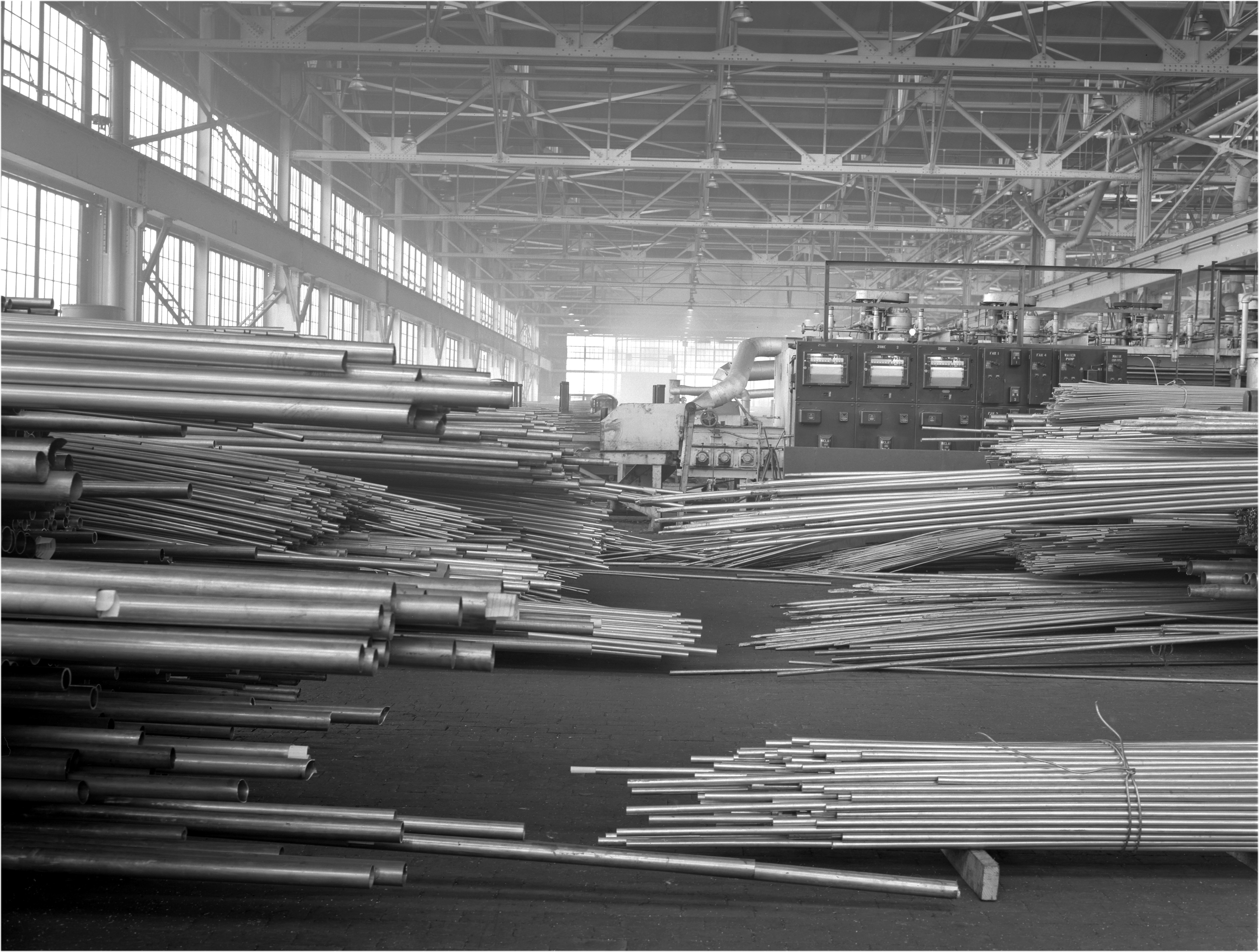
Conversion. Copper and brass processing. The inside of a large brass and copper tube mill, Chase Brass and Copper Company, Euclid, Ohio, February 1942

In 1988, BP was discouraged from selling Chase to TBG Inc., a New York-based manufacturing concern, with a threatened anti-trust action. The Justice Department warned TBG that it intended to file a civil suit to block its proposed $127 million acquisition of Chase Brass. In 1990, BP finally sold the brass rod manufacturing operations in Montpelier, Ohio, the last remaining business unit of its Chase Brass and Copper Co. subsidiary. The rod mill, which then employed about 230 workers, made brass products for plumbing and other uses.

In 1997, the board of directors and shareholders of Chase Brass Industries, Inc. legally changed its name to Chase Industries Inc. The Company's New York Stock Exchange symbol remained "CSI." In 2000, Chase joined a consortium of specialty metal producers, the MetalSpectrum Partnership, to market metals on-line.

As of 2001, Court Square Capital, an affiliate of Citicorp Venture Capital and the Chase Acquisition Corporation, owned 47 percent of Chase's stock, and sales totaled $232 million. In 2002 Olin Corporation purchased Chase Brass and Copper Co. Five years later, private equity fund KPS Capital Partners LP subsidiary Global Brass and Copper Holdings, Inc. ("GBC") acquired Olin's worldwide metals business, including Chase Brass, and now markets products under that name. GBC is publicly traded on the NYSE under BRSS. Chase Brass acquires a license agreement with Sambo Copper Alloy Co., Ltd (now known as Mitsubishi Shindoh, LTD) to sell ECO BRASS C693 and C87850 exclusively in North America. ECO BRASS no-lead properties meet Federal and State lead regulations. Chase Brass sublicensed California Metal-X and Ingot Metal Company Limited to produce and sell ECO BRASS C87850. 2015 marked the 50th anniversary of Chase Brass, Montpelier, Ohio location. This location was opened in 1965 and manufactured one alloy, C360. As of 2016, Chase Brass, Montpelier, produced C360, C377, C345, C350, C353, C370, C363, C27450, ECO BRASS C693, ECO BRASS C87850, ECO BRONZE C87850 and engineered products.

On April 10, 2019, Wieland Group and Global Brass and Copper signed a Merger Agreement, in which Wieland Group acquired Global Brass and Copper. This agreement was subject to a number of closing conditions, all of which have now been met, including approval by Global Brass and Copper stockholders and antitrust clearances, and the acquisition has now been completed.

== Waterbury ==
=== Headquarters ===
The Chase Headquarters Building in Waterbury, Connecticut, is on Grand Street across from the city hall. It is now occupied by the city of Waterbury’s offices. Chase Brass commissioned well-known architect Cass Gilbert to design it in 1916, across from his recently completed Waterbury city hall. Henry Chase, the company president, specifically requested that the headquarters be designed to contrast with the style of the city hall, resulting in a design which shunned colonial marble and brick. The company sold the building to preservationists in 1963 for one dollar, who in turn sold it to the city of Waterbury to be used as city offices, a function it still serves today. It is now known as the Chase Municipal Building and is part of Waterbury's Cass Gilbert Historical District.

=== Local influence ===
The Chase Collegiate School is a private day school formerly known as Saint Margaret's-McTernan, established in 1865. It was founded by Chase Brass and Copper Company. The Chase Dispensary, a medical clinic for employees of the Chase Brass and Copper Co., opened one of the first birth control clinics in the country in 1938.

Henry Sabin Chase gave property in Litchfield to his daughter, Miss Edith Morton Chase, where she created a summer estate. She bequeathed it to the state of Connecticut to be used to create Topsmead State Forest.

A former plant site in Waterbury has been designated as a Superfund Clean-up site.

=== Wartime ===
During World War II, the Chase Brass and Copper Company made more than 50 million cartridge cases and mortar shells, more than a billion small caliber bullets and, eventually, some of the components used in the atomic bomb.

Most of the brass buttons used on Federal uniforms, belt buckles and other fittings, were made in Waterbury, the "Brass City", notably by the Chase Brass and Copper Company.

During that same period of time, Chase Brass also sponsored an official National Basketball League team of their own called the Cleveland Chase Brassmen. Their team would be promoted up from the Amateur Athletic Union due to the NBL losing more teams than they were comfortable with losing during their previous two seasons of play, with the Cleveland Chase Brassmen squad joining the NBL for the 1943–44 season (after renaming themselves from their original Cleveland Chase Copper Brass team name). Despite having a poor 3–15 record that season, they still qualified for the NBL Playoffs (albeit by default) that season, where they would be swept by the eventual champion Fort Wayne Zollner Pistons (now known as the Detroit Pistons of the NBA). Chase Brass would only sponsor them for that one season before selling off their sponsorship to a local company called the Allmen Transfer & Moving Company (thus rebranding them into the Cleveland Allmen Transfers), where they'd continue playing in the NBL for two seasons before having their spot in the NBL (and only that spot in the NBL) be sold off to the Syracuse Nationals (now known as the Philadelphia 76ers of the NBA).

=== Art Deco era ===
Chase entered the consumer market with a line of chrome Art Deco household items in the 1930s, created by leading designers of the day such as Russel Wright, Rockwell Kent and Walter VonNessen. They were usually signed with the distinctive company logo of a centaur drawing a bow. These items are sought after today as collectibles.

Chase discontinued this line in the early '40s, when it turned its attention to wartime production. Chase production of their 'Specialty' items lasted only 12 years, but during that time they issued over 500 items, and 500 more lamps and lighting fixtures.
