= Topsmead State Forest =

Protected area in Connecticut, US

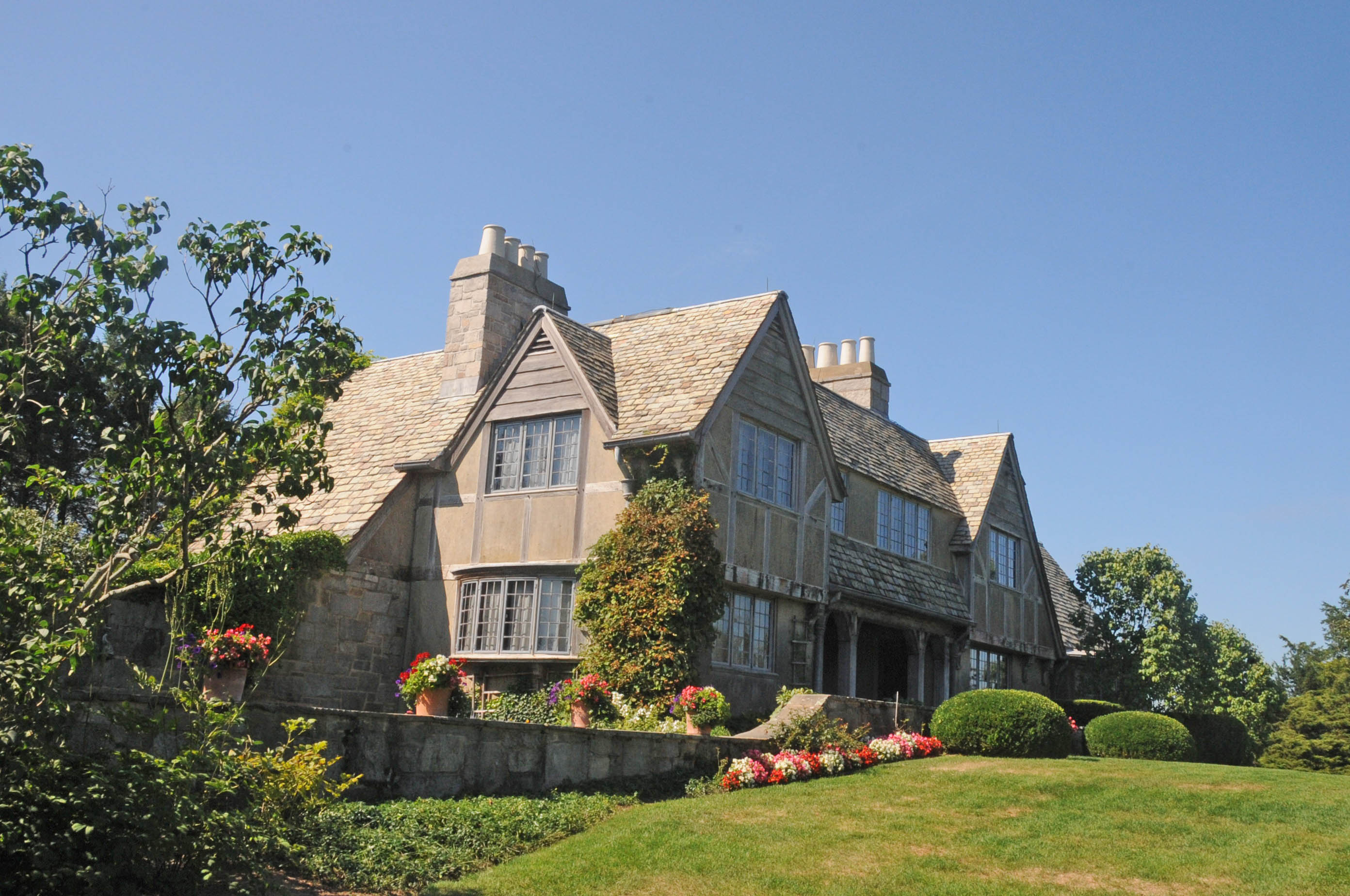
- Topsmead

- Location within Connecticut Location within the United States
- Location: Litchfield, Connecticut, United States
- Coordinates: 41°44′49″N 73°09′36″W
- Area: 615 acres (249 ha)
- Established: 1972
- Administrator: Connecticut Department of Energy and Environmental Protection
- Website: Official website
- Topsmead
- U.S. National Register of Historic Places
- Area: 511 acres (207 ha)
- Built: 1924
- Architect: Dana, Richard Henry
- Architectural style: Tudor Revival, Colonial Revival
- NRHP reference No.: 93001243
- Added to NRHP: November 19, 1993

Topsmead State Forest is a Connecticut state forest located in the town of Litchfield. It was formerly the summer residence of Edith Morton Chase, daughter of Henry Sabin Chase, first president of the Chase Brass and Copper Company. She left the house and its grounds to the state of Connecticut on her death in 1972. The estate house, built in 1929 to a design by Richard Henry Dana, is a fine example of a Tudor Revival country estate house, and is listed on the National Register of Historic Places.

== Setting ==
Topsmead State Forest consists of more than 600 acres (240 ha) of land in eastern Litchfield. It is bounded on the east by Buell Road, the west by Connecticut Route 254, and is crossed in its northern sections by East Litchfield Road and Connecticut Route 118. Most of the forest area consists of a hill rising to an elevation of 1,230 feet (370 m). The main park entrance is on Chase Road, off Buell Road. From the parking area on Chase Road, trails branch out through the forest holdings, a combination of open and wooded areas.

Near the center of the forest, and near the top of the hill, stands the former estate house of Edith Morton Chase. It is a large two-story structure, with stucco half-timbered walls in the Tudor Revival style. A central section is flanked by cross-gabled wings, with large westward projection that houses a great living room with a tall ceiling. The interior is decorated in 1920s style, and retains original fixtures and finishes. The area around the house is informally landscaped, continued the practice of Edith Morton Chase, for whom it was built.

== Recreational uses ==
The forest is open daily until sunset. In the warmer months the state sometimes offers tours of the estate house, which is otherwise closed to public access. The trails on the property support hiking and horse riding. Hunting is permitted, in season with the appropriate permits, in the forest area north of Route 118.

== History ==
Creation of the forest began in 1916, when Henry Sabin Chase purchased 16 acres (6.5 ha) at the summit of the hill. Chase, owner of one of the most successful metalworking business in Waterbury, Chase Brass and Copper Company died in 1917 and gave the property to his daughter Edith Morton Chase (1890-1972). Chase's daughter Edith took over the property after her father's death, and built a small cottage first and later a Tudor-revival style cottage on the summit overlooking an orchard. The present estate house was built in 1924, incorporating elements of the cottage into its form. The house was designed by New York City architect Richard Henry Dana (1879-1933), grandson of Richard Henry Dana Jr. Miss Chase occupied the property as a summer residence, and operated much of the surrounding property, which she purchased in stages, as a farm. She bequeathed the property, then over 500 acres (200 ha) to the State Forest Commission of Connecticut upon her death in 1972, along with an endowment for its maintenance. The bulk of the forest was listed on the National Register of Historic Places in 1993. The house is open for tours seasonally and operated today by the Connecticut Department of Energy and Environmental Protection.

== See also ==
- National Register of Historic Places listings in Litchfield County, Connecticut
