= Bill Brownell =

American basketball player and coach

Personal information
- Listed height: 6 ft 6 in (1.98 m)
- Listed weight: 235 lb (107 kg)
- Position: Center

Career history

Playing
- 1941: Toledo Jim White Chevrolets
- 1943: Cleveland Chase Brassmen

Coaching
- 1943–1944: Cleveland Chase Brassmen

William Brownell was an American professional basketball player and coach. Brownell played in the National Basketball League for the Toledo Jim White Chevrolets in 1941–42 and the Cleveland Chase Brassmen in 1943–44. He averaged 2.0 points per game in five career games played. While playing for Cleveland, Brownell also served as their head coach for the final one-third of the season after Vito Kubilus was relieved of the role.
