= Gordon Flick =

American basketball player (1921–2006)

Personal information
- Born: August 13, 1921 Minneapolis, Minnesota, U.S.
- Died: March 22, 2006 (aged 84) Oceanside, California, U.S.
- Listed height: 6 ft 3 in (1.91 m)
- Listed weight: 200 lb (91 kg)

Career information
- College: Drake (1945–1948)
- NBA draft: 1948: undrafted
- Position: Center / forward

Career history
- 1943: Oshkosh All-Stars
- 1948: Waterloo Hawks
- 1950–1951: Des Moines
- Stats at Basketball Reference

Gordon Peter Flick (August 13, 1921 – March 22, 2006) was an American professional basketball player. He played in the National Basketball League for the Oshkosh All-Stars (three games in 1943–44) and Waterloo Hawks (two games in 1948–49), where he averaged 1.6 points per game for his career. He played professionally prior to enrolling at Drake University in the 1940s, where he was later named to the school's All-1940s Team.
