= Leo Osiewalski =

American basketball player

Personal information
- Born: September 25, 1921 Hofa Park, Wisconsin, U.S.
- Died: February 23, 1985 (aged 63) Waukesha, Wisconsin, U.S.
- Listed height: 6 ft 4 in (1.93 m)
- Listed weight: 190 lb (86 kg)

Career information
- High school: Menasha (Menasha, Wisconsin)
- Position: Forward

Career history
- 1942–1943: Clintonvilee Truckers
- 1943–1944: Oshkosh All-Stars
- 1945–1946: Baltimore Bullets

Leo Francis Osiewalski (September 25, 1921 – February 23, 1985), also known as Leo Oswall, was an American professional basketball player. He played for the Oshkosh All-Stars in the National Basketball League during the 1943–44 season, and then for the Baltimore Bullets in the American Basketball League in 1945–46.
