= Hank Riebe =

American baseball player (1921–2001)

- Catcher
- Born: October 10, 1921; Cleveland, Ohio, U.S.
- Died: April 16, 2001 (aged 79); Cleveland, Ohio, U.S.
- Batted: Right Threw: Right

MLB debut
- August 26, 1942, for the Detroit Tigers

Last MLB appearance
- September 17, 1949, for the Detroit Tigers

MLB statistics
- Batting average: .212
- Home runs: 0
- Runs batted in: 11
- Stats at Baseball Reference

Teams
- Detroit Tigers (1942; 1947–1949)

Harvey Donald "Hank" Riebe (October 10, 1921 – April 16, 2001) was an American Major League Baseball catcher for four seasons with the Detroit Tigers (1942, 1947–1949). He also received a Bronze Star and two Purple Heart medals while serving in the United States Army during World War II. He was a survivor of the sinking of the troopship SS Leopoldville off the coast of France on December 24, 1944, in which 763 soldiers lost their lives.

Born in Cleveland, Ohio, Riebe signed with the Detroit Tigers after graduating from Euclid Shore High School in Cleveland. Riebe played in the minor leagues in Beaumont, Texas, Alexandria, Louisiana, Muskegon, Michigan, Henderson, Texas, and Winston-Salem, North Carolina. Rieber later recalled: "Detroit really moved players around a lot."

In August 1942, the Tigers called Riebe up to the big leagues. He played his first major league game in Philadelphia on August 26, 1942, in the second game of a Sunday double-header. Riebe hit a two-run double down the left field line. He went 2-for-4 in his major league debut and 4-for-4 a week later in his first game at Briggs Stadium. In all, Riebe hit .314 in 11 games for the Tigers in 1942.

After a promising start to his baseball career, Riebe was drafted into the U.S. Army after the 1942 season ended. He served in the 66th Infantry Division in Europe. On Christmas Eve 1944, Riebe was aboard the SS Leopoldville headed for Cherbourg, France, when it was sunk by torpedoes fired by a German U-boat. Riebe floated in the icy water of the English Channel and a Coast Guard cutter pulled him out. Over 750 American troops lost their lives in the sinking of the Leopoldville. Riebe was awarded a Purple Heart medal for injuries suffered in the Leopoldville sinking and later served with the 66th Infantry as it moved across Europe. In the spring of 1945, Riebe was injured by shrapnel from German artillery, earning his second Purple Heart award.

Riebe recalled listening on the radio from a tent in France as his teammates on the Detroit Tigers won the 1945 World Series.

Released from the military in early 1946, Riebe returned to the Tigers for spring training in 1946, but he did not make the team. He played the 1946 season in the minor leagues with Buffalo and Dallas.

In 1947, Riebe was elevated back to the major leagues but was the Tigers' third catcher behind Bob Swift and Birdie Tebbetts. Riebe played in only 8 games in 1946 and went hitless in 7 at-bats. When the Tigers acquired yet another catcher, Hal Wagner, Riebe was sent to Memphis in the minor leagues.

Riebe played briefly for the Tigers in 1948 and 1949, but he never came close to his .314 batting average of 1942. He hit .194 in 25 games in 1948 and .182 in 17 games in 1949. He played his last major league game for the Tigers on September 17, 1949.

Riebe played in a total of 61 major league games and had a career batting average of .212 and 11 RBIs.

Riebe also played for the Toledo Mud Hens in 1950 before retiring from baseball at age 28.

From 1951 to 1977, Riebe worked for a brass and copper company in Cleveland. He died of cancer in 2001 at age 79. He was born and died in Cleveland.

Riebe's brothers Mel Riebe and Bill Riebe played professional basketball in the National Basketball Association from 1944 to 1949.
