= George Jablonski =

American basketball player (1919–1992)

Personal information
- Born: July 18, 1919 Milwaukee, Wisconsin, U.S.
- Died: June 1, 1992 (aged 72) Franklin, Pennsylvania, U.S.
- Listed height: 6 ft 7 in (2.01 m)
- Listed weight: 215 lb (98 kg)

Career information
- High school: East Division (Milwaukee, Wisconsin)
- College: Milwaukee (1939–1942)
- Position: Center

Career history

Playing
- 1942–1943: Artistic Cleaners
- 1942–1943: Sheboygan Red Skins
- 1946–1947: Milwaukee Shooting Stars

Coaching
- 1943–1945: Cathedral HS

Career highlights
- NBL champion (1943)

George Gerard Jablonski (July 18, 1919 – June 1, 1992), whose last name is often misspelled as Jablonsky, was an American professional basketball player. He played for the Sheboygan Red Skins in the National Basketball League during the 1942–43 season, averaged 1.7 points per game, and won the league championship. He also coached high school basketball at Cathedral High School in Milwaukee, Wisconsin for two years.
