= 1943–44 Cleveland Chase Brassmen season =

NBL professional basketball team season

- Head coach: Vito Kubilus (player-coach; 1–11); Bill Brownell (player-coach; 2–4)
- Owner: Chase Brass
- Arena: Public Auditorium; Euclid Shore High School (Late season games); Notre Dame-Cathedral Latin School (Playoffs)

Results
- Record: 3–15 (.167)
- Playoff finish: Lost NBL Semifinals to Fort Wayne Zollner Pistons, 2–0

The 1943–44 Cleveland Chase Brassmen season was the first and technically only season of the Cleveland Chase Brassmen playing in the United States' National Basketball League (NBL), which would also be the seventh year the NBL itself existed. However, if one were to count the seasons where they played as the Cleveland Chase Copper Brass team in the Amateur Athletic Union starting as early as 1935 back when the NBL technically first began as the Midwest Basketball Conference, then this would officially be their ninth season of overall play. The Cleveland Chase Brassmen franchise would get themselves promoted from the Amateur Athletic Union to the NBL (changing their team name from the Cleveland Chase Copper Brass team name they originally had in the process) in order to help ensure that the NBL would even play another season with four teams again after they previously played their prior season with only four teams for a majority of their season earlier on and one of those teams that season in the Chicago Studebaker Flyers (a team the Chase Brassmen did not take their history from despite some claims made at one point in time) left the league early that offseason period.

Despite the worthwhile intentions made by the NBL, however, their promotion would also showcase the Cleveland squad being a team that was a bit too above their heads in terms of how they'd perform as a professional basketball franchise after previously being an amateur franchise for years, despite the new addition of longtime New York Renaissance center Wee Willie Smith being on their team. While Cleveland ended the 1943 year with only one home win out of four games played against the Oshkosh All-Stars, they would only get two more home games won throughout the rest of the season (with the Chase Brassmen both switching head coach Vito Kubilus with Bill Brownell after their 12th game of the season and being the only NBL team to play 18 games this season when everyone else played the regular 22 games this season) to end the season with a 3–15 season (with all three of their victories being against the Oshkosh All-Stars). Despite Cleveland's poor record and uneven number of games played, the Chase Brassmen would make it to the 1944 NBL Playoffs (albeit by default) with Mel Riebe being the league's leading scorer, though they would end up getting swept by the eventual champion Fort Wayne Zollner Pistons in the semifinal round. After participating in the 1944 World Professional Basketball Tournament, Cleveland would return to the NBL, but they would change sponsorship ownership rights from the Chase Brass and Copper Company to the Allmen Transfer & Moving Company to have the team become the Cleveland Allmen Transfers for the rest of their existence going forward.

This season would also be notable for Mel Riebe making his professional basketball career debut after previously playing with the team in their days through the Amateur Athletic Union; he would later be named the NBL's Rookie of the Year and be a member of the All-NBL First Team there.

== Roster ==
Please note that due to the way records for professional basketball leagues like the NBL and the ABL were recorded at the time, some information on both teams and players may be harder to list out than usual here.

Player	Position
Bill Brownell	C
Hal Cihlar	F-C
Ned Endress	G-F
Frank Garcia	G-F
Vito Kubilus	G-F
Pete Lalich	F-C
John Poncar	F-C
Bill Riebe	G
Mel Riebe	G-F
Wee Willie Smith	C
Willard Swihart	F-C

In addition to that, their roster for the 1944 World Professional Basketball Tournament would notably contain the absence of center Wee Willie Smith, who would be playing for the all-black New York Renaissance for that event instead of the Cleveland Chase Brassmen.

=== Season statistics ===
Rk	Player	Pos	G	FG	FT	PTS	FGA	FTM	PPG
1	Mel Riebe	G-F	18	113	97	323	6.3	5.4	17.9*
2	Bill Riebe	G	18	44	23	111	2.4	1.3	6.2
3	Pete Lalich	F-C	17	44	21	109	2.6	1.2	6.4
4	Ned Endress	G-F	16	25	15	65	1.6	0.9	4.1
5	Willard Swihart	F-C	15	14	11	39	0.9	0.7	2.6
6	Vito Kubilus	G-F	16	11	10	32	0.7	0.6	2.0
7	John Poncar	F-C	18	11	8	30	0.6	0.4	1.7
8	Wee Willie Smith	C	4	9	6	24	2.3	1.5	6.0
9	Frank Garcia	G-F	7	8	7	23	1.1	1.0	3.3
10	Hal Cihlar	F-C	4	0	1	1	0.0	0.3	0.3
11	Bill Brownell	C	1	0	0	0	0.0	0.0	0.0

* – Led the entire NBL in points scored this season.

Mel Riebe led the team in free throw attempts with 7.4 free-throw attempts per game (with him having 134 total free-throw attempts this season), with the rest of the players not having their free-throw attempts be known (for the most part) in the reference below.

== Regular season ==
=== Season standings ===
Pos.	League Standings	Wins	Losses	Win %
1	Fort Wayne Zollner Pistons	18	4	.818
2	Sheboygan Red Skins	14	8	.636
3	Oshkosh All-Stars	7	15	.318
4	Cleveland Chase Brassmen	3	15	.167

=== NBL Schedule ===
An official database created by John Grasso detailing every NBL match possible (outside of two matches that the Kankakee Gallagher Trojans won over the Dayton Metropolitans in 1938) would be released in 2026 showcasing every team's official schedules throughout their time spent in the NBL. As such, these are the official results recorded for the Cleveland Chase Brassmen during their first season in the NBL and their only NBL season under that specific team name.

- December 12, 1943 @ Cleveland, OH: Sheboygan Red Skins 47, Cleveland Chase Brassmen 41
- December 22, 1943 @ Cleveland, OH: Oshkosh All-Stars 51, Cleveland Chase Brassmen 56
- December 25, 1943 @ Fort Wayne, IN: Cleveland Chase Brassmen 42, Fort Wayne Zollner Pistons 43
- December 26, 1943 @ Cleveland, OH: Fort Wayne Zollner Pistons 47, Cleveland Chase Brassmen 41
- January 1, 1944 @ Oshkosh, WI: Cleveland Chase Brassmen 27, Oshkosh All-Stars 42
- January 2, 1944 @ Sheboygan, WI: Cleveland Chase Brassmen 36, Sheboygan Red Skins 37
- January 4, 1944 @ Cleveland, OH: Oshkosh All-Stars 52, Cleveland Chase Brassmen 45
- January 11, 1944 @ Cleveland, OH: Sheboygan Red Skins 36, Cleveland Chase Brassmen 30
- January 16, 1944 @ Sheboygan, WI: Cleveland Chase Brassmen 44, Sheboygan Red Skins 52
- January 18, 1944 @ Fort Wayne, IN: Cleveland Chase Brassmen 42, Fort Wayne Zollner Pistons 44
- January 23, 1944 @ Oshkosh, WI: Cleveland Chase Brassmen 40, Oshkosh All-Stars 69
- January 30, 1944 @ Fort Wayne, IN: Cleveland Chase Brassmen 30, Fort Wayne Zollner Pistons 51
- February 6, 1944 @ Sheboygan, WI: Cleveland Chase Brassmen 45, Sheboygan Red Skins 46
- February 9, 1944 @ Cleveland, OH: Oshkosh All-Stars 33, Cleveland Chase Brassmen 47
- February 13, 1944 @ Cleveland, OH: Fort Wayne Zollner Pistons 54, Cleveland Chase Brassmen 50
- February 19, 1944 @ Cleveland, OH: Sheboygan Red Skins 55, Cleveland Chase Brassmen 46
- February 23, 1944 @ Cleveland, OH: Cleveland Chase Brassmen 37, Fort Wayne Zollner Pistons 49
- February 27, 1944 @ Oshkosh, WI: Cleveland Chase Brassmen 54, Oshkosh All-Stars 49

It's suggested that during this season, the Cleveland Chase Brassmen would cancel three different home and road games that they had originally scheduled against each one of the Fort Wayne Zollner Pistons, Oshkosh All-Stars, and Sheboygan Red Skins, meaning the other three NBL teams would play 22 regular season games while Cleveland would only play a grand total of 18 regular season games for this season.

== NBL Playoffs ==
=== NBL Semifinals ===
(4) Cleveland Chase Brassmen vs. (1) Fort Wayne Zollner Pistons: Fort Wayne wins series 2–0

- Game 1: March 5, 1944 @ Fort Wayne: Fort Wayne 64, Cleveland 37
- Game 2: March 7, 1944 @ Cleveland: Fort Wayne 42, Cleveland 31

== Awards and honors ==
- Mel Riebe – NBL Rookie of the Year, All-NBL First Team, NBL MVP co-winner (won honor alongside Bobby McDermott), NBL All-Time Team

== World Professional Basketball Tournament ==
For the first time ever, the Cleveland Chase Brassmen would enter the annual World Professional Basketball Tournament in Chicago, which the 1944 event was held on March 20–24, 1944 and was mostly held by independently ran teams alongside the four remaining NBL teams from this season due in part to World War II. In the first round, the Chase Brassmen would compete against the Indianapolis Pure Oils, who were actually the Indianapolis Kautskys team that briefly returned to the NBL before leaving due to World War II, though decided to compete under the temporary independent moniker of the Indianapolis Pure Oils. Despite the Chase Brassmen having a brutal NBL season on their ends, they would still end up proving to be a better team than the Indianapolis roster they went up against (thanks primarily due to the scoring efforts of Mel Riebe), with Cleveland winning 55–52 over the Pure Oils franchise in their last season under that temporary name before becoming the Oilers in the following year's event (with the Oilers later losing in the first round that year as well).

In the quarterfinal round, the Chase Brassmen franchise would go up against the New York Renaissance, who would technically return to the WPBT this year after taking the previous year's event off while having their players participate in that event under the Washington Bears name, as well as take away Wee Willie Smith from Cleveland's roster for this event. While Mel Riebe would try his best to help the Chase Brassmen out with proving another upset in the WPBT, the strength of the Renaissance (with Wee Willie Smith joining them, to boot) would prove to be far too great for Cleveland to overcome, as the Chase Brassmen were blown out 62–38 by the all-black Renaissance franchise. The Renaissance would later lose their semifinal game to the NBL and eventual WPBT champion Fort Wayne Zollner Pistons and then their third place consolation prize game to the Harlem Globetrotters soon afterward. Despite Cleveland not even making it to the semifinal round, Mel Riebe would be named a member of the All-Tournament First Team for his scoring prowess, similar to what he had done in the NBL's season there.

=== Scores ===
- Won first round (55–52) over the Indianapolis Pure Oils
- Lost quarterfinal round (38–62) to the New York Renaissance

=== Awards and honors ===
- Mel Riebe, All-Tournament First Team
