= Bill Riebe =

American basketball player

Personal information
- Born: August 15, 1917 Cleveland, Ohio, U.S.
- Died: February 6, 2000 (aged 82) Mayfield Heights, Ohio, U.S.
- Listed height: 5 ft 11 in (1.80 m)
- Listed weight: 175 lb (79 kg)

Career information
- High school: Euclid (Euclid, Ohio)
- Position: Guard

Career history
- 1943–1944: Cleveland Chase Brassmen
- 1944–1946: Cleveland Allmen Transfers
- 1946–1947: Cleveland Rosenblums

Willard Roy Riebe (August 15, 1917 – February 6, 2000) was an American professional basketball player. He played in the National Basketball League for the Cleveland Chase Brassmen / Allmen Transfers between the 1943–44 and 1945–46 seasons. Riebe averaged 3.5 points per game.
