= David Riebe =

Swedish composer (born 1988)

David Riebe (born 1 May 1988, in Hällestad, Skåne, Sweden) is a Swedish composer who has won second prize in Uppsala Composition Competition (Swedish: Uppsala tonsättartävling) in Sweden and third prize in the All-Russian Open Composers’ Competition in Honor of Andrey Petrov (Russian: Всероссийский открытый конкурс композиторов им. А.П. Петрова) in Saint Petersburg, Russia. In 2015 he was elected a member of the Swedish Society of Composers (Föreningen svenska tonsättare).

Riebe has a master's degree in composition from the Malmö Academy of Music in Sweden where he studied with Luca Francesconi, Rolf Martinsson, Staffan Storm and Kent Olofsson. He has also studied with Michele Tadini and Philippe Hurel at Conservatoire National Supérieur Musique et Danse (CNSMD) in Lyon, France.

== Awards and honours ==
- 2012 – The Culture Grant of Lund Municipality
- 2014 – Second prize in Uppsala Composition Competition (Swedish: Uppsala tonsättartävling) with the work Geopoliticus Child
- 2016 – Third prize in "10th All-Russian composers’ open competition in honor of Andrey Petrov" with the work Magma

== Selected works ==
- 2013 – Geopoliticus Child for sinfonietta
- 2015 – Magma for symphonic orchestra
- 2015 – Time Reflections for symphonic orchestra
