= Bob Regh =

American basketball player (1912–1999)

Personal information
- Born: October 11, 1912 Kenosha, Wisconsin, U.S.
- Died: June 24, 1999 (aged 86) Wellington, Nevada, U.S.
- Listed height: 6 ft 2 in (1.88 m)
- Listed weight: 190 lb (86 kg)

Career information
- High school: Hammond Tech (Hammond, Indiana)
- Position: Shooting guard / small forward

Career history
- 1939–1940: Kenosha Bernacchis
- 1940–1941: Hollywood MGM
- 1942–1943: Kenosha McWhytes
- 1942–1944: Sheboygan Red Skins

Career highlights
- NBL champion (1943)

Robert Peter Regh (October 11, 1912 – June 24, 1999) was an American professional basketball player. He played for the Sheboygan Red Skins in the National Basketball League and averaged 1.0 point per game. Regh also competed in independent leagues as well as the Amateur Athletic Union.

In 1942–43 he won the NBL championship while playing for the Red Skins.
