= Harold Dahl (basketball) =

American basketball player

Personal information
- Born: October 19, 1923 Oshkosh, Wisconsin, U.S.
- Died: April 1, 2015 (aged 91) Oshkosh, Wisconsin, U.S.
- Listed height: 5 ft 9 in (1.75 m)
- Listed weight: 190 lb (86 kg)

Career information
- High school: St. Mary's (Oshkosh, Wisconsin)
- Position: Forward

Career history
- 1941–1944: Oshkosh All-Stars

Harold Kenneth Dahl (October 19, 1923 – April 1, 2015) was an American professional basketball player. He played in the National Basketball League for the Oshkosh All-Stars and averaged 0.8 points per game.
