= Wee Willie Smith =

American basketball player (1911–1992)

Willie Smith
Personal information
- Born: April 22, 1911 Montgomery, Alabama, U.S.
- Died: March 15, 1992 (aged 80) Cleveland, Ohio, U.S.
- Listed height: 6 ft 5 in (1.96 m)
- Listed weight: 230 lb (104 kg)

Career information
- High school: East Tech (Cleveland, Ohio)
- Playing career: 1931–1949
- Position: Center

Career history
- 1931–1945: New York Renaissance
- 1943–1944: Cleveland Chase Brassmen
- 1948–1949: Dayton Rens

William T. "Wee Willie" Smith (April 22, 1911 – March 14, 1992) was an American professional basketball player.

== Career ==
Smith played for several semi-professional leagues in the Cleveland, Ohio area before being signed by the New York Renaissance, an all-black professional team, in 1932. From 1932 to 1936, Smith and his six teammates won over 400 games, including an 88-game winning streak from January 1, 1933, to March 27, 1933. The entire 1932–33 Renaissance team was collectively inducted into the Naismith Memorial Basketball Hall of Fame in 1963. Smith played for several other professional teams, including the Cleveland Chase Brassmen of the National Basketball League. He was one of the few black players in the history of the NBL.

In 1945, one year after previously playing for the Cleveland Chase Brassmen for the National Basketball League, Smith would be a second team member of what was deemed the "All-Time Stars of Professional Basketball", which consisted of votes from the six general managers from the teams playing in the 1944–45 NBL season. Smith would end up being the only African American player to be considered for such an honor by the people who voted for the players in question to be on the listed honored teams. He would be joined alongside two former Original Celtics and Cleveland Rosenblums players in Joe Lapchick and Nat Hickey (the latter of whom was playing for the Pittsburgh Raiders at the time despite him being the oldest player in the NBL by this point in time) and two Fort Wayne Zollner Pistons players in Jerry Bush and Buddy Jeannette from the NBL.

After retiring from professional basketball, he worked as a custodian in the Cleveland Public Schools and operated a beverage shop. He was inducted into the Harlem Hall of Fame and the Greater Cleveland Sports Hall of Fame in 1977.
