= Mel Riebe =

American basketball player (1916–1977)

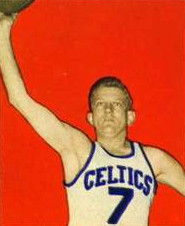
- Riebe in 1948

Personal information
- Born: July 12, 1916 Cleveland, Ohio, U.S.
- Died: July 25, 1977 (aged 61)
- Listed height: 5 ft 11 in (1.80 m)
- Listed weight: 180 lb (82 kg)

Career information
- High school: Euclid (Cleveland, Ohio)
- Playing career: 1943–1949
- Position: Shooting guard / small forward
- Number: 3, 7, 9, 5

Career history
- 1943–1944: Cleveland Chase Brassmen
- 1944–1945: Cleveland Allmen Transfers
- 1946–1947: Cleveland Rebels
- 1947–1949: Boston Celtics
- 1949: Providence Steamrollers

Career highlights
- 2× All-NBL First Team (1944, 1945); NBL Rookie of the Year (1944); 2× NBL scoring champion (1944, 1945)
- Stats at NBA.com
- Stats at Basketball Reference

Melvin Russell Riebe (July 12, 1916 – July 25, 1977) was an American professional basketball player.

A 5'11" guard-forward who also played minor league baseball in the Cleveland Indians' organization, Riebe played professionally in both the National Basketball League (1943–1945) and the Basketball Association of America (1946–1949), finishing his career with two seasons with the Boston Celtics. He led the NBL in scoring twice, averaging 17.9 points per game during the 1943–44 season and 20.2 points per game the following year as a member of the Cleveland Chase Brassmen and the Cleveland Allmen Transfers.

From 1950 to 1954 he attended the College of Wooster, where he was ineligible to play basketball or baseball due to his professional experience but played on the golf team. He spent the rest of his life as a football and basketball coach, athletic director, and physical education teacher at Waynedale High School in Apple Creek, Ohio.

Riebe's brother, Hank Riebe, was a catcher in Major League Baseball from 1942 to 1949.

== BAA career statistics ==
Legend
GP	Games played	FG%	Field-goal percentage
FT%	Free-throw percentage	APG	Assists per game
PPG	Points per game	**Bold**	Career high

=== Regular season ===
Year	Team	GP	FG%	FT%	APG	PPG
1946–47	Cleveland	**55**	.307	**.642**	1.2	**12.1**
1947–48	Boston	48	**.309**	.620	.9	10.2
1948–49	Boston	33	.291	.603	**2.9**	11.0
1948–49	Providence	10	.295	.529	.9	6.1
Career		146	.304	.621	1.5	10.8

=== Playoffs ===
Year	Team	GP	FG%	FT%	APG	PPG
1947	Cleveland	**3**	.243	.500	.7	7.0
1948	Boston	**3**	**.326**	**.700**	**1.0**	**14.0**
Career		6	.288	.654	.8	10.5
