= National Basketball League (United States) =

U.S. professional basketball league (1937–1949)

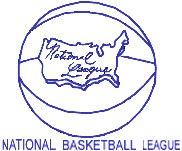
- Sport: Basketball
- Founded: 1935 (as MBC); October 6, 1937 (as NBL)
- First season: 1935–36 (as MBC); 1937–38 (as NBL)
- Folded: October 6, 1937 (became NBL); August 3, 1949 (merged with BAA to form NBA)
- No. of teams: 38 (overall)
- Country: United States
- Last champion: Anderson Duffey Packers (1st title)
- Most titles: Akron Firestone Non-Skids; Fort Wayne Zollner Pistons; Oshkosh All-Stars (2 each)

The National Basketball League (NBL) was one of the oldest professional basketball leagues created in the United States. Established in 1935 as the Midwest Basketball Conference, it changed its name to the National Basketball League on October 6, 1937, weeks before it was set to begin its third season of play.

Before the NBL was created, the best basketball teams were barnstorming operations like the Original Celtics, the New York Renaissance, the Harlem Globetrotters, and the Philadelphia Sphas (some of whom also played in the rival American Basketball League). After the 1948–49 season, the NBL merged operations with the Basketball Association of America (BAA) to form the National Basketball Association (NBA). Despite being younger than the NBL, the BAA was considered more prestigious due to its presence in larger cities. The modern NBA has adopted the BAA's history as its own, with the NBL's history garnering only occasional recognition.

Five current NBA teams trace their history back to the NBL: the Atlanta Hawks (formerly the Buffalo Bisons/Tri-Cities Blackhawks), the Detroit Pistons (formerly the Fort Wayne Zollner Pistons), the Los Angeles Lakers (formerly the Detroit Gems/Minneapolis Lakers), the Philadelphia 76ers (formerly the Syracuse Nationals), and the Sacramento Kings (formerly the Rochester Royals, though their history dates back to 1923 as the Rochester Seagrams). Six former BAA/NBA teams also traced their roots to the NBL: the Indianapolis Jets (formerly the Indianapolis Kautskys), the Anderson Packers (formerly the Anderson Duffey Packers), the original Denver Nuggets (not to be confused with the current Denver Nuggets NBA team that exists from the former Denver Rockets ABA team), the Sheboygan Red Skins, the Waterloo Hawks, and the Indianapolis Olympians (who were meant to be an NBL expansion team before joining the NBA instead). Another NBL team that is still active is the Akron Goodyear Wingfoots, who currently play as an Amateur Athletic Union Elite club.

== History ==
=== Predecessor history ===
The NBL was initially founded as the Midwest Basketball Conference (MBC) in 1935. The league was created by Frank Kautsky (who owned Kautsky's Grocery store in Indianapolis) and Paul Sheeks (who was the athletic and recreation director for the Firestone Tire and Rubber Company in Akron, Ohio), who both wanted to resurrect the defunct National Professional Basketball League, which had played for a single season in 1932-33. The NPBL had included the works teams Kautsky and Sheeks owned and operated-which were the Indianapolis Kautskys and Akron Firestone Non-Skids (reportedly then known as the Akron Firestones) respectively. Seven other teams began the season-the Toledo Crimson Coaches Tobaccos (the only other winning team that season), the Akron Goodyear Wingfoots (supposedly named the Akron Goodyear Webfoots that season), Fort Wayne Chiefs, Muncie Whys, South Bend Guardsmen, Kokomo Kelts, and Lorain Fisher Foods. However, the dropouts of Lorain, Kokomo, Muncie, and South Bend left the league with only five teams at the end of the season, with the Goodyear team only having 6 games played in that league.).

Kautsky and Sheeks created the new league with no real plan of action outside of being what can be considered an amateur or semi-professional basketball league of sorts (with the players there also working for the sponsorship they had played for under this time) with good competition in mind. One of the ways they made sure the sport was competitive was by eliminating rules which had previously slowed the game down significantly (such as having a jump ball after every foul shot, if not every shot in general), which helped make sure the game's action remained consistent with its flow in its first season (with the following season later removing jump balls after every basket made in general). They also implemented rules that would (mostly) be used to help become the set predecessors for modern-era basketball to this day as opposed to the roughhouse sport that it was considered to be back in that period of time. Games played in at least their first season were done on the weekends (usually Sunday afternoons) since teams could schedule non-league games on later days of their weeks, partially due to blue laws in the United States and appealing to people in relation to them.

During their two seasons under the Midwest Basketball Conference name, they had a total of 16 different teams competing throughout the league (though two of them were slated to be a rebranding of a different team from the first to the second season), with as many as 12 teams, but as few as 8 (later 9) teams competing at any given time during their regular seasons. The teams that competed in the MBC were mostly works teams teams (alongside the aforementioned Kautskys and Firestone Non-Skids, businesses like Hed-Aids, U.S. Tire, Inc., the Young Men's Hebrew Association (labeled as the Y.M.H.A.), the Dayton Metropolitan Clothing Stores, Cooper Buses (being the only Canadian-based team to enter the MBC coming from Windsor, Ontario, thus making the MBC the first ever international basketball league in existence ahead of the Basketball Association of America), and the Duffy Florals later on had teams in their inaugural season, with Goodyear, Altes Lagers (representing a rebranding from the Hed-Aids to the Altes Lagers for the Detroit franchise), the Miami Valley Brewing Company (representing a rebranding from the Metropolitans to the London Bobbys), the Columbus Athletic Supply (using the same name for their team), General Electric, and HyVis Oil (being referred to as HyVis Oilers sometimes) having teams for the following season afterward, with Seagram initially having the Rochester Seagrams (later Sacramento Kings) be included there before reneging on joining the MBC due to travel concerns) being joined alongside a couple of independently ran teams in the Buffalo Bisons barnstorming team (though they previously played in the original American Basketball League and New York State Basketball League alongside independent play before joining the MBC (and by extension, the NBL afterward)) and the Whiting Ciesar All-Americans (with Ciesar in question being team owner and car dealer Eddie Ciesar) during their two seasons of play under that name.

The community working aspect of those teams in particular would prove to be a major driving point for the MBC and later NBL's success throughout their existence as a league, with small profits being a secondary factor in mind for some of these team owners when compared to the interest of the game and helping the local community within the area. The first champions of the MBC, the Chicago Duffy Florals, were considered controversial champions due to their late status as a team that joined the MBC (which had them upset more established clubs in the Firestone Non-Skids and Kautskys despite the Detroit Hed-Aids looking more like a proper team for the round-robin playoffs instead), while the second and final champions of the MBC, the Akron Goodyear Wingfoots, owned by the Goodyear Tire and Rubber Company that was also stationed in Akron, would sweep the Fort Wayne General Electrics (owned by General Electric, who primarily operated in New York, but set their team up in their Fort Wayne, Indiana area) 2–0 and became one of the inaugural teams of the MBC turned NBL alongside the Kautskys, Firestone Non-Skids, and General Electrics (among 13 total teams to start out the inaugural NBL season, most of which were originally holdovers from the MBC, with the inaugural MBC champion Chicago Duffy Florals, the Detroit Hed-Aids / Altes Lagers, and Indianapolis U.S. Tires not joining the NBL by the 1937–38 season alongside the Windsor Cooper Buses from the inaugural season; those three teams in question were soon replaced by the Oshkosh All-Stars, Kankakee Gallagher Trojans, and Richmond King Clothiers (later known as the Cincinnati Comellos after three games played into their only season of existence) by the start of the NBL's debut season) when their transition to the National Basketball League was made official. The league officially changed its name from the Midwest Basketball Conference to the National Basketball League on October 6, 1937, weeks before the start of their new season by that time, in an attempt to both attract a larger audience by becoming a more professional basketball league by comparison to their original starting point and to avoid further confusion with the Big Ten Conference, which was often referred to as the Midwest Conference.

=== General history ===
The NBL was created, in part, by three major corporations: Firestone, Goodyear, and General Electric, with Firestone's Paul Sheeks in particular being a key contributor in its creation. Alongside them, Frank Kautsky of Kautsky's Grocery was considered a major contributor to the creation of the league as well. The league was primarily made up of Great Lakes area small-market and corporate-based teams, with many of these businesses (either large or small) in question (such as Firestone, Goodyear, General Electric, Kautsky's Grocery, the Columbus Athletic Supply (again, using the same name as the team there in this specific case), Dayton Metropolitan Clothing Stores, King Clothier, HyVis (Penn) Oil, White Horse Motors, the Zollner Piston Company (later Zollner Pistons, LLC), Jim White Chevrolet of Toledo, Studebaker (via the United Auto Workers Association), Chase Brass, the Allmen Transfer & Moving Company, the American Gear & Manufacturing Company, Willys-Overland Jeep Plant (representing Jeep specifically), the American Gear Company, Duffey Meat Packing, Inc., and the Dow Chemical Company) being a key factor in deciding whether certain teams (and by extension, the league as a whole at certain points) would succeed or fail throughout most of its existence since some of these businessmen saw the NBL's profits as secondary in nature to the love of the game of basketball and/or being something that's ultimately a great thing for the communities of the places that had the sports teams in question. However, it would ultimately be the teams that would be considered independently owned and not owned by another business (meaning teams that did not put their business affiliation either as a part of or alongside their actual team name in question) that would end up having the biggest long-term survival beyond the NBL's existence, with the few teams that had relied on their business ownership in the past sacrificing it as a part of their team name(s) in order to survive as best as they could, with at least one of them still doing so to the present day.

The league began their operations in a rather informal manner. Scheduling was originally left to the discretion of each of the teams that were in the NBL, so long as the team in question played at least twelve games total, with four of them being held on the road. (Initially, each team was meant to play a total of 20 games for their inaugural season, but only one team did that in the Fort Wayne General Electrics, with one team having as low as nine total games played, meaning schedule creations for the NBL was more slapdash in nature early on in its existence.) Not only that, but there were rare occasions where forfeits were involved with official NBL games in its first few seasons (the first season saw the Akron Firestone Non-Skids be declared winners once over the Columbus Athletic Supply and the Fort Wayne General Electrics be declared winners twice (once over the Columbus Athletic Supply and once over the Indianapolis Kautskys), the second season saw the Hammond Ciesar All-Americans be declared losers to either the Warren Penns or Cleveland White Horses (date of the game in question is currently unknown to know which team Hammond was going to face off against before declaring forfeiture), and the fourth season saw both the Chicago Bruins and Toledo Jim White Chevrolets each get a victory and defeat by forfeiture). However, the number of games played in the NBL ended up increasing on a more consistent, yearly basis as the popularity of professional basketball and the NBL grew in the United States of America (especially within the Great Lakes area). Games in the NBL had consisted either of four ten-minute quarters or three fifteen-minute periods, with the choice being made by the home team (alongside whether to use the center jump after each made possession during the first season). Some of the teams were considered independently owned and operated, while others were owned by companies that also found jobs for their players after the NBL's season concluded. Two of the best teams that were owned under an independent basis were both based in Wisconsin with the Oshkosh All-Stars and Sheboygan Red Skins (both of whom would enter the NBL by December of their respective join years of 1937 and 1938) having some of the best success in the entire league, while one of the most successful business-owned team was the Fort Wayne Zollner Pistons, who first joined the NBL in 1941 despite first existing back in 1937 and were owned by Fred Zollner's locally owned and operated Zollner Piston Company.

Originally, the NBL's headquarters were located in Akron, Ohio (home of the Goodyear Wingfoots and Firestone Non-Skids franchises), with their first commissioner in question being Hubert Johnson from Detroit, Michigan, with Lon Darling, owner and general manager of the Oshkosh All-Stars, being the President of the NBL soon afterward. Following Johnson's tumultuous early tenure (which lasted until 1940), the NBL would move their headquarters to Chicago, Illinois for most of their existence going forward, with them having Chicago newspaper sports editor Leo Fischer acting as the president of the NBL from 1940 until at least 1944, though it has been reported that he stayed with the NBL under that role until at least 1946. When the NBL had a new rivaling league appear in the Basketball Association of America (BAA), the NBL implemented the return of the commissioner role with Purdue University's men's basketball head coach Ward Lambert taking on the role of the NBL's commissioner from 1946 until 1948 with Paul Walk (a new co-owner of the Indianapolis Kautskys) supposedly taking on the NBL's president role during that time as well (which angered Chicago American Gears owner Maurice White (due to him wanting to be the president of the NBL himself) to the point of leaving the NBL to creating a short-lived rivaling Professional Basketball League of America in response to their decision) and Leo Ferris (general manager of the Buffalo Bisons turned Tri-Cities Blackhawks) became the league's vice president as well. By the time the final season of the NBL commenced, the NBL decided to move their headquarters away from Chicago and into West Lafayette, Indiana in order to cut down on costs, with Sheboygan Red Skins manager/head coach Doxie Moore being the final commissioner of the league in its final season (though Chet Roan from the University of Minnesota was suggested as the only other possible option that felt more likely at first before the Lakers and three other teams jumped leagues due to Moore being viewed with disfavor in not just Sheboygan, but two other NBL places as well) and Leo Ferris of the Tri-Cities Blackhawks being the league's final president in that same season as well.

From the league's inaugural season in 1937 up until the 1941–42 season, the NBL's championship would be named the "Shaughnessy Trophy" in honor of Frank Shaughnessy, the creator of the Shaughnessy playoff system that the league used throughout their history. However, from the 1942–43 season until the league's merger with the BAA to create the NBA, the NBL's championship would be renamed into the "James Naismith Trophy" in honor of the sport's creator, Dr. James Naismith, who had lived to see the NBL's existence at the time.

In 1946, the Basketball Association of America (BAA) was incorporated as some newly founded competition, which resulted in a three-year battle with the NBL to win both players and fans along the way. The BAA played its games in larger cities and venues, which was seen as a major boom for the younger league. However, NBL tended to have the bigger stars and the community support that was seen as necessary on their ends. NBL teams also dominated the World Professional Basketball Tournament, which was an annual invitational tournament held in Chicago and sponsored by the Chicago Herald American. NBL teams won seven out of ten editions of the tournament, with the Fort Wayne Zollner Pistons being the biggest winners of the tournament during this time with three straight championships from 1944 to 1946, while the Detroit Eagles, Oshkosh All-Stars, Indianapolis Kautskys, and Minneapolis Lakers all won the event at least once each alongside three all-black teams in the New York Renaissance, the Harlem Globetrotters (who still exist to this day), and the Washington Lichtman Bears (who may or may not have had ties to the Renaissance franchise) that were independent from the NBL during this time.

On August 3, 1949, representatives from the 12-year-old NBL and 3-year-old BAA met at the BAA offices in New York's Empire State Building to help finalize a merger. Maurice Podoloff, the president of the BAA, became the president of the newly-created NBA while Ike Duffey, who was the Anderson (Duffey) Packers' team owner turned president of the NBL, became their chairman. The new National Basketball Association (NBA) was made up of 17 teams that represented both the smaller, developing towns that best represented the NBL and larger cities that had primarily represented the BAA across the country, though an 18th team in the Oshkosh All-Stars (who were slated to move elsewhere in Wisconsin, primarily Milwaukee, and potentially have a team name change) had also been slated to join the NBA initially before withdrawing from the newly-established league by September or October 1950. The NBA claims the BAA's history as its own and considers the 1949 deal as an expansion, not as a merger. For example, at NBA History online, its table of one-line "NBA Season Recaps" begins at the 1946–47 BAA season without comment. It also celebrated the "NBA at 50" anniversary in 1996, with the announcement of its 50 Greatest Players among other things occurring by that time.

Due to the implementation of the BAA-NBL merger in question, the NBA does not recognize the NBL's records and statistics outside of certain circumstances. As such, the records and statistics of the BAA and NBL prior to the merger in 1949 are considered in the official history of the NBA only if a player, coach, or team participated in the newly formed NBA after 1949 for one or more seasons.

Excluding the two seasons of play as the Midwest Basketball Conference, the history of the NBL falls into three eras, each of which contributed significantly to the growth of professional basketball and the emergence of the NBA alongside the brief MBC era. The early era of the NBL saw the dominance of teams in Akron, Ohio alongside what could be considered as the first basketball dynasty of sorts, which was centered on the Oshkosh All-Stars and their center Leroy "Cowboy" Edwards. The middle years of the NBL saw the emergence of the Fort Wayne Zollner Pistons franchise, who alongside team owner Fred Zollner, were later instrumental in the survival during the World War II period of time when it was down to only four teams at times alongside the creation of the NBA during its infancy. The final period of note during the NBL's existence centered on the late era after World War II's conclusion, which focused on George Mikan and the emergence of the big man in basketball, as well as saw the creation of a few other teams in the NBL that still exist to the NBA to this day (albeit under new names for each team).

=== Early years ===
The first season of the NBL in its more proper name saw thirteen teams competing in a two division format, with the Oshkosh All-Stars being a last-minute December entry to the league while being joined alongside the Kankakee Gallagher Trojans (who were completely amateurish in nature, to the point where no one that played there played on a notable basketball team beforehand nor joined another professional team afterward since most of them were students in Kankakee's Gallagher Trade School there) and Richmond King Clothiers (later becoming the Cincinnati Comellos on January 5, 1938 after three games played that season due to high expenses from the original Richmond owners at the time) and seeing a few MBC teams rebranding themselves (some under a more professional basis) like the Pittsburgh Y.M.H.A. team that originally focused on being a Hebrew-focused basketball team becoming the Pittsburgh Pirates to honor the MLB team of the same name while also moving out of being an exclusively Hebrew-based team to include other ethnicities and religions (though mostly white players with Christianity) in mind, the Warren HyVis Oils becoming the Warren Penns, and the Dayton London Bobbys returning to their original Dayton Metropolitans name alongside the rest of the previously surviving MBC teams with the two Akron-based teams alongside the teams in Indianapolis, Fort Wayne, Whiting, Columbus (which had their roster primarily based on the 1936–37 Otterbein College basketball roster's starting line-up), and Buffalo (the last of whom ended up returning to the now-rebranded NBL after previously leaving the MBC in its second and final season under that name).

A similar instance of a new team joining by December occurred in its second season with the Sheboygan Red Skins (who had rebranded to that name after most recently going by the Enzo Jels name at the time) joining the NBL by New Year's Eve of 1938 after previously seeing the original Buffalo Bisons squad alongside Cincinnati, Columbus, Dayton, Fort Wayne (with the General Electrics squad), and Kankakee all leaving the NBL after its first season was done (with the Warren Penns later rebranding into the Cleveland White Horses on February 10, 1939 near the end of their second season). Their next season saw the NBL get a bit more stability in mind with the Chicago Bruins (a former ABL team owned by Chicago Bears owner George Halas) replacing the Pittsburgh Pirates NBL team and the Cleveland White Horses (formerly known as the Warren Penns) rebranding themselves into the Detroit Eagles before their fourth season of operations saw them work under a one division operation with seven teams at hand with the Indianapolis Kautskys leaving the league to experiment with themselves under how they'd operate as an independent team again (the Detroit Eagles initially left also due to home arena issues, but they returned to the NBL after seeing them get their home arena issues resolved properly). For the final season representing their early years (before the U.S.A. entered World War II in December 1941), the NBL still had seven teams competing in one division, but numerous changes would be involved with the Indianapolis Kautskys returning to operations there alongside the Fort Wayne Zollner Pistons works team and Toledo Jim White Chevrolets (operating as the Toledo White Huts in non-NBL operating games) being new teams joining the NBL, while also seeing the likes of the Akron Firestone Non-Skids, Detroit Eagles, and Hammond Ciesar All-Americans leaving the league either by folding operations or by becoming a barnstorming team in the case of the Detroit Eagles.

The early history of the NBL focused primarily on two locations above all others: Akron, Ohio and Oshkosh, Wisconsin. For Akron, the city had two works teams in the Goodyear Wingfoots and Firestone Non-Skids representing some of the best teams in the NBL's first few seasons of existence. Their excellence would later be proven by both of them winning at least one championship in the NBL's first three seasons of existence, with the Goodyear Wingfoots claiming the inaugural championship in 1938 (alongside the second and final MBC championship in 1937) and the Firestone Non-Skids winning the next two years after their inaugural NBL championship victory with back-to-back wins in 1939 and 1940. The small city of Oshkosh had the Oshkosh All-Stars, who entered the NBL as an independent franchise following an independent championship win over the New York Renaissance and not long afterward appeared in the NBL's championship series for five consecutive years (1938–42). They ended up winning only two titles during that time (which were the final years of that stretch in 1941 and 1942), with the All-Stars franchise being led by a rugged 6'4" (1.93 m) center named Leroy "Cowboy" Edwards back in a time when players over that height were very rare. Edwards was a consensus NCAA "All American" and Helms Foundation "College Player of the Year" as a member of the 1934–35 University of Kentucky Wildcats. He left Kentucky after two years to pursue a professional basketball career, which was unheard of at the time. He led the NBL in scoring for three consecutive seasons, which happened in the NBL's first three seasons of play. He set numerous NBL and professional basketball scoring records and is generally credited with the introduction of the "3 second rule" in basketball, which is still in existence today. Edwards played in all 12 NBL seasons with the Oshkosh All-Stars (with Edwards being joined by fellow championship teammate Charley Shipp as the only players to play in the NBL for all twelve seasons of its existence), and retired from professional play just prior to the NBL's merger with the BAA to form the NBA.

=== Middle years ===
Once the NBL concluded their 1941–42 season, more Americans were called up to action to serve the U.S. Army and U.S. Navy, which helped lead to a significant drop off of available teams competing in the NBL from seven to five teams to start the 1942–43 season with the Akron Goodyear Wingfoots and Indianapolis Kautskys both suspending operations due to World War II and the Chicago Bruins' spot being bought out by a new team operated by Studebaker (and paid for by the United Auto Workers Association) called the Chicago Studebaker Flyers (sometimes shortened out to the Chicago Studebakers) for this season (though it's slated by some that the Bruins and Studebaker Flyers are actually the same franchise, just operated by different people), before ending the season with four total teams due to the Toledo Jim White Chevrolets folding operations on December 14, 1942 due to poor operations as a team while struggling to compete under wartime conditions (with the 1943 World Professional Basketball Tournament later showcasing only three NBL teams left by then due to the Studebaker Flyers folding both due to inconsistent home location play and a misunderstanding regarding an argument involving a black player and a while player during a practice of theirs confusing racial tension with general annoyance during a team practice). The following season after that saw them compete with four teams once again (this time for a full season), only instead of the Chicago Studebaker Flyers, a works team was placed in Cleveland that was operated by the Chase Brass and Copper Company called the Cleveland Chase Brassmen as the newest fourth team there alongside the All-Stars, Red Skins, and Zollner Pistons.

Near the end of the wartime period, the NBL would see itself safely expand their operations back into a two division system again, but with six teams involved with the Pittsburgh Raiders returning to the league under a new name and the Chicago American Gears joining up alongside them, with the Chase Brassmen being renamed to the Cleveland Allmen Transfers as well due to the Allmen Transfer & Moving Company acquiring the Cleveland squad from the Chase Brass and Copper Company. It's also during this time that NBL players would become taller than what they first started out to be, to the point where they had to implement the goaltending rule to deter defensive centers from getting long blocks in their league. In what later became their NBL's final season of play while operating under wartime conditions, the NBL would expand itself even further with eight teams again with the Indianapolis Kautskys returning to play again in exchange for the Pittsburgh Raiders, as well as the Rochester Royals (formerly operating as an independent team named the Rochester Seagrams, the Rochester Eber Seagrams, and Rochester Pros) and Youngstown Bears (taking over operations for the Pittsburgh Raiders officially) being new additions to the league for the 1945–46 season that saw World War II come to a close.

The Fort Wayne Zollner Pistons—nicknamed so because they were owned by Fred Zollner, whose company made pistons for engines—were led by tough veteran Bobby McDermott, who was a known outlier of many of the NBL's players by this time for being what was considered to be a sharpshooter (for the standards of 1930s and 1940s era basketball) while playing as a guard despite him being a high school dropout when he entered the NBL (leaving Flushing High School in New York after only a year of attendance there to play basketball alongside doing work on his end). The Pistons finished second in 1942 and 1943 before winning the league title in 1944 and 1945. Like many teams of that era, it was not uncommon for Fort Wayne to play its games in taverns, armories, junior high or high school gyms, or even ballrooms.

Under Zollner, the Pistons franchise would eventually play an important role in the survival and growth of the NBL, as well as its successor in the NBA. Zollner's financial support of the NBL helped the league stay afloat during World War II. At times, Zollner and his Pistons were considered the only team that made a profit in the league, meaning he would have to be willing to share out his revenue sources with the rest of the teams during the times where the league went down to as few as four teams just to make sure the rest of the league survived to play for another season while the war commenced. Meanwhile, his cooperative nature as a businessman would help lead to the creation of the NBA, as well as make sure that league stayed afloat during its most challenging years in its early history as well.

Challenging the Zollner Pistons and Oshkosh for supremacy were the Sheboygan Red Skins. Beginning in 1941, the season before Fort Wayne joined the NBL, Sheboygan appeared in five out of six championship series match-ups in the NBL. They lost to Oshkosh in the 1941 NBL Finals, but beat Fort Wayne for the title in 1943 despite barely having an above-average record that year before losing to the Zollner Pistons in 1944 and 1945 and then being swept in the 1946 NBL Finals by one of the league's newest members, the powerhouse Rochester Royals, who boasted Hall of Famers Al Cervi, Bob Davies and Red Holzman.

=== Later years ===
Entering the post–World War II era years properly, the NBL would enter their first post-war season with the most teams in the league since its first season under the NBL name with twelve teams competing in the Eastern and Western Division, with the Syracuse Nationals buying out the spot that was originally held by the Cleveland Allmen Transfers and the Anderson Duffey Packers, the newest rendition of the Buffalo Bisons (later moving during the season to become the Tri-Cities Blackhawks by Christmas 1946), Detroit Gems, and Toledo Jeeps all joining the NBL's first season when they began their rivalry with the new, upstart Basketball Association of America (with the Pittsburgh Raiders being considered for a potential return alongside teams of interest in cities like Milwaukee, St. Louis, Minneapolis, and Dayton, Ohio). During this period of time the NBL started to implement some improvements to their overall structure (such as financing, scheduling of exhibition and regular season games, and full-time officiating) and new features that would currently exist in modern-day basketball leagues like the National Basketball Association, such as a drafting system (though no known record for the NBL's drafts have been officially kept, at least as of 2025) and a free agency system of sorts. In their second season under that era (which later turned out to be its penultimate season of existence), the NBL would see the defending champion Chicago American Gears leave the league to create an ambitious, yet ultimately short-lived rivaling professional basketball league of their own called the Professional Basketball League of America and the Youngstown Bears leave the NBL altogether, though they would also see the Detroit Gems rebrand themselves into the Minneapolis Lakers following the wretched season they had under their original name (though recent Lakers history tends to omit their history as the Detroit Gems in the NBL) and even see one last works team be added to the league in the Flint Dow A.C.'s (formerly known as the Midland Dow Chemicals before joining the NBL and later changed their team name to the Midland Dow A.C.'s at some point in the season, to the point where they sometimes get misconstrued into being named the Flint/Midland Dow A.C.'s instead) with the Dow Chemical Company's involvement at hand (The Los Angeles Red Devils, who were an integrated franchise that famously featured Jackie Robinson as a player, were also considered for expansion, though they were ultimately denied in part due to them being very far away from everyone else in Los Angeles, California.)

Following the start of what was to be their final season of operations, the NBL would see four of their teams in Fort Wayne, Indianapolis, Minneapolis, and Rochester jump ship from the NBL to the BAA, with two more attempts from Toledo and Oshkosh failing to join up with them in the process. As a result of the sudden switch-up from those four teams, the NBL had to operate in their final season of play with nine total teams at hand with the Toledo Jeeps and the Dow works team that operated in the state of Michigan folding operations and the original Denver Nuggets team that first started out in the Amateur Athletic Union (who also were the only non-Great Lakes area team to join the NBL due to them operating in Denver, Colorado), the Hammond Calumet Buccaneers, the Waterloo Hawks, and the Detroit Vagabond Kings (who folded operations after only winning two games on December 17, 1948 and were replaced by the Dayton Rens, an all-black team that would be considered the first professionally integrated team in a formerly all-white league since they previously operated as the New York Renaissance before that point in time, yet inherited the record that the Detroit Vagabond Kings held that season in the process) being the final new teams to join the NBL in its final season of play (though the NBL also considered teams coming back to Chicago and Dayton once again, as well as new teams going to Des Moines, Louisville, St. Paul, and Wilkes-Barre). One more team was planned to be created for the league in what was to be its 1949–1950 season in the Indianapolis Olympians as a hard replacement to the old Indianapolis Kautskys NBL (later Indianapolis Jets BAA) franchise, but before they could begin such a plan, the NBL would merge with the BAA to create the modern-day National Basketball Association, with most of the teams from the NBL's final season of play alongside the Olympians joining the newly formed league.

The NBL's third and final era was dominated by George Mikan, the 6'10" (2.08 m), three-time NCAA "All-American" center from DePaul University in Chicago. As a rookie, he led the Chicago American Gears to the 1947 NBL championship, but before the next season officially began, owner Maurice White pulled his team out of the league and formed his own ambitious 24-team circuit (though it ultimately was cut down to 16 teams before it officially began) called the Professional Basketball League of America. That venture quickly failed, and the American Gears were shut out on returning to the NBL, but the former American Gears players were allowed to return to the NBL in a dispersal draft of sorts, with Mikan being signed up by the NBL's Minneapolis Lakers (who actually retained the original history of the previous Detroit Gems franchise despite their wretched 4–40 record the previous season), where he teamed with the versatile Jim Pollard to win the 1948 NBL championship. It's also during this period of time where the structure of both the NBL (including its operating structure and schedule making) and the teams that would later survive ended up taking form into something akin to the newly created and rivaling Basketball Association of America, as alongside the creation of the Minneapolis Lakers from the prior Detroit Gems, the 1946–47 season also saw the creation of some key teams that would eventually play a part in the NBL's future merger with the Syracuse Nationals, the second rendition of the Buffalo Bisons (who became the Tri-Cities Blackhawks by Christmas 1946), and the Anderson Duffey Packers, who were all joined alongside the Toledo Jeeps.

After the 1947–48 season concluded, Mikan's Lakers quit the NBL to join the newly rivaling Basketball Association of America (BAA), along with three other NBL clubs: the Rochester Royals, Fort Wayne Zollner Pistons (removing the Zollner branding from the team entering the BAA since that league doesn't allow for sponsorships as team names), and Indianapolis Kautskys (renamed to the Indianapolis Jets due to the no sponsorships as team names rule in the BAA). Originally, the Lakers felt content with staying in the NBL at first, but when the Zollner Pistons and Kautskys franchises left the NBL to join the BAA, the Lakers ended up reconsidering the notion of joining the BAA in the end, with the Rochester Royals being added into the mix later on. Two other NBL teams in the Oshkosh All-Stars and Toledo Jeeps also tried to apply for entry into the BAA alongside these four teams, but both Oshkosh and Toledo ended up being rejected by the BAA instead of approved by them (with their rejections also being joined alongside the creation of the planned BAA Buffalo team that never got created and failed BAA expansion teams in Louisville, Kentucky and Wilkes-Barre, Pennsylvania), which later led to the Jeeps franchise folding operations entirely.

The NBL would end up creating a few more new teams to take the spots left behind by the four teams that jumped leagues, with a couple of them in the original Denver Nuggets (formerly of the Amateur Athletic Union) and the Waterloo Hawks later contributing to the NBA's history. Not only that, but they added an all-black team in December 1948 during its final season, when one of its replacement clubs, the Detroit Vagabond Kings, folded. That franchise was awarded to a famous barnstorming team, the New York Rens, who were composed entirely of African-Americans, to play out the rest of their season in Dayton, Ohio, as the Dayton Rens. On August 3, 1949, after a three-year battle with the Basketball Association of America (BAA) for fans and players alike, the NBL merged with the BAA and became the National Basketball Association. The merger in question saw six of the NBL's remaining nine teams of play (the Anderson (Duffey) Packers, the original Denver Nuggets, the Sheboygan Red Skins, the Syracuse Nationals, the Tri-Cities Blackhawks, and the Waterloo Hawks) alongside a planned NBL expansion team in the Indianapolis Olympians joining the BAA's ten surviving teams to create a new seventeen team league, with the NBL's cuts featuring the all-black Dayton Rens due to racial segregation purposes, the Hammond Calumet Buccaneers due to them being especially poor as a franchise and being primarily in close proximity to the Chicago Stags BAA-turned-NBA franchise, and most surprisingly of all, the Oshkosh All-Stars. Originally, the Oshkosh franchise was considered to be a part of the BAA-NBL merger that became the NBA as the eighth NBL team joining the league there (though they would have had to move to Milwaukee or Green Bay in order to officially play in the NBA, with Milwaukee being the most likely option of the two locations), but they ultimately dropped out of the NBA by September or October 1949 due to ownership having doubts on their personal success in the newly-established league and being involved with a new location like that, which later led to them folding operations entirely due to Lon Darling dying from a heart attack in 1951. A few years after the merger, the NBA adopted the BAA's history as its own history moving forward there, with the NBL's history being considered more of an afterthought outside of a select few moments in mind.

== Legacy ==
The NBL contributed significantly to the foundation of the NBA, but it also had major accomplishments in other areas, most notably in offering opportunities for African-American players. The first known instance of an African-American player being involved with the league was back in the MBC days when Hank Williams of the Buffalo Bisons (formerly a star of the Buffalo Colored Giants) became the first player to join an established professional league since the early 1900s occurred with both the New York State League and New England League. In the 1942–43 season, with many players serving in the U.S. Armed Forces due to World War II, two NBL clubs, the Toledo Jim White Chevrolets and the Chicago Studebaker Flyers, filled their rosters by signing up African-American players—five years before Jackie Robinson would break baseball's color barrier with the Brooklyn Dodgers. Neither team ended up faring well in the process, however. Toledo signed several black players to start the season, including Bill Jones, who had starred at the University of Toledo, but the team lost its first four games and folded operations early in its season due to financial difficulties on Jim White's end as the team owner. Meanwhile, Chicago stocked its roster with several members of the Harlem Globetrotters, who worked during the week at the Studebaker plant and received their payments from the United Auto Workers Association, but that franchise also folded operations after compiling an 8–15 record and being eliminated by the Fort Wayne Zollner Pistons in the 1943 NBL playoffs. Other teams in later years would end up signing African-Americans for their rosters, with some of them being key members for success for good measure. By the end of the NBL's existence, during its final season of play, the league would allow for an all-black team to participate in its league amongst teams that were mostly all-white themselves with the Dayton Rens (previously known as the New York Rens) taking on a spot in the league in the middle of their final season of play.

Five current National Basketball Association (NBA) teams trace their history back to the NBL. Three teams joined the BAA in 1948: the Minneapolis Lakers (formerly the Detroit Gems and now the Los Angeles Lakers), the Rochester Royals (now the Sacramento Kings), and the Fort Wayne Zollner Pistons (now the Detroit Pistons). Two more teams were part of the merger that created the NBA in 1949: the Buffalo Bisons/Tri-Cities Blackhawks (now the Atlanta Hawks), and the Syracuse Nationals (now the Philadelphia 76ers).

Five former NBA teams also trace their history back to the NBL: the Anderson Packers (known as the Anderson Duffey Packers in the NBL), Denver Nuggets (who bear no relation to the current Denver Nuggets team with the same name), Indianapolis Jets (formerly known as the Indianapolis Kautskys), Sheboygan Red Skins and Waterloo Hawks played in the NBL/BAA/NBA. The Jets played in the BAA for the 1948–49 BAA season only, essentially being the only early NBL-to-BAA transfer that didn't survive the move there; the remaining teams in question all played for the 1949–50 NBA season only. Anderson, Denver (deciding to rebrand themselves as the Denver Frontier Refiners by this time), Sheboygan, and Waterloo joined the National Professional Basketball League that they helped create in the 1950–51 season, though that season would end prematurely with every team there folding operations not long afterward if they had not done so already during the season.

The NBL also created the Indianapolis Olympians franchise for what would have been the 1949–50 NBL season after the Indianapolis Jets franchise folded operations. When the NBL and BAA merged, this team joined the NBA without playing a single NBL game. The Olympians franchise would exist for four seasons in the NBA, being considered a playoff team in each season of play there, but ultimately folded operations in 1953 following the aftermath of the 1951 college basketball point-shaving scandal revealing in Olympians players Ralph Beard and Alex Groza being involved in that scandal back in their days of playing in the University of Kentucky, which subsequently led to Beard and Groza being forced to sell their shares on the team that they had at the time at a significant loss.

Also still surviving to the present day are the Akron Goodyear Wingfoots, the league's last champions under the MBC name in 1937 and their first champions under the NBL name in 1938. The Wingfoots suspended operations for World War II and were not included in the NBL/BAA merger years afterward since they never decided to return to the NBL after the war ended. Instead, they decided to enter into the National Industrial Basketball League (NIBL) alongside the Fort Wayne General Electrics (though the General Electrics would only play for one season there due to them being winless that season), which in 1961 became the National AAU Basketball League (NABL). The Wingfoots are still an AAU Elite team in the present day for the NABL.

== Teams ==
^	Denotes a franchise that is currently active, present day NBA

Note: The years 1940–1944 would operate with the NBL being played with no divisions at hand. As such, any division labeling for those seasons would be based on presumptions relating to the general area that the team(s) in question would fit in more by comparison.

Eastern Division
Team	City	Arena	Capacity	Founded	Predecessor team	NBL Years	Successor team
Akron Firestone Non-Skids	Akron, Ohio	Firestone Clubhouse	1,500	1932	Akron Firestone Non-Skids (NPBL/MBC)	1937–1941	—N/a
Akron Goodyear Wingfoots	Akron, Ohio	Akron Goodyear Hall	5,000	1918	Akron Goodyear Wingfoots (AAU/NIL/NPBL/MBC)	1937–1942	Akron Goodyear Wingfoots (NIBL/NABL/AAU)
Buffalo Bisons	Buffalo, New York	Broadway Auditorium	7,500	1925	Buffalo Bisons (ABL/NYSBL/MBC)	1937–1938	—N/a
Columbus Athletic Supply	Columbus, Ohio	Ohio State Fairgrounds Arena (Taft Coliseum)	5,003(?)	1936	Columbus Athletic Supply (MBC)	1937–1938	—N/a
Dayton Metropolitans	Dayton, Ohio	Montgomery County Fairgrounds Coliseum	4,200	1935	Dayton Metropolitans / London Bobbys (MBC)	1937–1938	—N/a
Pittsburgh Pirates	Pittsburgh, Pennsylvania	Duquesne U Gym	5,000	1931	Pittsburgh Y.M.H.A. (MBC)	1937–1939	Pittsburgh Raiders (NBL)
Warren Penns	Warren, Pennsylvania	Beaty Jr. High Gym	900	1926	Warren HyVis Oilers / Warren HyVis Oils (MBC)	1937–1938	Cleveland White Horses (NBL)
Cleveland White Horses	Cleveland, Ohio	Cleveland Arena	6,000	1926/1938	Warren Penns (NBL)	1938–1939	Detroit Eagles (NBL)
Detroit Eagles	Detroit, Michigan	Detroit Naval Armory	3,000	1926/1939	Cleveland White Horses (NBL)	1939–1941	—N/a
Toledo White Huts/Jim White Chevrolets	Toledo, Ohio	Toledo Civic Auditorium	3,600	1941	—N/a / Toledo White Huts (WPBT)	1941–1943	Toledo Jim White Chevrolets (NBL) / Toledo White Huts
Cleveland Chase Brassmen/Allmen Transfers	Cleveland, Ohio	Cleveland Auditorium	10,000	1935(?)	Cleveland Chase Copper Brass (AAU) / Cleveland Chase Brassmen (NBL)	1943–1946	Cleveland Allmen Transfers (NBL) / N/A
Pittsburgh Raiders	Pittsburgh, Pennsylvania	Duquesne Gardens	5,000	1943	Pittsburgh Pirates (NBL)	1944–1945	—N/a
Youngstown Bears	Youngstown, Ohio	Youngstown South Field House	3,500	1945	—N/a	1945–1947	—N/a
Rochester Royals^	Rochester, New York	Edgerton Park Arena	4,500	1923	Rochester Seagrams / Eber Seagrams / Pros	1945–1948	Rochester Royals (now Sacramento Kings) (BAA/NBA)
Buffalo Bisons/Tri-Cities Blackhawks^	Buffalo, New York / Moline, Illinois	Buffalo Memorial Auditorium / Wharton Field House	14,000; 6,000	1946	—N/a / Buffalo Bisons (NBL)	1946–1949	Tri-Cities Blackhawks (now Atlanta Hawks) (NBA)
Toledo Jeeps	Toledo, Ohio	The Field House (University of Toledo)	6,000	1946	Toledo Whites (WPBT)	1946–1948	—N/a
Syracuse Nationals^	Syracuse, New York	State Fair Coliseum	7,500	1946	—N/a	1946–1949	Syracuse Nationals (now Philadelphia 76ers) (NBA)
Detroit Vagabond Kings	Detroit, Michigan	Holy Redeemer High School Gymnasium / Dearborn High School Gymnasium	300; 1,000	1948	—N/a	1948–1949	—N/a
Dayton Rens	Dayton, Ohio	Springfield High School Gymnasium	1,200	1923	New York Renaissance (WPBT)	1948–1949	New York Renaissance

Western Division
Team	City	Arena	Capacity	Founded	Predecessor team	NBL Years	Successor team
Oshkosh All-Stars	Oshkosh, Wisconsin	South Park School Gymnasium	2,000	1929	Oshkosh All-Stars	1937–1949	Oshkosh All-Stars (WSBL)
Fort Wayne General Electrics	Fort Wayne, Indiana	North Side High School Gym	3,000	1935	Fort Wayne General Electrics (MBC)	1937–1938	Fort Wayne General Electrics (NIBL)
Indianapolis Kautskys	Indianapolis, Indiana	Hinkle Fieldhouse	15,000	1931	Indianapolis Kautskys (NPBL/MBC/NBL); Indianapolis Pure Oils / Oilers (WPBT)	1937–1940; 1941–1942; 1945–1948	Indianapolis Jets (BAA)
Whiting / Hammond Ciesar All-Americans	Whiting / Hammond, Indiana	Whiting Community Building / Hammond Civic Center	? / 6,000	1936	Whiting Ciesar All-Americans (MBC)	1937–1941	—N/a
Kankakee Gallagher Trojans	Kankakee, Illinois	Kankakee National Guard Armory	750	1937	—N/a	1937–1938	—N/a
Richmond King Clothiers	Richmond, Indiana	Richmond Civic Auditorium	?	1937	—N/a	1937–1938	Cincinnati Comellos (NBL)
Cincinnati Comellos	Cincinnati, Ohio	Freeman Avenue Armory Gym	?	1937/8	Richmond King Clothiers (NBL)	1937–1938	—N/a
Sheboygan Red Skins	Sheboygan, Wisconsin	Eagles Auditorium / Sheboygan Municipal Auditorium and Armory	1,500 / 3,000	1933	The Ballhorns / Art Imigs / Enzo Jels	1938–1949	Sheboygan Red Skins (NBA/NPBL)
Chicago Bruins	Chicago, Illinois	Chicago Coliseum	6,000	1925	Chicago Bruins (ABL)/Chicago Harmons (WPBT)	1939–1942	—N/a
Fort Wayne Zollner Pistons^	Fort Wayne, Indiana	North Side High School Gym	3,000	1937	Fort Wayne Zollner Pistons (WPBT)	1941–1948	Fort Wayne Pistons (now Detroit Pistons) (BAA/NBA)
Chicago Studebaker Flyers	Chicago, Illinois	Chicago Coliseum	6,000	1942	—N/a	1942–1943	South Bend Studebaker Champions (WPBT)
Chicago American Gears	Chicago, Illinois	International Amphitheatre	9,000	1944	Chicago American Gears (AAU)	1944–1947	Chicago American Gears (PBLA)
Anderson Duffey Packers	Anderson, Indiana	Anderson High School Wigwam	4,800	1945	Anderson Chiefs / Chief Anderson Meat Packers (WPBT)	1946–1949	Anderson Packers (NBA/NPBL)
Detroit Gems	Detroit, Michigan	Lincoln High School Gymnasium (Ferndale) / Holy Redeemer High School Gymnasium / Detroit Olympia (doubleheaders only)	1,500 / 600 / 14,000	1946	—N/a	1946–1947	Minneapolis Lakers (NBL)
Minneapolis Lakers^	Minneapolis, Minnesota	Minneapolis Auditorium	10,000	1947	Detroit Gems (NBL)	1947–1948	Minneapolis Lakers (now Los Angeles Lakers) (BAA/NBA)
Flint/Midland Dow A.C.'s	Flint / Midland, Michigan	Flint Industrial Mutual Association Auditorium / Midland High School Gym	6,000 / ?	1942	Midland Dow Chemicals (WPBT)	1947–1948	—N/a
Hammond Calumet Buccaneers	Hammond, Indiana	Hammond Civic Center	6,000	1948	—N/a	1948–1949	—N/a
Waterloo Hawks	Waterloo, Iowa	McElroy Auditorium	5,155	1948	—N/a	1948–1949	Waterloo Hawks (NBA/NPBL)
Denver Nuggets	Denver, Colorado	Denver Auditorium Arena	6,841	1932/1948	Denver Nuggets (AAU)	1948–1949	Denver Nuggets (NBA(/AAU?)) (later Denver Frontier Refiners / Evansville Agogans (NPBL))

== Seasons ==
- 1935–36 Midwest Basketball Conference season
- 1936–37 Midwest Basketball Conference season
- 1937–38 National Basketball League (United States) season
- 1938–39 National Basketball League (United States) season
- 1939–40 National Basketball League (United States) season
- 1940–41 National Basketball League (United States) season
- 1941–42 National Basketball League (United States) season
- 1942–43 National Basketball League (United States) season
- 1943–44 National Basketball League (United States) season
- 1944–45 National Basketball League (United States) season
- 1945–46 National Basketball League (United States) season
- 1946–47 National Basketball League (United States) season
- 1947–48 National Basketball League (United States) season
- 1948–49 National Basketball League (United States) season

== Season leaders, awards, and championships ==
- NBL yearly standings
- List of NBL champions
- List of NBL scoring leaders
- NBL (United States) Most Valuable Player Award
- All-National Basketball League (United States) Team
- NBL (United States) Rookie of the Year Award
- NBL (United States) Coach of the Year Award
