= 1938–39 Sheboygan Red Skins season =

NBL professional basketball team season

- Head coach: Edwin Schutte
- Arena: Eagles Auditorium

Results
- Record: 11–17 (.393)
- Place: Division: 3rd (Western)
- Playoff finish: Did not qualify Lost WPBT third place match 36–33 to the Harlem Globetrotters

The 1938–39 Sheboygan Red Skins season was the Red Skins' first year in the United States' National Basketball League (NBL), which would also be the second year the NBL itself existed after previously existing as either an amateur or semipro-based league called the Midwest Basketball Conference in its first two seasons of existence. However, if one were to include their few seasons they played as an independent team under a few various team names involving local businesses like the The Ballhorns (being sponsored by a local florist and funeral parlor), the Art Imigs (being sponsored by a local dry cleaning shop owned and operated by a man named Art Imig with team jerseys saying Art Imig's), and the Enzo Jels (being sponsored by a local gelatin manufacturer known as Enzo-Pac) at various points starting back in 1933 before becoming the Sheboygan Red Skins due to their promotion up into the NBL, this would officially be their sixth overall season of play as well. Unlike the first (and previous) season that the NBL officially existed under the name it would use for the rest of its existence as a professional basketball league where either three or four new teams would join the NBL following its rebranding from the MBC (depending on whether you count the rebranding of the Richmond King Clothiers to the Cincinnati Comellos as two new teams or not), the Sheboygan Red Skins would be the only new team to join the NBL in its second season of existence under that name after five other teams (including two of the newer NBL teams in the Cincinnati Comellos and Kankakee Gallagher Trojans) would drop out of the league entirely, though Sheboygan's introduction into the NBL would be a rather late one, as similar to their stateside rivals in the Oshkosh All-Stars, the Red Skins franchise would enter the NBL by December 1938 after the NBL's season began back in November, with Sheboygan entering the league on New Year's Eve of 1938. Despite the awkward timing of Sheboygan's inclusion into the NBL, the entire league would end up adjusting their schedules (including retroactively making some of the games prior NBL teams had played against the Red Skins official NBL games entering 1939) to allow for a relatively equal-looking number of games played for the rest of the league, including the Red Skins, with Sheboygan joining the now-eight team league going forward and the Red Skins entering the now-four team Western Division alongside the previously established four team Eastern Division.

When the NBL retroactively added the Sheboygan Red Skins into the NBL by the end of 1938, they would already end up having an above-average 7–5 record after playing with nearly every single team in games that were originally considered exhibition games with NBL teams at the time before they later got upgraded into official NBL scheduled games for this season. When the Red Skins played their first officially scheduled game by the NBL's own terms properly on January 2, 1939, on the road against the Indianapolis Kautskys, they would end up losing to the Kautskys with a 52–38 defeat, with their first home match two days later (which was held at the Eagles Auditorium.) ending with a 42–37 win over the Hammond Ciesar All-Americans. Sheboygan would later not win again in the NBL until near the end of the month on January 29 against Hammond, with them only winning two more times throughout the rest of the year in February (as well as hosting the last game played by the Warren Penns under that name alongside the penultimate game for the Cleveland White Horses under that name before they moved to Detroit the following season to become the Detroit Eagles for the rest of their existence) to end their first NBL season with a below-average 11–17 record. This record would result in them not qualifying for the NBL Playoffs for their first season in the league. Of course, even if they had finished in second place instead of automatically failed to qualify for the NBL Playoffs by finishing in third place this season, this season had the unique mold of having the NBL Playoffs only being the championship round involving the best teams of each division (which were the cityside rivaling Oshkosh All-Stars in the Western Division and the eventual champions in the Akron Firestone Non-Skids in the Eastern Division) competing against each other in a best-of-five series instead of a proper playoff formatting like other NBL seasons would have.

In addition to joining the NBL this season, the Sheboygan Red Skins would also join their cityside rivals in the Oshkosh All-Stars as the only two NBL teams to participate in the inaugural 1939 World Professional Basketball Tournament. Due to the odd number of teams participating in this particular version of the WPBT, there would not only be three different byes in the first round of the tournament, but also a bonus bye given out to one team in the quarterfinal round for just this specific event as well. With that being said, Sheboygan would not get those byes this time around (with the Oshkosh All-Stars actually being the team given the quarterfinal round bye out of all possible teams), meaning they would have to compete like most other teams participating in this event. While they would defeat the Illinois Grads replacement team that took over for the ABL's Philadelphia Sphas and the rivaling American Basketball League's Troy Celtics in the first two rounds of the event, the Red Skins could not get past the Oshkosh All-Stars in the semifinal round, with their third place consolation prize round loss to the world famous (all-black) Harlem Globetrotters ultimately showcasing what would become their best showcasing throughout their history in the WPBT throughout the ten years the World Professional Basketball Tournament existed. They would also see Ed Dancker get named into the inaugural All-Tournament Team after previously not having awards or honors being given out by the NBL whatsoever this season.

== Roster ==
1938–39 Sheboygan Red Skins roster
Players

Pos.	No.	Player	Height	Weight	DOB	From
G/F		Sparky Adams	6 ft 1 in (1.85 m)	185 lb (84 kg)	1917–04–04	Marquette
G		Kieran Crowley	5 ft 8 in (1.73 m)	155 lb (70 kg)	1916–06–07	DePaul
C		Ed Dancker	6 ft 7 in (2.01 m)	200 lb (91 kg)	1914–03–14	South Division HS (WI)
F/C		Erwin Graf	6 ft 3 in (1.91 m)	200 lb (91 kg)	1917–07–28	Marquette
G		Walter Grauman	6 ft 2 in (1.88 m)	200 lb (91 kg)	1915–06–17	Sheboygan HS (WI)
G		Eddie Kolar	5 ft 10 in (1.78 m)	170 lb (77 kg)	1909–04–30	J. Sterling Morton HS (IL)
G/F		Otto Kolar	6 ft 3 in (1.91 m)	180 lb (82 kg)	1911–12–06	J. Sterling Morton HS (IL)
F		Les Kuplic	6 ft 3 in (1.91 m)	200 lb (91 kg)	1911–09–23	Beloit
G/F		Rube Lautenschlager	6 ft 2 in (1.88 m)	190 lb (86 kg)	1915–09–07	UW–Oshkosh
F/C		Slim Lonsdorf	6 ft 4 in (1.93 m)	175 lb (79 kg)	1905–03–22	Marquette
G		Johnny Posewitz	6 ft 0 in (1.83 m)	185 lb (84 kg)	1906–08–09	Sheboygan HS (WI)?
G		Scoop Posewitz	5 ft 11 in (1.80 m)	180 lb (82 kg)	1908–09–12	Sheboygan HS (WI)?
G		Dave Quabius	5 ft 11 in (1.80 m)	185 lb (84 kg)	1916–03–16	Marquette
G/F		Carl Roth	6 ft 2 in (1.88 m)	200 lb (91 kg)	1909–09–15	Wisconsin
F/C		Pres Slack	6 ft 2 in (1.88 m)	180 lb (82 kg)	1908–12–28	Central HS (IN)
F		Paul Sokody	6 ft 2 in (1.88 m)	170 lb (77 kg)	1914–08–18	Marquette
G		Ken Suesens	6 ft 1 in (1.85 m)	175 lb (79 kg)	1916–10–23	Iowa
F/C		Stan Zadel	6 ft 5 in (1.96 m)	215 lb (98 kg)	1916–04–08	DePaul

Coaches
Head coach
- Edwin Schutte

Legend
- (DP) Unsigned draft pick
- (FA) Free agent
- (S) Suspended
- Injured

Roster

== Regular season ==
=== Season standings ===
Pos.	Western Division	Wins	Losses	Win %
1	Oshkosh All-Stars	17	11	.607
2	Indianapolis Kautskys	13	13	.500
3	Sheboygan Red Skins	11	17	.393
4	Hammond Ciesar All-Americans	4	24	.143

=== NBL Schedule ===
Officially speaking, the Sheboygan Red Skins did not join the NBL until New Year's Eve of 1938, meaning that the official listing of these games for this schedule during the year 1938 are primarily included on a retroactive basis for both Sheboygan and the teams they played against during this period of time (which essentially was the rest of the NBL outside of the Oshkosh All-Stars, who were nearby the Sheboygan franchise).

- November 23, 1938 @ Sheboygan, WI: Akron Firestone Non-Skids 36, Sheboygan Red Skins 33
- November 27, 1938 @ Sheboygan, WI: Pittsburgh Pirates 28, Sheboygan Red Skins 45
- December 4, 1938 @ Sheboygan, WI: Warren Penns 34, Sheboygan Red Skins 46
- December 7, 1938 @ Sheboygan, WI: Akron Goodyear Wingfoots 32, Sheboygan Red Skins 30
- December 11, 1938 @ Hammond, IN: Sheboygan Red Skins 35, Hammond Ciesar All-Americans 30
- December 14, 1938 @ Sheboygan, WI: Hammond Ciesar All-Americans 30, Sheboygan Red Skins 36
- December 18, 1938 @ Akron, OH: Sheboygan Red Skins 35, Akron Firestone Non-Skids 37
- December 20, 1938 @ Akron, OH: Sheboygan Red Skins 33, Akron Goodyear Wingfoots 40
- December 21, 1938 @ Pittsburgh, PA: Sheboygan Red Skins 32, Pittsburgh Pirates 49
- December 22, 1938 @ Warren, PA: Sheboygan Red Skins 26, Warren Penns 24
- December 25, 1938 @ Sheboygan, WI: Pittsburgh Pirates 38, Sheboygan Red Skins 43
- December 28, 1938 @ Sheboygan, WI: Indianapolis Kautskys 42, Sheboygan Red Skins 45
- January 2, 1939 @ Indianapolis, IN: Sheboygan Red Skins 38, Indianapolis Kautskys 52
- January 4, 1939 @ Sheboygan, WI: Hammond Ciesar All-Americans 37, Sheboygan Red Skins 42
- January 9, 1939 @ Milwaukee, WI: Sheboygan Red Skins 33, Oshkosh All-Stars 38
- January 11, 1939 @ Sheboygan, WI: Akron Firestone Non-Skids 51, Sheboygan Red Skins 35
- January 16, 1939 @ Crawfordsville, IN: Sheboygan Red Skins 34, Indianapolis Kautskys 41
- January 18, 1939 @ Sheboygan, WI: Oshkosh All-Stars 44, Sheboygan Red Skins 40
- January 29, 1939 @ Hammond, IN: Sheboygan Red Skins 29, Hammond Ciesar All-Americans 27
- February 1, 1939 @ Sheboygan, WI: Akron Goodyear Wingfoots 39, Sheboygan Red Skins 36
- February 5, 1939 @ Akron, OH: Sheboygan Red Skins 26, Akron Firestone Non-Skids 42
- February 7, 1939 @ Akron, OH: Sheboygan Red Skins 19, Akron Goodyear Wingfoots 21
- February 8, 1939: Sheboygan Red Skins 39, Pittsburgh Pirates 37 (OT @ Pittsburgh, Pennsylvania)
- February 9, 1939 @ Cleveland, Ohio: Sheboygan Red Skins 33, Warren Penns 37
- February 15, 1939 @ Sheboygan, WI: Oshkosh All-Stars 28, Sheboygan Red Skins 25
- February 23, 1939 @ Oshkosh, WI: Sheboygan Red Skins 39, Oshkosh All-Stars 47
- February 25, 1939 @ Sheboygan, WI: Indianapolis Kautskys 39, Sheboygan Red Skins 47
- March 12, 1939 @ Sheboygan, WI: Cleveland White Horses 51, Sheboygan Red Skins 45

=== Awards and honors ===
- NBL All-Time Team – Ed Dancker

== World Professional Basketball Tournament ==
For the first time ever, the World Professional Basketball Tournament, an annual basketball tournament held in Chicago, would begin operations in what would be an annual event for a decade-long process (lasting nearly as long as the rest of the NBL's lifespan). With the first ever tournament held for this event, the only NBL teams participating in this event would be the Sheboygan Red Skins (the new NBL team for this season) and in-state rivaling Oshkosh All-Stars for the inaugural 1939 event that was held on March 26–28, 1939 and was mostly held by independently ran teams alongside the Troy Celtics of the rivaling American Basketball League. (Originally, the Philadelphia Sphas team that was also from the rivaling American Basketball League were intended to also join the WPBT as the other ABL team participating in the event, but due to them being too injured to participate, they were replaced with the Illinois Grads team involving college graduate students that played basketball in nearby Champagne, Illinois.) Due to the odd number of teams participating in this event this year (eleven total teams, likely due to the ABL's Philadelphia Sphas being replaced with the Illinois Grads), the WPBT were forced to implement a unique system of sorts where three teams were given a bye in the first round and one team was given a bye in the quarterfinal round only. Because the first round byes were given to the Chicago Harmons (who were actually the former ABL team and future NBL team known as the Chicago Bruins under a different name for this event), the ABL's Troy Celtics, and the Hall of Fame worthy all-black New York Renaissance, the Red Skins were forced to play their first match of the event under the opening round against the same Illinois Grads replacement team mentioned earlier on for the tournament. In the first round, Sheboygan would easily crush the Illinois Grads team (what with them being graduate students representing a nearby university going up against a professional basketball team at the last moment possible) in a 47–29 blowout win.

For the semifinal round, however, it was revealed that the one quarterfinal team that would be given a bye for that round (and therefore a subsequent automatic trip to the semifinal round for the inaugural event) would be the Oshkosh All-Stars. Because of that fact, the Red Skins would have to compete against one of the teams that were given a first round bye within the quarterfinal round, which would be the Troy Celtics from the rivaling American Basketball League. Luckily for them, Sheboygan would end up defeating the Celtics with a 36–29 victory, which led to them moving onto the semifinal round against their cityside rivals, the Oshkosh All-Stars. Unfortunately for Sheboygan, this would be the end of their chances of winning that tournament due to them getting blown out by Oshkosh with a massive 40–23 defeat, though the Red Skins would be able to compete for a third-place finish instead. However, the third place consolation prize match that Sheboygan would have had them going up against the world famous (all-black) Harlem Globetrotters, who had stumbled into the third place game by losing to the similarly all-black New York Renaissance (who could be considered a 100% serious version of the Harlem Globetrotters) in the semifinal round after previously defeating the Fort Wayne Harvesters in the first round and then the Chicago Harmons in the quarterfinal round. As a result of that fact, the Red Skins would become victims of the Globetrotters' comedic chicannery that the Harlem franchise would be well known for; while Sheboygan would admittedly keep things close with the world famous squad, their best efforts wouldn't be enough to pull off an upset victory, as the Red Skins would lose 36–33 to the Globetrotters. Despite the less than ideal ending Sheboygan got in their first venture in this tournament, they would still see one of their players make it to the inaugural All-Tournament Team with center Ed Dancker being named as a member alongside Leroy Edwards from the Oshkosh All-Stars, Babe Pressley from the Harlem Globetrotters, and Zack Clayton and WPBT MVP Puggy Bell from the inaugural WPBT champion New York Renaissance.

=== Games ===
- Won the first round (47–29) to the Illinois Grads.
- Won quarterfinal round (36–29) to the Troy Celtics.
- Lost semifinal round (23–40) to the Oshkosh All-Stars.
- Lost third place consolation prize game (33–36) to the Harlem Globetrotters.

=== Awards and honors ===
- Ed Dancker, All-Tournament Team
