= 1939–40 Sheboygan Red Skins season =

NBL professional basketball team season

- Division champions
- Head coach: Frank Zummach
- Arena: Eagles Auditorium

Results
- Record: 15–13 (.536)
- Place: Division: T–1st (Tied with the Oshkosh All-Stars) (Western)
- Playoff finish: Lost Western Division Playoff to the Oshkosh All-Stars, 2–1

The 1939–40 Sheboygan Red Skins season was the Red Skins' second year in the United States' National Basketball League (NBL), which would also be the third year the NBL itself existed. However, if one were to include their few seasons they played as an independent team under a few various team names involving local businesses like the The Ballhorns (being sponsored by a local florist and funeral parlor), the Art Imigs (being sponsored by a local dry cleaning shop owned and operated by a man named Art Imig with team jerseys saying Art Imig's), and the Enzo Jels (being sponsored by a local gelatin manufacturer known as Enzo-Pac) at various points before becoming the Sheboygan Red Skins due to their promotion up into the NBL, this would officially be their seventh overall season of play as well. For the second straight season in a row, the Red Skins would represent the Western Division, with four teams in each of the Eastern Division and Western Division (Sheboygan's division), though this season would see the Chicago Bruins (a former original American Basketball League team owned by Chicago Bears NFL team owner George Halas) replacing the Pittsburgh Pirates NBL team alongside the Cleveland White Horses (who had previously moved the Warren Penns franchise from Warren, Pennsylvania to Cleveland, Ohio on February 10, 1939) being moved to Detroit, Michigan to become the Detroit Eagles for the rest of their existence going forward. They also saw Frank Zummach replacing Edwin Schutte for the head coaching role for this season.

The Red Skins played their home games at the Eagles Auditorium. Throughout this season, Sheboygan would see themselves struggle to gain any sort of serious ground against both the newly joined Chicago Bruins (who started out strongly, but ended the season in a weaker manner by comparison) and the Red Skins' cityside rivals in the Oshkosh All-Stars (who would start the season with their worst start in the NBL yet, but would gain enough ground later in the season to become serious contenders in the Western Division once again). As such, their season would see them compete with both Chicago and Oshkosh for not just getting the best record in the Western Division, but also seeing if they could obtain one of the two open playoff spots in that division for that season as well. By the end of the season, the Sheboygan Red Skins would tie with the Oshkosh All-Stars for first place in the Western Division with a 15–13 record, meaning they would not only succeed in obtaining one of the open playoff spots for this season, but also technically tie with Oshkosh for being named Western Division champions for this season as well. However, due to Oshkosh scoring more points than Sheboygan in the regular season matches they played this season, it would technically be the Oshkosh All-Stars who would be named both the Western Division regular season champions and the #1 seed there, though the Red Skins would be given home court advantage to make up for that decision by the NBL. Despite the awkward way the NBL decided upon who would be considered the Western Division's official winner and who would be the team with the home court advantage this time around, Sheboygan would find out that the home court advantage they were given was not really considered an advantage since the All-Stars would make easy work of the Red Skins in their sole game in Oshkosh while making the matches in Sheboygan close matches in the other two games played against them, with Oshkosh ultimately winning the Western Division Playoff series 2–1 (though failing to avenge their previous NBL championship losses in their 1939 championship rematch against the Akron Firestone Non-Skids). Following the conclusion of this season, both Otto Kolar and Rube Lautenschlager ended up being named members of the All-NBL Second Team, which was the first time any of Sheboygan's players received such an honor this season.

== Roster ==
1939–40 Sheboygan Red Skins roster
Players

Pos.	No.	Player	Height	Weight	DOB	From
G/F		Sparky Adams	6 ft 1 in (1.85 m)	185 lb (84 kg)	1917–04–04	Marquette
G		Marv Colen	6 ft 0 in (1.83 m)	170 lb (77 kg)	1915–03–08	Loyola Chicago
C		Ed Dancker	6 ft 7 in (2.01 m)	200 lb (91 kg)	1914–03–14	South Division HS (WI)
F/C		George Hesik	6 ft 2 in (1.88 m)	195 lb (88 kg)	1913–06–15	Marquette
G/F		Otto Kolar	6 ft 3 in (1.91 m)	180 lb (82 kg)	1911–12–06	J. Sterling Morton HS (IL)
F		Les Kuplic	6 ft 3 in (1.91 m)	200 lb (91 kg)	1911–09–23	Beloit
G/F		Rube Lautenschlager	6 ft 2 in (1.88 m)	190 lb (86 kg)	1915–09–07	UW–Oshkosh
G		Johnny Posewitz	6 ft 0 in (1.83 m)	185 lb (84 kg)	1906–08–09	Sheboygan HS (WI)?
G		Scoop Posewitz	5 ft 11 in (1.80 m)	180 lb (82 kg)	1908–09–12	Sheboygan HS (WI)?
G		Dave Quabius	5 ft 11 in (1.80 m)	185 lb (84 kg)	1916–03–16	Marquette
F		Paul Sokody	6 ft 2 in (1.88 m)	170 lb (77 kg)	1914–08–18	Marquette
G		Ken Suesens	6 ft 1 in (1.85 m)	175 lb (79 kg)	1916–10–23	Iowa
G/F		Duane Swanson	6 ft 1 in (1.85 m)	185 lb (84 kg)	1913–08–23	Waterman HS (IL)
F/C		Stan Zadel	6 ft 5 in (1.96 m)	215 lb (98 kg)	1916–04–08	DePaul

Coaches
Head coach
- Frank Zummach

Legend
- (DP) Unsigned draft pick
- (FA) Free agent
- (S) Suspended
- Injured

Roster

Note: Brothers Johnny and Scoop Posewitz alongside Dave Quabius were not on the playoff roster for this season, though Dave Quabius would return in time for the 1940 World Professional Basketball Tournament to replace Les Kuplic there.

== Regular season ==
=== Season standings ===
Pos.	Western Division	Wins	Losses	Win %
T–1	Oshkosh All-Stars	15	13	.536
T–1	Sheboygan Red Skins	15	13	.536
3	Chicago Bruins	14	14	.500
4	Hammond Ciesar All-Americans	9	19	.321

=== NBL Schedule ===
Not to be confused with exhibition or other non-NBL scheduled games that did not count towards Sheboygan's official NBL record for this season. An official database created by John Grasso detailing every NBL match possible (outside of two matches that the Kankakee Gallagher Trojans won over the Dayton Metropolitans in 1938) would be released in 2026 showcasing every team's official schedules throughout their time spent in the NBL. As such, these are the official results recorded for the Sheboygan Red Skins during their second season in the NBL.

- November 22, 1939 @ Sheboygan, WI: Akron Goodyear Wingfoots 37, Sheboygan Red Skins 32
- November 29, 1939 @ Sheboygan, WI: Hammond Ciesar All-Americans 32, Sheboygan Red Skins 35
- December 3, 1939 @ Hammond, IN: Sheboygan Red Skins 41, Hammond Ciesar All-Americans 28
- December 7, 1939 @ Sheboygan, WI: Akron Firestone Non-Skids 40, Sheboygan Red Skins 41
- December 12, 1939 @ Detroit, MI: Sheboygan Red Skins 38, Detroit Eagles 48
- December 13, 1939 @ Indianapolis, IN: Sheboygan Red Skins 34, Indianapolis Kautskys 37
- December 16, 1939 @ Akron, OH: Sheboygan Red Skins 45, Akron Goodyear Wingfoots 36
- December 17, 1939 @ Akron, OH: Sheboygan Red Skins 38, Akron Firestone Non-Skids 42
- December 21, 1939 @ Sheboygan, WI: Sheboygan Red Skins 37, Oshkosh All-Stars 29
- December 23, 1939 @ Oshkosh, WI: Sheboygan Red Skins 33, Oshkosh All-Stars 49
- December 28, 1939 @ Sheboygan, WI: Indianapolis Kautskys 36, Sheboygan Red Skins 42
- January 4, 1940 @ Sheboygan, WI: Akron Goodyear Wingfoots 22, Sheboygan Red Skins 24
- January 7, 1940 @ Chicago, IL: Chicago Bruins 19, Sheboygan Red Skins 20
- January 11, 1940 @ Sheboygan, WI: Detroit Eagles 33, Sheboygan Red Skins 41
- January 18, 1940 @ Sheboygan, WI: Chicago Bruins 45, Sheboygan Red Skins 37
- January 21, 1940 @ Hammond, IN: Sheboygan Red Skins 31, Hammond Ciesar All-Americans 32
- January 23, 1940 @ Detroit, MI: Sheboygan Red Skins 31, Detroit Eagles 40
- January 24, 1940 @ Akron, OH: Sheboygan Red Skins 38, Akron Firestone Non-Skids 59
- January 25, 1940 @ Akron, OH: Sheboygan Red Skins 31, Akron Goodyear Wingfoots 28
- February 1, 1940 @ Sheboygan, WI: Hammond Ciesar All-Americans 36, Sheboygan Red Skins 43
- February 4, 1940 @ Sheboygan, WI: Indianapolis Kautskys 36, Sheboygan Red Skins 44
- February 8, 1940 @ Sheboygan, WI: Chicago Bruins 35, Sheboygan Red Skins 38
- February 15, 1940 @ Sheboygan, WI: Oshkosh All-Stars 36, Sheboygan Red Skins 42
- February 17, 1940 @ Oshkosh, WI: Sheboygan Red Skins 43, Oshkosh All-Stars 68
- February 21, 1940 @ Chicago, IL: Sheboygan Red Skins 34, Chicago Bruins 41
- February 22, 1940 @ Sheboygan, WI: Detroit Eagles 42, Sheboygan Red Skins 43
- February 26, 1940 @ Indianapolis, IN: Sheboygan Red Skins 40, Indianapolis Kautskys 44
- February 29, 1940 @ Akron, OH: Sheboygan Red Skins 32, Akron Firestone Non-Skids 42

== NBL Playoffs ==
=== NBL Western Division Playoff ===
(1/2W) Sheboygan Red Skins vs. (2/1W) Oshkosh All-Stars: Oshkosh wins series 2–1

- Game 1: March 7, 1940 @ Oshkosh: Oshkosh 41, Sheboygan 24
- Game 2: March 8, 1940 @ Sheboygan: Sheboygan 43, Oshkosh 42
- Game 3: March 9, 1940 @ Sheboygan: Oshkosh 31, Sheboygan 29

=== Awards and honors ===
- All-NBL Second Team – Otto Kolar and Rube Lautenschlager
- NBL All-Time Team – Ed Dancker

== World Professional Basketball Tournament ==
For the second year in a row, the Sheboygan Red Skins would participate in what could now be seen as the annual World Professional Basketball Tournament in Chicago, which the 1940 event was held on March 18–22, 1940 and was mostly held by independently ran teams alongside the cityside rivaling Oshkosh All-Stars and the newly added (or returning due to their past history) Chicago Bruins from the NBL alongside the Washington Heurich Brewers from the rivaling American Basketball League. For the first round, Sheboygan would go up against the Rochester Seagrams, an independent team that eventually went on to become the Sacramento Kings of the National Basketball Association in the present day. Despite the notable presence at hand with that match, the Red Skins would end up defeating the Seagrams with a 44–32 victory in order to move on to the quarterfinal round, with Otto Kolar scoring 18 points and Paul Sokody scoring 10 points for their victory over Rochester. In the quarterfinal round, Sheboygan would go up against the Syracuse Reds, a briefly existing team created by an Austria-Hungary (now Hungary) born immigrant named Frank Basloe that previously were from the New York State Basketball League that were also a spinoff team to his main team in the 31st Separate Company of Herkimer, New York that got created some years ago (and allegedly might have played the first-ever professional basketball game) who also had a first round bye alongside the ABL's Washington Heurich Brewers in this year's tournament. While the Reds would be without team captain Wilmeth Sidat-Singh and Bob Stewart due to them playing for the Seagrams during the WPBT this time around, Syracuse would end up upsetting the Red Skins by blowing past them with a 39–30 defeat for Sheboygan. As a result of their defeat, the Red Skins would be eliminated from trying to get into the semifinal round (meaning none of their players would earn any awards or honors this time around in the WPBT), while the Syracuse Reds would be eliminated by the new eventual WPBT champions in the world famous (all-black) Harlem Globetrotters, with the Globetrotters getting their WPBT championship over the NBL's Chicago Bruins and the Reds losing their third place consolation prize game to the American Basketball League's Washington Heurich Brewers.

=== Games ===
- Won first round (44–32) over the Rochester Seagrams.
- Lost quarterfinal round (30–39) to the Syracuse Reds.
