= 1940–41 Hammond Ciesar All-Americans season =

NBL professional basketball team season

- Head coach: Carl Anderson (player-coach)
- General manager: Edward "Eddie" Ciesar
- Owner: Edward "Eddie" Ciesar
- Arena: Hammond Civic Center

Results
- Record: 6–18 (.250)
- Place: Division: 7th
- Playoff finish: Did not qualify

The 1940–41 Hammond Ciesar All-Americans season was the fourth and final professional basketball season of play for the franchise and third and final official season of play for the Hammond Ciesar All-Americans under that name following their move from Whiting to Hammond, Indiana under the National Basketball League, which was also in its fourth season that it existed as a professional basketball league after previously existing as a semi-pro or amateur basketball league called the Midwest Basketball Conference in its first two seasons back in 1935. However, if you include their brief time as an independent team before later joining the Midwest Basketball Conference in its second and final season of existence when they first started out as the Whiting Ciesar All-Americans, this would officially be considered their at least their sixth and final season of existence as a team.

This season would also be the only season where the Ciesar All-Americans would compete in the NBL without any divisions involved in the league (which later became its first of four seasons to do so) due to the NBL originally planning to have only six teams competing in this season with the Indianapolis Kautskys testing out how they'd do as a barnstorming team and the Detroit Eagles having issues with securing a deal for their home venue at the time before a last minute deal the Detroit franchise had (due to new owners) allowed for the Eagles to return in time to get the NBL to start the season with seven teams at hand.

Before the season began, the Hammond Ciesar All-Americans would replace head coach Leo Bereolos with a new player-coach in Carl Anderson to be the last head coach that the Ciesar All-Americans would ever have as a team. However, the replacement of head coaches would lead to Hammond having a worse season for their final NBL season of play than the previous season they had with a 6–18 record. Due to the combination of rising costs and a lack of profits at hand with the Ciesar All-Americans franchise, team owner Edward "Eddie" Ciesar would end up folding the team's operations for good by the end of this season, making this their last season they would have as a franchise. However, the city of Hammond, Indiana would later have a new team playing in the NBL by its final season of play with the Hammond Calumet Buccaneers playing for the 1948–49 NBL season. Despite this season being the team's final season as a whole, the Hammond Ciesar All-Americans would have two of their players from this season in Bobby Neu and Ralph Vaughn (the latter of whom would end up playing for the Chicago Bruins later in the season) both end up making it to the All-NBL Second Team for their final season of play.

== Roster ==
Please note that due to the way records for professional basketball leagues like the NBL and the ABL were recorded at the time, some information on both teams and players may be harder to list out than usual here.

| Player | Position |
|---|---|
| Carl Anderson | G |
| Bill Behr | G |
| Emil Benko | G |
| Al Benson | C |
| Wink Bowman | G |
| Bob Dille | F |
| Dick Evans | F-C |
| Teddy Falda | G |
| James Goff | F-C |
| Jim Higgins | C |
| Dar Hutchins | F-C |
| Splinter Johnson | F-C |
| Bobby Neu | G-F |
| Tom O'Toole | C |
| Paul Price | F |
| Clem Ruh | G |
| Joe Sotak | F-C |
| Bill Sumerix | G |
| Chet Tollstam | F-C |
| Ralph Vaughn | G-F |

== Regular season ==
=== NBL Schedule ===
Not to be confused with exhibition or other non-NBL scheduled games that did not count towards Hammond's official NBL record for this season. An official database created by John Grasso detailing every NBL match possible (outside of two matches that the Kankakee Gallagher Trojans won over the Dayton Metropolitans in 1938) would be released in 2026 showcasing every team's official schedules throughout their time spent in the NBL. As such, these are the official results recorded for the Hammond Ciesar All-Americans during their fourth and final season (third and final season under the Hammond Ciesar All-Americans name) in the NBL.

- December 1, 1940 @ Hammond, IN: Akron Goodyear Wingfoots 54, Hammond Ciesar All-Americans 38
- December 7, 1940 @ Oshkosh, WI: Hammond Ciesar All-Americans 27, Oshkosh All-Stars 44
- December 8, 1940 @ Hammond, IN: Akron Firestone Non-Skids 34, Hammond Ciesar All-Americans 37
- December 12, 1940 @ Sheboygan, WI: Hammond Ciesar All-Americans 42, Sheboygan Red Skins 54
- December 15, 1940 @ Hammond, IN: Sheboygan Red Skins 40, Hammond Ciesar All-Americans 35
- December 17, 1940 @ Akron, OH: Hammond Ciesar All-Americans 36, Akron Goodyear Wingfoots 39
- December 18, 1940 @ Detroit, MI: Hammond Ciesar All-Americans 36, Detroit Eagles 43
- December 22, 1940 @ Hammond, IN: Chicago Bruins 33, Hammond Ciesar All-Americans 41
- December 25, 1940 @ Chicago, IL: Hammond Ciesar All-Americans 46, Chicago Bruins 50
- January 5, 1941 @ Hammond, IN: Akron Goodyear Wingfoots 46, Hammond Ciesar All-Americans 50
- January 9, 1941 @ Sheboygan, WI: Hammond Ciesar All-Americans 34, Sheboygan Red Skins 33
- January 12, 1941 @ Hammond, IN: Oshkosh All-Stars 32, Hammond Ciesar All-Americans 43
- January 21, 1941 @ Akron, OH: Hammond Ciesar All-Americans 41, Akron Firestone Non-Skids 45
- January 22, 1941 @ Akron, OH: Hammond Ciesar All-Americans 35, Akron Goodyear Wingfoots 42
- January 23, 1941 @ Detroit, MI: Hammond Ciesar All-Americans 52, Detroit Eagles 61
- January 26, 1941 @ Hammond, IN: Chicago Bruins 43, Hammond Ciesar All-Americans 33
- February 1, 1941 @ Oshkosh, WI: Hammond Ciesar All-Americans 38, Oshkosh All-Stars 60
- February 2, 1941 @ Hammond, IN: Sheboygan Red Skins 49, Hammond Ciesar All-Americans 40
- February 9, 1941 @ Hammond, IN: Akron Firestone Non-Skids 38, Hammond Ciesar All-Americans 41
- February 16, 1941 @ Hammond, IN: Oshkosh All-Stars 64, Hammond Ciesar All-Americans 45
- February 18, 1941 @ Akron, OH: Hammond Ciesar All-Americans 37, Akron Firestone Non-Skids 47
- February 23, 1941 (Game 1 @ Hammond, IN): Detroit Eagles 47, Hammond Ciesar All-Americans 42
- February 23, 1941 (Game 2 @ Hammond, IN): Detroit Eagles 40, Hammond Ciesar All-Americans 39
- February 26, 1941 @ Chicago, IL: Hammond Ciesar All-Americans 18, Chicago Bruins 27

=== Season standings ===
| Pos. | League Standings | Wins | Losses | Win % |
|---|---|---|---|---|
| 1 | Oshkosh All-Stars | 18 | 6 | .750 |
| T–2 | Sheboygan Red Skins | 13 | 11 | .542 |
| T–2 | Akron Firestone Non-Skids | 13 | 11 | .542 |
| 4 | Detroit Eagles | 12 | 12 | .500 |
| T–5 | Chicago Bruins | 11 | 13 | .458 |
| T–5 | Akron Goodyear Wingfoots | 11 | 13 | .458 |
| 7 | Hammond Ciesar All-Americans | 6 | 18 | .250 |

=== Awards and honors ===
- All-NBL Second Team – Bobby Neu and Ralph Vaughn
