= 1938–39 Hammond Ciesar All-Americans season =

NBL professional basketball team season

- Head coach: Whitey Wickhorst (3–20); Lou Boudreau (1–4; interim player-coach)
- General manager: Edward "Eddie" Ciesar
- Owner: Edward "Eddie" Ciesar
- Arena: Hammond Civic Center

Results
- Record: 4–24 (.143)
- Place: Division: 4th (Western)
- Playoff finish: Did not qualify

The 1938–39 Hammond Ciesar All-Americans season was the second professional basketball season of play for the franchise and first official season for the Hammond Ciesar All-Americans under that new name following their move from Whiting to Hammond, Indiana under the National Basketball League, which was also in its second season that it existed as a professional basketball league after previously existing as a semi-pro or amateur basketball league called the Midwest Basketball Conference in its first two seasons back in 1935. However, if you include their brief time as an independent team before later joining the Midwest Basketball Conference in its second and final season of existence when they first started out as the Whiting Ciesar All-Americans, this would officially be considered at least their fourth season of existence as a team. After playing their only home NBL Playoff game in Hammond, team owner and general manager Edward "Eddie" Ciesar would move the Ciesar All-Americans from Whiting to Hammond to start out the season, making the Ciesar All-Americans the only NBL team to move from one location to another to start out their second season of play. As a result of this move from Whiting to Hammond, the Ciesar All-Americans entered this season as a part of the Western Division for the second straight season, with eight total teams (four total representing both the Eastern and Western Divisions this time around) participating in the NBL this season after six teams from the inaugural NBL season left the league or otherwise folded operations and the Sheboygan Red Skins joined the NBL on New Year's Eve of 1938. With their move to Hammond, the Hammond Ciesar All-Americans would play their home games at the Hammond Civic Center (which had completed its construction by the start of this season), which would be their home venue for the rest of their existence going forward.

While the Ciesar All-Americans did have (two-time) future Naismith Basketball Hall of Famer John Wooden playing for the team this season similar to their only NBL season in Whiting, Wooden would only play five games for Hammond before deciding to play for the Indianapolis Kautskys (his original playing team after college) once again by a trade in order to end his playing career in the NBL there due to a combination of knee problems, family obligations, and growing frustrations with playing professional basketball on a more regular basis than he had intended to do so for this season. As a result of that major loss for the team, Hammond would end up having their worst season in the NBL by having a total of four wins (all at home) and 24 losses (including one that came through a match that they forfeited against the Cleveland White Horses on March 5, 1939) to have the worst record in the league this season after previously being an inaugural NBL playoff team while out in Whiting. Not only that, but near the end of the season, Hammond would end up firing head coach Whitey Wickhorst (who had a 3–20 record by this point in time) and replaced him with future Baseball Hall of Fame member and Cleveland Indians turned Hammond Ciesar All-Americans player Lou Boudreau as a player-coach (who would get a 1–4 record in the final five games coached for the season). Despite the sudden, dramatic failure they had in terms of play following their move from Whiting to Hammond, the Ciesar All-Americans would continue to play in the NBL for another season after this one ended.

== Roster ==
Please note that due to the way records for professional basketball leagues like the NBL and the ABL were recorded at the time, some information on both teams and players may be harder to list out than usual here.

Player	Position
Emil Benko	G
Lou Boudreau	G-F
Ed Campion	G
Pick Dehner	F-C
Steve Fowdy	F
Nick Hashu	F-C
Robert Kessler	F
Robert McElliott	F-C
Vince McGowan	F-C
Tommy Nisbet	G
Vince Oliver	G
William Perigo	F-C
Joe Sotak	F-C
Joe Stack	G-F
Jack Thornton	F-C
John Townsend	F-C
Bill Wendt	F
John Wooden	G
Nick Yost	F-C

Weirdly enough, this team would have five players that would have full names that are currently unknown for the general public (and are likely lost to time) that played at least one game for Hammond, yet are only known by either a last name or an alias name of sorts in a forward named "Boris", a guard named "Brown", a forward named "James", a guard named "Sicky", and a forward named "Willett" (the last one presumed to likely be either Irving Willett or Dick Willett, who were brothers that had played for a nearby team called the Cincinnati Roths around the same time one of them could have played for Hammond) that are all only known through either their last names or by one-name aliases of sorts.

== Regular season ==
=== Season standings ===
Pos.	Western Division	Wins	Losses	Win %
1	Oshkosh All-Stars	17	11	.607
2	Indianapolis Kautskys	13	13	.500
3	Sheboygan Red Skins	11	17	.393
4	Hammond Ciesar All-Americans	4	24	.143

=== NBL Schedule ===
- November 23, 1938 @ Pittsburgh, PA: Hammond Ciesar All-Americans 30, Pittsburgh Pirates 40
- November 25, 1938 @ Akron, OH: Hammond Ciesar All-Americans 30, Akron Goodyear Wingfoots 33
- November 27, 1938 @ Akron, OH: Hammond Ciesar All-Americans 35, Akron Firestone Non-Skids 38
- November 28, 1938 @ Warren, PA: Hammond Ciesar All-Americans 28, Warren Penns 48
- December 4, 1938 @ Hammond, IN: Akron Firestone Non-Skids 40, Hammond Ciesar All-Americans 29
- December 11, 1938 @ Hammond, IN: Sheboygan Red Skins 35, Hammond Ciesar All-Americans 30
- December 14, 1938 @ Sheboygan, WI: Hammond Ciesar All-Americans 30, Sheboygan Red Skins 36
- December 18, 1938: Akron Goodyear Wingfoots 40, Hammond Ciesar All-Americans 36 (OT @ Hammond, IN)
- December 25, 1938 @ Indianapolis, IN: Hammond Ciesar All-Americans 33, Indianapolis Kautskys 44
- December 27, 1938 @ Akron, OH: Hammond Ciesar All-Americans 35, Akron Firestone Non-Skids 60
- December 28, 1938 @ Pittsburgh, PA: Hammond Ciesar All-Americans 38, Pittsburgh Pirates 44
- December 29, 1938 @ Warren, PA: Hammond Ciesar All-Americans 41, Warren Penns 48
- December 30, 1938 @ Akron, OH: Hammond Ciesar All-Americans 33, Akron Goodyear Wingfoots 43
- January 2, 1939 @ Hammond, IN: Warren Penns 35, Hammond Ciesar All-Americans 36
- January 4, 1939 @ Sheboygan, WI: Hammond Ciesar All-Americans 37, Sheboygan Red Skins 42
- January 7, 1939 @ Oshkosh, WI: Hammond Ciesar All-Americans 28, Oshkosh All-Stars 53
- January 8, 1939 @ Hammond, IN: Pittsburgh Pirates 29, Hammond Ciesar All-Americans 55
- January 15, 1939 @ Hammond, IN: Oshkosh All-Stars 64, Hammond Ciesar All-Americans 40
- January 22, 1939 @ Hammond, IN: Akron Goodyear Wingfoots 54, Hammond Ciesar All-Americans 48
- January 26, 1939 @ Frankfort, IN: Indianapolis Kautskys 60, Hammond Ciesar All-Americans 53
- January 29, 1939 @ Hammond, IN: Sheboygan Red Skins 29, Hammond Ciesar All-Americans 27
- February 5, 1939 @ Hammond, IN: Indianapolis Kautskys 39, Hammond Ciesar All-Americans 44
- February 12, 1939 @ Hammond, IN: Pittsburgh Pirates 35, Hammond Ciesar All-Americans 31
- February 18, 1939 @ Oshkosh, WI: Hammond Ciesar All-Americans 36, Oshkosh All-Stars 42
- February 19, 1939 @ Hammond, IN: Akron Firestone Non-Skids 40, Hammond Ciesar All-Americans 36
- February 26, 1939 @ Hammond, IN: Oshkosh All-Stars 23, Hammond Ciesar All-Americans 28
- March 5, 1939 @ Hammond, IN: The Cleveland White Horses would win over the Hammond Ciesar All-Americans by forfeiture. (As such, 2–0 favoring the Cleveland White Horses would be the official recorded score for this match.)
- March 6, 1939 @ Indianapolis, IN: Hammond Ciesar All-Americans 32, Indianapolis Kautskys 43
