= List of NBA players (P–Q) =

This is a list of National Basketball Association players whose last names begin with P or Q.

The list also includes players from the American National Basketball League (NBL), the Basketball Association of America (BAA), and the original American Basketball Association (ABA). All of these leagues contributed to the formation of the present-day NBA.

Individuals who played in the NBL prior to its 1949 merger with the BAA are listed in italics, as they are not traditionally listed in the NBA's official player registers.

== P ==
- Joe Pace
- Zaza Pachulia
- Robert Pack
- Wayne Pack
- Gerald Paddio
- Scott Padgett
- Dana Pagett
- Jaysean Paige
- Marcus Paige
- Fred Paine
- Milt Palacio
- Togo Palazzi
- Bud Palmer
- Errol Palmer
- Jim Palmer
- Trayvon Palmer
- Walter Palmer
- Kevin Pangos
- Andy Panko
- Georgios Papagiannis
- Kostas Papanikolaou
- Jannero Pargo
- Jeremy Pargo
- Easy Parham
- Robert Parish
- Med Park
- Anthony Parker
- Jabari Parker
- Smush Parker
- Sonny Parker
- Tony Parker
- Barry Parkhill
- Jack Parkinson
- Charles Parks
- Cherokee Parks
- Rich Parks
- Jack Parr
- Doyle Parrack
- Eddie Parry
- Charlie Parsley
- Bob Parsons
- Chandler Parsons
- Eric Paschall
- Anžejs Pasečņiks
- Pete Pasko
- Žarko Paspalj
- Marty Passaglia
- George Pastushok
- Joe Patanelli
- Myles Patrick
- Stan Patrick
- Andrae Patterson
- George Patterson
- Lamar Patterson
- Patrick Patterson
- Ray Patterson
- Ruben Patterson
- Steve Patterson
- Tom Patterson
- Worthy Patterson
- Justin Patton
- Brandon Paul
- Chris Paul
- Charlie Paulk
- Jerry Paulson
- Billy Paultz
- Sasha Pavlović
- Johnny Pawk
- Steve Pawk
- Jim Paxson
- Jim Paxson, Sr.
- John Paxson
- John Payak
- Adreian Payne
- Cameron Payne
- Kenny Payne
- Tom Payne
- Elfrid Payton
- Gary Payton
- Gary Payton II
- Mel Payton
- George Pearcy
- Henry Pearcy
- Koa Peat
- Micah Peavy
- Oleksiy Pecherov
- Wiley Peck
- Pete Pederson
- Sean Pedulla
- Rich Peek
- Anthony Peeler
- George Peeples
- Nikola Peković
- Jake Pelkington
- Norvel Pelle
- Sam Pellom
- Mike Penberthy
- Noah Penda
- Jerry Pender
- Desmond Penigar
- Kirk Penney
- Mike Peplowski
- Will Perdue
- Mãozinha Pereira
- William Perigo
- Kendrick Perkins
- Sam Perkins
- Warren Perkins
- Kosta Perović
- London Perrantes
- Aulcie Perry
- Charles Perry
- Curtis Perry
- Elliot Perry
- Reggie Perry
- Ron Perry
- Tim Perry
- Chuck Person
- Wesley Person
- Taelon Peter
- Alec Peters
- Jim Petersen
- Loy Petersen
- Bob Peterson
- Darryn Peterson
- Drew Peterson
- Ed Peterson
- Mel Peterson
- Morris Peterson
- Geoff Petrie
- Johan Petro
- Dražen Petrović
- Filip Petrušev
- Richard Petruška
- Bob Pettit
- Jerry Pettway
- Tony Peyton
- Squint Phares
- Roger Phegley
- Jack Phelan
- Jim Phelan
- Derrick Phelps
- Mike Phelps
- Andy Phillip
- Bob Phillips
- Eddie Phillips
- Gary Phillips
- Gene Phillips
- Julian Phillips
- Willie Phillips
- Bobby Phills
- Labaron Philon Jr.
- Jack Piana
- Eric Piatkowski
- Walt Piatkowski
- Jalen Pickett
- Jamorko Pickett
- Paul Pierce
- Ricky Pierce
- Jaron Pierre Jr.
- Stan Pietkiewicz
- Mickaël Piétrus
- John Pilch
- Ed Pinckney
- Kevinn Pinkney
- John Pinone
- Theo Pinson
- Dave Piontek
- Tom Piotrowski
- Scottie Pippen
- Scotty Pippen Jr.
- Charles Pittman
- Dexter Pittman
- Woody Pitzer
- Eric Plahn
- Zoran Planinić
- Tibor Pleiß
- Daeqwon Plowden
- Marshall Plumlee
- Mason Plumlee
- Miles Plumlee
- Gary Plummer
- Pavel Podkolzin
- Brandin Podziemski
- Vincent Poirier
- Aleksej Pokuševski
- Dwayne Polee
- Jim Pollard
- Scot Pollard
- Ralph Polson
- Jakob Pöltl
- Olden Polynice
- John Poncar
- Cliff Pondexter
- Quincy Pondexter
- Shamorie Ponds
- Yves Pons
- Jordan Poole
- David Pope
- Mark Pope
- Dave Popson
- Ben Poquette
- Chris Porter
- Craig Porter Jr.
- Howard Porter
- Jontay Porter
- Kevin Porter
- Kevin Porter Jr.
- Michael Porter Jr.
- Otto Porter Jr.
- Terry Porter
- Willie Porter
- Bobby Portis
- Bob Portman
- Kristaps Porziņģis
- Johnny Posewitz
- Scoop Posewitz
- James Posey
- Lou Possner
- Quinten Post
- Lavor Postell
- John Postley
- Vitaly Potapenko
- Micah Potter
- John Poulakidas
- Leon Powe
- Cincy Powell
- Drake Powell
- Dwight Powell
- Josh Powell
- Kasib Powell
- Longie Powell
- Myles Powell
- Norman Powell
- Roger Powell
- Alex Poythress
- Marlbert Pradd
- Erv Prasse
- Mike Pratt
- Pete Preboske
- Paul Pressey
- Phil Pressey
- Babe Pressley
- Dominic Pressley
- Harold Pressley
- Jason Preston
- Steve Previs
- A. J. Price
- Al Price
- Bernie Price
- Brent Price
- Jim Price
- Mark Price
- Mike Price
- Paul Price
- Ronnie Price
- Tony Price
- Bob Priddy
- Pablo Prigioni
- Joshua Primo
- Taurean Prince
- Tayshaun Prince
- John Pritchard
- Kevin Pritchard
- Payton Pritchard
- Lorvin Proctor
- Tyrese Proctor
- Cy Proffitt
- Laron Profit
- Joe Proksa
- Olivier-Maxence Prosper
- Gabe Pruitt
- Red Pryor
- Joel Przybilla
- Les Pugh
- Roy Pugh
- Anthony Pullard
- Jacob Pullen
- Zyon Pullin
- Rodney Purvis
- Don Putman
- Scoop Putnam

== Q ==
- Dave Quabius
- Tim Quarterman
- Derik Queen
- Trevelin Queen
- Neemias Queta
- Bob Quick
- Immanuel Quickley
- Jim Quinlan
- Bart Quinn
- Chris Quinn
- Brian Quinnett
- Lester Quiñones
