= 1938–39 Indianapolis Kautskys season =

NBL professional basketball team season

- Head coach: Bob Nipper
- General manager: Frank Kautsky; Abe Goldsmith
- Owner(s): Frank Kautsky; Pete Bailey
- Arena: Butler Fieldhouse

Results
- Record: 13–13 (.500)
- Place: Division: 2nd (Western)
- Playoff finish: Did not qualify (Playoffs was just the NBL Championship this season.)

The 1938–39 Indianapolis Kautskys season was the second professional basketball season of play that the Kautskys franchise would not only utilize that name for their team, but also played in the United States' National Basketball League (NBL), which was also the second year the league existed. However, if you include their previous three seasons where they played in predecessor leagues of sorts in the National Professional Basketball League and the Midwest Basketball Conference, as well as the couple of independent seasons they had in their history, then this would actually be their sixth season of play as the Kautskys in the wild history of the NBL. This season would see the NBL cut down the number of available teams in their league from thirteen official teams to eight official teams in order to increase the quality of both the playing and competition at hand in the league, with both the Eastern and Western Division (which the Kautskys still represented) now each having four teams in each division instead following the removal of six failed teams from the previous season (alongside the moving of the Whiting Ciesar All-Americans to nearby Hammond, Indiana to become the Hammond Ciesar All-Americans) and the late inclusion of only the Sheboygan Red Skins in the Western Division. That plan would prove to work out very successfully for the NBL, as outside of a later team change in the season for the Warren Penns moving from Warren, Pennsylvania to Cleveland, Ohio to become the Cleveland White Horses, they would see an improved level of production in quality play throughout the league in the process, with only one team in the Pittsburgh Pirates NBL team wanting to fold operations by the end of the season this time around (which would be notable in an era where both team and league foldings were relatively common at the time). This season also saw team owner Frank Kautsky resign as the head coach of the team, with the position being replaced by Bob Nipper for the season.

The Kautskys would end up seeing their best success as a franchise during their original run in the NBL, as they would finish the season with a 13–13 record and be behind the Oshkosh All-Stars for the best record in the Western Division. Unfortunately for the Kautskys, the NBL this season would not utilize a playoff system where the two best teams in each division competed against each other for a shot at the championship (due in part to how the Eastern Division unfolded this season) and instead revolved around only the best two teams in each division (those being the Akron Firestone Non-Skids and aforementioned Oshkosh All-Stars) doing a best of five series for the NBL championship (which was the only time the NBL ever would allow for such a thing), meaning the Kautskys were forcefully eliminated from playoff contention this season by default (alongside either the Akron Goodyear Wingfoots or Warren Penns turned Cleveland White Horses in the Eastern Division). Had this season utilized the NBL Playoffs properly like any other NBL season had done, the Kautskys would have automatically qualified for the NBL Playoffs due to them having the second-best record in the Western Division this season, where they would have gone up against the Oshkosh All-Stars (and likely lost to them anyways).

This season would be notable for being the last professional basketball season that John Wooden would play as a player properly, as Wooden decided to return to the Kautskys after playing a few games with the Hammond Ciesar All-Americans earlier this season due to payment disputes with the Ciesar All-Americans' franchise owner before later retiring as a player to focus more on the world of education (and later become a college basketball head coach for UCLA). However, Wooden wouldn't receive any honors from the NBL this season, as those would go out to John Sines for being a part of the All-NBL First Team and rookie Jewell Young, who would not only be named a member of the All-NBL Second Team, but also be named the NBL's Rookie of the Year (the franchise's second straight Rookie of the Year winner in a row) as well.

== Roster ==
1938–39 Indianapolis Kautskys roster
Players

Pos.	No.	Player	Height	Weight	DOB	From
F/C		Merle Alexander	6 ft 6 in (1.98 m)	185 lb (84 kg)	1907–09–02	Franklin (IN)
G/F		Carl Anderson	6 ft 3 in (1.91 m)	215 lb (98 kg)	1913–11–16	USC
G/F		Frank Baird	5 ft 11 in (1.80 m)	160 lb (73 kg)	1912–04–10	Butler
F/C		Jim Birr	6 ft 3 in (1.91 m)	215 lb (98 kg)	1916–08–22	Indiana
G		Glynn Downey	6 ft 0 in (1.83 m)	180 lb (82 kg)	1915–09–01	Purdue
F		Vern Huffman	6 ft 2 in (1.88 m)	215 lb (98 kg)	1914–12–18	Indiana
G		Bob Phillips	5 ft 11 in (1.80 m)	165 lb (75 kg)	1917–04–08	Michigan State
F		Lowis Proctor	6 ft 2 in (1.88 m)	230 lb (104 kg)	1914–10–02	Bainbridge College?
G		Rex Rudicel	5 ft 5 in (1.65 m)	150 lb (68 kg)	1912–09–06	Ball State
C		Herm Schuessler	6 ft 8 in (2.03 m)	210 lb (95 kg)	1914–07–20	Lafayette HS (IN)
G/F		John Sines	6 ft 1 in (1.85 m)	190 lb (86 kg)	1914–08–13	Purdue
G		Everett Swank	5 ft 11 in (1.80 m)	165 lb (75 kg)	1913–02–17	Indianapolis
C		Earl Thomas	6 ft 4 in (1.93 m)	205 lb (93 kg)	1915–09–22	Ohio State
C		Dave Williams	6 ft 3 in (1.91 m)	210 lb (95 kg)	1913–02–17	Indianapolis
G		John Wooden	5 ft 10 in (1.78 m)	183 lb (83 kg)	1910–10–14	Purdue
G/F		Jewell Young	6 ft 0 in (1.83 m)	160 lb (73 kg)	1913–01–18	Purdue

Coaches
Head coach
- Bob Nipper

Legend
- (DP) Unsigned draft pick
- (FA) Free agent
- (S) Suspended
- Injured

Roster

== Regular season ==
=== Season standings ===
Pos.	Western Division	Wins	Losses	Win %
1	Oshkosh All-Stars	17	11	.607
2	Indianapolis Kautskys	13	13	.500
3	Sheboygan Red Skins	11	17	.393
4	Hammond Ciesar All-Americans	4	24	.143

=== NBL Schedule ===
- November 28, 1938 @ Indianapolis, IN: Akron Goodyear Wingfoots 25, Indianapolis Kautskys 40
- December 3, 1938 @ Akron, OH: Indianapolis Kautskys 37, Akron Goodyear Wingfoots 42
- December 5, 1938 @ Indianapolis, IN: Akron Firestone Non-Skids 39, Indianapolis Kautskys 34
- December 12, 1938 @ Indianapolis, IN: Warren Penns 37, Indianapolis Kautskys 39
- December 13, 1938 @ Warren, PA: Indianapolis Kautskys 41, Warren Penns 43
- December 25, 1938 @ Hammond, IN: Indianapolis Kautskys 44, Hammond Ciesar All-Americans 33
- December 28, 1938 @ Sheboygan, WI: Indianapolis Kautskys 42, Sheboygan Red Skins 45
- December 29, 1938 @ Oshkosh, WI: Indianapolis Kautskys 51, Oshkosh All-Stars 46
- January 2, 1939 @ Indianapolis, IN: Sheboygan Red Skins 38, Indianapolis Kautskys 52
- January 4, 1939 @ Pittsburgh, PA: Indianapolis Kautskys 34, Pittsburgh PIrates 36
- January 5, 1939 @ Warren, PA: Indianapolis Kautskys 47, Warren Penns 48
- January 16, 1939 @ Crawfordsville, IN: Sheboygan Red Skins 34, Indianapolis Kautskys 41
- January 21, 1939 @ Pittsburgh, PA: Indianapolis Kautskys 42, Pittsburgh PIrates 43
- January 23, 1939 @ Indianapolis, IN: Oshkosh All-Stars 24, Indianapolis Kautskys 25
- January 26, 1939 @ Frankfort, IN: Indianapolis Kautskys 60, Hammond Ciesar All-Americans 53
- January 30, 1939 @ Indianapolis, IN: Pittsburgh PIrates 38, Indianapolis Kautskys 40
- February 4, 1939 @ Oshkosh, WI: Indianapolis Kautskys 45, Oshkosh All-Stars 57
- February 5, 1939 @ Hammond, IN: Indianapolis Kautskys 39, Hammond Ciesar All-Americans 44
- February 11, 1939: Indianapolis Kautskys 51, Akron Goodyear Wingfoots 50 (OT @ Akron, OH)
- February 12, 1939 @ Akron, OH: Indianapolis Kautskys 48, Akron Firestone Non-Skids 68
- February 13, 1939 @ Indianapolis, IN: Oshkosh All-Stars 47, Indianapolis Kautskys 25
- February 16, 1939 @ Rushville, IN: Akron Goodyear Wingfoots 48, Indianapolis Kautskys 52
- February 20, 1939 @ Indianapolis, IN: Akron Firestone Non-Skids 64, Indianapolis Kautskys 40
- February 25, 1939 @ Sheboygan WI: Indianapolis Kautskys 39, Sheboygan Red Skins 47
- March 6, 1939 @ Indianapolis, IN: Hammond Ciesar All-Americans 32, Indianapolis Kautskys 43
- March 9, 1939 @ Cleveland, OH: Indianapolis Kautskys 72, Cleveland White Horses 52

The Indianapolis Kautskys had intended to play two different games this season against the Akron Firestone Non-Skids and Pittsburgh Pirates, with their match against Pittsburgh being at home in Indianapolis, Indiana and their match against the Firestone squad being on the road in Akron, Ohio. However, because of weather issues involved in both locations, those games were eventually delayed before ultimately being cancelled entirely, with neither of those games affecting the final standings' results in a very significant manner, especially due to the NBL Playoffs essentially being the NBL Championship series between the two best teams in each division this season, which were the Akron Firestone Non-Skids in the Eastern Division and the Oshkosh All-Stars in the Western Division.

== Awards and honors ==
- First Team All-NBL – John Sines
- Second Team All-NBL – Jewell Young
- NBL Rookie of the Year – Jewell Young
