= Frank Zummach =

American basketball player and coach

- Photo from The Sheboygan Press

Personal information
- Born: January 28, 1911 Milwaukee, Wisconsin, U.S.
- Died: April 30, 2012 (aged 101) Sheboygan, Wisconsin, U.S.
- Listed height: 5 ft 10 in (1.78 m)

Career information
- High school: Marquette University HS (Milwaukee, Wisconsin)
- College: Marquette (1930–1933)

Career history

Coaching
- 1933–1939: Marquette (assistant)
- 1939–1942: Sheboygan Red Skins

Francis E. Zummach (January 28, 1911 – April 30, 2012) was an American basketball player and coach. He served as the head coach of the Sheboygan Red Skins, a team that played in the National Basketball League (NBL) and later the National Basketball Association (NBA), from 1939 to 1942. In 1940–41, the Red Skins made it to the NBL Finals before losing the series 3 games to 0 to the Oshkosh All-Stars. Zummach lived to become a centenarian and died when he was 101 years old.

== Playing career ==
Zummach was born and raised in Milwaukee, Wisconsin and was a standout multi-sport athlete at Marquette University High School. He enrolled at Marquette University in 1929 but did not play basketball, his strongest sport, as a freshman. In fact, he had never planned to play in college, but when he became eligible to compete in 1930–31 as a sophomore, the team needed bodies and Zummach was given the opportunity to play. New head coach Bill Chandler did not play him in the first four games of the season, but Zummach played the final three quarters in a game against the University of Wisconsin—Marquette's rival—and helped the team to a 16–14 upset win. From then on he became part of the regular rotation, and prior to his junior season in 1931–32 he was given an athletic scholarship to remain on the team.

After his junior season in which Marquette finished 11–8, the team had a breakthrough year in Zummach's senior season. He anchored a defense that propelled the Golden Eagles to a 14–3 record, including wins over Notre Dame, Michigan State, Detroit, and Indiana. Although Zummach did not score much, his intangible skills greatly contributed to the team's success. Marquette's men's basketball team registered eight straight losing seasons prior to Zummach and head coach Chandler's arrival, and in their first three seasons together led the Golden Eagles to consecutive winning seasons.

== Coaching career ==
Frank Zummach enrolled at the Marquette University Law School in 1933 after finishing his undergraduate studies the year before. Coach Chandler insisted that Zummach become an assistant coach, and thus in 1933–34 he became Marquette's first-ever paid assistant men's basketball coach. He stayed as an assistant through the 1938–39 season. Other than the 1939–40 season, Zummach played for or coached Marquette basketball throughout the entire 1930s, one which saw the program have a 63% overall win percentage.

On September 6, 1939, Zummach was officially appointed as the new head coach of the Sheboygan Red Skins, then of the NBL. At the time, the NBL was considered the premier professional basketball league in the country. He moved his law firm to Sheboygan, Wisconsin, and took over a franchise that had struggled to an 11–17 record the year before.

In his first season as coach, the Red Skins tied the Oshkosh All-Stars for first place in the Western Division. They went on to lose to the All-Stars in the Western Division championship series two games to one. The next year, Sheboygan advanced to the championship series, again against Oshkosh, but lost in the NBL Finals three games to zero. In 1941–42, Zummach's final year as head coach, the Red Skins mustered just a 10–14 record. After the season, Zummach stepped down as coach "because of a dispute with business manager Carl Roth over Roth's insistence on paying rookie Kenny Buehler a greater salary than veterans Eddie Dancker, Rube Lautenschlager and Kenny Suesens," according to The Oregonian sports writer Brian Gaynor. The Red Skins, under the direction of new head coach Carl Roth, won the NBL championship in 1942–43.

== Later life ==
After coaching the Red Skins, Zummach concentrated on his legal career as one of the partners at Wolters & Zummach. He stayed active in the Wisconsin Bar Association, the St. Clement Catholic Parish, the Knights of Columbus, and also raised a family with his high school sweetheart. When he died on Monday, April 30, Zummach was 101 years old and the oldest living Marquette basketball alumnus. He was survived by his two children, eight grandchildren, and 23 great-grandchildren.
