= Kieran Crowley (disambiguation) =

Kieran Crowley (born 1961) is a New Zealand rugby union coach and former rugby union player.

Kieran Crowley can also refer to:

- Kieran Crowley (basketball) (1916–1975), American professional basketball player
- Kieran Crowley (writer) (1949–2016), American journalist and writer
