= Grauman =

Grauman or Graumann is a surname. Notable people with the surname include:

- Dieter Graumann (born 1950), Israeli-German jurist and economist
- Johann Philipp Graumann (1706–1762), Prussian business mathematician and monetary theorist
- Sid Grauman (1879–1950), American showman
  - Grauman's Chinese Theatre, a movie theater in Hollywood, named after Sid Grauman
  - Grauman's Egyptian Theatre, a movie theater in Hollywood, named after Sid Grauman
- Walter Grauman (1922–2015), American director of stage shows, theatrical films and television shows
- Walter Grauman (basketball) (1915–2000), American basketball player
