= Ralph Amsden =

American basketball player (1917–1988)

Personal information
- Born: January 1, 1917 Chicago, Illinois, U.S.
- Died: November 2, 1988 (aged 71) Pontiac, Michigan, U.S.
- Listed height: 6 ft 4 in (1.93 m)
- Listed weight: 200 lb (91 kg)

Career information
- High school: Oak Park and River Forest (Oak Park, Illinois)
- College: Marquette (1937–1940)
- Position: Center

Career history
- 1940–1942: Sheboygan Red Skins

Ralph Osburn Amsden Jr. (January 1, 1917 – November 2, 1988) was an American professional basketball player. He played for the Sheboygan Red Skins in the National Basketball League and averaged 2.2 points per game.
