= Vince Oliver =

American basketball and football player (1915–1985)

Personal information
- Born: December 28, 1915 Whiting, Indiana, U.S.
- Died: August 28, 1985 (aged 69) Chicago, Illinois, U.S.
- Listed height: 5 ft 11 in (1.80 m)
- Listed weight: 180 lb (82 kg)

Career information
- High school: Whiting (Whiting, Indiana)
- College: Indiana (1938–1940)
- Playing career: 1938–1940
- Position: Guard
- Coaching career: 1946–1967

Career history

Playing
- 1938: Hammond Ciesar All-Americans
- 1939–1940: Hammond McNamara Five

Coaching
- 1946–1948: Thornton HS
- 1948–1954: De La Salle Institute
- 1954–1957: Loyola Academy
- 1964–1967: Whiting HS

Vincent James Oliver (December 28, 1915 – August 28, 1985) was an American professional basketball and football player. He played in the National Basketball League for the Hammond Ciesar All-Americans in five games during the 1938–39 season. Oliver scored two total points. During the 1945 NFL season, Oliver was a back-up quarterback for the Chicago Cardinals. In three games, including one start, he threw four completions in ten attempts.
