= School City of Whiting =

School district in Indiana, United States

Coordinates: 41°40′40″N 87°29′42″W

Address
- 1500 Center St Whiting, Lake County, Indiana; United States

District information
- Superintendent: David Verta
- Schools: 3
- NCES District ID: 1813200

Students and staff
- Students: 1,083
- Teachers: 66 FTE
- Student–teacher ratio: 16.41:1

Other information
- Website: www.whiting.k12.in.us

School City of Whiting is a school district headquartered in Whiting, Indiana, United States. The district serves Whiting.

== School uniforms ==
All Whiting schools require their students to wear school uniforms.

== Schools ==
The district includes three schools: Nathan Hale Elementary School, Whiting Middle School, and Whiting High School.
