= Luther Harris =

American basketball player (1923–1986)

Personal information
- Born: August 27, 1923 Illinois
- Died: February 3, 1986 (aged 62) Cottage Hills, Illinois
- Listed height: 6 ft 3 in (1.91 m)
- Listed weight: 195 lb (88 kg)

Career information
- High school: East Alton–Wood River (Wood River, Illinois)
- Position: Guard / forward

Career history
- 1946–1947: Sheboygan Red Skins
- 1947–1949: Tri-Cities Blackhawks
- 1949–1950: Wood River Standard Oilers

Luther V. Harris Jr. (August 27, 1923 – February 3, 1986) was an American professional basketball player. He played in the National Basketball League for the Sheboygan Red Skins and Tri-Cities Blackhawks and averaged 6.7 points per game.
