= Marv Colen =

American basketball player (1915–1989)

Personal information
- Born: March 8, 1915 Chicago, Illinois, U.S.
- Died: May 14, 1989 (aged 74) Aurora, Colorado, U.S.
- Listed height: 6 ft 0 in (1.83 m)
- Listed weight: 170 lb (77 kg)

Career information
- High school: Roosevelt (Chicago, Illinois)
- College: Loyola Chicago (1934–1937)
- Position: Guard

Career history
- 1937–1938: Chicago Duffy Florals
- 1938–1939: Chicago Rands
- 1939: Chicago Bruins
- 1940: Sheboygan Red Skins

Career highlights
- Second-team All-American – Converse (1937)

Marvin Wilmer Colen (March 8, 1915 – May 14, 1989) was an American professional basketball player. He played for the Chicago Bruins (one game) and Sheboygan Red Skins (five games) in the National Basketball League during the 1939–40 season and averaged 1.0 points per game.
