= Steve Fowdy =

American basketball player

Personal information
- Born: September 16, 1915 Whiting, Indiana
- Died: January 23, 1995 (aged 79) Munster, Indiana
- Listed height: 6 ft 2 in (1.88 m)
- Listed weight: 180 lb (82 kg)

Career information
- High school: Whiting (Whiting, Indiana)
- Position: Forward

Career history
- 1938: Hammond Ciesar All-Americans

Stephen Bruce Fowdy (September 16, 1915 – January 23, 1995) was an American professional basketball player. He played in the National Basketball League in one game for the Hammond Ciesar All-Americans, yet failed to register a single statistic.
