= Heriberto Seda =

American serial killer (born 1967)

- NYSDOCS mugshot of Seda
- Born: July 31, 1967 (age 59); New York City, New York, U.S.
- Other names: The Brooklyn Sniper; The Copycat Zodiac Killer; Faust; The New York Zodiac Killer
- Convictions: Second degree murder (3 counts); Attempted murder Criminal possession of a weapon
- Penalty: 232 years imprisonment

Details
- Victims: 9 (3 dead, 6 critically wounded)
- Span of crimes: March 8, 1990 – October 2, 1993
- Country: United States
- State: New York
- Date apprehended: June 18, 1996
- Imprisoned at: Clinton Correctional Facility; Dannemora, New York, U.S.

Heriberto "Eddie" Seda (born July 31, 1967), often referred to as The New York Zodiac or The Brooklyn Sniper, is an American serial killer who was active in New York City from 1990 through 1993. He fatally shot three people and wounded six others (four critically) before being caught on June 18, 1996.

Seda is believed to have admired San Francisco's Zodiac Killer for avoiding capture. Police described Seda, a Brooklyn resident, as a recluse obsessed with astrology and death. He was formally charged in the case on June 21, 1996, convicted on June 24, 1998, and sentenced to 232 years imprisonment.

== Crimes ==
Seda attacked people throughout New York City, sending taunting messages to the police and media after each crime. The messages included codes based on international maritime signal flags, which New York Post journalist Kieran Crowley decoded with the assistance of his father-in-law, a veteran of World War II cryptography and signals intelligence.

The killer's letters to police claimed that he was selecting his victims based on their signs of the zodiac and implied he would act only at certain times when specific stars were visible in the night sky. Police consulted a professional astronomer, whose predictions about when the killer would strike proved somewhat accurate. He used an improvised firearm, explaining in his messages that the lack of rifling marks on the bullets would prevent his capture.

New York police considered the possibility that the notorious Zodiac Killer may have relocated to the East Coast and resumed his crimes after two decades of inactivity. In the late 1960s the Zodiac Killer murdered at least five people and injured another two in the San Francisco area. He sent taunting letters and coded messages to local media and was never identified. However, a handwriting analyst and consultation with California authorities ruled out that possibility of the two killers being the same man.

== Capture ==
In March 1994, Seda was arrested for possession of a deadly weapon after police noticed a suspicious bulge in his jacket pocket that concealed one of his zip guns. Police determined that the weapon was not functional, and Seda's public defender got all charges dropped and his arrest record sealed. Seda interpreted this turn of events as an omen proving that he was beyond consequences.

At 26 years of age, Seda was an unemployed high school dropout living with his mother and half-sister. He had been a good high school student but was expelled after bringing a starting pistol to school. He had dropped out rather than attend mandatory counseling sessions to be readmitted to school. He was unemployed and supported by his mother but obtained money by stealing coins from pay phones and vending machines.

Seda was mentally and physically abusive to his teenage half-sister, Gladys "Chachi" Reyes. During a confrontation with her and her boyfriend on June 18, 1996, Seda pulled out a weapon and began threatening the couple. While Reyes' boyfriend hid in the bedroom, she tried to escape through the front door, but Seda shot her in the buttocks. Wounded but not incapacitated, she made her way to her neighbor's apartment where she called the police.

After an hours-long stand-off with the police, Seda gave up his firearms and was arrested.

== Investigation and trial ==
Authorities initially made no connection between Seda's arrest for the family violence incident and the string of unsolved murders. However, he closed his handwritten statement about the family incident with a symbol resembling one written on the taunting letters to the police by the unidentified killer.

From there, police focused on Seda as a suspect. Despite the killer's claim that he could never be linked to the crimes due to the lack of rifling on the improvised guns, police were able to use tool-mark evidence to link Seda to the attacks. Fingerprint evidence was also found, and handwriting analysis determined a strong similarity between Seda's statement and the anonymous letters. Most damning, police found Seda's DNA on one of the stamps that had been used to mail a letter to police.

Seda caused repeated disruptions in court, making outbursts and shouting at the judge.

On June 24, 1998, Seda was convicted by a jury after a six-week trial presided over by the Robert J. Hanophy, Justice of the State Supreme Court for the County of Queens, New York. The case was prosecuted by Assistant District Attorneys Robert J. Masters and Raymond E. Scheer. The prosecution presented testimony of 45 witnesses and introduced 150 pieces of evidence. Seda was represented by court appointed attorneys David A. Bart and John S. Wallenstein. Seda was sentenced to prison for 232 years.

== Victims ==
| Date | Victim | Zodiac Sign | Status | Description |
|---|---|---|---|---|
| March 8, 1990 | Mario Orozco | Pisces | Survived | Shot in the back. The bullet stayed lodged next to his spine. |
| March 29, 1990 | Jermaine Montenesdro | Aries | Survived | Shot in the left torso of his lower body. The bullet went through his liver. |
| May 31, 1990 | Joseph "Joe" Proce | Gemini | Died | Shot in his lower back, hitting his kidney. He survived the attack, but died in the hospital on June 24, 1990. |
| June 19, 1990 | Larry Parham | Gemini | Survived | Shot in the chest. The bullet missed his aorta and exited his body through his right armpit. |
| August 10, 1992 | Patricia Fonti | Leo | Died | Shot twice and then was stabbed over 100 times. |
| June 4, 1993 | James "Jim" Weber | Gemini | Survived | Shot in the buttocks. |
| July 20, 1993 | Joseph DiAcone | Cancer | Died | Shot in the head at close range. |
| October 2, 1993 | Diane Ballard | Libra | Survived | Shot in the neck. The bullet missed vital arteries but lodged against her spine. |
| June 11, 1996 | Gladys Reyes | Gemini | Survived | Shot in the buttocks. |

== Personal life ==
In prison, Seda began a relationship with Synthia-China Blast, a transgender woman who was serving a sentence for a gang-related murder.

== See also ==
- Copycat crime
- List of serial killers in the United States
