= 1937 NCAA Men's Basketball All-Americans =

- Awarded for: 1936–37 NCAA men's basketball season

The consensus 1937 College Basketball All-American team, as determined by aggregating the results of four major All-American teams. To earn "consensus" status, a player must win honors from a majority of the following teams: the Helms Athletic Foundation, Converse, the Omaha World Newspaper, and Madison Square Garden.

== 1937 Consensus All-America team ==
Consensus Team
Player	Class	Team
Jules Bender	Senior	Long Island
Hank Luisetti	Junior	Stanford
John Moir	Junior	Notre Dame
Paul Nowak	Junior	Notre Dame
Jewell Young	Junior	Purdue

== Individual All-America teams ==
All-America Team
All-America Team	First team		Second team		Third team	
All-America Team	Player	School	Player	School	Player	School
Helms	Jules Bender	Long Island	No second or third teams			
Helms	Hank Luisetti	Stanford	No second or third teams			
Helms	John Moir	Notre Dame	No second or third teams			
Helms	Franny Murray	Penn	No second or third teams			
Helms	Paul Nowak	Notre Dame	No second or third teams			
Helms	John O'Brien	Columbia	No second or third teams			
Helms	Fred Pralle	Kansas	No second or third teams			
Helms	Merle Rousey	Oklahoma A&M	No second or third teams			
Helms	Bob Spessard	Washington and Lee	No second or third teams			
Helms	Jewell Young	Purdue	No second or third teams			
Converse	James Babcock	Denver	Marv Colen	Loyola (IL)	Joseph Cavanaugh	Canisius
Converse	Jules Bender	Long Island	Eddie Oram	Southern California	Frank Groves	Kansas State
Converse	Hank Luisetti	Stanford	Chuck Orebaugh	Drake	Martin Rolek	Minnesota
Converse	John Moir	Notre Dame	Bob Spessard	Washington and Lee	Wayne Sparks	Carleton
Converse	Paul Nowak	Notre Dame	John Townsend	Michigan	Jewell Young	Purdue
Omaha World Newspaper	Hank Luisetti	Stanford	Jules Bender	Long Island	No third team	
Omaha World Newspaper	John Moir	Notre Dame	Harry Combes	Illinois	No third team	
Omaha World Newspaper	Ray Noble	Kansas	Glynn Downey	Purdue	No third team	
Omaha World Newspaper	Paul Nowak	Notre Dame	Jack Flemming	Iowa State	No third team	
Omaha World Newspaper	Chuck Orebaugh	Drake	Frank Groves	Kansas State	No third team	
Omaha World Newspaper	Martin Rolek	Minnesota	Ken Gunning	Indiana	No third team	
Omaha World Newspaper	Irving Terjesen	NYU	Willis Orr	Rice	No third team	
Omaha World Newspaper	Jewell Young	Purdue	Bob Parsons	Nebraska	No third team	
Madison Square Garden	Jules Bender	Long Island	No second or third team			
Madison Square Garden	Ed Campion	DePaul	No second or third team			
Madison Square Garden	Tippy Dye	Ohio State	No second or third team			
Madison Square Garden	Hank Luisetti	Stanford	No second or third team			
Madison Square Garden	Paul Nowak	Notre Dame	No second or third team			

== See also ==
- 1936–37 NCAA men's basketball season
