= Eddie Oram =

American basketball player

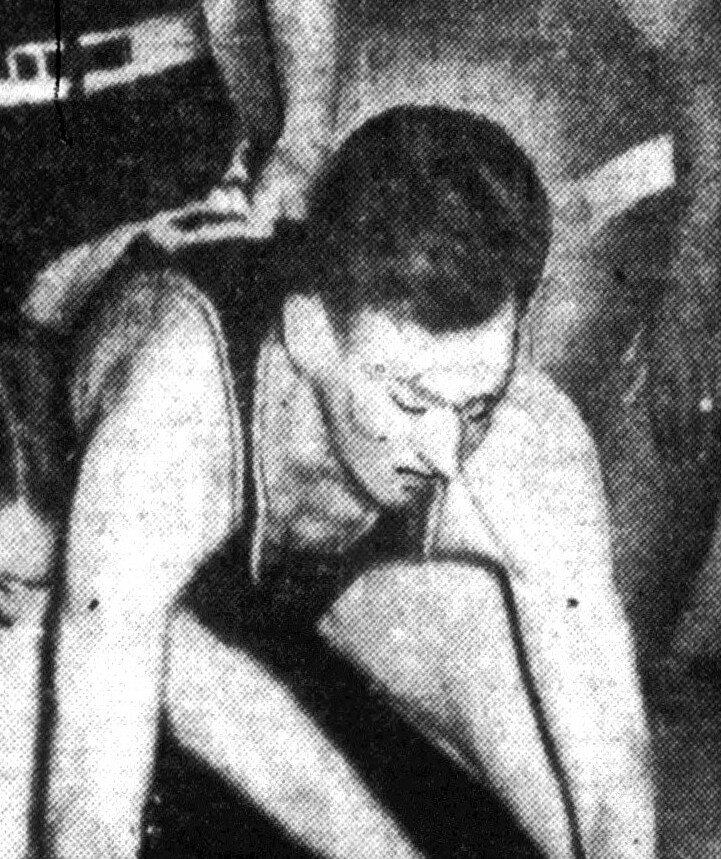
- Oram, circa 1946

Personal information
- Born: October 5, 1914
- Died: December 18, 2004 (aged 90)
- Listed height: 6 ft 3 in (1.91 m)
- Listed weight: 175 lb (79 kg)

Career information
- College: USC (1934–1937)
- Position: Shooting guard / small forward

Career history
- 1939–1940: Chicago Bruins
- 1946–1947: Los Angeles Red Devils
- 1947–1948: Syracuse Nationals

Career highlights
- Second-team All-American – Converse (1937); 2× All-PCC (1936, 1937)

Edwin C. Oram (October 5, 1914 – December 18, 2004) was an American basketball player. He was an All-American college player at the University of Southern California (USC) and an early professional in the National Basketball League (NBL). In 42 NBL contests, Oram averaged 3.8 points per game.
