= Boody Gilbertson =

American basketball player

Personal information
- Born: July 3, 1922 Richland County, Wisconsin
- Died: May 23, 2015 (aged 92) Everett, Washington
- Listed height: 6 ft 3 in (1.91 m)
- Listed weight: 205 lb (93 kg)

Career information
- High school: Everett (Everett, Washington)
- College: Washington (1941–1943, 1946–1947)
- NBA draft: 1947: undrafted
- Playing career: 1947–1949
- Position: Guard / forward

Career history
- 1947–1948: Seattle Athletics
- 1948–1949: Sheboygan Red Skins

Merlin Russell "Boody" Gilbertson (July 3, 1922 – May 23, 2015) was an American professional basketball player who played in the National Basketball League for the Sheboygan Red Skins.
