= Teddy Falda =

American basketball player

Personal information
- Born: January 2, 1920 Whiting, Indiana
- Died: September 7, 1996 (aged 76) West Lafayette, Indiana
- Listed height: 6 ft 0 in (1.83 m)
- Listed weight: 180 lb (82 kg)

Career information
- High school: Whiting (Whiting, Indiana)
- College: Indiana State
- Position: Guard

Career history
- 1938-1939: Hammond Phil Smidt's
- 1939–1940: Hammond McNamara Five
- 1940: St. Adalbert's – Hammond
- 1940-1941: Hammond Ciesar All-Americans
- 1940-1941: Hammond Phil Smidt's
- 1941-1942: Whiting Kampos
- 1941-1942: Whiting
- 1941-1942: Whiting Sinclair Refiners
- 1941-1942: Whiting Peter's Tavern
- 1945-1946: Whiting Stanford Oil
- 1946-1947: Whiting Maypis All-Stars

Theodore Edward Falda (January 2, 1920 – September 7, 1996) was an American professional basketball player. He played in the National Basketball League for the Hammond Ciesar All-Americans in three games and averaged 0.7 points per game.

A U.S. Army veteran, his basketball career was interrupted by World War II.
