= Eddie Kolar =

American basketball player

Personal information
- Born: April 30, 1909 Chicago, Illinois
- Died: March 5, 1988 (aged 78) Bartlett, Illinois
- Listed height: 5 ft 10 in (1.78 m)
- Listed weight: 170 lb (77 kg)

Career information
- High school: J. Sterling Morton (Cicero, Illinois)
- Playing career: 1932–1943
- Position: Guard

Career history

Playing
- 1932–1935: House of David
- 1935–1936: Cicero Elks
- 1935–1940: Chicago Duffy Florals
- 1939: Sheboygan Red Skins
- 1940–1941: Chicago Pepsi Cola

Coaching
- 1942–1943: Clintonville Truckers Wisconsin

Edward Frank Kolar (April 30, 1909 – March 5, 1988) was an American professional basketball player. He played for the Sheboygan Red Skins in the National Basketball League for one game during the 1938–39 season.

He was the brother of Otto Kolar, who played alongside him during Eddie's one game stint for the Red Skins.
