= Bob Spessard =

American basketball player and coach (1915–1989)

Personal information
- Born: December 11, 1915 Roanoke, Virginia, U.S.
- Died: July 26, 1989 (aged 73) Floyd, Virginia, U.S.
- Listed height: 6 ft 7 in (2.01 m)

Career information
- High school: Jefferson (Roanoke, Virginia)
- College: Washington and Lee (1935–1938)
- Position: Center

Career history

Coaching
- 1948–1949: Washington and Lee

Career highlights
- First-team All-American – Helms (1937); 2× Second-team All-American – Converse (1937, 1938); 3× First-team All-SoCon (1936–1938); 3× All-Virginia team (1936–1938)

Robert Woods Spessard (December 11, 1915 – July 26, 1989) was an American basketball player known for his collegiate career at Washington and Lee University in the 1930s. He was a two-time NCAA All-American in 1937 and 1938 as well as a three-time first-team all-Southern Conference choice from 1936 to 1938.

He also coached his alma mater for the 1948–49 season, compiling a 10–12 record in his lone season.
