= Kieran Crowley (basketball) =

American basketball player

Personal information
- Born: June 7, 1916 Chicago, Illinois, U.S.
- Died: January 5, 1975 (aged 58) Chicago, Illinois, U.S.
- Listed height: 5 ft 8 in (1.73 m)
- Listed weight: 155 lb (70 kg)

Career information
- College: DePaul (1935–1938)
- Position: Guard

Career history
- 1938: Sheboygan Red Skins
- 1940–1941: Chicago Pepsi Cola

Kieran Joseph Crowley (June 7, 1916 – January 5, 1975), sometimes misspelled as Kiernan Crowley, was an American professional basketball player. He played for the Sheboygan Red Skins in the National Basketball League in five games during the 1938–39 season and averaged 2.0 points per game.
