= Jack Phelan (basketball, born 1925) =

American basketball player (1925–2021)

Personal information
- Born: November 6, 1925 Chicago, Illinois, U.S.
- Died: March 20, 2021 (aged 95) Bradenton, Florida, U.S.
- Listed height: 6 ft 5 in (1.96 m)
- Listed weight: 195 lb (88 kg)

Career information
- College: DePaul (1945–1949)
- Playing career: 1949–1950
- Position: Forward
- Number: 9, 12

Career history
- 1949: Waterloo Hawks
- 1949–1950: Sheboygan Red Skins

Career statistics
- Points: 226
- Assists: 57
- Stats at NBA.com
- Stats at Basketball Reference

John Edward Phelan (November 6, 1925 – March 20, 2021) was an American basketball player who was a forward in the National Basketball Association (NBA). He played with the Waterloo Hawks and Sheboygan Red Skins during the 1949-50 NBA season.

== Career ==
Phelan played for the DePaul University Blue Demons from 1943 to 1945, playing on the 1945 NIT Championship team before enlisting in the Navy. He returned to the team from 1947 to 1949, playing forward and back-up center to the man voted the best basketball player of 1900–1950, George Mikan. Mikan had a scar on his elbow made by teeth he knocked out of Jack's mouth in a practice the day they left for the NIT Tournament. Jack played part-time from 1951 to 1955 as a fill-in player against the Harlem Globetrotters. They were variously billed as the Chicago Majors, the Philadelphia Sphas, the Boston Whirlwinds, the KC Monarchs, and the House of David, among other names.

Phelan went on to a career as a salesman and manager with the Nalco Chemical Company. He then settled in Bradenton, Florida, where he died on March 20, 2021.

== Career statistics ==
Legend
GP	Games played	GS	Games started	MPG	Minutes per game
FG%	Field goal percentage	3P%	3-point field goal percentage	FT%	Free throw percentage
RPG	Rebounds per game	APG	Assists per game	SPG	Steals per game
BPG	Blocks per game	PPG	Points per game	**Bold**	Career high

=== NBA ===
==== Regular season ====
Year	Team	GP	FG%	FT%	APG	PPG
1949–50	Waterloo	15	**.348**	.542	**1.1**	**4.1**
1949–50	Sheboygan	**40**	.317	**.591**	1.0	**4.1**
Career		55	.325	.578	1.0	4.1

==== Playoffs ====
Year	Team	GP	FG%	FT%	APG	PPG
1950	Sheboygan	3	.400	.667	1.0	3.3
