= Bill Sumerix =

American basketball player

Personal information
- Born: February 11, 1912 Akron, Ohio, U.S.
- Died: February 27, 1978 (aged 66) Jenkintown, Pennsylvania, U.S.

Career information
- High school: Garfield (Akron, Ohio)
- Playing career: 1932–1941
- Position: Guard

Career history
- 1932–1933: Woolcock Plumbers
- 1933–1934: Akron General Tires
- 1936–1937: Akron Backers Jewelers
- 1941: Hammond Ciesar All-Americans

William Henry Sumerix (February 11, 1912 – February 27, 1978), often misnamed "Bill Summers" in sports publications, was an American professional basketball player. He played in the National Basketball League for the Hammond Ciesar All-Americans in one game during the 1940–41 season and scored two points.
