= Sparky Adams (basketball) =

American basketball player (1917–2011)

Personal information
- Born: April 4, 1917 Carpentersville, Illinois, U.S.
- Died: March 31, 2011 (aged 93) Newberry, South Carolina, U.S.
- Listed height: 6 ft 1 in (1.85 m)
- Listed weight: 185 lb (84 kg)

Career information
- High school: Dundee-Crown (Carpentersville, Illinois)
- College: Marquette (1936–1939)
- Position: Forward

Career history
- 1938–1940: Sheboygan Red Skins

Glenn Reed "Sparky" Adams Jr. (April 4, 1917 – March 31, 2011) was an American professional basketball player. He played for the Sheboygan Red Skins in the National Basketball League for two seasons and averaged 4.7 points per game. In his post-basketball career, Adams embarked on a 35-year career with the U.S. Immigration and Naturalization Service.
