= Slim Lonsdorf =

American basketball player (1905–1987)

Personal information
- Born: March 22, 1905 Manitowoc, Wisconsin
- Died: December 10, 1987 (aged 82) Sheboygan, Wisconsin
- Listed height: 6 ft 4 in (1.93 m)

Career information
- Playing career: 1926–1940
- Position: Forward / center

Career history
- 1926–1932: Kohler Recreationists
- 1932–1933: Sheboygan
- 1923–1935: Sheboygan Ballhorns
- 1935–1936: Sheboygan Imigs
- 1936–1937: Sheboygan
- 1937–1938: Sheboygan Enzo Jels
- 1938–1940: Sheboygan Red Skins

Charles Joseph "Slim" Lonsdorf (March 22, 1905 – December 10, 1987) was an American professional basketball player. He played for the Sheboygan Red Skins in the National Basketball League during the 1938–39 season.
