= Stan Zadel =

American basketball player (1916–1982)

Personal information
- Born: April 8, 1916
- Died: October 21, 1982 (aged 66)
- Position: Forward / center

Career history
- 1938–1939: Sheboygan Red Skins
- 1939–1940: Chicago Bruins
- Stats at Basketball Reference

Stanley Zadel (April 8, 1916 – October 21, 1982) was a professional basketball player. He played in the National Basketball League for the Sheboygan Red Skins for ten games in one season, then played for the Chicago Bruins in 18 games the following season. In 28 career games, he averaged 5.0 points per game.
