= Kieran Crowley (writer) =

American novelist (1949–2016)

- Born: April 27, 1949
- Died: March 13, 2016 (aged 66)
- Occupations: Journalist, writer
- Writing career
- Genre: True crime

Kieran Crowley (1949–2016) was an American journalist and New York Times best-selling writer.

He was a longtime contributor at the New York Post, specializing in crime reporting. While at the Post, he decoded messages that were sent to the police by a serial killer later identified as Heriberto Seda. He earned a lifetime achievement award in 2014 from the Press Club of Long Island.

Crowley also wrote true crime books and novels, notably a series starring F.X. Shepard, a tabloid news reporter.

He died at the age of 66 from leukemia complications.

== Bibliography ==
Non-fiction

- Sleep My Little Dead: The True Story of the Zodiac Killer (1997, St. Martin's); about murderer Heriberto Seda
- Burned Alive (1999, St. Martin's)
- The Surgeon's Wife (2001, St. Martin's); about murderer Robert Bierenbaum; a New York Times best-seller.
- Almost Paradise (2005, St. Martin's); about murder victim Ted Ammon

Fiction

- 1787 (2008, Five Star), under the pen name Sean Michael Bailey
- Hack: An F.X. Shepard novel (2015, Titan Books)
- Shoot: An F.X. Shepherd novel (2016, Titan Books)
