= Tom O'Toole (basketball, born 1913) =

American basketball player

Personal information
- Born: May 14, 1913 Akron, Ohio, U.S.
- Died: July 28, 1983 (aged 70) Sun City, Arizona, U.S.

Career information
- Playing career: 1932–1941
- Position: Center

Career history
- 1932–1933: Jack's Service – Akron
- 1934–1935: Akron Coals
- 1936–1937: Akron Backers Jewelers
- 1939–1940: Monco – Akron
- 1939–1940: Akron Knights of Columbus
- 1941: Hammond Ciesar All-Americans

Thomas Patrick O'Toole II (May 14, 1913 – July 28, 1983) was an American professional basketball player. He played in the National Basketball League for the Hammond Ciesar All-Americans in one game during the 1940–41 season but did not score a point.
