= Frank J. Basloe =

Early basketball promoter and important figure in the early development of the game

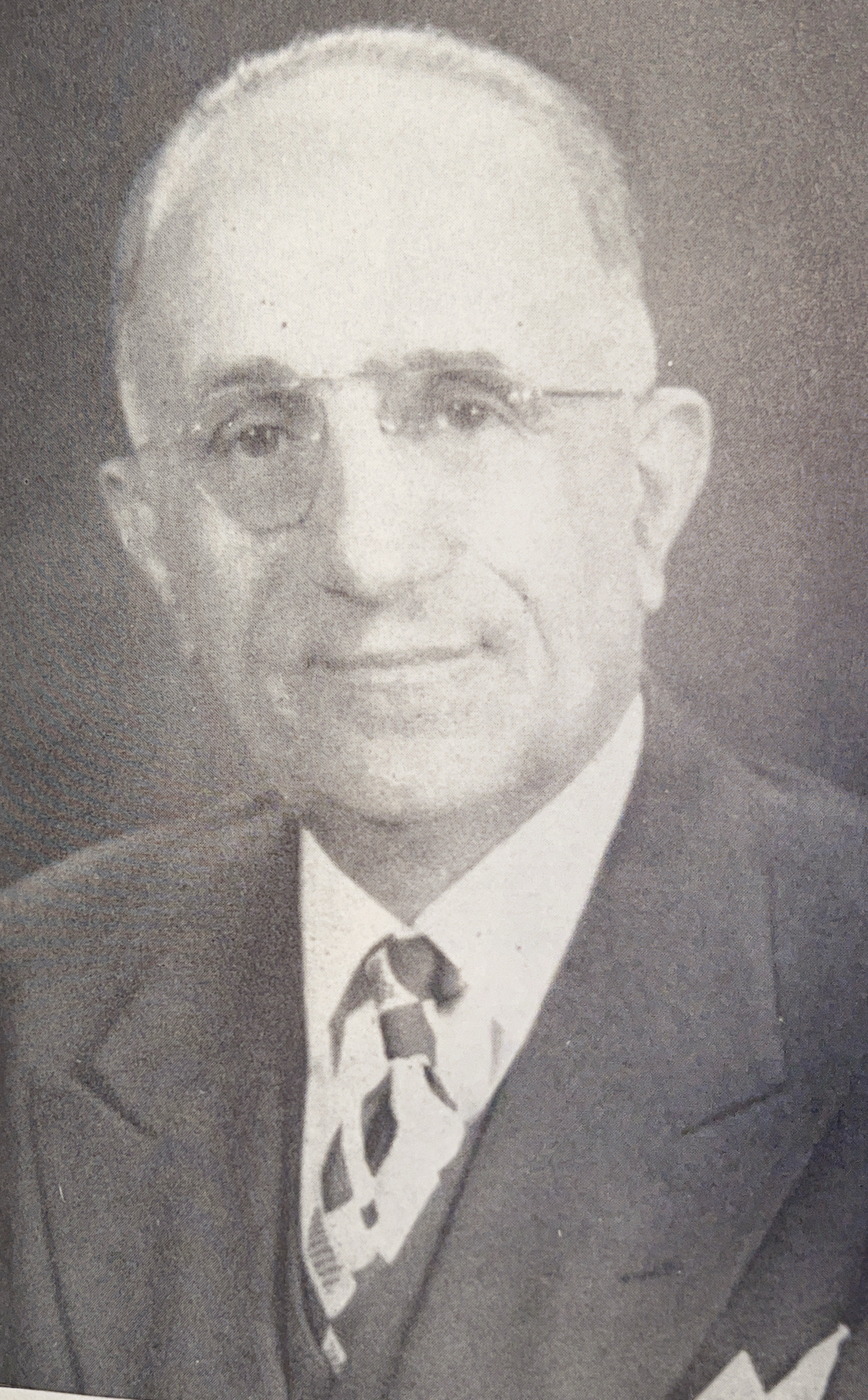
- Born: September 24, 1887; Budapest, Hungary
- Known for: Early basketball development

Frank J. Basloe (‘baes.lou’, September 24, 1887 – December 12, 1966) was a basketball promoter and important figure in the history of basketball. He claims basketball was invented by Lambert Will in Herkimer, New York. The most notable teams under Basloe's ownership were the Basloe Globe Trotters (1903–1923), the 31st Separate Co. of Herkimer (1909–1911), the Oswego Indians (1912–1916), and the Mohawk Indians (1923–1929). He was inducted in the New York State Basketball Hall of Fame for the 2027 class, and is the namesake of the Herkimer public library.

== Early years ==
Basloe was born on September 24, 1887, in Budapest, Hungary. His family immigrated to the United States in 1891, moving to Herkimer, New York. In 1897, at 10 years old, he played his first game of basketball in the barn behind his house with friends and a ball that his mother made out of rags. Around the same time, he and his friends snuck into a game of Herkimer's professional team, the 31st Separate Co. When he was 14 years old, Basloe started to work delivering newspapers, with the goal of selling the most papers and winning a leather basketball; he succeeded to the detriment of his schoolwork that year. He left school after sixth grade, at the age of 16.

== Promoting basketball ==
In 1903, the same year he dropped out of school, Basloe pulled together his first team, which he called Herkimer Team. Their initial nine game barnstorming netted $300. He promoted a variety of teams over the years, and they played throughout New York State, other parts of the Northeast, and the Midwest. Basloe's basketball teams, including the Basloe Globe Trotters, Oswego Indians, and 31st Separate Co., compiled a record of 1,451 games, with 1,324 wins and 127 losses between 1903 and 1923, winning approximately 91% of all games over two decades, making them “the most traveled and successful of the early barnstorming teams.” The 31st Separate Co. defeated the Buffalo Germans, ending a 111-game winning streak on February 22, 1911. The Oswego Indians was the first team to ever defeat the Buffalo Germans on their home court, on January 25, 1914. The Germans were among the most famous of the early basketball teams. Basloe's performances led him to be dubbed "one of the most prominent managers and promoters in early professional basketball."

Basloe's teams typically played 50 to 60 games per season, traveling nearly 95,000 miles over the first two decades of the 20th century, from the East Coast through the Midwest “at a time when most Americans rarely left their home county,” according to sports historian Robert W. Peterson. As a result, Basloe was described as “easily the best ambassador of professional basketball at the time,“ and “[u]ntil the advent of the New York Original Celtics, New York Renaissance, and Harlem Globetrotters in the 1920s, his clubs reigned supreme among barnstormers.”

He served as President (1937–1941) and Commissioner (1947–1948) of the New York State Professional Basketball League.

Beyond basketball, Basloe was a semi-pro baseball player, marathon promoter, prize fight promoter, motorcycle racing enthusiast, and vaudeville comedian.

== Legacy ==
As the author of I Grew Up with Basketball: Twenty Years of Barnstorming with Cage Greats of Yesterday, Basloe provided a historical and autobiographical account of basketball's early years. The book provides an historiography of the origins of basketball, competing with the Naismith hypothesis. Basloe contended the game was developed before Naismith claims, in Herkimer. In the book, Basloe claims Lambert Will invented the game of basketball in the 1891–92 season. When evaluating Basloe's contested historical claims, reviewer Murry Nelson stated "Basloe never let a good story be diminished by the facts." The book provides important historical gloss on early basketball. Murry called the work “one of the most interesting early basketball books ever written.”

Originally published in 1952, the book was republished in 2012 by Nebraska University Press, with an introduction by Michael A. Antonucci, professor of English and American Studies at Keene State University. In his introduction, Antonucci praised the book's “guided tour of basketball's foundations, recognizing its dimensions as a sport and an industry.” He was inducted into the Greater Utica Sports Hall of Fame in 1993 and inducted by the athletic department and Alpha Phi Sigma into the Utica College of Syracuse University (now Utica University) Hall of Fame in 1954 for his contribution to the development of basketball into a national sport. He also received the Colgate University Civic Award during its 1958 Founder's Day Convocation. He was also a Veteran Nominee to the Naismith Basketball Hall of Fame in 2026.

== Personal life ==
Basloe's father, then known as Josef Breslau, came to the United States in 1891 and found work on a railroad in Herkimer, New York. After earning enough money, Breslau brought his son, daughter, and wife to the United States, with help from the Jewish Aid Society (now officially known as HIAS). Breslau changed his name when it was painted on the sign for his store as “Joseph Basloe.”

Frank J. Basloe married Rose Rothblum in 1914. They had four children, Irving, Sheldon, Eleanor, and Leatrice. Basloe lived in Herkimer until his death in 1966. He worked as a real estate agent and insurance adjuster. Basloe donated land for a synagogue which was named in honor of his father (Temple Beth Joseph), a library addition attached to Temple Beth Joseph (Rose Basloe Library) and a playground which was named in honor of his family (Basloe Field). In 1975, his children contributed funds to help the Herkimer Library move to a new building; the library was renamed the Frank J. Basloe library.
