= Splinter Johnson =

American basketball player

Personal information
- Born: June 16, 1920 Frankfort, Indiana, U.S.
- Died: August 6, 2002 (aged 82) Suwannee, Florida, U.S.
- Listed height: 6 ft 3 in (1.91 m)
- Listed weight: 190 lb (86 kg)

Career information
- High school: Frankfort (Frankfort, Indiana)
- Position: Forward / center

Career history
- 1940–1941: Hammond Ciesar All-Americans
- 1941–1942: Frankfort Nickel Plate
- 1946–1947: Frankfort (American Legion)

Charles Robert "Splinter" Johnson (June 16, 1920 – August 6, 2002) was an American professional basketball player. He played in the National Basketball League for the Hammond Ciesar All-Americans during the 1940–41 season and averaged 4.0 points per game.
