= Chet Tollstam =

American basketball player

Personal information
- Born: September 23, 1918 Chicago, Illinois, U.S.
- Died: December 27, 2003 (aged 85) Chicago, Illinois, U.S.
- Listed height: 6 ft 2 in (1.88 m)
- Listed weight: 180 lb (82 kg)

Career information
- High school: Carl Schurz (Chicago, Illinois)
- College: DePaul (1937–1940)
- Position: Forward / center

Career history
- 1940–1941: Hammond Ciesar All-Americans

Karol Chester "Chet" Tollstam (September 23, 1918 – December 27, 2003) was an American professional basketball player. He played in the National Basketball League for the Hammond Ciesar All-Americans during the 1940–41 season and averaged 2.9 points per game.
