= Herm Schuessler =

American basketball player

Personal information
- Born: July 20, 1914 Lafayette, Indiana, U.S.
- Died: July 5, 1997 (aged 82) Lafayette, Indiana, U.S.
- Listed height: 6 ft 8 in (2.03 m)
- Listed weight: 210 lb (95 kg)
- Position: Center

Career history
- 1931–1935: Lafayette Lambs
- 1938–1939: Indianapolis Kautskys

Herman Arthur Schuessler (July 20, 1914 – July 5, 1997) was an American professional basketball player. He played for the Indianapolis Kautskys in the National Basketball League during the 1938–39 season and averaged 3.7 points per game.
