= Bill Wendt =

American basketball player and coach

Personal information
- Born: March 20, 1915 Chicago, Illinois, U.S.
- Died: March 12, 1966 (aged 50) Arlington Heights, Illinois, U.S.
- Listed height: 6 ft 3 in (1.91 m)
- Listed weight: 180 lb (82 kg)

Career information
- High school: DePaul Academy (Chicago, Illinois)
- College: DePaul (1935–1936)
- Position: Forward

Career history

Playing
- 1937–1938: Chicago Demons
- 1938: Hammond Ciesar All-Americans

Coaching
- 1940–1942: DePaul

William Lester Wendt (March 20, 1915 – March 12, 1966) was an American basketball coach and professional player. He was the head coach of DePaul University from 1940 to 1942, guiding them to a 23–20 record. Wendt had played at DePaul during the late 1930s and had a brief professional playing career with the National Basketball League's Hammond Ciesar All-Americans.
