= Bill Behr =

American basketball player

Personal information
- Born: July 7, 1919 Frankfort, Indiana, U.S.
- Died: August 6, 1997 (aged 78) Lebanon, Indiana, U.S.
- Listed height: 6 ft 2 in (1.88 m)
- Listed weight: 190 lb (86 kg)

Career information
- High school: Frankfort (Frankfort, Indiana)
- Position: Guard

Career history
- 1940–1941: Hammond Ciesar All-Americans
- 1941–1942: Frankfort Nickel Plater
- 1946–1947: Frankfort Legionaires

William Leon Behr (July 7, 1919 – August 6, 1997) was an American professional basketball player. He played in the National Basketball League for the Hammond Ciesar All-Americans in 1940–41 and averaged 3.5 points per game.
