= Jim Birr =

American basketball player (1916–2006)

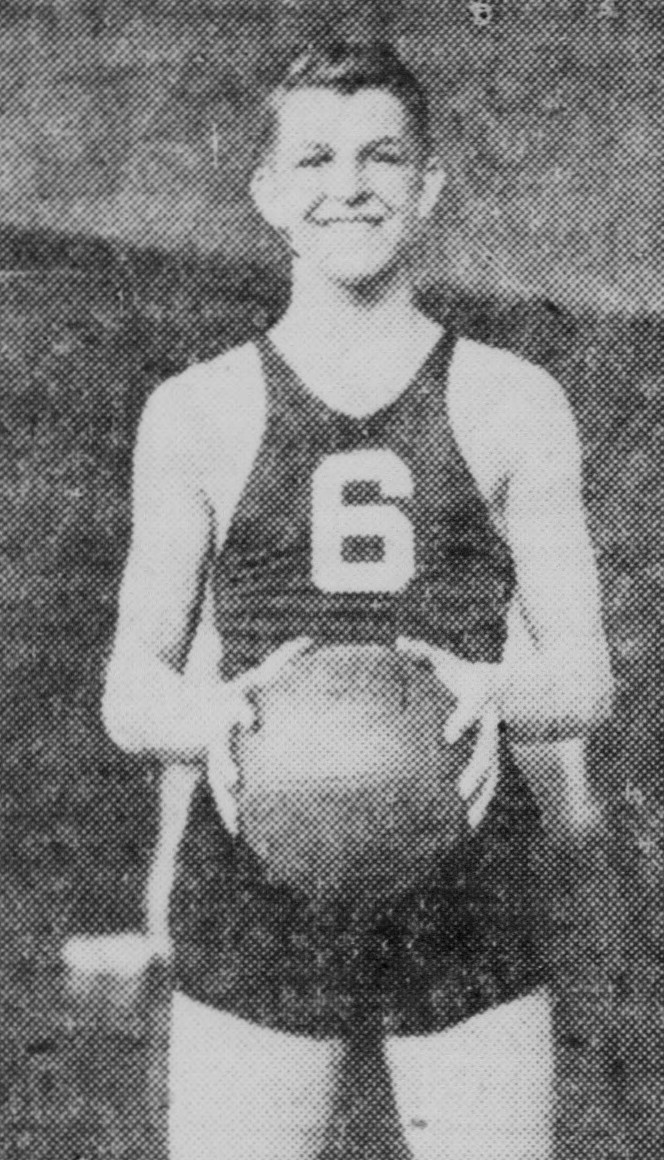
- Birr, circa 1934

Personal information
- Born: August 22, 1916 Indianapolis, Indiana
- Died: June 8, 2006 (aged 89) Naples, Florida
- Listed height: 6 ft 3 in (1.91 m)
- Listed weight: 215 lb (98 kg)

Career information
- High school: Shortridge (Indianapolis, Indiana)
- College: Indiana (1935–1938)
- Position: Forward / center

Career history
- 1938–1941: Indianapolis Kautskys
- 1939–1940: Beard All-Stars
- 1940–1941: Jim Birr All-Stars
- 1945–1946: Indianapolis Kautskys

James Otto Birr (August 22, 1916 – June 8, 2006) was an American professional basketball player. He played for the Indianapolis Kautskys in the National Basketball League and averaged 7.0 points per game. In college, he played on the football and basketball teams for Indiana University. In football he received All-America votes.

Birr was a multi-faceted individual as well. He served in World War II aboard the USS Belleau Wood and received both a Bronze Star and a Purple Heart. He was an original investor in the formation of the New York Titans professional football team (then of the AFL, now known as the New York Jets of the NFL), unsuccessfully ran to become the mayor of Indianapolis, created his own independent basketball team called the Jim Birr All-Stars, and created and published the magazine Movie Digest. Later in life, Birr moved to South Florida and got into real estate development. There, he played a part in the development of the Daytona International Speedway.
