= Ed Campion =

American basketball player (1915–2005)

Personal information
- Born: December 19, 1915 Chicago, Illinois, U.S.
- Died: January 10, 2005 (aged 89) Salinas, California, U.S.

Career information
- High school: St. George (Evanston, Illinois)
- College: DePaul (1934–1937)
- Position: Guard

Career history
- 1937–1939: Whiting/Hammond Ciesar All-Americans

Career highlights
- First-team All-American – MSG (1937)

Edward Campion Sr. (December 19, 1915 – January 10, 2005) was an American basketball player in the United States National Basketball League (NBL). Born and raised in the Chicago area, Campion was an All-American college player for DePaul University in the 1936–37 season. He was also an alternate for the 1936 U.S. Olympic team. Following his college career, Campion played two seasons in the NBL for the Whiting Ciesar All-Americans (who became the Hammond Ciesar All-Americans during his time there), averaging 3.6 points per game. Campion died on January 10, 2005, in Salinas, California.
