= Emil Benko =

American basketball player

Personal information
- Born: November 9, 1913 Whiting, Indiana
- Died: November 14, 2007 (aged 94) East Chicago, Indiana

Career information
- High school: Whiting (Whiting, Indiana)
- Position: Guard

Career history
- 1940: Hammond Ciesar All-Americans

Emil Ludwig Benko (November 9, 1913 – November 14, 2007), sometimes incorrectly listed as "Danko" in sports encyclopedias, was an American professional basketball player. He played in the National Basketball League for the Hammond Ciesar All-Americans in one game and scored four points.

== Early life ==
Benko attended Whiting High School. He served in the United States Army Air Forces during World War II, and was honorably discharged as a staff sergeant on October 23, 1944. He served with the 933rd Engineer Aviation Regiment on Ascension Island March 30, 1942 – February 26, 1944.
