= Robert McElliott =

American basketball player

Personal information
- Born: July 10, 1915 Illinois, U.S.
- Died: February 1, 1975 (aged 59)
- Position: Forward / center

Career history
- 1938: Hammond Ciesar All-Americans

Robert McElliott (July 10, 1915 – February 1, 1975) was an American professional basketball player in the United States' National Basketball League. He played for the Hammond Ciesar All-Americans in five games during the 1938–39 season. He attended St. Viator College.
