= Walter Grauman (basketball) =

American basketball player

Personal information
- Born: June 17, 1915 Sheboygan, Wisconsin
- Died: December 6, 2000 (aged 85) Sheboygan, Wisconsin
- Listed height: 6 ft 2 in (1.88 m)
- Listed weight: 200 lb (91 kg)

Career information
- High school: Sheboygan (Sheboygan, Wisconsin)
- Position: Guard

Career history
- 1933–1934: Rex Theaters
- 1934–1938: Sheboygan Independents
- 1938: Sheboygan Red Skins

Walter William Grauman (June 17, 1915 – December 6, 2000) was an American professional basketball player. He played for the Sheboygan Red Skins in the National Basketball League and appeared in one game during the 1938–39 season.
