= Bob Parsons (basketball) =

American basketball player

Personal information
- Born: June 11, 1915 Lincoln, Nebraska, U.S.
- Died: March 1, 1985 (aged 69) Modesto, California, U.S.
- Listed height: 6 ft 1 in (1.85 m)
- Listed weight: 175 lb (79 kg)

Career information
- High school: Lincoln (Lincoln, Nebraska)
- College: Nebraska (1935–1938)
- Playing career: 1937–1947
- Position: Shooting guard / small forward

Career history
- 1937–1938: Lincoln Woodmen
- 1938–1939: Akron Goodyear Wingfoots
- 1939–1940: Akron
- 1941: Akron Collegians
- 1941–1942: Akron Goodyear Wingfoots
- 1944–1945: Rochester Guards
- 1946–1947: Seattle Blue Devils

Career highlights
- Second-team All-American – OWH (1937)

Robert Clifford Parsons (June 11, 1915 – March 1, 1985) was an American professional basketball player. He played for the Akron Goodyear Wingfoots in the National Basketball League during the 1938–39 and 1941–42 seasons and averaged 2.1 points per game.
