= Glynn Downey =

American basketball player and coach

Personal information
- Born: September 1, 1915 Franklin, Indiana, U.S.
- Died: January 30, 1976 (aged 60) Stuart, Florida, U.S.
- Listed height: 6 ft 0 in (1.83 m)
- Listed weight: 180 lb (82 kg)

Career information
- High school: Michigantown (Michigantown, Indiana)
- College: Purdue (1934–1937)
- Playing career: 1938–1940
- Position: Guard

Career history

Playing
- 1938–1939: Indianapolis Kautskys
- 1939–1940: Hammond Ciesar All-Americans

Coaching
- 1938–1943: Greencastle HS

Career highlights
- Second-team All-American – Omaha World (1937)

Melville Glynn Downey (September 1, 1915 – January 30, 1976) was an American basketball player and coach. He was an All-American college player at Purdue University and played two professional seasons in the National Basketball League (NBL), front-runner to the modern NBA.

Downey played at Purdue from 1934 to 1937, earning second-team All-American honors from the Omaha World. He played the 1938–39 NBL season for the Indianapolis Kautskys and the 1939–40 season for the Hammond Ciesar All-Americans. He averaged 5.1 points per game over 37 NBL contests.

He died on January 30, 1976, at age 60.
