= George Hesik =

American basketball and baseball player

Personal information
- Born: June 15, 1913 Chicago, Illinois, U.S.
- Died: April 18, 1994 (aged 80) Newport Beach, California, U.S.
- Listed height: 6 ft 2 in (1.88 m)
- Listed weight: 195 lb (88 kg)

Career information
- College: Marquette (1937–1939)
- Playing career: 1938–1942
- Position: Forward / center

Career history
- 1938–1939: Akron Goodyear Wingfoots
- 1939–1942: Sheboygan Red Skins

George Joseph Hesik (June 15, 1913 – April 18, 1994) was an American professional basketball and minor league baseball player. In basketball, he played for the Akron Goodyear Wingfoots and Sheboygan Red Skins in the National Basketball League. In baseball, he spent one season playing for the Bakersfield Indians.

Hesik played college baseball and basketball for Marquette University before turning professional. He also served in World War II.
