= Rex Rudicel =

American basketball player

Personal information
- Born: September 6, 1912 Huntington County, Indiana, U.S.
- Died: March 20, 2000 (aged 87) Muncie, Indiana, U.S.
- Listed height: 5 ft 5 in (1.65 m)
- Listed weight: 150 lb (68 kg)

Career information
- High school: Huntington (Huntington, Indiana)
- College: Ball State (1935–1938)
- Position: Guard

Career history

Playing
- 1938: Indianapolis Kautskys

Coaching
- 1938–1943, 1946–1948: Hagerstown HS
- 1948–1969: Burris HS

Rexford Schultz Rudicel (September 6, 1912 – March 20, 2000) was an American professional basketball player. He played for the Indianapolis Kautskys in the National Basketball League during the 1938–39 season but appeared in only three games. He played college basketball and baseball at Ball State University. In his post-professional playing career, Rudicel coached high school basketball from 1938 to 1969.
