= Nick Yost =

American basketball player

Personal information
- Born: April 1, 1915 Chicago, Illinois, U.S.
- Died: December 31, 1980 (aged 65)
- Listed height: 6 ft 4 in (1.93 m)
- Listed weight: 185 lb (84 kg)

Career information
- High school: DePaul Academy (Chicago, Illinois)
- College: DePaul (1934–1937)
- Position: Forward / center

Career history
- 1938–1940: Hammond Ciesar All-Americans

Nicholas Yost (April 1, 1915 – December 31, 1980) was an American basketball player who played in the United States' National Basketball League for two seasons. He played for the Hammond Ciesar All-Americans between 1938 and 1940.

Yost grew up in Chicago, attended DePaul Academy for high school, then lettered in basketball at DePaul University between 1934 and 1937 before turning professional.
