= Clem Ruh =

American basketball player

Personal information
- Born: October 31, 1915 Ohio, U.S.
- Died: October 5, 1973 (aged 57) Studio City, California, U.S.
- Listed height: 5 ft 10 in (1.78 m)
- Listed weight: 165 lb (75 kg)

Career information
- High school: Anderson (Anderson, Indiana)
- College: USC (1936–1939)
- Position: Guard

Career history
- 1940–1941: Hammond Ciesar All-Americans

Clemens W. Ruh (October 31, 1915 – October 5, 1973) was an American professional basketball player. He played in the National Basketball League for the Hammond Ciesar All-Americans during the 1940–41 season and averaged 3.7 points per game.
