= Carl Anderson (basketball) =

American basketball player (1913–2001)

Personal information
- Born: November 16, 1913 Middletown, Indiana, US
- Died: July 30, 2001 (aged 87) Nashville, Tennessee, US
- Listed height: 6 ft 3 in (1.91 m)
- Listed weight: 215 lb (98 kg)

Career information
- High school: Anderson (Anderson, Indiana)
- College: USC (1935–1938)
- Position: Guard
- Coaching career: 1946–1955

Career history

Playing
- 1938: Indianapolis Kautskys
- 1940: Hammond Ciesar All-Americans

Coaching
- 1946-1955: NC State University

Carl Henry "Buttercup" Anderson (November 16, 1913 – July 30, 2001) was an American professional basketball player. He played basketball for the University of Southern California from 1935 to 1939. He played in the National Basketball League for the Indianapolis Kautskys and Hammond Ciesar All-Americans but did not score a single point in five career games. He married Harriett Ann Biggs and had a daughter Kristin Anderson (1940). On October 16, 1940 he joined the US Navy and served in WWII, where he earned a Bronze Star for his heroic actions during the kamikaze bombings at Okinawa.

He returned home, and moved to Raleigh, North Carolina where in 1946 began his coaching career as an assistant coach at NC State University. In 1949, he had a son, Johnnie Leroy Anderson. He coached for NC State until the end of the 1955 season.

In the early '60s, he moved with his family to Nashville, Tennessee. On September 9, 1969, his daughter Kristin was killed in the Allegheny Flight 853 plane crash.
