= Les Kuplic =

American basketball player (1911–1968)

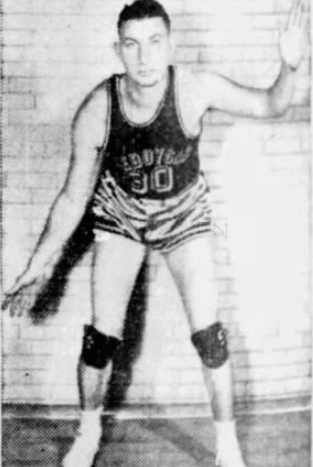
- Kuplic c. 1938

Personal information
- Born: September 23, 1911 Manitowoc, Wisconsin, U.S.
- Died: July 22, 1968 (aged 56) Sheboygan Falls, Wisconsin, U.S.
- Listed height: 6 ft 3 in (1.91 m)
- Listed weight: 200 lb (91 kg)

Career information
- High school: Lincoln (Manitowoc, Wisconsin)
- College: Beloit (1931–1934)
- Position: Forward

Career history

Playing
- 1936–1937: Sheboygan Imigs
- 1937–1938: Sheboygan Enzo Jels
- 1938–1940: Sheboygan Red Skins

Coaching
- 1934–1935: St. Norbert (assistant)

James Leslie Kuplic (September 23, 1911 – July 22, 1968) was an American professional basketball player. He played for the Sheboygan Red Skins in the National Basketball League for two seasons and averaged 1.2 points per game.

After playing football, basketball, and tennis for Beloit College, Kuplic spent the 1934–35 year coaching all three sports at St. Norbert College. He assisted with the football and basketball teams and was the head coach for the tennis team. Kuplic also taught Japanese history while at St. Norbert. He did not enjoy coaching or teaching, so he left to go work in corporate America. During the late 1930s he played on numerous barnstorming teams in Sheboygan, Wisconsin while also officiating high school basketball games.

Kuplic died from a heart attack on his way to work on July 22, 1968.
