= Paul Sokody =

American basketball player

Personal information
- Born: August 18, 1914 Elgin, Illinois, U.S.
- Died: May 12, 1992 (aged 77) Elgin, Illinois, U.S.
- Listed height: 6 ft 2 in (1.88 m)
- Listed weight: 170 lb (77 kg)

Career information
- High school: Elgin (Elgin, Illinois)
- College: Marquette (1935–1938)
- Playing career: 1938–1944
- Position: Forward

Career history
- 1938–1942: Sheboygan Red Skins
- 1942–1943: Chicago Studebaker Flyers
- 1942–1943: Detroit Eagles
- 1943–1944: Chicago Gears
- 1943–1944: Rochester Wings

Paul Sokody Jr. (August 18, 1914 – May 12, 1992) was an American professional basketball player. He played for the Sheboygan Red Skins and Chicago Studebaker Flyers in the National Basketball League for five total seasons, averaging 5.3 points per game for his career.

After basketball, Sokody worked at Hardy Salt Company for 35 years. He also refereed more than 2,000 high school and college basketball games, including Big Ten Conference and Missouri Valley Conference contests.
