= Paul Price (basketball) =

American basketball player

Personal information
- Born: c. 1913
- Position: Forward

Career history
- 1941: Hammond Ciesar All-Americans

Paul Price (born c. 1913) was an American professional basketball player. He played in the National Basketball League for the Hammond Ciesar All-Americans in one game during the 1940–41 season and scored six points.
