= Edwin Schutte =

American basketball coach & dentist (1906-1985)

Personal information
- Born: July 9, 1906
- Died: September 22, 1985 (aged 79)

Career history

Coaching
- 1937–1938: Sheboygan Enzo Gels
- 1938–1939: Sheboygan Red Skins

Edwin H. "Doc" Schutte (July 9, 1906 – September 22, 1985) was an American basketball coach and dentist.

He graduated from Marquette University. Prior to coaching, he was full-time dentist in Sheboygan, Wisconsin.

In 1937–38 he coached the Sheboygan Enzo Gels, a semi-professional basketball team. When local Sheboygan business leaders put together a community team to join the National Basketball League in order to compete with their in-state rival, the Oshkosh All-Stars, they selected Schutte to lead the new team, the Sheboygan Red Skins.

Although the team started the 1938–39 season well, they did not maintain success, finished with an 11–17 record and missed the playoffs. Schutte stepped down from coaching after the first season.
