= Bob Phillips (basketball) =

American basketball player

Personal information
- Born: April 8, 1917 Gary, Indiana, U.S.
- Died: July 21, 1992 (aged 75) Valparaiso, Indiana, U.S.
- Listed height: 5 ft 11 in (1.80 m)
- Listed weight: 165 lb (75 kg)

Career information
- High school: Horace Mann (Gary, Indiana)
- College: Michigan State (1938–1941)
- Position: Guard

Career history
- 1936–1937: Crown Pointe
- 1938: Indianapolis Kautskys

Robert Harris Phillips (April 8, 1917 – July 21, 1992) was an American professional basketball player. He played in one game for the Indianapolis Kautskys in the National Basketball League.
