= Otto Kolar =

American basketball player (1911–1995)

Personal information
- Born: December 6, 1911 Chicago, Illinois, U.S.
- Died: April 10, 1995 (aged 83) Loves Park, Illinois, U.S.
- Listed height: 6 ft 3 in (1.91 m)
- Listed weight: 180 lb (82 kg)

Career information
- High school: J. Sterling Morton (Cicero, Illinois)
- Playing career: 1932–1942
- Position: Guard / forward

Career history
- 1932–1935: House of David
- 1935–1936: Cicero Elks
- 1935–1938: Chicago Duffy Florals
- 1938–1941: Sheboygan Red Skins
- 1941–1942: Chicago Bruins

Career highlights
- All-NBL Second Team (1940)

Otto Joseph Kolar (December 6, 1911 – April 10, 1995) was an American professional basketball player. He played for the Sheboygan Red Skins and Chicago Bruins in the National Basketball League and averaged 5.1 points per game.

He was the brother of Eddie Kolar, who played alongside him for the Red Skins in one game during the 1938–39 season.
