= Rube Lautenschlager =

American basketball player (1915–1992)

Personal information
- Born: September 7, 1915
- Died: January 5, 1992 (aged 76)
- Listed height: 6 ft 2 in (1.88 m)
- Listed weight: 190 lb (86 kg)

Career information
- College: Wisconsin–Oshkosh (1934–1937)
- Position: Forward / guard

Career history
- 1938–1947: Sheboygan Red Skins

Career highlights
- NBL champion (1943); 2× All-NBL Second Team (1940, 1944)

Reuben Lautenschlager (September 7, 1915 – January 5, 1992) was an American professional basketball player. He played for the Sheboygan Red Skins in the National Basketball League from 1938 to 1947. Lautenschlager would end up being the second-longest standing player for the Sheboygan Red Skins franchise behind Ed Dancker, with Lautenschlager staying with the team throughout almost their entire tenure within the NBL before the franchise moved on to the National Basketball Association in 1949, as Lautenschlager retired from playing basketball to become a teacher before the start of the 1947–48 NBL season.
