= Scoop Posewitz =

American basketball player (1908–1993)

Personal information
- Born: September 12, 1908 Sheboygan, Wisconsin, U.S.
- Died: September 25, 1993 (aged 85) Sheboygan, Wisconsin, U.S.
- Listed height: 5 ft 11 in (1.80 m)
- Listed weight: 180 lb (82 kg)

Career information
- Playing career: 1928–1940
- Position: Guard

Career history
- 1928–1929: Sheboygan Merchants
- 1929–1930: Plymouth Recreationals
- 1930–1931: Sheboygan Ballhorns
- 1931: Sheboygan
- 1931–1933: Kohler Recreations
- 1933–1935: Sheboygan Ballhorns
- 1935–1937: Sheboygan Art Imigs
- 1937–1938: Sheboygan Enzo Jels
- 1938–1940: Sheboygan Red Skins

Joseph Charles "Scoop" Posewitz (September 12, 1908 – September 25, 1993) was an American professional basketball player. He played for the Sheboygan Red Skins in the National Basketball League between 1938 and 1940 and averaged 1.7 points per game. He was the brother of professional basketball player Johnny Posewitz.
