= Ken Suesens =

American basketball player and coach

Personal information
- Born: October 23, 1916 Des Moines, Iowa, U.S.
- Died: May 29, 1992 (aged 75) Sheboygan, Wisconsin, U.S.
- Listed height: 6 ft 1 in (1.85 m)
- Listed weight: 175 lb (79 kg)

Career information
- College: Iowa (1935–1938)
- Playing career: 1938–1949
- Position: Guard

Career history

Playing
- 1938–1949: Sheboygan Red Skins

Coaching
- 1948–1951: Sheboygan Red Skins
- 1951–1958: Valparaiso

Career highlights
- NBL champion (1943); 2× All-NBL Second Team (1943, 1944)

Kenneth Glenn Suesens (October 23, 1916 – May 29, 1992) was the head coach of the Sheboygan Red Skins of the National Basketball Association from 1948 to 1951. Under him, they would go 1–2 in the playoffs. He was born in Des Moines, Iowa to John F. Suesens and Martha Duran.

== Head coaching record ==
Legend
Regular season	G	Games coached	W	Games won	L	Games lost	W–L %	Win–loss %
Playoffs	PG	Playoff games	PW	Playoff wins	PL	Playoff losses	PW–L %	Playoff win–loss %

Team	Year	G	W	L	W–L%	Finish	PG	PW	PL	PW–L%	Result
Sheboygan	1949–50	62	22	40	.355	4th in Western	3	1	2	.333	Lost Division semifinals
