= Johnny Posewitz =

American basketball player

Personal information
- Born: August 9, 1906 Sheboygan, Wisconsin, U.S.
- Died: April 11, 1994 (aged 87) Sheboygan, Wisconsin, U.S.
- Listed height: 6 ft 0 in (1.83 m)
- Listed weight: 185 lb (84 kg)

Career information
- Playing career: 1925–1945
- Position: Guard

Career history
- 1925–1928: Sheboygan
- 1928–1929: Sheboygan Merchants
- 1929: Sheboygan Chair
- 1929–1930: Beloit Fairies
- 1930–1933: Kohler Recreations
- 1933–1935: Sheboygan Ballhorns
- 1935–1937: Sheboygan Art Imigs
- 1937–1938: Sheboygan Enzo Jels
- 1938–1940, 1945: Sheboygan Red Skins

John Anton Posewitz (August 9, 1906 – April 11, 1994) was an American professional basketball player. He played for the Sheboygan Red Skins in the National Basketball League and averaged 2.4 points per game. He was the brother of professional basketball player Scoop Posewitz.

He also played minor league baseball. Teams included the Waynesboro Red Birds (1930), Springfield Red Wings (1931), Elmira Red Wings (1932), and the Mobile Red Warriors (1932).
