= Dave Quabius =

American basketball player

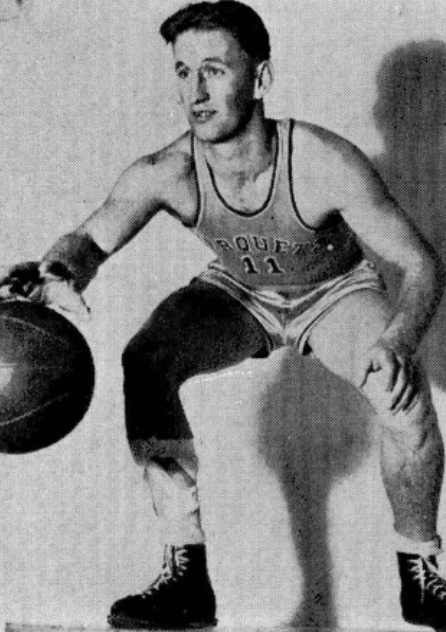
- Quabius from the 1939 Hilltop

Personal information
- Born: March 16, 1916
- Died: June 19, 1983 (aged 67) Milwaukee, Wisconsin, U.S.
- Listed height: 5 ft 11 in (1.80 m)
- Listed weight: 185 lb (84 kg)

Career information
- High school: North Division (Milwaukee, Wisconsin)
- College: Marquette (1936–1939)
- Position: Guard

Career history
- 1938–1941: Sheboygan Red Skins
- 1942–1943: Oshkosh All-Stars

Career highlights
- Third-team All-American – Converse (1939)

David Quabius (March 16, 1916 – June 19, 1983) was an American basketball player who played in the National Basketball League (NBL). From Milwaukee, Wisconsin, Quabius played for North Division High School and Marquette University. Following his college career, Quabius played in the NBL for the Sheboygan Red Skins and Oshkosh All-Stars, averaging 4.7 ponts per game in four seasons.

Quabius died on June 19, 1983, of a heart attack.
