= Whiting High School =

Location
- 1751 Oliver Street; Whiting, Lake County, Indiana 46394; United States; 41.681024°N 87.493818°W

Information
- Type: Public high school
- School district: School City of Whiting
- Principal: Julie Fregien
- Teaching staff: 23.83 (FTE)
- Grades: 9-12
- Enrollment: 422 (2023-2024)
- Student to teacher ratio: 17.71
- Color
- Athletics conference: Greater South Shore
- Team name: Oilers
- Website: Official Website

Whiting High School is a public high school located in Whiting, Indiana. It was founded in 1898.

All of Whiting is in the School City of Whiting, and this is the sole comprehensive high school of that school district.

== Sports ==
1954 State Football Champions | See Indiana big school football champions

== See also ==
- List of high schools in Indiana
