= Ed Dancker =

American basketball player

Personal information
- Born: March 14, 1914 Milwaukee, Wisconsin, U.S.
- Died: October 3, 1991 (aged 77) Milwaukee, Wisconsin, U.S.
- Listed height: 6 ft 7 in (2.01 m)
- Listed weight: 200 lb (91 kg)

Career information
- High school: South Division (Milwaukee, Wisconsin)
- Position: Center

Career history
- 1934–1935: Milwaukee Pure Oils
- 1935–1936: Milwaukee Harvesters
- 1935–1936: Sheboygan Enzo Jels
- 1936–1937: Sheboygan Art Imigs
- 1937–1948: Sheboygan Red Skins
- 1948–1949: Oshkosh All-Stars
- 1948–1950: Milwaukee Shooting Stars
- 1950–1951: New Holstein

Career highlights
- NBL All-Time Team; NBL champion (1943); 3× All-NBL First Team (1943, 1944, 1946); 2× All-NBL Second Team (1942, 1945)

Edward Charles Dancker (March 14, 1914 – October 3, 1991) was an American professional basketball player.

A 6'7" center who grew up in Milwaukee, Wisconsin, Dancker began his professional career in 1938 with the Sheboygan Red Skins of the National Basketball League (NBL). He averaged 7.8 points per game and served as the team captain. He also was the longest-tenured player in the Sheboygan franchise, with him playing for Sheboygan until 1948 following the end of the NBL's penultimate season of existence. For the 1948–49 season, Dancker played for the nearby Oshkosh All-Stars instead, though he wouldn't play for the majority of Oshkosh's final season of existence as a professional franchise. Dancker was a five-time NBL All-Star and ranked fourth among all-time NBL scoring leaders.
