= Sheboygan Red Skins =

Former NBA basketball team in Sheboygan, Wisconsin

- Division: Western (1949–1950)
- Founded: 1933
- Folded: 1952
- History: The Ballhorns; 1933–1935 (Independent); Art Imigs; 1935–1937 (Independent); Enzo Jels; 1937–1938 (Independent); Sheboygan Red Skins; 1938–1949 (NBL); 1949–1950 (NBA); 1950–1951 (NPBL); 1951–1952 (Independent)
- Arena: Eagles Auditorium (1938–1942); Sheboygan Municipal Auditorium and Armory (1942–1952)
- Location: Sheboygan, Wisconsin
- Team colors: Red and white
- Championships: NBL: 1943

The Sheboygan Red Skins (or Redskins) were a professional basketball team based in Sheboygan, Wisconsin, which was an original National Basketball Association franchise during the 1949–50 season.

== History ==
=== Overview ===
The Red Skins played in three professional leagues and as an independent team. The leagues were, in order, the National Basketball League (NBL member from 1938–1949); the National Basketball Association (charter member of the NBA during its 1949–1950 season), and the National Professional Basketball League (founding NPBL member for the short-lived 1950–1951 season).

The team first originated in 1933 from informal clubs that were sponsored by local businesses. During their first two years of existence, they originally played as "The Ballhorns" (or rather, just Ballhorns) due to them being sponsored by a local florist and funeral parlor during that time, before their sponsorship changed hands to having them be named the "Art Imigs" (with their jerseys being spelled out as "Art Imig's") due to them being sponsored by a local dry cleaning shop owned by a man named Art Imig for two more seasons before having the more well-known precursor name of the "Enzo Jels" (sometime misspelled as the "Enzo Gels") due to them being sponsored by a local gelatin manufacturer called Enzo-Pac. Due to being one of the best competing teams in the nation after the NBL's debut season under that name (they originally started out as the Midwest Basketball Conference in 1935 before becoming the National Basketball League two years later), they would join the NBL by New Year's Eve of 1938 as the "Sheboygan Red Skins", which were owned by a syndicate within the city of Sheboygan instead of a sponsor. The Red Skins continued playing in the NBL from 1938 to 1949, with them leading the league in defense five times, appearing in five NBL championship matches there, and winning that league's 1942–43 title, defeating the league-leading Fort Wayne Zollner Pistons (today's Detroit Pistons) in the 1943 NBL Finals despite finishing that season with a 12–11 record.

They were undone by the merger of the NBL and the BAA. The other league which merged to form the NBA (the Basketball Association of America) had more money, played in larger cities, and generally fielded better teams.

The Red Skins were one of seven franchises which quickly left the NBA. The league contracted after the 1949–1950 season, losing six teams; the Anderson Packers, Denver Nuggets, Sheboygan Red Skins, and Waterloo Hawks jumped ship out of the NBA to create the NPBL (with the original Nuggets franchise rebranding themselves to be the Denver Frontier Refiners in the process), while the St. Louis Bombers and Chicago Stags folded. The NBA shrank from 17 teams to 11 before the 1950–1951 season began. The Washington Capitols folded midway through the season, reducing the number of teams in the league to ten.

The Red Skins did not fit well, left the league, and joined the short-lived NPBL. When that league folded, the team returned to its independent roots for one more year of play before it also disappeared.

=== Early years ===
The team formed in Sheboygan as the Ballhorns in 1933. Sponsors changed every couple of years, and the team changed its name to match its current sponsor. Successful playing regional rivals and distant touring teams, they were invited to join the fledgling NBL in 1938. Now a full-time professional organization with an extensive traveling schedule, it took more than one local business to support the team. A syndicate of Sheboygan community members incorporated the team as the Red Skins, and they gradually became successful.

==== Barnstorming roots ====
Before joining the NBL, Sheboygan had developed a reputation in the Midwest during the early 1930s for successful industrial-league and barnstorming teams. The Ballhorns, sponsored by a local furniture store and funeral parlor, began in 1933; local tailor and dry cleaner Art Imig took over in 1935, and gelatin producer Enzo-Pac sponsored the team two years later.

Brothers Johnny and Joe "Scoop" Posewitz, Les Kuplic, Slim Lonsdorf, Carl Roth, Pete and Dugan Norris, and John Cinealis were among the better Sheboygan players during the decade. The 6-foot-6-inch (198 cm) Jack Mann, one of the first outstanding Black players in the game, starred at center during the 1936–37 season. In 1937–38, they had a 17–3 record against teams such as the New York Renaissance, Harlem Globetrotters, New York Celtics and Chicago Duffy Florals.

The team had a friendly rivalry with the Oshkosh All-Stars. The All-Stars' founder and president was Lon Darling, who helped found the NBL in 1937 and became league president the following year.

==== Transition to professional team ====
After the successful 1937–38 season, the Enzo Jels were admitted to the NBL on June 11, 1938, at the league meeting in Oshkosh, Wisconsin with help from Darling. They were soon taken over by a group of local business leaders and renamed the Red Skins. Their first coach was Edwin "Doc" Schutte, a local dentist.

After compiling an 11–17 record in his only season, Schutte stepped down to devote more time to his practice. The Red Skins were consistent winners under attorney and coach Frank Zummach from 1939 to 1942, including a spot opposite the Oshkosh All-Stars in the 1941 NBL finals. Zummach (an assistant coach at Marquette University for six seasons) formed his team around Marquette alumni, including All-American Dave Quabius, Glenn R. "Sparky" Adams, George Hesik, Bill McDonald and Paul Sokody. Sandlotter Otto Kolar, from Cicero, Illinois, was rated one of the Midwest's best guards and ran the Red Skins offense.

==== Arenas ====
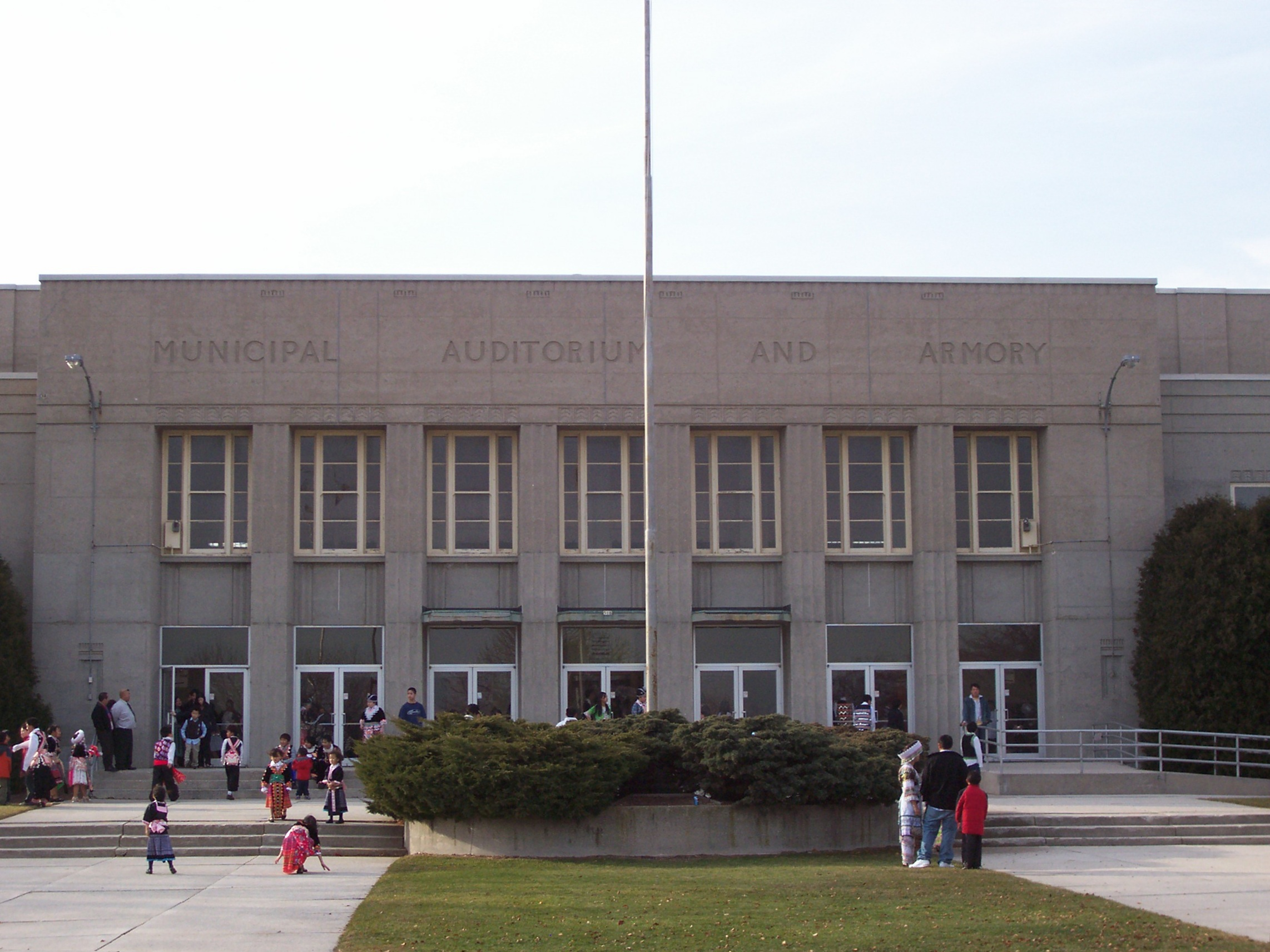
Sheboygan Municipal Auditorium and Armory, the Red Skins' arena

The Red Skins left the 1,500-seat Eagles Auditorium in downtown Sheboygan in late 1942 and moved into the 3,500-seat Sheboygan Municipal Auditorium and Armory, five blocks away near Lake Michigan. The Eagles Auditorium, part of the Playdium building, was destroyed by fire in 1977.

Known as "the Armory," the armory was a WPA project and contained the NBL's largest floor at the time: 90 by 50 feet (27 by 15 m). It was added to Wisconsin's register of historic places in 2019.

=== Middle years ===
==== NBL title ====
The Red Skins reached their zenith in 1942–43 under coach Carl Roth, who had played for Sheboygan's industrial-league powerhouses during the 1930s and on the first Red Skins team in 1938–39. The late-season acquisition of Hall of Fame guard Buddy Jeannette, who joined Sheboygan for their last four regular-season games and the playoffs and commuted from his home in Rochester, New York, was a significant factor in the team's 1943 NBL title. Jeannette, who worked at a Rochester defense plant and traveled to Sheboygan games primarily on weekends, averaged 15.5 points per game when final scores hovered in the 30s and 40s. Other major contributors to Sheboygan's championship team were NBL rookie of the year Ken Buehler, all-league players Ed Dancker and Ken Suesens, and shooter Rube Lautenschlager. The team received the inaugural Naismith Memorial Trophy.

==== Continued success ====
After winning their only NBL title, the Red Skins continued to be one of the strongest teams in professional basketball and appeared in the next three championship series (1944, 1945 and 1946) behind Mike Novak – a 6-foot-9-inch (206 cm) former All-American from Loyola – and Dancker: a 6-foot-7-inch (201 cm) player who honed his skills in the Milwaukee recreational leagues. Suesens, Lautenschlager, Dick Schulz, Tony Kelly, Al Lucas, Al Moschetti and Bobby Holm were other key Red Skins during this period. The signing of Lucas, Moschetti and Holm by Basketball Hall of Famer Dutch Dehnert in 1944 was the team's first acquisition of a group of name players from the East Coast.

Sheboygan lost in the finals to Fort Wayne in 1944 and 1945, the latter after a 2–0 lead in the best-of-five series. They lost in 1946 to the powerhouse Rochester Royals, who had Hall of Famers Al Cervi, Bob Davies and Red Holzman. Dehnert coached the Red Skins to consecutive divisional titles, leaving after the 1945–46 season to coach the Cleveland Rebels of the Basketball Association of America.

Sheboygan remained among the NBL's elite teams, securing playoff berths in 1947 and 1949. Before the 1946–47 season, the Red Skins were the first NBL team to fly to the West Coast. They played at Los Angeles' Grand Olympic Auditorium and lost two close games to the Los Angeles Red Devils, whose best player was UCLA alumnus Jackie Robinson; the following spring, Robinson broke baseball's color barrier. Sheboygan finished the season with a 26–18 record (two games behind first-place Oshkosh in the Western Division), but the Red Skins lost to the All-Stars 49–47 in the fifth – and deciding – game of their first-round playoff.

==== Rebuilding ====
For about a month in December 1947, Hall of Fame player Bobby McDermott was a player-coach for the Red Skins. He was obtained from the Chicago American Gears after the Professional Basketball League of America folded the previous month. McDermott played in 16 games for Sheboygan, scoring 138 points. As coach, he took the reins from Doxie Moore and had a 4–5 record. Moore resumed coaching Sheboygan after McDermott left to join the Tri-Cities Blackhawks in January 1948. The season was one of the Red Skins' most disappointing; the team was aging and in disarray, with a 23–37 record.

In 1948–49 (the NBL's last season) the Red Skins unveiled a fresh group of stars, including Kentucky All-American Bob Brannum, Valparaiso star Milt Schoon, Texas guard Danny Wagner, Washington guard Merlin "Boody" Gilbertson, Iowa center Noble Jorgensen and Wisconsin guard Bobby Cook. With holdovers Mike Todorovich (a first-team NBL pick in 1947–48), Wisconsin forward Paul Cloyd, University of Toledo guard Bob Bolyard, Northwestern football and basketball All-American Max Morris and player-coach Suesens (who had starred at Iowa, where he roomed with Heisman Trophy winner Nile Kinnick), the Red Skins finished their 11th season in the NBL with a 35–29 record.

Only the Oshkosh All-Stars appeared in more NBL championship series (six) than Sheboygan, or played more seasons in the league (12). The Red Skins made the NBL playoffs eight times and were invited to appear in nearly every prestigious World Pro Tournament held in Chicago. Their best finish in Chicago was in 1939, when they lost the consolation championship to the Harlem Globetrotters.

=== Final years ===
After the 1948–1949 season, the team went into decline due to changes in professional basketball. Although the rival BAA had formed a few years earlier and the leagues saw an opportunity to expand the game's appeal through a merger, many NBL teams could not compete at the BAA level; they did not have corporate money or a big-city fan base. The mismatch drove many former NBL teams to leave after one season, including the Red Skins.

Those teams attempted to recover by forming a new league, but it also only lasted one season. The Red Skins tried to continue, but failed to form another new league and closed after an independent run during the 1951–1952 season.

==== NBA charter member ====
On August 3, 1949, Sheboygan and six other NBL teams merged with the 10-team BAA to become the National Basketball Association. The Red Skins, who played in the NBA's smallest arena (and market), competed in the 1949–50 season with Suesens as coach and finished with a 22–40 record: fourth place in the six-team Western Division. When Oshkosh folded soon after the merger, Sheboygan became the country's oldest professional basketball franchise. The Red Skins had a 7–2 start with home victories against the Boston Celtics, New York Knicks, Rochester Royals, and Indianapolis Olympians.

The most spectacular win of the 1949–50 season was on January 5, 1950, when they defeated George Mikan and the Minneapolis Lakers 85–82 in front of a standing-room-only crowd of 3,800 fans at the Armory. Four future Hall of Famers were on the floor for Minneapolis that Thursday night: Mikan (who scored 42 points), Jim Pollard, Vern Mikkelsen and Slater Martin. The Lakers' coach was Hall of Famer John Kundla. The victory against that season's eventual NBA champion gave the Red Skins a 13–13 record, after which injuries took their toll and the team faded. They qualified for the playoffs, however, where they nearly upset the Western Division champion Indianapolis Olympians in a best-of-three series.

==== National Professional Basketball League ====
The team was unwelcome in the NBA during their first season. Ned Irish, president of the New York Knicks, refused to participate in the same league as the "bush leagues": small-city charter NBA teams from the NBL, such as the Red Skins, Waterloo Hawks and Anderson Packers. Sheboygan withdrew from the NBA on April 24, 1950, and joined the new National Professional Basketball League with several other NBA teams.

The NPBL formed around the former NBL/NBA teams, with larger-market teams added. The charter teams were the East Division Red Skins, Anderson Packers, Louisville Alumnites and Grand Rapids Hornets, and the West Division Denver Refiners/Evansville Agogans, Saint Paul Lights, Kansas City Hi-Spots and Waterloo Hawks. Sheboygan posted the NPBL's best record (29–16) in 1950–51. Sheboygan and Waterloo finished first in their respective divisions, but the league did not conduct a playoff and dissolved at the end of the regular season. Both teams claimed the championship, based on division play.

==== Attempt to survive ====
In mid-1951, longtime Red Skins president Magnus Brinkman led a drive to form a league which would have been called the Western Basketball Association, consisting of eight to 10 teams and seeking two other NBA castoffs: the Waterloo Hawks and the Anderson Packers. Competition from the NBA became too great, however, and the effort failed.

The Red Skins played one season of independent basketball, in 1951–52, before dissolving. Bobby Cook, who had scored an NBA-record 44 points in a Red Skins home game against the Denver Nuggets in January 1950, coached the team. The final Sheboygan Red Skins team consisted of several former University of Wisconsin players and compiled a winning record, primarily playing other independent Midwest teams. Attendance was low, however, and the team discontinued operations after losing its final game to the College All-Stars at the Armory.

== Notable alumni ==
- Bob Bolyard
- Bob Brannum
- Ken Buehler
- Jack Burmaster
- Paul Cloyd
- Bobby Cook
- Ed Dancker
- Merlin "Boody" Gilbertson
- John Givens
- Luther Harris
- George Hesik
- Bobby Holm
- Noble Jorgensen
- Tony Kelly
- Otto Kolar
- John Kotz
- Les Kuplic
- Walt Lautenbach
- Rube Lautenschlager
- Fred B. Lewis
- Slim Lonsdorf
- Al Lucas
- Bill McDonald
- Max Morris
- Al Moschetti
- Mike Novak
- Wally Osterkorn
- Jack Phelan
- Joe "Scoop" Posewitz
- Johnny Posewitz
- Dave Quabius
- Carl Roth
- Milt Schoon
- Paul Sokody
- Kenny Suesens
- Mike Todorovich
- Danny Wagner

=== Naismith Basketball Hall of Fame ===
Sheboygan Red Skins Hall of Famers
Players
No.	Name	Position	Tenure	Inducted
—	Buddy Jeannette	G	1943	1994
—	Bobby McDermott	G	1947	1988
Coaches
Name		Position	Tenure	Inducted
Dutch Dehnert		Head coach	1944–1946	1969

== Head coaches ==
- Edwin "Doc" Schutte, 1938–39
- Frank Zummach, 1939–1942
- Carl Roth, 1942–1944
- Henry "Dutch" Dehnert, 1944–1946
- Doxie Moore, 1946–1948
- Bobby McDermott, 1947–48 (player-coach)
- Ken Suesens, 1948–1951 (player-coach in 1948–49)
- Bobby Cook, 1951–52 (player-coach)

== Season-by-season records ==
Note: W = wins, L = losses, % = win–loss %

Season	W	L	%	Playoffs	Results
Sheboygan Red Skins (NBL)
1938–39	11	17	0.393		
1939–40	15	13	0.536	1–2	Lost Western Division Playoff (Finals) to Oshkosh All-Stars
1940–41	13	11	0.542	2–4	Lost NBL Finals to Oshkosh All-Stars
1941–42	10	14	0.417		
1942–43	12	11	0.522	4–1	NBL Champions (Defeated Fort Wayne Zollner Pistons)
1943–44	14	8	0.636	2–4	Lost NBL Finals to Fort Wayne Zollner Pistons
1944–45	19	11	0.633	4–4	Lost NBL Finals to Fort Wayne Zollner Pistons
1945–46	21	13	0.618	3–5	Lost NBL Finals to Rochester Royals
1946–47	26	18	0.591	2–3	Lost Western Division Semifinals to Oshkosh All-Stars
1947–48	23	37	0.383		
1948–49	35	29	0.547	0–2	Lost Western Division Semifinals to Tri-Cities Blackhawks
Sheboygan Red Skins (NBA)
1949–50	22	40	0.355	1–2	Lost Western Division Semifinals to Indianapolis Olympians
Sheboygan Red Skins (NPBL)
1950–51	29	16	0.644		Top mark for the season when league dissolved. (Unofficial co-champions with Waterloo Hawks; can be considered the only champions.)
