= Pittsburgh Raiders =

NBL professional basketball team

- Division: Eastern Division
- Leagues: National Basketball League
- Founded: 1931; 1944
- Folded: 1939; 1950
- History: Pittsburgh Y.M.H.A. 1931–1935; 1935–1937 (MBC); Pittsburgh Pirates; 1937–1939 (NBL); 1947 (WPBT); Team operations suspended 1939–1944; Pittsburgh Corbetts; 1944 (WPBT); Pittsburgh Raiders; 1944–1945 (NBL); 1945–1950
- Arena: Duquesne Gardens
- Location: Pittsburgh, Pennsylvania
- Team colors: Black, yellow, white
- Ownership: Meyer "Buck" Gefsky

The Pittsburgh Raiders were an American professional basketball team based in Pittsburgh, Pennsylvania. They had originally been known as the Pittsburgh Y.M.H.A. in their earliest existence back in 1931, to the point of even playing in the Midwest Basketball Conference's first two seasons under that same team name (even becoming a playoff team in their first season there) before becoming the Pittsburgh Pirates, in homage to the Major League Baseball team of the same name in 1937 once the MBC decided to rebrand itself into the National Basketball League. From there, the rebranded Pittsburgh Pirates franchise would play in the newly-rebranded NBL for two seasons (having a winning season in their first NBL season) before essentially folding operations and leaving the NBL in 1939, with them later coming back into the NBL in 1944 as the Pittsburgh Raiders. With their inclusion alongside that of the Chicago American Gears for the 1944–45 NBL season, the NBL (which was operating at a historically low four teams in its previous season) would decide that they'd be comfortable to return to utilizing divisional play for their seasons once again after previously not using divisions since the 1940–41 NBL season. Unfortunately for the Raiders, their season would see them be the weakest team competing in the entire league, as they finished their only season under that name with a 7–23 record before leaving the NBL altogether. While the NBL would later try to entice the Raiders to come back to the NBL a season later in 1946, their position in the NBL would ultimately be bought out by the team that later became the Toledo Jeeps instead. Interestingly, some early history involving them had misconstrued the franchise as continuing on as the Youngstown Bears in Youngstown, Ohio when they had actually only bought the players off of the Raiders franchise onto the Bears franchise that the city of Youngstown had created for the NBL.

== History ==
1944–45 Pittsburgh Raiders season
- Head coach: Joe Urso (player-coach)
- General manager: Joe Urso
- Owner: Meyer "Buck" Gefsky
- Arena: Duquesne Gardens

Results
- Record: 7–23 (.233)
- Place: Division: 3rd (Eastern)
- Playoff finish: Did not qualify

After previously having the Pittsburgh Pirates basketball franchise become inactive as a team for multiple seasons, Meyer "Buck" Gefsky would have enough money on his end to decide to revive his old basketball team in 1944, albeit under a completely different name from what they had previously been playing under. This move would come from seeing the 1944 World Professional Basketball Tournament where the Pittsburgh Corbetts (who had been the local Pittsburgh winners to represent their city for the 1944 event) had participated in the WPBT that year. Once the tournament had been completed, Gefsky would buy out most of the players on that roster and rebrand that roster from the Pittsburgh Corbetts to the Pittsburgh Raiders, though he would inform the local league officials in the NBL that the Pittsburgh Raiders were actually a continuation of the original Pittsburgh Pirates NBL team that had played in their league for its first two seasons of existence. As such, the 1944–45 Pittsburgh Raiders season was technically the first and only professional basketball season of play for the Pittsburgh Raiders in the city of Pittsburgh, Pennsylvania under the National Basketball League, which officially was the eighth season that it existed as a professional basketball league after previously existing as a semi-pro or amateur basketball league called the Midwest Basketball Conference in its first two seasons back in 1935. However, if one were to include their start as the Pittsburgh Y.M.H.A. team back in 1931 back when they were an amateur team from the Pittsburgh Young Men's Hebrew Association before they joined the Midwest Basketball Conference for the two seasons they played in that league before the MBC got rebranded into the NBL and the Pittsburgh Y.M.H.A. basketball team got rebranded into the Pittsburgh Pirates NBL team for a couple of years before folding for a few years before briefly returning as the Raiders independent team for one season before technically returning to the NBL, this would officially be (at least) their ninth season of play as a franchise. Due to them being joined alongside the Chicago American Gears, the NBL would return to their two division formatting they had for the first time since the 1939–40 NBL season (despite this season having one less team on board than even the 1940–41 and 1941–42 NBL seasons), the Raiders would be one of six teams competing in the NBL for the 1944–45 NBL season, with three teams (including the Raiders) being in the Eastern Division and three teams in the Western Division this time around.

During this season, the Pittsburgh Raiders would face significant struggles as a team this season, which weren't helped by them playing the defending NBL and WPBT champions in the Fort Wayne Zollner Pistons (now known as the Detroit Pistons of the NBA) as one of two division rivaling teams for the season alongside the recently rebranded Cleveland Allmen Transfers, who had become stronger as a team following their first (and only season) of play as the Cleveland Chase Brassmen due to their new head coach, Joseph J. Carlin, informing star player Mel Riebe to do more things for his team than just shoot the ball as the leading scorer for them. Because of their unfortunate placement in the NBL for this season (which wouldn't have helped matters had they been placed in the Western Division instead), the Raiders would see themselves winning five home games and two road games to end their only NBL season with a 7–23 record, being behind the Cleveland Allmen Transfers by six games to miss out on the second (and final) playoff spot of the Eastern Division. (Pittsburgh would win both of their road games against the Oshkosh All-Stars with a close 43–41 season opening victory on November 29, 1944 and their final victory of the season occurring on February 3, 1945 through a 55–48 win, while their home victories took place on December 6, 1944 with a close 55–53 victory over the Cleveland Allmen Transfers (which had the Raiders getting a 2–2 record at the time); December 20 with a close 49–47 victory over the Sheboygan Red Skins; and a three-game winning streak (all at home) that began on January 8, 1945 with a 49–42 victory over Oshkosh, continued on January 13 with a 48–42 win against Cleveland, and ended on January 15 with a 64–49 beatdown win against the Chicago American Gears.) After competing in the 1945 World Professional Basketball Tournament, the Raiders would end up leaving the NBL to become an independent team again for the rest of their existence going forward. However, fans of the Raiders franchise in Youngstown, Ohio would purchase the players from the Pittsburgh Raiders franchise and have the players there operate under a new moniker in their area in the NBL as the Youngstown Bears for the next two seasons instead since fans of the team in Youngstown wanted to outright purchase the Raiders and have them move to Youngstown. Not only that, but the NBL had been interested in bringing back the Pittsburgh Raiders for the 1946–47 NBL season before their spot was bought up and occupied by the new Toledo Jeeps franchise (who may or may not also be derived from another NBL team themselves in the Toledo Jim White Chevrolets) held in nearby Toledo, Ohio. Pittsburgh would later have a new professional team take over with the Pittsburgh Ironmen in the newer, more recently created Basketball Association of America (which lasted for only one season for that team), while the Raiders franchise continued to exist until 1950 first as an independent franchise (as noted by their appearance in the 1946 World Professional Basketball Tournament and a surprise cameo return of the Pittsburgh Pirates team name for the 1947 World Professional Basketball Tournament) and then as an Amateur Athletic Union franchise.

Despite the Raiders finishing their only NBL season with the worst record in the league (being five games behind the Western Division's third place team, the Oshkosh All-Stars, for the worst record in the league this season), Pittsburgh would still see center Huck Hartman make it to the All-NBL Second Team for his performances throughout the 1944–45 NBL season. Sadly, Hartman would end up passing away a year after earning his honor within the NBL (following the end of the Youngtown Bears' first NBL season) due to pneumonia.

== NBL Roster ==
Please note that due to the way records for professional basketball leagues like the NBL and the ABL were recorded at the time, some information on both teams and players may be harder to list out than usual here.

1944–45 Pittsburgh Raiders roster
Players

Pos.	No.	Player	Height	Weight	DOB	From
F/C	14	Irv Brenner	6 ft 4 in (1.93 m)	200 lb (91 kg)	1913–05–31	Duquesne
F/C	5	Ralph Churchfield	6 ft 5 in (1.96 m)	220 lb (100 kg)	1918–01–01	Washington & Jefferson
G/F	10	Freddie Crum	6 ft 0 in (1.83 m)	170 lb (77 kg)	1912–12–03	Schleny HS (PA)
F/C		Hank Evans	6 ft 3 in (1.91 m)	195 lb (88 kg)	1914–12–06	Sharon HS (PA)
G/F		George Haines	5 ft 10 in (1.78 m)	160 lb (73 kg)	1921–08–02	Bucknell
C		Huck Hartman	6 ft 7 in (2.01 m)	205 lb (93 kg)	1920–10–23	Washington & Jefferson
G/F	12	Nat Hickey	5 ft 11 in (1.80 m)	180 lb (82 kg)	1902–01–30	Hoboken HS (NJ)
F/C		Paul Kessy	6 ft 3 in (1.91 m)	170 lb (77 kg)	1915–05–17	Milwaukee
F/C		Pete Lalich	6 ft 2 in (1.88 m)	180 lb (82 kg)	1920–06–23	Ohio
G		Sid Levine	5 ft 7 in (1.70 m)	185 lb (84 kg)	1918–07–09	Fifth Avenue HS (PA)
G/F		Bobby Neu	6 ft 1 in (1.85 m)	170 lb (77 kg)	1917–06–28	DePaul
G		John Novotny	5 ft 10 in (1.78 m)	165 lb (75 kg)	1918–01–29	Appalachian State
G		Joe Proksa	6 ft 1 in (1.85 m)	185 lb (84 kg)	1914–06–30	Penn State
F/C		Jack Scarry	6 ft 3 in (1.91 m)	195 lb (88 kg)	1917–05–29	Duquesne
G/F		Al Schrecker	6 ft 1 in (1.85 m)	160 lb (73 kg)	1917–07–23	Schleny HS (PA)
G		Johnny Stevenson	5 ft 6 in (1.68 m)	155 lb (70 kg)	1913–05–25	Monessen HS (PA)
G	6	Joe Urso	5 ft 10 in (1.78 m)	170 lb (77 kg)	1916–09–17	Duquesne
F	4	Matt Vaniel	6 ft 3 in (1.91 m)	170 lb (77 kg)	1919–11–14	Scott HS (PA)
G/F		Frank Vukosic	6 ft 0 in (1.83 m)	170 lb (77 kg)	1915–04–08	Unknown

Coaches
Head coach
- Joe Urso

Legend
- (DP) Unsigned draft pick
- (FA) Free agent
- (S) Suspended
- Injured

Roster

In addition to them, two other players in Ray Radakovich from Pittsburgh and Ralph Taggart from Geneva would end up playing for them during the 1945 World Professional Basketball Tournament.

== National Basketball League ==
=== 1944–45 regular season ===
==== NBL schedule ====
Not to be confused with exhibition or other non-NBL scheduled games that did not count towards Pittsburgh's official NBL record for this season. An official database created by John Grasso detailing every NBL match possible (outside of two matches that the Kankakee Gallagher Trojans won over the Dayton Metropolitans in 1938) would be released in 2026 showcasing every team's official schedules throughout their time spent in the NBL. As such, these are the official results recorded for the Pittsburgh Raiders during their only season in the NBL (at least if we consider them their own franchise as opposed to a continuation of sorts from the original Pittsburgh Pirates NBL franchise).

#	Date	Opponent	Score	Record
1	November 29	@ Oshkosh	43–41	1–0
2	November 30	@ Sheboygan	41–44	1–1
3	December 3	@ Cleveland	53–54	1–2
4	December 6	Cleveland	55–53	2–2
5	December 9	Chicago	54–64	2–3
6	December 15	Fort Wayne	42–53	2–4
7	December 17	@ Fort Wayne	33–65	2–5
8	December 20	Sheboygan	49–47	3–5
9	December 27	Chicago	38–50	3–6
10	December 30	@ Oshkosh	50–55	3–7
11	December 31	@ Sheboygan	36–62	3–8
12	January 4	Sheboygan	37–48	3–9
13	January 8	Oshkosh	49–42	4–9
14	January 13	Cleveland	48–42	5–9
15	January 15	Chicago	64–49	6–9
16	January 18	@ Cleveland	43–57	6–10
17	January 24	Fort Wayne	41–55	6–11
18	January 30	@ Fort Wayne	53–63	6–12
19	January 31	@ Chicago	60–62	6–13
20	February 1	@ Sheboygan	46–49	6–14
21	February 2	N Oshkosh	47–51	6–15
22	February 3	@ Oshkosh	55–48	7–15
23	February 11	@ Cleveland	48–50	7–16
24	February 13	Oshkosh	44–55	7–17
25	February 17	@ Chicago	54–61	7–18
26	February 21	Sheboygan	47–62	7–19
27	February 24	Fort Wayne	53–55	7–20
28	February 25	@ Fort Wayne	62–63	7–21
29	February 28	Cleveland	49–73	7–22
30	March 3	@ Chicago	66–93	7–23

At the time the 1944–45 NBL regular season concluded for both the Pittsburgh Raiders and the Chicago American Gears (with the NBL concluding the following day afterward on March 4 between the Cleveland Allmen Transfers and the defending NBL champion Fort Wayne Zollner Pistons), the Raiders and American Gears set a league record for the most points scored in one NBL game with 159 total points scored and the most field goals scored with 61 field goals made by both teams on March 3 (though it would be the Chicago American Gears that would have the record for the most points scored in league history at the time with 93 points scored in Pittsburgh's final match in the NBL).

==== Season standings ====
Pos.	Eastern Division	Wins	Losses	Win %
1	Fort Wayne Zollner Pistons	25	5	.833
2	Cleveland Allmen Transfers	13	17	.433
3	Pittsburgh Raiders	7	23	.233

=== Season statistics ===
Rk	Player	Pos	G	FG	FT	PTS	FGA	FTA	PPG
1	Huck Hartman	C	30	127	73	327	4.2	2.4	10.9
2	Hank Evans	F-C	28	97	44	238	3.5	1.6	8.5
3	Joe Urso	G	29	81	40	202	2.8	1.4	7.0
4	Matt Vaniel	F	24	78	23	179	3.3	1.0	7.5
5	Freddie Crum	G-F	29	69	30	168	2.4	1.0	5.8
6	George Haines	G-F	26	56	33	14	1.3	1.0	3.5
7	Ralph Churchfield	F-C	20	26	15	67	1.3	0.8	3.4
8	Irv Brenner	F-C	14	28	8	64	2.0	0.6	4.6
9	Pete Lalich	F-C	9	8	4	20	0.9	0.4	2.2
10	Sid Levine	G	18	4	1	9	0.2	0.1	0.5
11	Nat Hickey	G-F	2	3	2	8	1.5	1.0	4.0
12	Joe Proksa	G	1	2	3	7	2.0	3.0	7.0
13	Al Schrecker	G-F	1	3	1	7	3.0	1.0	7.0
14	Jack Scarry	F-C	6	3	1	7	0.5	0.2	1.2
15	John Novotny	G	1	2	0	4	2.0	0.0	4.0
16	Johnny Stevenson	G	1	2	0	4	2.0	0.0	4.0
17	Paul Kessy	F-C	2	1	1	3	0.5	0.5	1.5
18	Bobby Neu	G-F	3	0	1	1	0.0	0.3	0.3
19	Frank Vukosic	G-F	4	0	0	0	0.0	0.0	0.0

=== Awards and honors ===
- All-NBL Second Team – Huck Hartman
- All-Time Stars of Professional Basketball Second Team – Nat Hickey

== 1945 World Professional Basketball Tournament ==
After the Pittsburgh Corbetts (who had most of the same players that would later play for the Pittsburgh Raiders in the 1944–45 NBL season) previously participated in the 1944 World Professional Basketball Tournament as the representatives for Pittsburgh that year (and lost a close first round match to the world-famous (all-black) Harlem Globetrotters through a 41–40 final score), the Pittsburgh Raiders would become one of five NBL teams (with the only NBL team not entering the 1945 event being the Sheboygan Red Skins, who had previously entered every World Professional Basketball Tournament up until this point in time) to participate in the 1945 World Professional Basketball Tournament that was held in Chicago from March 19–24, 1945. In addition to the other NBL teams that were in this tournament, the Raiders would also go up against nine other independently ran teams that would compete in this event. For the Raiders, their first round opponent would be the independently ran Newark C-O Twos team in Newark, New Jersey. While the Newark squad would keep things pretty close with Pittsburgh for the first round match held on March 20, the Raiders would ultimately beat the C-O Twos with a 53–50 final score to have them advance into the quarterfinal round.

In the quarterfinal round, Pittsburgh would go up against the all-black New York Renaissance, a team that sought to gain their second ever WPBT championship after winning the inaugural tournament held in 1939 (though it's believed that the players there might have already done so while playing under the Washington Bears name for the 1943 version of the event). After the Renaissance beat the Indianapolis Oilers (who are considered to be the former NBL Indianapolis Kautskys team playing under a different name while waiting for World War II to end) 67–59 in the first round, New York would go and defeat the Raiders 61–52 to end their only season (or third and final season if you count the two seasons of the Pittsburgh Pirates NBL team) in NBL history for the Raiders franchise. The Renaissance would later not only lose in their semifinal rematch to the Fort Wayne Zollner Pistons (who would end their season as the only repeat champions for both the NBL and the WPBT at the same time) with a blowout 68–45 loss, but also lose their third place consolation prize game to the Chicago American Gears with a 64–55 defeat as well.

=== Scores ===
- Won the first round (53–50) over the Newark C-O Twos.
- Lost quarterfinal round (52–61) to the New York Renaissance.

== 1946 World Professional Basketball Tournament ==
Despite leaving the NBL following their only complete season under the Pittsburgh Raiders name, the Raiders would decide to participate in the 1946 World Professional Basketball Tournament (which was held in Chicago from March 25–April 8, 1946 as the longest WPBT event ever held) as one of the independently ran teams competing in the competition this time around. Out of 39 potential candidates for the tournament's list of invites, the Raiders would be one of the lucky 14 teams to make it to the tournament, which was mostly between other independently run teams (such as the all-black New York Renaissance and the military-ran Dayton Mickeys alongside a few other teams that would later become NBL franchises themselves (albeit under different names) such as the Anderson Chiefs (or the Chief Anderson Meat Packers), the Toledo White Huts (or Toledo Whites), and the Midland Dow Chemicals, and current (at the time) NBL franchises alongside the ABL's own champion franchise in the Baltimore Bullets. Unfortunately for the Raiders, their first round opponent in the 1946 WPBT would be the local hometown Chicago American Gears NBL team, who not only had the first invitation for the WPBT this time around, but would also get themselves a newly-recruited George Mikan from DePaul University (who had played only two exhibition games with them before they had entered this WPBT) alongside Price Brookfield to join their roster for this event. With the additions of Brookfield and especially Mikan (with the local newspapers covering George Mikan and his performance for that match in particular), the Raiders would not stand much of a chance at succeeding at all, as the local Chicago American Gears would defeat the Raiders 69–58 in their only match for the 1946 event. Meanwhile, the Chicago American Gears would go as far as the semifinal round before losing to the Oshkosh All-Stars (who ended up losing the championship round series to the Fort Wayne Zollner Pistons 2–1) in what would be considered an upset performance due to them fouling out key players like George Mikan (who was later named the WPBT MVP that year despite not competing in the championship match), with them later acquiring a third place finish by sweeping the ABL's Baltimore Bullets 2–0.

=== Game played ===
- Lost first round (58–69) to Chicago American Gears

== 1947 World Professional Basketball Tournament ==
Despite the crushing blow they had in the 1946 World Professional Basketball Tournament, the absence of the Chicago American Gears due to the 1947 NBL Playoffs (specifically their championship series match-up against the defending NBL champion Rochester Royals) led to the Raiders trying to compete in the World Professional Basketball Tournament one last time. However, instead of competing under the usual Pittsburgh Raiders name that they've used for most of their existence in the 1940s, they are considered to have opted to instead compete under their original professional team name of the Pittsburgh Pirates for the 1947 World Professional Basketball Tournament, which was held in Chicago from April 7–11, 1947. Once again, Pittsburgh would be one of 14 teams competing in a single-elimination, winner-takes-all format, though the 1947 event would mostly feature teams from the National Basketball League and other independently-ran teams like this Pittsburgh squad (which included the all-black New York Renaissance and the Midland Dow Chemicals works team that later joined the NBL themselves under a new team name), as well as the American Basketball League's defending champion Baltimore Bullets and the ultimately short-lived Pacific Coast Professional Basketball League's Portland Indians. However, by this point in time, the NBL's franchises would turn out to be leagues above the competition when compared to most other independent teams, as demonstrated by Pittsburgh's first round opponent in the 1947 WPBT, the Anderson Duffey Packers. With the size, strength, and experience that Anderson had over the Pittsburgh squad by this time, the Duffey Packers would end up easily crushing the Pirates in a 59–38 blowout defeat. Following this season's defeat, the Pirates would go back to the Pittsburgh Raiders name and downgrade their experience as a team from a proper independent franchise competing against other teams that were sometimes professionally ran to operating as an Amateur Athletic Union franchise in their final three seasons of existence before folding operations for good by 1950.

=== Game played ===
- Lost first round (38–59) to Anderson Duffey Packers
