= 1944–45 Chicago American Gears season =

NBL professional basketball team season

- Head coach: Jack Tierney (6–10); Swede Roos (player-coach; 8–6)
- General manager: Jack Tierney
- Owner(s): Maurice White; American Gear & Manufacturing Company
- Arena: Chicago Stadium

Results
- Record: 14–16 (.467)
- Place: Division: 2nd (Western)
- Playoff finish: Lost Western Division Playoff to Sheboygan Red Skins, 2–1; Won third place at 1945 WPBT 64–55 over New York Renaissance

The 1944–45 Chicago American Gears season was the American Gears' first year in the United States' National Basketball League (NBL), which was also the eighth year the league existed. However, if you include the (at least) one previous season where they competed in the Amateur Athletic Union before making the jump into the NBL, this would actually be their second season of play instead. With that being said, with the inclusion of the Chicago American Gears franchise (being owned by the American Gear Company's Maurice White) and the Pittsburgh Raiders (who were suggested to be the return of the original Pittsburgh Pirates NBL team that got rebranded in the process), this season marked the end of the division-less era of the NBL (despite it ending at a time where they had less teams competing than when it first began before World War II first began for the U.S.A.), with the 1944–45 season consisting of six total teams, with three teams involved in each of the Eastern and Western Divisions.

Chicago played their home games at the Chicago Stadium for this season, with every home game in the NBL guaranteeing payment of $400 to the visitors for at least this season. Also, for at least this season, if not multiple seasons after this one, the team would have a dog mascot named Jigs be around with the team. Following a long stretch of games with no real break in mind (playing seven games in eight days), Jack Tierney would resign from his head coach position due to health concerns (though he'd still remain as the general manager for the season) and be replaced by Swede Roos as a player-coach for the rest of the season. Despite barely finishing this season with a losing record (scraping by for a 14–16 finish), they would still end up with a second-place finish in the Western Division, which would earn them their first ever qualification in the NBL Playoffs over the longstanding Oshkosh All-Stars (a team who had not only seen the NBL Playoffs up until this point in time, but also would ultimately only miss the NBL Playoffs during this specific season of play). Unfortunately for the American Gears, the only opponent they would see in the Western Division Playoff match-up they got was the Sheboygan Red Skins, which was a team that Chicago had beaten only one time in the regular season. While they would upset Sheboygan once again during the playoffs, the American Gears would be too weak to counter Sheboygan's strengths as a team, as the Red Skins would take the series 2–1 and move on to the NBL Championship match with ease, where they ended up seeing the Fort Wayne Zollner Pistons and got affected by a 3–2 reverse sweep there.

In addition to the NBL Playoffs, the Chicago American Gears also participated in the World Professional Basketball Tournament as the local home team throughout the event as well. The American Gears would only compete against some independently ran teams in the Hartford Nutmegs, Harlem Globetrotters, Dayton Acmes, and New York Renaissance during this event, with them upsetting the world-famous (all-black) Harlem Globetrotters in the quarterfinal round, but being blown out in the semifinal round by the military-based Dayton Acmes (who were composed of players from the rivaling American Basketball League and the all-black New York Renaissance) and being prevented from facing off against the NBL's Fort Wayne Zollner Pistons in the championship round (and by extension, potentially upsetting the Zollner Pistons in the WPBT's championship round by comparison). However, the American Gears would see themselves get a consolation third place prize match-up against the all-black New York Renaissance, which they would also upset in that match-up as well due to the leadership of Dick Triptow.

Stan Patrick would be named a member of the All-NBL First Team, while Dick Triptow was named a member of the All-NBL Second Team. Not only that, but Stan Patrick would also be named the NBL's Rookie of the Year as well. Interestingly, for at least this offseason period, the Chicago American Gears would also play under the White-Liners name (which was named after the "White-Liner" trademark that Maurice White had at the time) as a local 16" softball team (similar to what the Fort Wayne Zollner Pistons had done in their early history as a franchise when playing both basketball and baseball/softball (in their case, a local, championship-winning 12" softball team) before ultimately deciding to stick with basketball for good once they entered the NBL) that also featured Elmer Gainer, Swede Roos, and Dick Triptow all competing as players on that team as well, with the American Gears/White-Liners winning the championship for that specific sporting event.

== Roster ==
1944–45 Chicago American Gears roster
Players

Pos.	No.	Player	Height	Weight	DOB	From
F/C		Jim Ashe	6 ft 3 in (1.91 m)	200 lb (91 kg)	1919–02–22	Unknown
F/C		Connie Mack Berry	6 ft 3 in (1.91 m)	200 lb (91 kg)	1915–04–19	NC State
F/C		Elmer Gainer	6 ft 6 in (1.98 m)	205 lb (93 kg)	1918–11–22	DePaul
F/C		Nick Hashu	6 ft 1 in (1.85 m)	195 lb (88 kg)	1917–02–01	Michigan State
G		Ray Krzoska	6 ft 2 in (1.88 m)	190 lb (86 kg)	1918–10–28	Milwaukee
G/F		Bill McDonald	6 ft 3 in (1.91 m)	190 lb (86 kg)	1916–11–05	Marquette
F/C		Vince McGowan	6 ft 6 in (1.98 m)	210 lb (95 kg)	1913–08–12	DePaul
G		Johnny Orr	5 ft 11 in (1.80 m)	180 lb (82 kg)	1918–06–04	St. Benedict's
F		Frank Otway	6 ft 4 in (1.93 m)	205 lb (93 kg)	1923–03–01	Chicago
G/F		Stan Patrick	6 ft 2 in (1.88 m)	185 lb (84 kg)	1922–05–05	Illinois
G/F		Swede Roos	6 ft 1 in (1.85 m)	180 lb (82 kg)	1913–08–08	Illinois State
G/F		Ed Scheiwe	5 ft 11 in (1.80 m)	175 lb (79 kg)	1918–02–25	Wisconsin
F/C		Joseph Stampf	6 ft 4 in (1.93 m)	210 lb (95 kg)	1919–12–16	Chicago
G/F		Chet Strumillo	5 ft 11 in (1.80 m)	175 lb (79 kg)	1924–05–28	Illinois
F/C		John Styler	6 ft 6 in (1.98 m)	225 lb (102 kg)	1923–10–19	Unknown
G/F		Dick Triptow	6 ft 0 in (1.83 m)	170 lb (77 kg)	1922–11–03	DePaul

Coaches
Head coach
- Jack Tierney
- Swede Roos

Legend
- (DP) Unsigned draft pick
- (FA) Free agent
- (S) Suspended
- Injured

Roster

Note: Nick Hashu might have only been on the playoff roster, while Frank Otway, Swede Roos, Joe Stampf, and Chet Strumillo were not on the playoffs roster (with Swede Roos being a full-time head coach by this point in time). In fact, the Chicago American Gears would also add Price Brookfield, Kleggie Hermsen, and George Ratkovicz onto their roster for the 1945 World Professional Basketball Tournament.

== Regular season ==
=== Season standings ===
Pos.	Western Division	Wins	Losses	Win %
1	Sheboygan Red Skins	19	11	.633
2	Chicago American Gears	14	16	.467
3	Oshkosh All-Stars	12	18	.400

=== NBL Schedule ===
Reference: Dick Triptow's The Dynasty That Never Was

#	Date	Opponent	Score	Record
1	December 2	@ Oshkosh	29–47	0–1
2	December 3	@ Sheboygan	28–50	0–2
3	December 13	@ Pittsburgh	64–54	1–2
4	December 20	Oshkosh	52–46	2–2
5	December 23	Cleveland	51–42	3–2
6	December 25	@ Cleveland	47–64	3–3
7	December 26	@ Fort Wayne	50–59	3–4
8	December 27	@ Pittsburgh	50–38	4–4
9	January 3	Fort Wayne	64–73	4–5
10	January 10	Sheboygan	45–46	4–6
11	January 11	@ Sheboygan	48–52	4–7
12	January 13	@ Oshkosh	52–50	5–7
13	January 14	@ Cleveland	49–62	5–8
14	January 15	@ Pittsburgh	49–64	5–9
15	January 16	@ Fort Wayne	49–59	5–10
16	January 17	Oshkosh	43–36	6–10
17	January 24	Cleveland	59–50	7–10
18	January 27	Fort Wayne	52–50	8–10
19	January 31	Pittsburgh	62–60	9–10
20	February 3	Cleveland	40–66	9–11
21	February 4	@ Fort Wayne	59–60	9–12
22	February 7	Sheboygan	53–38	10–12
23	February 8	@ Sheboygan	43–53	10–13
24	February 10	@ Oshkosh	47–51	10–14
25	February 14	Fort Wayne	57–55	11–14
26	February 17	Pittsburgh	61–54	12–14
27	February 21	Oshkosh	66–58	13–14
28	February 25	@ Cleveland	46–57	13–15
29	February 28	Oshkosh	45–46	13–16
30	March 3	Pittsburgh	93–66	14–16

Each team would play each other a total of six times for 3 home and road games each for 30 total NBL season matches for this particular season of play.

== NBL Playoffs ==
=== NBL Western Division Playoff ===
(2W) Chicago American Gears vs. (1W) Sheboygan Red Skins: Sheboygan wins series 2–1

- Game 1: March 5, 1945 @ Sheboygan: Chicago 50, Sheboygan 49
- Game 2: March 7, 1945 @ Chicago: Sheboygan 49, Chicago 36
- Game 3: March 9, 1945 @ Sheboygan: Sheboygan 57, Chicago 47

== Awards and honors ==
The Chicago American Gears would be the only NBL team without a current or former player of theirs to be nominated for a spot on one of the All-Time Stars of Professional Basketball Teams during this season.

- NBL Rookie of the Year – Stan Patrick
- First Team All-NBL – Stan Patrick
- Second Team All-NBL – Dick Triptow

== World Professional Basketball Tournament ==
For the first time ever in the franchise's history, the Chicago American Gears would enter the annual World Professional Basketball Tournament in Chicago, which the 1945 event was held on March 19–24, 1945 and was mostly held by independently ran teams alongside every NBL team from this season outside of the Sheboygan Red Skins due in part to World War II. However, unlike every other team competing in this year's WPBT, the American Gears would have a home crowd advantage of sorts due to them representing the city of Chicago this year. As the opening game of the WPBT in the first round, the American Gears would go up against the independently ran Hartford Nutmegs out in Hartford, Connecticut, who are suggested to be the future Hartford Hurricanes of the rivaling American Basketball League. Despite the American Gears ending their NBL season with a losing record (albeit by only one game to the point of still being considered a playoff team in the NBL), they would still end up proving to be a better overall team than the Hartford roster they went up against (thanks primarily to the combined scoring efforts of Stan Patrick, Dick Triptow, and Price Brookfield with 15, 10, and 7 points respectively), with Chicago winning 58–47 over the Nutmegs as the local fans looked to see what team their home town squad would go up against next in this tournament.

In the quarterfinal round, after a day of rest, the American Gears went up against one of the two teams that had been given a bye in the WPBT this year, the world famous Harlem Globetrotters. As per usual from the Harlem Globetrotters, they would compete in this match (much like in other years they had participated in the WPBT, including the 1940 event where they actually won the championship there) by utilizing their typical mixture of comedic chicannery with the intent to win the game as best as they possibly could do so. However, the local Chicago fans in this event were cheering more for the American Gears than they were for the Globetrotters' antics this time around, which would prove to help the team enough of a team effort at hand necessary to upset the world famous Harlem Globetrotters with a 53–49 final score to knock out one of the two teams to get a first round bye in this year's WPBT. While Chicago didn't have Stan Patrick playing in this particular game, their teamwork would come through once again with a combination of Dick Triptow, Price Brookfield, and Kleggie Hermsen this time around scoring 13, 12, and 11 points respectively in their bid to upset the Globetrotters in the quarterfinal round, leaving their local fans excited to see who their local team would go up against next to potentially beat down and upset for a spot at the championship matchup.

After another day of rest, the semifinal round saw the American Gears go up against yet another independently ran team in the Dayton Acmes, who were a team locally sponsored by the Acme United Corporation that was composed of servicemen players that were primarily from the American Basketball League and the New York Renaissance that were stationed at the Wright Field in Riverside, Ohio, including future NBL/BAA/NBA players Bruce Hale (who would later play for the Chicago American Gears himself) and John Mahnken, who were both named All-Tournament First Team members. While the local fans expected the American Gears to have a competitive match against the Acmes and potentially win against them, it instead turned out to be a brutal beatdown where the Dayton squad (led through the high-scoring efforts of Hale and Mahnken with 23 and 22 points respectively) upset the local Chicago squad in a horrific beatdown with an 80–51 upset that saw the unknown military-based Dayton squad (who previously beat the similarly unknown independently ran squads in the military-based Long Island Grumman Hellcats and the Midland Dow Chemicals works team) go to the championship round to compete against the two-time defending NBL champions and most recent WPBT champions Fort Wayne Zollner Pistons instead of the American Gears. As such, the local fans had to settle for cheering for a potential third place prize for their local team instead.

Finally, on March 24, the American Gears would end their first ever WPBT experience with a third place consolation prize match against a pre-tournament favorite, the all-black New York Renaissance, leaving them with an experience where they competed against only independently ran franchises for this specific event. Unlike the similarly all-black rostered Harlem Globetrotters of this era, who combined chicannery with seriousness when playing basketball during this period of time, the Renaissance made sure to play the game of basketball with 100% seriousness in mind, as noted with the first three minutes of play when they got off to an 11–4 start to lead the third place game. While Chicago would try to come back from their poor start by first being down 21–14 by the end of the first quarter and then being down 33–30 at halftime (though tying the game twice in the second quarter with a 25–25 and 26–26 score), it wouldn't be until the midway point of the third quarter where they caught up with the New York squad, with the end of the third quarter being where the American Gears would end up leading the game properly with a 46–44 lead over the Renaissance. While the Rens tried to tie the game twice in the fourth quarter themselves, Chicago would utilize stalling tactics when they had a five-point lead with five or so minutes left to go, which made the Renaissance nervous and subsequently gave the American Gears some extra openings to extend their lead to win the third place game with a 64–55 final score, with Price Brookfield being the team's leading scorer with 15 points scored that night. Despite that note in mind, only Dick Triptow would be the sole Chicago American Gears member to be named a member of the All-Tournament Team this year, with him being named a member of their first team.

=== Scores ===
- Won first round (58–47) over the Hartford Nutmegs
- Won quarterfinal round (53–49) over the Harlem Globetrotters
- Lost semifinal round (80–51) to the Dayton Acmes
- Won third place consolation prize match (64–55) over the New York Renaissance

=== Awards and honors ===
- Dick Triptow, All-Tournament First Team
