= List of NBA players (H) =

This is a list of National Basketball Association players whose last names begin with H.

The list also includes players from the American National Basketball League (NBL), the Basketball Association of America (BAA), and the original American Basketball Association (ABA). All of these leagues contributed to the formation of the present-day NBA.

Individuals who played in the NBL prior to its 1949 merger with the BAA are listed in italics, as they are not traditionally listed in the NBA's official player registers.

== H ==
- Ha Seung-Jin
- Bill Haarlow
- Rui Hachimura
- Rudy Hackett
- Hamed Haddadi
- Jim Hadnot
- Scott Haffner
- Cliff Hagan
- Glenn Hagan
- Tom Hagan
- Ashton Hagans
- Bob Hahn
- George Haines
- Warren Hair
- Al Hairston
- Happy Hairston
- Lindsay Hairston
- Malik Hairston
- P. J. Hairston
- Marcus Haislip
- Chick Halbert
- Swede Halbrook
- Bruce Hale
- Hal Hale
- Jack Haley
- Tyrese Haliburton
- Shaler Halimon
- Devon Hall
- Donta Hall
- Jordan Hall
- Josh Hall
- Mike Hall
- PJ Hall
- Tyler Hall
- Jeff Halliburton
- Darvin Ham
- Ray Hamann
- Steve Hamer
- Dale Hamilton
- Daniel Hamilton
- Dennis Hamilton
- Joe Hamilton
- Jordan Hamilton
- Justin Hamilton
- Ralph Hamilton
- Richard Hamilton
- Roy Hamilton
- Steve Hamilton
- Tang Hamilton
- Thomas Hamilton
- Zendon Hamilton
- Geert Hammink
- Julian Hammond
- Tom Hammonds
- A. J. Hammons
- Joe Hamood
- R. J. Hampton
- Darrin Hancock
- Ben Handlogten
- Cecil Hankins
- Phil Hankinson
- Dusty Hannahs
- Alex Hannum
- Don Hanrahan
- Rollen Hans
- Ben Hansbrough
- Tyler Hansbrough
- Bob Hansen
- Glenn Hansen
- Lars Hansen
- Travis Hansen
- Reggie Hanson
- Bill Hanzlik
- Bill Hapac
- Luke Harangody
- Penny Hardaway
- Tim Hardaway
- Tim Hardaway Jr.
- James Harden
- Reggie Harding
- Charles Hardnett
- Alan Hardy
- Darrell Hardy
- Jaden Hardy
- James Hardy
- Ira Harge
- John Hargis
- Elijah Harkless
- Maurice Harkless
- Jerry Harkness
- Skip Harlicka
- Jerome Harmon
- Derek Harper
- Dylan Harper
- Jared Harper
- Justin Harper
- Mike Harper
- Ron Harper
- Ron Harper Jr.
- Matt Harpring
- Montrezl Harrell
- Josh Harrellson
- Adam Harrington
- Al Harrington
- Lorinza Harrington
- Othella Harrington
- Art Harris
- Bernie Harris
- Billy Harris
- Bob Harris
- Chris Harris
- Devin Harris
- Elias Harris
- Gary Harris
- Jalen Harris
- Joe Harris
- Kevon Harris
- Lucious Harris
- Luther Harris
- Manny Harris
- Mike Harris
- Steve Harris
- Terrel Harris
- Tobias Harris
- Tony Harris
- Aaron Harrison
- Andrew Harrison
- Bob Harrison
- David Harrison
- Shaquille Harrison
- Jason Hart
- Josh Hart
- Isaiah Hartenstein
- Huck Hartman
- Antonio Harvey
- Don Harvey
- Donnell Harvey
- Nick Hashu
- Scott Haskin
- Clem Haskins
- Udonis Haslem
- Trenton Hassell
- Billy Hassett
- Joe Hassett
- Bob Hassmiller
- Scott Hastings
- Kirk Haston
- Vernon Hatton
- Sam Hauser
- John Havlicek
- Spencer Hawes
- Steve Hawes
- Connie Hawkins
- Earl Hawkins
- Hersey Hawkins
- Juaquin Hawkins
- Marshall Hawkins
- Michael Hawkins
- Robert Hawkins
- Tom Hawkins
- Chuck Hawley
- Nate Hawthorne
- Chuck Hayes
- Elvin Hayes
- Jarvis Hayes
- Jaxson Hayes
- Jim Hayes
- Killian Hayes
- Nigel Hayes
- Ray Hayes
- Steve Hayes
- Gordon Hayward
- Lazar Hayward
- Brendan Haywood
- Spencer Haywood
- John Hazen
- Walt Hazzard
- Luther Head
- Shane Heal
- Brian Heaney
- Gar Heard
- Reggie Hearn
- Pete Hecomovich
- Herm Hedderick
- Alvin Heggs
- Tom Heinsohn
- Dickie Hemric
- Alan Henderson
- Cedric Henderson (b. 1965)
- Cedric Henderson (b. 1975)
- Curt Henderson
- David Henderson
- Gerald Henderson
- Gerald Henderson Jr.
- J. R. Henderson
- Jerome Henderson
- Kevin Henderson
- Scoot Henderson
- Tom Henderson
- Taylor Hendricks
- Mark Hendrickson
- Larry Hennessy
- Don Henriksen
- Aaron Henry
- Al Henry
- Bill Henry
- Carl Henry
- Conner Henry
- Myke Henry
- Skeeter Henry
- Xavier Henry
- Bob Henshaw
- John Henson
- Steve Henson
- Charlie Hentz
- Chucky Hepburn
- Paul Herman
- Bill Herman
- Kleggie Hermsen
- Dewan Hernandez
- Juan Hernangómez
- Willy Hernangómez
- Chris Herren
- Carl Herrera
- Walter Herrmann
- Tyler Herro
- Keith Herron
- Sidney Hertzberg
- Kevin Hervey
- George Hesik
- Dan Hester
- Fred Hetzel
- Bill Hewitt
- Jack Hewson
- Art Heyman
- Mario Hezonja
- Roy Hibbert
- Nat Hickey
- Isaiah Hicks
- Phil Hicks
- JJ Hickson
- Buddy Hield
- Bill Higgins
- Cory Higgins
- Earle Higgins
- Jim Higgins
- Mike Higgins
- Rod Higgins
- Sean Higgins
- Kenny Higgs
- Johnny High
- Haywood Highsmith
- Wayne Hightower
- Jim Hilgemann
- Armond Hill
- Cleo Hill
- Gary Hill
- George Hill
- Grant Hill
- Jordan Hill
- Malcolm Hill
- Mort Hill
- Simmie Hill
- Solomon Hill
- Steven Hill
- Tyrone Hill
- Darrun Hilliard
- Art Hillhouse
- Darnell Hillman
- Fred Hilton
- Kirk Hinrich
- Blake Hinson
- Roy Hinson
- Nate Hinton
- Pat Hintz
- Mel Hirsch
- Lew Hitch
- Robert Hite
- Joel Hitt
- Jaylen Hoard
- Darington Hobson
- D'Moi Hodge
- Donald Hodge
- Julius Hodge
- Craig Hodges
- Charlie Hoefer
- Johnny Hoekstra
- Howie Hoffman
- Paul Hoffman
- George Hogan
- Bob Hogsett
- Paul Hogue
- Fred Hoiberg
- Doug Holcomb
- Randy Holcomb
- Aaron Holiday
- Jrue Holiday
- Justin Holiday
- Bill Holland
- Brad Holland
- Joe Holland
- John Holland
- Ron Holland
- Wilbur Holland
- Lionel Hollins
- Ryan Hollins
- Essie Hollis
- Rondae Hollis-Jefferson
- Bobby Holm
- Denny Holman
- DaRon Holmes II
- Ife Holmes
- Richaun Holmes
- Chet Holmgren
- Jim Holstein
- A. W. Holt
- Michael Holton
- Dick Holub
- Joe Holup
- Red Holzman
- Jim Homer
- Jerald Honeycutt
- Tyler Honeycutt
- Derek Hood
- Rodney Hood
- Jalen Hood-Schifino
- Bobby Hooper
- Carroll Hooser
- Tom Hoover
- Bob Hopkins
- Bryce Hopkins
- Dave Hoppen
- Dennis Hopson
- Scotty Hopson
- Johnny Horan
- Cedrick Hordges
- Al Horford
- Tito Horford
- Ron Horn
- Jeff Hornacek
- Dennis Horner
- Robert Horry
- Ed Horton
- Talen Horton-Tucker
- Bill Hosket Jr.
- Bill Hosket Sr.
- Bob Houbregs
- Danuel House Jr.
- Eddie House
- Caleb Houstan
- Allan Houston
- Byron Houston
- Tom Hovasse
- Brian Howard
- Dwight Howard
- Greg Howard
- Jett Howard
- Josh Howard
- Juwan Howard
- Markus Howard
- Mo Howard
- Otis Howard
- Stephen Howard
- William Howard
- Bailey Howell
- Bob Hubbard
- Phil Hubbard
- Lee Huber
- Trevor Hudgins
- Lester Hudson
- Lou Hudson
- Roosie Hudson
- Troy Hudson
- Marcelo Huertas
- Kevin Huerter
- Josh Huestis
- Jay Huff
- Marv Huffman
- Nate Huffman
- Vern Huffman
- Alfredrick Hughes
- Eddie Hughes
- Elijah Hughes
- Kim Hughes
- Larry Hughes
- Rick Hughes
- Ariel Hukporti
- Harold Hull
- Robbie Hummel
- John Hummer
- Ryan Humphrey
- Isaac Humphries
- Jay Humphries
- Kris Humphries
- Hot Rod Hundley
- Feron Hunt
- Brandon Hunter
- Cedric Hunter
- Chris Hunter
- De'Andre Hunter
- Les Hunter
- Lindsey Hunter
- Othello Hunter
- R. J. Hunter
- Steven Hunter
- Vince Hunter
- C. J. Huntley
- Bobby Hurley
- Roy Hurley
- Matthew Hurt
- Geoff Huston
- Paul Huston
- Hal Hutcheson
- Dar Hutchins
- Mel Hutchins
- Chandler Hutchison
- Herbie Hutchisson
- Joe Hutton
- Art Hyatt
- Greg Hyder
- Bones Hyland
