= 1944–45 National Basketball League (United States) season =

1944–45 NBL season
- League: National Basketball League
- Sport: Basketball
- Duration: November 25, 1944 – March 4, 1945; March 5–9, 1945 (Playoffs); March 11–18, 1945 (Finals)
- Games: 30
- Teams: 6

Regular season
- Season champions: Fort Wayne Zollner Pistons
- Top seed: Fort Wayne Zollner Pistons
- Season MVP: Bobby McDermott (Fort Wayne)
- Top scorer: Mel Riebe (Cleveland)

Playoffs
- Eastern champions: Fort Wayne Zollner Pistons
- Eastern runners-up: Cleveland Allmen Transfers
- Western champions: Sheboygan Red Skins
- Western runners-up: Chicago American Gears

Finals
- Venue: North Side High School Gym, Fort Wayne, Indiana; Sheboygan Armory, Sheboygan, Wisconsin
- Champions: Fort Wayne Zollner Pistons
- Runners-up: Sheboygan Red Skins

NBL seasons
- ← 1943–44 1945–46 →

The 1944–45 NBL season was the tenth National Basketball League (NBL) season. The regular season began on November 25, 1944, and ran until March 4, 1945. The playoffs began on March 5, 1945, and concluded on March 18, 1945, with the Fort Wayne Zollner Pistons winning their second consecutive NBL title over the Sheboygan Red Skins in a rematch of the previous two NBL Championships, with this one ending in a reverse sweep for Fort Wayne after previously being down 0–2 in this series.

For the 1944–45 season, the league returned to an Eastern and Western division format, with three teams in each division. The league was still impacted by World War II, although to a lesser degree than the previous two seasons. The record to adding in divisions would be implemented despite the NBL having less teams in the league this season than their first two seasons they were without divisions at hand by having six teams this season against seven teams in those prior seasons.

== Teams ==
Two teams joined the league prior to the season, bringing the total number of teams back up to six. Similar to the Cleveland franchise that joined the NBL during the previous season, the Chicago American Gears were a new team owned by Maurice White's American Gear & Manufacturing Company that jumped up from the Amateur Athletic Union to the NBL after playing in the AAU for at least one season beforehand. Meanwhile, the Pittsburgh Raiders were a returning franchise that previously played in the NBL as the Pittsburgh Pirates before leaving the NBL in its second season under that name and going under what can be seen as a hiatus of sorts for four seasons before returning to the NBL under their new Raiders team name. Meanwhile, the Cleveland Chase Brassmen renamed themselves into the Cleveland Allmen Transfers.

Eastern Division	Cleveland Allmen Transfers Cleveland, Ohio	Fort Wayne Zollner Pistons Fort Wayne, Indiana	Pittsburgh Raiders Pittsburgh, Pennsylvania
Western Division	Chicago American Gears Chicago, Illinois	Oshkosh All-Stars Oshkosh, Wisconsin	Sheboygan Red Skins Sheboygan, Wisconsin

Coaching changes
Offseason
Team	1943–44 coach	1944–45 coach
Cleveland Allmen Transfers	Bill Brownell (player-coach)	Joseph J. Carlin
Sheboygan Red Skins	Carl Roth	Dutch Dehnert
In-season
Team	Outgoing coach	Incoming coach
Chicago American Gears	Jack Tierney	Swede Roos

== Preseason ==
Prior to the season commencing, the defending champion Fort Wayne Zollner Pistons defeated what were previously considered the undefeated College All-Stars (which was composed of what was considered to be the best, most elite senior college basketball players of the time throughout a yearly basis) by a 44–38 final score in what was dubbed as the "College All-Star Classic" under the handling of the Chicago Herald American, who also set up the World Professional Basketball Tournament setting during the spring. There was also a major rule change implemented prior to the season, with goaltending being abolished due to the rise of larger centers like George Mikan and Bob Kurland being found within college basketball during this period in time. (Before their discovery, it was very rare, if not nearly impossible for players to try and utilize goaltending to their advantage due to the combination of a lack of height and athletic (jumping) prowess being in mind.)

== Regular season ==
The regular season featured a 30-game schedule, where each team would play every other team six times (three at home, three away).

Following the successes of the Allies in Europe, some American soldiers were beginning to return home from the war front by early 1945, which helped lead to a renewed interest in professional basketball across the nation.

=== Final standings ===
Pos.	Eastern Division	Wins	Losses	Win %
1	Fort Wayne Zollner Pistons	25	5	.833
2	Cleveland Allmen Transfers	13	17	.433
3	Pittsburgh Raiders	7	23	.233

Pos.	Western Division	Wins	Losses	Win %
1	Sheboygan Red Skins	19	11	.633
2	Chicago American Gears	14	16	.467
3	Oshkosh All-Stars	12	18	.400

== Postseason ==
=== Playoffs ===
The top two teams from each division qualified for the playoffs. The first round pitted the Fort Wayne Zollner Pistons against the Cleveland Allmen Transfers in the Eastern Division semifinal. The Sheboygan Red Skins and the Chicago American Gears qualified to play in the Western Division semifinal. The semifinals were played in a best-of-three format with the series winners qualifying for the finals.

Fort Wayne and Sheboygan both returned to the finals for the third consecutive season, after the Zollner Pistons swept the Allmen Transfers 2–0 and the Red Skins defeated the American Gears 2–1.

==== Finals ====
The NBL Championship series was played under a best-of-five format, with the low seed hosting the first two games and the high seed hosting the up to three remaining games. The first two games were played at the Sheboygan Armory in Sheboygan and were sellouts. Game 1 resulted in a 65–53 Sheboygan victory, after the Red Skins opened up a lead early on and weathered multiple Pistons comeback attempts. Dick Schulz led the Red Skins with 18 points and Ed Sadowski scored 17 for the Pistons.

WHBL

March 11, 1945
3:00 PM (CWT)

Fort Wayne Zollner Pistons 53, Sheboygan Red Skins 65
Scoring by quarter: 8–16, 22–19, 11–17, 12–13
Pts: Ed Sadowski, 17	Pts: Dick Schulz, 18
Game 1, Sheboygan leads 1–0

Sheboygan Armory
Sheboygan, Wisconsin
Attendance: 3,500
Referees: Messenger, Kriznecky

The second game was another Sheboygan victory, with the Red Skins winning 50–47 in a back-and-forth affair. Ed Dancker scored over half of Sheboygan's points with 29, while Bobby McDermott led a more spread out Pistons offense with 11 points.

WHBL

March 12, 1945
8:30 PM (CWT)

Fort Wayne Zollner Pistons 47, Sheboygan Red Skins 50
Scoring by quarter: 11–13, 7–9, 18–17, 11–11
Pts: Bobby McDermott, 11	Pts: Ed Dancker, 29
Game 2, Sheboygan leads 2–0

Sheboygan Armory
Sheboygan, Wisconsin
Attendance: 3,500
Referees: Messenger, Kriznecky

The series shifted to Fort Wayne for the third game, which saw Fort Wayne defeat Sheboygan 58–47 to narrow Sheboygan's lead in the series to one game. The Pistons opened up a large first-half lead and survived a third-quarter comeback attempt by the Red Skins to secure the victory. Former Red Skin Buddy Jeannette led the Pistons with 13 points, while Rube Lautenschlager paced the Red Skins with 11.

WHBL

March 15, 1945
8:45 PM (CWT)

Sheboygan Red Skins 47, Fort Wayne Zollner Pistons 58
Scoring by quarter: 8–19, 15–20, 17–10, 7–9
Pts: Rube Lautenschlager, 11	Pts: Buddy Jeannette, 13
Game 3, Sheboygan leads 2–1

North Side High School Gym
Fort Wayne, Indiana
Referees: Messenger, Kriznecky

The Pistons tied the series in a noncompetitive fourth game, winning in a 58–41 blowout. McDermott scored 15 points for Fort Wayne, while Schulz and Dancker each scored 11 for Sheboygan.

WHBL

March 16, 1945
8:45 PM (CWT)

Sheboygan Red Skins 41, Fort Wayne Zollner Pistons 58
Scoring by quarter: 12–15, 12–20, 8–10, 9–13
Pts: Dick Schulz, 11; Ed Dancker, 11	Pts: Bobby McDermott, 15
Game 4, series tied 2–2

North Side High School Gym
Fort Wayne, Indiana
Referees: Messenger, Kriznecky

After the fourth game, Sheboygan coach Dutch Dehnert received news that his son was killed in action in Nazi Germany. Dehnert left the team and traveled to New York, with Dancker taking over as Sheboygan's coach for the fifth game. The Pistons completed the "reverse sweep" and sealed their second consecutive NBL title with a 59–49 victory in the fifth and final game. McDermott once again led the Pistons with 19 points, while Schulz and Bobby Holm each had 11 for the Red Skins.

WHBL

March 18, 1945
8:45 PM (CWT)

Sheboygan Red Skins 49, Fort Wayne Zollner Pistons 59
Scoring by quarter: 7–13, 11–19, 14–17, 17–10
Pts: Dick Schulz, 11; Bobby Holm, 11	Pts: Bobby McDermott, 19
Game 5, Fort Wayne wins 3–2

North Side High School Gym
Fort Wayne, Indiana

==== Bracket ====
Division Playoffs
E1	Fort Wayne Zollner Pistons	2
E2	Cleveland Allmen Transfers	0
W1	Sheboygan Red Skins	2
W2	Chicago American Gears	1

NBL Championship
E1	Fort Wayne Zollner Pistons	3
W1	Sheboygan Red Skins	2

- Bold Series winner

=== World Professional Basketball Tournament ===
Following the completion of the NBL season, every NBL team except the Sheboygan Red Skins participated in the 1945 edition of the World Professional Basketball Tournament in Chicago.

The Fort Wayne Zollner Pistons won their second consecutive WPBT title, defeating the Dayton Acmes 78–52. Buddy Jeannette earned his second tournament MVP.

=== NBL All-Star Game ===
Two days after winning their second WPBT championship, the Fort Wayne Zollner Pistons won 59–47 over the NBL's All-Star Team. 3,000 people saw the game at the North Side High School Gym in Fort Wayne, Indiana. Following the game's conclusion, when describing the game in greater detail, The Fort Wayne-Journal Gazette's reporter, Bob Reed, summed up the Fort Wayne Zollner Pistons in what would be described as completing the "Grand Slam of Professional Basketball" by successfully winning the "College All-Star Classic" of 1944, obtaining the best record of the 1944–45 NBL season, winning the 1945 NBL Playoffs' Championship, winning the 1945 World Professional Basketball Tournament, and most recently winning the 1945 NBL All-Star Game for good measure.

== Statistics ==
Category	Player	Team	Stat
Points	Mel Riebe	Cleveland Allmen Transfers	607
Free-Throws	Mel Riebe	Cleveland Allmen Transfers	161
Field goals	Bobby McDermott	Fort Wayne Zollner Pistons	258

Note: Prior to the 1969–70 NBA season, league leaders in points were determined by totals rather than averages. Rebounding and assist numbers were not recorded properly in the NBL like they would be in the BAA/NBA, as would field goal and free-throw shooting percentages.

== Awards ==
- NBL Most Valuable Player: Bobby McDermott, Fort Wayne Zollner Pistons
- NBL Coach of the Year: Bobby McDermott, Fort Wayne Zollner Pistons
- NBL Rookie of the Year: Stan Patrick, Chicago American Gears
- All-NBL First Team:
  - G/F – Mel Riebe, Cleveland Allmen Transfers
  - F/G – Stan Patrick, Chicago American Gears
  - C/F – Leroy Edwards, Oshkosh All-Stars
  - G – Buddy Jeannette, Fort Wayne Zollner Pistons
  - G – **Bobby McDermott**, Fort Wayne Zollner Pistons
- All-NBL Second Team:
  - F/C – Jake Pelkington, Fort Wayne Zollner Pistons
  - C/F – Ed Dancker, Sheboygan Red Skins
  - C – Huck Hartman, Pittsburgh Raiders
  - G/F – Jerry Bush, Fort Wayne Zollner Pistons
  - G – Dick Triptow, Chicago American Gears

=== All-Time Stars of Professional Basketball ===
Near the end of the regular season, the six managers (most of whom were also head coaches) of the NBL's teams for this season (Jack Tierney for Chicago, Jeff Carlin for Cleveland, Carl Bennett for Fort Wayne, Lon Darling for Oshkosh, Joe Urso for Pittsburgh, and Dutch Dehnert for Sheboygan) were polled to vote for what was called the "All-Time Stars of Professional Basketball". The players being voted on included both NBL players and players that were on other professional basketball leagues like the rivaling American Basketball League, with the players being voted on first and second teams for these honors, as well as the honorable mention team. Bolded players showcase those that are currently active NBL players as of this season, while italic players are those who had previously played in the NBL at one point in time. Notably, as of 2026, only Leroy Edwards has yet to enter the Naismith Basketball Hall of Fame in terms of the First Team entries there.

- All-Time Stars of Professional Basketball First Team:
  - G/F – Nat Holman
  - G/F – Dutch Dehnert, Sheboygan Red Skins (current head coach/general manager)
  - F/C – **Leroy Edwards**, Oshkosh All-Stars
  - G – **Bobby McDermott**, Fort Wayne Zollner Pistons
  - G – John Beckman
- All-Time Stars of Professional Basketball Second Team:
  - G/F – **Nat Hickey**, Pittsburgh Raiders
  - C – Wee Willie Smith, New York Renaissance
  - C – Joe Lapchick
  - F – **Jerry Bush**, Fort Wayne Zollner Pistons
  - G – **Buddy Jeannette**, Fort Wayne Zollner Pistons
- All-Time Stars of Professional Basketball Honorable Mention Team:
  - G/F – Curly Armstrong, Fort Wayne Zollner Pistons
  - G/F – **Eddie Riska**, Oshkosh All-Stars
  - C – **Ed Dancker**, Sheboygan Red Skins
  - G – Bennie Borgmann
  - G – Davey Banks

== See also ==
- National Basketball League (United States)
