= 1944–45 Sheboygan Red Skins season =

NBL professional basketball team season

- Division champions
- Head coach: Dutch Dehnert
- Arena: Sheboygan Municipal Auditorium and Armory

Results
- Record: 19–11 (.633)
- Place: Division: 1st (Western)
- Playoff finish: Lost NBL Championship to Fort Wayne Zollner Pistons, 3–2

The 1944–45 Sheboygan Red Skins season was the Red Skins' seventh year in the United States' National Basketball League (NBL), which would also be the eighth year the NBL itself existed. However, if one were to include their few seasons they played as an independent team under a few various team names involving local businesses like the The Ballhorns (being sponsored by a local florist and funeral parlor), the Art Imigs (being sponsored by a local dry cleaning shop owned and operated by a man named Art Imig with team jerseys saying Art Imig's), and the Enzo Jels (being sponsored by a local gelatin manufacturer known as Enzo-Pac) at various points before becoming the Sheboygan Red Skins due to their promotion up into the NBL, this would officially be their twelfth overall season of play as well. Entering this season, the NBL would see themselves increase the number of teams for the first time since the 1941–42 season (before the U.S.A. entered World War II), with the additions of the Chicago American Gears and the Pittsburgh Raiders (who would turn out to be a rebranded return of the original Pittsburgh Pirates NBL team), as well as the rebranding of the Cleveland Chase Brassmen to the Cleveland Allmen Transfers giving the NBL a total of six teams for the 1944–45 season. As a result of this, the NBL decided to bring back divisions for the first time since the 1940–41 season (despite them having a lower number of teams this season when compared to that season and the following season afterward), with the Red Skins returning to the Western Division and the NBL comprising three teams in each of the Eastern Division and the Western Division (Sheboygan's division).

The Red Skins played their home games at the Sheboygan Municipal Auditorium and Armory. Sheboygan would start their season with an up and down November and December to get a 6–4 record to end the 1944 year as the second place team in the revived Western Division. However, by January 1945, Sheboygan would overtake Oshkosh and Chicago to gain first place in their division with a 13–6 record, with the Red Skins later ending the season with a first place Western Division championship by getting a 19–11 record to end the regular season in February. For the fourth time ever in franchise history (1941 & 1943–1944) and the third straight year in a row, the Red Skins advanced to the NBL Championship, with Sheboygan beating the newly created Chicago American Gears 2–1 in what would officially be known as the Western Division Playoff once again as opposed to just the NBL Semifinals. They then went on to the 1945 NBL Championship match-up, which was their second straight rematch against the Fort Wayne Zollner Pistons, with Sheboygan winning their first two matches in that rematch before Fort Wayne completed a reverse sweep (which was the second and final time it happened in the NBL Championship series) on Sheboygan, winning the rematch in a best-of-five series, this time reverse sweeping them 3–2 after Sheboygan first led this championship series 2–0. However, Game 5 of that game would involve some personal tragedy for new head coach Dutch Dehnert, who lost his son, John Dehnert Jr., due to him being killed in action while in Nazi Germany, which led to Dutch being in New York and missing out on the final championship game in the process. Despite their success this season, only Ed Dancker would earn All-NBL honors by the end of this season by being named a member of the All-NBL Second Team.

== Roster ==
1944–45 Sheboygan Red Skins roster
Players

Pos.	No.	Player	Height	Weight	DOB	From
C		Ed Dancker	6 ft 7 in (2.01 m)	200 lb (91 kg)	1914–03–14	South Division HS (WI)
G		Bill Durkin	6 ft 1 in (1.85 m)	160 lb (73 kg)	1922–04–22	Loyola Chicago
G		Bobby Holm	6 ft 0 in (1.83 m)	200 lb (91 kg)	1919–01–22	Seton Hall
G		Tony Kelly	6 ft 1 in (1.85 m)	165 lb (75 kg)	1919–02–18	DePaul
G/F		Rube Lautenschlager	6 ft 2 in (1.88 m)	190 lb (86 kg)	1915–09–07	UW–Oshkosh
G/F		Al Lucas	6 ft 3 in (1.91 m)	195 lb (88 kg)	1922–07–04	Fordham
G/F		Al Moschetti	6 ft 1 in (1.85 m)	180 lb (82 kg)	1920–01–01	St. John's
F/C		Mike Novak	6 ft 9 in (2.06 m)	219 lb (99 kg)	1915–04–23	Loyola Chicago
G		Johnny Posewitz	6 ft 0 in (1.83 m)	185 lb (84 kg)	1906–08–09	Sheboygan HS (WI)?
G/F		Dick Schulz	6 ft 2 in (1.88 m)	192 lb (87 kg)	1917–01–03	Wisconsin
G/F		Hal Tidrick	6 ft 1 in (1.85 m)	190 lb (86 kg)	1915–08–04	Washington & Jefferson

Coaches
Head coach
- Dutch Dehnert

Legend
- (DP) Unsigned draft pick
- (FA) Free agent
- (S) Suspended
- Injured

Roster

Note: Bill Durkin, Johnny Posewitz, and Hal Tidrick were not on this season's playoff roster.

== Regular season ==
=== Season standings ===
Pos.	Western Division	Wins	Losses	Win %
1	Sheboygan Red Skins	19	11	.633
2	Chicago American Gears	14	16	.467
3	Oshkosh All-Stars	12	18	.400

=== NBL Schedule ===
Not to be confused with exhibition or other non-NBL scheduled games that did not count towards Sheboygan's official NBL record for this season. An official database created by John Grasso detailing every NBL match possible (outside of two matches that the Kankakee Gallagher Trojans won over the Dayton Metropolitans in 1938) would be released in 2026 showcasing every team's official schedules throughout their time spent in the NBL. As such, these are the official results recorded for the Sheboygan Red Skins during their seventh season in the NBL.

#	Date	Opponent	Score	Record
1	November 30	Pittsburgh	44–41	1–0
2	December 3	Chicago	50–28	2–0
3	December 7	Fort Wayne	49–55	2–1
4	December 12	@ Fort Wayne	45–47	2–2
5	December 17	Cleveland	47–45 (OT)	3–2
6	December 19	@ Cleveland	55–44	4–2
7	December 20	@ Pittsburgh	47–49	4–3
8	December 23	@ Oshkosh	45–53	4–4
9	December 28	Oshkosh	43–37	5–4
10	December 31	Pittsburgh	62–36	6–4
11	January 2	@ Fort Wayne	39–54	6–5
12	January 3	@ Cleveland	76–57	7–5
13	January 4	@ Pittsburgh	48–37	8–5
14	January 7	Fort Wayne	54–55 (OT)	8–6
15	January 10	@ Chicago	46–45	9–6
16	January 11	Chicago	52–48	10–6
17	January 18	Oshkosh	41–36	11–6
18	January 20	@ Oshkosh	44–41	12–6
19	January 25	Cleveland	50–37	13–6
20	February 1	Pittsburgh	49–46	14–6
21	February 4	Cleveland	42–48	14–7
22	February 7	@ Chicago	38–53	14–8
23	February 8	Chicago	53–43	15–8
24	February 15	Fort Wayne	70–53	16–8
25	February 18	@ Fort Wayne	52–64	16–9
26	February 19	@ Cleveland	41–51	16–10
27	February 21	@ Pittsburgh	62–47	17–10
28	February 24	@ Oshkosh	44–48	17–11
29	February 25	Oshkosh	49–42	18–11
30	February 28	@ Chicago	58–39	19–11

== NBL Playoffs ==
=== NBL Western Division Playoff ===
(1W) Sheboygan Red Skins vs. (2W) Chicago American Gears: Sheboygan wins series 2–1

- Game 1: March 5, 1945 @ Sheboygan: Chicago 50, Sheboygan 49
- Game 2: March 7, 1945 @ Chicago: Sheboygan 49, Chicago 36
- Game 3: March 9, 1945 @ Sheboygan: Sheboygan 57, Chicago 27

=== NBL Championship ===
(1W) Sheboygan Red Skins vs. (1E) Fort Wayne Zollner Pistons: Fort Wayne wins series 3–2

- Game 1: March 11, 1945 @ Fort Wayne: Sheboygan 65, Fort Wayne 53
- Game 2: March 12, 1945 @ Sheboygan: Sheboygan 50, Fort Wayne 47
- Game 3: March 15, 1945 @ Fort Wayne: Fort Wayne 58, Sheboygan 47
- Game 4: March 16, 1945 @ Fort Wayne: Fort Wayne 58, Sheboygan 41
- Game 5: March 18, 1945 @ Fort Wayne: Fort Wayne 59, Sheboygan 49

=== Awards and honors ===
- Second Team All-NBL – Ed Dancker
- All-Time NBL Team – Ed Dancker and Mike Novak
- All-Time Stars of Professional Basketball First Team – Dutch Dehnert (did not play with Sheboygan; is the head coach/general manager of the team)
- All-Time Stars of Professional Basketball Honorable Mention Team – Ed Dancker
