= List of NBA players (T–V) =

This is a list of National Basketball Association players whose last names begin with T, U, or V.

The list also includes players from the American National Basketball League (NBL), the Basketball Association of America (BAA), and the original American Basketball Association (ABA). All of these leagues contributed to the formation of the present-day NBA.

Individuals who played in the NBL prior to its 1949 merger with the BAA are listed in italics, as they are not traditionally listed in the NBA's official player registers.

== T ==
- Žan Tabak
- Yuta Tabuse
- Chris Taft
- Chelso Tamagno
- Sid Tanenbaum
- Dragan Tarlać
- Roy Tarpley
- Levern Tart
- Jae'Sean Tate
- Earl Tatum
- Jayson Tatum
- Edy Tavares
- Anthony Taylor
- Brian Taylor
- Donell Taylor
- Fatty Taylor
- Fred Taylor
- Jay Taylor
- Jeff Taylor
- Jeffery Taylor
- Isaiah Taylor
- Jermaine Taylor
- Johnny Taylor
- Leonard Taylor
- Maurice Taylor
- Mike Taylor
- Ollie Taylor
- Ron Taylor
- Terry Taylor
- Tyshawn Taylor
- Vince Taylor
- Terry Teagle
- Jeff Teague
- Marquis Teague
- Mirza Teletović
- Sebastian Telfair
- Jahmyl Telfort
- Collis Temple
- Garrett Temple
- Miloš Teodosić
- Irving Terjesen
- Ira Terrell
- Jared Terrell
- Carlos Terry
- Chuck Terry
- Claude Terry
- Dalen Terry
- Emanuel Terry
- Jason Terry
- Tyrell Terry
- Ray Terzynski
- Jon Teske
- Hasheem Thabeet
- Tom Thacker
- Floyd Theard
- Daniel Theis
- Reggie Theus
- Peter Thibeaux
- Bill Thieben
- Adou Thiero
- Justus Thigpen
- David Thirdkill
- Adonis Thomas
- Billy Thomas
- Brodric Thomas
- Cameron Thomas
- Carl Thomas
- Charles Thomas
- Earl Thomas
- Etan Thomas
- Irving Thomas
- Isaiah Thomas
- Isiah Thomas
- Jamel Thomas
- James Thomas
- Jim Thomas
- Joe Thomas
- John Thomas
- Kenny Thomas
- Khyri Thomas
- Kurt Thomas
- Lance Thomas
- Malcolm Thomas
- Meleek Thomas
- Matt Thomas
- Ron Thomas
- Terry Thomas
- Tim Thomas
- Tyrus Thomas
- Willis Thomas
- Trey Thompkins
- Amen Thompson
- Ausar Thompson
- Bernard Thompson
- Bill Thompson
- Billy Thompson
- Brooks Thompson
- Bruce Thornton
- Corny Thompson
- David Thompson
- Dijon Thompson
- Ethan Thompson
- George Thompson
- Hollis Thompson
- Homer Thompson
- Jack Thompson
- Jason Thompson
- John Thompson
- Kevin Thompson
- Klay Thompson
- LaSalle Thompson
- Mychal Thompson
- Mychel Thompson
- Paul Thompson
- Stephen Thompson
- Tristan Thompson
- JT Thor
- Skip Thoren
- Rod Thorn
- Al Thornton
- Bob Thornton
- Dallas Thornton
- Jack Thornton
- Marcus Thornton
- Sindarius Thornwell
- Otis Thorpe
- Sedale Threatt
- Nate Thurmond
- Mel Thurston
- Matisse Thybulle
- Milt Ticco
- Hal Tidrick
- Dan Tieman
- Killian Tillie
- Darren Tillis
- Xavier Tillman
- Drew Timme
- Jack Tingle
- George Tinsley
- Jamaal Tinsley
- Wayman Tisdale
- Mike Tobey
- Paul Tobin
- Isaiah Todd
- Mike Todorovich
- Ray Tolbert
- Tom Tolbert
- Anthony Tolliver
- Chet Tollstam
- Dean Tolson
- Rudy Tomjanovich
- Nae'Qwan Tomlin
- Andrew Toney
- Sedric Toney
- John Tonje
- Andy Tonkovich
- Andy Toolson
- Jack Toomay
- Bernard Toone
- Nikola Topić
- Jacob Toppin
- Obi Toppin
- Irv Torgoff
- Bumper Tormohlen
- Óscar Torres
- Juan Toscano-Anderson
- Bill Tosheff
- Bob Tough
- Axel Toupane
- Monte Towe
- Keith Tower
- Carlisle Towery
- Linton Townes
- Karl-Anthony Towns
- Johnny Townsend
- Raymond Townsend
- Armel Traoré
- Nolan Traoré
- George Trapp
- John Q. Trapp
- Luke Travers
- Robert Traylor
- Gary Trent
- Gary Trent Jr.
- Jeff Trepagnier
- John Tresvant
- Allonzo Trier
- Dick Triptow
- Kelly Tripucka
- Ansley Truitt
- Cezary Trybański
- Jake Tsakalidis
- John Tschogl
- Oscar Tshiebwe
- Lou Tsioropoulos
- Nikoloz Tskitishvili
- Al Tucker
- Alando Tucker
- Anthony Tucker
- Jim Tucker
- P. J. Tucker
- Rayjon Tucker
- Trent Tucker
- Ronny Turiaf
- Mirsad Türkcan
- Hedo Türkoğlu
- Andre Turner
- Bill Turner
- Elston Turner
- Evan Turner
- Gary Turner
- Henry Turner
- Herschell Turner
- Jack Turner (b. 1930)
- Jack Turner (b. 1939)
- Jeff Turner
- John Turner
- Myles Turner
- Wayne Turner
- Melvin Turpin
- Dave Twardzik
- Jack Twyman
- B. J. Tyler
- Jeremy Tyler
- Terry Tyler
- Charlie Tyra
- Hunter Tyson
- Jaylon Tyson

== U ==
- Edwin Ubiles
- Mo Udall
- Ekpe Udoh
- Ime Udoka
- Beno Udrih
- Roko Ukić
- Tyler Ulis
- Stanley Umude
- Wes Unseld
- Hal Uplinger
- Kelvin Upshaw
- Joe Urso
- Jim Usry
- Jarrod Uthoff
- Ben Uzoh

== V ==
- Steve Vacendak
- Jonas Valančiūnas
- Darnell Valentine
- Denzel Valentine
- Ronnie Valentine
- John Vallely
- Dick Van Arsdale
- Tom Van Arsdale
- Butch van Breda Kolff
- Jan van Breda Kolff
- Gene Vance
- Jarred Vanderbilt
- Augie Vander Meulen
- Logan Vander Velden
- Ernie Vandeweghe
- Kiki Vandeweghe
- Nick Van Exel
- Keith Van Horn
- Matt Vaniel
- Norm Van Lier
- Nick Vanos
- David Vanterpool
- Fred VanVleet
- Dennis Van Zant
- Ratko Varda
- Anderson Varejão
- Jarvis Varnado
- Greivis Vásquez
- Devin Vassell
- Chico Vaughn
- David Vaughn Jr.
- David Vaughn III
- Jacque Vaughn
- Ralph Vaughn
- Rashad Vaughn
- Virgil Vaughn
- Loy Vaught
- Bob Verga
- Peter Verhoeven
- Jan Veselý
- Gundars Vētra
- Aleksandar Vezenkov
- João Vianna
- Luca Vildoza
- Charlie Villanueva
- Gabe Vincent
- Jay Vincent
- Sam Vincent
- Marcus Vinicius
- Fred Vinson
- Claude Virden
- Gary Voce
- Howard Vocke
- Floyd Volker
- Alexander Volkov
- Noah Vonleh
- Whitey Von Nieda
- Bernie Voorheis
- Jake Voskuhl
- Danny Vranes
- Slavko Vraneš
- Stojko Vranković
- Brett Vroman
- Jackson Vroman
- Nikola Vučević
- Sasha Vujačić
- Tristan Vukčević
- Frank Vukosic
