= 1944–45 Oshkosh All-Stars season =

NBL professional basketball team season

- Head coach: Lon Darling
- General manager: Lon Darling
- Owner: Lon Darling
- Arena: South Park School Gymnasium

Results
- Record: 12–18 (.400)
- Place: Division: 3rd (Western)
- Playoff finish: Did not qualify

The 1944–45 Oshkosh All-Stars season was the All-Stars' eighth year in the United States' National Basketball League (NBL), which was also the eighth year the league existed. However, if one were to include the independent seasons they played starting all the way back in 1929 before beginning their NBL tenure in 1937, this would officially be their fifteenth season of play. Due to the additions of the Chicago American Gears and the Pittsburgh Raiders for this season (the latter of whom were considered to be the return of the original Pittsburgh Pirates NBL team under a new name), this season marked the official return of the NBL utilizing divisional play for their league once again for the first time since the 1939–40 season despite the two seasons before that point having more teams at hand than this season had utilized. Regardless of the motivations or circumstances in mind, Oshkosh would return to play in the Western Division, with three teams representing the Eastern Division and three teams (including Oshkosh) representing the Western Division. The All-Stars played their home games at the South Park School Gymnasium in the South Park Middle School within the Oshkosh Area School District.

At first, Oshkosh looked to have regained the competitive form that they first had when they originally entered the NBL before World War II affected the NBL's landscape by starting out the season with an above-average 4–1 by December 13 and then getting a 6–4 record to end their 1944-year on a more positive note. However, once 1944 turned into 1945 for the All-Stars, that would turn out to be a time where the season would completely fall apart for Oshkosh, as they would enter an eight-game losing streak from January 6–20 to start the new year out on a very poor, which ultimately would be a note that they could not recover from by the end of the season. While Oshkosh would try their best to get back into playoff positioning against the newly created Chicago American Gears, the 6–6 record that they would get for the rest of the season following their eight-game losing streak would not be anywhere near close enough to helping them avoid elimination from qualifying for the NBL Playoffs for the first (and only) time in franchise history. Granted, even if this season had been more like the previous two (or four) seasons where the four best overall teams would qualify for the NBL Playoffs instead of the NBL utilizing the return of divisional formatting like they had done for their early history, Oshkosh still would not have qualified due to their 12–18 record being worse than that of the Cleveland Allmen Transfers (who had a better record than them by one game) for this season as well, with the only team they have had an overall better record against this season being the Pittsburgh Raiders, who ultimately decided to leave the NBL once again following this season's conclusion. While this season would not be their worst season in terms of overall records, it would be their only season in franchise history where they would not reach the NBL Playoffs whatsoever. Despite Oshkosh failing to reach the NBL Playoffs this season, they would still end up seeing Leroy Edwards be named a member of the All-NBL First Team for what would become the final season that he'd be named a member there (with Leroy Edwards being the only key player from this season's team due to Charley Shipp moving on to play for the Fort Wayne Zollner Pistons and some other key players like Gene Englund being a part of the U.S. military this season for World War II purposes).

== Roster ==
1944–45 Oshkosh All-Stars roster
Players

Pos.	No.	Player	Height	Weight	DOB	From
C		Leroy Edwards	6 ft 5 in (1.96 m)	210 lb (95 kg)	1914–04–11	Kentucky
F/C		Ed Erban	6 ft 4 in (1.93 m)	220 lb (100 kg)	1921–07–06	Marquette
G		Ted Fritsch	5 ft 10 in (1.78 m)	210 lb (95 kg)	1920–10–31	UW–Stevens Point
G/F		Homer Fuller	6 ft 3 in (1.91 m)	220 lb (100 kg)	1920–01–09	East Texas State
G/F		Howie Hoffman	6 ft 4 in (1.93 m)	195 lb (88 kg)	1928–12–04	Purdue
G/F		Bill Komenich	6 ft 3 in (1.91 m)	210 lb (95 kg)	1916–07–01	Marquette
G/F		Pete Pasko	6 ft 2 in (1.88 m)	190 lb (86 kg)	1919–09–09	East Stroudsburg State
G		Frank Sachse	6 ft 0 in (1.83 m)	195 lb (88 kg)	1917–07–24	Texas Tech
G		Chuck Shanklin	5 ft 9 in (1.75 m)	160 lb (73 kg)	1921–09–03	Decatur Central HS (IN)
F		Ray Terzynski	6 ft 1 in (1.85 m)	180 lb (82 kg)	1919–11–27	UW–Stevens Point
C		Clint Wager	6 ft 6 in (1.98 m)	210 lb (95 kg)	1920–01–20	Saint Mary's (MN)

Coaches
Head coach
- Lon Darling

Legend
- (DP) Unsigned draft pick
- (FA) Free agent
- (S) Suspended
- Injured

Roster

Note: Bob Carpenter, Des Smith, and Don Smith would replace Ed Erban, Homer Fuller, and Howie Hoffman for the 1945 World Professional Basketball Tournament.

== Regular season ==
=== Season standings ===
Pos.	Western Division	Wins	Losses	Win %
1	Sheboygan Red Skins	19	11	.633
2	Chicago American Gears	14	16	.467
3	Oshkosh All-Stars	12	18	.400

=== NBL Schedule ===
Not to be confused with exhibition or other non-NBL scheduled games that did not count towards Oshkosh's official NBL record for this season. An official database created by John Grasso detailing every NBL match possible (outside of two matches that the Kankakee Gallagher Trojans won over the Dayton Metropolitans in 1938) would be released in 2026 showcasing every team's official schedules throughout their time spent in the NBL. As such, these are the official results recorded for the Oshkosh All-Stars during their eighth season in the NBL.

#	Date	Opponent	Score	Record
1	November 25	Cleveland	47–44	1–0
2	November 29	Pittsburgh	41–43	1–1
3	December 2	Chicago	47–39	2–1
4	December 9	Fort Wayne	49–45	3–1
5	December 13	@ Cleveland	46–43	4–1
6	December 16	Cleveland	44–47	4–2
7	December 20	@ Chicago	46–52	4–3
8	December 23	Sheboygan	53–45	5–3
9	December 28	@ Sheboygan	37–43	5–4
10	December 30	Pittsburgh	55–50	6–4
11	January 6	Fort Wayne	45–58	6–5
12	January 7	@ Cleveland	51–53 (OT)	6–6
13	January 8	@ Pittsburgh	42–49	6–7
14	January 9	@ Fort Wayne	48–53 (OT)	6–8
15	January 13	Chicago	50–52	6–9
16	January 17	@ Chicago	36–43	6–10
17	January 18	@ Sheboygan	36–41	6–11
18	January 20	Sheboygan	41–44	6–12
19	January 27	Cleveland	47–44	7–12
20	January 28	@ Fort Wayne	40–46	7–13
21	February 2	N Pittsburgh	51–47	8–13
22	February 3	@ Pittsburgh	48–55	8–14
23	February 10	Chicago	51–47	9–14
24	February 11	@ Fort Wayne	54–62	9–15
25	February 13	@ Pittsburgh	55–44	10–15
26	February 14	@ Cleveland	44–43	11–15
27	February 17	Fort Wayne	53–55	11–16
28	February 21	@ Chicago	58–66	11–17
29	February 24	Sheboygan	48–44	12–17
30	February 25	@ Sheboygan	42–49	12–18

=== Awards and honors ===
- First Team All-NBL – Leroy Edwards
- NBL All-Time Team – Leroy Edwards
- All-Time Stars of Professional Basketball First Team – Leroy Edwards
- All-Time Stars of Professional Basketball Honorable Mention Team – Eddie Riska

== World Professional Basketball Tournament ==
For the seventh straight year in a row, the Oshkosh All-Stars would participate in the annual World Professional Basketball Tournament in Chicago, which the 1945 event was held on March 19–24, 1945 and was mostly held by independently ran teams alongside five of the six NBL teams this season (with the Sheboygan Red Skins being the only NBL team declining entry for this specific event this time around (potentially due to a tragic event involving the son of head coach Dutch Dehnert)) due in part to World War II. In the first round, Oshkosh would have a close match-up against the Detroit Mansfields, though they would ultimately defeat them with a 60–56 final score. In the quarterfinal round, the All-Stars would see themselves go up against one of two teams to get an automatic first round bye in this tournament due to their history for both the past WPBT they competed in and the repeat championship they recently won in this current NBL season, the Fort Wayne Zollner Pistons (with the other team that got a first round bye this year being the world famous (all-black) Harlem Globetrotters). While Oshkosh would manage to complete their quarterfinal game properly this time around after having issues doing so in the previous year's event against the Harlem Globetrotters, they would still end up being defeated by the repeating champion Zollner Pistons through a 63–52 defeat, with the All-Stars once again not having a single player be named a member of the All-Tournament Team this season (either for its first team or its second team). The Fort Wayne Zollner Pistons would later end up repeating as champions for both the NBL and the WPBT this season by blowing out both the all-black New York Renaissance in the semifinal round and the Dayton Acmes (a military-based team that was composed of servicemen players that were primarily from the American Basketball League and the New York Renaissance that were stationed at the Wright Field in Riverside, Ohio, including future Fort Wayne players Bruce Hale and John Mahnken, who were both named All-Tournament First Team members) in the championship round of the WPBT this year.

=== Games ===
- Won first round (60–56) over Detroit Mansfields
- Lost quarterfinal round (63–52) to Fort Wayne Zollner Pistons
