= 1944–45 Fort Wayne Zollner Pistons season =

Fourth season of the Pistons in the NBL (won NBL championship)

- NBL champions
- Division champions
- Head coach: Bobby McDermott
- Owner: Fred and Janet Zollner
- Arena: North Side High School Gym, Fort Wayne, Indiana

Results
- Record: 25–5 (.833)
- Place: Division: 1st (Eastern)
- Playoff finish: NBL champions (Won 3–2 over Sheboygan Red Skins)
- Stats at Basketball Reference

The 1944–45 Fort Wayne Zollner Pistons season was the fourth season of the franchise in the National Basketball League. This season was also the first season where the NBL disallowed the goaltending ability for defensive centers due to the rise of taller centers in the sport at hand; in previous seasons, the notion of a goaltending rule wasn't considered necessary since centers weren't seen as very tall players at the time and jumping above the rim was a very rare ability for players back then. The team was led by the star backcourt of two-time league MVP Bobby McDermott and Buddy Jeannette. The season ended with the Pistons winning a league best 25 out of 30 games and McDermott being awarded his third MVP award. As of 2026, this is still the best record in franchise history. The playoffs began with a 2–0 sweep over the Cleveland Allmen Transfers to make the team's fourth straight NBL Championship series. From there, they were met by the Sheboygan Red Skins for the third straight year. The series went to a full five games, with Sheboygan winning the first two, but ended with Fort Wayne defeating Sheboygan to successfully defend their NBL Championship in a reverse sweep. The Pistons would not return to the finals for another decade as the rebranded Fort Wayne Pistons and would not win another championship until the 1989 NBA Finals as the Detroit Pistons. At the end of the season Blackie Towery left the team to join the military for World War II, though he would return to the team one season later following the war's end.

In addition to repeating as champions of the NBL, the Fort Wayne Zollner Pistons also participated in the World Professional Basketball Tournament for the purposes of repeating as champions of the WPBT as well. Unlike the previous year's event, the Zollner Pistons would compete against another NBL team in the 1945 event with them going up against the Oshkosh All-Stars in the quarterfinal round. After beating Oshkosh in the quarterfinal round, they had a rematch against the independently ran New York Renaissance (this time blowing them out) in the semifinal round before competing in the championship match against the surprise team of the tournament, the also independently ran Dayton Acmes, who were composed of players from the American Basketball League and aforementioned New York Renaissance that were stationed at the Wright Field in Riverside, Ohio. Unlike their previous championship run in the WPBT, Fort Wayne would make easy competition out of their opponents throughout the entire tournament (with their lowest margin of victory being by eleven points against Oshkosh), which led to them being the only professional team to repeat as both NBL & WPBT champions in back-to-back seasons. Not only that, but their repeat WPBT championship success saw them complete their quartet of goals they had throughout the season which saw them wanting to beat the College All-Stars in what was (at the time considered to be) the annual College All-Star clash against a professional basketball squad where no professional team had beaten them yet (which Fort Wayne succeeded in with a 44–38 win over the College All Stars on December 1, 1944), wanting to lead the league for overall records once again, repeat as NBL champions, and repeat as WPBT champions, as well as later beating the NBL's All-Stars 59–47 in an exhibition match two nights after their WPBT championship match as a bonus success goal at hand.

== Roster ==
1944–45 Fort Wayne Zollner Pistons roster
Players

Pos.	No.	Player	Height	Weight	DOB	From
G		Paul Birch	6 ft 1 in (1.85 m)	190 lb (86 kg)	1910-01-04	Duquesne
F/C		Jerry Bush	6 ft 3 in (1.91 m)	200 lb (91 kg)	1914-09-06	St. John's
C		Jim Glass	6 ft 8 in (2.03 m)	210 lb (95 kg)	1919-09-10	Toledo
G/F		Dale Hamilton	6 ft 0 in (1.83 m)	180 lb (82 kg)	1919-08-16	Franklin (IN)
G		Buddy Jeannette	5 ft 11 in (1.80 m)	175 lb (79 kg)	1917-09-15	Washington & Jefferson
G	20	Bobby McDermott	5 ft 11 in (1.80 m)	180 lb (82 kg)	1914-01-07	Flushing HS (NY)
F/C		Jake Pelkington	6 ft 6 in (1.98 m)	220 lb (100 kg)	1916-01-03	Manhattan
G/F	27	Chick Reiser	5 ft 11 in (1.80 m)	165 lb (75 kg)	1914-12-17	NYU
C		Ed Sadowski	6 ft 5 in (1.96 m)	240 lb (109 kg)	1915-07-11	Seton Hall
G/F		Charley Shipp	6 ft 1 in (1.85 m)	200 lb (91 kg)	1913-12-03	Catholic
F/C		Bob Synnott	6 ft 3 in (1.91 m)	190 lb (86 kg)	1912-09-27	Theodore Roosevelt HS (NY)
F/C		Carlisle Towery	6 ft 4 in (1.93 m)	210 lb (95 kg)	1920-06-20	Western Kentucky

Coaches
Head coach

Bobby McDermott

Legend
- (DP) Unsigned draft pick
- (FA) Free agent
- (S) Suspended
- Injured

Roster

Note: Dale Hamilton and Carlisle Towery were not a part of the playoff roster this season due to them being enlisted in the U.S. military during this period of time since World War II was still going on by this time.

== Regular season ==
=== NBL Schedule ===
Not to be confused with exhibition or other non-NBL scheduled games that did not count towards Fort Wayne's official NBL record for this season. An official database created by John Grasso detailing every NBL match possible (outside of two matches that the Kankakee Gallagher Trojans won over the Dayton Metropolitans in 1938) would be released in 2026 showcasing every team's official schedules throughout their time spent in the NBL. As such, these are the official results recorded for the Fort Wayne Zollner Pistons during their fourth season in the NBL.

#	Date	Opponent	Score	Record
1	December 5	Cleveland	51–36	1–0
2	December 7	@ Sheboygan	55–49	2–0
3	December 9	@ Oshkosh	45–49	2–1
4	December 10	@ Cleveland	48–47 (OT)	3–1
5	December 12	Sheboygan	47–45	4–1
6	December 15	@ Pittsburgh	53–42	5–1
7	December 17	Pittsburgh	65–33	6–1
8	December 26	Chicago	59–50	7–1
9	January 2	Sheboygan	54–39	8–1
10	January 3	@ Chicago	73–64	9–1
11	January 6	@ Oshkosh	58–45	10–1
12	January 7	@ Sheboygan	55–54 (OT)	11–1
13	January 9	Oshkosh	53–48 (OT)	12–1
14	January 16	Chicago	59–49	13–1
15	January 21	@ Cleveland	73–58	14–1
16	January 23	Cleveland	50–42	15–1
17	January 24	@ Pittsburgh	55–41	16–1
18	January 27	@ Chicago	50–52	16–2
19	January 28	Oshkosh	46–40	17–2
20	January 30	Pittsburgh	63–53	18–2
21	February 4	Chicago	60–49	19–2
22	February 8	@ Cleveland	61–62	19–3
23	February 11	Oshkosh	62–54	20–3
24	February 14	@ Chicago	55–57	20–4
25	February 15	@ Sheboygan	53–70	20–5
26	February 17	@ Oshkosh	55–53	21–5
27	February 18	Sheboygan	64–52	22–5
28	February 24	@ Pittsburgh	55–53	23–5
29	February 25	Pittsburgh	63–62	24–5
30	March 4	Cleveland	68–58	25–5

=== Eastern Division ===
Pos.	Eastern Division	Wins	Losses	Win %
1	Fort Wayne Zollner Pistons	25	5	.833
2	Cleveland Allmen Transfers	13	17	.433
3	Pittsburgh Raiders	7	23	.233

=== Western Division ===
Pos.	Western Division	Wins	Losses	Win %
1	Sheboygan Red Skins	19	11	.633
2	Chicago American Gears	14	16	.467
3	Oshkosh All-Stars	12	18	.400

== NBL Playoffs ==
=== NBL Eastern Division Playoff ===
(1E) Fort Wayne Zollner Pistons vs. (2E) Cleveland Allmen Transfers: Fort Wayne wins series 2–0

- Game 1: March 6, 1945 @ Fort Wayne: Fort Wayne 78, Cleveland 50
- Game 2: March 8, 1945 @ Cleveland: Fort Wayne 58, Cleveland 51

=== NBL Championship ===
(1E) Fort Wayne Zollner Pistons vs. (1W) Sheboygan Red Skins: Fort Wayne wins series 3–2

- Game 1: March 11, 1945 @ Sheboygan: Sheboygan 65, Fort Wayne 53
- Game 2: March 12, 1945 @ Sheboygan: Sheboygan 50, Fort Wayne 47
- Game 3: March 15, 1945 @ Fort Wayne: Fort Wayne 58, Sheboygan 47
- Game 4: March 16, 1945 @ Fort Wayne: Fort Wayne 58, Sheboygan 41
- Game 5: March 18, 1945 @ Fort Wayne: Fort Wayne 59, Sheboygan 49

=== Awards and honors ===
- NBL Coach of the Year – Bobby McDermott
- NBL Most Valuable Player – Bobby McDermott
- First Team All-NBL – Bobby McDermott and Buddy Jeannette
- Second Team All-NBL – Jerry Bush and Jake Pelkington
- All-Time NBL Team – Bobby McDermott, Buddy Jeannette, Jerry Bush, and Charley Shipp
- All-Time Stars of Professional Basketball First Team – Bobby McDermott
- All-Time Stars of Professional Basketball Second Team – Buddy Jeannette and Jerry Bush
- All-Time Stars of Professional Basketball Honorable Mention Team – Curly Armstrong (not with team this season)

== World Professional Basketball Tournament ==
For the fifth year in a row (fourth in a row while representing the NBL), the Fort Wayne Zollner Pistons would participate in the annual World Professional Basketball Tournament in Chicago, which the 1945 event was held on March 19–24, 1945 and was mostly held by independently ran teams alongside every NBL team this season outside of the Sheboygan Red Skins due in part to World War II. The Zollner Pistons were given a first round bye alongside the world famous Harlem Globetrotters, with Fort Wayne's bye being due to them holding both the NBL's championship and the WPBT's championship from the previous year, to the point where they were named the favorites to the entire event this time around. The first match the Zollner Pistons competed in was against the Oshkosh All-Stars, the only NBL team that they'd go up against in the 1945 event, which Fort Wayne beat 63–52 in what turned out to be their hardest match of the event.

In the semifinal round, the Zollner Pistons had a semifinal rematch against the New York Renaissance, who sought revenge for last year's close defeat to Fort Wayne. Unfortunately for the Renaissance, despite them beating the NBL's Pittsburgh Raiders in the quarterfinal round, the Zollner Pistons would crush the Rens in their semifinal rematch, winning 65–48 for an easy rout into the championship match.

For the championship match, Fort Wayne saw themselves go up against another surprise team for the final round in the WPBT, this time being the independently ran Dayton Acmes, a team that was composed of servicemen players that were primarily from the American Basketball League and the New York Renaissance that were stationed at the Wright Field in Riverside, Ohio, including future Fort Wayne players Bruce Hale and John Mahnken, who were both named All-Tournament First Team members. Despite their surprising experience, which included them blowing out the NBL's Chicago American Gears in the semifinal round, who themselves upset the world-famous (all-black) Harlem Globetrotters in the quarterfinal round, the Zollner Pistons used their own fast-break pace to crush the Acmes, blowing out the independent/military-based Dayton squad 78–52 to become the only NBL team to repeat as both NBL & WPBT champions during both leagues' existences. This time around, Buddy Jeannette, who previously was named the WPBT's MVP in 1941 with the Detroit Eagles, was named the MVP once again for this year while with the Zollner Pistons, with four players (including Buddy) also being named members of the All-Tournament Team.

=== Scores ===
- Fort Wayne had a bye in the first round.
- Won quarterfinal round (63–52) over the Oshkosh All-Stars
- Won semifinal round (65–48) over the New York Renaissance
- Won championship round (50–33) over the Dayton Acmes

=== Awards and honors ===
- Buddy Jeannette, All-Tournament First Team, MVP
- Bobby McDermott, All-Tournament First Team
- Jerry Bush, All-Tournament Second Team
- Chick Reiser, All-Tournament Second Team
