= 1944–45 Cleveland Allmen Transfers season =

NBL professional basketball team season

- Head coach: Joseph J. Carlin
- Owner(s): Allmen Transfer & Moving Company
- Arena: Public Auditorium

Results
- Record: 13–17 (.433)
- Place: Division: 2nd (Eastern)
- Playoff finish: Lost Eastern Division Playoff to Fort Wayne Zollner Pistons, 2–0

The 1944–45 Cleveland Allmen Transfers season was the second professional season and first season of the Allmen Transfers playing in the United States' National Basketball League (NBL), which would also be the eighth year the NBL itself existed. However, if one were to count the seasons where they played as the Cleveland Chase Copper Brass team in the Amateur Athletic Union starting as early as 1935 back when the NBL technically first began as the Midwest Basketball Conference as well as their only NBL season when they played as the Cleveland Chase Brassmen, then this would officially be their tenth season of overall play. After their first professional season of play was considered a failure to the original owners and sponsors of the team, the Chase Brass and Copper Company, they ended up selling the ownership and team sponsorship rights to the more local Allmen Transfer & Moving Company, thus rebranding the team from the Cleveland Chase Brassmen to the Cleveland Allmen Transfers for the rest of their existence going forward. Due to the additions of the Chicago American Gears and Pittsburgh Raiders (the latter team being considered the return of the original Pittsburgh Pirates NBL team) for this season of play, the NBL returned to the Eastern and Western Division format of competition despite there being only three teams in each division this time around (primarily due to World War II).

Due to the combination of replacing their previous two player-coaches from the previous season as the Chase Brassmen with that of Joseph J. Carlin as the new head coach for Cleveland and the continued improvements of their star player, Mel Riebe, the Allmen Transfers would finish their season with an improved 13–17 record. While it would not produce a winning record for the Allmen Transfers squad, it would help them improve just enough to qualify for an Eastern Division playoff spot in the NBL Playoffs over the rebranded returning Pittsburgh Raiders, with them also having their best record in franchise history to boot. Unfortunately for the since rebranded Cleveland squad, they would have to compete against the defending NBL (and WPBT) champions in the Fort Wayne Zollner Pistons for a shot at the NBL championship this season, and much like their first season in the NBL when they played as the Chase Brassmen, the Allmen Transfers would be swept 2–0 by the Zollner Pistons in their route to a repeat championship in both the NBL and the WPBT.

This season would also be notable for Mel Riebe leading the league in scoring for the second straight season in a row (as well as joining Bobby McDermott as the first players in NBL history to average over 20 points per game in a season), as well as became a member of the All-NBL First Team once again.

== Roster ==
Please note that due to the way records for professional basketball leagues like the NBL and the ABL were recorded at the time, some information on both teams and players may be harder to list out than usual here.

Player	Position
Tom Becker	F
Mike Bytzura	F
Ned Endress	G-F
Frank Garcia	G-F
Paul Kessy	F-C
Johnny Malokas	G
John Mills	C
Bill Riebe	G
Mel Riebe	G-F
Steve Sitko	G
Don Warnke	C
Herm Weiss	G
Tom Wukovits	G

Note: Tom Becker, Paul Kessy, Johnny Malokas, Steve Sitko, Don Warnke, and Herm Weiss would not play in the NBL Playoffs. Not only that, but Ned Endress would be replaced by a center from Western Reserve named John Blair during the 1945 World Professional Basketball Tournament.

== Regular season ==
=== NBL Schedule ===
An official database created by John Grasso detailing every NBL match possible (outside of two matches that the Kankakee Gallagher Trojans won over the Dayton Metropolitans in 1938) would be released in 2026 showcasing every team's official schedules throughout their time spent in the NBL. As such, these are the official results recorded for the Cleveland Allmen Transfers during their second season in the NBL and their first NBL season under that specific team name.

- November 25, 1944 @ Oshkosh, WI: Cleveland Allmen Transfers 44, Oshkosh All-Stars 47
- December 3, 1944 @ Cleveland, OH: Pittsburgh Raiders 53, Cleveland Allmen Transfers 54
- December 5, 1944 @ Fort Wayne, IN: Cleveland Allmen Transfers 36, Fort Wayne Zollner Pistons 51
- December 6, 1944 @ Pittsburgh, PA: Cleveland Allmen Transfers 53, Pittsburgh Raiders 55
- December 10, 1944: Fort Wayne Zollner Pistons 48, Cleveland Allmen Transfers 47 (OT @ Cleveland, OH)
- December 13, 1944 @ Cleveland, OH: Oshkosh All-Stars 46, Cleveland Allmen Transfers 43
- December 16, 1944 @ Oshkosh, WI: Cleveland Allmen Transfers 47, Oshkosh All-Stars 44
- December 17, 1944: Cleveland Allmen Transfers 45, Sheboygan Red Skins 47 (OT @ Sheboygan, WI)
- December 19, 1944 @ Cleveland, OH: Sheboygan Red Skins 55, Cleveland Allmen Transfers 44
- December 23, 1944 @ Chicago, IL: Cleveland Allmen Transfers 42, Chicago American Gears 51
- December 25, 1943 @ Cleveland, OH: Chicago American Gears 47, Cleveland Allmen Transfers 64
- January 3, 1945 @ Cleveland, OH: Sheboygan Red Skins 76, Cleveland Allmen Transfers 57
- January 7, 1945: Oshkosh All-Stars 51, Cleveland Allmen Transfers 53 (OT @ Cleveland, OH)
- January 13, 1945 @ Pittsburgh, PA: Cleveland Allmen Transfers 42, Pittsburgh Raiders 48
- January 14, 1945 @ Cleveland, OH: Chicago American Gears 49, Cleveland Allmen Transfers 62
- January 18, 1945 @ Cleveland, OH: Pittsburgh Raiders 43, Cleveland Allmen Transfers 57
- January 21, 1945 @ Cleveland, OH: Fort Wayne Zollner Pistons 73, Cleveland Allmen Transfers 58
- January 23, 1945 @ Fort Wayne, IN: Fort Wayne Zollner Pistons 50, Cleveland Allmen Transfers 42
- January 24, 1945 @ Chicago, IL: Cleveland Allmen Transfers 50, Chicago American Gears 59
- January 25, 1945 @ Sheboygan, WI: Cleveland Allmen Transfers 37, Sheboygan Red Skins 50
- January 27, 1945 @ Oshkosh, WI: Cleveland Allmen Transfers 44, Oshkosh All-Stars 47
- February 3, 1945 @ Chicago, IL: Cleveland Allmen Transfers 66, Chicago American Gears 40
- February 4, 1945 @ Sheboygan, WI: Cleveland Allmen Transfers 48, Sheboygan Red Skins 42
- February 8, 1945 @ Cleveland, OH: Fort Wayne Zollner Pistons 61, Cleveland Allmen Transfers 62
- February 11, 1945 @ Cleveland, OH: Pittsburgh Raiders 48, Cleveland Allmen Transfers 50
- February 14, 1945 @ Cleveland, OH: Oshkosh All-Stars 44, Cleveland Allmen Transfers 43
- February 19, 1945 @ Cleveland, OH: Sheboygan Red Skins 41, Cleveland Allmen Transfers 51
- February 25, 1945 @ Cleveland, OH: Chicago American Gears 46, Cleveland Allmen Transfers 57
- February 28, 1945 @ Pittsburgh, PA: Cleveland Allmen Transfers 73, Pittsburgh Raiders 49
- March 4, 1945 @ Fort Wayne, IN: Cleveland Allmen Transfers 58, Fort Wayne Zollner Pistons 68

=== Season standings ===
Pos.	Eastern Division	Wins	Losses	Win %
1	Fort Wayne Zollner Pistons	25	5	.833
2	Cleveland Allmen Transfers	13	17	.433
3	Pittsburgh Raiders	7	23	.233

== NBL Playoffs ==
=== NBL Eastern Division Playoff ===
(2E) Cleveland Allmen Transfers vs. (1E) Fort Wayne Zollner Pistons: Fort Wayne wins series 2–0

- Game 1: March 6, 1944 @ Fort Wayne: Fort Wayne 78, Cleveland 50
- Game 2: March 8, 1944 @ Cleveland: Fort Wayne 58, Cleveland 51

== Awards and honors ==
- All-NBL First Team – Mel Riebe
- NBL All-Time Team – Mel Riebe
- All-Time Stars of Professional Basketball Second Team – Wee Willie Smith (not with team this season)

== World Professional Basketball Tournament ==
For the first time when using the Allmen Transfers name and second overall time after previously going by the Cleveland Chase Brassmen, the Cleveland Allmen Transfers would enter the annual World Professional Basketball Tournament in Chicago, which the 1945 event was held on March 19–24, 1945 and was mostly held by independently ran teams alongside every NBL team from this season outside of the Sheboygan Red Skins due in part to World War II. In the first round, the Allmen Transfers would compete against the Midland Dow Chemicals, who much like the Cleveland franchise before them were once an Amateur Athletic Union franchise in the past, though the Midland franchise ended up becoming an independent works team owned and operated by the Dow Chemical Company in Midland, Michigan instead. Despite the Allmen Transfers appearing to be the better team on paper due to their better overall record this season (with Mel Riebe still being the best scorer of the team, followed by rookie Mike Bytzura in their first round match), they would still end up getting beaten and upset by the Midland Dow Chemicals (being led by Harvey Martens and Slim Wintermute) with a 61–46 beatdown, which would end Cleveland's tournament run early. Midland would later get eliminated in a very close match to the Dayton Acmes (an independent team that was composed of servicemen players that were primarily from the American Basketball League and the New York Renaissance that were stationed at the Wright Field in Riverside, Ohio), who themselves ended up going all the way to the championship match of the tournament before losing to the eventual champions in the Fort Wayne Zollner Pistons to result in the Fort Wayne squad being the only repeat champions in both the NBL and the WPBT.

=== Game played ===
- Lost first round (46–61) to the Midland Dow Chemicals
