= Vukošić =

Vukošić may refer to:

- Vukošić, Vladimirci, a village in Serbia
- Frank Vukosic (1915–1989), American basketball player
- Goran Vukošić, Montenegrin singer
