= 1955–56 Georgetown Hoyas men's basketball team =

American college basketball season

1955–56 Georgetown Hoyas men's basketball
- Conference: Independent
- Record: 13–11
- Head coach: Harry "Buddy" Jeannette (4th season)
- Assistant coach: Hugh Beins (3rd season)
- Captain: Jack Walsh
- Home arena: McDonough Gymnasium

The 1955–56 Georgetown Hoyas men's basketball team represented Georgetown University during the 1955–56 NCAA college basketball season. Harry "Buddy" Jeannette coached them in his fourth and final season as head coach. The team was an independent and played its home games at McDonough Gymnasium on the Georgetown campus in Washington, D.C. The team finished with a record of 13–11 and had no post-season play.

== Season recap ==
Forward Warren Buehler had been the team's top scorer the previous season, but took a leave of absence from the team this season to recover from an injury. With Buehler out, junior forward Joe Missett took the lead, scoring in double figures in all but one game and averaging 18.3 points and 13.5 rebounds per game. The team's top scorer for the year, he also had 325 rebounds, a total unmatched in Georgetown history except by Merlin Wilson, who played center for the Hoyas from 1972 to 1976.

Sophomore forward Ken Pichette joined the varsity after a successful season with the freshman team the previous year. Based on his freshman performance, he was expected to take the lead in scoring for the varsity team this season with Buehler out for the year, but he got off to a slow start, not scoring until his fifth game. However, he began to score steadily in January 1956, and he scored in double figures in 13 of the final 14 games of the year.

Junior forward Matt White competed with Pichette and senior forward Jack Walsh for a starting position, but he became a valuable scorer when he proved able to play effectively as a guard as well as a forward. His 24 points against Morehead State late in the season were his career high.

The team finished with a record of 13–11, the only winning season for Georgetown between 1952–53 and 1961–62. It had no postseason play and was not ranked in the Top 20 in the Associated Press Poll or Coaches' Poll at any time.

In his first season, Buddy Jeannette had led Georgetown to its first-ever berth in the National Invitation Tournament; it also was only the second post-season tournament appearance in Georgetown men's basketball history and the first since the 1942–43 Hoyas played in the 1943 NCAA Tournament. A combination of injuries and academic losses led to disappointment over the next three years, and he resigned at the end of this season, departing with no other post-season tournament appearances, two winning seasons, and an overall record of 49-49 during his four-season tenure. He would later serve as head coach of the National Basketball Association's Baltimore Bullets for the 1964–65 season, as their interim head coach for part of the 1966–67 season, and as head coach of the American Basketball Association's Pittsburgh Pipers for part of the 1969–70 season.

== Roster ==
#	Name	Height	Weight (lbs.)	Position	Class	Hometown	Previous Team(s)
5	Joe Titus	N/A	N/A	F	So.	Bradford, PA, U.S.	Bradford Area HS
8	John Clark	6'2"	N/A	G	So.	Binghamton, NY, U.S.	Saint Patrick HS
9	Dick Percudani	6'1"	N/A	G	Jr.	Elmhurst, NY, U.S.	Power Memorial Academy
11	John Morchower	6'7"	N/A	G	Sr.	Bayonne, NJ, U.S.	Sweeney HS
12	Joe Bolger	6'3"	N/A	G	Sr.	New York, NY, U.S.	Xavier HS
14	Dale Smith	6'4"	N/A	G	Jr.	Allentown, PA, U.S.	Allentown Central Catholic HS
15	Leo Phillips	6'5"	N/A	F	Jr.	York, PA, U.S.	William Penn HS
17	Ken Pichette	6'3"	185	F	So.	Binghamton, NY, U.S.	Central HS
18	Richard Wagner	6'2"	N/A	G	Jr.	Glendale, NY, U.S.	St. John's Preparatory School
20	Jack Walsh	5'11"	N/A	F	Sr.	New York, NY, U.S.	Brooklyn Preparatory School
21	Dale Seymour	6'5"	N/A	G	Jr.	Washington, DC, U.S.	Gonzaga College HS
22	Joe Missett	6"7"	205	C	Jr.	Villanova, PA, U.S.	Malvern Preparatory School
23	Ray Mazza	6'0"	N/A	G	Jr.	Cincinnati, OH, U.S.	St. Xavier HS
24	Matt White	6'2"	205	F	Jr.	New York, NY, U.S.	La Salle HS
27	Ken Rode	6'4"	N/A	F	Jr.	New York, NY, U.S.	St. Francis Preparatory School

== 1955–56 schedule and results ==
Date time, TV	Rank^{#}	Opponent^{#}	Result	Record	Site city, state
Regular Season
Thu., Dec. 1, 1955 no, no		American	W 60–58	1-0	McDonough Gymnasium; Washington, DC
Sat., Dec. 3, 1955 no, no		Roanoke	W 74–63	2-0	McDonough Gymnasium; Washington, DC
Thu., Dec. 8, 1955 no, no		at New York University	L 69–74	2-1	Madison Square Garden; New York, NY
Sat., Dec. 10, 1955 no, no		at Mount St. Mary's	W 85–78	3-1	Alumni Gymnasium; Emmitsburg, MD
Wed., Dec. 14, 1955 no, no		Morris Harvey	W 74–66	4-1	McDonough Gymnasium; Washington, DC
Fri., Dec. 16, 1955 no, no		at New York Athletic Club	L 73–74	exhibition	New York Athletic Club Gymnasium; New York, NY
Sat., Dec. 17, 1955 no, no		at Siena	L 50–53	4-2	Washington Avenue Armory; Albany, NY
Sun., Dec. 18, 1955 no, no		vs. St. Bonaventure; Queen City Tournament	L 52–79	4-3	Buffalo Memorial Auditorium; Buffalo, NY
Mon., Dec. 19, 1955 no, no		vs. Niagara; Queen City Tournament	L 53–68	4-4	Buffalo Memorial Auditorium; Buffalo, NY
Sat., Jan. 7, 1956 no, no		Loyola Maryland	W 78–66	5-4	McDonough Gymnasium; Washington, DC
Wed., Jan. 11, 1956 no, no		at American	W 82–66	6-4	Clendenen Gymnasium; Washington, DC
Sat., Jan. 14, 1956 no, no		at Seton Hall	L 85–87	6-5	Walsh Gymnasium; South Orange, NJ
Sat., Jan. 21, 1956 no, no		Maryland	L 57–62	6-6	McDonough Gymnasium; Washington, DC
Fri., Jan. 27, 1956 no, no		at Saint Peter's	W 82–69	7-6	Jersey City Armory; Jersey City, NJ
Sat., Jan. 28, 1956 no, no		vs. Providence	W 77–51	8-6	Alumni Gymnasium; Baltimore, MD
Mon., Jan. 30, 1956 no, no		at No. 11 Holy Cross	L 68–88	8-7	Worcester Memorial Auditorium; Worcester, MA
Wed., Feb. 1, 1956 no, no		St. Joseph's	W 84–72	9-7	McDonough Gymnasium; Washington, DC
Sat., Feb. 4, 1956 no, no		at La Salle	W 67–63	10-7	Philadelphia Convention Hall; Philadelphia, PA
Wed., Feb. 8, 1956 no, no		Mount St. Mary's	W 86–83	11-7	McDonough Gymnasium; Washington, DC
Sat., Feb. 11, 1956 no, no		at Fordham	L 68–69	11-8	Rose Hill Gymnasium; Bronx, NY
Mon., Feb. 13, 1956 no, no		Spring Hill	W 75–57	12-8	McDonough Gymnasium; Washington, DC
Sat., Feb. 18, 1956 no, no		Morehead State	W 84–79	13-8	McDonough Gymnasium; Washington, DC
Tue., Feb. 21, 1956 no, no		No. 19 George Washington	L 67–70	13-9	McDonough Gymnasium; Washington, DC
Sat., Feb. 25, 1956 no, no		at Maryland	L 61–72	13-10	Cole Field House; College Park, MD
Tue., Feb. 28, 1956 no, no		at George Washington	L 77–93	13-11	Uline Arena; Washington, DC
*Non-conference game. ^{#}Rankings from AP Poll. (#) Tournament seedings in parentheses.
