= Bobby Neu =

American basketball player

Personal information
- Born: June 28, 1917
- Died: February 7, 1971 (aged 53) Elmhurst, Illinois
- Listed height: 6 ft 1 in (1.85 m)
- Listed weight: 170 lb (77 kg)

Career information
- High school: St. Mel's (Chicago, Illinois)
- College: DePaul (1936–1939)
- Playing career: 1939–1946
- Position: Shooting guard / small forward

Career history
- 1939–1941: Hammond Ciesar All-Americans
- 1944–1945: Pittsburgh Raiders
- 1945–1946: Chicago American Gears

Career highlights
- All-NBL Second Team (1941); First-team All-American – MSG (1939); Second-team All-American – MSG (1938)

Robert J. Neu (June 28, 1917 – February 7, 1971) was an American basketball player. He played four seasons in the American National Basketball League, a forerunner to the modern National Basketball Association (NBA).

Neu, who was of German descent, played high school basketball at St. Mel High School in Chicago, Illinois. He then played college basketball for hometown DePaul University, where he was an All-American in his junior and senior seasons.

Following his college career, he played professionally in the NBL. He spent two seasons with the Hammond Ciesar All-Americans, earning second-team All-NBL honors in 1941. He then spent three years in the military during World War II. Upon returning from the service, Neu played two more seasons in the NBL for the Pittsburgh Raiders and Chicago American Gears. For his NBL career, Neu averaged 6.7 points over 80 games.
