= Joe Proksa =

American basketball player

Personal information
- Born: June 30, 1914 Pennsylvania, U.S.
- Died: October 25, 1999 (aged 85) Hagerstown, Maryland, U.S.
- Listed height: 6 ft 1 in (1.85 m)
- Listed weight: 185 lb (84 kg)

Career information
- College: Penn State (1935–1938)
- Position: Guard
- Number: 1944
- Coaching career: 1949–1970

Career history

Playing
- 1939–1940: Westinghouse Air Brake Five
- 194?–194?: Conono Oilers
- 194?–194?: North End
- 1944: Pittsburgh Raiders

Coaching
- 1949–1950: Coatesville HS
- 1962–1970: North Hagerstown HS

Joseph P. Proksa (June 30, 1914 – October 25, 1999) was an American professional basketball player. Proksa played in the National Basketball League for one game, appearing for the Pittsburgh Raiders during the 1944–45 season. Later, he coached high school basketball in Pennsylvania and in Maryland.
