= Al Schrecker =

American basketball player (1917–2000)

Personal information
- Born: July 23, 1917 Pittsburgh, Pennsylvania, U.S.
- Died: January 4, 2000 (aged 82) Allison Park, Pennsylvania, U.S.
- Listed height: 6 ft 1 in (1.85 m)
- Listed weight: 160 lb (73 kg)

Career information
- Playing career: 1938–1944
- Position: Forward

Career history
- 1938–1939: Pittsburgh
- 1942–1943: YMHA
- 1944: Pittsburgh Raiders

Albert L. Schrecker (July 23, 1917 – January 4, 2000) was an American professional basketball player. Schrecker, a native of Pittsburgh, Pennsylvania, played in the National Basketball League in one game for the Pittsburgh Raiders during the 1944–45 season. He scored seven points in his lone appearance.
