= Jack Scarry =

American basketball player

Personal information
- Born: May 29, 1917 Duquesne, Pennsylvania, U.S.
- Died: November 3, 1983 (aged 66) Palos Park, Illinois, U.S.
- Listed height: 6 ft 3 in (1.91 m)
- Listed weight: 195 lb (88 kg)

Career information
- College: Duquesne (1937–1940)
- Position: Power forward / center

Career history
- 1945: Pittsburgh Raiders

John L. Scarry (May 29, 1917 – November 3, 1983) was an American professional basketball player. Scarry played in the National Basketball League for the Pittsburgh Raiders during the 1944–45 season. In six career games, he averaged 1.2 points per game. Jack Scarry was the brother of professional football player Mike Scarry.
