= Chet Strumillo =

American basketball player

Personal information
- Born: May 28, 1924 Cicero, Illinois, U.S.
- Died: July 27, 2010 (aged 86) Burr Ridge, Illinois, U.S.
- Listed height: 5 ft 11 in (1.80 m)
- Listed weight: 175 lb (79 kg)

Career information
- High school: J. Sterling Morton (Cicero, Illinois)
- College: Northwestern (1946–1949)
- NBA draft: 1949: undrafted
- Position: Forward

Career history
- 1944: Chicago American Gears

Chester William Strumillo (May 28, 1924 – July 27, 2010) was an American professional basketball player. He appeared in one game for the Chicago American Gears in the National Basketball League during the 1944–45 season.

In college, Strumillo attended the University of Illinois and played on their freshman basketball team in 1940–41, but was then drafted into the Army to fight in World War II. Upon returning he resumed his collegiate basketball play for Northwestern University's varsity team between 1946 and 1949.
