= Sid Levine =

American basketball player

Personal information
- Born: July 9, 1918 Pittsburgh, Pennsylvania
- Died: June 10, 1999 (aged 80) Pittsburgh, Pennsylvania
- Listed height: 5 ft 7 in (1.70 m)
- Listed weight: 185 lb (84 kg)

Career information
- High school: Fifth Avenue (Pittsburgh, Pennsylvania)
- Position: Guard

Career history
- 1944–1945: Pittsburgh Raiders

Sidney Levine (July 9, 1918 – June 10, 1999) was an American professional basketball player. Levine played in the National Basketball League for the Pittsburgh Raiders during the 1944–45 season. He appeared in 18 games and averaged 0.5 points per game.
