= Ralph Churchfield =

American basketball player

Personal information
- Born: January 1, 1918 Pennsylvania, U.S.
- Died: October 7, 1995 (aged 77) North Versailles, Pennsylvania, U.S.
- Listed height: 6 ft 5 in (1.96 m)
- Listed weight: 220 lb (100 kg)

Career information
- High school: East Pittsburgh; (Pittsburgh, Pennsylvania)
- College: Washington & Jefferson (1935–1937)
- Position: Shooting guard / small forward

Career history

Playing
- 193?–19??: Switchgear
- 19??–194?: Westinghouse AA
- 194?–194?: East Pittsburgh Pirates
- 1944–1945: Pittsburgh Raiders

Coaching
- 1946–1947: Donora Pirates
- 1948–1952: St. Thomas HS

Ralph Lester Churchfield (January 1, 1918 – October 7, 1995) was an American professional basketball player. Churchfield played in the National Basketball League for the Pittsburgh Raiders in 1944–45 and averaged 3.4 points per game.
