= John Novotny =

American basketball player

Personal information
- Born: January 29, 1918 Braddock, Pennsylvania, U.S.
- Died: July 14, 2006 (aged 88) Jeannette, Pennsylvania, U.S.
- Listed height: 5 ft 10 in (1.78 m)
- Listed weight: 165 lb (75 kg)

Career information
- High school: Braddock (Braddock, Pennsylvania)
- College: Appalachian State (1939–1942)
- Position: Guard

Career history
- 1945: Pittsburgh Raiders

John Robert Novotny (January 29, 1918 – July 14, 2006) was an American professional basketball player. Novotny played in the National Basketball League for one game, appearing for the Pittsburgh Raiders during the 1944–45 season. He played college basketball at Appalachian State University.
