= Johnny Stevenson =

American basketball player

Personal information
- Born: May 25, 1913
- Died: April 1, 1998 (aged 84)
- Listed height: 5 ft 6 in (1.68 m)
- Position: Guard

Career history
- 1944: Pittsburgh Raiders

John Henry Stevenson (May 25, 1913 – April 1, 1998) was an American professional basketball player. He played in the National Basketball League in one game for the Pittsburgh Raiders during the 1944–45 season. He scored four points in his lone appearance.
