= Freddie Crum =

American basketball player (1912–1987)

Personal information
- Born: December 3, 1912 Pennsylvania, U.S.
- Died: July 11, 1987 (aged 74) Pittsburgh, Pennsylvania, U.S.
- Listed height: 6 ft 0 in (1.83 m)
- Listed weight: 170 lb (77 kg)

Career information
- High school: Schenley (Pittsburgh, Pennsylvania)
- Playing career: 1934–1945
- Position: Shooting guard / small forward

Career history

Playing
- 1934–1935: McKeesport Willies
- 1936–1936: Wilmerding YMCA
- 1939: Cardon Big Five
- 1939–1940: Westinghouse Air Brake Five
- 1944–1945: Pittsburgh Raiders

Coaching
- 1939–1940: Westinghouse Air Brake Five

Fred W. Crum (December 3, 1912 – July 11, 1987) was an American professional basketball player. Churchfield played in the National Basketball League for the Pittsburgh Raiders in 1944–45 and averaged 5.8 points per game. Crum was an alternate for the 1936 United States men's Olympic basketball team.
