= Johnny Malokas =

American basketball player

Personal information
- Born: August 1, 1916 Cleveland, Ohio, U.S.
- Died: April 16, 2000 (aged 83) Euclid, Ohio, U.S.
- Listed height: 5 ft 11 in (1.80 m)
- Listed weight: 195 lb (88 kg)

Career information
- College: Ohio (1935–1938)
- Playing career: 1938–1947
- Position: Guard

Career history
- 1938–1943: Cleveland Chase Brass Coppers
- 1944–1946: Cleveland Allmen Transfers
- 1946–1947: Cleveland Rosenblums

Career highlights
- 2× First-team All-Buckeye (1937, 1938); Second-team All-Buckeye (1936)

John Thomas Malokas (August 1, 1916 – April 16, 2000) was an American basketball player. He played college basketball for Ohio University and later professionally in the National Basketball League for the Cleveland Allmen Transfers. He also played for the Cleveland Chase Brassmen back when they both played in the Amateur Athletic Union and were an independent traveling team under their original team name of the Cleveland Chase Brass Coppers, as well as the Cleveland Rosenblums as members in the American Basketball League.

== College career ==
In 1936, Malokas was an Buckeye Conference All-second team selection and a first team selection in 1937 and 1938. In 1970, he was elected to the Ohio University Athletic Hall of Fame.
