= Hal Hutcheson =

American basketball player (1920–1991)

Personal information
- Born: May 16, 1920 Hopkins, Missouri
- Died: September 17, 1991 (aged 71) Grand Junction, Colorado
- Listed height: 6 ft 5 in (1.96 m)
- Listed weight: 190 lb (86 kg)

Career information
- College: Northwest Missouri State (1939–1941)
- Position: Guard / forward

Career history

Playing
- 1941–1942: Maryville Leadways
- 1945–1946: Continental Airlines (Denver)
- 1946–1947: Continental Airlines (Oklahoma City)
- 1947–1948: St. Joseph Outlaws
- 1948–1949: Denver Nuggets
- 1950–1951: Kansas City Hi-Spots

Coaching
- 1947–1948: St. Joseph Outlaws

Harold Thomas Hutcheson (May 16, 1920 – September 17, 1991) was an American professional basketball player. He played for the Denver Nuggets in the National Basketball League during the 1948–49 season and averaged 4.5 points per game.
