= Herm Weiss =

American basketball player

Personal information
- Born: July 22, 1916 Cleveland, Ohio, U.S.
- Died: September 6, 1976 (aged 60) New York City, New York, U.S.

Career information
- College: Case Western (1936–1939)
- Position: Guard

Career history
- 1944: Cleveland Allmen Transfers

Herman Leonard Weiss Jr. (July 22, 1916 – September 6, 1976) was an American professional basketball player. He played in the National Basketball League in just three games for the Cleveland Allmen Transfers during the 1944–45 season. After basketball he worked for General Electric for many years. In 1976 Weiss died from cancer.
