= 1954–55 Georgetown Hoyas men's basketball team =

American college basketball season

1954–55 Georgetown Hoyas men's basketball
- Conference: Independent
- Record: 12–13
- Head coach: Harry "Buddy" Jeannette (3rd season)
- Assistant coach: Hugh Beins (2nd season)
- Captain: Game captains
- Home arena: McDonough Gymnasium

The 1954–55 Georgetown Hoyas men's basketball team represented Georgetown University during the 1954–55 NCAA college basketball season. Harry "Buddy" Jeannette coached them in his third season as head coach. The team was an independent and played its home games at McDonough Gymnasium on the Georgetown campus in Washington, D.C. It finished with a record of 12–13 and had no post-season play.

== Season recap ==
Sophomore forward Matt White joined the varsity team this year after a year on the freshman team. He scored in double figures eight times, including a season-high 22 in an upset of Fordham in the opening game of the Queen City Tournament in Buffalo, New York. He averaged 11.2 points per game, but his year came to an abrupt end when, with seven games remaining, he was among four players suspended for the rest of the season for violating team rules during a road trip.

Junior forward Warren Buehler had his second consecutive strong offensive season, scoring in double figures in 21 of the season's 25 games. For the second year in a row, the team lost one of its top scorers to an academic suspension at midseason, but Buehler compensated with ever-greater offensive performances, scoring in double figures in 15 of the final 16 games, including a season-high 31 points against Seton Hall. He ended the season as the team's top scorer for the second straight year.

Like White, sophomore center Joe Missett came to the varsity from the freshman team. He played in 20 of the season's 25 games and proved a capable center who could open up scoring opportunities for forwards Buehler and White. He scored a season-high 22 points against New York University and finished the season averaging 9.3 rebounds per game and as the team' second-highest scorer after Buehler.

The 1954–55 team opened the season at 9-3, but the various player suspensions affected its performance later in the year, and it lost 10 of its last 13 games and eight of its last ten. It finished the season with a record of 12–13, had no postseason play, and was not ranked in the Top 20 in the Associated Press Poll or Coaches' Poll at any time.

== Roster ==
#	Name	Height	Weight (lbs.)	Position	Class	Hometown	Previous Team(s)
5	Warren Buehler	6"4"	185	F	Jr.	Bayonne, New Jersey, U.S.	Sweeney HS
6	Hank Morano	6'2"	N/A	G	So.	Union City, New Jersey, U.S.	St. Peter's Preparatory School
9	Dick Percudani	6'1"	N/A	G	So.	Elmhurst, New York, U.S.	Power Memorial Academy
11	John Morchower	6'7"	N/A	G	Jr.	Bayonne, New Jersey, U.S.	Sweeney HS
12	Joe Bolger	6'3"	N/A	G	Jr.	New York, New York, U.S.	Xavier HS
14	Dale Smith	6'4"	N/A	G	So.	Allentown, Pennsylvania, U.S.	Catholic HS
15	Tucker Dunn	5'9"	N/A	G	So.	N/A	N/A
18	Richard Wagner	6'2"	N/A	G	So.	Glendale, New York, U.S.	St. John's Preparatory School
20	Jack Walsh	5'11"	N/A	F	Jr.	New York, New York, U.S.	Brooklyn Preparatory School
21	Dale Seymour	6'5"	N/A	G	So.	Washington, D.C., U.S.	Gonzaga College HS
22	Joe Missett	6"7"	205	C	So.	Villanova, Pennsylvania, U.S.	Malvern Preparatory School
23	Ray Mazza	6'0"	N/A	G	So.	Cincinnati, Ohio, U.S.	St. Xavier HS
24	Matt White	6'2"	205	F	So.	New York, New York, U.S.	La Salle Academy HS
27	Ken Rode	6'4"	N/A	F	So.	New York, New York, U.S.	St. Francis Preparatory School

== 1954–55 schedule and results ==
Date time, TV	Rank^{#}	Opponent^{#}	Result	Record	Site city, state
Regular Season
Wed., Dec. 1, 1954 no, no		Loyola Maryland	W 74–63	1-0	Alumni Gymnasium; Baltimore, Maryland
Sat., Dec. 4, 1954 no, no		at Maryland	L 43–60	1-1	Ritchie Coliseum; College Park, Maryland
Tue., Dec. 7, 1954 no, no		American	W 65–61	2-1	McDonough Gymnasium; Washington, D.C.
Sat., Dec. 11, 1954 no, no		Saint Peter's	W 77–68	3-1	McDonough Gymnasium; Washington, D.C.
Wed., Dec. 15, 1954 no, no		Mount St. Mary's	W 76–74	4-1	McDonough Gymnasium; Washington, D.C.
Sat., Dec. 18, 1954 no, no		at St. Joseph's	W 61–53	5-1	Philadelphia Convention Hall; Philadelphia, Pennsylvania
Mon., Dec. 27, 1954 no, no		vs. Fordham; Queen City Tournament	W 71–70	6-1	Buffalo Memorial Auditorium; Buffalo, New York
Tue., Dec. 28, 1954 no, no		vs. St. Bonaventure; Queen City Tournament	L 59–66	6-2	Buffalo Memorial Auditorium; Buffalo, New York
Wed., Dec. 29, 1954 no, no		vs. Georgia Tech; Queen City Tournament	W 68–62	7-2	Buffalo Memorial Auditorium; Buffalo, New York
Wed., Jan. 5, 1955 no, no		No. 6 George Washington	L 55–74	7-3	McDonough Gymnasium; Washington, D.C.
Sat., Jan. 8, 1955 no, no		at American	W 79–65	8-3	Clendenen Gymnasium; Washington, D.C.
Tue., Jan. 11, 1955 no, no		at New York University	W 71–67	9-3	Madison Square Garden; New York, New York
Mon., Jan. 24, 1955 no, no		at Miami	L 81–84	9-4	N/A; Miami, Florida
Wed., Jan. 26, 1955 no, no		at Southern Mississippi	L 65–67	9-5	N/A; Hattiesburg, Mississippi
Fri., Jan. 28, 1955 no, no		at No. 11 Spring Hill	W 82–75 ^{4OT}	10-5	N/A; Mobile, Alabama
Sun., Jan. 30, 1955 no, no		at Loyola New Orleans	L 68–69 ^{OT}	10-6	Loyola Field House; New Orleans, Louisiana
Wed., Feb. 2, 1955 no, no		No. 3 La Salle	L 58–85	10-7	McDonough Gymnasium; Washington, D.C.
Sat., Feb. 5, 1955 no, no		at No. 3 La Salle	L 46–74	10-8	Philadelphia Convention Hall; Philadelphia, Pennsylvania
Wed., Feb. 9, 1955 no, no		No. 19 Villanova	W 84–79	11-8	McDonough Gymnasium; Washington, D.C.
Sat., Feb. 12, 1955 no, no		Fordham	L 58–62	11-9	McDonough Gymnasium; Washington, D.C.
Tue., Feb. 15, 1955 (Note: The Georgetown Basketball History Project lists the Seton Hall and Mount St. Mary's games as both taking place on February 15, 1955.) no, no		Seton Hall	W 76–73	12-9	McDonough Gymnasium; Washington, D.C.
Tue., Feb. 15, 1955 no, no		Mount St. Mary's	L 67–70	12-10	Alumni Gymnasium; Emmitsburg, Maryland
Sat., Feb. 19, 1955 no, no		at Navy	L 54–77	12-11	Halsey Field House; Annapolis, Maryland
Thu., Feb. 24, 1955 no, no		No. 17 Maryland	L 49–57	12-12	McDonough Gymnasium; Washington, D.C.
Tue., Mar. 1, 1955 no, no		at No. 13 George Washington	L 67–80	12-13	Uline Arena; Washington, D.C.
*Non-conference game. ^{#}Rankings from AP Poll. (#) Tournament seedings in parentheses.
