= Hank Evans =

American basketball player

Personal information
- Born: December 6, 1914 Stoneboro, Pennsylvania
- Died: 2000 (aged 85–86) Hermitage, Pennsylvania
- Listed height: 6 ft 3 in (1.91 m)
- Listed weight: 195 lb (88 kg)

Career information
- High school: Sharon (Sharon, Pennsylvania)
- Position: Center / forward

Career history
- 1939–1940: Westinghouse Air Brake Five
- 1944–1945: Pittsburgh Raiders

Henry G. Evans (December 6, 1914 – 2000) was an American professional basketball player. Evans played in the National Basketball League for the Pittsburgh Raiders in 1944–45 and averaged 8.5 points per game, which was a high average for basketball during that era.
