= Buddy Jeannette =

American basketball player & coach (1917–1998)

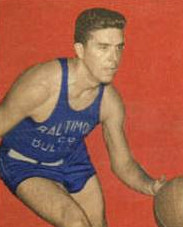
- Jeannette in 1948

Personal information
- Born: September 15, 1917 New Kensington, Pennsylvania, U.S.
- Died: March 11, 1998 (aged 80) Nashua, New Hampshire, U.S.
- Listed height: 5 ft 11 in (180 cm)
- Listed weight: 175 lb (79 kg)

Career information
- High school: New Kensington (New Kensington, Pennsylvania)
- College: Washington & Jefferson (1934–1938)
- Playing career: 1938–1950
- Position: Guard
- Number: 26, 6, 14
- Coaching career: 1946–1970

Career history

Playing
- 1938–1939: Warren Penns / Cleveland White Horses / Elmira Colonels
- 1939–1942: Detroit Eagles
- 1942: Saratoga Indians
- 1942–1943: Rochester Eber Seagrams
- 1943: Sheboygan Red Skins
- 1943–1946: Fort Wayne Zollner Pistons
- 1946–1950: Baltimore Bullets

Career highlights
- BAA champion (1948); All-BAA Second Team (1948); 3× NBL champion (1943–1945); 4× All-NBL First Team (1941, 1944–1946); All-NBL Second Team (1943); 4× WPBT champion (1941, 1944–1946); 2× WPBT MVP (1941, 1945); 3× All-WPBT First Team (1942, 1943, 1945); NYPBL champion (1939); All-Time Pro Stars Second Team (1945); NBL All-Time Team
- Stats at NBA.com
- Stats at Basketball Reference
- Basketball Hall of Fame
- Collegiate Basketball Hall of Fame

Harry Edward "Buddy" Jeannette (September 15, 1917 – March 11, 1998) was an American professional basketball player and coach.

== Biography ==
Jeannette was widely regarded as the premier backcourt player between 1938 and 1948. He was named to the First Team of the National Basketball League (NBL) four times, and won titles with the NBL's Sheboygan Red Skins in 1943 and Fort Wayne Pistons in 1944 and 1945. Jeannette also won a title with the American Basketball League's Baltimore Bullets in 1948.

Most of his playing career came prior to the formation of the modern National Basketball Association (NBA) in its predecessor leagues the National Basketball League (NBL) and Basketball Association of America (BAA) including three years as a player-coach for the original Baltimore Bullets of the Basketball Association of America (BAA). In the 1948 BAA playoffs, he became the first player-coach to win a professional championship. After his playing career ended in 1950, he coached the original Bullets for one more season. He then became the head coach at Georgetown University for four seasons, leading the team to an appearance in the 1953 National Invitation Tournament. In 1957, he was named head basketball and baseball coach at the University of Baltimore. Jeannette served as head coach of the Baltimore Bullets in the Eastern Professional Basketball League (EPBL) from 1958 to 1961.

Jeannette returned to the ranks of professional coaching in the NBA to lead the modern Baltimore Bullets twice, once for a full season and once as an interim coach. He later would coach the American Basketball Association's Pittsburgh Pipers for part of a season.

In 1994, Jeannette was enshrined in the Naismith Memorial Basketball Hall of Fame. Jeannette attended Washington and Jefferson College, in Washington, Pennsylvania.

== Career playing statistics ==
=== NBL ===
Legend
GP	Games played	FGM	Field goals made
FTM	Free throws made	FTA	Free throws attempted
FT%	Free throw percentage	PTS	Total points
PPG	Points per game	**Bold**	Career high

†	Denotes seasons in which Jeannette's team won an NBL championship

=== NBL ===
==== Regular season ====
Year	Team	GP	FGM	FTM	FTA	FT%	PTS	PPG
1938–39	Warren/Cleveland	26	54	65			173	6.7
1939–40	Detroit	26	46	54			146	5.6
1940–41	Detroit	23	75	54	86	.628	204	8.9
1942–43†	Sheboygan	4	24	14	17	**.824**	62	**15.5**
1943–44†	Fort Wayne	22	68	48	65	.738	184	8.4
1944–45†	Fort Wayne	27	85	82	111	.739	252	9.3
1945–46	Fort Wayne	**34**	**99**	**105**	**136**	.772	**303**	8.9
Career		162	445	422	415	.730	1,324	8.2

==== Playoffs ====
Year	Team	GP	FGM	FTM	FTA	FT%	PTS	PPG
1940	Detroit	3	6	8			20	6.7
1941	Detroit	3	8	5			21	7.0
1943†	Sheboygan	5	16	17			49	**9.8**
1944†	Fort Wayne	5	12	10			34	6.8
1945†	Fort Wayne	**7**	**22**	**23**			**67**	9.6
1946	Fort Wayne	4	7	5	6	.833	19	4.8
Career		27	71	68	6	.833	210	7.8

=== BAA/NBA ===
Legend
GP	Games played	GS	Games started	MPG	Minutes per game
FG%	Field goal percentage	3P%	3-point field goal percentage	FT%	Free throw percentage
RPG	Rebounds per game	APG	Assists per game	SPG	Steals per game
BPG	Blocks per game	PPG	Points per game	**Bold**	Career high
†	Won an NBA championship	*	Led the league

==== Regular season ====
Year	Team	GP	FG%	FT%	APG	PPG
1947–48†	Baltimore	46	.349*	.758	1.5	**10.7**
1948–49	Baltimore	**56**	**.367**	.784	2.2	5.6
1949–50	Baltimore	37	.284	**.820**	**2.5**	5.2
Career		139	.341	.781	2.1	7.2

==== Playoffs ====
Year	Team	GP	FG%	FT%	APG	PPG
1948†	Baltimore	**11**	**.492**	.881	1.1	**8.8**
1949	Baltimore	3	.154	**1.000**	**1.7**	2.7
Career		14	.432	.891	1.2	7.5

== Head coaching record ==
=== BAA/NBA/ABA ===
Legend
Regular season	G	Games coached	W	Games won	L	Games lost	W–L %	Win–loss %
Playoffs	PG	Playoff games	PW	Playoff wins	PL	Playoff losses	PW–L %	Playoff win–loss %

Team	Year	G	W	L	W–L%	Finish	PG	PW	PL	PW–L%	Result
Baltimore	1947–48	28	20	48	.583	2nd in Western	11	8	3	.727	Won BAA Championship
Baltimore	1948–49	60	29	31	.483	3nd in Eastern	3	1	2	.333	Lost in Division Semifinals
Baltimore	1949–50	68	25	43	.368	5th in Eastern	–	–	–	–	Missed playoffs
Baltimore	1950–51	37	14	23	.378	–	–	–	–	–	Fired
Baltimore	1964–65	80	37	43	.463	3rd in Western	10	5	5	.500	Lost Division Finals
Baltimore (Note: Jeannette was one of three head coaches for Baltimore during the season. Mike Farmer had coached Baltimore to a 1–8 record in its first nine games when Jeannette took over. Jeannette served as interim head coach for the next 16 games. Gene Shue then took over as head coach, posting a 16–40 record to lead Baltimore to a 20–61 finish.)	1966–67	16	3	13	.188	–	–	–	–	–	Interim
Pittsburgh (Note: Jeannette was Pittsburgh's second head coach of the season, taking over the team from John Clark after it had gone 14–25 in its first 39 games. Jeannette coached Pittsburgh's remaining 45 games, leading the team to a 29–55 finish.)	1969–70	45	15	30	.333	–	–	–	–	–	Missed playoffs
Career (BAA/NBA)		309	136	173	.440		24	14	10	.583	
Career (overall)		573	326	247	.569		24	14	10	.583	

=== College ===
Record table
Season	Team	Overall	Conference	Standing	Postseason
Georgetown Hoyas (college independent) (1952–1956)
1952–53	Georgetown	13–7	–	–	NIT First Round
1953–54	Georgetown	11–18	–	–	none
1954–55	Georgetown	12–13	–	–	none
1955–56	Georgetown	13–11	–	–	none
Total:		49–49			
National champion Postseason invitational champion Conference regular season champion Conference regular season and conference tournament champion Division regular season champion Division regular season and conference tournament champion Conference tournament champion
