= Dale Hamilton =

American basketball player

Dale B. Hamilton (August 16, 1919 – August 12, 1994) was an American professional basketball guard–forward who spent eight seasons in the National Basketball League (NBL) and one season in the National Basketball Association (NBA). In the NBL, Hamilton played for the Hammond Ciesar All-Americans (1939–40), the Fort Wayne Zollner Pistons (1940–45), the Toledo Jeeps (1946–48) and the Waterloo Hawks (1949–50). He played for the Waterloo Hawks once they joined the NBA during the 1949–50 season. He attended Franklin College.

== Career statistics ==
Legend
GP	Games played	GS	Games started	MPG	Minutes per game
FG%	Field goal percentage	3P%	3-point field goal percentage	FT%	Free throw percentage
RPG	Rebounds per game	APG	Assists per game	SPG	Steals per game
BPG	Blocks per game	PPG	Points per game	**Bold**	Career high

=== NBA ===
==== Regular season ====
Year	Team	GP	FG%	FT%	APG	PPG
1949–50	Waterloo	14	.242	.474	1.2	1.8
