= Matt Vaniel =

American basketball player

Personal information
- Born: November 14, 1919 Braddock, Pennsylvania, U.S.
- Died: January 1, 1981 (aged 61) East Pittsburgh, Pennsylvania, U.S.
- Listed height: 6 ft 3 in (1.91 m)
- Listed weight: 170 lb (77 kg)

Career information
- High school: Scott (North Braddock, Pennsylvania)
- Position: Forward

Career history
- 1944–1945: Pittsburgh Raiders

Matthew Henry Vaniel (November 14, 1919 – January 1, 1981) was an American professional basketball player. He played in the National Basketball League for the Pittsburgh Raiders during the 1944–45 season. He averaged 7.5 points per game in 24 games. He was elected to the Pennsylvania Sports Hall of Fame shortly before his death.
