= Paul Kessy =

American basketball player

Personal information
- Born: May 17, 1915 Wisconsin, U.S.
- Died: January 3, 1971 (aged 55) Wisconsin, U.S.
- Listed height: 6 ft 3 in (1.91 m)
- Listed weight: 170 lb (77 kg)

Career information
- High school: Washington (Milwaukee, Wisconsin)
- College: Milwaukee (1936–1938)
- Position: Forward / center

Career history
- 1945: Cleveland Allmen Transfers
- 1945: Pittsburgh Raiders

Paul Kescenovitz "Kessy" Jr. (May 17, 1915 – January 3, 1971) was an American professional basketball player. Kessy played in the National Basketball League for the Cleveland Allmen Transfers and the Pittsburgh Raiders at the end of the 1944–45 season. He appeared in four games for Cleveland and one game for Pittsburgh.
