= George Haines (basketball) =

American basketball player (1921–2018)

Personal information
- Born: August 2, 1921 Tonawanda, New York
- Died: January 14, 2018 (aged 96) Bethlehem, Pennsylvania

Career information
- College: Bucknell (1940–1943)

Career history
- 1944–1945: Pittsburgh Raiders
- 1946–1947: Altoona Railroaders

George Freeman Haines, Jr. (August 2, 1921 – January 14, 2018) was a professional basketball player who spent one season as a member of the Pittsburgh Raiders in the National Basketball League (NBL) during the 1944–45 season. He attended Bucknell University, where he was named the Associated Press All-Pennsylvania Team during the 1942 season. He graduated during the summer of 1943 with a degree of chemical engineering. Academically he made the Dean's list and was the president of the senior class at Bucknell.
