= Joe Urso (basketball) =

American basketball player and coach

Personal information
- Born: September 17, 1916 Pennsylvania, U.S.
- Died: April 27, 1991 (aged 74) Hamilton, Ohio, U.S.
- Listed height: 5 ft 10 in (1.78 m)
- Listed weight: 170 lb (77 kg)

Career information
- College: Duquesne (1938–1939)
- Position: Guard

Career history

Playing
- 1944–1945: Pittsburgh Raiders
- 1945–1946: Youngstown Bears

Coaching
- 1944–1945: Pittsburgh Raiders

Joseph John Urso (September 17, 1916 – April 27, 1991) was an American professional basketball player and head coach. He played in the National Basketball League for the Pittsburgh Raiders during the 1944–45 season as well as for the Youngstown Bears during the 1945–46 season. Urso served as a player-coach for the Raiders (the only year the team existed). In college, he lettered in both basketball and golf at Duquesne University.
