= Bobby Holm =

American basketball player

Personal information
- Born: January 22, 1919 Brooklyn, New York, U.S.
- Died: April 14, 2002 (aged 83) Sheboygan, Wisconsin, U.S.
- Listed height: 6 ft 0 in (1.83 m)
- Listed weight: 200 lb (91 kg)

Career information
- High school: Erasmus (Brooklyn, New York)
- College: Seton Hall (1939–1940)
- Position: Guard

Career history
- 1942–1944: New York Jewels
- 1944–1947: Sheboygan Red Skins
- 1947–1948: Birmingham Skyhawks
- 1948: Saratoga Indians
- 1948–1949: Hammond Calumet Buccaneers
- 1949: Saratoga Indians
- 1950–1951: New Holstein

Robert Charles Holm (January 22, 1919 – April 14, 2002) was an American professional basketball player. He played in the National Basketball League for the Sheboygan Red Skins and Hammond Calumet Buccaneers and averaged 5.2 points per game. He also played in the American Basketball League, the New York State Professional Basketball League, and the Professional Basketball League of America.

Bobby Holm is the nephew of Olympic gold medalist swimmer Eleanor Holm.
