= 1945 World Professional Basketball Tournament =

World Professional Basketball Tournament
- 1945

Tournament information
- Location: Chicago, Illinois
- Dates: 19 March–24 March
- Teams: 14

Final positions
- Champions: Fort Wayne Zollner Pistons
- 1st runner-up: Dayton Acmes
- 2nd runner-up: Chicago American Gears
- MVP: Buddy Jeannette

The 1945 World Professional Basketball Tournament was the seventh edition of the World Professional Basketball Tournament. It was held in Chicago, Illinois, during the days of 19–24 March 1945 and featured 14 teams, with the teams being a mixture of independently run teams and teams from the National Basketball League, with this year's tournament primarily holding independent teams. Entering this year's tournament, the Fort Wayne Zollner Pistons were seen as the heavy favorites of the tournament by looking to repeat as champions of both the NBL and the WPBT, with fans also looking to cheer on the Chicago American Gears as a local team in the event as well. However, while the American Gears were able to upset the Harlem Globetrotters 53–49, Chicago itself was upset by the independently run Dayton Acmes (which was composed of servicemen players stationed at Wright Field) with an 80–51 blowout win by Dayton. Despite the upsets, however, the Fort Wayne Zollner Pistons would end up being repeat champions for both the WPBT and the NBL (being one of only three professional teams to win multiple championships during the same season throughout the 1940s and the only team to become repeat champions in both the NBL and WPBT) by beating the Dayton Acmes 78–52 in the championship game. The Chicago American Gears came in third after beating the New York Renaissance 64–55 in the third-place game. Buddy Jeannette of the Fort Wayne Zollner Pistons was named the tournament's Most Valuable Player, being the first player in the tournament's history to have multiple MVP honors in the tournament after previously being named the MVP of the 1941 tournament while with the Detroit Eagles and the third straight player from the Zollner Pistons to be named the MVP of the WPBT.

== Results ==
=== Bracket ===
Round 1
Oshkosh All-Stars	60
Detroit Mansfields	56
New York Renaissance	67
Indianapolis Oilers	59
Pittsburgh Raiders	53
Newark C-O Twos	50
Chicago American Gears	58
Hartford Nutmegs	47
Dayton Acmes	43
Long Island Grumman Hellcats	27
Midland Dow Chemicals	61
Cleveland Allmen Transfers	46

Quarterfinals
Fort Wayne Zollner Pistons	63
Oshkosh All-Stars	52
New York Renaissance	61
Pittsburgh Raiders	52
Chicago American Gears	53
Harlem Globetrotters	49
Dayton Acmes	52
Midland Dow Chemicals	50

Semifinals
Fort Wayne Zollner Pistons	68
New York Renaissance	45
Dayton Acmes	80
Chicago American Gears	51

Final
Fort Wayne Zollner Pistons	78
Dayton Acmes	52
Third place
Chicago American Gears	64
New York Renaissance	55

=== Third place game ===
24 March 1945

Box score

Chicago American Gears 64, New York Renaissance 55
Scoring by quarter: 14–21, 16–12, 16–11, 18–11
Pts: P. Brookfield – 15	Pts: P. Bell, Z. Clayton – 17

Chicago Stadium
Referees: Dutch Kriznecky, Steve Barak

=== Championship game ===
24 March 1945

Box score

Fort Wayne Zollner Pistons 78, Dayton Acmes 52
Scoring by half: 40–26, 38–26
Pts: B. Jeannette – 18	Pts: J. Mahnken – 16

Chicago Stadium
Attendance: 15,119
Referees: Nat Messenger, Art Mansfield

== Individual awards ==
- Bruce Hale of the independently ran Dayton Acmes led this tournament in scoring with 77 points scored in four games played.

=== All-Tournament First Team ===
- F - Bruce Hale, Dayton Acmes
- F - Buddy Jeannette, Fort Wayne Zollner Pistons (MVP)
- C - John Mahnken, Dayton Acmes
- G - Bobby McDermott, Fort Wayne Zollner Pistons
- G - Dick Triptow, Chicago American Gears

=== All-Tournament Second Team ===
- F - Chick Reiser, Fort Wayne Zollner Pistons
- F - Ray Patterson, Midland Dow Chemicals
- C - Jake Pelkington, Midland Dow Chemicals
- G - Jerry Bush, Fort Wayne Zollner Pistons
- G - Mel Riebe, Cleveland Allmen Transfers
- G - Puggy Bell, New York Renaissance

== See also ==
- 1944–45 National Basketball League (United States) season, a professional basketball season featuring five out of six teams there, including the two-time NBL (and eventual WPBT) champions in the Fort Wayne Zollner Pistons
