= Joseph J. Carlin =

American athlete and coach (1905–1957)

Biographical details
- Born: June 5, 1905
- Died: April 14, 1957 (aged 51)

Playing career

Football
- 1921–1924: Washington & Jefferson

Coaching career (HC unless noted)

Football
- 1930–1945: Case Tech (assistant)
- 1945: Case Tech

Basketball
- 1930–1946: Case Tech
- 1944–1946: Cleveland Allmen Transfers

Head coaching record
- Overall: 83–126 (college basketball); 17–48 (professional basketball); 0–4 (college football)

Joseph Jefferson "Jeff" Carlin (June 5, 1905 – April 14, 1957) was an American football, basketball, and baseball player and coach.

Carlin attended high school at Lawrence High School in Cedarhurst, New York, where he was a star baseball, basketball, and football athlete. Collegiately, he played baseball, basketball, and football at Washington & Jefferson College, playing in the 1922 Rose Bowl. He declined an offer from the New York Giants professional baseball team to coach college basketball.

Carlin was a long time basketball coach at Case Tech in Cleveland, Ohio from 1930 to 1946. He was also a head college coach football for four games in 1945.

From 1944 to 1946, he was the head basketball coach of the NBL's Cleveland Allmen Transfers and star player Mel Riebe.

== Head coaching record ==
=== Football ===
Year	Team	Overall	Conference	Standing	Bowl/playoffs
Case Tech Rough Riders (Ohio Athletic Conference) (1945)
1945	Case Tech	0–4			
Case Tech:		0–4			
Total:		0–4			
