= Frank Vukosic =

American basketball player

Personal information
- Born: April 8, 1915 Pittsburgh, Pennsylvania, U.S.
- Died: May 17, 1989 (aged 74) Huntington Beach, California, U.S.

Career history
- 1944: Pittsburgh Raiders

Frank Raymond Vukosic (April 8, 1915 – May 17, 1989) was an American professional basketball player. Vukosic played in the National Basketball League for the Pittsburgh Raiders in four games at the start of the 1944–45 season.
