= 1942–43 Oshkosh All-Stars season =

NBL professional basketball team season

- Head coach: Lon Darling
- General manager: Lon Darling
- Owner: Lon Darling
- Arena: South Park School Gymnasium

Results
- Record: 11–12 (.478)
- Place: Division: 3rd
- Playoff finish: Lost NBL Semifinals to Sheboygan Red Skins, 2–0; Lost WPBT Championship match 43–31 to the Washington Lichtman Bears

The 1942–43 Oshkosh All-Stars season was the All-Stars' sixth year in the United States' National Basketball League (NBL), which was also the sixth year the league existed. However, if one were to include the independent seasons they played starting all the way back in 1929 before beginning their NBL tenure in 1937, this would officially be their thirteenth season of play. Five teams started out the 1942–43 NBL season due to the rising tides of World War II's impact before the Toledo Jim White Chevrolets dropped out after playing four games in their season (all of them being on the road against each of the other four NBL teams, including the Oshkosh All-Stars), leaving only a lowly four teams left for the rest of the NBL's season and they did not use divisions for their third straight season in a row. (An exhibition game Oshkosh had against the Clintonville Truckers on November 7, 1942, had the Clintonville squad in Clintonville, Wisconsin wanting to join the NBL themselves similar to what the new Chicago Studebaker Flyers team had done this season, but due in part to their location (with them being 40 miles away from both Oshkosh and Green Bay, Wisconsin for the nearby Green Bay Packers NFL team), the notion of that team entering the NBL was almost seen as laughable by comparison.) The All-Stars played their home games at the South Park School Gymnasium in the South Park Middle School within the Oshkosh Area School District.

Due to the ever-growing presence of World War II, the Oshkosh All-Stars would see themselves enter some serious strife throughout the season, which would first be foreshadowed by them starting their season with a 3–3 record following two straight losses to the inner state rivals in the Sheboygan Red Skins. While Oshkosh would follow that period up with six straight wins in a row to get a 9–3 record (to the point of being named first place in the entire NBL at one point), the complete roster instability they had in relation to World War II's presence alongside serious injury issues like an infected leg for Gene Englund and a punctured eardrum for Lou Barle (Oshkosh would only have three total players (Leroy Edwards, Charley Shipp, and Ralph Vaughn) competing in at least 18 regular season games when every other surviving team had at least five players that played at least 18 games themselves, with eleven players playing at least five games and six others playing only one game total) would see Oshkosh faltering up on their positioning by the second half of the season. Not only that, but after getting nine wins at what would be considered the halfway point of their season, the All-Stars would only get two more wins for the rest of the regular season (with one being on January 16 against Sheboygan and the other being on February 6 against the Chicago Studebaker Flyers), which not only led to Oshkosh finishing their season without a first place divisional finish for the first time in NBL history, but also with a losing record as well (albeit barely), though they would still qualify for the NBL Playoffs this season due in part to the limited, competitive formatting of the NBL season on display. For the first round, the All-Stars would compete against the Sheboygan Red Skins once again, this time without having home court advantage to help themselves out, though the lack of home court advantage wouldn't matter this time since Sheboygan would end up sweeping Oshkosh 2–0, with the Red Skins later winning their first and only NBL championship in an upset series victory over the Fort Wayne Zollner Pistons 2–1. Following the season's conclusion, both Charley Shipp and Ralph Vaughn were named members of the All-NBL First Team, while Leroy Edwards was named a member of the All-NBL Second Team (which was the first time his honor was given a downgrade in performance).

The Oshkosh All-Stars would also later compete in the 1943 World Professional Basketball Tournament, as they sought to shake off the bad second half of the NBL season away from them in this tournament after they already had some previous successes in a different (mid-season) tournament held in Memphis, Tennessee involving two other NBL teams alongside the Toledo White Huts. After being given a first round bye in the WPBT this time around due to their prior success in the previous year's event, Oshkosh would mercilessly beat down the Detroit Eagles for the last time in that franchise's history in the quarterfinal round before upsetting the Fort Wayne Zollner Pistons in the semifinal round, though they would not find a way to defeat the all-black Washington Lichtman Bears (who had been suggested to be the all-black New York Renaissance competing under a different name that were also seen as either completely undefeated or had only one loss to their names by that point in time to their season after 50 or so games they played in by this point in time) in the championship round, thus failing to repeat as WPBT champions for this season while effectively providing the last independently ran team the championship for that tournament in its history. In terms of the Oshkosh franchise making a profit this season while in the NBL, however, the All-Stars (alongside the newly crowned NBL champions from Wisconsin in the Sheboygan Red Skins) would operate in a manner similar to that of the nearby Green Bay Packers NFL team with community members owning a share of the team. While they operated in a manner similar to that of the Sheboygan Red Skins, the Oshkosh All-Stars were seen as the more popular franchise between the two teams both at home and on the road (despite playing at a smaller venue in a middle school setting), meaning those factors combined with them winning their mid-season tournament over Sheboygan in Memphis earlier in the season (with Oshkosh receiving $1,000 in payment for their victory over Sheboygan, while the Red Skins received $500 as payment for their defeat, as well as Oshkosh receiving an extra $1,000 in their second-place finish at the 1943 WPBT) would have given them a higher profit margin in the process than the Red Skins squad had received throughout the season.

== Roster ==
1942–43 Oshkosh All-Stars roster
Players

Pos.	No.	Player	Height	Weight	DOB	From
F/C		O'Neal Adams	6 ft 3 in (1.91 m)	195 lb (88 kg)	1919–01–21	Arkansas
G		Bob Alwin	5 ft 10 in (1.78 m)	145 lb (66 kg)	1920–08–12	Wisconsin
F		Lou Barle	6 ft 1 in (1.85 m)	200 lb (91 kg)	1916–06–23	Minnesota Duluth
F/C		Connie Mack Berry	6 ft 3 in (1.91 m)	215 lb (98 kg)	1915–04–19	NC State
C		Leroy Edwards	6 ft 5 in (1.96 m)	210 lb (95 kg)	1914–04–11	Kentucky
G		Bud Engdahl	6 ft 1 in (1.85 m)	210 lb (95 kg)	1918–07–01	UW–Superior
F/C		Gene Englund	6 ft 5 in (1.96 m)	205 lb (93 kg)	1917–10–21	Wisconsin
G/F		Bill Komenich	6 ft 3 in (1.91 m)	210 lb (95 kg)	1916–07–01	Marquette
G/F		Bob Kramer	6 ft 3 in (1.91 m)	185 lb (84 kg)	1922–04–23	Hammond Tech HS (IN)
G		Ray Krzoska	6 ft 2 in (1.88 m)	190 lb (86 kg)	1918–10–28	Milwaukee
F		Gene Lorendo	6 ft 3 in (1.91 m)	215 lb (98 kg)	1921–12–07	Northern Iowa
G		Tex Mueller	6 ft 1 in (1.85 m)	175 lb (79 kg)	1916–07–29	Western Colorado
F/C		Fred Nimz	6 ft 3 in (1.91 m)	200 lb (91 kg)	1914–04–22	UW–Stevens Point
G		Tommy Nisbet	5 ft 10 in (1.78 m)	165 lb (75 kg)	1916–03–31	Illinois
G		Dave Quabius	5 ft 11 in (1.80 m)	185 lb (84 kg)	1916–03–16	Marquette
G/F		Charley Shipp	6 ft 1 in (1.85 m)	200 lb (91 kg)	1913–12–03	Catholic
G/F		Don Smith	6 ft 2 in (1.88 m)	190 lb (86 kg)	1920–07–27	Minnesota
F/C		John Townsend	6 ft 4 in (1.93 m)	208 lb (94 kg)	1916–09–20	Michigan
G/F		Ralph Vaughn	6 ft 1 in (1.85 m)	175 lb (79 kg)	1918–02–12	USC
G/F		Jewell Young	6 ft 0 in (1.83 m)	160 lb (73 kg)	1913–01–18	Purdue

Coaches
Head coach
- Lon Darling

Legend
- (DP) Unsigned draft pick
- (FA) Free agent
- (S) Suspended
- Injured

Roster

Note: Over half of the team's roster would not play in the NBL Playoffs this season, with all of O'Neal Adams, Bob Alwin, Lou Barle, Bud Engdahl, Bill Komenich, Bob Kramer, Ray Krzoska, Gene Lorendo, Tex Mueller, Fred Nimz, John Townsend, and Jewell Young not being a part of this team's playoff roster for one reason or another (usually related to World War II or injury purposes).

== Regular season ==
=== Season standings ===
Pos.	League Standings	Wins	Losses	Win %
1	Fort Wayne Zollner Pistons	17	6	.739
2	Sheboygan Red Skins	12	11	.522
3	Oshkosh All-Stars	11	12	.478
4	Chicago Studebaker Flyers	8	15	.348
5	Toledo Jim White Chevrolets^{†}	0	4	.000
^{†}Toledo disbanded during the season

=== NBL Schedule ===
Not to be confused with exhibition or other non-NBL scheduled games that did not count towards Oshkosh's official NBL record for this season. An official database created by John Grasso detailing every NBL match possible (outside of two matches that the Kankakee Gallagher Trojans won over the Dayton Metropolitans in 1938) would be released in 2026 showcasing every team's official schedules throughout their time spent in the NBL. As such, these are the official results recorded for the Oshkosh All-Stars during their sixth season in the NBL.

#	Date	Opponent	Score	Record
1	November 28	Chicago	41–40	1–0
2	December 5	Fort Wayne	47–38	2–0
3	December 6	Chicago	35–46	2–1
4	December 12	Toledo	46–41	3–1
5	December 17	@ Sheboygan	32–43	3–2
6	December 19	Sheboygan	31–37	3–3
7	December 23	@ Fort Wayne	46–43	4–3
8	December 26	Chicago	44–33	5–3
9	January 1	@ Sheboygan	61–55 (OT)	6–3
10	January 2	Sheboygan	48–25	7–3
11	January 9	Fort Wayne	47–39	8–3
12	January 10	@ Chicago	51–41	9–3
13	January 12	@ Fort Wayne	34–43	9–4
14	January 14	@ Sheboygan	22–26	9–5
15	January 16	Sheboygan	49–46	10–5
16	January 23	Chicago	52–58 (2OT)	10–6
17	January 30	Fort Wayne	33–40	10–7
18	January 31	@ Chicago	60–73	10–8
19	February 2	Sheboygan	47–49	10–9
20	February 6	@ Chicago	63–55	11–9
21	February 9	@ Fort Wayne	44–47	11–10
22	February 13	Fort Wayne	47–50	11–11
23	February 14	@ Sheboygan	42–48	11–12

== NBL Playoffs ==
=== NBL Semifinals ===
(3) Oshkosh All-Stars vs. (2) Sheboygan Red Skins: Sheboygan wins series 2–0

- Game 1: February 20, 1943 @ Sheboygan: Sheboygan 50, Oshkosh 38
- Game 2: February 21, 1943 @ Oshkosh: Sheboygan 56, Oshkosh 47

=== Awards and honors ===
- First Team All-NBL – Charley Shipp and Ralph Vaughn
- Second Team All-NBL – Leroy Edwards
- NBL All-Time Team – Leroy Edwards, Gene Englund and Charley Shipp

== World Professional Basketball Tournament ==
For the fifth straight year in a row, the Oshkosh All-Stars would participate in the annual World Professional Basketball Tournament in Chicago, which the 1943 event was held on March 15–18, 1943 and was mostly held by independently ran teams alongside the four remaining NBL teams (albeit with one NBL team doing a last-minute rebranding for the WPBT this time around similar to the Toledo Jim White Chevrolets rebranding themselves to the Toledo White Huts) due in part to World War II. Because of the war also providing the lowest amount of competing teams available by this point in time with only 12 participating teams this time around, four teams (two from the NBL's side and two representing independently ran teams) would be given first round byes, with Oshkosh being given a first round bye alongside the Sheboygan Red Skins, the world-famous (all black) Harlem Globetrotters, and the all-black Washington Lichtman Bears due to the All-Stars being considered the defending WPBT champions (alongside them being two-time NBL champions as well). After skipping past the first round entirely, Oshkosh (with the help of new arrivals Tommy Nisbet and Bob Carpenter) would see them competing against the former NBL-turned independently ran Detroit Eagles franchise (who had recently signed three University of Notre Dame players in Charlie Butler, Bob Rensberger, and Ralph Vinciguerra (though only Butler played for them)) for the third straight year in a row (this time competing against them in an early round instead of in a championship round). After losing to Detroit in 1941 and then defeating the Eagles in 1942, the All-Stars would crush the Eagles through a balanced scoring team effort with a 65–36 blowout victory (with nearly all of Detroit's scoring coming from Butler, former Chicago Studebaker Flyers player Paul Sokody, and Chuck Chuckovits) to end the Detroit Eagles' existence as a franchise not long afterward. In the semifinal round, the All-Stars managed to upset the team with the best record in the NBL this season, the Fort Wayne Zollner Pistons, with Charley Shipp hitting a game-winning shot with 30 seconds left in the game to upset Fort Wayne with a close 40–39 victory that had both teams scoring in a balanced manner. For the championship round, Oshkosh would go up against the all-black Washington Lichtman Bears, who were not only considered to be the all-black New York Renaissance competing under a different team name this time around for whatever reason, but would also be competing in the championship round as either a team that either lost only one game by that point in time or were undefeated by this point in time after 50 games played, depending on the sources stated. Regardless of what the actual record was for the Washington franchise, the Bears would continue to showcase their physical fortitude as a dominant, independent franchise throughout this season by defeating Oshkosh's All-Stars with a 43–31 final score to give Washington's squad the final independent franchise to ever be named WPBT champions throughout the tournament's history (though weirdly enough, neither Washington nor Oshkosh would have a player be named the tournament's MVP this year, as Curly Armstrong of the Fort Wayne Zollner Pistons would receive that honor instead despite Fort Wayne getting a third-place finish in this tournament), as future champions going forward in its history would be dominated by NBL teams from here on out. Following the tournament's conclusion, Charley Shipp would be named a member of the All-Tournament First Team, while Ralph Vaughn was named a member of the All-Tournament Second Team. Not only that, but the Washington Lichtman Bears would receive a total of $1,500 as payment for winning this year's tournament (which they thought was an insulting figure for the team to earn as payment even back then, never mind over sixty years later, according to Washington player John Isaacs), while Oshkosh received a total of $1,000 as payment for their second-place finish.

=== Scores ===
- Oshkosh had a bye in the first round.
- Won quarterfinal round (65–36) over Detroit Eagles
- Won semifinal round (40–39) over Fort Wayne Zollner Pistons
- Lost championship round (31–43) to Washington Lichtman Bears

=== Awards and Records ===
- Charley Shipp, All-Tournament First Team
- Ralph Vaughn, All-Tournament Second Team
