= 1942–43 Toledo Jim White Chevrolets season =

Aborted NBL professional basketball team season

- Head coach: Sidney Goldberg
- Owner(s): Jim White (majority); Sidney Goldberg (minority)
- Arena: The Field House

Results
- Record: 0–4 (.000)
- Place: Division: N/A (5th)
- Playoff finish: Did not qualify (Folded operations early in the season.)

The 1942–43 Toledo Jim White Chevrolets season was the second and final season of the Toledo Jim White Chevrolets playing in the United States' National Basketball League (NBL), which would also be the sixth year the NBL itself existed. However, if you include their previous NBL season where they began playing as the Toledo Jim White Chevrolets and the season before that where they began to play as the Toledo White Huts, as noted by their appearance in the 1941 World Professional Basketball Tournament, then this short season would actually be their third and final season of play instead, with it technically being the only NBL team to hold an incomplete season during the league's history.

With the NBL being cut down to a significantly low five total teams following the dropouts of the Akron Goodyear Wingfoots, Indianapolis Kautskys, and Chicago Bruins despite getting a quick replacement team of sorts in the Chicago Studebaker Flyers, minority team owner Sidney Goldberg suggested for teams like his to start allowing for racial integration to occur for the NBL's teams since World War II was cutting into the talent level of every team at hand there. With that suggestion in mind and approved by the higher-ups in the NBL, the Toledo Jim White Chevrolets gave way for both Jim White's team and the Chicago Studebaker Flyers to allow for racially integrated teams to occur within the league as well. Unfortunately for Goldberg and the Jim White Chevrolets, the team was still struggling financially throughout the season and their first four games of the season were all on the road against the other four teams of the NBL that were competing alongside them this season. As such, when the four teams beat them in what ultimately turned out to be the final four games that the Jim White Chevrolets would ever play in the NBL, the Toledo franchise announced to the rest of the league on December 14, 1942, that they would fold operations from the NBL altogether (thus technically making this the worst season for a team in NBL history), with the NBL adjusting the rest of their season to accommodate the surprising short notice on their ends due to them previously scheduling Toledo to play road matches earlier on in the season. (Eddie Sadowski would also be the only Toledo player to transfer to a new NBL team this season, with him going to the eventual champion Sheboygan Red Skins after the Jim White Chevrolets folded operations in the NBL.) As a result of these circumstances, the Toledo Jim White Chevrolets would become the only team in the NBL's history to outright fold operations during a season of theirs (at least without utilizing a plan to replace the team during the season) throughout the league's 12-year history (or if you include the two years as the Midwest Basketball Conference precursor league, their 14-year history instead).

Despite their surprisingly early folding from the NBL, it would later be revealed in early February 1943 that the original team name that they had, the Toledo White Huts, would end up returning to action as one of four teams competing in a tournament held in Memphis, Tennessee that had a prize pool of $1,000 involved for the winning team alongside $750 for the second place team and $500 for the third place team, though they wouldn't win any of the prizes for that event in part due to the other competitors involved, which included the other NBL teams they competed against in the Fort Wayne Zollner Pistons (who won third place over Toledo), the second-place winners (and eventual NBL champions) in the Sheboygan Red Skins, and the champions of that event in the Oshkosh All-Stars.

== Roster ==
Player	Position
Shannie Barnett	F-C
Bob Gerber	C-F
Cortez Gray	F-C
Pat Hintz	G
Bill Jones	F
Casey Jones	G
Al Price	G
Eddie Sadowski	G
John Townsend	C-F
Zano Wast	F

== Statistics ==
Rk	Player	Pos	G	FG	FT	PTS	FGA	FTA	PPG
1	Pat Hintz	G	4	18	4	40	4.5	1.0	10.0
2	Bill Jones	F	4	11	0	22	2.8	0.0	5.5
3	Bob Gerber	C-F	1	9	4	22	9.0	4.0	22.0
4	Cortez Gray	F-C	4	7	4	18	1.8	1.0	4.5
5	John Townsend	C-F	2	6	4	16	3.0	2.0	8.0
6	Shannie Barnett	F-C	4	5	4	14	1.3	1.0	3.5
7	Al Price	G	3	3	2	8	1.0	0.7	2.7
8	Eddie Sadowski	G	2	4	0	8	2.0	0.0	4.0
9	Casey Jones	G	3	3	1	7	1.0	0.3	2.3
10	Zano Wast	F	1	0	0	0	0.0	0.0	0.0

== Regular season ==
=== Season standings ===
Pos.	League Standings	Wins	Losses	Win %
1	Fort Wayne Zollner Pistons	17	6	.739
2	Sheboygan Red Skins	12	11	.522
3	Oshkosh All-Stars	11	12	.478
4	Chicago Studebaker Flyers	8	15	.348
5	Toledo Jim White Chevrolets^{†}	0	4	.000
^{†}Toledo disbanded during the season

=== NBL Schedule ===
The Toledo Jim White Chevrolets would play only four total games this season before folding operations early on in the season, with all four of their games played being held on the road against each of the four remaining NBL teams that were playing for this season. The ordering of the schedule for the games that Toledo played for this season would go as thus for these following games:

- December 8, 1942 @ Fort Wayne, IN: Toledo Jim White Chevrolets 51, Fort Wayne Zollner Pistons 70
- December 11, 1942 @ Chicago, IL: Toledo Jim White Chevrolets 30, Chicago Studebaker Flyers 42
- December 12, 1942 @ Oshkosh, WI: Toledo Jim White Chevrolets 41, Oshkosh All-Stars 46
- December 13, 1942 @ Sheboygan, WI: Toledo Jim White Chevrolets 31, Sheboygan Red Skins 37
