= 1942–43 National Basketball League (United States) season =

1942–43 NBL season
- League: National Basketball League
- Sport: Basketball
- Duration: November 25, 1942 – February 18, 1943; February 20–23, 1943 (Playoffs); March 1–March 9, 1943 (Finals)
- Games: 23 (originally 24^{note})
- Teams: 5 (later 4^{note})

Regular season
- Season champions: Fort Wayne Zollner Pistons
- Top seed: Fort Wayne Zollner Pistons
- Season MVP: Bobby McDermott (Fort Wayne)
- Top scorer: Bobby McDermott (Fort Wayne)

Playoffs
- First semifinal champions: Fort Wayne Zollner Pistons
- First semifinal runners-up: Chicago Studebaker Flyers
- Second semifinal champions: Sheboygan Red Skins
- Second semifinal runners-up: Oshkosh All-Stars

Finals
- Venue: North Side High School Gym, Fort Wayne, Indiana; Sheboygan Armory, Sheboygan, Wisconsin
- Champions: Sheboygan Red Skins
- Runners-up: Fort Wayne Zollner Pistons

NBL seasons
- ← 1941–42 1943–44 →

The 1942–43 NBL season was the eighth National Basketball League (NBL) season. This was the third straight NBL regular season to be played without divisions due to a significant number of teams leaving the league this season in relation to World War II. The regular season began on November 25, 1942, and ran until February 18, 1943. The playoffs began on February 20, 1943, and concluded on March 9, 1943, with the Sheboygan Red Skins winning the NBL championship by two games to one over the Fort Wayne Zollner Pistons.

Due to the effects of World War II, the season began with only five teams, though one team (the Toledo Jim White Chevrolets) ultimately folded early on in this season after playing four straight road games against each of the remaining teams in the NBL during the month of December. Because this season had only four competitive teams for the majority of the season (with the Fort Wayne Zollner Pistons looking to help fund for the remaining three teams that needed any financial help during this season in case they needed it since they were the most financially stable franchise during this time), it would mark the first season in the league's history where every (remaining) team would qualify for playoff competition. The season was also highlighted by a continuation of racial integration in the NBL, with the Chicago Studebaker Flyers joining the briefly existing Chevrolets franchise in fielding black players.

== Teams ==
Three teams from the previous NBL season did not return. The Akron Goodyear Wingfoots works team and the Indianapolis Katuskys (for the second time) both departed the league due to them deciding not to field any teams for competition due to the growing presence of World War II. The Katuskys would return for the 1945–46 NBL season following the war's conclusion, but the Wingfoots would not return to the NBL, with them instead opting to return to play in the National Industrial Basketball League from its inception in 1947, with the Goodyear franchise still operating in the present day as an Amateur Athletic Union squad. The Chicago Bruins would officially fold operations this season themselves, though they were replaced by another Chicago team in the Chicago Studebaker Flyers. However, by the time the 1943 World Professional Basketball Tournament began, the Chicago Studebaker Flyers would end up rebranding themselves into the South Bend Studebaker Champions for that specific event instead. In a somewhat similar manner, the Toledo Jim White Chevrolets would also rebrand themselves into the Toledo White Huts for games outside of the NBL's scheduled games due to a unique stipulation involved with the original ownership's franchise rights at hand, which weirdly included a tournament that the Toledo franchise would compete in by February 1943 despite them already leaving the NBL early into the season.

National Basketball League
Chicago Studebaker Flyers/South Bend Studebaker Champions

Chicago, Illinois/South Bend, Indiana

Fort Wayne Zollner Pistons

Fort Wayne, Indiana

Oshkosh All-Stars

Oshkosh, Wisconsin

Sheboygan Red Skins

Sheboygan, Wisconsin

Toledo Jim White Chevrolets/Toledo White Huts

Toledo, Ohio

Coaching changes
Offseason
| Team | 1941–42 coach | 1942–43 coach |
|---|---|---|
| Sheboygan Red Skins | Frank Zummach | Erwin Graf (player-coach) |
| Toledo Jim White Chevrolets | Tommy Edwards (player-coach) | Sidney Goldberg |
In-season
| Team | Outgoing coach | Incoming coach |
| Sheboygan Red Skins | Erwin Graf (player-coach) | Carl Roth |

== Preseason ==
The NBL considered shutting down operations due to the growing presence of World War II, but its continued operation was encouraged by the federal government as a means of boosting morale at home. The league also reached agreements with the rivaling American Basketball League and the minor league Connecticut State Basketball League to prohibit transfers of players between the leagues without due compensation to minimize the effects of many players joining the war effort. (By the start of the following season, only the ABL would be left in terms of the agreement from this season entering that new season due to the Connecticut State Basketball League folding operations following the end of their regular season period.)

== Regular season ==
Four games into the season, the Toledo Jim White Chevrolets withdrew from the league after losing most of their key players to the armed forces. They would later end up playing as the Toledo White Huts in an in-season tournament unrelated to the NBL outside of most of the NBL's teams participating in the event in February. Toledo's withdrawal from the season early on left the league with only four teams competing for the rest of the season, which left the league adjusting every team's schedules up so that each remaining team would play a total of 23 games instead of the originally planned 24 games they had intended to play for the season.

The season marked continued racial integration among NBL teams. Both Toledo and the Chicago Studebaker Flyers fielding integrated teams. Chicago became the first NBL team to field a starting five of all black players during a game against the Oshkosh All-Stars. Although reception to integration was positive overall, with Toledo player Bill Jones saying that he was not subjected to racial abuse, players were still discriminated against and neither integrated team would participate in future NBL seasons.

The season was seriously disrupted by World War II. The Office of Defense Transportation banned pleasure driving in 1943 in order to minimize civilian gasoline consumption, which made travel for the All-Stars and the Sheboygan Red Skins challenging.

=== In-season tournament ===
During the early portion of February 1943, three of the four NBL's teams entered a midseason exhibition tournament, with the fourth team entering it being the Toledo White Huts, who surprisingly returned to compete for the event after previously removing themselves from NBL competition earlier in the season (as the Toledo Jim White Chevrolets); the four-team midseason exhibition tournament in Memphis, Tennessee rewarded a $1,000 grand prize for the winning team, $750 for the second place team, and $500 for the third place team. In the first round, Oshkosh beat Toledo 56–35 and Sheboygan beat Fort Wayne 52–44. In the final round, Oshkosh beat Sheboygan 40–36 to win the tournament and Fort Wayne beat Toledo 41–26 to claim third place.

=== Final standings ===
| Pos. | League Standings | Wins | Losses | Win % |
|---|---|---|---|---|
| 1 | Fort Wayne Zollner Pistons | 17 | 6 | .739 |
| 2 | Sheboygan Red Skins | 12 | 11 | .522 |
| 3 | Oshkosh All-Stars | 11 | 12 | .478 |
| 4 | Chicago Studebaker Flyers | 8 | 15 | .348 |
| 5 | Toledo Jim White Chevrolets^{†} | 0 | 4 | .000 |
^{†}Toledo disbanded during the season

== Postseason ==
=== Playoffs ===
All four of the remaining NBL teams played in a playoff to determine the season's champion. Both rounds were played in a best-of-three format. The Fort Wayne Zollner Pistons were the 1-seed, and advanced to the finals after winning a 2–1 series over the 4-seed Chicago Studebaker Flyers. The Pistons were joined in the finals by the 2-seed Sheboygan Red Skins after they swept the 3-seed Oshkosh All-Stars in the other semifinal.

==== Finals ====
Game 1 of the finals was played on March 1, 1943, at the North Side High School Gym in Fort Wayne. Sheboygan came back to beat Fort Wayne 55–50 after trailing 27–21 at the half, with Ed Dancker scoring 16 points for the Red Skins and Bobby McDermott scoring 20 points for the Pistons.

FW: WOWO SHB: WHBL

March 1, 1943
8:15 PM (CWT)

Sheboygan Red Skins 55, Fort Wayne Zollner Pistons 50
Scoring by quarter: 11–12, 10–15, 19–7, 15–16
| Pts: Ed Dancker, 16 | Pts: Bobby McDermott, 20 |
Game 1, Sheboygan leads 1–0

North Side High School Gym
Fort Wayne, Indiana
Referees: Nate Messenger, Jim Enright

The Pistons tied the series in Game 2 in Sheboygan, winning in overtime by a score of 50 to 45 after the game finished tied at 44 in regulation. McDermott, Curly Armstrong, and Gene Towery each scored 11 points for the Pistons, while the Red Skins were led by 13 points from Dancker.

FW: WOWO SHB: WHBL

March 2, 1943
8:30 PM (EWT)

Fort Wayne Zollner Pistons 50, Sheboygan Red Skins 45 (OT)
Scoring by quarter: 11–9, 20–17, 7–11, 6–7, Overtime: 6–1
| Pts: Curly Armstrong, 11; Bobby McDermott, 11; Gene Towery, 11 | Pts: Ed Dancker, 13 |
Game 2, series tied 1–1

Sheboygan Armory
Sheboygan, Wisconsin
Referees: Nate Messenger, Stoneman

The series returned to Fort Wayne for the third game, which was postponed to March 9, 1943, after a scheduling conflict. The game was a low-scoring affair (as noted by Sheboygan only making a single free-throw and Fort Wayne only getting a single basket (or two free-throws) in the entire third quarter), with Sheboygan scoring a near-buzzer beater to seal the title by a score of 30–29. Armstrong led the Pistons in scoring with 10 points, while Buddy Jeannette scored 7 points including the game winning shot to lead the Red Skins to the title. After previously naming their championship the "Shaughnessy Trophy" in honor of Frank Shaughnessy, the creator of the Shaughnessy playoff system that the NBL would use throughout the majority of its existence, this season would be the first season in the league's existence where the championship would be named the "James Naismith Trophy" in honor of Dr. James Naismith, the sport of basketball's creator that would live to see the NBL's creation instead.

FW: WOWO SHB: WHBL

March 9, 1943
7:45 PM (CWT)

Sheboygan Red Skins 30, Fort Wayne Zollner Pistons 29
Scoring by quarter: 9–7, 11–11, 1–2, 9–9
| Pts: Buddy Jeannette, 7 | Pts: Curly Armstrong, 10 |
Game 3, Sheboygan wins 2–1

North Side High School Gym
Fort Wayne, Indiana
Referees: Nate Messenger, Jim Enright

==== Bracket ====
Semifinals
1 | Fort Wayne Zollner Pistons | 2
4 | Chicago Studebaker Flyers | 1
2 | Sheboygan Red Skins | 2
3 | Oshkosh All-Stars | 0

NBL Championship
1 | Fort Wayne Zollner Pistons | 1
2 | Sheboygan Red Skins | 2

- Bold Series winner

=== World Professional Basketball Tournament ===
Following the conclusion of the NBL playoffs, all four of the remaining NBL teams participated in the 1943 edition of the World Professional Basketball Tournament. The Chicago Studebaker Flyers, after moving to South Bend, Indiana and rebranding themselves the South Bend Studebaker Champions, were defeated in the first round at the hands of the Minneapolis Sparklers, who were led by future Minneapolis Lakers head coach John Kundla. The Sheboygan Red Skins entered the tournament at the quarterfinal stage, but lost in that round to the Fort Wayne Zollner Pistons. The Zollner Pistons then lost to the Oshkosh All-Stars in the semifinals before claiming third place over the Dayton Dive Bombers. The All-Stars finished as tournament as the runners-up, losing 43–31 to the undefeated Washington Bears in the final match of the tournament.

March 17, 1943
9:30 PM (CWT)

Washington Bears 43, Oshkosh All-Stars 31
Scoring by quarter: 19–9, 8–6, 8–9, 8–7
| Pts: John Isaacs, 11 | Pts: Leroy Edwards, 7 |

International Amphitheatre
Chicago, Illinois
Attendance: 11,000
Referees: Pat Kennedy, Frank Kriznecky

== Statistics ==
=== Leaders ===
| Category | Player | Team | Stat |
|---|---|---|---|
| Points | Bobby McDermott | Fort Wayne Zollner Pistons | 316 |
| Free-Throws | Bernie Price | Chicago Studebaker Flyers | 77 |
| Field goals | Bobby McDermott | Fort Wayne Zollner Pistons | 132 |

Note: Prior to the 1969–70 NBA season, league leaders in points were determined by totals rather than averages. Also, rebounding and assist numbers were not recorded properly in the NBL like they would be in the BAA/NBA, as would field goal and free-throw shooting percentages.

== Awards ==
Sonny Boswell became the first and only African American named to an all-NBL team.

- NBL Most Valuable Player: Bobby McDermott, Fort Wayne Zollner Pistons
- NBL Coach of the Year: Carl Roth, Sheboygan Red Skins
- NBL Rookie of the Year: Ken Buehler, Sheboygan Red Skins
- All-NBL First Team:
  - F/G – Ralph Vaughn, Oshkosh All-Stars
  - F/G – Charley Shipp, Oshkosh All-Stars
  - C – Ed Dancker, Sheboygan Red Skins
  - G/F – Curly Armstrong, Fort Wayne Zollner Pistons
  - G – Bobby McDermott, Fort Wayne Zollner Pistons
- All-NBL Second Team:
  - F/G – Ken Suesens, Sheboygan Red Skins
  - F/C – Jerry Bush, Fort Wayne Zollner Pistons
  - C/F – Leroy Edwards, Oshkosh All-Stars
  - G – Sonny Boswell, Chicago Studebaker Flyers
  - G – Buddy Jeannette, Sheboygan Red Skins

== See also ==
- National Basketball League (United States)
