= 1942–43 Sheboygan Red Skins season =

NBL professional basketball team season

- NBL champions
- Head coach: Erwin Graf (player-coach; 5–5); Carl Roth (7–6)
- General manager: Carl Roth
- Arena: Sheboygan Municipal Auditorium and Armory

Results
- Record: 12–11 (.522)
- Place: Division: 2nd
- Playoff finish: NBL champions (Won 2–1 over Fort Wayne Zollner Pistons)
- Radio: WHBL

The 1942–43 Sheboygan Red Skins season was the Red Skins' fifth year in the United States' National Basketball League (NBL), which would also be the sixth year the NBL itself existed. However, if one were to include their few seasons they played as an independent team under a few various team names involving local businesses like The Ballhorns (being sponsored by a local florist and funeral parlor), the Art Imigs (being sponsored by a local dry cleaning shop owned and operated by a man named Art Imig with team jerseys saying Art Imig's), and the Enzo Jels (being sponsored by a local gelatin manufacturer known as Enzo-Pac) at various points before becoming the Sheboygan Red Skins due to their promotion up into the NBL, this would officially be their tenth overall season of play as well. Five teams originally competed in the NBL for the 1942–43 season, which was the league's lowest number of teams available to that point (largely caused by World War II) before the Toledo Jim White Chevrolets folded operations four games into the season in order to have only four competing teams left there (the Sheboygan Red Skins, the Fort Wayne Zollner Pistons, the two-time defending champion Oshkosh All-Stars, and the newly-implemented Chicago Studebaker Flyers as a replacement for the Chicago Bruins) for the rest of the season, leaving the NBL without divisions for a third straight season in a row.

The Red Skins played their home games at the Sheboygan Municipal Auditorium and Armory. For the second time in franchise history (1941), the Red Skins advanced to the NBL Championship, with Sheboygan sweeping the Oshkosh All-Stars 2-0. They then went on to win their first and only NBL championship by defeating the Fort Wayne Zollner Pistons, two games to one in a best-of-three series. In the third and deciding game, Ed Dancker made the game-winning shot from the corner with less than five seconds remaining to win the championship.

Head coach Carl Roth won the league's Coach of the Year Award despite Sheboygan barely having an above-average team record that year and being second place in the regular season behind the Fort Wayne Zollner Pistons (as well as Roth only coaching for 13 regular season games), while player Ken Buehler was named NBL Rookie of the Year. Ed Dancker (First Team), Buddy Jeannette (Second), and Ken Suesens (Second) earned All-NBL honors. In terms of profits during the season, however, the Red Skins franchise (alongside the rivaling Oshkosh All-Stars) operated in a manner similar to that of the nearby Green Bay Packers NFL team with community members owning a share of the team. For Sheboygan's case, despite them making worthwhile profits with their new arena they had built at the time to seat a few thousand people, the actual usage of it was either free or very minimal for the team, meaning their expenses related to traveling, equipment, and player-staff salaries, to the point where some players were paid only $50 per game (with Buddy Jeannette getting $500 per game for his late inclusion for being signed away from the independently ran Rochester Eber Seagrams (now the NBA's Sacramento Kings) franchise).

== Roster ==
1942–43 Sheboygan Red Skins roster
Players

Pos.	No.	Player	Height	Weight	DOB	From
F/C		Ken Buehler	6 ft 2 in (1.88 m)	185 lb (84 kg)	1919–11–19	Milwaukee
C		Ed Dancker	6 ft 7 in (2.01 m)	200 lb (91 kg)	1914–03–14	South Division HS (WI)
F/C		Erwin Graf	6 ft 3 in (1.91 m)	200 lb (91 kg)	1917–07–28	Marquette
C		George Jablonski	6 ft 7 in (2.01 m)	215 lb (98 kg)	1919–07–18	Milwaukee
G		Buddy Jeannette	5 ft 11 in (1.80 m)	175 lb (79 kg)	1917–09–15	Washington & Jefferson
F/C		Pete Lalich	6 ft 3 in (1.91 m)	190 lb (86 kg)	1920–06–23	Ohio
G/F		Rube Lautenschlager	6 ft 2 in (1.88 m)	190 lb (86 kg)	1915–09–07	UW–Oshkosh
G		Joel Mason	6 ft 0 in (1.83 m)	195 lb (88 kg)	1912–03–12	Western Michigan
G/F		Bill McDonald	6 ft 3 in (1.91 m)	190 lb (86 kg)	1916–11–05	Marquette
G/F		Bob Regh	6 ft 2 in (1.88 m)	190 lb (86 kg)	1912–10–11	Hammond Tech HS (IN)
G		Eddie Sadowski	5 ft 10 in (1.78 m)	175 lb (79 kg)	1915–02–02	Notre Dame
F/C		Warren Schrage	6 ft 5 in (1.96 m)	190 lb (86 kg)	1920–07–30	Wisconsin
G/F		Dick Schulz	6 ft 2 in (1.88 m)	192 lb (87 kg)	1917–01–03	Wisconsin
F		Bob Schwartz	6 ft 3 in (1.91 m)	175 lb (79 kg)	1919–01–14	Wisconsin
G		Ken Suesens	6 ft 1 in (1.85 m)	175 lb (79 kg)	1916–10–23	Iowa

Coaches
Head coach
- Erwin Graf
- Carl Roth

Legend
- (DP) Unsigned draft pick
- (FA) Free agent
- (S) Suspended
- Injured

Roster

Note: Ken Buehler, Erwin Graf, Pete Lalich, and Joel Mason were not on the playoff roster for this season.

== Regular season ==
=== Season standings ===
Pos.	League Standings	Wins	Losses	Win %
1	Fort Wayne Zollner Pistons	17	6	.739
2	Sheboygan Red Skins	12	11	.522
3	Oshkosh All-Stars	11	12	.478
4	Chicago Studebaker Flyers	8	15	.348
5	Toledo Jim White Chevrolets^{†}	0	4	.000
^{†}Toledo disbanded during the season

=== NBL Schedule ===
Not to be confused with exhibition or other non-NBL scheduled games that did not count towards Sheboygan's official NBL record for this season. An official database created by John Grasso detailing every NBL match possible (outside of two matches that the Kankakee Gallagher Trojans won over the Dayton Metropolitans in 1938) would be released in 2026 showcasing every team's official schedules throughout their time spent in the NBL. As such, these are the official results recorded for the Sheboygan Red Skins during their fifth season in the NBL.

#	Date	Opponent	Score	Record
1	November 25	Chicago	53–45	1–0
2	December 3	Fort Wayne	45–54	1–1
3	December 13	Toledo	38–33	2–1
4	December 17	Oshkosh	43–32	3–1
5	December 19	@ Oshkosh	37–31	4–1
6	December 20	@ Chicago	41–43	4–2
7	December 25	Chicago	55–46	5–2
8	December 29	@ Fort Wayne	45–58	5–3
9	January 1	Oshkosh	55–61 (OT)	5–4
10	January 2	@ Oshkosh	25–48	5–5
11	January 10	Fort Wayne	40–42	5–6
12	January 14	Oshkosh	26–22	6–6
13	January 16	@ Oshkosh	46–49	6–7
14	January 21	Chicago	42–40	7–7
15	January 24	@ Chicago	37–48	7–8
16	January 26	@ Fort Wayne	36–55	7–9
17	January 31	Fort Wayne	47–31	8–9
18	February 2	@ Oshkosh	49–47	9–9
19	February 7	@ Chicago	47–45	10–9
20	February 11	Chicago	44–42	11–9
21	February 14	Oshkosh	42–48	11–10
22	February 16	Fort Wayne	48–54	11–11
23	February 18	Fort Wayne	49–35	12–11

== NBL Playoffs ==
=== NBL Semifinals ===
(2) Sheboygan Red Skins vs. (3) Oshkosh All-Stars: Sheboygan wins series 2–0

- Game 1: February 20, 1943 @ Sheboygan: Sheboygan 50, Oshkosh 38
- Game 2: February 21, 1943 @ Oshkosh: Sheboygan 56, Oshkosh 47

=== NBL Championship ===
(2) Sheboygan Red Skins vs. (1) Fort Wayne Zollner Pistons: Sheboygan wins series 2–1

- Game 1: March 1, 1943 @ Fort Wayne: Sheboygan 55, Fort Wayne 50
- Game 2: March 2, 1943 @ Sheboygan: Fort Wayne 50, Sheboygan 45
- Game 3: March 9, 1943 @ Fort Wayne: Sheboygan 30, Fort Wayne 29

=== Awards and honors ===
- NBL Coach of the Year – Carl Roth
- First Team All-NBL – Ed Dancker
- Second Team All-NBL – Buddy Jeannette and Ken Suesens
- NBL Rookie of the Year – Ken Buehler
- All-Time NBL Team – Ed Dancker and Buddy Jeannette

== World Professional Basketball Tournament ==
For the fifth year in a row, the Sheboygan Red Skins would participate in the annual World Professional Basketball Tournament in Chicago, which the 1943 event was held on March 15–18, 1943 and was mostly held by independently ran teams alongside the four remaining NBL teams from this season due in part to World War II. The Red Skins were given a first round bye alongside last year's NBL/WPBT champions in the Oshkosh All-Stars, the world famous Harlem Globetrotters, and the Washington Bears (who held players from the legendarily independent New York Renaissance all-black team) due to Sheboygan being the champions of the NBL this year. Unfortunately for Sheboygan, they would lose their first and only match they played in the tournament by competing against the team they had just defeated in the NBL Finals, the Fort Wayne Zollner Pistons, with a 48–40 loss. Fort Wayne would end up losing their semifinal match to the Oshkosh All-Stars (though beat the independent Dayton Dive Bombers in the third place game), while Oshkosh would lose the championship match to the Washington Bears (who only lost one time during their over 50 or so games played in the independent 1942–43 season they played) to have the Bears be the last independent team to win the WPBT championship in the tournament's history. Despite the Red Skins only playing in one game for this tournament, Buddy Jeannette would still be voted in as a member of the All-Tournament First Team for his efforts held in the one game he played in the event against the Fort Wayne Zollner Pistons.

=== Game played ===
- Sheboygan had a bye in the first round.
- Lost quarterfinal round (40–48) to the Fort Wayne Zollner Pistons.

=== Awards and honors ===
- Buddy Jeannette, All-Tournament First Team
