= List of NBA players (K) =

This is a list of National Basketball Association players whose last names begin with K.

The list also includes players from the American National Basketball League (NBL), the Basketball Association of America (BAA), and the original American Basketball Association (ABA). All of these leagues contributed to the formation of the present-day NBA.

Individuals who played in the NBL prior to its 1949 merger with the BAA are listed in italics, as they are not traditionally listed in the NBA's official player registers.

== K ==
- Mfiondu Kabengele
- Whitey Kachan
- George Kaftan
- Ed Kalafat
- Georgios Kalaitzakis
- Ryan Kalkbrenner
- Chris Kaman
- Frank Kaminsky
- Enes Kanter
- Ralph Kaplowitz
- Jason Kapono
- Tony Kappen
- Alex Karaban
- Sergey Karasev
- Coby Karl
- George Karl
- Tony Kaseta
- Ed Kasid
- Mario Kasun
- Leo Katkaveck
- Bob Kauffman
- Sasha Kaun
- Wibs Kautz
- Yuki Kawamura
- Clarence Kea
- Mike Kearns
- Tommy Kearns
- Adam Keefe
- Harold Keeling
- Trevor Keels
- Billy Keller
- Gary Keller
- Jack Keller
- Ken Keller
- Kylor Kelley
- Rich Kelley
- Clark Kellogg
- Arvesta Kelly
- Jerry Kelly
- Miles Kelly
- Ryan Kelly
- Tom Kelly
- Tony Kelly
- Greg Kelser
- Ben Kelso
- Shawn Kemp
- Tim Kempton
- Frank Kendrick
- Luke Kennard
- Bill Kennedy
- D. J. Kennedy
- Goo Kennedy
- Joe Kennedy
- Larry Kenney
- Larry Kenon
- Jayson Kent
- Bill Kenville
- Jonathan Kerner
- Johnny Kerr
- Steve Kerr
- Jack Kerris
- Jerome Kersey
- Tom Kerwin
- Alec Kessler
- Robert Kessler
- Walker Kessler
- Paul Kessy
- Lari Ketner
- Braxton Key
- Julius Keye
- Randolph Keys
- Victor Khryapa
- Jason Kidd
- Stanton Kidd
- Warren Kidd
- Michael Kidd-Gilchrist
- Irv Kiffin
- Jack Kiley
- Earnie Killum
- Carl Kilpatrick
- Sean Kilpatrick
- Toby Kimball
- Bo Kimble
- Stan Kimbrough
- Chad Kinch
- Albert King
- Bernard King
- Chris King
- Dan King
- Dolly King
- Frankie King
- George King (b. 1928)
- George King (b. 1994)
- Gerard King
- Jim King
- Jimmy King
- Leroy King
- Louis King
- Loyd King
- Maurice King
- Reggie King
- Rich King
- Ron King
- Stacey King
- Tom King
- Willie King
- Bob Kinney
- Joe Kinney
- Tarence Kinsey
- Andrei Kirilenko
- Alex Kirk
- Walt Kirk
- Wilbur Kirkland
- Corey Kispert
- Jim Kissane
- Doug Kistler
- Curtis Kitchen
- Greg Kite
- Bob Kitterman
- Kerry Kittles
- Maxi Kleber
- Dick Klein
- Joe Kleine
- Linas Kleiza
- Leo Klier
- Bobi Klintman
- Louis Klotz
- Duane Klueh
- Lonnie Kluttz
- Dalton Knecht
- Billy Knight
- Bob Knight
- Brandin Knight
- Brandon Knight
- Brevin Knight
- Nathan Knight
- Negele Knight
- Ron Knight
- Toby Knight
- Travis Knight
- Buzz Knoblauch
- Lee Knorek
- Dick Knostman
- Rod Knowles
- Kevin Knox II
- Kon Knueppel
- Bart Kofoed
- Don Kojis
- Eddie Kolar
- Otto Kolar
- Tyler Kolek
- Christian Koloko
- Bill Komenich
- Milo Komenich
- Howie Komives
- Jon Koncak
- John Konchar
- Tom Kondla
- Bud Koper
- Joe Kopicki
- Furkan Korkmaz
- Frank Kornet
- Luke Kornet
- Yaroslav Korolev
- Hal Korovin
- Kyle Korver
- Tony Koski
- Len Kosmalski
- Andy Kostecka
- Harold Kottman
- John Kotz
- Kosta Koufos
- Tom Kozelko
- Ronald Kozlicki
- Vic Krafft
- Arvid Kramer
- Barry Kramer
- Bob Kramer
- Joel Kramer
- Steve Kramer
- Dan Kraus
- Herb Krautblatt
- Viacheslav Kravtsov
- Jim Krebs
- Vít Krejčí
- Wayne Kreklow
- Tommy Kron
- Tom Kropp
- Nenad Krstić
- Joe Kruse
- Larry Krystkowiak
- Ray Krzoska
- Steve Kuberski
- Leo Kubiak
- Vito Kubilus
- Les Kuplic
- Bruce Kuczenski
- Frank Kudelka
- John Kuester
- Ray Kuka
- Toni Kukoč
- Arnoldas Kulboka
- Jonathan Kuminga
- Kevin Kunnert
- Terry Kunze
- Mitch Kupchak
- C. J. Kupec
- Rodions Kurucs
- Rob Kurz
- İbrahim Kutluay
- Kyle Kuzma
- Ognjen Kuzmić
- Mindaugas Kuzminskas
- Ed Kweller
