= List of NBA players (N–O) =

This is a list of National Basketball Association players whose last names begin with N or O.

The list also includes players from the American National Basketball League (NBL), the Basketball Association of America (BAA), and the original American Basketball Association (ABA). All of these leagues contributed to the formation of the present-day NBA.

Individuals who played in the NBL prior to its 1949 merger with the BAA are listed in italics, as they are not traditionally listed in the NBA's official player registers.

== N ==
- Hamady N'Diaye
- Makhtar N'Diaye
- Mamadou N'Diaye
- Boniface N'Dong
- Bob Naber
- Boštjan Nachbar
- Abdel Nader
- Jerry Nagel
- Jake Nagode
- Fritz Nagy
- Lee Nailon
- Eduardo Nájera
- Larry Nance
- Larry Nance Jr.
- Pete Nance
- Shabazz Napier
- Paul Napolitano
- Bob Nash
- Cotton Nash
- Steve Nash
- Swen Nater
- Howard Nathan
- Calvin Natt
- Kenny Natt
- Willie Naulls
- Juan Carlos Navarro
- Maurice Ndour
- Craig Neal
- Gary Neal
- Jim Neal
- Lloyd Neal
- Ed Nealy
- Lyle Neat
- Nemanja Nedović
- Al Negratti
- George Nelmark
- Barry Nelson
- DeMarcus Nelson
- Don Nelson
- Grant Nelson
- Jameer Nelson
- Louie Nelson
- Ron Nelson
- Andrew Nembhard
- RJ Nembhard
- Ruben Nembhard
- Ryan Nembhard
- Dick Nemelka
- Nenê
- Tyrone Nesby
- Aaron Nesmith
- Martin Nessley
- Rasho Nesterović
- Raul Neto
- Bob Netolicky
- Bobby Neu
- Johnny Neumann
- Paul Neumann
- Chuck Nevitt
- Melvin Newbern
- Ivano Newbill
- Ira Newble
- Asa Newell
- Mike Newlin
- Johnny Newman
- Malik Newman
- Dave Newmark
- Bill Newton
- Tristen Newton
- Georges Niang
- Demetris Nichols
- Jack Nichols
- Oren Nichols
- Andrew Nicholson
- Gaylon Nickerson
- Carl Nicks
- Yanic Konan Niederhäuser
- Rich Niemann
- Richie Niemiera
- Mike Niles
- Kurt Nimphius
- Fred Nimz
- Tommy Nisbet
- Daishen Nix
- Dyron Nix
- Norm Nixon
- Zeke Nnaji
- Joakim Noah
- Chuck Noble
- Andrés Nocioni
- David Noel
- Nerlens Noel
- Paul Noel
- Lucas Nogueira
- Jim Nolan
- Paul Nolen
- Jeff Nordgaard
- Bevo Nordmann
- Irv Noren
- Johnny Norlander
- Coniel Norman
- Ken Norman
- Audie Norris
- Miles Norris
- Moochie Norris
- Sylvester Norris
- Woody Norris
- Zach Norvell Jr.
- Willie Norwood
- George Nostrand
- Stan Noszka
- Mike Novak
- Steve Novak
- John Novotny
- Paul Nowak
- Jaylen Nowell
- Markquis Nowell
- Mel Nowell
- Dirk Nowitzki
- Frank Ntilikina
- Bob Nugent
- Kendrick Nunn
- James Nunnally
- Jusuf Nurkić
- Dennis Nutt
- David Nwaba
- Jordan Nwora
- Julius Nwosu

== O ==
- Charles O'Bannon
- Ed O'Bannon
- John O'Boyle
- Bob O'Brien
- Jim O'Brien (b. 1950)
- Jim O'Brien (b. 1951)
- J. J. O'Brien
- John O'Brien
- Ralph O'Brien
- Tommy O'Brien
- Johnny O'Bryant III
- Patrick O'Bryant
- Dermie O'Connell
- Connie O'Connor
- Andy O'Donnell
- Jim O'Donnell
- Neil O'Donnell
- Buddy O'Grady
- Fran O'Hanlon
- Dick O'Keefe
- Tommy O'Keefe
- Hank O'Keeffe
- Mike O'Koren
- Grady O'Malley
- Jermaine O'Neal
- Shaquille O'Neal
- Royce O'Neale
- Mike O'Neill
- Kyle O'Quinn
- Bud O'Rourke
- Bob O'Shaughnessy
- Kevin O'Shea
- Garland O'Shields
- Dan O'Sullivan
- Tom O'Toole
- Charles Oakley
- Red Oberbruner
- Jack Oberst
- Fabricio Oberto
- Daniel Ochefu
- Russ Ochsenhirt
- Greg Oden
- Lamar Odom
- Josh Oduro
- Bud Ogden
- Ralph Ogden
- Alan Ogg
- Don Ohl
- Tim Ohlbrecht
- Semi Ojeleye
- Emeka Okafor
- Jahlil Okafor
- Toby Okani
- Chuma Okeke
- Élie Okobo
- Josh Okogie
- Onyeka Okongwu
- Ebuka Okorie
- Isaac Okoro
- KZ Okpala
- Felix Okpara
- Mehmet Okur
- Victor Oladipo
- Hakeem Olajuwon
- Mark Olberding
- Lachlan Olbrich
- Jawann Oldham
- John Oldham
- Frank Oleynick
- Quincy Olivari
- John Olive
- Brian Oliver
- Cameron Oliver
- Dean Oliver
- Jimmy Oliver
- Vince Oliver
- Kevin Ollie
- Gene Ollrich
- Michael Olowokandi
- Bud Olsen
- Jim Olsen
- Oscar Olson
- Kelly Olynyk
- Norchad Omier
- Eugene Omoruyi
- Miye Oni
- Arinze Onuaku
- Chinanu Onuaku
- Bernard Opper
- Eddie Oram
- Barry Orms
- Johnny Orr (b. 1918)
- Johnny Orr (b. 1927)
- Louis Orr
- José Ortiz
- Daniel Orton
- Chuck Osborne
- Leo Osiewalski
- Cedi Osman
- Wally Osterkorn
- Greg Ostertag
- Matt Othick
- Don Otten
- Mac Otten
- Daniel Oturu
- Frank Otway
- Kelly Oubre Jr.
- Bo Outlaw
- Travis Outlaw
- Claude Overton
- Doug Overton
- Andre Owens
- Billy Owens
- Chris Owens
- Eddie Owens
- Jim Owens
- Keith Owens
- Larry Owens
- Red Owens
- Tariq Owens
- Tom Owens
- Ray Owes
- Olumide Oyedeji
- Jack Ozburn
