= 1942–43 Fort Wayne Zollner Pistons season =

Second season of the Pistons in the NBL

- Division champions
- Head coach: Carl Bennett
- Owners: Fred and Janet Zollner
- Arena: North Side High School Gym, Fort Wayne, Indiana

Results
- Record: 17–6 (.739)
- Place: Division: 1st
- Playoff finish: Lost to Sheboygan Red Skins in NBL Championship, 2-1
- Stats at Basketball Reference
- Radio: WOWO

The 1942–43 season was the second season of the Fort Wayne Zollner Pistons franchise in the National Basketball League. The Pistons came into the season off of a championship appearance and ended the year with a 17–6 record that earned them the #1 seed in the playoffs and set the team up as clear favorites to win the championship. After defeating Chicago in the first round in 3 games the Pistons were upset by the Sheboygan Red Skins in the NBL Championship Series. Following this season's conclusion, the Zollner Pistons' players (who were also employed into the local Zollner Piston Company during their days in the NBL) would split the profits that the team had earned throughout the season while playing basketball on a professional basis, which resulted in their players earning several thousand dollars of bonus revenue through the split payment at hand while also working their jobs that focused mostly on machinery (thus having the best payment plan out of the four remaining NBL teams that season when compared to the Chicago Studebaker Flyers' players working for and being owned by the United Auto Workers Union and both the Oshkosh All-Stars and Sheboygan Red Skins operating in manners similar to the nearby Green Bay Packers NFL team), which later helped result in the increased growth of salaries for all professional sports players, not just those in the sport of basketball. After the season, Red Skins guard Buddy Jeannette joined Fort Wayne to form one of the best backcourts in NBL history with Bobby McDermott, as well as one of basketball's earliest examples of a super team with Jerry Bush, Jake Pelkington, and Curly Armstrong also being on the team this season as well.

== Roster ==
1942–43 Fort Wayne Zollner Pistons roster
Players

Pos.	No.	Player	Height	Weight	DOB	From
G/F		Curly Armstrong	5 ft 11 in (1.80 m)	170 lb (77 kg)	1918-11-01	Indiana
G		Paul Birch	6 ft 1 in (1.85 m)	190 lb (86 kg)	1910-01-04	Duquesne
F/C		Jerry Bush	6 ft 3 in (1.91 m)	200 lb (91 kg)	1914-09-06	St. John's
F		Gus Doerner	6 ft 2 in (1.88 m)	190 lb (86 kg)	1922-02-27	Evansville
G/F		Dale Hamilton	6 ft 0 in (1.83 m)	180 lb (82 kg)	1919-08-16	Franklin (IN)
G/F		Jack Keller	6 ft 2 in (1.88 m)	185 lb (84 kg)	1922-06-22	North Side HS (IN)
G		Bobby McDermott	5 ft 11 in (1.80 m)	180 lb (82 kg)	1914-01-07	Flushing HS (NY)
F/C		Jake Pelkington	6 ft 6 in (1.98 m)	220 lb (100 kg)	1916-01-03	Manhattan
G/F		Herm Schaefer	6 ft 0 in (1.83 m)	175 lb (79 kg)	1919-12-20	Indiana
F/C		Carlisle Towery	6 ft 4 in (1.93 m)	210 lb (95 kg)	1920-06-20	Western Kentucky

Coaches
Head coach

Carl Bennett

Legend
- (DP) Unsigned draft pick
- (FA) Free agent
- (S) Suspended
- Injured

Roster

Note: Gus Doerner was not a part of the playoff roster this season due to him being enlisted in the U.S. military during this period of time since World War II was starting to take its toll upon the sports world by this point in time.

== Regular season ==
=== Season standings ===
Pos.	League Standings	Wins	Losses	Win %
1	Fort Wayne Zollner Pistons	17	6	.739
2	Sheboygan Red Skins	12	11	.522
3	Oshkosh All-Stars	11	12	.478
4	Chicago Studebaker Flyers	8	15	.348
5	Toledo Jim White Chevrolets^{†}	0	4	.000
^{†}Toledo disbanded during the season

=== NBL Schedule ===
Not to be confused with exhibition or other non-NBL scheduled games that did not count towards Fort Wayne's official NBL record for this season. An official database created by John Grasso detailing every NBL match possible (outside of two matches that the Kankakee Gallagher Trojans won over the Dayton Metropolitans in 1938) would be released in 2026 showcasing every team's official schedules throughout their time spent in the NBL. As such, these are the official results recorded for the Fort Wayne Zollner Pistons during their second season in the NBL.

#	Date	Opponent	Score	Record
1	December 1	Chicago	47–54	0–1
2	December 3	@ Sheboygan	54–45	1–1
3	December 5	@ Oshkosh	38–47	1–2
4	December 8	Toledo	70–51	2–2
5	December 23	Oshkosh	43–46	2–3
6	December 29	Sheboygan	58–45	3–3
7	January 5	Chicago	62–49	4–3
8	January 8	N Chicago	78–62	5–3
9	January 9	@ Oshkosh	39–47	5–4
10	January 10	@ Sheboygan	42–40	6–4
11	January 12	Oshkosh	43–34	7–4
12	January 17	@ Chicago	64–59	8–4
13	January 19	Chicago	46–38	9–4
14	January 26	Sheboygan	55–36	10–4
15	January 27	Chicago	61–54	11–4
16	January 30	@ Oshkosh	40–33	12–4
17	January 31	@ Sheboygan	31–47	12–5
18	February 2	Chicago	73–50	13–5
19	February 9	Oshkosh	47–44	14–5
20	February 13	@ Oshkosh	50–47	15–5
21	February 14	@ Chicago	45–44	16–5
22	February 16	@ Sheboygan	54–48	17–5
23	February 18	@ Sheboygan	35–49	17–6

== NBL Playoffs ==
=== NBL Semifinals ===
(1) Fort Wayne Zollner Pistons vs. (4) Chicago Studebaker Flyers: Fort Wayne wins series 2–1

- Game 1: February 20, 1943 @ Fort Wayne: Fort Wayne 49, Chicago 37
- Game 2: February 22, 1943 @ Chicago: Chicago 45, Fort Wayne 32
- Game 3: February 23, 1943 @ Fort Wayne: Fort Wayne 44, Chicago 32

=== NBL Championship ===
(1) Fort Wayne Zollner Pistons vs. (2) Sheboygan Red Skins: Sheboygan wins series 2–1

- Game 1: March 1, 1943 @ Fort Wayne: Sheboygan 55, Fort Wayne 50
- Game 2: March 2, 1943 @ Sheboygan: Fort Wayne 50, Sheboygan 45
- Game 3: March 9, 1943 @ Fort Wayne: Sheboygan 30, Fort Wayne 29

=== Awards and honors ===
- Bobby McDermott would lead the league in total points scored this season with 316 total points made. Not only that, but he also led the league in field goals made this season with 132 total field goals made this season as well.
- NBL Most Valuable Player – Bobby McDermott
- First Team All-NBL – Bobby McDermott and Curly Armstrong
- Second Team All-NBL – Jerry Bush
- All-Time NBL Team – Bobby McDermott and Jerry Bush

== World Professional Basketball Tournament ==
For the third straight year in a row (second in a row while representing the NBL), the Fort Wayne Zollner Pistons would participate in the annual World Professional Basketball Tournament in Chicago, which the 1943 event was held on March 15–18, 1943 and featured 12 teams that were mostly independently ran alongside the remaining four National Basketball League teams due to World War II. In the first round, the Zollner Pistons competed against the Indianapolis Pure Oils, who were actually the Indianapolis Kautskys team that briefly returned to the NBL before leaving due to World War II, though decided to compete under the temporary independent moniker of the Indianapolis Pure Oils. With that being said, Fort Wayne would have a tough go at the former NBL turned independent squad, but they would defeat the Pure Oils with a 57–52 win.

In the quarterfinal round, the Zollner Pistons would have what was to be considered to be an NBL Finals rematch with the new champions of that league, the Sheboygan Red Skins. Looking at this match as motivation for revenge against losing the NBL championship to Sheboygan, Fort Wayne managed to play with enough fire to defeat the Red Skins for a 48–40 win to not only avenge their NBL championship loss, but also move onto the semifinal round.

Entering the semifinals, the Zollner Pistons saw themselves go up against the former champions of the NBL and last year's champions of the WPBT, the Oshkosh All-Stars. Unfortunately for Fort Wayne, despite them entering this match as the favorites of that match, they would end up being upset by the defending WPBT champion All-Stars 40–39, meaning that Oshkosh would enter the championship round to try and defend their title, while the Zollner Pistons were forced to compete in the consolation third place game between the losers of the independently ran Washington Bears and Dayton Dive Bombers instead.

For the third place game, Fort Wayne had to go up against the Dayton Dive Bombers, who were run by players stationed at the Wright Field in Riverside, Ohio and led by future professional player Hal Tidrick. Feeling the sting of their previous loss to Oshkosh, the Zollner Pistons managed to push back with their highest-scoring game of the tournament that year with 58 points scored for their 58–52 win over the Dive Bombers, with Curly Armstrong also being named the tournament's MVP alongside an All-Tournament First Team member despite not playing in the championship game and Bobby McDermott being named a member of the All-Tournament Second Team. As for the championship game, the independently ran Washington Bears (who were manned by New York Renaissance players at the time and only lost once during their independent season of play) managed to crush the defending champion Oshkosh All-Stars with a 43–31 victory for the last time an independent team would ever be named the winners of the WPBT.

=== Games ===
- Won first round (57–52) over the Indianapolis Pure Oils
- Won quarterfinal round (48–40) over the Sheboygan Red Skins
- Lost semifinal round (39–40) to the Oshkosh All-Stars
- Won third place consolation game (58–52) over the Dayton Dive Bombers

=== Awards and honors ===
- Curly Armstrong, All-Tournament First Team, WPBT MVP
- Bobby McDermott, All-Tournament Second Team, WPBT leading scorer (50 points scored in four games)
