= Nelimarkka =

Surname list

Nelimarkka is a Finnish surname. Notable people with the surname include:

- Eero Nelimarkka (1891–1977), Finnish painter
- George Nelimarkka (1917–2010), American basketball player
