= William Ash =

William or Bill Ash may refer to:

- William Ash (MP) (died 1411), English Member of Parliament for Dorchester in 1394
- William H. Ash (1859–1908), American former slave and member of the Virginia House of Delegates
- Bill Ash (1917–2014), American-born British writer, Marxist, and World War II RCAF pilot
- Bill Ash (basketball), American professional basketball player in the 1940s
- William Ash (actor) (born 1977), British actor

== See also ==
- William Ashe (disambiguation)
