= Sam Lacy =

American sportswriter

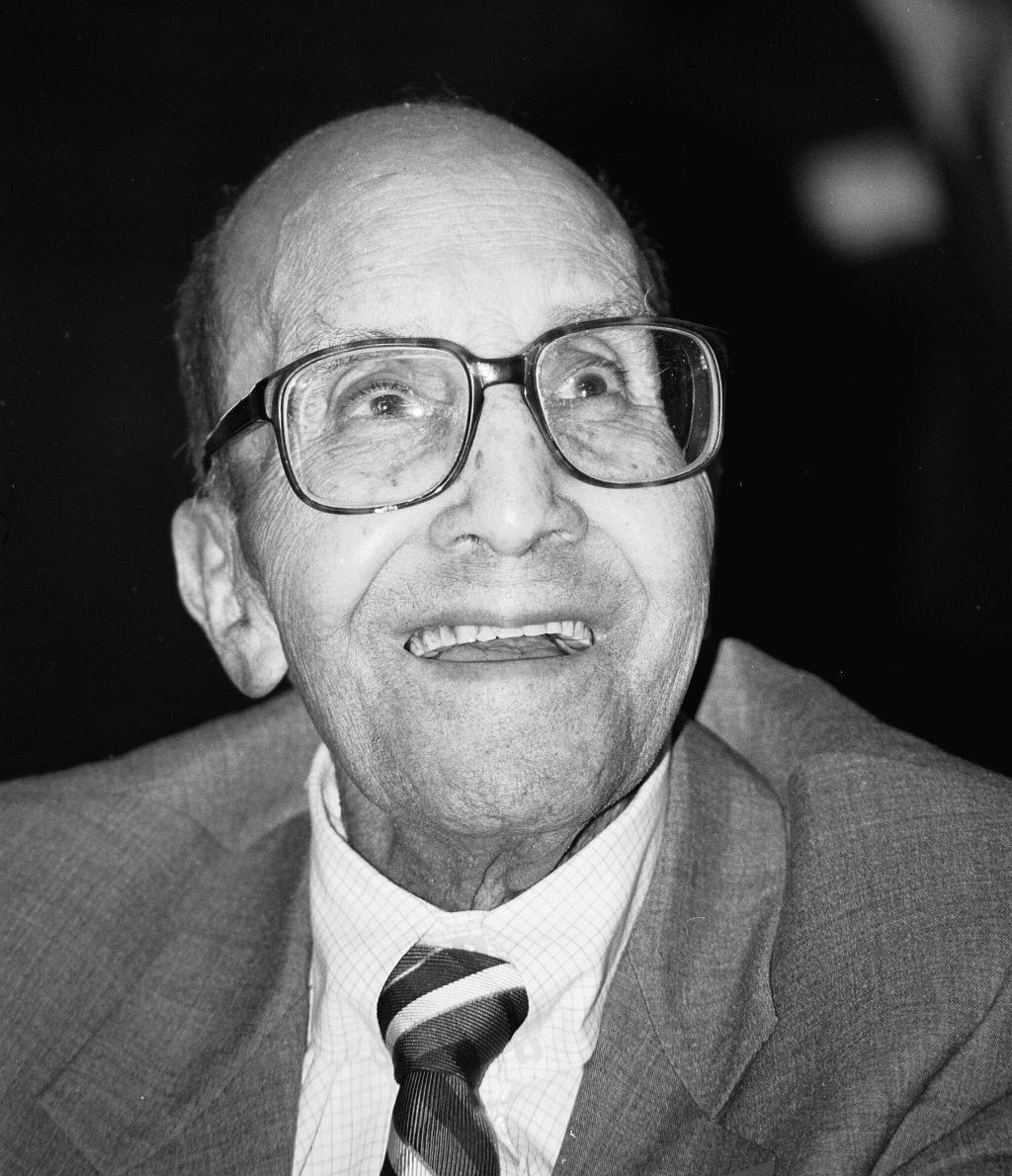
- Lacy at his 99th birthday party
- Born: Samuel Harold Lacy; October 23, 1903; Mystic, Connecticut, US
- Died: May 8, 2003 (aged 99); Washington, D.C., US
- Education: Howard University
- Occupations: Sportswriter, editor, TV/radio commentator
- Years active: 1920–2003
- Spouse(s): Roberta Robinson (m. 1927–1952) (divorce); Barbara Robinson (m. 1953–1969) (her death)
- Children: 2

Samuel Harold Lacy (October 23, 1903 – May 8, 2003) was an African-American and Native American sportswriter, reporter, columnist, editor, and television/radio commentator who worked in the sports journalism field for parts of nine decades. Credited as a persuasive figure in the movement to racially integrate sports, Lacy in 1948 became one of the first black members of the Baseball Writers' Association of America (BBWAA). In 1997, he received the J. G. Taylor Spink Award for outstanding baseball writing from the BBWAA.

== Upbringing ==
Lacy was born on October 23, 1903, in Mystic, Connecticut, to Samuel Erskine Lacy, a law firm researcher, and Rose Lacy, a full-blooded Shinnecock. The family moved to Washington, D.C., when Sam was a young boy. In his youth he developed a love for baseball, and spent his spare time at Griffith Stadium, home ballpark for the Washington Senators. His house at 13th and U streets was just five blocks from the stadium, and Sam would often run errands for players and chase down balls during batting practice.

In his youth Sam witnessed racist mistreatment of his family while they watched the annual Senators' team parade through the streets of Washington to the stadium on opening day. Sam later recalled what happened after his elderly father cheered and waved an "I Saw Walter Johnson Pitch" pennant:

Fans like my father would line up for hours to watch their heroes pass by. And so there he was, age 79, out there cheering with the rest of them, calling all the players by name, just happy to be there. And then it happened. One of the white players—I won't say which one—just gave him this nasty look and, as he passed by, spat right in his face. Right in that nice old man's face. That hurt my father terribly. And you know, as big a fan as he had been, he never went to another game as long as he lived, which was seven more years. Oh, we've come a long way since then. But we've still got a long way to go.

As a teenager Sam worked for the Senators as a food vendor, selling popcorn and peanuts in the stadium's segregated Jim Crow section in right field. Lacy also caddied for British golfer Long Jim Barnes at the 1921 U.S. Open, held at nearby Columbia Country Club. When Barnes won the tournament, he gave Lacy a $200 tip.

Lacy graduated from Armstrong Technical High School in Washington, where he played football, baseball and basketball. He enrolled at Howard University, where in 1923 he earned a bachelor's degree in physical education, a field he thought might lead him to a coaching career. Lacy played semi-pro baseball after college, pitching for the local Hillsdale club in Washington. He also refereed DC-area high school, college and recreational basketball games, while coaching and instructing youth sports teams.

== Early career ==
While in college, Lacy began covering sports part-time for the Washington Tribune, a local African-American newspaper. He continued writing for the paper following his graduation, and also worked as a sports commentator for radio stations WOL and WINX in the early 1930s.

He joined the Tribune full-time in 1926, and became sports editor shortly thereafter. In 1929 Lacy left the paper for the summer to play semi-pro baseball in Connecticut while his family remained in Washington. He returned to the paper in 1930, and once again became sports editor in 1933.

During his tenure Lacy covered Jesse Owens' medal-winning performances at the 1936 Summer Olympics in Berlin, the world heavyweight title fights of boxer Joe Louis (including his victory over Max Schmeling), and the rise of Negro league stars such as Satchel Paige, Josh Gibson and Cool Papa Bell.

In 1936 Lacy began lobbying Senators owner Clark Griffith to consider adding star players from the Negro leagues; in particular, those playing for the Homestead Grays team that leased Griffith Stadium for its home games. He finally gained a face-to-face meeting with Griffith on the subject in December 1937. Griffith listened but was not keen on the idea, as Lacy later told a Philadelphia reporter:

I used that old cliché about Washington being first in war, first in peace, and last in the American League, and that he could remedy that. But he told me that the climate wasn't right. He pointed out there were a lot of Southern ballplayers in the league, that there would be constant confrontations, and, moreover, that it would break up the Negro Leagues. He saw the Negro Leagues as a source of revenue.

Lacy also wrote that Griffith voiced concern that the fall of the Negro leagues would "put about 400 colored guys out of work." Lacy retorted in a column, "When Abraham Lincoln signed the Emancipation Proclamation, he put 400,000 black people out of jobs."

In October 1937, Lacy broke his first major story when he reported the true racial origins of multi-sport athlete Wilmeth Sidat-Singh. Syracuse University had claimed Sidat-Singh was of Hindu and Indian heritage, when in truth his widowed mother had remarried, to an Indian doctor. Prior to a football game against the University of Maryland, Lacy revealed Sidat-Singh had been born to black parents in Washington, D.C., and trumpeted the news as a sign the color barrier at segregated Maryland was about to fall. When Maryland officials refused to play the game unless Sidat-Singh was barred from the field, Syracuse removed him from the team and lost the match 13-0. The controversy prompted an outcry against both schools' policies and actions, and Sidat-Singh was allowed to play against Maryland the following year as he led Syracuse to a decisive 53-0 win. Lacy drew criticism in some circles for divulging Sidat-Singh's ethnicity, but maintained his stance that racial progress demanded honesty.

== The 1940s ==
In August 1941 Lacy moved to Chicago to work for another black newspaper, the Chicago Defender, where he served as its assistant national editor. While in the Midwest he made repeated attempts to engage Major League Baseball commissioner Kenesaw Mountain Landis on the topic of desegregating the game, writing numerous letters, but his efforts went unanswered.

Lacy also targeted blacks in management and ownership positions with the Negro leagues, some of whom had a vested financial interest in keeping the game segregated. In a Defender editorial, he wrote:

No selfishness on the part of Negro owners hip, nor appeasement ... to the Southern reactionaries in baseball must stand in the way of the advancement of qualified Negro players.

On January 4, 1944, Lacy returned East, joining the Afro-American in Baltimore as sports editor and columnist. He continued to press his case for integrating baseball through his columns and editorials, and many other black newspapers followed suit. In one such piece in 1945, Lacy wrote:

A man whose skin is white or red or yellow has been acceptable. But a man whose character may be of the highest and whose ability may be Ruthian has been barred completely from the sport because he is colored.

However, Lacy did not make any headway on the issue until Landis died in late 1944. Lacy began a dialogue with Brooklyn Dodgers owner Branch Rickey, and Landis's successor in the commissioner's office, Happy Chandler, lent his support to the effort. It ultimately led to Jackie Robinson signing with the Dodgers' minor league team, the Montreal Royals on October 23, 1945, which was Lacy's 42nd birthday.

Lacy spent the next three years covering Jackie's struggle for acceptance and a spot in the big leagues. He traveled with Robinson to the Royals' games at various International League cities throughout the Northeast, to the Dodgers' spring training site in Daytona Beach, Florida, to competing clubs' camps throughout the deep South, and to Cuba for winter baseball.

Like Robinson and the other black athletes he had covered, Lacy encountered racist indignities and hardships. He was barred from press boxes at certain ballparks, dined at the same segregated restaurants with Jackie, and stayed at the same "blacks only" boarding houses as Robinson. Robinson would eventually break MLB's color barrier in 1947 with the Dodgers, but Lacy never allowed their racial bond to cloud his journalistic objectivity. During spring training in 1948, Lacy chastised Robinson in print for arriving 15 pounds overweight, his "lackadaisical attitude" and for "laying down" on the job. He also plastered details of Robinson's personal life throughout his articles, including the dining, shopping, wardrobe and travel habits of Jackie and his wife, Rachel.

Lacy resisted having his own personal bouts with racism become part of the integration storyline, and kept the focus on the athletes he covered:

There were a lot of things that were bothering him. [Robinson] was taking so much abuse that he said to me that he didn't know whether or not he was going to be able to go through with this because it was just becoming so intolerable, that they were throwing everything at him.

Lacy made sure to cover all angles of the race issue. In 1947, he reported on the interaction between white St. Louis Browns outfielder and rumored racist Paul Lehner, and his black teammate Willard Brown:

Brown used a towel to wipe his face and neck. Lehner reached over, picked up the same towel, wiped his face and neck. He handed it back to Brown and the latter wiped again. A little later, Lehner repeated the act. Folks, this was something I saw, not something I heard about.

In 1948, he reacted to the death of Babe Ruth not with adulation for the star but with spite toward Ruth's personal behavior:

[Ruth was] an irresponsible rowdy who could neither eat with dignity nor drink with judgment who thrived on cuss-words and brawls whose 15-year-old mentality led him to buy one bright-colored automobile after another to smash up. The rest of the world can hail the departed hero as a model for its youth but I do not wish my [son] Tim to use him as an example. And there is absolutely nothing racial about this observation. The same applies to [black boxer] Jack Johnson, who is also dead.

Lacy covered the first interracial college football game ever played in the state of Maryland when all-black Maryland State College faced all-white Trenton (N.J.) College in 1949:

Down here on the Eastern Shore, where 32 lynchings have occurred since 1882, democracy lifted its face toward the Sun on Saturday.

== Later career ==
Not content to see black ballplayers reach the major leagues, Lacy began pushing for equal pay for athletes of color, and for an end to segregated team accommodations during road trips. His first success on those fronts was persuading New York Giants general manager Chub Feeney to address the latter issue:

I pointed out to Chub Feeney that he had guys like Willie Mays and Monte Irvin and Hank Thompson holed up in some little hotel while the rest of the players, people who might never even wear a major-league uniform, were staying at the famous Palace. Chub just looked at me and said, 'Sam, you're right.' He got on the phone to (Giants owner) Horace Stoneham, and that was the end of that.

Over the ensuing decades, Lacy pushed for the Baseball Hall of Fame to induct deserving Negro league players, and later criticized the Hall for placing such players in a separate wing. He also pressured national TV networks over the lack of black broadcasters, criticized Major League Baseball for the absence of black umpires, targeted corporations for their lack of sponsorships of black athletes in certain white-dominated sports including golf, and highlighted the National Football League's dearth of black head coaches.

Stories covered extensively by Lacy included the Grand Slam tennis titles won by Althea Gibson and Arthur Ashe two decades apart, Wilma Rudolph's three track & field gold medals at the 1960 Olympic Games in Rome, and Lee Elder playing at Augusta National in 1975 as the first black golfer in The Masters tournament.

In 1954, Lacy questioned why the city of Milwaukee had chosen to honor Braves outfielder Hank Aaron with a day in his honor a mere two months into his playing career:

Why? Why is it we feel every colored player in the major leagues is entitled to a day? Why can't we wait until, through consistent performance or longevity, the player in question merits special attention?

Lacy worked as a television sports commentator for WBAL-TV from 1968 to 1976.

Lacy remained with the Baltimore Afro-American for nearly 60 years, and became widely known for his regular "A to Z" columns and his continued championing of racial equity. The onset of arthritis in his hands in his late 70s left him unable to type, so he wrote his columns out longhand. Even into his 80s he maintained his routine of waking at 3 A.M. three days a week, driving from his Washington home to his Baltimore office, working eight hours, and playing nine holes of golf in the afternoon. Lacy could no longer drive after a suffering a stroke in 1999, so he rode to the office with his son, Tim, who followed in his footsteps as a sportswriter for the Afro-American.

In 1999, Lacy teamed with colleague Moses J. Newson, a former executive editor at the Afro-American, to write his autobiography, Fighting for Fairness: The Life Story of Hall of Fame Sportswriter Sam Lacy.

Sam Lacy wrote his final column for the paper just days before his death at age 99 in 2003, and filed the piece from his hospital bed. In 1999, he explained his rationale for staying with the Afro-American while spurning more lucrative offers:

No other paper in the country would have given me the kind of license. I've made my own decisions. I cover everything that want to. I sacrificed a few dollars, true, but I lived a comfortable life. I get paid enough to be satisfied. I don't expect to die rich.

== Personal life ==
Sam Lacy married Alberta Robinson in 1927. They had a son, Samuel Howe (Tim) Lacy, and a daughter, Michaelyn T. Lacy (now Michaelyn Harris). Sam and Alberta divorced in 1952, and Sam married Barbara Robinson in 1953. Barbara died in 1969, but Sam never remarried.

As of December 2010, Tim Lacy remains a columnist at the Afro-American at the age of 72.

Lacy's paternal grandfather, Henry Erskine Lacy, was the first black detective in the Washington, D.C., police department.

== Death ==
Sam Lacy died at age 99 of heart and kidney failure on May 8, 2003, at Washington Hospital Center in Washington, D.C. He had checked into the hospital a week earlier due to a loss of appetite. Besides his children, survivors included four grandchildren and five great-grandchildren. His funeral was held on May 16, 2003, at Mount Zion Baptist Church in Washington, D.C., with burial at Lincoln Memorial Cemetery in Suitland, Maryland.

== Awards and honors ==
In 1948, Lacy became one of the first black members of the Baseball Writers' Association of America, preceded by Wendell Smith who became a member in 1947.

In 1984, Lacy became the first black journalist to be enshrined in the Maryland Media Hall of Fame.

In 1985, Lacy was inducted into the Black Athletes Hall of Fame in Las Vegas.

In 1991, Lacy received the Lifetime Achievement Award from the National Association of Black Journalists.

In 1994, Lacy was selected for the Society of Professional Journalists Hall of Fame by the Washington chapter.

In 1995, Lacy was in the first group of writers to be honored with the A.J. Liebling Award by the Boxing Writers Association of America.

In 1997, the 50th anniversary of Robinson's groundbreaking major league debut, Lacy received an honorary doctorate from Loyola University Maryland, and was honored by the Smithsonian Institution with a lecture series. Lacy also threw out the ceremonial first pitch prior to a Baltimore Orioles home game at Camden Yards that season.

On October 22, 1997, Lacy received the J. G. Taylor Spink Award for outstanding baseball writing from the Baseball Writers' Association of America. The award carries induction to the writers and broadcasters wing of the Baseball Hall of Fame, and Lacy was formally enshrined on July 26, 1998.

In 1998, Lacy received the Frederick Douglass Award from the University System of Maryland on April 23; the United Negro College Fund established a scholarship program in Lacy's name on April 25; and he received the Red Smith Award from the Associated Press on June 26.

In 2003, the Sports Task Force wing of the National Association of Black Journalists instituted the Sam Lacy Pioneer Award, presented annually to multiple sports figures in the host city for the NABJ convention. Recipients are selected based on their "contributions to their respected careers, but more importantly, their direct impact on the communities they served."

Lacy also served on the President's Council on Physical Fitness and on the Baseball Hall of Fame's selection committee for the Negro leagues.
