= Wilmeth Sidat-Singh =

American soldier, basketball player, and football player

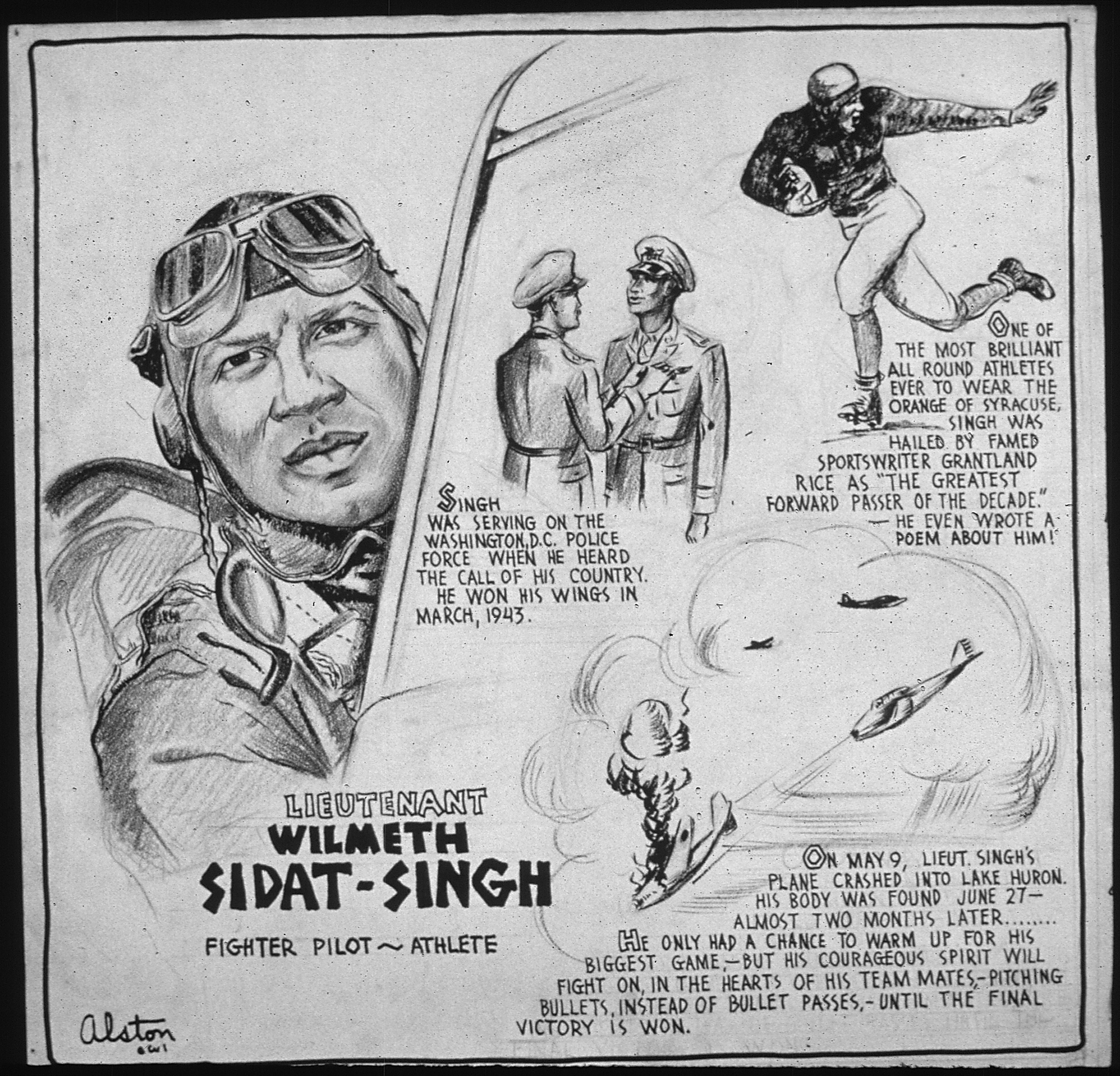
- Poster from Office for Emergency Management, Office of War Information News Bureau, 1943
- Born: February 13, 1918; Washington, D.C., U.S.
- Died: May 9, 1943 (aged 25); Lake Huron
- Military career
- Allegiance: United States
- Branch: United States Army Air Forces; United States Air Force
- Service years: 1943
- Nickname: The Syracuse Walking Dream

Wilmeth Sidat-Singh (born William Webb; February 13, 1918 – May 9, 1943) was a U.S. Army Air Corps officer with the Tuskegee Airmen, and an American basketball and football player who was subject to segregation in college and professional sports in the 1930s.

== Early life ==
His parents were both African-American. After the death of his father, Elias Webb (a pharmacist), his mother, Pauline, married Samuel Sidat-Singh, a medical student from India who adopted Wilmeth, giving him his family name. After his graduation from Howard University, Dr. Sidat-Singh moved the family to Harlem and set up a family medical practice. Wilmeth showed great talent as an athlete and became a basketball star, leading DeWitt Clinton High School to the New York Public High School Athletic League championship in 1934.

== Basketball, Football, Law Enforcement Career ==
Sidat-Singh received an offer of a basketball scholarship from Syracuse University and enrolled in 1935. Former lacrosse coach Roy Simmons Sr. saw him playing an intramural football game and asked him to join the football team. Sidat-Singh starred for Syracuse, playing a position equivalent to modern-day quarterback and starring for the basketball team as well.

Syracuse University and nearby Cornell University were among the first collegiate football teams to include African-American players as starting backfield players. A 1938 news report in the Baltimore Sun reports on one such game where Sidat-Singh led Syracuse to victory over Cornell. In that era, when games were played in Southern segregation states, African-American players from Northern schools were banned from the field. Because of his light complexion and name, Sidat-Singh was sometimes assumed to be a "Hindu" (as people from India were often called by Americans during this time). However. shortly before a game against the University of Maryland, a black sportswriter, Sam Lacy, wrote an article in the Baltimore Afro-American, revealing Sidat-Singh's true racial identity. Wilmeth Sidat-Singh was held out of the game and Syracuse lost that game 0-13. In a rematch the following year at Syracuse, Sidat-Singh led the Orange to a lopsided victory (53-0) over Maryland.

With unofficial bans on black players enacted in both the National Basketball League (NBL) and National Football League (NFL) Sidat-Singh played briefly for a professional barnstorming basketball team in Syracuse and then joined the Metropolitan Police Department of the District of Columbia. One of the teams Sidat-Singh played for during this time, the Rochester Seagrams, actually still exists to this present day as the Sacramento Kings in the National Basketball Association. Two other teams that he played for before Sidat-Singh and the U.S.A. entered World War II, the New York Renaissance and the Washington Bears, would both contain storied historied throughout their existences, with the Bears notably being a team that Sidat-Singh was originally on for their 1942–43 season (which notably had them only lose one game played that season) before being called up for service on March 1943, sometime before the Bears were set to compete in the 1943 World Professional Basketball Tournament (which they ultimately won that year as the last independent team to win that event).

== Military Career, Tuskegee Airmen, Death ==
After U.S. entry into World War II, he applied and was accepted as a member of the Tuskegee Airmen, the only African-American unit in the U.S. Army Air Force, and won his wings as a pilot.

Sidat-Singh died in 1943 during a training mission when the engine of his airplane failed. "He died on a training flight when his stricken plane went down in Saginaw Bay, his parachute tangled in the fuselage." He drowned in Lake Huron.

== Legacy ==
In 2005, Syracuse University honored Wilmeth Sidat-Singh by retiring his number and hanging his basketball jersey (#19) in the rafters of the Carrier Dome.

On Saturday, Nov. 9, 2013, the University of Maryland publicly apologized to surviving relatives from the Webb family at a ceremony during a football game with Syracuse University.

== Family ==
Two of Sidat-Singh's paternal aunts, educators Helen Webb Harris and Ethel Webb Terrell, were founding members of the Wake-Robin Golf Club, the oldest registered African American women's golf club in the United States, in 1937.

== Fraternity Membership ==
Wilmeth Sidat-Singh was a member of Omega Psi Phi fraternity initiated into Kappa chapter on May 2, 1938. The original initiation document has a poem written about Sidat.

== See also ==
- Dogfights (TV series)
- Executive Order 9981
- Freeman Field Mutiny
- List of Tuskegee Airmen
- Military history of African Americans
- The Tuskegee Airmen (movie)
- Tuskegee Airmen
