= William Ashe =

William Ashe may refer to:

- William Shepperd Ashe (1814–1862), U.S. Representative from North Carolina
- William Willard Ashe (1872–1932), American forester and botanist
- William Ashe (1647–1713), MP for Heytesbury
- William Ashe (1715–1750), MP for Heytesbury
- William Ashe (Michigan politician) in United States House of Representatives elections, 2000
- William Ashe (b. 1675), MP for Heytesbury
- William Ashe (d. 1750), see William Ashe-à Court

== See also ==
- William Ash (disambiguation)
