= Al Price =

American basketball player (1917–2011)

Personal information
- Born: September 8, 1917 Detroit, Michigan, U.S.
- Died: November 7, 2011 (aged 94) Toledo, Ohio, U.S.
- Listed height: 6 ft 0 in (1.83 m)
- Listed weight: 180 lb (82 kg)

Career information
- High school: Waite (Toledo, Ohio)
- Playing career: 1941–1946
- Position: Guard

Career history
- 1941–1942: Harlem Globetrotters
- 1942: Toledo Jim White Chevrolets
- 1943–1947: Harlem Globetrotters
- 1945–1946: Kansas City Stars

Albert W. Price Sr. (September 8, 1917 – November 7, 2011) was an American professional basketball player. He played for the Harlem Globetrotters for five years. He also played for the Toledo Jim White Chevrolets in the National Basketball League during the 1942–43 season and averaged 2.7 points per game.

His older brother, Bernie Price, also played for the Globetrotters and in the NBL.
