= Bob Schwartz (basketball) =

American basketball player

Personal information
- Born: January 14, 1919 Madison, Wisconsin, U.S.
- Died: June 3, 1995 (aged 76) Tucson, Arizona, U.S.
- Listed height: 6 ft 3 in (1.91 m)
- Listed weight: 175 lb (79 kg)

Career information
- High school: Madison West (Madison, Wisconsin)
- College: Wisconsin (1937–1940)
- Position: Forward

Career highlights
- NBL champion (1943)

Robert Edward Schwartz (January 14, 1919 – June 3, 1995) was an American professional basketball player. He played for the Sheboygan Red Skins in the National Basketball League in 1942–43 and averaged 5.6 points per game. He won an NBL championship with the Red Skins in his only season with the team.
