= Zano Wast =

American basketball player

Personal information
- Born: August 20, 1916 Moline, Illinois, U.S.
- Died: May 21, 1988 (aged 71) Toledo, Ohio, U.S.
- Listed height: 6 ft 2 in (1.88 m)
- Listed weight: 175 lb (79 kg)

Career information
- College: Toledo (1939–1940)
- Playing career: 1934–1942
- Position: Forward

Career history
- 1934–1936: Akron Olympics
- 1936–1937: Akron Castings
- 1936–1937: Akron Rohmers
- 1937–1938: Akron Favorite Knits
- 1937–1938: Akron Goodrich Tires
- 1938–1939: Akron
- 1939–1940: Toledo St.Peter's
- 1940–1941: Toledo DeLuxe Inn
- 1941–1942: Toledo
- 1942: Toledo Jim White Chevrolets

Zano Stanley Wast (August 20, 1916 – May 21, 1988) was an American professional basketball player. He played for the Toledo Jim White Chevrolets in the National Basketball League for one total game and did not register a statistic. Wast also played for a number of Amateur Athletic Union and independent league teams.
