= Cortez Gray =

American basketball player

Personal information
- Born: March 7, 1916 Hanceville, Alabama, U.S.
- Died: July 28, 1996 (aged 80) Phoenix, Arizona, U.S.
- Listed height: 6 ft 5 in (1.96 m)
- Listed weight: 185 lb (84 kg)

Career information
- High school: South (Akron, Ohio)
- College: Toledo (1939–1942)
- Position: Power forward / center

Career history
- 1941–1942: Midland AC
- 1942: Toledo Jim White Chevrolets

Cortez Zell Gray (March 7, 1916 – July 28, 1996) was an American professional basketball player. He played for the Toledo Jim White Chevrolets in the National Basketball League for four games during the first half of the 1942–43 season and averaged 4.5 points per game. He was the brother of Wyndol Gray, another professional basketball player.
