= Lou Barle =

American basketball and football player (1916–1996)

Personal information
- Born: June 23, 1916 Gilbert, Minnesota, U.S.
- Died: December 30, 1996 (aged 80) Duluth, Minnesota, U.S.
- Listed height: 6 ft 1 in (1.85 m)
- Listed weight: 200 lb (91 kg)

Career information
- High school: Eveleth-Gilbert (Eveleth, Minnesota)
- College: Minnesota–Duluth (1935–1938)
- Position: Forward

Career history
- 1939–1943: Oshkosh All-Stars

Career highlights
- 2× NBL champion (1941, 1942); Minnesota–Duluth Hall of Fame (1991)

Louis Peter "Fats" Barle (June 23, 1916 – December 30, 1996) was an American professional basketball and football player.

== Professional careers ==
=== Football ===
Barle had a brief career in the National Football League. He only appeared in four total games: one in 1938 for the Detroit Lions, and three in 1939 for the Cleveland Rams. He played the halfback position and scored two career touchdowns.

=== Basketball ===
After his professional football career ended, Barle played for the Oshkosh All-Stars in the National Basketball League from 1939–40 to 1942–43 and averaged 5.0 points per game. A forward, he was a two-time NBL champion, in 1941 and 1942.
