= Pat Hintz =

American basketball player

Personal information
- Born: February 4, 1914 Massillon, Ohio
- Died: February 22, 2004 (aged 90) Ann Arbor, Michigan
- Listed height: 6 ft 0 in (1.83 m)
- Listed weight: 175 lb (79 kg)

Career information
- High school: Washington (Massillon, Ohio)
- College: Toledo (1937–1940)
- Position: Guard

Career history
- 1941–1942: Toledo Jim White Chevrolets

Harold Joseph "Pat" Hintz (February 4, 1914 – February 22, 2004) was an American professional basketball player. He played in the National Basketball League for the Toledo Jim White Chevrolets for both seasons the franchise existed and averaged 8.0 points per game for his career.
