= Erwin Graf =

American basketball player

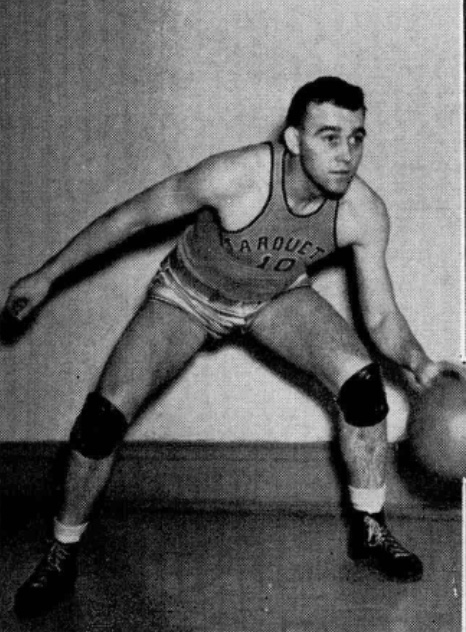
- Graf from the 1939 Hilltop

Personal information
- Born: July 28, 1917
- Died: October 12, 2005 (aged 88)

Career information
- High school: Elgin (Elgin, Illinois)
- College: Marquette (1936–1939)
- Position: Forward / center

Career history

Playing
- 1939, 1942–1943: Sheboygan Red Skins

Coaching
- 1939–1940: Marquette (assistant)
- 1942–1943: Sheboygan Red Skins

Career highlights
- Second-team All-American – MSG (1939)

Erwin Frederick Graf Jr. (July 28, 1917 – October 12, 2005) was an American basketball player who played two seasons in the National Basketball League (NBL) of the United States. Graf, from Elgin, Illinois, played college basketball for the Marquette Golden Eagles and for the Sheboygan Red Skins of the NBL. In two seasons with the Red Skins, Graf averaged 2.2 points over 6 NBL games. He also coached for the Sheboygan Red Skins during their 1942–1943 season before a losing record in early January led to him being waived as a player and replaced as a head coach by former Sheboygan Red Skins player turned team manager Carl Roth that subsequently saw Sheboygan later winning their only NBL championship throughout that league's existence sometime afterward. He was also known by the nicknames "Moose" and "Ike."
