= Bud Engdahl =

American basketball player

Personal information
- Born: July 1, 1918 Superior, Wisconsin, U.S.
- Died: May 11, 1985 (aged 66) McGregor, Minnesota, U.S.
- Listed height: 6 ft 1 in (1.85 m)
- Listed weight: 210 lb (95 kg)

Career information
- High school: Superior Central (Superior, Wisconsin)
- College: Wisconsin–Superior (1939–1941)
- Position: Guard

Career history
- 1941–1943, 1945–1946: Oshkosh All-Stars

Career highlights
- NBL champion (1942)

Warner Walmar "Bud" Engdahl (July 1, 1918 – May 11, 1985) was an American professional basketball player. He played for the Oshkosh All-Stars in the National Basketball League during the 1941–42, 1942–43, and 1945–46 seasons. He won an NBL championship in 1941–42. For his career, Engdahl averaged 1.7 points per game.
