= Carl Roth (basketball) =

American basketball player and coach

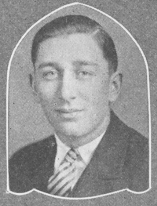
- Roth pictured in the 1927 Sheboygan High School Yearbook

Personal information
- Born: September 15, 1909 Sheboygan, Wisconsin, U.S.
- Died: May 28, 1966 (aged 56) Peoria, Illinois, U.S.
- Listed height: 6 ft 2 in (1.88 m)
- Listed weight: 200 lb (91 kg)

Career information
- High school: Sheboygan (Sheboygan, Wisconsin)
- College: Wisconsin (1929–1932)
- Position: Shooting guard / small forward

Career history

Playing
- 1938–1939: Sheboygan Red Skins

Coaching
- 1943–1944: Sheboygan Red Skins

Career highlights
- As coach: NBL champion (1943); NBL Coach of the Year (1943)

Carl William Roth (September 15, 1909 – May 28, 1966) was an American basketball player and coach. A native of Sheboygan, Wisconsin, Roth attended the University of Wisconsin–Madison and played for their men's basketball team from 1929 to 1932. Six years later he played in 14 total games for the Sheboygan Red Skins during the 1938–39 season. The Red Skins were a professional franchise that competed in the National Basketball League (NBL).

Roth stayed with the team as both its legal counsel and in other capacities after his one-season playing. He later took over as head coach in 1943 as the replacement head coach for player-coach Erwin Graf in January 1943 and coached the team for one and a half seasons. In his first season where he took over as head coach for part of that season, the Red Skins won the league championship for the first and only time in their history, with Roth also being named the NBL Coach of the Year as well. He died after a short illness in 1966 at a Peoria, Illinois hospital.
