= 1943 World Professional Basketball Tournament =

World Professional Basketball Tournament
- 1943

Tournament information
- Location: Chicago, Illinois
- Dates: 15 March–18 March
- Venue: International Amphitheater
- Teams: 12

Final positions
- Champions: Washington Bears
- 1st runner-up: Oshkosh All-Stars
- 2nd runner-up: Fort Wayne Zollner Pistons
- MVP: Curly Armstrong

The 1943 World Professional Basketball Tournament was the fifth edition of the World Professional Basketball Tournament. It was held in Chicago, Illinois, during the days of 15–18 March 1943 and featured 12 teams, with the teams mostly being independently run teams that also competed alongside the four remaining teams that were from the National Basketball League at the time because of World War II. However, the Chicago Studebaker Flyers would move to South Bend, Indiana after they were eliminated from the 1943 NBL Playoffs and rebranded themselves to the South Bend Studebaker Champions, with them having the same roster there outside of the last minute addition of former Chicago Collegians and Harlem Globetrotters player Agis Bray.) The Fort Wayne Zollner Pistons got their revenge on the NBL champion Sheboygan Red Skins by winning 48–40 over them in the quarterfinal match, but were upset by the Oshkosh All-Stars in the semifinals by a close 40–39 win by Oshkosh. Meanwhile, the other finalist team, the Washington Bears, were an all-black team that was composed of New York Renaissance players that lost only one time in the over 50 games they played in during the independent season they had under that name. One player that was originally on the Bears' roster earlier in the season, Wilmeth Sidat-Singh, had left the team to enlist in the all-black Tuskegee Airmen fighter squadron, but tragically died in a plane crash during World War II months after the tournament concluded on May 9, 1943 (though his body wasn't found until over a month passed on June 27), at the young age of 25. This year's event was won by the Washington Bears, which included many former New York Renaissance players and coincidentally was the final year that an independent team would win the WPBT, who defeated the Oshkosh All-Stars 43–31 in the championship game. The Fort Wayne Zollner Pistons came in third after beating the Dayton Dive Bombers 58–52 in the third-place game. Despite his team not even making it to the championship match, Curly Armstrong of the Fort Wayne Zollner Pistons was named the tournament's Most Valuable Player.

== Results ==
=== Bracket ===
Round 1
Minneapolis Sparklers | 45
South Bend Studebaker Champions | 44
Dayton Dive Bombers | 46
Chicago Ramblers | 41
Fort Wayne Zollner Pistons | 57
Indianapolis Pure Oils | 52
Detroit Eagles | 33
Akron Collegians | 31

Quarterfinals
Washington Bears | 48
Minneapolis Sparklers | 21
Dayton Dive Bombers | 44
Harlem Globetrotters | 34
Fort Wayne Zollner Pistons | 48
Sheboygan Red Skins | 40
Detroit Eagles | 36
Oshkosh All-Stars | 65

Semifinals
Washington Bears | 38
Dayton Dive Bombers | 30
Fort Wayne Zollner Pistons | 39
Oshkosh All-Stars | 40

Final
Washington Bears | 43
Oshkosh All-Stars | 31
Third place
Dayton Dive Bombers | 52
Fort Wayne Zollner Pistons | 58

=== Third place game ===
17 March 1943

Fort Wayne Zollner Pistons 58, Dayton Dive Bombers 52

Chicago Stadium
Attendance: 11,000

=== Championship game ===
17 March 1943
9:30 p.m.

Boxscore

Washington Bears 43, Oshkosh All-Stars 31
Scoring by half: 27–15, 16–16
| Pts: J. Isaacs – 11 | Pts: R. Vaughn, L. Edwards – 6 |

Chicago Stadium
Attendance: 11,000
Referees: Pat Kennedy, Dutch Kriznicky

== Individual awards ==
- Bobby McDermott of the Fort Wayne Zollner Pistons led this tournament in scoring with 50 points scored in four games played.

=== All-Tournament First Team ===
- F - Pop Gates, Washington Bears
- F - Curly Armstrong, Fort Wayne Zollner Pistons (MVP)
- C - Dolly King, Washington Bears
- G - Charley Shipp, Oshkosh All-Stars
- G - Buddy Jeannette, Sheboygan Red Skins

=== All-Tournament Second Team ===
- F - Ralph Vaughn, Oshkosh All-Stars
- F - Johnny Isaacs, Washington Bears
- C - Hal Tidrick, Dayton Dive Bombers
- G - Bobby McDermott, Fort Wayne Zollner Pistons
- G - Zack Clayton, Washington Bears

== See also ==
- 1942–43 National Basketball League (United States) season, a professional basketball season featuring all four surviving teams there (though with one team rebranding itself for this event)
