= Warren Schrage =

American basketball player

Personal information
- Born: July 30, 1920 Plymouth, Wisconsin, U.S.
- Died: January 19, 1999 (aged 78) Dallas, Texas, U.S.
- Listed height: 6 ft 5 in (1.96 m)
- Listed weight: 190 lb (86 kg)

Career information
- High school: Plymouth (Plymouth, Wisconsin)
- College: Wisconsin (1940–1942)
- Position: Power forward / center

Career history
- 1942–1943: Sheboygan Red Skins

Career highlights
- NBL champion (1943); NCAA champion (1941)

Warren Alfred Schrage (July 30, 1920 – January 19, 1999) was an American professional basketball player. He played for the Sheboygan Red Skins in the National Basketball League in 1942–43 and averaged 0.2 points per game.

Schrage won national championships in both college (Wisconsin, 1941) and professionally (Sheboygan Red Skins, 1943).
