= Gene Lorendo =

American football and basketball coach (1921–2001)

Biographical details
- Born: December 7, 1921; Gilbert, Minnesota, U.S.
- Died: April 15, 2001 (aged 79); Alpharetta, Georgia, U.S.

Playing career

Football
- 1947–1949: Georgia

Basketball
- 1942–1943: Oshkosh All-Stars
- 1946–1949: Georgia
- Positions: End (football); Forward (basketball)

Coaching career (HC unless noted)

Football
- 1950: Presbyterian (assistant)
- 1951–1975: Auburn (assistant)

Basketball
- 1950–1951: Presbyterian

Head coaching record
- Overall: 17–9 (basketball)

Accomplishments and honors

Championships
- Basketball: SCLF regular season (1951); SCLF Tournament (1951)

Eugene Lionel Lorendo (December 7, 1921 – April 15, 2001) was an American college football and basketball coach, as well as a professional basketball player for one season. He played in the National Basketball League for the Oshkosh All-Stars in 1942–43, served as Presbyterian College's head men's basketball coach in 1950–51, but is perhaps most remembered for his twenty-five seasons spent as an assistant football coach for Auburn University between 1951 and 1975.

== Early life and playing careers ==
A native of Gilbert, Minnesota, Lorendo attended Gilbert High School and lettered in football, basketball, and track. At 6'3" and 215 pounds, and of French-Canadian descent, Lorendo was a large man who was later written about resembling a viking. Utilizing this stature helped him play football, basketball, and track when he attended college.

Some sources claim that Lorendo played football and basketball at Evelith Junior College (c. 1940), the University of Northern Iowa (c. 1942), and the University of Georgia (1946–1949). The only verifiable statistics and records, however, can trace him to his time at Georgia.

Before Lorendo attended Georgia, he played one season of professional basketball for the Oshkosh All-Stars in the National Basketball League during 1942–43. A forward, he averaged 1.9 points per game. Lorendo then served in the Coast Guard in World War II; stops during his service included Pearl Harbor, Iwo Jima, and Okinawa.

When Lorendo enrolled at the University of Georgia in fall 1946, he joined the football, basketball, and track teams. In football he played wide receiver, where in 1949 he led the Southeastern Conference in receiving. He also appeared in three bowl games: the 1947 Sugar Bowl, 1948 Gator Bowl, and 1949 Orange Bowl.

In spring 1950, he was chosen in the 1950 NFL draft by the Green Bay Packers (11th round, 134th overall) but never played a game in the league.

== Coaching careers ==
=== Football ===
Once Lorendo's playing days were over, he accepted Presbyterian College's offer to coach football and basketball, starting in the 1950–51 academic year. He served as an assistant coach for the football team who finished with a 5–5 record in 1950.

In March 1951, he received a phone call from Ralph "Shug" Jordan, Auburn University's newly appointed head football coach. Jordan had been an assistant football coach and the head basketball coach at Georgia while Lorendo was attending as a student-athlete, and wanted Lorendo to join him on Auburn's football staff. Lorendo accepted, and he, his wife, and their newborn son relocated to Auburn, Alabama. Lorendo spent the next twenty-five seasons serving in various assistant coaching roles (1951–1975), and he earned a reputation as being tough yet fair. His coaching method was described as "old school" and he would punish players who he felt were not giving 100% effort in practice or games. Lorendo was later quoted as telling his players, "If I've been yelling and cussing at you in past seasons, it is only because you had a chance to help the team."

Lorendo's notable accomplishments as Auburn's assistant coach include coaching the wide receivers during the 1957 national championship year, as well as recruiting and coaching Pat Sullivan, an All-American and Heisman Trophy winner in 1971.

=== Basketball ===
In Lorendo's only year at Presbyterian, he served as the men's basketball team's head coach. They finished with a 17–9 overall record and won both the South Carolina Little Four regular season and conference tournament titles.

The Minnesota State High School Coaches Association website also lists Lorendo as having coached Northome-Kelliher High School for one season, compiling a 6–16 overall record, but it does not state the specific season in which this occurred.

Record table
Season	Team	Overall	Conference	Standing	Postseason
Presbyterian Blue Hose (South Carolina Little Four) (1950–1951)
1950–51	Presbyterian	17–9	5–1	1st	
Presbyterian:		17–9	5–1		
Total:		17–9			
National champion Postseason invitational champion Conference regular season champion Conference regular season and conference tournament champion Division regular season champion Division regular season and conference tournament champion Conference tournament champion

== Legacy ==
Gene Lorendo's life was chronicled in a biography, Lorendo, written by sportswriter Kenneth Ringer (2015). He died on April 15, 2001, in Alpharetta, Georgia.
