= Shannie Barnett =

American basketball player

Personal information
- Born: February 8, 1919 Pine Bluff, Arkansas
- Died: July 2, 1991 (aged 72) Toledo, Ohio
- Listed height: 6 ft 3 in (1.91 m)
- Listed weight: 175 lb (79 kg)
- Position: Forward / center

Career history
- 1942: Toledo Jim White Chevrolets
- 1949–1950: New York Comedy Kings

Shannie Sloan Barnett (February 8, 1919 – July 2, 1991) was an American professional basketball player. He played for the Toledo Jim White Chevrolets in the National Basketball League during the 1942–43 season and averaged 3.5 points per game, additionally he also played in New York Comedy Kings as Independent
