= Ray Krzoska =

American basketball player (1918–2006)

Personal information
- Born: October 28, 1918 Jennings, Wisconsin, U.S.
- Died: April 5, 2006 (aged 87) Whitefish Bay, Wisconsin, U.S.
- Listed height: 6 ft 2 in (1.88 m)
- Listed weight: 190 lb (86 kg)

Career information
- High school: East (Milwaukee, Wisconsin)
- College: University of Wisconsin–Milwaukee (1940–1941, 1946–1948)
- Position: Guard
- Coaching career: 1945–1970

Career history

Playing
- 1943: Oshkosh All-Stars
- 1944–1945: Chicago American Gears
- 1946–1949: Milwaukee Shooting Stars

Coaching
- 1945–1947: Cathedral HS
- 1948–1950: Wisconsin–Whitewater
- 1963–1970: Milwaukee

Raymond Richard Krzoska (October 28, 1918 – April 5, 2006) was an American professional basketball player. He played for the Oshkosh All-Stars and Chicago American Gears in the National Basketball League averaged 3.8 points per game. Krzoska was also a high school and college head coach, notably at Wisconsin–Whitewater (1948–1950) and Milwaukee (1963–1970), his alma mater.

He received a graduate degree from Marquette University. Krzoska died from Alzheimer's disease in 2006.
