= Bill Komenich =

American basketball player (1916–1961)

Personal information
- Born: July 1, 1916 Gary, Indiana, U.S.
- Died: March 8, 1961 (aged 44) Gary, Indiana, U.S.
- Listed height: 6 ft 3 in (1.91 m)
- Listed weight: 210 lb (95 kg)

Career information
- College: Marquette (1938–1941)
- Position: Guard / forward

Career history
- 1941–1943, 1944–1945: Oshkosh All-Stars

Career highlights
- NBL champion (1942)

William Komenich (July 1, 1916 – March 8, 1961) was an American professional basketball player. He played for the Oshkosh All-Stars in the National Basketball League for three seasons and averaged 2.9 points per game. He won the NBL championship in 1941–42.

Bill's brother was Milo Komenich, who also played in the NBL.
