= Bob Alwin =

American basketball player

Personal information
- Born: August 12, 1920 Madison, Wisconsin, U.S.
- Died: October 8, 2003 (aged 83) Clearwater, Florida, U.S.
- Listed height: 5 ft 10 in (1.78 m)
- Listed weight: 145 lb (66 kg)

Career information
- High school: Madison East (Madison, Wisconsin)
- College: Wisconsin (1939–1942)
- Position: Guard

Career history

Playing
- 1942: Oshkosh All-Stars

Coaching
- 1946–1957: Madison Central HS

Career highlights
- NCAA champion (1941)

Robert Harry Alwin (August 12, 1920 – October 8, 2003) was an American professional basketball player.

== Professional career ==
He played for the Oshkosh All-Stars in the National Basketball League for four games during the 1942–43 season and averaged 5.3 points per game.
