= Bob Kramer (basketball) =

American basketball player

Personal information
- Born: April 23, 1922 Hammond, Indiana, U.S.
- Died: September 24, 1978 (aged 56) Hammond, Indiana, U.S.
- Listed height: 6 ft 3 in (1.91 m)

Career information
- High school: Hammond Tech (Hammond, Indiana)
- Position: Guard / forward

Career history
- 1941–1942: Northern Indiana
- 1942–1943, 1946–1947: Oshkosh All-Stars
- 1946–1947: Youngstown Bears
- 19??–19??: Gary Ingots

Robert Henry Kramer (April 23, 1922 – September 24, 1978) was an American professional basketball player. He played for the Oshkosh All-Stars and the Youngstown Bears in the National Basketball League and averaged 2.3 points per game.
