= Tommy Nisbet =

American basketball player (1916–1963)

Personal information
- Born: May 31, 1916 Galston, Scotland
- Died: April 7, 1963 (aged 46) Evanston, Illinois, U.S.
- Listed height: 5 ft 10 in (1.78 m)
- Listed weight: 165 lb (75 kg)

Career information
- High school: Thornton (Harvey, Illinois)
- College: Illinois (1931–1934)
- Position: Guard

Career history

Playing
- 1938–1940: Hammond Ciesar All-Americans
- 1940–1943: Oshkosh All-Stars
- 1943: Rochester

Coaching
- 1946–1957: Thornton HS
- 1957–1963: New Trier HS

Career highlights
- 2× NBL champion (1941, 1942)

Thomas Nisbet (March 31, 1916 – April 7, 1963) was an American professional basketball player. He played in the National Basketball League for the Hammond Ciesar All-Americans and Oshkosh All-Stars. While playing for Oshkosh he won two league championships, in 1940–41 and 1941–42. For his NBL career, Nisbet averaged 3.1 points per game.
