= Bill Ash (basketball) =

American basketball player

Career history
- 1944: Chicago American Gears

William Ash was an American professional basketball player. He played for the Chicago American Gears in the National Basketball League for two games in the 1944–45 season and averaged 5.0 points per game.
