= Ken Buehler =

American basketball player (1919–2019)

Personal information
- Born: November 19, 1919 Edgar, Wisconsin, U.S.
- Died: April 18, 2019 (aged 99) Rhinelander, Wisconsin, U.S.
- Listed height: 6 ft 2 in (1.88 m)
- Listed weight: 185 lb (84 kg)

Career information
- High school: Edgar (Edgar, Wisconsin)
- College: Milwaukee (1939–1942)
- Playing career: 1942–1946
- Position: Forward / center

Career history
- 1942–1943, 1946: Sheboygan Red Skins
- 1946: Fort Wayne Zollner Pistons

Career highlights
- NBL Rookie of the Year (1943); Univ. of Wisconsin–Milwaukee Hall of Fame (1974)

Kenneth Leslie Buehler (November 19, 1919 – April 18, 2019) was an American professional basketball player for the Sheboygan Red Skins and the Fort Wayne Zollner Pistons. He played in two seasons for the Red Skins and, after serving in the United States Navy in World War II, Buehler returned to professional basketball and played in eight games for the Pistons. During the 1942–43 season, the Red Skins won the National Basketball League (NBL) championship with Buehler as their third-leading scorer. He averaged 7.5 points per game and was also named that season's NBL Rookie of the Year.

Upon returning from the war, Buehler played for Sheboygan in three games late in the 1945–46 season. The following season, he played in only eight games for Fort Wayne before retiring from professional basketball due to a knee problem. He then attended Marquette University's dental school and became a dentist in his post-basketball career.

Buehler died in April 2019 at the age of 99 in Rhinelander, Wisconsin.
