= Bill Jones (basketball, born 1914) =

American basketball player

Personal information
- Born: February 3, 1914 Toledo, Ohio, U.S.
- Died: April 9, 2006 (aged 92) Los Angeles, California, U.S.

Career information
- High school: Woodward (Toledo, Ohio); Libbey (Toledo, Ohio)
- College: Toledo (1933–1934; 1936–1938)
- Position: Guard

Career history
- 1942: Toledo Jim White Chevrolets

William McNeil Jones (February 3, 1914 – April 9, 2006), known professionally as Bill Jones, was an American professional basketball player. He played in all four games for the National Basketball League's Toledo Jim White Chevrolets before the team disbanded early into the 1942–43 season. Jones was one of the earliest African-American players in the NBL and is considered a pioneer of integration in professional basketball.

He played collegiately at the University of Toledo, followed by stints with barnstorming teams as well as the Harlem Globetrotters. He eventually moved to Los Angeles, California.
