= Fred Nimz =

American basketball player

Personal information
- Born: April 22, 1914 Wausau, Wisconsin, U.S.
- Died: May 9, 1992 (aged 78) Fond du Lac, Wisconsin, U.S.
- Listed height: 6 ft 3 in (1.91 m)
- Listed weight: 200 lb (91 kg)

Career information
- High school: Wausau (Wausau, Wisconsin)
- College: Wisconsin–Stevens Point (1936–1939)
- Playing career: 1938–1949
- Position: Power forward / center

Career history
- 1938: Dorchester Aces
- 1938–1939: Sheboygan Red Skins
- 1939–1940: Oshkosh All-Stars
- 1940–1941: Oshkosh Chris Crafts
- 1941–1942: Sheboygan Red Skins
- 1942: Oshkosh All-Stars
- 1944–1945: Baltimore Bullets
- 1947–1949: New Holstein

Fred Otto Nimz (April 22, 1914 – May 9, 1992) was an American professional basketball player. He played for the Sheboygan Red Skins and the Oshkosh All-Stars in the National Basketball League and the Baltimore Bullets in the American Basketball League. He also competed for various independent league teams.
