= Jack Keller (basketball) =

American basketball player

Personal information
- Born: June 22, 1922 Fort Wayne, Indiana
- Died: May 2, 2012 (aged 89) Fort Wayne, Indiana
- Listed height: 6 ft 2 in (1.88 m)
- Listed weight: 185 lb (84 kg)

Career information
- High school: North Side (Fort Wayne, Indiana)
- Position: Guard / forward

Career history
- 1941–1943: Fort Wayne Zollner Pistons

Jack Gatton Keller (June 22, 1922 – May 2, 2012) was an American professional basketball player. He played for the Fort Wayne Zollner Pistons in the National Basketball League for two seasons and averaged 2.0 points per game.
