= Eddie Sadowski =

American basketball and football player (1915–1992)

Personal information
- Born: February 2, 1915 Westfield, Massachusetts, U.S.
- Died: March 11, 1992 (aged 77) Springfield, Massachusetts, U.S.
- Listed height: 5 ft 10 in (1.78 m)
- Listed weight: 175 lb (79 kg)

Career information
- College: Notre Dame (1936–1939)
- Playing career: 1939–1946
- Position: Guard

Career history
- 1939–1940, 1941–1942: Indianapolis Kautskys
- 1942: Toledo Jim White Chevrolets
- 1942–1943: Sheboygan Red Skins
- 1943–1947: Indianapolis Pure Oils
- 1945–1946: Indianapolis Kautskys

Career highlights
- NBL champion (1943)

Edward Marion Sadowski (February 2, 1915 – March 11, 1992) was an American professional basketball player. He played for the Indianapolis Kautskys, Toledo Jim White Chevrolets, and Sheboygan Red Skins in the National Basketball League (NBL) and averaged 4.8 points per game. In 1942–43 he won the NBL championship while playing for the Red Skins.

Sadowski was born in Massachusetts and played basketball and football for the University of Notre Dame. He is often confused with Ed Sadowski, who also played in the NBL (although they are unrelated). The latter Sadowski played collegiately at Seton Hall University, as well as won the NBL Rookie of the Year Award in 1941 during the same season the former Sadowski didn't play in the NBL due to the Indianapolis Kautskys deciding to opt out of the NBL that season for the purpose of experimenting as a barnstorming team.
