= George Nelmark =

American basketball player (1917–2010)

Personal information
- Born: May 9, 1917 Ironwood, Michigan, U.S.
- Died: December 4, 2010 (aged 93) Santa Barbara, California, U.S.
- Listed height: 6 ft 1 in (1.85 m)
- Listed weight: 180 lb (82 kg)

Career information
- College: Truman (1938–1941)
- Playing career: 1941–1951
- Position: Guard

Career history

Playing
- 1941: Oshkosh All-Stars
- 1941–1942: Toledo Jim White Chevrolets
- 1946: St. Louis Blues
- 1946–1948: Syracuse Nationals
- 1948–1949: Fibber McGee & Molly
- 1949: Santa Barbara Retreaders
- 1949–1950: Santa Maria Dukes
- 1950–1951: Santa Barbara All-Americans

Coaching
- 1951–1990: Antelope Valley HS

Career highlights
- First-team all-MIAA (1939)

George Gregory Nelmark (May 9, 1917 – December 4, 2010), born George Nelimarkka, was an American professional basketball player. He played in the National Basketball League for the Toledo Jim White Chevrolets (1941–42) and Syracuse Nationals (1946–48) and averaged 5.3 points per game for his career.

Nelmark served with the US Marine Corps during World War II, participating in the Battle of Guadalcanal. After the war, he attended UC Santa Barbara, and became a teacher at Antelope Valley High School, Lancaster, CA in 1951, retiring in 1990.
