= Ralph Vaughn =

American basketball player

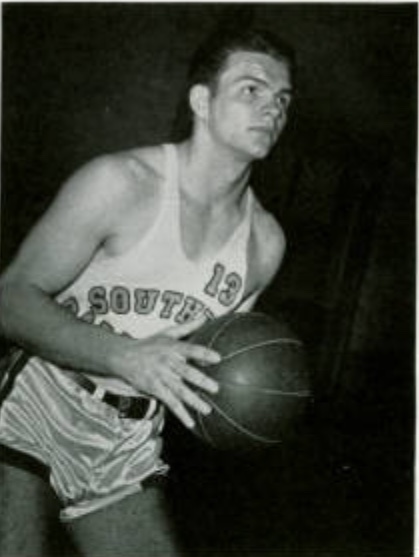
- Vaughn from the 1940 El Rodeo

Personal information
- Born: February 12, 1918
- Died: June 7, 1998 (aged 80)
- Listed height: 6 ft 1 in (1.85 m)
- Listed weight: 175 lb (79 kg)

Career information
- High school: Frankfort (Frankfort, Indiana)
- College: USC (1937–1940)
- Playing career: 1940–1947
- Position: Forward / guard
- Number: 13

Career history
- 1940: Chicago Bruins
- 1940–1941: Hammond Ciesar All-Americans
- 1941–1942: Chicago Bruins
- 1942–1943 1946–1947: Oshkosh All-Stars

Career highlights
- All-NBL First Team (1943); 2× All-NBL Second Team (1941, 1942); Consensus first-team All-American (1940); Second-team All-American – Collyer's News (1939); 2× All-PCC (1939, 1940)

Ralph Lincoln Vaughn (February 12, 1918 – June 8, 1998) was an American basketball player for the Southern California Trojans. He led the Pacific Coast Conference in scoring his senior season of 1939–40 at 15.0 points per game (180 in conference play) in which he was named a Consensus First Team All-American. That season, Vaughn led the Sam Barry–coached team to their first ever NCAA Tournament, losing in the national semifinals. Vaughn once scored 36 points in a single game against UCLA, which was a conference record that stood for 21 years.

At Frankfort High School in Indiana, Vaughn led the North Central Conference in scoring during his junior and senior seasons, winning the state championship as a junior in 1935. He was also dubbed All-State and played for future Hall of Famer Everett Case.

Vaughn appeared on the January 15, 1940 cover of Life magazine. He played in the National Basketball League for several years before getting into business.
