= Charley Shipp =

American basketball player

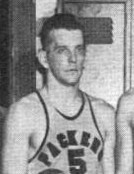
- Shipp, c. 1948

Personal information
- Born: December 3, 1913 Indianapolis, Indiana, U.S.
- Died: March 21, 1988 (aged 74) Lafayette, Indiana, U.S.
- Listed height: 6 ft 1 in (1.85 m)
- Listed weight: 200 lb (91 kg)

Career information
- High school: Cathedral (Indianapolis, Indiana)
- College: Catholic (1934–1936)
- Playing career: 1933–1951
- Position: Guard / forward
- Number: 5

Career history

Playing
- 1933–1934: Indianapolis Pros
- 1934–1936: Hilgemeier Packers
- 1934–1936: Indianapolis U.S. Tires
- 1936–1939: Akron Goodyear Wingfoots
- 1939–1944: Oshkosh All-Stars
- 1944–1946: Fort Wayne Zollner Pistons
- 1946–1948: Anderson Duffey Packers
- 1948–1950: Waterloo Hawks
- 1950–1951: Waterloo Rockets

Coaching
- 1948–1950: Waterloo Hawks

Career highlights
- MBC champion (1937); 4× NBL champion (1938, 1941, 1942, 1945); 5× All-NBL First Team (1938, 1940–1943); 2× All-NBL Second Team (1939, 1944); NBL All-Time Team
- Stats at NBA.com
- Stats at Basketball Reference

Charles William Shipp (December 3, 1913 – March 21, 1988) was an American professional basketball player and coach.

A 6'1" guard-forward, Shipp attended Cathedral High School in Indianapolis, where he led the Irish to the National Catholic Championship in 1933. Shipp played thirteen seasons (1937–1950) in the NBL and NBA as a member of the Akron Wingfoots, Oshkosh All-Stars, Fort Wayne Zollner Pistons, Anderson Packers, and Waterloo Hawks. During the 1949-50 NBA season, he served as a player-coach for the Waterloo Hawks, posting an 8–27 record. He made five All-NBL First Teams (1937–38, 1939–43) and two All-NBL Second Teams (1938–39 and 1943–44).

Shipp and Oshkosh All-Stars star player Leroy Edwards were also the only two players to end up playing in all twelve seasons of the National Basketball League (as well as its two precursor seasons in the Midwest Basketball Conference) before it merged operations with the Basketball Association of America to become the National Basketball Association, with Shipp being able to play in the NBA for the Waterloo Hawks following the merger.

== Career playing statistics ==
Legend
GP	Games played	FGM	Field-goals made
FG%	Field-goal percentage	FTM	Free-throws made
FTA	Free-throws attempted	FT%	Free-throw percentage
APG	Assists per game	PTS	Points
PPG	Points per game	**Bold**	Career high

†	Denotes seasons in which Edwards's team won an NBL championship
*	Led the league
‡	Denotes NBL record

=== NBL ===
==== Regular season ====
Year	Team	GP	FGM	FTM	FTA	FT%	PTS	PPG
1937–38	Akron G. W.	16	38	14			90	5.6
1938–39	Akron G. W.	24	59	24			142	5.9
1939–40	Oshkosh	28*	74	26	59	.441	174	6.2
1940–41†	Oshkosh	22	46	21	38	.553	113	5.1
1941–42†	Oshkosh	24*	70	38	53	**.717**	178	7.4
1942–43	Oshkosh	23	52	36	67	.537	140	6.1
1943–44	Oshkosh	20	57	36			150	**7.5**
1944–45†	Fort Wayne	30*	31	16			78	2.6
1945–46	Fort Wayne	34*	42	14	24	.583	98	2.9
1946–47	Anderson	30	77	47	67	.701	201	6.7
1946–47	Fort Wayne	14	12	11	16	.688	35	2.5
1947–48	Anderson	55	103	**63**	**95**	.663	**269**	4.9
1948–49	Waterloo	**56**	**104**	59	90	.656	267	4.8
Career		376‡	765	405	509	.619	1,935	5.1

==== Playoffs ====
Year	Team	GP	FGM	FTM	FTA	FT%	PTS	PPG
1938	Akron G. W.	5	5	7			17	3.4
1940	Oshkosh	**8***	**13**	**12**			**38**	4.8
1941†	Oshkosh	5	7	6			20	4.0
1942†	Oshkosh	4	5	6			16	4.0
1943	Oshkosh	2	4	2			10	**5.0**
1944	Oshkosh	3	3	7			13	4.3
1945†	Fort Wayne	7	4	5			13	1.9
1946	Fort Wayne	4	0	0	1	.000	0	.0
1948	Anderson	2	2	3	**4**	**.750**	7	3.5
Career		40	43	48	5	.600	134	3.4

=== NBA ===
==== Regular season ====
Year	Team	GP	FG%	FT%	APG	PPG
1949–50	Waterloo	23	.255	.725	2.0	4.7

== Head coaching record ==
Legend
Regular season	G	Games coached	W	Games won	L	Games lost	W–L %	Win–loss %
Playoffs	PG	Playoff games	PW	Playoff wins	PL	Playoff losses	PW–L %	Playoff win–loss %

Team	Year	G	W	L	W–L%	Finish	PG	PW	PL	PW–L%	Result
Waterloo	1949–50	35	8	27	.229	(replaced)	—	—	—	—	—
