= Curly Armstrong =

American basketball player and coach

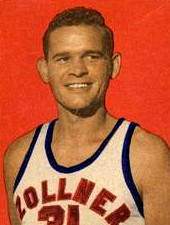
- Armstrong in 1948

Personal information
- Born: November 1, 1918 Fort Wayne, Indiana, U.S.
- Died: June 6, 1983 (aged 64) Fort Wayne, Indiana, U.S.
- Listed height: 5 ft 11 in (1.80 m)
- Listed weight: 170 lb (77 kg)

Career information
- High school: Central (Fort Wayne, Indiana)
- College: Indiana (1938–1941)
- Playing career: 1941–1951
- Position: Forward / guard
- Number: 31, 3

Career history

Playing
- 1941–1943, 1945–1951: Fort Wayne (Zollner) Pistons

Coaching
- 1947: Fort Wayne Zollner Pistons (interim HC)
- 1948–1949: Fort Wayne Pistons
- 1951–1953: Wabash

Career highlights
- All-NBL First Team (1943); NCAA champion (1940); WPBT MVP (1943); All-WPBT First Team (1943)
- Stats at NBA.com
- Stats at Basketball Reference

Paul Carlyle "Curly" Armstrong (November 1, 1918 – June 6, 1983) was an American professional basketball player and coach.

A 5'11" guard/forward, Armstrong starred at Central High School in Fort Wayne, Indiana, where he reached two state championship games while leading his team to a 50–6 record. In the late 1930s and early 1940s, Armstrong attended Indiana University, earning All-Big Ten Conference honors during his junior year. He then played, and briefly coached, for the Fort Wayne Zollner Pistons professional basketball team (today's Detroit Pistons). In 1943, he was named the World Professional Basketball Tournament's Most Valuable Player. He was inducted into the Indiana Basketball Hall of Fame in 1980.

He was head basketball coach at Wabash College in Crawfordsville, Indiana, for two seasons. His record in 1951–52 was 10 wins and 10 losses. His record in 1952–53 was 9 wins and 10 losses.

== Career playing statistics ==
Legend
GP	Games played	FG%	Field-goal percentage
FT%	Free-throw percentage	RPG	Rebounds per game
APG	Assists per game	PPG	Points per game
**Bold**	Career high

=== BAA/NBA ===
==== Regular season ====
Year	Team	GP	FG%	FT%	RPG	APG	PPG
1948–49	Fort Wayne	52	.306	.698	–	2.0	**7.3**
1949–50	Fort Wayne	**63**	.279	**.705**	–	**2.8**	**7.3**
1950–51	Fort Wayne	38	**.310**	.644	**2.3**	2.0	5.3
Career		153	.295	.692	2.3	2.3	6.8

==== Playoffs ====
Year	Team	GP	FG%	FT%	RPG	APG	PPG
1950	Fort Wayne	**3**	.182	.250	–	**2.0**	3.0
1951	Fort Wayne	**3**	**.368**	**1.000**	**2.3**	1.7	**5.0**
Career		6	.268	.400	2.3	1.8	4.0

== Head coaching record ==
Legend
Regular season	G	Games coached	W	Games won	L	Games lost	W–L %	Win–loss %
Playoffs	PG	Playoff games	PW	Playoff wins	PL	Playoff losses	PW–L %	Playoff win–loss %

Team	Year	G	W	L	W–L%	Finish	PG	PW	PL	PW–L%	Result
Fort Wayne	1948–49	54	22	32	.407	5th in Western	—	—	—	—	Missed playoffs
