= 1942–43 Chicago Studebaker Flyers season =

NBL professional basketball team season

- Head coach: John Jordan
- General manager: Danny Serafino
- Owner(s): United Auto Workers Association; Studebaker; Danny Serafino?
- Arena: Cicero Stadium; Chicago Coliseum; DuSable High School (Playoffs)

Results
- Record: 8–15 (.348)
- Place: Division: 4th
- Playoff finish: Lost NBL Semifinals to Fort Wayne Zollner Pistons, 2–1

The 1942–43 Chicago Studebaker Flyers season was the first and only season of the Chicago Studebaker Flyers playing in the United States' National Basketball League (NBL), which would also be the sixth year the NBL itself existed. While the Chicago Studebaker Flyers are officially considered their own team with their own history at hand (however brief it may be as a franchise), they can also be technically considered a continuation of sorts of the old Chicago Bruins franchise that was owned (at the time) by Chicago Bears owner George Halas, who had the right to reactive his Chicago Bruins basketball team whenever he wanted to if he ever felt the need to do so (though he never would do so). As such, if we were to include their previous four seasons of existence in the NBL as the Chicago Bruins alongside the Bruins' original six seasons of existence in the very first rendition of the American Basketball League before it went on a brief hiatus due to the Great Depression (alongside potential play as an independent team in-between those years), then this would be their eleventh (or more (up to their twentieth)) and final season of play as a franchise altogether. Regardless of whether this is or is not a continuation of the Chicago Bruins franchise properly, however, the Chicago Studebaker Flyers under the (new) majority ownership held by the United Auto Workers Association representing the Studebaker company for Chicago, Illinois (probably under Danny Serafino's name) would actually join the short-lived Jim White Chevrolets from November and December 1942 as one of the first teams in the NBL to have a truly integrated team in mind with a mixture of black and white players on the same roster, to the point where they were the first integrated team to not only play this season on November 25, 1942, against the eventual NBL champion Sheboygan Red Skins, but also showcase a starting line-up of African American players (all of them being former players from the world famous Harlem Globetrotters, an all-black team at the time) for a professional game in January 1943 against the Oshkosh All-Stars (with both games ending in losses for Chicago). In order to make sure they did that, they allowed for six players that were originally from the world famous Harlem Globetrotters roster at the time (Sonny Boswell, Hillary Brown, Duke Cumberland, Roosie Hudson, Tony Peyton, and Bernie Price) to join their team since they were already working at the Studebaker plant that became a war factory industry during World War II. After Chicago and the other three surviving NBL teams all won their home games played against Toledo, they alongside the rest of the league would adjust the rest of their schedules to play seven or eight games against the rest of their remaining brethren, despite the rest of the season going from five teams to a lowly four teams remaining in the NBL.

Despite the trying circumstances at hand throughout their season (which included lots of road losses combined with home venue issues involving a mixture of playing games at the Cicero Stadium, Chicago Coliseum, and DuSable High School (alongside a planned decision to play at Michigan Avenue's Armory), which helped play a factor into the Studebaker Flyers not bothering to return to the NBL for the following season), both the Chicago Studebaker Flyers and third place Oshkosh All-Stars would both automatically qualify for the 1943 NBL Playoffs due to the low number of teams and abrupt scheduling changes involved earlier in the season. The Studebaker Flyers would have the second-most stable roster of the four surviving NBL teams this season (which was helped with their roster being paid through Studebaker (who became a war industry facility by this time similar to the Zollner Piston Company for the Fort Wayne Zollner Pistons) by the United Auto Workers Association this season) with eight of their players playing in at least 18 out of the 23 league games scheduled for the season, but they would end up being scheduled for a semifinal series match-up against the Fort Wayne Zollner Pistons, who had both the best regular season of the NBL teams around and the most stable NBL roster of them all with nine of their players playing in at least 18 out of 23 league games scheduled for their season. While the Studebaker Flyers would surprisingly stun the Zollner Pistons in their first playoff game played in Chicago, their efforts would not be enough as Chicago would lose to Fort Wayne 2–1 as they advanced to the NBL Finals. Soon after that, the Studebaker franchise would rebrand themselves to the South Bend Studebaker Champions by the time the 1943 World Professional Basketball Tournament commenced before later folding operations altogether (with the cause being blamed on perceived racism between players when they were just arguing on typical practicing issues), with their team operations being replaced by the newly created Cleveland Chase Brassmen in order to help the NBL maintain operations for another season.

== Roster ==
Player	Position
Sonny Boswell	G
Hillery Brown	G-F
Duke Cumberland	G-F
Dick Evans	F-C
Roosie Hudson	F-C
Al Johnson	F
Mike Novak	C
Johnny Orr	G
Tony Peyton	G-F
Babe Pressley	G-F
Bernie Price	F-C
Paul Sokody	F
Ted Strong	F-C

Note: Roosie Hudson, Johnny Orr, Tony Peyton, and Paul Sokody were not a part of the playoff roster for the Chicago Studebaker Flyers.

== Regular season ==
=== Season standings ===
Pos.	League Standings	Wins	Losses	Win %
1	Fort Wayne Zollner Pistons	17	6	.739
2	Sheboygan Red Skins	12	11	.522
3	Oshkosh All-Stars	11	12	.478
4	Chicago Studebaker Flyers	8	15	.348
5	Toledo Jim White Chevrolets^{†}	0	4	.000
^{†}Toledo disbanded during the season

=== NBL Schedule ===
An official database created by John Grasso detailing every NBL match possible (outside of two matches that the Kankakee Gallagher Trojans won over the Dayton Metropolitans in 1938) would be released in 2026 showcasing every team's official schedules throughout their time spent in the NBL. As such, these are the official results recorded for the Chicago Studebaker Flyers during their only season in the NBL.

- November 25, 1942 @ Sheboygan, WI: Chicago Studebaker Flyers 45, Sheboygan Red Skins 53
- November 28, 1942 @ Oshkosh, WI: Chicago Studebaker Flyers 40, Oshkosh All-Stars 41
- December 1, 1942 @ Fort Wayne, IN: Chicago Studebaker Flyers 54, Fort Wayne Zollner Pistons 47
- December 6, 1942 @ Oshkosh, WI: Chicago Studebaker Flyers 46, Oshkosh All-Stars 35
- December 11, 1942 @ Chicago, IL: Toledo Jim White Chevrolets 30, Chicago Studebaker Flyers 42
- December 20, 1942 @ Chicago, IL: Sheboygan Red Skins 41, Chicago Studebaker Flyers 43
- December 25, 1942 @ Sheboygan, WI: Chicago Studebaker Flyers 46, Sheboygan Red Skins 55
- December 26, 1942 @ Oshkosh, WI: Chicago Studebaker Flyers 33, Oshkosh All-Stars 44
- January 5, 1943 @ Fort Wayne, IN: Chicago Studebaker Flyers 49, Fort Wayne Zollner Pistons 62
- January 8, 1943 @ Milwaukee, WI: Fort Wayne Zollner Pistons 78, Chicago Studebaker Flyers 62
- January 10, 1943 @ Chicago, IL: Oshkosh All-Stars 51, Chicago Studebaker Flyers 41
- January 17, 1943 @ Chicago, IL: Fort Wayne Zollner Pistons 64, Chicago Studebaker Flyers 59
- January 19, 1943 @ Fort Wayne, IN: Chicago Studebaker Flyers 38, Fort Wayne Zollner Pistons 46
- January 21, 1943 @ Sheboygan, WI: Chicago Studebaker Flyers 42, Sheboygan Red Skins 40
- January 23, 1943: Chicago Studebaker Flyers 58, Oshkosh All-Stars 52 (2OT @ Oshkosh, WI)
- January 24, 1943 @ Chicago, IL: Sheboygan Red Skins 37, Chicago Studebaker Flyers 48
- January 27, 1943 @ Fort Wayne IN: Chicago Studebaker Flyers 54, Fort Wayne Zollner Pistons 61
- January 31, 1943 @ Chicago, IL: Oshkosh All-Stars 60, Chicago Studebaker Flyers 73
- February 2, 1943 @ Fort Wayne, IN: Chicago Studebaker Flyers 50, Fort Wayne Zollner Pistons 73
- February 6, 1943 @ Chicago, IL: Oshkosh All-Stars 63, Chicago Studebaker Flyers 55
- February 7, 1943 @ Chicago, IL: Sheboygan Red Skins 47, Chicago Studebaker Flyers 45
- February 11, 1943 @ Sheboygan, WI: Chicago Studebaker Flyers 42, Sheboygan Red Skins 44
- February 14, 1943 @ Chicago, IL: Fort Wayne Zollner Pistons 45, Chicago Studebaker Flyers 44

== NBL Playoffs ==
=== NBL Semifinals ===
(4) Chicago Studebaker Flyers vs. (1) Fort Wayne Zollner Pistons: Fort Wayne wins series 2–1

- Game 1: February 20, 1943 @ Fort Wayne: Fort Wayne 49, Chicago 37
- Game 2: February 22, 1943 @ Chicago: Chicago 45, Fort Wayne 32
- Game 3: February 23, 1943 @ Fort Wayne: Fort Wayne 44, Chicago 32

== Awards and honors ==
- Sonny Boswell – All-NBL Second Team
- Mike Novak – All-Time NBL Team
- Bernie Price would lead the league in free-throws made that season with 77 total free-throws made.

== World Professional Basketball Tournament ==
After being eliminated by the Fort Wayne Zollner Pistons in the 1943 NBL Playoffs, the Chicago Studebaker Flyers would end up moving their operations to South Bend, Indiana and rebranded themselves into the South Bend Studebaker Champions, later adding another player named Agis Bray to help round out their roster for the upcoming 1943 World Professional Basketball Tournament. Even though the Studebaker franchise would have a surprise, sudden move and rebranding before starting the World Professional Basketball Tournament, the recently rebranded franchise would join the other three NBL teams in participating in the 1943 event that would take place on March 15–18, 1943 and was mostly held by independently ran teams alongside them this season (with twelve total teams competing this year due to the need for cutting traveling costs this time around) due in part to World War II. In the first round of the event, the Studebaker franchise would see themselves go up against the Minneapolis Sparklers (sometimes expanded out into the Minneapolis Rock Springs Sparklers) that were made up of local players from Minneapolis, Minnesota. Despite the Studebaker franchise being led by some former Harlem Globetrotters players at the time of the tournament, they were surprisingly upset in the first round by the Sparklers due, in part, to the play of future Hall of Famer John Kundla and future NBL/BAA/NBA player Kleggie Hermsen, as they would barely survive against the South Bend Studebaker Champions 45–44. The Sparklers would later be crushed by the eventual champions of the 1943 WPBT, the all-black Washington Bears (who were primarily made up of former New York Renaissance players at the time and were essentially taking on the place of the all-black New York Renaissance in the WPBT this year), by a 42–21 beatdown before the Bears beat the Dayton Dive Bombers (who themselves beat the Chicago Ramblers and the Harlem Globetrotters in their previous rounds) in the semifinal round and then the 1942 WPBT champion Oshkosh All-Stars in the championship match-up.

=== Game played ===
- Lost first round (44–45) to the Minneapolis Sparklers
