= The Harlem Globetrotters (film) =

1951 film directed by Phil Brown

- Dorothy Dandridge and Billy Brown in 1951 theatrical poster.
- Directed by: Phil Brown; Will Jason
- Produced by: Buddy Adler
- Starring: Thomas Gomez; Bill Walker; Dorothy Dandridge
- Cinematography: Philip Tannura
- Edited by: James Sweeney
- Music by: Arthur Morton
- Distributed by: Columbia Pictures
- Release date: October 24, 1951
- Running time: 78 minutes
- Country: United States
- Language: English

The Harlem Globetrotters is a 1951 sports drama film about the Harlem Globetrotters, a famous exhibition basketball team. The film was released by Columbia Pictures and stars Thomas Gomez, Bill Walker, Dorothy Dandridge, Angela Clarke and Peter M. Thompson.

== Plot ==
Billy Townsend, a gifted but uncertain young college player, joins the Harlem Globetrotters, seeking direction and opportunity. As the Globetrotters travel the country facing discrimination, unfair treatment and skepticism, Billy struggles with personal temptations, fame and the pressure of representing his race. Through hard-fought games, mentorship from his teammates and growing discipline, Billy matures into a true team player. The Globetrotters’ talent, unity and perseverance challenge attitudes and help break barriers in professional basketball, securing Billy’s future and the team’s place in history.

== Cast ==
- Thomas Gomez as Abe Saperstein
- Billy Brown as Billy Townsend
- Dorothy Dandridge as Ann Carpenter
- Angela Clarke as Sylvia Saperstein
- Peter M. Thompson as Martin
- Bill Walker as Professor
- Roscoe Cumberland as Roscoe
- William 'Pop' Gates as Pop Gates
- Marques Haynes as Marques Haynes
- Louis 'Babe' Pressley as Babe Pressley
- Ermer Robinson as Elmer Robinson
- Ted Strong as Ted Strong
- Reece 'Goose' Tatum as Goose Tatum
- Frank Washington as Frank Washington
- Clarence Wilson as Clarence Wilson

== Reception ==
Critic Edwin Schallert of the Los Angeles Times called the film "a very human story" and wrote: "The Globetrotters add a lot of humor to their actual proficiency in the game and the film ... Gomez and Miss Dandridge are particularly successful in their work, Gomez being reliability itself."

== See also ==
- List of basketball films
