= Beneath the 12-Mile Reef =

1953 film directed by Robert D. Webb

- Theatrical release poster
- Directed by: Robert D. Webb
- Written by: A. I. Bezzerides
- Produced by: Robert Bassler
- Starring: Robert Wagner; Terry Moore; Gilbert Roland; Richard Boone; Peter Graves
- Cinematography: Edward Cronjager
- Edited by: William Reynolds
- Music by: Bernard Herrmann
- Color process: Technicolor
- Distributed by: 20th Century-Fox
- Release date: December 2, 1953
- Running time: 102 minutes
- Country: United States
- Language: English
- Budget: $1.56 million
- Box office: $3.6 million (US rentals); $3.5 million (foreign rentals)

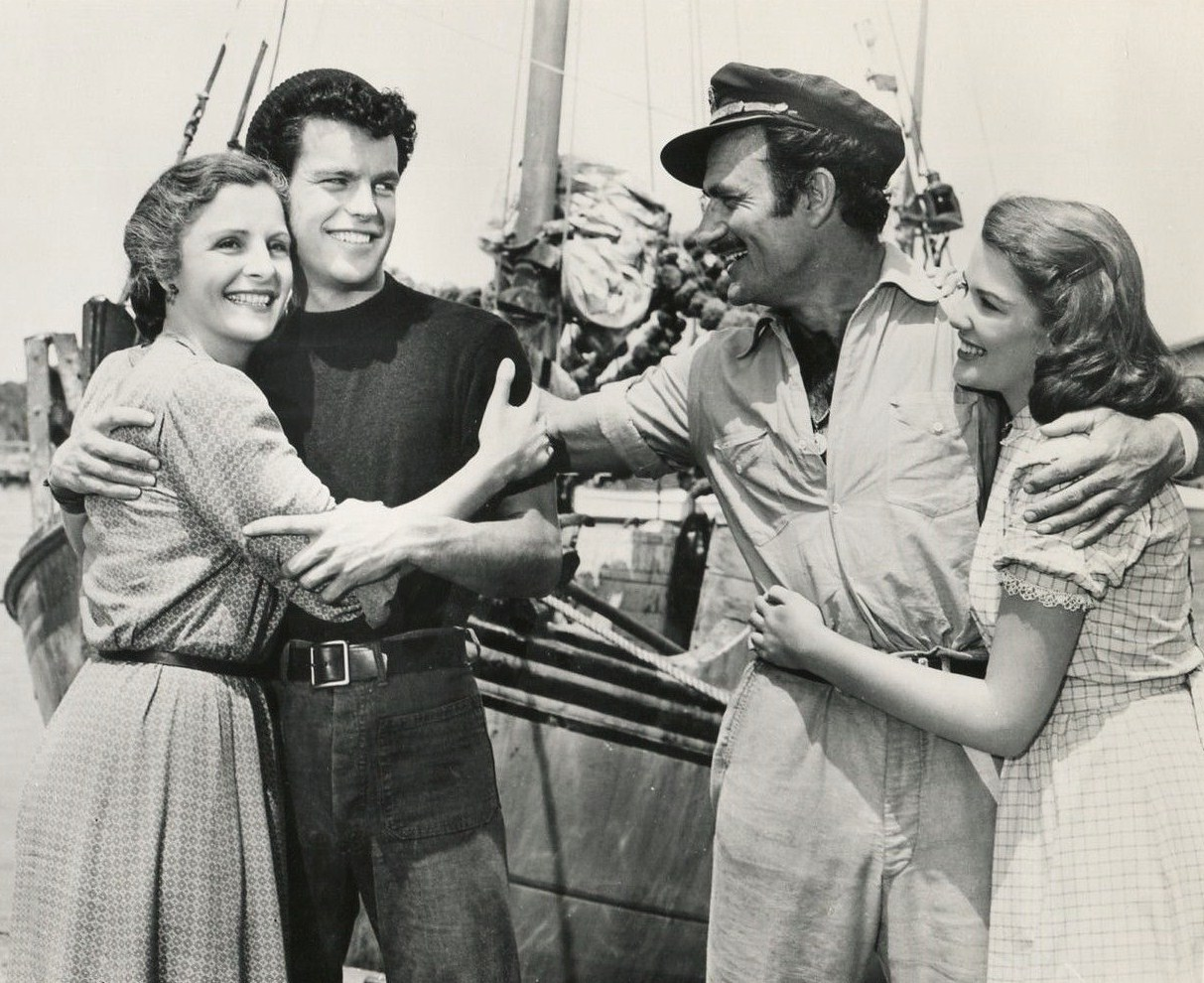
L-R: Angela Clarke, Robert Wagner, Gilbert Roland & Gloria Gordon

Beneath the 12-Mile Reef is a 1953 American adventure film directed by Robert D. Webb and starring Robert Wagner, Terry Moore and Gilbert Roland. The screenplay was by A. I. Bezzerides. The film was the third motion picture made in CinemaScope, coming after The Robe and How to Marry a Millionaire. The supporting cast features J. Carrol Naish, Richard Boone, Peter Graves, Jay Novello, Harry Carey Jr. and Jacques Aubuchon.

== Plot ==
Mike and Tony Petrakis are Greek American father and son sponge-diving entrepreneurs who find themselves in competition with the Rhys family, Conch fishermen who are prepared to resort to violence and threatening murder to maintain their established fishing grounds off the Gulf Coast of Florida. Run-ins between the two clans lead to an exchange of threats and all-out brawls. Further complications ensue when Tony Petrakis meets Gwyneth Rhys, and the two fall in love.

Beneath the 12-Mile Reef (1953)

== Cast ==
- Robert Wagner as Tony Petrakis
- Terry Moore as Gwyneth Rhys
- Gilbert Roland as Mike Petrakis
- J. Carrol Naish as Socrates Houlis
- Richard Boone as Thomas Rhys
- Angela Clarke as Mama Petrakis
- Peter Graves as Arnold Dix
- Jay Novello as Sinan
- Jacques Aubuchon as Demetrios Sofotes
- Gloria Gordon as Penny Petrakis
- Harry Carey Jr. as Griff Rhys
- Rev. Theophilus Karaphillis as Greek Priest at Epiphany

== Production ==
The film originally was called Twelve Mile Reef and was announced in September 1952, with the leads to be played by Robert Wagner and Kathleen Crowley. By December, the female lead was going to be Debra Paget.

In February 1953, 20th Century-Fox announced that the film would be shot in CinemaScope. That month, the first CinemaScope movie, The Robe, began filming. Beneath the 12 Mile Reef was the third film shot in that process, after How to Marry a Millionaire, and the first shot underwater.

Also that month, Terry Moore was given the female lead.

Filming started April 6, 1953. The film was shot on location in Key West and Tarpon Springs, Florida.

There were rumors during filming that Moore and Wagner had a romance. In reality, Wagner was secretly seeing Barbara Stanwyck, and Moore was seeing Howard Hughes.

Wagner almost drowned during filming at Tarpon Springs when he was accidentally kicked in the stomach by another actor. He sank to the bottom of the water and had to be rescued by a crew member.

Gloria Gordon, who had a small role, was signed to a seven-year contract.

== Critical reception ==
Bosley Crowther of The New York Times observed "Another and further extension of the range of CinemaScope ... is handsomely manifested in Beneath the 12-Mile Reef ... But that, when you come right down to it, is just about the only novelty provided by this third employment of the anamorphic lens. For the scenes shot above the surface, while large and imposing, are routine, and the drama developed in the screen play is hackneyed and banal. And, unfortunately, most of the picture takes place above, not below, the reef ... There is nothing at all fascinating or edifying here."

Variety wrote "[T]he squeeze-lensing gives punch in the display of underwater wonders, the seascapes and the brilliant, beautiful sunrises and sunsets of the Florida Gulf coast. In handling the young cast, Robert D. Webb's direction is less effective, particularly in the case of Robert Wagner and Terry Moore. Both are likable, so the shallowness of their performances is no serious handicap to the entertainment."

== Copyright ==
This film is in the public domain, as the copyright was not renewed.

== Awards and nominations ==
Edward Cronjager was nominated for the Academy Award for Best Cinematography, and Robert D. Webb was nominated for the Grand Prize at the 1954 Cannes Film Festival.

== See also ==
- Sixteen Fathoms Deep (1934) – 1934 American film by Armand Schaefer
- Down to the Sea (1936) – 1936 American drama film by Lewis D. Collins
- Sixteen Fathoms Deep (1948 film) – 1948 American adventure film directed by Irving Allen
