= Al Johnson (basketball) =

American basketball player

Personal information
- Born: August 20, 1913 Chicago, Illinois
- Died: February 2, 1991 (aged 77)
- Listed height: 6 ft 3 in (1.91 m)
- Listed weight: 210 lb (95 kg)
- Position: Forward

Career history
- 1933–1937: Chicago Crusaders
- 1936–1937: Palmer House Indians
- 1937–1940: New York Rens
- 1939–1940: Chicago Crusaders
- 1940–1943: Harlem Globetrotters
- 1943: Chicago Studebaker Flyers
- 1945–1947: Chicago Colored Collegians

Albert C. "Big Train" Johnson Jr. (August 20, 1913 – February 2, 1991) was an American professional basketball player. He played in the National Basketball League for the Chicago Studebaker Flyers in one game during the 1942–43 season. He also played in independent leagues, including a stint on the Harlem Globetrotters.
