= Dick Evans (athlete) =

American football and basketball player (1915–2008)

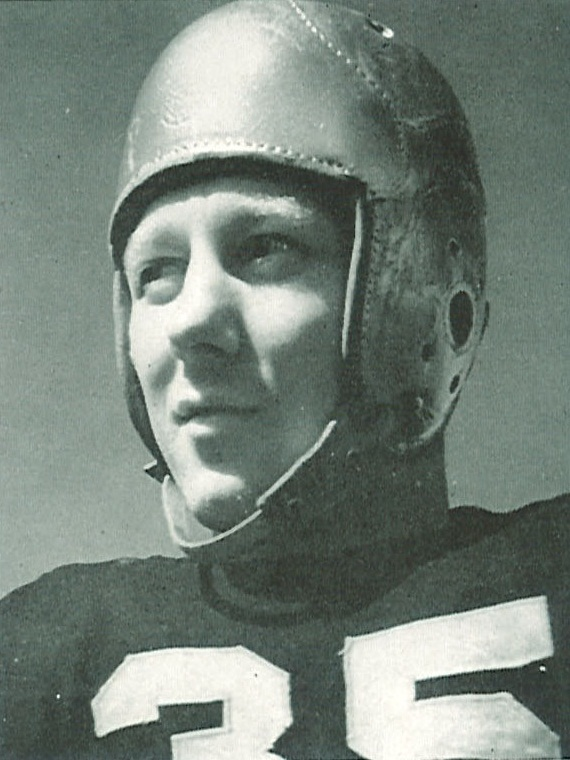
- Evans from 1941 Hawkeye

No. 53, 28, 35, 22
- Position: End

Personal information
- Born: May 31, 1915; Chicago, Illinois, U.S.
- Died: May 26, 2008 (aged 92); Sarasota, Florida, U.S.
- Listed height: 6 ft 3 in (1.91 m)
- Listed weight: 205 lb (93 kg)

Career information
- High school: DePaul Academy (Chicago, Illinois)
- College: Iowa
- NFL draft: 1940: undrafted

Career history

Playing
- Green Bay Packers (1940); Chicago Cardinals (1940–1942); Green Bay Packers (1943); El Toro (1944)

Coaching
- Santa Barbara Marines (1945) Head coach; Long Beach (1946) Line coach; Nevada (1947–1950) Assistant coach; Loyola (LA) (1951) Assistant coach; Chicago Cardinals (1952) Line coach; Washington Redskins (1955–1958) Line coach; Notre Dame (1959) Line coach; Cleveland Browns (1960–1963) Defensive line coach; Philadelphia Eagles (1964–1968) Defensive coach; Green Bay Packers (1970) Defensive backs coach; New England Patriots (1971–1972) Defensive coordinator, defensive line coach

Awards and highlights
- Basketball career

Career information
- College: Iowa (1939–1940)
- Position: Forward, center

Career history
- 1940: Hammond Ciesar All-Americans
- 1940: Sheboygan Red Skins
- 1941–1942: Chicago Bruins
- 1942–1943: Chicago Studebaker Flyers
- Stats at Pro Football Reference

Richard Jacob Evans (May 31, 1915 – May 26, 2008) was an American football and basketball player and coach of football. He played both college football and college basketball at the University of Iowa before graduating in 1940. Evans then played professional football as an end in the National Football League (NFL) for four seasons, from 1940 to 1943, the Green Bay Packers and the Chicago Cardinals. At the same time, he played professional basketball with Sheboygan Red Skins, the Chicago Bruins, and Chicago Studebaker Flyers. After serving as an officer in the United States Marine Corp during World War II, Evans coached football from 1946 to 1972, first at the college level and then with several NFL teams.

== Early life and college career ==
Evans was born on May 31, 1915, in Chicago.

== Professional athlete ==
=== Basketball ===
Evans played for four teams in the National Basketball League between the 1940–41 and 1942–43 seasons: the Hammond Ciesar All-Americans, Sheboygan Red Skins, Chicago Bruins, and Chicago Studebaker Flyers. In 32 career games played he averaged 2.4 points per game.

=== Football ===
Evans also played with the Green Bay Packers during the 1940 NFL season and the 1943 NFL season. During the two season in between, he played with the Chicago Cardinals.

== Military service ==
Evans served as an officer in the United States Marine Corps during World War II. He played for the 1944 El Toro Flying Marines football team coached by Dick Hanley. The following year, he was the head coach of the 1945 Santa Barbara Marines football team.

== Coaching career ==
In 1946, Evans was hired as the line coach at Long Beach City College in Long Beach City College under head football coach Ed Wagner. The next year, he moved on to the University of Nevada to become an assistant under head football coach Joe Sheeketski. After four seasons at Nevada, Evan resigned, in January 1951, to seek a head coaching job. He was an assistant coach at Loyola University of Los Angeles during the 1951 season. In May 1952, Evans returned to the Chicago Cardinals as line coach under head coach Joe Kuharich.

Evans was a member of the Marines in 1953 and 1954 and coached football teams at the Naval Air Station San Diego and Naval Air Station Atsugi. During this time, Evans discovered Johnny Green and recommended him to Michigan State basketball coach Forddy Anderson.

Evans was an assistant with the Washington Redskins from 1955 to 1958, Notre Dame in 1959, the Cleveland Browns from 1960 to 1963, the Philadelphia Eagles from 1964 to 1968, the Green Bay Packers in 1970, and the New England Patriots from 1971 to 1972.

== Head coaching record ==
Year	Team	Overall	Conference	Standing	Bowl/playoffs
Santa Barbara Marines (Independent) (1945)
1945	Santa Barbara Marines	7–3–1			
Santa Barbara Marines:		7–3–1			
Total:		7–3–1			
