= Angela Clarke (American actress) =

American actress (1909–2010)

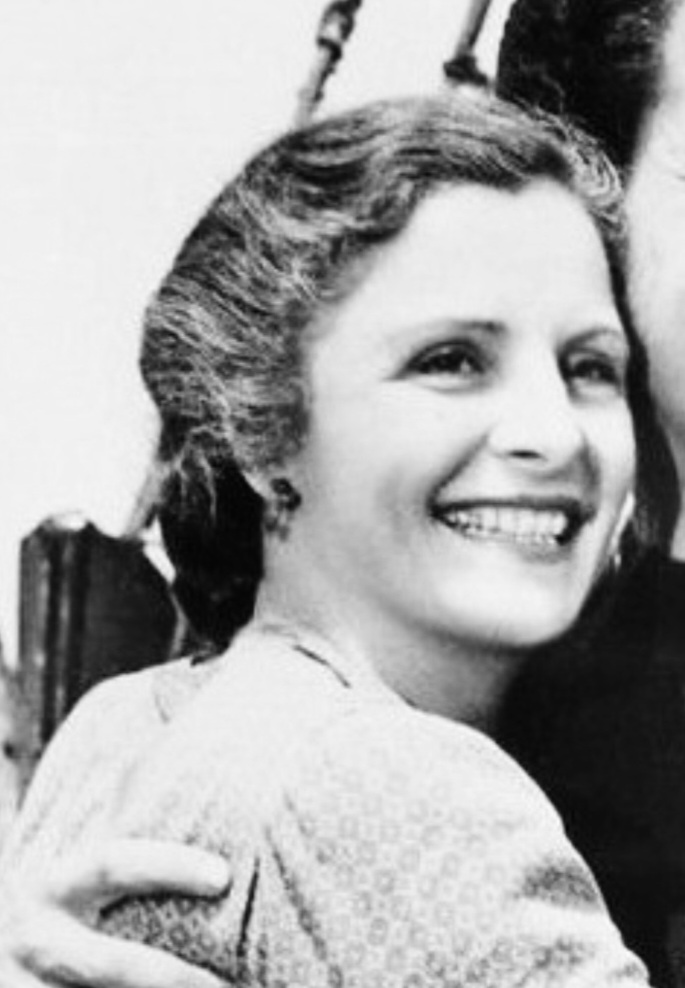
- Clarke in Beneath the 12-Mile Reef (1953)
- Born: August 14, 1909; New York City, US
- Died: December 16, 2010 (aged 101); Moorpark, California, US
- Occupation: Actress
- Years active: 1946–1955, 1961–1988

Angela Clarke (August 14, 1909 – December 16, 2010) was an American stage, television and film actress.

== Career ==
Clarke entered film acting at a relatively late age. She was nearly forty when she landed a series of uncredited roles, beginning with Her Sister's Secret (1946). Her first screen credit was for The Undercover Man (1949). She then proceeded to corner the market on grey-haired, matriarchal characters, such as her performance as Mama Caruso in The Great Caruso (1951).

In the course of forty years, Clarke appeared on screen over sixty times, counting her work in films and in guest spots on TV series episodes. Although she generally had background roles and bit parts, the films where she made a more substantial impression included Darling, How Could You! (1951), The Harlem Globetrotters (1951), The Miracle of Our Lady of Fatima (1952), House of Wax (1953), Houdini (1953), and The Seven Little Foys (1955), in which she had a sizable supporting role as Bob Hope's disapproving sister-in-law.

Clarke's acting career came to a halt after The Seven Little Foys was released in June 1955. That was the month she testified before the House Un-American Activities Committee (HUAC). She was previously named as a Communist to the HUAC by Judith Raymond, and by Carin Kinzel Burrows (wife of Abe Burrows). In her testimony, Clarke admitted she had been a member of the Communist Party USA from 1942 to 1949. She said she drifted away from the Party "because acting was more important". However, she would not "name names" of her Communist associates, and for that she was blacklisted. She didn't work again in films until 1962. The year before, she had obtained her first TV acting job (on the premiere episode of Ben Casey) and would continue to supplement her film work with guest appearances on TV series.

== Death ==
Angela Clarke died on December 16, 2010, in Moorpark, California. She was 101.

== Filmography ==
Year	Film	Role	Notes
1946	Her Sister's Secret	Cafe Cashier	(uncredited)
1947	Backlash	Mrs. O'Neill	(uncredited)
1947	Night Song	Woman	(uncredited)
1947	A Double Life	Lucy	(uncredited)
1948	The Snake Pit	Greek Patient	(uncredited)
1949	The Undercover Man	Theresa Rocco	
1949	House of Settlement	Clara Christopher	
1949	The Doctor and the Girl	Miss Rourke	(uncredited)
1949	Mrs. Mike	Sarah Carpentier	
1950	Captain Carey, U.S.A.	Serafina	
1950	Woman in Hiding	Clara May's Mother	(uncredited)
1950	The Gunfighter	Mac's Wife	(uncredited)
1950	Outrage	Madge Harrison	
1950	The Killer That Stalked New York	Mrs. Dominic	(uncredited)
1950	Undercover Girl	Babe Snell	
1951	The Great Caruso	Mama Caruso	
1951	The Harlem Globetrotters	Sylvia Saperstein	
1951	Darling, How Could You!	Nurse	
1951	It's a Big Country	Mama Esposito	
1951	My Favorite Spy	Gypsy Fortune Teller	
1952	The Miracle of Our Lady of Fatima	Maria Rosa Abóbora dos Santos	
1952	The Savage	Pehangi	
1953	House of Wax	Mrs. Andrews	
1953	Houdini	Harry's Mother	
1953	Beneath the 12-Mile Reef	Mama Petrakis	
1954	The Egyptian	Kipa	(uncredited)
1954	The Bounty Hunter	Señora Maria Dominquez	(uncredited)
1955	The Seven Little Foys	Aunt Clara Morando	
1962	The Interns	Mrs. Emma Auer	
1966	Blindfold	Lavinia Vincenti	
1973	The Girl Most Likely To...	Actress	TV movie
1974	Nightmare Honeymoon	Lady in the Park	
1974	Harrad Summer	Mrs. Kolasukas	
1978	The Ghost of Flight 401	Mrs. Collura	TV movie
1986	Killer in the Mirror	Mrs. Wilkens	TV movie
1988	Memories of Me	Mrs. Petrakis	(small part)

== Television ==
Year	Show	Role	Notes
1961	Ben Casey	Mrs. Salazar	Episode: To the Pure
1962	Going My Way	Mama Cipollaro	Episode: Not Good Enough for my Sister
1962	Alcoa Premiere	Mama	Episode: The Potentate
1963	Combat!	Madame Michelin / Claire Brouchard	Episode playing Mme. Michelin: No Hallelujahs for Glory Episode playing Claire Brouchard: Reunion (both 1963)
1962 - 1963	The Untouchables	Catherine Chavis / Mrs. Santos	Episode playing Catherine Chavis: Come and Kill Me (1962) Episode playing Mrs. Santos: The Spoiler (1963)
1964	The Outer Limits	Sue Ann Beasley	Episode: Second Chance
1962 - 1964	Gunsmoke	Topsanah / Carrie Newcom / Mrs. Crabbe	Episode playing Topsanah: Quint Asper Comes Home (1962) Episode playing Carrie Newcom: The Far Places (1963) Episode playing Mrs. Crabbe: Trip West (1964)
1965	Mr. Novak	Mother General	Episode: There's a Penguin in my Garden
1966	The Virginian	Mary Tait	Episode: The Inchworm's Got No Wings at All
1966	Dr. Kildare	Dahlia Rossi	Two episodes: The Art of Taking a Powder Read the Book and then See the Picture
1966	Daniel Boone	Wanona	Episode: The Allegiances
1967	Dundee and the Culhane	Maria	Episode: The Vasquez Brief
1967	Mission: Impossible	Nancy Stoner	Episode: The Survivors
1968	The High Chaparral	Sister Luke	Episode: A Joyful Noise
1965 - 1969	Death Valley Days	Rosie Winters / Theresa Pico / Serafina	Episode playing Rosie Winters: The Trouble with Taxes (1965) Episode playing Theresa Pico: The Firebrand (1966) Episode playing Serafina: The Great Pinto Bean Gold Hunt (1969)
1965 - 1970	Bonanza	Teresa / Mrs. Marshall	Episode playing Teresa: Jonah (1965) Episode playing Mrs. Marshall: It's a Small World (1970)
1970	Arnie	Helena Nuvo	Episode: Pilot
1970	Bracken's World	Mama Finello / Norma	Episode playing Mama Finello: Focus on a Gun Episode playing Norma: Preview in Samarkand
1970	The Young Lawyers	Mrs. McGuire	Episode: At the Edge of the Night
1971	Alias Smith and Jones	Hannah Utley	Episode: Stagecoach Seven
1973	The Partridge Family	Myra Fromacher	Episode: The Partridge Connection
1974	Kojak	Mrs. Harrington	Episode: Cross Your Heart and Hope to Die
1974 - 1975	Petrocelli	Mrs. Donato / Mrs. Moran	Episode playing Mrs. Donato: An Act of Love (1974) Episode playing Mrs. Moran: Five Yards of Trouble (1975)
1976	Rich Man, Poor Man	Mrs. Jardino	Mini-series Appears in Part III: Chapter 5
1974 - 1977	Insight	Maria Abrams / Lillian	Episode playing Maria Abrams: And the Walls Came Tumblin' Down (1974) Episode playing Lillian: Arnstein's Miracle (1977)
1977 - 1978	Baretta	Mama / Mrs. Volga	Episode playing Mama: New Girl in Town (1977) Episode playing Mrs. Volga: The Gadjo (1978)
1978	Fantasy Island	Nana	Episode: Return/The Toughest Man Alive
1979	All in the Family	Mrs. Loretta Dillon	Episode: Edith Gets Fired
1983	Voyagers!	Sara Delano Roosevelt	Episode: Destiny's Choice
1983	Brookside	Elsa	Two episodes: Better Things to Do In Clink (both 1973)
1984	St. Elsewhere	Emma Keuhnelian	Three episodes: Attack After Dark Vanity (all 1984)
1985	MacGyver	Caterina Bennett	Episode: The Prodigal
