= Houdini (1953 film) =

1953 film by George Marshall

- Theatrical release poster
- Directed by: George Marshall
- Written by: Philip Yordan
- Based on: Houdini; 1928 novel by Harold Kellock
- Produced by: George Pal; Berman Swarttz
- Starring: Tony Curtis; Janet Leigh; Torin Thatcher
- Cinematography: Ernest Laszlo
- Edited by: George Tomasini
- Music by: Roy Webb
- Distributed by: Paramount Pictures
- Release date: July 2, 1953
- Running time: 106 minutes
- Country: United States
- Language: English
- Box office: $1.8 million (US)

Houdini is a 1953 American Technicolor biographical film from Paramount Pictures, produced by George Pal and Berman Swarttz, directed by George Marshall, that stars Tony Curtis and Janet Leigh. The film's screenplay, based upon the life of magician and escape artist Harry Houdini, was written by Philip Yordan, based on the book Houdini by Harold Kellock. The film's music score was by Roy Webb and the cinematography by Ernest Laszlo. The art direction was by Albert Nozaki and Hal Pereira, and the costume design by Edith Head.

The film's storyline is a fictionalized account of Houdini's life. It details his beginnings as a carnival performer, later as a worker in a safe factory, and finally his international success as a world-renowned escape artist and stage magician. Following the death of his mother, he exposes various fraudulent mediums in the spiritualist movement, while always hoping to make contact with her. The film also follows his love for his wife Bess Houdini and his most dangerous stunts and stage illusions.

== Plot ==
In the 1890s, young Harry Houdini is performing with a Coney Island carnival as Bruto, the Wild Man, when Bess, a naive onlooker, tries to protect him from the blows of Schultz, his "handler". Harry also appears as magician "The Great Houdini" and, spotting Bess in the audience, invites her on stage. When Harry flirts with the unsuspecting Bess, she quickly leaves. Bess shows up two more times, and finally admits her attraction. They marry and live with Harry's mother. Bess becomes Harry's onstage assistant, touring the country with him.

Bess tires of the low pay and grueling schedule and convinces Harry to take a job in a locksmith factory. Harry, a lock tester, fantasizes about escaping from one of the factory's large safes. On Halloween, Harry and Bess attend the Magician Society dinner. Magician Fante offers a prize to anyone who can free himself from a straitjacket. As many frantically jump about trying to escape, Harry, through intense concentration, extricates himself from the jacket, impressing Fante. Later, Fante advises Harry to give up being a magician, noting that Johann Von Schweger, a German magician, retired at the height of his career after performing a similar feat, fearful of his own talents. Bess persuades Harry to cash in the single, round-trip boat ticket to Europe he won, to save for a down payment on a house.

At the factory, Harry locks himself inside a big safe, determined to escape. However, the foreman orders the safe blown open before Harry can get out, then fires him. Harry and Bess argue about their future, and frustrated by Bess wanting him to quit magic, Harry walks out. A contrite Bess finds Harry performing with a carnival and presents him with two one-way tickets to Europe. During a performance at London theater, a reporter challenges Harry to escape Scotland Yard's notoriously secure jail cells. Harry, who hired the reporter to issue the challenge, accepts, unaware that the cell locks are not in the doors, but on the outside wall. Though challenging, Houdini successfully picks the lock. Now billed as, "the man who escaped Scotland Yard", Harry and Bess embark on a successful European tour.

In Berlin Harry searches for the reclusive Von Schweger. Meanwhile, Harry is arrested for fraud, but during his trial, he denies ever claiming to have supernatural powers, insisting his tricks are accomplished through physical means. To prove his point, Harry locks himself inside a safe in the courtroom and successfully escapes. Vindicated, Harry then goes to see Von Schweger, who finally responded to his queries. However, Von Schweger's assistant, Otto, says the magician died two days earlier. Otto reveals that Von Schweger summoned Harry to ask him the secret of "dematerialization", a feat he accomplished once but could not repeat. Although Harry demurs, Otto insists on becoming Harry's new assistant and travels with him to New York City.

Once back in America, Harry finds he is virtually unknown. For publicity, he hangs upside down on a skyscraper flagpole, constrained by a straitjacket. Harry executes the escape and soon becomes known. Harry prepares to be submerged in a box in the cold Detroit River. During the performance, the chain holding the box breaks, and it drops into an opening in the ice-covered river. Although Harry escapes the box, the current drags him downstream. He struggles to find air pockets under the ice and swim back to the opening. Above, Bess and the horrified audience assume Harry has drowned and proclaim his demise. To Bess's relief, Harry shows up later at their hotel, saying that he heard his mother's voice, directing him toward the opening. Just then, Harry receives word that his mother died at the exact time that he heard her calling.

Two years later in New York, Harry has not performed since his mother's death. He tells a reporter that he has been attempting to contact his mother's spirit, without success. Harry invites the reporter to attend a seance with him. The medium appears to have contacted his mother, but Harry and Otto expose her as a fake. After a public crusade against phony mediums, Harry plans to return to the stage and builds a torture water cell for the occasion. Terrified, Bess threatens to leave Harry unless he drops the dangerous trick, and he agrees not to perform it. Before the show, Harry admits to Otto that his appendix area is tender, but goes on, despite the pain. When the audience noisily demands that he perform the advertised "water torture" trick, Harry succumbs. He is immersed, upside down, in a tank of water. Weak, Harry is unable to escape and loses consciousness. Otto breaks the tank's glass, and after reviving, the now-dying Harry vows to a weeping Bess that, if possible, he will return.

== Cast ==
- Tony Curtis as Harry Houdini
- Janet Leigh as Bess Houdini
- Torin Thatcher as Otto
- Angela Clarke as Harry's Mother
- Stefan Schnabel as German Prosecuting Attorney
- Ian Wolfe as Malue
- Sig Ruman as Schultz
- Michael Pate as Dooley
- Connie Gilchrist as Mrs. Shultz
- Malcolm Lee Beggs as British Jail Warden
- Frank Orth as Mr. Hunter
- Barry Bernard as Inspector Marlick
- Douglas Spencer as Simms
- Fred Aldrich as Waiter/Bouncer (uncredited)
- Lyle Latell as Calcott (uncredited)
- Peter Baldwin as Fred (uncredited)
- Mabel Paige as Medium (uncredited)

== Production ==
In September 1951, it was announced that Paramount had bought The Life of Houdini and that George Pal would produce. Hedda Hopper suggested Orson Welles, who was a magician, would be an ideal star. Pal said he would make it after War of the Worlds.

Barré Lyndon wrote the first screenplay then Philip Yordan wrote another version. The distinguished magician, escapologist, and mentalist Joseph Dunninger, credited as "Dunninger", was technical adviser on the film. Dunninger was a good friend to many notables in the magic community including Houdini himself, Francis Martinka, and Tony Slydini.

In July 1952, Paramount announced that Tony Curtis and Janet Leigh would star under the direction of George Marshall. Curtis was borrowed from Universal, where he was under contract; he said he was delighted to make the film, as he had mainly been in action films up until that time. Leigh was borrowed from MGM. It would be the first time Curtis and Leigh, who were married, appeared together on screen. Leigh later said "Metro [MGM] was not very happy about the idea of loaning me to Paramount, but I was excited at the thought of doing it". Curtis wrote in his memoirs that he "wasn't sure if this was the best thing for my own career" as he did not always want to be associated with his wife.

To prepare for the role, Curtis trained with magician George Boston for one month. Joe Dunninger did the illusions. Leigh said she and Curtis learned the illusions "so that it wouldn't have to be done with camera trickery. When Tony levitated me, there were no cuts, and there were none during some of the other tricks — they were done "legit"." Leigh said, however, that the escape scenes were "fixed because Tony wasn't Houdini; he didn't have the ability to contort his body or to manipulate the locks like Houdini did. Houdini had tremendous spiritual energy. He could get his body into positions that were just [laughs] not human".

The film was originally meant to be shot in black-and-white, but the decision was made during pre-production to film it in color to take full advantage of the costumes and sets.

Leigh said Curtis received ice burns in the scene where he had to sit in a bathtub full of ice. She added that the last third of the film focused on Houdini seeing if he could contact his dead mother "rather than his wonderful ability and the love between the two of them. I agree that the last part of Houdini was much harder to pull off. Houdini was exposing the falsity of these charlatans [spiritualists], and I think it was more difficult for audiences to accept that phase of the picture, especially at that time".

Leigh enjoyed working with Curtis, and they would go on to make four more feature films together.

== Reception ==
Curtis said the film "was very successful. My secret hope, however, was that Houdini was going to propel me into a whole new kind of filmmaking, where I would be recognized as the serious actor I had always wanted to be. When that didn't happen I was terribly disappointed."
