= Alvin Hall (defensive back) =

American football player (born 1934)

No. 46
- Position: Defensive back

Personal information
- Born: August 12, 1934 (age 92); Fayette, Mississippi, U.S.
- Listed height: 6 ft 0 in (1.83 m)
- Listed weight: 198 lb (90 kg)

Career information
- High school: Chicago (IL) Wendell Phillips
- College: None

Career history
- Los Angeles Rams (1961–1963)

Career statistics
- Games played: 26
- Stats at Pro Football Reference

Alvin Hall (born August 12, 1934) was an American football player who played for Los Angeles Rams of the National Football League (NFL).

Born in Fayette, MS, Alvin moved to Chicago at 16 after the death of his mother. Though he loved sports, he never participated in organized high school athletics. He graduated from Wendell Phillips High in 1951.

Hall joined the U.S. Army immediately after graduation, and was stationed in Germany through 1953. After discharge from active duty, Hall returned to Chicago and worked as a bellhop at the Stevens Hotel until 1954.

Dissatisfied with his employment options, Hall enlisted in the United States Marine Corps in the fall of 1954. After basic training at the Parris Island Training Facility in 1955, he was assigned to USMC base in Okinawa, Japan.

It was here that he had an opportunity to participate in organized sports. The USMC had competitive sports teams in football, basketball, baseball, and boxing and Hall was drawn to football.

He excelled as a running back and defensive back winning All Marine honors during his tours of duty in Japan, Camp H.M. Smith in Ha’waii and the Marine Corps Recruit Depot in San Diego.

In a game against Fresno State University in 1958, Hall scored 4 touchdowns, gained over 200 yards rushing, and intercepted a pass on defense. NFL scout Fido Murphy was at that game, and made contact with the brass at MCRD regarding Hall’s availability for early discharge.

Because Hall was a drill sergeant, the Corps held him to his commitment, discharging him in 1961.

Murphy arranged for Hall to be invited to the Los Angeles Rams Training Camp in the summer of 1961. Hall made the Rams roster as a rookie defensive back and played for the Rams through the 1963 season. After release by the Rams, Hall made the opening day roster with the Pittsburgh Steelers in 1964, but was released due to injury before the season began. He ended his NFL career after being released by the Chicago Bears during preseason in 1965.

Hall is one of a handful of NFL players who had no college or high school football playing experience.
