= Geraldine McCullough =

American sculptor, painter (1917–2008)

- Born: Geraldine Mattie Hamilton; December 1, 1917; Kingston, Arkansas, U.S.
- Died: December 15, 2008 (aged 91); Oak Park, Illinois, U.S.
- Education: School of the Art Institute of Chicago (BA, MA)
- Occupations: Sculptor, painter, professor, academic administrator
- Spouse: Lester Wilder McCullough Sr. (1939–1988; his death)
- Children: 1

Geraldine McCullough (née Geraldine Mattie Hamilton; 1917–2008) was an African American sculptor, painter, professor, and academic administrator. She was best known for her mostly abstract large-scale metal sculpture. McCullough has created several large-scale public artworks, including two lifelike representations of Rev. Martin Luther King Jr.. She was the chair of the art department at Rosary College (now Dominican University) in River Forest, Illinois for twelve years.

== Early life, family, and education ==
Geraldine McCullough was born as Geraldine Hamilton on December 1, 1917, in Kingston, Arkansas, to African American parents Esther P. Duke and Hugh H. Hamilton. She was raised in Chicago, and graduated from Hyde Park High School (now Hyde Park Academy High School) in Chicago.

She married Lester Wilder McCullough Sr. in 1939, together they had one child.

McCullough received the John D. Steinbecker scholarship to study at the School of the Art Institute of Chicago, where she received a B.A. degree in 1948, and a M.A. degree in art education in 1955.

== Artwork ==
Using materials as varied as brazed sheet copper, sheet brass, rods, and polyester resins in her creations, the artist imbues her sculpture with movement and expressive qualities. Focussing on the inner vitality of the work, the artist executes her work mainly through bronze casting and welding of sheet copper, further enhancing the surface of the sculpture to result in vibrant and dynamic textural expression. According to her own words, McCullough intuitively channels what is on her mind at a given time, shaping her thoughts into large-scale metal sculpture characterized by an expressive intensity comparable to African sculpture. This is most evident in her sculpture Echo 5 from 1993 which evokes a seated African icon with headdress and body scarification. Her abstract welded steel sculptures have been compared by art historians such as Lisa E. Farrington to the artistic aesthetic and work of Barbara Chase-Riboud.

== Exhibitions ==
McCullough's work has been presented in several seminal exhibitions focussing on African American Women, most importantly: Forever Free: Art by African-American Women 1982–1980, an itinerant exhibition hosted by the Center for the Visual Arts Gallery, Illinois State University; the Joslyn Art Museum; the Montgomery Museum of Fine Arts; the Gibbes Art Gallery; The Art Gallery, University of Maryland, and the Indianapolis Museum of Art (1981–1982) and Three Generations of African American Women Sculptors: A Study in Paradox, an itinerant exhibition hosted by the Afro-American Historical and Cultural Museum (Philadelphia, Pa.) in March–September 1996 and the Center for the Study of African American Life and Culture, Smithsonian Institution, Washington, DC, March–August 1998.

Her work was further included in a group exhibition at the Brooklyn Museum in 1969 and other significant collective exhibitions including Eleven Black Printmakers, Superman College, Atlanta, Georgia, (1969); 25th Invitational - Sculpture, Illinois State Museum, Springfield, Illinois (1972);The Chicago Style: Sculpture (Eight Artist Invitational), University of Chicago, Chicago, Illinois (1974) Afro-American Art, Sculpture Johnson Museum, Cornell University, Ithaca, New York (1975); Twentieth Century Black American Artists, San Jose Museum of Art, San Jose, California (1976);

In 1970, the Schenectady Museum of Fine Arts, Schenectady, New York, presented a solo exhibition of McCullough's sculptures.

== Public sculpture ==
Several of Geraldine McCullough's public sculptures are installed in Chicago and across the state of Illinois. The artist has created most notably two large-scale bronze representations of Dr. Martin Luther King, Jr. Our King, Dr. Martin Luther King, Jr created in 1973 is located in Chicago and Martin Luther King, Jr. dedicated in 1988 is installed at the Freedom Corner in Springfield Illinois.

Other public sculptures include Phoenix Rising (1977), located at Maywood Civic Plaza (near 5th Ave. and Fred Hampton Way), Maywood, Illinois; The Bronzeville Walk of Fame in Chicago; The Spirit of Du Sable (1977) at the Du Sable Museum of African American History sculpture garden in Chicago; Millflower (1979) in Geneva, Illinois, and Pathfinder, dedicated in 1982 and located in Oak Park, Illinois where McCullough lived and worked during her last 40 years (1968–2008).

== Teaching ==
For about 15 years McCullough taught art at Wendell Phillips High School (now Wendell Phillips Academy High School), a public high school in Chicago.

She served as a professor of art and chair of the art department at the Rosary College (now Dominican University), in River Forest, Illinois, from 1964 to 1989. She received an honorary doctorate upon her retirement from Rosary College.

== Awards and honors ==
McCullough has received local, national and international distinctions throughout her artistic career. In 1961, she received the first prize at the Art Exhibit of Atlanta University (HBCU). Her first welded sculpture was presented in 1963 at the Century of Negro Progress Exposition in Chicago. Her work Phoenix, a 250-pound welded steel and copper sculpture, won the George D. Widener Gold Medal for Sculpture. Awarded by the Pennsylvania Academy of the Fine Arts in 1964 during their 159th annual exhibition, this distinction brought international attention to her artwork.

In 1967, McCullough was invited by Friendship Exchange to visit Moscow, Leningrad, Alma-Ata and Baku, Soviet Union, Iran, and Prague, Czechoslovakia.

In 1964, she was most notably distinguished with the George D. Widener Memorial Gold Medal for sculpture during the 159th Annual Exhibition of the Pennsylvania Academy of the Fine Arts which awarded her national and international recognition. Subsequently, she was invited by Friendship Exchange to visit Moscow, Lenningrad, Alma-Ata and Baku, Soviet Union, Iran, and Prague, Czechoslovakia. In 2000, she received the Oak Park (IL) Area Arts Council's Joseph Randall Shapiro Award in recognition of her significant contributions to the arts and was commissioned to design the Shapiro Award trophy.

Other awards and distinctions include the Basic Excellence Award, Art Institute of Chicago, Chicago, Illinois (1945); Purchase Award, Atlanta University, Atlanta, Georgia (1959); First prize at the Art Exhibit of Atlanta University (1961); First Prize, Chicago Art Institute Alumni (1968); Black Academy of Arts & Letters, New York, New York, Third Annual Awards (1972); ^{"}Sculptor of the Year", The Links, Incorporated, Washington, D.C (1974); Purchase Award, Johnson Museum, Cornell University, Ithaca, New York (1975); Outstanding Achievement Award, Y.W.C.A.Chicago, Illinois (1975), and the "Hard-Hat Award" for Monumental Sculpture, Illinois Arts Council—Art Week, Civic Center Plaza, Chicago, Illinois (1979).

== Death and legacy ==
McCullough died on December 15, 2008, at the age of 91, in her home in Oak Park, Illinois.

The artist's work is included in numerous private and public collections including Howard University, Washington, D.C.; Concordia College, River Forest, Illinois; The Oak Park River Forest Museum, Oakpark, Illinois; Oakland Museum of California, Oakland, California; Schenectady Museum, Schenectady, New York; DuSable Black History Museum and Education Center, Chicago, Illinois; and Muriel Ziek Foundation.
