= Wendell Phillips Academy High School =

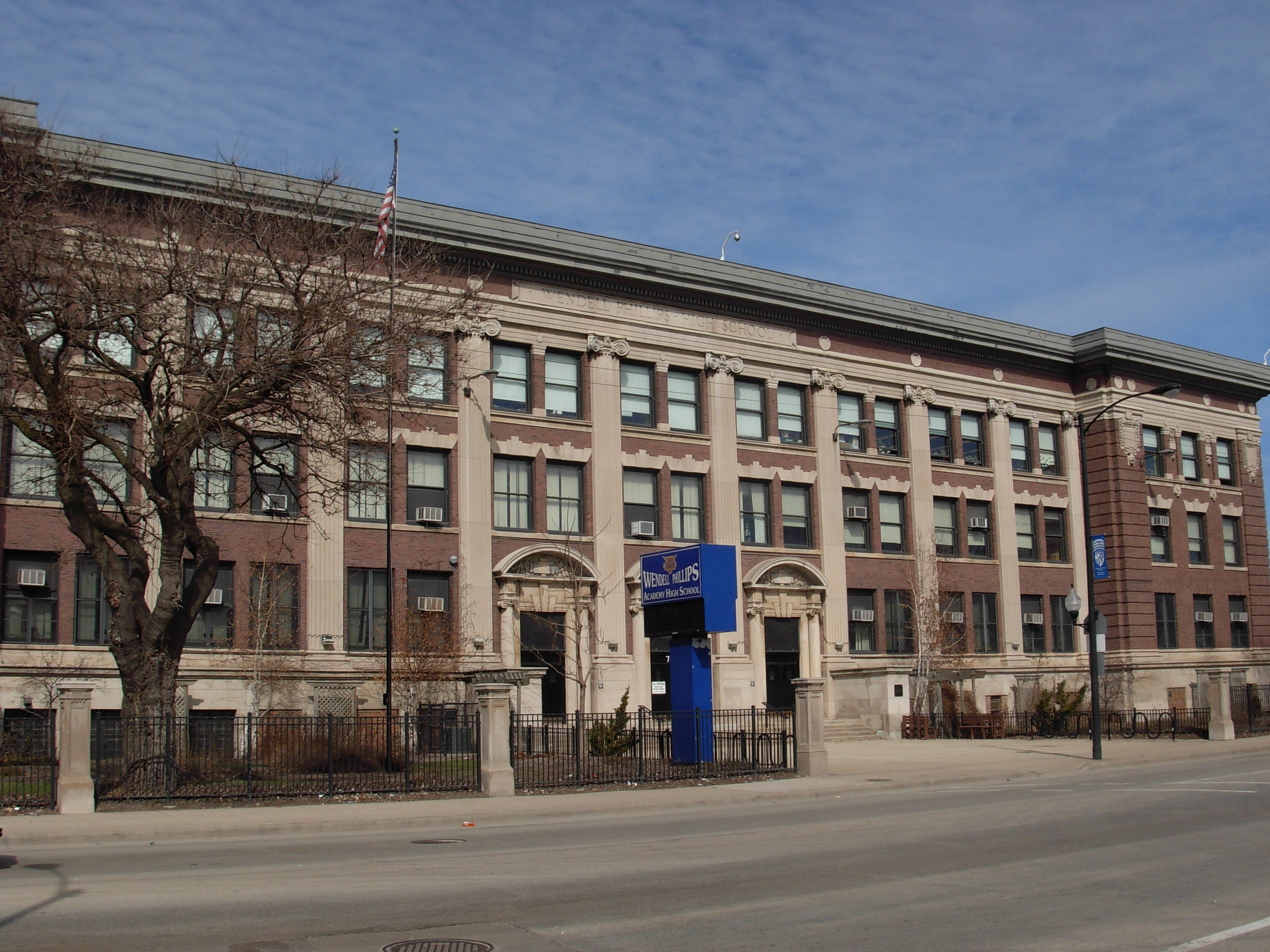

Location
- 244 East Pershing Road; Chicago, Illinois 60653; United States; 41°49′28″N 87°37′11″W

Information
- School type: Public; Secondary
- Motto: "The Premiere South Side School of Choice."
- Opened: September 4, 1904
- School district: Chicago Public Schools
- CEEB code: 141375
- NCES School ID: 170993001061
- Principal: Rashad J. Talley
- Grades: 9–12
- Gender: Coed
- Enrollment: 394 (2024–2025)
- Area: Urban
- Colors: Blue; White
- Athletics conference: Chicago Public League
- Team name: Wildcats
- Accreditation: North Central Association of Colleges and Schools
- Yearbook: Phillipsite
- Website: phillipshs.org

Wendell Phillips Academy High School is a public 4–year high school located in the Bronzeville neighborhood on the south side of Chicago, Illinois, United States. Opened in September 1904, Phillips is part of the Chicago Public Schools district and is managed by the Academy for Urban School Leadership. Phillips is named for the American abolitionist Wendell Phillips. Phillips is known as the first predominantly African-American high school in the City of Chicago. Phillips' building was designated a Chicago Landmark on May 7, 2003.

== History ==
The high school traces its history to 1875, when South Division High School was opened as the south side's first public high school. Phillips was established by Chicago Board of Education in 1900 to replace South Division, (which was located near 26th street and Wabash Avenue, about two miles from Phillips location) after community members petitioned for a new school due to the location being deemed "altogether unfit" and the need to provide a more modern building for the south side community. By 1903, the school was nearly complete and was scheduled to open in September of that year. Due to labor issues between August and December 1903, the last construction on the school was halted. Construction resumed in January 1904 and was completed by May 1904. Constructed in the Classical Revival style, Phillips was designed by architect William B. Mundie. Phillips opened for the 1904–1905 school year on September 4, 1904. The school was named for Wendell Phillips (1811–1884), the staunch abolitionist and advocate for Native Americans. He was one of the leading members of the American Anti-Slavery Society.

When its new Phillips campus opened in 1904, the school was still predominantly attended by the wealthy children of Chicago's south side mansions, but this soon changed. Changing demographics resulted from the Great Migration, by which millions of African Americans left the rural South for northern and midwestern industrial cities, including Chicago. By 1907, 90 black students had enrolled at Phillips. Early yearbooks portray a racial mix in the student body, but by 1920 the school had become Chicago's first predominantly African American high school. In 1924, the Chicago Board of Education created a junior high school within Phillips, serving seventh and eighth grades. By 1928, Phillips student population exceeded the capacity of the school building in which the district instituted the use of portable classrooms and the implementation of two half-day shifts.

In 1929, the Board of Education voted to build a new school in the Bronzeville neighborhood, naming it The New Wendell Phillips High School at 49th and Wabash Avenue due to overcrowding at Phillips. Economic conditions during the Great Depression slowed the work on the building; it was finally completed on February 4, 1935. Shortly before the completion of the new building, Phillips "mysteriously" caught fire on January 28, 1935, making it necessary for the students to move to the new school in February 1935. The new school was then named Jean Baptiste Point DuSable High School, after Chicago's first permanent non-native settler in April 1936. During the initial move to the new school, the board decided to only house sophomore, juniors and seniors in the new building due to limited space. The freshmen classes remained at the undamaged section of Phillips. A new wing was later built on the Phillips site in late–1936, serving as an elementary school after junior high schools in Chicago were discontinued in 1933.

The new wing included a new assembly hall, gymnasium, swimming pool, lunchroom, and chorus and band rooms. In November 1937, several classrooms in the new wing of the school caught fire before its initial completion, repairs were later made. During the 1940s, Phillips offered courses for adults which became known as Evening School. Phillips experienced overcrowding in the elementary wing of the school which led to a 20-classroom extension being built in 1944. By the early 1960s, Phillips students attended classes in three shifts due to overcrowding; estimated 2,200 students enrolled by 1964. The alumni association and principal Ernestine D. Curry established the Wendell Phillips High School Hall of Fame in 1979.

On Oct. 11, 2021, a 14-year-old female student and a security guard were shot and wounded on the school's campus. They were hospitalized with serious injuries. No articles found online can suggest that a suspect was caught for this attack.

== Other information ==
Phillips was used as the setting and shooting location for the movie Save the Last Dance, released in 2001.

=== The Savoy Big Five ===
During the late 1920s, members of the school's winning basketball team were drafted by Abe Saperstein, a Chicago Park District employee, to form the nucleus of a group that later became the Harlem Globetrotters. They were initially called "The Savoy Big Five," taking their new name from Bronzeville's Savoy Ballroom. Those players included Tommy Brookings, Hillery Brown, George Easter, William "Razor" Frazier, Roosevelt Hudson, Inman "Big Jack" Jackson, Lester Johnson, Byron "Fat" Long, William "Kid" Oliver, Al "Runt" Pullins, Randolph Ramsey, Ted Strong and Walter "Toots" Wright.

== Curriculum ==
Phillips is a High School Transformation and Advancement Via Individual Determination (AVID) school and offers Advanced Placement (AP) courses as well as honors courses as part of its academic curriculum. It provides a positive learning environment through an academic curriculum promoting literacy and inquiry-based learning. AP courses are offered in U.S. history, Biology, and English. Honors courses are offered in 15 subjects. Education To Careers (ETC) programs are offered in fashion design, graphic communications, and drafting. Phillips also features a Junior Air Force Reserve Officers Training Corps (JAFROTC) program and a health clinic to serve the needs of its students. Enrollment is open to students living in its attendance area; if space is available, students outside the area may apply.

=== Community partners ===
Phillips community and university partners include the University of Chicago, Illinois Institute of Technology, Ada S. McKinley Educational Talent Search, City Year Chicago, Dawson Skills Center, Carnegie Learning, Field Museum, Kaplan, Center for New Horizons, and Project Strive. In 2010, Phillips became a turnaround school in an effort to lower the school's one–year dropout rate of 66.8 percent. The school received the Spotlight on Technology award from the Chicago Public Schools leadership technology summit in 2013. The school's attendance boundary includes areas of the South Side, Chinatown, and portions of the Chicago Loop.

== Athletics ==
Phillips competes in the Chicago Public League (CPL) and is a member of the Illinois High School Association (IHSA). The schools sports teams are nicknamed Wildcats. Phillips athletic teams have had a history of success. The boys' basketball team won the state Class AA title in 1974–75 and city of Chicago champions in 1976. The boys' track and field team placed first in 1901–02, 1905–06, 1942–43, 1949–50, 1950–51 and 1961–62.

The girls' basketball team were regional champions in 2012–13. The 2014–15 Wildcats football team was the IHSA class 4A runner–up, making them the second CPS program and the first in 32 years to play in an IHSA football championship game. In the 2015–16 season, Phillips returned to the 4A finals and defeated Belleville Althoff 51–7 to become the first Chicago public league team to win a state championship in football, and for the second time in three years, they became the state champions again in 2017 in the 5A division, defeating Dunlap 33–7.

== Notable alumni ==
* Pastor T. L. Barrett (attended) — minister and gospel recording artist.
- Vytautas Andrius Graičiūnas — Lithuanian American management theorist, management consultant, and engineer, and was a known expert in his field.
- Jahleel Billingsley (2019) — football player
- Timuel Black (attended) — Historian and civil rights activist.
- Gwendolyn Brooks (attended) — author, first African American to win the Pulitzer Prize
- Hillery Brown — professional basketball player
- Archibald Carey, Jr (1926) — lawyer, judge, politician, diplomat and clergyman
- Jodie Christian (attended) — jazz musician
- Floy Clements — first Black woman to become a state legislator in Illinois
- Darius Clemons (1978) — basketball player
- Nat "King" Cole (attended) — singer, musician and recording star in Rock and Roll Hall of Fame.
- Sam Cooke (attended) — Soul and gospel recording star in Rock and Roll Hall of Fame.
- Earl B. Dickerson (attended) — attorney and business executive.
- Osiris Eldridge (2006) — professional basketball player.
- Mary G. Evans (attended) — minister, who served as pastor of Chicago's Cosmopolitan Community Church from 1932 until 1966.
- Wilson Frost (1943) — politician, Chicago alderman
- Marla Gibbs (1949) — Emmy Award-winning actress, singer and comedian (The Jeffersons, 227).
- Lucius Perry Gregg, Jr. — fourth African American to graduate from United States Naval Academy, the first with honors; first African American to receive a graduate degree in Engineering from Massachusetts Institute of Technology; first African American Dean of Science (Associate) from a major university, Northwestern University
- Alvin Hall — former NFL player
- Carl "Buster" Smith — former checkers player
- Doug Roby — American football, baseball, squash player
- Vivian G. Harsh (1909) — Librarian and historian, noted as the Chicago Public Library (CPL) system's first African American librarian.
- Bernie Hayes — broadcast journalist.
- Herbie Hancock (attended) — jazz musician.
- Chris Hinton — NFL player, Baltimore Colts, Atlanta Falcons and Minnesota Vikings
- Milt Hinton — jazz musician.
- Paul Des Jardien — member of College Football Hall of Fame
- George E. Johnson, Sr. (attended) — businessman, founder, Johnson Products, the first African American owned company listed on American Stock Exchange
- John H. Johnson (attended) — founder of Johnson Publishing Company (Ebony, Jet), and the first African-American on the Forbes list of the richest 400 Americans.
- George Kirby — comedian, actor and singer.
- Gerri Major (1912) — journalist, editor and author.
- Billy Martin — former professional NFL halfback
- Ira Murchison (1951) — sprinter, gold medalist at 1956 Olympic Games.
- Lee Roy Murphy (attended) — professional boxer.
- Larry Murray (1971) — MLB professional baseball player (New York Yankees, Oakland Athletics).
- Ray Nance — jazz trumpeter.
- Guy Ousley (attended) — Negro league shortstop.
- Alonzo S. Parham — second African American to attend West Point
- Polo G (attended) – rapper.
- Mike Pruitt (1972) — NFL player, first round seventh overall pick in the 1976 NFL draft (Cleveland Browns).
- Al Pullins – original member of Harlem Globetrotters
- Ted Double Duty Radcliffe (1920) — member of Baseball Hall of Fame
- William Clintard "Bill" Robinzine (1971) — NBA basketball player (1975–1982).
- Charles Skyles, state legislator in Illinois
- Dinah Washington (attended) — singer, recording artist in Rock and Roll Hall of Fame.
- Mary T. Washington — the first African-American woman CPA
- Frances Cress Welsing — psychiatrist, author of The Isis Papers: The Keys to the Colors
- Steven Williams (attended) — actor.
- Claude "Buddy" Young — Pro Football Hall of Famer, the first African-American executive hired by a major sports league (NFL).

== Notable staff ==
- Maudelle B. Bousfield (1885–1971) educator and school administrator, (principal of Phillips from 1939 until 1950) noted as the first African–African to serve as principal in a Chicago public school.
- Captain Walter Dyett (1901–1969) violinist and assistant music instructor at the school.
- Mildred Bryant Jones (1887–1966) musician, educator, and first African-American director of music Wendell Phillips.
- Geraldine McCullough (1917–2008), sculptor, painter; taught art

== Notable principals ==
Below is a list of individuals that have served as principal of Wendell Phillips Academy High School since the opening of the school in 1904.

- Spencer R. Smith (1904–1917)
- Charles H. Perrine (1917–1921)
- Albert W. Evans (1921–1926)
- Chauncey C. Willard (1926–1935)
- William H. Page (1935–1937)
- William Abrams (1937–1939)
- Maudelle B. Bousfield (1939–1950)
- Virginia F. Lewis (1950–1961)
- Robert E. Lewis (1961–1965)
- Alonzo A. Crim (1965–1968)
- William Finch (1968–1971)
- Daniel W. Caldwell (1971–1975)
- Ernestine D. Curry (1975–1990)
- Juanita T. Tucker (1990–1997)
- Beverly LaCoste (1997–2001)
- Bertha Buchanan (2002–2004)
- Euel Bunton (2004–2010)
- Terrence A. Little (2010)
- Devon Q. Horton (2010–2014)
- Matthew G. Sullivan (2014–2021)
- Virag C. Nanavati (2021–2022)
- Rashad J. Talley (2022–present)
