= Mary T. Washington =

African-American accountant

- Mary T. Washington Wylie, from a 1978 magazine
- Born: Mary Thelma Morrison; April 21, 1906; Vicksburg, Mississippi
- Died: July 2, 2005 (aged 99); Chicago, Illinois
- Other name: Mary T. Washington Wylie
- Occupation: Accountant

Mary T. Washington (April 21, 1906 – July 2, 2005) was the first African-American woman to be a certified public accountant in the United States.

== Early life and education ==
Mary Thelma Morrison was born in Vicksburg, Mississippi, to Daisy and William Morrison. Her father was a carpenter, and her mother died when she was only 6 years old. Following her mother’s death, Washington was raised by her grandparents in Chicago. She excelled as a math student at Wendell Phillips High School. She earned her bachelor's degree in business from Northwestern University in 1941 and was the only woman in her graduating class to earn a business degree.

== Career ==
During college, Washington worked at Chicago's Douglas National Bank. After graduation, she moved into a new position at Binga State Bank, one of the city's prominent black-owned businesses in the 1920s. Arthur Wilson, the second African-American CPA in the United States, trained her.

Due to sexism and racism at the time, she could not get hired. In 1939, she founded Mary T. Washington & Co., an accounting firm providing businesses and individuals with accounting and tax services. Washington joined with one of her protégés to form the firm of Washington & Pittman in 1968. With the addition of a third partner, Lester McKeever, the firm became known as Washington, Pittman & McKeever, LLC, in 1976. Through her time at the firm, she trained a generation of younger black CPAs. She is credited with helping Chicago to develop the nation's "highest concentration" of Black CPAs. In Chicago she was active in Black women's clubs and events. She retired from the accounting firm in 1985.

== Personal life and legacy ==
Her marriage to Seymour Washington ended in divorce. She later married Donald Melvin Wylie. She had a daughter named Barbara with Seymour, and a son named Donald Wylie Jr with Donald. In addition, Mary and Donald adopted other children. Washington died July 2, 2005, at age 99, in Chicago. She was survived by her 5 children and her grandchildren. The Illinois CPA Society and the CPA Endowment Fund of Illinois established the Mary T. Washington Wylie Opportunity Fund in her name to support diversity in the accounting profession. In 1978, she won the Fred Hampton Scholarship Fund Image Award.

The City of Chicago officially declared September 30, 2018 Mary T. Washington Wylie Day throughout the city. The official proclamation, signed by Mayor Rahm Emanuel, coincided with the display of light post banners in Chicago’s Loop (LaSalle St. from Jackson to Adams and on Jackson Blvd. from Wells to Clark) provided by the Illinois CPA Society, to mark the occasion and honor a true pioneer in the accounting profession.
