= Mike Novak =

American basketball player (1915–1978)

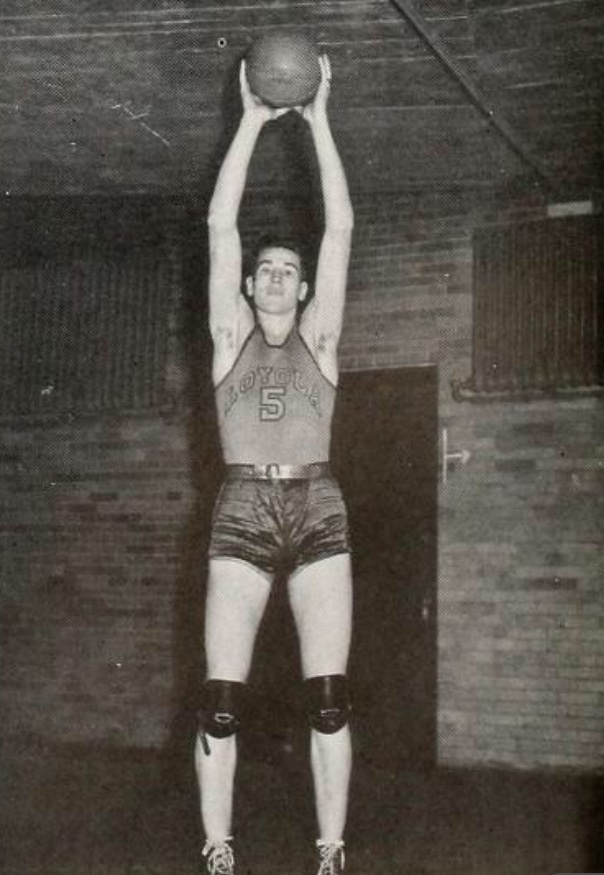
- Novak from the 1937 Loyolan

Personal information
- Born: April 23, 1915 Chicago, Illinois, U.S.
- Died: August 15, 1978 (aged 63) Red Creek, New York, U.S.
- Listed height: 6 ft 9 in (2.06 m)
- Listed weight: 219 lb (99 kg)

Career information
- High school: Tilden (Chicago, Illinois)
- College: Loyola Chicago (1936–1939)
- Playing career: 1939–1954
- Position: Center / power forward
- Number: 18, 19, 6

Career history
- 1939–1942: Chicago Bruins
- 1942–1943: Chicago Studebaker Flyers
- 1943–1946: Sheboygan Red Skins
- 1946–1948: Syracuse Nationals
- 1948–1949: Rochester Royals
- 1949–1950: Philadelphia Warriors
- 1950–1951: Louisville Alumnites
- 1954: Syracuse Nationals

Career highlights
- All-NBL Second Team (1946); Consensus second-team All-American (1939); Second-team All-American – Converse (1938)
- Stats at NBA.com
- Stats at Basketball Reference

Michael Donald Novak (April 23, 1915 – August 15, 1978) was an American professional basketball player. He played in the NBL, BAA, and NBA from 1939 to 1954. A 6'9" center from Loyola University Chicago, he was one of the first prominent "big men" to play professional basketball, averaging 8.5 points per game over the course of his career as a member of the Chicago Bruins, Chicago Studebaker Flyers, Sheboygan Red Skins, Syracuse Nationals, Rochester Royals, and Philadelphia Warriors.

Novak was the seventh-highest scorer in the history of the 12-season NBL. Some of his greatest seasons came during his middle years, with the Sheboygan Red Skins. He joined the team in 1943–44, played in all 22 games and helped Sheboygan to a 14–8 record, good for second place in the four-team league. He scored 92 points during the regular season. In the playoffs, Sheboygan advanced to the NBL finals opposite the Fort Wayne Zollner Pistons, who won the title.

In 1944–45, Novak teamed with 6-7 forward Eddie Dancker to form the league's best 1-2 punch in the middle. He increased his scoring to 233 points in 27 games, and Western Division champion Sheboygan (19–11) again advanced to the finals to play Fort Wayne. The Red Skins won the first two games of the best-of-five series, only to get swept in the next three.

The following season, Novak was named a second-team choice on the all-league team. He scored 310 points in 34 games for Hall of Famer Dutch Dehnert's Red Skins, who won the Western Division title with a 21–13 record and advanced to the NBL championship series against the powerful Rochester Royals, who included Hall of Famers Al Cervi, Bob Davies and Red Holzman. Rochester, which would win the NBA championship five years later, swept Sheboygan for the title.

After only three games in 1946–47, Novak was dealt to the Syracuse Nationals. Doxie Moore had replaced Dehnert as Sheboygan's head coach.

Novak scored 2,281 points in nine NBL seasons, 320 in one BAA season and 100 in two NBA seasons.

== BAA/NBA career statistics ==
Legend
| GP | Games played | MPG | Minutes per game |
| FG% | Field-goal percentage | FT% | Free-throw percentage |
| RPG | Rebounds per game | APG | Assists per game |
| PPG | Points per game | **Bold** | Career high |

=== Regular season ===
| Year | Team | GP | MPG | FG% | FT% | RPG | APG | PPG |
|---|---|---|---|---|---|---|---|---|
| 1948–49 | Rochester | **60** | – | **.342** | .581 | – | **1.9** | **5.3** |
| 1949–50 | Rochester | 5 | – | .091 | **1.000** | – | .8 | .6 |
| 1949–50 | Philadelphia | 55 | – | .261 | .522 | – | 1.0 | 1.7 |
| 1953–54 | Syracuse | 5 | **4.8** | .000 | .500 | **.4** | .4 | .2 |
| Career | | 125 | 4.8 | .310 | .566 | .4 | 1.4 | 3.4 |

=== Playoffs ===
| Year | Team | GP | MPG | FG% | FT% | RPG | APG | PPG |
|---|---|---|---|---|---|---|---|---|
| 1949 | Rochester | 4 | – | .273 | 1.000 | – | 2.5 | 3.3 |
| Career | | 4 | – | .273 | 1.000 | – | 2.5 | 3.3 |
