= Bernie Price =

American basketball player

Personal information
- Born: September 20, 1915 Toledo, Ohio, U.S.
- Died: November 7, 2011 (aged 96) Chicago, Illinois, U.S.
- Listed height: 6 ft 3 in (1.91 m)
- Listed weight: 180 lb (82 kg)

Career information
- High school: Libbey (Toledo, Ohio)
- Position: Power forward / center

Career history
- 1934–1942: Harlem Globetrotters
- 1942–1943: Chicago Studebaker Flyers
- 1943–1952: Harlem Globetrotters
- 1947–1948: Seattle Athletics

Bernard Burnice Price (September 20, 1915 – January 24, 2002) was an American professional basketball player. He played for the Harlem Globetrotters for many years. He also played for the Chicago Studebaker Flyers in the National Basketball League (NBL) during the 1942–43 season and averaged 9.0 points per game.

His younger brother, Al Price, also played for the Globetrotters and in the NBL.
