= Roosie Hudson =

American basketball player

Personal information
- Born: July 15, 1915 Mississippi
- Died: February 1, 1985 (aged 69) Chicago, Illinois
- Listed height: 6 ft 0 in (1.83 m)
- Listed weight: 160 lb (73 kg)

Career information
- High school: Wendell Phillips (Chicago, Illinois)
- College: Morris Brown
- Playing career: 1936–1947
- Position: Guard

Career history
- 1936–1942: Harlem Globetrotters
- 1942–1943: Chicago Studebaker Flyers
- 1946–1947: Chicago Monarchs

Roosevelt "Roosie" Hudson (July 15, 1915 – February 1, 1985) was an American professional basketball player. He played for the Chicago Studebaker Flyers in the National Basketball League for one season. He also played for the Harlem Globetrotters for a total of seven seasons.
