= Duke Cumberland =

American basketball player (1913–1966)

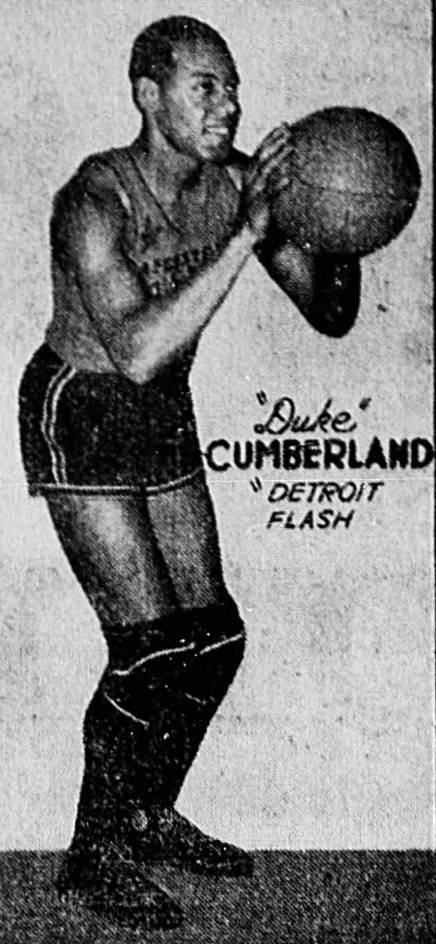
- Cumberland, circa 1945

Personal information
- Born: 1913
- Died: October 23, 1966 (aged 52–53) Toledo, Ohio, U.S.
- Listed height: 6 ft 2 in (1.88 m)
- Listed weight: 190 lb (86 kg)

Career information
- High school: Scott (Toledo, Ohio)
- College: Knoxville
- Position: Forward

Career history
- 1935–1936: Toledo's Brown Bombers
- 1936–1939: Jesse Owens Collegians
- 1938–1942: Harlem Globetrotters
- 1941–1943: New York Rens
- 1942–1943: Chicago Studebaker Flyers
- 1943–1946: Harlem Globetrotters
- 1945–1947: New York Rens
- 1946–1947: Columbus Collegians
- 1947: Dayton Metropolitans
- 1948–1949: Dayton Rens
- 1949–1952: Harlem Globetrotters

Roscoe Franklin "Duke" Cumberland (1913 – October 23, 1966) was a member of the Harlem Globetrotters. He averaged 6.9 points per game in the National Basketball League for the Chicago Studebaker Flyers.

== See also ==
- The Harlem Globetrotters (film)
