= Hillery Brown =

American basketball player (1912–1991)

Personal information
- Born: July 30, 1912 Jackson, Mississippi
- Died: February 8, 1991 (aged 78) Chicago, Illinois
- Listed height: 6 ft 3 in (1.91 m)
- Listed weight: 190 lb (86 kg)

Career information
- High school: Wendell Phillips (Chicago, Illinois)
- Playing career: 1942–1943
- Position: Forward / guard

Career history
- 1942–1943: Chicago Studebaker Flyers

Hillery L. Brown (July 30, 1912 – February 8, 1991) was an American professional basketball player. Brown played for one season in the National Basketball League for the Chicago Studebaker Flyers, averaging 4.1 points per game.
