= Sonny Boswell =

American basketball player

Personal information
- Born: May 19, 1919 Greenville, Mississippi, U.S.
- Died: October 19, 1964 (aged 45) Chicago, Illinois, U.S.
- Listed height: 6 ft 1 in (1.85 m)
- Listed weight: 180 lb (82 kg)

Career information
- High school: Scott (Toledo, Ohio)
- Position: Guard

Career history
- 1937–1938: Jesse Owens Olympians
- 1938–1941: Harlem Globetrotters
- 1941–1943: New York Rens
- 1942–1943: Chicago Studebaker Flyers
- 1943–1944: Harlem Globetrotters
- 1944–1945: New York Rens
- 1945–1946: Chicago Monarchs
- 1945–1946: Anderson Chiefs
- 1946–1947: Dayton Mets
- 1947–1948: Ciralsky Meat Packers

Career highlights
- All-NBL Second Team (1943)
- Basketball Hall of Fame

Wyatt "Sonny" Boswell (May 19, 1919 – October 19, 1964) was an early African American professional basketball player. He was born in Greenville, Mississippi and grew up in Toledo, Ohio, where he attended Scott High School. He played for the Harlem Globetrotters from 1939 to 1941 and again from 1943 to 1944.

Boswell was known for taking long distance trick shots to entertain the fans. Abe Saperstein, the manager of the Globetrotters, described Boswell as "one of the great long shot artists of his day". In 1940, Boswell was named MVP of the World Professional Basketball Tournament after scoring eleven points in the Globetrotters' 31–29 championship win over the Chicago Bruins.

During the 1942–43 season, Boswell played for the Chicago Studebaker Flyers of the National Basketball League. He was one of a group of former Harlem Globetrotters who joined the previously all-white NBL to replace players who had recently been drafted for World War II. He later became the only African American player in the league's history to be named a member of an All-NBL Team following the season's conclusion. Over the years, Boswell also appeared in games for the New York Renaissance and the Chicago Monarchs.

After his basketball career, Boswell settled in Chicago, where he managed the Pershing Hotel and later owned his own bowling alley, called Sonny Boswell's South Park Bowl. He died of a heart attack at age 45 in 1964. Boswell would eventually be honored posthumously into the Naismith Basketball Hall of Fame in 2022 for his playing days.
