= Babe Pressley =

American basketball player

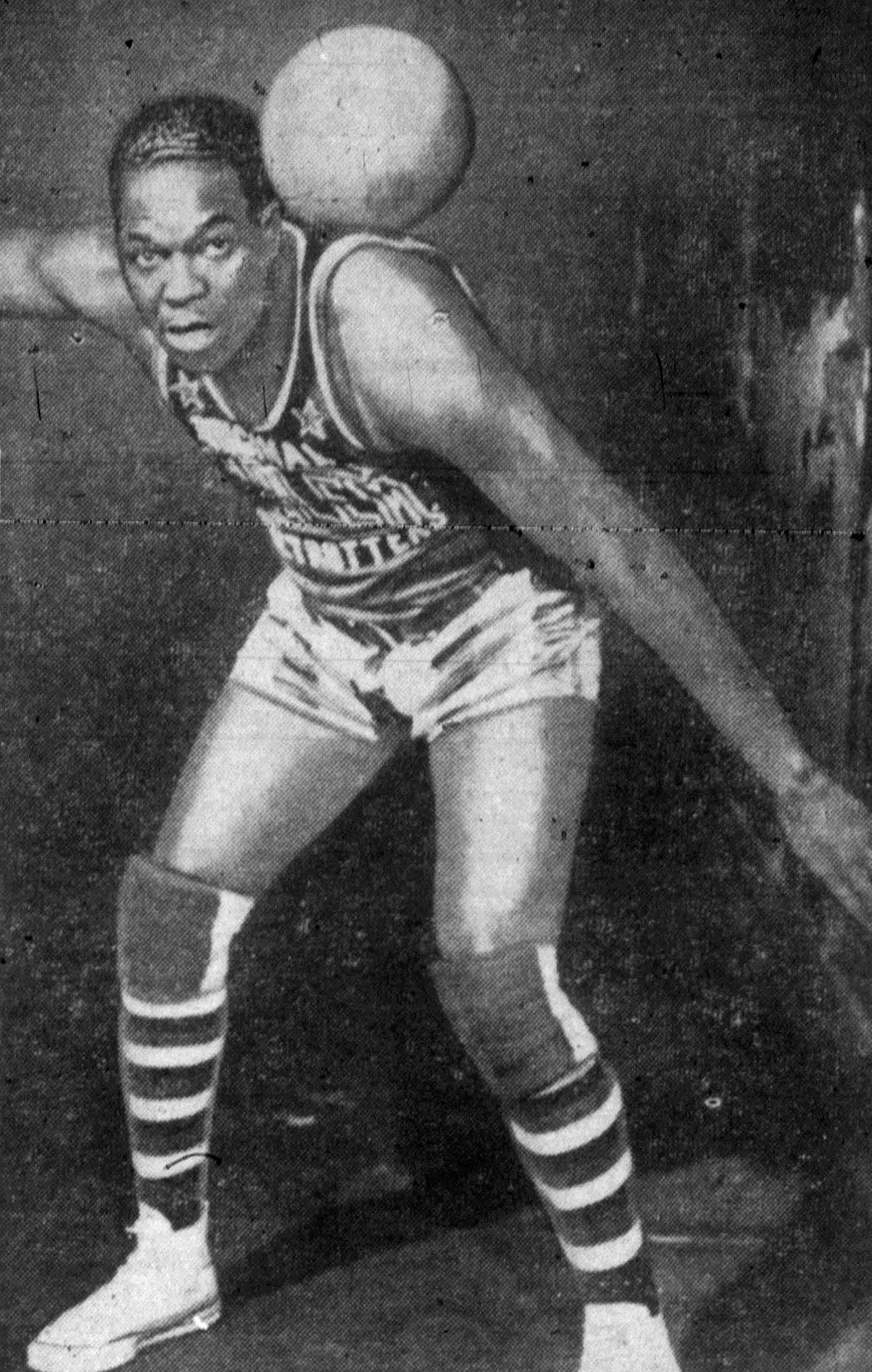
- Pressley, circa 1954

Personal information
- Born: September 21, 1916
- Died: September 15, 1965 (aged 48) Cleveland, Ohio
- Listed height: 6 ft 2 in (1.88 m)
- Listed weight: 195 lb (88 kg)

Career information
- High school: Central (Cleveland, Ohio)
- Playing career: 1936–1946
- Position: Guard

Career history
- 1936: Cleveland Penzoil
- 1936–1939: Jesse Owens Collegians
- 1937–1942: Harlem Globetrotters
- 1942–1943: New York Rens
- 1943: Chicago Studebaker Flyers
- 1943: Cleveland Buckeyes
- 1943–1954: Harlem Globetrotters
- 1945–1946: Chicago Monarchs

Louis "Babe" Pressley (1916–1965) was an American professional basketball player. He played in the National Basketball League for the Chicago Studebaker Flyers. He was also a long-time player for the Harlem Globetrotters. Pressley signed with the Globetrotters in 1937 until 1958. Pressley was key in double teaming George Mikan, when the Globetrotters beat the Lakers. He was inducted into the Cleveland Hall of Fame in 1976. Pressley was recognized as an athletic great in an article concerning Abe Saperstein.
