= Hillary Brown =

American architect

Hillary Brown is an American architect, and professor at City College of New York. She is a fellow of the American Institute of Architects. She won a Berlin Prize.

== Life ==
She graduated from Oberlin College and Yale University. As assistant commissioner at New York City's Department of Design and Construction, Brown founded the Office of Sustainable Design in 1996. While working for New York City's Department of Design and Construction, the firm published the City of New York's High Performance Building Guidelines in Spring of 1999. Brown is founding principal of the firm New Civic Works. She is a member of the National Academy of Construction.

Her work appeared in Places Journal.

== Works ==
- Infrastructural Ecologies: Alternative Development Models in Emerging Economies. MIT Press, 2017.
- Next Generation Infrastructure: Principles for Post-Industrial Public Works. Island Press, 2014.
- Co-Author, Managing Editor. High Performance Infrastructure Guidelines, City of New York, 2005.
- Co-Author. State and Local Government Green Building Toolkit, U.S. Green Building Council, 2002.
- Co-Author, Managing Editor. High Performance Building Guidelines, City of New York, 1999.
