= Tony Peyton =

American professional basketball player

Personal information
- Born: March 3, 1921 Elyria, Ohio, U.S.
- Died: July 23, 2007 (aged 86) Midland, Texas, U.S.
- Listed height: 6 ft 2 in (1.88 m)
- Listed weight: 200 lb (91 kg)

Career information
- High school: Scott (Toledo, Ohio)
- College: Michigan (1938–1941)
- Playing career: 1941–195?
- Position: Small forward / shooting guard

Career history
- 1941–1942: Harlem Globetrotters
- 1942–1943: Chicago Studebaker Flyers
- 1944–1946: Harlem Globetrotters
- 1945–1946: Kansas City Stars
- 1946–1951: Chicago Colored Collegians
- 1951–195?: New York Renaissance

Charles Anthony Peyton (March 3, 1921 – July 23, 2007) was an American professional basketball player. He played for the Chicago Studebaker Flyers in the National Basketball League during the 1942–43 season and averaged 2.4 points per game. He also played for barnstorming teams such as the Harlem Globetrotters and New York Renaissance.
