= Chicago Studebaker Flyers =

American basketball team (1942–1943)

The Chicago Studebaker Flyers (also known as the Chicago Studebakers) were a National Basketball League team from 1942 to 1943. They were funded by the United Auto Workers and replaced George Halas's Chicago Bruins, who folded in 1942.

During the 1942–1943 NBL season, the Studebakers and the Toledo Jim White Chevrolets became the first teams in the league to racially integrate. The Studebakers did so by signing six former Harlem Globetrotters: Tony Peyton, Duke Cumberland, Bernie Price, Sonny Boswell, Roosie Hudson, and Hillery Brown. Though some claimed that the former Globetrotters experienced racism from their white teammates, coach Johnny Jordan insisted that "there was no strife", adding, "All the blacks were treated well by players and fans. People knew the Globetrotters were great ballplayers. They were well received." The franchise would later compete in the 1943 World Professional Basketball Tournament as the South Bend Studebaker Champions before folding operations for good after only one season of play following a bad practice session involving Mike Novak and Sonny Boswell.

There's a misconception that the Studebaker Flyers are the rebranded version of the Chicago Bruins when the Studebakers only took on the open team spot for the NBL following the Bruins' folding and departure from the NBL. Another, much larger misconception relating to the Bruins and Studebaker Flyers involved the notion that they later became the Cleveland Chase Brassmen and then the Cleveland Allmen Transfers after the Studebakers folded operations as a franchise, with the latter team later becoming the Syracuse Nationals, with that team eventually becoming the present-day Philadelphia 76ers in the National Basketball Association.
