= 1936–37 Dayton London Bobbys season =

MBC professional basketball team season

- Division champions
- League: Midwest Basketball Conference
- Head coach: Bob McConachie
- Owner(s): Miami Valley Brewing Company
- Arena: Montgomery County Fairgrounds Coliseum

Results
- Record: 8–6 (.571)
- Place: Division: 1st (Western)
- Playoff finish: Lost MBC Division Playoffs to Fort Wayne General Electrics, 2–1

The 1936–37 Dayton London Bobbys season was technically the only professional basketball season of play for the Dayton London Bobbys franchise under that name when playing in the second and final season of the Midwest Basketball Conference (MBC), which was also the second and final year that league existed before it technically folded operations because the MBC rebranded itself into the United States' National Basketball League (NBL) for its following season of play. However, they previously played in the MBC's inaugural season as the Dayton Metropolitans, with this also being the team's official second season of play after their previous team owners, the Dayton Metropolitan Clothing Store, sold their franchise to the Miami Valley Brewing Company and renamed the team to the Dayton London Bobbys after the London Bobby alcoholic drink in question. Twelve teams competed in the MBC this time around, six teams in each of the Eastern Division (though it originally started out as five teams in that division at first) and the Western Division (including Dayton and the inaugural, defending champion Chicago Duffy Florals).

Throughout this entire season, the Western Division of the MBC would not be as strong as the best teams of the Eastern Division this season (which were the two works teams based in nearby Akron, Ohio). However, the Dayton London Bobbys would end up being the best team out of every other team in the Western Division this time around due to the fact that Dayton's squad was the only team in their division this season to have a winning record at all with an 8–6 record. Because of that, the Dayton squad would end up qualifying for the reformatted MBC Playoffs, with the London Bobbys going up against the newly added Fort Wayne General Electrics works team (who finished their season in the Western Division with an average 6–6 record, while every other team in their division, including the inaugural (controversial) champion Chicago Duffy Florals, finished their season with a losing season by comparison) for a shot at winning the second MBC championship ever held over one of the two Akron squads in the Eastern Division. In the newly created Western Division Playoffs for the MBC Playoffs, both Dayton and Fort Wayne would split the first two games played in that series before Dayton surprised Fort Wayne close to a half-hour before playing the deciding third and final game of the playoff series by having coach Bob McConachie calling Fort Wayne's head coach, Ray Lindemuth, to let him know that the Dayton London Bobbys were going to forfeit Game 3 of the series (and by extension, the entire playoff series) to the General Electrics team for a reason that was ultimately unknown due to McConachie hanging up on Lindemuth before answering why the forfeit was considered necessary; outroars on having the team be expelled from the newly created league and forfeit their $500 entry fee into the MBC were also brought up afterward, though nothing would come out of this scenario during this season. To this day, in modern-day basketball's history when connecting the MBC's history to the NBA, Dayton's Game 3 forfeit to Fort Wayne was the only true playoff game to ever be forfeited in the sport of basketball (though there would be equivalents in the revived American Basketball League when the original Baltimore Bullets forfeited the championship series to the Trenton Tigers without playing a game due to scheduling conflicts and in the American Basketball Association's inaugural season when the fourth place tiebreaker match between the Kentucky Colonels and the New Jersey Americans would be forfeited in favor of Kentucky due to awful playing conditions for the court on that tiebreaker match's game night, as well as one close call during the 2020 NBA Bubble period). Following the season's conclusion, the Midwest Basketball Conference would revamp itself into the National Basketball League, which eventually became a league that would merge with the future rivaling Basketball Association of America to become the National Basketball Association for the present-day era, with the London Bobbys renaming themselves back into the Dayton Metropolitans once again by that point in time after the Miami Valley Brewing Company sold off their original shares and gave them back to the Dayton Metropolitan Clothing Store. This season was also notable for featuring future NBL star player Leroy Edwards, who had previously played for the MBC's Indianapolis U.S. Tires team alongside Charley Shipp in its inaugural season of play before eventually playing for the Oshkosh All-Stars in the NBL for the rest of his career not long afterward; Edwards and Shipp would end up being the only two players in MBC/NBL history to play throughout all fourteen seasons of that league's combined existence before it eventually merged with the BAA to become the NBA in 1949.

== Roster ==
Due to information on Midwest Basketball Conference players being generally hard to find, there are bound to be more gaps and/or inaccuracies found in certain areas on the team's roster spots (specifically on player birth dates, heights, weights, and even what schools they might have last come out of at the time) than usual.

Player	Position
Carl Austing	F-C
Bobby Colburn	G-F
Leroy Edwards	C-F
Bill Hosket Sr.	C
Phil Liehr	F-C
Larry McAfee	G-F
Gene Mechling	G
Bud Moodler	G-F
Max Padlow	G-F
Bob Rowlands	G-F
Leo Sack	G
Hugh Salisbury	G
Charles Stenken	G
Ernie Talos	G-F
Norm Wagner	C
John Wiethe	G-F

Note: Dayton's playoff roster for this season includes Carl Austing, Bobby Colburn, Gene Mechling, Leo Sack, Ernie Talos, Norm Wagner, and John Wiethe. Not only that, but there was also a player who had the last names of Stemki who was also on the roster at one point in time as well.

== MBC Standings ==
=== MBC Eastern Division ===
Pos.	Eastern Division	Wins	Losses	Win %
1	Akron Goodyear Wingfoots	16	2	.889
2	Akron Firestone Non-Skids	13	5	.722
3	Warren HyVis Oils	8	6	.571
4	Columbus Athletic Supply	6	5	.545
5	Detroit Altes Lagers	2	8	.200
6	Pittsburgh Y.M.H.A.	2	9	.182

=== MBC Western Division ===
Pos.	Western Division	Wins	Losses	Win %
1	Dayton London Bobbys	8	6	.571
2	Fort Wayne General Electrics	6	6	.500
3	Whiting Ciesar All-Americans	3	5	.375
4	Chicago Duffy Florals	4	7	.364
5	Indianapolis Kautskys	2	5	.286
6	Indianapolis U.S. Tires	3	9	.250

== MBC Playoffs ==
=== MBC Western Division Playoffs ===
(W1) Dayton London Bobbys vs. (W2) Fort Wayne General Electrics: Fort Wayne win series 2–1

- Game 1 @ Dayton: Dayton 36, Fort Wayne 25
- Game 2 @ Fort Wayne: Fort Wayne 31, Dayton 28
- Game 3 @ Fort Wayne: Dayton forfeits both the game and the series to Fort Wayne for some unknown reason. As such, the final score for this game is officially labeled as 2–0 favoring Fort Wayne.

This marked the only time in the MBC/NBL's history where a team would forfeit a playoff game for unknown reasons.
