= 1937–38 Fort Wayne General Electrics season =

NBL professional basketball team season

- Head coach: Byron Evard (player-coach)
- Owner: General Electric
- Arena: Fort Wayne General Electric Gymnasium; North Side High School Gymnasium

Results
- Record: 13–7 (.650)
- Place: Division: 3rd (Western)
- Playoff finish: Did not qualify

The 1937–38 Fort Wayne General Electrics season was the first (and technically only) professional basketball season of play for the Fort Wayne General Electrics in the city of Fort Wayne, Indiana under the National Basketball League, which officially was the first season that it existed as a professional basketball league after previously existing as a semi-pro or amateur basketball league called the Midwest Basketball Conference in its first two seasons back in 1935. However, if you include the time when they joined the Midwest Basketball Conference in its second and final season of existence, this would officially be considered at least their second season of existence as a team, with their team slated to have lasted for as long as 1926 to have them play for at least eleven seasons by this point in time instead. The General Electrics team in Fort Wayne were one of nine MBC teams from the previous season (one of ten overall MBC teams if you include the original Buffalo Bisons NBL team) to join the inaugural NBL season as it rebranded itself from the MBC to the NBL professional basketball league, with the Richmond King Clothiers / Cincinnati Comellos, Kankakee Gallagher Trojans, and the Oshkosh All-Stars (the last team by December 1937) being the only non-MBC teams joining the NBL for this season. Not only that, but they also were one of seven teams to compete in the Western Division this season, with them representing thirteen inaugural NBL teams to compete in the first season under the NBL name, comprising six teams competing in the Eastern Division and seven teams competing in the Western Division.

In terms of number of wins acquired during this season, the General Electrics squad would get the most victories out of any team competing in the Western Division this season, with their 13 wins (including the two wins by forfeit over both the Columbus Athletic Supply team and the Cincinnati Comellos) topping the next two teams in their division, the Oshkosh All-Stars and Whiting Ciesar All-Americans, as well as tying the eventual inaugural NBL champions in the Akron Goodyear Wingfoots and being behind only the Akron Firestone Non-Skids for the number of wins this season. However, the Fort Wayne squad would be the only team to actually utilize the original plan the NBL had for the season in playing 20 scheduled games for the inaugural season (every other team would end up playing a varied, yet fewer number of games there by comparison, ranging from nine to eighteen total games played on their ends, with them playing four games for a 3–1 record before the Oshkosh All-Stars played a single game in the NBL by January 1938), which later turned out to be a detriment for their standings in the Western Division, as the 7 losses they had to coincide with the 13 wins they got ultimately led to the General Electrics team finishing the season with a third-place finish. While a third-place finish would normally be enough to get a playoff spot in a modern-day setting, the inaugural NBL setting only had the top two teams from each division competing against each other in the inaugural NBL Playoffs, meaning the General Electrics squad would only barely miss out on making it to the first ever NBL Playoffs due to a worse team percentage than the other two teams in their division. Following this season's conclusion, the General Electrics would drop out of the NBL altogether (being one of six teams to do so, as well as them being the only winning team to exit out of the NBL after this season's conclusion) due to a combination of sunk costs and the feeling that playing NBL games would distract workers away from their actual jobs at the General Electric business operating in Fort Wayne. However, this season didn't prove to be the last season ever shown for their overall existence, as two years after the conclusion of World War II, when athletic workers wanted to get back into the sporting world once again, the Fort Wayne workers in General Electric decided to reignite the Fort Wayne General Electrics team into a newly established workers-based basketball league called the National Industrial Basketball League that also included another NBL team from this season in the Akron Goodyear Wingfoots (who had eventually left the NBL themselves due to World War II's growing presence in 1942) as competition there. With that in mind, when entering the NIBL's inaugural season of existence, it would also turn out to be the General Electrics' only season of existence in that new league, as well as their final season of existence properly, since they would end up being winless with a 0–8 record and decided to go defunct as a franchise for good not long afterward.

By the season's end, the Fort Wayne General Electrics would see Scott Armstrong make it to the All-NBL First Team, while Bart Quinn made it to the All-NBL Second Team.

== Roster ==
Please note that due to the way records for professional basketball leagues like the NBL and the ABL were recorded at the time, some information on both teams and players may be harder to list out than usual here.

1937–38 Fort Wayne General Electrics roster
Players

Pos.	No.	Player	Height	Weight	DOB	From
G/F		Willie Adams	5 ft 11 in (1.80 m)	160 lb (73 kg)	1911–10–02	Emmaus Lutheran HS
F/C		Scott Armstrong	6 ft 4 in (1.93 m)	190 lb (86 kg)	1913–10–12	Butler
G/F		Byron Evard	5 ft 8 in (1.73 m)	155 lb (70 kg)	1908–03–27	St. Viator College
G		Jim Hilgemann	5 ft 11 in (1.80 m)	170 lb (77 kg)	1914–04–11	Toledo
G		Ife Holmes	5 ft 6 in (1.68 m)	150 lb (68 kg)	1905–08–15	DePauw
G		Bud Lindberg	6 ft 0 in (1.83 m)	175 lb (79 kg)	1909–09–13	Illinois
F		Bart Quinn	6 ft 2 in (1.88 m)	200 lb (91 kg)	1917–02–19	Toledo
F/C		Pres Slack	6 ft 2 in (1.88 m)	180 lb (82 kg)	1908–12–28	Central HS (IN)

Coaches
Head coach
- Byron Evard

Legend
- (DP) Unsigned draft pick
- (FA) Free agent
- (S) Suspended
- Injured

Roster

== Regular season ==
=== NBL Season standings ===
Pos	Western Division	Wins	Losses	Win %
1	Oshkosh All-Stars	12	2	.857
2	Whiting Ciesar All-Americans	12	3	.800
3	Fort Wayne General Electrics	13	7	.650
4	Indianapolis Kautskys	4	9	.308
5	Richmond King Clothiers / Cincinnati Comellos^{‡}	3	7	.300
6	Kankakee Gallagher Trojans	3	11	.214
7	Dayton Metropolitans	2	11	.154
^{‡} Richmond relocated to Cincinnati during the season and assumed Richmond's record in the standings. Richmond's record was 1–2 and Cincinnati's record was 2–5.

=== NBL Schedule ===
An official database created by John Grasso detailing every NBL match possible (outside of two matches that the Kankakee Gallagher Trojans won over the Dayton Metropolitans in 1938) would be released in 2026 showcasing every team's official schedules throughout their time spent in the NBL. As such, these are the official results recorded for the Fort Wayne General Electrics works team in their only season in the NBL.

- December 2, 1937 @ Fort Wayne, IN: Richmond King Clothiers 36, Fort Wayne General Electrics 48
- December 5, 1937 @ Fort Wayne, IN: Indianapolis Kautskys 41, Fort Wayne General Electrics 31
- December 8, 1937 @ Kankakee, IL: Fort Wayne General Electrics 38, Kankakee Gallagher Trojans 19
- December 16, 1937 @ Fort Wayne, IN: Whiting Ciesar All-Americans 30, Fort Wayne General Electrics 51
- December 23, 1937 @ Fort Wayne, IN: Akron Goodyear Wingfoots 25, Fort Wayne General Electrics 29
- December 30, 1937 @ Fort Wayne, IN: Dayton Metropolitans 17, Fort Wayne General Electrics 42
- January 6, 1938 @ Fort Wayne, IN: Indianapolis Kautskys 31, Fort Wayne General Electrics 32
- January 8, 1938 @ Warren, PA: Fort Wayne General Electrics 26, Warren Penns 35
- January 9, 1938 @ Akron, OH: Fort Wayne General Electrics 30, Akron Firestone Non-Skids 40
- January 16, 1938 @ Whiting, IN: Fort Wayne General Electrics 37, Whiting Ciesar All-Americans 42
- January 20, 1938 @ Akron, OH: Fort Wayne General Electrics 52, Akron Firestone Non-Skids 41
- January 22, 1938 @ Akron, OH: Fort Wayne General Electrics 22, Akron Goodyear Wingfoots 28
- January 23, 1938 (Officially Planned Game 1 @ Dayton, OH): Fort Wayne General Electrics 32, Dayton Metropolitans 25
- January 23, 1938 (Planned Game 2 @ Columbus, OH): The Fort Wayne General Electrics would win the match they had scheduled that day over the Columbus Athletic Supply team by forfeiture. (As such, 2–0 favoring Fort Wayne would be the official recorded score for this match.)
- January 27, 1938 @ Fort Wayne, IN: Warren Penns 25, Fort Wayne General Electrics 63
- February 3, 1938 @ Columbus, OH: Columbus Athletic Supply 22, Fort Wayne General Electrics 50
- February 10, 1938 @ Fort Wayne, IN: Oshkosh All-Stars 33, Fort Wayne General Electrics 30
- February 13, 1938 @ Cincinnati, OH: The Fort Wayne General Electrics won over the Cincinnati Comellos by forced forfeiture for the rest of Cincinnati's season. (As such, 2–0 favoring Fort Wayne would be the official recorded score for this match.)
- February 16, 1938 @ Fort Wayne, IN: Kankakee Gallagher Trojans 42, Fort Wayne General Electrics 75
- February 19, 1938 @ Oshkosh, WI: Fort Wayne General Electrics 38, Oshkosh All-Stars 54

Interestingly enough, the Fort Wayne General Electrics would end up being the only NBL team this season to play the intended plan of 20 scheduled games for the inaugural NBL season.

=== Awards and honors ===
- First Team All-NBL – Scott Armstrong
- Second Team All-NBL – Bart Quinn
