= List of NBA players (S) =

This is a list of National Basketball Association players whose last names begin with S.

The list also includes players from the American National Basketball League (NBL), the Basketball Association of America (BAA), and the original American Basketball Association (ABA). All of these leagues contributed to the formation of the present-day NBA.

Individuals who played in the NBL prior to its 1949 merger with the BAA are listed in italics, as they are not traditionally listed in the NBA's official player registers.

== S ==
- Frank Sabo
- Arvydas Sabonis
- Domantas Sabonis
- Ed Sachs
- Frank Sachse
- Leo Sack
- Robert Sacre
- Ed Sadowski (b. 1917)
- Eddie Sadowski (b. 1915)
- Junior Saffer
- Ken Sailors
- Tidjane Salaün
- John Salley
- Hunter Sallis
- John Salmons
- Al Salvadori
- Kevin Salvadori
- Soumaila Samake
- Luka Šamanić
- Cheikh Samb
- Brandon Sampson
- JaKarr Sampson
- Jamal Sampson
- Ralph Sampson
- Jermaine Samuels
- Samardo Samuels
- Pepe Sánchez
- Al Sanders
- Frankie Sanders
- Jeff Sanders
- Kobe Sanders
- Larry Sanders
- Melvin Sanders
- Mike Sanders
- Satch Sanders
- Payton Sandfort
- Ron Sanford
- Adama Sanogo
- Daniel Santiago
- Bob Santini
- Gui Santos
- Wayne Sappleton
- Ben Saraf
- Dario Šarić
- Alex Sarr
- Olivier Sarr
- Jason Sasser
- Jeryl Sasser
- Marcus Sasser
- Kenny Satterfield
- Bill Sattler
- Louie Sauer
- Frank Saul
- Woody Sauldsberry
- Glynn Saulters
- Fred Saunders
- Rusty Saunders
- Don Savage
- Predrag Savović
- Alan Sawyer
- Brian Scalabrine
- Alex Scales
- DeWayne Scales
- Ted Scalissi
- Jack Scarry
- Frank Schade
- Ben Schadler
- Herm Schaefer
- Billy Schaeffer
- Bob Schafer
- Jordan Schakel
- Bennie Schall
- Ben Scharnus
- Marv Schatzman
- Fred Schaus
- Danny Schayes
- Dolph Schayes
- Ossie Schectman
- Herb Scheffler
- Steve Scheffler
- Tom Scheffler
- Baylor Scheierman
- Ed Scheiwe
- Dave Schellhase
- Luke Schenscher
- Herb Scherer
- John Schick
- Dwayne Schintzius
- Glenn Schlechty
- Dale Schlueter
- Otto Schnellbacher
- Dick Schnittker
- Russ Schoene
- Admiral Schofield
- Dave Scholz
- Gene Scholz
- Milt Schoon
- Bill Schrader
- Warren Schrage
- Al Schrecker
- Detlef Schrempf
- Bill Schroeder
- Dennis Schröder
- Wilbur Schu
- Herm Schuessler
- Howie Schultz
- Dick Schulz
- Wilbur Schumacher
- Roger Schurig
- Bob Schwartz
- John Schweitz
- Luis Scola
- Fred Scolari
- Alvin Scott
- Brent Scott
- Byron Scott
- Charlie Scott
- Dennis Scott
- James Scott
- Joe Scott
- Mike Scott
- Ray Scott
- Shawnelle Scott
- Trevon Scott
- Willie Scott
- Paul Scranton
- Jay Scrubb
- Carey Scurry
- Dereon Seabron
- Bruce Seals
- Shea Seals
- Malik Sealy
- Tom Sealy
- Ed Searcy
- Ken Sears
- Mark Sears
- Johnny Sebastian
- Wayne See
- Thabo Sefolosha
- Rony Seikaly
- Glen Selbo
- Josh Selby
- Wayne Selden Jr.
- Brad Sellers
- Jaylin Sellers
- Phil Sellers
- Rollie Seltz
- Les Selvage
- Frank Selvy
- Jim Seminoff
- Mouhamed Sene
- George Senesky
- Alperen Şengün
- Brice Sensabaugh
- Kevin Séraphin
- Ansu Sesay
- Ramon Sessions
- Tom Sewell
- Collin Sexton
- Paul Seymour
- Nick Shaback
- Lynn Shackelford
- Charles Shackleford
- Bob Shaddock
- Carl Shaeffer
- Jack Shaffer
- Lee Shaffer
- Mustafa Shakur
- Frank Shamel
- Landry Shamet
- God Shammgod
- Chuck Shanklin
- Earl Shannon
- Frank Shannon
- Howie Shannon
- Terrence Shannon Jr.
- Chuck Share
- Steve Sharkey
- Bill Sharman
- Emanuel Sharp
- Day'Ron Sharpe
- Shaedon Sharpe
- Walter Sharpe
- John Shasky
- Ronnie Shavlik
- Bob Shaw
- Brian Shaw
- Casey Shaw
- Marial Shayok
- Bob Shea
- Jamal Shead
- Fred Sheffield
- Craig Shelton
- Lonnie Shelton
- Tornike Shengelia
- Billy Shepherd
- Ben Sheppard
- Jeff Sheppard
- Reed Sheppard
- Steve Sheppard
- Ed Sherod
- Charley Shipp
- Paul Shirley
- Ollie Shoaff
- Gene Short
- Purvis Short
- Slim Shoun
- Dexter Shouse
- Dick Shrider
- Gene Shue
- Max Shulga
- John Shumate
- Iman Shumpert
- Alexey Shved
- Pascal Siakam
- Jordan Sibert
- Sam Sibert
- Mark Sibley
- Jerry Sichting
- Don Sidle
- Vic Siegel
- Larry Siegfried
- Ralph Siewert
- Jack Sikma
- James Silas
- Paul Silas
- Xavier Silas
- Garret Siler
- Mike Silliman
- Chris Silva
- Wayne Simien
- Ben Simmons
- Bobby Simmons
- Cedric Simmons
- Connie Simmons
- Grant Simmons
- John Simmons
- Jonathon Simmons
- Kobi Simmons
- Lionel Simmons
- Miles Simon
- Walt Simon
- Marko Simonović
- Anfernee Simons
- Dickey Simpkins
- KJ Simpson
- Ralph Simpson
- Zavier Simpson
- Alvin Sims
- Bob Sims (b. 1915)
- Bob Sims (b. 1938)
- Courtney Sims
- Doug Sims
- Henry Sims
- Jaylen Sims
- Jericho Sims
- Scott Sims
- John Sines
- Kyle Singler
- Sean Singletary
- Chris Singleton
- James Singleton
- McKinley Singleton
- Zeke Sinicola
- Deividas Sirvydis
- Steve Sitko
- Charlie Sitton
- Peyton Siva
- Dmytro Skapintsev
- Bob Skarda
- Scott Skiles
- Al Skinner
- Brian Skinner
- Talvin Skinner
- Myer Skoog
- Pres Slack
- Jeff Slade
- Reggie Slater
- Jim Slaughter
- Jose Slaughter
- Jalen Slawson
- Tamar Slay
- Donald Sloan
- Jerry Sloan
- Uroš Slokar
- Tom Sluby
- Alen Smailagić
- Javon Small
- Javonte Smart
- Keith Smart
- Marcus Smart
- Belus Smawley
- Danny Smick
- Jack Smiley
- Adrian Smith
- Al Smith
- Bill Smith
- Bingo Smith
- Bobby Smith
- Braden Smith
- Charles Smith (b. 1965)
- Charles Smith (b. 1967)
- Charles Smith (b. 1975)
- Chris Smith (b. 1970)
- Chris Smith (b. 1987)
- Clinton Smith
- Craig Smith
- Deb Smith
- Dennis Smith Jr.
- Derek Smith
- Don Smith (b. 1910)
- Don Smith (b. 1920)
- Don Smith (b. 1951)
- Donta Smith
- Doug Smith
- Dru Smith
- Ed Smith
- Elmore Smith
- Garfield Smith
- Greg Smith (b. 1947)
- Greg Smith (b. 1991)
- Ish Smith
- J. R. Smith
- Jabari Smith
- Jabari Smith Jr.
- Jalen Smith
- Jason Smith
- Jerry Smith
- Jim Smith
- Joe Smith
- John Smith
- Josh Smith
- Keith Smith
- Ken Smith
- Kenny Smith
- LaBradford Smith
- Larry Smith
- Leon Smith
- Malachi Smith
- Michael Smith (b. 1965)
- Michael Smith (b. 1972)
- Mike Smith
- Nick Smith Jr.
- Nolan Smith
- Otis Smith
- Pete Smith
- Phil Smith
- Randy Smith
- Reggie Smith
- Robert Smith
- Russ Smith
- Sam Smith (b. 1943)
- Sam Smith (b. 1955)
- Steve Smith
- Steven Smith
- Stevin Smith
- Terquavion Smith
- Theron Smith
- Tolu Smith
- Tony Smith
- Tyler Smith
- Wee Willie Smith
- William Smith
- Willie Smith
- Zhaire Smith
- Rik Smits
- Mike Smrek
- Joe Smyth
- Xavier Sneed
- Tony Snell
- Eric Snow
- Bello Snyder
- Dick Snyder
- Kirk Snyder
- Chips Sobek
- Ricky Sobers
- Ron Sobieszczyk
- Jeremy Sochan
- Mike Sojourner
- Willie Sojourner
- Paul Sokody
- Will Solomon
- Willie Somerset
- Darius Songaila
- Harry Sorenson
- Dave Sorenson
- Joe Sotak
- James Southerland
- Gino Sovran
- Pape Sow
- Ken Spain
- Ray Spalding
- Jim Spanarkel
- Vassilis Spanoulis
- Dan Sparks
- Guy Sparrow
- Rory Sparrow
- Odie Spears
- Art Spector
- Marreese Speights
- Omari Spellman
- Andre Spencer
- Cam Spencer
- Elmore Spencer
- Felton Spencer
- Jack Spencer
- Pat Spencer
- Lou Spicer
- Craig Spitzer
- Tiago Splitter
- Art Spoelstra
- Edward Spotovich
- Bruce Spraggins
- Latrell Sprewell
- Larry Spriggs
- Jaden Springer
- Jim Springer
- Jim Spruill
- Joe Spudic
- Joe Stack
- Ryan Stack
- Jerry Stackhouse
- Kevin Stacom
- Erv Staggs
- Bud Stallworth
- Dave Stallworth
- Howard Stammler
- Joseph Stampf
- Ed Stanczak
- Walt Stanky
- Cassius Stanley
- Terence Stansbury
- Jack Stanton
- Clovis Stark
- John Starks
- Keith Starr
- Dick Starzyk
- Nik Stauskas
- Larry Staverman
- Larry Steele
- Ed Stege
- Matt Steigenga
- Hannes Steinbach
- Jerry Steiner
- Vladimir Stepania
- John Stephans
- Ben Stephens
- D. J. Stephens
- Everette Stephens
- Jack Stephens
- Joe Stephens
- Lance Stephenson
- Alex Stepheson
- Brook Steppe
- Barry Stevens
- Isaiah Stevens
- Lamar Stevens
- Wayne Stevens
- DeShawn Stevenson
- Dennis Stewart
- Isaiah Stewart
- Kebu Stewart
- Larry Stewart
- Michael Stewart
- Norm Stewart
- Greg Stiemsma
- Steve Stipanovich
- Jack Stirling
- Bennett Stirtz
- Bryant Stith
- Sam Stith
- Tom Stith
- Alex Stivrins
- David Stockton
- John Stockton
- Art Stoefen
- Peja Stojaković
- Ed Stokes
- Greg Stokes
- Jarnell Stokes
- Maurice Stokes
- Art Stolkey
- Randy Stoll
- Diamond Stone
- George Stone
- Julyan Stone
- Awvee Storey
- Damon Stoudamire
- Salim Stoudamire
- Amar'e Stoudemire
- Marvin Stout
- Paul Stovall
- Dave Strack
- Ted Strain
- Reno Strand
- D. J. Strawberry
- Joe Strawder
- Julian Strawther
- Bill Stricker
- Erick Strickland
- Mark Strickland
- Rod Strickland
- Roger Strickland
- John Stroeder
- Derek Strong
- Ted Strong
- Lamont Strothers
- John Stroud
- Red Stroud
- Chet Strumillo
- Max Strus
- Rodney Stuckey
- Gene Stump
- Stanley Stutz
- John Styler
- Sally Suddith
- Ken Suesens
- Jalen Suggs
- Gary Suiter
- Jared Sullinger
- Bob Sullivan
- Bill Sumerix
- DaJuan Summers
- Edmond Sumner
- Barry Sumpter
- Sun Yue
- Don Sunderlage
- Bruno Šundov
- Jon Sundvold
- Bob Sura
- Dick Surhoff
- George Sutor
- Dane Suttle
- Greg Sutton
- George Svendsen
- Keith Swagerty
- Bennie Swain
- Dailyn Swain
- Caleb Swanigan
- Everett Swank
- Duane Swanson
- Hale Swanson
- Norm Swanson
- Dan Swartz
- Michael Sweetney
- Cole Swider
- Robert Swift
- Skeeter Swift
- Stromile Swift
- Willard Swihart
- Aaron Swinson
- Craig Sword
- Pape Sy
- Buck Sydnor
- Keifer Sykes
- Larry Sykes
- Bob Synnott
- Brett Szabo
- Walt Szczerbiak
- Wally Szczerbiak
- Stan Szukala
