= 1936–37 Columbus Athletic Supply season =

MBC professional basketball team season

- League: Midwest Basketball Conference
- Head coach: Fred Wile
- Owner(s): Columbus Athletic Supplies
- Arena: Ohio State Fairgrounds Arena (Taft Coliseum?)

Results
- Record: 6–5 (.545)
- Place: Division: 4th (Eastern)
- Playoff finish: Did not qualify

The 1936–37 Columbus Athletic Supply season was the first and only professional season for the Columbus Athletic Supply team (who were owned and operated by the business of the same name) in Columbus, Ohio under the Midwest Basketball Conference (MBC), which was also the second and final year that league existed before it technically folded operations due to the MBC rebranding itself into the United States' National Basketball League (NBL) for its following season of play. This was also the Columbus Athletic Supply franchise's inaugural season of play (most likely speaking) as well. The Columbus Athletic Supply team would enter this season as one of five new teams to officially enter the MBC this season when the Columbus Athletic Supplies business wanted to have their own team compete against the rest of the competition in the MBC this season. Because of that fact, twelve teams competed in the MBC this time around, six teams in each of the Eastern Division (Columbus' division) and the Western Division (including the inaugural, defending champion Chicago Duffy Florals).

Had this team been competing in the Western Division instead of the Eastern Division this season, the Columbus Athletic Supply team would have ended up qualifying as a playoff team this season since they ended their season with a winning record. However, because Columbus ended up competing in the Eastern Division this season due to their placement within the state of Ohio (as Akron and Columbus were both in the Eastern region of that state, while Dayton was in the Western region of Ohio), the Columbus Athletic Supply's above-average 6–5 record would only be good enough for a fourth-place finish within the Eastern Division, which would still be behind the Warren Hyvis Oils (or Warren HyVis Oilers), the Akron Firestone Non-Skids works team, and the eventual champion Akron Goodyear Wingfoots works team. That placement in their division meant they would fail to qualify for the MBC playoffs this season. Following the season's conclusion, the Midwest Basketball Conference would revamp itself into the National Basketball League, which eventually became a league that would merge with the future rivaling Basketball Association of America to become the National Basketball Association for the present-day era.

== Roster ==
Due to information on Midwest Basketball Conference players being generally hard to find, there are bound to be more gaps and/or inaccuracies found in certain areas on the team's roster spots than usual.

Player	Position
Dan Davies	G
Prexy Ervin	G
Bill Hosket Sr.	C
Herbie Hutchisson	G
Bud Moodler	G-F
Curley Owen	F
Max Padlow	G-F
Woody Pitzer	G-F
Mel Shaw	G-F
Howard Stammler	G
Clovis Stark	G-F
Jack Stewart	G-F
Ernie Talos	G
George Van Heyde	C
Warren Whitlinger	G

There would also be a guard with the last name of Grove playing for the team for a game as well.

== MBC Standings ==
=== MBC Eastern Division ===
Pos.	Eastern Division	Wins	Losses	Win %
1	Akron Goodyear Wingfoots	16	2	.889
2	Akron Firestone Non-Skids	13	5	.722
3	Warren HyVis Oils	8	6	.571
4	Columbus Athletic Supply	6	5	.545
5	Detroit Altes Lagers	2	8	.200
6	Pittsburgh Y.M.H.A.	2	9	.182

=== MBC Western Division ===
Pos.	Western Division	Wins	Losses	Win %
1	Dayton London Bobbys	8	6	.571
2	Fort Wayne General Electrics	6	6	.500
3	Whiting Ciesar All-Americans	3	5	.375
4	Chicago Duffy Florals	4	7	.364
5	Indianapolis Kautskys	2	5	.286
6	Indianapolis U.S. Tires	3	9	.250
