= 1937–38 Akron Firestone Non-Skids season =

NBL professional basketball team season

- Division champions
- Head coach: Paul Sheeks
- Owner: Firestone
- Arena: Firestone Clubhouse

Results
- Record: 14–4 (.778)
- Place: Division: 1st (Eastern)
- Playoff finish: Lost Eastern Division Playoff to Akron Goodyear Wingfoots, 2–0

The 1937–38 Akron Firestone Non-Skids season was the Firestone Non-Skids' first professional year in the United States' National Basketball League (NBL), which was also the first year the league existed. However, if one were to include their previous seasons of play in both precursors of sorts to the NBL in the National Professional Basketball League and the Midwest Basketball Conference alongside the couple of independent seasons of play they had before officially entering the NBL, this would officially be (at least) their sixth season of play instead. Thirteen teams competed in the NBL, comprising six teams in the Eastern Division (including the Akron Firestone Non-Skids) and seven teams in the Western Division. The Non-Skids were one of two works teams from Akron, Ohio competing in the newly created/rebranded league, with the other being the Akron Goodyear Wingfoots.

The Non-Skids played their home games at the Firestone Clubhouse. Due to their status as one of the founding teams of this league, the Firestone Non-Skids would host the inaugural NBL season on November 27, 1937, with a blowout 53–20 victory over the Indianapolis Kautskys, who were the other team who had ownership help create the NBL throughout its existence. They later finished this season with a division-leading 14–4 record (including a forfeited win over the Columbus Athletic Supply team), with their record being one game better than the inner city rivaling Akron Goodyear Wingfoots to ultimately be named the inaugural Eastern Division champions for the regular season. However, they would end up being upset against the inner city rivaling Akron Goodyear Wingfoots in the Eastern Division Playoff two games to none, with the Goodyear squad then going on to win the league's championship series match-up against the Western Division's Oshkosh All-Stars two games to one in a best-of-three series.

This season would see both Soup Cable and Jack Ozburn earn the inaugural NBL season's All-NBL Second Team honors for this team.

== Roster ==
1937–38 Akron Firestone Non-Skids roster
Players

Pos.	No.	Player	Height	Weight	DOB	From
G/F		Al Bonniwell	6 ft 1 in (1.85 m)	175 lb (79 kg)	1911–10-06	Dartmouth
G		Soup Cable	6 ft 3 in (1.91 m)	200 lb (91 kg)	1913–04–04	West HS (OH)
F/C		Duck Dowell	6 ft 3 in (1.91 m)	200 lb (91 kg)	1912–08–14	Northwest Missouri State
G/F		Mally Johnson	5 ft 10 in (1.78 m)	165 lb (75 kg)	1908–02–04	NC State
G		Sew Leeka	6 ft 1 in (1.85 m)	185 lb (84 kg)	1907–09–15	Iowa
G/F		Jack Ozburn	6 ft 1 in (1.85 m)	175 lb (79 kg)	1913–01–04	Monmouth (IL)
G		Bill Reeves	5 ft 10 in (1.78 m)	165 lb (75 kg)	1904–12–05	Central (IN)
F/C		Jack Shaffer	6 ft 3 in (1.91 m)	190 lb (86 kg)	1909–08–13	DePaul
C		Slim Shoun	6 ft 11 in (2.11 m)	210 lb (95 kg)	1904–10–04	Carson–Newman
G		Paul Tobin	5 ft 9 in (1.75 m)	170 lb (77 kg)	1909–11–23	West HS (OH)
G/F		Warren Whitlinger	5 ft 9 in (1.75 m)	170 lb (77 kg)	1914–04–04	Ohio State

Coaches
Head coach
- Paul Sheeks

Legend
- (DP) Unsigned draft pick
- (FA) Free agent
- (S) Suspended
- Injured

Roster

Note: Bill Reeves and Jack Shaffer were not on the playoff roster.

== Regular season ==
=== Season standings ===
Pos.	Eastern Division	Wins	Losses	Win %
1	Akron Firestone Non-Skids	14	4	.778
2	Akron Goodyear Wingfoots	13	5	.722
3	Pittsburgh Pirates	8	5	.615
4	Buffalo Bisons	3	6	.333
5	Warren Penns	3	9	.250
6	Columbus Athletic Supply	1	12	.091

=== NBL Schedule ===
- November 27, 1937 @ Akron, OH: Indianapolis Kautskys 20, Akron Firestone Non-Skids 53 (Inaugural game played to start out the existence of the NBL.)
- November 28, 1937 @ Buffalo, NY: Akron Firestone Non-Skids 21, Buffalo Bisons 19 (Experimented with using 3 periods that were 15 minutes of length similar to the rivaling American Basketball League as opposed to the more typical 4 quarters that would be 10 minutes long on the NBL's end for their games.)
- December 5, 1937 @ Akron, OH: Whiting Ciesar All-Americans 40, Akron Firestone Non-Skids 34
- December 14, 1937 @ Warren, PA: Akron Firestone Non-Skids 43, Warren Penns 21
- December 19, 1937 @ Akron, OH: Indianapolis Kautskys 33, Akron Firestone Non-Skids 46
- December 22, 1937 @ Pittsburgh, PA: Akron Firestone Non-Skids 33, Pittsburgh Pirates 43
- December 29, 1937 @ Akron, OH: Columbus Athletic Supply 33, Akron Firestone Non-Skids 52
- January 5, 1938 @ Akron, OH: Buffalo Bisons 37, Akron Firestone Non-Skids 38
- January 9, 1938 @ Akron, OH: Fort Wayne General Electrics 30, Akron Firestone Non-Skids 40
- January 15, 1938 @ Akron, OH: Akron Goodyear Wingfoots 30, Akron Firestone Non-Skids 35
- January 19, 1938 @ Akron, OH: Dayton Metropolitans 28, Akron Firestone Non-Skids 41
- January 20, 1938 @ Akron, OH: Fort Wayne General Electrics 52, Akron Firestone Non-Skids 41
- January 23, 1938 @ Whiting, IN: Akron Firestone Non-Skids 40, Whiting Ciesar All-Americans 47
- January 31, 1938 @ Akron, OH: Akron Firestone Non-Skids 43, Akron Goodyear Wingfoots 42
- February 8, 1938 @ Warren, PA: Akron Firestone Non-Skids 42, Warren Penns 32
- February 13, 1938 @ Akron, OH: Pittsburgh Pirates 41, Akron Firestone Non-Skids 43
- February 20, 1938 (Planned Game 1 @ Columbus or Akron, OH): The Akron Firestone Non-Skids win over the Columbus Athletic Supply team by forfeiture. (As such, 2–0 favoring the Akron Firestone Non-Skids would be the official recorded score for this match.)
- February 20, 1938 ([Planned Game 2 that officially became their only (Game 1) game played for the day] @ Dayton, OH): Akron Firestone Non-Skids 36, Dayton Metropolitans 30

== NBL Playoffs ==
=== NBL Eastern Division Playoff ===
(E1) Akron Firestone Non-Skids vs. (E2) Akron Goodyear Wingfoots: Goodyear Wingfoots win series 2–0

- Game 1: February 24, 1938 @ Goodyear Wingfoots: Goodyear Wingfoots 26, Firestone Non-Skids 21
- Game 2: February 25, 1938 @ Firestone Non-Skids: Goodyear Wingfoots 37, Firestone Non-Skids 31

== Awards and honors ==
- All-NBL Second Team – Soup Cable and Jack Ozburn
