= 1936–37 Fort Wayne General Electrics season =

MBC professional basketball team season

- League: Midwest Basketball Conference
- Head coach: Ray Lindemuth
- Owner(s): General Electric
- Arena: Fort Wayne General Electric Gymnasium; North Side High School Gymnasium

Results
- Record: 6–6 (.500)
- Place: Division: 2nd (Western)
- Playoff finish: Lost MBC Championship series to Akron Goodyear Wingfoots, 0–2

The 1936–37 Fort Wayne General Electrics season was the first (and technically only) professional basketball season of play for the Fort Wayne General Electrics in the city of Fort Wayne, Indiana under the Midwest Basketball Conference (MBC), which was also the second and final year that league existed before it technically folded operations due to the MBC rebranding itself into the United States' National Basketball League (NBL) for its following season of play. However, if you include the independent seasons of play before this season where they joined the Midwest Basketball Conference in its second and final season of existence, this would officially be considered at least their tenth overall season of existence as a team instead, with their team being slated to have lasted for as long as 1926 in order to have them play for at least ten seasons by this point in time instead of just one season here. The General Electrics would enter this season as one of five new teams to officially enter the MBC this season when General Electric's local branch that they had in Fort Wayne, Indiana at the time would look to join the Firestone Tire & Rubber Company's Akron Firestone Non-Skids (and later, the Goodyear Tire & Rubber Company's Akron Goodyear Wingfoots) out in Akron, Ohio as successful works teams operating within the new league while helping boost employee morale within the Fort Wayne branch at General Electric during this season. As a result of that, twelve teams competed in the MBC this time around, six teams in each of the Eastern Division (though it originally started out as five teams in that division at first) and the Western Division (including Fort Wayne and the inaugural, defending champion Chicago Duffy Florals).

Throughout this entire season, the Western Division of the MBC would not be as strong as the best teams of the Eastern Division this season (which were the two works teams based in nearby Akron, Ohio). However, the Fort Wayne General Electrics would end up being the second-best team out of every other team in the Western Division outside of the Dayton London Bobbys for this season due to the fact that Fort Wayne's squad was the only other team in their division this season to finish the season with even an average record due to their 6–6 finish. Because of that fact, the average General Electrics squad would end up qualifying for the reformatted MBC Playoffs with a second-place finish, as Fort Wayne went up against the recently rebranded Dayton London Bobbys (who finished their season in the Western Division with an above-average 8–6 record for first place in their division, while every other team in that same division, including the inaugural (controversial) champion Chicago Duffy Florals, finished their season with a losing season by comparison) for a shot at winning the second MBC championship ever held over one of the two Akron squads in the Eastern Division. In the newly created Western Division Playoffs for the MBC Playoffs, both Fort Wayne and Dayton would split the first two games played in that series before Dayton surprised Fort Wayne close to a half-hour before playing the deciding third and final game of the playoff series by having Dayton's head coach, Bob McConachie, calling Fort Wayne coach Ray Lindemuth to let him know that the Dayton London Bobbys were going to forfeit Game 3 of the series (and by extension, the entire playoff series) to the General Electrics team for a reason that was ultimately unknown due to McConachie hanging up on Lindemuth before answering why the forfeit was considered necessary; outroars on having the team be expelled from the newly created league and forfeit their $500 entry fee into the MBC were also brought up afterward, though nothing would come out of this scenario during this season. To this day, in modern-day basketball's history when connecting the MBC's history to the NBA, Dayton's Game 3 forfeit to Fort Wayne was the only true playoff game to ever be forfeited in the sport of basketball (though there would be equivalents in the revived American Basketball League when the original Baltimore Bullets forfeited the championship series to the Trenton Tigers without playing a game there due to scheduling conflicts and in the American Basketball Association's inaugural season when the fourth place tiebreaker match between the Kentucky Colonels and the New Jersey Americans would be forfeited in favor of Kentucky due to awful playing conditions for the court on that tiebreaker match's game night, as well as one close call during the 2020 NBA Bubble period).

Following the season's conclusion, the Midwest Basketball Conference would revamp itself into the National Basketball League, which eventually became a league that would merge with the future rivaling Basketball Association of America to become the National Basketball Association for the present-day era, with the London Bobbys renaming themselves back into the Dayton Metropolitans once again by that point in time after the Miami Valley Brewing Company sold off their original shares and gave them back to the Dayton Metropolitan Clothing Store. In any case, the General Electrics would later see themselves go up against the best team of the entire league this season in the Akron Goodyear Wingfoots (a team who had an 18–2 record) for a shot at the championship, though the General Electrics would end up being swept 2–0 by the Goodyear Wingfoots in the second and final championship series ever held by the MBC. Following the season's conclusion, the Midwest Basketball Conference would revamp itself into the National Basketball League, which eventually became a league that would merge with the future rivaling Basketball Association of America to become the National Basketball Association for the present-day era, though Fort Wayne's squad would often be misconstrued as a co-creator of the NBL alongside the two Akron works teams when it was actually the creation of the Akron Firestone Non-Skids' Paul Sheeks and the Indianapolis Kautskys' Frank Kautsky together, technically speaking.

== Roster ==
Due to information on Midwest Basketball Conference players being generally hard to find, there are bound to be more gaps and/or inaccuracies found in certain areas on the team's roster spots than usual.

1936–37 Fort Wayne General Electrics roster
Players

Pos.	No.	Player	Height	Weight	DOB	From
G/F		Willie Adams	5 ft 11 in (1.80 m)	160 lb (73 kg)	1911–10–02	Emmaus Lutheran HS
F/C		Scott Armstrong	6 ft 4 in (1.93 m)	190 lb (86 kg)	1913–10–12	Butler
G/F		Byron Evard	5 ft 8 in (1.73 m)	155 lb (70 kg)	1908–03–27	St. Viator College
G		Ife Holmes	5 ft 6 in (1.68 m)	150 lb (68 kg)	1905–08–15	DePauw
G		Bud Lindberg	6 ft 0 in (1.83 m)	175 lb (79 kg)	1909–09–13	Illinois
G		Elmer Paul	6 ft 0 in (1.83 m)	190 lb (86 kg)	1905–09–08	Butler
F		Bart Quinn	6 ft 2 in (1.88 m)	200 lb (91 kg)	1917–02–19	Toledo
F/C		Pres Slack	6 ft 2 in (1.88 m)	180 lb (82 kg)	1908–12–28	Central HS (IN)

Coaches
Head coach
- Byron Evard

Legend
- (DP) Unsigned draft pick
- (FA) Free agent
- (S) Suspended
- Injured

Note: Elmer Paul would not participate in the MBC Playoffs this season for one reason or another.

== MBC Standings ==
=== MBC Eastern Division ===
Pos.	Eastern Division	Wins	Losses	Win %
1	Akron Goodyear Wingfoots	16	2	.889
2	Akron Firestone Non-Skids	13	5	.722
3	Warren HyVis Oils	8	6	.571
4	Columbus Athletic Supply	6	5	.545
5	Detroit Altes Lagers	2	8	.200
6	Pittsburgh Y.M.H.A.	2	9	.182

=== MBC Western Division ===
Pos.	Western Division	Wins	Losses	Win %
1	Dayton London Bobbys	8	6	.571
2	Fort Wayne General Electrics	6	6	.500
3	Whiting Ciesar All-Americans	3	5	.375
4	Chicago Duffy Florals	4	7	.364
5	Indianapolis Kautskys	2	5	.286
6	Indianapolis U.S. Tires	3	9	.250

== MBC Playoffs ==
=== MBC Western Division Playoff ===
(W2) Fort Wayne General Electrics vs. (W1) Dayton London Bobbys: Fort Wayne win series 2–1

- Game 1 @ Dayton: Dayton 36, Fort Wayne 25
- Game 2 @ Fort Wayne: Fort Wayne 31, Dayton 28
- Game 3 @ Fort Wayne: Dayton forfeits both the game and the series to Fort Wayne for some unknown reason. As such, the final score for this game is officially labeled as 2–0 favoring Fort Wayne.

This marked the only time in the MBC/NBL's history where a team would forfeit a playoff game/series, albeit for unknown reasons.

=== MBC Championship ===
(W2) Fort Wayne General Electrics vs. (E1) Akron Goodyear Wingfoots: Akron win series 2–0

- Game 1 @ Akron: Akron 28, Fort Wayne 22
- Game 2 @ Fort Wayne: Akron 27, Fort Wayne 24
