= 1936–37 Midwest Basketball Conference season =

1936–37 MBC season
- League: Midwest Basketball Conference
- Sport: Basketball
- Duration: November 1937 – February 16, 1938; February–March 2, 1938 (Playoffs/Finals); February 28(?)–March 2, 1938 (Finals)
- Games: 7-18
- Teams: 11 (later 12^{note})

Regular season
- Season champions: Akron Goodyear Wingfoots
- Top seed: Akron Goodyear Wingfoots
- Top scorer: Jack Shaffer (Akron Firestone Non-Skids)

Playoffs
- Eastern champions: Akron Goodyear Wingfoots
- Eastern runners-up: Akron Firestone Non-Skids
- Western champions: Fort Wayne General Electrics
- Western runners-up: Dayton London Bobbys

Finals
- Venue: Goodyear Hall, Akron, Ohio; Fort Wayne General Electric Gymnasium, Fort Wayne, Indiana
- Champions: Akron Goodyear Wingfoots
- Runners-up: Fort Wayne General Electrics

MBC/NBL seasons
- ← 1935–36 (MBC) 1937–38 (NBL) →

The 1936–37 Midwest Basketball Conference (MBC) season was the league's second and final season under that name. The season introduced changes to league structure and competition, concluded with the Akron Goodyear Wingfoots winning the championship, and directly led to the league's reorganization and rebranding as the National Basketball League (NBL). It is retrospectively regarded as the second season in the NBL's history and represents an early stage in the institutional development that eventually contributed to the formation of the National Basketball Association (NBA).

== League structure and competition ==
Entering its second season, the MBC implemented several reforms aimed at improving competitive balance and financial viability. The minimum number of required league games was reduced from twelve to eight, reflecting concerns about the sustainability of a schedule composed exclusively of games between league members. League membership expanded from eight or nine teams in the inaugural season to twelve teams for most of the 1936–37 campaign.

The league also revised its postseason format, replacing the previous season's one-day round-robin tournament with a more conventional playoff system. The Akron Goodyear Wingfoots won the second and final Midwest Basketball Conference championship.

== Rebranding and historical significance ==
Despite these changes, league performance and organizational stability remained uneven. Following the conclusion of the season, the Midwest Basketball Conference officially changed its name to the National Basketball League and transitioned from a semi-professional structure to a fully professional league. Under the NBL name, the league continued for twelve additional seasons, from 1937–38 through 1948–49, before merging with the Basketball Association of America (BAA) in 1949 to form the National Basketball Association.

The early history of the MBC and its transformation into the NBL has been examined by historian Murry R. Nelson. In his 2009 book, The National Basketball League: A History, 1935–1949, Nelson devotes a chapter to the two MBC seasons, analyzing the league's origins, rule changes, community-focused approach, and its influence on the development of professional basketball.

Despite the NBL's role as a direct institutional predecessor to the NBA, the NBA does not officially recognize the twelve NBL seasons, the two MBC seasons, or the earlier National Professional Basketball League season as part of its formal historical record, except in limited circumstances. Instead, the NBA recognizes the 1946–47 BAA season as its first official season.

Of the teams that participated in the 1936–37 MBC season, only the Indianapolis Kautskys later appeared in what can be considered the NBA lineage. The franchise joined the BAA as the Indianapolis Jets for the 1948–49 season but folded after one year, prior to the formal BAA–NBL merger on August 3, 1949. None of the other franchises from the final MBC season ultimately competed in the modern NBA.

== Team changes and league composition ==
Before the start of the Midwest Basketball Conference's second season, the league underwent significant changes in membership. The original Buffalo Bisons withdrew from the league, a move later characterized by the franchise as temporary, while the Windsor Cooper Buses, the league's sole Canadian-based team, also departed; Windsor's withdrawal ultimately proved permanent for both the MBC and its successor, the National Basketball League.

To offset these losses, several new teams were admitted. These included the Columbus Athletic Supply team, the Fort Wayne General Electrics, a works team operated by the General Electric Company's Fort Wayne division, the Warren HyVis Oils (also known as the Warren HyVis Oilers), and the Whiting Ciesar All-Americans, owned by local automobile dealer Eddie Ciesar. Existing franchises also underwent name changes, with the Dayton Metropolitans becoming the Dayton London Bobbys and the Detroit Hed-Aids rebranding as the Detroit Altes Lagers. Together, these changes brought league membership to twelve teams to begin the 1936–37 season.

Later in the season, the Akron Goodyear Wingfoots joined the league in early December 1936, either on December 3 or December 11, following two exhibition games against the University of Pittsburgh. The Wingfoots, a works team associated with the Goodyear Tire & Rubber Company, were regarded as natural rivals to the Akron Firestone Non-Skids and helped stabilize league membership at twelve teams for the remainder of the season.

=== Coaching changes and early-season performance ===
The 1936–37 season marked the first time in league history that multiple teams changed head coaches prior to the start of a season, a precedent that would continue into the NBL era. The Pittsburgh Y.M.H.A., the Dayton Metropolitans (later the Dayton London Bobbys), and the defending champions, the Chicago Duffy Florals, all appointed new head coaches before league play began.

On the court, Akron's works teams set the early competitive standard. The Akron Goodyear Wingfoots opened their season with an 8–0 record, while their intra-city rivals, the Akron Firestone Non-Skids, began with a 6–0 start. These records represented the strongest openings in the brief history of the Midwest Basketball Conference.

A notable matchup between the two Akron teams took place on January 19, 1937, at the Firestone Clubhouse. Prior to the game, fans attending early were offered table tennis and badminton exhibitions. During the event, it was announced that the Goodyear team had added a previously unknown 6 ft 4 in player from Salt Lake City, Utah, who had spent the previous three years with basketball operations there and was eligible to play that night. The player was later identified as Ralph Crowton, who appeared in the game but did not score. Goodyear defeated Firestone 31–27.

=== Scheduling issues and playoff format ===
The Indianapolis Kautskys became the only MBC team to fail to meet the league's minimum requirement of eight scheduled games. Despite a promising start to the season, the team encountered logistical difficulties related to players’ primary employment outside of basketball. These issues limited player availability to weekend games, and the absence of strong team sponsorship made scheduling accommodations difficult. As a result, owner and head coach Frank Kautsky was unable to arrange a sufficient number of league games.

Unlike the previous season, no playoff qualification controversies arose from this situation. The Kautskys finished ahead of their intra-city rivals, the Indianapolis U.S. Tires, within their division and also held better overall records than several Eastern Division teams, including the Detroit Altes Lagers and the Pittsburgh Y.M.H.A.

Following mixed reactions to the inaugural MBC playoffs, which consisted of a single-day round-robin tournament, the league adopted a new postseason format announced on February 8, 1937. Under the revised system, the top two teams from both the Eastern and Western divisions competed in best-of-three series, with the winners advancing to a final best-of-three championship series.

=== Playoff forfeit ===
An unusual incident occurred during the Western Division playoffs. Prior to Game 3 of the deciding series between the Dayton London Bobbys and the Fort Wayne General Electrics, Dayton player and general manager Bill Hosket Sr. telephoned Fort Wayne general manager and head coach Ray Lindemuth to inform him that Dayton would forfeit the decisive game. When Lindemuth inquired about the reason for the decision, Hosket ended the call without explanation.

This event marked the first and only time in the history of the Midwest Basketball Conference or the National Basketball League that a playoff game was officially forfeited. Likewise, the official successor to both the MBC and NBL, the National Basketball Association, has yet to issue any forfeited games throughout its playoff history as well, though it has come dangerously close to doing so beforehand back in the 2020 NBA Playoffs following the shooting of Jacob Blake.

Eastern Division	Akron Firestone Non-Skids Akron, Ohio	Akron Goodyear Wingfoots Akron, Ohio	Columbus Athletic Supply Columbus, Ohio
Eastern Division	Detroit Altes Lagers Detroit, Michigan	Pittsburgh Y.M.H.A. Pittsburgh, Pennsylvania	Warren HyVis Oilers Warren, Pennsylvania
Western Division	Chicago Duffy Florals Chicago, Illinois	Dayton London Bobbys Dayton, Ohio	Fort Wayne General Electrics Fort Wayne, Indiana
Western Division	Indianapolis Kautskys Indianapolis, Indiana	Indianapolis U.S. Tires Indianapolis, Indiana	Whiting Ciesar All-Americans Whiting, Indiana

Coaching changes
Offseason
Team	1935–36 coach	1936–37 coach
Chicago Duffy Florals	Tom Brice	Johnny Ivers
Dayton Metropolitans / Dayton London Bobbys	Bill Hosket Sr. (player-coach)	Bob McConachie
Pittsburgh Y.M.H.A.	Buck Gefsky	Harry Menzel

== Final standings ==
Pos.	Eastern Division	Wins	Losses	Win %
1	Akron Goodyear Wingfoots	16	2	.889
2	Akron Firestone Non-Skids	13	5	.722
3	Warren HyVis Oils	8	6	.571
4	Columbus Athletic Supply	6	5	.545
5	Detroit Altes Lagers	2	8	.200
6	Pittsburgh Y.M.H.A.	2	9	.182

Pos.	Western Division	Wins	Losses	Win %
1	Dayton London Bobbys	8	6	.571
2	Fort Wayne General Electrics	6	6	.500
3	Whiting Ciesar All-Americans	3	5	.375
4	Chicago Duffy Florals	4	7	.364
5	Indianapolis Kautskys	2	5	.286
6	Indianapolis U.S. Tires	3	9	.250

== Playoffs ==
After dealing with a mixed bag of results for the original round robin tournament formatting held in the inaugural MBC's season for its first ever playoff formatting, the second and final MBC season's playoffs would be held in a more proper formatting that would fit for future seasons when it became the National Basketball League instead, where the two best teams in each division compete against each other in a best of three series before the winners of those two rounds would meet up for the second MBC championship ever held.

The final MBC Playoffs ever held by the Midwest Basketball Conference under that name showcased the top two Eastern Division teams in the new works team in Akron, with the Akron Goodyear Wingfoots going up against their inner city rival works team, the older Akron Firestone Non-Skids. The Western Division saw the rebranded Dayton London Bobbys go up against a third works team that became a part of the MBC, the Fort Wayne General Electrics, to see who would meet up in the championship round.

For this season, the Goodyear Wingfoots team would sweep the Firestone Non-Skids team 2–0, while the Fort Wayne General Electrics saw themselves enter the championship round due to a controversial 2–1 series win due to the Dayton London Bobbys declaring that they would forfeit the third and final game of the series to Fort Wayne without any warning or explanation hours before the decisive game was set to begin.

Regardless of the reason Dayton forfeited their series to Fort Wayne, the championship series for the final MBC season of play would involve two of the three remaining works teams left in the league's championship series, the Akron Goodyear Wingfoots and the Fort Wayne General Electrics. The second and final MBC championship would end with the Goodyear Wingfoots sweeping the General Electrics 2–0 to become the second and final MBC champions in that league's short tenure of existence, before it rebranded itself to the National Basketball League on October 6, 1937.

MBC Division Playoffs
E1	Akron Goodyear Wingfoots	2
E2	Akron Firestone Non-Skids	0
W1	Dayton London Bobbys	1
W2	Fort Wayne General Electrics	2*

MBC Championship
E1	Akron Goodyear Wingfoots	2
W2	Fort Wayne General Electrics	0

- Bold Series winner
- * – Game 3 of the Western Division Playoffs would result in a 2–0 forfeiture by the Dayton London Bobbys losing the series to the Fort Wayne General Electrics for unknown reasons hours before their decisive game of the series was set to begin.

== Leading scorers ==
Prior to the 1969–70 NBA season, league leaders in points were determined by totals rather than averages. Also, rebounding and assist numbers were not recorded properly in the MBC like they would be in the BAA/NBA, as would field goal and free-throw shooting percentages. With that being said, due to the Midwest Basketball Conference not having a set amount of standardized games played for each team this season, there would be no true set scoring leader for the MBC this season, with a few players having an incomplete set amount of data for one reason or another. However, the player that scored the most points in the MBC this season was Jack Shaffer for the Akron Firestone Non-Skids, with him also being the only player to average more than 10 points per game, with an average of 10.3 points per game in sixteen games played.

== See also ==
- National Basketball League (United States)
