= 1936–37 Whiting Ciesar All-Americans season =

MBC professional basketball team season

- League: Midwest Basketball Conference
- Head coach: Whitey Wickhorst
- General manager: Edward "Eddie" Ciesar
- Owner(s): Edward "Eddie" Ciesar
- Arena: Whiting Community Center

Results
- Record: 3–5 (.375)
- Place: Division: 3rd (Western)
- Playoff finish: Did not qualify

The 1936–37 Whiting Ciesar All-Americans season was the first (and technically only) professional basketball season of play for the Whiting Ciesar All-Americans in the small city of Whiting, Indiana under the Midwest Basketball Conference (MBC), which was also the second and final year that league existed before it technically folded operations due to the MBC rebranding itself into the United States' National Basketball League (NBL) for its following season of play. However, if you include their brief time as an independent team before later joining the Midwest Basketball Conference in its second and final season of existence, this would officially be considered at least their second season of existence as a team. The Whiting Ciesar All-Americans team that was created by local car salesman Eddie Ciesar as a means to help promote his local car selling business at the time were one of five new teams to officially enter the MBC this season after seeing the positive reception the MBC had in its first season of operations. As a result of that fact, twelve teams competed in the MBC this time around, six teams in each of the Eastern Division (though it originally started out as five teams in that division at first) and the Western Division (including Whiting and the inaugural, defending champion Chicago Duffy Florals).

One of the rules implemented during this season due to the controversial manner on the Chicago Duffy Florals not only entering the playoffs, but later being named the inaugural league champions not long afterward was that the required number of games played during the regular season would be decreased from twelve to eight games in order to avoid having a repeat scenario like that occur during the season. In one sense, it would technically benefit the Ciesar All-Americans since they would barely qualify for contention in the MBC playoffs if their record warranted such a thing. Unfortunately for Whiting, their record would barely not qualify in that case, as their record for this season would be a below-average 3–5, which would be a couple games shy from overtaking the Fort Wayne General Electrics for the second place spot in the Western Division for this season. Not only that, but they could also technically be considered tied for third place in their division with the Chicago Duffy Florals, who finished their season with a much more disappointing 4–7 record (though their .364 win percentage would be seen as a worse overall win percentage than Whiting's .375 win percentage). In any case, following the season's conclusion, the Midwest Basketball Conference would revamp itself into the National Basketball League, which eventually became a league that would merge with the future rivaling Basketball Association of America to become the National Basketball Association for the present-day era.

== Roster ==
Due to information on Midwest Basketball Conference players being generally hard to find, there are bound to be more gaps and/or inaccuracies found in certain areas on the team's roster spots than usual.

Player	Position
Tony Carp	C
Bill Haarlow	G-F
Vince McGowan	F-C
Joe Reiff	F-C
Swede Roos	G
Joe Stack	G
Will Senchak	G-F
Joe Sotak	F-C
Whitey Wickhorst	G

== MBC Standings ==
=== MBC Eastern Division ===
Pos.	Eastern Division	Wins	Losses	Win %
1	Akron Goodyear Wingfoots	16	2	.889
2	Akron Firestone Non-Skids	13	5	.722
3	Warren HyVis Oils	8	6	.571
4	Columbus Athletic Supply	6	5	.545
5	Detroit Altes Lagers	2	8	.200
6	Pittsburgh Y.M.H.A.	2	9	.182

=== MBC Western Division ===
Pos.	Western Division	Wins	Losses	Win %
1	Dayton London Bobbys	8	6	.571
2	Fort Wayne General Electrics	6	6	.500
3	Whiting Ciesar All-Americans	3	5	.375
4	Chicago Duffy Florals	4	7	.364
5	Indianapolis Kautskys	2	5	.286
6	Indianapolis U.S. Tires	3	9	.250
