= 1936–37 Akron Firestone Non-Skids season =

MBC professional basketball team season

- League: Midwest Basketball Conference
- Head coach: Paul Sheeks
- Owner(s): Firestone
- Arena: Firestone Clubhouse

Results
- Record: 13–5 (.722)
- Place: Division: 2nd (Eastern)
- Playoff finish: Lost MBC Division Playoffs to Akron Goodyear Wingfoots, 2–0

The 1936–37 Akron Firestone Non-Skids season was the Firestone Non-Skids' second and final year in the Midwest Basketball Conference (MBC), which was also the second and final year that league existed before it technically folded operations due to the MBC rebranding itself into the United States' National Basketball League (NBL) for its following season of play. However, if one were to include their previous seasons of play in the precursor of sorts to the MBC/NBL called the National Professional Basketball League and the couple of independent seasons of play they had before the previous season of play they had in the Midwest Basketball Conference, this would officially be (at least) their fifth season of play instead. Twelve teams competed in the MBC this time around, six teams in each of the Eastern Division (Akron Firestone's division) and in the Western Division (including the inaugural, defending champion Chicago Duffy Florals). The Non-Skids were one of two teams from Akron, Ohio in the league, with the other team also being considered a works team in the Akron Goodyear Wingfoots, who decided to join the MBC as a later entry to this season after previously not entering the MBC at all during its previous season following some positive results the Goodyear team had early on in their exhibition season matches for this season.

Entering this season, the Firestone Non-Skids would look to bounce back and try to become champions in their own league they helped create after having a disappointing end to the previous season with the upset loss they had in the inaugural round-robin tournament to the eventual champions in the Chicago Duffy Florals. In the newly-expanded Midwest Basketball Conference, the Firestone squad would see themselves as one of the best squads in their league once again, though they would not lead their division this time around due to their inner city work team rivals in the Akron Goodyear Wingfoots becoming one of the best teams in the league this season by comparison after Goodyear joined the MBC this time around. Despite them not leading the Eastern Division this time around, the Firestone Non-Skids would still end up qualifying for the MBC Playoffs once again by having the second-best record in the Eastern Division with a 13–5 record, being three games behind the rivaling Goodyear squad for first place in their division. However, due to the structure of the newly created format for the MBC Playoffs this time around after the original round-robin tournament structure for the inaugural season was kind of a dud on their ends, the Firestone squad had no choice but to compete against the Goodyear squad in the newly-created semifinal round for the MBC's playoffs this time around. Unfortunately for the Firestone squad, they would end up being swept by the eventual champions in the rivaling Goodyear Wingfoots, with this being the final season played in the Midwest Basketball Conference before it got rebranded into the National Basketball League for the following season of play going forward due to the teams involved there wanting a greater reach with their league.

== Roster ==
Due to information on Midwest Basketball Conference players being generally hard to find, there are bound to be more gaps and/or inaccuracies found in certain areas on the team's roster spots than usual.

1936–37 Akron Firestone Non-Skids roster
Players

Pos.	No.	Player	Height	Weight	DOB	From
F		Wesley Bennett	6 ft 3 in (1.91 m)	175 lb (79 kg)	1913–03–31	Westminster (PA)
C		Beanie Berens	6 ft 5 in (1.96 m)	190 lb (86 kg)	1913–02–26	Ohio
G		Soup Cable	6 ft 3 in (1.91 m)	200 lb (91 kg)	1913–04–04	West HS (OH)
F/C		Shang Chadwick	6 ft 5 in (1.96 m)	220 lb (100 kg)	1901–06–09	Wabash College
G		Ray Dickerson	6 ft 0 in (1.83 m)	165 lb (75 kg)	1908–06–15	Northeastern State
F/C		Ed Garner	6 ft 3 in (1.91 m)	200 lb (91 kg)	1912–08–14	Northwest Missouri State
F/C		Ward Meyers	6 ft 1 in (1.85 m)	185 lb (84 kg)	1908–04–19	Unknown
G		Bill Reeves	5 ft 10 in (1.78 m)	165 lb (75 kg)	1904–12–05	Central (IN)
F/C		Jack Shaffer	6 ft 3 in (1.91 m)	190 lb (86 kg)	1909–08–13	DePaul
C		Slim Shoun	6 ft 11 in (2.11 m)	210 lb (95 kg)	1904–10–04	Carson–Newman
G		Paul Tobin	5 ft 9 in (1.75 m)	170 lb (77 kg)	1909–11–23	West HS (OH)
G/F		Warren Whitlinger	5 ft 9 in (1.75 m)	170 lb (77 kg)	1914–04–04	Ohio State

Coaches
Head coach
- Paul Sheeks

Legend
- (DP) Unsigned draft pick
- (FA) Free agent
- (S) Suspended
- Injured

Note: Wesley Bennett, Ray Dickerson, and Paul Tobin were all not a part of the MBC Playoff roster for one reason or another.

== MBC Standings ==
=== MBC Eastern Division ===
Pos.	Eastern Division	Wins	Losses	Win %
1	Akron Goodyear Wingfoots	16	2	.889
2	Akron Firestone Non-Skids	13	5	.722
3	Warren HyVis Oils	8	6	.571
4	Columbus Athletic Supply	6	5	.545
5	Detroit Altes Lagers	2	8	.200
6	Pittsburgh Y.M.H.A.	2	9	.182

=== MBC Western Division ===
Pos.	Western Division	Wins	Losses	Win %
1	Dayton London Bobbys	8	6	.571
2	Fort Wayne General Electrics	6	6	.500
3	Whiting Ciesar All-Americans	3	5	.375
4	Chicago Duffy Florals	4	7	.364
5	Indianapolis Kautskys	2	5	.286
6	Indianapolis U.S. Tires	3	9	.250

== MBC Playoffs ==
=== MBC Eastern Division Playoffs ===
(E2) Akron Firestone Non-Skids vs. (E1) Akron Goodyear Wingfoots: Goodyear Wingfoots win series 2–0

- Game 1 @ Goodyear: Goodyear Wingfoots 36, Firestone Non-Skids 24
- Game 2 @ Firestone: Goodyear Wingfoots 40, Firestone Non-Skids 24
