= 1936–37 Pittsburgh Y.M.H.A. season =

MBC professional basketball team season

- League: Midwest Basketball Conference
- Head coach: Harry Menzel
- Owner(s): Young Men's Hebrew Association of Pittsburgh; Meyer "Buck" Gefsky
- Arena: Pittsburgh Y.M.H.A. Gym

Results
- Record: 2–9 (.182)
- Place: Division: 6th (Eastern)
- Playoff finish: Did not qualify

The 1936–37 Pittsburgh Y.M.H.A. season was the second and final professional basketball season of play for the Pittsburgh Y.M.H.A. team in the city of Pittsburgh, Pennsylvania under the Midwest Basketball Conference (MBC), which was also the second and final year that league existed before it technically folded operations due to the MBC rebranding itself into the United States' National Basketball League (NBL) for its following season of play. However, if one were to include the independent seasons of play that they had when they were operating as an amateur team from Pittsburgh's own local Young Men's Hebrew Association all the way back in 1931 as the Pittsburgh Y.M.H.A. (sometimes being called the Pittsburgh Y.M.H.A.s or Pittsburgh Y.M.H.A.'s), this would be their sixth and final season of play under that name before later rebranding themselves as a professional basketball franchise under the Pittsburgh Pirates name honoring the Major League Baseball team of the same name. Twelve teams competed in the MBC this time around, six in each of the Eastern Division (Pittsburgh's division) and the Western Division (including the inaugural, defending champion Chicago Duffy Florals).

Entering this season, Pittsburgh sought to return to the playoff picture in the MBC, which would be reformatted into a regular playoff format after the inaugural MBC season had them compete in a round-robin tournament format that resulted in Pittsburgh's team finishing in last place under that specific tournament formatting. Interestingly, they would try to do so with a new head coach instead, as Meyer "Buck" Gefsky would be replaced with Harry Menzel for this season instead. Unfortunately for them, despite having mostly the same roster from the previous season going into this season of play, they would not have the same quality of strength as a team this season as they did the previous season, as they ended up being the worst team in the entire league that season this time around with a 2–9 record instead, easily failing to qualify for the MBC's reformatted playoffs this time around. Following the season's conclusion, the Midwest Basketball Conference would revamp itself into the National Basketball League, which eventually became a league that would merge with the future rivaling Basketball Association of America to become the National Basketball Association for the present-day era, with the Pittsburgh Y.M.H.A. rebranding themselves from their Young Men's Hebrew Association roots in order to expand their player approval rights into having more races and religious creeds beyond the Jewish religion join their team by becoming the professional basketball version of the Pittsburgh Pirates once they entered the NBL.

== Roster ==
Due to information on Midwest Basketball Conference players being generally hard to find, there are bound to be more gaps and/or inaccuracies found in certain areas on the team's roster spots than usual.

1936–37 Pittsburgh Y.M.H.A. roster
Players

Pos.	No.	Player	Height	Weight	DOB	From
G		Ganzy Benedict	5 ft 9 in (1.75 m)	165 lb (75 kg)	1905–11–29	Duquesne
F/C		Irv Brenner	6 ft 4 in (1.93 m)	200 lb (91 kg)	1913–05–30	Duquesne
F/C		Claire Cribbs	6 ft 3 in (1.91 m)	195 lb (88 kg)	1912–08–13	Pittsburgh
G/F		Art Feldman	6 ft 1 in (1.85 m)	170 lb (77 kg)	1912–10–18	Duquesne
G		Hymie Ginsburg	5 ft 9 in (1.75 m)	170 lb (77 kg)	1914–03–23	Geneva
C		Cliff Hutzley	6 ft 5 in (1.96 m)	200 lb (91 kg)	1911–08–29	Geneva
G/F		Art Hyatt	6 ft 2 in (1.88 m)	195 lb (88 kg)	1912–06–29	Schenley HS (PA)
G		Stub Jacobson	5 ft 10 in (1.78 m)	165 lb (75 kg)	1916–08–25	Carnegie Mellon
G		Dudey Moore	5 ft 9 in (1.75 m)	180 lb (82 kg)	1910–04–05	Duquesne
G		Marty Reiter	5 ft 7 in (1.70 m)	160 lb (73 kg)	1911–08–25	Duquesne
G		Red Silverman	5 ft 8 in (1.73 m)	160 lb (73 kg)	1910–10–15	Carnegie Mellon
C		Joe Stydahar	6 ft 4 in (1.93 m)	235 lb (107 kg)	1912–03–17	West Virginia

Coaches
Head coach
- Harry Menzel

Legend
- (DP) Unsigned draft pick
- (FA) Free agent
- (S) Suspended
- Injured

== MBC Standings ==
=== MBC Eastern Division ===
Pos.	Eastern Division	Wins	Losses	Win %
1	Akron Goodyear Wingfoots	16	2	.889
2	Akron Firestone Non-Skids	13	5	.722
3	Warren HyVis Oils	8	6	.571
4	Columbus Athletic Supply	6	5	.545
5	Detroit Altes Lagers	2	8	.200
6	Pittsburgh Y.M.H.A.	2	9	.182

=== MBC Western Division ===
Pos.	Western Division	Wins	Losses	Win %
1	Dayton London Bobbys	8	6	.571
2	Fort Wayne General Electrics	6	6	.500
3	Whiting Ciesar All-Americans	3	5	.375
4	Chicago Duffy Florals	4	7	.364
5	Indianapolis Kautskys	2	5	.286
6	Indianapolis U.S. Tires	3	9	.250
