= 1936–37 Warren HyVis Oils season =

MBC professional basketball team season

- League: Midwest Basketball Conference
- Head coach: Gerry Archibald (player-coach)
- Owner(s): Gerry Archibald
- Arena: Beaty Jr. High Gym

Results
- Record: 8–6 (.571)
- Place: Division: 3rd (Eastern)
- Playoff finish: Did not qualify

The 1936–37 Warren HyVis Oils season was the first (and only) professional basketball season of play (though the MBC would be seen as either an amateur or semi-pro basketball league by most basketball historians) for the Warren Hyvis Oils (sometimes referred to as the Warren HyVis Oilers in the small town of Warren, Pennsylvania at the Beaty Jr. High Gym within the Warren County School District under the Midwest Basketball Conference (MBC), which was also the second and final year that league existed before it technically folded operations due to the MBC rebranding itself into the United States' National Basketball League (NBL) for its following season of play. However, if one were to include their previous seasons where they first started out as a team in the Central Basketball League called the Warren Buckeyes back in 1926 before becoming an independent team called the Warren Crescents, the Corry Keystones of the short-lived original NYPBL, the Warren Merchants, and the Warren Transits before becoming the Warren HyVis Oils (sometimes being expanded out more into the Warren HyVis Oilers instead) up until joining the MBC for this season of play, this would officially be the franchise's twelfth season of existence as a team. In any case, Warren's squad would be one of five new teams to join the MBC this season due to some clever marketing and promotional dealership work out of team owner, general manager, and player-coach Gerry Archibald. In part because of Archibald's work behind the scenes, twelve teams ended up competing in the MBC this time around, six teams in each of the Eastern Division (Warren's division) and the Western Division (including the inaugural, defending champion Chicago Duffy Florals).

Had this team been competing in the Western Division instead of the Eastern Division this season, the Warren HyVis Oils (or Warren HyVis Oilers) would have ended up qualifying as a playoff team this season since they ended their season with a winning record. However, because Warren ended up competing in the Eastern Division this season due to the city of Warren, Pennsylvania being eastbound alongside nearby Pittsburgh, Warren's above-average 8–6 record would only be good enough for a third place finish within the Eastern Division, which would still be behind both of Akron, Ohio's own works teams in the Akron Firestone Non-Skids and the eventual champion Akron Goodyear Wingfoots. That placement in their division meant they would fail to qualify for the MBC playoffs this season. Following the season's conclusion, the Midwest Basketball Conference would revamp itself into the National Basketball League, which eventually became a league that would merge with the future rivaling Basketball Association of America to become the National Basketball Association for the present-day era. Not only that, but Warren would rebrand their franchise from the Warren HyVis Oils (or Warren HyVis Oilers) into the Warren Penns, though Archibald would continue keeping his partnership with HyVis (Penn) Oil following the league change that following season due to the clever name change he used to still reflect the brand for the team in the future.

== Roster ==
Due to information on Midwest Basketball Conference players being generally hard to find, there are bound to be more gaps and/or inaccuracies found in certain areas on the team's roster spots than usual.

Player	Position
Gerry Archibald	G
Sam Forscey	F-G
Manny Hyatt	G
Bill Holland	C
Joe Leson	G-F
Fran Maury	G
Johnny Pawk	F-C
Walt Stanky	F-C

== MBC Standings ==
=== MBC Eastern Division ===
Pos.	Eastern Division	Wins	Losses	Win %
1	Akron Goodyear Wingfoots	16	2	.889
2	Akron Firestone Non-Skids	13	5	.722
3	Warren HyVis Oils	8	6	.571
4	Columbus Athletic Supply	6	5	.545
5	Detroit Altes Lagers	2	8	.200
6	Pittsburgh Y.M.H.A.	2	9	.182

=== MBC Western Division ===
Pos.	Western Division	Wins	Losses	Win %
1	Dayton London Bobbys	8	6	.571
2	Fort Wayne General Electrics	6	6	.500
3	Whiting Ciesar All-Americans	3	5	.375
4	Chicago Duffy Florals	4	7	.364
5	Indianapolis Kautskys	2	5	.286
6	Indianapolis U.S. Tires	3	9	.250
