= 1936–37 Indianapolis Kautskys season =

MBC professional basketball team season

- League: Midwest Basketball Conference
- Head coach: Frank Kautsky
- General manager: Frank Kautsky
- Owner(s): Frank Kautsky; Pete Bailey
- Arena: Indianapolis Armory; Pennsy Gym

Results
- Record: 2–5 (.286)
- Place: Division: 5th (Western)
- Playoff finish: Did not qualify (Would not play over 8 games this season.)

The 1936–37 Indianapolis Kautskys season was the second and final semi-professional basketball season of play that the Kautskys franchise would utilize their name for their team, but also played in the Midwest Basketball Conference (MBC), which was also the second and final year that league existed before it technically folded operations due to the MBC rebranding itself into the United States' National Basketball League (NBL) for its following season of play. However, if one were to include the independent seasons of play that they had alongside their sole season in the original National Professional Basketball League that they played in as well as their previous season in the Midwest Basketball Conference, this season would be considered (at least) their fourth season of play. This would also be their final season where they would play in the smaller Indianapolis Armory before moving into the present-day Hinkle Fieldhouse for the rest of their existence going forward. Twelve teams competed in the MBC this time around, six teams in each of the Eastern Division and in the Western Division (which included both the Kautskys and the inaugural, defending champion Chicago Duffy Florals). This would also be one of the final seasons of play for Hall of Famer John Wooden as a player while being a part of the Kautskys before he became a legendary head coach for the UCLA Bruins.

Entering this season, Indianapolis sought to return to the playoff picture in the MBC, which would be reformatted into a regular playoff format after the inaugural season had them compete in a round-robin tournament format that resulted in them finishing as runners-up to the Chicago Duffy Florals. Because of the controversial manner on the Duffy Florals not only entering the playoffs, but later being named the inaugural league champions not long afterward, the Kautskys would end up voting to lower the required number of games played in a season in order to avoid having a repeat scenario like that occur during the season. Despite their rule change, however, the Kautskys would ironically be the only MBC team this season to not qualify for the MBC's new playoff format at hand, regardless of their final results at hand (which were still poor all the same), due to the fact that the Kautskys themselves would have a hard time trying to schedule any games for themselves while also adhering to the players' own work schedules at hand outside of the team during this season. Following the season's conclusion, the Midwest Basketball Conference would revamp itself into the National Basketball League, which eventually became a league that would merge with the future rivaling Basketball Association of America to become the National Basketball Association for the present-day era, with Indianapolis being the only team from the MBC's days to ultimately play for the BAA/NBA in its history. Not only that, but following this season's conclusion, the Kautskys would merge their operations with the neighboring Indianapolis U.S. Tires franchise (a team sponsored by U.S. Tire, Inc. at the time), with the Kautskys keeping their history and franchise operations in the process once they went from the MBC to the NBL.

== Roster ==
Due to information on Midwest Basketball Conference players being generally hard to find, there are bound to be more gaps and/or inaccuracies found in certain areas on the team's roster spots than usual.

1936–37 Indianapolis Kautskys roster
Players

Pos.	No.	Player	Height	Weight	DOB	From
G/F		Frank Baird	5 ft 11 in (1.80 m)	160 lb (73 kg)	1912–04–10	Butler
G/F		Herm Bottema	6 ft 3 in (1.91 m)	180 lb (82 kg)	1912–04–11	Arsenal Technical HS (IN)
F/C		George Chestnut	6 ft 5 in (1.96 m)	210 lb (95 kg)	1911–09–27	Indiana State
G/F		Robert Kessler	6 ft 0 in (1.83 m)	165 lb (75 kg)	1914–11–25	Purdue
G		Austin Lambert	6 ft 1 in (1.85 m)	180 lb (82 kg)	1912–11–13	Purdue
F/C		Johnny Miklozek	6 ft 6 in (1.98 m)	210 lb (95 kg)	1912–09–14	Indiana State
F		Cy Proffitt	6 ft 3 in (1.91 m)	190 lb (86 kg)	1911–10–26	Butler
G		Marvin Stout	5 ft 11 in (1.80 m)	155 lb (70 kg)	1915–08–06	Ball State
G/F		John Wooden	5 ft 10 in (1.78 m)	185 lb (84 kg)	1910–10–14	Purdue

Coaches
Head coach
- Frank Kautsky

Legend
- (DP) Unsigned draft pick
- (FA) Free agent
- (S) Suspended
- Injured

There would also be a guard with the last name of Butler playing for the team for a game as well (presumably named George Butler).

== MBC Standings ==
=== MBC Eastern Division ===
Pos.	Eastern Division	Wins	Losses	Win %
1	Akron Goodyear Wingfoots	16	2	.889
2	Akron Firestone Non-Skids	13	5	.722
3	Warren HyVis Oils	8	6	.571
4	Columbus Athletic Supply	6	5	.545
5	Detroit Altes Lagers	2	8	.200
6	Pittsburgh Y.M.H.A.	2	9	.182

=== MBC Western Division ===
Pos.	Western Division	Wins	Losses	Win %
1	Dayton London Bobbys	8	6	.571
2	Fort Wayne General Electrics	6	6	.500
3	Whiting Ciesar All-Americans	3	5	.375
4	Chicago Duffy Florals	4	7	.364
5	Indianapolis Kautskys	2	5	.286
6	Indianapolis U.S. Tires	3	9	.250
