= Shaddock =

Shaddock may refer to:

- Pomelo, fruit Citrus maxima
- NATO codenames for Soviet missiles:
  - P-5 Pyatyorka (SS-N-3 Shaddock)
  - SPU-35V Redut (SSC-1B Shaddock)

== People ==
- Bob Shaddock (1920–1991), American professional basketball player

== See also ==
- Les Shadoks animated television series from France
- Shad, fish subfamily Alosinae
