= 1936–37 Akron Goodyear Wingfoots season =

MBC professional basketball team champion season

- League champions
- Division champions
- League: Midwest Basketball Conference
- Head coach: Lefty Byers
- Owner(s): Goodyear
- Arena: Goodyear Hall

Results
- Record: 16–2 (.889)
- Place: Division: 1st (Eastern)
- Playoff finish: MBC Champions (Won 2–0 over Fort Wayne General Electrics)

The 1936–37 Akron Goodyear Wingfoots season was the Goodyear Wingfoots' only year in the Midwest Basketball Conference (MBC), which was also the second and final year that league existed before it technically folded operations due to the MBC rebranding itself into the United States' National Basketball League (NBL) for its following season of play. However, if you include their previous seasons of existence as an independent team, alongside seasons where they competed in the Amateur Athletic Union, the National Industrial League (not to be confused with the National Industrial Basketball League that they would later compete in, with the Goodyear Wingfoots winning a championship in the NIL in 1932), and what could be considered to be the predecessor to the MBC/NBL in the National Professional Basketball League before joining the Midwest Basketball Conference this season, this season would officially be considered their 19th season of play as a team. Twelve teams competed in the MBC this time around, six teams in each of the Eastern Division (Akron Goodyear's division) and the Western Division (including the inaugural, defending champion Chicago Duffy Florals). The Wingfoots were one of two teams from Akron, Ohio in the league, with the other team also being considered a works team in the Akron Firestone Non-Skids.

While the Goodyear Wingfoots did not enter this season as a member of the Midwest Basketball Conference at first, after starting out the season rather strongly with positive results through exhibition matches played throughout the season (notably with splitting matches played against the University of Pittsburgh team), the Goodyear squad would decide to enter the MBC some time in December 1936 as the last MBC team to enter the league there (with Lefty Byers being hired to coach the team once joining the MBC following Smiley Weltner becoming an assistant recreational director for the Goodyear company), competing in the same league as the rivaling Akron Firestone Non-Skids once again for the first time since they originally competed in the short-lived National Professional Basketball League for the 1932–33 season before that league went defunct (at least due in part to the Great Depression). Once they joined the MBC properly, the Goodyear squad would start the season with a 4–0 record and an 8–0 divisional record, clearly leading the rest of that conference league by comparison (later going 12–1 at one point in time) to end the season with a 16–2 record for first place in the Eastern Division. Under a revised playoff format, the two Akron teams would meet each other in the Divisional Playoffs in a best of three series before the winner later got to compete in a best of three championship series. For the Goodyear Wingfoots, they would not only sweep their inner city rivals in the Akron Firestone Non-Skids works team 2–0 in the Eastern Division Playoff, but also later sweep the Fort Wayne General Electrics works team 2–0 in the final MBC championship series held. Following the season's conclusion, the Midwest Basketball Conference would revamp itself into the National Basketball League, which eventually became a league that would merge with the future rivaling Basketball Association of America to become the National Basketball Association for the present-day era. Additionally, if one were to include this MBC championship with future NBL champions won throughout his career, Charley Shipp (who had previously played in the MBC with the Indianapolis U.S. Tires) would be the player to have the most championships won within the MBC and NBL together with five overall championships won. This season was also notable for featuring future NBL star player Charley Shipp, who had previously played for the MBC's Indianapolis U.S. Tires team alongside Leroy Edwards in its inaugural season of play before eventually having a storied NBL career of his own with multiple championships there not long afterward; Shipp and Edwards would end up being the only two players in MBC/NBL history to play throughout all fourteen seasons of that league's combined existence before it eventually merged with the BAA to become the NBA in 1949.

== Roster ==
Due to information on Midwest Basketball Conference players being generally hard to find, there are bound to be more gaps and/or inaccuracies found in certain areas on the team's roster spots than usual.

1936–37 Akron Goodyear Wingfoots roster
Players

Pos.	No.	Player	Height	Weight	DOB	From
G		Chuck Bloedorn	6 ft 0 in (1.83 m)	180 lb (82 kg)	1912–05–28	Illinois Tech
F/C		Blackie Conrad	6 ft 4 in (1.93 m)	210 lb (95 kg)	1911–10–05	Ohio State
F/C		Robert Cope	6 ft 4 in (1.93 m)	190 lb (86 kg)	1911–09–03	Mount Union
F/C		Ralph Crowton	6 ft 6 in (1.98 m)	200 lb (91 kg)	1916–08–02	BYU
G/F		Howard Ginaven	6 ft 2 in (1.88 m)	200 lb (91 kg)	1910–08–01	Ohio Wesleyan
G		Lou Harmon	5 ft 9 in (1.75 m)	155 lb (70 kg)	1910–09–11	Purdue
F/C		Al Lauchiskis	6 ft 4 in (1.93 m)	200 lb (91 kg)	1914–12–06	Armour Institute of Technology
F/C		Ray Morstadt	6 ft 2 in (1.88 m)	220 lb (100 kg)	1913–03–10	Marquette
F		Russ Ochsenhirt	6 ft 3 in (1.91 m)	195 lb (88 kg)	1912–04–16	Pittsburgh
G		Joe Popeko	5 ft 10 in (1.78 m)	160 lb (73 kg)	1910–03–20	Mercer
F/C		Bob Preusse	6 ft 5 in (1.96 m)	195 lb (88 kg)	1910–02–21	Akron
F		Mal Rush	6 ft 0 in (1.83 m)	170 lb (77 kg)	1909–04–02	Bethany (WV)
G/F		Charley Shipp	6 ft 1 in (1.85 m)	200 lb (91 kg)	1913–12–03	Catholic
G/F		Chelso Tamagno	5 ft 10 in (1.78 m)	185 lb (84 kg)	1912–03–20	Michigan
G		Melvin Windland	6 ft 2 in (1.88 m)	205 lb (93 kg)	1912–12–19	Mount Union

Coaches
Head coach
- Lefty Byers

Legend
- (DP) Unsigned draft pick
- (FA) Free agent
- (S) Suspended
- Injured

Note: Ralph Crowton, Howard Ginaven, Lou Harmon, Joe Popeko, Bob Preusse, and Melvin Windland would not take part in the MBC Playoffs this season, while Chelso Tamagno would only play with the team while participating in the MBC Playoffs this season.

== MBC Standings ==
=== MBC Eastern Division ===
Pos.	Eastern Division	Wins	Losses	Win %
1	Akron Goodyear Wingfoots	16	2	.889
2	Akron Firestone Non-Skids	13	5	.722
3	Warren HyVis Oils	8	6	.571
4	Columbus Athletic Supply	6	5	.545
5	Detroit Altes Lagers	2	8	.200
6	Pittsburgh Y.M.H.A.	2	9	.182

=== MBC Western Division ===
Pos.	Western Division	Wins	Losses	Win %
1	Dayton London Bobbys	8	6	.571
2	Fort Wayne General Electrics	6	6	.500
3	Whiting Ciesar All-Americans	3	5	.375
4	Chicago Duffy Florals	4	7	.364
5	Indianapolis Kautskys	2	5	.286
6	Indianapolis U.S. Tires	3	9	.250

== MBC Playoffs ==
=== MBC Eastern Division Playoffs ===
(E1) Akron Goodyear Wingfoots vs. (E2) Akron Firestone Non-Skids: Goodyear Wingfoots win series 2–0

- Game 1 @ Goodyear: Goodyear Wingfoots 36, Firestone Non-Skids 24
- Game 2 @ Firestone: Goodyear Wingfoots 40, Firestone Non-Skids 24

=== MBC Championship ===
(E1) Akron Goodyear Wingfoots vs. (W2) Fort Wayne General Electrics: Akron wins series 2–0

- Game 1 @ Akron: Akron 28, Fort Wayne 22
- Game 2 @ Fort Wayne: Akron 27, Fort Wayne 24
