= Purcell High School =

Purcell High School may refer to:

- Purcell High School, Cincinnati, now Purcell Marian High School
- Purcell High School (Oklahoma), Purcell, Oklahoma

== See also ==
- Purcell School, UK
