= Gene Mechling =

American basketball player

Personal information
- Born: March 24, 1909 Hopewell, Ohio
- Died: January 26, 1975 (aged 65) Venice, Florida
- Listed height: 6 ft 1 in (1.85 m)
- Listed weight: 215 lb (98 kg)

Career information
- High school: Glenford (Glenford, Ohio)
- College: Capital (1929–1932)
- Playing career: 1931–1939
- Position: Guard

Career history
- 1931–1932: Hebron Gassers
- 1931–1932: Newark Sterling Oils
- 1932–1935: Cochocton Buckeyes
- 1935–1936: Lancaster
- 1935–1937: Dayton Metropolitans
- 1938: Cincinnati Comellos
- 1938–1939: Dayton Hall's Laundry

Homer Eugene Mechling (March 24, 1909 – January 26, 1975) was an American professional basketball player. He played in the National Basketball League for the Cincinnati Comellos during the 1937–38 season and averaged 6.0 points per game.
