= Glenford Bank =

- U.S. National Register of Historic Places
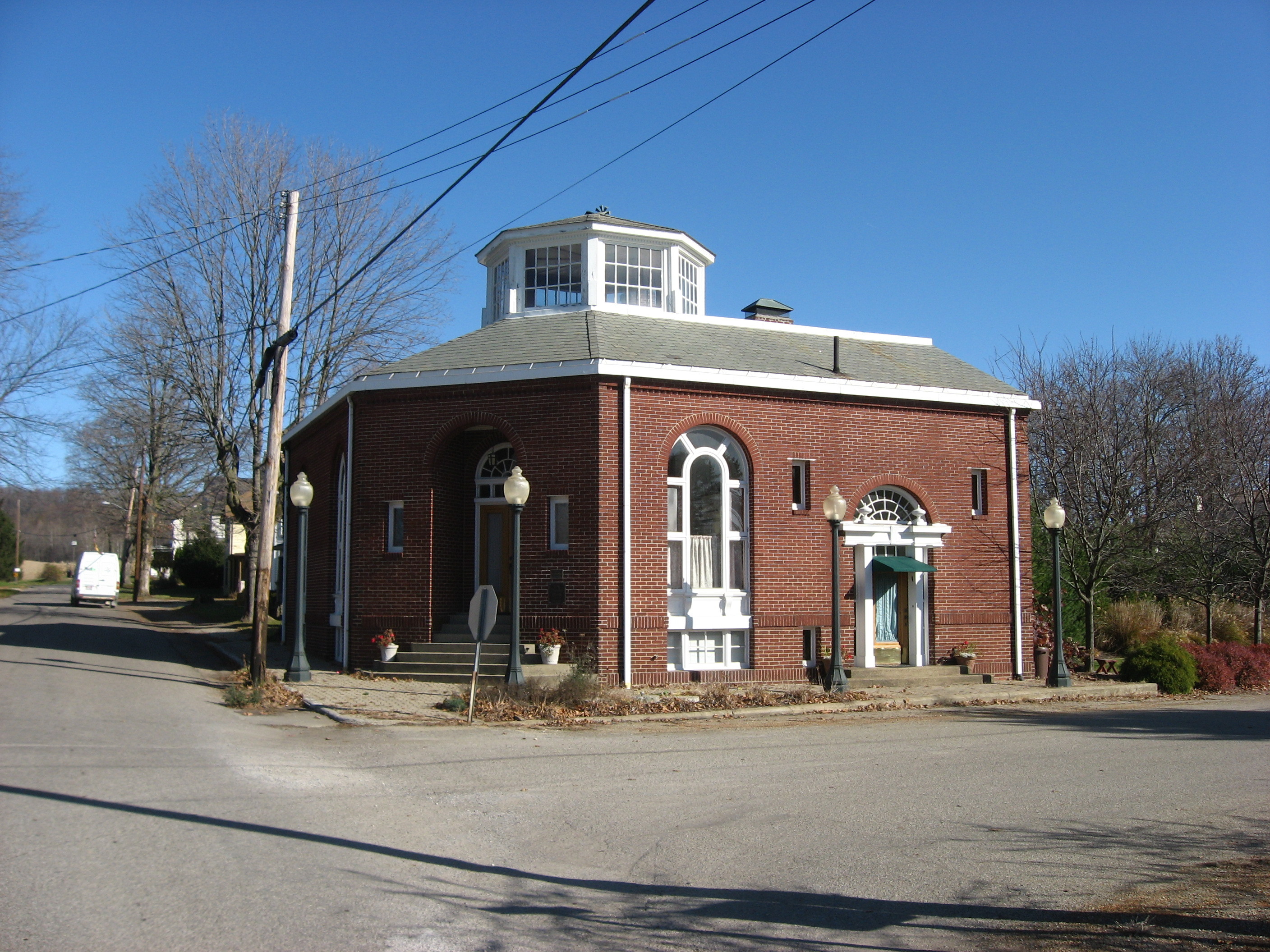
- Southern side of the bank

- Location within Ohio Location within the United States
- Location: Main and Broad Sts., Glenford, Ohio
- Coordinates: 39°53′19″N 82°19′5″W
- Area: Less than 1 acre (0.40 ha)
- Built: 1919
- Architectural style: Neoclassical
- NRHP reference No.: 90000389
- Added to NRHP: March 9, 1990

The Glenford Bank is a historic bank in the small village of Glenford, Ohio, United States. Built in the early twentieth century, the building has served as a core component of village life for much of its history, and it has been named a historic site because of its distinctive architecture.

== History ==
Glenford was founded early in the nineteenth century, but for much of its early history it was a small crossroads, consisting of an unplatted small mill town at a spot where Jonathans Creek could be forded. It was not until the railroads ran through it that it began to grow. By the 1910s, the village had grown to the point that some thought a bank could take its place in the community; the bank was incorporated in 1916, under the presidency of George Deffenbaugh Orr, and it soon began the construction of the present building. Built in 1919, the bank was situated at the intersection of Main and Broad at the heart of the village. It only operated for little more than a decade before failing in 1932. In later years, it served as a fire station for a time; by the 1960s, it was being used as a community center, and the walls of the main meeting room had been painted to depict scenes from the community's history. In 1987, the owners began to restore the building; performed under the leadership of Central Ohio Technical College professor Whitney Tussing, who operated a historic preservation-oriented architecture practice in Glenford, the project saw the building turned into a residence. In later years, Tussing's work at the bank building attracted coverage with a program airing on HGTV, and Tussing himself has spoken of the bank-to-house project as one of his leading projects.

== Architecture ==
Built of brick on a brick foundation, the bank is covered by a slate roof and features various elements of stone; a single-story rectangular building, its stretcher-bond walls are divided into two bays on some sides and three bays on the others. The main entrance is located in a recessed entryway at one of the corners; concrete steps provide access to the entrance, which features a rounded archway above to its panelled ceiling. A subsidiary entrance is located nearby on the southern side; it features a wooden cornice with Neoclassical ornamental urns, which together separate the transom from the fanlight. The building's exceptional Neoclassical styling is reinforced by the interior, which includes carefully worked oak wood.

== Historic designation ==
In early 1990, three years after Whitney Tussing's restoration project began, the Glenford Bank was listed on the National Register of Historic Places. It qualified for inclusion on the National Register because of its distinctive architecture; the bank is a rare example of Neoclassical styling on a small-town bank from the early twentieth century. One of thirteen National Register-listed locations in Perry County, it is one of two in the Glenford area; the other is the Glenford Fort, a large Hopewellian ceremonial enclosure constructed atop a nearby ridgeline.
