= Stub Jacobson =

American basketball player

Personal information
- Listed height: 6 ft 6 in (1.98 m)
- Position: Center

Career history
- 1937: Warren Penns

Stub Jacobson was an American professional basketball player. He played for the Warren Penns in the National Basketball League for four games early in the 1937–38 season. He averaged 1.5 points per game.

== Career statistics ==
Legend
GP	Games played	FGM	Field goals made
FTM	Free throws made	FTA	Free throws attempted
FT%	Free throw percentage	PTS	Total points
PPG	Points per game	**Bold**	Career high

=== NBL ===
==== Regular season ====
Year	Team	GP	FGM	FTM	PTS	PPG
1937–38	Warren	4	2	2	6	1.5
