= Carl Austing =

American basketball player

Personal information
- Born: April 25, 1910 Ohio
- Died: March 25, 1992 (aged 81)
- Listed height: 6 ft 4 in (1.93 m)

Career information
- College: Cincinnati (1933–1935)
- Position: Forward / center

Career history
- 1936: Ray's Clothiers of Dayton
- 1937: Cincinnati Comellos

Career highlights
- 2× First-team All-Buckeye Athletic Association (1934, 1935); Buckeye Athletic Association MVP (1935)

Carl B. Austing (April 25, 1910 – March 25, 1992) was an American professional basketball player who spent one season in the National Basketball League as a member of the Cincinnati Comellos. He played in five games during the 1937–38 season.

Prior to the NBL, Austing played for the University of Cincinnati.
