= Purcell Marian High School =

School in Cincinnati, Ohio, United States

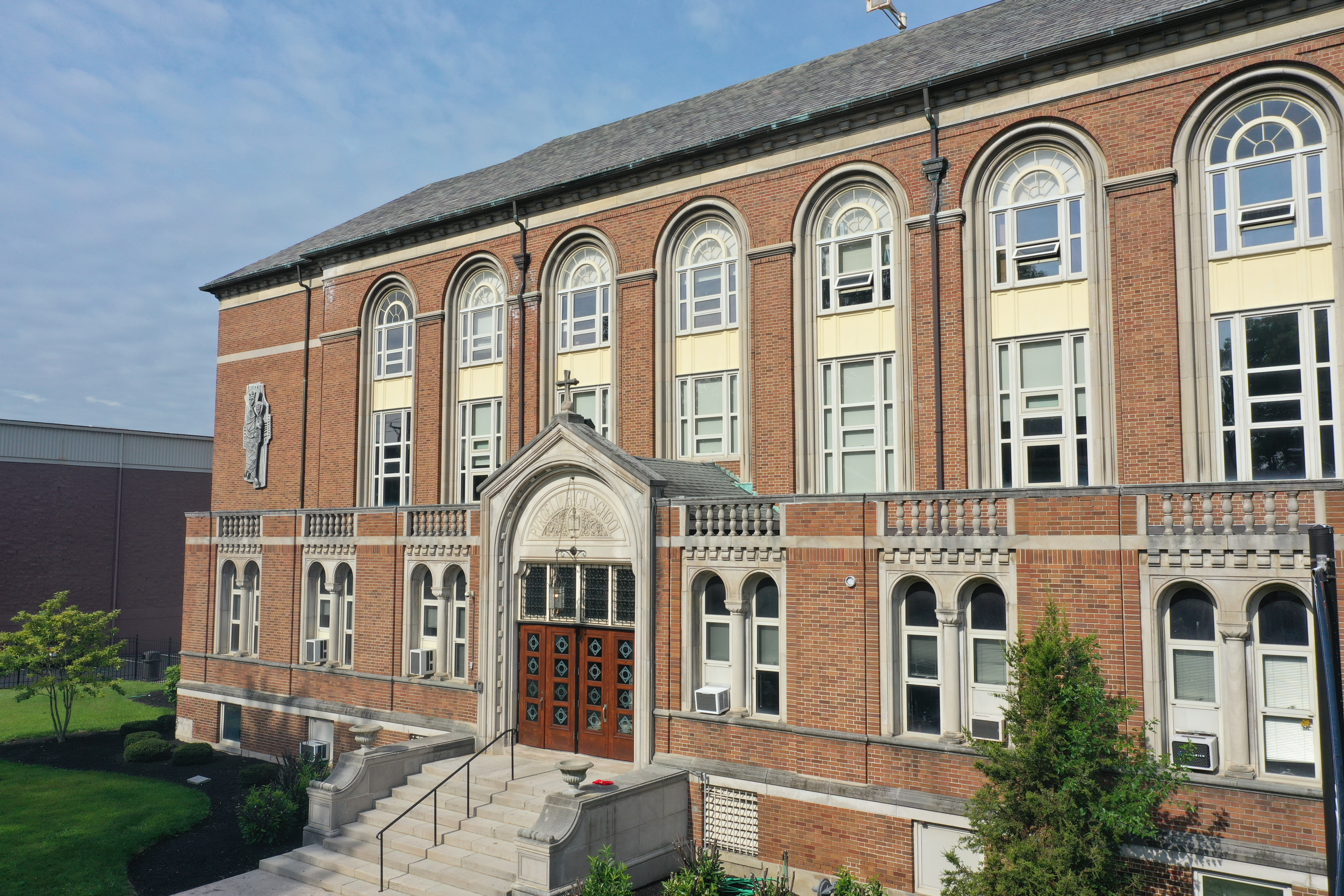

Location
- 2935 Hackberry Street; Cincinnati, (Hamilton County), Ohio 45206; United States; 39°7′51″N 84°28′31″W

Information
- Type: Parochial, college preparatory, Coeducational
- Motto: Praestans inter Omnes (Outstanding Among All)
- Religious affiliation: Roman Catholic
- Established: 1979
- School district: Roman Catholic Archdiocese of Cincinnati
- Authority: Society of Mary (Marianists)
- Principal: Ian Goddard (Interim)
- Faculty: 43 teachers
- Grades: 9–12
- Enrollment: 391 (2023–24)
- Average class size: 16
- Student to teacher ratio: 13:1
- Campus type: Urban
- Colors: Crimson, blue and gold
- Fight song: Onward Cavaliers
- Athletics conference: Miami Valley Conference
- Mascot: Cavalier
- Accreditation: North Central Association of Colleges and Schools
- Tuition: $10,500
- Website: www.purcellmarian.org

Purcell Marian High School is a Catholic parochial high school in the East Walnut Hills neighborhood of Cincinnati, Ohio, United States, based in the Marianist tradition. It is located in the DeSales Corner business district, along Madison Road.

Purcell Marian is a Roman Catholic, co-educational high school serving a multi-racial student body of many faiths with differing backgrounds and educational needs. It is chartered by the state of Ohio and accredited by North Central Association of Schools. Urban in its environment, it is supervised by the Archdiocese of Cincinnati. In October 2019, Purcell Marian was authorized as an International Baccalaureate World School.

== Purcell High School ==
Purcell High School began in 1928 as an Archdiocesan High School for young men. The site was originally purchased in 1924 by the Rt. Reverend Msgr. J. Henry Schengber for the parish of St. Francis de Sales. Under the direction of the Most Reverend Henry Moeller (Archbishop of Cincinnati) plans were drawn up for a high school which was to occupy the site of the present day Walnut Hills High School. In 1928, the Most Reverend John T. McNicholas decided to locate the school on Hackberry Street and gave it the name Purcell, in honor of the first Archbishop of the Archdiocese of Cincinnati, John Baptist Purcell. Purcell High School was under the administration of the Brothers of Mary and was staffed by Brothers, Marianist Priests, and lay men and women. The Eveslage Athletic Center was dedicated in 1971. In 2020, it was revealed that at least four Marian clergy who served at the school had been accused of committing acts of sex abuse.

== Marian High School ==
Marian High School began in 1908 as a co-educational parish school – the first school of its type in Cincinnati. It was named St. Marys and was located at St. Mary Parish in Hyde Park. For years the high school shared facilities with the elementary school in the building that had been erected in 1903 as St. Mary Mission Chapel. A new St. Mary High School was constructed in 1923. In 1928, St. Mary became a diocesan regional high school for girls only. The boys who had been enrolled there were transferred to the new Purcell High School. In 1963, a new high school called Marian High School was under the administration of the Sisters of Charity and was staffed by Sisters, Archdiocesan Priests, and lay men and women. The former Marian building now houses The Springer School.

== Merger to Form Purcell Marian ==
In 1980 the decision was made to merge both schools and the name changed to Purcell Marian High School. Purcell High School and Marian High School merged beginning with the 1981–82 school year. The mascot was chosen to be the Cavalier, and the school's colors would be Crimson, Blue and Gold.

The school seal shows the picture of the Blessed Virgin and Child. The inscription includes the school's motto, Praestans Inter Omnes, and the date of foundation.

== Academics ==
The curriculum is accredited by the Ohio Department of Education and the Ohio Catholic School Accrediting Association. Purcell Marian High School offers three academic pathways - the International Baccalaureate Program/Cavalier Scholars Program, College Prep, and General.

== Athletics ==
The Cavaliers athletic teams compete in the Miami Valley Conference, after joining the MVC for football only for the 2019 season Purcell Marian became a full MVC member effective with the 2021–22 school year. The move allowed Purcell Marian to play more Cincinnati-based high schools and significantly cut down on travel.

=== Staubach Stadium ===
In late 2020, Purcell Marian purchased two key properties that will allow the high school to expand its athletics facilities, and build a football stadium, Purcell Marian has been looking to bring this project to fruition since the late 1990s, but it couldn’t acquire all of the properties it needed. In April 2021 the school received a $1 million pledge from Harry and Linda Fath. On January 27, 2022 Purcell Marian announced its new planned athletic complex opening in fall 2023 will be named Staubach Stadium in honor of 1960 graduate Roger Staubach.

==== Ohio High School Athletic Association State Championships ====
- Boys Football – 1986
- Boys Baseball – 1953, 2003
- Boys Basketball - 1985
- Girls Basketball - 2022, 2023, 2024, 2025

== Clubs and activities ==
Purcell Marian offers 25+ extracurriculars, including athletics, academic clubs, and service groups. []

The school's Latin Club functions as a local chapter of both the Ohio Junior Classical League (OJCL) and National Junior Classical League (NJCL).

== Notable alumni, teachers, and coaches ==
- Jim Bolger, class of 1950, former Major League Baseball player
- Ron Beagle, class of 1951, All-American college football player
- Drew Denson, class of 1984, first baseman, first-round pick of 1984 Major League Baseball draft
- Derrek Dickey, class of 1969, professional basketball player for 1975 NBA champion Golden State Warriors
- Richard T. Farmer, class of 1952, self-made billionaire and founder of Cintas Corporation
- Richard Finan, class of 1950, politician, Ohio state representative
- Richard Hague, poet
- Kevin Harrington, class of 1975, investor ("shark") on the ABC show Shark Tank
- Bob Herbold, class of 1960, former chief operating officer of Microsoft Corporation
- Jack Hoffman, class of 1948, NFL player
- Maxwell Holt, class of 2005, member of United States men's national volleyball team and Italian club Modena Volley
- Jenny Kemp, class of 1973, Olympic Gold Medalist Swimmer
- Terry Killens, class of 1992, NFL linebacker 1996-2003, NFL Official (first person to play and officiate in a Super Bowl)
- Austin King, class of 1999, NFL lineman 2003-07, coach
- Robert Kistner, class of 1934, co-creator of birth control pill
- Ed Kluska, football coach at Purcell 1943-46, football coach at Xavier University 1947-54
- Charlie Luken, class of 1969, politician, former mayor of Cincinnati and Congressman
- Tom Luken, class of 1942, politician, former mayor of Cincinnati and Congressman
- John McTernan (actor), class of 1960, actor in Australia
- Bobby Moore, class of 1984, professional baseball player
- Scott Munninghoff, class of 1977, professional baseball player, first-round pick in 1977 Major League Baseball draft
- Michelle Mussman, class of 1990, politician, Illinois state representative
- Brian O'Neal, class of 1989, NFL fullback 1994-97
- Tyrone Power, class of 1931, actor, Hollywood film star of 1940s and '50s
- Leo Sack, class of 1932, played football and basketball at Xavier University 1933-36, played professional basketball for the Cincinnati Comellos in 1938
- Roger Staubach, class of 1960, Heisman Trophy winner at United States Naval Academy 1963, NFL quarterback for Dallas Cowboys 1969-79, member of Pro Football Hall of Fame, winner of Presidential Medal of Freedom in 2018
- Darren Watkins Jr., class of 2023, YouTuber and internet personality known as IShowSpeed
- Bob Wellman, class of 1943, former professional baseball player
- Russ Witherby, class of 1980, 1992 Ice Dance Champion, represented the United States in the 1992 Winter Olympics
- Mike Wright, class of 2000, former NFL lineman for New England Patriots
