= Jim Hilgemann =

American basketball player

Personal information
- Born: December 22, 1916 Wabash, Indiana, U.S.
- Died: August 28, 1967 (aged 50) Fort Wayne, Indiana, U.S.
- Listed height: 5 ft 11 in (1.80 m)
- Listed weight: 170 lb (77 kg)

Career information
- College: Toledo (1935–1937)
- Position: Guard

Career history
- 1937–1938: Fort Wayne General Electrics
- 1941: Fort Wayne Zollner Pistons

James A. Hilgemann (December 22, 1916 – August 28, 1967) was an American professional basketball player. He played in the National Basketball League for the Fort Wayne General Electrics in 1937–38 and the Fort Wayne Zollner Pistons at the start of the 1941–42 season. In 21 career games, he averaged 6.3 points per game. Hilgemann also served in World War II.

== Career statistics ==
Legend
| GP | Games played | FGM | Field goals made |
| FTM | Free throws made | FTA | Free throws attempted |
| FT% | Free throw percentage | PTS | Total points |
| PPG | Points per game | **Bold** | Career high |

=== NBL ===
==== Regular season ====
| Year | Team | GP | FGM | FTM | PTS | PPG |
|---|---|---|---|---|---|---|
| 1937–38 | Fort Wayne General Electrics | **17** | **50** | **30** | **130** | **7.6** |
| 1941–42 | Fort Wayne Zollner Pistons | 4 | 1 | 0 | 2 | .5 |
| Career | | 21 | 51 | 30 | 132 | 6.3 |
