= Woody Pitzer =

American basketball player

Personal information
- Born: November 3, 1910 Springfield, Ohio, U.S.
- Died: August 22, 2001 (aged 90) Springfield, Ohio, U.S.
- Listed height: 6 ft 0 in (1.83 m)
- Listed weight: 160 lb (73 kg)

Career information
- High school: Springfield (Springfield, Ohio)
- College: Wittenberg (1932–1935)
- Position: Shooting guard / small forward

Career history

Playing
- 1935–1936: Dayton Rays Clothiers
- 1936–1938: Columbus Athletic Supply

Coaching
- 1937–1950: Springfield HS

Elwood Gilbert "Woody" Pitzer (November 3, 1910 – August 22, 2001) was an American professional basketball and minor league baseball player. He played for the Columbus Athletic Supply in the National Basketball League and averaged 4.5 points per game. In college, he played both basketball and baseball for Wittenberg University.

In addition to basketball, Pitzer played minor league baseball for two years after college graduation. He competed for the Bartlesville Reds in 1935 and the Bartlesville Bucs in 1936, teams in the Cincinnati Reds farm system. In 127 career games, Pitzer batted .295 and hit one home run.
