= Sew Leeka =

American basketball player (1907–1985)

Personal information
- Born: September 15, 1907 Oklahoma, U.S.
- Died: October 11, 1985 (aged 78) Freeport, Texas, U.S.
- Listed height: 6 ft 1 in (1.85 m)
- Listed weight: 185 lb (84 kg)

Career information
- High school: William Chrisman (Independence, Missouri)
- College: Iowa (1926–1929)
- Position: Guard

Career history
- 1931–1932: Long Beach Elks
- 1932–1933: Olson's Terrible Swedes
- 1933–1934: Minneapolis Oilers
- 1935–1937: Olson's Terrible Swedes
- 1937–1938: Akron Firestone Non-Skids

Seward Clough Leeka (September 15, 1907 – October 11, 1985) was an American professional basketball player. He played for the Akron Firestone Non-Skids in the National Basketball League for nine games during the 1937–38 season and averaged 2.4 points per game. He later served in World War II and coached high school football in Freeport, Texas.
