= Tony Carp =

American basketball player

Personal information
- Born: May 2, 1911 Illinois
- Died: May 29, 1960 (aged 49) Chicago, Illinois
- Listed height: 6 ft 7 in (2.01 m)
- Listed weight: 215 lb (98 kg)
- Position: Forward

Career history
- 1933–1935: Chicago Lifschultz Fast Freights
- 1935–1936: Chicago Englewood
- 1936–1937: Whiting Ciesar All-Stars
- 1937–1938: Chicago
- 1938–1939: Chicago Cavaliers
- 1939: Chicago Bruins
- 1946–1947: Chicago Shamrocks

Anthony Jules Carp (May 2, 1911 – May 29, 1960) was an American professional basketball player. He played in the National Basketball League in one game for the Chicago Bruins during the 1939–40 season. He also competed in the Amateur Athletic Union, Midwest Basketball Conference, and independent leagues.
