= Norm Wagner =

American basketball player

Personal information
- Born: February 5, 1912 St. Louis, Missouri, U.S.
- Died: April 22, 1998 (aged 86) Columbia, Missouri, U.S.
- Listed height: 6 ft 5 in (1.96 m)
- Listed weight: 200 lb (91 kg)

Career information
- High school: Normandy (Wellston, Missouri)
- College: Missouri (1931–1934)
- Position: Center

Career history
- 1937: Dayton Metropolitans
- 1937: Columbus Athletic Supply
- 1937: Cincinnati Comellos

Norman Otto Wagner Jr. (February 5, 1912 – April 22, 1998) was an American professional basketball player. He played in the National Basketball League for three different teams during the 1937–38 season, including the Dayton Metropolitans, Columbus Athletic Supply, and Cincinnati Comellos. In eight career games he averaged 4.3 points per game.

== Career statistics ==
Legend
GP	Games played	FGM	Field goals made
FTM	Free throws made	FTA	Free throws attempted
FT%	Free throw percentage	PTS	Total points
PPG	Points per game	**Bold**	Career high

=== NBL ===
==== Regular season ====
Year	Team	GP	FGM	FTM	PTS	PPG
1937–38	Dayton	1	2	1	5	**5.0**
1937–38	Columbus	3	3	**3**	9	3.0
1937–38	Cincinnati	**4**	**9**	2	**20**	**5.0**
Career		8	14	6	34	4.3
