= Fort Wayne General Electrics =

- Nickname: The Electricians
- Leagues: Amateur Athletic Union; MBC 1936-1937; NBL 1937-1938; NIBL 1947-1948
- Founded: 1935
- Folded: 1948
- Arena: North Side High School Gym (3,000)
- Team colors: blue, white
- Ownership: General Electric

The Fort Wayne General Electrics was an amateur basketball team located in Fort Wayne, Indiana and competed in the National Basketball League and the National Industrial Basketball League. They joined the NBL (who later formed the NBA) in 1937 but they stayed there for 1 year, returning to their amateur status. In 1947 they were one of the founding members of the NIBL competing there for one season.

== History ==
The General Electrics franchise was set up as a corporate industrial team owned by the General Electric corporation. The goal of the team was to use the basketball games as a means of advertising for their products, and the goal of the players there was to have a steady day job while continuing their general basketball careers there.

In 1936, they joined the Midwest Basketball Conference (MBC) and they won their divisional playoff round 2–1 by forfeit. The Electrics were scheduled to host the Dayton London Bobbys for the deciding Game 3 of the Western Division Playoff round, but just hours before the game the Dayton franchise's team manager and head coach, Ray Lindemuth called the Electrics franchise's team manager and head coach Bill Hosket and told him the game would not be played, and when Hosket inquired as to why that was the case, Lindemuth hung up the phone. However, Fort Wayne would lose the Championship series two-games-to-none to another works team that joined that league this season in the Akron Goodyear Wingfoots. During their brief time in the National Basketball League, the successor league to the Midwest Basketball Conference, Scott Armstrong and Bart Quinn were the team's top players. Despite their short tenure in the NBL, they're often credited as one of the three biggest, business-owned franchises to help create the NBL (sometimes to the point of ignoring Frank Kautsky's local grocery store business owned team in the Indianapolis Kautskys as another key figure involved in its creation), with the NBL eventually merging operations with the Basketball Association of America to become the present-day National Basketball Association.

After playing in NBL for one year, having a record of 13 wins and 7 losses, they eventually joined the National Industrial Basketball League in 1947, though they finished dead last in the league without a single win. Following their only season in the NIBL, they would end up folding operations as a team franchise for good, with General Electric eventually leaving the city of Fort Wayne, Indiana entirely.

== Team record ==
Note: W = wins, L = losses, % = win–loss %

Season	W	L	%	Playoffs	Results
Fort Wayne General Electrics
1936–37 (MBC)	6	6	.500	2nd	Lost MBC championship to the Akron Goodyear Wingfoots
1937–38 (NBL)	13	7	.650	3rd	Did not qualify for NBL playoffs
1947–48 (NIBL)	0	8	.000	5th	Dead last place finish; folded operations

== Notable players ==
- Scott Armstrong
- Bart Quinn
- James Hilgemann
- Preston Slack
- Bud Lindberg
- Claude Holmes
- Byron Evard
