= Glenford, Ohio =

- Village
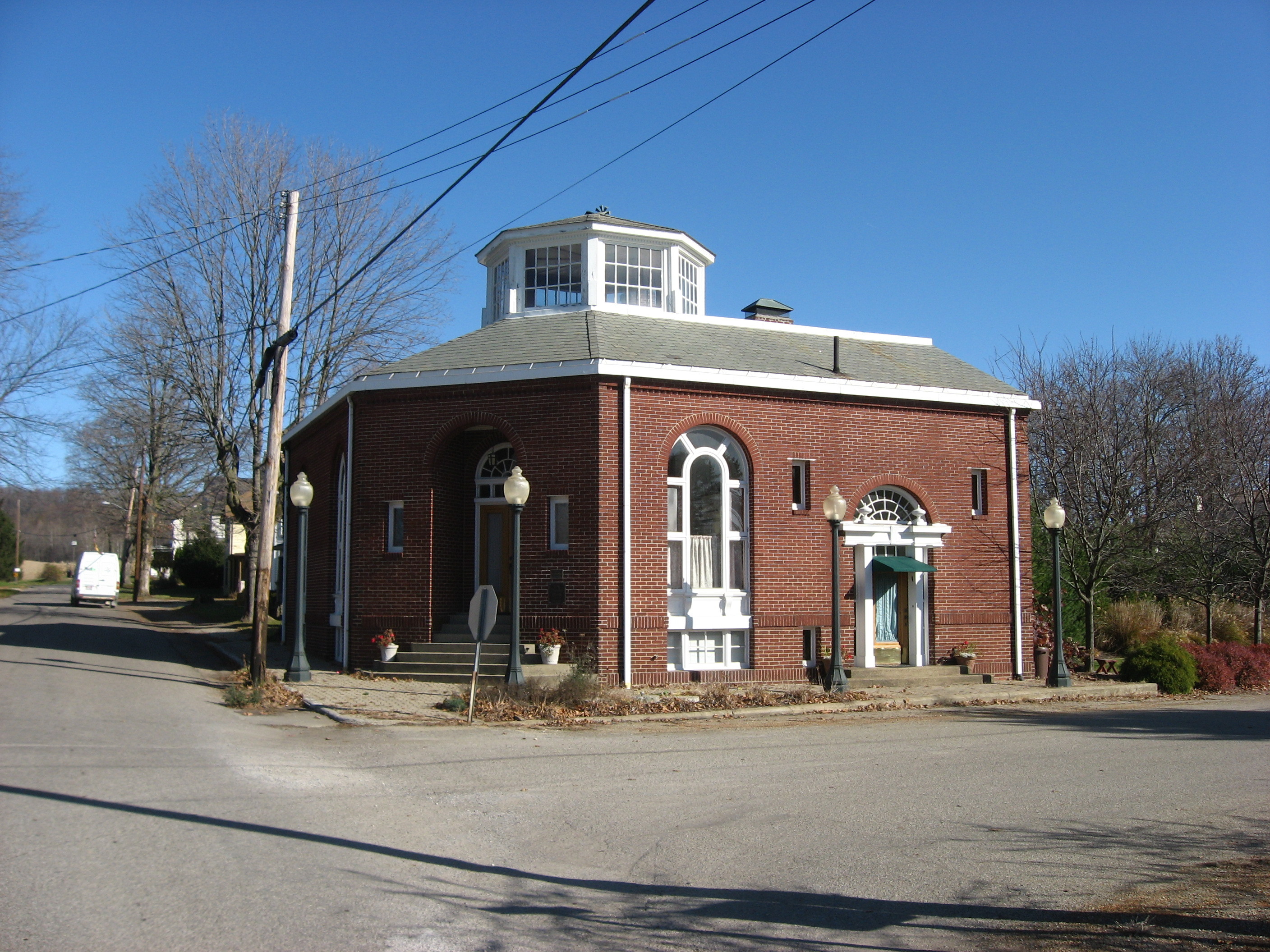
- The former Glenford Bank, downtown

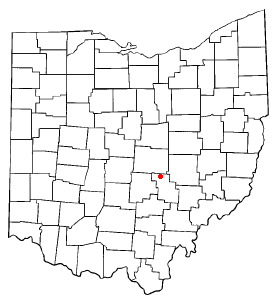
- Location of Glenford, Ohio

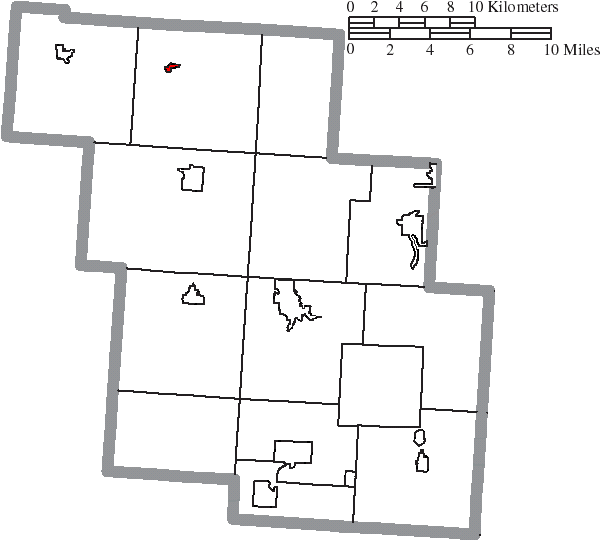
- Location of Glenford in Perry County
- Coordinates: 39°53′12″N 82°19′11″W
- Country: United States
- State: Ohio
- County: Perry

Area
  - Total: 0.12 sq mi (0.30 km^{2})
  - Land: 0.11 sq mi (0.29 km^{2})
  - Water: 0.0039 sq mi (0.01 km^{2})
- Elevation: 840 ft (260 m)

Population (2020)
  - Total: 165
  - Estimate (2023): 164
  - Density: 1,463/sq mi (564.9/km^{2})
- Time zone: UTC-5 (Eastern (EST))
  - Summer (DST): UTC-4 (EDT)
- ZIP code: 43739
- Area code: 740
- FIPS code: 39-30436
- GNIS feature ID: 2398975

Glenford is a village in Perry County, Ohio, United States. The population was 165 at the 2020 census.

== History ==
Glenford had its start when the railroad was extended to that point. A post office called Glenford has been in operation since 1871.

== Geography ==
According to the United States Census Bureau, the village has a total area of 0.11 square miles (0.28 km^{2}), all land.

== Demographics ==
Historical population
Census	Pop.	Note	%±
1930	180		—
1940	231		28.3%
1950	180		−22.1%
1960	190		5.6%
1970	177		−6.8%
1980	173		−2.3%
1990	208		20.2%
2000	198		−4.8%
2010	173		−12.6%
2020	165		−4.6%
2023 (est.)	164	▼	−0.6%
U.S. Decennial Census

=== 2010 census ===
As of the census of 2010, there were 173 people, 61 households, and 47 families living in the village. The population density was 1,572.7 inhabitants per square mile (607.2/km^{2}). There were 64 housing units at an average density of 581.8 per square mile (224.6/km^{2}). The racial makeup of the village was 98.3% White, 0.6% African American, 0.6% Asian, and 0.6% from two or more races.

There were 61 households, of which 44.3% had children under the age of 18 living with them, 52.5% were married couples living together, 18.0% had a female householder with no husband present, 6.6% had a male householder with no wife present, and 23.0% were non-families. 16.4% of all households were made up of individuals, and 6.6% had someone living alone who was 65 years of age or older. The average household size was 2.84 and the average family size was 3.09.

The median age in the village was 32.1 years. 30.1% of residents were under the age of 18; 9.1% were between the ages of 18 and 24; 27.8% were from 25 to 44; 26.1% were from 45 to 64; and 6.9% were 65 years of age or older. The gender makeup of the village was 50.9% male and 49.1% female.

=== 2000 census ===
As of the census of 2000, there were 198 people, 69 households, and 54 families living in the village. The population density was 1,519.0 inhabitants per square mile (586.5/km^{2}). There were 70 housing units at an average density of 537.0 per square mile (207.3/km^{2}). The racial makeup of the village was 96.97% White, 1.01% African American, 0.51% Native American, 1.01% Pacific Islander, and 0.51% from two or more races. Hispanic or Latino of any race were 1.52% of the population.

There were 69 households, out of which 36.2% had children under the age of 18 living with them, 63.8% were married couples living together, 7.2% had a female householder with no husband present, and 21.7% were non-families. 15.9% of all households were made up of individuals, and 7.2% had someone living alone who was 65 years of age or older. The average household size was 2.87 and the average family size was 3.20.

In the village, the population was spread out, with 28.3% under the age of 18, 12.6% from 18 to 24, 21.7% from 25 to 44, 25.3% from 45 to 64, and 12.1% who were 65 years of age or older. The median age was 35 years. For every 100 females there were 100.0 males. For every 100 females age 18 and over, there were 97.2 males.

The median income for a household in the village was $38,750, and the median income for a family was $40,625. Males had a median income of $27,083 versus $28,438 for females. The per capita income for the village was $16,084. None of the families and 1.6% of the population were living below the poverty line.

== Education ==
Glenford is served by the Northern Local School District, which operates Glenford Elementary School in the village.

== Notable person ==
- Larry Householder, Ohio House of Representative (1997–2004, 2017–2021) and Ohio House Speaker (2001-2004, 2019–2020)
