= Joe Stack =

American basketball player

Personal information
- Born: November 5, 1912 Whiting, Indiana, U.S.
- Died: October 13, 1954 (aged 41)
- Listed height: 5 ft 10 in (1.78 m)
- Listed weight: 185 lb (84 kg)

Career information
- High school: Hammond Tech (Hammond, Indiana)
- Playing career: 1933–1939
- Position: Small forward / shooting guard

Career history
- 1933–1934: Whiting Macks
- 1934–1936: Hammond Hoy Trinity Five
- 1936–1938: Whiting Ciesar All-Americans
- 1938–1939: Hammond Ciesar All-Americans
- 1938–1939: Whiting Service

Joseph W. Stack (November 5, 1912 – October 13, 1954) was an American professional basketball player. He played in the National Basketball League for Whiting/Hammond Ciesar All-Americans and averaged 4.6 points per game.
