= Max Padlow =

American football player (1912–1971)

Max Padlow (August 15, 1912 – August 8, 1971) was a professional American football end for the Philadelphia Eagles (1935–1936) in the National Football League and the Cleveland Rams (1936) and the Cincinnati Bengals (1937) of the second American Football League. He played college football for Ohio State University. He was Jewish.
