= Ife Holmes =

American basketball player

Personal information
- Born: August 15, 1905 Warren, Indiana, U.S.
- Died: January 27, 1985 (aged 79)
- Listed height: 5 ft 6 in (1.68 m)
- Listed weight: 150 lb (68 kg)

Career information
- College: DePauw
- Position: Guard

Career history
- 1929–1938: Fort Wayne General Electrics

Claude "Ife" Holmes (August 15, 1905 – January 27, 1985) was an American professional basketball player. He played in the National Basketball League for the Fort Wayne General Electrics from 1929 to 1938.
