= Willie Adams (basketball) =

American basketball player (1911–1992)

Personal information
- Born: October 2, 1911 Fort Wayne, Indiana, U.S.
- Died: September 30, 1992 (aged 80) Fort Wayne, Indiana, U.S.
- Listed height: 5 ft 11 in (1.80 m)
- Listed weight: 160 lb (73 kg)

Career information
- High school: Emmaus Lutheran (Indianapolis, Indiana)
- Position: Forward

Career history
- 1936–1938: Fort Wayne General Electrics

Wilmer Fred Adams (October 2, 1911 – September 30, 1992) was an American professional basketball player. He played in the National Basketball League for the Fort Wayne General Electrics during the 1937–38 season. Adams averaged 3.6 points per game.
