= Clovis Stark =

American basketball player

Personal information
- Born: October 6, 1914
- Died: April 25, 2001 (aged 86) Dayton, Ohio
- Listed height: 6 ft 4 in (1.93 m)
- Listed weight: 175 lb (79 kg)

Career information
- High school: North (Columbus, Ohio)
- College: Ohio Wesleyan (1933–1936)
- Position: Forward

Career history
- 1937–1938: Dayton Metropolitans

Career highlights
- 2× All-Buckeye (1935, 1936)

Clovis Ewing Stark (October 6, 1914 – April 25, 2001) was an American professional basketball player. He played in the National Basketball League for the Dayton Metropolitans in nine games during the 1937–38 season and averaged 4.2 points per game.
