= Bob Shaddock =

American basketball player (1920–1991)

Personal information
- Born: November 15, 1920 Corning, New York, U.S.
- Died: April 22, 1991 (aged 70) Corning, New York, U.S.
- Listed height: 6 ft 1 in (1.85 m)
- Listed weight: 160 lb (73 kg)

Career information
- High school: Corning Free Academy (Corning, New York)
- College: Syracuse (1940–1943)
- Position: Guard

Career history
- 1945–1946: Sacramento Senators
- 1946: Syracuse Nationals
- 1946–1947: Utica Olympics
- 1946–1947: Cohoes Mastodons
- 1946–1947: Gloversville Glovers

Robert William Shaddock (November 15, 1920 – April 22, 1991) was an American professional basketball player. He appeared in two games for the Syracuse Nationals in the National Basketball League during the 1946–47 season. Shaddock spent the remainder of his career playing for various teams in the New York State Professional Basketball League.
