= Leo Sack =

American basketball player (1914–1987)

Personal information
- Born: May 18, 1914 Ohio, U.S.
- Died: January 2, 1987 (aged 72) Cincinnati, Ohio, U.S.
- Listed height: 5 ft 8 in (1.73 m)
- Listed weight: 145 lb (66 kg)

Career information
- High school: Purcell (Cincinnati, Ohio)
- College: Xavier (1933–1936)
- Position: Guard

Career history
- 1936–1937: Dayton Metropolitans
- 1937–1938: Richmond King Clothiers
- 1938: Cincinnati Comellos

Leo Paul Sack (May 18, 1914 – January 2, 1987) was an American professional basketball player. He played in the National Basketball League in six games for the Cincinnati Comellos during the 1937–38 season and averaged 7.2 points per game. He played college football and basketball at Xavier University.
