= Bart Quinn =

American basketball player

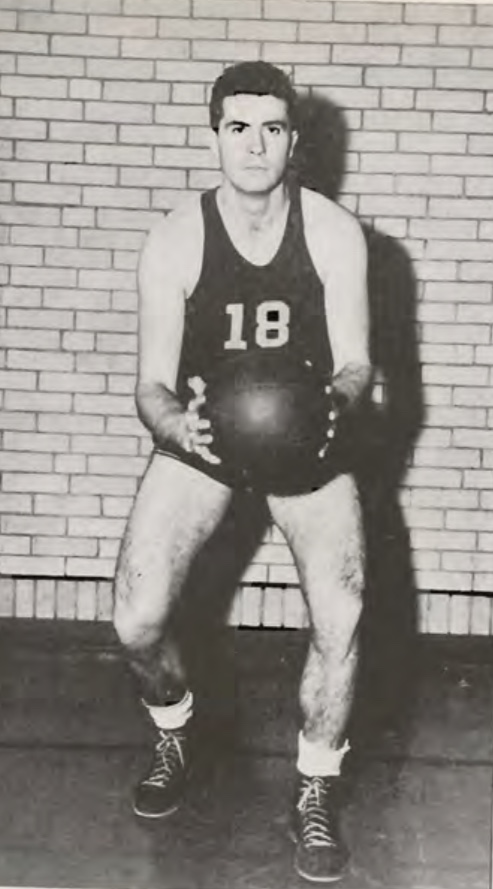
- Quinn from the 1942 Blockhouse

Personal information
- Born: February 19, 1917 Fort Wayne, Indiana, U.S.
- Died: March 3, 2013 (aged 96) Los Alamitos, California, U.S.
- Listed height: 6 ft 2 in (1.88 m)
- Listed weight: 200 lb (91 kg)

Career information
- High school: Central Catholic (Fort Wayne, Indiana)
- College: Toledo (1939–1942)
- Position: Forward

Career history
- 1937–1938: Fort Wayne General Electrics

Career highlights
- All-NBL Second Team (1938); First-team All-American – MSG (1942)

Bartus A. Quinn (February 19, 1917 – March 3, 2013) was an American basketball player. He was an All-American college player at the University of Toledo and played one season in the National Basketball League (NBL) of the United States, one of the major American leagues that later became the National Basketball Association.

Quinn, a 6'2", 200-pound forward from Fort Wayne, Indiana, went on to play for his hometown Fort Wayne General Electrics of the NBL directly out of high school. In the 1937–38 season, he averaged 9.4 points per game and was named to the All-NBL Second Team.

After his season in the NBL, Quinn went to Toledo to play college basketball. He was a three-year starter for the Rockets, finishing his career with 702 points. As a senior in 1941–42, Quinn led the Rockets to the 1942 National Invitation Tournament. He was named All-Ohio and a first-team All-American by Madison Square Garden. Following his college career, he served in the United States Navy during World War II.

Quinn died on March 3, 2013, at the age of 96.

== Career statistics ==
Legend
GP	Games played	FGM	Field goals made
FTM	Free throws made	FTA	Free throws attempted
FT%	Free throw percentage	PTS	Total points
PPG	Points per game	**Bold**	Career high

=== NBL ===
==== Regular season ====
Year	Team	GP	FGM	FTM	PTS	PPG
1937–38	F.W. General Electrics	18	71	28	170	9.4
