= Marvin Stout =

American basketball player

Personal information
- Born: August 6, 1915 Winamac, Indiana, U.S.
- Died: December 12, 1991 (aged 76) Visalia, California, U.S.
- Listed height: 5 ft 11 in (1.80 m)
- Listed weight: 155 lb (70 kg)

Career information
- High school: Winamac (Winamac, Indiana)
- College: Ball State (1935–1938)
- Playing career: 1936–1942
- Position: Guard

Career history
- 1936–1937, 1939: Indianapolis Kautskys
- 1938–1939: Indianapolis Hilgemeier Packers
- 1940–1942: Indiana Collegiates

Marvin A. Stout (August 6, 1915 – December 12, 1991) was an American professional basketball player. He appeared in one game for the Indianapolis Kautskys while the team played in the National Basketball League (1939–40 season) and scored two points.
