= Bill Reeves (basketball) =

American basketball player (1904–1983)

Personal information
- Born: December 5, 1904 Indiana, U.S.
- Died: December 6, 1983 (aged 79) West Point, Indiana, U.S.
- Listed height: 5 ft 10 in (1.78 m)
- Listed weight: 165 lb (75 kg)

Career information
- High school: West Point (West Point, Indiana)
- College: Canterbury (1928–1932)
- Position: Guard

Career history
- 1932–1938: Akron Firestone Non-Skids
- 1938–1939: Columbus Hilltop Merchants

William Orville Reeves (December 5, 1904 – December 6, 1983) was an American professional basketball player. He played for the Akron Firestone Non-Skids in the National Basketball League. He played college basketball at Canterbury College (then called Central Normal College) for four years. Reeves was inducted into the Indiana Basketball Hall of Fame.

== Career statistics ==
Legend
| GP | Games played | FGM | Field goals made |
| FTM | Free throws made | FTA | Free throws attempted |
| FT% | Free throw percentage | PTS | Total points |
| PPG | Points per game | **Bold** | Career high |

=== NBL ===
==== Regular season ====
| Year | Team | GP | FGM | FTM | PTS | PPG |
|---|---|---|---|---|---|---|
| 1937–38 | Akron Firestone Non-Skids | 8 | 5 | 4 | 14 | 1.8 |

==== Playoffs ====
| Year | Team | GP | FGM | FTM | PTS | PPG |
|---|---|---|---|---|---|---|
| 1937–38 | Akron Firestone Non-Skids | 1 | 0 | 0 | 0 | .0 |
