= Bud Moodler =

American basketball player

Personal information
- Born: September 21, 1912 Montgomery, Ohio, U.S.
- Died: August 7, 1977 (aged 64) Craig, Colorado, U.S.
- Listed height: 6 ft 3 in (1.91 m)
- Listed weight: 215 lb (98 kg)

Career information
- High school: Fairview (Fairview Park, Ohio)
- College: Defiance (1931–1932)
- Position: Guard

Career history
- 1937–1938: Dayton Metropolitans
- 1939–1940: Detroit Eagles

Marion Eugene "Bud" Moodler (September 21, 1912 – August 7, 1977) was an American professional basketball player. He played in the National Basketball League for the Dayton Metropolitans during the 1937–38 season and the Detroit Eagles during the 1939–40 season; for his career he averaged 2.1 points per game. In his post-basketball life, McMahon worked as a toolmaker for 32 years.
