= Scott Armstrong (basketball) =

American basketball player

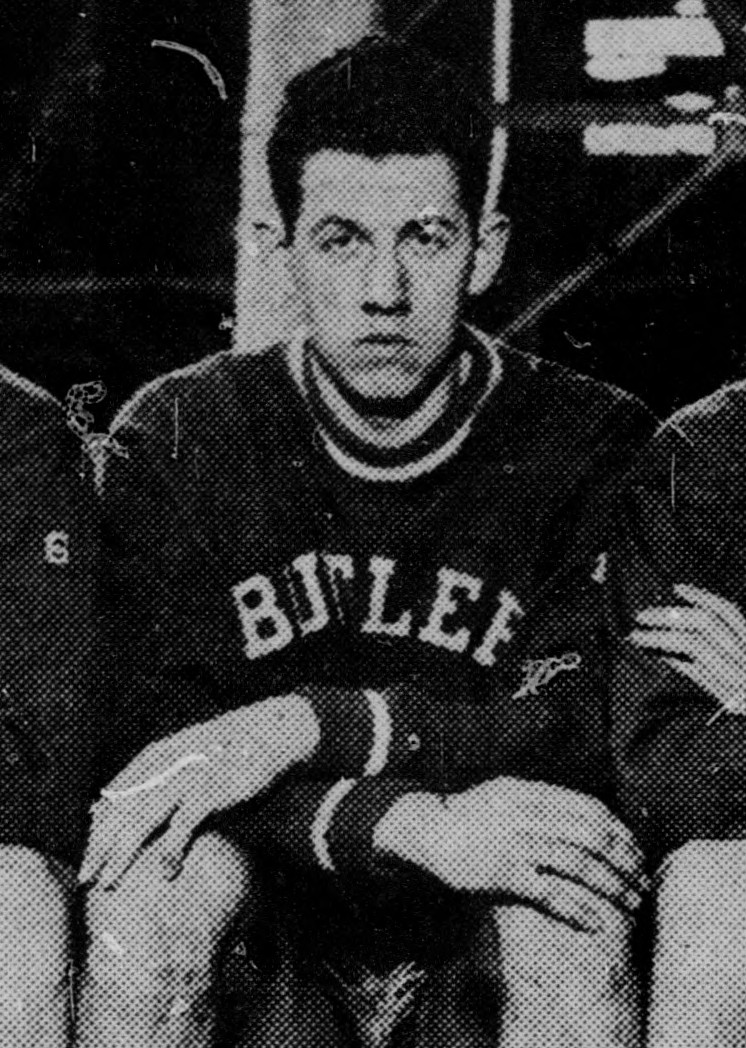
- Armstrong, circa 1936

Personal information
- Born: October 12, 1913 Fort Wayne, Indiana, U.S.
- Died: August 20, 1997 (aged 83) Fort Wayne, Indiana, U.S.
- Listed height: 6 ft 4 in (1.93 m)
- Listed weight: 190 lb (86 kg)

Career information
- High school: Fort Wayne (Fort Wayne, Indiana)
- College: Butler (1933–1936)
- Playing career: 1937–1942
- Position: Forward / center

Career history

Playing
- 1937–1938: Fort Wayne General Electrics
- 1938–1939: Oshkosh All-Stars
- 1939–1940, 1941–1942: Indianapolis Kautskys

Coaching
- 1939–1942: Butler (assistant)

Career highlights
- All-NBL First Team (1938)

Scott Thomas Armstrong Jr. (October 12, 1913 – August 20, 1997) was an American professional basketball player. He played in the National Basketball League for the Fort Wayne General Electrics, Oshkosh All-Stars, and Indianapolis Kautskys. Armstrong was an NBL all-star during his lone season on Oshkosh (1938–39). While living in Indianapolis, Indiana and playing for the Kautskys, he also served as an assistant coach for Butler University's men's basketball team, his alma mater where he had previously played. Armstrong's post-basketball life included serving in the United States Navy and becoming a principal of a junior high school.
