= Warren Whitlinger =

American basketball player and tennis coach

Personal information
- Born: April 4, 1914 Barnesville, Ohio, U.S.
- Died: April 30, 2012 (aged 98) Neenah, Wisconsin, U.S.
- Listed height: 5 ft 9 in (1.75 m)
- Listed weight: 170 lb (77 kg)

Career information
- High school: Zanesville (Zanesville, Ohio)
- College: Ohio State (1933–1936)
- Playing career: 1936–1939
- Position: Forward

Career history
- 1936–1937: Columbus Athletic Supplies
- 1936–1937: Zanesville Greys
- 1937–1938: Akron Firestone Non-Skids
- 1938–1939: Columbus Hilltop Merchants

Career highlights
- All-Big Ten (1936)

Warren Wayne Whitlinger (April 4, 1914 – April 30, 2012) was an American professional basketball player. He played in the National Basketball League for the Akron Firestone Non-Skids during the 1937–38 season and averaged 4.5 points per game. As a senior at Ohio State in 1935–36, Whitlinger led the Big Ten Conference in scoring and was named to the All-Big Ten team. He also earned his Master of Business Administration (MBA) from Ohio State, graduating in 1940, and then accepted a job to work for Kimberly-Clark Corporation.

== Family and tennis connections ==
In the early 1960s Whitlinger became involved with tennis. It became his new passion and he got into coaching, where he ended up training three different national champions within his own family – his son John and his twin granddaughters Tami and Teri. All three went on to have professional tennis careers, and John served as Stanford's men's tennis head coach from 2005 to 2014.

The Whitlingers were recognized as the Wisconsin and Midwest Tennis Family of the Year in 1986 and the USTA National Tennis Family of the Year in 1987. Warren was inducted into the Fox Valley Tennis Association Hall of Fame in 1999.
