= Byron Evard =

American basketball player (1908–1983)

Personal information
- Born: March 27, 1908 Fort Wayne, Indiana
- Died: December 22, 1983 (aged 75) Naples, Florida
- Listed height: 5 ft 8 in (1.73 m)
- Listed weight: 155 lb (70 kg)

Career information
- College: St. Viator (1926–1930)
- Playing career: 1937–1938
- Position: Guard

Career history
- 1937–1938: Fort Wayne General Electrics

Byron Alfred Evard (March 27, 1908 – December 22, 1983) was an American professional basketball player. He played in the National Basketball League for the Fort Wayne General Electrics. In 10 games, he averaged 1.6 points per game. Prior to his NBL career, Evard attended St. Viator College where he played football, basketball, and baseball.
