= Pres Slack =

American basketball player (1908–1993)

Personal information
- Born: December 28, 1908 Wisconsin, U.S.
- Died: January 25, 1993 (aged 84) Orange, California, U.S.
- Listed height: 6 ft 2 in (1.88 m)
- Listed weight: 180 lb (82 kg)

Career information
- High school: Central (Fort Wayne, Indiana)
- Position: Power forward / center

Career history
- 1937–1938: Fort Wayne General Electrics
- 1938–1939: Sheboygan Red Skins

Preston Webb Slack (December 28, 1908 – January 25, 1993) was an American professional basketball player. He played in the National Basketball League for the Fort Wayne General Electrics in 1937–38 and the Sheboygan Red Skins in 1938–39. In his 23-game NBL career, Slack averaged 4.3 points per game.
