= Jack Shaffer =

American basketball player

Personal information
- Born: August 13, 1909 Grand Island, Nebraska, U.S.
- Died: June 17, 1963 (aged 53) Akron, Ohio, U.S.
- Listed height: 6 ft 3 in (1.91 m)
- Listed weight: 190 lb (86 kg)

Career information
- College: Doane; DePaul
- Playing career: 1934–1941
- Position: Forward / center

Career history
- 1934–1935: Olsen's Terrible Swedes
- 1935–1936: Akron Firestones
- 1936–1938: Akron Firestone Non-Skids
- 1940–1941: Fort Wayne

John Cleo Shaffer (August 13, 1909 – June 17, 1963) was an American professional basketball player. He appeared in six games for the Akron Firestone Non-Skids in the National Basketball League during the 1937–38 season. A son of Russian immigrants, he grew up in Grand Island, Nebraska and attended the Grand Island campus of Doane University before enrolling at DePaul University. He died of a heart attack in 1963.
