= Bill Hosket Sr. =

American basketball player and coach (1911–1956)

Bill Hosket
Personal information
- Born: February 19, 1911 Dayton, Ohio
- Died: December 29, 1956 (aged 45) Dayton, Ohio
- Listed height: 6 ft 5 in (1.96 m)

Career information
- High school: Stivers (Dayton, Ohio)
- College: Ohio State (1930–1934)
- Playing career: 1935–1942
- Position: Center

Career history

Playing
- 1935–1936: Dayton Metropolitans
- 1936–1937: Columbus Athletic Supply
- 1937–1938: Dayton Metropolitans
- 1939–1940: Waterloo Wonders
- 1940–1941: Dayton Sucher Meat Packing
- 1941–1942: Columbus

Coaching
- 1935–1936: Dayton Metropolitans

Career highlights
- First-team All-Big Ten (1933)

Wilmer Clemons Hosket Sr. (February 19, 1911 – December 19, 1956) was an American basketball player and coach.

A 6'5" center, Hosket starred at Stivers High School in Dayton, Ohio, whom he led to three state championships from 1928 to 1930, and was named to the All-tournament team each time. He was an inaugural inductee of the school's Hall of Fame.

He then played at the Ohio State University, where he won a Big Ten Conference championship in 1933. He was named All-Big Ten center for the season. After college, Hosket played for a short time in the National Basketball League as a member of the Dayton Metropolitans.

== Personal life ==
Hosket was married to Ethel, with whom he had three children, Diana Sue, Beverly Ann, and Bill Jr. Bill Jr. would also become a basketball player, following in his father's footsteps at Ohio State, before playing in the NBA for the New York Knicks and Buffalo Braves. Both Hoskets have been inducted into the Ohio State University Hall of Fame and the Ohio Basketball Hall of Fame. After his basketball career, Hosket Sr. worked for General Motors, and was as a basketball and football referee in the Dayton area. Hosket died of leukemia in 1956.

== Career statistics ==
Legend
GP	Games played	FGM	Field goals made
FTM	Free throws made	FTA	Free throws attempted
FT%	Free throw percentage	PTS	Total points
PPG	Points per game	**Bold**	Career high

=== NBL ===
==== Regular season ====
Year	Team	GP	FGM	FTM	PTS	PPG
1937–38	Dayton	10	11	12	34	3.4
