= 1938–39 Pittsburgh Pirates season =

NBL professional basketball team season

- Head coach: Dudey Moore (player-coach)
- Owner: Meyer "Buck" Gefsky
- Arena: Duquesne U Gym

Results
- Record: 13–14 (.481)
- Place: Division: 4th (Eastern)
- Playoff finish: Did not qualify

The 1938–39 Pittsburgh Pirates season was the second (and technically final) professional basketball season of play for the Pittsburgh Pirates NBL team in the city of Pittsburgh, Pennsylvania under the National Basketball League, which officially was the second season that it existed as a professional basketball league after previously existing as a semi-pro or amateur basketball league called the Midwest Basketball Conference in its first two seasons back in 1935. However, if one were to include their start as the Pittsburgh Y.M.H.A. team back in 1931 back when they were an amateur team from the Pittsburgh Young Men's Hebrew Association before they joined the Midwest Basketball Conference for the two seasons they played in that league before they both got rebranded into the respective names used here, this would officially be their seventh (and technically final) season of play as a franchise. Not only that, but they would also technically be one of three surviving teams from the two previous MBC seasons of play (alongside the Akron Firestone Non-Skids and Indianapolis Kautskys) to continue playing in the NBL in its second season of existence. The Pittsburgh Pirates NBL team would be one of eight teams representing the NBL this season, with four teams being showcased in the Eastern Division (which would be Pittsburgh's division) and four teams being in the Western Division, including the late new entry into the NBL in the Sheboygan Red Skins.

Unlike their previous season of play where the Pirates were one of six winning teams playing in the NBL, this season would have them taking a step backwards in terms of production and profits, with the more streamlined level of production and more consistent scheduling against other NBL teams leading to Pittsburgh finishing their second and final season in the NBL (under the Pirates name, anyway) with a last place finish in their division with a 13–14 record, barely being behind the tied placements of the defending champion Akron Goodyear Wingfoots and the Warren Penns recently turned Cleveland White Horses for second place and well behind the eventual new NBL champion Akron Firestone Non-Skids establishing their first place dominance upon the rest of the league this season. However, even if the Pirates did establish a tie of sorts, if not overshadow both second place teams in their division, they still wouldn't have qualified for the 1939 NBL Playoffs (which really was just a best of five championship series match-up between the Akron Firestone Non-Skids and the Oshkosh All-Stars this time around) due to the unexplained decision of replacing the playoff format they had the previous season with just a best of five winner takes all championship series between the two best teams of the NBL this season. Regardless of reasons at hand, the Pittsburgh Pirates NBL squad would end up being the only NBL team to end up leaving the league by the end of the season due to financial issues, which later led to them being replaced by the original American Basketball League's Chicago Bruins as the newest eighth team in the NBL for the upcoming season. However, near the end of World War II, a new Pittsburgh team that's slated to be a rebranding of the original Pittsburgh Pirates NBL team would end up joining the NBL in order to help revive the number of teams lost in later seasons due to that war, with the Pirates being replaced by the Pittsburgh Raiders for the 1944–45 NBL season (though it would turn out to only last for that particular season of play for the new Pittsburgh NBL squad).

Despite ending the season with a worse record than their inaugural season, the Pittsburgh Pirates would still have a player making it to the All-NBL First Team with Paul Birch having that honor for Pittsburgh this season.

== Roster ==
Please note that due to the way records for professional basketball leagues like the NBL and the ABL were recorded at the time, some information on both teams and players may be harder to list out than usual here.

1938–39 Pittsburgh Pirates roster
Players

Pos.	No.	Player	Height	Weight	DOB	From
G		Paul Birch	6 ft 1 in (1.85 m)	190 lb (86 kg)	1910–01–10	Duquesne
G/F		Herb Bonn	6 ft 0 in (1.83 m)	195 lb (88 kg)	1916–01–14	Duquesne
G/F		Joe Fabel	6 ft 1 in (1.85 m)	190 lb (86 kg)	1917–05–15	Pittsburgh
C		Ernie Fortney	6 ft 4 in (1.93 m)	220 lb (100 kg)	1915–01–06	Duquesne
G		Hymie Ginsburg	5 ft 9 in (1.75 m)	170 lb (77 kg)	1914–03–23	Geneva
G		Bill Jesko	5 ft 10 in (1.78 m)	170 lb (77 kg)	1915–12–24	Pittsburgh
C		Joe Kinney	6 ft 6 in (1.98 m)	220 lb (100 kg)	1910–03–12	West Virginia Wesleyan
C		Ed Kweller	6 ft 6 in (1.98 m)	225 lb (102 kg)	1915–01–27	Duquesne
G		Red Malackany	5 ft 9 in (1.75 m)	165 lb (75 kg)	1913–05–03	Duquesne
F		Walt Miller	6 ft 2 in (1.88 m)	190 lb (86 kg)	1915–07–30	Duquesne
G		Dudey Moore	5 ft 9 in (1.75 m)	180 lb (82 kg)	1910–04–05	Duquesne
G/F		Squint Phares	5 ft 10 in (1.78 m)	175 lb (79 kg)	1915–12–31	West Virginia
G		Marty Reiter	5 ft 7 in (1.70 m)	160 lb (73 kg)	1911–08–25	Duquesne
G/F		Gene Rosenthal	5 ft 11 in (1.80 m)	175 lb (79 kg)	1914–08–05	Carnegie Mellon
F/C		Edward Spotovich	6 ft 2 in (1.88 m)	190 lb (86 kg)	1916–05–06	Pittsburgh
C		Jack Stirling	6 ft 5 in (1.96 m)	195 lb (88 kg)	1917–11–16	Geneva
F/C		Chub Watson	6 ft 2 in (1.88 m)	200 lb (91 kg)	1917–06–07	Marshall

Coaches
Head coach
- Bobby McDermott

Legend
- (DP) Unsigned draft pick
- (FA) Free agent
- (S) Suspended
- Injured

Roster

== Regular season ==
=== Season standings ===
Pos.	Eastern Division	Wins	Losses	Win %
1	Akron Firestone Non-Skids	24	3	.889
T–2	Akron Goodyear Wingfoots	14	14	.500
T–2	Warren Penns / Cleveland White Horses^{‡}	14	14	.500
4	Pittsburgh Pirates	13	14	.481
^{‡} Warren relocated to Cleveland during the season and assumed Warren's record in the standings. Warren's record was 9–10 and Cleveland's record was 5–4.

=== NBL Schedule ===
- November 23, 1938 @ Pittsburgh, PA: Hammond Ciesar All-Americans 30, Pittsburgh Pirates 40
- November 26, 1938 @ Oshkosh, WI: Pittsburgh Pirates 33, Oshkosh All-Stars 55
- November 27, 1938 @ Sheboygan, WI: Pittsburgh Pirates 28, Sheboygan Red Skins 45
- November 30, 1938 @ Pittsburgh, PA: Akron Goodyear Wingfoots 37, Pittsburgh Pirates 34
- December 14, 1938 @ Pittsburgh, PA: Akron Firestone Non-Skids 43, Pittsburgh Pirates 28
- December 21, 1938 @ Pittsburgh, PA: Sheboygan Red Skins 32, Pittsburgh Pirates 49
- December 23, 1938 @ Oshkosh, WI: Pittsburgh Pirates 29, Oshkosh All-Stars 36
- December 25, 1938 @ Sheboygan, WI: Pittsburgh Pirates 38, Sheboygan Red Skins 43
- December 28, 1938 @ Pittsburgh, PA: Hammond Ciesar All-Americans 38, Pittsburgh Pirates 44
- January 4, 1939 @ Pittsburgh, PA: Indianapolis Kautskys 34, Pittsburgh Pirates 36
- January 7, 1939 @ Akron, OH: Akron Goodyear Wingfoots 26, Pittsburgh Pirates 29
- January 8, 1939 @ Hammond, IN: Pittsburgh Pirates 29, Hammond Ciesar All-Americans 55
- January 11, 1939 @ Pittsburgh, PA: Akron Goodyear Wingfoots 24, Pittsburgh Pirates 28
- January 12, 1939 @ Warren, PA: Pittsburgh Pirates 29, Warren Penns 27
- January 21, 1939 @ Pittsburgh, PA: Indianapolis Kautskys 42, Pittsburgh Pirates 43
- January 25, 1939 @ Pittsburgh, PA: Oshkosh All-Stars 36, Pittsburgh Pirates 46
- January 30, 1939 @ Indianapolis, IN: Pittsburgh Pirates 38, Indianapolis Kautskys 40
- February 1, 1939 @ Pittsburgh, PA: Warren Penns 43, Pittsburgh Pirates 51
- February 2, 1939 @ Akron, OH: Pittsburgh Pirates 33, Akron Firestone Non-Skids 41
- February 8, 1939: Sheboygan Red Skins 39, Pittsburgh Pirates 37 (OT @ Pittsburgh, PA)
- February 12, 1939 @ Hammond, IN: Pittsburgh Pirates 35, Hammond Ciesar All-Americans 31
- February 15, 1939 @ Pittsburgh, PA: Cleveland White Horses 32, Pittsburgh Pirates 34
- February 18, 1939 @ Akron, OH: Pittsburgh Pirates 49, Akron Goodyear Wingfoots 45
- February 23, 1939 @ Akron, OH: Pittsburgh Pirates 30, Akron Firestone Non-Skids 53
- March 1, 1939 @ Pittsburgh, PA: Oshkosh All-Stars 43, Pittsburgh Pirates 40
- March 2, 1939 @ Cleveland, OH: Pittsburgh Pirates 38, Cleveland White Horses 49
- March 9, 1939 @ Pittsburgh, PA: Akron Goodyear Wingfoots 42, Pittsburgh Pirates 41

A 28th game was intended to have been played between the Pirates and the Indianapolis Kautskys (with that game being intended to be a road game for Pittsburgh), but it was delayed and eventually cancelled due to weather issues in Indianapolis, Indiana, with that game not affecting the final standings in a significant manner (while the game might have potentially resulted in an average record for the Pittsburgh Pirates and by extension led to them being tied with both the Akron Goodyear Wingfoots and the Warren Penns/Cleveland White Horses in terms of standing positioning, due to the NBL Playoffs this season only showcasing the championship round between the Akron Firestone Non-Skids and the Oshkosh All-Stars as opposed to anything else this time around, the potential results for that game would not have been significant for this season's case because of that context).

== Awards and honors ==
- Paul Birch – All-NBL First Team
