= 1937–38 Pittsburgh Pirates season =

NBL professional basketball team season

- Head coach: Dudey Moore (player-coach)
- Owner: Meyer "Buck" Gefsky
- Arena: Duquesne U Gym

Results
- Record: 8–5 (.615)
- Place: Division: 3rd (Eastern)
- Playoff finish: Did not qualify

The 1937–38 Pittsburgh Pirates season was the first professional basketball season of play for the Pittsburgh Pirates NBL team in the city of Pittsburgh, Pennsylvania under the National Basketball League, which officially was the first season that it existed as a professional basketball league after previously existing as a semi-pro or amateur basketball league called the Midwest Basketball Conference in its first two seasons back in 1935. However, if one were to include their start as the Pittsburgh Y.M.H.A. team back in 1931 back when they were an amateur team from the Pittsburgh Young Men's Hebrew Association before they joined the Midwest Basketball Conference for the two seasons they played in that league before they both got rebranded into the respective names used here, this would officially be their sixth season of play as a franchise. Not only that, but if one includes their two seasons under the Pittsburgh Y.M.H.A. name, then the Y.M.H.A. turned Pirates franchise homaging the Major League Baseball franchise of the same name would actually join the Akron Firestone Non-Skids, the Indianapolis Kautskys, and the Dayton Metropolitans (who played their first MBC season as the Dayton Metropolitans before playing their second and final MBC season as the Dayton London Bobbys before returning to the Metropolitans name for the NBL's debut season under that same) as the only four MBC teams that played both seasons in that original league in question before moving on up into the NBL. In addition to that, they would be one of six teams to compete in the Eastern Division this season, with them representing thirteen inaugural NBL teams to compete in the first season under the NBL name, comprising six teams competing in the Eastern Division and seven teams competing in the Western Division.

== Season results ==
For this season, the newly rebranded Pittsburgh Pirates team would end up becoming one of the better teams in the NBL's inaugural season, with their head coaching replacement of the final Pittsburgh Y.M.H.A. head coach, Harry Menzel, with player-coach Dudey Moore taking over head coaching duties for the Pittsburgh squad when they moved from the MBC to the NBL this season following their name change. The Pittsburgh Pirates NBL squad would end up finishing this season with an 8–5 record, making them finish their first season in the NBL as a third place team. However, because they failed to acquire a better record than either of the Akron, Ohio works teams in the Akron Firestone Non-Skids and the eventual NBL champion Akron Goodyear Wingfoots, the Pittsburgh Pirates NBL team would fail to qualify for the inaugural 1938 NBL Playoffs since they only allowed for the two best teams in each division to compete in the playoffs in the early period of the NBL.

Due to the Pirates being one of six NBL teams to finish their season with a winning record, Pittsburgh would become one of seven NBL teams from this season to continue playing in the NBL's second season of existence. Weirdly enough, despite the Pirates having a winning record for their season, none of their players would qualify for either of the All-NBL Teams that the NBL announced during this season.

== Roster ==
Please note that due to the way records for professional basketball leagues like the NBL and the ABL were recorded at the time, some information on both teams and players may be harder to list out than usual here.

1937–38 Pittsburgh Pirates roster
Players

Pos.	No.	Player	Height	Weight	DOB	From
G/F		Herb Bonn	6 ft 0 in (1.83 m)	195 lb (88 kg)	1916–01–14	Duquesne
G		Hymie Ginsburg	5 ft 9 in (1.75 m)	170 lb (77 kg)	1914–03–23	Geneva
G		Bill Jesko	5 ft 10 in (1.78 m)	170 lb (77 kg)	1915–12–24	Pittsburgh
C		Ed Kweller	6 ft 6 in (1.98 m)	225 lb (102 kg)	1915–01–27	Duquesne
G		Tim Lawry	5 ft 10 in (1.78 m)	155 lb (70 kg)	1911–08–01	Pittsburgh
F		Walt Miller	6 ft 2 in (1.88 m)	190 lb (86 kg)	1915–07–30	Duquesne
G		Dudey Moore	5 ft 9 in (1.75 m)	180 lb (82 kg)	1910–04–05	Duquesne
G		Marty Reiter	5 ft 7 in (1.70 m)	160 lb (73 kg)	1911–08–25	Duquesne
G		Ted Rigg	6 ft 0 in (1.83 m)	175 lb (79 kg)	1913–06–07	Carnegie Mellon
G		Don Smith	6 ft 0 in (1.83 m)	170 lb (77 kg)	1910–10–18	Pittsburgh
C		Eddie Wisbar	6 ft 6 in (1.98 m)	200 lb (91 kg)	1916–05–03	Duquesne HS (PA)

Coaches
Head coach
- Dudey Moore

Legend
- (DP) Unsigned draft pick
- (FA) Free agent
- (S) Suspended
- Injured

Roster

== Regular season ==
=== Season standings ===
Pos.	Eastern Division	Wins	Losses	Win %
1	Akron Firestone Non-Skids	14	4	.778
2	Akron Goodyear Wingfoots	13	5	.722
3	Pittsburgh Pirates	8	5	.615
4	Buffalo Bisons	3	6	.333
5	Warren Penns	3	9	.250
6	Columbus Athletic Supply	1	12	.091

=== NBL Schedule ===
An official database created by John Grasso detailing every NBL match possible (outside of two matches that the Kankakee Gallagher Trojans won over the Dayton Metropolitans in 1938) would be released in 2026 showcasing every team's official schedules throughout their time spent in the NBL. As such, these are the official results recorded for the Pittsburgh Pirates basketball team in their first season in the NBL.

- December 1, 1937 @ Pittsburgh, PA: Buffalo Bisons 34, Pittsburgh Pirates 38
- December 5, 1937 @ Buffalo, NY: Pittsburgh Pirates 26, Buffalo Bisons 27
- December 8, 1937 @ Pittsburgh, PA: Akron Goodyear Wingfoots 30, Pittsburgh Pirates 26
- December 11, 1937 @ Warren, PA: Pittsburgh Pirates 31, Warren Penns 23
- December 15, 1937 @ Pittsburgh, PA: Warren Penns 34, Pittsburgh Pirates 36
- December 22, 1937 @ Pittsburgh, PA: Akron Firestone Non-Skids 33, Pittsburgh Pirates 43
- December 29, 1937: Indianapolis Kautskys 38, Pittsburgh Pirates 39 (OT @ Pittsburgh, PA)
- January 1, 1938 @ Akron, OH: Pittsburgh Pirates 33, Akron Goodyear Wingfoots 44
- January 2, 1938 @ Columbus, OH: Pittsburgh Pirates 41, Columbus Athletic Supply 37
- January 5, 1938 @ Pittsburgh, PA: Warren Penns 28, Pittsburgh Pirates 49
- January 9, 1938 @ Indianapolis, IN: Pittsburgh Pirates 27, Indianapolis Kautskys 35
- January 19, 1938 @ Pittsburgh, PA: Columbus Athletic Supply 34, Pittsburgh Pirates 59
- February 13, 1938 @ Akron, OH: Pittsburgh Pirates 41, Akron Firestone Non-Skids 43
