= 1935–36 Pittsburgh Y.M.H.A. season =

MBC professional basketball team season

- League: Midwest Basketball Conference
- Head coach: Meyer "Buck" Gefsky
- Owner(s): Young Men's Hebrew Association of Pittsburgh; Meyer "Buck" Gefsky
- Arena: Pittsburgh Y.M.H.A. Gym

Results
- Record: 10–7 (.588)
- Place: Division: 2nd (Eastern)
- Playoff finish: Lost Round-Robin Tournament Match to Indianapolis Kautskys, 18–46; Lost Third Place match over Akron Firestone Non-Skids, 29–33

The 1935–36 Pittsburgh Y.M.H.A. season was the first professional basketball season of play for the Pittsburgh Y.M.H.A. team in the city of Pittsburgh, Pennsylvania under the Midwest Basketball Conference (MBC), which would exist for one more season after this one before it rebranded itself into the United States' National Basketball League (NBL) by the 1937–38 season. However, if one were to include the independent seasons of play that they had when they were operating as an amateur team from Pittsburgh's own local Young Men's Hebrew Association all the way back in 1931 as the Pittsburgh Y.M.H.A. (sometimes being called the Pittsburgh Y.M.H.A.s or Pittsburgh Y.M.H.A.'s), this would be their sixth and final season of play under that name before later rebranding themselves as a professional basketball franchise under the Pittsburgh Pirates name honoring the Major League Baseball team of the same name. Under the combined work of Akron Firestone Non-Skids head coach Paul Sheeks and Indianapolis Kautskys owner and head coach Frank Kautsky, the two individuals would create the Midwest Basketball Conference as a sort of spiritual successor to the National Professional Basketball League that the two teams had played under, but with a whole new bunch of teams joining in this league to replace the original teams that were first in that version of the NPBL (many of which were no longer existing at the time), including a Canadian team and the amateur Pittsburgh Y.M.H.A. franchise. Because of the more loose structure in the MBC at the time, each division originally had four teams each before it later ended up adding a ninth team late into the season to have four teams in the Eastern Division (Pittsburgh's division) and five teams in the Western Division with the late addition of the Chicago Duffy Florals.

Originally, the Midwest Basketball Conference had the set requirement of needing its teams to have a bare minimum of only twelve games being played in order for a team to qualify for the inaugural MBC playoffs, which was originally planned to be a "double-knockout" system where each of the four teams would host the respective playoff matches in mind for the month of March in 1936. However, due to a combination of the Duffy Florals having a better overall win percentage than the Detroit Hed-Aids (with Chicago's 3–2 record barely beating out Detroit's 9–7 record this season), Chicago beating Detroit in a decisive manner in the only scheduled match they had played against each other within the MBC, and the Detroit Hed-Aids franchise facing potential financial issues at the time (at least according to Rochester Seagrams team owner Les Harrison), the Chicago Duffy Florals would end up taking the runner-up spot in the Western Division over the Detroit Hed-Aids. Not only that, but the originally planned "double-knockout" system that was planned to play out in Indianapolis, Chicago, Pittsburgh, and Akron to represent the Indianapolis Kautskys, Chicago Duffy Florals, Pittsburgh Y.M.H.A., and Akron Firestone Non-Skids respectively ultimately had to be converted into a round robin tournament format where every match in the tournament was played in the Chicago's White City Stadium on March 22, 1936 instead due to the four teams finding out that not everyone would have their respective venues available for their planned dates in the original tournament format the MBC had. In any case, the Pittsburgh squad that was competing in the inaugural MBC tournament with a second place finish in their division through a 10–7 record that was one game behind the Akron Firestone Non-Skids to lead the entire Eastern Division this season was seen as a team that was expected to be eliminated by the Indianapolis Kautskys in the opening match of the tournament, which did happen, though the spectators there likely did not expect a 46–18 beatdown from Indianapolis' end to open up that tournament. With Pittsburgh hoping to gain a sense of respectability in the third place match-up, they would perform a lot better against the Akron Firestone Non-Skids, but they still ended up losing 33–29 for a fourth place finish, with the controversially added Chicago Duffy Florals being the surprise team to win the inaugural league championship for this season after upsetting both Akron and Indianapolis in their own two matches of the day. Pittsburgh would have one more season be played in the MBC before it got renamed into the National Basketball League, with them renaming themselves into the Pittsburgh Pirates in honor of the Major League Baseball team of the same name once that change happened.

== Roster ==
Due to information on Midwest Basketball Conference players being generally hard to find, there are bound to be more gaps and/or inaccuracies found in certain areas on the team's roster spots than usual.

1935–36 Pittsburgh Y.M.H.A. roster
Players

Pos.	No.	Player	Height	Weight	DOB	From
G		Ganzy Benedict	5 ft 9 in (1.75 m)	165 lb (75 kg)	1905–11–29	Duquesne
F/C		Irv Brenner	6 ft 4 in (1.93 m)	200 lb (91 kg)	1913–05–30	Duquesne
F/C		Claire Cribbs	6 ft 3 in (1.91 m)	195 lb (88 kg)	1912–08–13	Pittsburgh
G/F		Art Feldman	6 ft 1 in (1.85 m)	170 lb (77 kg)	1912–10–18	Duquesne
G		Hymie Ginsburg	5 ft 9 in (1.75 m)	170 lb (77 kg)	1914–03–23	Geneva
C		Cliff Hutzley	6 ft 5 in (1.96 m)	200 lb (91 kg)	1911–08–29	Geneva
G		Charles Hughes	5 ft 11 in (1.80 m)	165 lb (75 kg)	1909–12–06	Pittsburgh
C		Hugh James	6 ft 7 in (2.01 m)	210 lb (95 kg)	1919–02–01	Carnegie Mellon
G		Dudey Moore	5 ft 9 in (1.75 m)	180 lb (82 kg)	1910–04–05	Duquesne
F		Bill Murphy	6 ft 1 in (1.85 m)	185 lb (84 kg)	1911–11–15	Duquesne
G		Marty Reiter	5 ft 7 in (1.70 m)	160 lb (73 kg)	1911–08–25	Duquesne
G		Red Silverman	5 ft 8 in (1.73 m)	160 lb (73 kg)	1910–10–15	Carnegie Mellon
C		Joe Stydahar	6 ft 4 in (1.93 m)	235 lb (107 kg)	1912–03–17	West Virginia

Coaches
Head coach
- Meyer "Buck" Gefsky

Legend
- (DP) Unsigned draft pick
- (FA) Free agent
- (S) Suspended
- Injured

Note: Irv Brenner, Art Feldman, Charles Hughes, Dudey Moore, and Joe Stydahar would all not take part in the inaugural MBC Playoffs, while Hugh James only competed in one of the two games played in the MBC's round-robin tournament that represented the playoffs for this season (though maybe he competed in both games played there instead).

== MBC Standings ==
=== Eastern Division ===
Pos.	Eastern Division	Wins	Losses	Win %
1	Akron Firestone Non-Skids	11	7	.611
2	Pittsburgh Y.M.H.A.	10	7	.588
3	Buffalo Bisons	7	8	.467
4	Dayton Metropolitans	4	6	.400

=== Western Division ===
Pos.	Western Division	Wins	Losses	Win %
1	Indianapolis Kautskys	9	3	.750
2	Chicago Duffy Florals‡	3	2	.600
3	Detroit Hed-Aids‡	9	7	.563
4	Indianapolis U.S. Tires	5	9	.357
5	Windsor Cooper Buses	2	11	.154
^{‡} Chicago would gain the final playoff spot over Detroit despite not meeting the required minimum of 12 games played.

== MBC Round-Robin Tournament ==
All of the Midwest Basketball Conference's round-robin tournament matches would occur on March 22, 1936 at the White City Stadium in Chicago, Illinois.

- Semifinal Round: (2E) Pittsburgh Y.M.H.A. Vs. (1W) Indianapolis Kautskys: Indianapolis Kautskys defeated the Pittsburgh Y.M.H.A. 46–18.
- Third Place Consolation Prize Round: (2E) Pittsburgh Y.M.H.A. Vs. (1E) Akron Firestone Non-Skids: Akron Firestone Non-Skids defeated the Pittsburgh Y.M.H.A. 33–29.

The Pittsburgh Y.M.H.A. squad finished their season with a fourth place finish for this season's inaugural MBC tournament.
