= 1935–36 Indianapolis Kautskys season =

MBC professional basketball team season

- Division champions
- League: Midwest Basketball Conference
- Head coach: Frank Kautsky
- General manager: Frank Kautsky
- Owner(s): Frank Kautsky; Pete Bailey
- Arena: Indianapolis Armory; Pennsy Gym

Results
- Record: 9–3 (.750)
- Place: Division: 1st (Western)
- Playoff finish: Lost MBC Championship (Lost 39–35 to Chicago Duffy Florals)

The 1935–36 Indianapolis Kautskys season was the first semi-professional basketball season of play that the Kautskys franchise would not only utilize that name for their team, but also played in the Midwest Basketball Conference (MBC), which would exist for one more season after this one before it rebranded itself into the United States' National Basketball League (NBL) by the 1937–38 season. However, if one were to include their previous seasons of play in the precursor of sorts to the MBC/NBL called the National Professional Basketball League (NPBL) and their few independent seasons of play they had before co-creating what would be the NPBL's successor in the Midwest Basketball Conference alongside the Akron Firestone Non-Skids, this would officially be (at least) their third season of play instead. After a couple of seasons of independent play, under the combined work of Kautskys team owner and head coach Frank Kautsky and Akron Firestone Non-Skids head coach Paul Sheeks, the two individuals would create the Midwest Basketball Conference as a sort of spiritual successor to the National Professional Basketball League that the two teams had played under, but with a whole new bunch of teams joining in this league to replace the original teams that were first in that version of the NPBL (many of which were no longer existing at the time), including a Canadian team. Because of the more loose structure in the MBC at the time, each division originally had four teams each before it later ended up adding a ninth team late into the season to have four teams in the Eastern Division and five teams in the Western Division (Indianapolis' division) with the late addition of the Chicago Duffy Florals. This would also be one of the later seasons of play for Hall of Famer John Wooden as a player while being a part of the Kautskys before he became a legendary head coach for the UCLA Bruins.

Originally, the Midwest Basketball Conference had the set requirement of needing its teams to have a bare minimum of only twelve games being played in order for a team to qualify for the inaugural MBC playoffs, which was originally planned to be a "double-knockout" system where each of the four teams would host the respective playoff matches in mind for the month of March in 1936. However, due to a combination of the Duffy Florals having a better overall win percentage than the Detroit Hed-Aids (with Chicago's 3–2 record barely beating out Detroit's 9–7 record this season), Chicago beating Detroit in a decisive manner in the only scheduled match they had played against each other within the MBC, and the Detroit Hed-Aids franchise facing potential financial issues at the time (at least according to Rochester Seagrams team owner Les Harrison), the Chicago Duffy Florals would end up taking the runner-up spot in the Western Division over the Detroit Hed-Aids. Not only that, but the originally planned "double-knockout" system that was planned to play out in Indianapolis, Chicago, Pittsburgh, and Akron to represent the Indianapolis Kautskys, Chicago Duffy Florals, Pittsburgh Y.M.H.A., and Akron Firestone Non-Skids respectively ultimately had to be converted into a round robin tournament format where every match in the tournament was played in the Chicago's White City Stadium on March 22, 1936, instead due to the four teams finding out that not everyone would have their respective venues available for their planned dates in the original tournament format the MBC had. Regardless of the circumstances in mind, Indianapolis was expected to make it to the championship round of the round-robin tournament due to them having the best winning percentage out of every team in the MBC this season with their 9–3 record for a credible first-place finish in the Western Division; while they would end up making it to the championship round, the spectators there likely did not expect a 46–18 beatdown by the Kautskys to start out that tournament. After waiting throughout the rest of the day to get the rest of the round-robin tournament completed, the final match of the night would have the Kautskys going up against the surprise team of the tournament in the Chicago Duffy Florals instead of the expected winners from that match in the Akron Firestone Non-Skids. Even so, for whatever reason, despite their best efforts possible, the Kautskys would end up being upset by the Duffy Florals in a 39–35 defeat for what would be their only championship appearance in MBC history. The Kautskys would have one more season be played in the MBC before it got renamed into the National Basketball League, with the Indianapolis squad eventually being the only franchise from the MBC to end up playing in the Basketball Association of America, which later became the National Basketball Association.

== Roster ==
Due to information on Midwest Basketball Conference players being generally hard to find, there are bound to be more gaps and/or inaccuracies found in certain areas on the team's roster spots than usual.

1935–36 Indianapolis Kautskys roster
Players

Pos.	No.	Player	Height	Weight	DOB	From
G/F		Frank Baird	5 ft 11 in (1.80 m)	160 lb (73 kg)	1912–04–10	Butler
C		Herman Berns	6 ft 4 in (1.93 m)	210 lb (95 kg)	1914–03–23	Wabash College
G/F		Herm Bottema	6 ft 3 in (1.91 m)	180 lb (82 kg)	1912–04–11	Arsenal Technical HS (IN)
F/C		George Chestnut	6 ft 5 in (1.96 m)	210 lb (95 kg)	1911–09–27	Indiana State
G/F		Bobby Colburn	5 ft 10 in (1.78 m)	190 lb (86 kg)	1911–03–23	Ohio State
C		Gene Maze	6 ft 5 in (1.96 m)	180 lb (82 kg)	1911–06–10	Earlham
F/C		William Perigo	6 ft 0 in (1.83 m)	180 lb (82 kg)	1911–09–17	Western Michigan
F		Cy Proffitt	6 ft 3 in (1.91 m)	190 lb (86 kg)	1911–10–26	Butler
G		Ed Shaver	6 ft 2 in (1.88 m)	195 lb (88 kg)	1913–02–07	Purdue
G		Jim Strickland	6 ft 2 in (1.88 m)	185 lb (84 kg)	1909–09–08	Indiana
G		Harlan Wilson	5 ft 11 in (1.80 m)	160 lb (73 kg)	1914–02–03	Central (IN)
G		Cat Wooden	6 ft 0 in (1.83 m)	180 lb (82 kg)	1907–11–22	Franklin (IN)
G/F		John Wooden	5 ft 10 in (1.78 m)	185 lb (84 kg)	1910–10–14	Purdue

Coaches
Head coach
- Frank Kautsky

Legend
- (DP) Unsigned draft pick
- (FA) Free agent
- (S) Suspended
- Injured

Note: The roster for the team during the round-robin tournament in the MBC this year includes Frank Baird, George Chestnut, Bob Kessler, Bill Perigo, Cy Proffitt, and future Hall of Famer John Wooden.

== MBC Standings ==
=== Eastern Division ===
Pos.	Eastern Division	Wins	Losses	Win %
1	Akron Firestone Non-Skids	11	7	.611
2	Pittsburgh Y.M.H.A.	10	7	.588
3	Buffalo Bisons	7	8	.467
4	Dayton Metropolitans	4	6	.400

=== Western Division ===
Pos.	Western Division	Wins	Losses	Win %
1	Indianapolis Kautskys	9	3	.750
2	Chicago Duffy Florals‡	3	2	.600
3	Detroit Hed-Aids‡	9	7	.563
4	Indianapolis U.S. Tires	5	9	.357
5	Windsor Cooper Buses	2	11	.154
^{‡} Chicago would gain the final playoff spot over Detroit despite not meeting the required minimum of 12 games played.

== MBC Round-Robin Tournament ==
All of the Midwest Basketball Conference's round-robin tournament matches would occur on March 22, 1936, at the White City Stadium in Chicago, Illinois.

- Semifinal Round: (1W) Indianapolis Kautskys Vs. (2E) Pittsburgh Y.M.H.A.: Indianapolis Kautskys defeated the Pittsburgh Y.M.H.A. 46–18.
- Championship Round: (1W) Indianapolis Kautskys Vs. (2W) Chicago Duffy Florals: Chicago Duffy Florals defeated the Indianapolis Kautskys 39–35.

The Indianapolis Kautskys would finish the inaugural 1936 MBC Round-Robin Tournament with a second-place finish thanks to a surprising upset loss to the Chicago Duffy Florals.
