= 1937–38 Warren Penns season =

NBL professional basketball team season

- Head coach: Gerry Archibald (player-coach)
- Owner: Gerry Archibald
- Arena: Beaty Jr. High Gym

Results
- Record: 3–9 (.250)
- Place: Division: 5th (Eastern)
- Playoff finish: Did not qualify (Missed 13 game draw to qualify for the NBL Playoffs.)

The 1937–38 Warren Penns season was the first professional basketball season of play for the Warren Penns in the small town of Warren, Pennsylvania at the Beaty Jr. High Gym within the Warren County School District under the National Basketball League, which officially was the first season that it existed as a professional basketball league after previously existing as a semi-pro or amateur basketball league called the Midwest Basketball Conference in its first two seasons back in 1935. However, if one were to include their previous seasons where they first started out as a team in the Central Basketball League called the Warren Buckeyes back in 1926 before becoming an independent team called the Warren Crescents, the Corry Keystones of the short-lived original NYPBL, the Warren Merchants, and the Warren Transits before becoming the Warren HyVis Oils (sometimes being expanded out more into the Warren HyVis Oilers instead) up until joining the MBC in their previous season of play, this would officially be the franchise's thirteenth season of existence as a team.

== Season overview ==
The franchise was one of nine MBC teams from the previous season (one of ten overall MBC teams, including the original Buffalo Bisons NBL team) to join the inaugural NBL season as it rebranded itself from the MBC to the NBL professional basketball league, with the Richmond King Clothiers / Cincinnati Comellos, Kankakee Gallagher Trojans, and the Oshkosh All-Stars (the last team by December 1937) being the only non-MBC teams joining the NBL for this season. They also were one of six teams to compete in the Eastern Division this season, with them representing thirteen inaugural NBL teams to compete in the first season under the NBL name, comprising six teams competing in the Eastern Division and seven teams competing in the Western Division. Warren's continued existence from the MBC into the NBL even without them utilizing the HyVis Oils branding for the team's name during this season (and for most of the following season within the NBL afterward) related to the clever marketing and promotional dealership work behind the scenes for business operations out of team owner, general manager, and player-coach Gerry Archibald.

In their first season of existence in the NBL, the Warren Penns would end up getting a poor 3–9 record for a fifth-place finish in the Eastern Division (with them being only better than the Columbus Athletic Supply team that had the worst record in the entire NBL this season in terms of fellow Eastern Division teams), with the Penns getting their record thanks to a less than decent 2–3 home record to go with a brutal 1–6 road record for their season. Even then, they wouldn't have qualified for the NBL Playoffs anyway due to them not playing a minimum of 13 games for this season in order to do so. However, despite ending their season with a poor record, the Warren Penns would be one of seven teams from the inaugural NBL season to enter the second NBL season of play under that new league name, though they wouldn't keep the Warren Penns name by the conclusion of that second season there.

== Roster ==
Please note that due to the way records for professional basketball leagues like the NBL and the ABL were recorded at the time, some information on both teams and players may be harder to list out than usual here.

Player	Position
Gerry Archibald	G
Bill Holland	F-C
Stub Jacobson	C
Bob Lytle	F
Red Malackany	G
Frank Maury	G
Emmett Morrison	F-G
Johnny Pawk	F
Steve Pawk	F-C
Walt Stanky	F-C
Jack Stirling	C
Reno Strand	G-F

== Regular season ==
=== NBL Season standings ===
Pos.	Eastern Division	Wins	Losses	Win %
1	Akron Firestone Non-Skids	14	4	.778
2	Akron Goodyear Wingfoots	13	5	.722
3	Pittsburgh Pirates	8	5	.615
4	Buffalo Bisons	3	6	.333
5	Warren Penns	3	9	.250
6	Columbus Athletic Supply	1	12	.091

=== NBL Schedule ===
An official database created by John Grasso detailing every NBL match possible (outside of two matches that the Kankakee Gallagher Trojans won over the Dayton Metropolitans in 1938) would be released in 2026 showcasing every team's official schedules throughout their time spent in the NBL. As such, these are the official results recorded for the Warren Penns in their first season (and only full season when using that specific team name) while in the NBL.

- December 11, 1937 @ Warren, PA: Pittsburgh Pirates 31, Warren Penns 23
- December 14, 1937 @ Warren, PA: Akron Firestone Non-Skids 43, Warren Penns 21
- December 15, 1937 @ Pittsburgh, PA: Pittsburgh Pirates 36, Warren Penns 34
- December 18, 1937 @ Warren, PA: Buffalo Bisons 25, Warren Penns 33
- December 26, 1937 @ Buffalo, NY: Warren Penns 21, Buffalo Bisons 33 (Experimented with using 3 periods that were 15 minutes of length similar to the rivaling American Basketball League as opposed to the more typical 4 quarters that would be 10 minutes long on the NBL's end for their games.)
- January 3, 1938 @ Warren, PA: Akron Goodyear Wingfoots 43, Warren Penns 23
- January 5, 1938 @ Pittsburgh, PA: Warren Penns 28, Pittsburgh Pirates 49
- January 8, 1938 @ Warren, PA: Fort Wayne General Electrics 26, Warren Penns 30
- January 27, 1938 @ Fort Wayne, IN: Warren Penns 25, Fort Wayne General Electrics 63
- January 28, 1938 @ Akron, OH: Warren Penns 17, Akron Goodyear Wingfoots 42
- January 30, 1938: Dayton Metropolitans 30, Warren Penns 31 (OT @ Dayton, OH)
- February 8, 1938 @ Warren PA: Akron Firestone Non-Skids 42, Warren Penns 32
