= 1935–36 Dayton Metropolitans season =

MBC professional basketball team season

- League: Midwest Basketball Conference
- Head coach: Bill Hosket Sr. (player-coach)
- Owner(s): Dayton Metropolitan Clothing Stores
- Arena: Montgomery County Fairgrounds Coliseum

Results
- Record: 4–6 (.400)
- Place: Division: 4th (Eastern)
- Playoff finish: Did not qualify

The 1935–36 Dayton Metropolitans season was the inaugural season of play for the Dayton Metropolitans in the inaugural season of existence for the Midwest Basketball Conference (MBC), which would exist for one more season after this one before it rebranded itself into the United States' National Basketball League (NBL) by the 1937–38 season. Under the combined work of Akron Firestone Non-Skids head coach Paul Sheeks and Indianapolis Kautskys owner and head coach Frank Kautsky, the two individuals would create the Midwest Basketball Conference as a sort of spiritual successor to the National Professional Basketball League that the two teams had played under, but with a whole new bunch of teams joining in this league to replace the original teams that were first in that version of the NPBL (many of which were no longer existing at the time), including a Canadian team and the Dayton Metropolitans. Because of the more loose structure in the MBC at the time, each division originally had four teams each before it later ended up adding a ninth team late into the season to have four teams in the Eastern Division (Dayton's division) and five teams in the Western Division with the late addition of the Chicago Duffy Florals. Unfortunately for Dayton, they would end up being the worst team in the Eastern Division, as they finished the season with a below-average 4–6 finish for last place in their division (though it wouldn't be the worst record in the league that season). Following this season's conclusion, the Dayton Metropolitans would be sold off from the Dayton Metropolitan Clothing Stores to the Miami Valley Brewing Company to be rebranded as the Dayton London Bobbys for the second and final MBC season of play before returning to the Dayton Metropolitans name in time for the 1937–38 National Basketball League season.

== Roster ==
Due to information on Midwest Basketball Conference players being generally hard to find, there are bound to be more gaps and/or inaccuracies found in certain areas on the team's roster spots than usual.

| Player | Position |
|---|---|
| Bobby Colburn | G-F |
| Cookie Cunningham | F-C |
| Bill Hosket Sr. | C |
| Herbie Hutchisson | G |
| Buck Lamme | G |
| Bus McMillen | G-F |
| Gene Mechling | G |
| Max Padlow | G-F |
| Howard Stammler | G-F |
| Norm Wagner | C |
| Red Wilson | C-F |

== MBC Standings ==
=== Eastern Division ===
| Pos. | Eastern Division | Wins | Losses | Win % |
|---|---|---|---|---|
| 1 | Akron Firestone Non-Skids | 11 | 7 | .611 |
| 2 | Pittsburgh Y.M.H.A. | 10 | 7 | .588 |
| 3 | Buffalo Bisons | 7 | 8 | .467 |
| 4 | Dayton Metropolitans | 4 | 6 | .400 |

=== Western Division ===
| Pos. | Western Division | Wins | Losses | Win % |
|---|---|---|---|---|
| 1 | Indianapolis Kautskys | 9 | 3 | .750 |
| 2 | Chicago Duffy Florals‡ | 3 | 2 | .600 |
| 3 | Detroit Hed-Aids‡ | 9 | 7 | .563 |
| 4 | Indianapolis U.S. Tires | 5 | 9 | .357 |
| 5 | Windsor Cooper Buses | 2 | 11 | .154 |
^{‡} Chicago would gain the final playoff spot over Detroit despite not meeting the required minimum of 12 games played.
