= 1935–36 Midwest Basketball Conference season =

1935–36 MBC season
- League: Midwest Basketball Conference
- Sport: Basketball
- Duration: November 1935 – February 1936; March 22, 1936 (Round Robin Tournament)
- Games: 5-18
- Teams: 8 (later 9^{note})

Regular season
- Season champions: Indianapolis Kautskys
- Top scorer: Soup Cable (Akron Firestone Non-Skids; total points); Leroy Edwards (Indianapolis U.S. Tires; PPG average)

Round Robin Tournament
- Eastern champions: Akron Firestone Non-Skids
- Eastern runners-up: Pittsburgh Y.M.H.A.
- Western champions: Indianapolis Kautskys
- Western runners-up: Chicago Duffy Florals

Championship
- Venue: White City Stadium, Chicago, Illinois
- Champions: Chicago Duffy Florals
- Runners-up: Indianapolis Kautskys

NPBL/MBC seasons
- ← 1932–33 (NPBL) 1936–37 (MBC) →

The 1935–36 MBC season was the first, inaugural season of the Midwest Basketball Conference (a league that has been considered by sports historians to either be an amateur basketball league or a semipro basketball league) under that name before it got rebranded into the U.S.A.'s National Basketball League (NBL), with it also being considered the first official season for that league as well before properly utilizing the National Basketball League name in its future. Despite the MBC creating plenty of rule changes that would be implemented for the sport of basketball that would still be used in the present-day, their first season would still end in controversy due to them not only having the last-minute addition of the Chicago Duffy Florals taking a playoff spot over the Detroit Hed-Aids despite Chicago having a better win percentage due to Detroit having more wins and Chicago not meeting the minimum number of games played this season for required games played to qualify for their inaugural playoff system, but also having the Chicago Duffy Florals later winning the inaugural championship in a surprising upset over the Indianapolis Kautskys in a Round Robin Tournament format that lasted for only one whole day.

== Creation of the League ==
The MBC was the initiative of Indianapolis Kautskys team owner, head coach, and general manager Frank Kautsky and Akron Firestone Non-Skids head coach and general manager Paul Sheeks, who both decided they wanted to compete in a new professional basketball league of sorts after previously playing a season for the short-lived National Professional Basketball League (a short-lived precursor of sorts to the NBL that would exist not long afterward due to it featuring both the Kautskys (a team owned and operated by Frank Kautsky under Kautsky's Grocery store business) and Firestone Non-Skids (a team owned and operated by the Firestone Tire and Rubber Company), alongside a third team from that league that later joined the MBC/NBL) and essentially wanting to revive it for something new both in regards to cheap advertising for businesses that they had and as a morale booster for the employees that were also considered basketball players during this time.

A book focusing on the NBL's existence was released in 2009 by historian and author Murry R. Nelson called "The National Basketball League: A History, 1935–1949", with an entire chapter being dedicated to both this and the following season of play for the purpose of detailing what led to the creation of the MBC, how the MBC's newer rules it implemented and its community driven focus would help shape the future of the sport of basketball as we know it, and how it later became the NBL for its future seasons to come.

== Teams ==
Before beginning this season, the MBC would begin with an established eight teams joining the newly created league; joining the Akron Firestone Non-Skids and Indianapolis Kautskys (who both established the idea as a way to get back into a professional basketball league while doing so under better circumstances than their original run at the National Professional Basketball League), the likes of the Buffalo Bisons (a barnstorming franchise following their original runs in the original American Basketball League and the short-lived New York State Basketball League), the Dayton Metropolitans (who were sponsored by the Dayton Metropolitan Clothing Stores), the Detroit Hed-Aids (who were sponsored by a headache cure company called Hed-Aids), the Indianapolis U.S. Tires (who operated as inner city rivals to the Indianapolis Kautskys sponsored by U.S. Tire, Inc.), the Pittsburgh Y.M.H.A. (a young men's team created by the local Young Men's Hebrew Association, as it was known at the time), and the Canadian-based Windsor Cooper Buses (who were owned and operated by the Cooper Buses company) out in Windsor, Ontario, thus technically making this season in the MBC the first season to have a truly international basketball league, beating out the Basketball Association of America's Toronto Huskies from the 1946–47 BAA season for that honor by over a decade. Not only that, but the Rochester Seagrams (who later became the Rochester Royals in the NBL and still exist in the present day as the Sacramento Kings in the NBA) were also considered interested in joining the MBC as well, but they ultimately decided to not enter the new league due to travel concerns for the team at that point in time, with travel being done on the road through automobiles on non-paved roads instead of trains or even planes, with freeways created during this time being nothing more than just being lines done on a map. Former University of Pittsburgh head coach Doc Carlson was named the head commissioner of the Midwest Basketball Conference during its first two seasons of play. At some late point during this season, a ninth team from Chicago, Illinois called the Chicago Duffy Florals (a team owned and operated by a floral concern of sorts) became a late entry into the MBC's inaugural season, making them go from eight teams to nine teams during the season. However, because of the looser scheduling requirements where the MBC planned to have teams play only a minimum of twelve games to qualify for the upcoming MBC Playoffs at the time, there were no real concerns regarding the number of games played for the season at hand at that point in time.

Eastern Division	Akron Firestone Non-Skids Akron, Ohio	Buffalo Bisons Buffalo, New York
Eastern Division	Dayton Metropolitans Dayton, Ohio	Pittsburgh Y.M.H.A. Pittsburgh, Pennsylvania
Western Division	Chicago Duffy Florals Chicago, Illinois	Detroit Hed-Aids Detroit, Michigan
Western Division	Indianapolis Kautskys Indianapolis, Indiana	Indianapolis U.S. Tires Indianapolis, Indiana
Western Division	Windsor Cooper Buses Windsor, Ontario, Canada	

== Basketball Rule Changes ==
One rule that the MBC implemented that would help change the sport of basketball forever was the removal of the center court jump ball between teams after every made free-throw, which was done to help speed up professional basketball games since it had been noticed that teams that had a dominant center there would have the clear cut advantage in jump ball situations there. The removal of jump balls after free-throws that were made by the MBC would later cause the jump ball after made free-throws rule to be removed from other professional basketball leagues alongside college basketball a couple of years afterward, especially with Jim Tobin of the International Rules Committee noting that the rule worked out very successfully in international countries that tried that rule out. The MBC would also allow for home teams to decide whether the jump ball after making baskets in general should be allowed for the game that was played or not, which Indianapolis Kautskys player and later UCLA head coach John Wooden described as "the most significant rule change ever made". Other rules that helped out the MBC during this season of play included players being fouled out of a game if they had five fouls on them instead of what was considered the standard four at the time (though a player can return to action if the team in question was down to four remaining players at a certain point, with the likely condition of gaining what can be considered technical fouls instead of just extra fouls to their names); the start of the dribble or traveling would not be called under what can be considered a "too close" basis unless a real advantage were gained from those notions; and fouls on the offensive end would be called only if the player was shooting or if them trying to advance the ball was affected, unless the foul was deemed to be a flagrant foul. Official MBC games scheduled during this season and the following season afterward were primarily held on Sundays due to blue laws in the United States being very significant in those areas at the time. Usually, those blue laws were enforced by either the people themselves or the churches that were involved with those blue laws to help prevent entertainment offerings like professional basketball games being played, with Saturday oftentimes being considered a work day and Sundays being the one day that citizens were allowed to play after attending church. The first African-American player to play in a professional basketball league of sorts that would be considered fully integrated by white players otherwise would be a player named Hank Williams for the Buffalo Bisons.

== Tournament Controversies ==
Despite the season ending with the intentions of having the Detroit Hed-Aids competing alongside the Akron Firestone Non-Skids, Indianapolis Kautskys, and the Pittsburgh Y.M.H.A. squad due to them playing the necessary minimum number of games required for the inaugural MBC Playoffs to begin, the inaugural MBC Playoffs ended up getting the Chicago Duffy Florals (who had played a league low total of five games for a 3–2 record there, which had a higher win percentage than the 9–7 record that the Detroit Hed-Aids had, though at the cost of being more games behind first place in the process) partially due to the better win percentage, partially due to the one win that the Duffy Florals had over the Hed-Aids being a significant one in terms of records held (especially since it was noted that Chicago won over Detroit that day in a decisive manner), and partially because of Chicago being seen as more financially viable for the new league to play their playoff games in than Detroit would be (though the owner of the Rochester Seagrams franchise at the time, Les Harrison, had reported that the reasons didn't necessarily relate to money so much as it did Detroit's potentially shaky nature as a franchise by this point in time). This controversial decision would later greatly affect the MBC Playoffs this season in the process.

Originally, the inaugural MBC Playoffs were planned to have the four playoff teams in question in Akron, Chicago (as opposed to Detroit), Indianapolis, and Pittsburgh meet in a "double-knockout" system with games staged at Indianapolis on March 8, at Chicago on March 15, at Pittsburgh on March 21, and at Akron for the Firestone Clubhouse nearby the Firestone Country Club a day later on March 22, 1936. However, when the four team owners found out that not every home venue would be available for those planned dates in question, the four owners agreed to a round robin tournament style of formatting on March 20–22, 1936 before later modifying that to be a one-day affair on March 22 at the White City Stadium in Chicago with Indianapolis going up against Pittsburgh in the morning, Chicago going up against Akron in the early afternoon game, the losers of those matches competing in a third place consolation prize match, and the winners competing for the inaugural MBC championship on the same day.

== Assessment ==
Following the end of the season, the MBC itself considered its progress a success due to it showcasing great stability when compared to most other attempts at professional basketball leagues in the last twenty or so years before this point in time due to every team surviving the end of the regular season and playoffs, as well as there being some good crowds coming into numerous cities alongside the best players in the sport for each region involved actually playing for the teams involved with the respective regions in question. While the players weren't paid particularly highly (due in part to the effects of the Great Depression), they had considered the MBC's games to be a good source of secondary income (akin to a hobby) for that period of time, with their genuine love for the game of basketball being the key factor for them to keep going despite the lower than expected pay and poor travel conditions on a game-by-game basis for this season, to the point where some players were late to work for their main jobs at certain points in time. After this season's conclusion (albeit with controversy regarding their first ever championship held), the MBC played one more season before it later rebranded itself to the National Basketball League.

== Final standings ==
=== Eastern Division ===
Pos.	Eastern Division	Wins	Losses	Win %
1	Akron Firestone Non-Skids	11	7	.611
2	Pittsburgh Y.M.H.A.	10	7	.588
3	Buffalo Bisons	7	8	.467
4	Dayton Metropolitans	4	6	.400

=== Western Division ===
Pos.	Western Division	Wins	Losses	Win %
1	Indianapolis Kautskys	9	3	.750
2	Chicago Duffy Florals‡	3	2	.600
3	Detroit Hed-Aids‡	9	7	.563
4	Indianapolis U.S. Tires	5	9	.357
5	Windsor Cooper Buses	2	11	.154
^{‡} Chicago would gain the final playoff spot over Detroit despite not meeting the required minimum of 12 games played.

== Playoffs ==
Originally, the inaugural 1936 MBC Playoffs was intended to be a "double-knockout" tournament set to have games played in each of the four playoffs teams' home venues (Indianapolis on March 8, Chicago on March 15, Pittsburgh on March 21, and Akron on March 22) before the discovery of not everyone having their home venues being available on their respective dates in 1936 caused the four teams to instead host a round robin tournament format that was planned to go from March 20–22 in Chicago before ultimately hosting all four of the round robin games in Chicago on one day for March 22, 1936 instead.

The round robin tournament involved had the first game of the day occur in the morning between the Indianapolis Kautskys (the best team in the Western Division) and the Pittsburgh Y.M.H.A. squad (the second-best team of the Eastern Division this season) with the second game in the early afternoon being between the Akron Firestone Non-Skids works team (the best team of the Eastern Division) and the local hometown team for the event in the Chicago Duffy Florals (which was the second-best team of the Western Division, albeit controversially so due to their unique status in the MBC this season), with the losing teams playing a third place consolation prize game later in the afternoon before the remaining winning teams competed at night for the league's first ever championship.

For the early morning game, the Indianapolis Kautskys would crush the Pittsburgh Y.M.H.A. squad with a 46–18 beatdown, while the early afternoon game saw an upset occur with the Chicago Duffey Florals stunning the Akron Firestone Non-Skids with a close 33–30 victory, disappointing many Akron fans who had expected their team to compete in the championship match that was expected to feature the Indianapolis squad for the championship match-up there. However, the Firestone Non-Skids would win the third place consolation prize game against the Pittsburgh Y.M.H.A. squad with a close 33–29 victory in the late afternoon. This was before the game played at night saw the home town Chicago Duffy Florals squad surprisingly upset the Indianapolis Kautskys with a 39–35 upset victory to see the Duffy Florals be the surprising first ever MBC champions in the new league.

MBC Round Robin Tournament
W1	Indianapolis Kautskys	46
E2	Pittsburgh Y.M.H.A.	18
E1	Akron Firestone Non-Skids	30
W2	Chicago Duffy Florals*	33

MBC Championship
W1	Indianapolis Kautskys	35
W2	Chicago Duffy Florals*	39
Third Place Consolation
E1	Akron Firestone Non-Skids	33
E2	Pittsburgh Y.M.H.A.	29

- Bold Series winner
- * – The Chicago Duffy Florals would take the playoff spot that would have been held by the Detroit Hed-Aids instead had the intended rules of playing a minimum number of regular season games (in this season's case, twelve games played) taken effect here.

== Leading scorers ==
Prior to the 1969–70 NBA season, league leaders in points were determined by totals rather than averages. Also, rebounding and assist numbers were not recorded properly in the MBC like they would be in the BAA/NBA, as would field goal and free-throw shooting percentages. With that being said, due to the Midwest Basketball Conference not having a set amount of standardized games played for each team this season, there would be no true set scoring leader for the MBC this season, with a few players having an incomplete set amount of data at hand for one reason or another.

However, the player that scored the most points in the MBC this season was Soup Cable for the Akron Firestone Non-Skids, while the player that had the highest scoring average for this season would be Leroy Edwards of the Indianapolis U.S. Tires with an average of 10.5 points per game in thirteen games played. This was ahead of John Wooden for the rivaling Indianapolis Kautskys with an average of 10.1 points per game in nine total games played and Soup Cable, who only averaged 8.4 points per game in the 18 games played with Akron.

== See also ==
- National Basketball League (United States)
