= 1935–36 Akron Firestone Non-Skids season =

MBC professional basketball team season

- Division champions
- League: Midwest Basketball Conference
- Head coach: Paul Sheeks
- Owner(s): Firestone
- Arena: Firestone Clubhouse

Results
- Record: 11–7 (.611)
- Place: Division: 2nd (Eastern)
- Playoff finish: Lost Round-Robin Tournament Match to Chicago Duffy Florals, 30–33; Won Third Place match over Pittsburgh Y.M.H.A., 33–29

The 1935–36 Akron Firestone Non-Skids season was the Firestone Non-Skids' first year in the Midwest Basketball Conference (MBC), which was also the inaugural year of that league's existence before it eventually rebranded itself into the United States' National Basketball League (NBL) by the 1937–38 season. However, if one were to include their previous seasons of play in the precursor of sorts to the MBC/NBL called the National Professional Basketball League (NPBL) and the couple of independent seasons of play they had before co-creating what would be the NPBL's successor in the Midwest Basketball Conference alongside the Indianapolis Kautskys, this would officially be (at least) their fifth season of play instead. Under the combined work of Firestone Non-Skids head coach Paul Sheeks and Indianapolis Kautskys owner and head coach Frank Kautsky, the two individuals would create the Midwest Basketball Conference as a sort of spiritual successor to the National Professional Basketball League that the two teams had played under, but with a whole new bunch of teams joining in this league to replace the original teams that were first in that version of the NPBL (many of which were no longer existing at the time), including a Canadian team. Because of the more loose structure in the MBC at the time, each division originally had four teams each before it later ended up adding a ninth team late into the season to have four teams in the Eastern Division (Akron's division) and five teams in the Western Division with the late addition of the Chicago Duffy Florals. (Incidentally, Firestone's team represented one of the top teams that were considered company teams (works teams with year-round jobs for the player employees who weren't really paid for playing basketball, but owed their jobs within the company thanks (in part) to their basketball skills), which competed alongside teams that were operated by a basketball man, but were supported by a business and took on their business' name as a part of the franchise's team name in exchange (though that specific team wasn't there in the MBC's inaugural season outside of maybe the Pittsburgh Y.M.H.A. team involving the local Young Men's Hebrew Association); teams that were both named for and operated by businessmen for their own local interests and investments (such as the Indianapolis Kautskys); and teams that were considered to be completely independent by comparison to the rest of the group of teams there (such as the (original) Buffalo Bisons) to represent the four types of teams competing in both the MBC and its immediate successor in the NBL.)

Originally, the Midwest Basketball Conference had the set requirement of needing its teams to have a bare minimum of only twelve games being played in order for a team to qualify for the inaugural MBC playoffs, which was originally planned to be a "double-knockout" system where each of the four teams would host the respective playoff matches in mind for the month of March in 1936. However, due to a combination of the Duffy Florals having a better overall win percentage than the Detroit Hed-Aids (with Chicago's 3–2 record barely beating out Detroit's 9–7 record this season), Chicago beating Detroit in a decisive manner in the only scheduled match they had played against each other within the MBC, and the Detroit Hed-Aids franchise facing potential financial issues at the time (at least according to Rochester Seagrams team owner Les Harrison), the Chicago Duffy Florals would end up taking the runner-up spot in the Western Division over the Detroit Hed-Aids. Not only that, but the originally planned "double-knockout" system that was planned to play out in Indianapolis, Chicago, Pittsburgh, and Akron to represent the Indianapolis Kautskys, Chicago Duffy Florals, Pittsburgh Y.M.H.A., and Akron Firestone Non-Skids respectively ultimately had to be converted into a round-robin tournament format where every match in the tournament was played in the Chicago's White City Stadium on March 22, 1936 instead due to the four teams finding out that not everyone would have their respective venues available for their planned dates in the original tournament format the MBC had. In spite of the awkward changes to the original tournament's set-up in mind, Akron was originally projected to win their semifinal match-up against Chicago, with the championship match being planned to have the Firestone Non-Skids and the Kautskys competing for the inaugural MBC championship. However, the Firestone squad would instead be stunned by a surprise performance from the upstart Chicago Duffy Florals, as they would defeat the Akron squad with a 33–30 upset performance, which led to the Firestone Non-Skids settling for a third place finish in the MBC instead with a 33–29 victory over the Pittsburgh Y.M.H.A. squad that was previously blown out by the Indianapolis Kautskys in their semifinal match. The Firestone Non-Skids would have one more season be played in the MBC before it got renamed into the National Basketball League.

== Roster ==
Due to information on Midwest Basketball Conference players being generally hard to find, there are bound to be more gaps and/or inaccuracies found in certain areas on the team's roster spots than usual.

1935–36 Akron Firestone Non-Skids roster
Players

Pos.	No.	Player	Height	Weight	DOB	From
C		Beanie Berens	6 ft 5 in (1.96 m)	190 lb (86 kg)	1913–02–26	Ohio
G		Bill Brandy	6 ft 0 in (1.83 m)	180 lb (82 kg)	1909–07–23	Heidelberg College
G		Soup Cable	6 ft 3 in (1.91 m)	200 lb (91 kg)	1913–04–04	West High School (OH)
G		Russ Estey	5 ft 11 in (1.80 m)	165 lb (75 kg)	1910–05–31	Akron
F/C		Ed Garner	6 ft 3 in (1.91 m)	200 lb (91 kg)	1912–08–14	Northwest Missouri State
G/F		Jack Gebbie	6 ft 1 in (1.85 m)	175 lb (79 kg)	1912–01–14	Illinois
G/F		Lefty Haas	5 ft 11 in (1.80 m)	180 lb (82 kg)	1906–03–15	Gettysburg
G		Bill Reeves	5 ft 10 in (1.78 m)	165 lb (75 kg)	1904–12–05	Central (IN)
C		Ed Sadowski	6 ft 5 in (1.96 m)	190 lb (86 kg)	1917–07–11	North HS (OH)
F/C		Jack Shaffer	6 ft 3 in (1.91 m)	190 lb (86 kg)	1909–08–13	DePaul
C		Slim Shoun	6 ft 11 in (2.11 m)	210 lb (95 kg)	1904–10–04	Carson–Newman

Coaches
Head coach
- Paul Sheeks

Legend
- (DP) Unsigned draft pick
- (FA) Free agent
- (S) Suspended
- Injured

Note: Beanie Berens, Bill Brandy, Russ Estey, Jack Gebby, and Lefty Haas would all not participate in the inaugural MBC playoffs for one reason or another, Ed Sadowski only played with the team during the MBC's round-robin tournament playoffs.

== MBC Standings ==
=== Eastern Division ===
Pos.	Eastern Division	Wins	Losses	Win %
1	Akron Firestone Non-Skids	11	7	.611
2	Pittsburgh Y.M.H.A.	10	7	.588
3	Buffalo Bisons	7	8	.467
4	Dayton Metropolitans	4	6	.400

=== Western Division ===
Pos.	Western Division	Wins	Losses	Win %
1	Indianapolis Kautskys	9	3	.750
2	Chicago Duffy Florals‡	3	2	.600
3	Detroit Hed-Aids‡	9	7	.563
4	Indianapolis U.S. Tires	5	9	.357
5	Windsor Cooper Buses	2	11	.154
^{‡} Chicago would gain the final playoff spot over Detroit despite not meeting the required minimum of 12 games played.

== MBC Round-Robin Tournament ==
All of the Midwest Basketball Conference's round-robin tournament matches would occur on March 22, 1936 at the White City Stadium in Chicago, Illinois.

- Semifinal Round: (1E) Akron Firestone Non-Skids Vs. (2W) Chicago Duffy Florals: Chicago Duffy Florals defeated the Akron Firestone Non-Skids 33–30.
- Third Place Consolation Prize Round: (1E) Akron Firestone Non-Skids Vs. (2E) Pittsburgh Y.M.H.A.: Akron Firestone Non-Skids defeated the Pittsburgh Y.M.H.A. 33–29.

The Akron Firestone Non-Skids finished the season with a third place finish for this season's inaugural MBC tournament.
