= 1932–33 Indianapolis Kautskys season =

NPBL professional basketball team season

- League: National Professional Basketball League
- Head coach: Frank Kautsky
- General manager: Frank Kautsky
- Owner(s): Frank Kautsky; Pete Bailey
- Arena: Indianapolis Armory

Results
- Record: 7–4 (.636)
- Place: Division: 3rd
- Playoff finish: Did not qualify

The 1932–33 Indianapolis Kautskys season was the first official season in the franchise's history where the team played as the Indianapolis Kautskys properly after playing their previous independent season as the Indianapolis Kautsky A.C.'s, as well as their only professional basketball season of play in the National Professional Basketball League (NPBL), a short-lived professional basketball league of sorts that could be seen as the precursor of both the Midwest Basketball Conference (MBC) and the National Basketball League (NBL), with the latter league eventually merging operations in 1949 with the younger, rivaling Basketball Association of America (BAA) to become the National Basketball Association (NBA). Due to this being their inaugural (professional) season of play, the Kautskys would have their home venue be held at the Indianapolis Armory instead of the present-day Hinkle Fieldhouse since they were a young, unproven franchise at the time. Entering this season, the Kautskys would join both of Akron, Ohio's works teams in the Akron Firestone Non-Skids (owned and operated by Firestone) and the Akron Goodyear Wingfoots (owned and operated by Goodyear) alongside potentially two former American Basketball League teams under rebranded names in the Fort Wayne Chiefs and the Toledo Crimson Coaches (Tobaccos) as five of the nine incoming teams to create that new league. (Interestingly, the Kautskys weren't considered a team to join this league at the time due to an initial final attempt for creating the NPBL had representatives in Fort Wayne, Indiana within their Anthony Wayne Hotel being joined by representatives in Chicago, Illinois and other Ohio locations in Akron, Canton, Cleveland, Dayton, and Toledo meeting at the time for an eight-team league before eventually deciding to be a combined Indiana-Ohio nine-team league there.) Unfortunately for the rest of the league, four of the teams created would end up folding operations throughout the season for one reason or another, with the Akron Goodyear Wingfoots playing in only six games this year. For the Kautskys, they would finish their only season in the NPBL with an above-average 7–4 record, which would be good enough for a third-place finish by being both above the Fort Wayne Chiefs and Akron Goodyear Wingfoots and behind the Toledo Crimson Coaches Tobaccos (with Toledo being only one win ahead of the Kautskys for the second place spot this season) and nearly undefeated Akron Firestone Non-Skids, but not good enough to qualify for the playoffs that season, which would actually be a best-of-five championship series between the two best teams of the league that season in the Akron Firestone Non-Skids and the Toledo Crimson Coaches Tobaccos, with the Firestone squad ultimately sweeping Toledo's team that season. This season was also notable for it being the first professional season ever played by future Hall of Famer John Wooden, who led the entire league in scoring with 126 total points scored during this season (averaging 11.5 points per game there). After a few years of independent play, team owner and head coach Frank Kautsky alongside Akron Firestone Non-Skids head coach Paul Sheeks would help create the Midwest Basketball Conference with mostly new teams being added to help succeed the original version of the NPBL that both Indianapolis and Akron had played under. Interestingly, thanks to a complex stretch of history, the Indianapolis franchise would end up being the only team from the NPBL days (and by extension, the MBC days) to end up playing for the Basketball Association of America, which soon afterward became the present-day National Basketball Association, thus giving those two minor (professional) basketball leagues a connection of sorts to the NBA.

== Roster ==
Due to information on National Professional Basketball League players being generally hard to find, there are bound to be more gaps and/or inaccuracies found in certain areas on the team's roster spots than usual.

1932–33 Indianapolis Kautskys roster
Players

Pos.	No.	Player	Height	Weight	DOB	From
F		Bill Bugg	6 ft 1 in (1.85 m)	190 lb (86 kg)	1906–10–20	Butler
G		Peedad Campbell	5 ft 7 in (1.70 m)	160 lb (73 kg)	1909–08–25	Indiana
F/C		Clarence Christopher	6 ft 7 in (2.01 m)	240 lb (109 kg)	1905–11–15	Butler
G		Bob Durham	6 ft 1 in (1.85 m)	170 lb (77 kg)	1910–10–12	Indianapolis
G		Lefty Evans	6 ft 1 in (1.85 m)	205 lb (93 kg)	1909–12–18	Butler
G		Maurice Hosier	5 ft 11 in (1.80 m)	180 lb (82 kg)	1907–08–03	Butler
G/F		Harry Kellar	5 ft 10 in (1.78 m)	170 lb (77 kg)	1906–10–01	Purdue
G		Joe Kelly	6 ft 1 in (1.85 m)	185 lb (84 kg)	1906–10–25	No college
C		Stretch Murphy	6 ft 6 in (1.98 m)	185 lb (84 kg)	1907–04–10	Purdue
G		Ray Scott	5 ft 11 in (1.80 m)	165 lb (75 kg)	1904–05–04	Franklin (IN)
G/F		John Wooden	5 ft 10 in (1.78 m)	185 lb (84 kg)	1910–10–14	Purdue

Coaches
Head coach
- Frank Kautsky

Legend
- (DP) Unsigned draft pick
- (FA) Free agent
- (S) Suspended
- Injured

== NPBL Standings ==
Pos.	Team	Wins	Losses	Win %
1	Akron Firestone Non-Skids	10	1	.909
2	Toledo Crimson Coaches Tobaccos	8	4	.667
3	Indianapolis Kautskys	7	4	.636
4	Akron Goodyear Wingfoots	2	4	.333
5	Fort Wayne Chiefs	4	9	.308
6	Kokomo Kelts†	2	3	.400
7	Muncie Whys†	1	4	.200
8	South Bend Guardsmen†	1	5	.167
9	Lorain Fisher Foods†	0	1	.000

† – Dropped out of the NPBL at various points in the season.
