= Lytle (disambiguation) =

Lytle is a surname.

Lytle may also refer to:

- Lytle, Texas
- Lytle Sandstone Formation, Colorado
- Lytle Limestone, member of Arroyo Formation, Texas
