= Red Malackany =

American basketball player

Personal information
- Born: May 3, 1913 Rankin, Pennsylvania
- Died: December 20, 1983 (aged 70) Braddock, Pennsylvania
- Listed height: 5 ft 9 in (1.75 m)
- Listed weight: 165 lb (75 kg)

Career information
- High school: Rankin (Rankin, Pennsylvania)
- College: Duquesne (1933–1936)
- Position: Guard

Career history
- 1937–1938: Warren Penns
- 1938–1939: Pittsburgh Pirates

George J. "Red" Malackany (May 3, 1913 – December 20, 1983) was an American professional basketball player. He played in college for Duquesne University. Malackany then played in the National Basketball League for the Warren Penns and Pittsburgh Pirates where he averaged 2.8 points per game in his career.

== Career statistics ==
Legend
| GP | Games played | FGM | Field goals made |
| FTM | Free throws made | FTA | Free throws attempted |
| FT% | Free throw percentage | PTS | Total points |
| PPG | Points per game | **Bold** | Career high |

=== NBL ===
==== Regular season ====
| Year | Team | GP | FGM | FTM | PTS | PPG |
|---|---|---|---|---|---|---|
| 1937–38 | Warren | **11** | **13** | **8** | **34** | **3.1** |
| 1938–39 | Pittsburgh | 4 | 3 | 2 | 8 | 2.0 |
| Career | | 15 | 16 | 10 | 42 | 2.8 |
