= Squint (disambiguation) =

A squint is the action of tightening of the muscles around the eye.

Squint may also refer to:

- Squint, a term for strabismus
- Squint (album), a 1993 album by Steve Taylor
- Squint (Julian Lage album), 2021
- Squint (antenna), an angle of transmission offset
- Squint (opening) (hagioscope), an opening through the wall of a church in an oblique direction
- Squint Entertainment, a record label
- Squint Lake, a lake in Burnaby, British Columbia, Canada
- Squint Phares (1915–1974), American basketball player
- Squint Hunter, coach for the Saint Louis Billikens men's basketball team, 1926–1927
