= Eddie Wisbar =

American basketball player

Personal information
- Born: May 3, 1916 Duquesne, Pennsylvania, U.S.
- Died: April 9, 1967 (aged 50) Duquesne, Pennsylvania, U.S.
- Listed height: 6 ft 6 in (1.98 m)
- Listed weight: 200 lb (91 kg)

Career information
- High school: Duquesne (Duquesne, Pennsylvania)
- Playing career: 1935–1941
- Position: Center

Career history
- 1935–1936: Detroit Hed-Aids
- 1936–1937: Detroit Altes Lager
- 1937–1938: Pittsburgh Pirates
- 1940–1941: Duquesne Koprivers

Edward Joseph Wisbar (May 3, 1916 – April 9, 1967) was an American professional basketball player. He played in the National Basketball League for the Pittsburgh Pirates during the 1937–38 season and averaged 5.8 points per game. Wisbar also played semi-professional basketball for a number of teams.

== Career statistics ==
Legend
GP	Games played	FGM	Field goals made
FTM	Free throws made	FTA	Free throws attempted
FT%	Free throw percentage	PTS	Total points
PPG	Points per game	**Bold**	Career high

=== NBL ===
==== Regular season ====
Year	Team	GP	FGM	FTM	PTS	PPG
1937–38	Pittsburgh	13	27	22	76	5.8
