= Joseph Kinney =

Joseph Kinney may refer to:

- Joe Kinney (baseball), American college baseball coach and player
- Joe Kinney (basketball) (1912–1975), American basketball player
- Joe Kinney (strongman), American grip strength specialist
- Joseph Robbins Kinney (1839–1919), merchant, notary public and political figure in Nova Scotia, Canada
- Joseph Kinney Jr. (1799–1875), American farmer and politician
