= Harlan Wilson =

Harlan Wilson may refer to:

- Harlan Wilson (basketball) (1914–1988), American professional basketball player
- D. Harlan Wilson (born 1971), American novelist, short-story writer, critic, playwright and English professor
