= Tim Lawry =

American basketball player

Personal information
- Born: August 1, 1911 Pittsburgh, Pennsylvania
- Died: September 19, 1999 (aged 88) Cleveland, Ohio
- Listed height: 5 ft 10 in (1.78 m)
- Listed weight: 155 lb (70 kg)

Career information
- High school: Allegheny (Pittsburgh, Pennsylvania)
- College: Pittsburgh (1929–1932)
- Position: Forward

Career history
- 1937–1938: Pittsburgh Pirates

Thomas J. "Tim" Lawry Sr. (August 1, 1911 – September 19, 1999) was an American professional basketball player. He played college basketball for the University of Pittsburgh. Lawry then played in the National Basketball League for the Pittsburgh Pirates during the 1937–38 season and averaged 2.9 points per game. He also played semi-professional baseball for the Johnstown Johnnies and Zanesville Greys.
