= Elkins High School (West Virginia) =

Coordinates: 38°53′29.90″N 79°51′6.20″W

Location
- 100 Kennedy Drive; Elkins, Randolph County, West Virginia 26241; United States

Information
- School type: Public, high school
- Established: 1894
- School district: Randolph County Schools
- CEEB code: 490360
- Principal: Carla Lambert
- Staff: 42.50 (FTE)
- Grades: 9–12
- Enrollment: 747 (2024–2025)
- Student to teacher ratio: 17.58
- Campus type: Suburban
- Color: Orange Black
- Athletics conference: Big Ten Conference
- Mascot: Tigers
- Nickname: Home of the Tigers
- Rival: Buckhannon-Upshur High School
- Alumni: Marshall Goldberg, John Ochsendorf
- Website: Elkins High School Official Page

Elkins High School (EHS) is a public high school located in Elkins, West Virginia, United States. The school serves students ranging from grades 9 through 12. The school has an enrollment of 933 students as of September, 2009. This makes it the 30th largest school by enrollment in the state, and the second largest (Behind Buckhannon-Upshur High School) within 70 miles (110 km).

== History ==
The current building was constructed at a cost of $12.7 million by the site of the existing Randolph Vocational Technical Center, Midland Elementary School and adjacent to the Elkins-Randolph County Regional Airport. The architect, SEM Partners, created a two story building of over 160,000 square feet (15,000 m^{2}). The new building was the result of a school consolidation effort in West Virginia. Coalton High School was closed and students from Coalton, WV were bused to Elkins, WV to attend the new high school. In an effort to acknowledge the merger of the two high schools, the school board voted prior to the 1993-1994 school to name the new school Forest Hills High School. Prior to the name change announcement, ballots were distributed to the students and staff which did not include the name Elkins High as an option. A majority of students wrote on the ballots Elkins High School as a name choice. Several students declared they observed teachers throw away ballots that had the written name choice of Elkins High. After the name decision was announced the students and parents were in an uproar over the change. Parents, students, and teachers held town meetings and student walkouts in objection to the name change. The new high school, under the name Forrest Hills, opened during the Fall of 1993 and held commencement exercises during June 1994 for what would become the only graduating class of Forest Hills High School. Following the 1993-1994 school year, several new school board members were elected to the Randolph County Board of Education with support from the Elkins High School Alumni Association. During the summer of 1994, these new board members voted to change the name of the school back to Elkins High School. The school reopened for the 1994-1995 school year as Elkins High School.

== Academics ==
The teachers and administration at EHS promote and reward students for academics and attendance. EHS offers both basic courses and a variety of Advanced Placement courses and Dual Credit courses. Students who attend EHS also have the opportunity to take Vocational classes at the connected Randolph Technical Center (RTC) and College courses. Although not offered every year, EHS, along with the RTC offers 132 courses, six of which are Advanced Placement courses (Music, English Literature and Language, Calculus AB, US History and Government and Politics).

As of 2009, the graduation rate is 77.7%. The average for all West Virginia high schools is 77.0%. For 2009 the graduation rate for the U.S. is 75.5%.

== Interscholastic athletics ==
Athletics are also a big part of the student life at EHS. The school is classified AA, the 2nd highest classification, by the West Virginia Secondary School Activities Commission. EHS fields 19 separate teams in every officially sanctioned WVSSAC sport.

The school competed in the NCAC (North Central Athletic Conference) from 1986 until the 2009-2010 school year. It returned to the Big Ten Conference starting in the 2010-2011 school year. It offers baseball, boys' and girls' basketball, cheerleading, boys' and girls' cross country, football, golf, boys' and girls' soccer, softball, boys' and girls' swimming, boys' and girls' tennis, boys' and girls' track, girls' volleyball and wrestling.

=== Venues ===
Baseball, basketball, cheerleading, track, volleyball and wrestling hold their home contests on the EHS campus. The football team practices and plays their games at the historic Wimer Field, located at the former campus of Elkins High School in South Elkins. The cross country, swimming and tennis teams hold their home contests on the campus of Davis and Elkins College. The soccer team practices and currently plays at EHS. Previously, the soccer teams played their matches at Riverbend Park in south Elkins. Riverbend's field was one of the first soccer-specific fields in the state to be fitted with lights. The golf team hosts its home matches at Elk's Golf Course, located three miles (5 km) south of EHS. The softball team plays in renovated fields behind the Elkins Middle School. All girls' teams are known as the Lady Tigers.

=== State champions and runners-up ===
Elkins High School athletes hold individual and team state titles in numerous sports. The following are the team titles provided by the WVSSAC

==== State champions ====
- Boys' Basketball (1914, 1926, 1935)
- Boys' Cross Country (1978, 1979, 2024, 2025)
- Girls' Cross Country (1986, 2001)
- Football (1928)
- Girls' Soccer (2005)
- Girls' Swimming (2024)

==== State runners up ====
- Baseball (1990)
- Boys' Basketball (1934, 1936, 1950)
- Girls' Basketball (1982)
- Boys' Cross Country (1980, 1981)
- Girls' Cross Country (1985, 1998, 2002)
- Girls' Soccer (2004)

== Notable alumni ==
- Marshall Goldberg (1917–2006), NFL All-Pro football player
- John Ochsendorf, MIT professor
- Squint Phares, professional basketball player
- Stan Fansler, professional baseball pitcher
