= Earl Thomas (basketball) =

American basketball player

Personal information
- Born: September 22, 1915 Ashland, Ohio, U.S.
- Died: October 7, 1989 (aged 74) Elyria, Ohio, U.S.
- Listed height: 6 ft 4 in (1.93 m)
- Listed weight: 205 lb (93 kg)

Career information
- High school: Ashland (Ashland, Ohio)
- College: Ohio State (1934–1937)
- Position: Center

Career history
- 1937: Cincinnati Comellos
- 1938: Indianapolis Kautskys

Career highlights
- All-Big Ten (1936)

Earl Hubert Thomas (September 22, 1915 – October 7, 1989) was an American professional basketball player. He played in the National Basketball League for the Cincinnati Comellos in 1937–38, then for the Indianapolis Kautskys in 1938–39. In nine career games he averaged 1.0 point per game. In his post-basketball life Thomas worked as a regional sales manager for a publishing company.
