= Lytle =

Lytle is a surname that can refer to:

- Andrew Nelson Lytle (1902–1995), American writer
- Bob Lytle (1916–1998), American basketball player
- Chris Lytle, American martial arts fighter
- Donald Lytle (1938–2003), stage name of Johnny Paycheck, American singer-songwriter
- Jason Lytle, American musician
- Johnny Lytle, American boxer, musician
- Lutie Lytle, American lawyer
- Marshall Lytle, American musician
- Rob Lytle, American football player
- Robert Todd Lytle, American politician
- William Haines Lytle, American general, politician, and poet
