= 1935–36 Chicago Duffy Florals season =

MBC professional basketball team champion season

- League champions
- League: Midwest Basketball Conference
- Head coach: Tom Brice
- Arena: White City Stadium

Results
- Record: 3–2 (.600)
- Place: Division: 2nd* (Western)
- Playoff finish: Won MBC Championship (Defeated Kautskys 39–35)

The 1935–36 Chicago Duffy Florals season was the inaugural season played by the Chicago Duffy Florals, a team owned and operated by a floral concern of sorts that joined the Midwest Basketball Conference (MBC) as a late, ninth team entry into its inaugural season of existence before it eventually rebranded itself into the United States' National Basketball League (NBL) by the 1937–38 season. However, if one were to include their independent seasons of play before joining the MBC late into this season alongside their only season of play in the Midwest Professional Basketball League, this would end up becoming the Duffy Florals' sixth season of play instead. Regardless of that information, their late inclusion entering this season would mean that the inaugural season of the MBC would see five teams competing in the Western Division (including the Duffy Florals) and four teams in the Eastern Division instead of the originally planned four teams in each division that was had at the time. Due to them being a late entry into the MBC, the Duffy Florals could only feasibly play a small amount of games in that conference this season, which would turn out to be five total regular season games for this season. Despite the minuscule number of games played due to their (likely) late addition into the season (which would at least partially occur due to the blue laws in the United States being very significant at the time since the MBC had no set schedules in mind for their teams), the Duffy Florals would end up seeing some serious controversy in their first season that would go all the way into the conclusion of this season.

Originally, the Midwest Basketball Conference had the set requirement of needing its teams to have a bare minimum of only twelve games being played in order for a team to qualify for the inaugural MBC playoffs, which was originally planned to be a "double-knockout" system where each of the four teams would host the respective playoff matches in mind for the month of March in 1936. However, due to a combination of the Duffy Florals having a better overall win percentage than the Detroit Hed-Aids (with Chicago's 3–2 record barely beating out Detroit's 9–7 record this season), Chicago beating Detroit in a decisive manner in the only scheduled match they had played against each other within the MBC, and the Detroit Hed-Aids franchise facing potential financial issues at the time (at least according to Rochester Seagrams team owner Les Harrison), the Chicago Duffy Florals would end up taking the runner-up spot in the Western Division over the Detroit Hed-Aids. Not only that, but the originally planned "double-knockout" system that was planned to play out in Indianapolis, Chicago, Pittsburgh, and Akron to represent the Indianapolis Kautskys, Chicago Duffy Florals, Pittsburgh Y.M.H.A., and Akron Firestone Non-Skids respectively ultimately had to be converted into a round robin tournament format where every match in the tournament was played in the Chicago's White City Stadium on March 22, 1936, instead due to the four teams finding out that not everyone would have their respective venues available for their planned dates in the original tournament format the MBC had. In any case, despite the Duffy Florals being seen as the odd team out in the round robin tournament due to their small record, they would not only surprise and upset the planned favorites in the Akron Firestone Non-Skids through a close 33–30 victory, but also surprise and upset the Western Division champion Indianapolis Kautskys through a 39–35 victory to take the first ever league championship through what can be seen as controversial means. However, if one were to include the Midwest Basketball Championship as a part of the National Basketball League's history, then the Duffy Florals can be seen as the league's first ever champions before eventually being merged into the National Basketball Association in 1949. Following the conclusion of their second and final season in the MBC, the Duffy Florals would leave the MBC/NBL to become an independent team once again, with them lasting as a franchise up until 1940 for (likely) financial reasons.

== Roster ==
Due to information on Midwest Basketball Conference players being generally hard to find, there are bound to be more gaps and/or inaccuracies found in certain areas on the team's roster spots than usual.

1935–36 Chicago Duffy Florals roster
Players

| Pos. | No. | Player | Height | Weight | DOB | From |
|---|---|---|---|---|---|---|
| G/F | | Frank Froschauer | 6 ft 4 in (1.93 m) | 185 lb (84 kg) | 1920–05–11 | Illinois |
| G/F | | Johnny Ivers | 6 ft 3 in (1.91 m) | 200 lb (91 kg) | 1918–08–02 | American |
| F/C | | John Jordan | 6 ft 6 in (1.98 m) | 250 lb (113 kg) | 1920–12–29 | Notre Dame |
| F/C | | Eddie Kolar | 6 ft 1 in (1.85 m) | 170 lb (77 kg) | 1918–08–30 | Morton HS (IL) |
| G | | Otto Kolar | 5 ft 11 in (1.80 m) | 180 lb (82 kg) | 1914–01–07 | Morton HS (IL) |
| G/F | | Harry Lucas | 6 ft 3 in (1.91 m) | 190 lb (86 kg) | 1916–11–05 | Englewood HS (IL) |
| C | | Vince McGowan | 6 ft 10 in (2.08 m) | 245 lb (111 kg) | 1924–06–18 | DePaul |
| F/C | | Hal Motz | 6 ft 2 in (1.88 m) | 195 lb (88 kg) | 1925–03–13 | Loyola Chicago |
| F/C | | Joe Reiff | 6 ft 0 in (1.83 m) | 180 lb (82 kg) | 1924–11–29 | Northwestern |
| G/F | | Willis Young | 6 ft 2 in (1.88 m) | 185 lb (84 kg) | 1922–05–05 | Delphi HS (IN) |

Coaches
Head coach
- Tom Brice

Legend
- (DP) Unsigned draft pick
- (FA) Free agent
- (S) Suspended
- Injured

Note: Frank Froschauer, Vince McGowan, and Hal Motz would (presumably) not take part in either one of the two games Chicago played while competing in the round-robin tournament that represented the playoffs for this season.

== MBC Standings ==
=== Eastern Division ===
| Pos. | Eastern Division | Wins | Losses | Win % |
|---|---|---|---|---|
| 1 | Akron Firestone Non-Skids | 11 | 7 | .611 |
| 2 | Pittsburgh Y.M.H.A. | 10 | 7 | .588 |
| 3 | Buffalo Bisons | 7 | 8 | .467 |
| 4 | Dayton Metropolitans | 4 | 6 | .400 |

=== Western Division ===
| Pos. | Western Division | Wins | Losses | Win % |
|---|---|---|---|---|
| 1 | Indianapolis Kautskys | 9 | 3 | .750 |
| 2 | Chicago Duffy Florals‡ | 3 | 2 | .600 |
| 3 | Detroit Hed-Aids‡ | 9 | 7 | .563 |
| 4 | Indianapolis U.S. Tires | 5 | 9 | .357 |
| 5 | Windsor Cooper Buses | 2 | 11 | .154 |
^{‡} Chicago would gain the final playoff spot over Detroit despite not meeting the required minimum of 12 games played.

== MBC Round-Robin Tournament ==
All of the Midwest Basketball Conference's round-robin tournament matches would occur on March 22, 1936, at the White City Stadium in Chicago, Illinois.

- Semifinal Round: (2W) Chicago Duffy Florals Vs. (1E) Akron Firestone Non-Skids: Chicago Duffy Florals defeated the Akron Firestone Non-Skids 33–30.
- Championship Round: (2W) Chicago Duffy Florals Vs. (1W) Indianapolis Kautskys: Chicago Duffy Florals defeated the Indianapolis Kautskys 39–35.

The Chicago Duffy Florals would win the 1936 MBC Round-Robin Tournament over the Pittsburgh Y.M.H.A., Akron Firestone Non-Skids, and the Indianapolis Kautskys franchises.
