= Ted Rigg =

American basketball player

Personal information
- Born: June 7, 1913 Pittsburgh, Pennsylvania, U.S.
- Died: January 1, 2002 (aged 88) Baltimore, Maryland, U.S.
- Listed height: 6 ft 0 in (1.83 m)
- Listed weight: 175 lb (79 kg)

Career information
- College: Carnegie Mellon (1933–1935)
- Position: Guard

Career history
- 1937–1938: Pittsburgh Pirates

Edward G. Rigg (June 7, 1913 – January 1, 2002) was an American professional basketball player. He played college basketball for Carnegie Mellon University. Rigg then played in the National Basketball League for the Pittsburgh Pirates during the 1937–38 season and averaged 4.3 points per game.
