= Harlan Wilson (basketball) =

American basketball player (1914–1988)

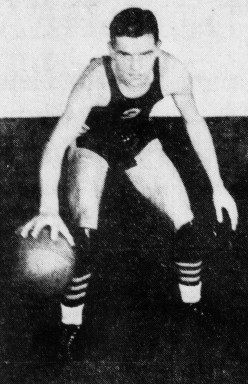
- Wilson, circa 1937

Personal information
- Born: February 3, 1914 Adams, Indiana, U.S.
- Died: August 3, 1988 (aged 74) Lafayette, Indiana, U.S.
- Listed height: 5 ft 11 in (1.80 m)
- Listed weight: 160 lb (73 kg)

Career information
- High school: Morgantown (Morgantown, Indiana)
- College: Canterbury (1933–1936)
- Playing career: 1935–1938
- Position: Guard

Career history
- 1935–1936: Indianapolis Kautskys
- 1936–1937: Indianapolis U.S. Tires
- 1937–1938: Indianapolis Kautskys
- 1937–1938: Hilgemeier Packers

Harlan Edward Wilson (February 3, 1914 – August 3, 1988) was an American professional basketball player. He played for the Indianapolis Kautskys in the National Basketball League and averaged 6.5 points per game.

== Career statistics ==
Legend
GP	Games played	FGM	Field goals made
FTM	Free throws made	FTA	Free throws attempted
FT%	Free throw percentage	PTS	Total points
PPG	Points per game	**Bold**	Career high

=== NBL ===
==== Regular season ====
Year	Team	GP	FGM	FTM	PTS	PPG
1937–38	Indianapolis	11	24	24	72	6.5
