= Beanie Berens =

American basketball player (1913–1979)

Personal information
- Born: February 26, 1913 Lancaster, Ohio, U.S.
- Died: May 29, 1979 (aged 66) Albuquerque, New Mexico, U.S.
- Listed height: 6 ft 5 in (1.96 m)
- Listed weight: 190 lb (86 kg)

Career information
- High school: St. Mary's (Lancaster, Ohio)
- College: Ohio (1932–1935)
- Position: Center

Career history

Playing
- 1935–1936: Akron Firestones
- 1936–1937: Akron Firestone Non-Skids
- 1937–1938: Columbus All-Stars
- 1938–1940: Columbus Athletic Supply
- 1939–1940: Bradley Clothing Company

Coaching
- 1938–1951: St. Mary's HS

Bernard William "Beanie" Berens Jr. (February 26, 1913 – May 29, 1979) was an American professional basketball player. He played for Columbus Athletic Supply in the National Basketball League, among other teams in various leagues. Afterward, he was a high school teacher and basketball coach in his hometown of Lancaster, Ohio.

== Career statistics ==
Legend
GP	Games played	FGM	Field goals made
FTM	Free throws made	FTA	Free throws attempted
FT%	Free throw percentage	PTS	Total points
PPG	Points per game	**Bold**	Career high

=== NBL ===
==== Regular season ====
Year	Team	GP	FGM	FTM	PTS	PPG
1937–38	Columbus	1	0	1	1	1.0
