= Joe Kinney (basketball) =

American basketball player

Personal information
- Born: March 12, 1910
- Died: March 12, 1975 (aged 65)
- Listed height: 6 ft 6 in (1.98 m)

Career information
- College: West Virginia Wesleyan
- Position: Center

Career history
- 1938: Pittsburgh Pirates

Joseph H. Kinney (March 12, 1910 – March 12, 1975) was an American professional basketball player. He played in the National Basketball League for the Pittsburgh Pirates during the 1938–39 season and averaged 1.5 points per game in two career games played.
