= Squint Phares =

American basketball player (1915–1974)

Personal information
- Born: December 31, 1915 Elkins, West Virginia, U.S.
- Died: August 16, 1974 (aged 58) Columbus, Ohio, U.S.
- Listed height: 5 ft 10 in (1.78 m)
- Listed weight: 175 lb (79 kg)

Career information
- High school: Elkins (Elkins, West Virginia)
- College: West Virginia (1935–1938)
- Position: Shooting guard / small forward

Career history
- 1938–1939: Pittsburgh Pirates

John Lee "Squint" Phares (December 31, 1915 – August 16, 1974) was an American professional basketball player. He played college basketball, baseball, and football for West Virginia University. Phares then played in the National Basketball League for the Pittsburgh Pirates during the 1938–39 season and averaged 6.9 points per game.

In his post-basketball life, he and his wife ran a nursery school in Columbus, Ohio.
