= Cy Proffitt =

American basketball player

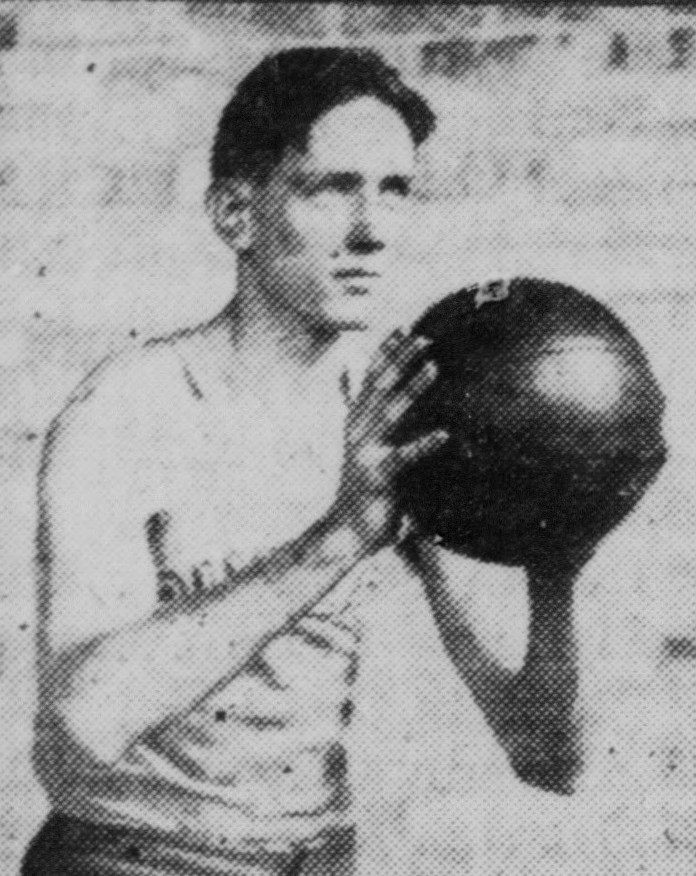
- Proffitt, circa 1935

Personal information
- Born: October 26, 1911 Lebanon, Indiana, U.S.
- Died: February 13, 1996 (aged 84) Danville, Indiana, U.S.
- Listed height: 6 ft 3 in (1.91 m)
- Listed weight: 190 lb (86 kg)

Career information
- High school: Lebanon (Lebanon, Indiana)
- College: Butler (1930–1933)
- Position: Forward

Career history

Playing
- 1935–1938: Indianapolis Kautskys
- 1937–1938: Hilgemeier Packers

Coaching
- 1937–1938: Hilgemeier Packers

Career highlights
- Second-team All-MVC (1933)

Searle Truman "Cy" Proffitt (October 26, 1911 – February 13, 1996) was an American professional basketball player. He played for the Indianapolis Kautskys in the National Basketball League and averaged 4.3 points per game.
