= Irv Brenner =

American basketball player

Personal information
- Born: May 31, 1913 Pittsburgh, Pennsylvania
- Died: January 20, 1991 (aged 77) North Miami Beach, Florida
- Listed height: 6 ft 4 in (1.93 m)
- Listed weight: 200 lb (91 kg)

Career information
- High school: Fifth Avenue (Pittsburgh, Pennsylvania)
- College: Duquesne (1931–1934)
- Position: Forward / center

Career history
- 1944–1945: Pittsburgh Raiders
- 1945–1946: Youngstown Bears

Career highlights
- Duquesne Hall of Fame (1983)

Irving C. Brenner (May 31, 1913 – January 20, 1991) was an American professional basketball player. Brenner played in the National Basketball League for the Pittsburgh Raiders in 1944–45, then for the Youngstown Bears in 1945–46 and one game of 1946–47. He averaged 3.6 points per game for his career.
