= Howard Stammler =

American basketball player

Personal information
- Born: July 23, 1911 Ohio, U.S.
- Died: June 6, 1977 (aged 65) Columbus, Ohio, U.S.
- Listed height: 5 ft 10 in (1.78 m)
- Listed weight: 155 lb (70 kg)

Career information
- College: Ohio Wesleyan (1932–1935)
- Position: Shooting guard / small forward

Career history
- 1936–1937: Columbus Athletic Supply (MBC)
- 1937: Dayton Metropolitans

Howard Stammler (July 23, 1911 – June 6, 1977) was an American professional basketball player. He played in the National Basketball League for the Dayton Metropolitans in four games during the 1937–38 season and averaged 5.0 points per game.
