= Jack Stirling =

American basketball player

Personal information
- Born: November 16, 1917 Pennsylvania, U.S.
- Died: September 1970 (aged 52–53) Beaver, Pennsylvania, U.S.
- Listed height: 6 ft 5 in (1.96 m)

Career information
- College: Geneva (1936–1938)
- Position: Center

Career history
- 1937–1938: Warren Penns
- 1938–1939: Pittsburgh Pirates

Jack B. Stirling, sometimes misspelled at "Sterling" (November 16, 1917 – September 1970) was an American professional basketball player. He played college basketball for Geneva College. He then played in the National Basketball League for the Warren Penns and Pittsburgh Pirates. Stirling averaged 2.2 points per game in his career.

== Career statistics ==
Legend
GP	Games played	FGM	Field goals made
FTM	Free throws made	FTA	Free throws attempted
FT%	Free throw percentage	PTS	Total points
PPG	Points per game	**Bold**	Career high

=== NBL ===
==== Regular season ====
Year	Team	GP	FGM	FTM	PTS	PPG
1937–38	Warren	6	**13**	**10**	**36**	**6.0**
1938–39	Pittsburgh	**12**	1	1	3	.3
Career		18	14	11	39	2.2
