= Emmett Morrison =

American basketball player

Personal information
- Born: August 24, 1915 Rossiter, Pennsylvania, U.S.
- Died: February 2, 1993 (aged 77) Georgetown, California, U.S.
- Listed height: 6 ft 3 in (1.91 m)
- Listed weight: 180 lb (82 kg)

Career information
- High school: Brookville (Brookville, Pennsylvania)
- College: Pittsburgh (1936–1937)
- Playing career: 1937–1940
- Position: Small forward / shooting guard

Career history
- 1934–1935: Brookville Firemen Independents
- 1937–1938: Warren Marconi Club
- 1938: Warren Penns
- 1939–1940: Warren National Forge
- 1939–1940: Oil City CPT

Emmett Woodrow Morrison (August 24, 1915 – February 2, 1993) was an American professional basketball player. He played in the National Basketball League for the Warren Penns during the 1937–38 season and averaged 1.7 points per game. He left the University of Pittsburgh after his sophomore season to focus on his professional basketball career.
