= Herbie Hutchisson =

American basketball player

Personal information
- Born: April 19, 1915 Springfield, Ohio
- Died: August 14, 1968 (aged 53) Fort Wayne, Indiana
- Listed height: 5 ft 10 in (1.78 m)
- Listed weight: 145 lb (66 kg)

Career information
- High school: Ostrander (Ostrander, Ohio)
- College: Otterbein (1932–1933)
- Position: Guard / forward

Career history
- 1935–1936: Dayton Metropolitans
- 1936–1938: Columbus Athletic Supply
- 1936–1937: Coshocton Buckeye Clothiers

Herbert Augustus Hutchisson (April 19, 1915 – August 14, 1968; last name often misspelled Hutchison) was an American professional basketball player. He played in the National Basketball League for the Columbus Athletic Supply and averaged 8.0 points per game. He also competed for other teams in semi-professional leagues.

== Career statistics ==
Legend
GP	Games played	FGM	Field goals made
FTM	Free throws made	FTA	Free throws attempted
FT%	Free throw percentage	PTS	Total points
PPG	Points per game	**Bold**	Career high

=== NBL ===
==== Regular season ====
Year	Team	GP	FGM	FTM	FTA	FT%	PTS	PPG
1937–38	Columbus	7	25	6			56	8.0
1948–49	Denver	**59**	**106**	**53**	78	.679	**265**	4.5
Career		66	131	59	78	.679	321	4.9
