= Bill Jesko =

American basketball player (1915–1961)

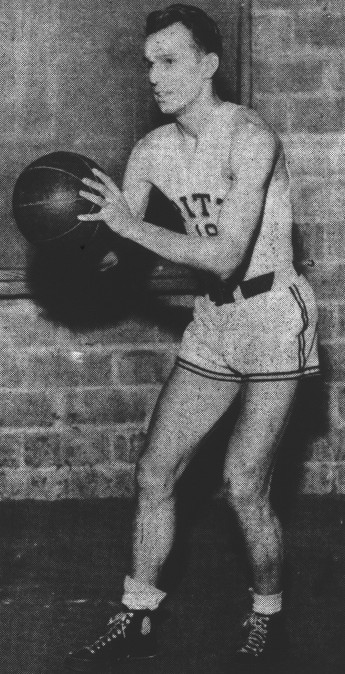
- Jesko, circa 1936

Personal information
- Born: December 24, 1915 Pennsylvania, US
- Died: October 21, 1961 (aged 45) Whitehall, Pennsylvania, US
- Listed height: 5 ft 10 in (1.78 m)
- Listed weight: 170 lb (77 kg)

Career information
- High school: South (Pittsburgh, Pennsylvania)
- College: Pittsburgh (1935–1937)
- Position: Guard / forward

Career history

Playing
- 1937–1939: Pittsburgh Pirates

Coaching
- 1938–1939: Fayette City HS
- 1939–1941, 1945–1946: Marion HS
- 1946–1961: Baldwin HS

William Joseph Jesko (December 24, 1915 – October 21, 1961) was an American professional basketball player. He played college basketball for the University of Pittsburgh where he was the team captain in his senior year in 1936–37. Jesko then played in the National Basketball League for two years for the Pittsburgh Pirates and averaged 5.7 points per game. He served in World War II, then coached high school basketball until 1961, when he unexpectedly died in his home.

== Career statistics ==
Legend
GP	Games played	FGM	Field goals made
FTM	Free throws made	FTA	Free throws attempted
FT%	Free throw percentage	PTS	Total points
PPG	Points per game	**Bold**	Career high

=== NBL ===
==== Regular season ====
Year	Team	GP	FGM	FTM	PTS	PPG
1937–38	Pittsburgh	10	14	14	42	4.2
1938–39	Pittsburgh	**24**	**66**	**19**	**151**	**6.3**
Career		34	80	33	193	5.7
