= Jim Strickland =

Jim Strickland or James Strickland may refer to:

- Jim Strickland (baseball) (born 1946), American baseball player
- Jim Strickland (politician) (born 1963), mayor of Memphis, Tennessee
- James Fordyce Strickland, Canadian politician
