= Reno Strand =

American basketball player

Personal information
- Born: May 14, 1909 Erie, Pennsylvania, U.S.
- Died: June 27, 1988 (aged 79) Erie, Pennsylvania, U.S.
- Listed height: 6 ft 0 in (1.83 m)
- Listed weight: 195 lb (88 kg)

Career information
- Playing career: 1931–1953
- Position: Guard / forward

Career history

Playing
- 1931–1932: House of David
- 1932–1933: Warren Transits
- 1933–1934: Union City Ritz Pennsylvanians
- 1934–1935: Erie General Electrics
- 1934–1937: Warren Hyvis Oils
- 1937–1939: Warren Penns
- 1939: Cleveland White Horses
- 1946–1947: Corry Vets
- 1952–1953: National Transits

Coaching
- 1942–1944: Strong Vincent HS

Reno O. Strand (May 14, 1909 – June 27, 1988) was an American professional basketball player. He played for the Cleveland White Horses in the National Basketball League during the 1938–39 season and averaged 2.8 points per game.
