= Stretch Murphy =

American basketball player (1907–1992)

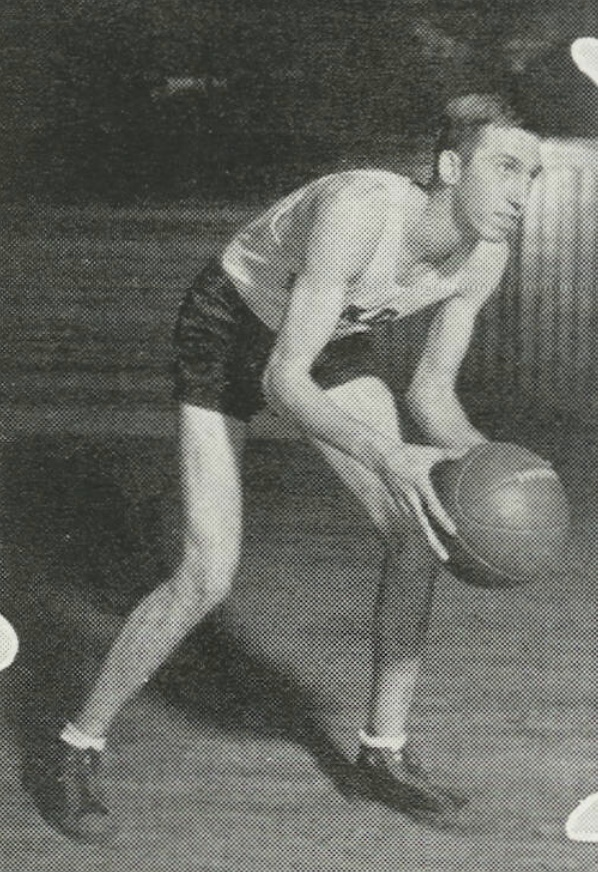

Personal information
- Born: April 10, 1907 Marion, Indiana, U.S.
- Died: August 17, 1992 (aged 85) Tampa, Florida, U.S.
- Listed height: 6 ft 6 in (1.98 m)
- Listed weight: 185 lb (84 kg)

Career information
- High school: Marion (Marion, Indiana)
- College: Purdue (1927–1930)
- Playing career: 1930–1934
- Position: Center

Career history
- 1930: Chicago Bruins
- 1932–1934: Indianapolis Kautskys

Career highlights
- 3× Consensus All-American (1928–1930); 3× First-team All-Big Ten (1928–1930)
- Basketball Hall of Fame
- Collegiate Basketball Hall of Fame

Charles Carroll "Stretch" Murphy (April 10, 1907 – August 17, 1992) was an American basketball player.

He played competitive basketball at Marion High School (1922–26), located in Marion, Indiana. The All-State player led his school to the Indiana state championship in 1926 during his senior year. He was recruited by men's head coach, Ward Lambert, at Purdue University, where he played for three varsity seasons (from 1927 to 1930). Scoring 137 points (11.4 ppg), he teamed with fellow Hall of Famer John Wooden and co-captain Glen Harmeson, to lead the Boilers to the Big 10 championship in 1930 after an undefeated season in conference play (10–0). He set a new Big 10 scoring record for a season in 1929 with 143 points (11.9 ppg) and led Purdue to a 53–13 overall record during his tenure. Murphy was named a Consensus All-American in both his junior and senior years and to the All-time All-American team. After graduating from Purdue, Murphy played for the American Basketball League's Chicago Bruins and the independent Indianapolis Kautskys.

Murphy was one of the game's first true big men. At 6 ft 6 in (1.98 m), he was an insurmountable force on both ends of the court. He was inducted into the Basketball Hall of Fame in 1960 and the Indiana Basketball Hall of Fame in 1963.

Murphy died on August 17, 1992, at age 85.
