= 1935–36 Buffalo Bisons season =

MBC professional basketball team season

- League: Midwest Basketball Conference
- Head coach: Sam Siegel & Elky Maister
- General manager: Alfred Heerdt
- Owner(s): Alfred Heerdt
- Arena: Broadway Auditorium; Elmwood Music Hall

Results
- Record: 7–8 (.467)
- Place: Division: 3rd (Eastern)
- Playoff finish: Did not qualify

The 1935–36 Buffalo Bisons season was the first and only professional basketball season of play (though the MBC would be seen as either an amateur or semi-pro basketball league by most basketball historians) for the original Buffalo Bisons NBL team in the city of Buffalo, New York under the Midwest Basketball Conference name, which officially was the first season that it existed as a league before it later rebranded itself into the National Basketball League as a professional basketball league by the 1937–38 season. However, if you include the season before this one where they played in the New York State Basketball League (though by sometimes using the Buffalo Lincolns name in the process there) alongside the multiple independent seasons they had as a team (including potential seasons where they used the Buffalo Drydocks name instead) and potentially one season where they even played in the original American Basketball League back when it was first created (sometimes even being referred to as the Buffalo Germans there), this would officially be considered at least their tenth season of existence (or at the very least, their sixth season of existence) as a team. However, it has been considered possible that the original Buffalo Bisons team starting from the original ABL days actually first began as the original Buffalo Germans barnstorming team from 1895 (four years after the invention of the sport of basketball itself by James Naismith) before "disbanding" around the same time the Buffalo Bisons first existed instead, meaning their actual team history alongside an apparent team merger with another Buffalo basketball franchise would actually make this either their 40th or 36th season of play instead (depending on whether one would count seasons after their only ABL season before their first known independent season as the Bisons as official seasons or not). Despite this team later having the same name as the team that would briefly appear once again in the succeeding NBL by 1946, the team that eventually became the present-day Atlanta Hawks of the NBA would not have the same history as this Buffalo Bisons team under this season of play. In any case, due to the more loose structure in the MBC at the time, each division originally had four teams each before it later ended up adding a ninth team late into the season to have four teams in the Eastern Division (Buffalo's division) and five teams in the Western Division with the late addition of the Chicago Duffy Florals.

This season was notable for having the first African American player to ever play in a very notable, integrated (professional) basketball league, as Hank Williams would compete with the Bisons during this season only, being their highest scoring player along the way there with 83 overall points scored this season (as well as the third African American player to ever play in a professional basketball league at the time behind Harry "Bucky" Lew from the New England Basketball League over 30 years ago and Howard Ross from the Central Basketball League from nearly a decade ago beforehand; tragically, Williams would pass away on December 1, 1938 due to a year-long battle with an illness he was dealing with at the time). Interestingly, The Bisons were also the only team to utilize two different head coaches at the same time for their team throughout the entire season instead of just one head coach for some odd reason (which could be seen as a precursor to the modern-day coaching format of a head coach and an assistant coach that professional teams usually have by comparison to what was being utilized at the time). Unfortunately for Buffalo, they would end up finishing their season with a third place finish in the Eastern Division due to their below-average 7–8 record placing them behind the Pittsburgh Y.M.H.A. team and the Akron Firestone Non-Skids works team. Because of that fact, Buffalo would fail to qualify for the inaugural MBC round-robin tournament that represented what would later be considered as the playoffs for the newly-constructed league during this season. Following this season's conclusion, the Buffalo Bisons would join the Canadian-based Windsor Cooper Buses as the only other team to leave the MBC for its second season of operations, with the Bisons opting to become an independent team once again while the Windsor Cooper Buses' final fate as a team ultimately remains unknown to this day (with a few other teams rebranding themselves for their second season in the MBC instead). However, unlike the Canadian-based Windsor Cooper Buses team (and a couple other teams within the MBC during their two seasons of existence under that name), the Buffalo Bisons would end up returning to the league in 1937 just in time for it to rebrand from the Midwest Basketball Conference to the National Basketball League in order to begin what would officially be dubbed as the 1937–38 NBL season.

== Roster ==
Due to information on Midwest Basketball Conference players being generally hard to find, there are bound to be more gaps and/or inaccuracies found in certain areas on the team's roster spots than usual.

Player	Position
Tommy Allen	C
Jim Brown	G-F
Sibby Cortelli	G
Lou Fink	G-F
Joe Gallagher	F
Bobby Harrington	G
Manny Hirsch	G
Irwin "King Kong" Klein	F
Elky Maister	G
Frank Maury	G
Morey Pearson	G
Red Renner	G
Johnny Rybak	G-F
Sam Siegel	F
Bello Snyder	G-F
Walt Stanky	F-C
Eddie Taylor	F
Hank Williams	C

Note: Hank Williams would retroactively be considered one of the first modern African Americans to ever play professional basketball during this season of play. Not only that, but forward Irwin "King Kong" Klein would also end up being a movie star himself, with him being best known for appearing as himself in a 1936 film called "The Big Game".

== MBC Standings ==
=== Eastern Division ===
Pos.	Eastern Division	Wins	Losses	Win %
1	Akron Firestone Non-Skids	11	7	.611
2	Pittsburgh Y.M.H.A.	10	7	.588
3	Buffalo Bisons	7	8	.467
4	Dayton Metropolitans	4	6	.400

=== Western Division ===
Pos.	Western Division	Wins	Losses	Win %
1	Indianapolis Kautskys	9	3	.750
2	Chicago Duffy Florals‡	3	2	.600
3	Detroit Hed-Aids‡	9	7	.563
4	Indianapolis U.S. Tires	5	9	.357
5	Windsor Cooper Buses	2	11	.154
^{‡} Chicago would gain the final playoff spot over Detroit despite not meeting the required minimum of 12 games played.
