= George Chestnut =

American basketball player (1911–1983)

Personal information
- Born: September 27, 1911 Daviess County, Indiana, U.S.
- Died: September 18, 1983 (aged 71) Warren, Ohio, U.S.
- Listed height: 6 ft 5 in (1.96 m)
- Listed weight: 210 lb (95 kg)

Career information
- College: Indiana State (1930–1933)
- Playing career: 1934–1941
- Position: Power forward / center

Career history
- 1934–1935: Indianapolis Kautskys
- 1935–1936: Detroit Hed-Aids
- 1935–1940: Indianapolis Kautskys
- 1939–1940: Original Celtics
- 1940–1941: Indianapolis Kautskys

George Wallace Chestnut (September 27, 1911 – September 18, 1983) was an American professional basketball player. He played for the Indianapolis Kautskys for seven seasons; during his tenure, the Kautskys were an independent team, as well as member of the Midwest Basketball Conference, before it became the National Basketball League. During his professional career, he averaged 6.2 points per game, unfortunately, the records are incomplete.

In college, Chestnut lettered in football, basketball, and baseball for Indiana State University. He served in the United States Army during World War II for approximately 15 months.
