= Hymie Ginsburg =

American basketball player

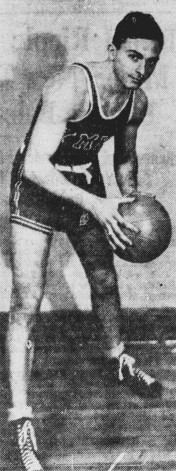
- Ginsburg, circa 1935

Personal information
- Born: March 23, 1914 Pennsylvania, U.S.
- Died: March 2, 1986 (aged 71) Canton, Ohio, U.S.
- Listed height: 5 ft 9 in (1.75 m)
- Listed weight: 170 lb (77 kg)

Career information
- High school: Beaver Falls; (Beaver Falls, Pennsylvania)
- College: Geneva (1931–1935)
- Position: Guard

Career history

Playing
- 1937–1939: Pittsburgh Pirates

Coaching
- 1962–1966: Walsh

Career highlights
- Small College All-American (1935)

Hyman L. "Hymie" Ginsburg (March 23, 1914 – March 2, 1986) was an American professional basketball player.

== Career ==
After playing at Geneva College, Ginsburg played in the National Basketball League for the Pittsburgh Pirates from 1937 to 1939. In his 15-game NBL career, Ginsburg averaged 5.6 points per game. Ginsburg later established the men's basketball program at Walsh University and served as their first head coach from 1962 to 1966.

== Career statistics ==
Legend
| GP | Games played | FGM | Field goals made |
| FTM | Free throws made | FTA | Free throws attempted |
| FT% | Free throw percentage | PTS | Total points |
| PPG | Points per game | **Bold** | Career high |

=== NBL ===
==== Regular season ====
| Year | Team | GP | FGM | FTM | PTS | PPG |
|---|---|---|---|---|---|---|
| 1937–38 | Pittsburgh | 13 | 36 | **20** | 92 | **7.1** |
| 1938–39 | Pittsburgh | **23** | **46** | 17 | **109** | 4.7 |
| Career | | 36 | 82 | 37 | 201 | 5.6 |
