= Bobby Colburn =

American basketball player

Personal information
- Born: March 23, 1911 Lockland, Ohio, U.S.
- Died: February 3, 2001 (aged 89) Hubbard, Ohio, U.S.
- Listed height: 5 ft 10 in (1.78 m)
- Listed weight: 190 lb (86 kg)

Career information
- High school: Stivers (Dayton, Ohio)
- College: Ohio State (1932–1935)
- Position: Forward

Career history
- 1935–1936: Dayton Metropolitans
- 1936–1937: Dayton London Bobbys
- 1937–1938: Dayton Metropolitans

Robert H. Coburn (March 23, 1911 – February 3, 2001) was an American professional basketball player. He played college basketball for Ohio State University. Colburn then played in the National Basketball League for the Dayton Metropolitans during the 1937–38 season and averaged 7.3 points per game. In his post-basketball life, Colburn became a high school teacher and basketball coach.
