= Marty Reiter =

American basketball player

Personal information
- Born: August 25, 1911 Pittsburgh, Pennsylvania, U.S.
- Died: February 6, 1986 (aged 74) Fort Lauderdale, Florida, U.S.
- Listed height: 5 ft 7 in (1.70 m)
- Listed weight: 160 lb (73 kg)

Career information
- High school: Fifth Avenue (Pittsburgh, Pennsylvania)
- College: Duquesne (1931–1934)
- Position: Guard

Career history
- 1937–1939: Pittsburgh Pirates

Martin E. Reiter (August 25, 1911 – February 6, 1986) was an American professional basketball player. He played college basketball for Duquesne University. Reiter then played in the National Basketball League for the Pittsburgh Pirates during the 1937–38 and 1938–39 seasons and averaged 4.8 points per game.
