= Dudey Moore =

American basketball player and coach

Biographical details
- Born: April 5, 1910; Pittsburgh, Pennsylvania, U.S.
- Died: April 8, 1984 (aged 74); Bristol, Pennsylvania, U.S.

Playing career
- 1931–1934: Duquesne
- 1937–1939: Pittsburgh Pirates

Coaching career (HC unless noted)
- 1948–1958: Duquesne
- 1958–1963: La Salle

Head coaching record
- Overall: 270–107 (college)
- Tournaments: 1–1 (NCAA); 11–8 (NIT)

Accomplishments and honors

Championships
- NIT (1955)

Donald W. "Dudey" Moore (April 5, 1910 – April 8, 1984) was an American college men's basketball coach. He was the head coach of Duquesne from 1948 to 1958 and La Salle from 1958 to 1963. He coached his teams to a 270–107 record, winning the 1955 National Invitation Tournament, making four further NIT semifinals appearances and making one NCAA tournament appearance (in 1952). Moore coached such players as Chuck Cooper, Si Green, Dick Ricketts, and Bill Raftery.

In college, Moore played for Duquesne under coach Chick Davies. He was inducted into the Duquesne athletics Hall of Fame in 1965.

In 1952 he was named the college basketball Coach of the Year by the New York Basketball Writers Association.

He coached Team USA to a gold medal at the 1961 Maccabiah Games in Israel, with a team that included Larry Brown (later a 3-time American Basketball Association All Star), along with Art Heyman (later the first overall pick in the first round of the 1963 NBA draft), and Charley Rosen.

== Head coaching record ==
=== NCAA ===
Record table
Season	Team	Overall	Conference	Standing	Postseason
Duquesne Dukes (NCAA University Division independent) (1948–1958)
1948–49	Duquesne	17–5			
1949–50	Duquesne	23–6			NIT Fourth Place
1950–51	Duquesne	16–11			
1951–52	Duquesne	23–4			NCAA Elite Eight, NIT Fourth Place
1952–53	Duquesne	21–8			NIT Third Place
1953–54	Duquesne	26–3			NIT Runner-up
1954–55	Duquesne	22–4			NIT Champions
1955–56	Duquesne	17–10			NIT Quarterfinal
1956–57	Duquesne	16–7			
1957–58	Duquesne	10–12			
Duquesne:		191–70 (.732)			
La Salle Explorers (Middle Atlantic Conference) (1958–1963)
1958–59	La Salle	16–7	5–2	2nd	
1959–60	La Salle	16–6	6–1	2nd	
1960–61	La Salle	15–7	7–2	3rd	
1961–62	La Salle	16–9	5–3	5th	
1962–63	La Salle	16–8	7–1	2nd	NIT First Round
La Salle:		79–37 (.681)	30–9 (.769)		
Total:		270–107 (.716)			
National champion Postseason invitational champion Conference regular season champion Conference regular season and conference tournament champion Division regular season champion Division regular season and conference tournament champion Conference tournament champion
