= Bob Lytle =

American basketball and football player (1916–1998)

Personal information
- Born: August 9, 1916 Warren, Pennsylvania
- Died: February 18, 1998 (aged 81) Titusville, Pennsylvania
- Listed height: 6 ft 4 in (1.93 m)
- Listed weight: 180 lb (82 kg)

Career information
- High school: Warren (Warren, Pennsylvania)
- College: Edinboro (1937–1940)
- Position: Forward

Career history
- 1934–1935: Warren Merchants
- 1935–1936: HyVis Oil
- 1937: Warren Penns

Robert Henry "Red" Lytle (August 9, 1916 – February 18, 1998) was an American professional basketball player. He played for the Warren Penns in the National Basketball League for one game during the 1937–38 season. In college, Lytle played football and basketball for Edinboro University of Pennsylvania.

After his brief professional basketball career, Lytle was a school teacher and coached high school football in Pennsylvania and then Ohio.
