= Frank Kautsky =

American professional basketball coach

Personal information
- Born: September 30, 1888 Edgewood, Indiana, US
- Died: October 11, 1959 (aged 71) Edgewood, Indiana, US
- Coaching career: 1931–1942

Career history
- 1931–1938; 1941–1942: Indianapolis Kautskys

Frank Henry "Fronzo" Kautsky Sr. (September 30, 1888 – October 11, 1959) was an American farmer, grocery store owner, and team owner, general manager, and former head coach of the Indianapolis Kautskys/Pure Oils/Oilers/Jets basketball franchise. He also was a semi-pro baseball player at one point and even sponsored a local semi-pro baseball team up until World War II that first started out as the Kautsky A.C. (Kautsky Athletic Club) or Kautsky's A.C. (Kautsky's Athletic Club) or even the Indianapolis Kautsky A.C.'s instead. Kautsky was also a co-founding member of the National Basketball League (NBL) alongside Paul Sheeks from the Akron Firestone Non-Skids, with the NBL eventually becoming a predecessor to the National Basketball Association (NBA).

== Professional career ==
Early on in his life, Kautsky farmed around his hometown of Edgewood until he was 29 years old. He also played baseball on a semi-pro basis during his early professional career. After that point, he became the owner of a small, local, family-owned grocery store chain called Kautsky's that first began at South Madison Avenue. The success of his local business allowed him to promote it as a part of other local sports teams up until the 1940s. In 1928, despite never even touching a basketball in his youth, he created a young, amateur team after a good friend of his, former Indiana Central College (now University of Indianapolis) basketball star Pete Bailey, took him to a local pick-up game at an elementary school. After being impressed by the young talents on display there, he and Bailey created an amateur team under Kautsky's sponsorship called the Kautsky A.C. (Kautsky Athletic Club) or Kautsky's A.C. (Kautsky's Athletic Club) or even Indianapolis Kautsky A.C.'s that ended up winning the state of Indiana's independent basketball title the following season. That team's success (which included wild promotions that sometimes related to his groceries and sometimes included them playing against independent barnstorming women's basketball teams) became the predecessor to what became the Indianapolis Kautskys professional basketball team (which was co-owned by Kautsky and Abe Goldsmith once it went professional) throughout the majority of its existence. One of the Kautskys' first players was John Wooden, who had to drive 115 miles to play home games in Indianapolis, but had an extra payment of $50 per game during the weekends in particular that paid more than his daily teaching job at Dayton High School at Dayton, Kentucky, which Wooden attributed as a vital payment during the height of the Great Depression due to him losing his life savings of $909.50 at the time. He also once paid $100 to Wooden directly during a game after briefly stopping it to celebrate his 100th professional free-throw made in a row; Wooden's record of 134 made is still considered the professional record for most free-throws made in a row to this day (for reference, the NBA record for consecutive free-throws made is 97 made in a row by Micheal Williams in 1993).

=== Early Kautskys ===
After beginning as an independent team (debuting on November 24, 1931 on the road against the Kokomo 66ers and later at home on December 11 against the Fort Wayne Firemen), the Kautskys made their professional debut in the short-lived National Professional Basketball League for the 1932–33 season (where they finished with a 7–4 record, but were a win behind the Toledo Crimson Coaches Tobaccos from competing against the Akron Firestone Non-Skids in the only NPBL championship event) before returning to their independent roots the following two seasons due in part to the Great Depression. After that point, once Kautsky gathered enough money to ensure his team would survive outside of being an independent team, they took part in the newly formed Midwest Basketball Conference, which Kautsky was a co-owner of at the time alongside Akron Firestone Non-Skids team owner and head coach Paul Sheeks and eventually became the future predecessor to the National Basketball League. During their first season in the newly founded conference, the Kautskys finished with the best record in the Western Division with a 9–3 record, where they then blew out the Pittsburgh YMHA's with a 46–18 score, but lost to the upstart Chicago Duffy Florals (who controversially replaced the Detroit Hed-Aids in the inaugural MBC (later NBL) playoffs held for what appeared to be monetary reasons) in a close, 39–35 championship match under a Round Robin tournament. Their second season there, however, finished much worse than the first, with the Kautskys finishing with a 2–5 record that season (failing to qualify for the MBC playoffs that season entirely, even if they did have a good record once again) before the MBC technically concluded their operations. Once the MBC rebranded itself to the NBL (mainly as a means to stop local confusion between it and the college basketball conference called the Big Ten Conference that operates in the same, general vicinity), the Kautskys became one of the inaugural teams of the new league for that season.

In every season that the Kautskys existed in up until the inaugural NBL season, Frank Kautsky was both the team's head coach and general manager in addition to the team owner. However, after finishing the 1937–38 NBL season with a 4–9 record as one of the worst teams of the league, Kautsky stepped down from his head coach position and gave that role to Bob Nipper the following season. During that season, the Kautskys under Nipper's coaching finished the season with a 13–13 record for second place in the Western Division, though they failed to reach the championship series due to them being behind the Oshkosh All-Stars that season. Despite Nipper's success that season as head coach, he was replaced by player-coach Ward Meyers the following season. In the 1939–40 season, the Kautskys finished with an even worse record at 9–19 before Frank Kautsky decided to briefly move his team out of the NBL and into the Amateur Athletic Union, thus making themselves an independent franchise once again. Despite that situation, the Kautskys did find some play at the World Professional Basketball Tournament in 1941, where they ultimately lost early in the first round to the Detroit Eagles by a 58–43 final score. After losing in the first round at the WPBT, Kautsky decided to let his team return to the NBL for the 1941–42 season, this time returning to the head coaching role he first had with the team alongside his team ownership and general manager duties. During a December 7, 1941 road game played in the day against the Toledo Jim White Chevrolets (which the Kautskys would lose to go 2–2 in the season, with Toledo getting one of their scant few victories that season on that date), the loud speakers of the home arena interrupted the game to inform the audience that the Japanese had just attacked Pearl Harbor. This attack later led to the United States of America declaring war on Japan and subsequently entering World War II days later.

=== The Kautskys during/after World War II ===
Despite the United States entering World War II, the NBL and other professional sports leagues continued operations without much issue. For the Kautskys, they finished the season with a 12–11 record (with many of the losses occurring after the Pearl Harbor announcement since players either volunteered or got drafted into the U.S. military), which earned them a playoff spot for the first time in NBL history. However, their appearance was short-lived, as they were swept by the eventual champion Oshkosh All-Stars in a best-of-3 first round series match-up. They also appeared in the 1942 World Professional Basketball Tournament, though they lost once again in the first round, this time to the Long Island Grumman Flyers by a 54–32 final score. After that season concluded, Kautsky made the decision to skip out on his team competing in subsequent NBL seasons up until World War II ended. His decision was met with controversy at the time, but Kautsky held firm on that decision under those following seasons. However, the team did not completely exit out of the professional sports scene during the war; during the 1943–1945 World Professional Basketball Tournament competitions, the team competed under the temporary new monikers of the Indianapolis Pure Oils for 1943 and 1944 and then the Indianapolis Oilers for the 1945 event. Despite the temporary name changes in those years, the Pure Oils and Oilers never managed to escape the first round in any of those years due to them losing close matches to the Fort Wayne Zollner Pistons, the Cleveland Chase Brassmen, and the New York Rens in those respective years. Once World War II concluded, Frank Kautsky reinstated both the original Kautskys team name and their spot in the National Basketball League in time for the start of their 1945–46 NBL season. That season saw the number of teams increase from 6 total teams to 8 after they previously were stuck with only 4 available teams at one point due to World War II. Under the coaching duties of player-coach Nat Hickey that season, the Kautskys finished their return to the NBL with a 10–22 record, which became the worst record in the Western Division that season. They also failed to exit out of the first round of the World Professional Basketball Tournament once again, this time losing 72–59 to the Midland Dow Chemicals. To make matters worse, the share of the Kautskys that was owned by Abe Goldsmith was later sold to Paul A. Walk, which left the team's impending future in question.

The following season became the franchise's best ever. Under the improving talent of Arnie Risen and being led by player-coaches Ernie Andres, Bob Dietz, and Herm Schaefer during various points of the season, the Kautskys finished the season with their best record ever at 27–17, being only a win behind the Oshkosh All-Stars for the best Western Division record that season. Unfortunately for the Kautskys, they would lose their opening round to the eventual champions, the Chicago American Gears, 3–2 under the leading talent of George Mikan. However, they also competed in the 1947 World Professional Basketball Tournament (which was mostly made up of NBL teams that season), winning their only championship there by getting a first-round bye alongside the Fort Wayne Zollner Pistons due to them being long-time competitors there, then winning their first ever WPBT match by a 65–56 score over the Tri-Cities Blackhawks on April 9, 1947, which was followed by the Kautskys blowing out the Oshkosh All-Stars 59–38 the next day and then beating the Toledo Jeeps 62–47 the day after that for the championship. However, the Kautskys could not keep up their success from the previous season when entering what became their final season with the NBL. Under a further rotating carousel of head coaches between former Detroit Falcons head coach Glenn M. Curtis and player-coaches Leo Klier and Bruce Hale, the Kautskys finished their final season under that name and in the NBL with a 24–35 record. Despite that record, the Kautskys barely qualified to compete in the 1948 NBL Playoffs due to them finishing the season with a better record than the Sheboygan Red Skins alongside the fact that every other team in the Western Division outside of the Minneapolis Lakers finishing no better than a 30–30 record. In their last trip to the NBL Playoffs, the Kautskys split the first two games with the Tri-Cities Blackhawks before the Blackhawks took over the rest of the first-round series, winning the opening round 3–1.

Once the 1947–48 NBL season concluded, Frank Kautsky had a difficult decision to make regarding his team's future: jump ship to the rivaling Basketball Association of America alongside the Minneapolis Lakers, Rochester Royals, and Fort Wayne Zollner Pistons to deal with a greater difficulty in opponents at hand or stay with the National Basketball League that he helped create and risk having his team not survive in the not-so-distant future. He ultimately decided to join the Lakers, Royals, and Zollner Pistons in their move from the NBL to the BAA, with the caveat that the Indianapolis Kautskys changed their team name to something else that was unaffiliated with any sponsorships (i.e., removing the Kautskys sponsorship for his grocery store), similar to the Zollner Pistons removing the Zollner part of their team name to join up as the Fort Wayne Pistons. For Kautsky, rather than renaming the team to something like the Pure Oils or Oilers like when they competed in the WPBT during World War II, he decided to rename them to the Indianapolis Jets in order to make their league transition official. However, he decided to sell his shares of the team to Paul A. Walk before the upcoming BAA season began due to costs starting to get really high for him. For the 1948 BAA draft, the newly named Jets selected George Kok as the second overall pick of that draft year, though Kok would never play either in the BAA with the Jets or elsewhere in the NBA. In what became their only season in the BAA, the Jets finished the season with an 18–42 record. They started the season with an 84–80 win over the St. Louis Bombers and finished the season with a chaotic 90–84 win over the Providence Steamrollers, but the Jets followed their first win with an 8-game losing streak and could not recover from it afterward. Once the 1948–49 BAA season concluded, the BAA began their talks on merging their league with the NBL to create the preceding NBA that still exists to this day. During those talks, it was revealed that the NBL intended to have a new expansion team playing in Indianapolis (which became the Indianapolis Olympians) for what was originally planned to be their 1949–50 NBL season, and neither league had any intentions to allow for two professional teams to play games in Indianapolis for one united league. As a result of the awkward situation there, the two leagues forced the Jets team to fold following the end of the 1949 BAA draft and defer their players to other teams in the new league on August 3, 1949, thus joining the Providence Steamrollers as the only other BAA casualty from the planned NBL-BAA merger for the NBA, while the NBL brought the Olympians expansion team over to join the Anderson (Duffey) Packers, the original Denver Nuggets, the Sheboygan Red Skins, the Syracuse Nationals, the Tri-Cities Blackhawks, and the Waterloo Hawks in their official merger into the NBA.

== Later years and death ==
After losing his professional basketball team, Kautsky continued focusing on his successful, local grocery store business out in Edgewood, Indiana. In 1950, his first wife, Loretta Hazel Stuck, died, leaving behind four sons and three daughters at the time of her death. Kautsky later remarried at some point during the 1950s and remained dedicated to his grocery business that stayed near the Indianapolis region until his death on October 11, 1959. Kautsky's Grocery Store remained in business until 1970, with one of the buildings currently hosting an Asian grocery story. At the time of his death, Kautsky was survived by his wife Lucile Kautsky, as well as his sons Donald Lee, Norman (E.), and Lawrence "Cycle" Clarence, his four daughters who married to James W. Johnston (Dorothy Mae Kautsky), John W. Gray (Elizabeth "Betty" Gray), J. W. Kegley, and Irvin Kirk, his sister Clara A. Kautsky Wright, and 15 grandchildren. One of his sons, Frank Henry "Fronnie" Kautsky Jr., suffered from blindness and diabetes for most of his life. Despite those setbacks in Fronnie's life, he became a milkman and owner of a sundries store for most of his adult life until his death in 1956.

== Head coaching record ==
Legend
| Regular season | G | Games coached | W | Games won | L | Games lost | W–L % | Win–loss % |
| Playoffs | PG | Playoff games | PW | Playoff wins | PL | Playoff losses | PW–L % | Playoff win–loss % |

| Team | Year | G | W | L | W–L% | Finish | PG | PW | PL | PW–L% | Result |
|---|---|---|---|---|---|---|---|---|---|---|---|
| Indianapolis | 1932–33 | 11 | 7 | 4 | .636 | 3rd in the NPBL | — | — | — | — | Missed championship series |
| Indianapolis | 1935–36 | 12 | 9 | 3 | .750 | 1st in the Western Division (MBC) | 2 | 1 | 1 | .500 | Won first round against Pittsburgh Y.M.H.A. 46–18; Lost championship match against Chicago Duffy Florals 39–35 |
| Indianapolis | 1936–37 | 7 | 2 | 5 | .286 | 5th in Western (MBC) | — | — | — | — | Missed playoffs |
| Indianapolis | 1937–38 | 13 | 4 | 9 | .308 | 4th in Western (NBL) | — | — | — | — | Missed playoffs |
| Indianapolis | 1941–42 | 23 | 12 | 11 | .522 | 4th in the NBL | 2 | 0 | 2 | .000 | Lost first round to Oshkosh All-Stars 0–2 |
| Career | | 66 | 34 | 32 | .515 | | 4 | 1 | 3 | .250 | |
