= Indianapolis Jets =

- Leagues: NPBL: 1932–1933; MBC: 1935–1937; NBL: 1937–1948; BAA: 1948–1949
- Founded: 1931
- Folded: 1949
- History: Indianapolis Kautsky A.C.'s; 1931–1932 (Independent); Indianapolis Kautskys; 1932–1942; Indianapolis Pure Oils; 1943–1944 (WPBT); Indianapolis Oilers; 1945 (WPBT); Indianapolis Kautskys; 1945–1948 (NBL); Indianapolis Jets; 1948–1949 (BAA)
- Arena: Butler Fieldhouse (15,000)
- Location: Indianapolis, Indiana
- Team colors: Red, navy blue, white
- Ownership: Frank Kautsky
Home	Away	Third

The Indianapolis Jets were a Basketball Association of America (BAA) team based in Indianapolis. They were founded as the Indianapolis Kautskys and used that name until the team joined the BAA. They played for one year in the BAA and then ceased operations due to the formation of the Indianapolis Olympians.

== Franchise history ==
In 1931, Frank Kautsky, an Indianapolis grocer, formed a professional basketball team and named it the Indianapolis Kautskys. They were initially known as the Indianapolis Kautsky A.C.'s during their first independent season of existence, as Kautsky had operated both a basketball club and a baseball club under that banner during that period of time. Their first game was on November 24, 1931, which they won 37–18 against the Kokomo 66ers in Kokomo, Indiana. Their first home game would be on December 11, where they'd win 31–17 over the Fort Wayne Firemen. After playing in the National Professional Basketball League (NPBL) in 1932–33 and the Midwest Basketball Conference (MBC) in the 1935–36 and 1936–37) seasons, the Kautskys became one of the original members of the newly formed National Basketball League (NBL) in 1937.

The franchise's best season was in 1946–47; led by Arnie Risen, they set the franchise mark for most wins (27) and won the World Professional Basketball Tournament.

With the Minneapolis Lakers, Rochester Royals, and Fort Wayne Pistons, the team moved to the Basketball Association of America (BAA) for the 1948–49 season. At that time the team's name was changed to the Indianapolis Jets because the BAA prevented its teams from having commercial sponsors, similar to how the Fort Wayne Pistons removed the Zollner sponsor from their original name. With the team's inclusion into the BAA, they effectively replaced the already defunct BAA Indianapolis franchise that was originally planned for the league, but never played a single game there.

Following the 1948–49 season, the Jets folded alongside the Providence Steamrollers on August 3, 1949. This coincided with the BAA and the NBL merging to form the National Basketball Association (NBA). For the 1949–50 season, a new Indianapolis franchise, the Indianapolis Olympians, was created.

== Season-by-season records ==
Note: W = wins, L = losses, % = win–loss %

Season	W	L	%	Playoffs	Results
Indianapolis Kautskys (NPBL)
1932–33	7	4	0.636	Did not qualify	—
Indianapolis Kautskys (MBC)
1935–36	9	3	0.750	Lost Round Robin Championship	Won 46–18 over Pittsburgh Y.M.H.A. Lost 35–39 to Chicago Duffy Florals
1936–37	2	5	0.286	Did not qualify	—
Indianapolis Kautskys (NBL)
1937–38	4	9	0.308	Did not qualify	—
1938–39	13	13	0.500	Did not qualify	—
1939–40	9	19	0.321	Did not qualify	—
1941–42	12	11	0.522	NBL Semifinals	Lost 0–2 to Oshkosh All-Stars
1945–46	10	22	0.312	Did not qualify	—
1946–47	27	17	0.614	Western Division opening round	Lost 2–3 to Chicago American Gears
1947–48	24	35	0.407	Western Division opening round	Lost 1–3 to Tri-Cities Blackhawks
Indianapolis Jets (BAA)
1948–49	18	42	0.300	Did not qualify	—

== Players ==
- Ernie Andres
- George Chestnut
- Norman Cottom
- Gene Cramer
- Gus Doerner
- Glynn Downey
- Leroy Edwards
- Hal Gensichen
- George Glamack
- Bruce Hale
- Bob Kessler
- Branch McCracken
- Charles "Stretch" Murphy
- William Perigo
- Cy Proffitt
- Ash Resnick
- Arnie Risen
- Herm Schaefer
- Jim Springer
- Dave Strack
- Earl Thomas
- John Wooden
- Jewell Young

== Basketball Hall of Famers ==
Indianapolis Jets Hall of Famers
Players
No.	Name	Position	Tenure	Inducted
—	Arnie Risen	C	1945–1948	1998
—	John Wooden	G	1932–1937; 1938–1939	1960
—	Charles "Stretch" Murphy	C	1932–1934	1960
—	Branch McCracken	C/F/G	—	1960
