= Pittsburgh Pirates (NBL) =

Pittsburgh Y.M.H.A. / Pirates / Raiders
- Leagues: National Basketball League
- Founded: 1931; 1937; 1944
- Dissolved: 1939; 1950
- History: Pittsburgh Y.M.H.A. (1931–1937); Pittsburgh Pirates (1937–1939); Pittsburgh Raiders (1944–1945)
- Location: Pittsburgh, Pennsylvania

The Pittsburgh Pirates were an American professional basketball team based in Pittsburgh, Pennsylvania. The team was one of the thirteen founding members of the National Basketball League (NBL), which formed in 1937. However, their early history began as far back as 1931 due to them being founded from their local Young Men's Hebrew Association, later being a founding team for the Midwest Basketball Conference, a precursor to the National Basketball League.

== Franchise history ==
The team was first founded in 1931 by the local Young Men's Hebrew Association (hence the team shortening its name to the Pittsburgh Y.M.H.A.) as a way for the local Jews to compete against both YMCA and other amateur teams while remaining in shape. In due time, however, they ended up becoming a barnstorming team that toured throughout the northeastern parts of the United States of America, which spoke toward the strong presence the Jewish community had upon the sport of basketball at the time. This presence later led to the Pittsburgh Y.M.H.A. team becoming one of the eight (later nine) inaugural teams to create the Midwest Basketball Conference in 1935. During the 1935–36 season, Pittsburgh would have the second-best record in the Eastern Division with a 10–7 record (one game behind the Akron Firestone Non-Skids), which led to them qualifying for the MBC's inaugural playoffs, which was a round robin tournament of sorts between the four teams that qualified for the playoffs that season. Unfortunately for the Y.M.H.A. squad, they would not only lose to the Indianapolis Kautskys 46–18, but also lose their consolation third place match to Akron with a 33–29, all on March 22, 1936. That would later turn out to be the highlight of their professional history, as the following season after that, the Y.M.H.A. squad finished with a league-worst 2–9 record. By 1937, not only would the MBC rebrand itself into the National Basketball League to have better coverage within the U.S.A., but the Pittsburgh franchise would rebrand themselves to the Pirates both as a homage to the Major League Baseball team of the same name and as a way to help expand their roster coverage to utilize more creeds and races beyond just white Jewish people in the future.

Once the MBC transitioned itself into the NBL, the team never played in the playoffs in their three seasons within the NBL. From inception and through its first 2 seasons the team was named the "Pirates" until the franchise was inactivated from the summer of 1939 until the summer of 1944, reappearing as the Pittsburgh Raiders for a final season in 1944–45. Despite them leaving the NBL, the Raiders would still participate in the 1946 World Professional Basketball Tournament as an independent team, with the NBL even being interested in bringing back the Pittsburgh franchise for the 1946–47 season at one point in time before a new team in Toledo, Ohio (though some sports historians believe that it was actually the same Toledo NBL franchise that first came on board from before/during the World War II era in the Toledo White Huts/Jim White Chevrolets, just being run by completely different ownership instead) called the Toledo Jeeps essentially bought out the NBL spot that would have been for the Raiders, which subsequently ended any future attempts for the NBL to return to the city of Pittsburgh (especially since the Pittsburgh Ironmen of the Basketball Association of America would hold a professional basketball spot there in a newfound, rivaling league that season). Even with that in mind, the Raiders would still exist as a franchise until 1950, with later years for them as a franchise having them exist in a minor basketball league of sorts called the AAL for a few seasons before disbanding for good due to how great the competitive scale had grown with the (at the time) newly-formed National Basketball Association taking shape as a professional basketball league.

== Year-by-year ==
Year	Record	Reg. season	Playoffs
1935–36	10–7 (.722)	2nd, Eastern	Lost Round Robin Tournament (4th Place)
1936–37	2–9 (.182)	6th, Eastern	Did not qualify
1937–38	8–5 (.615)	3rd, Eastern	Did not qualify
1938–39	13–14 (.481)	4th, Eastern	Did not qualify
No team from 1939–44
1944–45	7–23 (.233)	3rd Eastern	Did not qualify
