= 1937–38 Kankakee Gallagher Trojans season =

NBL professional basketball team season

- Head coach: Don Betourne (player-coach)
- Owner: Ed Black
- Arena: Kankakee National Guard Armory

Results
- Record: 3–11 (.214)
- Place: Division: 6th (Western)
- Playoff finish: Did not qualify

The 1937–38 Kankakee Gallagher Trojans season was the first and only professional season played for the Gallagher Trojans franchise out in the small city of Kankakee, Illinois under the National Basketball League, which officially was the first season that it existed as a professional basketball league after previously existing as a semi-pro or amateur basketball league called the Midwest Basketball Conference in its first two seasons back in 1935. The Kankakee Gallagher Trojans joined the Richmond King Clothiers (later turned Cincinnati Comellos during the season) and later Oshkosh All-Stars as one of three new teams to join the NBL once the league changed its name from the MBC to the NBL. This team got the Gallagher part of their team name from the fact that many of their players were originally alumni from the local Gallagher Business School at the time, to the point where many of its players not only never played professional basketball before this season, but actually never played it again afterward as well. Still, they would be one of seven teams to compete in the Western Division this season, with them representing thirteen inaugural NBL teams to compete in the first season under the NBL name, comprising six teams competing in the Eastern Division and seven teams competing in the Western Division.

Their first NBL match against the Whiting Ciesar All-Americans on December 1, 1937, had the Gallagher Trojans looking pretty competitive at first by not only having a 13–12 lead after the first quarter, but being tied with them 23–23 at halftime before losing gas in the second half to lose 50–32. In fact, it would be because of their inexperience as a franchise (with them being more of an amateur franchise coming from students involving the Gallagher Business School (a trade school that focused on the business world) that was masquerading as a professional basketball team at times) that would cause them to have a very poor finish in their only season in the NBL after starting out the season 0–4 (including them giving the only victory to the Richmond King Clothiers before they moved to Cincinnati, Ohio to become the Cincinnati Comellos for the rest of their only season of play) by the time the Oshkosh All-Stars played their first game of the NBL season in January 1938 (after Oshkosh was a late entry into the NBL's opening season by December 1938) with three wins and eleven losses to the Gallagher Trojans' name (with at least one of their victories being confirmed to happen at their home venue with a 46–44 overtime victory over the Dayton Metropolitans, though as many as all three of their victories (two of them being back-to-back wins that were also against the Dayton Metropolitans) might be at their home venue). In fact, their record was so bad that the only two teams with a worse record than them this season was the only team that Kankakee finished ahead of in their division (and the only team they could win against this season), the Dayton Metropolitans with two wins and eleven losses, and the Columbus Athletic Supply, who only had one win against the aforementioned Dayton Metropolitans when the two teams competed against each other on back-to-back occasions early on in the season and 12 losses in their only NBL season under that league name.

Despite the objective failure they had in their first and only season in the NBL, team owner Ed Black proclaimed that the Gallagher Trojans would return to the NBL in its second season with a stronger roster, with six players from this team (presumably their best players from this season) being planned to return to action by as early as December 3, 1938. However, their return to the NBL ultimately never materialized and the Kankakee Gallagher Trojans franchise ended up fading into obscurity not long afterward as one of six inaugural NBL teams to fold operations from the league altogether.

== Roster ==
Please note that due to the way records for professional basketball leagues like the NBL and the ABL were recorded at the time, some information on both teams and players may be harder to list out than usual here.

Player	Position
Don Betourne	F
Bob DeWeese	G
Fred Grafft	G
Warren Hair	G
Johnny Hoekstra	C
Big Moose Meyer	F-C
Little Moose Meyer	G
Louie Sauer	F-C
Don Walsh	F
Tarzan Woltzen	G-F

== Regular season ==
=== Season standings ===
Pos	Western Division	Wins	Losses	Win %
1	Oshkosh All-Stars	12	2	.857
2	Whiting Ciesar All-Americans	12	3	.800
3	Fort Wayne General Electrics	13	7	.650
4	Indianapolis Kautskys	4	9	.308
5	Richmond King Clothiers / Cincinnati Comellos^{‡}	3	7	.300
6	Kankakee Gallagher Trojans	3	11	.214
7	Dayton Metropolitans	2	11	.154
^{‡} Richmond relocated to Cincinnati during the season and assumed Richmond's record in the standings. Richmond's record was 1–2 and Cincinnati's record was 2–5.

=== NBL Schedule ===
An official database created by John Grasso detailing every NBL match possible (outside of two matches that the Kankakee Gallagher Trojans won over the Dayton Metropolitans in 1938) would be released in 2026 showcasing every team's official schedules throughout their time spent in the NBL. As such, outside of the two games where the Kankakee Gallagher Trojans won over the Dayton Metropolitans sometime in 1938 (potentially in February 1938 via forfeiture), these are the official results recorded for the Kankakee Gallagher Trojans in their only season in the NBL.

- November 28, 1937 @ Kankakee, IL: Whiting Ciesar All-Americans 48, Kankakee Gallagher Trojans 32
- November 29, 1937 @ Richmond, IN: Kankakee Gallagher Trojans 31, Richmond King Clothiers 39
- December 8, 1937 @ Kankakee, IL: Fort Wayne General Electrics 38, Kankakee Gallagher Trojans 19
- December 22, 1937 @ Kankakee, IL: Akron Goodyear Wingfoots 45, Kankakee Gallagher Trojans 26
- January 4, 1938 @ Oshkosh, WI: Kankakee Gallagher Trojans 42, Oshkosh All-Stars 75
- January 19, 1938 @ Akron, OH: Kankakee Gallagher Trojans 22, Akron Goodyear Wingfoots 37
- January 30, 1938 @ Whiting, IN: Kankakee Gallagher Trojans 38, Whiting Ciesar All-Americans 61
- February 1938 (potential doubleheader match?): The Kankakee Gallagher Trojans would win the match they played over the Dayton Metropolitans.
- February 1938 (potential doubleheader match?): The Kankakee Gallagher Trojans would win the match they played over the Dayton Metropolitans.
- February 2, 1938 @ Oshkosh, WI: Kankakee Gallagher Trojans 35, Oshkosh All-Stars 68
- February 5, 1938: Dayton Metropolitans 44, Kankakee Gallagher Trojans 46 (OT @ Kankakee, IL)
- February 7, 1938 @ Plainfield, WI: Kankakee Gallagher Trojans 40, Oshkosh All-Stars 56
- February 8, 1938 @ Oshkosh, WI: Kankakee Gallagher Trojans 33, Oshkosh All-Stars 58
- February 16, 1938 @ Fort Wayne, IN: Kankakee Gallagher Trojans 42, Fort Wayne General Electrics 75

Kankakee would also host an NBL game between the Akron Goodyear Wingfoots and the Indianapolis Kautskys for some odd reason on December 28, 1937, with Akron's Goodyear squad defeating the Kautskys 34–31 that night.
