= 1937–38 Richmond King Clothiers / Cincinnati Comellos season =

NBL professional basketball team season

- Head coach: Bob "McConas" McConachie (Richmond / early Cincinnati; 1–4); John Wiethe (Cincinnati's player-coach for the rest of the season; 2–3)
- Owner(s): Bob "McConas" McConachie (Richmond King Clothiers); Augustino "Gus" Comello (Cincinnati Comellos)
- Arena: Richmond Civic Auditorium (Richmond King Clothiers); Freeman Avenue Armory Gym (Cincinnati Comellos)

Results
- Record: 3–7 (.300)
- Place: Division: 5th (Western)
- Playoff finish: Did not qualify (Richmond sold franchise to Cincinnati; Cincinnati was forced to end season early due to flooding in their area)

The 1937–38 Richmond King Clothiers / Cincinnati Comellos season was the first and only professional season of play for both the Richmond King Clothiers (who promoted the local King Clothier business in Richmond, Indiana for the first three games they played in their season) and the Cincinnati Comellos (who were renamed to the Comellos after new team owner, Augustino "Gus" Comello, bought the franchise from Bob "McConas" McConachie and had them play in Cincinnati, Ohio for the rest of the season afterward (which turned out to be seven games long due to a flooding in the Cincinnati area essentially cancelling any further games played for the Comellos this season)) under the National Basketball League, which officially was the first season that it existed as a professional basketball league after previously existing as a semi-pro or amateur basketball league called the Midwest Basketball Conference in its first two seasons back in 1935. Regardless of whether they played in Richmond or Cincinnati, they were still one of seven teams to compete in the Western Division this season, with them representing thirteen inaugural NBL teams to compete in the first season under the NBL name, comprising six teams competing in the Eastern Division and seven teams competing in the Western Division (with them being the only team this season to have merged records between two different team names).

Originally, the franchise first began play in Richmond, Indiana as the Richmond King Clothiers as a means to help promote a local clothing department store called King Clothier, but it would essentially fold operations by December 1937 after playing only three NBL games (with home games played at the Richmond Civic Auditorium) due to the high costs of operating the team during that time for the clothing department store owner (Bob "McConas" McConachie), with Cincinnati resident Augustino "Gus" Comello buying out the franchise from the clothing department store owner on January 16, 1938 (with the move first being announced on January 5, 1938) and moving the team to his home area to have them become the Cincinnati Comellos for the rest of their season afterward (with the Comellos inheriting the 1–2 record that the Richmond King Clothiers had in the process, with their one win being a victory they had at home at the Richmond Civic Auditorium). While the Comellos would see themselves playing more games as a franchise than the King Clothiers did (playing seven games as a team, though getting a 2–5 record, including replacing head coach Bob "McConas" McConachie (who held a 1–4 record between the five games he coached for the King Clothiers and Comellos franchises), with player-coach John Wiethe for a better 2–3 record for their second half of the season (with them having doubleheader wins over the Columbus Athletic Supply team, with their two Cincinnati wins also happening at home as well), the Comellos ultimately wouldn't see their potential as a team continue on for much longer when the aftermath of the Ohio River flood of 1937 caused the Comellos to cut their only NBL season short by the spring of 1938 and subsequently cancel any further seasons at hand altogether since the city of Cincinnati sought to rebuild their city (including the Freeman Avenue Armory Gym home venue, likely speaking) from the flooding that occurred during that time.

Even with the flooding cutting their only season short, the King Clothiers turned Comellos franchise would still not have qualified for the first ever NBL Playoffs ever held for that season anyways due to them not only playing a total of 10 games for their season (with a minimum of 13 games being necessary to qualify for a playoff spot this season), but also due to them finishing their only season in fifth place in their division, being ahead of only the Kankakee Gallagher Trojans (another new team that joined the NBL) and the Dayton Metropolitans (a team that appeared in the two MBC seasons before it became the NBL). Because of this team's unique situation at hand, the Richmond King Clothiers turned Cincinnati Comellos became one of six inaugural NBL teams to essentially fold operations from the league altogether.

== Roster ==
Please note that due to the way records for professional basketball leagues like the NBL and the ABL were recorded at the time, some information on both teams and players may be harder to list out than usual here.

Player	Position
Stan Arnzen	F
Carl Austing	F-C
Harold Bower	G
Ken Jordan	F
Joe Kruse	G
Gene Mechling	G
Leo Sack	G
Junior Saffer	F
Frank Shamel	F
Earl Thomas	C
Norm Wagner	C
John Wiethe	G-F
Loren Wright	F

It's ultimately unknown as of 2026 as to which players played just for the Richmond King Clothiers, which players played just for the Cincinnati Comellos, and which players might have played for both Richmond and Cincinnati (though it is implied that the players that only played in three games for the team were those that played for Richmond only, while those that played for more than seven games were among those that played for both Richmond and Cincinnati in their only season of play). However, it's also suggested that one player that was confirmed to play only for the Cincinnati Comellos had the last name of Sanders in a January 30, 1938 game against the Indianapolis Kautskys, though no other information has been found involving this specific individual as well.

== Regular season ==
=== Season standings ===
Pos	Western Division	Wins	Losses	Win %
1	Oshkosh All-Stars	12	2	.857
2	Whiting Ciesar All-Americans	12	3	.800
3	Fort Wayne General Electrics	13	7	.650
4	Indianapolis Kautskys	4	9	.308
5	Richmond King Clothiers / Cincinnati Comellos^{‡}	3	7	.300
6	Kankakee Gallagher Trojans	3	11	.214
7	Dayton Metropolitans	2	11	.154
^{‡} Richmond relocated to Cincinnati during the season and assumed Richmond's record in the standings. Richmond's record was 1–2 and Cincinnati's record was 2–5.

=== NBL Schedule ===
An official database created by John Grasso detailing every NBL match possible (outside of two matches that the Kankakee Gallagher Trojans won over the Dayton Metropolitans in 1938) would be released in 2026 showcasing every team's official schedules throughout their time spent in the NBL. As such, these are the official results recorded for both the Richmond King Clothiers for the only three games they played in the NBL and the Cincinnati Comellos for the rest of the season afterward when they took over the placement and record that the Richmond King Clothiers originally held.

- November 29, 1937 @ Richmond, IN: Kankakee Gallagher Trojans 31, Richmond King Clothiers 39
- December 2, 1937 @ Fort Wayne, IN: Richmond King Clothiers 23, Fort Wayne General Electrics 50
- December 6, 1937: Whiting Ciesar All-Americans 39, Richmond King Clothiers 38 (OT @ Richmond Civic Auditorium in Richmond, IN)
- January 9, 1938 @ Whiting, IN: Cincinnati Comellos 43, Whiting Ciesar All-Americans 46
- January 23, 1938 (Game 1 @ Columbus, OH): Columbus Athletic Supply 16, Cincinnati Comellos 31
- January 23, 1938 (Game 2 @ Columbus, OH): Columbus Athletic Supply 22, Cincinnati Comellos 28
- January 29, 1938 (Game 1 @ Oshkosh, WI): Cincinnati Comellos 26, Oshkosh All-Stars 43
- January 29, 1938 (Game 2 @ Oshkosh, WI): Cincinnati Comellos 15, Oshkosh All-Stars 42
- January 30, 1938 @ Indianapolis, IN: Cincinnati Comellos 23, Indianapolis Kautskys 55
- February 13, 1938 @ Cincinnati, OH: The Fort Wayne General Electrics won over the Cincinnati Comellos by forced forfeiture for the rest of Cincinnati's season. (As such, 2–0 favoring Fort Wayne would be the official recorded score for this match.)
