= 1937–38 Whiting Ciesar All-Americans season =

NBL professional basketball team season

- Head coach: Whitey Wickhorst
- General manager: Edward "Eddie" Ciesar
- Owner: Edward "Eddie" Ciesar
- Arena: Whiting Community Center

Results
- Record: 12–3 (.800)
- Place: Division: 2nd (Western)
- Playoff finish: Lost Western Division Playoff to Oshkosh All-Stars, 2–0

The 1937–38 Whiting Ciesar All-Americans season was the first (and technically only) professional basketball season of play for the Whiting Ciesar All-Americans in the small city of Whiting, Indiana under the National Basketball League, which officially was the first season that it existed as a professional basketball league after previously existing as a semi-pro or amateur basketball league called the Midwest Basketball Conference in its first two seasons back in 1935. However, if you include their brief time as an independent team before later joining the Midwest Basketball Conference in its second and final season of existence, this would officially be considered at least their third season of existence as a team. Not only that, but the Ciesar All-Americans are also one of nine MBC teams from the previous season (one of ten overall MBC teams if you include the original Buffalo Bisons NBL team) to join the inaugural NBL season as it rebranded itself from the MBC to the NBL professional basketball league, with the Richmond King Clothiers / Cincinnati Comellos, Kankakee Gallagher Trojans, and the Oshkosh All-Stars (the last team by December 1937) being the only non-MBC teams joining the NBL for this season. The All-Americans franchise was owned by car dealer Eddie Ciesar during their time in Whiting, hence the addition of the Ciesar part to the Ciesar All-Americans' team name. Whiting would play their inaugural NBL season alongside thirteen other teams in the newly created league, comprising six teams in the Eastern Division and seven teams in the Western Division (which was Whiting's division in question).

Before the Oshkosh All-Stars would lose their first game in the NBL as a late addition to their inaugural season by January 1938 (alongside the Columbus Athletic Supply team) against Whiting on January 10, 1938, the Whiting Ciesar All-Americans would already play the highest number of scheduled games yet in the NBL, with them playing a total of seven games in their season and having a 4–3 record, which was good enough for third place in their division behind only the Fort Wayne General Electrics (who were 3–1 at that point in time) and the Dayton Metropolitans (who actually won their first game of the season before going on a massive slide backwards for the rest of their season onward to become the worst team in their division instead). Despite the high number of games played early in their season, they would nearly be halfway done with their regular season by that point in time, as a lack of proper team scheduling led to them playing only seven more games in their season following their match against Oshkosh for a 12–3 finish to their season. Despite playing a lower number of games than what the NBL would have liked to see planned for their teams this season, it would turn out to be advantageous to the Ciesar All-Americans since their win percentage would be high enough to favor them over the Fort Wayne General Electrics to qualify for one of the two Western Division Playoff spots alongside the new Oshkosh All-Stars franchise. However, Whiting would be swept out of their first and only playoff series by Oshkosh, as the Ciesar All-Americans would play their only home playoff game in the nearby city of Hammond instead due to the Whiting Community Center being held up with other things at the time. Following the season's conclusion, Edward "Eddie" Ciesar would move his team from Whiting to Hammond on a more permanent basis to have them become the Hammond Ciesar All-Americans for the rest of their existence going forward.

This season would be notable for the addition of future (two-time) Naismith Basketball Hall of Famer John Wooden as a player for their team after previously playing for the Indianapolis Kautskys; he would later go on to be one of the most successful basketball coaches of all-time for his tenure with UCLA. In addition to that, Wooden would also be named a member of the All-NBL First Team for being the best player on the Whiting Ciesar All-Americans. Not only that, but Vince McGowan would be named a member of the All-NBL Second Team as well.

== Roster ==
Player	Position
Fred Arndt	F
Ed Campion	G
Marty Cullen	G-F
Ken Gunning	G-F
Bill Haarlow	F
Vince McGowan	C-F
William Perigo	F-C
Joe Sotak	F-C
Joe Stack	G-F
John Wooden	G
Willis Young	C

Interestingly enough, Fred Arndt, Marty Cullen, and Willis Young would only play for the Whiting Ciesar All-Americans during the inaugural NBL Playoffs instead of during both the regular season and the NBL Playoffs.

== Regular season ==
=== Season standings ===
Pos	Western Division	Wins	Losses	Win %
1	Oshkosh All-Stars	12	2	.857
2	Whiting Ciesar All-Americans	12	3	.800
3	Fort Wayne General Electrics	13	7	.650
4	Indianapolis Kautskys	4	9	.308
5	Richmond King Clothiers / Cincinnati Comellos^{‡}	3	7	.300
6	Kankakee Gallagher Trojans	3	11	.214
7	Dayton Metropolitans	2	11	.154
^{‡} Richmond relocated to Cincinnati during the season and assumed Richmond's record in the standings. Richmond's record was 1–2 and Cincinnati's record was 2–5.

=== NBL Schedule ===
An official database created by John Grasso detailing every NBL match possible (outside of two matches that the Kankakee Gallagher Trojans won over the Dayton Metropolitans in 1938) would be released in 2026 showcasing every team's official schedules throughout their time spent in the NBL. As such, these are the official results recorded for the Whiting Ciesar All-Americans in their first (and only) season in the NBL before they moved from Whiting to nearby Hammond, Indiana to become the Hammond Ciesar All-Americans for the rest of their existence going forward.

- November 28, 1937 @ Kankakee, IL: Whiting Ciesar All-Americans 48, Kankakee Gallagher Trojans 32
- December 5, 1937 @ Akron, OH: Whiting Ciesar All-Americans 40, Akron Firestone Non-Skids 40
- December 6, 1937: Whiting Ciesar All-Americans 39, Richmond King Clothiers 38 (OT @ Richmond Civic Auditorium in Richmond, IN)
- December 12, 1937 @ Indianapolis, IN: Whiting Ciesar All-Americans 36, Indianapolis Kautskys 34
- December 16, 1937 @ Fort Wayne, IN: Whiting Ciesar All-Americans 30, Fort Wayne General Electrics 50
- December 18, 1937 @ Akron, OH: Whiting Ciesar All-Americans 28, Akron Goodyear Wingfoots 29
- December 19, 1937 @ Dayton, OH: Whiting Ciesar All-Americans 34, Dayton Metropolitans 38
- January 2, 1938 @ Whiting, IN: Dayton Metropolitans 47, Whiting Ciesar All-Americans 55
- January 9, 1938 @ Whiting, IN: Cincinnati Comellos 43, Whiting Ciesar All-Americans 46
- January 10, 1938: Whiting Ciesar All-Americans 29, Oshkosh All-Stars 26 (OT @ Milwaukee, WI)
- January 16, 1938 @ Whiting, IN: Fort Wayne General Electrics 37, Whiting Ciesar All-Americans 42
- January 23, 1938 @ Whiting, IN: Akron Firestone Non-Skids 40, Whiting Ciesar All-Americans 47
- January 30, 1938 @ Whiting, IN: Kankakee Gallagher Trojans 38, Whiting Ciesar All-Americans 61
- February 6, 1938: Oshkosh All-Stars 39, Whiting Ciesar All-Americans 42 (2OT @ Whiting, IN)
- February 20, 1938 @ Hammond, Indiana: Indianapolis Kautskys 37, Whiting Ciesar All-Americans 38

== NBL Playoffs ==
=== NBL Western Division Playoff ===
(2W) Whiting Ciesar All-Americans vs. (1W) Oshkosh All-Stars: Oshkosh wins series 2–0

- Game 1: February 22, 1938 @ Hammond, Indiana (Whiting): Oshkosh 40, Whiting 33
- Game 2: February 27, 1938 @ Oshkosh: Oshkosh 41, Whiting 38

== Awards and honors ==
- First Team All-NBL – John Wooden
- Second Team All-NBL – Vince McGowan
