= Indianapolis Boulevard =

Roadway in Illinois and Indiana

- Indianapolis Avenue; 6000 East
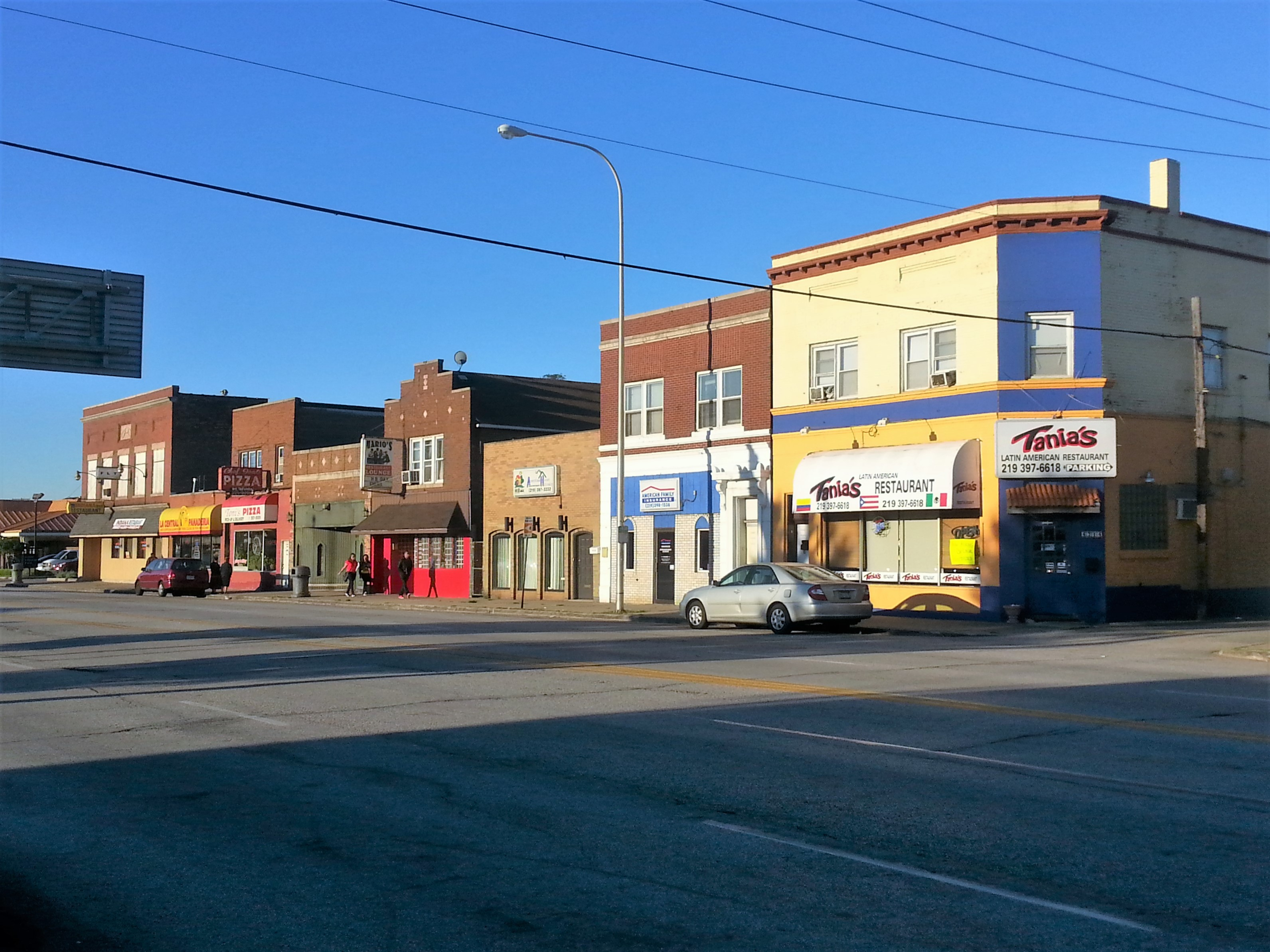
- Indianapolis Boulevard in East Chicago, Indiana
- Part of: US 12 / LMCT from East Chicago, IN to Chicago, IL; US 20 from the Hammond, IN–East Chicago, IN line to Chicago, IL; US 41 from Schererville, IN to Hammond, IN, and from Hammond, IN to Chicago, IL; SR 152 in Hammond, IN
- Namesake: Indianapolis, Indiana
- Maintained by: IDOT, INDOT, and local city jurisdictions
- Length: 16.5 mi (26.6 km)
- Location: Schererville, Indiana–Chicago, Illinois, United States
- Southeast end: US 30 / Lincoln Highway in Schererville, IN
- Major junctions: I-80 / I-94 / US 6 / US 41 in Hammond, IN; US 41 in Hammond, IN; I-90 Toll / Indiana Toll Road in Hammond, IN; I-90 Toll / Chicago Skyway in Chicago, IL
- Northwest end: Avenue L / 100th Street in Chicago, IL

Indianapolis Boulevard, also known as Indianapolis Avenue, is a major arterial road in Illinois and Indiana, serving the southeastern suburbs of Chicago. It serves US 12, US 20, US 41, and Indiana State Road 152 (SR 152) for portions of its length.

== Route description ==
The route starts in Schererville, Indiana with a junction on US 30 and the Lincoln Highway. From the beginning, Indianapolis Boulevard is part of US 41. After an intersection with Ridge Road in Highland, Indianapolis Boulevard crosses a major interchange at the Frank Borman Expressway (Interstate 80/Interstate 94/US 6). US 41 merges onto the freeway, but the road continues as SR 152.

On the East Chicago-Hammond line, US 20 merges onto Indianapolis Boulevard, ending SR 152. After an intersection with SR 312, Indianapolis Boulevard meets US 12 and the Lake Michigan Circle Tour (LMCT). Both become a part of Indianapolis Boulevard along with US 20. Later on, US 41 rejoins Indianapolis Boulevard, and the route has an interchange with the Indiana Toll Road (I-90) before crossing into Illinois.

After another interchange with I-90, now the Chicago Skyway, all three U.S. Routes and the LMCT end their concurrency with Indianapolis Boulevard, turning north towards Ewing Avenue. Indianapolis Boulevard itself ends on Avenue L, with the roadway continuing as 100th Street.

Between the two states, the total length of the route is 16.5 miles (26.6 km).

== Communities and sites ==
Indianapolis Boulevard serves the southeastern suburbs of Chicago, including Hammond, Whiting, East Chicago, Highland, and Schererville.

The Whiting Refinery, an oil refinery operated by BP, is located on the eastern side of Indianapolis Boulevard and the Indiana Harbor and Ship Canal.

One of the campuses of Purdue University Northwest is in Hammond, covering 167 acres (68 ha), and bordering Indianapolis Boulevard to the east. The campus includes 17 academic buildings, a fitness center, two student housing facilities, the White Lodging Center for Hospitality and Tourism Management, and a Challenger Learning Center. It was established in 1946, and the $35 million Nils K. Nelson Bioscience Innovation Building was opened in August 2020, situated in the Hammond campus.

== Transportation ==
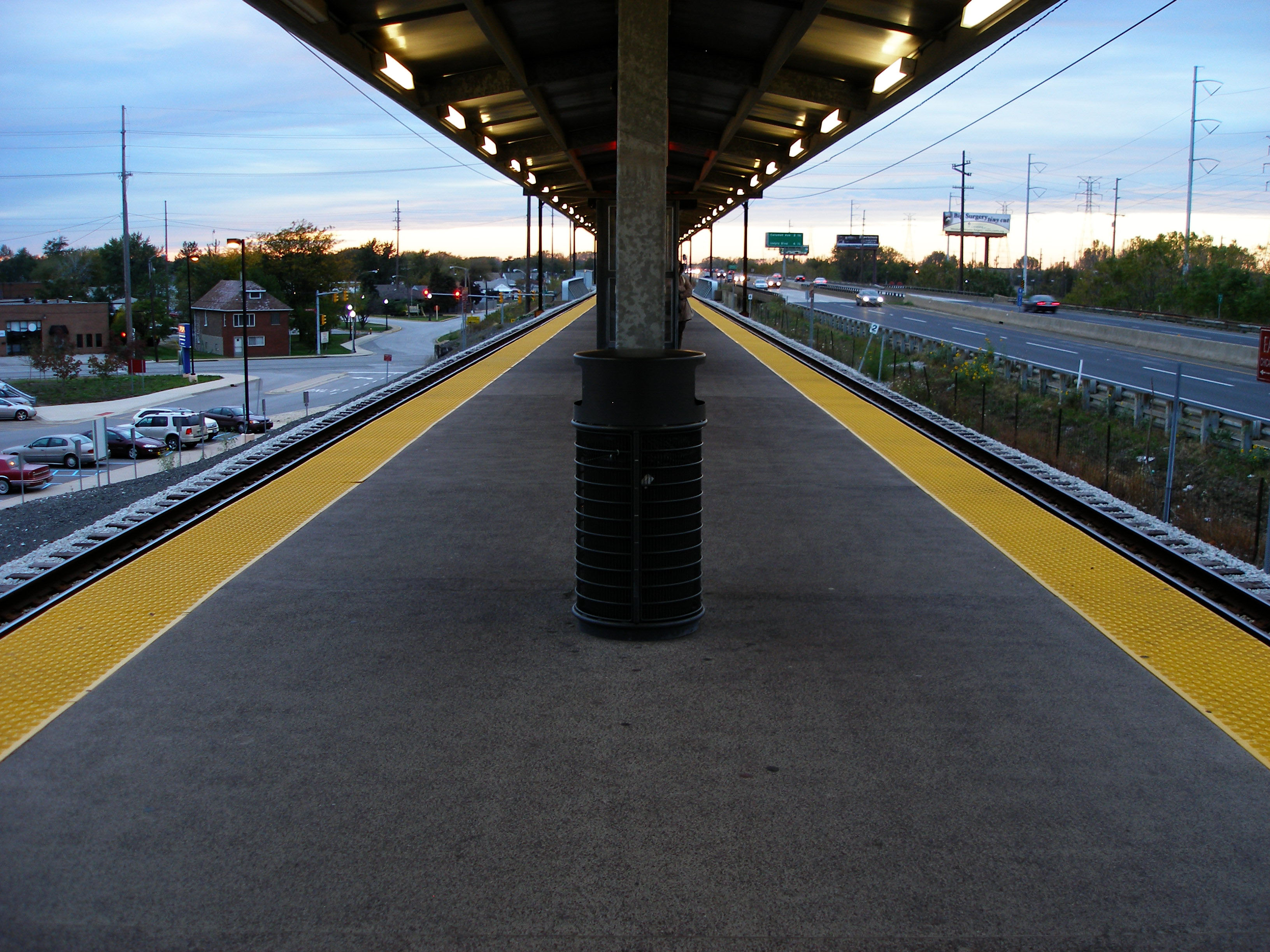
East Chicago station on Indianapolis Boulevard in East Chicago, Indiana, serving the South Shore Line (NICTD)

The South Shore Line (NICTD) is the main commuter rail line on Indianapolis Boulevard, with a station in East Chicago at 5615 Indianapolis Boulevard. This station opened in 1956 and was remodeled in 2004.

The Hammond–Whiting station, an Amtrak intercity train station, is another one close by, along the former Pennsylvania Railroad Fort Wayne Line.

There are also many bus stops along the route's major intersections, such as Ridge Road, Chicago Avenue (SR 312), and Calumet Avenue (US 41).

== Major intersections ==
State	County	Location	mi	km	Destinations	Notes
Indiana	Lake	Schererville	0.0	0.0	US 30 (Joliet Street) / US 41 south (Wicker Avenue) / Lincoln Highway	Southern terminus, southern end of US 41 concurrency
Indiana	Lake	Hammond	5.9	9.5	I-80 / I-94 / US 6 / US 41 west (Frank Borman Expressway) / SR 152 begins – Chicago, Toledo, Detroit	Northern end of US 41 concurrency; southern end of SR 152 concurrency; I-80/I-94/US 6 exit 2
Indiana	Lake	Hammond–East Chicago line	8.4	13.5	US 20 east (Michigan Street) / SR 152 ends	Northern end of SR 152 concurrency; southern end of US 20 concurrency
Indiana	Lake	East Chicago	9.7	15.6	SR 312 (Chicago Avenue)	
Indiana	Lake	East Chicago	10.4	16.7	US 12 east (Columbus Drive) / LMCT east	Southern end of US 12/LMCT concurrency
Indiana	Lake	Hammond	14.2	22.9	US 41 south (Calumet Avenue)	Southern end of US 41 concurrency
Indiana	Lake	Hammond	15.2	24.5	I-90 Toll / Indiana Toll Road – Chicago	I-90 exit 0
			15.6	25.1	Indiana–Illinois state line	
Illinois	Cook	Chicago	15.7	25.3	I-90 Toll / Chicago Skyway – Rockford	I-90 exit 107
Illinois	Cook	Chicago	16.4	26.4	US 12 west / US 20 west / US 41 north / LMCT north	Northern end of US 12/US 20/US 41/LMCT concurrency
Illinois	Cook	Chicago	16.5	26.6	Avenue L, 100th Street	Northwestern terminus, continues as 100th Street
1.000 mi = 1.609 km; 1.000 km = 0.621 mi: Concurrency terminus; Tolled
