= 1937–38 Oshkosh All-Stars season =

NBL professional basketball team season

- Division champions
- Head coach: George Hotchkiss
- General manager: Lon Darling
- Owner: Lon Darling
- Arena: South Park School Gymnasium

Results
- Record: 12–2 (.857)
- Place: Division: 1st (Western)
- Playoff finish: Lost NBL Championship to Akron Goodyear Wingfoots, 2–1

The 1937–38 Oshkosh All-Stars season was the All-Stars' first professional year in the United States' National Basketball League (NBL), which was also the first ever year the league existed as a professional basketball league. However, if one were to include the independent seasons they played starting all the way back in 1929 when they started out as a barnstorming team owned by a seed distributor and salesman traveling all throughout the state of Wisconsin before eventually beginning to join the NBL in December 1937 as the last inaugural NBL team to enter the new league after the Richmond King Clothiers (later known as the Cincinnati Comellos) and Kankakee Gallagher Trojans first joined a month earlier in November, this would officially be their eighth season of play instead. Not only that, but they also entered this season as self-proclaimed world champions after winning a best-of-seven championship series against the all-black New York Renaissance in their previous season of play. While they were technically considered an official team to enter the NBL by November 1937 alongside the other two new teams entering the NBL's inaugural season under its new name, they would not officially join the league until a month later in December 1937, with their first game there not being officially played until early January 1938 (specifically by New Year's Day against the Dayton Metropolitans). The All-Stars played their home games at the South Park School Gymnasium in the South Park Middle School within the Oshkosh Area School District.

Despite their entry into the NBL being a bit later than the rest of the league would have liked to see on their ends due to how many exhibition games they would play throughout the season (when including their exhibition games played, their official record for the season before playing in the NBL Playoffs this season would be 62–12, with their overall record in a three-year period before entering the NBL Playoffs being 116–24 for a .829 win percentage), the Oshkosh All-Stars would end up becoming the best team in the league for at least the regular season due to the team living up to their franchise name and quality of play for that era by finishing the inaugural NBL season with a 12–2 record, with their only two losses coming in overtime losses against the Whiting Ciesar All-Americans. While Oshkosh would only lose twice in the NBL's regular season to the Whiting Ciesar All-Americans, the All-Stars would get their revenge on the All-Americans in the NBL Playoffs by sweeping them in the Western Division Playoffs. Unfortunately for them, the All-Stars would get upset by the Akron Goodyear Wingfoots works team 2–1, which avoided Oshkosh being named the NBL's champions during the league's inaugural season under that name in spite of the All-Stars' late entry into the NBL (though they would still proclaim the honor of "Western Professional Champions" for the season).

This season would also be the first of three straight seasons where Leroy Edwards would be named the NBL's MVP (which related to him also having three straight seasons where he led the NBL in scoring), as well as the first of six seasons (five straight in a row) where he would be named a member of the All-NBL First Team. It would also be his first of many seasons (outside of some exhibition games in their previous two seasons as a barnstorming franchise) where Leroy Edwards would play with the Oshkosh All-Stars in the NBL.

== Roster ==
1937–38 Oshkosh All-Stars roster
Players

Pos.	No.	Player	Height	Weight	DOB	From
F/C		Ray Adams	6 ft 2 in (1.88 m)	185 lb (84 kg)	1912–09–28	DePaul
C		Leroy Edwards	6 ft 5 in (1.96 m)	210 lb (95 kg)	1914–04–11	Kentucky
G/F		Ray Hamann	6 ft 4 in (1.93 m)	205 lb (93 kg)	1911–08–19	Wisconsin
G		Frank Linskey	6 ft 2 in (1.88 m)	180 lb (82 kg)	1913–08–18	DePaul
G		Ed Mullen	6 ft 3 in (1.91 m)	185 lb (84 kg)	1914–03–09	Marquette
F		Pete Preboske	6 ft 1 in (1.85 m)	195 lb (88 kg)	1914–01–21	Wisconsin
F/C		Ed Stege	6 ft 6 in (1.98 m)	220 lb (100 kg)	1913–09–04	Wisconsin
F/C		George Svendsen	6 ft 4 in (1.93 m)	230 lb (104 kg)	1913–03–22	Minnesota
C		Augie Vander Meulen	6 ft 4 in (1.93 m)	175 lb (79 kg)	1909–11–06	Carroll College
G/F		Herm Witasek	6 ft 2 in (1.88 m)	210 lb (95 kg)	1913–10–16	North Dakota

Coaches
Head coach
- George Hotchkiss

Legend
- (DP) Unsigned draft pick
- (FA) Free agent
- (S) Suspended
- Injured

Roster

Note: Ed Stege was not on the playoff roster.

== Regular season ==
=== Season standings ===
Pos	Western Division	Wins	Losses	Win %
1	Oshkosh All-Stars	12	2	.857
2	Whiting Ciesar All-Americans	12	3	.800
3	Fort Wayne General Electrics	13	7	.650
4	Indianapolis Kautskys	4	9	.308
5	Richmond King Clothiers / Cincinnati Comellos^{‡}	3	7	.300
6	Kankakee Gallagher Trojans	3	11	.214
7	Dayton Metropolitans	2	11	.154
^{‡} Richmond relocated to Cincinnati during the season and assumed Richmond's record in the standings. Richmond's record was 1–2 and Cincinnati's record was 2–5.

=== NBL Schedule ===
Due to Oshkosh being a rather late entry to the NBL and then playing exhibition games against other teams first for the rest of 1937, they would not officially play their first NBL game of the season until 1938.

- January 1, 1938 @ Oshkosh, WI: Dayton Metropolitans 43, Oshkosh All-Stars 44
- January 4, 1938 @ Oshkosh, WI: Kankakee Gallagher Trojans 42, Oshkosh All-Stars 75
- January 10, 1938: Whiting Ciesar All-Americans 29, Oshkosh All-Stars 26 (OT @ Milwaukee, WI)
- January 29, 1938 (Game 1 @ Oshkosh, WI): Cincinnati Comellos 26, Oshkosh All-Stars 43
- January 29, 1938 (Game 2 @ Oshkosh, WI): Cincinnati Comellos 15, Oshkosh All-Stars 42
- February 2, 1938 @ Kankakee, IL: Oshkosh All-Stars 68, Kankakee Gallagher Trojans 35
- February 6, 1938: Oshkosh All-Stars 39, Whiting Ciesar All-Americans 42 (2OT @ Whiting, IN)
- February 7, 1938 @ Plainfield, WI: Kankakee Gallagher Trojans 40, Oshkosh All-Stars 56
- February 8, 1938 @ Oshkosh, WI: Kankakee Gallagher Trojans 33, Oshkosh All-Stars 58
- February 10, 1938 @ Fort Wayne, IN: Oshkosh All-Stars 33, Fort Wayne General Electrics 30
- February 11, 1938 @ Oshkosh, WI: Akron Goodyear Wingfoots 29, Oshkosh All-Stars 39
- February 12, 1938 @ Oshkosh, WI: Indianapolis Kautskys 39, Oshkosh All-Stars 52
- February 13, 1938 @ Menasha, WI: Indianapolis Kautskys 46, Oshkosh All-Stars 48
- February 19, 1938 @ Oshkosh, WI: Fort Wayne General Electrics 38, Oshkosh All-Stars 54

== NBL Playoffs ==
=== NBL Western Division Playoff ===
(1W) Oshkosh All-Stars vs. (2W) Whiting Ciesar All-Americans: Oshkosh wins series 2–0

- Game 1: February 22, 1938 @ Hammond, Indiana (Whiting): Oshkosh 40, Whiting 33
- Game 2: February 27, 1938 @ Oshkosh: Oshkosh 41, Whiting 38

=== NBL Championship ===
(1W) Oshkosh All-Stars vs. (2E) Akron Goodyear Wingfoots: Akron win series 2–1

- Game 1: February 28, 1938 @ Oshkosh: Akron 29, Oshkosh 28
- Game 2: March 3, 1938 @ Akron: Oshkosh 39, Akron 31
- Game 3: March 4, 1938 @ Akron: Akron 35, Oshkosh 27

=== Awards and honors ===
- NBL scoring leader – Leroy Edwards
- NBL Most Valuable Player – Leroy Edwards
- All-NBL First Team – Leroy Edwards
- NBL All-Time Team – Leroy Edwards
