= Donald Walsh =

Donald or Don Walsh may refer to:

- A. D. Walsh (known as Donald Walsh; 1916–1977), British chemist
- E. Donald Walsh (1917–1997), American major general
- Don Walsh (1931–2023), American oceanographer, explorer and marine policy specialist
- Don Walsh (basketball), American basketball player
- Don Walsh (Canadian football) (1932–2006), Canadian football player
- Don Walsh (footballer) (1934–2016), Australian rules footballer
- Donnie Walsh (born 1941), basketball consultant

== See also ==
- Donal Walsh
