= 1937–38 Indianapolis Kautskys season =

NBL professional basketball team season

- Head coach: Frank Kautsky
- General manager: Frank Kautsky
- Owner(s): Frank Kautsky; Pete Bailey
- Arena: Butler Fieldhouse

Results
- Record: 4–9 (.308)
- Place: Division: 4th (Western)
- Playoff finish: Did not qualify

The 1937–38 Indianapolis Kautskys season was the first professional basketball season of play that the Kautskys franchise would not only utilize that name for their team, but also played in the United States' National Basketball League (NBL), which was also the very first year the league existed under that name after previously spending its first two seasons of existence as the semi-pro or amateur-based Midwest Basketball Conference. However, if you include their previous three seasons where they played in predecessor leagues of sorts in the National Professional Basketball League and the Midwest Basketball Conference, as well as the couple of independent seasons they had in their history, then this would actually be their fifth season of play as the Kautskys before starting their first-ever season in the NBL. The Kautskys would join the Akron Firestone Non-Skids, Dayton Metropolitans, and the Pittsburgh Y.M.H.A. team turned Pittsburgh Pirates NBL team as the only four MBC teams that played both seasons in that original league in question before moving on up into the NBL. However, there is a notion that the Kautskys would merge with another MBC team that was hosted in Indianapolis at the time in the inner city rivaling Indianapolis U.S. Tires (which were owned by the U.S. Tire Company, Inc. at the time) in order to both retain their Kautskys history and survive for the long-term as a professional basketball franchise. They would also be the only team from the days of the MBC (and by extension, the National Professional Basketball League precursor) to end up being promoted to what would become the modern-day National Basketball Association (NBA), thus granting those two precursor leagues a sense of being tied toward the NBA's larger history, similar to how the original Baltimore Bullets franchise gave the original ABL a sense of being tied toward the NBA's larger history as well. This season would see the most teams that the NBL would ever have in one season with 13 teams at hand, with six teams in the Eastern Division and seven teams in the Western Division (including the Kautskys), but the structure of the regular season would prove to be very loose in nature, with only one team in the Fort Wayne General Electrics ultimately meeting the original goal of the 20 regular season games played idea, as playoff teams looked to reach at least 13 overall games played instead of the natural 20 games played.

Due to their status as one of the founding teams of this league, the Kautskys would debut the inaugural NBL season on November 27, 1937, with a blowout 53–20 defeat against the Akron Firestone Non-Skids, who were the other team who had ownership help create the NBL throughout its existence. Despite being misconstrued in at least one official publication of having a forfeited match during their history in the NBL, the Kautskys would still end up finishing their NBL season with a 4–9 record; while it would be the best record out of the losing teams within their division, it would be nowhere near close enough to qualify for the NBL Playoffs this season over the other three teams with winning records in their division (the aforementioned Fort Wayne General Electrics, the Whiting Ciesar All-Americans, and the Oshkosh All-Stars). Despite the losing record they had, they would not only have a Rookie of the Year winner, but also an All-NBL Second Team member in Robert Kessler, with Kessler being the only member from a losing team this season to join either one of the inaugural All-NBL teams that the NBL announced. Because of their established history and Frank Kautsky's previous success with the Indianapolis Kautskys franchise up until this point in time, the Kautskys franchise would be one of the seven NBL teams to continue playing in the NBL for its upcoming season.

== Roster ==
1937–38 Indianapolis Kautskys roster
Players

Pos.	No.	Player	Height	Weight	DOB	From
G/F		Frank Baird	5 ft 11 in (1.80 m)	160 lb (73 kg)	1912–04–10	Butler
F/C		George Chestnut	6 ft 5 in (1.96 m)	210 lb (95 kg)	1911–09–27	Indiana State
G		Leo Crowe	5 ft 11 in (1.80 m)	170 lb (77 kg)	1912–04–02	Notre Dame
C		Fred Fechtman	6 ft 8 in (2.03 m)	210 lb (95 kg)	1910–08–10	Indiana
G/F		Robert Kessler	6 ft 0 in (1.83 m)	165 lb (75 kg)	1914–11–25	Purdue
F		Cy Proffitt	6 ft 3 in (1.91 m)	190 lb (86 kg)	1911–10–26	Butler
C		Bill Schrader	6 ft 7 in (2.01 m)	210 lb (95 kg)	1910–05–14	Notre Dame
G/F		Everett Swank	5 ft 11 in (1.80 m)	165 lb (75 kg)	1913–02–17	Indianapolis
G		Harlan Wilson	5 ft 11 in (1.80 m)	160 lb (73 kg)	1914–02–03	Central (IN)

Coaches
Head coach
- Frank Kautsky

Legend
- (DP) Unsigned draft pick
- (FA) Free agent
- (S) Suspended
- Injured

Roster

== Regular season ==
=== Season standings ===
Pos	Western Division	Wins	Losses	Win %
1	Oshkosh All-Stars	12	2	.857
2	Whiting Ciesar All-Americans	12	3	.800
3	Fort Wayne General Electrics	13	7	.650
4	Indianapolis Kautskys	4	9	.308
5	Richmond King Clothiers / Cincinnati Comellos^{‡}	3	7	.300
6	Kankakee Gallagher Trojans	3	11	.214
7	Dayton Metropolitans	2	11	.154
^{‡} Richmond relocated to Cincinnati during the season and assumed Richmond's record in the standings. Richmond's record was 1–2 and Cincinnati's record was 2–5.

=== NBL Schedule ===
- November 27, 1937 @ Akron, OH: Indianapolis Kautskys 20, Akron Firestone Non-Skids 53 (Inaugural game played to start out the existence of the NBL.)
- December 5, 1937 @ Fort Wayne, IN: Indianapolis Kautskys 41, Fort Wayne General Electrics 31
- December 12, 1937 @ Indianapolis, IN: Whiting Ciesar All-Americans 36, Indianapolis Kautskys 34
- December 19, 1937 @ Akron, OH: Indianapolis Kautskys 33, Akron Firestone Non-Skids 46
- December 28, 1937 @ Kankakee, IL: Indianapolis Kautskys 31, Akron Goodyear Wingfoots 34
- December 29, 1937: Indianapolis Kautskys 38, Pittsburgh Pirates 39 (OT @ Pittsburgh, Pennsylvania)
- January 6, 1938 @ Fort Wayne, IN: Indianapolis Kautskys 31, Fort Wayne General Electrics 32
- January 9, 1938 @ Indianapolis, IN: Pittsburgh Pirates 27, Indianapolis Kautskys 35
- January 16, 1938 @ Indianapolis, IN: Akron Goodyear Wingfoots 31, Indianapolis Kautskys 33
- January 30, 1938 @ Indianapolis, IN: Cincinnati Comellos 23, Indianapolis Kautskys 55
- February 12, 1938 @ Oshkosh, WI: Indianapolis Kautskys 39, Oshkosh All-Stars 52
- February 13, 1938 @ Menasha, WI: Indianapolis Kautskys 46, Oshkosh All-Stars 48
- February 20, 1938 @ Hammond, Indiana: Indianapolis Kautskys 37, Whiting Ciesar All-Americans 38

== Awards and honors ==
- Second Team All-NBL – Robert Kessler
- NBL Rookie of the Year – Robert Kessler
