= Centier Bank =

American community bank in Indiana

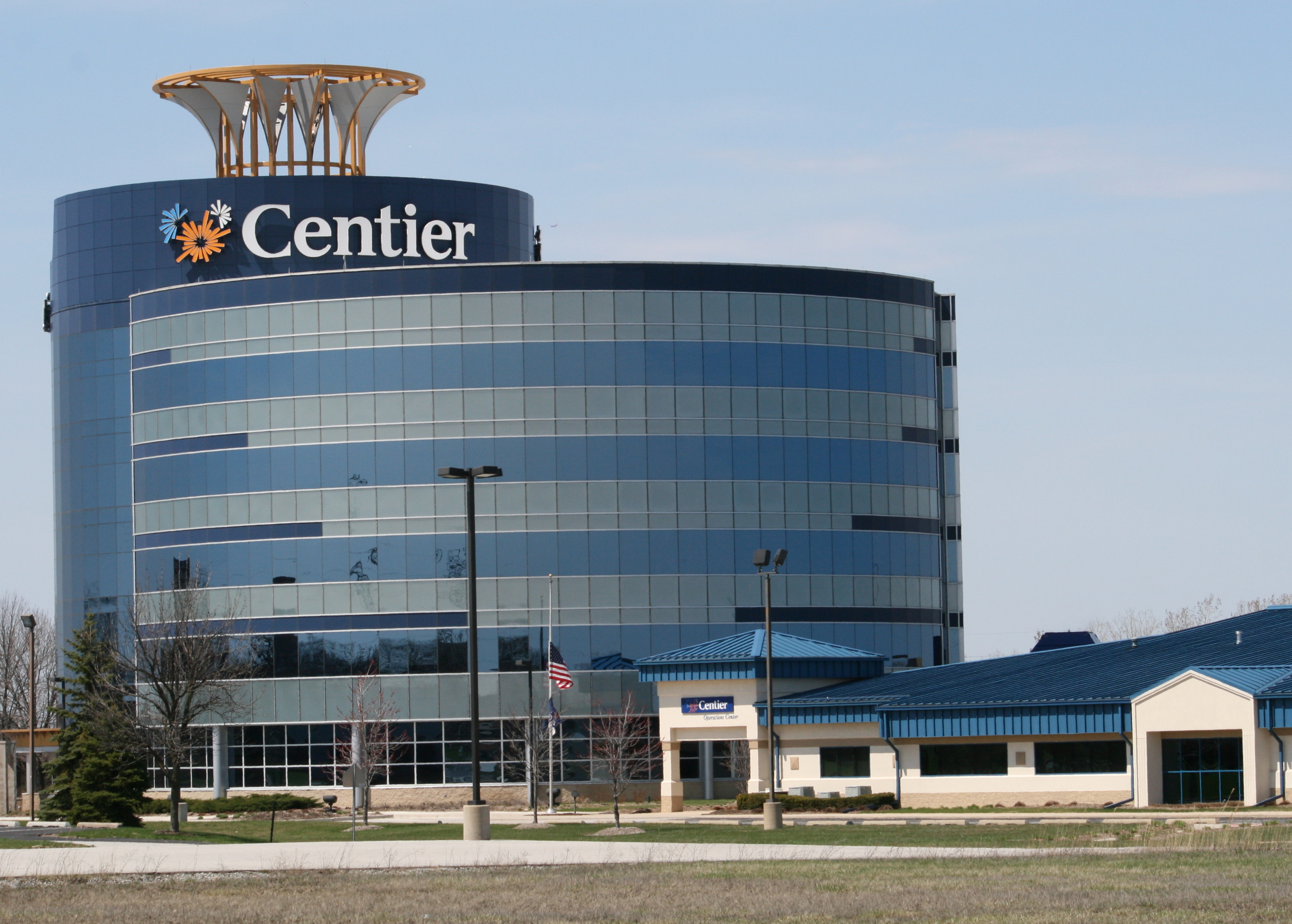
- Centier Bank headquarters in Merrillville, Indiana
- Formerly: Bank of Whiting (1895–1960); First Bank of Whiting (1960–1999)
- Type: Private
- Industry: Banking
- Founded: April 21, 1895; 131 years ago Whiting, Indiana, United States of America
- Founder: Henry Schrage, Sr.
- Headquarters: 600 East 84th Avenue, Merrillville, Indiana, United States of America
- Number of locations: 61 (branches); 68 (ATMs) (2026)
- Area served: Northern and central Indiana
- Net income: ▲$1.56 million (2025, consolidated)
- Total assets: ▲$9.74 billion (2025, consolidated)
- Total equity: ▲$9.86 million (2025, consolidated)
- Owner: Schrage Family
- Number of employees: 1,071 (June 2026)
- Parent: First Bancshares, Inc.
- Subsidiaries: Centier Nevada 2, LLC; Centier Investments Nevada 2, Inc. Centier Holdings Nevada 2, Inc.
- Capital ratio: 10.5%
- Rating: A (Edgar-Jones)
- Website: www.centier.com

Centier Bank is a community bank, headquartered in Merrillville, Indiana. Centier was originally founded in Whiting, Indiana as The Bank of Whiting on April 21, 1895, by Henry Schrage Sr. The company operates 61 branches and 68 ATMs across northern and central Indiana.

== History ==
Centier Bank was opened as the Bank of Whiting by Henry Schrage Sr. on April 21, 1895, at 1738 119th Street, Whiting, Indiana with $35,000 in capital and $5,600 in deposits. The bank moved to its current location at 1500 119th Street in 1910. By 1917, Henry Sr. had stepped back but remained active as a chairman; his son, Walter Schrage Sr., had taken over the bank presidency. When Henry Sr. died in 1932, Walter, who was still bank president, took on the chairman position until his own death in 1940. As a result, Walter's son, Walter "Wally" Schrage Jr., became president of the bank.

In 1960, the bank changed their name to First Bank of Whiting to differentiate between it and the State Bank of Whiting that opened in 1931. The first branch location opened in Highland, Indiana in 1963. Wally's son, Michael "Mike" Schrage, had joined the bank after convincing his father to open another location. Following Mike's onboarding, the second branch was opened Dyer, Indiana in 1973. The bank continued to expand by opening the Schererville branch in 1975 and the Griffith branch in 1976. First Bank of Whiting created their trust department in 1975. By 1976, the bank dropped "of Whiting" from its name as its operations had moved into other communities. In 1977, Mike became president, while Wally remained active as chairman. In 1980, Mike formed a holding company, First Bancshares, Inc., to allow further locations to open. In 1982, Mike had acquired First National Bank in Crown Point and Southlake National Bank in Lowell.

In 1984, First Bank was under threat of closure after a senior lender in Chicago had purposefully taken out bad loans to set the bank up for purchase. The bank decided to raise all interest rates and reduce deposit fees; shareholders and the FDIC agreed to this, and the bank ultimately survived after many concerned shareholders had sold back their shares.

In 1991, First Bank changed their name to Centier Bank to grow their marketing, represent their then-upcoming centennial anniversary, and to represent their customer centered vision. Following the change in branding and recovery from the Chicago loans, Centier began to expand once again. The first locations in Porter County opened in Valparaiso in 1988 and 1989, and two Chesterton branches were acquired in 1992. In 1991, Centier began to open in-store locations. In 1999, Centier launched the "Not for Sale" motto as mergers began buying up local community banks.

== Controversies ==
In October 2006, the United States Department of Justice filed a lawsuit alleging that Centier Bank had violated the Fair Housing Act and the Equal Credit Opportunity Act by failing provide services to communities with a mostly African American and/or Hispanic population, an act known as redlining. On October 16, 2006, both parties and the court reached a settlement, under which Centier agreed to open new branches in Gary, East Chicago, and Hammond, Indiana. Centier also agreed to direct funds toward special financing programs and consumer financial education for consumers in those branch areas. In January 2010, both parties and the court agreed to amend the 2006 order, allowing Centier to close the operating Hammond branch location to open a full-service stand-alone Hammond location by April 2011.

== Awards and recognitions ==
In 2007, Centier Bank began participating in the Best Places to Work program organized by the Indiana Chamber of Commerce. Centier ranked number one in 2010 and had ranked every year for thirteen years; Centier achieved Best Places to Work Hall of Fame status as a result in 2019. In 2014, American Banker ranked Centier as the 17th best bank to work for in the country; that ranking rose to number six in 2019. In 2018, Forbes created the Best In-State Banks list for each state, which Centier was among the top five in Indiana, and in 2019, Centier had topped that list. In 2025, J.D. Power ranked Centier number one in customer satisfaction among retail banks in its North Central region. In 2026, Centier Bank won the IBA Commitment to Community Award in the large banks category.

In 2019, Culver Academy broke ground for the Schrage Leadership Center, which has classrooms, meeting spaces, and an auditorium.

== Philanthropy ==
The Schrage Family Scholarship Foundation was created in 1995. In 2009, Mike Schrage contributed $100,000 to the City of Whiting for the overall $400,000 needed to repair the Schrage Family Mansion built by his great-grandfather in 1897. In 2011, Mike and his wife, Jill, established an endowment for the Culver Academy drill team and contributed to the renovation of the their equestrian center stables. In 2017, Mike and Jill pledged $1.5 million of both personal and bank money to the creation of the Southlake YMCA in Crown Point. In 2019, $250,000 were donated to the Mascot Hall of Fame in Whiting ahead of their grand opening. The Schrage Family/Centier Bank also contributes to financial literacy programs in schools and community centers. Centier established the Centier Associates Reaching out to Everyone (CARE) Program to provide financial relief to employees in times of need. In 2020, Mike and Jill gifted $1 million to CARE.
