= Robertsdale =

Robertsdale may refer to:

- Robertsdale, Alabama
- Robertsdale, Pennsylvania
- Robertsdale Historic District
- Robertsdale (Hammond)
- Robertsdale High School
