= Robertsdale (Hammond) =

- Neighborhood
- Interactive map of Robertsdale
- Coordinates: 41°41′28″N 87°30′50″W
- Country: United States
- State: Indiana
- County: Lake County
- City: Hammond
- Time zone: UTC-6 (CST)
  - Summer (DST): UTC-5 (CDT)
- ZIP code: 46394
- Area code: 219

Robertsdale is a neighborhood in northernmost Hammond, Indiana, north of 129th Street and south of Lake Michigan. It is bounded to the south by Pulaski Park, to the west by the Chicago neighborhood of East Side, to the north by Lake Michigan, and to the east by the cities of Whiting and East Chicago. The neighborhood's boundaries correspond to Hammond's Planning District I. The neighborhood is traversed by the Indiana Toll Road, which has an exit into the neighborhood at the Indianapolis Boulevard immediately east of the state line. Amtrak passenger trains pass through Hammond-Whiting station in the neighborhood.

View across Wolf Lake

The Whiting post office (46394) serves not only the city of Whiting but also this adjacent neighborhood in Hammond. Robertsdale and Whiting are "inextricably linked", sharing for example a single chamber of commerce. In the early 20th century, Whiting and Robertsdale shared a common ethnic composition: nearly 90% Slavic and 50% Slovak. The economies of both Whiting and Robertsdale have historically been dominated by the Whiting Refinery, originally built by Standard Oil and now operated by BP.

== History ==
The portion of the neighborhood near the northern tip of Wolf Lake corresponds to the former town of Roby. The name "Roby" continued long after the town was absorbed into Hammond, and the area was known in the early 20th century as a criminal haven. The Roby Speedway, a popular automotive racetrack, operated in the area from 1920 to 1936.

== Geography ==
Robertsdale's geography is dominated by bodies of water: Wolf Lake and Lake George, largely surrounded by parkland, take up much of the neighborhood's southern half. The remainder of the neighborhood is divided between industrial uses north of Wolf Lake and residential uses to the east of Wolf Lake. Commercial corridors run along the Calumet Avenue and Indianapolis Boulevard arteries. Local attractions include the Horseshoe Hammond casino, on the Lake Michigan shore.
