= Bill Schrader =

American basketball player

Personal information
- Born: May 14, 1910 Lafayette, Indiana, U.S.
- Died: October 1, 1968 (aged 58)
- Listed height: 6 ft 7 in (2.01 m)
- Listed weight: 210 lb (95 kg)

Career information
- College: Notre Dame (1930–1933)
- Position: Center

Career history
- 1937–1938: Indianapolis Kautskys

William James Schrader (May 14, 1910 – October 1968) was an American professional basketball player. He played college basketball at the University of Notre Dame and played in the National Basketball League for the Indianapolis Kautskys for eight games during the 1937–38 season. He married Rosemary Louise Carey on November 10, 1937, and had at least one daughter, Julia (born c. 1939). He died in October 1968.

== Career statistics ==
Legend
GP	Games played	FGM	Field goals made
FTM	Free throws made	FTA	Free throws attempted
FT%	Free throw percentage	PTS	Total points
PPG	Points per game	**Bold**	Career high

=== NBL ===
==== Regular season ====
Year	Team	GP	FGM	FTM	PTS	PPG
1937–38	Indianapolis	8	6	2	14	1.8
