= Jim Logan (American football) =

American football player (1916–2004)

No. 20
- Position: Guard

Personal information
- Born: December 22, 1916; Richmond, Indiana, U.S.
- Died: March 27, 2004 (aged 87); Richmond, Indiana, U.S.
- Listed height: 5 ft 10 in (1.78 m)
- Listed weight: 190 lb (86 kg)

Career information
- High school: Morton (Richmond, Indiana)
- College: Indiana (1936–1939)

Career history
- Chicago Bears (1943)

Awards and highlights
- NFL champion (1943)
- Stats at Pro Football Reference

James Zimmerman Logan (December 22, 1916 – March 27, 2004) was an American professional football guard who played one season with the Chicago Bears of the National Football League (NFL). He played college football at Indiana University Bloomington.

== Early life and college ==
James Zimmerman Logan was born on December 22, 1916, in Richmond, Indiana. He attended Morton High School in Richmond.

He was a member of the Indiana Hoosiers of the Indiana University Bloomington from 1936 to 1939 and a three-year letterman from 1937 to 1939. He served in the United States Navy during World War II.

== Professional career ==
Logan signed with the Chicago Bears of the National Football League in 1943. He played in nine games, starting one, for the Bears during the 1943 season, returning one kick for two yards. He also appeared in the 1943 NFL Championship Game, a 41–21 victory over the Washington Redskins.

== Personal life ==
Logan died on March 27, 2004, in Richmond, Indiana.
