= Henry and Caroline Schrage House =

Historic location in Lake County, Indiana

- U.S. National Register of Historic Places
- The Henry and Caroline Schrage House in 2026

- Location within Indiana Location within the United States
- Location: 2006 Schrage Avenue, Whiting, Indiana
- Coordinates: 41°40′34″N 87°29′26″W
- Area: Less than 1 acre (0.40 ha)
- Built: 1897
- Built by: Henry Schrage
- Architectural style: Queen Anne and Romanesque styles
- NRHP reference No.: 100006562
- Added to NRHP: 2021

The Henry and Caroline Schrage House, also known as the Schrage Mansion, is a historic structure located in Whiting, Indiana. It was built by Henry Schrage, a German immigrant, Union Civil War veteran, and a settler of Whiting's Station. Schrage founded numerous businesses in Whiting, including the Bank of Whiting, today known as Centier Bank. It is listed on the National Register of Historic Places (100006562).

== See also ==
- National Register of Historic Places listings in Indiana
- National Register of Historic Places listings in Lake County, Indiana
