= Richmond High School (Richmond, Indiana) =

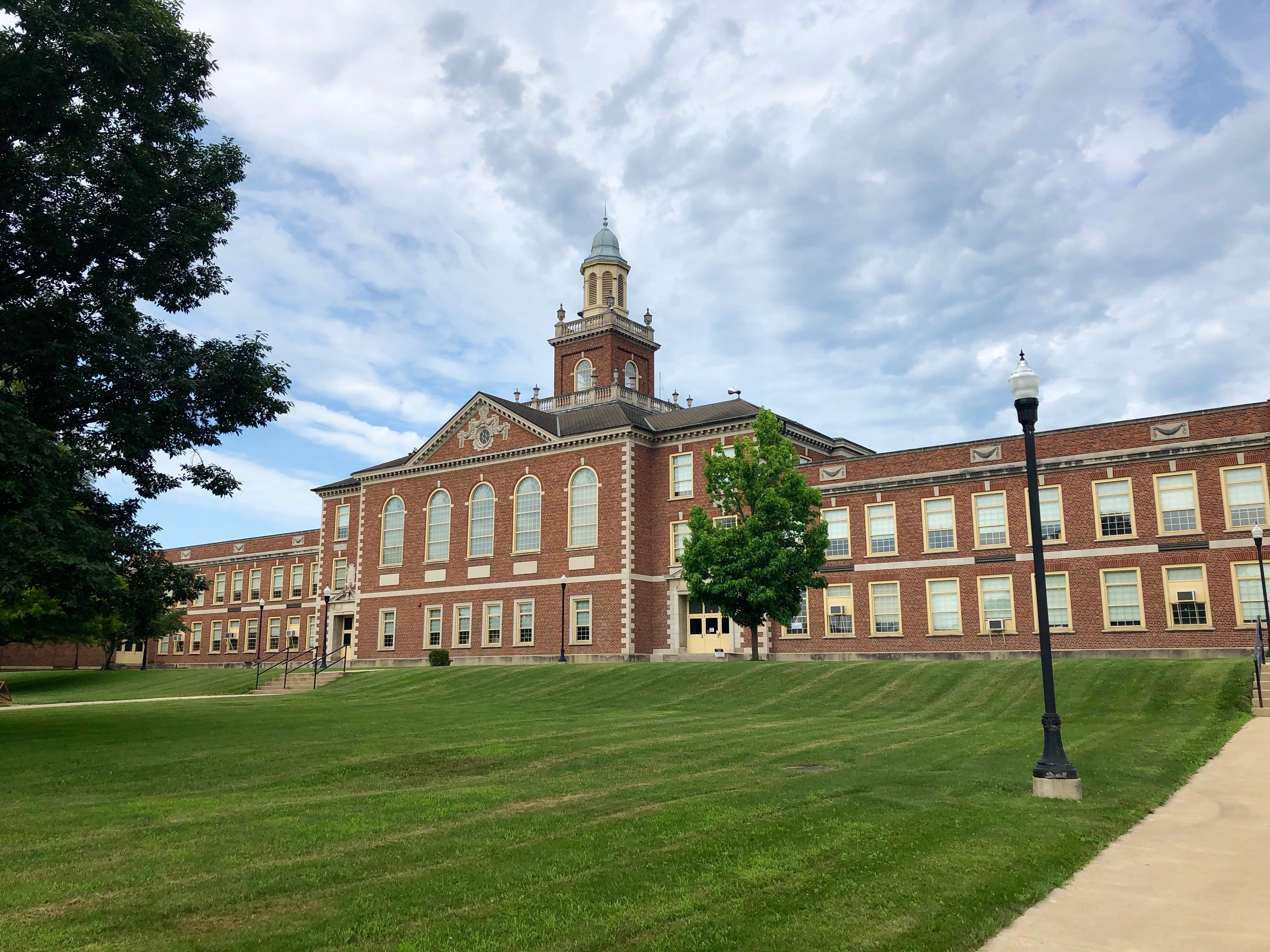

Location
- 380 Hub Etchison Parkway; Richmond, Wayne County, Indiana 47374; United States; 39°49′19″N 84°54′06″W

Information
- Type: Public high school
- School district: Richmond Community Schools
- Principal: Rae Woolpy
- Teaching staff: 83.24 (FTE)
- Grades: 9-12
- Enrollment: 1,273 (2024-2025)
- Student to teacher ratio: 15.29
- Color
- Athletics conference: North Central
- Team name: Red Devils
- Newspaper: The Register
- Yearbook: The Pierian
- Website: rhs.werrichmond.com
- Richmond High School
- U.S. National Register of Historic Places
- Location within Indiana Location within the United States
- Location: Roughly bounded by N. 16th, E and A Sts., and alley west of N. 10th St.
- Area: 15 acres (6.1 ha)
- Architectural style: Colonial revival
- NRHP reference No.: 15000602
- Added to NRHP: September 22, 2015

Richmond High School is a public high school in Richmond, Indiana, United States. It is the home of the Richmond Red Devils, who are members of the North Central Conference of the Indiana High School Athletic Association (IHSAA). Prior to 1939, the school was known as Morton High School in honor of Indiana's Civil War Governor, Oliver P. Morton. The current principal of Richmond High is Rae Woolpy.

== Facilities ==
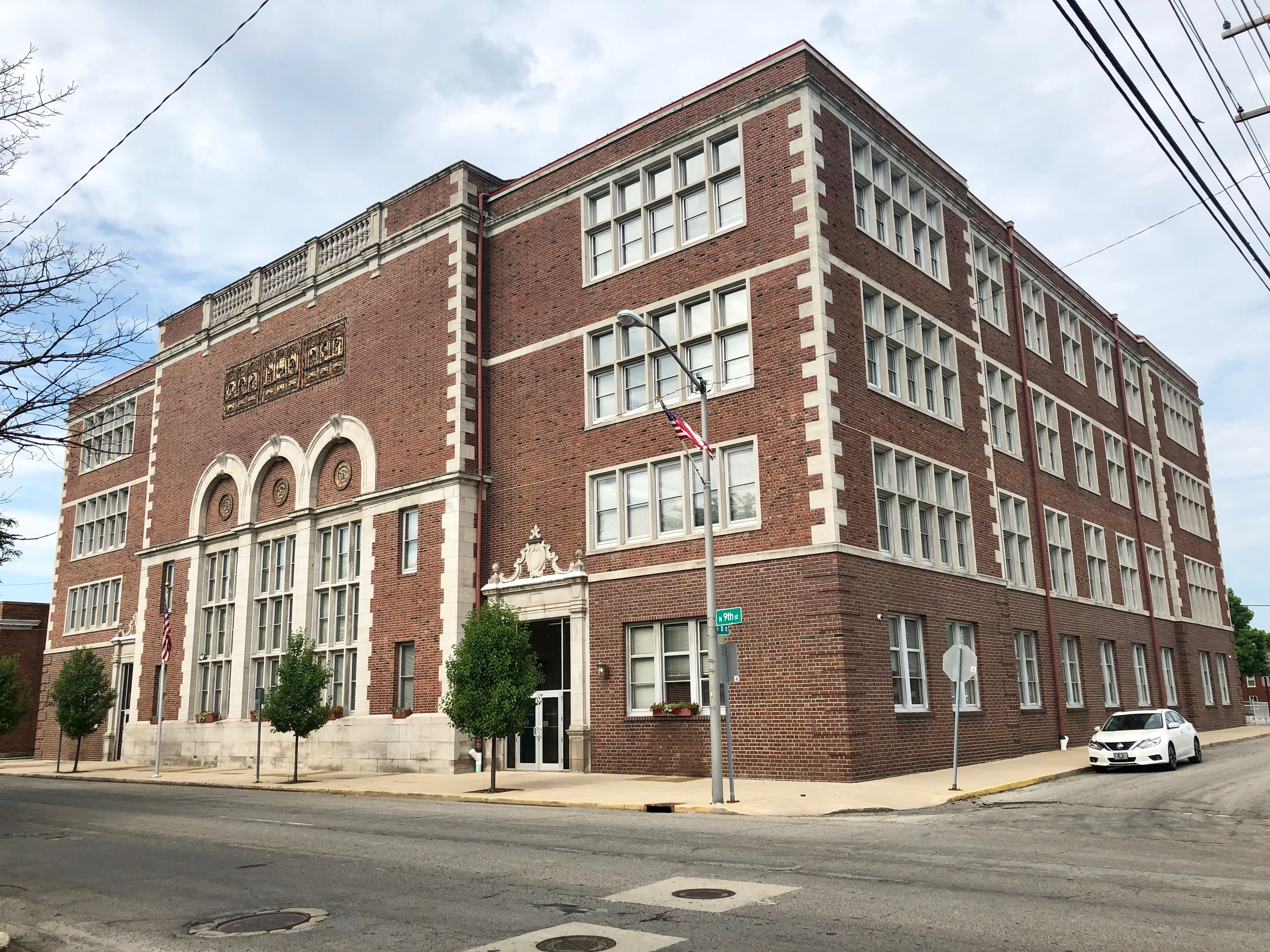
The former Morton High School building designed by William B. Ittner

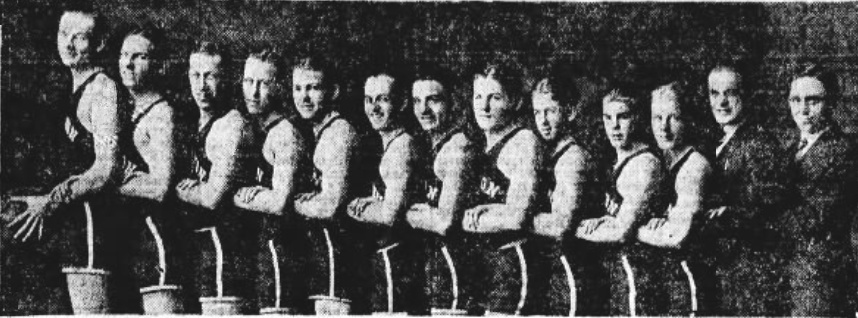
Boys' Basketball team in 1924. Future NFL Coach Weeb Ewbank, playing forward in his senior year, is fourth from right

Built in 1939–1941, the Colonial revival-style school originally consisted of an academic building called Morton Hall, a gymnasium called Civic Hall, and McGuire Hall, which houses the Richmond Art Museum. After outgrowing the Civic Hall gymnasium, the Tiernan Center was built as the home to boys' and girls' basketball, volleyball, and wrestling. The old Civic Hall gymnasium was converted into the Civic Hall Performing Arts Center, an auditorium which seats 924 and is home to the Richmond Symphony Orchestra in addition to other school and civic performing arts events. The current building consists of 500,000 square feet for instruction and student support services.

It was listed on the National Register of Historic Places in 2015.

== Athletics ==
RHS offers numerous sports for student athletes. This includes baseball (boys'), basketball, cross-country, football, golf, gymnastics (girls'), soccer, softball (girls'), tennis, volleyball (girls'), and wrestling. A bowling team for both boys and girls competes on the club level.

State Championships
Sport	Year(s)
Boys Basketball (1)	1992
Boys Cross Country (1)	1994
Boys Golf (5)	1941, 1993, 1996, 1997, 2003
Wrestling (1)	1958

== Notable alumni ==
- Timmy Brown, former NFL running back and actor
- John Wilbur Chapman, evangelist
- Vice Admiral Terry Cross, Vice Commandant, United States Coast Guard
- Nathan Davis, former NFL player
- George Duning, Oscar-nominated composer
- Jack Everly, pops conductor, Indianapolis Symphony Orchestra
- Weeb Ewbank (Class of 1924), coach of the 1958 and 1959 NFL champion Baltimore Colts and the Super Bowl III champion New York Jets
- Vagas Ferguson, football player
- Paul Flatley, former NFL Rookie-of-the-Year (Minnesota Vikings)
- Norman Foster, actor, director
- Mary Haas, linguist
- Jeff Hamilton, jazz drummer
- Micajah C. Henley, roller skate maker
- William “Bill” Holder, writer, author
- Baby Huey, popular music artist
- Charles A. Hufnagel, artificial heart valve inventor
- Dominic James, basketball player at Marquette University, 2006 Big East Rookie of the Year
- C. Francis Jenkins, television pioneer
- Jim Jones, founder-leader of Peoples Temple
- Melvyn "Deacon" Jones, blues organist
- Harry Keenan actor
- Esther Kellner, author
- Jim Logan, football player
- Johnny Logan, professional basketball player
- Lamar Lundy, football player, one of the L.A. Rams Fearsome Foursome
- Kenneth MacDonald, actor
- Dick Murley, former NFL player
- Jennifer Niven, author of All the Bright Places
- Daniel G. Reid, industrialist and philanthropist
- "Singin' Sam", born Harry Frankel, radio star, minstrel
- Wendell Stanley, Nobel Prize winner
- Mel Thompson, college basketball player and coach
- Bo Van Pelt, professional golfer
- Burton J. Westcott, automobile manufacturer
- Gaar Williams, cartoonist
- Billy Wright, college basketball coach
- Wilbur Wright, aviation pioneer

== See also ==
- List of high schools in Indiana
