= Donal Walsh =

Donal Walsh may refer to:

- Donal Walsh (activist), Irish anti-suicide campaigner
- Donie Walsh, Irish Olympian

== See also ==
- Donald Walsh
