= Hoosier Theater Building =

- U.S. National Register of Historic Places
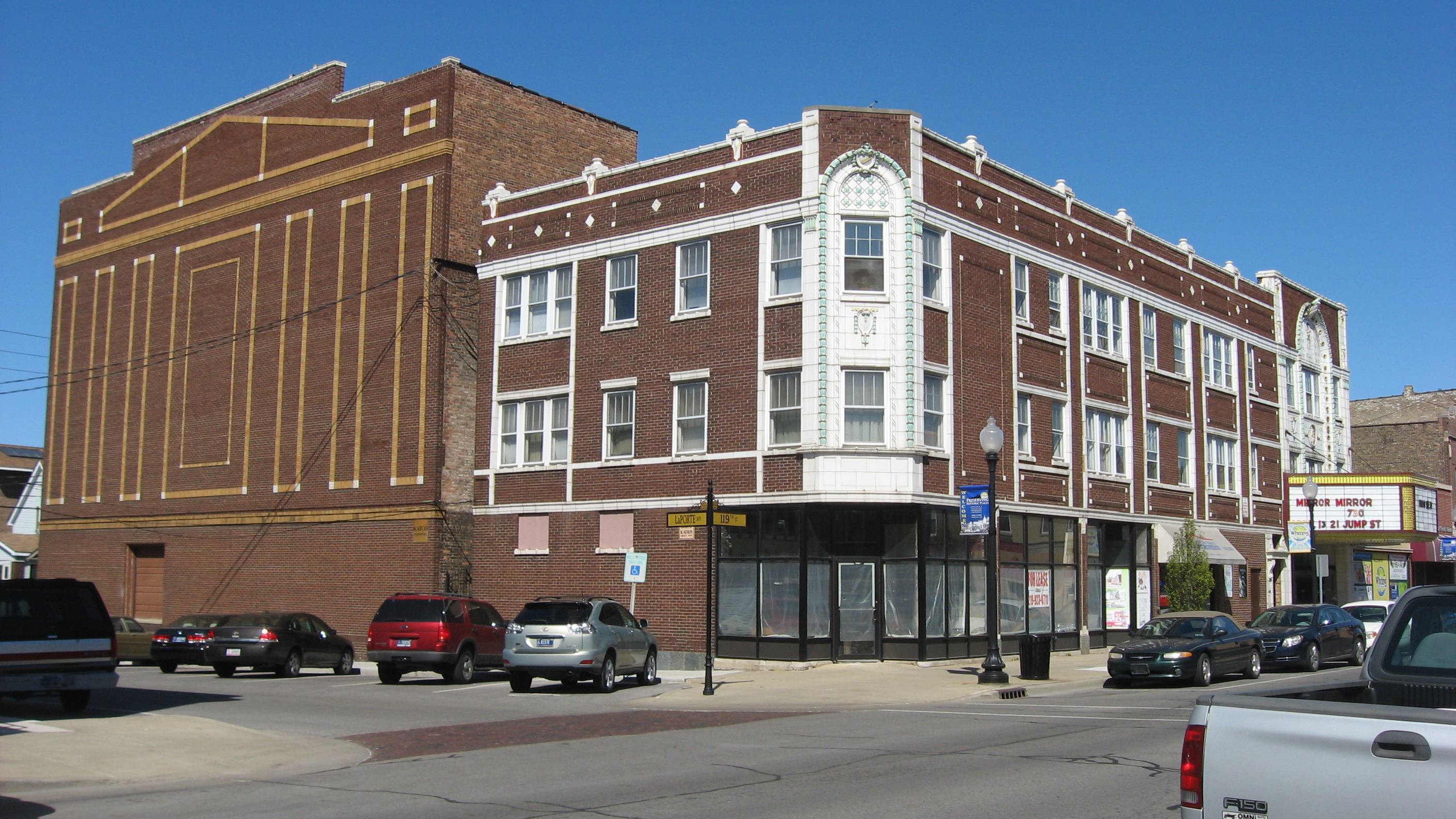
- Hoosier Theater Building, April 2012

- Location within Indiana Location within the United States
- Location: 1329-1335 One Hundred-nineteenth St., Whiting, Indiana
- Coordinates: 41°40′47″N 87°29′47″W
- Area: less than one acre
- Built: 1924
- NRHP reference No.: 87000069
- Added to NRHP: February 18, 1987

Hoosier Theater Building is a historic theatre and attached commercial / residential building located at Whiting, Indiana. It was built in 1924, and is a three-story, rectangular, brown brick building. It has a flat roof and three storefronts, along with the 2 1/2-story arched theater entrance trimmed in terra cotta and marquee. The theater is a plain 3 1/2-story brick structure attached to the end and rear of the commercial / residential section.

It was listed in the National Register of Historic Places in 1987.
