= Pierogi Fest =

Food festival in Indiana

- Status: Inactive
- Genre: Food festival
- Frequency: Annually
- Locations: Whiting, Indiana, United States
- Coordinates: 41°40′45.5″N 87°29′56.7″W
- Years active: 32
- Inaugurated: 1994
- Founders: Marty Dybel, Tom Dabertin and Darlene Beerling
- Participants: 650
- Attendance: 350,000
- Area: Northwest Indiana
- Organizer: Whiting-Robertsdale Chamber of Commerce
- Website: www.pierogifest.net

The Pierogi Fest is an annual festival in Whiting, Indiana, United States, organized by the Whiting–Robertsdale Chamber of Commerce (WRCoC). It gets its name from the pierogi, a Polish dumpling. It draws more than 250,000 visitors each year.

The festival takes place on the last weekend of July, on 119th Street in downtown Whiting. The street is only open to foot traffic during the festival. There are food booths set up along the streets serving pierogi, kielbasa and sauerkraut. There are also live music performances, and carnival rides. Other events include a Polka Parade, Pierogi Toss and eating competitions, and the Mr. Pierogi Songfest, which features food and fest-related parodies of popular songs. It features locally famous characters to bring goodwill, such as Mr. Pierogi, the Buscias, Miss Paczki, Halupki Guy, Polkahontas, and the Pieroguettes.

Pierogi Fest has been featured by Oprah, Yahoo Travel, and more.

In 2017 the festival's organizers filed a trademark infringement lawsuit in federal court against the organizers of the Edwardsville, Pennsylvania, Pierogi Festival, asking them to change their event's name. At first the Edwardsville Hometown Committee (EHC), who characterized the WRCoC's requested licensing fee as "extortionate", filed a counterclaim challenging the trademark and seeking damages against the WRCoC for enforcing an invalid trademark. By the beginning of June 2018, when the Edwardsville event is held, however, the two sides had reached a settlement in which the EHC recognized the trademark in return for permission to hold its own.

2020 saw the festival get cancelled due to the COVID-19 pandemic but it was held in 2021.

== See also ==
- Lists of festivals
- Polish cuisine
