= Ed Stege =

American basketball player (1913–1985)

Personal information
- Born: September 4, 1913
- Died: March 24, 1985 (aged 71) Madison, Wisconsin, U.S.
- Listed height: 6 ft 6 in (1.98 m)
- Listed weight: 220 lb (100 kg)

Career information
- College: Wisconsin (1934–1936)
- Position: Forward

Career history
- 1937–1938: Chicago Duffy Florals
- 1938: Oshkosh All-Stars
- 1938–1939: Chicago Cavaliers
- 1939–1940: Chicago Duffy Florals

Edward Richard Stege (September 4, 1913 – March 24, 1985) was an American professional basketball player. He played for the Oshkosh All-Stars in the National Basketball League during the 1937–38 season and appeared in just two games.

== Career statistics ==
Legend
GP	Games played	FGM	Field goals made
FTM	Free throws made	FTA	Free throws attempted
FT%	Free throw percentage	PTS	Total points
PPG	Points per game	**Bold**	Career high

=== NBL ===
==== Regular season ====
Year	Team	GP	FGM	FTM	PTS	PPG
1937-38	Oshkosh	2	0	0	0	.0
