= Willis Young =

American basketball player

Personal information
- Born: October 27, 1911 Carroll County, Indiana, U.S.
- Died: April 3, 1981 (aged 69) Richardson, Texas, U.S.

Career information
- High school: Delphi (Delphi, Indiana)
- Playing career: 1931–1938
- Position: Center

Career history
- 1931–1934: Schuessler A.C. of Chicago
- 1934–1937: Chicago Duffy Florals
- 1938: Whiting Ciesar All-Americans

Willis Verl Young (October 27, 1911 – April 3, 1981), frequently misnamed as Willie Young, was an American professional basketball player. He played in the National Basketball League in just two games for the Whiting Ciesar All-Americans during the 1937–38 season (both being playoff appearances).

== Career statistics ==
=== NBL ===
Legend
GP	Games played	FGM	Field goals made
FTM	Free throws made	FTA	Free throws attempted
FT%	Free throw percentage	PTS	Total points
PPG	Points per game	**Bold**	Career high

==== Playoffs ====
Year	Team	GP	FGM	FTM	PTS	PPG
1938	Whiting	2	0	0	0	.0
