= Louie Sauer =

American basketball player

Personal information
- Born: September 3, 1915 Indiana, U.S.
- Died: September 1985 (aged 69–70) Herscher, Illinois, U.S.
- Listed height: 6 ft 6 in (1.98 m)
- Listed weight: 235 lb (107 kg)

Career information
- High school: Herscher (Herscher, Illinois)
- College: Valparaiso (1933–1937)
- Position: Power forward / center

Career history
- 1937–1938: Kankakee Gallagher Trojans

Louis Sauer (September 3, 1915 – September 1985) was an American professional basketball player. He played college basketball for Valparaiso University before playing in the National Basketball League. In the NBL, Woltzen played for the Kankakee Gallagher Trojans during the 1937–38 season and averaged 6.6 points per game.
