= Fred Arndt =

American basketball player

Personal information
- Born: February 24, 1917 San Pierre, Indiana
- Died: October 9, 2002 (aged 85) Schererville, Indiana
- Listed height: 6 ft 0 in (1.83 m)
- Listed weight: 160 lb (73 kg)

Career information
- High school: Hammond (Hammond, Indiana)
- Position: Forward

Career history
- 1934–1935: Munster Brook House Five
- 1936–1937: Hammond
- 1937: Whiting Ciesar All-Americans
- 1937–1938: Hammond Spud Chandler Memorial Five
- 1937–1938: Hammond Optimists

Fredrick Edward Arndt Jr. (February 24, 1917 – October 9, 2002) was an American professional basketball player. He played for the Whiting Ciesar All-Americans in the National Basketball League for two games during the 1937–38 season.

Sources list Arndt as having attended Purdue University, but he does not appear in any all-time rosters and therefore he likely did not play for the school's basketball team.
