= Whiting Memorial Community House =

- U.S. National Register of Historic Places
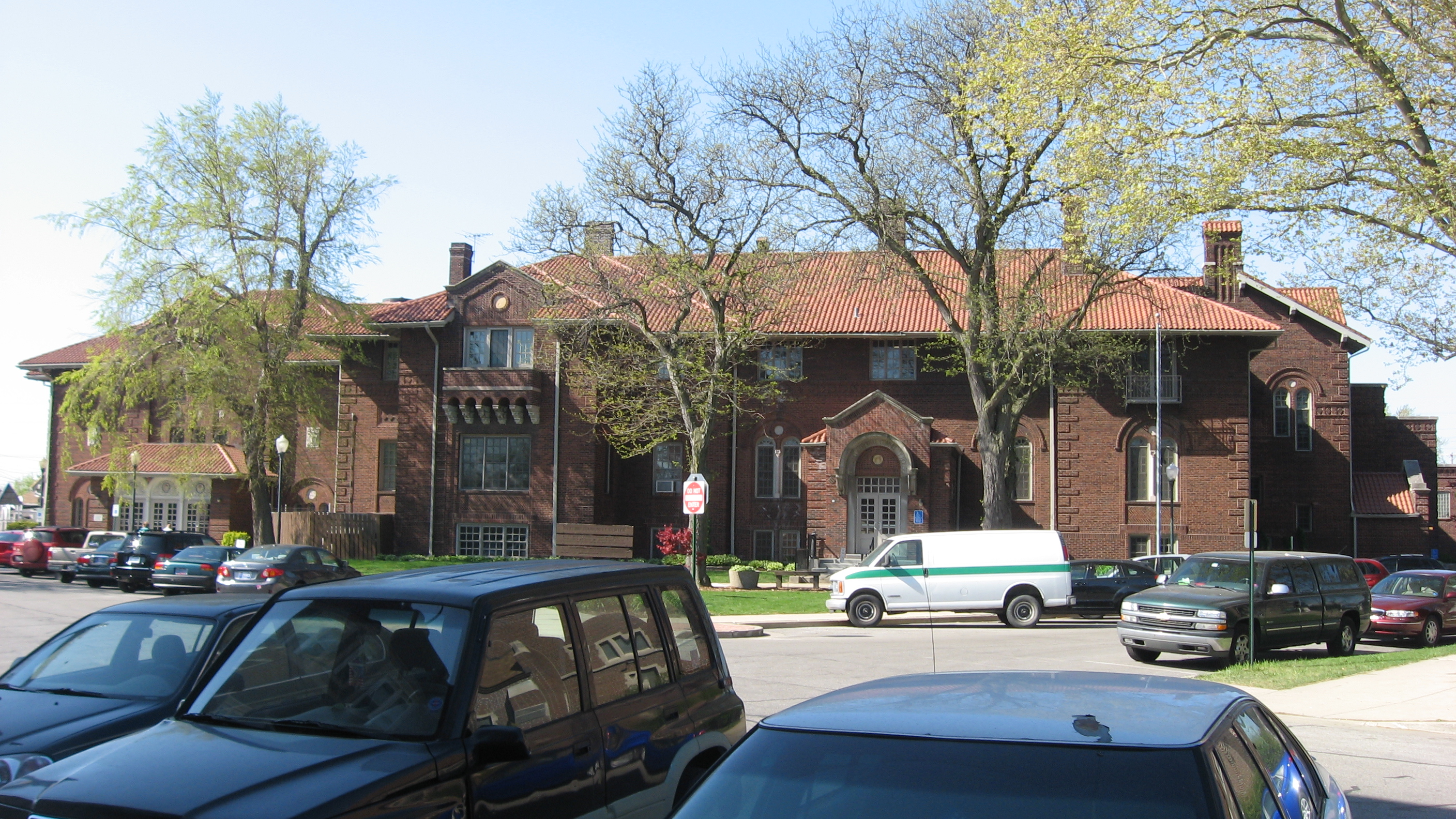
- Whiting Memorial Community House, April 2012

- Location within Indiana Location within the United States
- Location: 1938 Clark St., Whiting, Indiana
- Coordinates: 41°40′41″N 87°29′47″W
- Area: 2 acres (0.81 ha)
- Built: 1923
- Architect: Shattuck & Layer
- NRHP reference No.: 80000044
- Added to NRHP: February 8, 1980

Whiting Memorial Community House, also known as Whiting Community Center, is a historic community center in Whiting, Indiana. It was built in 1923, and is a two-story, steel frame building faced in rough red brick and in an eclectic style. It has a hipped red tile roof, scattered gables and arches, and concrete bracket and medallion detailing. The building houses an auditorium, meeting rooms, an indoor track, gyms, lockers, a bowling alley, and a swimming pool. The Standard Oil Company built it for the city of Whiting.

The Whiting Memorial Community House was also the original home of the Whiting Ciesar All-Americans of both the Midwest Basketball Conference and the succeeding National Basketball League (back when the building was potentially originally named the Whiting Community Building) before the Ciesar All-Americans moved to Hammond, Indiana for their final few seasons of existence in the NBL.

It was listed in the National Register of Historic Places in 1980.
