= John Wiethe =

American multi-sport athlete (1912–1989)

Biographical details
- Born: October 17, 1912; Cincinnati, Ohio, U.S.
- Died: May 3, 1989 (aged 76)

Playing career

Football
- 1936–1939: Xavier
- 1939–1942: Detroit Lions
- Position(s): Guard/Linebacker

Coaching career (HC unless noted)

Basketball
- 1946–1953: Cincinnati

Head coaching record
- Overall: 106–47
- Tournaments: 0–1 (NIT)

Accomplishments and honors

Championships
- As coach: 5 MAC (1947–1951)

Awards
- As player: 2× NFL All-Pro (1939, 1940)

John Albert "Socko" Wiethe (October 17, 1912 – May 3, 1989) was an early all-around sports star in football, baseball and basketball. He played professional American football guard/linebacker in the National Football League. He played four seasons for the Detroit Lions (1939–1942). He also briefly played in the National Basketball League during the late 1930s, and also played independent pro baseball. He later coached both football and then basketball at the University of Cincinnati. In later years, he was also active in local Cincinnati politics as a Democrat.

== Head coaching record ==
Statistics overview
Season	Team	Overall	Conference	Standing	Postseason
Cincinnati Bearcats (Mid-American Conference) (1946–1953)
1946–47	Cincinnati	17–9	6–2	1st	
1947–48	Cincinnati	17–7	7–2	1st	
1948–49	Cincinnati	23–5	9–1	1st	
1949–50	Cincinnati	20–6	10–0	1st	
1950–51	Cincinnati	18–4	7–1	1st	NIT First Round
1951–52	Cincinnati	11–16	5–5	5th	
John Wiethe:		106–47(.693)	44–11 (.800)		
Total:		106–47(.693)			
National champion Postseason invitational champion Conference regular season champion Conference regular season and conference tournament champion Division regular season champion Division regular season and conference tournament champion Conference tournament champion
