= Johnny Hoekstra =

American basketball player

Personal information
- Born: November 7, 1917 Wichert, Illinois, US
- Died: October 25, 2006 (aged 88) Grand Rapids, Michigan, US
- Listed height: 6 ft 5 in (1.96 m)
- Listed weight: 225 lb (102 kg)

Career information
- High school: St. Anne (St. Anne Township, Illinois)
- College: Gallagher Business School (1935–1937)
- Position: Center

Career history
- 1937–1938: Kankakee Gallagher Trojans

John Benjamin Hoekstra (November 7, 1917 – October 25, 2006) was an American professional basketball player. He played in the National Basketball League for the Kankakee Gallagher Trojans during the 1937–38 season and averaged 5.8 points per game.
