= Don Betourne =

American basketball player and coach

Personal information
- Born: February 27, 1915 Bourbonnais, Illinois
- Died: March 18, 2002 (aged 87) Bourbonnais, Illinois
- Listed height: 6 ft 1 in (1.85 m)
- Listed weight: 200 lb (91 kg)

Career information
- College: St. Viator (1933–1937)
- Position: Forward

Career history

Playing
- 1937–1938: Kankakee Gallagher Trojans

Coaching
- 1937–1938: Kankakee Gallagher Trojans

Donald Joseph Betourne (February 27, 1915 – March 18, 2002) was an American professional basketball player and head coach. He played in the National Basketball League for the Kankakee Gallagher Trojans during the 1937–38 season. Betourne served as a player-coach for the Trojans (the only year the team existed). He played at St. Viator College prior to his time in the NBL.
