= Loren Wright =

American basketball player

Personal information
- Born: May 11, 1917 Dayton, Ohio, U.S.
- Died: September 10, 2005 (aged 88) Beavercreek, Ohio, U.S.

Career information
- High school: Fairview (Dayton, Ohio)
- Position: Guard / forward

Career history
- 1938: Cincinnati Comellos
- 1939–1941: Delco

Loren James Wright (May 11, 1917 – September 10, 2005) was an American professional basketball player. He played in the National Basketball League in four games for the Cincinnati Comellos during the 1937–38 season and averaged 1.0 points per game.
