= Everett Swank =

American basketball player

Personal information
- Born: February 17, 1913 Clarks, Indiana, U.S.
- Died: June 1, 2000 (aged 87) Greenwood, Indiana, U.S.
- Listed height: 5 ft 11 in (1.80 m)
- Listed weight: 165 lb (75 kg)

Career information
- High school: Twelve Mile (Twelve Mile, Indiana)
- College: Indianapolis (1936–1937)
- Playing career: 1937–1944
- Position: Guard / forward

Career history

Playing
- 1937–1939: Indianapolis Kautskys
- 1942–1944: Indianapolis Pure Oils

Coaching
- 1952–1953: Southport HS (assistant)

Everett W. Swank (February 17, 1913 – June 1, 2000) was an American professional basketball player. He played for the Indianapolis Kautskys in the National Basketball League and averaged 1.5 points per game.
