= Frank Shamel =

American basketball player

Personal information
- Born: December 6, 1912 Greencastle, Indiana, U.S.
- Died: November 2, 1994 (aged 81) Sun City, Arizona, U.S.
- Listed height: 6 ft 0 in (1.83 m)
- Listed weight: 200 lb (91 kg)

Career information
- High school: Lincoln (Cambridge City, Indiana)
- College: Earlham (1931–1934)
- Position: Forward

Career history
- 1937–1938: Richmond King Clothiers / Cincinnati Comellos

Franklin Rule Shamel (December 6, 1912 – November 2, 1994) was an American professional basketball player. He appeared in three games for the Cincinnati Comellos in the National Basketball League during the 1937–38 season and averaged 3.3 points per game.

== Career statistics ==
Legend
GP	Games played	FGM	Field goals made
FTM	Free throws made	FTA	Free throws attempted
FT%	Free throw percentage	PTS	Total points
PPG	Points per game	**Bold**	Career high

=== NBL ===
==== Regular season ====
Year	Team	GP	FGM	FTM	PTS	PPG
1937–38	Cincinnati	3	5	0	10	3.3
