= Ken Jordan (basketball) =

American basketball player (1912–1994)

Personal information
- Born: June 18, 1912 California, U.S.
- Died: October 14, 1994 (aged 82) Fort Mitchell, Kentucky, U.S.
- Listed height: 6 ft 2 in (1.88 m)
- Listed weight: 180 lb (82 kg)

Career information
- College: Xavier (1931–1934)
- Playing career: 1934–1939
- Position: Forward

Career history

Playing
- 1934–1935: Falls City – Cincinnati
- 1937: Cincinnati Comellos
- 1938–1939: Pressler – Cincinnati

Coaching
- 1937–1938: Xavier (assistant)

Kenneth Patrick Jordan Sr. (June 18, 1912 – October 14, 1994) was an American professional basketball player. He played in the National Basketball League for the Cincinnati Comellos in eight games during the 1937–38 season. He also competed in the Amateur Athletic Union and independent leagues. Jordan lettered in football and basketball at Xavier University, and spent one season (1937–38) as an assistant coach for the basketball team.
