= Don Walsh (Canadian football) =

Canadian gridiron football player (1932–2006)

Profile
- Positions: Linebacker, Guard

Personal information
- Born: 1932; Trois-Rivières, Quebec, Canada
- Died: 2006 (aged 73–74); Vancouver, British Columbia, Canada

Career information
- College: University of Denver

Career history
- 1953–1954: Calgary Stampeders
- 1955–1964: Saskatchewan Roughriders

Don Walsh (1932-2006) was a football player who mainly played for the Saskatchewan Roughriders in the Canadian Football League (CFL) from 1953 to 1964 at offensive guard and linebacker.

Don Walsh was born in Trois-Rivières, Quebec, and grew up in Montreal. Walsh played college football at the University of Denver. Walsh first joined the Calgary Stampeders in 1953 but played most of his career as a member of the Saskatchewan Roughriders from 1955 to 1964 at the positions of offensive guard and linebacker.

After studying the subject at the University of Denver and the University of Arizona and after his professional career, Walsh became an architect. He died from cancer in Vancouver at the age of 74.
