= Stan Arnzen =

American basketball and baseball player

Personal information
- Born: August 8, 1914 Newport, Kentucky
- Died: April 23, 1977 (aged 62) Fort Mitchell, Kentucky
- Listed height: 5 ft 11 in (1.80 m)
- Listed weight: 160 lb (73 kg)

Career information
- High school: Newport (Newport, Kentucky)
- College: Morehead State (1935–1937)
- Position: Forward

Career history

Playing
- 1937–1938: Cincinnati Comellos

Coaching
- 1948–1970: Newport HS

Stanley Henry Arnzen (August 8, 1914 – April 23, 1977) was an American professional basketball player. He played for the Cincinnati Comellos in the National Basketball League during the 1937–38 season and averaged 4.6 points per game. He played baseball and basketball at Morehead State University for two years.

In 1937, Arnzen signed to play minor league baseball for the Cincinnati Reds organization. He competed for the Welch Miners (1937), Columbia Reds (1938–1939), and the Charleston Senators (1940). He won the Spalding Trophy in his first season, given annually to "Outstanding Minor League Player" of that season. A broken leg ended his baseball career before he made it to the MLB.

Arnzen became a high school teacher as well as a baseball and basketball coach at Newport High School in Kentucky. He did not have a losing season in 22 years as basketball coach.

== Career statistics ==
Legend
GP	Games played	FGM	Field goals made
FTM	Free throws made	FTA	Free throws attempted
FT%	Free throw percentage	PTS	Total points
PPG	Points per game	**Bold**	Career high

=== NBL ===
==== Regular season ====
Year	Team	GP	FGM	FTM	PTS	PPG
1937–38	Cincinnati	5	10	3	23	4.6
