= Fred Grafft =

American basketball player

Personal information
- Born: February 20, 1912 Rembrandt, Iowa
- Died: August 13, 1993 (aged 81) Sparta, Tennessee
- Listed height: 5 ft 9 in (1.75 m)

Career information
- High school: Kickapoo Union (Downs, Illinois)
- College: Gallagher Business School (1929–1933)
- Position: Guard

Career history
- 1937–1938: Kankakee Gallagher Trojans

Frederick Evert Grafft (February 20, 1912 – August 13, 1993) was an American professional basketball player. He played in the National Basketball League for the Kankakee Gallagher Trojans during the 1937–38 season and averaged 8.6 point per game.
