= Kankakee Community Resource Center =

Coordinates: 41°07′14.8″N 87°51′38.1″W

The Kankakee Community Resource Center is a multi-purpose center located in Kankakee, Illinois, United States It is located in a renovated National Guard Armory. The Center has a gymnasium and an auditorium. It offers many community programs, and it is home to the Kankakee County Soldiers formerly of the International Basketball League.

The building was also the home of the Kankakee Gallagher Trojans, an attempt at a professional basketball team from the nearby Gallagher Business School trade school that focused on the business world that was hosted around there at the time, during the inaugural season of the National Basketball League, a precursor to the National Basketball Association.
