= Civic Hall Performing Arts Center =

Performance venue in Richmond, Indiana, US

Civic Hall Performing Arts Center is a performance venue in Richmond, Indiana, US, owned and operated by Richmond Community Schools. The building is the former high school gymnasium, Civic Hall, on the campus of Richmond High School. In the late 1980s, work began to transform Civic Hall into a performing arts center. The Civic Hall Performing Arts Center opened to students and the public in the fall of 1993. It seats a total of 924, with room for 616 on the floor and 308 in the balcony. The renovation was funded with money from the Richmond Community Schools, the Lucille Gamp Trust and individual and corporate contributions.
