= Don Walsh (basketball) =

American basketball player

Career information
- College: Gallagher Business School
- Position: Forward

Career history
- 1937: Kankakee Gallagher Trojans

Donald Walsh was an American professional basketball player. He played in the National Basketball League for the Kankakee Gallagher Trojans in four games during the 1937–38 season and averaged 1.0 point per game.
