= Whiting Refinery =

Oil refinery operated by BP

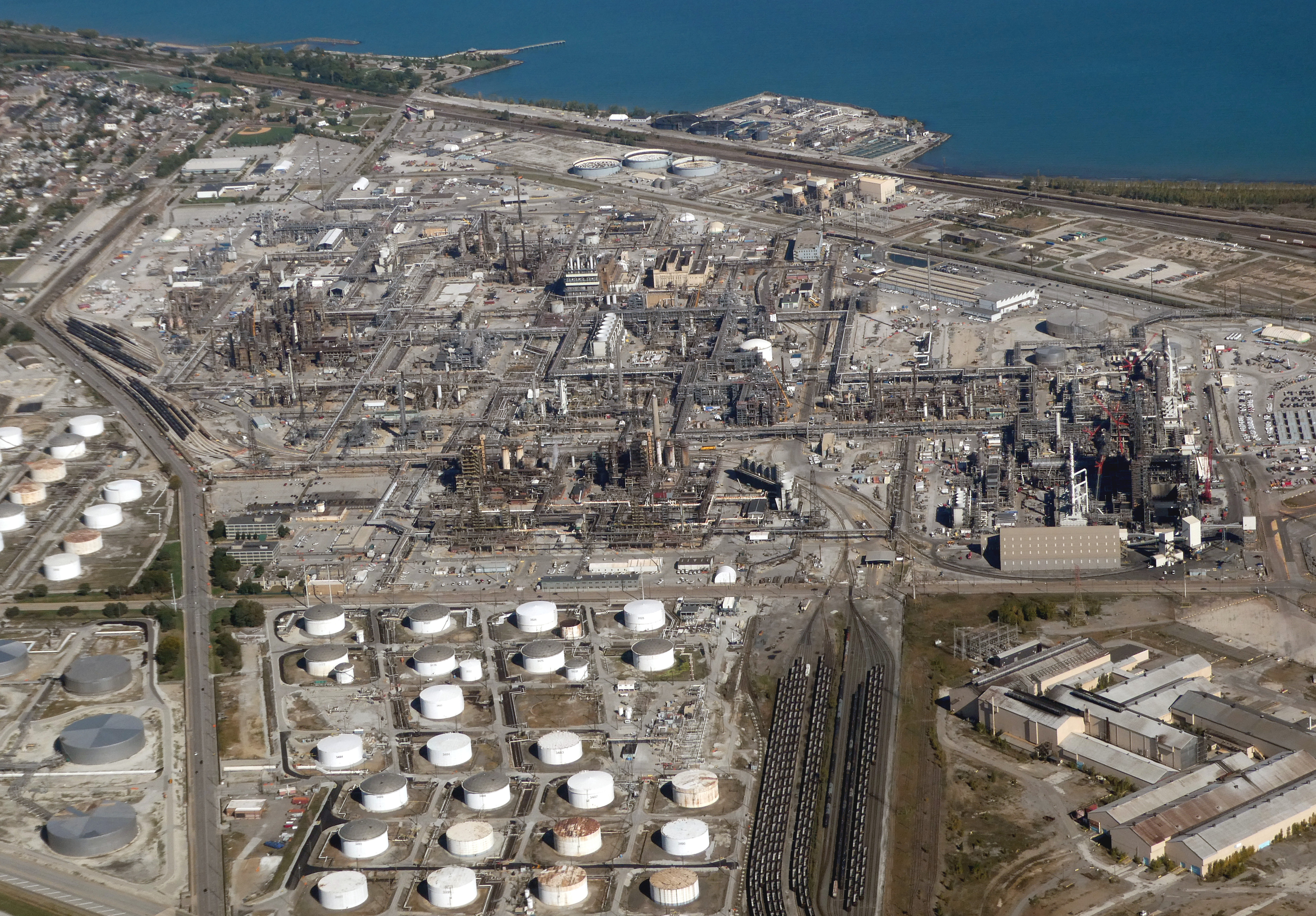
- Whiting Refinery in October 2024

- Location of the Whiting Refinery in Indiana, United States
- Location: Whiting, East Chicago, Hammond, Indiana, United States; 41°40′23″N 87°28′43″W

Refinery details
- Operator: BP Products North America
- Owner: BP
- Opened: 1889
- Area: 1,400 acres (570 ha)
- Capacity: 450,000 barrels per day (72,000 m^{3}/d)
- No. of employees: 1800

The Whiting Refinery is an oil refinery located on the southwestern shore of Lake Michigan and the Indiana Harbor and Ship Canal and operated by BP. The facility is primarily located in Whiting, Indiana, USA, though portions of the 1,400 acres (5.7 km^{2}) complex span into the neighboring cities of Hammond and East Chicago.

The refinery was established in 1889 by Standard Oil of Indiana. It is the eighth largest refinery in the US and has a capacity of more than 400,000 barrels per day (64,000 m^{3}/d) of crude oil.

== History ==
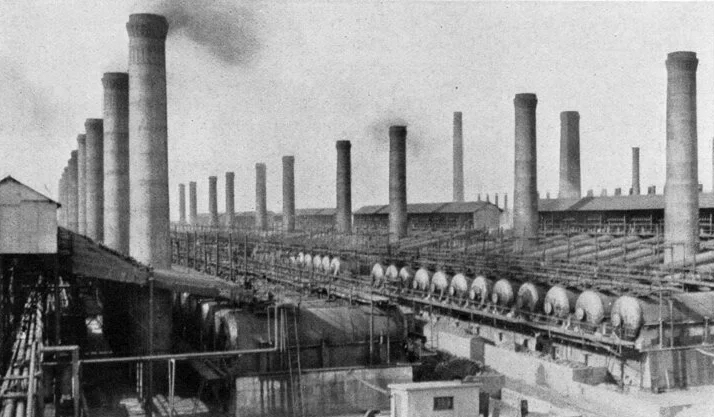
The refinery's pressure stills in 1919

=== The "Inferno at Whiting" ===
On the morning of 27 August 1955, several explosions occurred at a hydroformer at the Whiting Refinery, producing a mushroom cloud visible from 60 miles away and heat intense enough to melt nearby train cars. Flying projectiles damaged many of the surrounding homes, while 3-year-old Ricky Plewniak was killed in his sleep after a 10-foot steel pipe tore through the roof of his bedroom. By the time the last of the fires was finally extinguished on 4 September, the damage was estimated to be in excess of $10 million.

=== Modernization project ===
In 2012 BP undertook a $14B modernization project at Whiting to remove older, less efficient equipment and to install state-of-the-art pollution controls to emissions which will "reduce harmful air pollution that can cause respiratory problems such as asthma and are significant contributors to acid rain, smog and haze, by more than 4,000 tons per year." The new Gas Oil Hydrotreater and Coker with a reconfigured distillation unit. The new Pipestill 12 unit which was upgraded with a coker to handle the heavier Western Canadian Select crude oil was built to increase energy security in the Midwest by replacing lighter crude oil with heavier crudes.

=== Mechanical problems and shut down ===
In August 2015 the most important unit of the Whiting refinery, capable of handling 240 thousand barrel per day and known as 12 pipe still, was shut down - reportedly due to holes found in piping, "disrupted markets throughout the region." The price of oil in Oklahoma fell and the price of gasoline in the USA Midwest increased. The price of Western Canadian Select, the heavy crude oil from western Canada refined at the Whiting refinery, fell to $20/bbl - its lowest price in nine years, causing the Canadian oil to be redirected into oil storage at the Oklahoma storage hub. An oil buildup at the Cushing hub is causing a spread between the price of the North American oil (known as the WTI) and the European price (known as Brent). That spread has averaged about $6 for 2015. During 2013 when the 12 Pipe Still unit was upgraded to handle the heavier Canadian crude oil, the WTI-Brent spread increased to over $20. As of August 2015, the Cushing oil hub is at 80% of its 71-million-barrel capacity, rising at the rate of about 1 million barrels a week.(subscription required)

In August 2022, the Whiting refinery was shut down after a fire broke out at the refinery.

== Emissions ==
In 2001 as part of EPA's Petroleum Refinery Initiative BP consented to reduce emissions at all of its refineries. According to an internal fact sheet from BP, "[f]rom "2001 through 2008, the Whiting refinery reduced regulated air emissions 72%." However, BP North America did not fulfill all its obligations under the 2001 settlement agreement and committed new violations of the Clean Air Act at the Whiting refinery during the construction project, such as flaring devices. As a result, the Environmental Protection Agency (EPA) and the Department of Justice fined BP North America $8M and required the company to install innovative pollution controls similar to those in a 2012 EPA settlement with Ohio-based Marathon Petroleum Corporation in April 2012 which involved reducing flares and increasing combustion efficiencies. In 2021 BP settled a citizen suit brought by environmental groups by agreeing to stricter monitoring of soot particulate pollution and a $500,000 settlement. The lawsuit alleged that every day since August 2015, emissions from the Whiting Refinery had violated the Clean Air Act and that state and federal regulators, while aware of the violations, failed to take enforcement or regulatory action to prevent them.

== See also ==
- List of oil refineries
