= Whiting, Indiana =

- City
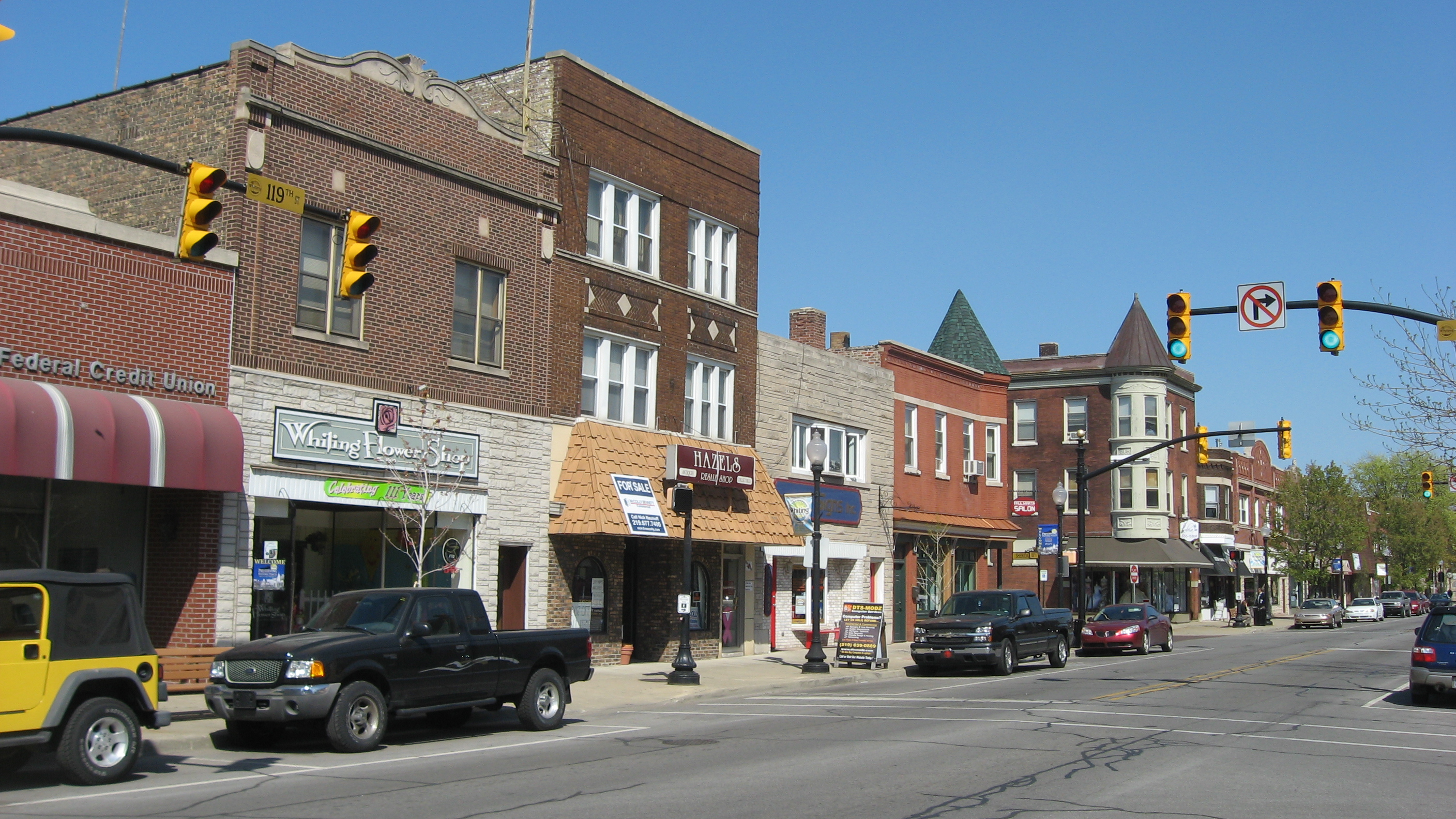
- Whiting's business district on 119th Street

- Flag Logo

- Location of Whiting in Lake County, Indiana.
- Coordinates: 41°40′23″N 87°29′03″W
- Country: United States
- State: Indiana
- County: Lake
- Township: North
- Founded: 1889
- Incorporated (town): 1895
- Incorporated (city): 1903
- Named for: Herbert L. "Pop" Whiting

Government
  - Type: Mayor-Council
  - Mayor: Steven Spebar (D)
  - Councilmembers: Chris Sarvanidis; Tom Michniewicz; Rebeca Michko; Mark Harbin; Shawn M. Turpin
  - City Clerk: John T. Haynes

Area
  - Total: 1.807 sq mi (4.679 km^{2})
  - Land: 1.807 sq mi (4.679 km^{2})
  - Water: 0 sq mi (0.000 km^{2})
- Elevation: 590 ft (180 m)

Population (2020)
  - Total: 4,559
  - Estimate (2023): 4,506
  - Density: 2,490/sq mi (963/km^{2})

Standard of living (2018-22)
  - Median household income: $59,740
  - Median home value: $188,200
- Time zone: UTC−6 (Central (CST))
  - Summer (DST): UTC−5 (CDT)
- ZIP Code: 46394
- Area code: 219
- FIPS code: 18-84122
- GNIS feature ID: 2397304
- Waterway: Lake Michigan
- Amtrak station: Hammond-Whiting
- Sales tax: 7.0%
- Website: whitingindiana.com

Whiting (/ˈwaɪtɪŋ/ WYTE-ing) is a city located in the Chicago Metropolitan Area in Lake County, Indiana, which was founded in 1889. The city is located on the southern shore of Lake Michigan. It is roughly 16 miles from the Chicago Loop and two miles from Chicago's South Side. Whiting is home to Whiting Refinery, the largest oil refinery in the Midwest. The population was 4,559 at the 2020 census.

== History ==
A post office was first established at Whiting in 1871. Whiting was incorporated as a town in 1895. It was named after a trainman who was killed in a crash there. Whiting was incorporated as a city in 1903.

The Hoosier Theater Building, Henry and Caroline Schrage House, and Whiting Memorial Community House are listed in the National Register of Historic Places.

== Geography ==
According to the United States Census Bureau, the city has a total area of 1.807 square miles (4.68 km^{2}), all land.

The Whiting post office (46394) serves not only the city of Whiting, but also the adjacent Hammond neighborhood of Robertsdale, immediately to the west. Addresses in this Hammond neighborhood show “Whiting, Indiana.” While not legally a part of the city of Whiting, locally the area has long been informally considered to be a culturally integrated part of Whiting. References to Whiting businesses or residents often include those technically from Hammond's Robertsdale.

== Demographics ==
Historical population
Census	Pop.	Note	%±
1880	115		—
1890	200		73.9%
1900	3,983		1,891.5%
1910	6,587		65.4%
1920	10,145		54.0%
1930	10,880		7.2%
1940	10,307		−5.3%
1950	9,669		−6.2%
1960	8,137		−15.8%
1970	7,054		−13.3%
1980	5,630		−20.2%
1990	5,155		−8.4%
2000	5,137		−0.3%
2010	4,997		−2.7%
2020	4,559		−8.8%
2023 (est.)	4,506		−1.2%
U.S. Decennial Census; 2020 Census

=== Racial and ethnic composition ===
Whiting city, Indiana – Racial and ethnic composition Note: the US Census treats Hispanic/Latino as an ethnic category. This table excludes Latinos from the racial categories and assigns them to a separate category. Hispanics/Latinos may be of any race.
Race / Ethnicity (NH = Non-Hispanic)	Pop 2000	Pop 2010	Pop 2020	% 2000	% 2010	% 2020
White alone (NH)	3,715	2,733	2,027	72.32%	54.69%	44.46%
Black or African American alone (NH)	25	141	144	0.49%	2.82%	3.16%
Native American or Alaska Native alone (NH)	7	9	0	0.14%	0.18%	0.00%
Asian alone (NH)	32	29	23	0.62%	0.58%	0.50%
Native Hawaiian or Pacific Islander alone (NH)	0	0	2	0.00%	0.00%	0.04%
Other race alone (NH)	1	2	13	0.02%	0.04%	0.29%
Mixed race or Multiracial (NH)	44	47	112	0.86%	0.94%	2.46%
Hispanic or Latino (any race)	1,313	2,036	2,238	25.56%	40.74%	49.09%
Total	5,137	4,997	4,559	100.00%	100.00%	100.00%

=== 2020 census ===
As of the 2020 census, Whiting had a population of 4,559, with 1,859 households including 1,106 family households. The population density was 2,536.6 inhabitants per square mile (979.4/km^{2}).

The median age was 37.5 years. 22.9% of residents were under the age of 18 and 13.6% were 65 years of age or older. For every 100 females there were 95.3 males, and for every 100 females age 18 and over there were 96.4 males age 18 and over.

100.0% of residents lived in urban areas, while 0.0% lived in rural areas.

Of all households, 30.3% had children under the age of 18 living in them, 36.3% were married-couple households, 25.9% were households with a male householder and no spouse or partner present, and 30.8% were households with a female householder and no spouse or partner present. About 34.9% of all households were made up of individuals and 12.4% had someone living alone who was 65 years of age or older.

There were 2,094 housing units, of which 11.2% were vacant. The homeowner vacancy rate was 2.0% and the rental vacancy rate was 8.5%.

=== 2010 census ===
As of the 2010 census, there were 4,997 people, 1,899 households, and 1,210 families residing in the city. The population density was 2,776.1 inhabitants per square mile (1,071.9/km^{2}). There were 2,197 housing units at an average density of 1,220.6 inhabitants per square mile (471.3/km^{2}). The racial makeup of the city was 76.3% White, 3.5% African American, 0.7% Native American, 0.7% Asian, 15.7% from other races, and 3.2% from two or more races. Hispanic or Latino of any race were 40.7% of the population.

There were 1,899 households, of which 37.1% had children under the age of 18 living with them, 38.1% were married couples living together, 18.6% had a female householder with no husband present, 7.0% had a male householder with no wife present, and 36.3% were non-families. 30.1% of all households were made up of individuals, and 11.3% had someone living alone who was 65 years of age or older. The average household size was 2.63 and the average family size was 3.32.

The median age in the city was 34.4 years. 26.9% of residents were under the age of 18; 9.4% were between the ages of 18 and 24; 27.3% were from 25 to 44; 24.7% were from 45 to 64; and 11.6% were 65 years of age or older. The gender makeup of the city was 49.1% male and 50.9% female.

== Parks ==
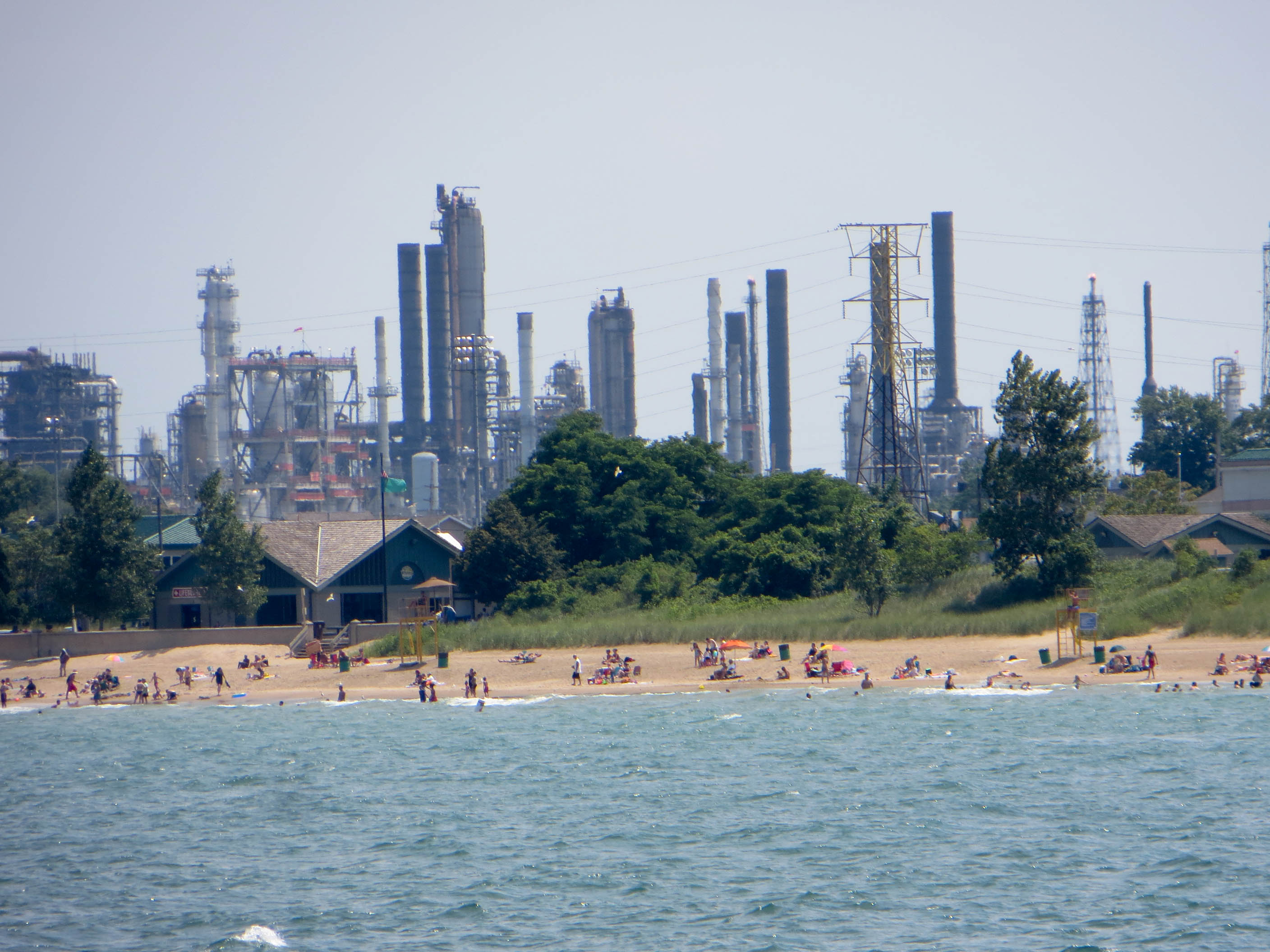
Whihala Beach

Whiting is home to five parks. Whiting Park, located on the Lake Michigan shoreline, is the most well known. It is a popular picnic spot for residents of Lake County, the South Side of Chicago, and Southland. Whihala Beach is located next to Whiting Park between Whiting and neighboring Hammond.

== Education ==
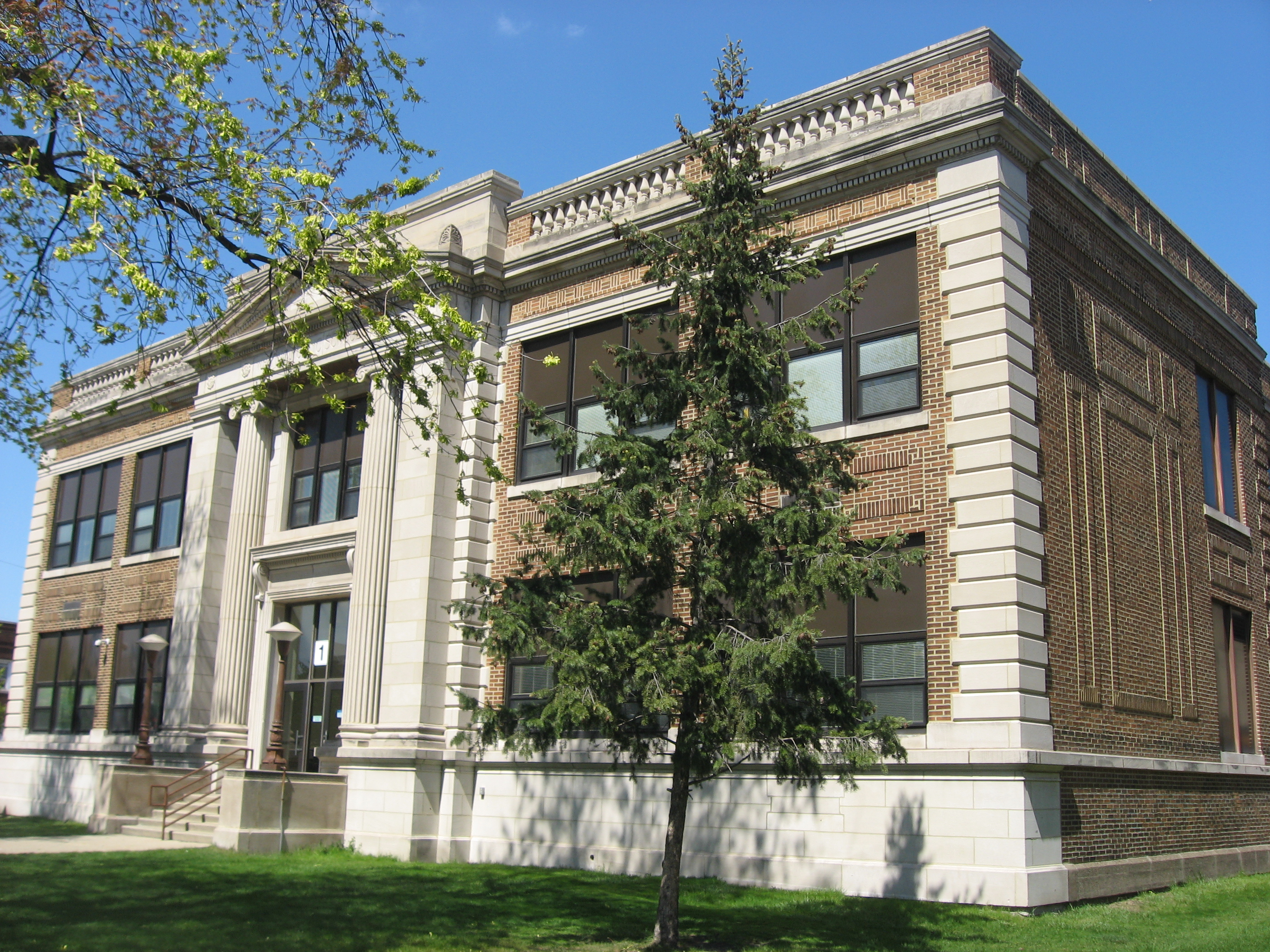
Whiting Public School

School City of Whiting serves all of Whiting. Whiting High School is the sole public high school serving Whiting.

The city is also home to a historic Carnegie Library, built in 1905. Whiting Public Library is located at 1735 Oliver Street. Calumet College of St. Joseph is a private college affiliated with the Roman Catholic Church through the Missionaries of the Precious Blood. Its main campus is in Whiting, Indiana, with additional campuses located in Chicago, Illinois, and Merrillville, Indiana. The college was founded in 1951 as an extension of the now defunct Saint Joseph's College in Rensselaer, Indiana and currently enrolls 1,262 students.

== Infrastructure ==
=== Transportation ===
Amtrak's Wolverine stops at Hammond-Whiting station in nearby Hammond.

Airports serving Whiting are Chicago's O'Hare International Airport, Midway International Airport, and Gary/Chicago International Airport located in Gary, Indiana.

== Notes of interest ==
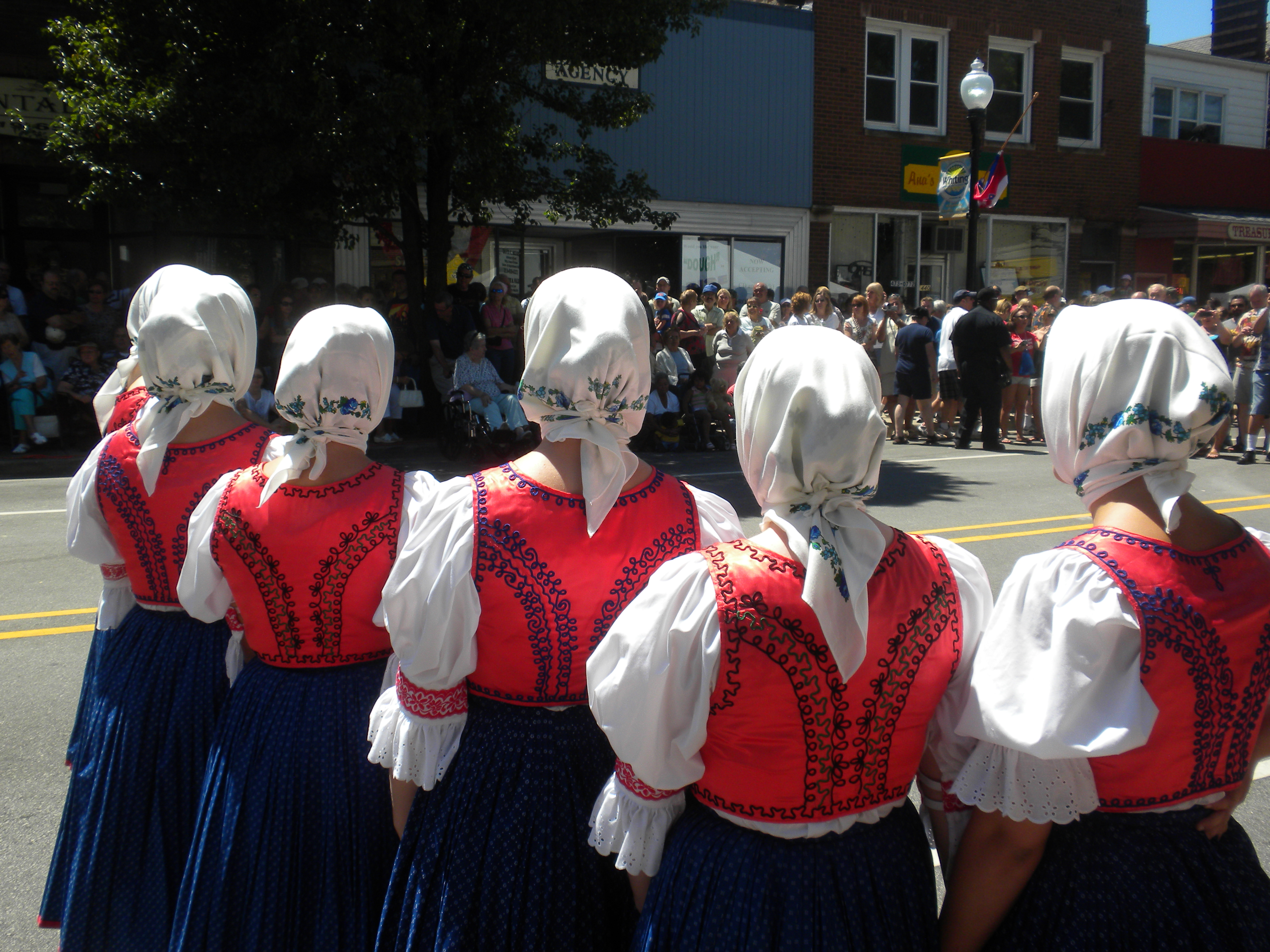
Polish Dancers at Pierogi Fest

Pierogi Fest founded in 1994 is held each year on 119th Street in downtown Whiting to honor the venerable pierogi dumpling. Spanning three days on Friday, Saturday, and Sunday during the last full weekend of July, the event draws in crowds from around the Calumet Region with guests coming from all over the globe.

The city was featured in an episode of MTV's High School Stories.

Scenes from the movie Rudy, starring Sean Astin, as well as the 1981 drama Four Friends, were shot in Whiting.

Standard Oil of Indiana, later Amoco, was founded and headquartered here.

The Mascot Hall of Fame, which was closed in 2025, honored costumed characters from college and professional sports, was located in Whiting.

== Notable people ==
- George Buksar, football player
- George Burman, football player
- William Merriam Burton, worked at the Standard Oil refinery in Whiting; became president of Standard Oil
- Mary-Lou Daniels, junior world champion tennis player
- Richard Dufallo, clarinetist, author, and conductor
- John M. Ford, science fiction and fantasy writer, game designer, and poet; raised in Whiting
- Joe Kopcha, football player
- Steve Kraly, baseball player
- Ferid Murad, co-recipient of 1998 Nobel Prize in Physiology or Medicine
- James J. Nejdl, State Senator and pioneer of Indiana Old-Age Pension Legislation. Former City council member, postmaster general, school board and public work board member.
- Al Pilarcik, baseball player
- Patrick Lucien Price, video game designer and editor; worked on Dungeons & Dragons game
- Irene Purcell, actress
- Joe Sotak, basketball player
- David Wagoner, poet

== See also ==
- Henry and Caroline Schrage House
