= 1939–40 Oshkosh All-Stars season =

NBL professional basketball team season

- Division champions
- Head coach: George Hotchkiss
- General manager: Lon Darling
- Owner: Lon Darling
- Arena: South Park School Gymnasium

Results
- Record: 15–13 (.536)
- Place: Division: T–1st (tied with Sheboygan Red Skins) (Western)
- Playoff finish: Lost NBL Championship to Akron Firestone Non-Skids, 3–2

The 1939–40 Oshkosh All-Stars season was the All-Stars' third professional year in the United States' National Basketball League (NBL), which was also the third year the league existed. However, if one were to include the independent seasons they played starting all the way back in 1929 before beginning to join the NBL in 1937 as the last inaugural NBL team to enter the new league, this would officially be their tenth season of play instead. The All-Stars played their home games at the South Park School Gymnasium in the South Park Middle School within the Oshkosh Area School District.

Unlike their first two seasons in the NBL, the All-Stars would start their season with a franchise-worst 0–5 record (which included an NBL low record of 15 total points scored in one match against the Detroit Eagles) and then a 1–6 record not long afterward (though they would end the 1930s decade with a 4–6 record due to Oshkosh getting a three-game winning streak to finish the 1939 year out on a more positive note). However, by the middle of January, the Oshkosh All-Stars would end up getting back on track with a winning record with a six-game winning streak from the end of December to the middle of January, though it wouldn't be more consistent until the later portions of that month thanks to not just the efforts of their star MVP Leroy Edwards, but also due to the added efforts of new teammate Charley Shipp (another player who would end up playing through every single season of the MBC/NBL's existence alongside Edwards) as well. For the rest of the season afterward, the All-Stars would be in direct competition with both the Sheboygan Red Skins and the new Chicago Bruins franchise (though the latter team would be one that was reinstated from the history they had within the rivaling American Basketball League) for not just winning the Western Division, but also obtaining one of the two playoff seeds in relation to it. While the competition for both of those positions in question would go down to the wire, it would ultimately end in a tie between the two Wisconsin-based teams in question for both the Western Division title in the regular season and the two Western Division playoff spots that were available in the NBL this season. However, because the All-Stars had the better scoring results between the two teams in their regular seasons matches played against each other since they tied the matches played (with Oshkosh scoring 182 total points over Sheboygan's 155 total points in the four matches played), the Oshkosh All-Stars would once again be named Western Division champions due to these tiebreaker rules, with them being considered the #1 seed there this season. With that being said, Sheboygan would be the team that would be given the homecourt advantage in the Western Division Playoff to make up for it this time around instead of Oshkosh.

Despite the awkward way the NBL decided upon who would be considered the Western Division's official winner and who would be the team with the home court advantage this time around, the All-Stars wouldn't mind the results too much in the end, as they would make easy work of Sheboygan in their sole home game there while making the road matches close matches in the other two games played against them, with Oshkosh ultimately winning the Western Division Playoff series 2–1. In their NBL Championship rematch that they would have against the Akron Firestone Non-Skids, Oshkosh looked to have the upper hand at first over the Akron squad representing Firestone's works team due to them winning their first two games they played in Oshkosh. However, once the series went out to Akron, Ohio for the better regular season team's home court advantage to kick into gear, the advantage would switch back into Akron's favor once again despite Oshkosh doing everything they could in each of the three remaining games played to make it not be the case. Despite the All-Stars fighting hard in every single game they could in these NBL Playoffs, Oshkosh would be victims of the first ever reverse sweep in the NBL Championship by losing the championship series 3–2 once again, with the decisive fifth game being played at the larger Wills Gymnasium in Kent State University out in nearby Kent, Ohio instead of Akron's typical Firestone Clubhouse or even the larger Goodyear Hall for the Goodyear team (which the Firestone team was allowed to do since their rivaling Akron Goodyear Wingfoots did not have anymore scheduled games left to play in their season). Despite the disappointing finish, for the third (and final) straight season in a row, Leroy Edwards would be named the NBL's MVP, with it also being the third of six seasons (five straight in a row) where he would be named a member of the All-NBL First Team and the third of many seasons (outside of some exhibition games in their previous two seasons as a barnstorming franchise) where Leroy Edwards would play with the Oshkosh All-Stars in the NBL. Not only that, but Edwards would also be joined by Charley Shipp in All-NBL First Team honors this season as well.

== Roster ==
1939–40 Oshkosh All-Stars roster
Players

Pos.	No.	Player	Height	Weight	DOB	From
F/C		Ray Adams	6 ft 2 in (1.88 m)	185 lb (84 kg)	1912–09–28	DePaul
F		Lou Barle	6 ft 1 in (1.85 m)	200 lb (91 kg)	1916–06–23	Minnesota Duluth
F		Buck Batterman	6 ft 3 in (1.91 m)	195 lb (88 kg)	1918–04–01	Wisconsin–Oshkosh
F/C		Connie Mack Berry	6 ft 3 in (1.91 m)	215 lb (98 kg)	1915–04–19	NC State
C		Leroy Edwards	6 ft 5 in (1.96 m)	210 lb (95 kg)	1914–04–11	Kentucky
F		Buzz Knoblauch	6 ft 1 in (1.85 m)	163 lb (74 kg)	1912–04–22	Carroll College
G/F		Karl Lillge	6 ft 0 in (1.83 m)	170 lb (77 kg)	1917–07–17	Appleton West HS (WI)
C		Dean Mealy	6 ft 4 in (1.93 m)	195 lb (88 kg)	1915–05–07	Muskingum
G		Tex Mueller	6 ft 1 in (1.85 m)	175 lb (79 kg)	1916–07–29	Western Colorado
F		Oscar Olson	6 ft 0 in (1.83 m)	165 lb (75 kg)	1916–03–31	Carleton College
F/C		Pete Pederson	6 ft 4 in (1.93 m)	200 lb (91 kg)	1910–10–28	Western Colorado
G/F		Scoop Putnam	6 ft 0 in (1.83 m)	175 lb (79 kg)	1912–09–08	Tennessee
G/F		Charley Shipp	6 ft 1 in (1.85 m)	200 lb (91 kg)	1913–12–03	Catholic
F/C		Walt Stanky	6 ft 3 in (1.91 m)	200 lb (91 kg)	1911–02–24	Erie HS (PA)?
G/F		Herm Witasek	6 ft 2 in (1.88 m)	210 lb (95 kg)	1913–10–16	North Dakota

Coaches
Head coach
- George Hotchkiss

Legend
- (DP) Unsigned draft pick
- (FA) Free agent
- (S) Suspended
- Injured

Roster

Note: Ray Adams, Buzz Knoblauch, Karl Lillge, Dean Mealy, Oscar Olson, and Herm Witasek were not on the playoff roster this season. In fact, Tex Mueller would not join the team for the 1940 World Professional Basketball Tournament, with his spot on the team during that event being replaced by both former Oshkosh All-Stars players Scott Armstrong and Ed Mullen.

== Regular season ==
=== Season standings ===
Pos.	Western Division	Wins	Losses	Win %
T–1	Oshkosh All-Stars	15	13	.536
T–1	Sheboygan Red Skins	15	13	.536
3	Chicago Bruins	14	14	.500
4	Hammond Ciesar All-Americans	9	19	.321

=== NBL Schedule ===
Not to be confused with exhibition or other non-NBL scheduled games that did not count towards Oshkosh's official NBL record for this season. An official database created by John Grasso detailing every NBL match possible (outside of two matches that the Kankakee Gallagher Trojans won over the Dayton Metropolitans in 1938) would be released in 2026 showcasing every team's official schedules throughout their time spent in the NBL. As such, these are the official results recorded for the Oshkosh All-Stars during their third season in the NBL.

- November 23, 1939 @ Oshkosh, WI: Akron Goodyear Wingfoots 39, Oshkosh All-Stars 33
- November 28, 1939 @ Detroit, MI: Oshkosh All-Stars 15, Detroit Eagles 23
- November 29, 1939 @ Oshkosh, WI: Akron Goodyear Wingfoots 42, Oshkosh All-Stars 34
- December 6, 1939 @ Chicago, IL: Oshkosh All-Stars 19, Chicago Bruins 28
- December 9, 1939 @ Oshkosh, WI: Akron Firestone Non-Skids 49, Oshkosh All-Stars 42
- December 16, 1939 @ Oshkosh, WI: Detroit Eagles 35, Oshkosh All-Stars 40
- December 21, 1939 @ Sheboygan, WI: Oshkosh All-Stars 29, Sheboygan Red Skins 37
- December 23, 1939 @ Oshkosh, WI: Sheboygan Red Skins 33, Oshkosh All-Stars 49
- December 24, 1939 @ Hammond, IN: Oshkosh All-Stars 47, Hammond Ciesar All-Americans 42
- December 30, 1939 @ Oshkosh, WI: Indianapolis Kautskys 49, Oshkosh All-Stars 60
- January 6, 1940 @ Oshkosh, WI: Akron Goodyear Wingfoots 39, Oshkosh All-Stars 44
- January 10, 1940 @ Akron, OH: Oshkosh All-Stars 49, Akron Firestone Non-Skids 47
- January 13, 1940 @ Oshkosh, WI: Detroit Eagles 37, Oshkosh All-Stars 60
- January 17, 1940 @ Indianapolis, IN: Oshkosh All-Stars 40, Indianapolis Kautskys 44
- January 18, 1940: Oshkosh All-Stars 51, Indianapolis Kautskys 47 (OT @ Jefferson, IN)
- January 20, 1940 @ Oshkosh, WI: Chicago Bruins 43, Oshkosh All-Stars 53
- January 27, 1940 @ Oshkosh, WI: Hammond Ciesar All-Americans 43, Oshkosh All-Stars 56
- January 30, 1940 @ Detroit, MI: Oshkosh All-Stars 30, Detroit Eagles 43
- January 31, 1940 @ Chicago, IL: Oshkosh All-Stars 33, Chicago Bruins 38
- February 3, 1940 @ Oshkosh, WI: Indianapolis Kautskys 49, Oshkosh All-Stars 56
- February 4, 1940 @ Hammond, IN: Oshkosh All-Stars 36, Hammond Ciesar All-Americans 37
- February 10, 1940 @ Oshkosh, WI: Hammond Ciesar All-Americans 32, Oshkosh All-Stars 38
- February 15, 1940 @ Sheboygan, WI: Oshkosh All-Stars 36, Sheboygan Red Skins 42
- February 17, 1940 @ Oshkosh, WI: Sheboygan Red Skins 43, Oshkosh All-Stars 68
- February 24, 1940 @ Oshkosh, WI: Chicago Bruins 41, Oshkosh All-Stars 57
- February 26, 1940 @ Akron, OH: Oshkosh All-Stars 39, Akron Firestone Non-Skids 41
- February 28, 1940 @ Akron, OH: Oshkosh All-Stars 35, Akron Goodyear Wingfoots 42
- March 2, 1940 @ Oshkosh, WI: Akron Firestone Non-Skids 41, Oshkosh All-Stars 46

== NBL Playoffs ==
=== NBL Western Division Playoff ===
(1/2W) Oshkosh All-Stars vs. (2/1W) Sheboygan Red Skins: Oshkosh wins series 2–1

- Game 1: March 5, 1940 @ Oshkosh: Oshkosh 41, Sheboygan 24
- Game 2: March 6, 1940 @ Sheboygan: Sheboygan 43, Oshkosh 42
- Game 3: March 7, 1940 @ Sheboygan: Oshkosh 31, Sheboygan 29

=== NBL Championship ===
(1(/2)W) Oshkosh All-Stars vs. (1E) Akron Firestone Non-Skids: Akron wins series 3–2

- Game 1: March 11, 1940 @ Oshkosh: Oshkosh 47, Akron 37
- Game 2: March 12, 1940 @ Oshkosh: Oshkosh 60, Akron 46
- Game 3: March 14, 1940 @ Akron: Akron 35, Oshkosh 32
- Game 4: March 15, 1940 @ Akron: Akron 41, Oshkosh 40
- Game 5: March 16, 1940 @ Akron: Akron 61, Oshkosh 60

=== Awards and honors ===
- NBL scoring leader – Leroy Edwards
- NBL Most Valuable Player – Leroy Edwards
- All-NBL First Team – Leroy Edwards and Charley Shipp
- NBL All-Time Team – Leroy Edwards and Charley Shipp

== World Professional Basketball Tournament ==
For the second year in a row, the Oshkosh All-Stars would participate in what could now be seen as the annual World Professional Basketball Tournament in Chicago, which the 1940 event was held on March 18–22, 1940 and was mostly held by independently ran teams alongside the Sheboygan Red Skins and Chicago Bruins from the NBL and the Washington Heurich Brewers from the rivaling American Basketball League. For the last game played in the first round of the WPBT this year, Oshkosh crushed their first round opponents once again, this time being the religion-based Brenton Harbor House of David, with a 42–23 blowout victory. As for their first ever quarterfinal round match that they would actually play in after previously having a bye in the inaugural tournament's quarterfinal round, the All-Stars would end up having an upset loss in overtime to the local Chicago Bruins, the one NBL team that missed out on the NBL Playoffs in the WPBT this season, through a close 40–38 overtime defeat. The Chicago Bruins would later go as far as the championship round themselves this time around, though much like the Oshkosh All-Stars before them, they would end up losing the championship round themselves, with Chicago losing that round to the world-famous Harlem Globetrotters instead of the all-black New York Renaissance that won the inaugural championship. Despite failing to return to the championship round of the WPBT this time around, Leroy Edwards would still be named a member of the All-Tournament Team for this season.

=== Games ===
- Won first round (42–23) over the Brenton Harbor House of David.
- Lost quarterfinal round (38–40) to the Chicago Bruins in overtime.

=== Awards and honors ===
- Leroy Edwards, All-Tournament Team
