= 1939–40 Detroit Eagles season =

NBL professional basketball team season

- Head coach: Gerry Archibald
- Owner: Gerry Archibald
- Arena: Brodhead Naval Armory

Results
- Record: 17–11 (.607)
- Place: Division: 2nd (Eastern)
- Playoff finish: Lost Eastern Division Playoff to the Akron Firestone Non-Skids, 2–1

The 1939–40 Detroit Eagles season was the third professional season of play for the Detroit Eagles franchise in the National Basketball League, which also was the third season that it existed as a professional basketball league after existing as a semi-pro or amateur basketball league called the Midwest Basketball Conference in its first two seasons in 1935. However, if one were to include their previous seasons where they started as a team in the Central Basketball League called the Warren Buckeyes in 1926 before becoming an independent team called the Warren Crescents, the Corry Keystones of the short-lived original NYPBL, the Warren Merchants, the Warren Transits, and the Warren HyVis Oilers (sometimes shortened down to the Warren HyVis Oils, including during the MBC's second and final season under that name when they entered the MBC that season) before becoming the Warren Penns in their first season of the NBL's official existence, this would officially be the franchise's fifteenth season of existence as a team, including the brief time they would be renamed to the Cleveland White Horses and the unofficial period of time they were known as the Elmira Colonels in the similarly short-lived revived New York-Pennsylvania Basketball League.

== Season overview ==
After moving from the small town of Warren, Pennsylvania to the larger city of Cleveland, Ohio on February 10, 1939, the previous season to go from the Warren Penns to the Cleveland White Horses for the rest of that season, the team under Gerry Archibald's ownership would once again move their operations in the 1939 year, this time before the start of the 1939–40 NBL season to Detroit, Michigan to remove the White Horse Motors' sponsorship they had from Cleveland to become the more independently focused Detroit Eagles for the rest of their existence, with Archibald retiring from playing for the team (though he would play for the independent National Transits team during the 1952–53 season when he was 45 years old long after both the NBL and the Eagles became defunct properties) to focus more on the team's ownership, general manager, and head coaching positions instead. The Eagles entered the season as a part of the Eastern Division for the third straight season in a row with eight total teams (four total teams representing both the Eastern and Western Divisions) representing the NBL for the second straight season in a row, with the only difference for this season involving the former original American Basketball League team known as the Chicago Bruins (owned by Chicago Bears NFL team owner George Halas) joining the NBL instead of returning to the revived version of the ABL (which still counts as a part of the original ABL) as the replacement team of the Pittsburgh Pirates NBL team, which led to the Indianapolis Kautskys being moved from the Western Division to the Eastern Division in the process.

Following their move from Cleveland to Detroit, the Eagles had their best ever record in NBL history with a 17–11 record (which came with a 5–0 start to their season), which was also the second-best record in the entire league, being two games behind the team that would best them in their division this season, the defending champion Akron Firestone Non-Skids. As such, the Detroit Eagles franchise would qualify for the NBL Playoffs this season for the first time in franchise history, which involved a divisional finals for the two divisions once again before entering a championship round after just having a championship series in the previous season. Detroit and the Firestone Non-Skids' final regular season game for this season would also become their first playoff match against each other in early March 1940 in Akron, Ohio, losing 48–35 to determine who had the best record between the two teams (and by extension, figure out who would be the #1 seed in the NBL this season). From there, the Eagles would split the first two games with the Akron squad that made it to the playoffs this season by winning their home match in Detroit before losing the third and final game in the series in Akron to the Firestone Non-Skids, with that Akron franchise later repeating their route as NBL champions this season (being one of three teams to ultimately do so throughout the NBL's own history). Following the season's end, Detroit would see Nat Frankel make it to the All-NBL Second Team. After this season's conclusion, the Eagles had initially left the NBL alongside the Indianapolis Kautskys to force the league to temporarily cut out divisional play entirely for the next few seasons, though Detroit would later return to the NBL in time to start out the 1940–41 NBL season.

== Roster ==
Please note that due to the way records for professional basketball leagues like the NBL and the ABL were recorded at the time, some information on both teams and players may be incomplete.

Player	Position
Nat Frankel	F-G
Laddie Gale	F
Bill Holland	C-F
Art Hyatt	G
Lou Jagnow	G
Buddy Jeannette	G
Bud Moodler	G
Bernard Opper	G
Eddie Parry	F-G
Walt Stanky	F-C
Irv Torgoff	F
Slim Wintermute	C

Note: Bud Moodler, Eddie Parry, and Walt Stanky were not a part of the playoff roster.

== Regular season ==
=== NBL Season standings ===
Pos.	Eastern Division	Wins	Losses	Win %
1	Akron Firestone Non-Skids	19	9	.679
2	Detroit Eagles	17	11	.607
3	Akron Goodyear Wingfoots	14	14	.500
4	Indianapolis Kautskys	9	19	.321

=== NBL Schedule ===
Not to be confused with exhibition or other non-NBL scheduled games that did not count towards Detroit's official NBL record for this season. An official database created by John Grasso detailing every NBL match possible (outside of two matches that the Kankakee Gallagher Trojans won over the Dayton Metropolitans in 1938) would be released in 2026 showcasing every team's official schedules throughout their time spent in the NBL. As such, these are the official results recorded for the Detroit Eagles during their third season (first season under the Detroit Eagles name) in the NBL.

- November 28, 1939 @ Detroit, MI: Oshkosh All-Stars 15, Detroit Eagles 23
- November 29, 1939 @ Indianapolis, IN: Detroit Eagles 44, Indianapolis Kautskys 40
- December 5, 1939 @ Detroit, MI: Akron Goodyear Wingfoots 36, Detroit Eagles 49
- December 9, 1939 @ Akron, OH: Detroit Eagles 36, Akron Goodyear Wingfoots 32
- December 12, 1939 @ Detroit, MI: Sheboygan Red Skins 38, Detroit Eagles 48
- December 13, 1939 @ Chicago, IL: Detroit Eagles 24, Chicago Bruins 34
- December 16, 1939 @ Oshkosh, WI: Detroit Eagles 35, Oshkosh All-Stars 40
- December 17, 1939 @ Hammond, IN: Detroit Eagles 53, Hammond Ciesar All-Americans 38
- December 19, 1939 @ Detroit, MI: Akron Firestone Non-Skids 35, Detroit Eagles 34
- December 23, 1939 @ Akron, OH: Detroit Eagles 36, Akron Firestone Non-Skids 41
- December 26, 1939 @ Detroit, MI: Chicago Bruins 31, Detroit Eagles 37
- January 2, 1940 @ Detroit, MI: Indianapolis Kautskys 26, Detroit Eagles 33
- January 9, 1940: Akron Goodyear Wingfoots 37, Detroit Eagles 43 (OT @ Detroit, MI)
- January 11, 1940 @ Sheboygan, WI: Detroit Eagles 33, Sheboygan Red Skins 41
- January 13, 1940 @ Oshkosh, WI: Detroit Eagles 37, Oshkosh All-Stars 60
- January 16, 1940 @ Detroit, MI: Hammond Ciesar All-Americans 32, Detroit Eagles 45
- January 17, 1940 @ Chicago, IL: Detroit Eagles 28, Chicago Bruins 36
- January 23, 1940 @ Detroit, MI: Sheboygan Red Skins 31, Detroit Eagles 40
- January 24, 1940 @ Indianapolis, IN: Detroit Eagles 42, Indianapolis Kautskys 39
- January 30, 1940 @ Detroit, MI: Oshkosh All-Stars 30, Detroit Eagles 43
- February 3, 1940 @ Akron, OH: Detroit Eagles 46, Akron Goodyear Wingfoots 39
- February 6, 1940 @ Detroit, MI: Akron Firestone Non-Skids 28, Detroit Eagles 42
- February 13, 1940 @ Detroit, MI: Indianapolis Kautskys 40, Detroit Eagles 63
- February 20, 1940 @ Detroit, MI: Hammond Ciesar All-Americans 43, Detroit Eagles 39
- February 22, 1940 @ Sheboygan, WI: Detroit Eagles 42, Sheboygan Red Skins 43
- February 25, 1940 @ Hammond, IN: Detroit Eagles 25, Hammond Ciesar All-Americans 31
- March 5, 1940 @ Detroit, MI: Chicago Bruins 53, Detroit Eagles 56
- March 6, 1940 @ Akron, OH: Detroit Eagles 35, Akron Firestone Non-Skids 48 (Was also both teams' first Eastern Division Playoff game against each other for this season, which was weirdly the only time the NBL allowed for both teams' final regular season games to also count as their first playoff game against each other.)

== NBL Playoffs ==
=== NBL Eastern Division Playoff ===
(2E) Detroit Eagles vs. (1E) Akron Firestone Non-Skids: Akron wins series 2–1

- Game 1: March 6, 1940 @ Akron: Akron 48, Detroit 35 (Was also both teams' final regular season games for this season, which was weirdly the only time the NBL allowed for both teams' final regular season games to also count as their first playoff game against each other.)
- Game 2: March 8, 1940 @ Detroit: Detroit 49, Akron 37
- Game 3: March 9, 1940 @ Akron: Akron 46, Detroit 35

=== Awards and honors ===
- Bart Quinn – All-NBL Second Team
- Buddy Jeannette – NBL All-Time Team
