= 1939–40 Indianapolis Kautskys season =

NBL professional basketball team season

- Head coach: Ward Meyers (player-coach)
- General manager: Frank Kautsky; Abe Goldsmith
- Owner(s): Frank Kautsky; Pete Bailey
- Arena: Butler Fieldhouse

Results
- Record: 9–19 (.321)
- Place: Division: 4th (Eastern)
- Playoff finish: Did not qualify

The 1939–40 Indianapolis Kautskys season was the third professional basketball season of play that the Kautskys franchise not only utilized that name for their team, but also played in the United States' National Basketball League (NBL), which was also the third year the league existed. However, if you include their previous three seasons where they played in predecessor leagues of sorts in the National Professional Basketball League and the Midwest Basketball Conference, as well as the couple of independent seasons they had in their history, then this was their seventh season of play as the Kautskys. This season marked the first and only time that the Kautskys were officially considered an Eastern Division team in the NBL instead of a Western Division team (when applicable) like they usually were considered to be there since the NBL still had eight teams competing in the league, with four of them being involved with both the Eastern and Western Divisions (with the only difference being that the Kautskys are competing in the Eastern Division for a change of pace this time around for this season). However, in order for the NBL to compensate for the Indianapolis, Indiana-based Kautskys being moved from the Western Division to the Eastern Division this season, the formerly existing Warren Penns turned Cleveland White Horses (and unofficially existing to the NBL Elmira Colonels) officially moved from Cleveland, Ohio to Detroit, Michigan to become the Detroit Eagles by the start of this season and the former original American Basketball League team known as the Chicago Bruins (owned by Chicago Bears NFL owner George Halas) joined the NBL in Chicago, Illinois (partially to help set up the NBL's new headquarters out of Akron, Ohio and into the city of Chicago for most of its life going forward) instead of the revived version of the ABL (which still counts as a part of the original ABL) as the replacement team of the Pittsburgh Pirates NBL team in Pittsburgh, Pennsylvania. This season also saw them replace one-time head coach Bob Nipper with Ward Meyers as the team's player-coach for the season instead.

Throughout this season, the Kautskys saw lousy play affect their team, as they were without star guard John Wooden due to him retiring as a player to focus more on his teaching career (which later included him being a head coach for UCLA). After starting the season with a 2–1 record, the Kautskys ended the 1930s decade with a 3–6 record for the season (winning their last game played on New Year's Eve in 1939) before continuing on with more poor play from them throughout the season. By the time their season was over at around the start of March, the Kautskys ended up with a 9–19 record, which gave them the worst record in the entire Eastern Division. In spite of the poor record they got, the Kautskys still saw Ernie Andres (a future Boston Red Sox player) be named a member of the All-NBL Second Team this season. Following this season's end, the Indianapolis Kautskys experimented with operating as a barnstorming franchise (likely due in part to them playing some of their home games outside of Indianapolis (but within Indiana), such as in Lebanon, Jefferson, Kokomo, and Terre Haute), meaning they ended up leaving the NBL in the process (and subsequently result in the NBL abandoning the usage of divisions entirely for the next four seasons afterward). Despite that notion, however, the Kautskys would end up returning to the NBL for the following season afterward, albeit on what was later seen as a temporary basis by that point in time due to the effects of World War II.

== Roster ==
1939–40 Indianapolis Kautskys roster
Players

Pos.	No.	Player	Height	Weight	DOB	From
G/F		Ernie Andres	6 ft 1 in (1.85 m)	200 lb (91 kg)	1920–05–11	Indiana
F/C		Scott Armstrong	6 ft 4 in (1.93 m)	190 lb (86 kg)	1913–10–12	Butler
G/F		Frank Baird	5 ft 11 in (1.80 m)	160 lb (73 kg)	1912–04–10	Butler
F/C		Jim Birr	6 ft 3 in (1.91 m)	215 lb (98 kg)	1916–08–22	Indiana
F/C		George Chestnut	6 ft 5 in (1.96 m)	210 lb (95 kg)	1911–09–27	Indiana State
F/C		Gene Cramer	6 ft 1 in (1.85 m)	195 lb (88 kg)	1915–07–13	Martinsville HS (IN)
F		Garland Lewis	6 ft 4 in (1.93 m)	190 lb (86 kg)	1912–04–27	Kentucky
F/C		Ward Meyers	6 ft 1 in (1.85 m)	185 lb (84 kg)	1908–04–19	Unknown
G		Rube Reiswerg	5 ft 8 in (1.73 m)	175 lb (79 kg)	1912–08–10	Charles E. Emmerich Manual Training HS (IN)
G		Eddie Sadowski	5 ft 10 in (1.78 m)	175 lb (79 kg)	1915–02–02	Notre Dame
G/F		John Sines	6 ft 1 in (1.85 m)	190 lb (86 kg)	1914–08–13	Purdue
G		Marvin Stout	5 ft 11 in (1.80 m)	155 lb (70 kg)	1915–08–06	Ball State
G		Sally Suddith	6 ft 1 in (1.85 m)	170 lb (77 kg)	1910–12–26	Indiana
F/C		Homer Thompson	6 ft 4 in (1.93 m)	215 lb (98 kg)	1916–01–18	Kentucky
C		Dave Williams	6 ft 3 in (1.91 m)	210 lb (95 kg)	1913–02–17	Indianapolis
G/F		Jewell Young	6 ft 0 in (1.83 m)	160 lb (73 kg)	1913–01–18	Purdue

Coaches
Head coach
- Ward Meyers

Legend
- (DP) Unsigned draft pick
- (FA) Free agent
- (S) Suspended
- Injured

Roster

== Regular season ==
=== NBL Schedule ===
Not to be confused with exhibition or other non-NBL scheduled games that did not count towards Indianapolis' official NBL record for this season. An official database created by John Grasso detailing every NBL match possible (outside of two matches that the Kankakee Gallagher Trojans won over the Dayton Metropolitans in 1938) would be released in 2026 showcasing every team's official schedules throughout their time spent in the NBL. As such, these are the official results recorded for the Indianapolis Kautskys during their third season in the NBL under that name for the league.

- November 29, 1939 @ Indianapolis, IN: Detroit Eagles 44, Indianapolis Kautskys 40
- December 6, 1939 @ Indianapolis, IN: Akron Firestone Non-Skids 33, Indianapolis Kautskys 39
- December 13, 1939 @ Indianapolis, IN: Sheboygan Red Skins 34, Indianapolis Kautskys 37
- December 20, 1939 @ Indianapolis, IN: Detroit Eagles 31, Indianapolis Kautskys 17
- December 23, 1939 @ Akron, OH: Indianapolis Kautskys 43, Akron Goodyear Wingfoots 49
- December 27, 1939 @ Indianapolis, IN: Chicago Bruins 33, Indianapolis Kautskys 41
- December 28, 1939 @ Sheboygan, WI: Indianapolis Kautskys 36, Sheboygan Red Skins 42
- December 30, 1939 @ Oshkosh, WI: Indianapolis Kautskys 49, Oshkosh All-Stars 60
- December 31, 1939 @ Hammond, IN: Indianapolis Kautskys 32, Hammond Ciesar All-Americans 30
- January 2, 1940 @ Detroit, MI: Indianapolis Kautskys 26, Detroit Eagles 33
- January 4, 1940 @ Lebanon, IN: Hammond Ciesar All-Americans 28, Indianapolis Kautskys 58
- January 7, 1940 @ Akron, OH: Indianapolis Kautskys 55, Akron Firestone Non-Skids 63
- January 10, 1940 @ Chicago, IL: Indianapolis Kautskys 47, Chicago Bruins 45
- January 17, 1940 @ Indianapolis, IN: Oshkosh All-Stars 40, Indianapolis Kautskys 44
- January 18, 1940: Oshkosh All-Stars 51, Indianapolis Kautskys 47 (OT @ Jefferson, IN)
- January 20, 1940 @ Akron, OH: Indianapolis Kautskys 51, Akron Goodyear Wingfoots 40
- January 21, 1940 @ Akron, OH: Indianapolis Kautskys 52, Akron Firestone Non-Skids 46
- January 24, 1940 @ Indianapolis, IN: Detroit Eagles 42, Indianapolis Kautskys 39
- January 28, 1940 @ Hammond, IN: Indianapolis Kautskys 33, Hammond Ciesar All-Americans 48
- January 31, 1940 @ Indianapolis, IN: Indianapolis Kautskys 44, Akron Goodyear Wingfoots 54
- February 3, 1940 @ Oshkosh, WI: Indianapolis Kautskys 49, Oshkosh All-Stars 56
- February 4, 1940 @ Sheboygan WI: Indianapolis Kautskys 36, Sheboygan Red Skins 44
- February 13, 1940 @ Detroit, MI: Indianapolis Kautskys 40, Detroit Eagles 63
- February 14, 1940 @ Indianapolis, IN: Hammond Ciesar All-Americans 48, Indianapolis Kautskys 41
- February 21, 1940 @ Kokomo, IN: Akron Firestone Non-Skids 53, Indianapolis Kautskys 50
- February 22, 1940 @ Terre Haute, IN: Chicago Bruins 57, Indianapolis Kautskys 58
- February 24, 1940 @ Indianapolis, IN: Sheboygan Red Skins 40, Indianapolis Kautskys 44
- March 2, 1940 @ Chicago, IL: Indianapolis Kautskys 34, Chicago Bruins 50

=== Season standings ===
Pos.	Eastern Division	Wins	Losses	Win %
1	Akron Firestone Non-Skids	19	9	.679
2	Detroit Eagles	17	11	.607
3	Akron Goodyear Wingfoots	14	14	.500
4	Indianapolis Kautskys	9	19	.321

== Awards and honors ==
- All-NBL Second Team – Ernie Andres
