= 1939–40 Akron Goodyear Wingfoots season =

NBL professional basketball team season

- Head coach: Ray Detrick
- Owner: Goodyear
- Arena: Goodyear Hall

Results
- Record: 14–14 (.500)
- Place: Division: 3rd (Eastern)
- Playoff finish: Did not qualify

The 1939–40 Akron Goodyear Wingfoots season was the Goodyear Wingfoots' third year in the United States' National Basketball League (NBL), which was also the third year the league existed. However, if you include their previous seasons of existence as an independent team, alongside seasons where they competed in the Amateur Athletic Union, the National Industrial League (not to be confused with the National Industrial Basketball League that they would later compete in, with the Goodyear Wingfoots winning a championship in the NIL in 1932), and what were considered predecessors to the NBL in the National Professional Basketball League and the Midwest Basketball Conference (the latter of which the Goodyear Wingfoots won that league's final championship under that name before it folded operations and was considered to be rebranded as the NBL according to some basketball historians), this season would officially be considered their 22nd season of play as a team. Eight official teams competed in the NBL (though not the exact same eight teams from the previous season due to the Chicago Bruins replacing the Pittsburgh Pirates and the Cleveland White Horses moving from Cleveland to Detroit to become the Detroit Eagles), comprising four teams in the Eastern Division (Akron Goodyear's division) and four teams in the Western Division. The Wingfoots were one of two teams from Akron, Ohio in the league, with the other being the Akron Firestone Non-Skids.

The Wingfoots played their home games at the Goodyear Hall. Not only that, but they replaced head coach Lefty Byers with Ray Detrick for the rest of the franchise's existence up in the NBL. For the second straight season in a row, they finished their NBL season with an average 14–14 record. However, unlike their previous season, where they were tied with the Warren Penns / Cleveland White Horses for a second-place finish (yet couldn't enter the NBL Playoffs due to uniquely unknown circumstances for that season), the Goodyear Wingfoots would end up placing in third place behind the Detroit Eagles and the league's eventual champions, the cityside rivaling Akron Firestone Non-Skids, meaning the Goodyear squad would fail to qualify for the NBL Playoffs for the second straight season in a row. Despite the repeated failure to return to the NBL Playoffs this season, the Goodyear Wingfoots would see Ben Stephens not only be named the NBL's Rookie of the Year, but also be named a member of the All-NBL First Team as well.

== Roster ==
1939–40 Akron Goodyear Wingfoots roster
Players

Pos.	No.	Player	Height	Weight	DOB	From
G/F		Gene Anderson	6 ft 2 in (1.88 m)	190 lb (86 kg)	1917–10–05	Purdue
G		Chuck Bloedorn	6 ft 0 in (1.83 m)	180 lb (82 kg)	1912–05–28	Illinois Tech
C		Floyd Ebaugh	6 ft 7 in (2.01 m)	230 lb (104 kg)	1914–05–30	Nebraska
F/C		Wilbur Fox	6 ft 5 in (1.96 m)	185 lb (84 kg)	1919–01–19	Dover HS (OH)
G/F		Nick Frascella	6 ft 2 in (1.88 m)	185 lb (84 kg)	1914–07–06	Wooster
F/C		Joel Hitt	6 ft 2 in (1.88 m)	180 lb (82 kg)	1916–12–30	Mississippi Christian
G/F		Bill Lloyd	6 ft 2 in (1.88 m)	180 lb (82 kg)	1915–12–16	St. John's
G		Johnny McAdams	5 ft 10 in (1.78 m)	147 lb (67 kg)	1912–04–15	Ohio Wesleyan
F/C		Jim Montgomery	6 ft 3 in (1.91 m)	190 lb (86 kg)	1915–04–13	Villanova
F/C		Ray Morstadt	6 ft 2 in (1.88 m)	220 lb (100 kg)	1913–03–10	Marquette
G/F		Jake Nagode	6 ft 2 in (1.88 m)	170 lb (77 kg)	1915–07–11	Northwestern
G/F		Ben Stephens	6 ft 0 in (1.83 m)	175 lb (79 kg)	1916–11–27	Iowa
G		Howard Vocke	6 ft 0 in (1.83 m)	190 lb (86 kg)	1915–03–16	St. John's

Coaches
Head coach
- Ray Detrick

Legend
- (DP) Unsigned draft pick
- (FA) Free agent
- (S) Suspended
- Injured

Roster

== Regular season ==
=== Season standings ===
Pos.	Eastern Division	Wins	Losses	Win %
1	Akron Firestone Non-Skids	19	9	.679
2	Detroit Eagles	17	11	.607
3	Akron Goodyear Wingfoots	14	14	.500
4	Indianapolis Kautskys	9	19	.321

=== NBL Schedule ===
Not to be confused with exhibition or other non-NBL scheduled games that did not count towards Akron's official NBL record for this season. An official database created by John Grasso detailing every NBL match possible (outside of two matches that the Kankakee Gallagher Trojans won over the Dayton Metropolitans in 1938) would be released in 2026 showcasing every team's official schedules throughout their time spent in the NBL. As such, these are the official results recorded for the Akron Goodyear Wingfoots during their third season in the NBL under that name for the league.

- November 22, 1939 @ Sheboygan, WI: Akron Goodyear Wingfoots 37, Sheboygan Red Skins 32
- November 23, 1939 @ Oshkosh, WI: Akron Goodyear Wingfoots 39, Oshkosh All-Stars 33
- November 29, 1939 @ Oshkosh, WI: Akron Goodyear Wingfoots 42, Oshkosh All-Stars 34
- December 5, 1939 @ Detroit, MI: Akron Goodyear Wingfoots 36, Detroit Eagles 49
- December 9, 1939 @ Akron, OH: Detroit Eagles 36, Akron Goodyear Wingfoots 32
- December 16, 1939 @ Akron, OH: Sheboygan Red Skins 45, Akron Goodyear Wingfoots 36
- December 20, 1939 @ Indianapolis, IN: Akron Goodyear Wingfoots 31, Indianapolis Kautskys 17
- December 23, 1939 @ Akron, OH: Indianapolis Kautskys 43, Akron Goodyear Wingfoots 49
- December 30, 1939 @ Akron, OH: Chicago Bruins 23, Akron Goodyear Wingfoots 32
- January 3, 1940 @ Chicago, IL: Akron Goodyear Wingfoots 30, Chicago Bruins 37
- January 4, 1940 @ Sheboygan, WI: Akron Goodyear Wingfoots 22, Sheboygan Red Skins 24
- January 6, 1940 @ Oshkosh, WI: Akron Goodyear Wingfoots 39, Oshkosh All-Stars 44
- January 7, 1940 @ Hammond, IN: Akron Goodyear Wingfoots 33, Hammond Ciesar All-Americans 31
- January 9, 1940: Akron Goodyear Wingfoots 37, Detroit Eagles 43 (OT @ Detroit, MI)
- January 13, 1940 @ Akron, OH: Akron Firestone Non-Skids 47, Akron Goodyear Wingfoots 37
- January 18, 1940 @ Akron, OH: Hammond Ciesar All-Americans 31, Akron Goodyear Wingfoots 47
- January 20, 1940 @ Akron, OH: Indianapolis Kautskys 40, Akron Goodyear Wingfoots 51
- January 25, 1940 @ Akron, OH: Sheboygan Red Skins 31, Akron Goodyear Wingfoots 28
- January 27, 1940 @ Akron, OH: Akron Firestone Non-Skids 39, Akron Goodyear Wingfoots 38
- January 31, 1940 @ Indianapolis, IN: Akron Goodyear Wingfoots 54, Indianapolis Kautskys 44
- February 3, 1940 @ Akron, OH: Detroit Eagles 46, Akron Goodyear Wingfoots 39
- February 5, 1940 @ Akron, OH: Chicago Bruins 25, Akron Goodyear Wingfoots 39
- February 10, 1940 @ Akron, OH: Akron Firestone Non-Skids 46, Akron Goodyear Wingfoots 32
- February 14, 1940 @ Chicago, IL: Akron Goodyear Wingfoots 37, Chicago Bruins 34
- February 18, 1940 @ Hammond, IN: Akron Goodyear Wingfoots 35, Hammond Ciesar All-Americans 48
- February 21, 1940 @ Akron, OH: Hammond Ciesar All-Americans 36, Akron Goodyear Wingfoots 37
- February 24, 1940 @ Akron, OH: Akron Firestone Non-Skids 46, Akron Goodyear Wingfoots 36
- February 28, 1940 @ Akron, OH: Oshkosh All-Stars 35, Akron Goodyear Wingfoots 42

== NBL Playoffs ==
Despite finishing the season with an average 14–14 record, due to their third-place finish in the Eastern Division behind the Detroit Eagles and their inner city rivals, the defending NBL champion Akron Firestone Non-Skids, the Akron Goodyear Wingfoots would miss out on the NBL Playoffs for the second straight season in a row.

== Awards and honors ==
- NBL Rookie of the Year – Ben Stephens
- First Team All-NBL – Ben Stephens
- All-Time NBL Team – Ben Stephens
