= 1938–39 Warren Penns / Cleveland White Horses season =

NBL & NYPBL professional basketball team season

- Head coach: Gerry Archibald (player-coach)
- Owner: Gerry Archibald
- Arena: Beaty Jr. High Gym (Warren Penns); Cleveland Arena (Cleveland White Horses)

Results
- Record: 14–14 (.500)
- Place: Division: T–2nd (Tied with Akron Goodyear Wingfoots) (Eastern)
- Playoff finish: Did not qualify (Warren moved to Cleveland; no playoffs outside of the NBL Championship series matchup this year)

1938–39 Elmira Colonels season
- League champions
- Division champions
- League: New York-Pennsylvania; Basketball League
- Head coach: Gerry Archibald (player-coach)
- Arena: Unknown (Clemens Center?)

Results
- Record: 17–9 (.654)
- Place: Division: T–1st (Tied with Hazleton Mountaineers)
- Playoff finish: Won New York-Pennsylvania Basketball League championship (as the Elmira Colonels) 3–1 over the Pittston Independents

The 1938–39 Warren Penns / Cleveland White Horses season was the second professional season of play for the Warren Penns turned Cleveland White Horses franchise in the National Basketball League, which also was the second season that it existed as a professional basketball league after existing as a semi-pro or amateur basketball league called the Midwest Basketball Conference in its first two seasons back in 1935. This would also be the franchise's only season where they would also compete as the Elmira Colonels in the short-lived New York-Pennsylvania Basketball League (which was considered more of a minor league where cages were put into place for the out of bounds area within the basketball court instead of the more professional-standing NBL), in which the team would win the championship for that specific league only. In any case, this would officially be the team's fourteenth season of existence after they first started in the Central Basketball League called the Warren Buckeyes in 1926 before becoming an independent team called the Warren Crescents, the Corry Keystones of the short-lived original NYPBL, the Warren Merchants, and the Warren Transits before becoming the Warren HyVis Oils (sometimes being expanded out more into the Warren HyVis Oilers instead) up until joining the MBC before becoming the Warren Penns upon their initial entry into the NBL.

== Season overview ==
The franchise would start their season in Warren, Pennsylvania at the Beaty Jr. High Gym in the Warren County School District while keeping their HyVis (Penn) Oil sponsorship team name in the process of their season as it went on, with them also entering this season as a part of the Eastern Division for the second season in a row with only eight total teams (four total teams representing both the Eastern and Western Divisions) representing the NBL following the subtraction of six teams (seven if you make the Richmond King Clothiers and Cincinnati Comellos become separate franchises instead of one whole franchise during that season) and the late addition of the Sheboygan Red Skins. However, by early February 1939, team owner (and player-coach) Gerry Archibald would end up acquiring a new sponsorship brand agreement from White Horse Motors in Cleveland, Ohio, which led to Archibald moving the franchise from the small location of Warren to the much larger area of Cleveland by February 10, 1939, after going 9–10 in what turned out to be the franchise's final games played while representing the city of Warren. In what later became the franchise's only games played in Cleveland under the White Horses team brand name, they would end up going 5–4 to finish their second season in the NBL with a 14–14 record, with one of their wins including a victory earned by a forfeit coming from the Hammond Ciesar All-Americans on March 5, 1939.

While the Penns turned White Horses' record would be tied with the defending champion Akron Goodyear Wingfoots for a second-place finish in their division and would normally constitute them qualifying for the 1939 NBL Playoffs (or at least constitute some sort of tiebreaker in mind for the second place spot), the playoffs for the NBL in this season would only constitute in a championship match-up between the best teams of the Eastern Division (the Akron Firestone Non-Skids) and Western Division (the Oshkosh All-Stars) in part due to the NBL being cut to four teams in each division for this season and partially due to the NBL probably avoiding any extra costs in playoff games by hosting a tiebreaker game (or series) for who would be the official #2 seed in the Eastern Division this season since the Western Division already saw the Indianapolis Kautskys get confirmed to be the second-best team behind Oshkosh that season without much issue.

The franchise also competed in the New York-Pennsylvania Basketball League (not related to the original NYPBL that went under by January 1926) under its second and final season of existence alongside the NBL as the Elmira Colonels (not to be confused with the future Elmira Colonels team of the rivaling American Basketball League) out in Elmira, New York, with the team winning that league's championship under the Elmira Colonels name 3–1 over the team hosted in Pittston, Pennsylvania (with the NYPBL being one of the last leagues to ever utilize cages of sorts to barricade the basketball court during basketball's early history as a sport). This would be done to help give the franchise extra revenue compared to what they would have gotten had they only played in the NBL that season. Following this season's conclusion, the White Horses franchise would move once again after seeing that the money made in Cleveland was surprisingly minimal compared to what they had done in Pennsylvania, this time moving the franchise to Detroit, Michigan to become the Detroit Eagles for the rest of their existence.

== Roster ==
Please note that due to the way records for professional basketball leagues like the NBL and the ABL were recorded at the time, some information on both teams and players may be incomplete.

Player	Position
Gerry Archibald	G
Bill Holland	F-C
Art Hyatt	G
Buddy Jeannette	G
Bill Laughlin	F
Joe Leson	C-F
Frank Maury	G
Johnny Pawk	F
Walt Stanky	F-C
Reno Strand	G-F

It's ultimately unknown as of 2026 as to which players played for the Warren Penns only, which players played for the Cleveland White Horses only, and which players played for both Warren and Cleveland in the NBL (though most of the players on this team have played for both Warren and Cleveland), never mind who may or may not have played for the team while they operated as the Elmira Colonels in the NYPBL. However, it would be confirmed that at least one player would play for the Elmira Colonels only, with Nat Passon (youngest brother of Philadelphia Sphas players Herman "Chickie" Passon and Harry Passon) playing only for the Elmira Colonels franchise in the NYPBL over either one of the Warren Penns or Cleveland White Horses franchises out in the NBL.

== Regular season ==
=== NBL Season standings ===
Pos.	Eastern Division	Wins	Losses	Win %
1	Akron Firestone Non-Skids	24	3	.889
T–2	Akron Goodyear Wingfoots	14	14	.500
T–2	Warren Penns / Cleveland White Horses^{‡}	14	14	.500
4	Pittsburgh Pirates	13	14	.481
^{‡} Warren relocated to Cleveland during the season and assumed Warren's record in the standings. Warren's record was 9–10 and Cleveland's record was 5–4.

==== NBL Schedule ====
Most of their NBL games refer to the team as the Warren Penns before later referring to them as the Cleveland White Horses for the rest of the NBL season going forward. Also, this does not mention games they played while going under the Elmira Colonels moniker for the New York-Pennsylvania Basketball League.

- November 28, 1938 @ Warren, PA: Hammond Ciesar All-Americans 28, Warren Penns 48
- December 3, 1938: Warren Penns 38, Oshkosh All-Stars 37 (OT @ Oshkosh, WI)
- December 4, 1938 @ Sheboygan, WI: Warren Penns 34, Sheboygan Red Skins 46
- December 8, 1938 @ Warren, PA: Akron Firestone Non-Skids 45, Warren Penns 32
- December 12, 1938 @ Indianapolis, IN: Warren Penns 37, Indianapolis Kautskys 39
- December 13, 1938 @ Warren, PA: Indianapolis Kautskys 41, Warren Penns 43
- December 14, 1938 @ Akron, OH: Warren Penns 21, Akron Goodyear Wingfoots 35
- December 15, 1938 @ Warren, PA: Akron Goodyear Wingfoots 27, Warren Penns 34
- December 22, 1938 @ Warren, PA: Sheboygan Red Skins 26, Warren Penns 24
- December 29, 1938 @ Warren, PA: Hammond Ciesar All-Americans 41, Warren Penns 48
- January 2, 1939 @ Hammond, IN: Warren Penns 35, Hammond Ciesar All-Americans 36
- January 5, 1939 @ Warren, PA: Indianapolis Kautskys 47, Warren Penns 48
- January 12, 1939 @ Warren, PA: Pittsburgh Pirates 29, Warren Penns 27
- January 14, 1939 @ Warren, PA: Akron Goodyear Wingfoots 33, Warren Penns 29
- January 19, 1939 @ Warren, PA: Akron Goodyear Wingfoots 36, Warren Penns 39
- January 26, 1939 @ Warren, PA: Oshkosh All-Stars 39, Warren Penns 43
- February 1, 1939 @ Pittsburgh, PA: Warren Penns 43, Pittsburgh Pirates 51
- February 8, 1939 @ Akron, OH: Warren Penns 39, Akron Firestone Non-Skids 52
- February 9, 1939 @ Cleveland, OH: Sheboygan Red Skins 33, Warren Penns 37
- February 15, 1939 @ Pittsburgh, PA: Cleveland White Horses 32, Pittsburgh Pirates 34
- February 17, 1939 @ Cleveland, OH: Akron Firestone Non-Skids 32, Cleveland White Horses 29
- February 28, 1939: Oshkosh All-Stars 28, Cleveland White Horses 30 (2OT @ Cleveland, OH)
- March 2, 1939 @ Cleveland, OH: Pittsburgh Pirates 38, Cleveland White Horses 49
- March 5, 1939 @ Hammond, IN: The Cleveland White Horses would win over the Hammond Ciesar All-Americans by forfeiture. (As such, 2–0 favoring the Cleveland White Horses would be the official recorded score for this match.)
- March 8, 1939 @ Akron, OH: Akron Firestone Non-Skids 42, Cleveland White Horses 48
- March 9, 1939 @ Cleveland, OH: Indianapolis Kautskys 72, Cleveland White Horses 52
- March 11, 1939 @ Oshkosh, WI: Cleveland White Horses 39, Oshkosh All-Stars 43
- March 12, 1939 @ Sheboygan, WI: Cleveland White Horses 51, Sheboygan Red Skins 45

=== NYPBL Season standings ===
Pos.	Team	Wins	Losses	Win %
T–1	Elmira Colonels (Warren Penns / Cleveland White Horses)	17	9	.654
T–1	Hazleton	17	9	.654
3	Binghamton	16	10	.615
T–4	Pittston	15	11	.577
T–4	Tunkhannock	15	11	.577
6	Archbald	9	17	.346
7	Dunmore†	4	9	.308
8	Plymouth†	3	20	.130

† – Did not survive the NYPBL season. (Dunmore & Plymouth both dropped out on January 16, 1939, but Plymouth decided to forfeit their last five games of the season automatically, while Dunmore just left the season as it was for their season.)

== NBL Playoffs ==
Despite finishing the season under a tied second-place finish with the defending NBL champion Akron Goodyear Wingfoots, the Warren Penns turned Cleveland White Horses would not qualify for the 1939 NBL Playoffs (which was just a championship series match-up this time around between the two best teams of the entire league in terms of records in each division, the Akron Firestone Non-Skids and the Oshkosh All-Stars).

== NYPBL Playoffs ==
=== NYPBL First Place Tiebreaker ===
Tiebreaker Game: @ Elmira – Elmira Colonels defeat Hazleton Mountaineers 37–25 for first-place finish.

=== NYPBL Semifinals ===
(1) Elmira Colonels vs. (3) Binghamton Triplets: Elmira wins series 2–1

- Game 1 @ Elmira: Elmira 29, Binghamton 26
- Game 2 @ Binghamton: Binghamton 31, Elmira 29
- Game 3 @ Elmira: Elmira 30, Binghamton 25

=== NYPBL Championship ===
(1) Elmira Colonels vs. (4) Pittston Independents: Elmira wins series 2–1

- Game 1 @ Elmira: Elmira 31, Pittston 23
- Game 2 @ Pittston: Pittston 39, Elmira 32
- Game 3 @ Elmira: Elmira 44, Pittston 25

== Awards and honors ==
- Buddy Jeannette – NBL All-Time Team
