= List of NBA players (L) =

This is a list of National Basketball Association players whose last names begin with L.

The list also includes players from the American National Basketball League (NBL), the Basketball Association of America (BAA), and the original American Basketball Association (ABA). All of these leagues contributed to the formation of the present-day NBA.

Individuals who played in the NBL prior to its 1949 merger with the BAA are listed in italics, as they are not traditionally listed in the NBA's official player registers.

== L ==
- Skal Labissière
- Reggie Lacefield
- Sam Lacey
- Bob Lackey
- Fred LaCour
- Edgar Lacy
- Wendell Ladner
- Christian Laettner
- Oliver Lafayette
- Raef LaFrentz
- Tom LaGarde
- Bill Laimbeer
- Nick Lalich
- Pete Lalich
- Gene Lalley
- Bo Lamar
- Anthony Lamb
- Doron Lamb
- Jeremy Lamb
- John Lambert
- Buck Lamme
- Jeff Lamp
- Maciej Lampe
- Jim Lampley
- Sean Lampley
- Jock Landale
- Carl Landry
- Marcus Landry
- Mark Landsberger
- Bill Lane
- Jerome Lane
- Andrew Lang
- Antonio Lang
- James Lang
- Trajan Langdon
- Dick Lange
- Keith Langford
- Romeo Langford
- Dan Langhi
- Bob Lanier
- Chaz Lanier
- Stu Lantz
- Nicolás Laprovíttola
- Jake LaRavia
- York Larese
- Shane Larkin
- Pelle Larsson
- Rusty LaRue
- Rudy LaRusso
- John Laskowski
- Stephane Lasme
- Dave Latter
- Dave Lattin
- Priest Lauderdale
- Bill Laughlin
- Rich Laurel
- Harry Laurie
- Walt Lautenbach
- Rube Lautenschlager
- Joffrey Lauvergne
- Tony Lavelli
- Zach LaVine
- Bob Lavoy
- Acie Law
- Vic Law
- Gani Lawal
- Tobi Lawal
- Edmund Lawrence
- Tim Lawry
- A. J. Lawson
- Jason Lawson
- Ty Lawson
- Jake Layman
- Mo Layton
- T. J. Leaf
- Manny Leaks
- Hal Lear
- Allen Leavell
- Jeff Lebo
- Eric Leckner
- Jalen Lecque
- Ricky Ledo
- Butch Lee
- Clyde Lee
- Courtney Lee
- Damion Lee
- Dave Lee
- David Lee
- Dick Lee
- Doug Lee
- George Lee
- Greg Lee
- Keith Lee
- Kurk Lee
- Malcolm Lee
- Rock Lee
- Ron Lee
- Russ Lee
- Saben Lee
- Ed Leede
- Sew Leeka
- Hank Lefkowitz
- Tim Legler
- George Lehmann
- Barry Leibowitz
- Walt Lemon Jr.
- Alex Len
- Voshon Lenard
- Yaxel Lendeborg
- Johnny Lenhart
- Leary Lentz
- Bobby Leonard
- Gary Leonard
- Kawhi Leonard
- Meyers Leonard
- Malevy Leons
- Jim Les
- Travis Leslie
- Ronnie Lester
- Clifford Lett
- Jon Leuer
- Andrew Levane
- Fat Lever
- Caris LeVert
- Sid Levine
- Cliff Levingston
- Ed Lewinski
- Bobby Lewis
- Cedric Lewis
- Fred Lewis
- Freddie Lewis
- Garland Lewis
- Grady Lewis
- Kira Lewis Jr.
- Martin Lewis
- Maxwell Lewis
- Mike Lewis
- Quincy Lewis
- Ralph Lewis
- Rashard Lewis
- Reggie Lewis
- Scottie Lewis
- Marcus Liberty
- Todd Lichti
- E. J. Liddell
- Sam Lieberman
- DeAndre Liggins
- Bill Ligon
- Jim Ligon
- Karl Lillge
- Damian Lillard
- Jeremy Lin
- Bud Lindberg
- Steve Lingenfelter
- Leroy Lins
- Frank Linskey
- Alton Lister
- Nassir Little
- Sam Little
- Gene Littles
- Dereck Lively II
- Isaiah Livers
- Chris Livingston
- Randy Livingston
- Shaun Livingston
- Ron Livingstone
- Horacio Llamas
- Bill Lloyd
- Bob Lloyd
- Chuck Lloyd
- Earl Lloyd
- Lewis Lloyd
- Scott Lloyd
- Riney Lochmann
- Bob Lochmueller
- Rob Lock
- Darrell Lockhart
- Ian Lockhart
- Kevin Loder
- Don Lofgran
- Kenneth Lofton Jr.
- Zach Lofton
- Henry Logan
- Johnny Logan
- Brad Lohaus
- Art Long
- Grant Long
- John Long
- Paul Long
- Shawn Long
- Willie Long
- Luc Longley
- Slim Lonsdorf
- Kevon Looney
- Brook Lopez
- Felipe Lopez
- Karim López
- Raül López
- Robin Lopez
- Del Loranger
- Joe Lord
- Gene Lorendo
- Ryan Lorthridge
- Jim Loscutoff
- Plummer Lott
- Sam Loucks
- Kevin Loughery
- Didi Louzada
- Bob Love
- Caleb Love
- Kevin Love
- Stan Love
- Clyde Lovellette
- Lawson Lovering
- Sidney Lowe
- Charlie Lowery
- Kyle Lowry
- Bobby Lowther
- Carl Loyd
- Jordan Loyd
- Al Lucas
- Jerry Lucas
- John Lucas
- John Lucas III
- Kalin Lucas
- Maurice Lucas
- Ted Luckenbill
- Tyronn Lue
- James Luisi
- Al Lujack
- Phil Lumpkin
- Ray Lumpp
- Gabriel Lundberg
- Seth Lundy
- Timothé Luwawu-Cabarrot
- Tyler Lydon
- Trey Lyles
- R. B. Lynam
- George Lynch
- Kevin Lynch
- Lonnie Lynn
- Mike Lynn
- Bob Lytle
