= 1939–40 National Basketball League (United States) season =

1939–40 NBL season
- League: National Basketball League
- Sport: Basketball
- Duration: November 22, 1939 – March 6, 1940; March 6–9, 1940 (Playoffs); March 11–16, 1940 (Finals)
- Games: 28
- Teams: 8

Regular season
- Season champions: Akron Firestone Non-Skids
- Top seed: Akron Firestone Non-Skids
- Season MVP: Leroy Edwards (Oshkosh)
- Top scorer: Leroy Edwards (Oshkosh)

Playoffs
- Eastern champions: Akron Firestone Non-Skids
- Eastern runners-up: Detroit Eagles
- Western champions: Oshkosh All-Stars
- Western runners-up: Sheboygan Red Skins

Finals
- Venue: Firestone Clubhouse, Akron, Ohio; South Park School Gymnasium, Oshkosh, Wisconsin
- Champions: Akron Firestone Non-Skids
- Runners-up: Oshkosh All-Stars

NBL seasons
- ← 1938–39 1940–41 →

The 1939–40 NBL season was the fifth National Basketball League (NBL) season. The regular season began on November 22, 1939, and ended on March 6, 1940. It would also be considered the first season in the league's history where the NBL would operate while the Great Depression would technically be considered over and done with. The playoffs began on the same day as the end of the regular season due to the Akron Firestone Non-Skids and Detroit Eagles both uniquely deciding to have their last regular season game against each other also count as a playoff game at the same time and ran until March 16, 1940, with the Akron Firestone Non-Skids once again defeating the Oshkosh All-Stars by 3 games to 2 in a rematch of the previous season's NBL Championship, with this rematch resulting in a reverse sweep by the Firestone Non-Skids after previously being down 0–2 early in the series.

== Teams ==
The Pittsburgh Pirates did not field a team in the 1939–40 season. Instead, they would be replaced by the Chicago Bruins, who had previously competed in the American Basketball League in its first iteration before the long-term effects of the Great Depression forced it to shut down operations on a temporary basis. The Cleveland White Horses also relocated to Detroit, Michigan and were renamed the Detroit Eagles.

Eastern Division	Akron Firestone Non-Skids Akron, Ohio	Akron Goodyear Wingfoots Akron, Ohio
Eastern Division	Detroit Eagles Detroit, Michigan	Indianapolis Kautskys Indianapolis, Indiana
Western Division	Chicago Bruins Chicago, Illinois	Hammond Ciesar All-Americans Hammond, Indiana
Western Division	Oshkosh All-Stars Oshkosh, Wisconsin	Sheboygan Red Skins Sheboygan, Wisconsin

Coaching changes
Offseason
Team	1938–39 coach	1939–40 coach
Akron Goodyear Wingfoots	Lefty Byers	Ray Detrick
Indianapolis Kautskys	Bob Nipper	Ward Meyers
Oshkosh All-Stars	George Hotchkiss	Lon Darling
Sheboygan Red Skins	Edwin Schutte	Frank Zummach
In-season
Team	Outgoing coach	Incoming coach
Hammond Ciesar All-Americans	Lou Boudreau	Eddie Ciesar (interim)
Hammond Ciesar All-Americans	Eddie Ciesar (interim)	Leo Bereolos

== Preseason ==
Prior to the start of the season, the Oshkosh All-Stars sold shares of their team worth $25 each to raise funds following financial losses in the previous season. The NBL would also adopt the ten second backcourt violation in order to help speed up the game more as well as provide teams with more opportunities to score throughout the game.

== Regular season ==
Teams were scheduled to play a 28-game regular season, playing four games (two home, two away) against every other team. The final game of the regular season between the Akron Firestone Non-Skids and the Detroit Eagles also served as the first game in their playoff series.

== Team standings ==
=== Eastern Division ===
Pos.	Eastern Division	Wins	Losses	Win %
1	Akron Firestone Non-Skids	19	9	.679
2	Detroit Eagles	17	11	.607
3	Akron Goodyear Wingfoots	14	14	.500
4	Indianapolis Kautskys	9	19	.321

=== Western Division ===
Pos.	Western Division	Wins	Losses	Win %
T–1	Oshkosh All-Stars	15	13	.536
T–1	Sheboygan Red Skins	15	13	.536
3	Chicago Bruins	14	14	.500
4	Hammond Ciesar All-Americans	9	19	.321

== Postseason ==
=== Playoffs ===
The top two teams from each division qualified for the playoffs. The Akron Firestone Non-Skids returned to the NBL Championship after sweeping the Detroit Eagles 2–0 in the Eastern Division playoff. The Oshkosh All-Stars also returned to the championship after defeating the Sheboygan Red Skins 2–1 in the Western Division playoff. In the rematch of last season's championship, Akron successfully defended its title, defeating the All-Stars by 3 games to 2. The result meant that Oshkosh had now finished second for three consecutive seasons.

Division Playoffs
E1	Akron Firestone Non-Skids	2
E2	Detroit Eagles	0
W1	Oshkosh All-Stars	2
W2	Sheboygan Red Skins	1

NBL Championship
E1	Akron Firestone Non-Skids	3
W1	Oshkosh All-Stars	2

- Bold Series winner

=== World Professional Basketball Tournament ===
After the conclusion of the NBL season, three NBL teams, the Chicago Bruins, the Oshkosh All-Stars, and the Sheboygan Red Skins, competed in the 1940 edition of the World Professional Basketball Tournament. The Red Skins lost to the eventual third-placed Syracuse Reds in the quarterfinals, while the Bruins finished as runners-up to the Harlem Globetrotters after defeating the All-Stars in the quarterfinals.

== Statistics ==
=== Leaders ===
Category	Player	Team	Stat
Points	Leroy Edwards	Oshkosh All-Stars	361
Free-Throws	Leroy Edwards	Oshkosh All-Stars	139
Field goals	Ernie Andres	Indianapolis Kautskys	130

Note: Prior to the 1969–70 NBA season, league leaders in points were determined by totals rather than averages. Also, rebounding and assist numbers were not recorded properly in the NBL like they would be in the BAA/NBA, as would field goal and free-throw shooting percentages.

== Awards ==
- NBL Most Valuable Player: Leroy Edwards, Oshkosh All-Stars
- NBL Coach of the Year: Paul Sheeks, Akron Firestone Non-Skids
- NBL Rookie of the Year: Ben Stephens, Akron Goodyear Wingfoots
- All-NBL First Team:
  - G/F – Soup Cable, Akron Firestone Non-Skids
  - G/F – Charley Shipp, Oshkosh All-Stars
  - C/F – Leroy Edwards, Oshkosh All-Stars
  - G/F – Ben Stephens, Akron Goodyear Wingfoots
  - G/F – Wibs Kautz, Chicago Bruins
- All-NBL Second Team:
  - G/F – Ernie Andres, Indianapolis Kautskys
  - G/F – Otto Kolar, Sheboygan Red Skins
  - G/F – Rube Lautenschlager, Sheboygan Red Skins
  - G/F – Jack Ozburn, Akron Firestone Non-Skids
  - G/F – Nat Frankel, Detroit Eagles

== See also ==
- National Basketball League (United States)
