= Stanky =

Stanky is a surname. Notable people with the surname include:

- Eddie Stanky (1915–1999), American baseball player
- Walt Stanky (1911–1978), American basketball player

== See also ==
- John Stankey (born 1962), American businessman
