= Art Hyatt =

American basketball player (1912–1991)

Personal information
- Born: June 29, 1912
- Died: January 3, 1991 (aged 78) University Place, Washington
- Listed height: 6 ft 2 in (1.88 m)
- Listed weight: 190 lb (86 kg)

Career information
- High school: Schenley (Pittsburgh, Pennsylvania)
- Position: Guard

Career history
- 1932–1934: Tulsa Diamond Oilers
- 1934–1935: Bradford Big Five
- 1934–1935: Hollywood Universal Pictures
- 1936–1937: Pittsburgh Y.M.H.A.
- 1938–1939: Hyatt Big Five
- 1938–1939: Warren Penns / Cleveland White Horses
- 1938–1939: Elmira Colonels
- 1939–1940: Detroit Eagles

Career highlights
- NYPBL champion (1939)

Arthur G. Hyatt (June 29, 1912 – January 3, 1991) was an American professional basketball player. Hyatt played in the National Basketball League from 1938 to 1940, competing first for the Cleveland White Horses and then for the Detroit Eagles. He was the brother of Charley Hyatt, a well-known collegiate basketball player in the 1920s.
