= Fickle, Indiana =

Fickle
- Unincorporated community
- Location within Clinton County, Indiana
- Coordinates: 40°15′40″N 86°40′30″W
- Country: United States
- State: Indiana
- County: Clinton
- Township: Washington
- Elevation: 833 ft (254 m)
- ZIP code: 46041
- FIPS code: 18-23134
- GNIS feature ID: 446766

Fickle is an unincorporated community in Washington Township, Clinton County, Indiana.

== History ==
The town of Fickle is named for Isaac Fickle, one of the early settlers of Washington Township. It was established as a station along the Toledo, St. Louis and Western Railroad, better known the "Clover Leaf" Railroad; the town's Clover Leaf Church is named for it.

The post office was established at Fickle in 1888, and remained in operation until it was discontinued in 1928.
