= Oshkosh North High School =

Public high school in Oshkosh, Wisconsin

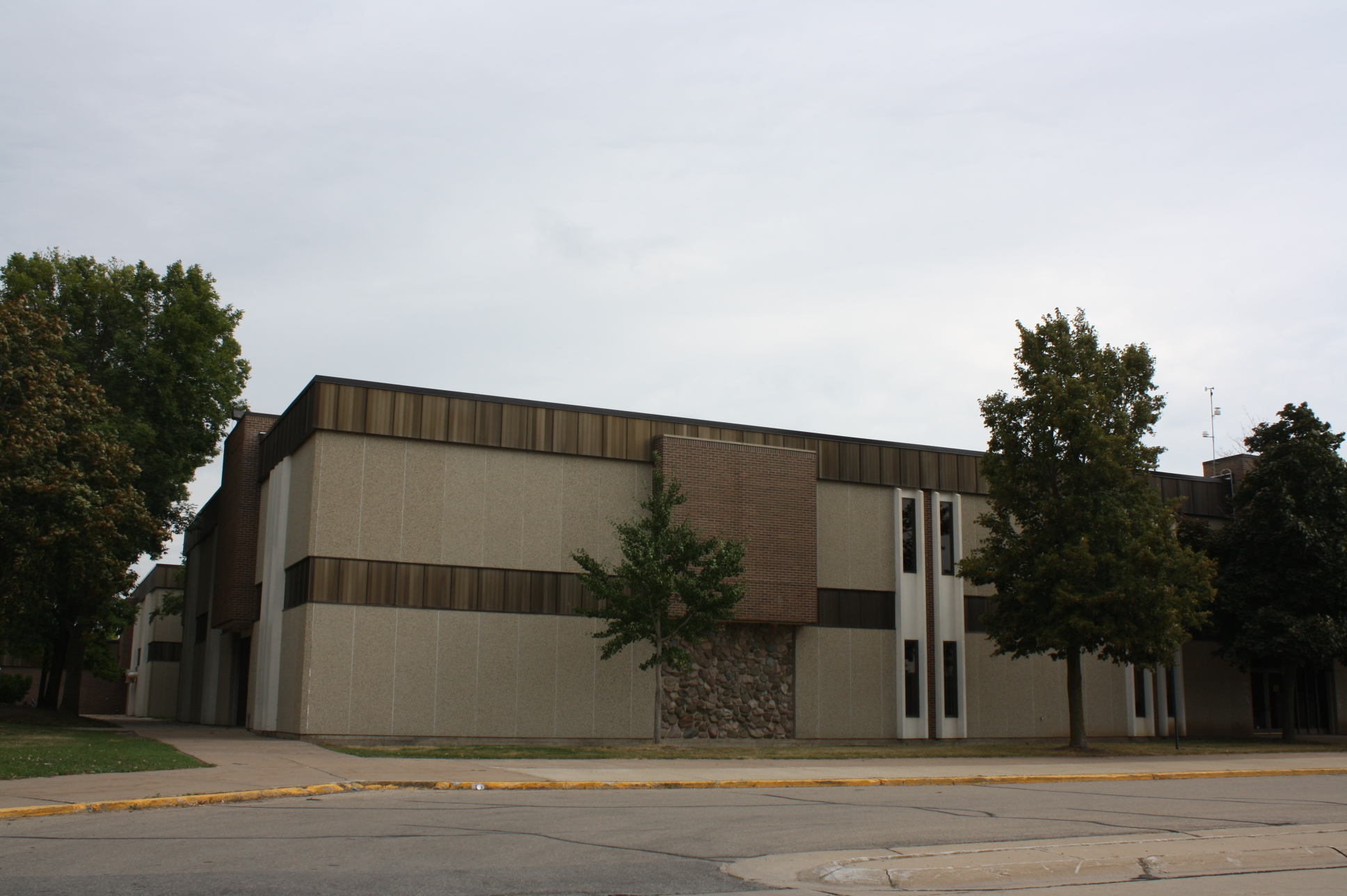
- Oshkosh North High School

Location
- 1100 West Smith Avenue; Oshkosh, Wisconsin; United States; 44°02′45.8″N 88°32′58.5″W

Information
- Type: Public secondary
- Established: 1972
- Oversight: Oshkosh Area School District
- NCES School ID: 551119001495
- Dean: Leeann Gauthier, Robin Speidel
- Principal: Mitchelle Last
- Staff: 103.75 (FTE)
- Grades: 9–12
- Enrollment: 1,262 (2023–2024)
- Student to teacher ratio: 12.16
- Colors: Green and gold
- Mascot: Spartan
- Newspaper: North Star
- Yearbook: Reflections
- Feeder schools: Vel Philips Middle School
- Website: oshkosh-north-high.oshkosh.k12.wi.us

Oshkosh North High School is a public secondary/high school located in Oshkosh, Wisconsin. Part of the Oshkosh Area School District, the school serves students in grades 9 through 12. As of 2021, there are 1,193 students enrolled at the school. It is referred to by students as "North". The facility holds an in-house TV studio, swimming pool, field house with Weight Room, and an auditorium.

The school was built in 1972 as a second high school for the city, when the Oshkosh West High School, formerly known as Oshkosh High School, facilities became too small to support the growing number for students. The school first opened as an open-concept school, with modular walls between classrooms, and multiple classes taking place in one room at the same time. After the 70s, the school began to shift toward a traditional layout, adding in permanent walls and separating many of the large classrooms.

== Extracurricular activities ==
Oshkosh North offers 15 unique sports. Sports offered include baseball, basketball, cross country, dance team, football, golf, gymnastics, hockey, soccer, softball, swimming and diving, tennis, track, volleyball, and wrestling, all of which participate in the Fox Valley Association. In 2000, the football team was the Division 1 state champion for the state of Wisconsin. In 2013, the Oshkosh North football team was runner-up for Division 2 champions. In 2018, the Oshkosh North basketball team were the Division 1 State Champion for the state of Wisconsin.

The school has 35 student clubs and organizations as of the 2021–2022 school year.

== Notable alumni ==
- Kenneth La'ron Beasley (2014), singer, songwriter, and rapper known as KennyHoopla
- Tyrese Haliburton (2018), professional basketball player for the Indiana Pacers
- Gordon Hintz (1992), county executive of Winnebago County, Wisconsin
- Jamie Pollard (1983), Iowa State University Athletic Director

== Alternative education programs ==
Oshkosh North High School offers a number of alternative education programs to their students.

=== Communities ===
Communities is an alternative education program offered via application to all students at North. The program replaces some classes with specialized ones made to provide an education that emphasizes working within a community, both within the classroom and in the city as a whole, including leadership classes, as well as alternative social studies, and English class. Collaboration, Creativity, Critical Thinking, Communication, and Commitment are the major traits that the Communities program seeks to create in its students.

=== eAcademy ===
eAcademy is a fully online schooling option available to all K-12 students in the Oshkosh Area School District. It is also available to students who are not fully online, as individual classes they can take for courses either not offered in person, or as an alternative option that provides a more self-guided option.
