= Bill Lane (basketball) =

American basketball player

Personal information
- Born: November 2, 1916 Detroit, Michigan, U.S.
- Died: June 21, 1997 (aged 80) Port Huron, Michigan, U.S.
- Listed height: 6 ft 4 in (1.93 m)
- Listed weight: 220 lb (100 kg)

Career information
- High school: Eastern (Detroit, Michigan)
- College: Michigan (1936–1938)
- Position: Forward / center

Career history
- 1938–1939: Cooper Collegians
- 1939–1940: East Side Sports
- 1940: Detroit Eagles

William Bradfield Lane (November 2, 1916 – June 21, 1997) was an American professional basketball player. He played for the Detroit Eagles in the National Basketball League for three games during their 1940–41 season. After basketball he worked for a long time at Ford Motor Company.
