= Lou Jagnow =

American basketball player

Personal information
- Born: July 31, 1910 Jackson, Michigan
- Died: March 26, 2007 (aged 96) Grand Rapids, Michigan
- Listed height: 6 ft 1 in (1.85 m)
- Listed weight: 180 lb (82 kg)

Career information
- High school: Jackson (Jackson, Michigan)
- College: Carnegie Mellon (1932–1934, 1935–1936)
- Position: Guard

Career history
- 1939–1940: East Side Sports
- 1939: Detroit Eagles

Career highlights
- Mr. Basketball of Michigan (1929)

Louis Eugene Jagnow (July 31, 1910 – March 26, 2007) was an American professional basketball player. He played in the National Basketball League for the Detroit Eagles in two games during the 1939–40 season.
