= Dan Weisse =

American college basketball coach

Current position
- Title: Head coach
- Team: Oshkosh West HS
- Conference: Fox Valley Association
- Record: 29–69

Biographical details
- Education: University of Wisconsin-Milwaukee

Playing career
- –2003: Milwaukee

Coaching career (HC unless noted)
- 2004–05: Wisconsin–La Crosse (GA)
- 2005–07: Middle Tennessee State (GA)
- 2007–11: North Dakota State (assistant)
- 2011–14: MSU Moorhead (assistant)
- 2014–22: Minnesota Crookston
- 2022–present: Oshkosh West HS

Head coaching record
- Overall: 66–151 (college); 29–69 (high school)

Dan Weisse is an American college basketball coach, formerly the head coach for the Minnesota Crookston Golden Eagles.

Weisse is a native of Oshkosh, Wisconsin. He graduated from Oshkosh West High School and then went on to play collegiate basketball for the Milwaukee Panthers and graduated with a degree in secondary education. After his playing days were over, he became a graduate assistant at the University of Wisconsin–La Crosse for the 2004–05 season. For the following two seasons he became a graduate assistant at Middle Tennessee State University. Weisse was then hired as an assistant coach at North Dakota State University under head coach Saul Phillips. He served there for four seasons before being hired as an assistant coach at Minnesota State University–Moorhead where he served for three seasons. In 2014 he was hired as the head coach at the University of Minnesota Crookston. In 2022 it was announced that Minnesota Crookston would not renew Weisse's contract. In his seven seasons, Weisse accumulated an overall record of 66–151. In 2022, Weisse was hired as the head coach at Oshkosh West High School.

Weisse has a wife named Andrea and three children named Makenna, Ethan, and Addison.

== Head coaching record ==
=== College ===
Record table
Season	Team	Overall	Conference	Standing	Postseason
Minnesota Crookston (NSIC) (2014–present)
2014–15	Minnesota Crookston	7–20	5–17	T-14th	
2015–16	Minnesota Crookston	3–24	1–21	16th	
2016–17	Minnesota Crookston	8–21	4–18	T-14th	
2017–18	Minnesota Crookston	10–19	7–15	T-12th	
2018–19	Minnesota Crookston	17–16	9–13	T-10th	
2019–20	Minnesota Crookston	11–18	7–15	T-11th	
2020–21	Minnesota Crookston	2–14	1–13	15th	
2021–22	Minnesota Crookston	8–19	5–16	T-14th	
Minnesota Crookston:		66–151 (.304)	39–128 (.234)		
Total:		66–151 (.304)			
National champion Postseason invitational champion Conference regular season champion Conference regular season and conference tournament champion Division regular season champion Division regular season and conference tournament champion Conference tournament champion

=== High school ===
Record table
Season	Team	Overall	Conference	Standing	Postseason
Oshkosh West HS (Fox Valley) (2022–present)
2022–23	Oshkosh West HS	8–20	3–16	10th	
2023–24	Oshkosh West HS	6–19	3–15	9th	
2024–25	Oshkosh West HS	7–16	3–14	9th	
2025–26	Oshkosh West HS	8–14	6–10		
Oshkosh West HS:		29–69 (.296)	15–55 (.214)		
Total:		29–69 (.296)			
National champion Postseason invitational champion Conference regular season champion Conference regular season and conference tournament champion Division regular season champion Division regular season and conference tournament champion Conference tournament champion

== Career stats ==
Legend
GP	Games played	GS	Games started	MPG	Minutes per game
FG%	Field goal percentage	3P%	3-point field goal percentage	FT%	Free throw percentage
RPG	Rebounds per game	APG	Assists per game	SPG	Steals per game
BPG	Blocks per game	PPG	Points per game	**Bold**	Career high

== College ==
Year	Team	GP	GS	MPG	FG%	3P%	FT%	RPG	APG	SPG	BPG	PPG
2001–02	Milwaukee	29	11	21.0	.31	.28	.65	1.9	2.7	1.0	0.0	4.2
2002–03	Milwaukee	32	4	13.5	.43	.40	.81	1.3	1.0	0.7	0.1	3.3
