= Buck Batterman =

American basketball player (1918–1999)

Bob Bolyard
Personal information
- Born: April 1, 1918 Oshkosh, Wisconsin, U.S.
- Died: January 5, 1999 (aged 80) Wautoma, Wisconsin, U.S.
- Listed height: 6 ft 3 in (1.91 m)
- Listed weight: 195 lb (88 kg)

Career information
- High school: Oshkosh (Oshkosh, Wisconsin)
- College: Wisconsin–Oshkosh (1937–1938)
- Position: Forward

Career history
- 1938–1939: Oshkosh Chris-Crafts
- 1939–1941: Oshkosh All-Stars
- 1940–1941: Clintonville Truckers

Virgil Hugo "Buck" Batterman (April 1, 1918 – January 5, 1999) was an American professional basketball player. He played for the Oshkosh All-Stars in the National Basketball League and averaged 1.2 points per game.
