= Jake Nagode =

American basketball player

Personal information
- Born: July 11, 1915 Illinois
- Died: January 31, 1976 (aged 60)
- Listed height: 6 ft 2 in (1.88 m)
- Listed weight: 170 lb (77 kg)

Career information
- High school: Waukegan (Waukegan, Illinois)
- College: Northwestern (1935–1938)
- Position: Small forward / shooting guard

Career history
- 1939–1941: Akron Goodyear Wingfoots

Jacob W. Nagode (July 11, 1915 – January 31, 1976) was an American professional basketball player who played two years in the National Basketball League (NBL) for the Akron Goodyear Wingfoots during the 1939–40 and 1940–41 seasons.
