= Jim Montgomery (basketball) =

American basketball player

Personal information
- Born: April 13, 1915 Johnstown, Pennsylvania, U.S.
- Died: June 13, 1982 (aged 67) Mesa, Arizona, U.S.
- Listed height: 6 ft 3 in (1.91 m)
- Listed weight: 190 lb (86 kg)

Career information
- College: Villanova (1936–1939)
- Playing career: 1939–1946
- Position: Center / power forward

Career history
- 1939: Akron Goodyear
- 1939–1941: Akron Goodyear Wingfoots
- 1942–1943: Akron Collegians
- 1942–1943: Akron Goodyear Wingfoots
- 1944–1945: Rochester Guards
- 1945–1946: Akron Goodyear Wingfoots

James Cameron Montgomery (April 13, 1915 – June 13, 1982) was an American professional basketball player. He played in the National Basketball League for the Akron Goodyear Wingfoots and averaged 3.3 points per game. He eventually became a vice president at Reynolds and Reynolds.
