= Howard Vocke =

American basketball player

Personal information
- Born: March 16, 1915 New York City, New York, U.S.
- Died: September 8, 1998 (aged 83) Akron, Ohio, U.S.
- Listed height: 6 ft 0 in (1.83 m)
- Listed weight: 190 lb (86 kg)

Career information
- High school: Hempstead (Hempstead, New York)
- College: St. John's (1936–1939)
- Position: Guard

Career history
- 1939–1942, 1946–1948: Akron Goodyear Wingfoots

George Howard Vocke (March 16, 1915 – September 8, 1998) was an American professional basketball player, active from 1939 to 1948. He played for the Akron Goodyear Wingfoots in the National Basketball League and averaged 4.5 points per game.
