= Ray Adams (basketball) =

American basketball player (1912–1992)

Personal information
- Born: September 28, 1912 Chicago, Illinois, U.S.
- Died: August 26, 1992 (aged 79) Des Plaines, Illinois, U.S.
- Listed height: 6 ft 2 in (1.88 m)
- Listed weight: 185 lb (84 kg)

Career information
- High school: St. Patrick (Chicago, Illinois)
- College: DePaul (1933–1936)
- Playing career: 1936–1941
- Position: Power forward / center

Career history
- 1936–1938: Chicago Duffy Floral
- 1936–1940: Oshkosh All-Stars
- 1940–1941: Chicago Bruins

Raymond Thomas Adams (September 28, 1912 – August 26, 1992) was an American professional basketball player. He played for the Oshkosh All-Stars and Chicago Bruins in the National Basketball League and averaged 4.1 points per game.

Adams served as a lieutenant in the United States Army during World War II and was head coach of the 1944 Camp Ellis Cardinals football team. He also coached high school basketball and became a tax and financial consultant.

== Career statistics ==
Legend
GP	Games played	FGM	Field goals made
FTM	Free throws made	FTA	Free throws attempted
FT%	Free throw percentage	PTS	Total points
PPG	Points per game	**Bold**	Career high

=== NBL ===
==== Regular season ====
Year	Team	GP	FGM	FTM	FTA	FT%	PTS	PPG
1937–38	Oshkosh	12	26	10			62	**5.2**
1938–39	Oshkosh	**24**	**42**	**26**			**110**	4.6
1939–40	Oshkosh	1	1	1			3	3.0
1940–41	Chicago	20	23	14	23	.609	60	3.0
Career		57	92	51	23	.609	235	4.1

==== Playoffs ====
Year	Team	GP	FGM	FTM	PTS	PPG
1938	Oshkosh	**5**	**5**	**7**	**17**	**3.4**
1939	Oshkosh	**5**	3	3	9	1.8
Career		10	8	10	26	2.6
