= Bill Holland (basketball) =

American basketball player

Personal information
- Born: April 10, 1914 Greenville, Pennsylvania
- Died: February 26, 2000 (aged 85) Plymouth, Massachusetts
- Listed height: 6 ft 5 in (1.96 m)
- Listed weight: 210 lb (95 kg)

Career information
- College: Edinboro (1932–1935)
- Position: Center / forward

Career history
- 1935–1936: Warren Penns
- 1936–1937: Warren HyVis Oils
- 1937–1939: Warren Penns
- 1938–1939: Elmira Colonels
- 1939: Cleveland White Horses
- 1939–1941: Detroit Eagles

Career highlights
- WPBT champion (1941); NYPBL champion (1939)

William James Holland (April 10, 1914 – February 26, 2000) was an American professional basketball player. He played in the National Basketball League for the Warren Penns, Cleveland White Horses, and Detroit Eagles and averaged 5.2 points per game.
