= Ward Meyers =

American basketball player and coach (1908–1987)

Personal information
- Born: April 19, 1908 Huntington County, Indiana, U.S.
- Died: April 6, 1987 (aged 78)
- Listed height: 6 ft 1 in (1.85 m)
- Listed weight: 185 lb (84 kg)
- Position: Center

Career history

Playing
- 1929–1931: Fort Wayne Hoosiers
- 1931–1932: Toledo Red Man Tobaccos
- 1932–1933: Fort Wayne Chiefs
- 1933–1935: Fort Wayne General Electrics
- 1935–1936: Kingston Colonials
- 1936–1937: Akron Firestone Non-Skids
- 1939–1940: Indianapolis Kautskys

Coaching
- 1939–1940: Indianapolis Kautskys

Columbus Wardner "Ward" Meyers (April 19, 1908 – April 6, 1987) was an American professional basketball player and coach. He played in the National Basketball League for the Indianapolis Kautskys during the 1939–40 season and averaged 2.0 points per game in two games played. That season he also served as the head coach. Meyers spent the majority of his playing career in the Fort Wayne, Indiana region, competing on semi-professional teams.

== Head coaching record ==
Legend
Regular season	G	Games coached	W	Games won	L	Games lost	W–L %	Win–loss %
Playoffs	PG	Playoff games	PW	Playoff wins	PL	Playoff losses	PW–L %	Playoff win–loss %

Team	Year	G	W	L	W–L%	Finish	PG	PW	PL	PW–L%	Result
Indianapolis	1939–40	28	9	19	.321	4th in Eastern	–	–	–	–	Missed playoffs
Total		28	9	19	.321		–	–	–	–	
