= Oscar Olson (basketball) =

American basketball player and coach

Personal information
- Born: November 2, 1917 Max, North Dakota, U.S.
- Died: August 31, 1997 (aged 79) Cambridge, Massachusetts, U.S.
- Listed height: 6 ft 0 in (1.83 m)
- Listed weight: 165 lb (75 kg)

Career information
- High school: Braham (Braham, Minnesota)
- College: Carleton (1936–1939)
- Position: Forward

Career history
- 1939: Oshkosh All-Stars

Career highlights
- Third-team All-American – Converse (1939); 3× All-Midwest Conference (1937–1939)

Oscar Alfred "Sonny" Olson Jr. (November 2, 1917 – August 31, 1997) was an American professional basketball player. He played for the Oshkosh All-Stars for two games in the National Basketball League during the 1939–40 season and averaged 2.0 points per game.
