= Buzz Knoblauch =

American basketball player (1912–1984)

Personal information
- Born: April 22, 1912 Martel, Nebraska, U.S.
- Died: March 7, 1984 (aged 71) Cambridge, Wisconsin, U.S.
- Listed height: 6 ft 1 in (1.85 m)
- Listed weight: 163 lb (74 kg)

Career information
- High school: Tomah (Tomah, Wisconsin)
- College: Carroll (1933–1936)
- Position: Forward
- Number: 25

Career history

Playing
- 1939: Oshkosh All-Stars
- 1940–1941: Milwaukee Omars
- 1943–1946: Milwaukee Allen-Bradleys

Coaching
- 194?–195?: Cambridge HS

James Bernard "Buzz" Knoblauch (April 22, 1912 – March 7, 1984) was an American professional basketball player. He played in the United States' National Basketball League (NBL) for the Oshkosh All-Stars in three games during the 1939–40 season. He scored two career points in the NBL.

Prior to the NBL, Knoblauch played for Carroll University and is regarded as one of the program's best ever players. He also played for the school's football team.
