= Tex Mueller =

American basketball player (1916-2012)

Personal information
- Born: July 29, 1916 Yorktown, Texas, U.S.
- Died: May 22, 2012 (aged 95) Slaton, Texas, U.S.
- Listed height: 6 ft 1 in (1.85 m)
- Listed weight: 175 lb (79 kg)

Career information
- High school: Wilson (Wilson, Texas)
- College: Western Colorado (1936–1938)
- Position: Guard

Career history
- 1939–1941, 1942–1943: Oshkosh All-Stars

Career highlights
- NBL champion (1941)

LeRoy Jacob "Tex" Mueller (July 29, 1916 – May 22, 2012) was an American professional basketball player. He played for the Oshkosh All-Stars of the National Basketball League for three seasons and averaged 1.0 point per game. He won the NBL championship in 1940–41.

After his basketball career, Mueller moved back to his home state of Texas and spent his career in the oil industry until retiring in 1981.
