= Oshkosh West High School =

Public high school in Oshkosh, Wisconsin

Location
- 375 North Eagle Street; Oshkosh, Wisconsin 54902; United States; 44°1′22″N 88°34′22″W

Information
- Type: Public secondary
- Established: 1969
- School district: Oshkosh Area School District
- NCES School ID: 551119001496
- Principal: Rebecca Montour
- Teaching staff: 117.83 (FTE)
- Grades: 9-12
- Enrollment: 1,623 (2024-2025)
- Student to teacher ratio: 13.77
- Colors: Royal Blue and White
- Mascot: Wildcat
- Rival: Oshkosh North High School
- Newspaper: Index
- Feeder schools: Carl Traeger Middle School, South Park Middle School, Perry Tipler Middle School
- Website: oshkosh-west-high.oshkosh.k12.wi.us

Oshkosh West High School is a public high school in Oshkosh, Wisconsin, and part of the Oshkosh Area School District. As of 2019, the school has 1,691 students in grades 9 through 12. Originally known as Oshkosh High School when the building was opened in 1961, its name was changed when Oshkosh North High School was built in 1972. The facility holds a swimming pool and three gyms, as well as the Alberta Kimball Auditorium.

== Extracurricular activities ==
As of the 2018–2019 school year, Oshkosh West has 53 student clubs and 23 sports, 11 for males and 12 for females, all participating in the Fox Valley Association. The Oshkosh West Boys Basketball team won the state Division 1 championship in 2006 and 2007, and was undefeated in the 2005-06 season. The Oshkosh West Girls Basketball team was the state champion for Division 1 in 2003 and 2004.

== Miscellaneous ==
- The school mascot is the Wildcat, as depicted in the school logo, in which a feline paw slashes through the capital letter "W". The school song is "On Wisconsin".
- Prior to 2001, the school mascot was the Indian. However, because of controversy about Native American mascots, OWHS changed its mascot to the Wildcat, which was selected in a student vote.

Every November the band goes to the Oshkosh holiday parade

== Notable alumni ==
- Dylan Postl, WWE Superstar
- Stevie Rachelle, rock singer
- Dan Weisse, college basketball coach
