= Bill Laughlin =

American basketball player

Personal information
- Born: December 10, 1915 Hookstown, Pennsylvania
- Died: November 22, 1993 (aged 77) Washington, Pennsylvania
- Listed height: 6 ft 2 in (1.88 m)
- Listed weight: 185 lb (84 kg)

Career information
- High school: East Liverpool (East Liverpool, Ohio)
- College: Washington & Jefferson (1935–1938)
- Position: Forward

Career history

Playing
- 1938: Elmira Colonels
- 1938–1939: Warren Penns / Cleveland White Horses
- 1939–1941: East Liverpool Fleetwing

Coaching
- 1939–1943: East Liverpool HS
- 1946–1962: Washington HS

William Merle Laughlin (December 10, 1915 – November 22, 1993) was an American professional basketball player. He played for the Elmira Colonels in the New York State Professional Basketball League, as well as the Cleveland White Horses in the National Basketball League. In the NBL, he averaged 8.6 points per game.

After his playing career, Laughlin served in the Navy during World War II, then became a high school teacher and basketball coach.
