= Karl Lillge =

American basketball player (1917–1994)

Personal information
- Born: July 17, 1917 Appleton, Wisconsin, U.S.
- Died: April 17, 1994 (aged 76) San Jose, California, U.S.
- Listed height: 6 ft 0 in (1.83 m)
- Listed weight: 170 lb (77 kg)

Career information
- High school: Appleton West (Appleton, Wisconsin)
- Playing career: 1935–1939
- Position: Guard / forward

Career history
- 1935–1936: Little Chute Cardinals
- 1935–1936: Appleton Ponds Sports
- 1936–1937: Fox River Paper Co.
- 1936–1937: Kaukauna Fargo Furniture
- 1938–1940: Appleton Elm Tree Bakers
- 1939: Oshkosh All-Stars

Karl Walter Lillge (July 17, 1917 – April 17, 1994) was an American professional basketball player. He played for the Oshkosh All-Stars in the National Basketball League for three games during their 1939–40 season and averaged 0.7 points per game. Lillge also played in a number of independent leagues and in the Amateur Athletic Union.
