= Oshkosh Area School District =

Public school district for Oshkosh, Wisconsin

Address
- 215 S Eagle St Oshkosh, Wisconsin 54902; United States

District information
- Type: Public School District
- Motto: Building Community Through Education
- Grades: K4–12
- President: Bob Poeschl
- Vice-president: Barbara Herzog
- Superintendent: Bryan Davis
- Deputy superintendent(s): David Gundlach
- Schools: 18; Elementary: 11; Middle: 4 High: 2 Early Learning: 1
- Budget: $166 million (2021–22)
- NCES District ID: 5511190

Students and staff
- Students: 9,101 (2024-25)
- Teachers: 738.72 (on an FTE basis)
- Staff: 1,299.94
- Student–teacher ratio: 12.32
- Athletic conference: Fox Valley Association
- Colors

Other information
- Website: www.oshkosh.k12.wi.us

Oshkosh Area School District is a school district located in Oshkosh, Wisconsin. It has about 10,000 students and operates 11 elementary schools, four middle schools, two high schools, and three charter schools. The district is governed by a seven-person Board of Education which is elected at large for three-year terms, as well as a superintendent of schools. The current board president is Bob Poeschl, and the current superintendent is Dr. Bryan Davis.

== Schools ==
=== High schools ===
- Oshkosh North High School (9–12)
- Oshkosh West High School (9–12)

=== Middle schools ===
- Carl Traeger Middle School (6–8)
- Vel Phillips Middle School (opened in 2023, replacing Webster Stanley and Merrill Middle Schools) (6–8)
- Perry Tipler Middle School (4–8)
- South Park Middle School (6–8)

=== Elementary schools ===
- Carl Traeger Elementary School (PK–5)
- Emmeline Cook Elementary School (KG–5)
- Franklin Elementary School (KG–5)
- Jefferson Elementary School (KG–5)
- Lakeside Elementary School (KG–5)
- Menominee Elementary School (KG–5)
- Oaklawn Elementary School (KG–5)
- Oakwood Elementary (PK–5)
- Read Elementary School (KG–5)
- Roosevelt Elementary School (KG–5)
- Shapiro STEM Academy (PK–5)

=== Early Education Center ===
- Ready 4 Learning School (PK)

== Former schools ==
Oshkosh East High School was an alternative high school in Oshkosh. Established in 2004, it was located in a leased building on Washington Avenue that also housed the Journeys Charter School. The school had about 80 enrolled students; together with its related New Start program, it served about 100 students. The school was the subject of some controversy because of its low graduation rate. The school had about ten staff members. It was closed in June 2010 amid public concern over increased class sizes at North and West high schools and proposals to consolidate middle and elementary schools in the district due to financial troubles.
