= Gerry Archibald =

Canadian basketball player (1907–1990)

Personal information
- Born: August 22, 1907 Charlottetown, Prince Edward Island, Canada
- Died: November 25, 1990 (aged 83) Warren, Pennsylvania, U.S.
- Listed height: 6 ft 0 in (1.83 m)
- Listed weight: 170 lb (77 kg)

Career information
- Playing career: 1926–1953
- Position: Guard

Career history

Playing
- 1926–1927: Warren Clothes Shop
- 1927–1928: Warren Crescents
- 1928–1929: Corry Keystones
- 1928–1931: Warren Merchants
- 1931–1933: Warren Transits
- 1933–1937: Warren HyVis Oilers
- 1937–1939: Warren Penns
- 1938–1939: Elmira Colonels
- 1939: Cleveland White Horses
- 1952–1953: National Transits

Coaching
- 1936–1939: Warren Penns
- 1938–1939: Elmira Colonels
- 1939: Cleveland White Horses
- 1939–1940: Detroit Eagles

Career highlights
- As player: NYPBL champion (1939)

Gerald Bruce Archibald (August 22, 1907 – November 25, 1990) was a Canadian professional basketball player and coach. He played for several semi-professional and independent league teams before joining the National Basketball League (NBL). In the NBL, Archibald played for the Warren Penns and Cleveland White Horses, where he averaged 0.6 points per game. During the 1937–38 and 1938–39 seasons, he doubled as a player-coach for those teams, respectively. He also served as the Detroit Eagles' head coach in 1939–40.

Born in Charlottetown, Prince Edward Island, Archibald was the son of Lyman Archibald, a member of James Naismith's first basketball team in Springfield, Massachusetts, in 1891.
