= Jefferson, Indiana =

Jefferson
- Unincorporated community and Census-designated place
- Location within Clinton County, Indiana
- Coordinates: 40°16′45″N 86°35′28″W
- Country: United States
- State: Indiana
- County: Clinton
- Township: Washington
- Named for: Thomas Jefferson
- Elevation: 860 ft (260 m)
- ZIP code: 46041
- FIPS code: 18-37908
- GNIS feature ID: 2830344

Jefferson is an unincorporated community in Washington Township, Clinton County, Indiana. The town is named for U.S. President Thomas Jefferson.

== History ==
Jefferson was one of the earliest settlements in Clinton County, being laid out and platted before 1829 and situated in the most thickly settled part of the county at that point. It early on had a post office, which handled mail bi-weekly, and a store operated by Abner Baker and Aaron Southard which sold supplies both to the early pioneers and to the Indians.

When Clinton County organized in 1830, local landowners led by Abner Baker lobbied for Jefferson to be chosen as the county seat, but its non-central location worked against it. John Pence offered 60 acres (240,000 m^{2}) of land and $100 for the establishment of the seat at Frankfort, and the commissioners appointed to select the site accepted.

A post office was established at Jefferson in 1830, and remained in operation until it was discontinued in 1905.

Jefferson was the 1958 birthplace of the now defunct neofascist National States' Rights Party.

== Demographics ==
The United States Census Bureau delineated Jefferson as a census designated place in the 2022 American Community Survey.
