= Garland Lewis =

American basketball player

Personal information
- Born: April 27, 1912 Brownstown, Indiana, U.S.
- Died: December 6, 2009 (aged 97) Laguna Hills, California, U.S.
- Listed height: 6 ft 3 in (1.91 m)

Career information
- High school: Jeffersonville (Jeffersonville, Indiana)
- College: Kentucky (1933–1936)
- Position: Forward

Career history

Playing
- 1939: Indianapolis Kautskys

Coaching
- 1952–1973: San Marino HS

Charles Garland Lewis (April 27, 1912 – December 6, 2009) was an American professional basketball player. He played for the Indianapolis Kautskys in the National Basketball League in one game during the 1939–40 season. He would later work as an athletic director and head boys' basketball coach for San Marino High School in San Marino, California.
