= Walt Stanky =

American basketball player

Personal information
- Born: February 24, 1911 Erie, Pennsylvania, U.S.
- Died: March 1978 (aged 67) Erie, Pennsylvania, U.S.
- Listed height: 6 ft 3 in (1.91 m)
- Listed weight: 200 lb (91 kg)

Career information
- Playing career: 1932–1949
- Position: Power forward / center

Career history
- 1932–1933: Ritz Pennsylvanians
- 1932–1933: Union City
- 1933–1934: Warren HyVis Oils
- 1934–1935: Erie General Electrics
- 1935–1936: Warren HyVis Oils
- 1935–1936: Buffalo Bisons
- 1936–1938: Warren Penns
- 1938–1939: Elmira Colonels
- 1938–1939: Warren Penns/Cleveland White Horses
- 1939–1940: Detroit Eagles
- 1940: Oshkosh All-Stars
- 1940–1941: Erie Forge and Steel
- 1945–1946: Erie Moose
- 1946–1948: Corry Vets
- 1948–1949: Warren Bulldogs
- 1948–1949: Erie Moose

Career highlights
- NYPBL champion (1939)

Walter Joseph Stanky, born Walter Joseph Stankiewicz Jr. (February 24, 1911 – March 1978), was an American professional basketball player. He played in a number of amateur, semi-professional, and professional basketball leagues during the 1930s and 1940s. In the National Basketball League, Stanky played for the Warren Penns, Cleveland White Horses, Detroit Eagles, and Oshkosh All-Stars and averaged 5.7 points per game for his career.
