= Detroit Eagles =

Sports team

The Detroit Eagles were a professional basketball team based in Detroit, Michigan. Before becoming the Detroit Eagles, they originally played under multiple team names (mostly within Warren, Pennsylvania outside of one season within Corry, Pennsylvania) under the ownership of fellow basketball player Gerry Archibald, including the original Warren Buckeyes team in the Central Basketball League back in 1926 and the Warren HyVis Oils (or Warren HyVis Oilers) in the Midwest Basketball Conference before it became the National Basketball League, with them also becoming the Warren Penns and the Cleveland White Horses in their first two seasons in the NBL (with their second season also having them compete as the championship winning Elmira Colonels in the short-lived New York-Pennsylvania Basketball League at the same time) before becoming the Detroit Eagles. Managed by Dutch Dehnert, they played in the National Basketball League from 1939 until 1941 due to venue issues, then became a barnstorming team soon afterward. The team folded during the 1942–43 season after most of the roster had been drafted to serve in the U.S. military.

The Eagles won the 1941 World Professional Basketball Tournament in Chicago with a 39–37 victory over the Oshkosh All-Stars. They returned to the tournament in 1942, but this time lost to Oshkosh 43–41. The Eagles returned to the WPBT once again, for the last time, in 1943. This time, they were blown out 65–36 by Oshkosh in the quarterfinal round instead of losing to them the championship round like they had done last year, which turned out to be the last known match they played before disbanding due to the effects of World War II.

== Notable players ==
- Buddy Jeannette
- Ed Sadowski
- Press Maravich
- Slim Wintermute
