= Los Angeles Lakers all-time roster =

The Los Angeles Lakers are an American professional basketball team based in Los Angeles, California. They play in the Pacific Division of the Western Conference in the National Basketball Association (NBA). The Lakers' franchise was founded in 1946 in Detroit, Michigan, as the Detroit Gems in the National Basketball League (NBL) before moving the following season to Minneapolis, Minnesota, where the team got its official title from the state's nickname, "Land of 10,000 Lakes". It won the NBL championship during its first year in Minnesota but moved to the rival Basketball Association of America (BAA) the following season where it won the league championship. Following the merger of the NBL and BAA to form the NBA, the Minneapolis Lakers won four NBA Finals before relocating to Los Angeles in the 1960–61 NBA season, becoming the first West Coast team in league history. In the 1960s, the Lakers reached the NBA Finals six times, but lost every series to the Boston Celtics, beginning their long and storied rivalry. In 1972, with future Hall of Famers Wilt Chamberlain, Gail Goodrich, and Jerry West, the Lakers compiled a 33-game winning streak, the longest streak in U.S. professional team sports, and won their sixth title under coach Bill Sharman. The Lakers' popularity soared in the 1980s when they won five additional championships during a nine-year span with the help of Hall of Famers Magic Johnson, Kareem Abdul-Jabbar, James Worthy and coach Pat Riley, the franchise's all-time leader in both regular season and playoff games coached and wins. Two of those championships during that span were against their arch-rivals, the Boston Celtics. With the team of Shaquille O'Neal, Kobe Bryant and Hall of Fame coach Phil Jackson, the Lakers played in four of the first five NBA Finals of the 21st century; winning three consecutively from 2000 to 2002, and losing the fourth in 2004. The Lakers would then conclude the decade with three straight Finals appearances; losing to the Boston Celtics in 2008 but then prevailing with back-to-back championships against the Orlando Magic in 2009 and the Boston Celtics in 2010. The 2010 championship marks the 16th NBA championship in Lakers franchise history. The Lakers would claim their first championship led by LeBron James and Anthony Davis in 2020 after defeating the Miami Heat, marking the 17th and tying the Celtics.

== BAA and NBA ==
This list is composed of players who played at least one BAA or NBA game for the Lakers franchise. Note: Statistics are correct through the end of the 2025–26 season.

G	Guard	G/F	Guard-forward	F	Forward	F/C	Forward-center	C	Center

legend
^	Denotes player who has been inducted to the Naismith Memorial Basketball Hall of Fame
*	Denotes player who has been selected for at least one All-Star Game with the Los Angeles Lakers and is currently on the team roster
^{+}	Denotes player who has been selected for at least one All-Star Game with the Los Angeles Lakers
^{x}	Denotes player who is currently on the Los Angeles Lakers roster
0.0	Denotes the Los Angeles Lakers statistics leader (min. 100 games played for the team for per-game statistics)

=== A to B ===
All-time roster
Player	Pos.	Pre-draft team	Yrs	Seasons	Statistics									Ref.
Player	Pos.	Pre-draft team	Yrs	Seasons	GP	MP	REB	AST	PTS	MPG	RPG	APG	PPG	Ref.
Kareem Abdul-Jabbar^ (#33)	C	UCLA	14	1975–1989	1,093	37,492	10,279	3,652	24,176	34.3	9.4	3.3	22.1	
Tom Abernethy	F	Indiana	2	1976–1978	143	2,695	556	199	932	18.8	3.9	1.4	6.5	
Gary Alcorn	C	Fresno State	1	1960–1961	20	174	50	2	31	8.7	2.5	0.1	1.6	
Lucius Allen	G	UCLA	3	1974–1977	210	6,881	712	1,081	3,351	32.8	3.4	5.1	16.0	
Cliff Anderson	G/F	Saint Joseph's	2	1967–1969	53	383	55	48	161	7.2	1.0	0.9	3.0	
Kostas Antetokounmpo	F/C	Dayton	2	2019–2021	20	76	22	3	19	3.8	1.1	0.2	1.0	
Carmelo Anthony	F	Syracuse	1	2021–2022	69	1,793	288	68	919	26.0	4.2	1.0	13.3	
Trevor Ariza	F	UCLA	3	2007–2009; 2021–2022	130	2,892	518	208	981	22.2	4.0	1.6	7.5	
Chucky Atkins	G	South Florida	1	2004–2005	82	2,903	197	358	1,115	35.4	2.4	4.4	13.6	
D. J. Augustin	G	Texas	1	2021–2022	21	373	27	33	112	17.8	1.3	1.6	5.3	
Deandre Ayton^{x}	C	Arizona	1	2025–2026	72	1,958	575	59	897	27.2	8.0	0.8	12.5	
Lonzo Ball	G	UCLA	2	2017–2019	99	3,203	611	631	993	32.4	6.2	6.4	10.0	
Mo Bamba	C	Texas	1	2022–2023	9	88	41	4	33	9.8	4.6	0.4	3.7	
Jim Barnes	F/C	UTEP	2	1966–1968	122	2,111	661	74	823	17.3	5.4	0.6	6.7	
Matt Barnes	F	UCLA	2	2010–2012	116	2,460	572	197	847	21.2	4.9	1.7	7.3	
Dick Barnett^	G	Tennessee State	3	1962–1965	232	7,190	692	621	3,890	31.0	3.0	2.7	16.8	
Jon Barry	G	Georgia Tech	1	1997–1998	49	374	37	51	121	7.6	0.8	1.0	2.5	
Brandon Bass	F	LSU	1	2015–2016	66	1,342	285	74	473	20.3	4.3	1.1	7.2	
Billy Ray Bates	G	Kentucky State	1	1982–1983	4	27	1	0	5	6.8	0.3	0.0	1.3	
Elgin Baylor^ (#22)	F	Seattle	14	1958–1972	846	33,863	11,463	3,650	23,149	40.0	13.5	4.3	27.4	
Kent Bazemore	G/F	Old Dominion	2	2013–2014; 2021–2022	62	1,188	146	105	434	19.2	2.4	1.7	7.0	
Ed Beach	F	West Virginia	1	1950–1951	11		25	2	22		2.3	0.2	2.0	
Malik Beasley	G/F	Florida State	1	2022–2023	26	621	86	31	289	23.9	3.3	1.2	11.1	
Michael Beasley	F	Kansas State	1	2018–2019	26	277	60	25	181	10.7	2.3	1.0	7.0	
Zelmo Beaty^	C	Prairie View A&M	1	1974–1975	69	1,213	327	74	380	17.6	4.7	1.1	5.5	
Benoit Benjamin	C	Creighton	1	1992–1993	28	306	96	10	126	10.9	3.4	0.4	4.5	
Mario Bennett	F	Arizona State	1	1997–1998	45	354	126	18	177	7.9	2.8	0.4	3.9	
Patrick Beverley	G	Arkansas	1	2022–2023	45	1,211	140	118	288	26.9	3.1	2.6	6.4	
Tarik Black	F/C	Kansas	3	2014–2017	144	2,390	741	89	790	16.6	5.1	0.6	5.5	
Alex Blackwell	F	Monmouth	1	1992–1993	27	109	23	7	34	4.0	0.9	0.3	1.3	
Steve Blake	G	Maryland	4	2010–2014	204	4,884	476	723	1,178	23.9	2.3	3.5	5.8	
John Block	F/C	USC	1	1966–1967	22	118	45	5	64	5.4	2.0	0.2	2.9	
Mike Bloom	F/C	Temple	1	1948–1949	24			15	55			0.6	2.3	
Corie Blount	F	Cincinnati	4	1995–1999	199	2,915	790	116	709	14.6	4.0	0.6	3.6	
Vander Blue	G	Marquette	2	2014–2015; 2017–2018	7	119	10	11	25	17.0	1.4	1.6	3.6	
Tony Bobbitt	G	Cincinnati	1	2004–2005	2	12	3	0	5	6.0	1.5	0.0	2.5	
Andrew Bogut	C	Utah	1	2017–2018	24	216	78	15	36	9.0	3.3	0.6	1.5	
Isaac Bonga	G	(Germany) Skyliners Frankfurt	1	2018–2019	22	120	25	15	19	5.5	1.1	0.7	0.9	
Ron Boone	G/F	Idaho State	2	1978–1980	88	1,689	156	161	642	19.2	1.8	1.8	7.3	
Bob Boozer	F	Kansas State	1	1965–1966	78	1,847	548	87	955	23.7	7.0	1.1	12.2	
Carlos Boozer	F/C	Duke	1	2014–2015	71	1,692	482	95	836	23.8	6.8	1.3	11.8	
Sam Bowie	F/C	Kentucky	2	1993–1995	92	1,781	419	165	529	19.4	4.6	1.8	5.8	
Avery Bradley	G	Texas	2	2019–2020; 2021–2022	111	2,592	251	110	817	23.4	2.3	1.0	7.4	
Adrian Branch	G/F	Maryland	1	1986–1987	32	219	53	16	138	6.8	1.7	0.5	4.3	
Corey Brewer	G/F	Florida	2	2016–2018	78	1,052	145	77	327	13.5	1.9	1.0	4.2	
Jim Brewer	F/C	Minnesota	2	1980–1982	149	2,073	545	97	387	13.9	3.7	0.7	2.6	
Frank Brickowski	F/C	Penn State	1	1986–1987	37	404	97	12	146	10.9	2.6	0.3	3.9	
Bill Bridges	F/C	Kansas	3	1972–1975	154	4,610	1,375	371	1,309	29.9	8.9	2.4	8.5	
MarShon Brooks	G/F	Providence	1	2013–2014	18	228	30	21	115	12.7	1.7	1.2	6.4	
Anthony Brown	G/F	Stanford	1	2015–2016	29	599	70	19	115	20.7	2.4	0.7	4.0	
Chaundee Brown Jr.	G/F	Michigan	1	2021–2022	2	21	2	0	2	10.5	1.0	0.0	1.0	
Chucky Brown	F	NC State	1	1991–1992	36	381	76	23	135	10.6	2.1	0.6	3.8	
George Brown	F	Wayne State	1	1957–1958	1	6	1	0	1	6.0	1.0	0.0	1.0	
Jabari Brown	G	Missouri	1	2014–2015	19	568	36	40	227	29.9	1.9	2.1	11.9	
Kwame Brown	F	Glynn Academy (GA)	3	2005–2008	136	3,619	848	175	1,013	26.6	6.2	1.3	7.4	
Roger Brown	C	Kansas	1	1972–1973	1	5	0	0	1	5.0	0.0	0.0	1.0	
Shannon Brown	G	Michigan State	3	2008–2011	182	3,404	360	214	1,437	18.7	2.0	1.2	7.9	
Sterling Brown	G/F	SMU	1	2022–2023	4	24	8	2	0	6.0	2.0	0.5	0.0	
Tierre Brown	G	McNeese State	1	2004–2005	76	1,066	93	155	333	14.0	1.2	2.0	4.4	
Tony Brown	G/F	Arkansas	1	1990–1991	7	27	4	3	5	3.9	0.6	0.4	0.7	
Troy Brown Jr.	G/F	Oregon	1	2022–2023	76	1,860	308	95	541	24.5	4.1	1.3	7.1	
Kobe Bryant^ (#8, #24)	G	Lower Merion HS (PA)	20	1996–2016	1,346	48,637	7,047	6,306	33,643	36.1	5.2	4.7	25.0	
Thomas Bryant	C	Indiana	2	2017–2018; 2022–2023	56	948	296	35	518	16.9	5.3	0.6	9.3	
Steve Bucknall	G	North Carolina	1	1989–1990	18	75	7	10	23	4.2	0.4	0.6	1.3	
Kobe Bufkin	G	Michigan	1	2025–2026	16	119	13	10	46	7.4	0.8	0.6	2.9	
Reggie Bullock	G/F	North Carolina	1	2018–2019	19	524	50	20	177	27.6	2.6	1.1	9.3	
Bob Burrow	F/C	Kentucky	1	1957–1958	14	171	64	6	55	12.2	4.6	0.4	3.9	
Caron Butler	F	UConn	1	2004–2005	77	2,746	450	146	1,195	35.7	5.8	1.9	15.5	
Dwight Buycks	G	Marquette	1	2014–2015	6	123	12	14	52	20.5	2.0	2.3	8.7	
Andrew Bynum^{+}	C	St. Joseph HS (NJ)	7	2005–2012	392	10,174	3,076	461	4,597	26.0	7.8	1.2	11.7	
Marty Byrnes	F	Syracuse	1	1979–1980	32	194	27	13	63	6.1	0.8	0.4	2.0	

=== C ===
All-time roster
Player	Pos.	Pre-draft team	Yrs	Seasons	Statistics									Ref.
Player	Pos.	Pre-draft team	Yrs	Seasons	GP	MP	REB	AST	PTS	MPG	RPG	APG	PPG	Ref.
Devontae Cacok	F/C	UNC Wilmington	2	2019–2021	21	107	37	2	45	5.1	1.8	0.1	2.1	
José Calderón	G	(Spain) Saski Baskonia	1	2016–2017	24	292	42	51	80	12.2	1.8	2.1	3.3	
Kentavious Caldwell-Pope	G	Georgia	4	2017–2021	292	8,157	946	510	3,228	27.9	3.2	1.7	11.1	
Corky Calhoun	F	Penn	2	1974–1976	133	3,086	577	160	693	23.2	4.3	1.2	5.2	
Demetrius Calip	G	Michigan	1	1991–1992	7	58	5	12	11	8.3	0.7	1.7	1.6	
Mack Calvin	G	USC	1	1976–1977	12	207	16	21	95	17.3	1.3	1.8	7.9	
Elden Campbell	C	Clemson	9	1990–1999	618	15,460	3,604	688	6,408	25.0	5.8	1.1	10.4	
Tony Campbell	G/F	Ohio State	2	1987–1989	76	1,029	157	62	531	13.5	2.1	0.8	7.0	
Derrick Caracter	F	UTEP	1	2010–2011	41	215	43	7	81	5.2	1.0	0.2	2.0	
Don Carlson	G/F	Minnesota	2	1948–1950	112			246	775			2.2	6.9	
Bob Carney	G	Bradley	1	1954–1955	19	244	45	16	69	12.8	2.4	0.8	3.6	
Kenny Carr	F	NC State	3	1977–1980	129	1,939	517	87	872	15.0	4.0	0.7	6.8	
Butch Carter	G	Indiana	1	1980–1981	54	672	65	52	301	12.4	1.2	1.0	5.6	
Maurice Carter	G	LSU	1	2003–2004	4	50	3	2	22	12.5	0.8	0.5	5.5	
Ron Carter	G	VMI	1	1978–1979	46	332	45	25	144	7.2	1.0	0.5	3.1	
Jay Carty	F	Oregon State	1	1968–1969	28	192	58	11	76	6.9	2.1	0.4	2.7	
Alex Caruso	G	Texas A&M	4	2017–2021	184	3,484	425	436	1,082	18.9	2.3	2.4	5.9	
Colin Castleton	C	Florida	1	2023–2024	16	59	12	3	24	3.7	0.8	0.2	1.5	
Cedric Ceballos^{+}	F	Cal State Fullerton	3	1994–1997	144	4,936	1,053	239	3,003	34.3	7.3	1.7	20.9	
John Celestand	G	Villanova	1	1999–2000	16	185	11	20	37	11.6	0.7	1.3	2.3	
Wilt Chamberlain^ (#13)	C	Kansas	5	1968–1973	339	14,815	6,524	1,461	5,985	43.7	19.2	4.3	17.7	
Jerry Chambers	F	Utah	1	1966–1967	69	1,015	208	44	516	14.7	3.0	0.6	7.5	
Tyson Chandler	C	Dominguez (CA)	1	2018–2019	48	786	268	31	147	16.4	5.6	0.6	3.1	
Don Chaney	G	Houston	2	1976–1978	90	2,541	341	325	527	28.2	3.8	3.6	5.9	
Jim Chones	F/C	Marquette	2	1979–1981	164	4,956	1,221	304	1,751	30.2	7.4	1.9	10.7	
Doug Christie	G/F	Pepperdine	2	1992–1994	88	1,847	286	189	814	21.0	3.3	2.1	9.3	
Max Christie	G/F	Michigan State	3	2022–2025	154	2,610	340	147	802	16.9	2.2	1.0	5.2	
Archie Clark^{+}	G	Minnesota	2	1966–1968	157	4,802	560	558	2,410	30.6	3.6	3.6	15.4	
Earl Clark	F	Louisville	1	2012–2013	59	1,363	325	65	428	23.1	5.5	1.1	7.3	
Jordan Clarkson	G	Missouri	4	2014–2018	273	7,681	909	784	3,904	28.1	3.3	2.9	14.3	
Jim Cleamons	G	Ohio State	1	1971–1972	38	201	39	35	98	5.3	1.0	0.9	2.6	
Darren Collison	G	UCLA	1	2021–2022	3	37	4	2	4	12.3	1.3	0.7	1.3	
Lester Conner	G	Oregon State	1	1994–1995	2	5	0	0	2	2.5	0.0	0.0	1.0	
Brian Cook	F	Illinois	5	2003–2008	259	4,152	816	197	1,719	16.0	3.2	0.8	6.6	
Quinn Cook	G	Duke	2	2019–2021	60	570	56	54	257	9.5	0.9	0.9	4.3	
Duane Cooper	G	USC	1	1992–1993	65	645	50	150	156	9.9	0.8	2.3	2.4	
Joe Cooper	F/C	Colorado	1	1982–1983	2	11	2	0	2	5.5	1.0	0.0	1.0	
Michael Cooper^	G	New Mexico	12	1978–1990	873	23,635	2,769	3,666	7,729	27.1	3.2	4.2	8.9	
Mel Counts	F/C	Oregon State	6	1966–1970; 1972–1974	375	7,425	2,587	546	3,643	19.8	6.9	1.5	9.7	
Freddie Crawford	G/F	St. Bonaventure	2	1967–1969	119	2,446	327	249	897	20.6	2.7	2.1	7.5	
Joe Crispin	G	Penn State	1	2001–2002	6	27	1	2	10	4.5	0.2	0.3	1.7	
Javaris Crittenton	G	Georgia Tech	1	2007–2008	22	171	21	18	72	7.8	1.0	0.8	3.3	

=== D to E ===
All-time roster
Player	Pos.	Pre-draft team	Yrs	Seasons	Statistics									Ref.
Player	Pos.	Pre-draft team	Yrs	Seasons	GP	MP	REB	AST	PTS	MPG	RPG	APG	PPG	Ref.
Lloyd Daniels	G	Mt. SAC	1	1994–1995	25	541	56	36	185	21.6	2.2	1.4	7.4	
Troy Daniels	G	VCU	1	2019–2020	41	456	46	14	174	11.1	1.1	0.3	4.2	
Adrian Dantley^	F	Notre Dame	2	1977–1979	116	3,760	746	326	2,128	32.4	6.4	2.8	18.3	
Anthony Davis^{+}	F/C	Kentucky	6	2019–2025	312	10,741	3,419	987	7,739	34.4	11.0	3.2	24.8	
Brad Davis	G	Maryland	2	1977–1979	38	399	36	92	101	10.5	0.9	2.4	2.7	
Ed Davis	F	North Carolina	1	2014–2015	79	1,840	600	94	656	23.3	7.6	1.2	8.3	
Luol Deng	F	Duke	2	2016–2018	57	1,499	295	75	427	26.3	5.2	1.3	7.5	
Walter Devlin	G	George Washington	1	1957–1958	70	1,248	132	167	473	17.8	1.9	2.4	6.8	
Ernie DiGregorio	G	Providence	1	1977–1978	25	332	23	71	98	13.3	0.9	2.8	3.9	
Spencer Dinwiddie	G	Colorado	1	2023–2024	28	678	47	68	191	24.2	1.7	2.4	6.8	
Vlade Divac^	C	(Serbia) Partizan	8	1989–1996; 2004–2005	535	15,517	4,545	1,375	6,531	29.0	8.5	2.6	12.2	
Luka Dončić*	G	(Spain) Real Madrid	2	2024–2026	92	3,273	721	741	2,932	35.6	7.8	8.1	31.9	
Sekou Doumbouya	F	(France) Limoges CSP	1	2021–2022	2	16	6	0	14	8.0	3.0	0.0	7.0	
Larry Drew	G	Missouri	2	1989–1991	128	1,829	132	335	557	14.3	1.0	2.6	4.4	
Andre Drummond	C	UConn	1	2020–2021	21	520	214	30	250	24.8	10.2	1.4	11.9	
Jared Dudley	G/F	Boston College	2	2019–2021	57	445	73	33	74	7.8	1.3	0.6	1.3	
Chris Duhon	G	Duke	1	2012–2013	46	820	68	133	133	17.8	1.5	2.9	2.9	
Walter Dukes	C	Seton Hall	1	1956–1957	71	1,866	794	54	720	26.3	11.2	0.8	10.1	
Jack Dwan	G/F	Loyola (IL)	1	1948–1949	60			129	276			2.2	4.6	
Devin Ebanks	F	West Virginia	3	2010–2013	63	711	122	24	224	11.3	1.9	0.4	3.6	
James Edwards	F/C	Washington	3	1977–1978; 1992–1994	122	1,809	345	92	908	14.8	2.8	0.8	7.4	
Johnny Egan	G	Providence	2	1968–1970	154	3,432	251	431	1,225	22.3	1.6	2.8	8.0	
Ray Ellefson	C	West Texas A&M	1	1948–1949	3			0	2			0.0	0.7	
Wayne Ellington	G	North Carolina	2	2014–2015; 2021–2022	108	2,485	287	135	937	23.0	2.7	1.3	8.7	
Boo Ellis	F	Niagara	2	1958–1960	118	1,873	616	86	607	15.9	5.2	0.7	5.1	
LeRoy Ellis	F/C	St. John's	6	1962–1966; 1971–1973	402	8,569	2,746	259	3,249	21.3	6.8	0.6	8.1	
Tyler Ennis	G	Syracuse	2	2016–2018	76	1,075	121	157	394	14.1	1.6	2.1	5.2	
Bo Erias	F	Niagara	1	1957–1958	18	401	83	26	148	22.3	4.6	1.4	8.2	
Keith Erickson	G/F	UCLA	5	1968–1973	309	8,183	1,392	903	2,851	26.5	4.5	2.9	9.2	
Maurice Evans	G	Texas	2	2006–2008	83	1,828	230	86	669	22.0	2.8	1.0	8.1	
Christian Eyenga	F	(Spain) Joventut Badalona	1	2011–2012	1	19	2	1	8	19.0	2.0	1.0	8.0	

=== F to G ===
All-time roster
Player	Pos.	Pre-draft team	Yrs	Seasons	Statistics									Ref.
Player	Pos.	Pre-draft team	Yrs	Seasons	GP	MP	REB	AST	PTS	MPG	RPG	APG	PPG	Ref.
John Fairchild	F	BYU	1	1965–1966	30	171	45	11	60	5.7	1.5	0.4	2.0	
Jordan Farmar	G	UCLA	5	2006–2010; 2013–2014	342	6,358	654	843	2,492	18.6	1.9	2.5	7.3	
Ron Feiereisel	G	DePaul	1	1955–1956	10	59	6	6	30	5.9	0.6	0.6	3.0	
Ray Felix	C	LIU Brooklyn	3	1959–1962	189	3,684	1,270	121	1,206	19.5	6.7	0.6	6.4	
Arnie Ferrin	G/F	Utah	3	1948–1951	178		271	278	1,037		4.0	1.6	5.8	
Hank Finkel	C	Dayton	1	1966–1967	27	141	64	5	41	5.2	2.4	0.2	1.5	
Dorian Finney-Smith	F	Florida	1	2024–2025	43	1,239	156	59	341	28.8	3.6	1.4	7.9	
Derek Fisher	G	Little Rock	13	1996–2004; 2007–2012	915	23,211	1,892	2,685	7,223	25.4	2.1	2.9	7.9	
Ed Fleming	G/F	Niagara	3	1957–1960	170	3,231	860	266	1,265	19.0	5.1	1.6	7.4	
Don Ford	F	UC Santa Barbara	5	1975–1980	368	7,685	1,405	523	2,618	20.9	3.8	1.4	7.1	
Donnie Forman	G	NYU	1	1948–1949	44			74	179			1.7	4.1	
Greg Foster	F/C	UTEP	1	2000–2001	62	451	112	32	125	7.3	1.8	0.5	2.0	
Larry Foust^{+}	F/C	La Salle	3	1957–1960	191	4,133	1,503	199	2,092	28.7	10.4	1.4	11.0	
Rick Fox	G/F	North Carolina	7	1997–2004	486	12,733	1,784	1,399	4,207	26.2	3.7	2.9	8.7	
Donnie Freeman	G	Illinois	1	1975–1976	64	1,480	180	171	689	23.1	2.8	2.7	10.8	
Jim Fritsche	F/C	Hamline	1	1953–1954	2	8	0	0	1	4.0	0.0	0.0	0.5	
Channing Frye	F/C	Arizona	1	2017–2018	9	150	25	10	52	16.7	2.8	1.1	5.8	
Alex Fudge	F	Florida	1	2023–2024	4	14	2	0	4	3.5	0.5	0.0	1.0	
Wenyen Gabriel	F/C	Kentucky	2	2021–2023	87	1,335	368	48	499	15.3	4.2	0.6	5.7	
Earl Gardner	F	DePauw	1	1948–1949	50			19	89			0.4	1.8	
Dick Garmaker^{+}	G/F	Minnesota	5	1955–1960	324	9,172	1,347	821	4,156	28.3	4.2	2.5	12.8	
Calvin Garrett	F	Oral Roberts	1	1983–1984	41	478	71	31	188	11.7	1.7	0.8	4.6	
Dick Garrett	G	Southern Illinois	1	1969–1970	73	2,318	235	180	846	31.8	3.2	2.5	11.6	
Marc Gasol	C	(Spain) CB Girona	1	2020–2021	52	993	215	109	262	19.1	4.1	2.1	5.0	
Pau Gasol^ (#16)	F/C	(Spain) FC Barcelona	7	2007–2014	429	15,326	4,240	1,508	7,610	35.7	9.9	3.5	17.7	
Devean George	G/F	Augsburg	7	1999–2006	429	8,109	1,433	428	2,572	18.9	3.3	1.0	6.0	
Mel Gibson	G	Western Carolina	1	1963–1964	9	53	4	6	13	5.9	0.4	0.7	1.4	
Harry Giles III	F/C	Duke	1	2023–2024	7	19	4	0	2	2.7	0.6	0.0	0.3	
Normie Glick	F	Loyola Marymount	1	1949–1950	1			0	2			0.0	2.0	
Gail Goodrich^ (#25)	G	UCLA	9	1965–1968; 1970–1976	687	21,765	2,081	2,863	13,044	31.7	3.0	4.2	19.0	
Jordan Goodwin	G	Saint Louis	1	2024–2025	29	543	112	42	161	18.7	3.9	1.4	5.6	
Andrew Goudelock	G	College of Charleston	2	2011–2013	41	425	32	20	175	10.4	0.8	0.5	4.3	
Brian Grant	F	Xavier	1	2004–2005	69	1,136	257	34	263	16.5	3.7	0.5	3.8	
Bud Grant	F	Minnesota	2	1949–1951	96		115	90	249		1.9	0.9	2.6	
Horace Grant	F/C	Clemson	2	2000–2001; 2003–2004	132	3,496	778	192	880	26.5	5.9	1.5	6.7	
Travis Grant	F	Kentucky State	2	1972–1974	36	159	53	7	128	4.4	1.5	0.2	3.6	
A.C. Green^{+}	F/C	Oregon State	9	1985–1993; 1999–2000	735	21,451	5,632	808	7,789	29.2	7.7	1.1	10.6	
Danny Green	G/F	North Carolina	1	2019–2020	68	1,687	225	91	547	24.8	3.3	1.3	8.0	
Devin Green	G	Hampton	1	2005–2006	27	135	24	7	25	5.0	0.9	0.3	0.9	
Jerry Grote	G	Loyola Marymount	1	1964–1965	11	33	4	4	14	3.0	0.4	0.4	1.3	
Pétur Guðmundsson	C	Washington	1	1985–1986	8	128	38	3	58	16.0	4.8	0.4	7.3	

=== H ===
All-time roster
Player	Pos.	Pre-draft team	Yrs	Seasons	Statistics									Ref.
Player	Pos.	Pre-draft team	Yrs	Seasons	GP	MP	REB	AST	PTS	MPG	RPG	APG	PPG	Ref.
Rui Hachimura^{x}	F	Gonzaga	4	2022–2026	228	6,360	970	244	2,795	27.9	4.3	1.1	12.3	
Happy Hairston	F	NYU	6	1969–1975	394	13,670	4,885	920	5,993	34.7	12.4	2.3	15.2	
Jack Haley	F/C	UCLA	1	1991–1992	49	394	95	7	76	8.0	1.9	0.1	1.6	
Dennis Hamilton	F	Arizona State	1	1967–1968	44	378	72	30	121	8.6	1.6	0.7	2.8	
Steve Hamilton	F/C	Morehead State	2	1958–1960	82	1,094	278	43	368	13.3	3.4	0.5	4.5	
Alan Hardy	F	Michigan	1	1980–1981	22	111	19	3	51	5.0	0.9	0.1	2.3	
Derek Harper	G	Illinois	1	1998–1999	45	1,120	67	187	309	24.9	1.5	4.2	6.9	
Ron Harper	G/F	Miami (OH)	2	1999–2001	127	3,181	503	383	864	25.0	4.0	3.0	6.8	
Montrezl Harrell	F/C	Louisville	1	2020–2021	69	1,580	428	73	931	22.9	6.2	1.1	13.5	
Elias Harris	F	Gonzaga	1	2013–2014	2	11	1	1	0	5.5	0.5	0.5	0.0	
Manny Harris	G	Michigan	1	2013–2014	9	180	34	11	73	20.0	3.8	1.2	8.1	
Bob Harrison	G	Michigan	5	1949–1954	309	3,974	543	730	1,754	22.7	2.2	2.4	5.7	
Josh Hart	G	Villanova	2	2017–2019	130	3,176	511	173	1,021	24.4	3.9	1.3	7.9	
Antonio Harvey	F/C	Pfeiffer	2	1993–1995	86	819	161	28	249	9.5	1.9	0.3	2.9	
Billy Hassett	G	Notre Dame	1	1949–1950	42			69	111			1.6	2.6	
Connie Hawkins^	F	Iowa	2	1973–1975	114	3,564	720	499	1,255	31.3	6.3	4.4	11.0	
Tom Hawkins	F	Notre Dame	6	1959–1962; 1966–1969	454	10,984	2,579	518	4,084	24.2	5.7	1.1	9.0	
Nate Hawthorne	G	Southern Illinois	1	1973–1974	33	229	32	23	106	6.9	1.0	0.7	3.2	
Jaxson Hayes^{x}	C	Texas	3	2023–2026	192	3,177	751	150	1,183	16.5	3.9	0.8	6.2	
Nigel Hayes-Davis	F	Wisconsin	1	2017–2018	2	11	0	2	3	5.5	0.0	1.0	1.5	
Spencer Haywood^	F	Detroit Mercy	1	1979–1980	76	1,544	346	93	736	20.3	4.6	1.2	9.7	
Walt Hazzard	G	UCLA	3	1964–1967	225	4,759	561	856	2,109	21.2	2.5	3.8	9.4	
Jerome Henderson	F/C	New Mexico	1	1985–1986	1	3	1	0	4	3.0	1.0	0.0	4.0	
Xavier Henry	G	Kansas	2	2013–2015	52	994	118	54	452	19.1	2.3	1.0	8.7	
Fred Hetzel	F/C	Davidson	1	1970–1971	59	613	149	37	282	10.4	2.5	0.6	4.8	
Bill Hewitt	F	USC	2	1968–1970	95	1,933	473	104	605	20.3	5.0	1.1	6.4	
Roy Hibbert	C	Georgetown	1	2015–2016	81	1,878	398	95	481	23.2	4.9	1.2	5.9	
Mike Higgins	F	Northern Colorado	1	1989–1990	6	18	1	1	1	3.0	0.2	0.2	0.2	
Jordan Hill	F/C	Arizona	4	2011–2015	178	3,914	1,288	172	1,764	22.0	7.2	1.0	9.9	
Lew Hitch	F/C	Kansas State	4	1951–1953; 1954–1956	200	3,005	801	193	766	15.0	4.0	1.0	3.8	
D'Moi Hodge	G	Missouri	1	2023–2024	7	41	0	5	14	5.9	0.0	0.7	2.0	
Brad Holland	G	UCLA	2	1979–1981	79	492	46	45	236	6.2	0.6	0.6	3.0	
Jim Holstein	G/F	Cincinnati	4	1952–1956	198	3,124	583	211	787	15.8	2.9	1.1	4.0	
Jalen Hood-Schifino	G	Indiana	2	2023–2025	23	123	13	9	38	5.3	0.6	0.4	1.7	
Johnny Horan	F	Dayton	1	1955–1956	12	50	6	1	12	4.2	0.5	0.1	1.0	
Ron Horn	F	Indiana	1	1962–1963	28	289	71	10	74	10.3	2.5	0.4	2.6	
Robert Horry	F	Alabama	7	1996–2003	448	11,367	2,462	986	2,842	25.4	5.5	2.2	6.3	
Talen Horton-Tucker	G	Iowa State	3	2019–2022	131	2,896	369	346	1,216	22.1	2.8	2.6	9.3	
Dwight Howard^{+}	C	SACA (GA)	3	2012–2013; 2019–2020; 2021–2022	205	4,999	1,808	188	2,185	24.4	8.8	0.9	10.7	
Lou Hudson^	G	Minnesota	2	1977–1979	160	3,969	328	334	1,891	24.8	2.1	2.1	11.8	
Marcelo Huertas	G	(Spain) Joventut Badalona	2	2015–2017	76	1,106	114	234	300	14.6	1.5	3.1	3.9	
Jay Huff	C	Virginia	1	2021–2022	4	20	4	1	0	5.0	1.0	0.3	0.0	
Hot Rod Hundley^{+}	G	West Virginia	6	1957–1963	431	9,553	1,420	1,455	3,625	22.2	3.3	3.4	8.4	
Lindsey Hunter	G	Jackson State	1	2001–2002	82	1,616	121	129	473	19.7	1.5	1.6	5.8	
Joe Hutton	G	Hamline	2	1950–1952	120	723	187	115	302	12.1	1.6	1.0	2.5	

=== I to J ===
All-time roster
Player	Pos.	Pre-draft team	Yrs	Seasons	Statistics									Ref.
Player	Pos.	Pre-draft team	Yrs	Seasons	GP	MP	REB	AST	PTS	MPG	RPG	APG	PPG	Ref.
Darrall Imhoff^{+}	C	California	4	1964–1968	316	7,930	2,982	628	2,387	25.1	9.4	2.0	7.6	
Andre Ingram	G	American	2	2017–2019	6	79	8	7	24	13.2	1.3	1.2	4.0	
Brandon Ingram	F	Duke	3	2016–2019	190	6,014	897	550	2,639	31.7	4.7	2.9	13.9	
McCoy Ingram	F	Jackson State	1	1957–1958	24	267	116	20	67	11.1	4.8	0.8	2.8	
Jim Jackson	G	Ohio State	1	2005–2006	13	92	12	4	22	7.1	0.9	0.3	1.7	
Tony Jackson	G	Florida State	1	1980–1981	2	14	2	2	2	7.0	1.0	1.0	1.0	
Sam Jacobson	G/F	Minnesota	2	1998–2000	5	30	4	2	18	6.0	0.8	0.4	3.6	
Bronny James^{x}	G	USC	2	2024–2026	69	556	41	73	184	8.1	0.6	1.1	2.7	
LeBron James*	G/F	St. Vincent–St. Mary HS (OH)	8	2018–2026	479	16,732	3,680	3,808	12,402	34.9	7.7	7.9	25.9	
Antawn Jamison	F	North Carolina	1	2012–2013	76	1,636	362	50	712	21.5	4.8	0.7	9.4	
Tony Jaros	G/F	Minnesota	3	1948–1951	183		131	190	824		2.1	1.0	4.5	
Trey Jemison	C	UAB	1	2024–2025	22	226	61	6	57	10.3	2.8	0.3	2.6	
Clay Johnson	G	Missouri	2	1981–1983	55	512	81	31	169	9.3	1.5	0.6	3.1	
Magic Johnson^ (#32)	G	Michigan State	13	1979–1991; 1995–1996	906	33,245	6,559	10,141	17,707	36.7	7.2	11.2	19.5	
Ron Johnson	F	Minnesota	1	1960–1961	8	43	15	1	6	5.4	1.9	0.1	0.8	
Stanley Johnson	F	Arizona	1	2021–2022	48	1,094	155	80	320	22.8	3.2	1.7	6.7	
Trey Johnson	G	Jackson State	1	2010–2011	1	13	0	0	6	13.0	0.0	0.0	6.0	
Wesley Johnson	G/F	Syracuse	2	2013–2015	155	4,485	667	248	1,468	28.9	4.3	1.6	9.5	
Darius Johnson-Odom	G	Marquette	1	2012–2013	4	6	4	1	0	1.5	1.0	0.3	0.0	
Howie Jolliff	F/C	Ohio	3	1960–1963	138	1,739	586	112	388	12.6	4.2	0.8	2.8	
Damian Jones	C	Vanderbilt	2	2020–2021; 2022–2023	30	288	81	5	98	9.6	2.3	0.2	3.3	
Dwight Jones	F/C	Houston	1	1982–1983	32	491	114	22	156	15.3	3.6	0.7	4.9	
Earl Jones	C	District of Columbia	1	1984–1985	2	7	0	0	0	3.5	0.0	0.0	0.0	
Eddie Jones^{+}	G/F	Temple	5	1994–1999	314	10,797	1,186	951	4,784	34.4	3.8	3.0	15.2	
Jemerrio Jones	F	New Mexico State	2	2018–2019; 2021–2022	8	158	52	13	31	19.8	6.5	1.6	3.9	
Jumaine Jones	F	Georgia	1	2004–2005	76	1,830	398	65	577	24.1	5.2	0.9	7.6	
Mason Jones	G	Arkansas	1	2021–2022	4	51	10	4	27	12.8	2.5	1.0	6.8	
DeAndre Jordan	C	Texas A&M	1	2021–2022	32	408	172	13	132	12.8	5.4	0.4	4.1	
Eddie Jordan	G	Rutgers	4	1980–1984	156	1,955	153	411	631	12.5	1.0	2.6	4.0	
Reggie Jordan	G	New Mexico State	1	1993–1994	23	259	67	26	125	11.3	2.9	1.1	5.4	
Johnny Jorgensen	G/F	DePaul	1	1948–1949	48			33	106			0.7	2.2	

=== K to L ===
All-time roster
Player	Pos.	Pre-draft team	Yrs	Seasons	Statistics									Ref.
Player	Pos.	Pre-draft team	Yrs	Seasons	GP	MP	REB	AST	PTS	MPG	RPG	APG	PPG	Ref.
Whitey Kachan	G	DePaul	1	1948–1949	19			12	47			0.6	2.5	
Ed Kalafat	F/C	Minnesota	3	1954–1957	209	4,358	1,182	310	1,474	20.9	5.7	1.5	7.1	
Chris Kaman	C	Central Michigan	1	2013–2014	39	736	229	58	404	18.9	5.9	1.5	10.4	
Jason Kapono	F	UCLA	1	2011–2012	27	269	14	11	54	10.0	0.5	0.4	2.0	
Coby Karl	G	Boise State	1	2007–2008	17	71	14	9	30	4.2	0.8	0.5	1.8	
Ryan Kelly	F	Duke	3	2013–2016	147	3,015	486	207	956	20.5	3.3	1.4	6.5	
Luke Kennard^{x}	G	Duke	1	2025–2026	32	737	83	78	288	23.0	2.6	2.4	9.0	
Jerome Kersey	F	Longwood	1	1996–1997	70	1,766	363	89	476	25.2	5.2	1.3	6.8	
Randolph Keys	G/F	Southern Miss	1	1994–1995	6	83	17	2	20	13.8	2.8	0.3	3.3	
Earnie Killum	G	Stetson	1	1970–1971	4	12	2	0	1	3.0	0.5	0.0	0.3	
Frankie King	G	Western Carolina	1	1995–1996	6	20	2	2	7	3.3	0.3	0.3	1.2	
Jim King	G	Tulsa	3	1963–1966	213	3,932	531	511	1,290	18.5	2.5	2.4	6.1	
Maxi Kleber^{x}	F	(Germany) Würzburg	1	2025–2026	43	461	84	27	86	10.7	2.0	0.6	2.0	
Joe Kleine	C	Arkansas	1	1996–1997	8	30	9	0	6	3.8	1.1	0.0	0.8	
Dalton Knecht^{x}	F	Tennessee	2	2024–2026	132	2,047	291	87	934	15.5	2.2	0.7	7.1	
Travis Knight	C	UConn	3	1996–1997; 1998–2000	171	2,091	576	93	607	12.2	3.4	0.5	3.5	
Christian Koloko	C	Arizona	2	2024–2026	39	348	93	16	90	8.9	2.4	0.4	2.3	
Jim Krebs	F/C	SMU	7	1957–1964	515	10,661	3,177	429	4,128	20.7	6.2	0.8	8.0	
Larry Krystkowiak	F/C	Montana	1	1996–1997	3	11	5	3	3	3.7	1.7	1.0	1.0	
Mitch Kupchak	F/C	North Carolina	4	1981–1982; 1983–1986	173	2,644	672	78	1,113	15.3	3.9	0.5	6.4	
C. J. Kupec	F/C	Michigan	2	1975–1977	98	963	222	58	411	9.8	2.3	0.6	4.2	
Kyle Kuzma	F	Utah	4	2017–2021	276	8,195	1,555	526	4,206	29.7	5.6	1.9	15.2	
Bo Lamar	G	Louisiana	1	1976–1977	71	1,165	92	177	502	16.4	1.3	2.5	7.1	
Jeff Lamp	G/F	Virginia	2	1987–1989	40	183	34	15	62	4.6	0.9	0.4	1.6	
Mark Landsberger	F/C	Arizona State	4	1979–1983	206	2,950	1,069	85	970	14.3	5.2	0.4	4.7	
Stu Lantz	G	Nebraska	2	1974–1976	109	2,283	269	234	773	20.9	2.5	2.1	7.1	
Jake LaRavia^{x}	F	Wake Forest	1	2025–2026	82	2,061	326	145	674	25.1	4.0	1.8	8.2	
Rudy LaRusso^{+}	F/C	Dartmouth	8	1959–1967	582	18,886	5,571	1,215	8,231	32.5	9.6	2.1	14.1	
Butch Lee	G	Marquette	1	1979–1980	11	31	8	9	14	2.8	0.7	0.8	1.3	
Bobby Leonard^	G	Indiana	5	1956–1961	324	8,289	950	906	2,852	25.6	2.9	2.8	8.8	
Alex Len	C	Maryland	1	2024–2025	10	122	31	8	22	12.3	3.1	0.8	2.2	
Ronnie Lester	G	Iowa	2	1984–1986	59	500	36	134	156	8.5	0.6	2.3	2.6	
Maxwell Lewis	F	Pepperdine	2	2023–2025	41	132	6	8	15	3.2	0.1	0.2	0.4	
Jeremy Lin	G	Harvard	1	2014–2015	74	1,907	196	339	832	25.8	2.6	4.6	11.2	
Brook Lopez	C	Stanford	1	2017–2018	74	1,735	294	126	961	23.4	4.0	1.7	13.0	
Stan Love	F	Oregon	2	1973–1975	81	1,129	267	74	504	13.9	3.3	0.9	6.2	
Clyde Lovellette^	C	Kansas	4	1953–1957	282	8,626	3,145	454	4,859	30.6	11.2	1.6	17.2	
Maurice Lucas	F/C	Marquette	1	1985–1986	77	1,750	566	84	785	22.7	7.4	1.1	10.2	
Tyronn Lue	G	Nebraska	3	1998–2001	61	802	50	87	253	13.1	0.8	1.4	4.1	
George Lynch	F	North Carolina	3	1993–1996	203	3,727	803	209	1,313	18.4	4.0	1.0	6.5	
Mike Lynn	F	UCLA	1	1969–1970	44	403	64	30	119	9.2	1.5	0.7	2.7	

=== M ===
All-time roster
Player	Pos.	Pre-draft team	Yrs	Seasons	Statistics									Ref.
Player	Pos.	Pre-draft team	Yrs	Seasons	GP	MP	REB	AST	PTS	MPG	RPG	APG	PPG	Ref.
Scott Machado	G	Iona	1	2018–2019	4	19	0	3	10	4.8	0.0	0.8	2.5	
Oliver Mack	G	East Carolina	1	1979–1980	27	155	22	20	51	5.7	0.8	0.7	1.9	
Mark Madsen	F	Stanford	3	2000–2003	183	2,072	473	106	478	11.3	2.6	0.6	2.6	
Karl Malone^	F	Louisiana Tech	1	2003–2004	42	1,373	367	163	554	32.7	8.7	3.9	13.2	
Chris Mañon^{x}	F	Vanderbilt	1	2025–2026	9	46	10	3	7	5.1	1.1	0.3	0.8	
Nick Mantis	G	Northwestern	1	1959–1960	10	71	6	9	21	7.1	0.6	0.9	2.1	
Kendall Marshall	G	North Carolina	1	2013–2014	54	1,564	155	477	430	29.0	2.9	8.8	8.0	
Slater Martin^	G	Texas	7	1949–1956	484	13,130	1,346	2,007	4,813	37.6	3.2	4.1	9.9	
Wes Matthews	G	Wisconsin	2	1986–1988	101	1,238	113	238	497	12.3	1.1	2.4	4.9	
Wesley Matthews	G/F	Marquette	1	2020–2021	58	1,130	93	54	279	19.5	1.6	0.9	4.8	
Skylar Mays	G	LSU	1	2023–2024	17	77	6	10	22	4.5	0.4	0.6	1.3	
D. J. Mbenga	C	(Belgium) Spirou Gilly	3	2007–2010	98	732	159	23	230	7.5	1.6	0.2	2.3	
Bob McAdoo^	C	North Carolina	4	1981–1985	224	4,475	990	212	2,701	20.0	4.4	0.9	12.1	
Mel McCants	F	Purdue	1	1989–1990	13	65	6	2	22	5.0	0.5	0.2	1.7	
Willie McCarter	G	Drake	2	1969–1971	116	2,230	205	219	847	19.2	1.8	1.9	7.3	
George McCloud	G/F	Florida State	1	1996–1997	23	286	36	17	95	12.4	1.6	0.7	4.1	
Mac McClung	G	Texas Tech	1	2021–2022	1	22	3	1	6	22.0	3.0	1.0	6.0	
Jelani McCoy	C	UCLA	1	2001–2002	21	104	25	7	26	5.0	1.2	0.3	1.2	
Jim McDaniels	F/C	Western Kentucky	1	1975–1976	35	242	74	15	91	6.9	2.1	0.4	2.6	
JaVale McGee	C	Nevada	2	2018–2020	143	2,801	956	89	1,343	19.6	6.7	0.6	9.4	
Mike McGee	G/F	Michigan	5	1981–1986	302	4,541	600	277	2,465	15.0	2.0	0.9	8.2	
Bill McGill	F/C	Utah	1	1964–1965	8	37	12	3	15	4.6	1.5	0.4	1.9	
Kevin McKenna	G/F	Creighton	1	1981–1982	36	237	29	14	67	6.6	0.8	0.4	1.9	
Aaron McKie	G	Temple	2	2005–2007	24	252	38	24	29	10.5	1.6	1.0	1.2	
Alfonzo McKinnie	F	Green Bay	1	2020–2021	39	258	54	6	122	6.6	1.4	0.2	3.1	
Ben McLemore	G	Kansas	1	2020–2021	21	368	34	11	168	17.5	1.6	0.5	8.0	
Jim McMillian	F	Columbia	3	1970–1973	242	7,750	1,299	563	3,714	32.0	5.4	2.3	15.3	
Mark McNamara	F/C	California	2	1988–1990	72	508	163	13	215	7.1	2.3	0.2	3.0	
Bob McNeill	G	Saint Joseph's	1	1961–1962	29	229	23	40	52	7.9	0.8	1.4	1.8	
Josh McRoberts	F	Duke	1	2011–2012	50	718	171	51	138	14.4	3.4	1.0	2.8	
Slava Medvedenko	F	(Ukraine) Budivelnyk	6	2000–2006	249	3,259	730	134	1,348	13.1	2.9	0.5	5.4	
Jodie Meeks	G	Kentucky	2	2012–2014	155	4,219	365	207	1,827	27.2	2.4	1.3	11.8	
Cliff Meely	F/C	Colorado	1	1975–1976	20	139	45	9	64	7.0	2.3	0.5	3.2	
Chuck Mencel	G	Minnesota	2	1955–1957	141	2,821	347	333	983	20.0	2.5	2.4	7.0	
Chris Mihm	C	Texas	4	2004–2006; 2007–2009	175	3,794	986	134	1,457	21.7	5.6	0.8	8.3	
George Mikan^	C	DePaul	7	1948–1954; 1955–1956	439	8,350	4,167	1,245	10,156	34.4	13.4	2.8	23.1	
Vern Mikkelsen^	F	Hamline	10	1949–1959	699	18,443	5,940	1,515	10,063	32.5	9.4	2.2	14.4	
Anthony Miller	F	Michigan State	2	1994–1996	73	650	177	39	225	8.9	2.4	0.5	3.1	
Shake Milton	G	SMU	1	2024–2025	30	345	53	38	116	11.5	1.8	1.3	3.9	
Steve Mix	F	Toledo	1	1982–1983	1	17	1	2	9	17.0	1.0	2.0	9.0	
Malik Monk	G	Kentucky	1	2021–2022	76	2,139	256	218	1,048	28.1	3.4	2.9	13.8	
Darius Morris	G	Michigan	2	2011–2013	67	852	73	97	240	12.7	1.1	1.4	3.6	
Markieff Morris	F	Kansas	3	2019–2021; 2024–2025	83	1,523	326	98	525	18.3	3.9	1.2	6.3	
Adam Morrison	F	Gonzaga	2	2008–2010	39	285	40	21	84	7.3	1.0	0.5	2.2	
Timofey Mozgov	C	(Russia) BC Khimki	1	2016–2017	54	1,104	264	43	401	20.4	4.9	0.8	7.4	
Erwin Mueller	F/C	San Francisco	1	1967–1968	39	973	222	78	325	24.9	5.7	2.0	8.3	
Allen Murphy	G	Louisville	1	1976–1977	2	18	4	0	5	9.0	2.0	0.0	2.5	
Troy Murphy	F/C	Notre Dame	1	2011–2012	59	956	191	51	188	16.2	3.2	0.9	3.2	
Tracy Murray	F	UCLA	1	2002–2003	31	193	23	12	61	6.2	0.7	0.4	2.0	
Mike Muscala	F/C	Bucknell	1	2018–2019	17	265	44	14	100	15.6	2.6	0.8	5.9	
Sviatoslav Mykhailiuk	G/F	Kansas	1	2018–2019	39	420	34	33	127	10.8	0.9	0.8	3.3	

=== N to P ===
All-time roster
Player	Pos.	Pre-draft team	Yrs	Seasons	Statistics									Ref.
Player	Pos.	Pre-draft team	Yrs	Seasons	GP	MP	REB	AST	PTS	MPG	RPG	APG	PPG	Ref.
Larry Nance Jr.	F/C	Wyoming	3	2015–2018	168	3,630	965	197	1,158	21.6	5.7	1.2	6.9	
Cotton Nash	F	Kentucky	1	1964–1965	25	167	35	10	53	6.7	1.4	0.4	2.1	
Steve Nash^	G	Santa Clara	2	2012–2014	65	1,940	171	419	738	29.8	2.6	6.4	11.4	
Swen Nater	C	UCLA	1	1983–1984	69	829	264	27	311	12.0	3.8	0.4	4.5	
Don Nelson^	F	Iowa	2	1963–1965	119	1,644	396	100	511	13.8	3.3	0.8	4.3	
Johnny Neumann	G/F	Ole Miss	1	1976–1977	59	888	63	137	346	15.1	1.1	2.3	5.9	
Chuck Nevitt	C	NC State	2	1984–1986	15	84	27	5	22	5.6	1.8	0.3	1.5	
Ira Newble	F	Miami (OH)	1	2007–2008	6	31	11	3	7	5.2	1.8	0.5	1.2	
Norm Nixon^{+}	G	Duquesne	6	1977–1983	485	17,847	1,312	3,846	7,938	36.8	2.7	7.9	16.4	
Zach Norvell Jr.	G	Gonzaga	1	2019–2020	2	5	1	0	0	2.5	0.5	0.0	0.0	
Kendrick Nunn	G	Oakland	1	2022–2023	39	528	55	34	262	13.5	1.4	0.9	6.7	
David Nwaba	G	Cal Poly	1	2016–2017	20	397	63	14	120	19.9	3.2	0.7	6.0	
Lamar Odom	F	Rhode Island	7	2004–2011	519	18,204	4,906	1,944	7,092	35.1	9.5	3.7	13.7	
Jawann Oldham	C	Seattle	1	1989–1990	3	9	1	1	5	3.0	0.3	0.3	1.7	
Quincy Olivari	G	Xavier	1	2024–2025	2	10	0	1	3	5.0	0.0	0.5	1.5	
Shaquille O'Neal^ (#34)	C	LSU	8	1996–2004	514	19,329	6,090	1,593	13,895	37.6	11.8	3.1	27.0	
Kevin O'Shea	G	Notre Dame	1	1950–1951	63		125	100	271		2.0	1.6	4.3	
Keith Owens	F	UCLA	1	1991–1992	20	80	15	3	26	4.0	0.8	0.2	1.3	
Jannero Pargo	G	Arkansas	2	2002–2004	47	405	43	50	99	8.6	0.9	1.1	2.1	
Smush Parker	G	Fordham	2	2005–2007	164	5,230	477	530	1,848	31.9	2.9	3.2	11.3	
Myles Patrick	F	Auburn	1	1980–1981	3	9	2	1	5	3.0	0.7	0.3	1.7	
Ruben Patterson	F	Cincinnati	1	1998–1999	24	144	30	2	65	6.0	1.3	0.1	2.7	
Jim Paxson Sr.	G/F	Dayton	1	1956–1957	71	1,274	266	86	446	17.9	3.7	1.2	6.3	
Gary Payton^	G	Oregon State	1	2003–2004	82	2,825	342	449	1,199	34.5	4.2	5.5	14.6	
Gary Payton II	G	Oregon State	1	2017–2018	11	115	27	12	39	10.5	2.5	1.1	3.5	
Anthony Peeler	G	Missouri	4	1992–1996	253	5,746	593	500	2,691	22.7	2.3	2.0	10.6	
Mike Penberthy	G	Master's College	2	2000–2002	56	863	65	73	272	15.4	1.2	1.3	4.9	
Sam Perkins	F/C	North Carolina	3	1990–1993	185	6,425	1,473	377	2,697	34.7	8.0	2.0	14.6	
John Pilch	F	Wyoming	1	1951–1952	9	41	9	2	5	4.6	1.0	0.2	0.6	
Scotty Pippen Jr.	G	Vanderbilt	1	2022–2023	6	32	4	2	14	5.3	0.7	0.3	2.3	
Jim Pollard^	F	Stanford	7	1948–1955	438	9,391	2,487	1,417	5,762	35.4	7.8	3.2	13.2	
Josh Powell	F	NC State	2	2008–2010	123	1,284	292	62	419	10.4	2.4	0.5	3.4	
Jim Price	G	Louisville	4	1972–1975; 1978–1979	225	5,002	659	747	2,227	22.2	2.9	3.3	9.9	
Ronnie Price	G	Utah Valley	1	2014–2015	43	982	69	165	221	22.8	1.6	3.8	5.1	
Taurean Prince	F	Baylor	1	2023–2024	78	2,108	230	119	697	27.0	2.9	1.5	8.9	
Laron Profit	G/F	Maryland	1	2005–2006	25	279	43	15	104	11.2	1.7	0.6	4.2	

=== R ===
All-time roster
Player	Pos.	Pre-draft team	Yrs	Seasons	Statistics									Ref.
Player	Pos.	Pre-draft team	Yrs	Seasons	GP	MP	REB	AST	PTS	MPG	RPG	APG	PPG	Ref.
Vladimir Radmanović	F	(Serbia) Crvena zvezda	3	2006–2009	166	3,240	512	227	1,177	19.5	3.1	1.4	7.1	
Kurt Rambis	F	Santa Clara	9	1981–1988; 1993–1995	569	10,059	3,134	483	2,816	17.7	5.5	0.8	4.9	
Julius Randle	F/C	Kentucky	4	2014–2018	238	6,622	2,119	618	3,219	27.8	8.9	2.6	13.5	
Theo Ratliff	F/C	Wyoming	1	2010–2011	10	71	13	3	2	7.1	1.3	0.3	0.2	
Austin Reaves^{x}	G	Oklahoma	5	2021–2026	331	10,202	1,307	1,476	5,239	30.8	3.9	4.5	15.8	
Cam Reddish	G/F	Duke	2	2023–2025	81	1,573	165	70	365	19.4	2.0	0.9	4.5	
Davon Reed	G	Miami (FL)	1	2022–2023	8	27	4	4	8	3.4	0.5	0.5	1.0	
Hub Reed	F/C	Oklahoma City	1	1963–1964	46	386	107	23	76	8.4	2.3	0.5	1.7	
J. R. Reid	F	North Carolina	1	1998–1999	25	473	99	23	126	18.9	4.0	0.9	5.0	
Glen Rice	F	Michigan	2	1998–2000	107	3,515	426	247	1,744	32.9	4.0	2.3	16.3	
Mitch Richmond^	G	Kansas State	1	2001–2002	64	709	94	57	260	11.1	1.5	0.9	4.1	
Isaiah Rider	G	UNLV	1	2000–2001	67	1,206	156	111	507	18.0	2.3	1.7	7.6	
Pat Riley^	G/F	Kentucky	6	1970–1976	296	4,633	462	497	2,316	15.7	1.6	1.7	7.8	
David Rivers	G	Notre Dame	1	1988–1989	47	440	43	106	134	9.4	0.9	2.3	2.9	
Rick Roberson	F/C	Cincinnati	2	1969–1971	139	2,914	976	139	982	21.0	7.0	1.0	7.1	
Fred Roberts	F/C	BYU	1	1995–1996	33	317	47	26	122	9.6	1.4	0.8	3.7	
Marv Roberts	F/C	Utah State	1	1976–1977	28	209	25	19	58	7.5	0.9	0.7	2.1	
Cliff Robinson	F	USC	1	1991–1992	9	78	19	9	29	8.7	2.1	1.0	3.2	
Flynn Robinson	G	Wyoming	2	1971–1973	70	1,054	122	146	669	15.1	1.7	2.1	9.6	
Rumeal Robinson	G	Michigan	1	1996–1997	15	126	10	13	45	8.4	0.7	0.9	3.0	
Thomas Robinson	F	Kansas	1	2016–2017	48	560	223	31	241	11.7	4.6	0.6	5.0	
Dave Robisch	F/C	Kansas	2	1977–1979	135	1,898	464	137	644	14.1	3.4	1.0	4.8	
John Roche	G	South Carolina	1	1975–1976	15	52	3	6	8	3.5	0.2	0.4	0.5	
Dennis Rodman^	F	Southeastern Oklahoma State	1	1998–1999	23	657	258	30	49	28.6	11.2	1.3	2.1	
Rajon Rondo	G	Kentucky	3	2018–2020; 2021–2022	112	2,642	434	674	821	23.6	3.9	6.0	7.3	
Sean Rooks	C	Arizona	3	1996–1999	146	1,475	353	75	502	10.1	2.4	0.5	3.4	
Kareem Rush	G	Missouri	3	2002–2005	162	2,207	201	130	698	13.6	1.2	0.8	4.3	
Bryon Russell	F	Long Beach State	1	2003–2004	72	945	146	71	289	13.1	2.0	1.0	4.0	
Cazzie Russell	G/F	Michigan	3	1974–1977	196	5,263	592	441	2,847	26.9	3.0	2.3	14.5	
D'Angelo Russell	G	Ohio State	5	2015–2017; 2022–2025	265	7,843	861	1,290	4,062	29.6	3.2	4.9	15.3	
Matt Ryan	F	Chattanooga	1	2022–2023	12	129	14	4	47	10.8	1.2	0.3	3.9	

=== S ===
All-time roster
Player	Pos.	Pre-draft team	Yrs	Seasons	Statistics									Ref.
Player	Pos.	Pre-draft team	Yrs	Seasons	GP	MP	REB	AST	PTS	MPG	RPG	APG	PPG	Ref.
Robert Sacre	C	Gonzaga	4	2012–2016	189	2,745	593	126	787	14.5	3.1	0.7	4.2	
John Salley	F/C	Georgia Tech	1	1999–2000	45	303	65	26	71	6.7	1.4	0.6	1.6	
Soumaila Samake	C	Cincinnati Stuff	1	2002–2003	13	77	23	4	22	5.9	1.8	0.3	1.7	
Jamal Sampson	F/C	California	1	2003–2004	10	130	52	7	29	13.0	5.2	0.7	2.9	
Frank Saul	G/F	Seton Hall	3	1951–1954	166	4,360	300	317	1,183	26.3	2.1	1.9	7.1	
Herm Schaefer	G/F	Indiana	2	1948–1950	123			388	932			3.2	7.6	
Danny Schayes	F/C	Syracuse	1	1993–1994	13	133	34	8	36	10.2	2.6	0.6	2.8	
Dick Schnittker	F	Ohio State	5	1953–1958	335	6,744	1,219	438	2,735	20.1	3.6	1.3	8.2	
Dennis Schröder	F	(Germany) Phantoms Braunschweig	2	2020–2021; 2022–2023	127	3,942	376	649	1,771	31.0	3.0	5.1	13.9	
Howie Schultz	F/C	Hamline	2	1951–1953	106	1,775	326	131	359	16.7	3.1	1.2	3.4	
Byron Scott	G	Arizona State	11	1983–1993; 1996–1997	846	25,533	2,534	2,365	12,780	30.2	3.0	2.8	15.1	
Charlie Scott^	G/F	North Carolina	1	1977–1978	48	1,393	148	235	560	29.0	3.1	4.9	11.7	
Shea Seals	G	Tulsa	1	1997–1998	4	9	4	0	4	2.3	1.0	0.0	1.0	
Frank Selvy^{+}	G/F	Furman	6	1957–1958; 1959–1964	364	9,936	1,301	1,157	3,756	27.3	3.6	3.2	10.3	
Ramon Sessions	G	Nevada	1	2011–2012	23	701	87	142	291	30.5	3.8	6.2	12.7	
Chuck Share	C	Bowling Green	1	1959–1960	3									
Brian Shaw	G	UC Santa Barbara	4	1999–2003	284	4,613	751	651	1,145	16.2	2.6	2.3	4.0	
Bob Sims	G/F	Pepperdine	1	1961–1962	19	171	27	12	63	9.0	1.4	0.6	3.3	
Myer Skoog	G	Minnesota	6	1951–1957	341	9,193	1,133	903	2,800	27.0	3.3	2.6	8.2	
Marcus Smart^{x}	G	Oklahoma State	1	2025–2026	62	1,769	172	185	579	28.5	2.8	3.0	9.3	
Bobby Smith	G	West Virginia	2	1959–1960; 1961–1962	13	137	33	14	37	10.5	2.5	1.1	2.8	
Don Smith	G/F	Minnesota	1	1948–1949	8			2	6			0.3	0.8	
Elmore Smith	C	Kentucky State	2	1973–1975	155	5,263	1,716	295	1,819	34.0	11.1	1.9	11.7	
J. R. Smith	G	St. Benedict's Prep. (NJ)	1	2019–2020	6	79	5	3	17	13.2	0.8	0.5	2.8	
Joe Smith	F	Maryland	1	2010–2011	12	44	18	3	6	3.7	1.5	0.3	0.5	
Tony Smith	G	Marquette	5	1990–1995	316	4,908	536	557	1,824	15.5	1.7	1.8	5.8	
Nick Smith Jr.^{x}	G	Arkansas	1	2025–2026	30	375	23	31	185	12.5	0.8	1.0	6.2	
Mike Smrek	C	Canisius	2	1986–1988	83	654	122	13	208	7.9	1.5	0.2	2.5	
Ron Sobieszczyk	G	DePaul	1	1959–1960	1	13	2	2	2	13.0	2.0	2.0	2.0	
Rory Sparrow	G	Villanova	1	1991–1992	42	471	27	79	124	11.2	0.6	1.9	3.0	
Art Spoelstra	C	Western Kentucky	1	1957–1958	50	1,098	281	51	382	22.0	5.6	1.0	7.6	
Larry Spriggs	F	Howard	3	1983–1986	156	2,126	369	211	838	13.6	2.4	1.4	5.4	
Lance Stephenson	G/F	Cincinnati	1	2018–2019	68	1,123	215	140	491	16.5	3.2	2.1	7.2	
Derek Strong	F	Xavier	1	1995–1996	63	746	178	32	214	11.8	2.8	0.5	3.4	
Gene Stump	G/F	DePaul	1	1949–1950	23			23	61			1.0	2.7	
Sun Yue	G	(China) Beijing Olympians	1	2008–2009	10	28	0	2	6	2.8	0.0	0.2	0.6	
Don Sunderlage	G	Illinois	1	1954–1955	45	404	56	37	114	9.0	1.2	0.8	2.5	
Cole Swider	F	Syracuse	1	2022–2023	7	41	7	4	9	5.9	1.0	0.6	1.3	

=== T to Z ===
All-time roster
Player	Pos.	Pre-draft team	Yrs	Seasons	Statistics									Ref.
Player	Pos.	Pre-draft team	Yrs	Seasons	GP	MP	REB	AST	PTS	MPG	RPG	APG	PPG	Ref.
Earl Tatum	G/F	Marquette	2	1976–1978	93	1,912	326	188	989	20.6	3.5	2.0	10.6	
Terry Teagle	G/F	Baylor	2	1990–1992	164	3,100	364	195	1,695	18.9	2.2	1.2	10.3	
Adou Thiero^{x}	F	Arkansas	1	2025–2026	25	149	28	10	47	6.0	1.1	0.4	1.9	
Irving Thomas	F	Florida State	1	1990–1991	26	108	31	10	46	4.2	1.2	0.4	1.8	
Isaiah Thomas	G	Washington	2	2017–2018; 2021–2022	21	557	44	91	302	26.5	2.1	4.3	14.4	
Billy Thompson	F	Louisville	2	1986–1988	68	800	180	61	346	11.8	2.6	0.9	5.1	
Mychal Thompson	F/C	Minnesota	5	1986–1991	335	7,641	1,797	206	2,990	22.8	5.4	0.6	8.9	
Sedale Threatt	G	West Virginia Tech	5	1991–1996	386	11,312	898	2,018	4,594	29.3	2.3	5.2	11.9	
Drew Timme^{x}	F	Gonzaga	1	2025–2026	27	235	33	23	92	8.7	1.2	0.9	3.4	
Jack Tingle	F	Kentucky	1	1948–1949	2			1	2			0.5	1.0	
Ray Tolbert	F	Indiana	1	1987–1988	14	82	20	5	42	5.9	1.4	0.4	3.0	
Juan Toscano-Anderson	F	Marquette	1	2022–2023	30	365	61	25	81	12.2	2.0	0.8	2.7	
Armel Traoré	F	(France) ADA Blois	1	2024–2025	9	67	15	11	14	7.4	1.7	0.1	1.6	
John Trapp	F	UNLV	2	1971–1973	63	794	194	44	342	12.6	3.1	0.7	5.4	
John Tresvant	F/C	Seattle	2	1969–1971	28	287	86	27	160	10.3	3.1	1.0	5.7	
Ronny Turiaf	F	Gonzaga	3	2005–2008	173	2,706	602	199	944	15.6	3.5	1.2	5.5	
Bill Turner	F	Akron	1	1972–1973	19	117	25	11	38	6.2	1.3	0.6	2.0	
Ime Udoka	F	Portland State	1	2003–2004	4	28	5	2	8	7.0	1.3	0.5	2.0	
Nick Van Exel^{+}	G	Cincinnati	5	1993–1998	378	13,147	1,062	2,749	5,633	34.8	2.8	7.3	14.9	
Jarred Vanderbilt^{x}	F	Kentucky	4	2022–2026	156	2,915	785	203	772	18.7	5.0	1.3	4.9	
Gabe Vincent	G	UC Santa Barbara	3	2023–2025	112	2,304	128	156	632	20.6	1.1	1.4	5.6	
Jay Vincent	F	Michigan State	1	1989–1990	24	200	26	10	90	8.3	1.1	0.4	3.8	
Sasha Vujačić	G	(Italy) Amatori Udine	7	2004–2011	420	5,988	700	485	2,033	14.3	1.7	1.2	4.8	
Von Wafer	G	Florida State	1	2005–2006	16	73	8	4	20	4.6	0.5	0.3	1.3	
Milt Wagner	G	Louisville	1	1987–1988	40	380	28	61	152	9.5	0.7	1.5	3.8	
Moritz Wagner	F/C	Michigan	1	2018–2019	43	446	85	24	207	10.4	2.0	0.6	4.8	
Dion Waiters	G/F	Syracuse	1	2019–2020	7	165	13	17	83	23.6	1.9	2.4	11.9	
Lonnie Walker IV	G/F	Miami (FL)	1	2022–2023	56	1,297	109	64	654	23.2	1.9	1.1	11.7	
Samaki Walker	F	Louisville	2	2001–2003	136	2,898	849	128	756	21.3	6.2	0.9	5.6	
Paul Walther	G/F	Tennessee	1	1949–1950	22			10	75			0.5	3.4	
Luke Walton	F	Arizona	9	2003–2012	493	8,529	1,408	1,121	2,434	17.3	2.9	2.3	4.9	
Cornell Warner	F/C	Jackson State	2	1975–1977	95	2,682	791	117	645	28.2	8.3	1.2	6.8	
Kermit Washington	F/C	American	5	1973–1978	214	3,934	1,433	183	1,343	18.4	6.7	0.9	6.3	
Bobby Watson	G	Kentucky	1	1954–1955										
Travis Wear	F	UCLA	1	2017–2018	17	228	38	7	75	13.4	2.2	0.4	4.4	
Walt Wesley	C	Kansas	1	1975–1976	1	7	1	1	4	7.0	1.0	1.0	4.0	
Jerry West^ (#44)	G	West Virginia	14	1960–1974	932	36,571	5,366	6,238	25,192	39.2	5.8	6.7	27.0	
Russell Westbrook	G	UCLA	2	2021–2023	130	4,169	901	941	2,268	32.1	6.9	7.2	17.4	
John Wetzel	G/F	Virginia Tech	1	1967–1968	38	434	84	51	139	11.4	2.2	1.3	3.7	
Gene Wiley	C	Wichita State	4	1962–1966	300	6,386	2,194	252	1,273	21.3	7.3	0.8	4.2	
Jamaal Wilkes^ (#52)	G/F	UCLA	8	1977–1985	575	19,270	3,119	1,474	10,601	33.5	5.4	2.6	18.4	
Bob Williams	F	Florida A&M	2	1955–1957	24	193	59	7	70	8.0	2.5	0.3	2.9	
Derrick Williams	F	Arizona	1	2017–2018	2	9	1	0	2	4.5	0.5	0.0	1.0	
Johnathan Williams	F	Gonzaga	1	2018–2019	24	372	99	13	157	15.5	4.1	0.5	6.5	
Lou Williams	G	South Gwinnett HS (GA)	2	2015–2017	125	3,310	301	350	2,106	26.5	2.4	2.8	16.8	
Ron Williams	G	West Virginia	1	1975–1976	9	158	19	21	44	17.6	2.1	2.3	4.9	
Shammond Williams	G	North Carolina	1	2006–2007	30	345	40	31	94	11.5	1.3	1.0	3.1	
Shawne Williams	F	Memphis	1	2013–2014	36	751	167	30	202	20.9	4.6	0.8	5.6	
Trevor Wilson	F	UCLA	1	1993–1994	5	126	28	12	51	25.2	5.6	2.4	10.2	
Dylan Windler	G/F	Belmont	1	2023–2024	8	28	3	6	12	3.5	0.4	0.8	1.5	
Brian Winters	G/F	South Carolina	1	1974–1975	68	1,516	138	195	794	22.3	2.0	2.9	11.7	
Christian Wood	F/C	UNLV	1	2023–2024	50	872	254	49	347	17.4	5.1	1.0	6.9	
Orlando Woolridge	F	Notre Dame	2	1988–1990	136	2,912	455	154	1,503	21.4	3.3	1.1	11.1	
Metta World Peace	F	St. John's	6	2009–2013; 2015–2017	358	10,015	1,297	699	3,197	28.0	3.6	2.0	8.9	
James Worthy^ (#42)	F	North Carolina	12	1982–1994	926	30,001	4,708	2,791	16,320	32.4	5.1	3.0	17.6	
Wayne Yates	C	Memphis	1	1961–1962	37	263	94	16	72	7.1	2.5	0.4	1.9	
Nick Young	G/F	USC	4	2013–2017	220	5,399	497	228	2,890	24.5	2.3	1.0	13.1	
Ivica Zubac	C	(Serbia) Mega Basket	3	2016–2019	114	1,535	444	80	726	13.5	3.9	0.7	6.4	

== NBL ==
This list is composed of players who played at least one NBL game for the franchise.

All-time roster
Player	Pos.	College team	Yrs	Seasons	Statistics			Ref.
Player	Pos.	College team	Yrs	Seasons	GP	PTS	PPG	Ref.
Dave Latter	C-F	N/A	1	1946–1947	43	321	7.8	
Fred Campbell	G	Southern Illinois	1	1946–1947	39	268	6.8	
Eddie Parry	F-G	N/A	1	1946–1947	34	235	6.9	
Del Loranger	F-G	N/A	1	1946–1947	27	233	8.6	
Tom Meyer	F-C	N/A	1	1946–1947	24	188	7.8	
Paul Juntunen	G-F	Wayne State	1	1946–1947	43	178	4.1	
Herb Scheffler	C-F	Illinois / Oklahoma	1	1946–1947	33	126	3.8	
Howie McCarty	F-G	Wayne State	1	1946–1947	16	121	7.6	
Wilbert King	G	N/A	1	1946–1947	14	115	8.2	
Bob Dykstra	C	Simpson	1	1946–1947	14	58	4.1	
Vaughn Waddell	G	N/A	1	1946–1947	8	25	3.1	
Chuck Hawley	G-F	N/A	1	1946–1947	12	17	1.4	
Frank Sabo	G	Wayne State	1	1946–1947	3	16	5.3	
Charles Perry	G	Tuskegee	1	1946–1947	5	15	3.0	
Pat Rooney	F-G	N/A	1	1946–1947	5	11	2.2	
Frank Mekules	F	Michigan State	1	1946–1947	3	6	2.0	
Walt Czarnecki	F	Detroti Mercy	1	1946–1947	4	5	1.3	
Curt Henderson	G	N/A	1	1946–1947	4	4	1.0	
George Mikan	C	DePaul	1	1947–1948	56	1,195	21.3	
Jim Pollard	F-C	Stanford	1	1947–1948	59	760	12.9	
Don Carlson	G-F	Minnesota	1	1947–1948	58	475	8.2	
Jack Dwan	F-G	Loyola Chicago	1	1947–1948	55	306	5.6	
Herm Schaefer	G-F	Indiana	1	1947–1948	54	288	5.3	
Tony Jaros	F-G	Minnesota	1	1947–1948	58	273	4.7	
Don Smith	G-F	Minnesota	1	1947–1948	57	200	3.5	
Paul Napolitano	F-G	San Francisco	1	1947–1948	52	155	3.0	
Johnny Jorgensen	G-F	N/A	1	1947–1948	38	101	2.7	
Bill Durkee	G-F	California	1	1947–1948	23	41	1.8	
Bob Gerber	C-F	Toledo	1	1947–1948	15	36	2.4	
Ken Exel	G	Minnesota	1	1947–1948	5	4	0.8	
Joe Patanelli	F	N/A	1	1947–1948	5	4	0.8	
Jack Rocker	C-F	California	1	1947–1948	5	4	0.8	
Warren Ajax	F-C	Minnesota	1	1947–1948	3	1	0.3	
Ted Cook	G	Tennessee	1	1947–1948	2	0	0.0	
