= List of Los Angeles Lakers seasons =

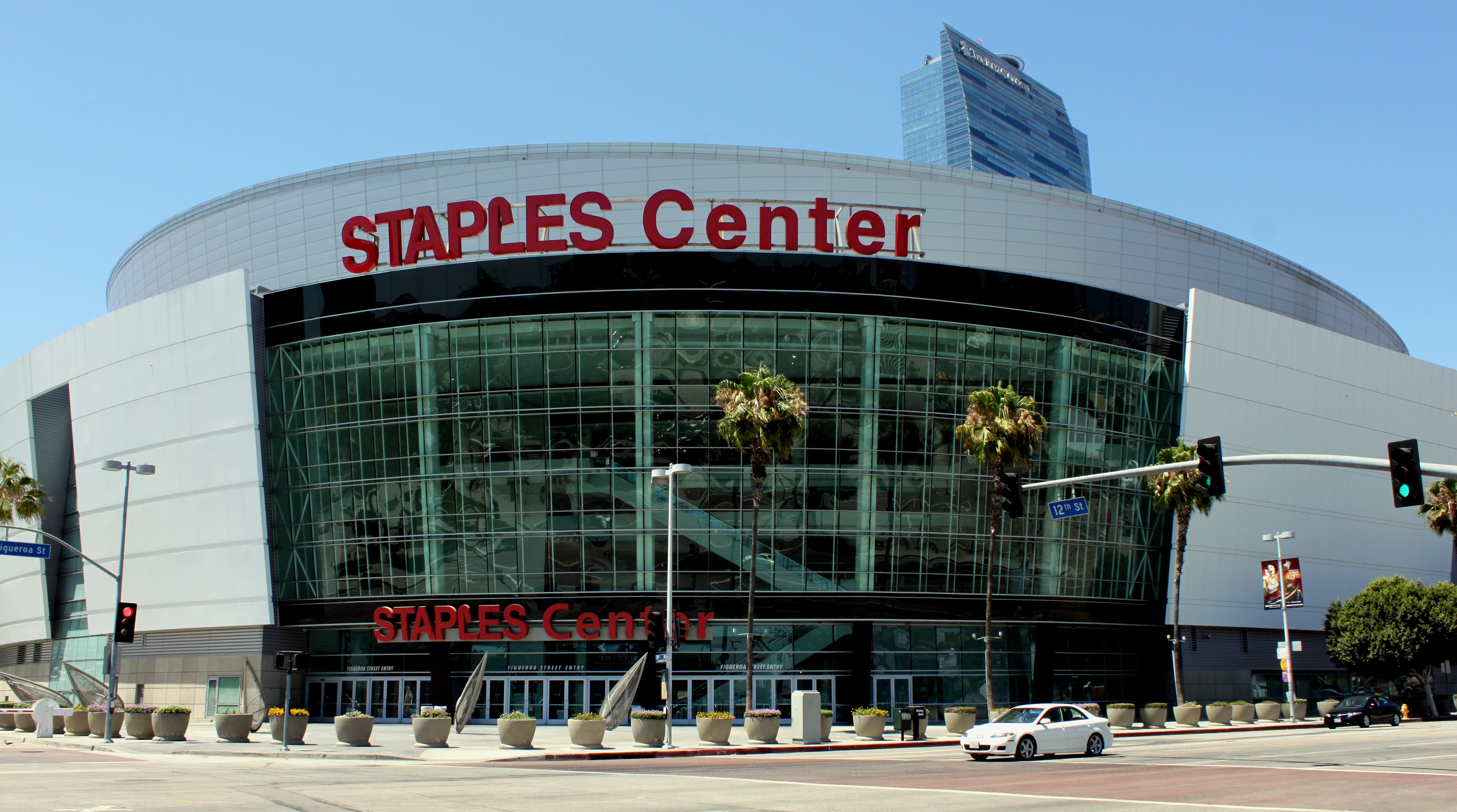
Crypto.com Arena, previously the Staples Center, has been home to the Lakers since the 1999–2000 NBA season.

The Los Angeles Lakers are an American professional basketball team based in Los Angeles that competes in the National Basketball Association (NBA). Since 1999, the Lakers have played their home games at Crypto.com Arena. The franchise began in 1946 as the Detroit Gems of the National Basketball League (NBL). After one season, a new ownership relocated the team to Minneapolis, Minnesota, and renamed the team as the Minneapolis Lakers. The Lakers won the 1948 NBL championship before joining the rival Basketball Association of America, where they won the 1949 BAA championship. Following the merger of the NBL and the BAA into the NBA in 1949, the Lakers won four of the next five NBA championships. After struggling financially in the late 1950s, they relocated to Los Angeles before the 1960–61 season. The Lakers went on to lose all of their six appearances in the NBA Finals in the 1960s, despite the presence of Elgin Baylor and Jerry West. In 1972, the Lakers compiled a 33-game winning streak, the longest streak in U.S. professional team sports, and won their sixth title, under coach Bill Sharman. The Lakers' popularity soared in the 1980s when they won five additional championships during a nine-year span with the help of Hall of Famers Magic Johnson, Kareem Abdul-Jabbar, James Worthy and coach Pat Riley, the franchise's all-time leader in both regular season and playoff games coached and wins. Two of those championships during that span were against their arch-rivals, the Boston Celtics. With the help of Shaquille O'Neal, Kobe Bryant, and Hall of Fame coach Phil Jackson, the Lakers played in seven NBA Finals between 2000 and 2010, winning three of them consecutively from 2000 to 2002, losing the next two in 2004 and 2008, and winning in 2009 and 2010; the last three appearances were without O'Neal.

The Lakers hold records for having (at the end of the 2014–15 NBA season) the most wins (3,125), the highest winning percentage (.620), the most NBA Finals appearances (32) of any NBA franchise, second-fewest non-playoff seasons with seven and are second NBA championships with 17, behind the Boston Celtics' 18. They have won 60+ regular season games 11 times, trailing only the Boston Celtics in this category.

The team struggled during the mid to late 2010s, during which they suffered the longest playoff drought in franchise history, failing to qualify for the postseason for six seasons. Before that stretch, they had missed the playoffs only five times in their entire existence up to 2013.

The Lakers' fortunes turned around following the signing of LeBron James in the summer of 2018 and a trade for Anthony Davis in 2019. The team finished the 2020 regular season as the first seed in the Western Conference for the first time since 2010 and won the 2020 NBA Finals, their first championship since 2010.

== Table key ==
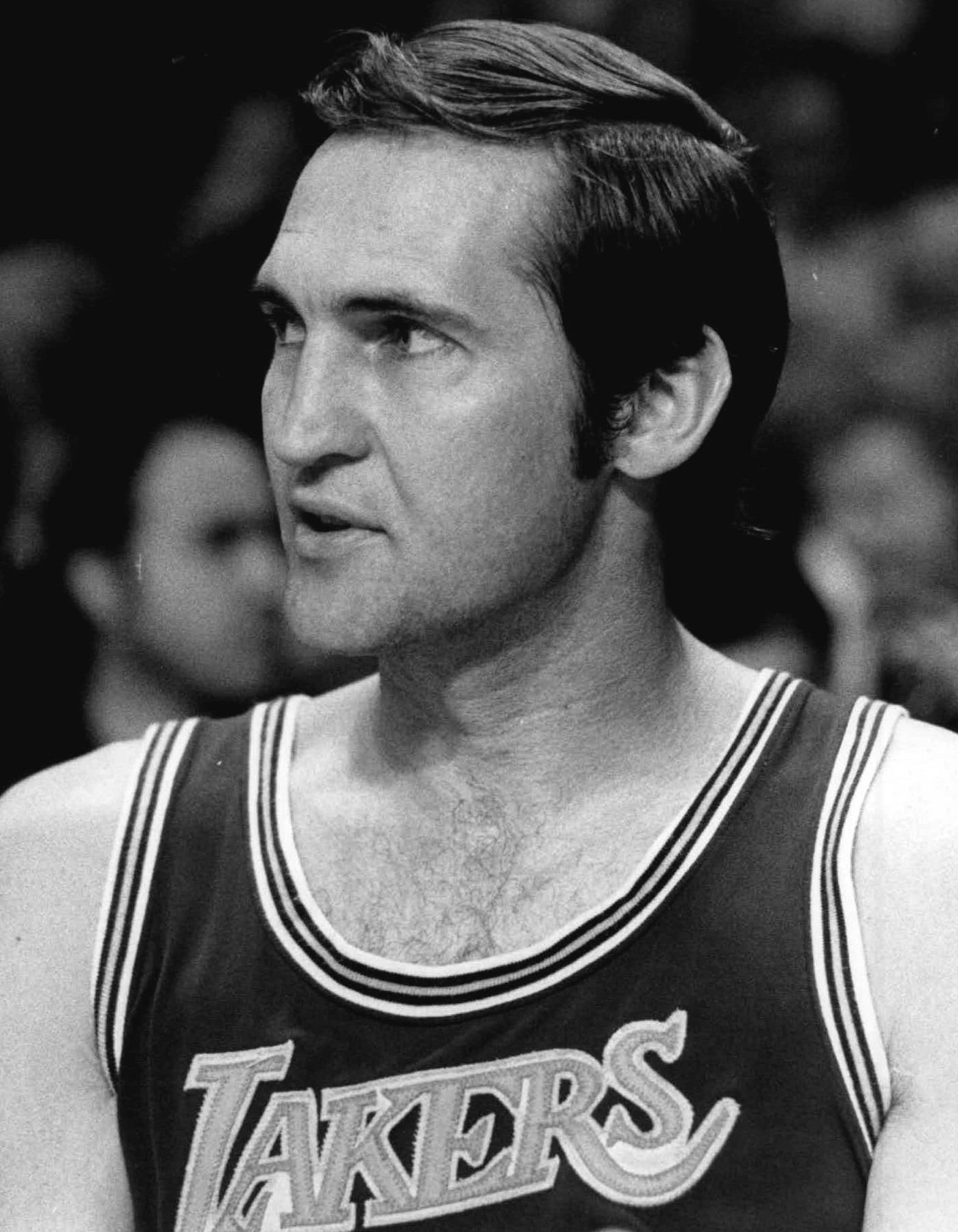
Jerry West played in nine of the Lakers' 32 NBA Finals appearances, from 1962 to 1973.

ASG MVP	All-Star Game Most Valuable Player
COY	Coach of the Year
DPOY	Defensive Player of the Year
Finish	Final position in league or division standings
GB	Games behind first-place team in division (Note: The formula is: $\mathrm{Games}\ \mathrm{behind} = \frac{(\mathrm{Team A's}\ \mathrm{wins}-\mathrm{Team B's}\ \mathrm{wins}) + (\mathrm{Team B's}\ \mathrm{losses} - \mathrm{Team A's}\ \mathrm{losses})}{\mathrm{2}}$)
L	Number of regular season losses
EOY	Executive of the Year
FMVP	Finals Most Valuable Player
JWKC	J. Walter Kennedy Citizenship
MVP	Most Valuable Player
ROY	Rookie of the Year
SIX	Sixth Man of the Year
W	Number of regular season wins

== Seasons ==
Note: Statistics are correct as of the end of the 2025–26 season.

NBL champions	NBA champions	Conference champions	Division champions	Playoff berth	Play-in berth

Season	League	Conference	Finish	Division	Finish	Wins	Losses	Win%	GB	Playoffs	Awards	Head coach	Ref.
Detroit Gems
1946–47	NBL	—	—	Western	6th	4	40	.091	24	—	—	Joel Mason; Fred Campbell	
Minneapolis Lakers
1947–48 (Note: The team relocated to Minneapolis.)	NBL	—	—	Western	1st	43	17	.717	—	Won opening round (All-Stars) 3–1; Won division semifinals (Blackhawks) 2–0; Won NBL championship (Royals) 3–1	George Mikan (MVP)	John Kundla	
1948–49	BAA	—	—	Western	2nd	44	16	.733	1	Won division semifinals (Stags) 2–0; Won division finals (Royals) 2–0; Won BAA Finals (Capitols) 4–2	—	John Kundla	
1949–50	NBA	—	—	Central	1st (Note: Though the Lakers had the same record as the Rochester Royals in the Central Division, the Lakers won the tiebreaker and finished first.)	51	17	.750	—	Won division semifinals (Stags) 2–0; Won division finals (Pistons) 2–0; Won NBA semifinals (Packers) 2–0; Won NBA Finals (Nationals) 4–2	—	John Kundla	
1950–51	NBA	—	—	Western	1st	44	24	.647	—	Won division semifinals (Olympians) 2–1; Lost division finals (Royals) 3–1	—	John Kundla	
1951–52	NBA	—	—	Western	2nd	40	26	.606	1	Won division semifinals (Olympians) 2–0; Won division finals (Royals) 3–1; Won NBA Finals (Knicks) 4–3	—	John Kundla	
1952–53	NBA	—	—	Western	1st	48	22	.686	—	Won division semifinals (Olympians) 2–0; Won division finals (Pistons) 3–2; Won NBA Finals (Knicks) 4–1	George Mikan (ASG MVP)	John Kundla	
1953–54	NBA	—	—	Western	1st	46	26	.639	—	Advanced round-robin divisional semifinals 3–0; Won division finals (Royals) 2–1; Won NBA Finals (Nationals) 4–3	—	John Kundla	
1954–55	NBA	—	—	Western	2nd	40	32	.556	3	Won division semifinals (Royals) 2–1; Lost division finals (Pistons) 3–1	—	John Kundla	
1955–56	NBA	—	—	Western	2nd (Note: Though the Lakers had the same record as the St. Louis Hawks in the Western Division, the Lakers won the tiebreaker and finished second.)	33	39	.458	4	Lost division semifinals (Hawks) 2–1	—	John Kundla	
1956–57	NBA	—	—	Western	2nd (Note: Though the Lakers had the same record as the St. Louis Hawks and Fort Wayne Pistons in the Western Division, the Lakers lost the tiebreaker and finished second.)	34	38	.472	—	Won division semifinals (Pistons) 2–0; Lost division finals (Hawks) 3–0	—	John Kundla	
1957–58	NBA	—	—	Western	4th	19	53	.264	22	—	—	George Mikan; John Kundla	
1958–59	NBA	—	—	Western	2nd	33	39	.458	16	Won division semifinals (Pistons) 2–1; Won division finals (Hawks) 4–2; Lost NBA Finals (Celtics) 4–0	Elgin Baylor (Note: Baylor shared the All-Star Game Most Valuable Player award with Bob Pettit of the St. Louis Hawks.) (ROY, ASG MVP)	John Kundla	
1959–60	NBA	—	—	Western	3rd	25	50	.333	21	Won division semifinals (Pistons) 2–0; Lost division finals (Hawks) 4–3	—	John Castellani; Jim Pollard	
Los Angeles Lakers
1960–61 (Note: The team relocated to Los Angeles.)	NBA	—	—	Western	2nd	36	43	.456	15	Won division semifinals (Pistons) 3–2; Lost division finals (Hawks) 4–3	—	Fred Schaus	
1961–62	NBA	—	—	Western	1st	54	26	.675	—	Won division finals (Pistons) 4–2; Lost NBA Finals (Celtics) 4–3	—	Fred Schaus	
1962–63	NBA	—	—	Western	1st	53	27	.663	—	Won division finals (Hawks) 4–3; Lost NBA Finals (Celtics) 4–2	—	Fred Schaus	
1963–64	NBA	—	—	Western	3rd	42	38	.525	6	Lost division semifinals (Hawks) 3–2	—	Fred Schaus	
1964–65	NBA	—	—	Western	1st	49	31	.613	—	Won division finals (Bullets) 4–2; Lost NBA Finals (Celtics) 4–1	—	Fred Schaus	
1965–66	NBA	—	—	Western	1st	45	35	.563	—	Won division finals (Hawks) 4–3; Lost NBA Finals (Celtics) 4–3	—	Fred Schaus	
1966–67	NBA	—	—	Western	3rd	36	45	.444	8	Lost division semifinals (Warriors) 3–0	—	Fred Schaus	
1967–68	NBA	—	—	Western	2nd	52	30	.634	4	Won division semifinals (Bulls) 4–1; Won division finals (Warriors) 4–0; Lost NBA Finals (Celtics) 4–2	—	Butch van Breda Kolff	
1968–69	NBA	—	—	Western	1st	55	27	.671	—	Won division semifinals (Warriors) 4–2; Won division finals (Hawks) 4–1; Lost NBA Finals (Celtics) 4–3	Jerry West (FMVP)	Butch van Breda Kolff	
1969–70	NBA	—	—	Western	2nd	46	36	.561	2	Won division semifinals (Suns) 4–3; Won division finals (Hawks) 4–0; Lost NBA Finals (Knicks) 4–3	—	Joe Mullaney	
1970–71	NBA	Western	2nd	Pacific (Note: Conferences were introduced and Western Division was split into the Midwest and Pacific divisions.)	1st	48	34	.585	—	Won conference semifinals (Bulls) 4–3; Lost conference finals (Bucks) 4–1	—	Joe Mullaney	
1971–72	NBA	Western	1st	Pacific	1st	69	13	.841	—	Won conference semifinals (Bulls) 4–0; Won conference finals (Bucks) 4–2; Won NBA Finals (Knicks) 4–1	Wilt Chamberlain (FMVP); Bill Sharman (COY); Jerry West (ASG MVP)	Bill Sharman	
1972–73	NBA	Western	2nd	Pacific	1st	60	22	.732	—	Won conference semifinals (Bulls) 4–3; Won conference finals (Warriors) 4–1; Lost NBA Finals (Knicks) 4–1	—	Bill Sharman	
1973–74	NBA	Western	2nd	Pacific	1st	47	35	.573	—	Lost conference semifinals (Bucks) 4–1	—	Bill Sharman	
1974–75	NBA	Western	9th	Pacific	5th	30	52	.366	18	—	—	Bill Sharman	
1975–76	NBA	Western	6th	Pacific	4th	40	42	.488	19	—	Kareem Abdul-Jabbar (MVP)	Bill Sharman	
1976–77	NBA	Western	1st	Pacific	1st	53	29	.646	—	Won conference semifinals (Warriors) 4–3; Lost conference finals (Trail Blazers) 4–0	Kareem Abdul-Jabbar (MVP)	Jerry West	
1977–78	NBA	Western	5th	Pacific	4th	45	37	.549	13	Lost first round (SuperSonics) 2–1	—	Jerry West	
1978–79	NBA	Western	5th	Pacific	3rd	47	35	.573	5	Won first round (Nuggets) 2–1; Lost conference semifinals (SuperSonics) 4–1	—	Jerry West	
1979–80	NBA	Western	1st	Pacific	1st	60	22	.732	—	Won conference semifinals (Suns) 4–1; Won conference finals (SuperSonics) 4–1; Won NBA Finals (76ers) 4–2	Kareem Abdul-Jabbar (MVP); Magic Johnson (FMVP)	Jack McKinney; Paul Westhead	
1980–81	NBA	Western	3rd	Pacific	2nd	54	28	.659	3	Lost first round (Rockets) 2–1	—	Paul Westhead	
1981–82	NBA	Western	1st	Pacific	1st	57	25	.695	—	Won conference semifinals (Suns) 4–0; Won conference finals (Spurs) 4–0; Won NBA Finals (76ers) 4–2	Magic Johnson (FMVP)	Paul Westhead; Pat Riley	
1982–83	NBA	Western	1st	Pacific	1st	58	24	.707	—	Won conference semifinals (Trail Blazers) 4–1; Won conference finals (Spurs) 4–2; Lost NBA Finals (76ers) 4–0	—	Pat Riley	
1983–84	NBA	Western	1st	Pacific	1st	54	28	.659	—	Won first round (Kings) 3–0; Won conference semifinals (Mavericks) 4–1; Won conference finals (Suns) 4–2; Lost NBA Finals (Celtics) 4–3	—	Pat Riley	
1984–85	NBA	Western	1st	Pacific	1st	62	20	.756	—	Won first round (Suns) 3–0; Won conference semifinals (Trail Blazers) 4–1; Won conference finals (Nuggets) 4–1; Won NBA Finals (Celtics) 4–2	Kareem Abdul-Jabbar (FMVP)	Pat Riley	
1985–86	NBA	Western	1st	Pacific	1st	62	20	.756	—	Won first round (Spurs) 3–0; Won conference semifinals (Mavericks) 4–2; Lost conference finals (Rockets) 4–1	Michael Cooper (JWKC)	Pat Riley	
1986–87	NBA	Western	1st	Pacific	1st	65	17	.793	—	Won first round (Nuggets) 3–0; Won conference semifinals (Warriors) 4–1; Won conference finals (SuperSonics) 4–0; Won NBA Finals (Celtics) 4–2	Magic Johnson (MVP, FMVP); Michael Cooper (DPOY)	Pat Riley	
1987–88	NBA	Western	1st	Pacific	1st	62	20	.756	—	Won first round (Spurs) 3–0; Won conference semifinals (Jazz) 4–3; Won conference finals (Mavericks) 4–3; Won NBA Finals (Pistons) 4–3	James Worthy (FMVP)	Pat Riley	
1988–89	NBA	Western	1st	Pacific	1st	57	25	.695	—	Won first round (Trail Blazers) 3–0; Won conference semifinals (SuperSonics) 4–0; Won conference finals (Suns) 4–0; Lost NBA Finals (Pistons) 4–0	Magic Johnson (MVP)	Pat Riley	
1989–90	NBA	Western	1st	Pacific	1st	63	19	.768	—	Won first round (Rockets) 3–1; Lost conference semifinals (Suns) 4–1	Magic Johnson (MVP, ASG MVP); Pat Riley (COY)	Pat Riley	
1990–91	NBA	Western	3rd	Pacific	2nd	58	24	.707	5	Won first round (Rockets) 3–0; Won conference semifinals (Warriors) 4–1; Won conference finals (Trail Blazers) 4–2; Lost NBA Finals (Bulls) 4–1	—	Mike Dunleavy	
1991–92	NBA	Western	8th	Pacific	6th	43	39	.524	14	Lost first round (Trail Blazers) 3–1	Magic Johnson (ASG MVP, JWKC)	Mike Dunleavy	
1992–93	NBA	Western	8th	Pacific	5th	39	43	.476	23	Lost first round (Suns) 3–2	—	Randy Pfund	
1993–94	NBA	Western	9th	Pacific	5th	33	49	.402	30	—	—	Randy Pfund; Bill Bertka; Magic Johnson	
1994–95	NBA	Western	5th	Pacific	3rd	48	34	.585	11	Won first round (SuperSonics) 3–1; Lost conference semifinals (Spurs) 4–2	Del Harris (COY); Jerry West (EOY)	Del Harris	
1995–96	NBA	Western	4th	Pacific	2nd	53	29	.646	11	Lost first round (Rockets) 3–1	—	Del Harris	
1996–97	NBA	Western	4th	Pacific	2nd	56	26	.683	1	Won first round (Trail Blazers) 3–1; Lost conference semifinals (Jazz) 4–1	—	Del Harris	
1997–98	NBA	Western	3rd	Pacific	2nd (Note: Though the Lakers had the same record as the Seattle SuperSonics in the Pacific Division, the Lakers lost the tiebreaker and finished second.)	61	21	.744	—	Won first round (Trail Blazers) 3–1; Won conference semifinals (SuperSonics) 4–1; Lost conference finals (Jazz) 4–0	—	Del Harris	
1998–99 (Note: Due to a lockout, the season did not start until February 5, 1999, and all 29 teams played a shortened 50 game regular season schedule.)	NBA	Western	4th	Pacific	2nd	31	19	.620	4	Won first round (Rockets) 3–1; Lost conference semifinals (Spurs) 4–0	—	Del Harris; Bill Bertka; Kurt Rambis	
1999–00	NBA	Western	1st	Pacific	1st	67	15	.817	—	Won first round (Kings) 3–2; Won conference semifinals (Suns) 4–1; Won conference finals (Trail Blazers) 4–3; Won NBA Finals (Pacers) 4–2	Shaquille O'Neal (Note: O'Neal shared the All-Star Game Most Valuable Player award with Tim Duncan of the San Antonio Spurs.) (MVP, FMVP, ASG MVP)	Phil Jackson	
2000–01	NBA	Western	2nd	Pacific	1st	56	26	.683	—	Won first round (Trail Blazers) 3–0; Won conference semifinals (Kings) 4–0; Won conference finals (Spurs) 4–0; Won NBA Finals (76ers) 4–1	Shaquille O'Neal (FMVP)	Phil Jackson	
2001–02	NBA	Western	3rd	Pacific	2nd	58	24	.707	3	Won first round (Trail Blazers) 3–0; Won conference semifinals (Spurs) 4–1; Won conference finals (Kings) 4–3; Won NBA Finals (Nets) 4–0	Shaquille O'Neal (FMVP); Kobe Bryant (ASG MVP)	Phil Jackson	
2002–03	NBA	Western	5th	Pacific	2nd (Note: Though the Lakers had the same record as the Portland Trail Blazers in the Pacific Division, the Lakers won the tiebreaker and finished second.)	50	32	.610	9	Won first round (Timberwolves) 4–2; Lost conference semifinals (Spurs) 4–2	—	Phil Jackson	
2003–04	NBA	Western	2nd	Pacific	1st	56	26	.683	—	Won first round (Rockets) 4–1; Won conference semifinals (Spurs) 4–2; Won conference finals (Timberwolves) 4–2; Lost NBA Finals (Pistons) 4–1	Shaquille O'Neal (ASG MVP)	Phil Jackson	
2004–05	NBA	Western	11th	Pacific	4th (Note: Though the Lakers had the same record as the Golden State Warriors in the Pacific Division, the Lakers won the tiebreaker and finished fourth.)	34	48	.415	28	—	—	Rudy Tomjanovich; Frank Hamblen	
2005–06	NBA	Western	7th	Pacific	3rd	45	37	.549	9	Lost first round (Suns) 4–3	—	Phil Jackson	
2006–07	NBA	Western	7th	Pacific	2nd (Note: Though the Lakers had the same record as the Golden State Warriors in the Pacific Division, the Lakers won the tiebreaker and finished second.)	42	40	.512	19	Lost first round (Suns) 4–1	Kobe Bryant (ASG MVP)	Phil Jackson	
2007–08	NBA	Western	1st	Pacific	1st	57	25	.695	—	Won first round (Nuggets) 4–0; Won conference semifinals (Jazz) 4–2; Won conference finals (Spurs) 4–1; Lost NBA Finals (Celtics) 4–2	Kobe Bryant (MVP)	Phil Jackson	
2008–09	NBA	Western	1st	Pacific	1st	65	17	.793	—	Won first round (Jazz) 4–1; Won conference semifinals (Rockets) 4–3; Won conference finals (Nuggets) 4–2; Won NBA Finals (Magic) 4–1	Kobe Bryant (Note: Bryant shared the All-Star Game Most Valuable Player award with Shaquille O'Neal of the Phoenix Suns.) (FMVP, ASG MVP)	Phil Jackson	
2009–10	NBA	Western	1st	Pacific	1st	57	25	.695	—	Won first round (Thunder) 4–2; Won conference semifinals (Jazz) 4–0; Won conference finals (Suns) 4–2; Won NBA Finals (Celtics) 4–3	Kobe Bryant (FMVP)	Phil Jackson	
2010–11	NBA	Western	2nd	Pacific	1st	57	25	.695	—	Won first round (Hornets) 4–2; Lost conference semifinals (Mavericks) 4–0	Kobe Bryant (ASG MVP); Lamar Odom (SIX); Ron Artest (JWKC)	Phil Jackson	
2011–12 (Note: Due to a lockout, the season did not start until December 25, 2011, and all 30 teams played a shortened 66-game regular season schedule.)	NBA	Western	3rd	Pacific	1st	41	25	.621	—	Won first round (Nuggets) 4–3; Lost conference semifinals (Thunder) 4–1	Pau Gasol (JWKC)	Mike Brown	
2012–13	NBA	Western	7th	Pacific	3rd	45	37	.549	11	Lost first round (Spurs) 4–0	—	Mike Brown; Bernie Bickerstaff; Mike D'Antoni	
2013–14	NBA	Western	14th	Pacific	5th	27	55	.329	30	—	—	Mike D'Antoni	
2014–15	NBA	Western	14th	Pacific	5th	21	61	.256	46	—	—	Byron Scott	
2015–16	NBA	Western	15th	Pacific	5th	17	65	.207	56	—	—	Byron Scott	
2016–17	NBA	Western	14th	Pacific	4th	26	56	.317	41	—	—	Luke Walton	
2017–18	NBA	Western	11th	Pacific	3rd	35	47	.427	23	—	—	Luke Walton	
2018–19	NBA	Western	10th	Pacific	4th	37	45	.451	20	—	—	Luke Walton	
2019–20	NBA	Western	1st	Pacific	1st	52	19	.732	—	Won first round (Trail Blazers) 4–1; Won conference semifinals (Rockets) 4–1; Won conference finals (Nuggets) 4–1; Won NBA Finals (Heat) 4–2	LeBron James (FMVP)	Frank Vogel	
2020–21	NBA	Western	7th	Pacific	3rd	42	30	.583	10	Lost first round (Suns) 4–2	—	Frank Vogel	
2021–22	NBA	Western	11th	Pacific	4th	33	49	.402	31	—	—	Frank Vogel	
2022–23	NBA	Western	7th	Pacific	5th	43	39	.524	5	Won first round (Grizzlies) 4–2; Won conference semifinals (Warriors) 4–2; Lost conference finals (Nuggets) 4–0	—	Darvin Ham	
2023–24	NBA	Western	7th (Note: Earned 7th seed after beating the New Orleans Pelicans in the NBA play-in tournament.)	Pacific	3rd	47	35	.573	4	Lost first round (Nuggets) 4–1	—	Darvin Ham	
2024–25	NBA	Western	3rd	Pacific	1st	50	32	.610	—	Lost first round (Timberwolves) 4–1	—	JJ Redick	
2025–26	NBA	Western	4th	Pacific	1st	53	29	.646	—	Won first round (Rockets) 4–2; Lost conference semifinals (Thunder) 4–0	—	JJ Redick	

== All-time records ==
Note: Statistics are correct as of the end of the 2025–26 NBA season.

=== NBA records ===
Statistic	Wins	Losses	Win%
Minneapolis Lakers regular season record (1948–1960)	457	382	.545
Los Angeles Lakers regular season record (1960–present)	3,196	2,133	.600
All-time regular season record (1948–present)	3,653	2,515	.592
Minneapolis Lakers post-season record (1948–1960)	67	40	.626
Los Angeles Lakers post-season record (1960–present)	403	287	.584
All-time post-season record (1948–present)	470	327	.590
All-time regular and postseason record	4,113	2,842	.591

=== NBL records ===
Statistic	Wins	Losses	Win%
Minneapolis Lakers regular season record (1947–1948)	43	17	.717
Minneapolis Lakers postseason record (1947–1948)	8	2	.800
All-time regular and postseason record	51	19	.729
