= List of Los Angeles Lakers head coaches =

The Los Angeles Lakers are an American professional basketball team based in Los Angeles, California. formerly known as the Detroit Gems from 1947 to 1948 and the Minneapolis Lakers from 1948 to 1960. They play in the Pacific Division of the Western Conference in the National Basketball Association (NBA). The Lakers have played their home games at the Crypto.com Arena since 1999. The franchise took its official name from Minnesota's nickname, the Land of 10,000 Lakes. At the time the name was revealed, the Lakers were in Minneapolis. In their franchise history, the team has only missed the NBA playoffs 11 times. According to Forbes magazine, the Lakers are the second most valuable basketball franchise in the NBA, valued at approximately US$4.4 billion, surpassed only by the New York Knicks. The Lakers are majority-owned by Jerry Buss's family trust, while Rob Pelinka is the general manager.

The franchise has had 31 head coaches, including 29 since joining the NBA. The franchise's first head coach was Joel Mason, while its first coach in the NBA was John Kundla, who coached for 12 seasons with the Lakers in the NBL, BAA and NBA and winning 6 combined NBL/BAA/NBA championships. Phil Jackson is the franchise's all-time leader for the most regular-season games coached (902), most playoff games coached (181), most regular-season game wins (610), and most playoff wins (118). The Lakers have won 17 BAA/NBA championships; five with Kundla, five with Jackson, four with Riley, one with Bill Sharman, one with Paul Westhead, and one with Frank Vogel. With the Lakers, Sharman, Riley, and Del Harris have won the NBA Coach of the Year Award, in 1972, 1990, and 1995 respectively. Kundla, Sharman, Riley, and Jackson have been inducted into the Basketball Hall of Fame as a coach. George Mikan, Jim Pollard, Jerry West, Pat Riley, Magic Johnson, Kurt Rambis, Byron Scott, and Luke Walton have all played and coached for the Lakers.

== Key ==
GC	Games coached
W	Wins
L	Losses
Win%	Winning percentage
#	Number of coaches^{[a]}
*	Spent entire NBA head coaching career with the Lakers
†	Elected into the Basketball Hall of Fame as a coach
*†	Elected to the Basketball Hall of Fame as a coach and spent entire coaching career with the Lakers

== Coaches ==
Note: Statistics are correct through the 2024–25 season.

=== NBL ===
#	Name	Term^{[b]}	GC	W	L	Win%	GC	W	L	Win%	Achievements	Reference
#	Name	Term^{[b]}	Regular season				Playoffs				Achievements	Reference
Detroit Gems
1	Joel Mason	1946–1947	16	3	13	.188	—	—	—	—		
2	Fred Campbell	1947	28	1	27	.004	—	—	—	—		
Minneapolis Lakers
3	John Kundla*†	1947–1948	60	43	17	.717	10	8	2	.800	1 Championship (1948); 1 WPBT championship (1948)	

=== BAA/NBA ===
#	Name	Term^{[b]}	GC	W	L	Win%	GC	W	L	Win%	Achievements	Reference
#	Name	Term^{[b]}	Regular season				Playoffs				Achievements	Reference
Minneapolis Lakers
1	John Kundla*†	1948–1957	653	390	263	.597	82	54	28	.659	5 Championships (1949, 1950, 1952, 1953, 1954); One of the top 10 coaches in NBA history	
2	George Mikan*	1957–1958	39	9	30	.231	—	—	—	—		
—	John Kundla*†	1958–1959	72	33	39	.458	13	6	7	.462	One of the top 10 coaches in NBA history	
3	John Castellani*	1959–1960	36	11	25	.306	—	—	—	—		
4	Jim Pollard	1960	39	14	25	.359	9	5	4	.556		
Los Angeles Lakers
5	Fred Schaus*	1960–1967	560	315	245	.563	71	33	38	.465		
6	Butch van Breda Kolff	1967–1969	164	107	57	.652	33	21	12	.636		
7	Joe Mullaney	1969–1971	164	94	70	.573	30	16	14	.533		
8	Bill Sharman†	1971–1976	410	246	164	.600	37	22	15	.595	1971–72 NBA Coach of the Year; 1 Championship (1972)	
9	Jerry West*	1976–1979	246	145	101	.589	22	8	14	.364		
10	Jack McKinney	1979	14	10	4	.714	—	—	—	—		
11	Paul Westhead	1979–1981	161	111	50	.689	19	13	6	.684	1 Championship (1980)	
12	Pat Riley	1981–1990	727	533	194	.733	149	102	47	.685	1989–90 NBA Coach of the Year; 4 Championships (1982, 1985, 1987, 1988); One of the top 10 coaches in NBA history	
13	Mike Dunleavy	1990–1992	164	101	63	.616	23	13	10	.565	McDonald's Open winner (1991)	
14	Randy Pfund*	1992–1994	146	66	80	.452	5	2	3	.400		
15	Bill Bertka*	1994	2	1	1	.500	—	—	—	—		
16	Magic Johnson*	1994	16	5	11	.313	—	—	—	—		
17	Del Harris	1994–1999	340	224	116	.659	36	17	19	.472	1994–95 NBA Coach of the Year	
—	Bill Bertka*	1999	1	1	0	1.000	—	—	—	—		
18	Kurt Rambis	1999	37	24	13	.649	8	3	5	.375		
19	Phil Jackson	1999–2004	410	287	123	.700	92	64	28	.696	3 Championships (2000, 2001, 2002); One of the top 10 coaches in NBA history	
20	Rudy Tomjanovich	2004–2005	43	24	19	.558	—	—	—	—		
21	Frank Hamblen	2005	39	10	29	.256	—	—	—	—		
—	Phil Jackson	2005–2011	492	323	169	.657	89	54	35	.607	2 Championships (2009, 2010); One of the top 10 coaches in NBA history	
22	Mike Brown	2011–2012	71	42	29	.591	12	5	7	.417		
23	Bernie Bickerstaff	2012	5	4	1	.800	—	—	—	—		
24	Mike D'Antoni	2012–2014	154	67	87	.435	4	0	4	.000		
25	Byron Scott	2014–2016	164	38	126	.227	—	—	—	—		
26	Luke Walton	2016–2019	246	98	148	.398	—	—	—	—		
27	Frank Vogel	2019–2022	225	127	98	.564	27	18	9	.667	1 Championship (2020)	
28	Darvin Ham	2022–2024	164	90	74	.549	16	9	12	.429	1 NBA Cup (2023)	
29	JJ Redick	2024–present	164	103	61	.628	15	5	10	.250		

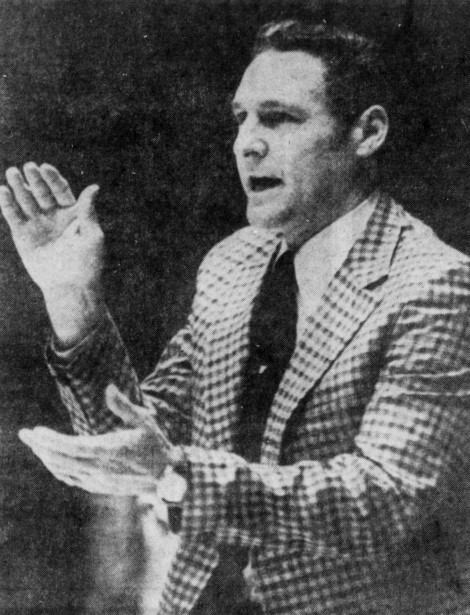
Former head coach Bill Sharman led the team to the NBA Championship in 1972.

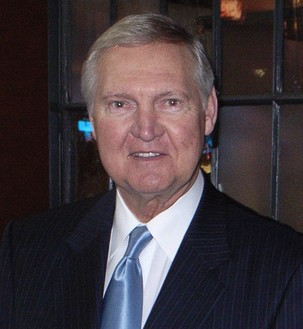
Jerry West was head coach of the Lakers for three seasons.

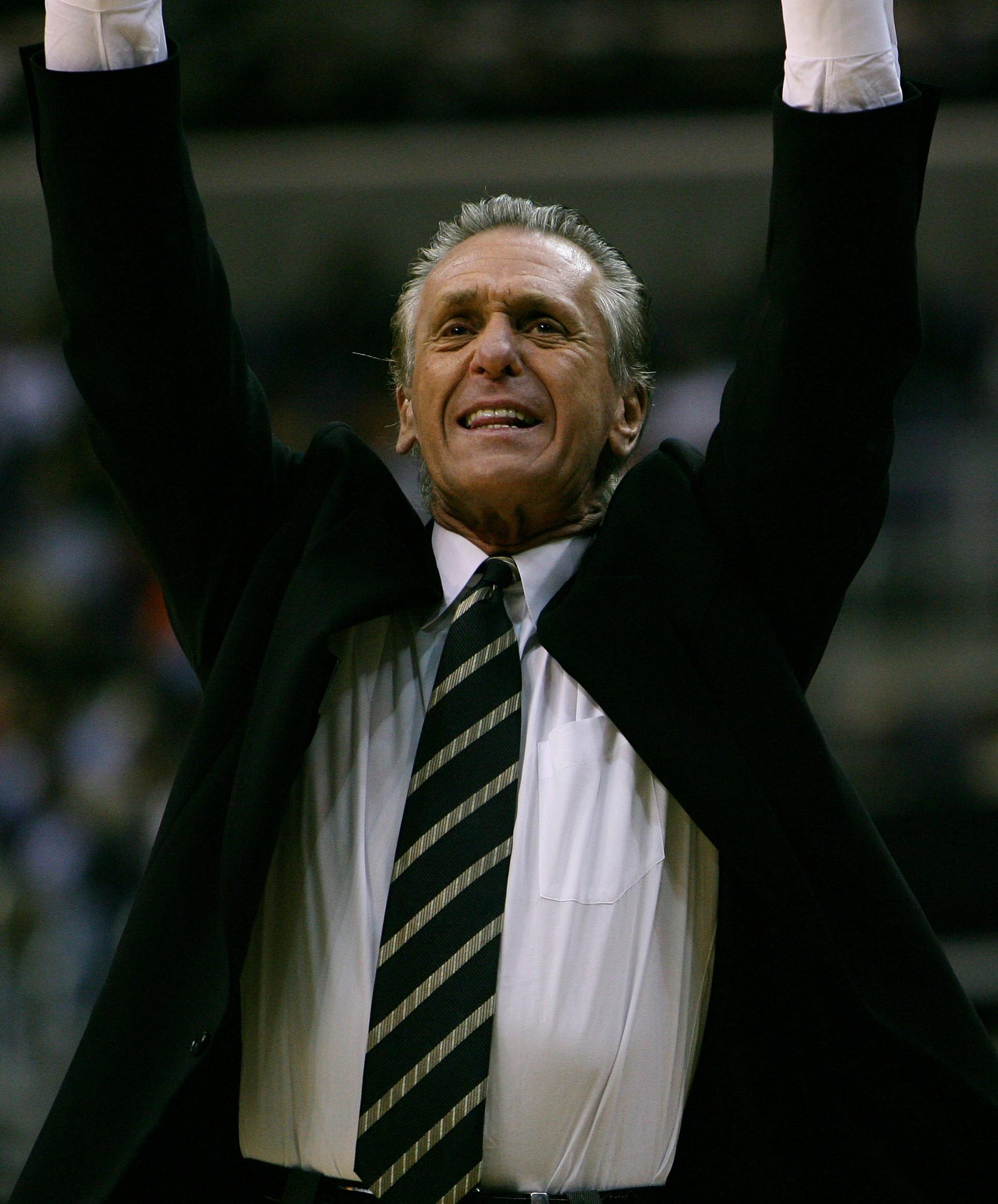
Pat Riley coached the team to four championships in the 1980s.

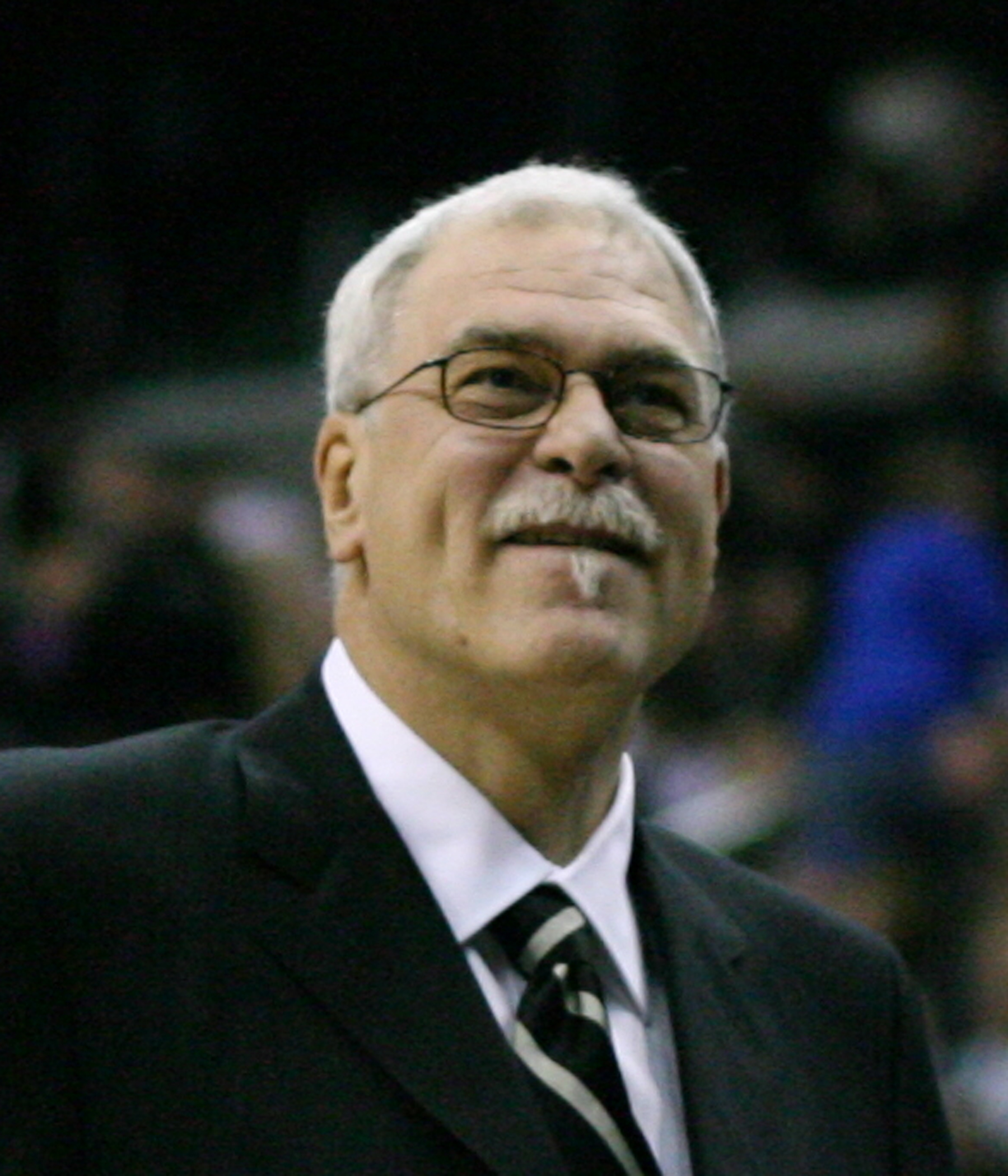
Phil Jackson won five championships in two stints coached with the Lakers.

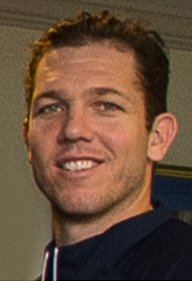
Former head coach Luke Walton.

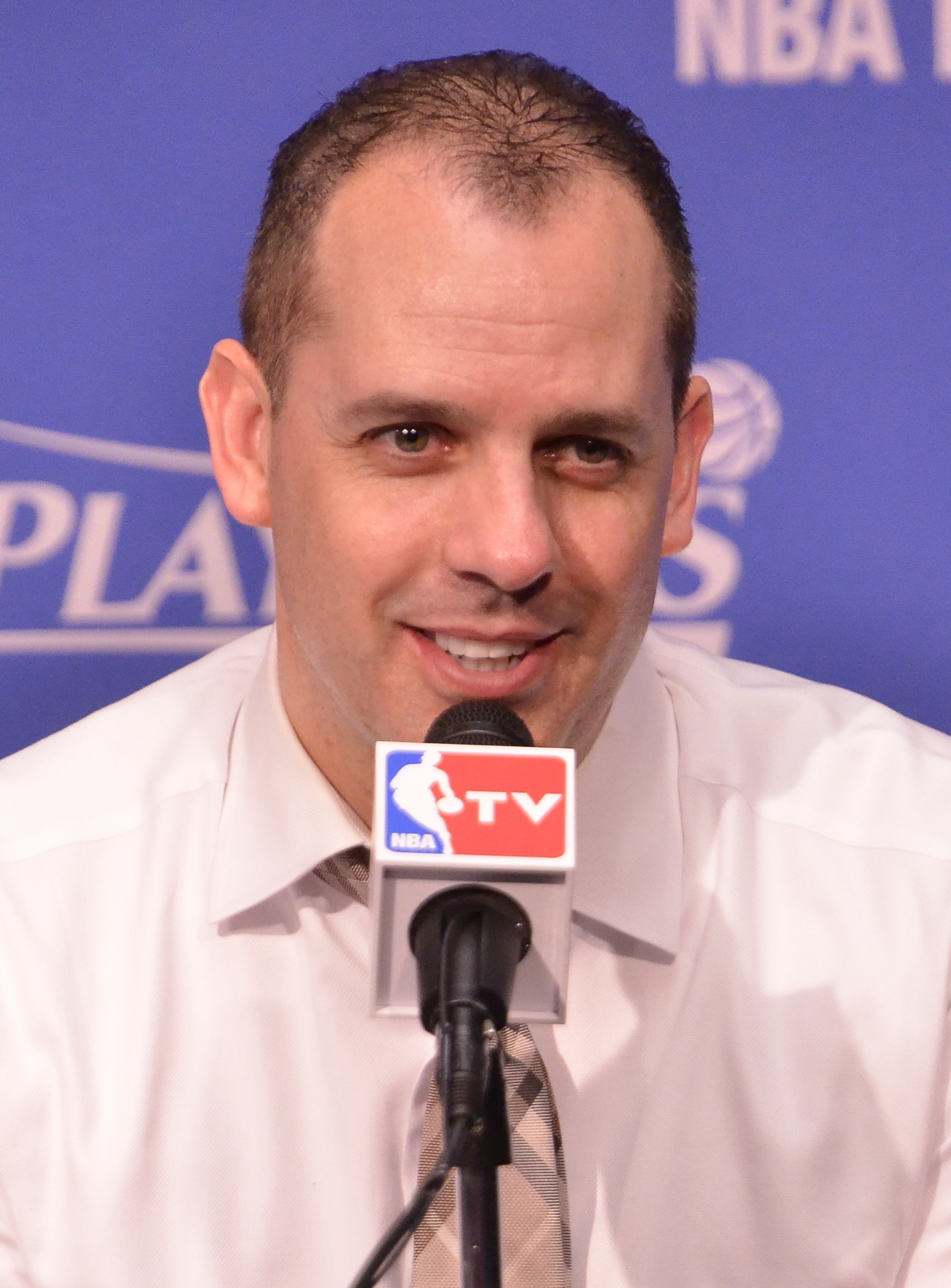
Frank Vogel coached the team to an NBA Championship in 2020

== Notes ==
- ^{a} A running total of the number of coaches of the Lakers. Thus, any coach who has two or more separate terms as head coach is only counted once.
- ^{b} Each year is linked to an article about that particular NBA season.
