= Tom Meyer (basketball) =

American basketball player (1922–2019)

Personal information
- Born: November 6, 1922 Highland Park, Michigan, U.S.
- Died: March 12, 2019 (aged 96) Vero Beach, Florida, U.S.
- Listed height: 6 ft 4 in (1.93 m)
- Listed weight: 214 lb (97 kg)

Career information
- High school: Fordson (Dearborn, Michigan)
- Position: Power forward / center

Career history
- 1946–1947: Detroit Gems
- 1947–1948: St. Joseph Outlaws
- 1948: Detroit Vagabonds

Henry Thomas Meyer (November 6, 1922 – March 12, 2019) was an American professional basketball player. He played in the National Basketball League for the Detroit Gems during the 1946–47 season and averaged 7.8 points per game.
