= Herb Scheffler =

American basketball player

Personal information
- Born: November 5, 1917 Springfield, Illinois, U.S.
- Died: January 20, 2001 (aged 83) Springfield, Illinois, U.S.
- Listed height: 6 ft 4 in (1.93 m)
- Listed weight: 220 lb (100 kg)

Career information
- High school: Springfield (Springfield, Illinois)
- College: Illinois (1936–1937); Oklahoma (1938–1940)
- Playing career: 1940–1947
- Position: Power forward / center
- Coaching career: 1949–1955

Career history

Playing
- 1940–1941: Scheffler Illinois All-Stars
- 1940–1941: Decatur Schnozzle Five
- 1946–1947: Detroit Gems

Coaching
- 1949–1955: Springfield HS

Herbert Gene Scheffler (November 5, 1917 – January 20, 2001) was an American professional basketball player. He played in the National Basketball League for the Detroit Gems in 1946–47. In 33 career games he averaged 3.8 points per contest.

Scheffler also played minor league baseball in 1940 for the Rocky Mount Red Sox in the Piedmont League. His manager was Hall of Famer Heinie Manush.
