= Curt Henderson =

American basketball player

Personal information
- Born: January 27, 1917 Watson, Illinois, U.S.
- Died: June 10, 2006 (aged 89) Watson, Illinois, U.S.
- Listed height: 5 ft 8 in (1.73 m)
- Listed weight: 150 lb (68 kg)
- Position: Guard

Career history
- 194?–194?: Ford Motor
- 194?–194?: Willys Overland
- 1946–1947: Keller's Oilers
- 1947: Detroit Gems

Albert Curtis Henderson (January 27, 1917 – June 10, 2006) was an American professional basketball player. He played in the National Basketball League for the Detroit Gems in the 1946–47 and averaged 1.0 points per game.
