= Eddie Parry =

American basketball player

Personal information
- Born: January 29, 1918 Detroit, Michigan, U.S.
- Died: February 23, 2016 (aged 98) Clay Township, Michigan, U.S.
- Listed height: 6 ft 1 in (1.85 m)
- Listed weight: 175 lb (79 kg)

Career information
- High school: Southeastern (Detroit, Michigan)
- Playing career: 1936–1948
- Position: Small forward / shooting guard

Career history
- 1936–1938: Jaglowicz
- 1938: Bower
- 1939–1941: Detroit Eagles
- 1941–1942: Saratoga
- 1942: Detroit Eagles
- 1944–1946: Detroit Mansfields
- 1946–1947: Detroit Gems
- 1947–1948: Springfield Squires

Edward William Parry Jr. (January 29, 1918 – February 23, 2016) was an American professional basketball player. He played in the National Basketball League for the Detroit Eagles and Detroit Gems. In three total NBL seasons, he averaged 5.6 points per game.
