= Vaughn Waddell =

Canadian-born American basketball player

Personal information
- Born: September 29, 1910 Forest, Ontario, Canada
- Died: March 7, 1980 (aged 69) Royal Oak, Michigan, U.S.
- Listed height: 6 ft 1 in (1.85 m)
- Listed weight: 190 lb (86 kg)
- Position: Guard

Career history
- 1934–1936: Detroit Hed-Aids
- 1936: Detroit
- 1936–1937: Detroit Altes Lager
- 1938–1940: Briggs
- 1940–1942: Detroit Auto Club
- 1942–1944: Selfridge Field
- 1945–1946: Detroit Mansfield
- 1946: Detroit Gems

Vaughn Reginald Waddell (September 29, 1910 – March 7, 1980) was an American professional basketball player. He played in the National Basketball League for the Detroit Gems for eight games early in the 1946–47 season. He averaged 3.1 points per contest.
