= Dave Latter =

American basketball player

Personal information
- Born: January 5, 1922 Leslie, Michigan, U.S.
- Died: October 28, 2000 (aged 78) Leslie, Michigan, U.S.
- Listed height: 6 ft 6 in (1.98 m)
- Listed weight: 210 lb (95 kg)

Career information
- High school: Leslie (Leslie, Michigan)
- Position: Center / forward

Career history
- 1946–1947: Detroit Gems
- 1947: St. Joseph Outlaws
- 1948: Detroit Vagabond Kings

David James Latter Jr. (January 5, 1922 – October 28, 2000) was an American professional basketball player. He played in the National Basketball League for the Detroit Gems and Detroit Vagabond Kings and averaged 7.6 points per game. He also played minor league baseball in the New York Yankees farm system. He previously played for a minor league team within the Detroit Tigers’ farm system before enlisting in the United States Army during World War II. He was wounded in action and was subsequently awarded the Purple Heart.
