= Pat Rooney (basketball) =

American basketball player

Personal information
- Born: 1925
- Listed height: 6 ft 3 in (1.91 m)

Career information
- High school: St. John's Prep (Queens, New York); Erasmus (Brooklyn, New York)
- Position: Shooting guard / small forward

Career history
- 1945–1946: Carbondale
- 1946: Detroit Gems
- 1946–1947: Tri-Cities Blackhawks
- 1948–1949: Montgomery Rebels

Paul J. "Pat" Rooney was an American professional basketball player. He played in the National Basketball League for the Detroit Gems and Tri-Cities Blackhawks. Due to the unique status of the first season of the Tri-Cities Blackhawks as a team, Rooney would be one of nine players from the team's inaugural season to only play for the Blackhawks during that same season as opposed to either also or only playing for the Buffalo Bisons precursor team from 1946 as well. In 10 career games he averaged 1.5 points per contest.
