= Frank Mekules =

American basketball and baseball player

Personal information
- Born: November 16, 1918 Detroit, Michigan, U.S.
- Died: September 5, 1958 (aged 39)
- Listed height: 6 ft 4 in (1.93 m)
- Listed weight: 218 lb (99 kg)

Career information
- High school: Western (Detroit, Michigan)
- College: Michigan State (1939–1941)
- Playing career: 1941–1951
- Position: Forward

Career history
- 1941–1942: Detroit Auto Club
- 1946: Detroit Gems
- 1946–1947: Smoke Brothers
- 1947–1951: House of David

Frank Anthony Mekules (November 16, 1918 – September 5, 1958) was an American professional basketball player and minor league baseball player. He played in the National Basketball League for the Detroit Gems for three games in the 1946–47 season and averaged 2.0 points per game. In baseball, he played for the Amarillo Gold Sox, Jackson Senators, and Pensacola Fliers.
