= Bob Dykstra =

American basketball player

Personal information
- Born: May 31, 1922 Oskaloosa, Iowa, U.S.
- Died: November 18, 1994 (aged 72) Rockford, Illinois, U.S.
- Listed height: 6 ft 9 in (2.06 m)
- Listed weight: 230 lb (104 kg)

Career information
- High school: Fernald (Fernald, Iowa)
- College: Simpson (1945–1946)
- Position: Center

Career history
- 1946: Detroit Gems
- 1946–1948: Sheboygan Red Skins
- 1950–1951: Racine Knights

Robert Dale Dykstra (May 31, 1922 – November 18, 1994) was a professional American basketball player. He played in the National Basketball League for the Detroit Gems early in the 1946–47 season before being sold to the Sheboygan Red Skins for the remainder of the season. Dykstra then played the 1947–48 year with Sheboygan as well, and for his NBL career he averaged 1.9 points per game.
