= Paul Juntunen =

American basketball player

Personal information
- Born: February 13, 1921 Sault Ste. Marie, Michigan, U.S.
- Died: October 16, 2004 (aged 83) Pensacola, Florida, U.S.
- Listed height: 6 ft 1 in (1.85 m)
- Listed weight: 180 lb (82 kg)

Career information
- College: Wayne State (1939–1942)
- Playing career: 1940–1948
- Position: Forward / guard

Career history
- 1940–1941: Winston
- 1945–1946: Detroit Mansfields
- 1946–1947: Detroit Gems
- 1948: Detroit Vagabond Kings

Paul Juntunen (also known as Paul Jayson; February 13, 1921 – October 16, 2004) was an American professional basketball player. He played in the National Basketball League for the Detroit Gems and Detroit Vagabond Kings and averaged 4.0 points per game. Later in his life, Paul changed his last name from Juntunen to Jayson.
