= Del Loranger =

American basketball player and coach

Personal information
- Born: March 17, 1920 Detroit, Michigan, U.S.
- Died: March 24, 2003 (aged 83) St. Clair, Michigan, U.S.
- Listed height: 6 ft 3 in (1.91 m)
- Listed weight: 175 lb (79 kg)

Career information
- High school: Fordson (Dearborn, Michigan)
- College: Western Michigan (1939–1943)
- Playing career: 1944–1949
- Position: Forward / guard

Career history
- 1944–1945: Midland Dow Chemical
- 1945: Detrtoit Mansfields
- 1946–1947: Detroit Gems
- 1947: Kansas City Blues
- 1947: Indianapolis Kautskys
- 1947–1948: Detroit Vagabond Kings
- 1948–1949: Detroit Jerry Lynch All-Stars

Delbert Loranger (March 17, 1920 – March 24, 2003) was an American professional basketball player and coach.

== Career ==
Loranger played in numerous independent and professional leagues, including the National Basketball League for the Detroit Gems, Indianapolis Kautskys, and Detroit Vagabond Kings. As a player, he averaged 6.8 points per game while in the NBL. Loranger also served as the Vagabond Kings' head coach during the 1948–49 season.
