= Charles Perry (basketball) =

American basketball player (1921–2001)

Personal information
- Born: April 6, 1921 Savannah, Georgia, U.S.
- Died: July 21, 2001 (aged 80) Tampa, Florida, U.S.
- Listed height: 6 ft 5 in (1.96 m)
- Listed weight: 215 lb (98 kg)

Career information
- High school: Beach (Savannah, Georgia)
- College: Tuskegee (1938–1942)
- Position: Guard

Career history
- 1946: Detroit Gems

Career highlights
- 2× Black college All-American (1941, 1942); 4× All-conference (1939–1942); Black college national champion

Charles Samuel Perry (April 6, 1921 – July 21, 2001) was an American professional basketball player. He played in the National Basketball League for the Detroit Gems. In five games he averaged 3.0 points per contest.

Perry was also an All-American receiver at left end for the Tuskegee Golden Tigers football team in 1942.
