= Frank Sabo =

American basketball player (1922–1982)

Personal information
- Born: April 10, 1922 Detroit, Michigan, U.S.
- Died: August 6, 1982 (aged 60) Dearborn, Michigan, U.S.
- Listed height: 6 ft 1 in (1.85 m)
- Listed weight: 190 lb (86 kg)

Career information
- High school: Southwestern (Detroit, Michigan)
- College: Wayne State (1941–1942)
- Position: Guard

Career history
- 1941–1942: West Side
- 1946: Detroit Gems
- 1946–1947: Smoke Brothers

Frank Michael Sabo (April 10, 1922 – August 6, 1982) was an American professional basketball player. He played in the National Basketball League for the Detroit Gems. In only three career games he averaged 5.3 points per contest.

Sabo joined the United States Marine Corps in 1942.
