= Joel Mason =

American football player and coach (1912–1995)

Profile
- Position: End

Personal information
- Born: March 12, 1912; Iron River, Michigan, U.S.
- Died: October 31, 1995 (aged 83); Harper Woods, Michigan, U.S.
- Listed height: 6 ft 0 in (1.83 m)
- Listed weight: 199 lb (90 kg)

Career information
- College: Western Michigan

Career history
- Chicago Cardinals (1939); Green Bay Packers (1942–1945); As assistant coach: Wayne State (1946–1948)

Awards and highlights
- NFL champion (1944)

Career statistics
- Receptions: 34
- Receiving yards: 390
- Touchdowns: 2
- Stats at Pro Football Reference

Joel Gregory Mason (March 12, 1912 – October 31, 1995) was an American multi-sport athlete who played both in the National Football League (NFL) as well as the National Basketball League (NBL).

== Professional football and basketball careers ==
Mason played with the Chicago Cardinals during the 1939 NFL season. After two seasons away from the NFL, he would play four seasons with the Green Bay Packers. During his time with them he was a member of the 1944 NFL Champion Packers. Mason also appeared in one game for the Sheboygan Red Skins in the National Basketball League during the 1942–43 season. He failed to register a statistic in his lone appearance.

He played at the collegiate level at Western Michigan University.

== Coaching career ==
After retiring from professional football, Mason became an assistant football coach at Wayne State University, and soon after became Wayne State's head basketball coach. Mason coached basketball for 18 years, from 1948 to 1966, winning 186 games and making one NCAA tournament appearance, in 1956. Mason also coached the NBL's Detroit Gems during the first half of the 1946–47 season, with the Gems later becoming the Minneapolis Lakers, now Los Angeles Lakers. He resigned, and player Fred Campbell took over to become player-coach. He was also an assistant football coach at Detroit Holy Redeemer High School during the 1967 and 1968 seasons.

== Head coaching record ==
Record table
Season	Team	Overall	Conference	Standing	Postseason
Wayne State Warriors (Independent) (1948–1955)
1948–49	Wayne State	11–13			
1949–50	Wayne State	7–15			
1950–51	Wayne State	12–11			
1951–52	Wayne State	19–6			
1952–53	Wayne State	14–6			
1953–54	Wayne State	16–6			
1954–55	Wayne State	9–14			
Wayne State Warriors (Presidents' Athletic Conference) (1955–1966)
1955–56	Wayne State	18–3	6–0	1st	NCAA Regional Fourth Place
1956–57	Wayne State	14–4	5–1	1st	
1957–58	Wayne State	7–11	2–4	3rd	
1958–59	Wayne State	4–14	2–8	6th	
1959–60	Wayne State	13–5	7–3	2nd	
1960–61	Wayne State	7–11	5–5	5th	
1961–62	Wayne State	9–9	7–3	2nd	
1962–63	Wayne State	1–16	1–9	8th	
1963–64	Wayne State	8–10	5–7	5th	
1964–65	Wayne State	11–7	9–3	1st	
1965–66	Wayne State	6–12	4–8	6th	
Wayne State:		186–173 (.518)	53–51 (.510)		
Total:		186–173 (.518)			
National champion Postseason invitational champion Conference regular season champion Conference regular season and conference tournament champion Division regular season champion Division regular season and conference tournament champion Conference tournament champion
