= Detroit Gems =

- Division: Western Division
- Leagues: National Basketball League
- Founded: 1946
- History: Detroit Gems; 1946–1947 (NBL); Minneapolis Lakers; 1947–1948 (NBL); 1948–1960 (NBA); Los Angeles Lakers; 1960–present
- Arena: Dearborn Forum (Planned)
- Location: Detroit, Michigan
- Team colors: Blue, white, red
- Ownership: C. King Boring (founder); Maurice Winston (financial partner)

The Detroit Gems were an American professional basketball team based in Detroit, Michigan. Supposedly, the Detroit Gems had played some sort of team-based basketball at a competitive level earlier on either as an independent team or as a more local, competitive team within the state of Michigan before joining the National Basketball League. The team played only one season, the 1946–47 season, in the Western Division of the National Basketball League, which eventually became a predecessor organization to the National Basketball Association. Following the season, the franchise was sold and moved to Minneapolis to become the Minneapolis Lakers. In 1960, they relocated again, this time to Los Angeles, and became the Los Angeles Lakers.

== History ==
1946–47 Detroit Gems season
- Head coach: Joel Mason (3–13); Fred Campbell (1–27)
- Arena: Holy Redeemer High School Gymnasium; Lincoln High School Gymnasium; Detroit Olympia (doubleheaders only)

Results
- Record: 4–40 (.091)
- Place: Division: 6th (Western)
- Stats at Basketball Reference

The Gems were founded by C. King Boring (originally as a barnstorming team) and mostly made up of local players and coached by Joel Mason. The only season of the Gems under that name was also the NBL's first official season where they actually implemented a drafting system similar to what the future rivaling Basketball Association of America (and later merging partner to become the National Basketball Association) had for the eventual NBA draft system a year later following the conclusion of their inaugural league season for the purpose of controlled player salaries and limiting the idea of outbidding other players outside of their own 12-player teams at hand (with the NBL having a budget of $6,000 this season), as well as implementing key players to signing binding contracts as soon as they could and the NBL looking to have full-time referees on display. They started their season with an exhibition game against the Oshkosh All-Stars, which ended with a 54–69 loss. They later started their 44-game regular season schedule on November 11 in Anderson, Indiana, with a 52–64 loss against the Anderson Duffey Packers. The Gems were owned by C. King Boring and local jeweler Maurice Winston (who partially financed the team - thus naming it "Gems"), planned to build a "sports palace" in Dearborn, which was mooted to hold 7,000–10,000 people. But the Dearborn Forum was never built; instead, they played their home games at various locations, including the Holy Redeemer High School Gymnasium in Detroit and Lincoln High School Gym in Ferndale. They also played a few doubleheaders with the Basketball Association of America's Detroit Falcons at the Detroit Olympia, and even transferred some home games out into Flint, Michigan. Attendance for their games was slim, with an estimated average being about 300 per game.

For their only season of existence in the NBL, the Gems won only four out of 44 games (excluding exhibition games on January 27, 1947 with a 59–48 win against the Midland Dow Chemicals and unknown dated games against the Dayton Metropolitans and the Utica Utes, the Gems won all of their NBL scheduled games at home with a 61–54 victory on November 26, 1946 against the Syracuse Nationals; a close 57–54 victory on December 3, 1946 against the Youngstown Bears; a 60–56 victory on December 16, 1947 against the eventual champion Chicago American Gears (minus star center George Mikan); and a close 56–55 win on January 16, 1947 against the Indianapolis Kautskys (a controversially confusing 74–73 overtime win on December 25, 1946 against the Youngstown Bears was also originally tabbed as a victory for the Gems at first, but it ultimately was overturned on January 6, 1947 by NBL commissioner Ward "Piggy" Lambert and led to Youngstown being rewarded another victory to their season with a 74–75 defeat for Detroit instead)) – ending that season with a woeful 23-game losing streak – and finishing last in the league; ownership claimed the poor crowds had cost them some $30,000. If the Gems' only season of play were to count as a part of the Lakers franchise's history, this season would be marked as not just the worst season of all time, but also worse than the most dubious failed seasons ever recorded in NBA history. Not only that, but the Gems' record would be considered the worst record in NBL history in terms of teams that completed their seasons properly (some teams would either fold operations entirely or otherwise leave the NBL during a season of play with another team taking on said team's place at various points throughout their 12-year history). Despite this, NBL commissioner Ward "Piggy" Lambert announced in May that the Gems would return for another season; however, the franchise was put up for sale and purchased for US$15,000 by Ben Berger and Morris Chalfen. The new owners relocated the franchise to Minneapolis and renamed it the Minneapolis Lakers, effectively hard rebooting the franchise. Many years afterwards, it was reported by Boring's granddaughter that C. King Boring later lamented that he did not maintain a minority ownership interest in the team that now became the Lakers for himself.

== Draft picks ==
Entering this season, the National Basketball League would utilize their own draft system that would be considered similar to what the NFL has done for the NFL draft. As such, the 1946 NBL draft would be considered the first ever professional basketball draft ever done, even before the 1947 BAA draft that was done by the soon to be rivaling Basketball Association of America. Because of that fact, the Detroit Gems would participate in the inaugural 1946 NBL draft, which had occurred sometime during the 1946–47 season's offseason period before that season officially began for the NBL. However, as of 2026, no records of what the Gems' draft picks might have been for the NBL have properly come up, with any information on who those selections might have been for Detroit (especially since the Detroit Gems franchise would be considered an expansion franchise for the NBL this season) likely being lost to time in the process.

== Roster ==
1946–47 Detroit Gems roster
Players

Pos.	No.	Player	Height	Weight	DOB	From
F/C		Dave Latter	6 ft 6 in (1.98 m)	220 lb (100 kg)	1922-01-05	Leslie HS (MI)
C		Bob Dykstra	6 ft 9 in (2.06 m)	230 lb (104 kg)	1922-05-31	Simpson College
G		Fred Campbell	5 ft 11 in (1.80 m)	175 lb (79 kg)	1920-08-08	Southern Illinois
F		Walt Czarnecki	6 ft 5 in (1.96 m)	215 lb (98 kg)	1916-04-27	Detroit
G/F		Chuck Hawley	6 ft 3 in (1.91 m)	195 lb (88 kg)	1915-04-03	Odin HS (IL)
G		Curt Henderson	5 ft 8 in (1.73 m)	150 lb (68 kg)	1917-01-27	Sparks Business College (IL)
G/F		Paul Juntunen	6 ft 1 in (1.85 m)	180 lb (82 kg)	1921-02-13	Wayne State
G		Wilbert King	5 ft 7 in (1.70 m)	155 lb (70 kg)	1915-02-16	Pershing HS (MI)
G/F		Del Loranger	6 ft 3 in (1.91 m)	175 lb (79 kg)	1920-03-17	Western Michigan
G/F		Howie McCarty	6 ft 2 in (1.88 m)	190 lb (86 kg)	1919-04-15	Wayne State
F		Frank Mekules	6 ft 4 in (1.93 m)	218 lb (99 kg)	1918-11-16	Michigan State
F/C		Tom Meyer	6 ft 4 in (1.93 m)	214 lb (97 kg)	1922-11-06	Fordson HS (MI)
F		Connie O'Connor	6 ft 1 in (1.85 m)	190 lb (86 kg)	1923-02-21	South Dakota
G/F		Eddie Parry	6 ft 1 in (1.85 m)	175 lb (79 kg)	1918-01-29	Southeastern HS (MI)
G		Charles Perry	6 ft 5 in (1.96 m)	215 lb (98 kg)	1921-04-06	Tuskegee
G/F		Pat Rooney	6 ft 3 in (1.91 m)	190 lb (86 kg)	1925	Erasmus Hall HS (NY)
G		Frank Sabo	6 ft 1 in (1.85 m)	190 lb (86 kg)	1922-04-10	Wayne State
F/C		Herb Scheffler	6 ft 4 in (1.93 m)	220 lb (100 kg)	1917-11-05	Oklahoma
G		Vaughn Waddell	6 ft 1 in (1.85 m)	190 lb (86 kg)	1910-09-29	Manhattan

Coaches
Head coach

Joel Mason
Fred Campbell

Legend
- (DP) Unsigned draft pick
- (FA) Free agent
- (S) Suspended
- Injured

== National Basketball League ==
=== Detroit Gems NBL Schedule ===
Not to be confused with exhibition or other non-NBL scheduled games that did not count towards Detroit's official NBL record for this season. An official database created by John Grasso detailing every NBL match possible (outside of two matches that the Kankakee Gallagher Trojans won over the Dayton Metropolitans in 1938) would be released in 2026 showcasing every team's official schedules throughout their time spent in the NBL. As such, these are the official results recorded for the Detroit Gems during their first season in the NBL (and only season when they used the Detroit Gems name as a franchise altogether).

#	Date	Opponent	Score	Record
1	November 11	@ Anderson	52–64	0–1
2	November 12	Toledo	40–46	0–2
3	November 19	Fort Wayne	44–60	0–3
4	November 22	@ Youngstown	54–62	0–4
5	November 23	@ Buffalo	35–45	0–5
6	November 26	Syracuse	61–54	1–5
7	November 30	@ Oshkosh	53–63	1–6
8	December 1	@ Fort Wayne	52–64	1–7
9	December 3	Youngstown	57–54	2–7
10	December 8	@ Sheboygan	37–50	2–8
11	December 10	Rochester	54–65	2–9
12	December 12	@ Syracuse	40–60	2–10
13	December 15	@ Chicago	43–58	2–11
14	December 17	@ Indianapolis	37–50	2–12
15	December 18	Chicago	60–56	3–12
16	December 25	Youngstown	74–75 (OT) [74–73 (OT)†]	3–13 [4–12†]
17	January 4	@ Rochester	54–72	3–14 [4–13†]
—	January 6	@ Buffalo	Cancelled	
18	January 9	Tri-Cities	42–57	3–15
19	January 13	@ Toledo	51–69	3–16
20	January 15	@ Tri-Cities	39–47	3–17
21	January 16	Indianapolis	56–55	4–17
22	January 19	Sheboygan	39–47	4–18
23	January 25	@ Oshkosh	55–69	4–19
24	January 27	N Oshkosh	58–71	4–20
25	January 29	N Toledo	36–50	4–21
26	January 30	@ Toledo	51–73	4–22
27	February 3	@ Youngstown	52–62	4–23
28	February 4	@ Syracuse	55–84	4–24
29	February 5	Anderson	38–44	4–25
30	February 6	Rochester	53–71	4–26
31	February 7	@ Chicago	44–76	4–27
32	February 9	@ Sheboygan	52–59	4–28
33	February 11	Chicago	53–58	4–29
34	February 15	@ Rochester	56–93	4–30
35	February 16	Indianapolis	42–52	4–31
36	February 20	N Fort Wayne	36–59	4–32
37	February 23	@ Fort Wayne	50–75	4–33
38	February 24	N Anderson	57–85	4–34
39	February 25	@ Indianapolis	41–83	4–35
40	February 26	Tri-Cities	43–51	4–36
41	March 5	N Oshkosh	49–70	4–37
42	March 7	N Sheboygan	42–57	4–38
43	March 10	@ Anderson	51–72	4–39
44	March 11	Syracuse	50–68	4–40

† – Game was originally recorded as a 74–73 overtime victory for Detroit, but a faulty time clock in the overtime period near the end of the game when Youngstown looked to make an extra, final shot in their game caused the Bears to protest the initial results to NBL Commissioner Ward Lambert. While the game was still recorded as a Gems victory for at least one more scheduled NBL game the Gems played in, the results of the December 25, 1946 game ended with the commissioner accepting Youngstown's grievances and led to the Gems getting a 75–74 overtime defeat that day instead.

=== Western Division standings ===
Pos.	Western Division	Wins	Losses	Win %
1	Oshkosh All-Stars	28	16	.636
2	Indianapolis Kautskys	27	17	.614
T–3	Chicago American Gears	26	18	.591
T–3	Sheboygan Red Skins	26	18	.591
5	Anderson Duffey Packers	24	20	.545
6	Detroit Gems	4	40	.091
