= Fred Campbell (basketball) =

American basketball player and coach

Personal information
- Born: August 8, 1920 Illinois, U.S.
- Died: December 3, 2008 (aged 88) Austin, Texas, U.S.
- Listed height: 5 ft 11 in (1.80 m)
- Listed weight: 175 lb (79 kg)

Career information
- High school: Herrin (Herrin, Illinois)
- College: Southern Illinois (1940–1942)
- Playing career: 1946–1954
- Position: Guard
- Coaching career: 1947–1954

Career history

Playing
- 1946–1947: Detroit Gems
- 1947–1949: Detroit Vagabond Kings
- 1949–1950: Detroit Mansfield
- 1949–1954: Detroit Vagabond Kings

Coaching
- 1947: Detroit Gems (interim HC)
- 1947–1948, 1949–1954: Detroit Vagabond Kings

Fred Gaines Campbell (August 8, 1920 – December 3, 2008) was an American professional basketball player and coach as well as minor league baseball player. He played in the National Basketball League for the Detroit Gems and Detroit Vagabond Kings. While playing for the Gems he served as the head coach during the second half of the season after coach Joel Mason resigned. In many seasons with the Vagabond Kings, except for the only one in which the franchise played in the NBL (the rest of the years they were independent), Campbell also served as a player-coach. In two seasons as an NBL player, Campbell averaged 5.8 points per game.

In baseball, he played for a number of minor league teams in New York and Texas.
