= 1948–49 Oshkosh All-Stars season =

NBL professional basketball team season

- Division champions
- Head coach: Lon Darling (8–4); Gene Englund & Eddie Riska (interim player-coaches; 18–16); Gene Englund & Glen Selbo (interim player-coaches; 11–7 + Playoffs)
- General manager: Lon Darling
- Owner: Lon Darling
- Arena: South Park School Gymnasium

Results
- Record: 37–27 (.578)
- Place: Division: 1st (Western)
- Playoff finish: Lost to Anderson Duffey Packers in NBL Championship, 3–0

The 1948–49 Oshkosh All-Stars season was the All-Stars' twelfth and final year in the United States' National Basketball League (NBL), which was also the twelfth and final year the league existed. However, if one were to include the independent seasons they played starting all the way back in 1929 before beginning their NBL tenure in 1937, this would officially be their nineteenth (and final (major)) season of play instead. Following Oshkosh's failure to defect alongside the Toledo Jeeps (who folded operations by the start of this season) from the NBL to the rivaling Basketball Association of America after the Fort Wayne Zollner Pistons, Indianapolis Kautskys, the most recent NBL champion Minneapolis Lakers, and runner-up Rochester Royals successfully switched leagues themselves, the final NBL season would see nine total teams playing in the league (with one team folding operations during its season and having another team immediately take over its spot and position soon afterward), with four (though it could technically been seen as five) teams playing in the Eastern Division and five teams (including Oshkosh) playing in the Western Division. The All-Stars played their home games at the South Park School Gymnasium in the South Park Middle School within the Oshkosh Area School District, which would end up proving to be their greatest detriment by this point in their history, as noted by how many neutral-hosted games they would play while in the state of Wisconsin during this season, never mind other areas held within this season.

Despite Oshkosh losing two longtime All-Stars in Bob Carpenter (albeit briefly) and Clint Wager to the newly created Hammond Calumet Buccaneers due to an apparent effort of wanting controlled salaries and longtime All-Star Leroy Edwards being limited to only 10 regular season games this season before later retiring from professional basketball altogether by the end of this season, Oshkosh would end up managing just fine this season due to the additions of rookie Gene Berce, Alex Hannum, Jack Burmaster, and Bob Mulvihill alongside most of their starting line-up from the previous season. Gene Englund in particular would be the key component from last season to step up for the All-Stars this season, as he would help lead the team to a better overall record this season when compared to their previous season, as noted by him being the only Oshkosh player to be given an honor with him being named a member of the final All-NBL First-Team ever announced. For the seventh and final time in the NBL's history, the All-Stars finished their season with either a division or league-best record (37–27), thanks in part due to the Tri-Cities Blackhawks not having enough steam to catch up with Oshkosh and the All-Stars' cityside rivals in the Sheboygan Red Skins splitting their day-night doubleheader matches against the Dayton Rens held on March 31, 1949. The 37–27 record Oshkosh had that season would later help them get what would essentially be a first round bye in the final playoffs the NBL ever held. Despite the success that the All-Stars had under Lon Darling as a head coach, however, he would end up stepping down as the team's head coach early on in the season by the end of November after losing five games in a row (three of which were official NBL matches) after playing only twelve games in their regular season period, which led to both Gene Englund and Eddie Riska taking over as co-player-coaches for the rest of the season going forward, though Eddie Riska would be waived by the team on February 9 and have his spots be replaced by Walt Lautenbach as a new (returning) player and Glen Selbo as a co-interim player-coach respectively for the rest of the season there. They then beat the Tri-Cities Blackhawks 3–1 before they went to their league record sixth and final NBL championship series match-up, with them taking on the Eastern Division champion Anderson Duffey Packers in the process before being swept by them 3–0 in a best-of-five series in what later became not just the final NBL games ever played, but also the final professional games the Oshkosh All-Stars franchise would ever play as well. Fittingly, Leroy Edwards, one of only two players to play throughout the entire NBL's existence (as well as the only NBL player to stay on one team for all twelve seasons), even if you include the years under the Midwest Basketball Conference name (the other being his former teammate, Charley Shipp), would end up playing in the final NBL championship game ever held.

Originally, on August 3, 1949, the Oshkosh All-Stars were considered to join the likes of the final NBL champions in the Anderson Duffey Packers (though they had to rebrand themselves to just the Anderson Packers in the near future), the original Denver Nuggets, their cityside rivals in the Sheboygan Red Skins, the Syracuse Nationals, the Tri-Cities Blackhawks, and the newly created Waterloo Hawks alongside the planned Indianapolis Olympians NBL expansion team as one of nine NBL teams to move from the NBL to the NBA in what was considered a merger with the newer created Basketball Association of America (who themselves had nine of their teams survive that merger, including three of the four NBL turned BAA teams for the 1948–49 season) to become the present-day National Basketball Association, though the All-Stars were required to move out of Oshkosh, Wisconsin and likely play in Milwaukee (with Green Bay being suggested as an alternative location for them to move to, alongside a potential plan of merging operations with an independent team called the Milwaukee Shooting Stars as well) instead for a planned even 18 teams for the 1949–50 NBA season. However, the ownership group of the All-Stars ended up having second thoughts on trying to move their operations out to a different part of Wisconsin and ultimately decided to opt out of joining the NBA altogether by either September or early October 1949 (most likely by early September 1949), thus making them join the all-black Dayton Rens and the similarly smaller sized Hammond Calumet Buccaneers as the only NBL teams to not make it to the NBA by the official NBL-BAA merger date. While they did play for another season in the more minor league feeling Wisconsin State Basketball League and there were later talks regarding the Oshkosh All-Stars making a professional return in the National Professional Basketball League (which was created when four of the NBL's teams from the original merger were forced out by the NBA) not long afterward, questions about their playing location caused them to not make a return into the NPBL that following season once it actually existed. When Lon Darling later passed away on April 19, 1951, due to a heart attack, it officially marked the end of the Oshkosh All-Stars franchise after either one or two dormant-feeling independent season(s) following the NBL's conclusion. There is a feeling among local Wisconsinites and Oshkoshians that had the Oshkosh All-Stars been allowed to remain as an NBA team instead of aborting their NBA plans entirely before they even began, they could have continued to compete in the league even in the present day similar to what the Green Bay Packers have done for the NFL.

== Draft picks ==
The Oshkosh All-Stars would participate in the 1948 NBL draft, which occurred right after the 1948 BAA draft when plans for a joint draft between the National Basketball League and the rivaling Basketball Association of America ultimately fell out when the defending NBL champion Minneapolis Lakers, Rochester Royals, Fort Wayne Zollner Pistons, and Indianapolis Kautskys turned Jets all defected from the NBL to the BAA. However, as of 2026, no records of what the All-Stars' draft picks might have been for the NBL have properly come up, with any information on who those selections might have been being lost to time in the process.

== Roster ==
1948–49 Oshkosh All-Stars roster
Players

Pos.	No.	Player	Height	Weight	DOB	From
G/F		Gene Berce	5 ft 11 in (1.80 m)	175 lb (79 kg)	1926–11–22	Marquette
G/F		Bill Brown	6 ft 3 in (1.91 m)	205 lb (93 kg)	1922–08–02	Maryland
G/F		Jack Burmaster	6 ft 3 in (1.91 m)	190 lb (86 kg)	1926–12–23	Illinois
F/C		Bob Carpenter	6 ft 5 in (1.96 m)	200 lb (91 kg)	1917–11–06	East Texas A&M
C		Ed Dancker	6 ft 7 in (2.01 m)	200 lb (91 kg)	1914–03–14	South Division HS (WI)
C		Leroy Edwards	6 ft 5 in (1.96 m)	210 lb (95 kg)	1914–04–11	Kentucky
F/C		Gene Englund	6 ft 5 in (1.96 m)	205 lb (93 kg)	1917–10–21	Wisconsin
F/C		Alex Hannum	6 ft 7 in (2.01 m)	210 lb (95 kg)	1923–07–19	USC
F		Marshall Hawkins	6 ft 3 in (1.91 m)	205 lb (93 kg)	1924–08–03	Tennessee
G/F		Walt Lautenbach	6 ft 2 in (1.88 m)	185 lb (84 kg)	1922–11–17	Wisconsin
C		Ed Mills	6 ft 8 in (2.03 m)	225 lb (102 kg)	1922–02–23	Wisconsin
G		Bob Mulvihill	6 ft 1 in (1.85 m)	185 lb (84 kg)	1924–03–09	Fordham
G/F		Eddie Riska	6 ft 0 in (1.83 m)	175 lb (79 kg)	1919–10–04	Notre Dame
G/F		Glen Selbo	6 ft 3 in (1.91 m)	196 lb (89 kg)	1926–03–29	Wisconsin
F/C		Floyd Volker	6 ft 4 in (1.93 m)	205 lb (93 kg)	1921–06–21	Wyoming

Coaches
Head coach
- Lon Darling (resigned)
- Gene Englund (co-player-coach)
- Eddie Riska (co-player-coach)
- Glen Selbo (co-player-coach)

Legend
- (DP) Unsigned draft pick
- (FA) Free agent
- (S) Suspended
- Injured

Roster

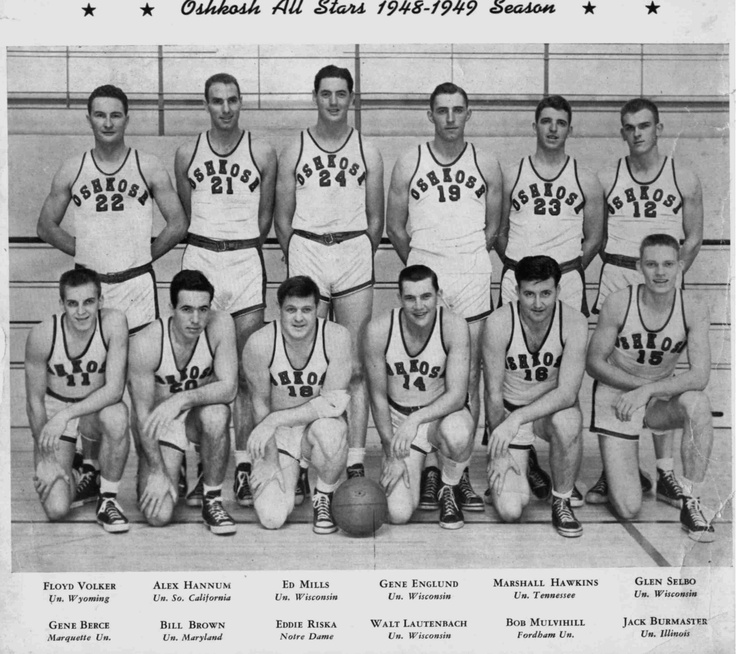
The final roster for the final NBL team the Oshkosh All-Stars ever had throughout their history.

Note: Bill Brown, Ed Dancker, Ed Mills, Eddie Riska, and Glen Selbo were not on the final playoff roster for this season.

== Regular season ==
=== Season standings ===
Pos.	Western Division	Wins	Losses	Win %
1	Oshkosh All-Stars	37	27	.578
2	Tri-Cities Blackhawks	36	28	.563
3	Sheboygan Red Skins	35	29	.547
4	Waterloo Hawks	30	32	.484
5	Denver Nuggets	18	44	.290

=== NBL Schedule ===
Not to be confused with exhibition or other non-NBL scheduled games that did not count towards Oshkosh's official NBL record for this season. An official database created by John Grasso detailing every NBL match possible (outside of two matches that the Kankakee Gallagher Trojans won over the Dayton Metropolitans in 1938) would be released in 2026 showcasing every team's official schedules throughout their time spent in the NBL. As such, these are the official results recorded for the Oshkosh All-Stars during their twelfth and final season in the NBL.

#	Date	Opponent	Score	Record
1	October 30	Detroit	72–59	1–0
2	November 3	N Detroit	75–37	2–0
3	November 4	N Detroit	63–59	3–0
4	November 6	Detroit	81–54	4–0
5	November 12	N Sheboygan	59–61	4–1
6	November 13	Anderson	51–44	5–1
7	November 15	@ Denver	60–50	6–1
8	November 17	@ Denver	56–46	7–1
9	November 20	Sheboygan	67–41	8–1
10	November 21	@ Waterloo	49–54	8–2
11	November 27	Syracuse	54–64	8–3
12	November 30	N Anderson	65–75	8–4
13	December 1	@ Hammond	72–46	9–4
14	December 4	@ Tri-Cities	57–47	10–4
15	December 5	@ Waterloo	36–41	10–5
16	December 6	N Waterloo	58–56	11–5
17	December 7	N Waterloo	64–49	12–5
18	December 11	Hammond	50–45	13–5
19	December 13	N Syracuse	55–68	13–6
20	December 16	@ Tri-Cities	64–73	13–7
21	December 18	Syracuse	60–55	14–7
22	December 19	@ Waterloo	46–47	14–8
23	December 21	Hammond	62–55	15–8
24	December 23	@ Anderson	63–79	15–9
25	December 26	@ Sheboygan	42–60	15–10
26	December 27	N Dayton	89–69	16–10
27	December 28	N Waterloo	71–65	17–10
28	January 3	@ Anderson	58–59	17–11
29	January 6	@ Syracuse	70–75	17–12
30	January 8	Hammond	51–48	18–12
31	January 9	@ Waterloo	39–62	18–13
32	January 12	@ Hammond	61–59	19–13
33	January 13	@ Syracuse	72–79	19–14
34	January 15	Denver	64–38	20–14
35	January 16	@ Sheboygan	63–67	20–15
36	January 19	N Dayton	55–67	20–16
37	January 20	Dayton	62–64	20–17
38	January 22	Tri-Cities	64–53	21–17
39	January 23	N Dayton	57–49	22–17
40	January 27	N Hammond	66–59	23–17
41	January 29	Sheboygan	68–63	24–17
42	January 30	@ Tri-Cities	69–92	24–18
43	February 2	@ Hammond	58–78	24–19
44	February 3	@ Sheboygan	73–61	25–19
45	February 5	Tri-Cities	63–65	25–20
46	February 8	@ Denver	60–50	26–20
47	February 10	@ Denver	61–59 (OT)	27–20
48	February 12	Waterloo	51–50	28–20
49	February 13	@ Tri-Cities	54–53	29–20
50	February 19	Anderson	52–55	29–21
51	February 20	@ Hammond	61–53	30–21
52	February 22	Syracuse	61–38	31–21
53	February 26	Tri-Cities	58–54	32–21
54	February 27	@ Sheboygan	64–70	32–22
55	March 1	N Anderson	65–71	32–23
56	March 3	@ Syracuse	55–67	32–24
57	March 5	Sheboygan	64–53	33–24
58	March 12	Anderson	67–74 (OT)	33–25
59	March 17	@ Syracuse	63–61	34–25
60	March 19	Denver	59–58	35–25
61	March 20	@ Tri-Cities	61–78	35–26
62	March 21	N Denver	61–47	36–26
63	March 26	Denver	63–54	37–26
64	March 29	@ Anderson	62–94	37–27

== NBL Playoffs ==
=== NBL Western Division Opening Round ===
Received opening round bye.

=== NBL Western Division Semifinals ===
(1W) Oshkosh All-Stars vs. (2W) Tri-Cities Blackhawks: Oshkosh wins series 3–1

- Game 1: April 6, 1949 @ Oshkosh: Oshkosh 68, Tri-Cities 66
- Game 2: April 9, 1949 @ Oshkosh: Oshkosh 73, Tri-Cities 59
- Game 3: April 10, 1949 @ Moline, Illinois (Tri-Cities): Tri-Cities 70, Oshkosh 64
- Game 4: April 12, 1949 @ Moline, Illinois (Tri-Cities): Oshkosh 70, Tri-Cities 69

=== NBL Championship ===
(1W) Oshkosh All-Stars vs. (1E) Anderson Duffey Packers: Anderson wins series 3–0

- Game 1: April 16, 1949 @ Oshkosh: Anderson 74, Oshkosh 70
- Game 2: April 17, 1949 @ Oshkosh: Anderson 72, Oshkosh 70
- Game 3: April 19, 1949 @ Anderson: Anderson 88, Oshkosh 64

=== Awards and honors ===
- First Team All-NBL – Gene Englund
- NBL All-Rookie First Team – Jack Burmaster
- NBL All-Time Team – Bob Carpenter, Ed Dancker, Leroy Edwards, and Gene Englund

== NBA Dispersal Draft ==
Originally, when the NBL and rivaling Basketball Association of America agreed to merge operations to become the National Basketball Association on August 3, 1949, the Oshkosh All-Stars were meant to join the final NBL champion Anderson Duffey Packers (who would immediately rebrand themselves to the Anderson Packers due to the BAA's side of operations not allowing for sponsored companies to be a part of team names), the original Denver Nuggets franchise, the cityside rivaling Sheboygan Red Skins, the Syracuse Nationals, the Tri-Cities Blackhawks, and recently created Waterloo Hawks alongside the planned NBL expansion team known as the Indianapolis Olympians to join the NBA as a means to have a planned 18 teams at hand with 9 teams from the BAA's side and 9 teams from the NBL's side competing in their own divisions for at least their first two seasons of play, though the Oshkosh franchise would only do so under the condition that they would move their operations out to the city of Milwaukee (though Green Bay was considered as an alternative option instead), with a potential name change in mind as well since there had been rumors that following their move to Milwaukee on June 30, 1949, the All-Stars franchise would have merged operations with an independent team out in Milwaukee called the Milwaukee Shooting Stars to become the Milwaukee All-Stars. The players that were still considered a part of the Oshkosh-turned-Milwaukee franchise at the time they were considered the 18th NBA franchise for the 1949–50 NBA season included Gene Berce, Jack Burmaster, Gene Englund, Alex Hannum, Marshall Hawkins, Walt Lautenbach, Bob Mulvihill, Glen Selbo, and Floyd Volker. However, when the planned Milwaukee franchise reverted itself back to Oshkosh and went on a hiatus of sorts by September 3 (which eventually became them playing for the more localized Wisconsin State Basketball League) that later turned into themselves folding operations altogether by 1951 following the death of franchise owner Lon Darling (though there were talks of the All-Stars joining the National Professional Basketball League at one point in time before location questions caused them to be put on hold once again on a professional basis instead), the Oshkosh All-Stars instead joined the all-black Dayton Rens and the recently created Hammond Calumet Buccaneers as the only other NBL teams to ultimately be excluded in the jump from the NBL to the NBA, which resulted in the 1949–50 NBA season using an awkward format that was more improvised on the fly following the All-Stars franchise's sudden departure from the NBA. Following that, an impromptu dispersal draft for the All-Stars' players was held in the remaining offseason period in September and October 1949, which led to Gene Englund announcing his retirement on September 29 and Bob Mulvihill being left unassigned to any of the newly established NBA teams at hand (later playing for the East Coast League's Torrington Howards as his final team), while the Indianapolis Olympians bought the player rights to Marshall Hawkins and Floyd Volker at some point between September & October 1949 before the regular season began, the Syracuse Nationals purchased Alex Hannum's player rights on September 27, the Sheboygan Red Skins purchased the player rights to both Jack Burmaster and Walt Lautenbach on October 7 alongside Glen Selbo on October 21, and the Tri-Cities Blackhawks purchased the player rights to Gene Burce on October 20, 1949. Despite the Oshkosh All-Stars not playing professionally ever again after this season, they would end up playing their 1949–50 season at the more local, minor league-based Wisconsin State Basketball League, with them being considered to play for the National Professional Basketball League the following season afterward before later being finished for good following the combination of the NPBL shutting down prematurely and team owner Lon Darling's passing by March and April 1951 respectively.
