= 1948–49 Dayton Rens season =

NBL professional basketball team season

- Head coach: Pop Gates (player-coach)
- General manager: Eric Illidge
- Owner: Bob Douglas
- Arena: Springfield High School

Results
- Record: 14–26 (.350)
- Place: Division: 4th (Eastern)
- Playoff finish: Did not qualify

The 1948–49 Dayton Rens season was the first and only professional season played for the Dayton Rens (a rebranded version of the all-black New York Renaissance barnstorming team that once won the inaugural World Professional Basketball Tournament) franchise in the National Basketball League, especially since it would ultimately be the last season for that league's general existence. While this was officially the first (and only) professional season of play for the Dayton Rens franchise (who were owned by future Naismith Basketball Hall of Famer Bob Douglas for his historic presence as the first ever African American team owner for a basketball squad, even if it was just for an all-black team like his own squad here), this would not be the first ever season played for the franchise as a whole in general, even though they would not start out this season under the Dayton Rens name nor play their season while out in the NBL at first. While this NBL season didn't originally start out with the Dayton Rens even existing at all (at least, not under that name), never mind actually playing in that league properly, the Dayton Rens franchise had originally played as the New York Renaissance starting back in 1923 (and sometimes had players still playing under that independent moniker during this season, even in road games, due to that franchise still being able to make money under that name by this point in time), which would make this its 25th (and potentially final) season of play for them as a franchise.

Once the Detroit Vagabond Kings (who began their NBL season on October 30, 1948, against the Oshkosh All-Stars) decided to fold operations from the NBL altogether by December 16, 1948, after starting their season with a very poor 2–17 record, the NBL (through commissioner Doxie Moore and president Ike Duffey) would ask for Bob Douglas to have his Renaissance team to join the NBL as a last-minute replacement team for the rest of the season the following day afterward, albeit under the conditions of having the team play as the Dayton Rens during that time instead of their usual New York Renaissance moniker (meaning they'd play their home games out in Dayton, Ohio and its nearby regions instead of in Harlem out in Manhattan, New York despite Dayton being a notably segregated area in the state of Ohio at the time due to the small following the Rens acquired in the city of Dayton) and having his team hold the same record that the Detroit Vagabond Kings had throughout the rest of the season. Due to the Rens being an all-black franchise for their entire history, the Dayton Rens would end up becoming the first ever racially integrated franchise to ever join a professional league that was previously considered all or mostly white oriented up until the day the Rens officially joined the NBL. While the Rens ended up performing a lot better than the Detroit Vagabond Kings did in the remaining games they played throughout the rest of the season (going 14–26 in the remaining 40 games they played in the NBL, which gave Dayton a total combined record of 16–43 when including the previous games the Detroit Vagabond Kings had in the NBL), they still ended up missing out on joining the final NBL Playoffs ever played altogether due, in part, to the awkward way the Eastern Division was set up on their ends (while the Eastern Division technically did have five teams competing there alongside the Western Division, the Eastern Division was forced to utilize the Rens as a last-minute replacement for the Detroit Vagabond Kings with their combined records as the official fourth and final team there for the rest of the season) alongside the Rens being forced to combine their 40 games played with the previous 19 games the Detroit Vagabond Kings had earlier in the season.

Following the final NBL season's conclusion, when the NBL merged with the rivaling Basketball Association of America on August 3, 1949, to become the modern-day National Basketball Association, the Dayton Rens ended up joining the Hammond Calumet Buccaneers and the Oshkosh All-Stars as one of three NBL teams to not only be excluded from the official BAA-NBL merger into the NBL, but also fold operations entirely not long afterward. However, with the case of the Rens, their exclusion was primarily related to racial segregation in mind for the newly established NBA due to the primary operatives of that new league coming from the BAA's side of things more than the NBL's side of things (though it had been suggested that, had the New York Renaissance won the final World Professional Basketball Tournament ever held over the Minneapolis Lakers (who had since moved onto the BAA (now NBA)), the Rens would have had greater leverage to hold as WPBT champions in order to get their potential move into the NBA to officially become a reality), though the NBA would later allow for black players to join the NBA by as early as the 1950–51 NBA season following the removal of six NBA teams (four of which came from the NBL's side of operations in the final NBL champion Anderson (Duffey) Packers, the original Denver Nuggets, the Sheboygan Red Skins, and the Waterloo Hawks all defecting from the NBA to create a short-lived rivaling league of their own called the National Professional Basketball League). However, it has been noted that the NBA wanted to keep its positive relationship with the world-famous Harlem Globetrotters (another team that was all-black at the time) and team owner Abe Saperstein up since the BAA had also struggled financially before the merger occurred and the people from the BAA's side didn't want to risk losing a key financial partner that helped them survive in their early history. Regardless of the motive, the rejection from the newly established league following the merger (to the point where the NBA wouldn't even hold a dispersal draft in relation to the Dayton Rens players who were on the team that season when compared to the other NBL and BAA teams that folded operations) would soon lead to the Rens' team owner, Bob Douglas, folding the Rens franchise entirely (both the Dayton squad from this season and the major New York franchise that remained independently ran) not too long after the BAA-NBL merger into the NBA became official, with the New York team shutting down for good by 1951.

== Dayton Rens Roster ==
Please note that due to the way records for professional basketball leagues like the NBL and the ABL were recorded at the time, some information on both teams and players may be harder to list out than usual here.

1948–49 Dayton Rens roster
Players

| Pos. | No. | Player | Height | Weight | DOB | From |
|---|---|---|---|---|---|---|
| G/F | | Rookie Brown | 6 ft 4 in (1.93 m) | 210 lb (95 kg) | 1925–02–15 | Howard |
| C | | George Crowe | 6 ft 10 in (2.08 m) | 225 lb (102 kg) | 1921–03–22 | Indiana Central |
| G/F | | Duke Cumberland | 6 ft 2 in (1.88 m) | 180 lb (82 kg) | 1915–10–20 | Scott HS (OH) |
| G/F | | Hank DeZonie | 6 ft 2 in (1.88 m) | 180 lb (82 kg) | 1922–02–12 | Clark Atlanta |
| F/C | | Bill Farrow | 6 ft 6 in (1.98 m) | 195 lb (88 kg) | 1918–06–15 | DePaul |
| F/C | | Len Ford | 6 ft 5 in (1.96 m) | 198 lb (90 kg) | 1926–02–18 | Creighton |
| G/F | | Pop Gates | 6 ft 0 in (1.83 m) | 180 lb (82 kg) | 1917–08–30 | Benjamin Franklin HS (NY) |
| G | | John Isaacs | 5 ft 11 in (1.80 m) | 160 lb (73 kg) | 1915–09–15 | Textile HS (NY) |
| PF | | Dolly King | 6 ft 5 in (1.96 m) | 195 lb (88 kg) | 1913–10–19 | Long Island |
| G | | Vic Krafft | 6 ft 0 in (1.83 m) | 168 lb (76 kg) | 1919–06–03 | Woodrow Wilson Junior College |
| C | | Longie Powell | 6 ft 7 in (2.01 m) | 210 lb (95 kg) | 1919–02–14 | Friedrich Froebel HS (IN) |
| G | | Red Pryor | 5 ft 11 in (1.80 m) | 160 lb (73 kg) | 1926–06–02 | DePaul |
| F | | Tom Sealy | 6 ft 3 in (1.91 m) | 195 lb (88 kg) | 1921–01–31 | Brooklyn College |
| G/F | | Wee Willie Smith | 6 ft 2 in (1.88 m) | 185 lb (84 kg) | 1911–04–22 | East Tech HS (OH) |
| SG | | Jim Usry | 6 ft 4 in (1.93 m) | 174 lb (79 kg) | 1922–02–22 | Lincoln University (PA) |
| F | | Eddie Wollen | 6 ft 4 in (1.93 m) | | 1909–05 | Unknown |
| G/F | | Sonny Wood | 6 ft 0 in (1.83 m) | 185 lb (84 kg) | 1922–12–31 | Benjamin Franklin HS (NY) |

Coaches
Head coach
- Pop Gates

Legend
- (DP) Unsigned draft pick
- (FA) Free agent
- (S) Suspended
- Injured

Roster

== Dayton Rens Schedule ==
Not to be confused with exhibition or other non-NBL scheduled games that did not count towards Dayton's official NBL record for this season (excluding the previous games the Detroit Vagabond Kings played in the NBL earlier this season), meaning games from the New York Renaissance's end would not count in this case. An official database created by John Grasso detailing every NBL match possible (outside of two matches that the Kankakee Gallagher Trojans won over the Dayton Metropolitans in 1938) would be released in 2026 showcasing every team's official schedules throughout their time spent in the NBL. As such, these are the official results recorded for the Dayton Rens during their only season in the NBL, with their record section showcasing only their own record of games played as a franchise and not the games that the Detroit Vagabond Kings played before they folded operations and subsequently got replaced by the Rens.

| # | Date | Opponent | Score | Record |
| 1 | December 19 | Anderson | 61–83 | 0–1 |
| 2 | December 22 | @ Hammond | 53–50 (OT) | 1–1 |
| 3 | December 26 | @ Tri-Cities | 49–70 | 1–2 |
| 4 | December 27 | N Oshkosh | 69–89 | 1–3 |
| 5 | January 11 | @ Denver | 56–47 | 2–3 |
| 6 | January 13 | @ Denver | 47–60 | 2–4 |
| 7 | January 16 | @ Waterloo | 45–59 | 2–5 |
| 8 | January 19 | N Oshkosh | 67–55 | 3–5 |
| 9 | January 20 | @ Oshkosh | 64–62 | 4–5 |
| 10 | January 23 | N Oshkosh | 49–57 | 4–6 |
| 11 | January 25 | N Denver | 70–64 | 5–6 |
| 12 | January 29 | N Syracuse | 65–85 | 5–7 |
| 13 | January 30 | @ Syracuse | 68–78 | 5–8 |
| 14 | January 31 | N Syracuse | 55–65 | 5–9 |
| 15 | February 7 | N Tri-Cities | 51–49 | 6–9 |
| 16 | February 9 | N Waterloo | 44–56 | 6–10 |
| 17 | February 10 | @ Tri-Cities | 61–54 | 7–10 |
| 18 | February 12 | N Hammond | 43–52 | 7–11 |
| 19 | February 13 | Anderson | 51–54 | 7–12 |
| 20 | February 15 | N Waterloo | 53–52 | 8–12 |
| 21 | February 16 | N Anderson | 68–76 | 8–13 |
| 22 | February 20 | @ Sheboygan | 61–59 | 9–13 |
| 23 | February 21 | N Tri-Cities | 54–74 | 9–14 |
| 24 | February 24 | @ Syracuse | 49–66 | 9–15 |
| 25 | March 3 | @ Tri-Cities | 60–58 | 10–15 |
| 26 | March 6 | @ Syracuse | 57–61 | 10–16 |
| 27 | March 9 | @ Tri-Cities | 56–65 | 10–17 |
| 28 | March 10 | N Tri-Cities | 45–68 | 10–18 |
| 29 | March 13 (Game 1) | @ Sheboygan | 52–67 | 10–19 |
| 30 | March 13 (Game 2) | @ Sheboygan | 50–52 | 10–20 |
| 31 | March 15 | N Syracuse | 69–51 | 11–20 |
| 32 | March 18 | N Hammond | 45–50 | 11–21 |
| 33 | March 19 | N Hammond | 53–62 | 11–22 |
| 34 | March 20 | @ Waterloo | 50–52 | 11–23 |
| 35 | March 21 | @ Anderson | 69–74 | 11–24 |
| 36 | March 23 | N Sheboygan | 55–60 | 11–25 |
| 37 | March 26 | N Waterloo | 61–45 | 12–25 |
| 38 | March 29 | N Denver | 69–55 | 13–25 |
| 39 | March 31 (Game 1) | @ Sheboygan | 62–68 | 13–26 |
| 40 | March 31 (Game 2) | @ Sheboygan | 61–54 | 14–26 |

== Season standings ==
| Pos. | Eastern Division | Wins | Losses | Win % |
|---|---|---|---|---|
| 1 | Anderson Duffey Packers | 49 | 15 | .766 |
| 2 | Syracuse Nationals | 40 | 23 | .635 |
| 3 | Hammond Calumet Buccaneers | 21 | 41 | .339 |
| 4 | Dayton Rens^{‡} | 14 | 26 | .350 |
| 5 | Detroit Vagabond Kings^{‡} | 2 | 17 | .105 |
^{‡} Dayton replaced Detroit, who disbanded during the season, and assumed Detroit's record in the standings for the season. Their combined record was 16–43.

== Awards and honors ==
- Pop Gates – All-Time NBL Team
