= 1948–49 Denver Nuggets season =

NBL professional basketball team season

- Head coach: Ralph Bishop (player-coach)
- General manager: Hal Davis
- Arena: Denver Arena Auditorium

Results
- Record: 18–44 (.290)
- Place: Division: 5th (Western)
- Playoff finish: Did not qualify
- Stats at Basketball Reference
- Radio: KOA

The 1948–49 NBL season was the first and only season for the original Denver Nuggets franchise in the National Basketball League for what ultimately became its twelfth and final season of existence as a league, as well as the team's sixteenth overall season of play when including their fifteen previous seasons of play as a franchise in the Amateur Athletic Union going back to 1932 under multiple team names that they had that included the Nuggets (such as the Denver Safeway-Piggly Wigglys (sometimes shortened down to the Denver Piggly Wigglys or even just the Denver Pigs), the Denver Safeway Perisianas, the first rendition of the Denver Nuggets, the Denver American Legion, and the Denver Ambrose Jellymakers before returning to the more famous Denver Nuggets name that they've used here alongside their final years in the AAU) at various points in time. It was also their first ever professional basketball season due to their promotion from the amateur-based AAU to the professional-based NBL. During their only season in the NBL, the original Nuggets franchise faced plenty of challenges due to the fact that airplanes were not yet seen as a common way to travel for long distances at a time and that trains were considered the way to travel from one destination to another at the time; while the Nuggets started out with traveling through airplanes (becoming the first professional basketball team to do so on a regular basis), they ultimately ended up converting to traveling on trains by the end of this season. Not only that, but their referees worked more akin to American football referees (with handkerchiefs being thrown during fouls, similar to flags for football's penalties) due to them hiring referees that were from the Mountain League at the time (thus showcasing Denver's representation in the Western Division for the NBL), which combined with the unique location of Denver, Colorado (especially when compared to the rest of the NBL's formatting) made the preparation for road games in Denver for their opponents a bit tougher to deal with for their ends (at least at first) due to every other team in the NBL being in or around the Great Lakes area and those same opponents usually (though not always) playing in Denver for two games in three nights before returning home in the East coast. Despite the supposed advantage in their home area, the Nuggets would lose their first 10 games of the season (with their first seven games all being on the road before having their first home game on November 15, 1948, against the Oshkosh All-Stars) before later getting their first win of the season on November 25 (ten days after their professional home debut) with a 60–51 win over the Tri-Cities Blackhawks. While the Nuggets would later end up gaining more victories throughout the season (first going 9–19 by the end of December (despite two of those defeats being against the short-lived Detroit Vagabond Kings on November 9 and December 7, 1948, through 56–48 and 86–76 losses on those respective dates) and then 12–20 by February 17), their early losses would prove to be too much for the former AAU franchise to overcome, as they would not only trade their leading scorer, Ward Gibson, to the Tri-Cities Blackhawks (partially to help themselves out financially due in part to competition against the relatively new National Industrial Basketball League's Denver Chevrolets team and partially to get him to a playoff contending team while also helping out his fear of flying), but also later lost eleven straight games to close out their season after previously being only six games behind the fourth place Waterloo Hawks at one point in time, which led to them finishing the season with the worst record in the NBL (at least in terms of teams that actually finished their seasons properly) with an 18–44 record (including only three road wins against the Detroit Vagabond Kings, Waterloo Hawks, and Hammond Calumet Buccaneers to go with an even 15–15 home record) to finish their only season in the NBL. Hoot Gibson would end up making it to the final All-NBL Second Team ever announced, with this roster also being notable for having future Democratic Party representative Mo Udall playing on the team.

Following the conclusion of this season, on August 3, 1949, a merger between the Basketball Association of America and the National Basketball League (which the Nuggets first played for) was completed to have them become the modern-day National Basketball Association. Despite the struggles the original Denver Nuggets franchise had during their only season in the NBL, they would still join the final NBL champion Anderson Duffey Packers (who since rebranded themselves to the Anderson Packers due to the new league not allowing for sponsorships to be a part of any team names), the Sheboygan Red Skins, the Syracuse Nationals, the Tri-Cities Blackhawks, and the Waterloo Hawks as the six NBL teams from their final season of play to join the newly created NBL alongside the planned Indianapolis Olympians NBL expansion team. However, after having an even worse record in their only season in the NBA with an 11–51 record and an even worse 15-game losing streak to start out that season (which was a league record for the worst start to a season in the NBA until the Miami Heat's inaugural NBA season broke that record), the original Denver Nuggets franchise would resort to joining the Anderson Packers (who previously withdrew from the NBA themselves two weeks before the Nuggets did due to health issues involving that team's owner), the Sheboygan Red Skins, and the Waterloo Hawks in their departure from the NBA on April 24, 1950 (one day before the 1950 NBA draft was set to begin) in order to create what ultimately became the short-lived rivaling National Professional Basketball League as a failed effort to survive beyond the NBA, with these Nuggets first becoming the Denver Frontier Refiners (sometimes shortened out to just the Denver Refiners) and then the Evansville Agogans in the NPBL before they ended up folding during that short-lived failure of a season.

Denver would not see a new professional basketball team until the American Basketball Association saw the Denver Rockets come to fruition as an inaugural team there following a failed creation of an ABA team in Kansas City, Missouri and troubled early starts with finding a team name for them after the initial "Denver Larks" and "Denver Lark Buntings" got canned by an eleventh-hour ownership change to help save the franchise early on. Despite those early troubles, however, the Rockets proved to be one of the stronger ABA franchises in that league's existence (by stark contrast to the original Nuggets franchise once they became a professional basketball franchise) before later changing their team name in 1974 to the Denver Nuggets, partially as a tribute to the same Nuggets team that previously played in both the NBL and the NBA (despite not taking their previous history in the NBL or the NBA in the process), but also because the Denver Rockets wanted to avoid any team naming issues with the Houston Rockets (formerly known as the San Diego Rockets) franchise that the NBA had created around the same time once an impending ABA-NBA merger occurred, which eventually did happen in 1976. The new Nuggets franchise still operates under that team name to this day, having recently won the NBA Finals in 2023 as the Denver Nuggets.

== Draft picks ==
The original Denver Nuggets franchise would participate in the 1948 NBL draft, which occurred right after the 1948 BAA draft when plans for a joint draft between the National Basketball League and the rivaling Basketball Association of America ultimately fell out when the defending NBL champion Minneapolis Lakers, Rochester Royals, Fort Wayne Zollner Pistons, and Indianapolis Kautskys turned Jets all defected from the NBL to the BAA. However, as of 2026, no records of what the original Nuggets' draft picks might have been for the NBL have properly come up (assuming they even would be ready by the time the 1948 NBL draft began), with any information on who those selections might have been (especially since the Denver franchise would be considered an expansion franchise for the NBL this season) being lost to time in the process.

== Roster ==
1948–49 Denver Nuggets roster
Players

Pos.	No.	Player	Height	Weight	DOB	From
G		Leonard Alterman	6 ft 3 in (1.91 m)	185 lb (84 kg)	1922–03–08	Denver
F		Ralph Bishop	6 ft 3 in (1.91 m)	185 lb (84 kg)	1915–10–01	Washington
F/C	28	Jack Cotton	6 ft 7 in (2.01 m)	200 lb (91 kg)	1924–10–25	Wyoming
G	25	Jimmy Darden	6 ft 1 in (1.85 m)	170 lb (77 kg)	1922–06–19	Denver
F/C	20	Bob Doll	6 ft 5 in (1.96 m)	195 lb (88 kg)	1919–08–10	Colorado
F/C		Hoot Gibson	6 ft 5 in (1.96 m)	198 lb (90 kg)	1921–12–05	Creighton
C		Ace Gruenig	6 ft 8 in (2.03 m)	220 lb (100 kg)	1913–03–12	Crane Tech HS (IL)
G/F	21	Al Guokas	6 ft 5 in (1.96 m)	200 lb (91 kg)	1925–07–08	Saint Joseph's
G/F		Hal Hutcheson	6 ft 5 in (1.96 m)	190 lb (86 kg)	1920–05–16	Maryville State
G		Gene Lalley	5 ft 9 in (1.75 m)	160 lb (73 kg)	1922–08–12	Creighton
G/F		Guy Mitchell	6 ft 3 in (1.91 m)	190 lb (86 kg)	1923–01–03	Pittsburg State
F		Mo Udall	6 ft 5 in (1.96 m)	200 lb (91 kg)	1922–06–15	Arizona
G		Kayo Wnorowski	6 ft 0 in (1.83 m)	215 lb (98 kg)	1921–10–04	Siena

Coaches
Head coach
- Ralph Bishop

Legend
- (DP) Unsigned draft pick
- (FA) Free agent
- (S) Suspended
- Injured

Roster

== Regular season ==
=== Season standings ===
Pos.	Western Division	Wins	Losses	Win %
1	Oshkosh All-Stars	37	27	.578
2	Tri-Cities Blackhawks	36	28	.563
3	Sheboygan Red Skins	35	29	.547
4	Waterloo Hawks	30	32	.484
5	Denver Nuggets	18	44	.290

=== NBL Schedule ===
Not to be confused with exhibition or other non-NBL scheduled games that did not count towards Denver's official NBL record for this season. An official database created by John Grasso detailing every NBL match possible (outside of two matches that the Kankakee Gallagher Trojans won over the Dayton Metropolitans in 1938) would be released in 2026 showcasing every team's official schedules throughout their time spent in the NBL. As such, these are the official results recorded for the original Denver Nuggets franchise during their only season in the NBL before moving on into the NBA for their upcoming season of play.

#	Date	Opponent	Score	Record
1	November 3	@ Hammond	39–58	0–1
2	November 4	@ Sheboygan	52–67	0–2
3	November 6	@ Anderson	52–82	0–3
4	November 7	@ Syracuse	40–54	0–4
5	November 9	N Detroit	54–56	0–5
6	November 10	@ Waterloo	48–51 (OT)	0–6
7	November 13	@ Tri-Cities	58–70	0–7
8	November 15	Oshkosh	50–60	0–8
9	November 17	@ Oshkosh	46–56	0–9
10	November 22	Tri-Cities	49–54	0–10
11	November 24	Tri-Cities	60–51	1–10
12	November 28	Sheboygan	58–53	2–10
13	November 29	Sheboygan	58–62	2–11
14	December 2	@ Tri-Cities	76–80	2–12
15	December 4	@ Detroit	64–56	3–12
16	December 5	@ Syracuse	64–76	3–13
17	December 6	@ Anderson	57–72	3–14
18	December 7	@ Detroit	76–86	3–15
19	December 8	@ Hammond	52–57 (OT)	3–16
20	December 9	@ Sheboygan	45–52	3–17
21	December 11	@ Tri-Cities	62–82	3–18
22	December 12	@ Waterloo	53–51	4–18
23	December 14	Waterloo	65–60	5–18
24	December 16	Waterloo	69–51	6–18
25	December 20	Syracuse	60–54	7–18
26	December 22	Syracuse	49–59	7–19
27	December 28	Hammond	78–76	8–19
28	December 30	Hammond	61–60	9–19
29	January 5	Tri-Cities	50–44	10–19
30	January 7	Tri-Cities	58–69	10–20
31	January 11	Dayton	47–56	10–21
32	January 13	Dayton	60–47	11–21
33	January 15	@ Oshkosh	38–64	11–22
34	January 16	@ Hammond	73–71	12–22
35	January 17	@ Anderson	76–118	12–23
36	January 20	@ Syracuse	55–59	12–24
37	January 23	@ Syracuse	57–82	12–25
38	January 24	@ Anderson	65–76	12–26
39	January 25	N Dayton	64–70	12–27
40	January 26	@ Waterloo	60–82	12–28
41	February 2	Anderson	60–61	12–29
42	February 4	Anderson	49–71	12–30
43	February 8	Oshkosh	50–60	12–31
44	February 10	Oshkosh	59–61 (OT)	12–32
45	February 16	Syracuse	66–71	12–33
46	February 18	Syracuse	71–54	13–33
47	February 22	Sheboygan	82–80 (2OT)	14–33
48	February 24	Sheboygan	69–62	15–33
49	March 3	Anderson	62–71	15–34
50	March 5	Anderson	76–73 (OT)	16–34
51	March 8	@ Hammond	68–53	17–34
52	March 10	Hammond	56–53	18–34
53	March 15	Waterloo	58–60 (OT)	18–35
54	March 17	Waterloo	64–68	18–36
55	March 19	@ Oshkosh	58–59	18–37
56	March 20	@ Sheboygan	40–55	18–38
57	March 21	N Oshkosh	47–61	18–39
58	March 22	@ Hammond	58–69	18–40
59	March 24	@ Tri-Cities	57–59	18–41
60	March 26	@ Oshkosh	54–63	18–42
61	March 27	@ Sheboygan	53–60	18–43
62	March 29	N Dayton	55–69	18–44

Two more games against either the Detroit Vagabond Kings or the Dayton Rens (or some other team) were intended to have been played by the Nuggets as well, but those games were ultimately cancelled either due to the Detroit Vagabond Kings folding operations before being replaced by the Dayton Rens or due to outside circumstances beyond their control, such as weather/travel issues or the lack of care for providing a proper conclusion due to the lack of overall change in playoff positioning either by Denver's end or for (Detroit/)Dayton's end(s) there.

== Awards and honors ==
- Hoot Gibson – All-NBL Second Team
