= 1949–50 Oshkosh All-Stars season =

NBL professional basketball team season

- League: Wisconsin State Basketball League
- Head coach: Dave Leibenson
- General manager: Lon Darling
- Owner(s): Lon Darling
- Arena: South Park School Gymnasium

Results
- Record: 15–9 (.625)
- Place: Conference: 2nd (1st half); 4th (2nd half)
- Playoff finish: Did not qualify. (The Fond du Lac Rockets won the WSBL's championship due to them getting the best overall record of the season.)

The 1949–50 Oshkosh All-Stars season was the All-Stars' only season of play in the Wisconsin State Basketball League, which was a minor basketball league held exclusively within the state of Wisconsin in the sport's early history. However, if one were to include the independent seasons they played starting all the way back in 1929 combined with their seasons played in the National Basketball League from 1937 until it went defunct in 1949 through that league's merger with the Basketball Association of America to become the present-day National Basketball Association, this would officially be their twentieth and final season of play instead. Originally, the All-Stars were considered to be included as one of the NBL's teams from the previous season to enter the NBA for the 1949–50 NBA season in order to have a more balanced format in mind for what would be that league's first ever season under that proper name. However, in order for the All-Stars to enter the NBA properly, the team needed to move their operations from Oshkosh to Milwaukee, with Green Bay being considered as an alternative location to play in at the time instead; while the All-Stars initially were accepted in for the merger that became the NBA (albeit under the planned Milwaukee All-Stars name), the team under Lon Darling's ownership ended up reneging on their original decision and withdrew from the NBA before that season began, leaving the newly merged league with 17 teams competing in three divisions under a messy format instead of 18 teams under two divisions representing the former leagues at hand. At the same time, rather than competing as an independent team once again while playing at home in the South Park Middle School's Gymnasium, the All-Stars would decide to compete in the minor Wisconsin State Basketball League as one of seven teams competing in that league, with Oshkosh replacing the team known as the Sheboygan Dicks there. Unlike the NBL or NBA where they would utilize a proper regular season with a proper playoff format, the Wisconsin State Basketball League would operate under a split season format of twelve games each where the two best teams in each half-season played would compete in a championship series, if deemed necessary.

For the first half of the season, under new head coach Dave Leibenson, Oshkosh (under a roster that featured some of the players from the previous season's roster, including veteran star center Leroy Edwards) would get an above-average 9–3 record that would ultimately put them in a second-place finish for that particular half of the season behind only the Fond du Lac Rockets (a new team that was added in place of the nearby North Fond du Lac Tigers), who beat them by one game during that half of the season. As for the second half of the season, however, the All-Stars would end up getting only an average 6–6 record for that half (with one of the games including a match where Oshkosh would technically be considered a forfeited loss to the Kimberly Papermakers), which put them in fourth place ahead of the Kimberly Papermakers, Manitowoc Braves, and Neenah Bluejackets, but behind the Two Rivers Seals, New Holstein Athletics (who might have formerly been the New Holstein Cheesemakers), and Fond du Lac Rockets. While the All-Stars failed to qualify for the Wisconsin State Basketball League's championship series, the WSBL would not need one for this season due to the Fond du Lac Rockets being named the league's new champions by default due to them winning both halves of the season. Following this season's conclusion, the Oshkosh All-Stars would initially apply to the National Professional Basketball League that was created by four former NBL teams in the Anderson Packers, the original Denver Nuggets franchise (later renamed the Denver Frontier Refiners), the cityside rivaling Sheboygan Red Skins, and the Waterloo Hawks in an attempt to return to professional basketball and compete against the NBA in a rivaling manner that could potentially support the smaller locations in the nation. However, due in part to the NPBL being unsure on whether the team would still compete in Oshkosh or move to Milwaukee, the newly created league would decide to hold the All-Stars as a team for entry in the NPBL for the following season. Unfortunately for them, the combination of the NPBL's inaugural season soon resulting in it falling apart as a rivaling league by the end of its only season of play and team owner Lon Darling dying from a heart attack on April 19, 1951, would lead to the All-Stars meeting their official end as a franchise without competing in another basketball league for the 1950–51 season. There is a feeling among local Wisconsinites and Oshkoshians that had the Oshkosh All-Stars been allowed to remain as an NBA team instead of aborting their NBA plans entirely before they even began, they could have continued to compete in the league even in the present day similar to what the Green Bay Packers have done for the NFL.

== Draft picks ==
The Oshkosh All-Stars would participate in the 1949 NBL draft, which occurred months before the National Basketball League and the rivaling Basketball Association of America would merge operations to become the present-day National Basketball Association. However, as of 2026, no records of what the All-Stars' draft picks were for the NBL have properly come up, with any information on who those final selections might have been being lost to time in the process. (However, it is possible that some of the players either on this team's roster or those that would be designated in the NBA's dispersal draft with regards to this team would be involved as some of the drafted players in question there.)

== NBA Dispersal Draft ==
Originally, when the NBL and rivaling Basketball Association of America agreed to merge operations to become the National Basketball Association on August 3, 1949, the Oshkosh All-Stars were meant to join the final NBL champion Anderson Duffey Packers (who would immediately rebrand themselves to the Anderson Packers due to the BAA's side of operations not allowing for sponsored companies to be a part of team names), the original Denver Nuggets franchise, the cityside rivaling Sheboygan Red Skins, the Syracuse Nationals, the Tri-Cities Blackhawks, and recently created Waterloo Hawks alongside the planned NBL expansion team known as the Indianapolis Olympians to join the NBA as a means to have a planned 18 teams at hand with 9 teams from the BAA's side and 9 teams from the NBL's side competing in their own divisions for at least their first two seasons of play, though the Oshkosh franchise would only do so under the condition that they would move their operations out to the city of Milwaukee (though Green Bay was considered as an alternative option instead), with a potential name change in mind as well since there had been rumors that following their move to Milwaukee on June 30, 1949, the All-Stars franchise would have merged operations with an independent team out in Milwaukee called the Milwaukee Shooting Stars to become the Milwaukee All-Stars. The players that were still considered a part of the Oshkosh-turned-Milwaukee franchise at the time they were considered the 18th NBA franchise for the 1949–50 NBA season included Gene Berce, Jack Burmaster, Gene Englund, Alex Hannum, Marshall Hawkins, Walt Lautenbach, Bob Mulvihill, Glen Selbo, and Floyd Volker. However, when the planned Milwaukee franchise reverted itself back to Oshkosh and went on a hiatus of sorts by September 3 (which eventually became them playing for the more localized Wisconsin State Basketball League) that later turned into themselves folding operations altogether by 1951 following the death of franchise owner Lon Darling (though there were talks of the All-Stars joining the National Professional Basketball League at one point in time before location questions caused them to be put on hold once again on a professional basis instead), the Oshkosh All-Stars instead joined the all-black Dayton Rens and the recently created Hammond Calumet Buccaneers as the only other NBL teams to ultimately be excluded in the jump from the NBL to the NBA, which resulted in the 1949–50 NBA season using an awkward format that was more improvised on the fly following the All-Stars franchise's sudden departure from the NBA before the regular season began there. Following that decision, an impromptu dispersal draft for the All-Stars' players was held in the remaining offseason period in September and October 1949, which led to Gene Englund announcing his retirement on September 29 and Bob Mulvihill being left unassigned to any of the newly established NBA teams at hand (with Mulvihill later returning to the All-Stars franchise in the WSBL before eventually playing for the East Coast League's Torrington Howards as his final team), while the Indianapolis Olympians bought the player rights to Marshall Hawkins and Floyd Volker at some point between September & October 1949 before the regular season began, the Syracuse Nationals purchased Alex Hannum's player rights on September 27, the Sheboygan Red Skins purchased the player rights to both Jack Burmaster and Walt Lautenbach on October 7 alongside Glen Selbo on October 21, and the Tri-Cities Blackhawks purchased the player rights to Gene Burce on October 20, 1949. As for the All-Stars franchise, instead of going defunct this season similar to what the Chicago American Gears had done during their 1947–48 season within their brief time spent in the Professional Basketball League of America, they would decide to remain in Oshkosh, but compete as a minor league team this season in the local Wisconsin State Basketball League.

== Roster ==
Due to information on minor league players like those from the Wisconsin State Basketball League being generally hard, if not downright impossible to find, there are bound to be more gaps and/or inaccuracies found in certain areas on the team's roster spots than usual.

1949–50 Oshkosh All-Stars roster
Players

Pos.	No.	Player	Height	Weight	DOB	From
G/F		Gene Berce	5 ft 11 in (1.80 m)	175 lb (79 kg)	1926–11–22	Marquette
F/C		Ken Buehler	6 ft 2 in (1.88 m)	185 lb (84 kg)	1919–11–19	Milwaukee
G/F		Paul Cloyd	6 ft 2 in (1.88 m)	180 lb (82 kg)	1920–06–13	Wisconsin
C		Leroy Edwards	6 ft 5 in (1.96 m)	210 lb (95 kg)	1914–04–11	Kentucky
F/C		Gene Englund	6 ft 5 in (1.96 m)	205 lb (93 kg)	1917–10–21	Wisconsin
		Charlie Erban			1926–10–20	Unknown
F/C		Ed Erban	6 ft 4 in (1.93 m)	220 lb (100 kg)	1921–07–06	Marquette
		Jud Girard			1927–01–25	Unknown
		Gil Hertz			1922–05–23	Unknown
G/F		Bill McDonald	6 ft 3 in (1.91 m)	190 lb (86 kg)	1916–11–05	Marquette
G		Bob Mulvihill	6 ft 1 in (1.85 m)	185 lb (84 kg)	1924–03–09	Fordham
		Joe Rahn			1922–06–28	Unknown
G/F		Billy Reed	5 ft 11 in (1.80 m)	185 lb (84 kg)	1922–11–12	Shawano HS (WI)
		Spencer Van Ess			1924–04–30	Unknown
		Don Weaver			1926–09–02	Unknown

Coaches
Head coach
- Dave Leibenson

Legend
- (DP) Unsigned draft pick
- (FA) Free agent
- (S) Suspended
- Injured

Note: It's not 100% certain that both Jud Girard and Gil Hertz would appear with the team this season (at least in terms of WSBL games played) since the only game without a known box score that was available somewhere was a game played on December 28, 1949, against New Holstein's team, and those two might have played in that particular match there.

== Wisconsin State Basketball League Standings ==
First Half
Team	Wins	Losses	Winning %
Fond du Lac Rockets	10	2	.833
Oshkosh All-Stars	9	3	.750
Two Rivers Seals	8	3	.727
Neenah Bluejackets	6	6	.500
New Holstein Athletics	6	6	.500
Manitowoc Braves	4	8	.333
Kimberly Papermakers	2	10	.167

Second Half
Team	Wins	Losses	Winning %
Fond du Lac Rockets	11	1	.917
New Holstein Athletics	9	3	.750
Two Rivers Seals	7	4	.636
Oshkosh All-Stars	6	6	.500
Neenah Bluejackets	5	7	.417
Manitowoc Braves	4	8	.333
Kimberly Papermakers	2	10	.167
