= 1948–49 Waterloo Hawks season =

NBL professional basketball team season

- Head coach: Charley Shipp (player-coach)
- Arena: McElroy Auditorium

Results
- Record: 30–32 (.484)
- Place: Division: 4th (Western)
- Playoff finish: Did not qualify
- Stats at Basketball Reference

The 1948–49 Waterloo Hawks season was their first professional season played and the only season they would play in the National Basketball League, as it would ultimately be the last season for that league's general existence. The Waterloo Hawks became the first (and currently only) professional team in any of what would eventually become one of the four major sports leagues to play in the state of Iowa (while the Tri-Cities Blackhawks technically represented Iowa due to the association of Davenport, Iowa being included with Moline and Rock Island County, Illinois for the Tri-Cities area (as it was known at the time), the Wharton Field House that they primarily played in was held in Moline, Illinois specifically) due to them replacing the Toledo Jeeps after they failed to switch leagues from the NBL to the rivaling Basketball Association of America and their financial struggles proved to be too much for Toledo's ownership group to overcome. Originally, the Hawks were meant to play as a team out in nearby Des Moines, Iowa (potentially being the Des Moines Hawks along the way) instead, but due to the less than favorable enthusiasm for having a professional basketball franchise in Des Moines (which could have potentially been related to the treatment of the Waterloo Pro-Hawks from the short-lived Professional Basketball League of America, a team that also has no connection to the actual Waterloo Hawks franchise, especially since the former team couldn't come up with a team name until halftime of their first game played), the franchise would barely be approved their move to nearby Waterloo before the season began with a 5-2 vote (with one of the nay votes coming from the Detroit Vagabond Kings) on August 16, 1948. Initially, Waterloo started their only NBL season with a 9–1 record by December 2, 1948, with their only loss being against the Tri-Cities Blackhawks on November 17 that year, though they ended up having a major skid by the middle of December which saw them get a 12–14 by the end of the year, falling out of leading the Western Division and being more in the third place race in the Western Division by this time instead. However, by February 21, 1949, the Hawks would see themselves having a significantly below-average record of 21–26, being a far cry from where they first began their season, with their final record of 30–32 resulting in them missing out on participating in the 1949 NBL Playoffs entirely due to the Western Division only allowing for three teams to compete in the league's final playoffs ever held (which were held by the Sheboygan Red Skins, Tri-Cities Blackhawks, and Oshkosh All-Stars) in order to compensate for the Eastern Division having four official teams (unofficially five teams with the Detroit Vagabond Kings first entering the NBL to start the season and then the Dayton Rens being the team to replace them and close out the season) for its final season of play. Notably, this roster would hold Dick Mehen as one of the final five members of the All-NBL First Team in the league's history. In addition to that, the team would also have player-coach Charley Shipp as a member of their team; not only would he alongside the Oshkosh All-Stars' Leroy Edwards be the only two players to play in all twelve of the NBL's seasons under that name (or all fourteen of its seasons if you include the two seasons that they used the original Midwest Basketball Conference name), but Shipp would also be the only player between the two of them to also end up playing a season out in the NBA as well before retiring from play.

On August 3, 1949, a merger between the Basketball Association of America and the National Basketball League (which Waterloo first played for) was completed to have them become the modern-day National Basketball Association, which saw the Hawks join the final NBL champion Anderson Duffey Packers (who since rebranded themselves to the Anderson Packers due to the new league not allowing for sponsorships to be a part of any team names), the original Denver Nuggets, the Sheboygan Red Skins, the Syracuse Nationals, and the Tri-Cities Blackhawks as the six NBL teams from that final season joining the newly established league alongside the planned Indianapolis Olympians NBL expansion team. After completing their only season in the NBA, the Waterloo Hawks soon joined the Sheboygan Red Skins, the original Denver Nuggets (who would later rebrand themselves as the Denver Frontier Refiners at first), and the previously withdrawn Anderson Packers (who left the NBA weeks before the other three teams did due to pressure involving other big market teams in places like New York, Boston, and Philadelphia alongside the higher costs involved with the newly-formed NBA being too much for them to bare) the day before the 1950 NBA draft was set to begin on April 24, 1950, to create the short-lived rivaling National Professional Basketball League as a failed effort to survive beyond the NBA. The Tri-Cities Blackhawks would later take their team name (or rather, shorten their Blackhawks name down to just the Hawks) in order to play as the Hawks starting in 1951 when they moved to Milwaukee, with them continuing to use the Hawks name to this day (albeit with them currently playing as the Atlanta Hawks instead of staying in the nearby Tri-Cities area (since rebranded as the Quad Cities area) that Moline, Illinois was a part of at the time or continuing to play in Milwaukee, with these Hawks once winning the 1958 NBA Finals while playing in St. Louis).

== Draft picks ==
The Waterloo Hawks would participate in the 1948 NBL draft, which occurred right after the 1948 BAA draft when plans for a joint draft between the National Basketball League and the rivaling Basketball Association of America ultimately fell out when the defending NBL champion Minneapolis Lakers, Rochester Royals, Fort Wayne Zollner Pistons, and Indianapolis Kautskys turned Jets all defected from the NBL to the BAA. However, as of 2026, no records of what the Hawks' draft picks might have been for the NBL have properly come up (assuming they even would be ready by the time the 1948 NBL draft began), with any information on who those selections might have been (especially since the Hawks would be an expansion franchise for the NBL this season) being lost to time in the process.

== Roster ==
1948–49 Waterloo Hawks roster
Players

Pos.	No.	Player	Height	Weight	DOB	From
C		Harry Boykoff	6 ft 10 in (2.08 m)	225 lb (102 kg)	1922–07–24	St. John's
G/F		Bill Brown	6 ft 3 in (1.91 m)	205 lb (93 kg)	1922–08–02	Maryland
F/C		Les Deaton	6 ft 4 in (1.93 m)	210 lb (95 kg)	1923–09–23	Simpson
C		Ray Ellefson	6 ft 8 in (2.03 m)	230 lb (104 kg)	1922–09–18	Oklahoma State
F/C		Gordon Flick	6 ft 3 in (1.91 m)	200 lb (91 kg)	1921–08–13	Drake
F/C		Elmer Gainer	6 ft 6 in (1.98 m)	195 lb (88 kg)	1918–11–22	DePaul
G/F		Dale Hamilton	6 ft 0 in (1.83 m)	180 lb (82 kg)	1919–08–16	Franklin (IN)
G		Leo Kubiak	5 ft 11 in (1.80 m)	160 lb (73 kg)	1926–12–25	Bowling Green
F/C		Bobby Lowther	6 ft 5 in (1.96 m)	190 lb (86 kg)	1923–12–14	LSU
PF		Dick Mehen	6 ft 5 in (1.96 m)	195 lb (88 kg)	1922–05–20	Tennessee
G/F		Ben Schadler	6 ft 0 in (1.83 m)	185 lb (84 kg)	1924–03–09	Northwestern
G/F		Rollie Seltz	5 ft 10 in (1.78 m)	165 lb (75 kg)	1924–01–25	Hamline
G/F		Charley Shipp	6 ft 1 in (1.85 m)	200 lb (91 kg)	1913–12–03	Catholic
F		Jack Spencer	6 ft 3 in (1.91 m)	160 lb (73 kg)	1923–04–25	Iowa
G		Dave Wareham	6 ft 1 in (1.85 m)	185 lb (84 kg)	1924–06–28	Loras College

Coaches
Head coach
- Charley Shipp

Legend
- (DP) Unsigned draft pick
- (FA) Free agent
- (S) Suspended
- Injured

Roster

== Regular season ==
=== Season standings ===
Pos.	Western Division	Wins	Losses	Win %
1	Oshkosh All-Stars	37	27	.578
2	Tri-Cities Blackhawks	36	28	.563
3	Sheboygan Red Skins	35	29	.547
4	Waterloo Hawks	30	32	.484
5	Denver Nuggets	18	44	.290

=== Exhibition Games ===
Reference: Tim Harwood's Ball Hawks: The Arrival and Departure of the NBA in Iowa

- October 21, 1948: Tri-Cities Blackhawks 47, Waterloo Hawks 38 (@ Tama, Iowa)
- October 24, 1948: Famous Globe Trotters 35, Waterloo Hawks 57 (@ Marshalltown, Iowa)
- October 25, 1948: Famous Globe Trotters 40, Waterloo Hawks 69 (@ Newton, Iowa)
- October 26, 1948: Famous Globe Trotters 25, Waterloo Hawks 54 (@ Centerville, Iowa)
- October 27, 1948: Famous Globe Trotters 40, Waterloo Hawks 63 (@ Humboldt, Iowa)
- October 28, 1948: Famous Globe Trotters 33, Waterloo Hawks 55 (@ Denison, Iowa)
- October 30, 1948: Cedar Rapids Danceland 33, Waterloo Hawks 59 (@ Waterloo, Iowa)
- October 31, 1948: Famous Globe Trotters 37, Waterloo Hawks 57 (@ Waterloo, Iowa)
- November 1, 1948: Tri-Cities Blackhawks 62, Waterloo Hawks 48 (@ Dubuque, Iowa)
- November 8, 1948: Oshkosh All-Stars 60, Waterloo Hawks 50 (@ Eau Claire, Wisconsin)
- November 9, 1948: Oshkosh All-Stars 69, Waterloo Hawks 65 (@ La Crosse, Wisconsin)
- January 2, 1949: Cedar Rapids Raiders 45, Waterloo Hawks 62 (@ Waterloo, Iowa)
- January 3, 1949: Cedar Rapids Raiders 46, Waterloo Hawks 54 (@ Waterloo, Iowa)

The Famous Globe Trotters team in question are an all-black team that's actually a mock-up of the world-famous (all-black) Harlem Globetrotters.

=== NBL Schedule ===
Not to be confused with exhibition or other non-NBL scheduled games that did not count towards Waterloo's official NBL record for this season. An official database created by John Grasso detailing every NBL match possible (outside of two matches that the Kankakee Gallagher Trojans won over the Dayton Metropolitans in 1938) would be released in 2026 showcasing every team's official schedules throughout their time spent in the NBL. As such, these are the official results recorded for the Waterloo Hawks during their only season in the NBL before moving on into the NBA for their upcoming season of play.

#	Date	Opponent	Score	Record
1	November 7	Sheboygan	64–61	1–0
2	November 10	Denver	51–48 (OT)	2–0
3	November 14	Detroit	72–53	3–0
4	November 16	@ Tri-Cities	63–67	3–1
5	November 17	Hammond	51–45	4–1
6	November 21	Oshkosh	54–49	5–1
7	November 24	Syracuse	68–59	6–1
8	November 25	@ Hammond	58–57	7–1
9	November 28	Tri-Cities	61–59	8–1
10	November 30	@ Detroit	65–63	9–1
11	December 2	@ Syracuse	59–68	9–2
12	December 3	N Syracuse	71–72	9–3
13	December 5	Oshkosh	41–36	10–3
14	December 6	N Oshkosh	56–58	10–4
15	December 7	N Oshkosh	49–64	10–5
16	December 9	@ Anderson	59–71	10–6
17	December 12	Denver	51–53	10–7
18	December 14	@ Denver	60–65	10–8
19	December 16	@ Denver	51–69	10–9
20	December 19	Oshkosh	47–46	11–9
21	December 22	Anderson	50–45	12–9
22	December 23	@ Sheboygan	56–77	12–10
23	December 26	@ Hammond	61–64	12–11
24	December 28	N Oshkosh	65–71	12–12
25	December 29	Anderson	50–51	12–13
26	December 30	@ Anderson	68–80	12–14
27	January 5	@ Sheboygan	52–43	13–14
28	January 6	@ Sheboygan	51–54	13–15
29	January 9	Oshkosh	62–39	14–15
30	January 12	Anderson	46–40	15–15
31	January 13	@ Tri-Cities	68–72	15–16
32	January 16	Dayton	59–45	16–16
33	January 19	Tri-Cities	42–46	16–17
34	January 26	Denver	82–60	17–17
35	January 30	Sheboygan	60–46	18–17
36	February 2	@ Tri-Cities	70–59	19–17
37	February 3	@ Tri-Cities	63–56	20–17
38	February 6	@ Syracuse	75–79	20–18
39	February 7	@ Anderson	63–74	20–19
40	February 9	N Dayton	56–44	21–19
41	February 10	@ Sheboygan	63–78	21–20
42	February 12	@ Oshkosh	50–51	21–21
43	February 13	Sheboygan	54–55	21–22
44	February 15	N Dayton	52–53	21–23
45	February 16	@ Tri-Cities	58–63	21–24
46	February 20	@ Anderson	54–58	21–25
47	February 21	N Syracuse	65–76	21–26
48	February 23	Hammond	63–61	22–26
49	February 25	Hammond	65–52	23–26
50	February 27	@ Hammond	73–63	24–26
51	March 2	Hammond	64–58	25–26
52	March 3	@ Sheboygan	57–63	25–27
53	March 6	@ Hammond	72–81	25–28
54	March 7	@ Anderson	53–69	25–29
55	March 9	N Syracuse	51–61	25–30
56	March 10	Syracuse	65–61	26–30
57	March 13	Tri-Cities	49–50	26–31
58	March 15	@ Denver	60–58 (OT)	27–31
59	March 17	@ Denver	68–64	28–31
60	March 20	Dayton	52–50	29–31
61	March 26	N Dayton	45–61	29–32
62	March 31	Syracuse	69–68	30–32

Two more games against either the Detroit Vagabond Kings or the Dayton Rens (or some other team like the Hammond Calumet Buccaneers) were intended to have been played by the Hawks as well, but those games were ultimately cancelled either due to the Detroit Vagabond Kings folding operations before being replaced by the Dayton Rens or due to outside circumstances beyond their control, such as weather/travel issues or the lack of care for providing a proper conclusion due to the lack of overall change in playoff positioning either by Waterloo's end or for (Detroit/)Dayton's end(s) there.

== Awards and honors ==
- All-NBL First Team – Dick Mehen
- NBL All-Rookie Second Team – Leo Kubiak
- All-Time NBL Team – Charley Shipp
