= 1948–49 Sheboygan Red Skins season =

NBL professional basketball team season

- Head coach: Ken Suesens (player-coach)
- Arena: Sheboygan Municipal Auditorium and Armory

Results
- Record: 35–29 (.547)
- Place: Division: 3rd (Western)
- Playoff finish: Lost Western Division opening round (Blackhawks), 2–0

The 1948–49 Sheboygan Red Skins season was the Red Skins' eleventh and final year in the United States' National Basketball League (NBL), which would also be the twelfth and final year the NBL itself existed before it ended up being merged with the younger, yet equally rivaling Basketball Association of America professional basketball league. However, if one were to include their few seasons they played as an independent team under a few various team names involving local businesses like the The Ballhorns (being sponsored by a local florist and funeral parlor), the Art Imigs (being sponsored by a local dry cleaning shop owned and operated by a man named Art Imig with team jerseys saying Art Imig's), and the Enzo Jels (being sponsored by a local gelatin manufacturer known as Enzo-Pac) at various points before becoming the Sheboygan Red Skins due to their promotion up into the NBL, this would officially be their sixteenth overall season of play as well. For the 1948–49 season, the NBL would have only nine total teams playing there due to the defection of the previous NBL champions in the Minneapolis Lakers alongside the Rochester Royals, the Fort Wayne Zollner Pistons (who rebranded themselves to just the Fort Wayne Pistons this season), and the Indianapolis Kautskys (who rebranded themselves to the Indianapolis Jets) into the newer rivaling Basketball Association of America; the closure of both the Toledo Jeeps and the Flint/Midland Dow A.C.'s due to financial issues; and the additions of the Amateur Athletic Union promoted Denver Nuggets (not related to the present-day Denver Nuggets that previously went by the Denver Rockets), the Detroit Vagabond Kings (who folded operations during this season, but were replaced by the Dayton Rens (who were the all-black New York Renaissance team that held Detroit's previous record and standings for this season) for the rest of the season after December 17, 1948), the Hammond Calumet Buccaneers, and the Waterloo Hawks. As such, the Red Skins represented the Western Division for the fifth and final time in the NBL (seventh and final overall time), with the NBL having four teams in the Eastern Division (which includes the merged records of the Detroit Vagabond Kings and the Dayton Rens) and five teams in the Western Division (Sheboygan's division) this season. Due to the previous resignation of NBL commissioner Ward Lambert for Sheboygan's head coach in their previous two seasons of play, Doxie Moore (despite him being seen as a disliked figure in certain areas in the NBL, including within Sheboygan), the team's head coaching position would be replaced by Ken Suesens through a player-coach position for this season instead.

The Red Skins played their home games at the Sheboygan Municipal Auditorium and Armory. Early on in their season, it looked like Sheboygan would struggle to keep up with the rest of the competition once again, similar to how they had fallen apart by the end of the previous season after letting go of their previous player-coach, Bobby McDermott. However, unlike the previous season, where they faltered their early success to finish with a fifth-place performance in their division, the Red Skins would end up providing various pushes throughout the season (including a notable one near the end of the season, starting with a doubleheader victory they had at home against the newly implemented Dayton Rens on March 13 after previously having multiple games of theirs delayed due to an awful winter snowstorm period during this season and a split finish against the Rens on March 31 to end the season with a 8–2 push) to get them exactly what they needed to qualify for the last NBL Playoffs ever held over the Waterloo Hawks. (While they had a shot at tying with the Tri-Cities Blackhawks during that final night, their loss on that final regular season game they played would ultimately give them a third-place finish for the season instead of a second-place finish.) Because of their failure to overtake first place from their cityside rivals in the Oshkosh All-Stars, the Red Skins would be forced to compete in the Western Division opening round one last time for the final NBL Playoffs ever held, which later led to Sheboygan being swept by the Tri-Cities Blackhawks 2–0 in a best-of-three series, meaning the Red Skins would miss out on having one last chance to compete against the Oshkosh All-Stars in the Western Division Semifinals this season. Following the season's conclusion, former NBL Rookie of the Year winner Mike Todorovich would be named a member of the All-NBL Second Team since he would be a key contributor in helping the Red Skins return to the NBL Playoffs one last time.

On August 3, 1949, a merger between the Basketball Association of America and the National Basketball League (which Sheboygan first played for) was completed to have them become the modern-day National Basketball Association, which saw the Red Skins join the final NBL champion Anderson Duffey Packers (who since rebranded themselves to the Anderson Packers due to the new league not allowing for sponsorships to be a part of any team names), the original Denver Nuggets, the Syracuse Nationals, the Tri-Cities Blackhawks, and the Waterloo Hawks expansion team as the six NBL teams from that final season joining the newly established league alongside the planned Indianapolis Olympians NBL expansion team. (Interestingly enough, another NBL team in the cityside rivaling Oshkosh All-Stars was intended to join those other teams in being a part of the NBL-BAA merger for the NBA, but due to concerns and second-guessing on that team's intended move to Milwaukee, the All-Stars withdrew their chance to join the NBA alongside Sheboygan and the rest of the surviving teams.) After completing their only season in the NBA, the Sheboygan Red Skins soon joined the Waterloo Hawks, the original Denver Nuggets (who would later rebrand themselves as the Denver Frontier Refiners at first), and the previously withdrawn Anderson Packers (who left the NBA weeks before the other three teams did due to pressure involving other big market teams in places like New York, Boston, and Philadelphia alongside the higher costs involved with the newly-formed NBA being too much for them to bare) the day before the 1950 NBA draft was set to begin on April 24, 1950, to create the short-lived rivaling National Professional Basketball League as a failed effort to survive beyond the NBA (as well as failing in their attempt to revive the Oshkosh All-Stars and their personal rivalry with them by extension). Unlike the other teams that helped create the short-lived NPBL, Sheboygan would end up lasting for one more season afterward as an independent team before folding operations entirely for good. Incidentally, the state of Wisconsin would later have the Tri-Cities Blackhawks move to Milwaukee and then shorten their Blackhawks team name down to just the Hawks in order to play as the Milwaukee Hawks from 1951 until 1955 before later having the Milwaukee Bucks join the NBA in 1968 alongside the Phoenix Suns as expansion teams.

== Draft picks ==
The Sheboygan Red Skins would participate in the 1948 NBL draft, which occurred right after the 1948 BAA draft when plans for a joint draft between the National Basketball League and the rivaling Basketball Association of America ultimately fell out when the defending NBL champion Minneapolis Lakers, Rochester Royals, Fort Wayne Zollner Pistons, and Indianapolis Kautskys turned Jets all defected from the NBL to the BAA. However, as of 2026, no records of what the Red Skins' draft picks might have been for the NBL have properly come up, with any information on who those selections might have been being lost to time in the process.

== Roster ==
1948–49 Sheboygan Red Skins roster
Players

Pos.	No.	Player	Height	Weight	DOB	From
G/F		Bob Bolyard	6 ft 0 in (1.83 m)	182 lb (83 kg)	1920–12–04	Toledo
F/C		Bob Brannum	6 ft 5 in (1.96 m)	215 lb (98 kg)	1925–05–28	Michigan State
G/F		Paul Cloyd	6 ft 2 in (1.88 m)	180 lb (82 kg)	1920–06–13	Wisconsin
G/F		Bobby Cook	5 ft 10 in (1.78 m)	155 lb (70 kg)	1923–04–01	Wisconsin
G		Ted Cook	6 ft 0 in (1.83 m)	160 lb (73 kg)	1921–04–15	Tennessee
F/C		Les Deaton	6 ft 4 in (1.93 m)	210 lb (95 kg)	1923–09–23	Simpson
G/F		Boody Gilbertson	6 ft 3 in (1.91 m)	205 lb (93 kg)	1922–07–03	Washington
C		Noble Jorgensen	6 ft 9 in (2.06 m)	228 lb (103 kg)	1925–05–18	Iowa
F/C		Max Morris	6 ft 2 in (1.88 m)	195 lb (88 kg)	1925–03–13	Northwestern
C		Milt Schoon	6 ft 7 in (2.01 m)	230 lb (104 kg)	1922–02–25	Valparaiso
G		Ken Suesens	6 ft 1 in (1.85 m)	175 lb (79 kg)	1916–10–23	Iowa
F/C		Mike Todorovich	6 ft 5 in (1.96 m)	220 lb (100 kg)	1923–06–11	Wyoming
G		Danny Wagner	6 ft 0 in (1.83 m)	170 lb (77 kg)	1922–08–01	Texas
G		Jack Watkins	6 ft 2 in (1.88 m)	180 lb (82 kg)	1923–10–27	Oklahoma

Coaches
Head coach
- Ken Suesens

Legend
- (DP) Unsigned draft pick
- (FA) Free agent
- (S) Suspended
- Injured

Roster

Note: Ted Cook, Les Deaton, Ken Suesens, Mike Todorovich, and Jack Watkins were not on the playoff roster for this season.

== Regular season ==
=== Season standings ===
Pos.	Western Division	Wins	Losses	Win %
1	Oshkosh All-Stars	37	27	.578
2	Tri-Cities Blackhawks	36	28	.563
3	Sheboygan Red Skins	35	29	.547
4	Waterloo Hawks	30	32	.484
5	Denver Nuggets	18	44	.290

=== NBL Schedule ===
Not to be confused with exhibition or other non-NBL scheduled games that did not count towards Sheboygan's official NBL record for this season. An official database created by John Grasso detailing every NBL match possible (outside of two matches that the Kankakee Gallagher Trojans won over the Dayton Metropolitans in 1938) would be released in 2026 showcasing every team's official schedules throughout their time spent in the NBL. As such, these are the official results recorded for the Sheboygan Red Skins during their eleventh and final season in the NBL before moving on into the NBA for their following season of play.

#	Date	Opponent	Score	Record
1	November 4	Denver	67–52	1–0
2	November 6	@ Tri-Cities	64–63	2–0
3	November 7	@ Waterloo	61–64	2–1
4	November 10	Hammond	57–63	2–2
5	November 11	Tri-Cities	48–56	2–3
6	November 12	N Oshkosh	61–59	3–3
7	November 14	@ Syracuse	45–53	3–4
8	November 16	@ Detroit	64–57	4–4
9	November 18	Hammond	51–57	4–5
10	November 20	@ Oshkosh	41–67	4–6
11	November 21	@ Hammond	50–49	5–6
12	November 22	@ Anderson	69–67	6–6
13	November 25	Syracuse	63–65	6–7
14	November 28	@ Denver	53–58	6–8
15	November 29	@ Denver	62–58	7–8
16	December 2	Hammond	63–47	8–8
17	December 9	Denver	52–45	9–8
18	December 11	@ Detroit	80–65	10–8
19	December 12	@ Syracuse	65–77	10–9
20	December 13	@ Anderson	59–68	10–10
21	December 16	Syracuse	67–46	11–10
22	December 19	@ Hammond	75–73	12–10
23	December 23	Waterloo	77–56	13–10
24	December 26	Oshkosh	60–42	14–10
25	December 27	@ Anderson	53–72	14–11
26	January 1	Tri-Cities	64–51	15–11
27	January 2	@ Tri-Cities	54–68	15–12
28	January 5	Waterloo	43–52	15–13
29	January 6	Waterloo	54–51	16–13
30	January 9	@ Syracuse	57–65	16–14
31	January 10	@ Anderson	51–66	16–15
32	January 13	Anderson	54–69	16–16
33	January 16	Oshkosh	67–63	17–16
34	January 17	N Syracuse	66–75	17–17
35	January 20	Hammond	64–54	18–17
36	January 23	Tri-Cities	66–60	19–17
37	January 27	Anderson	63–57	20–17
38	January 29	@ Oshkosh	63–68	20–18
39	January 30	@ Waterloo	46–60	21–19
40	February 3	Oshkosh	61–73	21–20
41	February 6	Anderson	72–71	21–20
42	February 10	Waterloo	78–63	22–20
43	February 13	@ Waterloo	55–54	23–20
44	February 16	@ Hammond	72–69 (OT)	24–20
45	February 17	Hammond	75–73	25–20
46	February 20	Dayton	59–61	25–21
47	February 22	@ Denver	80–82 (2OT)	25–22
48	February 24	@ Denver	62–69	25–23
49	February 27	Oshkosh	70–64	26–23
50	March 3	Waterloo	63–57	27–23
51	March 5	@ Oshkosh	53–64	27–24
52	March 6	@ Tri-Cities	63–80	27–25
53	March 10	Anderson	72–76	27–26
54	March 12	@ Tri-Cities	66–68	27–27
55	March 13 (Game 1)	Dayton	67–52	28–27
56	March 13 (Game 2)	Dayton	52–50	29–27
57	March 17	Tri-Cities	69–61	30–27
58	March 20	Denver	55–40	31–27
59	March 23	N Dayton	60–55	32–27
60	March 24	@ Syracuse	73–79	32–28
61	March 27	Denver	60–53	33–28
62	March 30	Syracuse	91–66	34–28
63	March 31 (Game 1)	Dayton	68–62	35–28
64	March 31 (Game 2)	Dayton	54–61	35–29

== NBL Playoffs ==
=== NBL Western Division Opening Round ===
(3W) Sheboygan Red Skins vs. (2W) Tri-Cities Blackhawks: Tri-Cities win series 2–0

- Game 1: April 2, 1949 @ Moline, Illinois (Tri-Cities): Tri-Cities 75, Sheboygan 60
- Game 2: April 3, 1949 @ Sheboygan: Tri-Cities 59, Sheboygan 51

=== Awards and honors ===
- Second Team All-NBL – Mike Todorovich
- All-Time NBL Team – Mike Todorovich
