= 1948–49 Anderson Duffey Packers season =

NBL professional basketball team season

- NBL champions
- Division champions
- Head coach: Murray Mendenhall
- Arena: Anderson High School Wigwam

Results
- Record: 49–15 (.766)
- Place: Division: 1st (Eastern)
- Playoff finish: NBL champions (Won 3–0 over Oshkosh All-Stars)

The 1948–49 Anderson Duffey Packers season was the Duffey Packers' third year in the United States' National Basketball League (NBL), which was also the twelfth and final year the league existed. However, if you include their only season of independent play as the Anderson Chiefs (which sometimes got their team name expanded out more into being the Chief Anderson Meat Packers at times due to their affiliation with the local meat packing business called Duffey's Incorporated) before joining the NBL, this would also be their fourth overall season of play. Ten teams would officially compete in the NBL for the 1948–49 season, comprising five teams in both the Eastern and Western Divisions, though the Eastern Division would see one team fold operations early on in its season and be replaced by another team almost immediately afterward, with that new team taking on its place and record in the NBL for this season.

The Anderson Duffey Packers played their home games at the Anderson High School Wigwam. The Packers finished in first place in the Eastern Division, with them recording the only NBL games where a team would score over 100 and 110 points in a game during the 1949 year. In what ultimately became the final NBL Playoffs ever played, Anderson ended up receiving an Eastern Division Semifinal Round bye due to the awkward alignment the Eastern Division had this season where the Detroit Vagabond Kings not only folded operations midway through their season, but also got replaced by the Dayton Rens (formerly the famous all-black New York Renaissance) by that time, with the Dayton Rens inheriting Detroit's record to go with the record the Rens had that season for their own games played. For the Eastern Division Finals, which became Anderson's official first round in these playoffs, the Duffey Packers defeated the Syracuse Nationals three games to one (3–1). They then went on to get a 3–0 sweep over the Oshkosh All-Stars in what later turned out to be the final games those All-Stars would ever play as a team as Anderson won their first and only NBL championship while that league still existed properly. Months after the end of what became the final NBL season as a whole, the NBL officially agreed to merge operations with the more upstart Basketball Association of America to become the modern-day National Basketball Association, with the NBA ultimately keeping the history of the BAA around over that of the NBL despite it being the longer-lasting league, though the NBA would also keep every surviving NBL team from the previous season outside of the all-black Dayton Rens, the nearby Hammond Calumet Buccaneers, and the longstanding Oshkosh All-Stars alongside keeping the NBL's planned expansion team in the Indianapolis Olympians (though the final NBL champion Anderson Duffey Packers would have to shorten their team name to the Anderson Packers in order to join the NBA due to the BAA/NBA not allowing for sponsorships to be a part of team names, similar to the Fort Wayne Zollner Pistons shortening their name to the Fort Wayne Pistons the previous season), while the BAA's side also kept every team of theirs outside of the Indianapolis Jets (formerly the NBL's Indianapolis Kautskys) and the Providence Steamrollers for the merger.

Players Frank Brian (First Team), Bill Closs (Second), and Boag Johnson (Second) earned All-NBL honors.

== Draft picks ==
The Anderson Duffey Packers would participate in the 1948 NBL draft, which occurred right after the 1948 BAA draft when plans for a joint draft between the National Basketball League and the rivaling Basketball Association of America ultimately fell out when the defending NBL champion Minneapolis Lakers, Rochester Royals, Fort Wayne Zollner Pistons, and Indianapolis Kautskys turned Jets all defected from the NBL to the BAA. However, as of 2026, no records of what the Duffey Packers' draft picks might have been for the NBL have properly come up, with any information on who those selections might have been being lost to time in the process.

== Roster ==
1948–49 Anderson Duffey Packers roster
Players

Pos.	No.	Player	Height	Weight	DOB	From
G	8	Frank Brian	6 ft 1 in (1.85 m)	180 lb (82 kg)	1923–05–01	LSU
G/F	11	Bill Closs	6 ft 5 in (1.96 m)	195 lb (88 kg)	1922–01–08	Rice
F	5	Dillard Crocker	6 ft 4 in (1.93 m)	205 lb (93 kg)	1925–01–19	Western Michigan
G/F	9	Frank Gates	6 ft 0 in (1.83 m)	160 lb (73 kg)	1920–04–12	Sam Houston State
G/F	6	John Hargis	6 ft 2 in (1.88 m)	180 lb (82 kg)	1920–08–20	Texas
G	4	Boag Johnson	5 ft 11 in (1.80 m)	170 lb (77 kg)	1921–12–06	Huntington
F/C	14	Milo Komenich	6 ft 7 in (2.01 m)	212 lb (96 kg)	1920–06–22	Wyoming
G	3	Murray Mendenhall Jr.	5 ft 9 in (1.75 m)	155 lb (70 kg)	1925–10–22	Indiana
F	7	Howie Schultz	6 ft 6 in (1.98 m)	200 lb (91 kg)	1922–07–03	Hamline
G	10	Ed Stanczak	6 ft 1 in (1.85 m)	185 lb (84 kg)	1921–08–15	Central HS (IN)
F		Jack Walton	6 ft 2 in (1.88 m)	190 lb (86 kg)	1926–05–19	East Union HS (IN)

Coaches
Head coach
- Murray Mendenhall

Legend
- (DP) Unsigned draft pick
- (FA) Free agent
- (S) Suspended
- Injured

Roster

Note: Jack Walton was not on the playoffs roster.

== Regular season ==
=== Season standings ===
Pos.	Eastern Division	Wins	Losses	Win %
1	Anderson Duffey Packers	49	15	.766
2	Syracuse Nationals	40	23	.635
3	Hammond Calumet Buccaneers	21	41	.339
4	Dayton Rens^{‡}	14	26	.350
5	Detroit Vagabond Kings^{‡}	2	17	.105
^{‡} Dayton replaced Detroit, who disbanded during the season, and assumed Detroit's record in the standings for the season. Their combined record was 16–43.

=== NBL Schedule ===
Not to be confused with exhibition or other non-NBL scheduled games that did not count towards Anderson's official NBL record for this season. An official database created by John Grasso detailing every NBL match possible (outside of two matches that the Kankakee Gallagher Trojans won over the Dayton Metropolitans in 1938) would be released in 2026 showcasing every team's official schedules throughout their time spent in the NBL. As such, these are the official results recorded for the Anderson Duffey Packers during their third and final season in the NBL before moving on into the NBA for their upcoming season of play.

#	Date	Opponent	Score	Record
1	November 1	Detroit	89–59	1–0
2	November 6	Denver	82–52	2–0
3	November 11	@ Syracuse	62–65	2–1
4	November 13	@ Oshkosh	44–51	2–2
5	November 14	@ Hammond	57–58 (OT)	2–3
6	November 15	@ Tri-Cities	64–57	3–3
7	November 21	@ Syracuse	60–66	3–4
8	November 22	Sheboygan	67–69	3–5
9	November 27	Hammond	86–60	4–5
10	November 29	Syracuse	65–59	5–5
11	November 30	N Oshkosh	65–59	6–5
12	December 1	N Detroit	76–62	7–5
13	December 2	Detroit	86–60	8–5
14	December 6	Denver	72–57	9–5
15	December 7	@ Tri-Cities	78–76	10–5
16	December 9	Waterloo	71–59	11–5
17	December 13	Sheboygan	68–59	12–5
18	December 16	N Detroit	92–84	13–5
19	December 19	@ Dayton	83–61	14–5
20	December 20	Tri-Cities	58–61	14–6
21	December 22	@ Waterloo	45–50	14–7
22	December 23	Oshkosh	79–63	15–7
23	December 26	@ Syracuse	73–57	16–7
24	December 27	Sheboygan	72–53	17–7
25	December 29	@ Waterloo	51–50	18–7
26	December 30	Waterloo	80–68	19–7
27	January 3	Oshkosh	59–58	20–7
28	January 4	Hammond	78–72	21–7
29	January 9	@ Tri-Cities	71–77	21–8
30	January 10	Sheboygan	66–51	22–8
31	January 12	@ Waterloo	40–46	22–9
32	January 13	@ Sheboygan	69–54	23–9
33	January 17	@ Denver	118–76	24–9
34	January 19	@ Hammond	87–78	25–9
35	January 20	@ Tri-Cities	76–74	26–9
36	January 24	Denver	76–65	27–9
37	January 27	@ Sheboygan	57–63	27–10
38	January 31	Hammond	74–61	28–10
39	February 2	@ Denver	61–60	29–10
40	February 4	@ Denver	71–49	30–10
41	February 6	@ Sheboygan	71–72	30–11
42	February 7	Waterloo	74–63	31–11
43	February 10	Hammond	73–62	32–11
44	February 13	@ Dayton	54–51	33–11
45	February 14	Syracuse	71–61	34–11
46	February 16	N Dayton	76–68	35–11
47	February 17	Tri-Cities	97–71	36–11
48	February 19	@ Oshkosh	55–52	37–11
49	February 20	@ Waterloo	58–54	38–11
50	February 24	@ Tri-Cities	73–75 (OT)	38–12
51	February 28	Syracuse	72–69	39–12
52	March 1	N Oshkosh	71–65	40–12
53	March 3	@ Denver	71–62	41–12
54	March 5	@ Denver	73–76 (OT)	41–13
55	March 7	Waterloo	69–53	42–13
56	March 10	@ Sheboygan	76–72	43–13
57	March 12	@ Oshkosh	74–67 (OT)	44–13
58	March 14	Syracuse	82–75	45–13
59	March 17	Hammond	98–68	46–13
60	March 21	Dayton	74–69	47–13
61	March 23	@ Hammond	58–61	47–14
62	March 26	Tri-Cities	102–75	48–14
63	March 27	@ Syracuse	60–71	48–15
64	March 29	Oshkosh	94–62	49–15

== NBL Playoffs ==
=== NBL Eastern Division Opening Round ===
Received opening round bye.

=== NBL Eastern Division Semifinals ===
(1E) Anderson Duffey Packers vs. (2E) Syracuse Nationals: Anderson wins series 3–1

- Game 1 @ Syracuse: Anderson 89, Syracuse 74
- Game 2 @ Syracuse: Syracuse 80, Anderson 62
- Game 3 @ Anderson: Anderson 76, Syracuse 59
- Game 4 @ Anderson: Anderson 90, Syracuse 84

=== NBL Championship ===
(1E) Anderson Duffey Packers vs. (1W) Oshkosh All-Stars: Anderson wins series 3–0

- Game 1 @ Oshkosh: Anderson 74, Oshkosh 70
- Game 2 @ Oshkosh: Anderson 72, Oshkosh 70
- Game 3 @ Anderson: Anderson 88, Oshkosh 64

== Awards and honors ==
- First Team All-NBL – Frank Brian
- Second Team All-NBL – Bill Closs and Boag Johnson
