= 1948–49 Tri-Cities Blackhawks season =

NBL professional basketball team season

- Head coach: Bobby McDermott (player-coach; 24–21); Roger Potter (12–7)
- Arena: Wharton Field House

Results
- Record: 36–28 (.563)
- Place: Division: 2nd (Western)
- Playoff finish: Lost Western Division Semifinals to the All-Stars, 1–3
- Stats at Basketball Reference

The 1948–49 Tri-Cities Blackhawks season was the team's third season of play (their second full season of play while going under the Tri-Cities Blackhawks name after previously going under the Buffalo Bisons in 1946) and their last season of play in the National Basketball League (NBL) before its merger with the Basketball Association of America (BAA). Led by the league's final MVP Don Otten, the Blackhawks experienced their first winning season in team history, as well as their only winning season while in the NBL. The Tri-Cities would sweep the Sheboygan Red Skins 2–0 in the Western Division opening round, but lost to the Oshkosh All-Stars 3–1 in the Western Division semifinal round of the final NBL Playoffs ever held. Months after the end of what became the final NBL season as a whole, the NBL officially agreed to merge operations with the more upstart Basketball Association of America to become the modern-day National Basketball Association, with the NBA ultimately keeping the history of the BAA around over that of the NBL despite it being the longer-lasting league, though the NBA would also keep every surviving NBL team from the previous season outside of the Dayton Rens, Hammond Calumet Buccaneers, and Oshkosh All-Stars (with Oshkosh being a last-minute subtraction on their end) alongside keeping the NBL's planned expansion team in the Indianapolis Olympians, while the BAA side also kept every team of theirs outside of the Indianapolis Jets (formerly the NBL's Indianapolis Kautskys) and the Providence Steamrollers for the merger. However, the Blackhawks and the Syracuse Nationals would become the only NBL teams in the NBL side of things by 1949 to survive to the present day, albeit as the Atlanta Hawks and Philadelphia 76ers respectively.

== Draft picks ==
The Tri-Cities Blackhawks would participate in the 1948 NBL draft, which occurred right after the 1948 BAA draft when plans for a joint draft between the National Basketball League and the rivaling Basketball Association of America ultimately fell out when the defending NBL champion Minneapolis Lakers, Rochester Royals, Fort Wayne Zollner Pistons, and Indianapolis Kautskys turned Jets all defected from the NBL to the BAA. However, as of 2026, no records of what the Blackhawks' draft picks might have been for the NBL have properly come up, with any information on who those selections might have been being lost to time in the process.

== Roster ==
1948–49 Tri-Cities Blackhawks roster
Players

Pos.	No.	Player	Height	Weight	DOB	From
F/C	–	Joe Camic	6 ft 4 in (1.93 m)	195 lb (88 kg)	1922-11-18	Duquesne
G/F	–	Dee Gibson	5 ft 11 in (1.80 m)	175 lb (79 kg)	1923-08-25	Bradley
F/C	–	Hoot Gibson	6 ft 5 in (1.96 m)	198 lb (90 kg)	1921-12-05	Creighton (Minnesota)
G/F	–	Luther Harris	6 ft 3 in (1.91 m)	195 lb (88 kg)	1923-08-27	East Alton–Wood River HS (IL)
G	–	Billy Hassett	5 ft 11 in (1.80 m)	185 lb (84 kg)	1921-10-21	Notre Dame
F	–	Earl Hawkins	6 ft 4 in (1.93 m)	225 lb (102 kg)	1920-09-23	Auburn
F/C	–	Ed Lewinski	6 ft 4 in (1.93 m)	210 lb (95 kg)	1918-09-10	Bowen HS (IL)
F/C	–	Bobby Lowther	6 ft 5 in (1.96 m)	190 lb (86 kg)	1923-12-14	LSU
G	–	Bobby McDermott	6 ft 0 in (1.83 m)	185 lb (84 kg)	1914-01-07	Flushing HS (NY)
C	–	Don Otten	6 ft 10 in (2.08 m)	240 lb (109 kg)	1921-04-18	Bowling Green
F/C	–	George Ratkovicz	6 ft 6 in (1.98 m)	220 lb (100 kg)	1922-11-13	Lindblom HS (IL)
F/C	–	Don Ray	6 ft 5 in (1.96 m)	190 lb (86 kg)	1921-07-08	Western Kentucky
G/F	–	Whitey Von Nieda	6 ft 1 in (1.85 m)	170 lb (77 kg)	1922-06-19	Penn State
G	–	Murray Wier	5 ft 9 in (1.75 m)	155 lb (70 kg)	1926-12-12	Iowa

Coaches
Head coach
- Bobby McDermott
- Roger Potter

Legend
- (DP) Unsigned draft pick
- (FA) Free agent
- (S) Suspended
- Injured

Roster

Note: Joe Camic, Earl Hawkins, Ed Lewinski, and player-coach Bobby McDermott were not on the playoff roster for one reason or another.

== Season standings ==
=== Western Division standings ===
Pos.	Western Division	Wins	Losses	Win %
1	Oshkosh All-Stars	37	27	.578
2	Tri-Cities Blackhawks	36	28	.563
3	Sheboygan Red Skins	35	29	.547
4	Waterloo Hawks	30	32	.484
5	Denver Nuggets	18	44	.290

=== NBL Schedule ===
Not to be confused with exhibition or other non-NBL scheduled games that did not count towards the Tri-Cities' official NBL record for this season. An official database created by John Grasso detailing every NBL match possible (outside of two matches that the Kankakee Gallagher Trojans won over the Dayton Metropolitans in 1938) would be released in 2026 showcasing every team's official schedules throughout their time spent in the NBL. As such, these are the official results recorded for the Tri-Cities Blackhawks in their third and final season in the NBL (second and final full season under the Tri-Cities Blackhawks name specifically following the new Buffalo Bisons team moving from Buffalo, New York to Moline, Illinois near the end of 1946, with the Blackhawks officially playing their NBL games from their inaugural (NBL) season at the start of 1947).

#	Date	Opponent	Score	Record
1	November 6	Sheboygan	63–64	0–1
2	November 11	@ Sheboygan	56–48	1–1
3	November 13	Denver	70–58	2–1
4	November 15	@ Anderson	57–64	2–2
5	November 16	Waterloo	67–63	3–2
6	November 17	@ Syracuse	56–58	3–3
7	November 20	Hammond	93–73	4–3
8	November 22	@ Denver	54–49	5–3
9	November 24	@ Denver	51–60	5–4
10	November 27	Detroit	92–73	6–4
11	November 28	@ Waterloo	59–61	6–5
12	December 2	Denver	80–76	7–5
13	December 4	Oshkosh	47–57	7–6
14	December 5	@ Hammond	58–52	8–6
15	December 7	Anderson	76–78	8–7
16	December 11	Denver	82–62	9–7
17	December 12	@ Hammond	70–58	10–7
18	December 16	Oshkosh	73–64	11–7
19	December 19	Syracuse	67–66	12–7
20	December 20	@ Anderson	61–58	13–7
21	December 23	Hammond	63–64	13–8
22	December 26	Dayton	70–49	14–8
23	December 28	N Syracuse	74–87	14–9
24	December 30	@ Syracuse	74–83	14–10
25	January 1	@ Sheboygan	51–64	14–11
26	January 2	Sheboygan	68–54	15–11
27	January 5	@ Denver	44–50	15–12
28	January 7	@ Denver	69–58	16–12
29	January 9	Anderson	77–71	17–12
30	January 13	Waterloo	72–68	18–12
31	January 16	Syracuse	83–72	19–12
32	January 19	@ Waterloo	46–42	20–12
33	January 20	Anderson	74–76	20–13
34	January 22	@ Oshkosh	53–64	20–14
35	January 23	@ Sheboygan	60–66	20–15
36	January 25	Hammond	75–51	21–15
37	January 27	@ Syracuse	55–58	21–16
38	January 30	Oshkosh	92–69	22–16
39	February 2	Waterloo	59–70	22–17
40	February 3	Waterloo	56–63	22–18
41	February 5	@ Oshkosh	65–63	23–18
42	February 6	Hammond	53–49	24–18
43	February 7	N Dayton	49–51	24–19
44	February 10	Dayton	54–61	24–20
45	February 13	Oshkosh	53–54	24–21
46	February 16	Waterloo	63–58	25–21
47	February 17	@ Anderson	71–97	25–22
48	February 20	Syracuse	75–66	26–22
49	February 21	N Dayton	74–54	27–22
50	February 24	Anderson	75–73 (OT)	28–22
51	February 26	@ Oshkosh	54–58	28–23
52	February 27	Syracuse	51–40	29–23
53	March 3	Dayton	58–60	29–24
54	March 6	Sheboygan	80–63	30–24
55	March 9	Dayton	65–56	31–24
56	March 10	N Dayton	68–45	32–24
57	March 12	Sheboygan	68–66	33–24
58	March 13	@ Waterloo	50–49	34–24
59	March 16	@ Hammond	57–60	34–25
60	March 17	@ Sheboygan	61–69	34–26
61	March 20	Oshkosh	78–61	35–26
62	March 24	Denver	59–57	36–26
63	March 26	@ Anderson	75–102	36–27
64	March 27	Hammond	62–63	36–28

== NBL Playoffs ==
=== NBL Western Division Opening Round ===
(2W) Tri-Cities Blackhawks vs. (3W) Sheboygan Red Skins: Tri-Cities wins series 2–0

- Game 1: April 2, 1949 @ Moline, Illinois (Tri-Cities): Tri-Cities 75, Sheboygan 60
- Game 2: April 3, 1949 @ Sheboygan: Tri-Cities 59, Sheboygan 51

=== NBL Western Division Semifinals ===
(2W) Tri-Cities Blackhawks vs. (1W) Oshkosh All-Stars: Oshkosh wins series 3–1

- Game 1: April 6, 1949 @ Oshkosh: Oshkosh 68, Tri-Cities 66
- Game 2: April 9, 1949 @ Oshkosh: Oshkosh 73, Tri-Cities 59
- Game 3: April 10, 1949 @ Moline, Illinois (Tri-Cities): Tri-Cities 70, Oshkosh 64
- Game 4: April 12, 1949 @ Moline, Illinois (Tri-Cities): Oshkosh 70, Tri-Cities 69

== Awards and records ==
- Don Otten – MVP, All-NBL First Team
- Whitey Von Nieda – All-NBL Second Team
- Hoot Gibson – All-NBL Second Team
