= Rookie Brown =

American basketball player

Personal information
- Born: February 15, 1925
- Died: May 22, 1971 (aged 46) Neptune, New Jersey, U.S.
- Listed height: 6 ft 4 in (1.93 m)
- Listed weight: 190 lb (86 kg)

Career information
- High school: Benjamin Franklin (Philadelphia, Pennsylvania)
- College: Virginia Union; Howard
- Position: Forward / center

Career history
- 1949: Dayton Rens
- 19??–19??: Harlem Globetrotters

William "Rookie" Brown (February 15, 1925 – May 22, 1971) was an American professional basketball player in the United States' National Basketball League (NBL). He played for the Dayton Rens in 10 games during the 1948–49 season. He played collegiately at Virginia Union University and Howard University.

Brown died in Neptune, New Jersey at age 46 from cancer.
