= Longie Powell =

American basketball player

Personal information
- Born: February 14, 1919 Mississippi, U.S.
- Died: June 27, 1969 (aged 50) Gary, Indiana, U.S.
- Listed height: 6 ft 4 in (1.93 m)

Career information
- High school: Friedrich Froebel (Gary, Indiana)
- Playing career: 1942–1949
- Position: Power forward / center

Career history
- 1942–1943: Harlem Globetrotters
- 1946–1947: New York Renaissance
- 1947–1948: Chicago Colored Collegians
- 1949: Dayton Rens

Robert V. "Longie" Powell (February 14, 1919 – June 27, 1969) was an American professional basketball player. He played for the Dayton Rens in the National Basketball League during the 1948–49 season and averaged 5.0 points per game. He also played for the Harlem Globetrotters, New York Renaissance, and the Chicago Colored Collegians.
