= Tom Sealy =

American basketball player

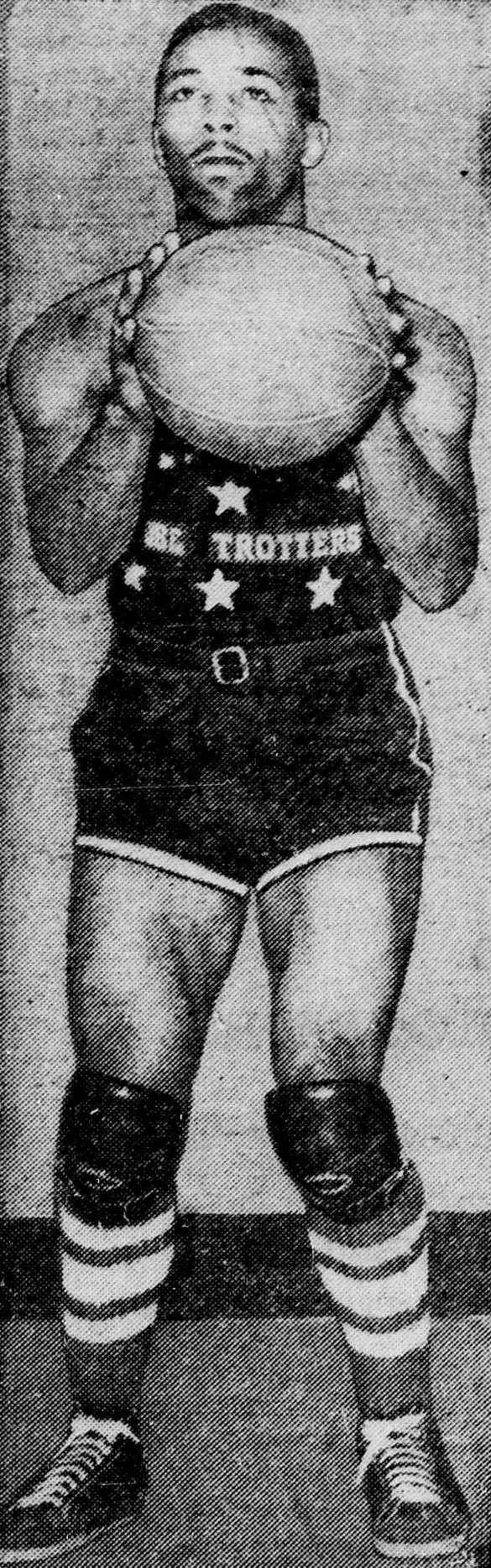
- Sealy, circa 1951

Personal information
- Born: January 31, 1921 Philadelphia, Pennsylvania, U.S.
- Died: November 29, 2000 (aged 79) Rome, New York, U.S.
- Listed height: 6 ft 2 in (1.88 m)
- Listed weight: 190 lb (86 kg)

Career information
- College: Brooklyn
- Playing career: 1940–1953
- Position: Guard

Career history
- 1940–1941: Washington Bruins
- 1941–1942: Saratoga Harlem Yankees
- 1942–1943: New York Rens
- 1945–1946: Chicago Brown Bombers
- 1945–1947: Harlem Globetrotters
- 1947–1950: New York Rens
- 1948–1949: Dayton Rens
- 1949–1950: Hartford Hurricane
- 1952–1953: Harlem Globetrotters

Thomas Fitz Sealy (February 23, 1921 – November 29, 2000) was an American professional basketball player. He was a member of the Harlem Globetrotters. He also played for the Dayton Rens of the National Basketball League.

Sealy was featured in the film Tommy and the Basketball. He was an active player in 1946 for the Harlem Globetrotters. Sealy was 6'2" and played for Brooklyn College. He played all 40 games for the Rens in the 1948–49 season, finishing the season as their 5th leading scorer with 260 points (6.5 points per game). He died in November 2000.
