= Bill Farrow =

American basketball player

Personal information
- Born: June 15, 1918 Chicago, Illinois
- Died: September 3, 2003 (aged 85) Chicago, Illinois
- Listed height: 6 ft 4 in (1.93 m)
- Listed weight: 200 lb (91 kg)

Career information
- College: Kentucky State (1939–1940)
- Position: Center

Career history
- 1945–1946: Chicago Brown Bombers
- 1946: Chicago Collegians
- 1946–1947: Youngstown Bears
- 1949: Dayton Rens

William M. Farrow Jr. (June 15, 1918 – September 3, 2003) was an American professional basketball player. He played in the National Basketball League for the Youngstown Bears (32 games in 1946–47) and Dayton Rens (three games in 1948–49), where he averaged 5.3 points per game for his career.
