= Red Pryor =

American basketball player

Personal information
- Born: June 2, 1926 Chicago, Illinois, U.S.
- Died: December 1, 2005 (aged 79) Chicago, Illinois, U.S.
- Listed height: 6 ft 3 in (1.91 m)
- Listed weight: 180 lb (82 kg)

Career information
- High school: DuSable (Chicago, Illinois)
- College: DePaul (1945–1946)
- Position: Shooting guard / small forward

Career history
- 1946–1947: Cleveland Fifas
- 1947–1948: Chicago Colored Collegians
- 1948: Chicago Crusaders
- 1949: Dayton Rens

Leroy "Red" Pryor (June 2, 1926 – December 1, 2005) was an American professional basketball player. He played for the Dayton Rens in the National Basketball League during the latter part of the 1948–49 season and averaged 1.2 points per game.
