= Vic Krafft =

American basketball player

Personal information
- Born: June 3, 1919 Chicago, Illinois
- Died: November 21, 1991 (aged 72)
- Listed height: 6 ft 3 in (1.91 m)
- Listed weight: 195 lb (88 kg)

Career information
- College: Kennedy–King
- Playing career: 1942–1949
- Position: Guard

Career history
- 1942–1943: Harlem Globetrotters
- 1946–1947: Chicago Monarchs
- 1946–1952: Chicago Colored Collegians
- 1949: Dayton Rens

Victor Edmondson Krafft (June 3, 1919 – November 21, 1991) was an American professional basketball player. He played for the Dayton Rens in the National Basketball League for three games during the 1948–49 season and averaged 2.0 points per game.
