= Lon Darling =

American basketball coach (1902–1951)

Personal information
- Born: June 25, 1902 Oshkosh, Wisconsin, U.S.
- Died: April 19, 1951 (aged 48) Oshkosh, Wisconsin, U.S.

Career history

Coaching
- 1929–1936, 1941–1949: Oshkosh All-Stars

Career highlights
- As coach: 2× NBL Coach of the Year (1942, 1947); NBL champion (1942); 3× NBL division champion (1942, 1947, 1949); WPBT champion (1942)

Alonzo Lewis "Lon" Darling (June 25, 1902 – April 19, 1951) was an early influencer in American professional basketball, having created the barnstorming team the Oshkosh All-Stars, is credited with being the organizer of the National Basketball League (NBL), and was a two-time NBL Coach of the Year. The Oshkosh All-Stars saw great success over their twelve-year tenure in the NBL, winning the Western Division six times and the league championship twice, in 1941 and 1942. The All-Stars also won the World Professional Basketball Tournament in 1942.

== National Basketball League ==
Formation

At age 20, Darling began work as a seed distributor, first with the Oshkosh Seed Company, then as an Oshkosh-area distributor for the Milwaukee-based firm Hunkel Seed Co. Since the seed work was seasonal, Darling sought work during its off-season. His solution to this was to create a new professional basketball team, the Oshkosh All-Stars, in 1929. According to the Oshkosh Public Museum, "Barring a down period during the Great Depression, manager/coach Darling's All-Stars met great success and in 1937, he founded the National Basketball League, a precursor to the current-day NBA, in which the All-Stars were included alongside former members of a regional professional league, for formally-structured league play."

Disbanding

Despite the success that Darling established with the Oshkosh All-Stars and the NBL, he is also cited as a key figure in the NBL's disbanding after the 1948–49 season. Bitter that the All-Stars were not invited to join the rival league of the day—the Basketball Association of America, whose teams enjoyed bigger arenas and more funding—Darling accused the Minneapolis Lakers of being "trouble makers" by switching leagues and incited a feud. Darling had been coaching the All-Stars but resigned prior to the conclusion of the 1948–49 season, causing players Gene Englund and Eddie Riska to become interim head coaches. Due to insufficient funding, the team disbanded after 1948–49, which trickled to the remaining teams and thus caused the whole league to disband shortly thereafter. The Oshkosh All-Stars were one of few teams to not have been absorbed by the BAA upon the NBL's dissolution.

== Personal ==
Darling was born on June 25, 1902, in Oshkosh, Wisconsin. He attended Ripon College. Lon's brother was Bernard "Boob" Darling, a professional football player for the Green Bay Packers who spent his entire five-year career with the organization. Boob is a member of the Green Bay Packers Hall of Fame.

On April 19, 1951, Darling died at age 48 in his lifelong hometown of Oshkosh. The cause of death was a myocardial infarction (heart attack).

== Head coaching record ==
The below season records reflect Darling's tenure as head coach when the Oshkosh All-Stars were in the NBL. Their years spent barnstorming are not counted toward official coaching records.

Legend
Regular season	G	Games coached	W	Games won	L	Games lost	W–L %	Win–loss %
Playoffs	PG	Playoff games	PW	Playoff wins	PL	Playoff losses	PW–L %	Playoff win–loss %

Team	Year	G	W	L	W–L%	Finish	PG	PW	PL	PW–L%	Result
Oshkosh	1941–42	24	20	4	.833	1st	5	4	1	.800	Won NBL Championship
Oshkosh	1942–43	23	11	12	.478	3rd	2	0	2	.000	Lost in Semifinals
Oshkosh	1943–44	22	7	15	.318	3rd	3	1	2	.333	Lost in Semifinals
Oshkosh	1944–45	30	12	18	.400	3rd in Western	—	—	—	—	Missed playoffs
Oshkosh	1945–46	34	19	15	.559	2nd in Western	5	2	3	.400	Lost in Division Semifinals
Oshkosh	1946–47	44	28	16	.636	1st in Western	7	3	4	.429	Lost in Division Semifinals
Oshkosh	1947–48	60	29	31	.483	3rd in Western	4	1	3	.250	Lost in Division Semifinals
Oshkosh	1948–49	60	34	26	.567	1st in Western	N/A (Note: Darling resigned prior to the playoffs. Players Gene Englund and Eddie Riska coached the team to a 3–4 record in the postseason. They won the Western Division Finals 3–1 over the Tri-Cities Blackhawks, then lost the NBL Championship series 0–3 to the Anderson Duffey Packers.)	N/A	N/A	N/A	N/A
Total		297	160	137	.539		26	11	15	.423	
