= Leonard Alterman =

American basketball player

Leonardo Alterman
Personal information
- Born: March 8, 1922 Denver, Colorado
- Died: February 6, 2009 (aged 86) Denver, Colorado
- Listed height: 6 ft 3 in (1.91 m)
- Listed weight: 185 lb (84 kg)

Career information
- High school: North (Denver, Colorado)
- College: Denver (1941–1943, 1947–1948)
- Position: Guard

Career history
- 1942–1943: Denver Legions
- 1948–1949: Denver Nuggets

Leonard "Chink" Alterman (March 8, 1922 – February 6, 2009) was an American professional basketball player. He played for the Denver Nuggets in the National Basketball League and averaged 3.9 points per game. He served in the United States Army during World War II.
