= Kayo Wnorowski =

American basketball player (1921–1998)

Personal information
- Born: October 4, 1921 Schenectady, New York, U.S.
- Died: April 15, 1998 (aged 76)
- Listed height: 6 ft 0 in (1.83 m)
- Listed weight: 215 lb (98 kg)

Career information
- High school: Mount Pleasant (Schenectady, New York)
- College: Siena (1942–1943)
- Position: Guard

Career history
- 1946–1949: Schenectady Comets
- 1948–1949: Denver Nuggets

Casmier Valentine "Kayo" Wnorowski (October 4, 1921 – April 15, 1998) was an American professional basketball player. He played for the Denver Nuggets in the National Basketball League during the 1948–49 season and averaged 1.6 points per game.
