= Ed Mills =

American basketball player (1922–2002)

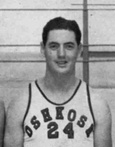

Personal information
- Born: February 23, 1922 Milwaukee, Wisconsin, U.S.
- Died: September 27, 2002 (aged 80) Milwaukee, Wisconsin, U.S.
- Listed height: 6 ft 8 in (2.03 m)
- Listed weight: 225 lb (102 kg)

Career information
- College: Wisconsin (1946–1948)
- BAA draft: 1948: 6th round
- Drafted by: Chicago Stags
- Playing career: 1948–1950
- Position: Center

Career history
- 1948–1949: Oshkosh All-Stars
- 1949: Milwaukee Bright Spots
- 1949–1950: Racine Knights
- Stats at Basketball Reference

Edward Russell Mills (February 23, 1922 – September 27, 2002) was an American professional basketball player. He played in the National Basketball League for the Oshkosh All-Stars and averaged 2.9 points per game.
