= Jack Walton (basketball) =

American basketball player (1926–1952)

Personal information
- Born: May 19, 1926 Newton Falls, Ohio, U.S.
- Died: December 17, 1952 (aged 26) Fort Wayne, Indiana, U.S.
- Listed height: 6 ft 2 in (1.88 m)
- Listed weight: 190 lb (86 kg)

Career information
- High school: East Union (East Union, Indiana)
- Playing career: 1945–1951
- Position: Forward

Career history
- 1945–1946: Fort Wayne
- 1946–1949: House of David
- 1948–1949: Anderson Duffey Packers
- 1950–1951: Anderson Packers

Jack D. Walton (May 19, 1926 – December 17, 1952) was an American professional basketball player. He played in the National Basketball League for the Anderson Duffey Packers during the 1948–49 season and averaged 1.8 points per game. He also competed in independent leagues.

In 1949, Walton took a job with a construction company. Three years later, he was accidentally killed at a construction site when a tree being uprooted by a bulldozer fell on him.
