= 1948–49 Syracuse Nationals season =

NBL professional basketball team season

- Head coach: Al Cervi (player-coach)
- President: Danny Biasone
- General manager: George Mingin
- Owners: Danny Biasone (majority); George Mingin (minority)
- Arena: West Jefferson Street Armory

Results
- Record: 40–23 (.635)
- Place: Division: 2nd (Eastern)
- Playoff finish: Lost Eastern Division Semifinals to the Anderson Duffey Packers, 1–3
- Stats at Basketball Reference

The 1948–49 Syracuse Nationals season was the third season of the franchise in the National Basketball League, which ended up becoming the 12th and final season of that particular league's existence. The Nationals finished this season with their first winning season in franchise history, as well as their only winning season while in the NBL, which made this their best NBL season by default. Syracuse would sweep the Hammond Calumet Buccaneers 2–0 in the opening round, but lost to the eventual champion Anderson Duffey Packers 3–1 in the semifinal round of the final NBL Playoffs ever held. Months after the end of what became the final NBL season as a whole, the NBL officially agreed to merge operations with the more upstart Basketball Association of America to become the modern-day National Basketball Association, with the NBA ultimately keeping the history of the BAA around over that of the NBL despite it being the longer-lasting league, though the NBA would also keep every surviving NBL team from the previous season outside of the Dayton Rens, Hammond Calumet Buccaneers, and Oshkosh All-Stars (with Oshkosh being a last-minute subtraction on their end) alongside keeping the NBL's planned expansion team in the Indianapolis Olympians, while the BAA side also kept every team of theirs outside of the Indianapolis Jets (formerly the NBL's Indianapolis Kautskys) and the Providence Steamrollers for the merger. However, the Nationals and the Tri-Cities Blackhawks would become the only NBL teams in the NBL side of things by 1949 to survive to the present day, albeit as the Philadelphia 76ers and Atlanta Hawks respectively.

== Draft picks ==
The Syracuse Nationals would participate in the 1948 NBL draft, which occurred right after the 1948 BAA draft when plans for a joint draft between the National Basketball League and the rivaling Basketball Association of America ultimately fell out when the defending NBL champion Minneapolis Lakers, Rochester Royals, Fort Wayne Zollner Pistons, and Indianapolis Kautskys turned Jets all defected from the NBL to the BAA. However, as of 2026, no records of what the Nationals' draft picks might have been for the NBL have properly come up, with any information on who those selections might have been being lost to time in the process.

== Roster ==
1948–49 Syracuse Nationals roster
Players

Pos.	No.	Player	Height	Weight	DOB	From
G/F		Bob Calihan	6 ft 3 in (1.91 m)	200 lb (91 kg)	1918-08-02	Detroit Mercy
G/F		Al Cervi	5 ft 11 in (1.80 m)	170 lb (77 kg)	1917-02-12	East HS (NY)
G/F		John Chaney	6 ft 3 in (1.91 m)	185 lb (84 kg)	1920-02-29	LSU
G/F		Billy Gabor	5 ft 11 in (1.80 m)	170 lb (77 kg)	1922-05-13	Syracuse
G/F		Jim Homer	6 ft 5 in (1.96 m)	220 lb (100 kg)	1921-12-05	Alabama
G/F		Johnny Macknowski	6 ft 0 in (1.83 m)	180 lb (82 kg)	1923-01-07	Seton Hall
F		Hank O'Keeffe	6 ft 3 in (1.91 m)	195 lb (88 kg)	1923-12-12	Canisius
C		Ed Peterson	6 ft 9 in (2.06 m)	220 lb (100 kg)	1924-06-27	Cornell
G	50	Jerry Rizzo	5 ft 7 in (1.70 m)	150 lb (68 kg)	1919-04-21	Fordham
F/C		Dolph Schayes	6 ft 7 in (2.01 m)	195 lb (88 kg)	1928-05-19	NYU
G/F		Paul Seymour	6 ft 1 in (1.85 m)	180 lb (82 kg)	1928-01-30	Toledo
F		Paul Yesawich	6 ft 2 in (1.88 m)	190 lb (86 kg)	1923-11-27	Niagara

Coaches
Head coach

Al Cervi

Legend
- (DP) Unsigned draft pick
- (FA) Free agent
- (S) Suspended
- Injured

Roster

Note: Jerry Rizzo was not on the playoff roster due to the season-long suspension that was implemented following a road match against the original Denver Nuggets team (with Paul Yesawich probably also being the same way for a different reason as well).

== Season standings ==
=== Eastern Division standings ===
Pos.	Eastern Division	Wins	Losses	Win %
1	Anderson Duffey Packers	49	15	.766
2	Syracuse Nationals	40	23	.635
3	Hammond Calumet Buccaneers	21	41	.339
4	Dayton Rens^{‡}	14	26	.350
5	Detroit Vagabond Kings^{‡}	2	17	.105
^{‡} Dayton replaced Detroit, who disbanded during the season, and assumed Detroit's record in the standings for the season. Their combined record was 16–43.

=== NBL Schedule ===
Not to be confused with exhibition or other non-NBL scheduled games that did not count towards Syracuse's official NBL record for this season. An official database created by John Grasso detailing every NBL match possible (outside of two matches that the Kankakee Gallagher Trojans won over the Dayton Metropolitans in 1938) would be released in 2026 showcasing every team's official schedules throughout their time spent in the NBL. As such, these are the official results recorded for the Syracuse Nationals during their third and final season in the NBL before moving on into the NBA.

#	Date	Opponent	Score	Record
1	November 7	Denver	54–40	1–0
2	November 11	Anderson	65–62	2–0
3	November 14	Sheboygan	53–45	3–0
4	November 17	Tri-Cities	58–56	4–0
5	November 21	Anderson	66–60	5–0
6	November 23	N Detroit	78–54	6–0
7	November 24	@ Waterloo	59–68	6–1
8	November 25	@ Sheboygan	65–63	7–1
9	November 27	@ Oshkosh	64–54	8–1
10	November 28	@ Hammond	65–71	8–2
11	November 29	@ Anderson	59–65	8–3
12	December 2	Waterloo	68–59	9–3
13	December 3	N Waterloo	72–71	10–3
14	December 5	Denver	76–64	11–3
15	December 12	Sheboygan	77–65	12–3
16	December 13	N Oshkosh	68–55	13–3
17	December 16	@ Sheboygan	46–67	13–4
18	December 18	@ Oshkosh	55–60	13–5
19	December 19	@ Tri-Cities	66–67	13–6
20	December 20	@ Denver	54–60	13–7
21	December 22	@ Denver	59–49	14–7
22	December 26	Anderson	57–73	14–8
23	December 28	N Tri-Cities	87–74	15–8
24	December 30	Tri-Cities	83–74	16–8
25	January 2	Hammond	59–70	16–9
26	January 6	Oshkosh	75–70	17–9
27	January 9	Sheboygan	65–57	18–9
28	January 13	Oshkosh	79–72	19–9
29	January 16	@ Tri-Cities	72–83	19–10
30	January 17	N Sheboygan	75–66	20–10
31	January 20	Denver	59–55	21–10
32	January 23	Denver	82–57	22–10
33	January 27	Tri-Cities	58–55	23–10
34	January 29	N Dayton	85–65	24–10
35	January 30	Dayton	78–68	25–10
36	January 31	N Dayton	65–55	26–10
37	February 3	Hammond	68–49	27–10
38	February 6	Waterloo	79–75	28–10
39	February 9	@ Hammond	67–76	28–11
40	February 13	Hammond	83–61	29–11
41	February 14	@ Anderson	61–71	29–12
42	February 16	@ Denver	71–66	30–12
43	February 18	@ Denver	54–71	30–13
44	February 20	@ Tri-Cities	66–75	30–14
45	February 21	N Waterloo	76–65	31–14
46	February 22	@ Oshkosh	38–61	31–15
47	February 24	Dayton	66–49	32–15
48	February 27	@ Tri-Cities	40–51	32–16
49	February 28	@ Anderson	69–72	32–17
50	March 3	Oshkosh	67–55	33–17
51	March 6	Dayton	61–57	34–17
52	March 9	N Waterloo	61–51	35–17
53	March 10	Waterloo	61–65	35–18
54	March 13	@ Hammond	73–64	36–18
55	March 14	@ Anderson	75–82	36–19
56	March 15	N Dayton	51–69	36–20
57	March 17	Oshkosh	61–63	36–21
58	March 20	Hammond	77–63	37–21
59	March 24	Sheboygan	79–73	38–21
60	March 27	Anderson	71–60	39–21
61	March 29	@ Hammond	74–69 (OT)	40–21
62	March 30	@ Sheboygan	66–91	40–22
63	March 31	@ Waterloo	68–69	40–23

A 64th game was intended to have been played for this season, but it was ultimately cancelled for whatever reason (likely due to the cancellation of the Detroit Vagabond Kings and the subsequent replacement of the Dayton Rens for the rest of the season).

== NBL Playoffs ==
=== NBL Eastern Division Opening Round ===
(2E) Syracuse Nationals vs. (3E) Hammond Calumet Buccaneers: Syracuse wins series 2–0

- Game 1: April 1, 1949 @ Hammond: Syracuse 80, Hammond 69
- Game 2: April 3, 1949 @ Syracuse: Syracuse 72, Hammond 66

=== NBL Eastern Division Semifinals ===
(2E) Syracuse Nationals vs. (1E) Anderson Duffey Packers: Anderson wins series 3–1

- Game 1: April 8, 1949 @ Syracuse: Anderson 89, Syracuse 74
- Game 2: April 10, 1949 @ Syracuse: Syracuse 80, Anderson 62
- Game 3: April 11, 1949 @ Anderson: Anderson 76, Syracuse 59
- Game 4: April 13, 1949 @ Anderson: Anderson 90, Syracuse 84

== Awards and records ==
- Al Cervi – NBL Coach of the Year, All-NBL First Team
- Dolph Schayes – NBL Rookie of the Year, NBL All-Rookie First Team
- Ed Peterson – NBL All-Rookie Second Team
- Billy Gabor – NBL All-Rookie Second Team
