= Gene Berce =

American basketball player (1926–2018)

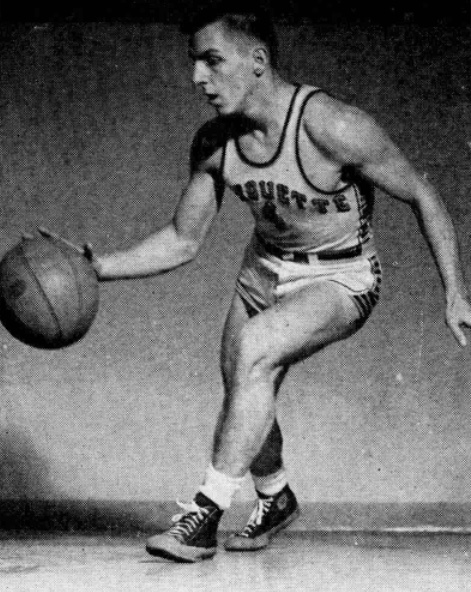
- Berce from the 1947 Hilltop

Personal information
- Born: November 22, 1926 Milwaukee, Wisconsin, U.S.
- Died: November 17, 2018 (aged 91)
- Listed height: 5 ft 11 in (1.80 m)
- Listed weight: 175 lb (79 kg)

Career information
- High school: Marquette University HS (Milwaukee, Wisconsin)
- College: Cornell (1945–1946); Marquette (1946–1948)
- NBA draft: 1948: 6th round, —
- Drafted by: New York Knicks
- Playing career: 1948–1951
- Position: Guard / forward

Career history
- 1948–1949: Oshkosh All-Stars
- 1949–1950: Tri-Cities Blackhawks
- 1950–1951: Saint Paul Lights
- 1951: Kansas City Hi-Spots
- Stats at NBA.com
- Stats at Basketball Reference

Eugene Daniel Berce (November 22, 1926 – November 17, 2018) was an American basketball player. He played collegiately for the Cornell Big Red and what are now the Marquette Golden Eagles.

He was selected by the New York Knicks in the 1948 BAA draft. He played for the Tri-Cities Blackhawks (1949–50) in the NBA for 3 games. He was the first Marquette player to score 1,000 career points, and is in the Marquette Hall of Fame.

Berce died on November 17, 2018, at age 91.

== Career statistics ==
Legend
| GP | Games played | GS | Games started | MPG | Minutes per game |
| FG% | Field goal percentage | 3P% | 3-point field goal percentage | FT% | Free throw percentage |
| RPG | Rebounds per game | APG | Assists per game | SPG | Steals per game |
| BPG | Blocks per game | PPG | Points per game | **Bold** | Career high |

=== NBA ===
==== Regular season ====
| Year | Team | GP | MPG | FG% | FT% | RPG | APG | PPG |
|---|---|---|---|---|---|---|---|---|
| 1949–50 | Tri-Cities | 3 | – | .313 | .000 | – | .7 | 3.3 |
