= Bob Mulvihill =

American basketball player

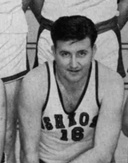
- Mulvihill in 1949

Personal information
- Born: March 9, 1924 Washington, D.C., U.S.
- Died: May 17, 2016 (aged 92) Manasquan, New Jersey, U.S.
- Listed height: 6 ft 1 in (1.85 m)
- Listed weight: 185 lb (84 kg)

Career information
- High school: Gonzaga Prep (Washington, D.C.)
- College: Fordham (1942–1943); Rochester (1943–1944); Fordham (1946–1948)
- NBA draft: 1948: undrafted
- Position: Guard

Career history
- 1948–1949: Oshkosh All-Stars
- 1950–1951: Torrington Howards

Robert Francis Mulvihill (March 9, 1924 – May 17, 2016) was an American professional basketball player. He played in the National Basketball League for the Oshkosh All-Stars during the 1948–49 season and averaged 0.9 points per game. He also spent a season playing for Torrington in the East Coast League.

During college, Mulvihill played for Fordham but was interrupted by serving in World War II (during which time he played for the University of Rochester). He finished his collegiate career at Fordham however. Mulvihill eventually moved to Clifton, New Jersey and taught at St. Peter's Preparatory School in Jersey City, New Jersey. He spent 37 years in the school system before retiring.
