= Bill Brown (basketball, born 1922) =

American basketball player (born 1922)

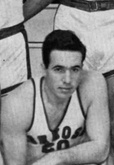
- Brown in 1948

Personal information
- Born: August 2, 1922 Blackford, Kentucky, U.S.
- Died: January 15, 2007 (aged 84) Devon, Pennsylvania, U.S.
- Listed height: 6 ft 3 in (1.91 m)
- Listed weight: 205 lb (93 kg)

Career information
- College: Maryland (1945–1947)
- NBA draft: 1948: – round, 76th overall pick
- Drafted by: Philadelphia Warriors
- Playing career: 1948–1949
- Position: Forward / guard

Career history
- 1948: Oshkosh All-Stars
- 1948–1949: Waterloo Hawks
- Stats at Basketball Reference

Wilfred Bailey "Bill" Brown (August 2, 1922 – January 15, 2007) was an American professional basketball player in the United States' National Basketball League (NBL). He played for the Oshkosh All-Stars and Waterloo Hawks during the 1948–49 season. After a collegiate career at the University of Maryland, College Park, Brown was selected in the 1948 BAA draft by the Philadelphia Warriors as the 76th overall pick. He pursued a career in the NBL, however, and played both the forward and guard positions.
