= 1948–49 Detroit Vagabond Kings season =

Aborted NBL professional basketball team season

- Head coach: Del Loranger (player-coach)
- General manager: Ernie Pabis?
- Owner(s): C. King Boring; Ernie Pabis
- Arena: Holy Redeemer High School Gymnasium; Dearborn High School Gymnasium

Results
- Record: 2–17 (.105)
- Place: Division: N/A (5th) (Eastern)
- Playoff finish: Did not qualify (folded operations)

The 1948–49 Detroit Vagabond Kings season was the first and only professional season played for the Detroit Vagabond Kings franchise in the National Basketball League, especially since it would ultimately be the last season for that league's general existence. While this was officially the first (and only) professional season of play for the Detroit Vagabond Kings franchise (who were owned by Ernie Pabis and former Detroit Gems owner C. King Boring), they did later end up becoming a barnstorming franchise themselves up until 1956, which included former University of Kentucky champion center Bill Spivey and future Football Hall of Famer Doug Atkins playing for them during that period of time. Due to the NBL losing four of their major franchises to the rivaling Basketball Association of America, they would start out this season with only four teams in the Eastern Division (including the Detroit Vagabond Kings) and five teams in the Western Division.

The Detroit Vagabond Kings would start out the final season of the NBL when it began (in a match against the Oshkosh All-Stars) on October 30, 1948, but due to a combination of them playing in mixed home venues in the Detroit area, the poor attendance they had in the venues they did play in (hardly exceeding 1,000 paid attendees in a few of the games they had in the one venue that did exceed that amount), and the poor record they had before folding operations with a 2–17 record (with their only wins being against the original Denver Nuggets team that first began existing in the Amateur Athletic Union on November 9 and December 7, 1948, with 56–48 and 86–76 victories on those respective dates), the Vagabond Kings folded operations as a professional franchise on December 16. Following a dispersal draft with the NBL's eight remaining teams with regards to the Vagabond Kings' own players, this soon led to NBL commissioner Doxie Moore and NBL president Ike Duffey convincing the New York Renaissance's team owner, Bob Douglas, to take over the Vagabond Kings' position in the NBL (meaning they'd inherit Detroit's 2–17 record upon entry) and rebranding that franchise to the Dayton Rens (playing their home games in Dayton, Ohio instead of in Harlem out in Manhattan, New York despite Dayton being a notably segregated area in the state of Ohio at the time due to the small following the Rens acquired in the city of Dayton) the following day afterward for the rest of the 1948–49 NBL season. Due to the Rens being an all-black franchise for their entire history, the Dayton Rens would end up becoming the first ever racially integrated franchise to ever join a professional league that was previously considered all or mostly white oriented up until the day the Rens officially joined the NBL. While the Rens ended up performing a lot better in the remaining games they played throughout the rest of the season than the Vagabond Kings did (with Dayton going 14–26 in the remaining 40 games they played in the NBL, which gave the Rens a total combined record of 16–43 when including the previous games the Detroit Vagabond Kings had in the NBL), they still ended up missing out on joining the final NBL Playoffs ever played altogether due, in part, to the awkward way the Eastern Division was set up on their ends (while the Eastern Division technically did have five teams competing there alongside the Western Division, the Eastern Division was forced to utilize the Rens replacing the Detroit Vagabond Kings with their combined records as the official fourth and final team there for the rest of the season) alongside the Rens being forced to combine their 40 games played with the previous games the Detroit Vagabond Kings had earlier in the season.

== Draft picks ==
The Detroit Vagabond Kings would participate in the 1948 NBL draft, which occurred right after the 1948 BAA draft when plans for a joint draft between the National Basketball League and the rivaling Basketball Association of America ultimately fell out when the defending NBL champion Minneapolis Lakers, Rochester Royals, Fort Wayne Zollner Pistons, and Indianapolis Kautskys turned Jets all defected from the NBL to the BAA. However, as of 2026, no records of what the Vagabond Kings' draft picks might have been for the NBL have properly come up (assuming they even would be ready by the time the 1948 NBL draft began), with any information on who those selections might have been (especially since the Detroit franchise would be considered an expansion franchise for the NBL this season) being lost to time in the process.

== Detroit Vagabond Kings Roster ==
1948–49 Detroit Vagabond Kings roster
Players

Pos.	No.	Player	Height	Weight	DOB	From
F/C		Art Bakeraitis	6 ft 4 in (1.93 m)	210 lb (95 kg)	1925–02–19	Bay City Junior College
G		Fred Campbell	5 ft 11 in (1.80 m)	175 lb (79 kg)	1920–08–08	Southern Illinois
F		Doyle Cofer	6 ft 4 in (1.93 m)	185 lb (84 kg)	1923–01–18	Indiana State
F		Dillard Crocker	6 ft 4 in (1.93 m)	205 lb (93 kg)	1923–01–18	Western Michigan
F/C		Hal Devoll	6 ft 6 in (1.98 m)	210 lb (95 kg)	1925–01–19	Lawrence Tech
G/F		Paul Juntunen	6 ft 1 in (1.85 m)	180 lb (82 kg)	1921–02–13	Wayne State
C		Tony Kaseta	6 ft 8 in (2.03 m)	220 lb (100 kg)	1923–09–29	Northern HS (MI)
F/C		Dave Latter	6 ft 6 in (1.98 m)	210 lb (95 kg)	1922–01–05	Leslie HS (MI)
G/F		Del Loranger	6 ft 3 in (1.91 m)	175 lb (79 kg)	1920–03–17	Western Michigan
G/F		Ben Schadler	6 ft 0 in (1.83 m)	185 lb (84 kg)	1924–03–09	Northwestern
G/F		Johnny Sebastian	6 ft 0 in (1.83 m)	185 lb (84 kg)	1921–11–20	Southern Illinois
G		Ollie Shoaff	5 ft 10 in (1.78 m)	165 lb (75 kg)	1923–11–10	Southern Illinois
G		Dick Shrider	6 ft 2 in (1.88 m)	190 lb (86 kg)	1923–02–07	Ohio

Coaches
Head coach
- Del Loranger

Legend
- (DP) Unsigned draft pick
- (FA) Free agent
- (S) Suspended
- Injured

Roster

== Detroit Vagabond Kings Schedule ==
Not to be confused with exhibition or other non-NBL scheduled games that did not count towards Detroit's official NBL record for this season. An official database created by John Grasso detailing every NBL match possible (outside of two matches that the Kankakee Gallagher Trojans won over the Dayton Metropolitans in 1938) would be released in 2026 showcasing every team's official schedules throughout their time spent in the NBL. As such, these are the official results recorded for the Detroit Vagabond Kings during their only season in the NBL.

#	Date	Opponent	Score	Record
1	October 30	@ Oshkosh	59–72	0–1
2	November 1	@ Anderson	59–89	0–2
3	November 3	N Oshkosh	37–75	0–3
4	November 4	N Oshkosh	59–63	0–4
5	November 6	@ Oshkosh	54–81	0–5
6	November 7	@ Hammond	65–71	0–6
7	November 9	N Denver	56–54	1–6
8	November 14	@ Waterloo	53–72	1–7
9	November 16	Sheboygan	57–64	1–8
10	November 23	N Syracuse	54–78	1–9
11	November 27	@ Tri-Cities	73–92	1–10
12	November 30	Waterloo	63–65	1–11
13	December 1	N Anderson	62–76	1–12
14	December 2	@ Anderson	60–86	1–13
15	December 4	Denver	56–64	1–14
16	December 7	Denver	86–76	2–14
17	December 11	Sheboygan	65–80	2–15
18	December 13	Hammond	59–78	2–16
19	December 16	N Anderson	84–92	2–17

== Season standings ==
Pos.	Eastern Division	Wins	Losses	Win %
1	Anderson Duffey Packers	49	15	.766
2	Syracuse Nationals	40	23	.635
3	Hammond Calumet Buccaneers	21	41	.339
4	Dayton Rens^{‡}	14	26	.350
5	Detroit Vagabond Kings^{‡}	2	17	.105
^{‡} Dayton replaced Detroit, who disbanded during the season, and assumed Detroit's record in the standings. Their combined record was 16–43.

== Detroit's NBL Dispersal Draft ==
When the Detroit Vagabond Kings announced that they would fold operations altogether for the rest of the 1948–49 NBL season on December 16, 1948, the NBL hosted an impromptu dispersal draft of sorts later that same day (as well as one day before the Dayton Rens were placed in the NBL as the replacement squad for Detroit) involving the remaining NBL teams acquiring any of the Vagabond Kings' players that they felt interested in acquiring along the way, similar to the way the Chicago American Gears' players were redistributed amongst the other NBL teams in the previous season there following the quick collapse of the American Gears' failed rivaling Professional Basketball League of America. When this dispersal draft of sorts became completed, it saw former Syracuse Nationals turned Detroit player Johnny Sebastian, Ollie Shoaff, and Hal Devoll all going to the Hammond Calumet Buccaneers (who became a short-lived NBL franchise themselves by the end of this season), former Fort Wayne Pistons player from the now-rivaling Basketball Association of America (now Detroit Pistons of the National Basketball Association) Dillard Crocker going to the Anderson Duffey Packers (who would end up winning the final NBL championship that season), and former Chicago Stags (of the BAA) player Ben Schadler going to the Waterloo Hawks, with former Detroit Gems players Dave Latter and player-coach Del Loranger opting to retire from NBL play altogether and stay in the city of Detroit instead. Beyond those players, however, there was very little interest in any of the other players on the Vagabond Kings' roster by comparison to the interest that was had for the former NBL champion Chicago American Gears' players, though one player from the Vagabond Kings named Dick Shrider did previously play for the New York Knicks in the rivaling Basketball Association of America in this season before joining the Detroit squad. Incidentally, one other Vagabond Kings player (and former Detroit Gems player-coach), Fred Campbell, would end up returning to the Vagabond Kings franchise once they became a barnstorming franchise, with Campbell also being a player-coach as well for a few years there.
