= Hammond Calumet Buccaneers =

- Leagues: National Basketball League
- Founded: 1948
- Dissolved: 1949
- Arena: Hammond Civic Center (capacity:6,000)
- Location: Hammond, Indiana
- Team colors: Navy Blue, Dark Red, White
- Championships: 0

The Hammond Calumet Buccaneers were a professional team of basketball that competed in the National Basketball League for only the 1948–49 season. They were based in Hammond, Indiana, and played in the Hammond Civic Center for home games. The creation of the Calumet Buccaneers franchise would occur for Hammond by Ike Duffey's discretion as the president of the NBL alongside his role as team owner of the nearby Anderson Duffey Packers franchise, as he would buy out the financially struggling Toledo Jeeps franchise that had tried to jump from the NBL to the rivaling Basketball Association of America earlier on and persuaded a northern Indiana businessman named Walter Thornton to sell the franchise to a group of backers in the cities of Hammond, Whiting, East Chicago, Indiana, and Calumet City, Illinois. The group of 200 backers that owned the franchise for $100 per share from those four cities would have the Calumet Buccaneers operate similarly to the Oshkosh All-Stars and Sheboygan Red Skins teams in the NBL, as well as the Green Bay Packers of the NFL by being community owned and operated teams.

The team ranked third in the Eastern Division, and was eliminated in the first round of the playoffs by the Syracuse Nationals. After losing their playoff series to the Nationals, the Calumet Buccaneers would join the Oshkosh All-Stars and Dayton Rens (an all-black team) as the only NBL teams not to join the Basketball Association of America (BAA) in their merger to become the NBA. For the case of the short-lived Hammond Calumet Buccaneers franchise, the people involved with the franchise tried to raise the funds necessary to get themselves their promotion into the NBL/BAA merger that's now known as the NBA, but they ultimately failed to get the funds necessary on their ends to get the merger promotion in mind. In addition to the lack of extra funds on their end, it was thought that the Hammond squad was too close to proximity to the Chicago Stags BAA-turned-NBA franchise, though the Stags would ironically fold operations a year after the NBA merger happened themselves due to ownership issues (though the NBA would later have multiple different franchises play in Chicago after the Stags folded operations with the Chicago Packers/Zephyrs first being created in the early 1960s and the Chicago Bulls later operating to this day since 1967). While the Rens didn't do a dispersal draft of their players due to racial segregation and the All-Stars initially diverted their players into an original Wisconsin-based NBA team out in either Milwaukee (before the existence of the Milwaukee Hawks and Milwaukee Bucks) or Green Bay before later forcing their players into a dispersal draft into the now-NBA's teams, Hammond's players (which featured the likes of Don Boven, Joe Camic, Jake Carter, Ted Cook, George Glamack, Dick Hammond, Bobby McDermott, Al Miksis, Stan Patrick, Jack Phelan, Ollie Shoaff, Sterling Scott, Johnny Sebastian, Wayne See, Chips Sobek, and Clint Wager) would all move out of Hammond and look to play for the Waterloo Hawks instead.
