= Dayton Rens =

The Dayton Rens were a member of the National Basketball League (NBL) for the 1948–49 season and were the only all-black team to play in a white league. This milestone came just one year after Jackie Robinson, playing for the Brooklyn Dodgers, broke the color barrier in Major League Baseball, as well as one year before the New York / Saratoga Harlem Yankees did the same thing themselves while competing in the rivaling American Basketball League. The Rens ended the 1948-49 season with an overall record of 16–43 due to the NBL combining their own record with another defunct team when the Rens joined the NBL properly.

The Dayton Rens, formerly the New York Renaissance, or Rens, moved to Dayton, Ohio in the middle of the NBL season to replace the Detroit Vagabond Kings, who went out of existence on December 17, 1948. The Rens inherited the Kings' 2–17 record. The Dayton Rens compiled a 14–26 record, ending the season with an overall record of 16–43.

While not all that successful in their one year in the NBL, the Rens had been a widely successful and popular barnstorming team during the 1920s and 1930s. The Rens had traveled across the Northeast and Midwest of the United States, attracting crowds as large as 15,000 to watch their games. As such, the NBL invited the Rens in hopes of bolstering a league that was slowly fading away faced with direct competition from the newly formed Basketball Association of America (BAA). Four of the more popular NBL teams—the Minneapolis Lakers, the Fort Wayne (Zollner) Pistons, the Rochester Royals, and the Indianapolis Kautskys—had moved to the BAA prior to the start of the 1948–49 season. The NBL needed a popular team and so chose the New York Rens.

The choice to invite an all-black team was not all that difficult given that the NBL had been integrated almost from its original inception back when the NBL was going by the Midwest Basketball Conference at the time. The NBL had come into existence on the eve of World War II. With the entry of the United States into World War II and the drafting of many of its white players into the armed forces, the NBL sought out African-Americans to fill the vacancies on its teams. For the 1942–43 season, the NBL integrated when 10 black players joined two of its teams, the Toledo Jim White Chevrolets and the Chicago Studebaker Flyers. The integration of African Americans into the sport of professional basketball was conducted to shore up existing teams and franchises.

As such, a history and tradition of African Americans playing in the NBL had already existed by the time the New York Renaissance were invited into the league. Still, when the Rens took over as a franchise in Dayton, Ohio instead of under their usual franchise name out in New York in December 1948, they were not welcomed so fondly by the locals in Dayton.

The Rens roster included future NBA player Hank DeZonie, William "Dolly" King, Duke Cumberland, and George Crowe. Coaching and playing with the team was future Hall of Fame member William "Pop" Gates.

The move to Dayton to become the first all-black team in a white league was just another groundbreaking achievement by this team. The New York/Dayton Rens were pioneers that set the stage for the integration of the National Basketball Association (NBA), which occurred on October 31, 1950, when Earl Lloyd became the first African American to play in an NBA game with the Washington Capitols.

When the 1949 merger between the BAA and NBL created the NBA, the Rens were not included and ceased to exist under the Dayton Rens name. Instead, the franchise continued to operate under their original New York Renaissance name until 1951, where they ultimately folded operations for good by then.
