= Black Fives =

Former United States amateur, semi-pro, and professional basketball network

Black Fives is a term that refers to the all-Black basketball teams that existed in the United States between 1904, when the game was first played by African Americans on a wide-scale organized basis, and 1950, when the NBA signed its first Black players. The Black Fives Era produced notable NBA players who contributed to African American history.

== History ==
The year 1904 was the start of the Black Fives Era, which was marked by the formation of "Black Fives" teams as a result of African Americans' exclusion from mainstream leagues. The Black Five teams disbanded when the National Basketball Association became racially integrated in 1950.

Early basketball teams were often called "fives” in reference to the five starting players. All-black teams were known as colored quints, colored fives, Negro fives, or black fives.

Dozens of all-black teams emerged during the Black Fives Era, in New York City, Washington, Chicago, Pittsburgh, Philadelphia, Cleveland, and other cities. They were sponsored by or affiliated with churches, athletic clubs, social clubs, businesses, newspapers, YMCA branches, and other organizations.

=== Washington and New York origins ===
Edwin Henderson, considered the "Grandfather of Black Basketball," was a black gym teacher who is credited with being the first to introduce the game of basketball to African Americans in a wide scale organized way, in the winter of 1904 in Washington, D.C., through physical education classes in the district's racially segregated public school system. This introduction took place 13 years after basketball was invented. Henderson learned the sport while taking summer classes in physical training at Harvard University. Envisioning basketball not as an end in itself but as a public-health and civil-rights tool, Henderson believed that, by organizing black athletics, it would be possible to send more outstanding black student athletes to excel at northern white colleges and debunk negative stereotypes of the race. Henderson reasoned that in sports, unlike politics and business, the black race would get a fair chance to succeed.

According to Henderson, the relatively new sport was not an immediate hit with his students. “Among blacks, basketball was at first considered a ‘sissy’ game, as was tennis in the rugged days of football,” he later wrote. In 1906, Henderson co-founded (along with Garnet Wilkinson of the M Street High School and W. A. Joiner of Howard University, as well as W. A. Decatur and Robert Mattingly of Armstrong Technical High School) the Inter-Scholastic Athletic Association of Middle Atlantic States, an amateur sports organization designed to encourage competition among intercollegiate and interscholastic athletes, in track and field as well as in basketball.

Subsequently, several all-black basketball teams made up of players from public schools, athletic clubs, churches, colleges, and Colored YMCAs began to emerge in the Washington, D.C., area. Simultaneously, basketball was catching on among African Americans in New York City, and these two urban centers served as the early incubators of the black game.

The first independent African American basketball team in the history of the sport was the Smart Set Athletic Club of Brooklyn, which was organized in 1907. This team promptly won the first "Colored Basketball World's Championship"—a title coined by African American sportswriters to honor the best all-black basketball team, by their informal consensus, for the 1907–08 season.

The first inter-city competition between two African American basketball teams took place on December 18, 1908, when the Smart Set Athletic Club traveled to Washington, D.C., to play the Crescent Athletic Club. Brooklyn won the game.

Black Fives teams relied on donations and contributions from their local communities. Fans, business owners, and community leaders often provided financial assistance to help cover expenses such as equipment, uniforms, travel costs, and venue rentals.

The first all-black pay-for-play team was the New York All-Stars, formed in the fall of 1910 by former St. Christopher Club manager Major A. Hart. Hart wrote:

"That this game has taken a firm hold on our people has been demonstrated beyond a doubt. Now it is up to the players and their friends [to advance the black game] by not only forming a basketball league among the teams, but playing good, fast, clean games, eliminating therefrom all petty jealousies, quarrels and the little meannesses that have a tendency to disgust the people who assemble to witness these contests. We want to play the game as our white friends play it. That is, in the spirit of fairness and for the benefits that the exercise will give us and the enjoyment we can afford to our friends."

Hart clearly envisioned basketball as entertainment and therefore as an opportunity to create revenue—not just as physical education. Like Henderson and the 12th Street YMCA team, he recognized that a winning team of all-star performers would help further popularize the game among African-Americans

The Harlem Renaissance was one of the most prominent all-Black basketball teams during the Black Fives Era. Founded in the early 1923 in Harlem, New York City, the team quickly gained recognition for their exceptional skill, athleticism, and unique style of play. They had an all-time record of 2588 wins and 529 losses.

=== Early days ===
By the 1912–13 season, inter-city competition had become a staple of the black game. No longer did facing the best teams mean making a three-day trip to Washington or New York. Inter-city competition had grown in just four seasons into an expanding network of towns and cities that also included Philadelphia, Pittsburgh, Newark, Baltimore and Atlantic City, and the college campuses of Howard, Hampton and Lincoln. In a few more seasons, the network would extend into the Midwest and New England.

The black game also had begun to develop a deeper pool of talent. At Harlem's St. Christopher Club, where teams were said to have the luxury of practicing "two hours a day regularly", the seeds already had been sown for the next great New York team. At Hampton University in Virginia, another outstanding college team was in the making under the direction of physical educator Charles Holston Williams. At the same time, a boom in the construction of YMCAs for black men was under way, which would have a profound impact on the training of young players in cities throughout the country.

But in 1913, the black game's two best teams were the Howard Big Five and Pittsburgh's champion Monticello Athletic Association. The Howard University team clearly had more talent and greater cohesion, with most of its stars having played four seasons together. George Gilmore was the best center in the black game, Ed Gray was the best defender, and Hudson Oliver was probably the second-best player overall.

The title of best player overall belonged to Monticello's Cum Posey. According to some, Posey stood shoulder to shoulder with Paul Robeson, John Henry Lloyd, Oscar Charleston and other great black baseball and football players as the finest athlete of his generation. "Giants crumpled and quit before the fragile-looking Posey", recalled W. Rollo Wilson of the Pittsburgh Courier in the late 1920s. "He was at once a ghost, a buzz saw, and a 'shooting fool'. The word 'quit' has never been translated for him."

=== The Professional Game ===
Black professional basketball in America, begun by Major Hart and the New York All Stars in 1910, began to grow and flourish in the 1920s. In 1922, the McMahon brothers established the Commonwealth Big 5 to play at their venue, the Commonwealth Casino on East 135th Street in Harlem. A year later, Robert Douglas, a resident of New York City who had emigrated from the British West Indies in about 1902, founded the Rens-–the Renaissance Big Five. The Commonwealth Big 5 won most of the contests between the two teams, but did not draw large crowds, and the McMahons shut down the team after two years, leaving the Rens to become one of the sport's top draws in white and black America alike.

The Rens were named after the Renaissance Casino and Ballroom in Harlem, where they played their first game on November 3, 1923, a 28–22 victory over a white team called the Collegiate Five. The ballroom was owned by Sarco Realty Company and William Roach, who allowed the dance floor to double as a basketball court to accommodate Douglas's team. It was far from an ideal site for basketball, preceding the era of the beautiful, tailor-made arenas of today's game. "It was rectangular, but more box-like," said former Rens star Pop Gates, arguably the best player of his day and a Hall of Fame inductee.

"They set up a basketball post on each end of the floor. The floor was very slippery and they outlined the sidelines and foul lines. It wasn't a big floor. It was far from being a regular basketball floor. Other than high schools or armories, they had very few places to play at, except the Negro college. It was a well-decorated area – chandeliers, a bandstand. All the big [dance bands] played the Renaissance – Fatha Hines, Duke Ellington, Count Basie, Ella Fitzgerald, Chick Webb's band. They had the dancing before the ball game. People would pay and [dance] prior to the game, at halftime, and after the game."

Because the basketball games were, essentially, part of an evening of entertainment and fun, that led to Black Fives Era teams having to develop a faster-paced more entertaining game that involved more athletic and daring styles of play. Flashiness was considered an essential part of the game, not the self-glorifying aberration it was considered in the white game.

Dance halls lost their popularity in the late 1920s and early 1930s when the Depression strangled the economy and deprived people of spare cash. According to Susan J. Rayl, lagging attendance convinced Douglas to send his team on the road in 1928 in the northeast; by the 1930 season the Rens were playing games throughout the Midwest. In 1933, they began barnstorming the South. Beginning in 1931, he had assembled a team so skilled that it was nicknamed the Magnificent Seven because of the excellence of its key players: Charles "Tarzan" Cooper, Clarence "Fat" Jenkins, John "Casey" Holt, James "Pappy" Ricks, Eyre "Bruiser" Saitch, William "Wee Willie" Smith and Bill Yancey.

The highlight of the Rens' long history was an 88-game winning streak from January 1, 1933, through a game on March 27, 1933, when they lost to the Original Celtics. From 1932 to 1936, the Rens had a remarkable 497–58 record. "Our basketball heroes were the New York Rens and I used to see them play," Gates said. "I'd sneak in or get 50 cents to watch them play." He also had seen them practice because the Harlem YMCA, where Gates played ball as a youngster, was a practice site for the Rens.

The Rens would leave New York for months at a time, traveling thousands of miles and playing every night and twice on Sundays. Sometimes they slept on their bus because they couldn't find a place to stay under the prevailing Jim Crow laws. Once, an Indiana restaurant owner put a tall screen around the team's table to segregate the Rens from other customers. John Isaacs, a standout player for the Rens in the 1930s credited with bringing the pick-and-roll play to the professional game, walked out. He sat in the bus and made a meal of salami on Ritz crackers.

On the court, the Rens faced hostile crowds, ruthless name calling and overtly biased referees. Their motto on the road was "Get 10," meaning that they wanted to come out and grab a quick 10-point lead. "That was the 10 the officials were going to take away from you," Isaacs recalls. In 1939, the Rens went 112–7, swept into Chicago and beat a top white pro team, the Oshkosh All-Stars, to win the first ever world championship tournament.

=== Latter days ===
In the 1940s, when the National Basketball Association's predecessor leagues were not much of a fan draw, the leagues stayed alive by staging doubleheaders with the Harlem Globetrotters, which had emerged from the Black Five league in Chicago. The Rens and other barnstormers helped nurture and popularize the game that is now an international, multibillion-dollar industry. John Isaacs, who played with the Rens from 1936 to 1940, earned $150 a month plus $3 a day meal money after signing with the Rens out of high school. "We enjoyed it and played it as a sport," Isaacs said. Today, pro basketball "is about money."

In the 1940s, the Globetrotters emerged as a team that was as dominant as the Rens were. However the Globetrotters never agreed to play the Rens after losing to them in their only meeting.

The Black Fives era ended in the late 1940s with the gradual integration of white professional basketball leagues, led by the National Basketball League. As more African American players joined integrated professional leagues like the NBA, interest in Black Fives teams began to decrease. Black Fives teams faced significant financial challenges, including limited resources, lack of sponsorship opportunities, and difficulties in securing venues for games. When the NBL merged with the all-white and racially segregated Basketball Association of America in 1949, they formed the National Basketball Association (NBA). In 1950 the NBA signed its first African American players. Early black players in the NBA experienced continual racism and racial tension from fans, teammates, opposing players, coaches, referees, and owners. However, they persevered and the situation gradually became easier as the league drafted more and more African Americans.

Nonetheless, even those who made the NBA after integration began were forced to be role players, concentrating on rebounding and defense. Black pros did not get a chance to showcase their talents in the league until the arrival of Bill Russell and Wilt Chamberlain.

In 1963, the 1933 version of the Rens team was collectively named to the Basketball Hall of Fame. Only their arch-rivals, the Original Celtics, and the Buffalo Germans received the same honor. The Rens' selection was well-deserved, for despite traveling and playing throughout America when the harsh effect of segregation was common and often legal, they compiled a 2318–381 record before the team folded in 1949.

In 2005, the 109th United States Congress passed a joint resolution that "recognizes the teams and players of the barnstorming African-American basketball teams for their achievement, dedication, sacrifices, and contribution to basketball and to the nation prior to the integration of the white professional leagues."

=== Colored Basketball World's Champions ===
The title "Colored Basketball World Champion" was coined by Lester Walton of the New York Age newspaper, subsequently adopted by African American sportswriters, and conferred informally to honor the best all-black basketball team. A single listing represents consensus.

- Smart Set Athletic Club of Brooklyn—1907-08
- Smart Set Athletic Club of Brooklyn—1908-09
- Washington 12th Street Colored YMCA—1909-10
- Howard University—1910-11
- Monticello Athletic Association—1911-12
- Alpha Physical Culture Club/Howard University—1912-13
- St. Christopher Club—1913-14
- New York Incorporators—1914-15
- Hampton Institute—1915-16
- New York Incorporators/St. Christopher Club—1916-17
- St. Christopher Club/New York Incorporators—1917-18
- St. Christopher Club—1918-19
- Loendi Big Five—1919-20
- Loendi Big Five—1920-21
- Loendi Big Five—1921-22
- Loendi Big Five—1922-23
- Commonwealth Five/Eighth Regiment Five of Chicago—1923-24
- Harlem Renaissance Big Five—1924-25

=== The Black Fives Foundation ===
The Black Fives Foundation (founded in January 2013) is an independent 501(c)3 nonprofit organization whose mission is to research, preserve, showcase, teach, and honor the pre-NBA history of African Americans in basketball. Its founder and executive director is Claude Johnson, historian and author of “The Black Fives: The Epic Story of Basketball's Forgotten Era" (Abrams Press, May 2022).
