= Jackie Bethards =

American professional basketball player

Jackie Bethards was a pre-World War II African American professional basketball player from Philadelphia. As a boy, Bethards played at the Christian Street YMCA along with Charles "Tarzan" Cooper, Zack Clayton, and Bill Yancey. There they began four fruitful careers on a squad called the Tribune Men.

== "Clown Prince of Basketball" ==
As early as 1927, playing alongside "Stretch" Cooper for the Philadelphia Scholastics, Bethards was reported to have been "the sensation while in New England" by the Baltimore Afro-American. Six years later, playing alongside Clayton and Yancey for the Philadelphia Giants in another New England swing, Jackie reportedly entered a contest in the 2nd quarter with the Giants on the wrong side of a 20–7 score and, described as "unquestionably one of the best semi-pro players in the business," proceeded to hit "long shot after long shot" to tighten the game. Following a Clayton fielder that brought the Giants to within a point, Bethards "let a long shot fly that registered the winning digits" in a 32–31 win over the St Joseph's Polish Hearts.

By 1933 Jackie Bethards was commonly called the "Clown Prince of basketball", a label that came to be identified with the Harlem Globetrotters' biggest names like Goose Tatum and Meadowlark Lemon. Within a year the nickname of "Clown Prince" had followed Bethards to Chicago, whence he starred for the Savoy Big Five (also known as the Chicago Crusaders) along with such teammates as Jack Mann, Clayton, and Billy Yancey's brother John Yancey.

== New York Rens ==
Following his successful foray as a Chicagoan Jackie Bethards reunited with Bill Yancey and Tarzan Cooper on the New York Rens. Along with David "Big Dave" DeJernett, Bethards received top billing as a new Rens' star for the fabled team that had recently suffered the loss of sharpshooter Pappy Ricks. According to the Sheboygan Press, "Jack 'Rabbit' Bethards and 'Wee Willie' Smith play(ed) the leading roles in the comedy as they clown and burlesque with players and fans as well."

While he undeniably was a star with the Rens, earning the moniker "ShowBoat," Bethards only played for the club in 1935–36 and 1936–37, before being replaced in a sense by high school-to-pros phenom Johnny Isaacs. Bethards clearly kept good relations with Tarzan Cooper. Cooper once described a memorable 4th-quarter duel in 1928 between Bethards, playing for the Philadelphia Giants, and the Rens' star guard Clarence "Fats" Jenkins, saying "We gave the ball to Jackie. Fats, a master at the art of freezing, tried to take the ball away from him. I will never forget the things Jackie pulled...and he kept the ball in his possession for three minutes, kept it away from one of the greatest players the game has ever known". en route to the Giants' tense 31–29 win over the Rens in Boston.

The following year, in 1929, the outcome was similar: "Gorilla" Bethards was described as the Giants' brightest star, his "humorous antics" keeping the crowd on edge and his "all-around playing ability on a level with the best in the business" as the Giants again beat the NY Rens in Boston, 25–23.

For one of Bethards' last performances as a Ren in 1937, the story ran, "Jack Bethards, Ren forward, had the fans in thunderous applause every minute he was in the game, putting on a great basketball exhibition. He was by far the fastest man on the floor, and his handling of the ball was uncanny" to spark the Rens' 51–38 win over the Art Imigs (later the Sheboygan Redskins of the NBA).

== Style ==
That same year the Chicago Defender's Dan Burley wrote in his trademark homey fashion: "Influence of Bethards' style of basketball playing was shown in the Gladiator/Rival Dog Food clash at the Armory. George Darden, Red Bolton, an' others on th' team are perfecting th' clown formulations to a nicety.". Two days after Burley's column appeared the Sheboygan Press again weighed in, saying "The clown of the Rens is Jackie Bethards, who travels around the floor so fast fans only see a dark streak flitting about the court. A showman through and through, Jackie drives his opponents crazy with his speed and antics on the floor. A great shot, Bethards is content to thrill the fans with his speed and ball handling, leaving the scoring end of the game to the rest of his mates.".

When the Harlem Globetrotters came to Lowell, Massachusetts in 1949 fresh from wins over both the Boston Celtics and Minneapolis Lakers, Jackie Bethards' comedic influence was recalled: "The last time a team appeared in Lowell the likes of this club was when the Sacred Heart team had the famous Philadelphia Colored Giants in town featuring the great 'Gorilla' Bethards. The big interest will be in the trick style of ball the visitors play."

== Washington Bears ==
Whether he parted company with the Rens for stylistic or other reasons, for several seasons after 1937 little is known of Bethards' playing career until he resurfaced in 1942 joining John Isaacs, Cooper and Clayton on the Philadelphia Toppers in games against the Detroit Clowns and Long Island Pros. In 1942–43 Bethards also played alongside Tarzan Cooper and several other ex-NY Rens for the Washington Bears club that won the World's Pro Championship tourney in Chicago. True to reputation, Bethards was credited with freezing the ball to clinch the Bears' 27th consecutive win in a January 1943 match against the New York Clippers that ended 36–29.

For several years afterwards both Bethards and Tarzan Cooper remained associated with the Washington Bears until the fall of 1946, when Bears' owner AE Lichtman retired. Cooper, billing Bethards as one of his stars, started another team called the "Bears" back in Philadelphia but was threatened with lawsuit by the Washington Bears' new owner Harold Jackson for forging the team name. Jackson appealed to NBL commissioner Ward "Piggy" Lambert so that the National league would not book the Cooper/Bethards team for games. That is where Jackie Bethards' pro basketball playing career apparently ended, after two decades of competition.

In 1960 Philadelphia native Wilt Chamberlain announced he was fed up with the NBA and would retire after his rookie season. Comparing Wilt to the Philly pro pioneers, the Fitchburg (MA) Sentinel editorialized: "The stars of the New York Rens and Philadelphia Colored Giants were that incomparable clown Jackie Bethards, a one-man predecessor to the Harlem Globetrotters, and Zack Clayton and Tarzan Cooper, remember? We certainly don't wish to insinuate that the "Stilt" should be forced to undergo indignities of any kind, but neither do we feel that Bethards, Clayton, or Cooper would have hustled for cover as Wilt obviously has if his retirement is on the level. The major difference between then and now is that Chamberlain has somewhere to hide—back with the successful Globetrotters or as the backbone of a new major league—while the other poor guys merely headed dog-tired into the next town.".
