= On the Shoulders of Giants (film) =

- Film poster
- Directed by: Deborah Morales
- Written by: Kareem Abdul-Jabbar; Anna Waterhouse
- Produced by: Kareem Abdul-Jabbar; Deborah Morales; Ana Waterhouse
- Narrated by: Kareem Abdul Jabaar; Jamie Foxx
- Edited by: Paul Baker; Barry Cohen; Samuel D. Pollard
- Music by: Bill Cunliffe; Wynton Marsalis; Herbie Hancock; Chuck D Johnny Juice
- Production company: Union Productions
- Distributed by: Iconomy Multimedia
- Release date: February 11, 2011 (United States)
- Running time: 75 min
- Language: English

On the Shoulders of Giants: The Story of the Greatest Team You Never Heard Of is a 2011 historical sports documentary film directed by Deborah Morales, written by Kareem Abdul-Jabbar and Anna Waterhouse. The film tells the story of the All-Black professional basketball team the New York Renaissance or Harlem Rens. This team played their first game on November 3, 1923, beating the Collegiate Five, an all-white team.

== Story ==
The Harlem Rens and the playing style they exhibited first was similar to contemporary jazz. The Rens were young and proud of their black heritage.

Due to the politics of this era, and despite the level of skill that the Rens showed, they would not be permitted to play against an all-white team for a professional title. They were however able to arrange an exhibition game against the Original Celtics. While this game had no official status, it gave the Rens a chance to show that they, and African Americans in general, had a place in the limelight.

The Celtics became then world champions, albeit the Rens had an impressive win record. Harlem expressed they expected a swift victory against their white opponents, and were deservingly proud when they got one: in reverse. When the final score was not even close and the Rens, considered the pride and the hope of the black people of Harlem, had lost. It was The Great Depression incentive to put many basketball teams, black, white and mixed ones on the road as possible. The Rens played the Original Celtics and other all-white teams, adding to a long winning list. Even though constant contact turned former rivals, the Harlem Rens and the Original Celtics into a companionship and partners dynamic, racism was still present in large team leaders and committees. Bob Douglas’s primary goal, to have his team compete professionally against all-white teams, turned out to be out of reach.

During the middle of the 1930s, another team that was considered a part of Harlem started to rise up in popularity in the sport in the Harlem Globetrotters; that team was considered a direct contrast to the Renaissance in many regards. Despite the two successful colored teams trying to compete for multiple years beforehand (mostly due to Globetrotters owner Abe Saperstein failing to meet the public challenges he had in mind), the two teams would eventually be able to meet up in an unexpected manner due to the creation of the world’s first integrated professional basketball tournament. While there had been other world championship events been organized within the sport of basketball, what had been in mind with the World Professional Basketball Tournament being closer to living up to its name was that this would be the very first time both black and white teams would compete for a national title with both the Rens and Globetrotters participating in this tournament. The Globetrotters had to win two games, while the Renaissance had to win just one before they had to go up against each other in the semifinal round to settle a years-long rivalry that had never been played beforehand. Following that match-up, the Renaissance would compete against the National Basketball League's Oshkosh All-Stars, a team that had previously beaten the Rens 17 out of 33 times beforehand. Following the championship match's conclusion, most major news outlets of the time would decide to not cover the results of that final match, with only African American outlets truly covering the event for them. During a celebratory dinner party, Bob Douglas gave his team jackets saying "World's Colored Champions 1939" to celebrate his team's victory, with John Isaacs cutting off the word "Colored" with a razor blade on his jacket to explain that they were real champions.

== Interviews ==
This film includes several noteworthy interviews, including with: Rev. Al Sharpton, Maya Angelou, Cornel West, Rev. Jesse Jackson, Richard Lapchick, Spike Lee, Bob Costas, Dick Enberg, Charles Barkley, John Wooden, David Stern, Bill Russell, Dr. J, Clyde Drexler, Carmelo Anthony
