= Washington High School (Washington, Indiana) =

Location
- 608 East Walnut Street; Washington, Indiana 47501; United States; 38°39′33″N 87°10′05″W

Information
- Type: Public high school
- Established: 1837; 189 years ago
- Locale: City
- School district: Washington Community School Corporation
- Superintendent: Kevin Frank
- Principal: Brian Holland
- Grades: 9–12
- Enrollment: 813 (2023–2024)
- Color
- Fight song: Washington Hatchet Fight Song
- Athletics conference: PAC
- Nickname: Hatchets, Lady Hatchets
- Feeder schools: Washington Junior High School
- Gym Capacity: 7,090
- Website: whs.washingtoncommunityschools.org

Washington High School is a public high school in Washington, Indiana, United States. Its athletic mascot is "The Hatchets." The school's primary colors are old gold and black. WHS plays in the Pocket Athletic Conference (PAC) and is a 3A School in Athletics.

== Notable alumni ==
- Homer E. Capehart – United States Senator from Indiana (1945–1963)
- Chuck Harmon – first African-American to play for Cincinnati Reds (1954–1956), who was also an All-American basketball player at University of Toledo
- Big Dave DeJernett – first African-American to lead an integrated basketball championship team at statewide level or higher; Indiana's first black college basketball star before playing professionally for the Chicago Crusaders and New York Renaissance
- Leo Klier – two-time first team All-American basketball player at Notre Dame
- Craig Neal – retired NBA player, former head coach of the New Mexico Lobos men's basketball team, top assistant coach of the Nevada Wolf Pack men's basketball team
- Cody Zeller – 2011 Indiana Mr. Basketball, 2010 and 2011 3A State Finals MVP. Played for the Indiana Hoosiers and selected fourth overall by the Charlotte Bobcats in the NBA draft
- Luke Zeller – 2005 Indiana Mr. Basketball, 2005 McDonald's All American, 3A State finals MVP, played for Notre Dame
- Tyler Zeller – 2008 Indiana Mr. Basketball, 2008 McDonald's All American, Indiana's Gatorade Player of the Year, 3A State finals MVP. Played for North Carolina's 2009 NCAA championship team

== See also ==
- List of high schools in Indiana
