= Zack Clayton =

American basketball player (1913–1997)

Personal information
- Born: April 17, 1913 Gloucester County, Virginia, U.S.
- Died: November 20, 1997 (aged 84) Philadelphia, Pennsylvania, U.S.

Career information
- High school: Simon Gratz (Philadelphia, Pennsylvania)

Career history
- 1934–1935: Chicago Crusaders
- 1935–1936: Philadelphia Palais Royal Big Five
- 1935–1936: Philadelphia Commanders
- 1935–1936: New York Renaissance
- 1935–1936: Harlem Globetrotters
- 1936–1937: Philadelphia Commanders
- 1936–1937: Philadelphia Giants
- 1937–1938: Harlem Globetrotters
- 1938–1945: New York Renaissance
- 1941–1942: Philadelphia Toppers
- 1942–1947: Washington Bears
- 1943–1944: Harlem Globetrotters
- 1945–1946: Harlem Globetrotters
- 1946–1947: New York Renaissance
- 1946–1947: Hazleton Mountaineers
- 1947–1948: Philadelphia Lumberjacks
- 1948–1949: Worcester Table-Talk
- Basketball Hall of Fame
- Collegiate Basketball Hall of Fame

Zachary M. Clayton (April 17, 1913 – November 20, 1997) was a basketball player for the New York Rens. He was also a Negro league baseball player and a professional boxing referee. He was inducted into the Naismith Memorial Basketball Hall of Fame in 2017.

As a boy, Clayton's family moved from Virginia to Philadelphia. Clayton played at the Christian Street YMCA along with Charles "Tarzan" Cooper, Jackie Bethards and Bill Yancey. There they began four fruitful careers on a squad called the Tribune Men. Clayton also played for the Harlem Globetrotters. Clayton would win world championships with both teams. Clayton is enshrined in the Philadelphia basketball Hall of Fame. Clayton later became a boxing referee. His most famous bout was the 1974 Ali-Foreman "Rumble In The Jungle". Clayton also refereed Muhammad Ali's last fight, against Trevor Berbick in 1981. Clayton was a lieutenant in the Philadelphia Fire Department for 26 years. He retired in 1979.
