= ICC AllStars =

The ICC AllStars was an early integrated professional basketball team of the barnstorming era led by David DeJernett. In 1935 DeJernett finished his fourth year of eligibility at Indiana Central College (now the University of Indianapolis) and started a pro career with former teammates from Indiana Central as well as Washington (IN) High School. The ICC All-Stars also featured Burl Friddle, a Franklin Wonder Fiver and Twenties pro who had coached DeJernett in high school.

Rounding out the ICC AllStars were guards Billy Schaeffer and Harry Spurgeon, both native Hoosiers from Southern Indiana who had played at Indiana Central, and forwards Jack "Red" Heavenridge, Eugene Gilmore, and Paul Gross. In the 1930s seven-man professional touring squads of former amateur teammates were not uncommon; the New York Renaissance club, for example, was known as the "Magnificent Seven" and included several players who'd been schoolboy teammates in Philadelphia. Similarly, the Harlem Globetrotters originated amongst teammates at Wendell St Phillips High School in Chicago. Instead of an all-white or all-black team, however, the ICC AllStars played integrated basketball ahead of the other pro clubs. The NBL's Buffalo Bisons followed suit the next season when Hank Williams joined their starting lineup.

The ICC AllStars' most prominent win was a 40–35 victory over the Jasper Coca-Colas, champions of the Louisville-based Major Falls Cities League, in late March 1935, behind DeJernett's 18 points. The Cokes, featuring Purdue captain Ray Eddy, Indiana University stars Woody Weir and Vic Dauer, and Akron Firestone veteran Tom Rea, had defeated the AllStars 33–31 in an earlier match and the next year beat the powerful New York Rens 57–53.
