= John Holt (basketball) =

American basketball player

John Andrew "Casey" Holt Jr. (September 24, 1909 - February 12, 1940) was an American basketball player, part of the New York Renaissance, which was also known as the Harlem Rens.

The Rens were elected to the Basketball Hall of Fame in 1963 as a team, with three of the players and their coach also being selected as individuals. Holt was a member of the 1932–33 team that won 88 straight games and was called the magnificent 7.

After retiring from professional basketball, Holt became a patrolman for the New York City Police Department. While responding to a burglary on February 19, 1940, he was mistaken for the thief by other officers and mistakenly shot and killed.

== See also ==
- Black Fives
