= Omaha Civic Auditorium =

Multi-purpose hall and convention center in Omaha, Nebraska, United States

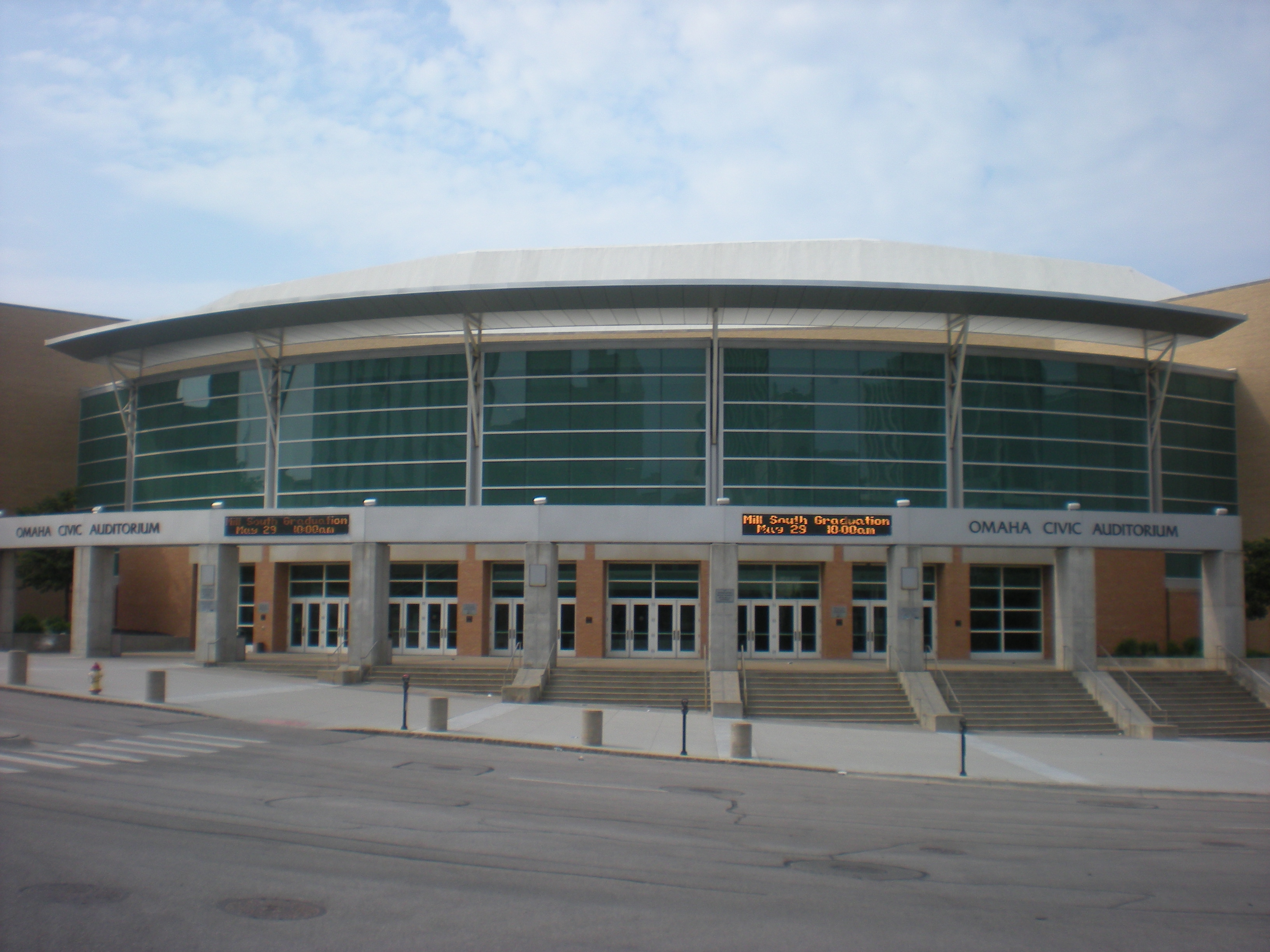
- The auditorium in 2010
- Interactive map of Omaha Civic Auditorium
- Address: 1804 Capitol Avenue
- Location: Omaha, Nebraska
- Coordinates: 41°15′42″N 95°56′24″W
- Owner: City of Omaha
- Operator: Metropolitan Entertainment & Convention Authority (MECA)
- Capacity: Arena: Concerts: 10,960; Basketball: 9,300; Music Hall: 2,453
- Surface: multi-surface
- Public transit: Metro Transit

Construction
- Opened: 1954
- Closed: June 2014
- Demolished: 2016
- Architect: Leo A. Daly
- Main contractor: Kiewit Corporation

Omaha Civic Auditorium was a multi-purpose convention center located in Downtown Omaha, Nebraska, United States. Opened in 1954, it surpassed the Ak-Sar-Ben Coliseum as the largest convention/entertainment complex in the city, until the completion of CHI Health Center in 2003. With the opening of the Ralston Arena in 2012, all teams that played at the Civic Auditorium moved, which reduced the venue's viability. The auditorium closed its doors in June 2014 and was demolished two years later.

== History ==
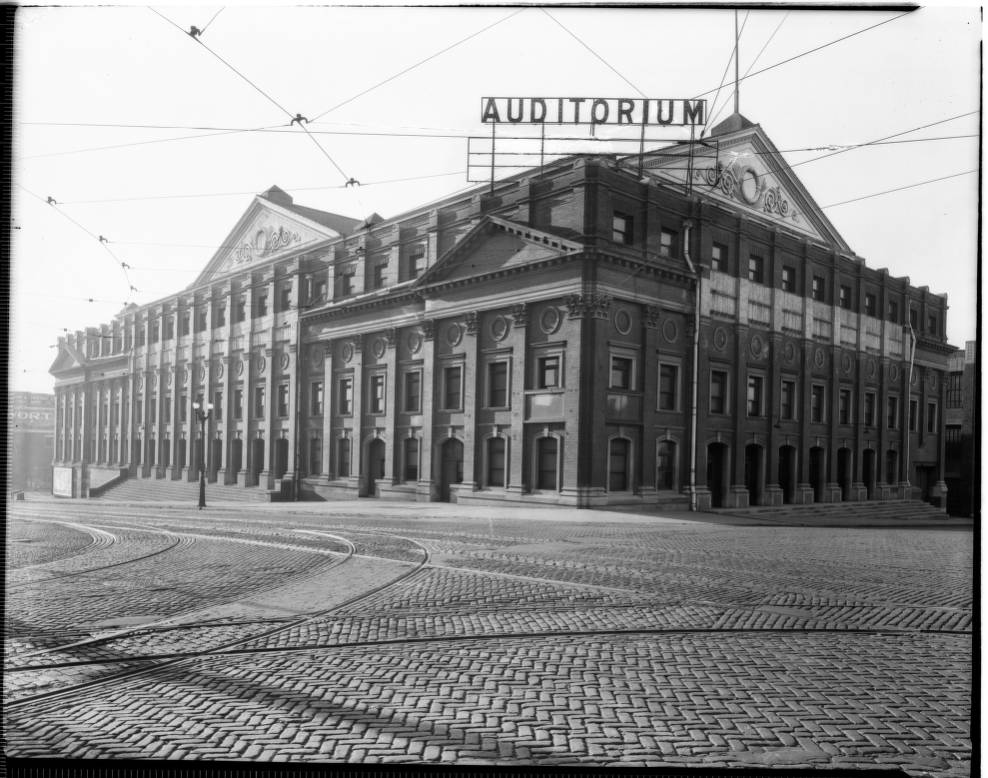
The Old Barn in 1923

=== Predecessor ===
The Omaha Civic Auditorium was preceded by the original Omaha City Auditorium. Omaha City Auditorium opened in 1901 and was designed by John Latenser Sr. Nicknamed the "Old Barn," it was an all-purpose venue, and had a large aesthetic appeal. In spite of its labels, by 1920, it was described as inadequate for the city of Omaha. Many began to avoid it. After its replacement, the Omaha Civic Auditorium, opened in 1954, it was demolished and was replaced with the headquarters of the Omaha Police Department.

=== Construction and Opening ===
The Omaha Civic Auditorium was unveiled in September 1951. Originally known as the Omaha City Auditorium, the new auditorium was designed by Leo A. Daly and would cost an estimated $5 million. The auditorium replaced a previous auditorium, which was built in 1901 and is now the site of the Omaha Police Department. Site preparation began in August 1952 and the building would be built by Kiewit Corporation. Omaha Civic Auditorium was officially dedicated on January 2, 1955.

=== George Wallace Riot ===
George Wallace (1919–1998) was a populist segregationist who ran a third-party presidential campaign to enhance the political clout of segregationist Southern leaders. On March 4, 1968, he came to Omaha to speak at the Civic Auditorium. The space in the auditorium had a limit of 3,400 people but more than 5,000 were admitted. Omahans packed in to support the candidate, except for a group of African American and white protesters seated at the foot of the stage. Many were youth with the Omaha NAACP, the DePorres Club and other protest organizations.

At the apex of the speech, some of the protesters tore up signs they were waving and threw them on the stage, while others released stink bombs filling the auditorium with a foul odor. Police began attacking the protesters and brutalized them in front of the audience's applause. Fleeing the auditorium for safety, rioting ensued along North 24th Street, the main thoroughfare in Omaha's Black neighborhood. Civil unrest continued for days afterward, and Wallace's visit is attributed to the destruction of the neighborhood, further decimation of relations between the Omaha Police Department and the Black community, and more.

Afterward, the main story in the Omaha World-Herald was recalled as “almost a press release from the Wallace campaign, and yes that’s the way political journalism was back then, but it didn’t have any context.”

=== Renovation, Closure, and Demolition ===
In 1995, renovations and construction for an additional parking garage began. Discussions for a new auditorium preceded renovations. However, they were cancelled in favor of expansion. Renovations were completed by 1997. In 2003, Omaha Civic Auditorium was replaced by Qwest Center to become the city's largest convention/entertainment complex.

Omaha Civic Auditorium closed in 2014. Demolition was originally to happen in 2015. However, demolition was delayed. Omaha Civic Auditorium was demolished in 2016. The site has been vacant since 2016 and will currently be redeveloped into the mixed-use development Civic Square.

== Facilities ==
=== Arena ===
The Civic Auditorium arena seated up to 9,300 people for sporting events and up to 10,960 people for concerts.

=== Omaha Civic Auditorium Music Hall ===
The Omaha Civic Auditorium Music Hall was located on the east side of Omaha Civic Auditorium and was used for concerts, Broadway shows and other events. It seated 2,453 and was known for its intimate yet casual atmosphere.

=== Exhibit Hall ===
The Civic Auditorium Exhibit Hall featured 43,400 square feet (4,000 m^{2}) of space for conventions and trade shows.

=== Mancuso Hall ===
Mancuso Hall was a large-events venue used for parties, trade shows, concerts, banquets, and conventions, among other events. 25,000 square feet (2300 m^{2}) of space, Mancuso Hall seated 2,500 for concerts and 1,500 for banquets.

== Notable events ==
In the past, the arena was home to the Creighton Bluejays men's basketball team, the Creighton women's basketball and volleyball teams, and the University of Nebraska Omaha hockey team, and the Kansas City(–Omaha) Kings NBA basketball team.

The arena was the site of the Missouri Valley Conference men's basketball tournament title game in 1978. It was also the site of the seventh WWF In Your House pay-per-view in 1996. Billy Graham's Nebraska Crusade took place at the arena in 1964.

=== One of Elvis Presley's final concerts ===
One of Elvis Presley's final concerts was held at the Civic Auditorium on June 19, 1977. The concert was filmed for a CBS TV special, Elvis in Concert.

=== "You're no Jack Kennedy" ===
A notable event at the Civic Auditorium was the 1988 U.S. vice-presidential debate between Democrat Lloyd Bentsen and Republican Dan Quayle. The debate produced one of the most famous quotes in American political history.

Quayle, then a U.S. Senator from Indiana, had been a relative political unknown and reporters covering the campaign wondered if he would make a suitable president if something were to have happened to George H. W. Bush, who selected him as his running mate. In response to a question, Quayle pointed out that he had as much experience in the Senate as John F. Kennedy had prior to being elected President of the United States in 1960. To which, Bentsen, a Senate veteran from Texas, responded: "Senator, I served with Jack Kennedy, I knew Jack Kennedy, Jack Kennedy was a friend of mine. Senator, you're no Jack Kennedy."

=== Frazier vs. Stander : World's Heavyweight Championship ===
On May 25, 1972, Ron Stander, a ranked heavyweight contender from Council Bluffs, Iowa, known as "The Bluffs Butcher", fought the champion, Joe Frazier, for the World Heavyweight Championship, to a sold-out house. After Stander won the first round, he received severe cuts to his face, calling for ring doctor, Jack Lewis, to ask referee, Zack Clayton to stop the contest, before the fifth-round bell. Stander received seventeen stitches to close the cuts. This was Frazier's last title defense before his loss to George Foreman, the following year.

== See also ==
- CHI Health Center Omaha, which replaced the Auditorium as the city's major indoor arena
- Baxter Arena, which opened in 2015 and filled the market niche left behind by the Auditorium
- Mid-America Center
- Rosenblatt Stadium (defunct)
- Ak-Sar-Ben (arena) (defunct)
- Charles Schwab Field Omaha
- Morrison Stadium
- Ralston Arena

Events and tenants
Preceded by None	Home of the Omaha Ak-Sar-Ben Knights; 2005 – 07	Succeeded by iWireless Center
Preceded by Cincinnati Gardens	Home of the Kansas City-Omaha Kings (with Municipal Auditorium (Kansas City); 1972 – 75	Succeeded by Kemper Arena
