= James Ricks =

James Ricks may refer to:

- James B. Ricks, American jurist and politician
- James "Pappy" Ricks, American basketball player

== See also ==
- Jim Ricks, American and Irish conceptual artist, writer, and curator
