= Fats Jenkins =

American baseball and basketball player

- Outfielder
- Born: January 10, 1898; New York, New York, U.S.
- Died: December 6, 1968 (aged 70); Philadelphia, Pennsylvania, U.S.
- Batted: Left Threw: Left

Negro league baseball debut
- 1920, for the New York Lincoln Giants

Last appearance
- 1940, for the Philadelphia Stars
- Stats at Baseball Reference

Teams
- New York Lincoln Giants (1920); Bacharach Giants (1922); Harrisburg Giants (1923–27); New York Lincoln Giants (1928); Philadelphia Hilldale Giants (1928); Bacharach Giants (1928–29); New York Lincoln Giants (1930); Baltimore Black Sox (1930); New York Black Yankees (1931–34); Brooklyn Eagles (1935); New York Black Yankees (1936–38); Pittsburgh Crawfords (1938); Washington Black Senators (1938); Philadelphia Stars (1940)

Fats Jenkins
Career information
- Playing career: 1914–1940
- Position: Point Guard

Career history
- 1914–1921: New York-St. Christopher Incorporators
- 1921–1924: New York Commonwealth Big Five
- 1923–1924: Pittsburgh Loendi Big Five
- 1924–1939: New York Rens
- 1939–1940: Chicago Crusaders

Clarence Reginald Jenkins (January 10, 1898 – December 6, 1968), nicknamed "Fats", was an American professional baseball and basketball player from about 1920 to 1940. He played when both professional sports were racially segregated as an African-American. Primarily he played left field in baseball's Negro leagues, and point guard for the barnstorming New York Renaissance on the hardwood, where he was also team captain. He was inducted into the Naismith Memorial Basketball Hall of Fame as part of the Class of 2021.

Jenkins' .333 career batting average is the highest officially listed career average of any player not elected to the Baseball Hall of Fame.

== Biography ==
Jenkins was born in New York City where he played basketball for the St. Christopher's Club youth team and then for the first teams that were named "Colored Basketball World's Champions" by the New York Age in 1917, 1918 and 1919. Next he played for the top team of the early 1920s, Cum Posey's Loendi Big Five based in Pittsburgh, and for the New York Renaissance, the last of the Colored World Champions in 1925. From that season through 1939 he captained the "Rens", whom the Basketball Hall of Fame inducted collectively in 1963. In the 1939–40 season Fats captained the powerful Chicago Crusaders which included his old Rens teammate David "Big Dave" DeJernett as well as future Ren Bricktop Wright. The all-black Crusaders were said to be "sidestepped" from the Chicago World's Pro Tourney that spring, perhaps because Jenkins and Wright had abruptly left the team in a huff over giving sparkplug Agis Bray sufficient playing time,

Meanwhile, Jenkins played Negro league baseball more than twenty seasons with numerous teams based in New York, New Jersey, Pennsylvania, and Maryland; he may be most often associated with the New York Black Yankees, although he managed Brooklyn in 1940. His known career batting and on-base averages are .325 and .392. The East-West All-Star Game was established during his fourteenth season, and he played in the first and third renditions. He was a quick outfielder and baserunner, which fits his denomination as the fastest man in basketball.

Jenkins died at age 70 in Philadelphia, Pennsylvania.
