= Smart Set Athletic Club =

Athletic club

The Smart Set Athletic Club was an athletic club based in Brooklyn, NY. The club organized the first African-American basketball team, one of the most successful teams in the Black Fives Era.

== History ==
Founded in 1904, the Smart Set Athletic Club is credited with assembling the first formal fully independent African-American basketball team. The team debuted in 1907. The Smart Set Athletic Club team was also a founding member of the Olympian Athletic League, along with the Alpha Physical Culture Club, the Marathon Athletic Club of Manhattan, and the St. Christopher Club.

Smart Set members came from a background of well-educated, affluent African Americans who resided in what at the time was a predominantly white Stuyvesant Heights neighborhood of Brooklyn.
