= Chicago Crusaders =

US all-black barnstorming basketball club

The Chicago Crusaders were an all-black barnstorming basketball club whose history ran from 1933 through 1947. Commonly billed as the "Western World's Colored Champions" the team's roster over the years featured about a dozen players who also were members of the better-known Harlem Globetrotters and New York Renaissance, both enshrined in the Basketball Hall of Fame.

== History ==
=== 1933–34 season ===
In the 1933–34 season Dick Hudson, who had previously managed the seminal Giles Post Legion and Savoy Big Five squads that had helped birth Abe Saperstein's Globetrotters, converted his Hottentots into the Chicago Crusaders as something of a travelling name for the Savoy Big Five. Players that season included Jackie Bethards, Al Johnson, Big Jack Mann, and Zack Clayton.

=== 1934–35 season ===
In 1934–35 the Crusaders made a highly successful barnstorming tour of the Eastern USA, in contravention of the more-common practice of Eastern Seaboard clubs such as the Original Celtics and Rens touring the cavernous MidWestern gyms. Their record that year was reported to be 112–10, including wins over such clubs back East as the Honey Russell All-Stars and Clarksville Oilers.

=== 1935–37 seasons ===
After a successful 1935–36 campaign, the 1936–37 Crusaders, now managed by Mahlon Roles, adopted the moniker of the Palmer House Indians, competing locally in Chicago's Windy City League. The Indians played their home games at then-brand-new DuSable High School, winning a dozen straight to start the season before dropping a disappointing 53–31 decision to the visiting Rens. In this season the Crusaders notably added David "Big Dave" DeJernett to their squad, making an early "Twin Towers" between DeJernett and former schoolboy rival Jack Mann. Bob "Red" Bolton of Colgate University was another high-profile addition at guard.

=== 1939–40 season ===
In 1939–40 the Crusaders presented perhaps their strongest edition ever, as DeJernett and Al Johnson continued to start along with legendary Rens star Fats Jenkins plus Agis Bray and Hillery Brown, both former Chicago Collegians. Late in the season the Crusaders were reported to have been "sidestepped" by the promoters of the Chicago World's Pro Tourney, which had been inaugurated the previous Spring & won by the Rens. The Pro Tourney took great pains to seed the Rens and Globetrotters in the same semifinal bracket to ensure that two black clubs would not meet in the Final for the World's title. This may have been a decisive factor in "sidestepping" the Crusaders' chances to compete in the local tournament.

=== November 1940 ===
In November 1940 the Harlem Globetrotters, who had won the 1940 World's title, announced that they had entered a type of player-exchange agreement with the now-redubbed Savoy Big Five. Most of the 1940 Crusaders—DeJernett, Bray, Johnson, Brown—were listed as parties to this exchange agreement. Although Abe Saperstein had spoken for years of his "farm team" this was the first verifiable instance of the Crusaders' taking a subordinate position to the Globetrotter unit. Within a few months Brown and Bray were regularly starting and leading the Trotters' first unit in scoring. The Savoy Big Five by the winter of 1941 was regularly playing games billed as the Harlem Globetrotters—effectively becoming the Trotters' first official second touring unit.

=== Chicago Monarchs ===
Over the next six years the Crusaders occasionally played with one of their oldtime names such as Bray or Johnson as stars. Crusader-related players such as Brown or Mann also were commonly found to play for Thirties-reminiscent squads called the Chicago Collegians, the Olde-Tymers, or under the new moniker of the Chicago Monarchs.
