= Eyre Saitch =

American basketball player (1905–1985)

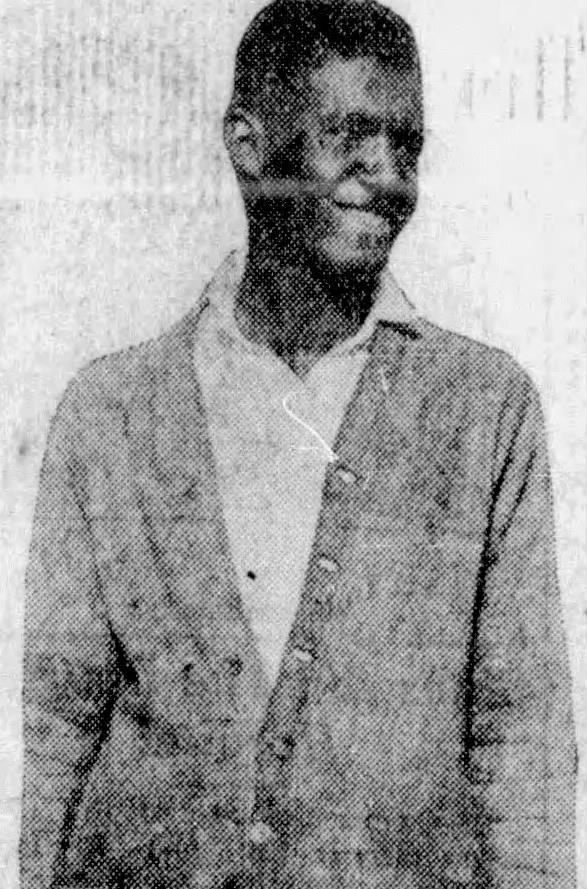
Saitch, c. 1927

Eyre Saitch (February 20, 1905 in Pembroke Parish, Bermuda – November 28, 1985 in New Jersey) was an American professional basketball player. He was a member of the New York Renaissance basketball team, and part of the first black team to win a world championship in basketball. He would win over 2000 games with the team. He along with his team was enshrined in the Naismith Memorial Basketball Hall of Fame. Erye was a national level tennis player who would win a national title in tennis. Erye died in 1985. He won a 1926 American Tennis Association singles title. Sylvester Smith served as Saitch's doubles partner. During his career he was also known as Bruiser Saitch.
