= John Isaacs =

Panamanian-American basketball player

Personal information
- Born: September 15, 1915 Rio Sidra, Panama
- Died: January 26, 2009 (aged 93) Bronx, New York, U.S.
- Listed height: 6 ft 3 in (1.91 m)
- Listed weight: 190 lb (86 kg)

Career information
- High school: Textile (Manhattan, New York)
- Position: Guard

Career history
- 1935–1936: St. Peter Claver Penguins
- 1935–1936: New York Harlem Giants
- 1936–1937: New York Collegians
- 1936–1943: New York Rens
- 1941–1942: Philadelphia Toppers
- 1941–1947: Washington Bears
- 1942–1945: Long Island Grumman Flyers/Hellcats
- 1943–1944: Harlem Globetrotters
- 1946–1947: Hazleton Mountaineers
- 1946–1947: Orange
- 1947–1949: Utica Olympics
- 1948–1949: Brooklyn Gothams
- 1949: Dayton Rens
- 1950–1951: Saratoga Harlem Yankees
- 1950–1951: Glen Falls / Saratoga

Career highlights
- 2× WPBT champion (1939, 1943)
- Basketball Hall of Fame

John William Isaacs (September 15, 1915 – January 26, 2009) was a Panamanian-American professional basketball player. Born in Panama but raised in New York City, he was a member of the New York Renaissance, the Washington Bears, and various other teams.

== Life and career ==
Isaacs was born in 1915 in Panama to a Jamaican father and a Panamanian mother. He grew up bilingual in Harlem, speaking English. Isaacs was a 6'3", 190 lbs. guard who led the basketball team at Textile High School (later Charles Evans Hughes High School) to a title in the 1935 New York City High School Basketball championship with all-City honors for himself. Offered a professional contract by Bob Douglas, owner of the Harlem-based, all-African American New York Renaissance basketball team, he accepted the offer, but only after getting approval from his mother.

With the Rens, Isaacs led the team to season records of 122–19, 121–19, and 127–15. The team won the first World Professional Basketball Tournament, held in 1939 at Chicago Stadium and sponsored by the Chicago Herald American, with the team making it to the finals by beating the Harlem Globetrotters of Chicago 27–23, to face the Oshkosh All-Stars, who lost to the Rens 34–25 in the tournament final. Isaacs won a second title in 1943 with the Washington Bears, again defeating Oshkosh. Isaacs scored a game-high 11 points to lead the Bears to a 43–31 win and their first title. Paid $175 per month, plus expenses, to play basketball. Isaacs supplemented his professional salary with jobs on the assembly line at Grumman Aircraft and at New York Life Insurance during the off season.

Isaacs played with several other all-black professional basketball teams after his time with the Rens and Bears, including the Manhattan Nationals, Hazleton Mountaineers of the Eastern Professional Basketball League, and Utica Olympics of the New York State Professional Basketball League), and in the American Basketball League with Brooklyn and Saratoga. He became a coach and mentor after he retired. Chris Mullin admitted that he was one of his disciples.

Long after retiring from professional sports, Isaacs won medals at the New York State Senior Games in tennis, Frisbee, softball throwing, as well as in basketball.

On February 14, 2015, Isaacs was announced as a member of that year's induction class of the Naismith Memorial Basketball Hall of Fame. He formally entered the Hall on September 11.
