= Renaissance Ballroom & Casino =

Former music venue in Manhattan, New York

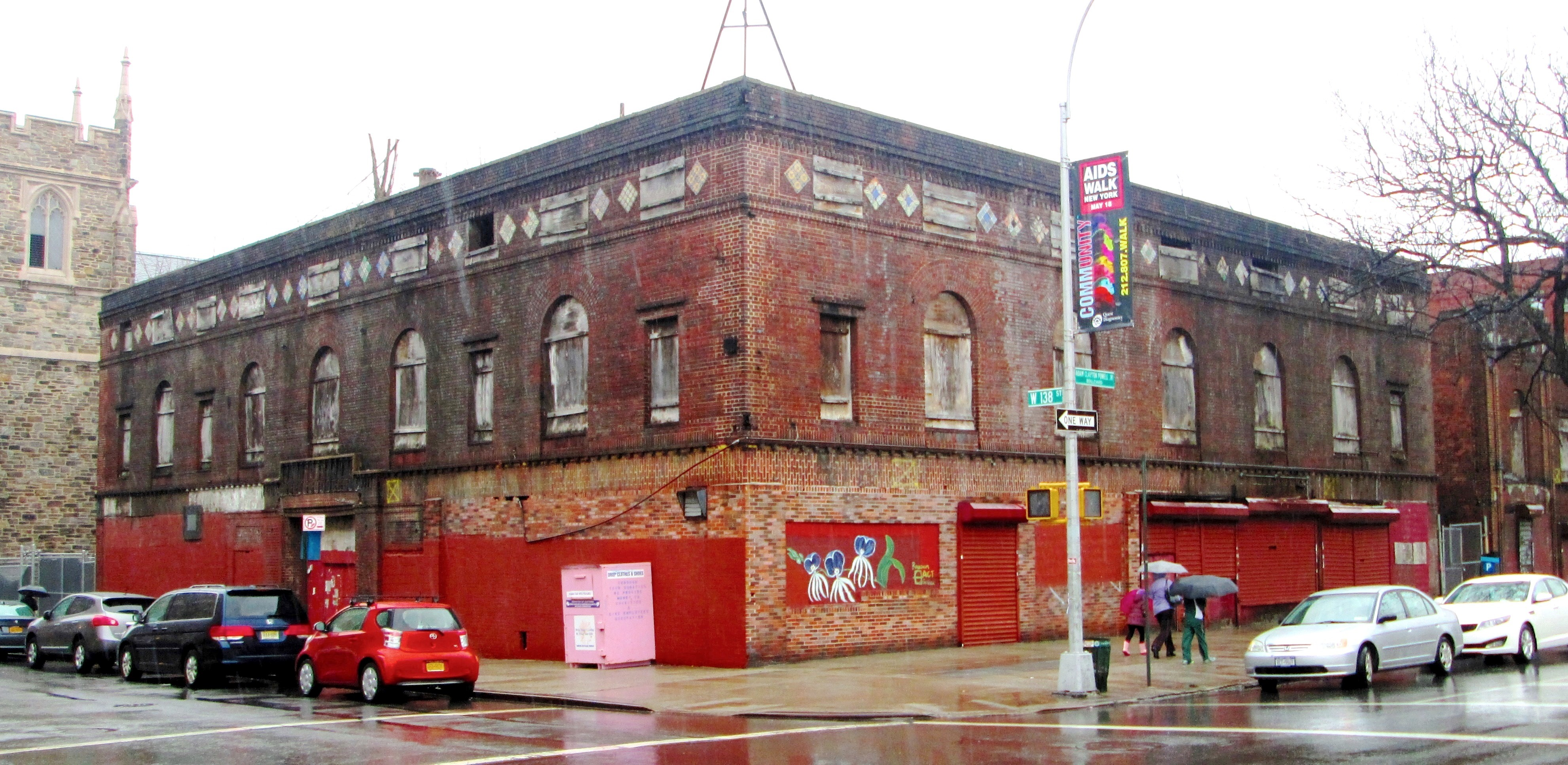
- The Harlem Renaissance Entertainment Complex
- Interactive map of Renaissance Ballroom & Casino
- Former names: Renaissance Casino Ballroom (1926)
- Address: 2341–2349 Adam Clayton Powell Jr. Boulevard; Harlem, Manhattan, New York City
- Coordinates: 40°49′1″N 73°56′31.5″W

Construction
- Opened: 1924
- Closed: 1979
- Demolished: 2015
- Architect: Harry Creighton Ingalls

The Renaissance Ballroom & Casino was an entertainment complex at 2341–2349 Adam Clayton Powell Jr. Boulevard (Seventh Avenue) in the Harlem neighborhood of Manhattan in New York City. When opened in 1921, it included a casino, ballroom, 900-seat theater, six retail stores, and a basketball arena. It spanned the entire eastern frontage of Adam Clayton Powell Jr. Boulevard between 137th and 138th Streets.

== History ==
The Renaissance Theatre Building, as it was originally named, opened January 1921. It was built and owned, until 1931, by African Americans. It was known as the "Rennie" (also spelled "Renny") and was an upscale reception hall. The "Renny" held prize fights, dance marathons, film screenings, concerts, and stage acts. It was also a meeting place for social clubs and political organizations in Harlem. They gathered to dance the popular dances at the time, the Charleston, Lindy Hop, and Black Bottom, to live music performed by well known jazz musicians. Jazz artists including Louis Armstrong, Fletcher Henderson, Duke Ellington, Count Basie, Cab Calloway, Lionel Hampton, Cootie Williams, Bessie Smith, Lena Horne, Billie Holiday and Ella Fitzgerald performed at the "Renny". In the 1920s, the Renaissance Ballroom was known as a "Black Mecca". It hosted Joe Louis fights. The ballroom was on the second floor of the entertainment complex.

The "Renny" was a significant entertainment center during the Harlem Renaissance, and the New Negro Movement in Harlem. When African-American culture and art flourished. historically important structure helped usher in the decade-long period of African-American cultural and artistic flourishing, which at the time was known as the New Negro Movement. William H. Roach (Note: William Howard Roach (surname later also spelled as Roche; 8 September 1881 Plymouth, Montserrat, British West Indies – September 1963 The Bronx) was a Montserratian-born-and-raised-turned-American entrepreneur noted for having been among the first African Americans to own real estate in Harlem. Roach led the development and was the founding owner-manager of the Renaissance Theatre which opened in 1921, and its add-on, the Renaissance Casino, which opened in 1923) from Antigua, Cleophus Charity and Joseph H. Sweeney from Montserrat were the founding builders of the Renaissance Complex. They were members of Marcus Garvey’s Universal Negro Improvement Association (UNIA).

== Developers, owners, and operators ==
The African-American owned and operated firm, The Sarco Realty & Holding Company, Inc., raised the funds for the project by selling shares to the public, initially, in February 1920, at 10¢ a share. Sarco's executive directors were William H. Roach, president and general manager; Cleo Charity (1889–1964), vice-president and treasurer; Cornelius Charity, second vice-president; and Joseph Henry Sweeney (1889–1932), secretary. The other directors were John Blake, Edmund Osborne, Shervington Lee, and Edward B. Lynch. Sarco Realty and the R. Holding Company, of which Roach was also President, purchased the land. Sarco contracted Isaac A. Hopper's Sons to erect the Renaissance Theatre building, at a cost of $175,000. Sarco Realty owned and managed the building until 1931; Sarco Realty also owned and operated the Renaissance Casino and Theatre until 1931.

== Original design ==
The Renaissance was designed by Harry Creighton Ingalls, who also designed the Henry Miller and Little Theatres in the Theater District. The design was Moorish with glazed tile and palladian windows. The complex had a ballroom, a billiard parlor, stores, and a restaurant called China House. There was a basketball team known as Harlem Rens. The theater had 900-seats and featured movies by Oscar Micheaux, the first African American to produce feature-length films. It was used by the NAACP for an Anti-lynching movement meeting in 1923.

=== Neighborhood of historic jazz venues ===
The Renaissance Ballroom was one of several legendary Harlem jazz venues in the 1920s. Others included the Uptown Cotton Club, Connie's Inn, and the Savoy Ballroom. The "Rennie" was open to African Americans, while some of the other well clubs in Harlem did not cater to African Americans.

=== Notable events and mementos ===
In 1953, David Dinkins — who served as the first African-American mayor of New York from 1990 to 1993 — had his wedding reception at the Renny.

In the 1990s, the location was used in Spike Lee's film Jungle Fever as a backdrop for a crack den.

=== Cessation of operations ===
The Renaissance Complex closed in 1979. In 1989, The Renny was purchased by the Abyssinian Development Corporation, an organization established in 1989 as a nonprofit corporation. Abyssinian Development Corporation had planned to restore the "Renny," which it did not do. In 1991 attempts were made for the Renaissance to become a landmark by the Landmarks Preservation Commission. It was agreed on but it did not happen.

=== Recent and current use ===
In May 2014 from Abyssinian Development Corporation sold the Renaissance Complex for $15 million.

In 2015, New York-based developer BRP secured a construction loan from Santander Bank for $53.2 million for the development of a mixed-income residential rental complex. The new building, called "The Renny", has an LEED-Silver certification with ecological structure features such as solar panels, a green roof, an energy-efficient boiler and water-saving plumbing

==== Community criticism of current use ====
Prior to commencing the construction of the new Renny in 2015, Harlem residents expressed concerns that the new structure (i) would not improve the African-American community in that area of Harlem and (ii) would destroy an important building related to the history of Harlem and to the history of the U.S.
