= James "Pappy" Ricks =

American basketball player

James Louis Ricks (January 21, 1900 – February 8, 1941) was an American basketball player for the New York Rens. The entire team was inducted into the Naismith Memorial Basketball Hall of Fame in 1963.

Ricks was born in Orange, New Jersey on January 21, 1900, the son of William and Amanda (née Scott) Ricks. He died of cancer in Brooklyn on February 8, 1941.

Ricks was one of the original members of the Rens. He would play with them from 1932 to 1936.

== See also ==
- Black Fives
