= Cumberland Posey =

American baseball player (1890–1946)

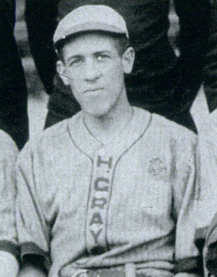
- Posey in 1913
- Outfielder / Manager / Owner
- Born: June 20, 1890; Homestead, Pennsylvania, U.S.
- Died: March 28, 1946 (aged 55); Pittsburgh, Pennsylvania, U.S.
- Batted: Right Threw: Right

Negro leagues (Note: On December 16, 2020, Major League Baseball declared the Negro leagues, from the span of 1920–1948, to be a "Major League". Posey's statistics reflect his time in the Negro leagues during the 1929, 1932, 1933, and 1935 seasons.) statistics
- Managerial record: 93–95–8
- Winning %: .495
- Managerial record at Baseball Reference

Teams
- Homestead Grays (1918–1935)

Career highlights and awards
- Washington Nationals Ring of Honor

Member of the National

Baseball Hall of Fame
- Induction: 2006
- Election method: Committee on African-American Baseball
Basketball career
Personal information
Born	October 25, 1890 Homestead, Pennsylvania, U.S.
Died	March 28, 1946 (aged 55) Pittsburgh, Pennsylvania, U.S.
Listed height	5 ft 9 in (1.75 m)
Career information
High school	Homestead (Homestead, Pennsylvania)
College	Penn State (1909–1911); Duquesne (1916–1918)
Career highlights
5× Colored Basketball World Champion (1912, 1920–1923); Pittsburgh City Champion (1908)
Basketball Hall of Fame

Cumberland Willis "Cum" Posey Jr. (June 20, 1890 – March 28, 1946) was an American professional baseball player, manager, and team owner in the Negro leagues, as well as a professional basketball player and team owner. He played basketball playing from the early 1900s through the mid-1920s and was renowned as the best African American player of his era.

== Early life ==
Cumberland Jr. was born into Western Pennsylvania's Negro elite, the son of Cumberland Willis Posey Sr. and Angelina "Anna" Stevens Posey of Homestead, adjacent to Pittsburgh. Posey Sr. worked on riverboats and, in 1877, became probably the first African American licensed engineer in the United States, earning a chief engineer license and the title of Captain. "Cap" Posey was a riverboat builder, general manager of the Dexter Coal Company, owner of the Diamond Coke and Coal Company, and industrial partner of Henry Clay Frick. He was president of the Loendi Social and Literary Club for three years and president of the Pittsburgh Courier newspaper for its first 14 years, to 1924.(Williams) The family lived in a palatial Italianate mansion on the heights.

Despite his commanding wealth, Captain Posey still had to deal with racial discrimination, according to historian William Serrin. In that crucible of race, his son began to excel as a young athlete.

In football, Cumberland Jr. was a star player and manager for semi-pro sandlot teams in the Pittsburgh area prior to 1910, including the Delaney Rifles and the Collins Tigers.

== Basketball ==
Posey was the best African American basketball player of his time, playing from the early 1900s (decade) through the mid-1920s. His peers and the sporting press considered him an "All-Time Immortal". "The mystic wand of Posey ruled basketball with as much eclat as 'Rasputin' dominated the Queen of all the Russias", observed the Harlem Interstate Tattler in 1929.

Posey led Homestead High to the 1908 city championship, played basketball at Penn State for two years, moved to the University of Pittsburgh where he earned a pharmacy degree in 1915, and formed the famous Monticello Athletic Association team that won the Colored Basketball World's Championship in 1912. He later played varsity basketball for Duquesne University, under the name "Charles Cumbert", and led the Dukes in scoring for three seasons through 1919. Today he is enshrined in the Duquesne Sports Hall of Fame under his real name.

During the mid-1910s, Posey formed, operated, and played for the Loendi Big Five, which became the most dominant basketball team of the Black Fives Era through the mid-1920s, winning four straight Colored Basketball World Championship titles. He retired from basketball in the late 1920s to focus exclusively on the business of baseball and on his weekly sports column in the Pittsburgh Courier, "In The Sportive Realm."

He was elected to the Naismith Memorial Basketball Hall of Fame in 2016.

== Homestead Grays ==
In baseball, Posey played with the Homestead Grays in 1911, was manager by 1916, and became owner in the early 1920s. In a quarter-century running the team, he built it into one of the powerhouse franchises of black baseball, winning numerous pennants, including nine consecutively from 1937 to 1945.

In 1910, a group of Homestead steelworkers was organized into one of baseball's greatest clubs by Posey. This team, the Homestead Grays, played many locations such as Forbes Field and Griffith Stadium in Washington, D.C. The team won eight out of nine Negro National League titles.

Posey, the principal owner of the Homestead Grays, was a player, manager, owner, and club official for 35 years (1911–1946). He established a barnstorming circuit, and the Grays operated as a profitable team in the East.

Posey began playing baseball for the semi-pro Grays in 1911. He soon ended his playing career to become field and business manager. He took control of the Grays in 1920 and turned them into a highly successful regional enterprise as an independent team. The Grays' strong identity in Pennsylvania and surrounding states enabled them to survive the depths of the Great Depression.

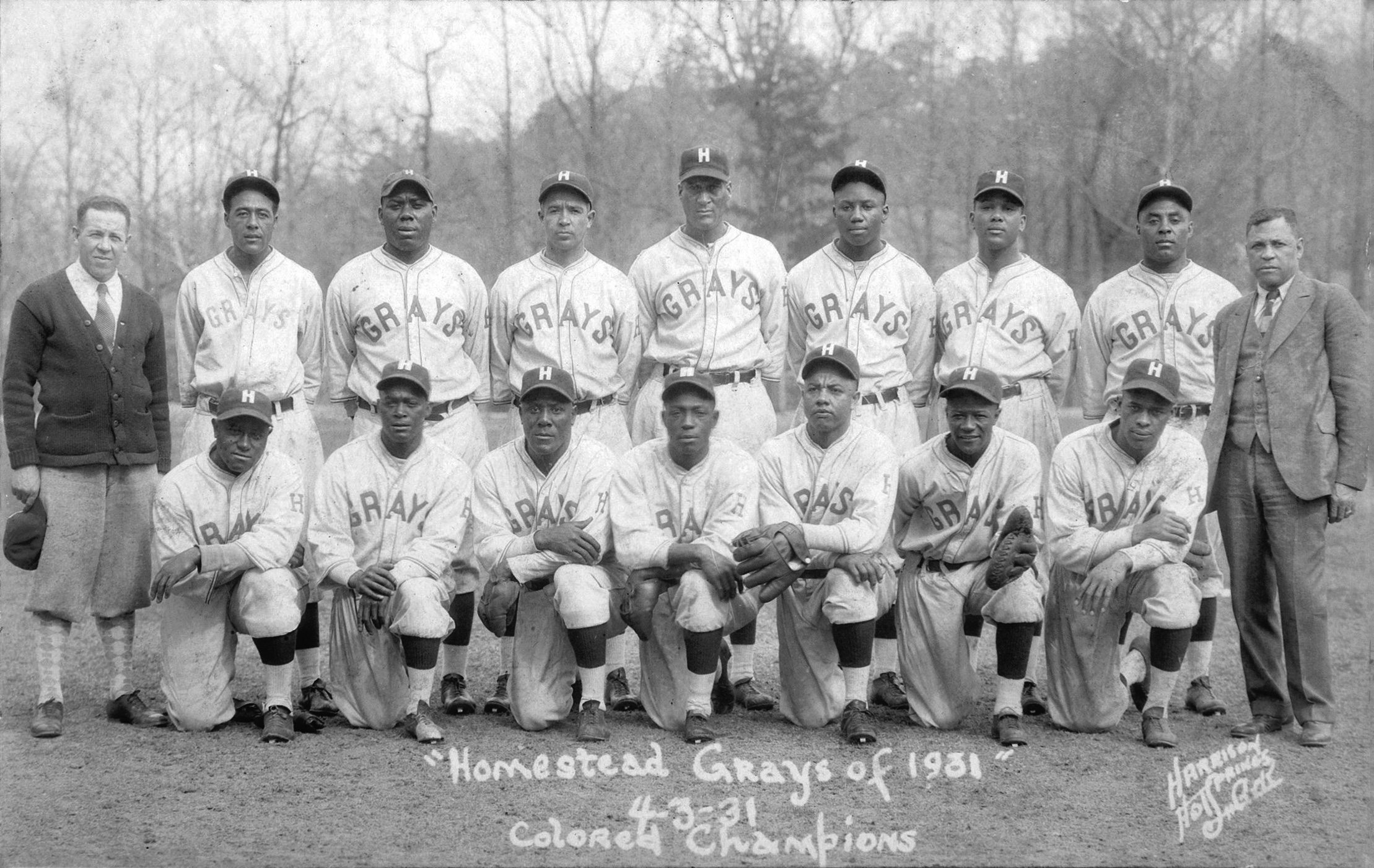
Posey, far left, with the 1931 Grays

Posey, an aggressive talent seeker with the Grays, at one time or another had over a dozen current Negro leagues Hall of Famers playing for him. He was often accused of raiding other clubs' rosters, enticing their best players to join his team. He suffered a heavy dose of the same in the early 1930s, when he lost several stars to the well-financed Pittsburgh Crawfords. The Grays rebounded and became a member of the second Negro National League in 1935, soon dominating the circuit. Posey's teams reeled in nine consecutive pennants from 1937 to 1945.

Posey unwisely attempted to start the East-West League in 1932, during the Depression, but it did not last the season. He later became an officer of the Negro National League, and was a major force at its meetings throughout the rest of his career. He also was a frequent critic of the league, both before and after joining it, in his regular sports columns for the Pittsburgh Courier, a leading black weekly newspaper.

Courier sportswriter Wendell Smith once wrote of Posey: "Some may say he crushed the weak as well as the strong on the way to the top of the ladder. But no matter what his critics say, they cannot deny that he was the smartest man in Negro baseball and certainly the most successful."

He was elected to the Baseball Hall of Fame in 2006.

He was named to the Washington Nationals Ring of Honor for his "significant contribution to the game of baseball in Washington, D.C.", as part of the Homestead Grays on August 10, 2010.

== Death ==
On March 28, 1946, Posey died of cancer in Pittsburgh at the age of 55. His hometown of Homestead declared a school holiday in his honor the day of his funeral.

== See also ==
- National Basketball Association
- Negro league baseball
