= David DeJernett =

American basketball player

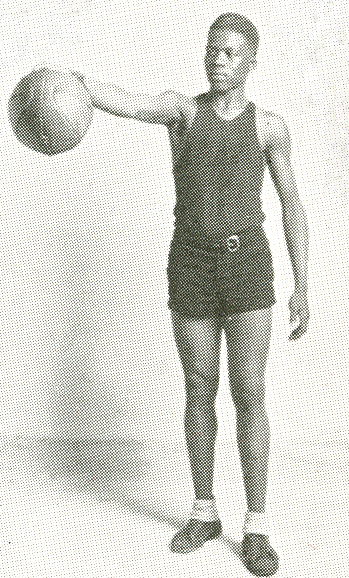
- Born: February 22, 1912; Garfield, Kentucky, U.S.
- Died: August 4, 1964 (aged 52)

Robert David "Big Dave" DeJernett (February 22, 1912 – August 4, 1964) was a pioneer in the integration of scholastic and collegiate basketball in the United States. He is best known for leading the integrated Washington Hatchets to the Indiana state title as a high school junior in the 1929–30 season.

== Early life and education ==
Born in Garfield, Kentucky, on February 22, 1912, DeJernett moved to Indiana as a baby, when his father John DeJernett was recruited to repair extensive flood damage on the B&O track line running from Cincinnati to St Louis. DeJernett attended segregated Dunbar Elementary in Washington, Indiana, before entering the public junior high school. The year DeJernett entered seventh grade the school hired young Burl Friddle, a Franklin Wonder Fiver, to become the Hatchets' new coach. Friddle's resume eventually included two state high school championships, a collegiate NIT finalist, and a head coaching job with the Indianapolis Jets of the NBA.

== High school career ==
Friddle was impressed by the size and talent of the 6-foot-3, 230-lb DeJernett and put him on the varsity squad for the 1928–29 season. The sixteen-year-old DeJernett posed for studio shots as a team newcomer by flashily palming the basketball, something rarely seen from teens or even pros, at a time when the ball was made of smooth leather and was slightly larger than it is today. As a sophomore DeJernett steadily improved over the course of the season, and after his Hatchets lost in the 1929 state finals he was named to the All-State team.

=== State final ===
In the 1929–30 season, DeJernett became the first African-American in US history to lead an integrated basketball team to a major tournament championship, as his Hatchets won an 800-school competition by beating the Muncie Central Bearcats 32–21 in the state Final in front of 15,000 screaming fans in Butler Fieldhouse, at the time the largest basketball venue in the USA. Muncie was also led by a black player, Jack Mann, who stood 6-foot-6 but could not outjump DeJernett. DeJernett controlled the center jumps against Mann which contributed largely to the victory. His feat made the nation's newspapers from New York to Nevada. As far away as China, DeJernett's picture appeared in Tientsin's North China Star.

=== National championship ===
Upon winning the state title, Friddle accepted a challenge from Coach Jimmy Kitts of the Athens, Texas, Hornets, who had won back-to-back national tournaments in Chicago sponsored by the legendary Amos Alonzo Stagg. The racial atmosphere was tense in those days. Stagg's tournament only accepted white teams that were either champions or runners-up in their state. Indiana had never sent its champion to this 'national' competition. Between the game in which DeJernett's team won the state title and the Athens challenge, the infamous Marion lynchings shamed Indiana. The Texans had likely never faced a black opponent on the hardwood prior to meeting DeJernett. DeJernett tied the Hornets' hook-shot-specializing Center Freddie Tompkins for game honors with 11 points as his Hatchets won the "world" title with a thrilling 28–26 victory.

=== Death threats, The Klan ===
In the 1930–31 season DeJernett's Hatchets were favored to win a second crown, against understandably fierce opposition. The day before an important regional match against traditional rival Vincennes DeJernett received a letter signed by the "Committee of Fourteen, KKK" that threatened his life if he "so much as touched" a rival white player in Vincennes, ominously making reference to the Marion tragedy of some months previous. Nonetheless "Big Dave" shrugged off the threat and poured in 14 points to lead his team to a 22–19 victory over Vincennes. The local newspaper joked that "too bad the Committee didn't have forty members"—as DeJernett had succeeded in scoring a point for each cowardly racist behind the letter.

As a further rebuff to the Klan, two weeks later Knute Rockne and Griz Wagner were featured speakers at a banquet of unity honoring both the champion Hatchets and 1931 Catholic Boys' State Champion Washington Catholic Cardinals. After his speech closed the banquet Rockne shook hands with each of the championship fives, but DeJernet, suspecting that Rockne might not want to shake hands with a black man, passed on by. Rockne ostentatiously grabbed Big Dave by the hand and shook to cap off the evening as well as his heroic career, as within two days he would die in a plane crash.

In 1930–31, DeJernett made All-State for the third consecutive year, but his Hatchets lost in the state finals to Mann's Muncie squad, which went on to claim the title. After back-to-back season-ending showdowns DeJernett and Mann were later recalled as having been "Gold Dust Twins thrusting and parrying like two skillful fencers," their pivot duels foreshadowing future celebrated center rivalries such as Mikan/Kurland and Chamberlain/Russell.

== College career ==
The color line then in effect at Big Ten schools limited DeJernett's college options. From 1931 to 1935 he attended Indiana Central College, now known as the University of Indianapolis, whose coach, Harry Good, actively recruited African American athletes. DeJernett added to his cage celebrity by becoming Indiana's first black college basketball star. The 1933-34 Greyhounds went 16–1 and won their first Indiana Intercollegiate Conference championship. The following year, in his final college season, he captained the team and was role model for freshman Ray Crowe, who considered DeJernett the hero of his youth. Crowe went on to coach Oscar Robertson and the Crispus Attucks team in Indianapolis. Ray Crowe in turn served as mentor to his brother George, Indiana's first Mr. Basketball, and as high school coach of Robertson's brother Bailey, both of whom subsequently attended and starred for Indiana Central.

DeJernett also played football during his freshman year, before the Great Depression forced Indiana Central to drop the sport.

== Professional career ==
DeJernett's first offer to turn pro came in 1933, from the powerful New York Renaissance club, but he chose to stay in school. He made his professional debut in 1935 for one of the first integrated barnstorming basketball teams in US history, the ICC AllStars, which featured DeJernett's former coach Friddle and a number of DeJernett's college and high school teammates. DeJernett returned to school for a ninth semester before opting to sign with the Renaissance in January 1936.

At a time when many of pro basketball's greatest stars were high school dropouts, Big Dave joined fellow Indiana natives Roy Burris (Akron Firestones), Charles "Stretch" Murphy (Firestones), and John Wooden (Indianapolis Kautskys) among the earliest four-year collegiate stars to turn pro with a top-level professional club. Before DeJernett, no African-American collegiate star had stayed in school for the now-traditional four years of college ball in advance of signing with a club of the calibre of the Rens. Examples like DeJernett's of staying in school rather than turning pro early eventually became the accepted practice for Afro-American collegians until the Spencer Haywood and Moses Malone "hardship"/highschool cases emerged in the American Basketball Association of the 1970s.

After a season with the Rens DeJernett played Center from 1936 to 1941 for the Chicago Crusaders, an all-black barnstorming five whose history was closely related to the then-lesser-known Harlem Globetrotters. He suited up for the Chicago Collegians during 1939–40. In the 1940–41 season the Crusaders (billed as the Savoy Big Five) entered into a player-exchange agreement with the Globetrotters. Big Dave also played for the Globetrotters during the 1941–42 season before being drafted into the military. It is stated on DeJernett's Hall of Fame plaque at the University of Indianapolis that he played for the Globetrotters in addition to the Crusaders and Rens, as marks of his professional stature. The Crusaders/Savoys for whom DeJernett played were also known as the Palmer House Indians for a season, during which they played home games at then-brand-new DuSable High School.

== World War II and later life ==
Drafted into World War II in the summer of 1942, DeJernett served as a Sergeant in the North African, Southern France, Rhineland, and Central European theaters, winning a bronze battle star for each of the four campaigns. He returned to the United States in August 1945 and lived in Indianapolis, retired from playing basketball, until dying suddenly of a heart attack on August 4, 1964. His obituary read that "David R DeJernett, 52, was almost forgotten after one of the most brilliant careers in Indiana basketball." He was inducted into the Indiana Basketball Hall of Fame in 1976. Heavyweight boxing champ Joe Louis, who had managed professional basketball teams of his own that played in Chicago against DeJernett's Crusaders and other top teams, said that Big Dave was one of the most outstanding basketball stars he had ever seen in action.
