= Bob Douglas =

American basketball player

Robert (Bob) L. Douglas
- Born: November 4, 1882; Saint Kitts, British West Indies
- Died: July 16, 1979 (aged 96); New York, New York, U.S.
- Occupation: Hall of Fame, Contributor

Robert L. Douglas (b. (St. Kitts) November 4, 1882 – d. (unknown) July 16, 1979) was the founder of the New York Renaissance basketball team, the first fully all-black professional black-owned basketball team.

== Career ==
Nicknamed the "Father of Black Professional Basketball", Douglas owned and coached the Rens from 1923 to 1949, guiding them to a 2,318-381 record (.859).

The Rens barnstormed throughout the United States, mostly in the Midwest, and played any team that would schedule them, black or white. Traveling as far as 200 miles for a game, they often slept on the bus and ate cold meals; they were barred from many hotels and restaurants by Jim Crow laws and norms of racial discrimination which prevailed in the northern United States at the time.

The Rens soon became a dominant team, winning as many as 88 consecutive games during the 1932–33 season. In the twenties and early thirties, their matches with the Original Celtics were basketball's greatest gate attraction. At the World Professional Basketball Tournament they won in 1939, lost to the eventual champion Harlem Globetrotters in 1940, and finished second to the National Basketball League champion Minneapolis Lakers in 1948.

== Accolades ==
He was inducted into the Basketball Hall of Fame as a contributor in 1972, being the first African-American enshrined into the Hall of Fame.
