= Charles Cooper (basketball) =

American basketball player (1907–1980)

Tarzan Cooper
Personal information
- Born: August 30, 1907 Newark, Delaware, U.S.
- Died: December 19, 1980 (aged 73) Philadelphia, Pennsylvania, U.S.
- Listed height: 6 ft 4 in (1.93 m)
- Listed weight: 215 lb (98 kg)

Career information
- High school: Philadelphia Central
- Playing career: 1925–1945
- Position: Center

Career history
- 1925–1928: Philadelphia Panthers
- 1926–1927: Philadelphia Giants
- 1926–1927: Philadelphia Scholastics
- 1929–1941: New York Rens
- 1940–1945: Washington Bears

Career highlights
- 2× WPBL champion (1939, 1943)
- Basketball Hall of Fame

Charles Theodore "Tarzan" Cooper (August 30, 1907 – December 19, 1980) was an American professional basketball player and coach who is enshrined in the Naismith Memorial Basketball Hall of Fame. He is best known for his time with the all-Black professional New York Renaissance.

== Career ==
After playing at Philadelphia Central High School in Pennsylvania, Cooper turned pro in 1925. He played for the Philadelphia Panthers and Philadelphia Saints until 1929 when he joined the New York Renaissance or Rens for eleven seasons. All were independent teams because the early professional leagues were all-white.

In 1939, he won the World Professional Basketball Tournament with the Rens and again in 1943 with the Washington Bears, which he coached and consisted of many former New York Rens players.

At 6 ft 4 in (193 cm), Cooper has been called the greatest center that ever played by Hall of Famer Joe Lapchick, center for the rival Original Celtics.

== Death ==
Cooper died at age 73 in Philadelphia, Pennsylvania, from natural causes.
