= Bill Yancey =

American baseball player (1902-1971)

- Shortstop
- Born: April 2, 1902; Philadelphia, Pennsylvania, U.S.
- Died: April 13, 1971 (aged 68); Marlton, New Jersey, U.S.
- Batted: Right Threw: Right

Negro league baseball debut
- 1927, for the Hilldale Club

Last appearance
- 1936, for the Philadelphia Stars

Teams
- Hilldale Club (1927, 1931); Philadelphia Quaker City Giants (1928); Philadelphia Tigers (1928); New York Lincoln Giants (1929–1930); New York Black Yankees (1932–1934); Brooklyn Eagles (1935); New York Cubans (1936); Philadelphia Stars (1936)

William James Yancey (April 2, 1902 – April 13, 1971) was an American professional baseball shortstop in the Negro leagues. He played from 1927 to 1936. He also played for the New York Renaissance, an all-black professional basketball team. Yancey also served as a Major League scout for the New York Yankees and Philadelphia Phillies.
