= New York Renaissance =

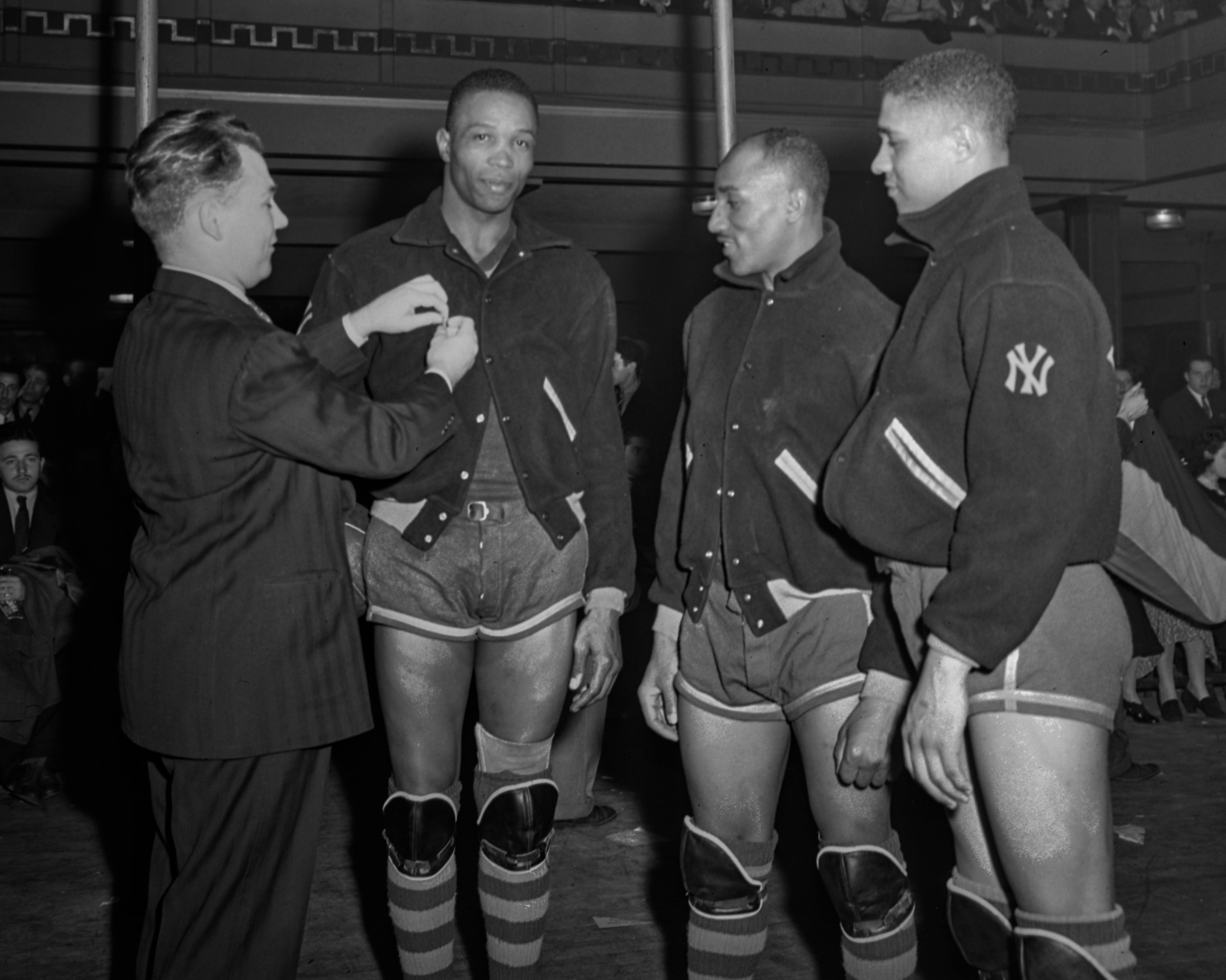
- Members of the Renaissance receive tokens of appreciation from Fred Keller, commander of the New York post of the Veterans of the Abraham Lincoln Brigade, for playing in a charity game for Spanish Civil War refugees and prisoners of Francoist Spain, April 1941
- Nickname: The Big "R" Five
- Leagues: World Professional Basketball Tournament 1939–1948
- Founded: 1923
- Folded: 1951
- Arena: Harlem Renaissance Ballroom
- Team colors: Gold, Navy
- Championships: 1 World Professional Basketball Tournament (1939)

The New York Renaissance, also known as the Renaissance Big R Five and as the Rens, were the first black-owned, all-black, fully-professional basketball team in history, established in October 1923, by Robert "Bob" Douglas. They were named after the Renaissance Casino and Ballroom through an agreement with its owner, in return for the use of that facility as their home court. The Casino and Ballroom at 138th Street and Seventh Avenue in Harlem was an entertainment complex that included a ballroom, which served as the Rens' home court. The team eventually had its own house orchestra and games were often followed by a dance. Their subsequent financial success shifted the focus of black basketball from amateurism to professionalism. Initially, the Rens played mostly in Harlem, but Douglas soon realized they could book more games on the road, in larger-capacity venues, and took up barnstorming across the country for more lucrative payouts. The Renaissance are also the topic of the 2011 documentary On the Shoulders of Giants.

== Early years ==
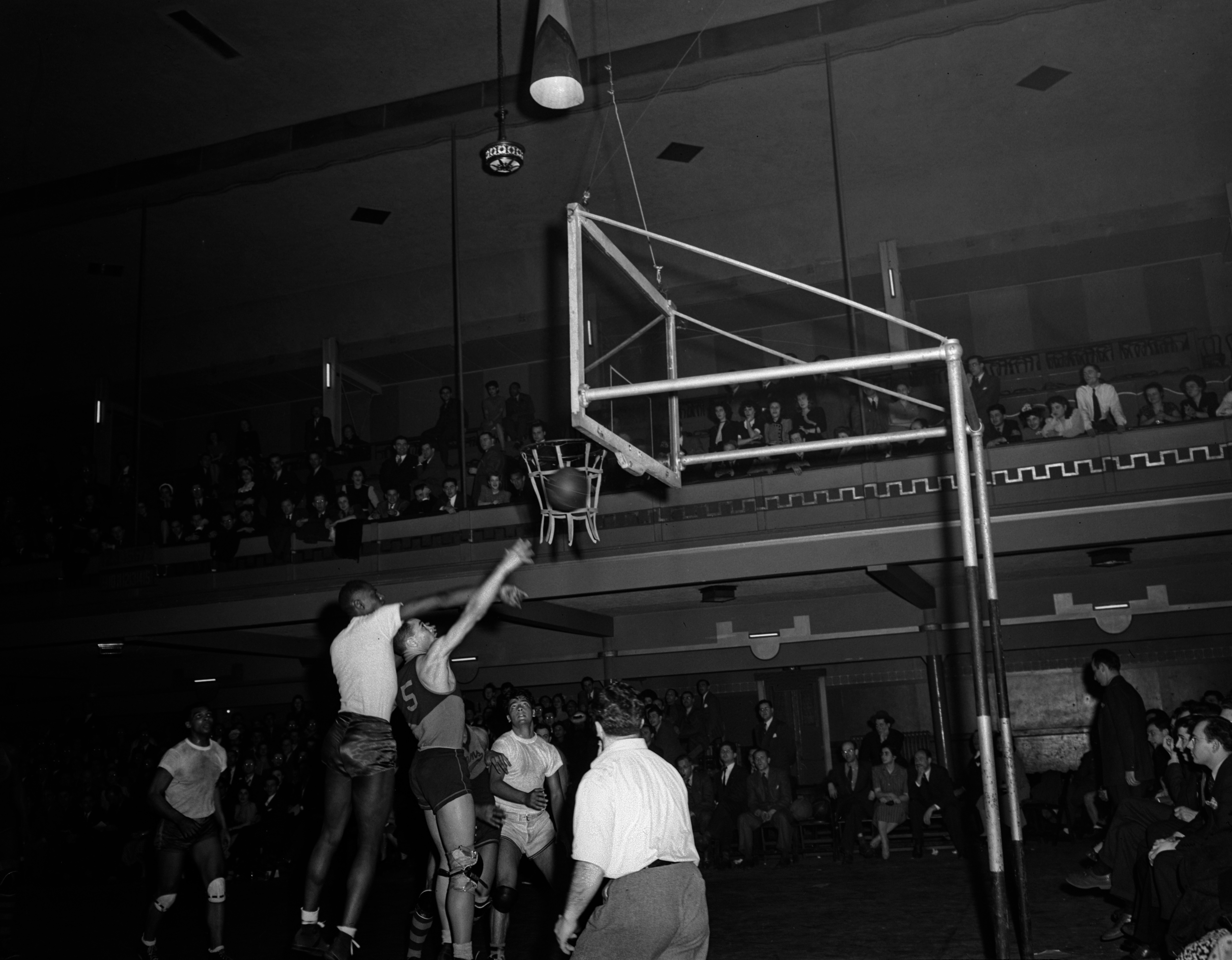
The Rens play an All Star team at the Royal Windsor in New York City, April 1941

The Rens were one of the dominant basketball teams of the 1920s and 1930s. They were originally known as the Spartan Braves, the basketball team of the Spartan Field Club, a Manhattan-based multi-sport amateur athletic organization whose initial focus was cricket. The Rens played their first game on November 3, 1923, winning against the Collegiate Five, an all-white team. Interracial games featured regularly on their schedule, drawing the largest crowds. In its first years, the team strove to beat the Original Celtics, the dominant white team of the time, and claim the title of world champions. In their fifth encounter, the Rens did so for the first time, on December 20, 1925, winning 37 to 30. During the 1932–33 regular season, the Rens compiled a record of 120–8 (six of those losses came at the hands of the Celtics, whom the Rens did beat eight times). During that season, the Rens won 88 consecutive games before eventually losing to the Original Celtics, which was a mark that has never been matched by a professional basketball team. In 1939, the Rens won the first professional basketball championship, when they beat the Oshkosh All-Stars, a white team, 34–25, in the World Professional Basketball Tournament in Chicago.

The team compiled a 2,588–529 record from 1923 to 1948. The team's manager, Eric Illidge, would point out that the reason for their long-term success as a franchise (even as a colored team that was dealing with the typical racial segregation in the United States from that period of time) was that they wouldn't let anyone deny them the right to make a living, even in the areas where such segregation were at their strongest at that point in time. Important players on the Rens roster included Clarence "Fats" Jenkins, Pappy Ricks, Eyre Saitch, Bill Yancey, "Wee" Willie Smith, Charles "Tarzan" Cooper, Zack Clayton, John Isaacs, Dolly King, Pop Gates, and Nat Clifton. In 1936, the Renaissance became the first top-level team to sign a four-year African American college star, David "Big Dave" DeJernett of Indiana Central.

== 1949: Move to Dayton ==
The Rens relocated during the 1948–49 basketball season to Dayton, Ohio, to replace the Detroit Vagabond Kings, who folded in December 1948. The Vagabond Kings had been playing in the racially integrated National Basketball League (NBL). The Rens played the remainder of the NBL season as the Dayton Rens, then disbanded after the NBL merged with the all-white Basketball Association of America to form the, also initially, all-white National Basketball Association which resumed play in the 1949–50 season.

== Memorials and historic recognition ==
- The Naismith Memorial Basketball Hall of Fame inducted the 1932–33 New York Renaissance team collectively in 1963 in recognition of their 88-game winning streak that season, the longest in professional basketball history. Seven former Rens players are individually enshrined: Tarzan Cooper, Pop Gates, Nat Clifton, John Isaacs, Zack Clayton, Fats Jenkins, and Sonny Boswell. Renaissance Big Five founder/owner Bob Douglas is also enshrined as a contributor.
- On May 9, 2017, the Historic Preservation and Transportation Committee of Community Board 10 unanimously (6-0-0) passed a resolution formally requesting that the New York City Council and the Mayor of New York City enact legislation to support the co-naming at the southeast corner of West 138th Street and Adam Clayton Powell Jr. Boulevard to New York Rens Court.

== Stage play ==
Writer and director Layon Gray off-Broadway production Kings Of Harlem pays homage to the Rens. The play centers around the 1939 season in which the Harlem Rens won the first World Basketball Championship. The play won Best Play, Best Supporting Actor, Best Director and Best Production at the 2018 42nd annual Carbonell Awards in Miami. The play will have a regional run at Delaware Theater Company in October 2023 to commemorate the 100 year anniversary of the team.
