= 1948–49 Hammond Calumet Buccaneers season =

NBL professional basketball team season

- Head coach: Bob Carpenter (player-coach; 11–16); George Sobek (player-coach; 10–25)
- Owner: Walter Thornton
- Arena: Hammond Civic Center

Results
- Record: 21–41 (.339)
- Place: Division: 3rd (Eastern)
- Playoff finish: Lost Eastern Division opening round to Syracuse Nationals, 2–0

The 1948–49 Hammond Calumet Buccaneers season was the first and only season played for the Calumet Buccaneers franchise in the National Basketball League, especially since it would ultimately be the last season for that league's general existence. The Hammond Calumet Buccaneers were considered the official replacements of the Toledo Jeeps after they failed to switch leagues from the NBL to the rivaling Basketball Association of America and their financial struggles proved to be too much for Toledo to overcome, with the Calumet Buccaneers operating in a manner similar to that of Wisconsin's professional teams of the time in the Oshkosh All-Stars, Sheboygan Red Skins, and the NFL's Green Bay Packers by being community owned and driven; in this case, the Hammond franchise was owned by a group of 200 backers for shares of $100 each operating in Hammond, Whiting, East Chicago, Indiana, and Calumet City, Illinois (with Calumet City's involvement likely being the reason for the extra Calumet part of their name) under the discretion of NBL president and Anderson Duffey Packers team owner Ike Duffey from the old Toledo Jeeps and Willys-Overland Jeep Plant owner named Virgil Gladieux to a northern Indiana businessman named Walter Thornton. Hammond entered this final season as one of four Eastern Division teams in the league following the departure of the Fort Wayne Zollner Pistons, Indianapolis Kautskys, the latest NBL defending champion Minneapolis Lakers, and the runner-up Rochester Royals, with the NBL officially having nine teams composed of four Eastern Division teams and five Western Division teams throughout this entire season. Their home games were hosted at the Hammond Civic Center, a place that had previously hosted an NBL team beforehand in the Hammond Ciesar All-Americans. This team would also be notable for being the final NBL team to ever host Bobby McDermott as a player; he would later be considered the NBL's all-time greatest player, as he alongside former player-coach Bob Carpenter (who was rented by the Oshkosh All-Stars during this season before he later returned to play for them a bit over the second half of the season) and George Glamack would be named members of the NBL All-Time Team.

Despite finishing their only season of play with a lowly 21–41 record, they would still finish with a better overall record than the all-black Dayton Rens (who entered the league as a last-minute replacement team for the Detroit Vagabond Kings, who essentially folded operations on December 16, 1948, with a 2–17 record and resulted in Dayton inheriting the record Detroit had for a 14–26 record through the Rens' own games leading to a combined record of 16–43 for them) this season in order to qualify for the final NBL Playoffs ever held in 1949. From there, Hammond would get swept by the Syracuse Nationals (now known as the Philadelphia 76ers) 2–0 in the Eastern Division's opening round of the playoffs for what ultimately became the Calumet Buccaneers' final games ever played in franchise history. On August 3, 1949, a merger between the Basketball Association of America and the National Basketball League (which Hammond had played for) was completed to have the two leagues become the modern-day National Basketball Association, which saw the Hammond Calumet Buccaneers joining the all-black Dayton Rens and the Oshkosh All-Stars later on as one of three NBL teams (one of five overall teams alongside the BAA's already non-existent by that time Indianapolis Jets and the soon-to-be-folded Providence Steamrollers) to officially not make it to the merger due to a combination of a lack of funds necessary by the ownership group (to the point where NBL and Anderson Duffey Packers President Ike W. Duffey would have to help them out financially throughout the season alongside both the Oshkosh All-Stars and Sheboygan Red Skins in order to make them all look financially viable and survive at least until the season's conclusion) and concerns of Hammond's long-term survival in the new NBA due to the BAA's side already having the Chicago Stags at the time of the merger. (Ironically, the Stags would end up folding operations themselves the following season after the merger occurred through monetary and ownership issues on their ends, though the NBA would eventually see a new team succeed in Chicago by the 1960s.) Many of Hammond's players would later play for the new NBA, primarily with the Waterloo Hawks through a dispersal draft.

== Draft picks ==
The Hammond Calumet Buccaneers would participate in the 1948 NBL draft, which occurred right after the 1948 BAA draft when plans for a joint draft between the National Basketball League and the rivaling Basketball Association of America ultimately fell out when the defending NBL champion Minneapolis Lakers, Rochester Royals, Fort Wayne Zollner Pistons, and Indianapolis Kautskys turned Jets all defected from the NBL to the BAA. However, as of 2026, no records of what the Calumet Buccaneers' draft picks might have been for the NBL have properly come up (assuming they even would be ready by the time the 1948 NBL draft began), with any information on who those selections might have been (especially since the Hammond franchise would be an expansion franchise for the NBL this season) being lost to time in the process.

== Roster ==
1948–49 Hammond Calumet Buccaneers roster
Players

Pos.	No.	Player	Height	Weight	DOB	From
G/F		Joe Camic	6 ft 4 in (1.93 m)	195 lb (88 kg)	1922–11–28	Duquesne
F		Ken Campbell	6 ft 4 in (1.93 m)	195 lb (88 kg)	1926–06–10	Kentucky
F/C		Bob Carpenter	6 ft 5 in (1.96 m)	200 lb (91 kg)	1917–11–06	East Texas State
F/C		Jake Carter	6 ft 4 in (1.93 m)	195 lb (88 kg)	1924–07–25	East Texas State
G		Ted Cook	6 ft 0 in (1.83 m)	160 lb (73 kg)	1921–04–15	Tennessee
G/F		Aubrey Davis	6 ft 2 in (1.88 m)	175 lb (79 kg)	1921–03–28	East Central State
F/C		Hal Devoll	6 ft 6 in (1.98 m)	210 lb (95 kg)	1925–01–19	Lawrence Tech
F/C		George Glamack	6 ft 6 in (1.98 m)	225 lb (102 kg)	1918–06–07	North Carolina
G		Art Grove	6 ft 0 in (1.83 m)	185 lb (84 kg)	1923–03–17	Toledo
G		Bobby Holm	6 ft 0 in (1.83 m)	200 lb (91 kg)	1919–01–22	Seton Hall
G		Carl Loyd	5 ft 11 in (1.80 m)	170 lb (77 kg)	1925–11–24	Notre Dame
G/F		Jack Maddox	6 ft 3 in (1.91 m)	185 lb (84 kg)	1919–12–10	West Texas State
G		Bobby McDermott	5 ft 11 in (1.80 m)	180 lb (82 kg)	1914–01–07	Flushing HS (NY)
G/F		Stan Patrick	6 ft 2 in (1.88 m)	185 lb (84 kg)	1922–09–09	Illinois
G/F		Len Rader	6 ft 1 in (1.85 m)	185 lb (84 kg)	1921–03–29	Long Island
G/F		Johnny Sebastian	6 ft 0 in (1.83 m)	185 lb (84 kg)	1921–11–20	Southern Illinois
G		Ollie Shoaff	5 ft 10 in (1.78 m)	165 lb (75 kg)	1923–11–10	Southern Illinois
G		Chips Sobek	6 ft 0 in (1.83 m)	180 lb (82 kg)	1920–02–10	Notre Dame
F/C		Clint Wager	6 ft 6 in (1.98 m)	210 lb (95 kg)	1920–01–20	Saint Mary's (MN)

Coaches
Head coach
- Bob Carpenter
- George Sobek

Legend
- (DP) Unsigned draft pick
- (FA) Free agent
- (S) Suspended
- Injured

Roster

Note: Nearly half of the roster shown would not play for the team in the NBL Playoffs against the Syracuse Nationals, as Ken Campbell, original player-coach Bob Carpenter, Ted Cook, Aubrey Davis, Hal Devoll, Art Grove, Bobby Holm, Carl Loyd, and Jack Maddox would all not be on the final playoff roster for one reason or another.

== Regular season ==
=== Season standings ===
Pos.	Eastern Division	Wins	Losses	Win %
1	Anderson Duffey Packers	49	15	.766
2	Syracuse Nationals	40	23	.635
3	Hammond Calumet Buccaneers	21	41	.339
4	Dayton Rens^{‡}	14	26	.350
5	Detroit Vagabond Kings^{‡}	2	17	.105
^{‡} Dayton replaced Detroit, who disbanded during the season, and assumed Detroit's record in the standings. Their combined record was 16–43.

=== NBL Schedule ===
Not to be confused with exhibition or other non-NBL scheduled games that did not count towards Hammond's official NBL record for this season. An official database created by John Grasso detailing every NBL match possible (outside of two matches that the Kankakee Gallagher Trojans won over the Dayton Metropolitans in 1938) would be released in 2026 showcasing every team's official schedules throughout their time spent in the NBL. As such, these are the official results recorded for the Hammond Calumet Buccaneers during their only season in the NBL.

#	Date	Opponent	Score	Record
1	November 3	Denver	58–39	1–0
2	November 7	Detroit	71–65	2–0
3	November 10	Sheboygan	63–57	3–0
4	November 14	Anderson	58–57 (OT)	4–0
5	November 17	@ Waterloo	45–51	4–1
6	November 18	@ Sheboygan	57–51	5–1
7	November 20	@ Tri-Cities	73–93	5–2
8	November 21	Sheboygan	49–50	5–3
9	November 25	Waterloo	57–58	5–4
10	November 27	@ Anderson	60–86	5–5
11	November 28	Syracuse	71–65	6–5
12	December 1	Oshkosh	42–76	6–6
13	December 2	@ Sheboygan	47–63	6–7
14	December 5	Tri-Cities	52–58	6–8
15	December 8	Denver	57–52 (OT)	7–8
16	December 11	@ Oshkosh	45–50	7–9
17	December 12	Tri-Cities	58–70	7–10
18	December 13	@ Detroit	78–59	8–10
19	December 19	Sheboygan	73–75	8–11
20	December 21	@ Sheboygan	55–62	8–12
21	December 22	Dayton	50–53 (OT)	8–13
22	December 23	@ Tri-Cities	64–63	9–13
23	December 26	Waterloo	64–61	10–13
24	December 28	@ Denver	76–78	10–14
25	December 30	@ Denver	60–61	10–15
26	January 2	@ Syracuse	70–59	11–15
27	January 5	Anderson	72–78	11–16
28	January 8	@ Oshkosh	48–51	11–17
29	January 12	Oshkosh	59–61	11–18
30	January 16	Denver	71–73	11–19
31	January 19	Anderson	78–87	11–20
32	January 20	@ Sheboygan	54–64	11–21
33	January 25	@ Tri-Cities	51–75	11–22
34	January 27	N Oshkosh	59–66	11–23
35	January 31	@ Anderson	61–74	11–24
36	February 2	Oshkosh	78–58	12–24
37	February 3	@ Syracuse	49–68	12–25
38	February 6	@ Tri-Cities	49–53	12–26
39	February 9	Syracuse	76–67	13–26
40	February 10	@ Anderson	62–73	13–27
41	February 12	N Dayton	52–43	14–27
42	February 13	@ Syracuse	61–83	14–28
43	February 16	Sheboygan	69–72 (OT)	14–29
44	February 17	@ Sheboygan	73–75	14–30
45	February 20	Oshkosh	53–61	14–31
46	February 23	@ Waterloo	61–63	14–32
47	February 25	@ Waterloo	52–65	14–33
48	February 27	Waterloo	63–73	14–34
49	March 2	@ Waterloo	58–64	14–35
50	March 6	Waterloo	81–72	15–35
51	March 8	Denver	53–68	15–36
52	March 10	@ Denver	53–56	15–37
53	March 13	Syracuse	64–73	15–38
54	March 16	Tri-Cities	60–57	16–38
55	March 17	@ Anderson	68–98	16–39
56	March 18	N Dayton	50–45	17–39
57	March 19	N Dayton	62–53	18–39
58	March 20	@ Syracuse	63–77	18–40
59	March 22	Denver	69–58	19–40
60	March 23	Anderson	61–58	20–40
61	March 27	Anderson	63–62	21–40
62	March 29	Syracuse	69–74 (OT)	21–41

Two more games against either the Detroit Vagabond Kings or the Dayton Rens (or some other team like the Denver Nuggets) were intended to have been played by Hammond as well, but those games were ultimately cancelled either due to the Detroit Vagabond Kings folding operations before being replaced by the Dayton Rens or due to outside circumstances beyond their control, such as weather issues or the lack of care for providing a proper conclusion due to the lack of overall change in playoff positioning either by Hammond's end or for (Detroit/)Dayton's end(s) there.

== NBL Playoffs ==
=== NBL Eastern Division Opening Round ===
(2E) Syracuse Nationals vs. (3E) Hammond Calumet Buccaneers: Syracuse sweeps Hammond 2–0

- Game 1: April 1, 1949 @ Hammond: Syracuse 80, Hammond 69
- Game 2: April 3, 1949 @ Syracuse: Syracuse 72, Hammond 66

== Awards and honors ==
- All-Time NBL Team – Bob Carpenter, George Glamack, and Bobby McDermott

== NBA Dispersal Draft ==
When the NBL and rivaling Basketball Association of America agreed to merge their operations together to form the National Basketball Association on August 3, 1949, it was agreed that the Hammond Calumet Buccaneers would join the all-black Dayton Rens as one of two NBL teams to be denied entry into the newly created league, though the Oshkosh All-Stars would later end up being the third and final NBL team to ultimately deny their entry into the NBA after they expressed doubts upon their success as a franchise when trying to move from Oshkosh, Wisconsin to nearby Milwaukee in order to make their transition to the NBA happen. In the case of Hammond's denial into being granted entry into the NBA, it was partially due to the ownership group failing to converge with enough money on their ends to get their approval into the NBA ready in time and partially because the BAA's side of operations already had the Chicago Stags as a franchise in Illinois, with them seeing Hammond as being way too close to operations to work alongside the more established Chicago-based franchise (which ironically wouldn't have been a long-term problem for Hammond had they been able to play in the NBA since the older Chicago Stags team would end up folding operations a season later due to later financial and ownership issues, though it could have still remained a short-term issue with the NBA all the same). When it came to how the Calumet Buccaneers' players should be best distributed out into the newly established NBA, their players that they had at that point in time (which featured the likes of Don Boven, Joe Camic, Jake Carter, Ted Cook, George Glamack, Dick Hammond, Bobby McDermott, Al Miksis, Stan Patrick, Jack Phelan, Ollie Shoaff, Sterling Scott, Johnny Sebastian, Wayne See, Chips Sobek, and Clint Wager) would all move out of Hammond and look to play for the Waterloo Hawks in the newly established NBA instead later that same day, though not everyone from that list of players would end up playing for Waterloo for one reason or another.
