= List of NBA players (C) =

This is a list of National Basketball Association players whose last names begin with C.

The list also includes players from the American National Basketball League (NBL), the Basketball Association of America (BAA), and the original American Basketball Association (ABA). All of these leagues contributed to the formation of the present-day NBA.

Individuals who played in the NBL prior to its 1949 merger with the BAA are listed in italics, as they are not traditionally listed in the NBA's official player registers.

== C ==
- Žarko Čabarkapa
- Barney Cable
- Soup Cable
- Bruno Caboclo
- Devontae Cacok
- Jason Caffey
- Michael Cage
- Jamal Cain
- Gerry Calabrese
- Nick Calathes
- Jose Calderon
- Adrian Caldwell
- Jim Caldwell
- Joe Caldwell
- Kentavious Caldwell-Pope
- Bill Calhoun
- Corky Calhoun
- Bob Calihan
- Demetrius Calip
- Tom Callahan
- Rick Calloway
- Ernie Calverley
- Mack Calvin
- Toumani Camara
- Dexter Cambridge
- Marcus Camby
- Joe Camic
- Facundo Campazzo
- Elden Campbell
- Fred Campbell
- Ken Campbell
- Tony Campbell
- Ed Campion
- Isaiah Canaan
- Vlatko Čančar
- Devin Cannady
- Larry Cannon
- Clint Capela
- Derrick Caracter
- Frank Card
- Brian Cardinal
- Dylan Cardwell
- Keith Carey
- Vernon Carey Jr.
- Howie Carl
- Chet Carlisle
- Geno Carlisle
- Rick Carlisle
- Don Carlos
- Al Carlson
- Branden Carlson
- Don Carlson
- Dan Carnevale
- Bob Carney
- Rodney Carney
- Tony Carp
- Bob Carpenter
- Antoine Carr
- Austin Carr
- Cameron Carr
- Chris Carr
- Cory Carr
- Kenny Carr
- M. L. Carr
- Darel Carrier
- Bob Carrington
- Bub Carrington
- DeMarre Carroll
- Joe Barry Carroll
- Matt Carroll
- Jimmy Carruth
- Frank Carswell
- Anthony Carter
- Butch Carter
- Devin Carter
- Fred Carter
- George Carter
- Howard Carter
- Hugh Carter
- Jake Carter
- Jevon Carter
- Maurice Carter
- Reggie Carter
- Ron Carter
- Vince Carter
- Wendell Carter Jr.
- Michael Carter-Williams
- D. J. Carton
- Bill Cartwright
- Jay Carty
- Alex Caruso
- Cornelius Cash
- Sam Cash
- Sam Cassell
- Omri Casspi
- Stephon Castle
- Colin Castleton
- Harvey Catchings
- Terry Catledge
- Sid Catlett
- Kelvin Cato
- Bobby Cattage
- Willie Cauley-Stein
- Troy Caupain
- Duane Causwell
- Tyler Cavanaugh
- Ron Cavenall
- Ahmad Caver
- Malcolm Cazalon
- Cedric Ceballos
- John Celestand
- Chris Cenac Jr.
- Al Cervi
- Lionel Chalmers
- Mario Chalmers
- Bill Chamberlain
- Wilt Chamberlain
- Jerry Chambers
- Tom Chambers
- Julian Champagnie
- Justin Champagnie
- Mike Champion
- Kennedy Chandler
- Tyson Chandler
- Wilson Chandler
- Don Chaney
- John Chaney
- Rex Chapman
- Wayne Chapman
- Len Chappell
- Ken Charles
- Lorenzo Charles
- Joe Chealey
- Calbert Cheaney
- Zylan Cheatham
- Maurice Cheeks
- Phil Chenier
- Will Cherry
- George Chestnut
- Derrick Chievous
- Pete Chilcutt
- Josh Childress
- Randolph Childress
- Chris Childs
- Chris Chiozza
- Leroy Chollet
- Ulrich Chomche
- Jim Chones
- Marquese Chriss
- Fred Christ
- Cal Christensen
- Bob Christian
- Cam Christie
- Doug Christie
- Max Christie
- Dionte Christmas
- Rakeem Christmas
- Semaj Christon
- Josh Christopher
- Patrick Christopher
- Steve Chubin
- Chuck Chuckovits
- Ralph Churchfield
- Robert Churchwell
- Hal Cihlar
- Moussa Cissé
- Sidy Cissoko
- Archie Clark
- Carlos Clark
- Dick Clark
- Earl Clark
- Gary Clark
- Ian Clark
- Jaylen Clark
- Keon Clark
- Brandon Clarke
- Coty Clarke
- Jordan Clarkson
- Gian Clavell
- Víctor Claver
- John Clawson
- Charles Claxton
- Nic Claxton
- Speedy Claxton
- Walter Clayton Jr.
- Jim Cleamons
- Don Cleary
- Mateen Cleaves
- Barry Clemens
- Chris Clemons
- Antonius Cleveland
- Nique Clifford
- Nat Clifton
- Donovan Clingan
- Bill Closs
- Keith Closs
- Noah Clowney
- Paul Cloyd
- Bob Cluggish
- Ben Clyde
- Doyle Cofer
- Amir Coffey
- Richard Coffey
- Fred Cofield
- John Coker
- Bobby Colburn
- Norris Cole
- Ben Coleman
- Derrick Coleman
- E. C. Coleman
- Jack Coleman
- Norris Coleman
- Paul Coleman
- Marv Colen
- Bimbo Coles
- Isaiah Collier
- Jason Collier
- Art Collins
- Don Collins
- Doug Collins
- James Collins
- Jarron Collins
- Jason Collins
- Jimmy Collins
- John Collins
- Mardy Collins
- Sherron Collins
- Yuri Collins
- Zach Collins
- Kyle Collinsworth
- Darren Collison
- Nick Collison
- Joe Colone
- Bonzie Colson
- Sean Colson
- Steve Colter
- Chance Comanche
- Glen Combs
- Leroy Combs
- John Comeaux
- Dallas Comegys
- Jim Cominsky
- Larry Comley
- Jeff Congdon
- Gene Conley
- Larry Conley
- Mike Conley
- Ed Conlin
- Marty Conlon
- Pat Connaughton
- Jimmy Dan Conner
- Lester Conner
- Chuck Connors
- Will Conroy
- Ryan Conwell
- Anthony Cook
- Bert Cook
- Bobby Cook
- Brian Cook
- Daequan Cook
- Darwin Cook
- Jeff Cook
- Norm Cook
- Omar Cook
- Quinn Cook
- Ted Cook
- Tyler Cook
- Charles Cooke
- David Cooke
- Javonte Cooke
- Joe Cooke
- Xavier Cooks
- Jack Cooley
- Carson Cooper
- Chuck Cooper
- Duane Cooper
- Joe Cooper
- Michael Cooper
- Sharife Cooper
- Wayne Cooper
- Tom Copa
- Robert Cope
- Chris Copeland
- Hollis Copeland
- Lanard Copeland
- Tyrone Corbin
- Chris Corchiani
- Ken Corley
- Ray Corley
- Petr Cornelie
- Dave Corzine
- Ed Costain
- Larry Costello
- Matt Costello
- Bob Cotton
- Bryce Cotton
- Jack Cotton
- James Cotton
- John Coughran
- Bilal Coulibaly
- Ricky Council IV
- Mel Counts
- Steve Courtin
- Joe Courtney
- Marcus Cousin
- DeMarcus Cousins
- Bob Cousy
- Bill Coven
- Robert Covington
- Cedric Coward
- Dave Cowens
- Chubby Cox
- Johnny Cox
- Wesley Cox
- Allen Crabbe
- Torrey Craig
- Gene Cramer
- Chris Crawford
- Freddie Crawford
- Isaiah Crawford
- Jamal Crawford
- Joe Crawford
- Jordan Crawford
- Mitch Creek
- Jim Creighton
- Ron Crevier
- Harold Crisler
- Joe Crispin
- Charlie Criss
- Russ Critchfield
- Winston Crite
- Javaris Crittenton
- Dillard Crocker
- Bobby Croft
- Geoff Crompton
- Terry Crosby
- Austin Croshere
- Jeff Cross
- Pete Cross
- Russell Cross
- Chink Crossin
- John Crotty
- Bill Crow
- Mark Crow
- Corey Crowder
- Jae Crowder
- George Crowe
- Leo Crowe
- Kieran Crowley
- Freddie Crum
- Jalen Crutcher
- LJ Cryer
- Al Cueto
- Cui Yongxi
- Marty Cullen
- Jarrett Culver
- Duke Cumberland
- Jarron Cumberland
- Pat Cummings
- Terry Cummings
- Vonteego Cummings
- Billy Cunningham
- Cade Cunningham
- Cookie Cunningham
- Dante Cunningham
- Dick Cunningham
- Jared Cunningham
- William Cunningham
- Radisav Ćurčić
- Armand Cure
- Earl Cureton
- Bill Curley
- Fran Curran
- Jim Currie
- Dell Curry
- Eddy Curry
- JamesOn Curry
- Michael Curry
- Seth Curry
- Stephen Curry
- Rastko Cvetković
- Walt Czarnecki
