= 1948–49 Detroit Vagabond Kings / Dayton Rens season =

NBL professional basketball teams seasons

- Head coach: Del Loranger (Detroit's player-coach); Pop Gates (Dayton's player-coach)
- General manager: Ernie Pabis? (Detroit Vagabond Kings); Eric Illidge (Dayton Rens)
- Owner(s): C. King Boring; Ernie Pabis (Detroit Vagabond Kings); Bob Douglas (Dayton Rens)
- Arena: Holy Redeemer High School Gymnasium; Dearborn High School Gymnasium (Detroit Vagabond Kings); Springfield High School (Dayton Rens)

Results
- Record: 16–43 (.271)
- Place: Division: 4th (Eastern)
- Playoff finish: Did not qualify (Detroit folded operations; Dayton finished season)

The 1948–49 Detroit Vagabond Kings / Dayton Rens season was the first and only professional season played for both the Detroit Vagabond Kings (the original franchise that started out this season) and the Dayton Rens (a rebranded version of the all-black New York Renaissance barnstorming team that once won the inaugural World Professional Basketball Tournament) franchises in the National Basketball League, especially since it would ultimately be the last season for that league's general existence. While this was officially the first (and only) professional season of play for the Detroit Vagabond Kings franchise (who were owned by Ernie Pabis and former Detroit Gems owner C. King Boring) before they later ended up becoming a barnstorming franchise themselves up until 1956, the Dayton Rens originally played as the New York Renaissance starting back in 1923 (and sometimes had players still playing under that independent moniker during this season, even in road games, due to that franchise still being able to make money under that name by this point in time), which would make this its 25th (and potentially final) season of play for them as a franchise. Due to the NBL losing four of their major franchises to the rivaling Basketball Association of America, they would start out this season with only four teams in the Eastern Division (including just the Detroit Vagabond Kings and not the Dayton Rens at first) and five teams in the Western Division.

The Detroit Vagabond Kings would start out the final season of the NBL when it began (in a match against the Oshkosh All-Stars) on October 30, 1948, but due to a combination of them playing in mixed home venues in the Detroit area, the poor attendance they had in the venues they did play in (hardly exceeding 1,000 paid attendees in a few of the games they had in the one venue that did exceed that amount), and the poor record they had before folding operations with a 2–17 record (with their only wins being against the original Denver Nuggets team on November 9 and December 7, 1948, with 56–48 and 86–76 victories on those respective dates), the Vagabond Kings folded operations as a professional franchise on December 16. This led to NBL commissioner Doxie Moore and NBL president Ike Duffey convincing New York Renaissance team owner Bob Douglas to take over the Vagabond Kings' position in the NBL and rebranding the franchise to the Dayton Rens (playing their home games in Dayton, Ohio instead of in Harlem out in Manhattan, New York despite Dayton being a notably segregated area in the state of Ohio at the time due to the small following the Rens acquired in the city of Dayton) the following day afterward for the rest of the 1948–49 NBL season. Due to the Rens being an all-black franchise for their entire history, the Dayton Rens would end up becoming the first ever racially integrated franchise to ever join a professional league that was previously considered all or mostly white oriented up until the day the Rens officially joined the NBL. While the Rens ended up performing a lot better in the remaining games they played throughout the rest of the season (going 14–26 in the remaining 40 games they played in the NBL, which gave Dayton a total combined record of 16–43 when including the previous games the Detroit Vagabond Kings had in the NBL), they still ended up missing out on joining the final NBL Playoffs ever played altogether due, in part, to the awkward way the Eastern Division was set up on their ends (while the Eastern Division technically did have five teams competing there alongside the Western Division, the Eastern Division was forced to utilize the Rens replacing the Detroit Vagabond Kings with their combined records as the official fourth and final team there for the rest of the season) alongside the Rens being forced to combine their 40 games played with the previous games the Detroit Vagabond Kings had earlier in the season.

Following the final NBL season's conclusion, when the NBL merged with the rivaling Basketball Association of America on August 3, 1949, to become the modern-day National Basketball Association, the Dayton Rens ended up joining the Hammond Calumet Buccaneers and the Oshkosh All-Stars as one of three NBL teams to not only be excluded from the official BAA-NBL merger into the NBL, but also fold operations entirely not long afterward. However, with the case of the Rens, their exclusion was primarily related to racial segregation in mind for the newly established NBA due to the primary operatives of that new league coming from the BAA's side of things more than the NBL's side of things (though it had been suggested that, had the New York Renaissance won the final World Professional Basketball Tournament ever held over the Minneapolis Lakers (who had since moved onto the BAA (now NBA)), the Rens would have had greater leverage to hold as WPBT champions in order to get their potential move into the NBA to officially become a reality), though the NBA would later allow for black players to join the NBA by as early as the 1950–51 NBA season following the removal of six NBA teams (four of which came from the NBL's side of operations in the final NBL champion Anderson (Duffey) Packers, the original Denver Nuggets, the Sheboygan Red Skins, and the Waterloo Hawks all defecting from the NBA to create a short-lived rivaling league of their own called the National Professional Basketball League). The rejection from the newly established league following the merger (to the point where the NBA wouldn't even hold a dispersal draft in relation to the Dayton Rens players who were on the team that season) would soon lead to the Rens' team owner, Bob Douglas, folding the Rens franchise entirely not too long after the BAA-NBL merger into the NBA became official.

== Draft picks ==
Only the Detroit Vagabond Kings and not the Dayton Rens would participate in the 1948 NBL draft, which occurred right after the 1948 BAA draft when plans for a joint draft between the National Basketball League and the rivaling Basketball Association of America ultimately fell out when the defending NBL champion Minneapolis Lakers, Rochester Royals, Fort Wayne Zollner Pistons, and Indianapolis Kautskys turned Jets all defected from the NBL to the BAA. However, as of 2026, no records of what the Vagabond Kings' draft picks might have been for the NBL have properly come up (assuming they even would be ready by the time the 1948 NBL draft began), with any information on who those selections might have been (especially since the Detroit franchise would be considered an expansion franchise for the NBL this season) being lost to time in the process.

== Detroit Vagabond Kings Roster ==
1948–49 Detroit Vagabond Kings roster
Players

Pos.	No.	Player	Height	Weight	DOB	From
F/C		Art Bakeraitis	6 ft 4 in (1.93 m)	210 lb (95 kg)	1925–02–19	Bay City Junior College
G		Fred Campbell	5 ft 11 in (1.80 m)	175 lb (79 kg)	1920–08–08	Southern Illinois
F		Doyle Cofer	6 ft 4 in (1.93 m)	185 lb (84 kg)	1923–01–18	Indiana State
F		Dillard Crocker	6 ft 4 in (1.93 m)	205 lb (93 kg)	1923–01–18	Western Michigan
F/C		Hal Devoll	6 ft 6 in (1.98 m)	210 lb (95 kg)	1925–01–19	Lawrence Tech
G/F		Paul Juntunen	6 ft 1 in (1.85 m)	180 lb (82 kg)	1921–02–13	Wayne State
C		Tony Kaseta	6 ft 8 in (2.03 m)	220 lb (100 kg)	1923–09–29	Northern HS (MI)
F/C		Dave Latter	6 ft 6 in (1.98 m)	210 lb (95 kg)	1922–01–05	Leslie HS (MI)
G/F		Del Loranger	6 ft 3 in (1.91 m)	175 lb (79 kg)	1920–03–17	Western Michigan
G/F		Ben Schadler	6 ft 0 in (1.83 m)	185 lb (84 kg)	1924–03–09	Northwestern
G/F		Johnny Sebastian	6 ft 0 in (1.83 m)	185 lb (84 kg)	1921–11–20	Southern Illinois
G		Ollie Shoaff	5 ft 10 in (1.78 m)	165 lb (75 kg)	1923–11–10	Southern Illinois
G		Dick Shrider	6 ft 2 in (1.88 m)	190 lb (86 kg)	1923–02–07	Ohio

Coaches
Head coach
- Del Loranger

Legend
- (DP) Unsigned draft pick
- (FA) Free agent
- (S) Suspended
- Injured

Roster

=== Detroit Vagabond Kings Schedule ===
Not to be confused with exhibition or other non-NBL scheduled games that did not count towards Detroit's official NBL record for this season. An official database created by John Grasso detailing every NBL match possible (outside of two matches that the Kankakee Gallagher Trojans won over the Dayton Metropolitans in 1938) would be released in 2026 showcasing every team's official schedules throughout their time spent in the NBL. As such, these are the official results recorded for the Detroit Vagabond Kings during their only season in the NBL.

#	Date	Opponent	Score	Record
1	October 30	@ Oshkosh	59–72	0–1
2	November 1	@ Anderson	59–89	0–2
3	November 3	N Oshkosh	37–75	0–3
4	November 4	N Oshkosh	59–63	0–4
5	November 6	@ Oshkosh	54–81	0–5
6	November 7	@ Hammond	65–71	0–6
7	November 9	N Denver	56–54	1–6
8	November 14	@ Waterloo	53–72	1–7
9	November 16	Sheboygan	57–64	1–8
10	November 23	N Syracuse	54–78	1–9
11	November 27	@ Tri-Cities	73–92	1–10
12	November 30	Waterloo	63–65	1–11
13	December 1	N Anderson	62–76	1–12
14	December 2	@ Anderson	60–86	1–13
15	December 4	Denver	56–64	1–14
16	December 7	Denver	86–76	2–14
17	December 11	Sheboygan	65–80	2–15
18	December 13	Hammond	59–78	2–16
19	December 16	N Anderson	84–92	2–17

=== Detroit's NBL Dispersal Draft ===
When the Detroit Vagabond Kings announced that they would fold operations altogether for the rest of the 1948–49 NBL season on December 16, 1948, the NBL hosted an impromptu dispersal draft of sorts later that same day (as well as one day before the Dayton Rens were placed in the NBL as the replacement squad for Detroit) involving the remaining NBL teams acquiring any of the Vagabond Kings' players that they felt interested in acquiring along the way, similar to the way the Chicago American Gears' players were redistributed amongst the other NBL teams in the previous season there following the quick collapse of the American Gears' failed rivaling Professional Basketball League of America. When this dispersal draft of sorts became completed, it saw former Syracuse Nationals turned Detroit player Johnny Sebastian, Ollie Shoaff, and Hal Devoll all going to the Hammond Calumet Buccaneers (who became a short-lived NBL franchise themselves by the end of this season), former Fort Wayne Pistons player from the now-rivaling Basketball Association of America (now Detroit Pistons of the National Basketball Association) Dillard Crocker going to the Anderson Duffey Packers (who would end up winning the final NBL championship that season), and former Chicago Stags (of the BAA) player Ben Schadler going to the Waterloo Hawks, with former Detroit Gems players Dave Latter and player-coach Del Loranger opting to retire from NBL play altogether and stay in the city of Detroit instead. Beyond those players, however, there was very little interest in any of the other players on the Vagabond Kings' roster by comparison to the interest that was had for the former NBL champion Chicago American Gears' players, though one player from the Vagabond Kings named Dick Shrider did previously play for the New York Knicks in the rivaling Basketball Association of America in this season before joining the Detroit squad. Incidentally, one other Vagabond Kings player (and former Detroit Gems player-coach), Fred Campbell, would end up returning to the Vagabond Kings franchise once they became a barnstorming franchise, with Campbell also being a player-coach as well for a few years there.

== Dayton Rens Roster ==
Please note that due to the way records for professional basketball leagues like the NBL and the ABL were recorded at the time, some information on both teams and players may be harder to list out than usual here.

1948–49 Dayton Rens roster
Players

Pos.	No.	Player	Height	Weight	DOB	From
G/F		Rookie Brown	6 ft 4 in (1.93 m)	210 lb (95 kg)	1925–02–15	Howard
C		George Crowe	6 ft 10 in (2.08 m)	225 lb (102 kg)	1921–03–22	Indiana Central
G/F		Duke Cumberland	6 ft 2 in (1.88 m)	180 lb (82 kg)	1915–10–20	Scott HS (OH)
G/F		Hank DeZonie	6 ft 2 in (1.88 m)	180 lb (82 kg)	1922–02–12	Clark Atlanta
F/C		Bill Farrow	6 ft 6 in (1.98 m)	195 lb (88 kg)	1918–06–15	DePaul
F/C		Len Ford	6 ft 5 in (1.96 m)	198 lb (90 kg)	1926–02–18	Creighton
G/F		Pop Gates	6 ft 0 in (1.83 m)	180 lb (82 kg)	1917–08–30	Benjamin Franklin HS (NY)
G		John Isaacs	5 ft 11 in (1.80 m)	160 lb (73 kg)	1915–09–15	Textile HS (NY)
PF		Dolly King	6 ft 5 in (1.96 m)	195 lb (88 kg)	1913–10–19	Long Island
G		Vic Krafft	6 ft 0 in (1.83 m)	168 lb (76 kg)	1919–06–03	Woodrow Wilson Junior College
C		Longie Powell	6 ft 7 in (2.01 m)	210 lb (95 kg)	1919–02–14	Friedrich Froebel HS (IN)
G		Red Pryor	5 ft 11 in (1.80 m)	160 lb (73 kg)	1926–06–02	DePaul
F		Tom Sealy	6 ft 3 in (1.91 m)	195 lb (88 kg)	1921–01–31	Brooklyn College
G/F		Wee Willie Smith	6 ft 2 in (1.88 m)	185 lb (84 kg)	1911–04–22	East Tech HS (OH)
SG		Jim Usry	6 ft 4 in (1.93 m)	174 lb (79 kg)	1922–02–22	Lincoln University (PA)
F		Eddie Wollen	6 ft 4 in (1.93 m)		1909–05	Unknown
G/F		Sonny Wood	6 ft 0 in (1.83 m)	185 lb (84 kg)	1922–12–31	Benjamin Franklin HS (NY)

Coaches
Head coach
- Pop Gates

Legend
- (DP) Unsigned draft pick
- (FA) Free agent
- (S) Suspended
- Injured

Roster

=== Dayton Rens Schedule ===
Not to be confused with exhibition or other non-NBL scheduled games that did not count towards Dayton's official NBL record for this season (excluding the previous games the Detroit Vagabond Kings played in the NBL earlier this season), meaning games from the New York Renaissance's end would not count in this case. An official database created by John Grasso detailing every NBL match possible (outside of two matches that the Kankakee Gallagher Trojans won over the Dayton Metropolitans in 1938) would be released in 2026 showcasing every team's official schedules throughout their time spent in the NBL. As such, these are the official results recorded for the Dayton Rens during their only season in the NBL, with their record section showcasing both their own record as a franchise and the combined record of theirs with the previous Detroit Vagabond Kings' NBL record in parentheses at the bottom due to their unique situation at hand.

#	Date	Opponent	Score	Record
1 (20)	December 19	Anderson	61–83	0–1 (2–18)
2 (21)	December 22	@ Hammond	53–50 (OT)	1–1 (3–18)
3 (22)	December 26	@ Tri-Cities	49–70	1–2 (3–19)
4 (23)	December 27	N Oshkosh	69–89	1–3 (3–20)
5 (24)	January 11	@ Denver	56–47	2–3 (4–20)
6 (25)	January 13	@ Denver	47–60	2–4 (4–21)
7 (26)	January 16	@ Waterloo	45–59	2–5 (4–22)
8 (27)	January 19	N Oshkosh	67–55	3–5 (5–22)
9 (28)	January 20	@ Oshkosh	64–62	4–5 (6–22)
10 (29)	January 23	N Oshkosh	49–57	4–6 (6–23)
11 (30)	January 25	N Denver	70–64	5–6 (7–23)
12 (31)	January 29	N Syracuse	65–85	5–7 (7–24)
13 (32)	January 30	@ Syracuse	68–78	5–8 (7–25)
14 (33)	January 31	N Syracuse	55–65	5–9 (7–26)
15 (34)	February 7	N Tri-Cities	51–49	6–9 (8–26)
16 (35)	February 9	N Waterloo	44–56	6–10 (8–27)
17 (36)	February 10	@ Tri-Cities	61–54	7–10 (9–27)
18 (37)	February 12	N Hammond	43–52	7–11 (9–28)
19 (38)	February 13	Anderson	51–54	7–12 (9–29)
20 (39)	February 15	N Waterloo	53–52	8–12 (10–29)
21 (40)	February 16	N Anderson	68–76	8–13 (10–30)
22 (41)	February 20	@ Sheboygan	61–59	9–13 (11–30)
23 (42)	February 21	N Tri-Cities	54–74	9–14 (11–31)
24 (43)	February 24	@ Syracuse	49–66	9–15 (11–32)
25 (44)	March 3	@ Tri-Cities	60–58	10–15 (12–32)
26 (45)	March 6	@ Syracuse	57–61	10–16 (12–33)
27 (46)	March 9	@ Tri-Cities	56–65	10–17 (12–34)
28 (47)	March 10	N Tri-Cities	45–68	10–18 (12–35)
29 (48)	March 13 (Game 1)	@ Sheboygan	52–67	10–19 (12–36)
30 (49)	March 13 (Game 2)	@ Sheboygan	50–52	10–20 (12–37)
31 (50)	March 15	N Syracuse	69–51	11–20 (13–37)
32 (51)	March 18	N Hammond	45–50	11–21 (13–38)
33 (52)	March 19	N Hammond	53–62	11–22 (13–39)
34 (53)	March 20	@ Waterloo	50–52	11–23 (13–40)
35 (54)	March 21	@ Anderson	69–74	11–24 (13–41)
36 (55)	March 23	N Sheboygan	55–60	11–25 (13–42)
37 (56)	March 26	N Waterloo	61–45	12–25 (14–42)
38 (57)	March 29	N Denver	69–55	13–25 (15–42)
39 (58)	March 31 (Game 1)	@ Sheboygan	62–68	13–26 (15–43)
40 (59)	March 31 (Game 2)	@ Sheboygan	61–54	14–26 (16–43)

The Detroit Vagabond Kings / Dayton Rens franchise(s) would miss a grand total of five game played throughout this season, with one game being cancelled being against the Syracuse Nationals and some combination of games each being cancelled against each of the original Denver Nuggets franchise, the Hammond Calumet Buccaneers, and the Waterloo Hawks. Those cancelled games would likely be related to the Detroit Vagabond Kings folding operations early on in their season and subsequently being replaced by the Dayton Rens not long afterward, though some games might have been due to other concerns relating to scheduling (such as serious weather problems or even travel problems in the case of the Denver Nuggets) where none of the teams' records would ultimately be affected in a significant manner throughout this season.

== Season standings ==
Pos.	Eastern Division	Wins	Losses	Win %
1	Anderson Duffey Packers	49	15	.766
2	Syracuse Nationals	40	23	.635
3	Hammond Calumet Buccaneers	21	41	.339
4	Dayton Rens^{‡}	14	26	.350
5	Detroit Vagabond Kings^{‡}	2	17	.105
^{‡} Dayton replaced Detroit, who disbanded during the season, and assumed Detroit's record in the standings. Their combined record was 16–43.

== Awards and honors ==
- Pop Gates – All-Time NBL Team
