= Matt Mieske =

American baseball player (born 1968)

- Right Fielder
- Born: February 13, 1968 (age 58); Midland, Michigan, U.S.
- Batted: Right Threw: Right

MLB debut
- May 3, 1993, for the Milwaukee Brewers

Last MLB appearance
- September 30, 2000, for the Arizona Diamondbacks

MLB statistics
- Batting average: .262
- Home runs: 56
- Runs batted in: 226
- Stats at Baseball Reference

Teams
- Milwaukee Brewers (1993–1997); Chicago Cubs (1998); Seattle Mariners (1999); Houston Astros (1999–2000); Arizona Diamondbacks (2000)

Matthew Todd Mieske (born February 13, 1968) is an American former professional baseball right fielder. He played in Major League Baseball (MLB) from 1993 to 2000 for the Milwaukee Brewers, Chicago Cubs, Seattle Mariners, Houston Astros and Arizona Diamondbacks.

Mieske attended Bay City Western High School in Auburn, Michigan, then Western Michigan University. He set Broncos baseball program records for career home runs, runs batted in (RBI), doubles, total bases, and stolen bases and still holds the program records for runs. He also played for the United States collegiate national team in 1989.

The San Diego Padres selected Mieske in the 17th round of the 1990 MLB draft. In the minors, he was the Northwest League most valuable player (MVP) in 1990 then the California League MVP in 1991. He was one of three players traded to Milwaukee for Gary Sheffield in March 1992. Mieske made his MLB debut and played five seasons for the Brewers. He started a majority of the team's games in right field in 1996, setting career highs with 14 home runs, 64 RBI, and 76 strikeouts. He dealt with a hamstring injury in 1997.

Mieske signed free agent contracts with the Cubs for the 1998 season and Mariners for the 1999 season. Seattle traded him to Houston for pitcher Kevin Hodges in June 1999. He made his only postseason appearance that year, batting 0-for-4 with one walk and one run. The Astros released Mieske in August 2000, and he signed later that month with Arizona, playing in 11 games to end his MLB career.

In 663 MLB games over eight seasons, Mieske posted a .262 batting average with 225 runs, 78 doubles, 10 triples, 56 home runs, 226 RBI, 124 walks, .318 on-base percentage and .434 slugging percentage. He finished his career with a .979 fielding percentage across all three outfield positions.

== Personal life ==
Mieske is married and has a child. After his playing career, Mieske became a certified financial planner.

Mieske was inducted into the Bay County Sports Hall of Fame in 2002. He also played football and basketball in high school.
