= Art Bakeraitis =

American basketball player

Personal information
- Born: February 19, 1925 Bay City, Michigan, U.S.
- Died: July 4, 2014 (aged 89) Auburn, Michigan, U.S.
- Listed height: 6 ft 4 in (1.93 m)
- Listed weight: 210 lb (95 kg)

Career information
- High school: Bay City Central (Bay City, Michigan)
- College: Bay City JC
- Position: Forward / center

Career history
- 1948: Detroit Vagabond Kings

Arthur H. Bakeraitis (February 19, 1925 – July 4, 2014) was an American professional basketball player. He played in the National Basketball League for the Detroit Vagabond Kings during the 1948–49 season and averaged 4.6 points per game.

== Military service ==
Bakeraitis served in the United States Army in the WWII, with deployments to the Southern Philippines and Northern Solomons.
