= WCHW-FM =

- Bay City, Michigan; United States
- Broadcast area: Bay City, Michigan
- Frequency: 91.3 MHz
- Branding: The Rock of the Tri's

Programming
- Format: Rock; High school station / Classical
- Affiliations: WCPE

Ownership
- Owner: Bay City Public Schools

History
- First air date: October 24, 1973
- Call sign meaning: Central and Western (Bay City's public high schools in 1973)

Technical information
- Licensing authority: FCC
- Class: A
- ERP: 110 watts
- HAAT: 38 meters (125 ft)

Links
- Public license information: Public file; LMS

WCHW-FM (91.3 FM) is a high school radio station. Licensed to Bay City, Michigan, it first began broadcasting in 1973. The station broadcasts in mono. It broadcasts from a 124-foot antenna located at Central High School on Columbus Avenue in the east side of Bay City.

Programming on WCHW, generally an Album Oriented Rock format, is shared by students at Bay City Central High School and Bay City Western High School during the day on days when school is in session especially between the times of 9-10am. During nighttime hours, weekends and student holidays, programming from North Carolina's WCPE-FM can be heard instead.
