= Bay City Western High School =

Location
- 500 Midland Road; Auburn, Michigan 48611; United States; 43.6045°N 84.0784°W

Information
- Type: Secondary
- Established: 1973
- School district: Bay City Public Schools
- Superintendent: Grant Hegenauer
- CEEB code: 230128
- NCES School ID: 260426004113
- Dean: Elizabeth Christensen
- Principal: Judy Cox
- Teaching staff: 45.21 (FTE)
- Grades: 9-12
- Enrollment: 1,033 (2023-2024)
- Student to teacher ratio: 22.85
- Campus: Suburban
- Colors: Brown and Gold
- Nickname: Warrior
- Rival: Bay City Central
- Accreditation: North Central Association
- Website: BCW website

Bay City Western High School (colloquially referred to as BCW or WHS) is a high school located at 500 Midland Road, Auburn, Michigan, and a part of Bay City Public Schools. Its mascot is the Warrior, and its colors are brown and gold. The school fight song consists of music from the march Winchester (from Winchester High School, Winchester, Virginia), with original words written for Western High. The entrance roads to the school are Bryant Boulevard, named after the original principal, and Noell Way, named in honor of the school district administrator and head of the school board at the time.

== History ==
Western High School opened in September 1973 after two years of construction. It was built due to the overcrowding at Bay City Central and T. L. Handy High School. During this time the students who lived in Bay City would go to school in the morning from 7:00 AM to 12:00 Noon; and those outside of the city would go in the afternoon, from 12:00 Noon through 5:00 PM. Seniors (and some juniors) were given the option to complete their education at Handy or Central. When the building opened, construction on some parts of the facility had not yet been completed, including the main hallway, the swimming pool, the football stadium, and the commons.

In the 1980s, it was announced that Western Middle School would be created and would share a building with Western High School. The two schools are able to operate simultaneously because of different schedules. In addition, classrooms are physically separated into different areas of the building. The two schools share the building's swimming pool and commons, but each has its own gymnasium.

In the 1980s, some portions of the school's tunnel systems collapsed due to water damage and were fixed with wooden beams to prevent future damage.

Bay City Western earned athletic state championships in 1999 in Michigan Division I Boys' Golf, and in 2013 and 2014 in Division 1 Baseball. In 2006 the Pompon team earned a state championship at the Highkick competition.

== Grounds ==
The grounds consist of tennis courts, practice fields, baseball fields, and track surrounding the football field.

== Western High School Band ==
The WHS Marching band is known as the Western High School Marching Warriors. The school offers a concert, symphonic, jazz, and marching band.

== Demographics ==
The demographic breakdown of the 1,102 students enrolled in 2022-2023 was:

- Male – 555
- Female – 547
- American Indian/Alaska Native – 3
- Asian – 10
- Black – 8
- Hispanic – 47
- Native Hawaiian/Pacific Islander– 0
- White – 996
- Two or More Races – 38

320 of the 1,102 students were eligible for free or reduced-cost lunch.

== Notable alumni ==
- Betsy Brandt – actress
- Matt Costello – professional basketball player
- Matt Mieske – professional baseball player
- Robert Rechsteiner a.k.a. Rick Steiner – professional wrestler
- Scott Rechsteiner a.k.a. Scott Steiner – professional wrestler
