= Matt Costello =

American basketball player (born 1993)

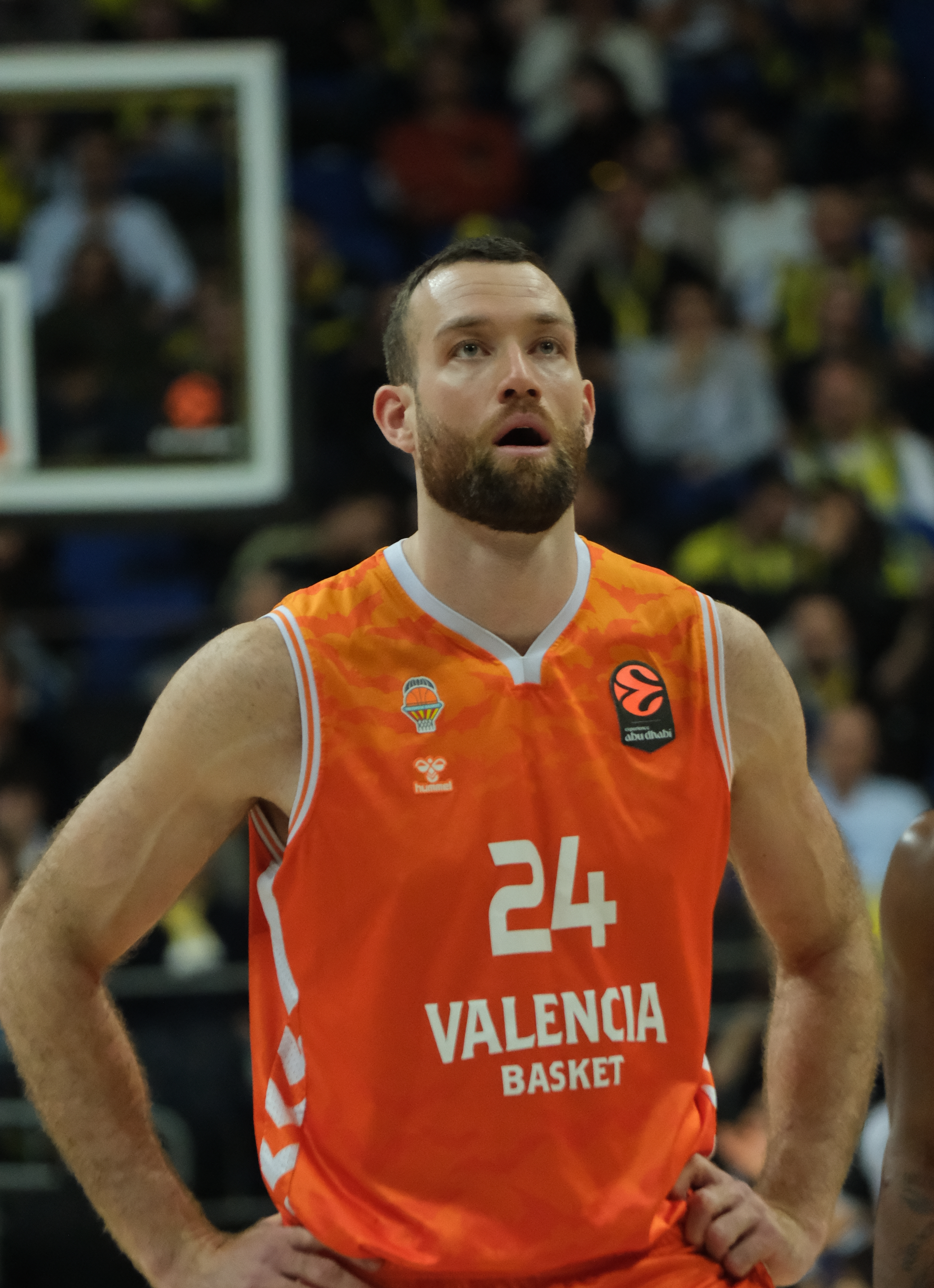
- Costello with Valencia in 2026

No. 24 – Chiba Jets
- Position: Center / power forward
- League: B.League

Personal information
- Born: August 5, 1993 (age 33) Linwood, Michigan, U.S.
- Listed height: 6 ft 10 in (2.08 m)
- Listed weight: 240 lb (109 kg)

Career information
- High school: Bay City Western (Auburn, Michigan)
- College: Michigan State (2012–2016)
- NBA draft: 2016: undrafted
- Playing career: 2016–present

Career history
- 2016–2017: Iowa Energy
- 2017–2018: San Antonio Spurs
- 2017–2018: →Austin Spurs
- 2018–2019: Sidigas Avellino
- 2019–2021: Gran Canaria
- 2021–2024: Baskonia
- 2024–2026: Valencia
- 2026–present: Chiba Jets

Career highlights
- EuroCup blocks leader (2021); NBA G League champion (2018); Liga ACB champion (2026); Spanish Supercup winner (2025); Second-team All-Big Ten – Media (2016); Third-team All-Big Ten – Coaches (2016); First-team Parade All-American (2012); Michigan Mr. Basketball (2012)
- Stats at NBA.com
- Stats at Basketball Reference
Medals
AfroBasket
Men's basketball
Representing Ivory Coast
Silver medal – second place	2021 Rwanda

Matthew Tyler Costello (born August 5, 1993) is an American-born naturalized Ivorian professional basketball player for the Chiba Jets of the Japanese B.League. He played college basketball for the Michigan State Spartans.

== High school career ==
Costello was heavily recruited coming out of Bay City Western High School.

- 2012 Hal Schram Mr. Basketball Award winner
- 2012 Gatorade Michigan High School Player of the Year
- 2012 Parade Magazine All-American
- 2x Detroit Free Press and The Detroit News Dream Team
- 2011 Gatorade Michigan High School Player of the Year

Costello averaged 25.1 points, 19.1 rebounds, 4.0 assists and 4.0 blocks per game at Bay City Western for Coach Chris Watz. Costello led the Warriors to the Class 4A regional semifinals, an 18–6 record, and a second-straight district championship. He finished his career as the school's all-time leader in points (1,518), rebounds (1,069) and blocked shots (280). He was one of the best recruits in the country. He ranked among the top-100 players in the nation by the following:

- Rivals.com (#83)(#21 power forward)
- ESPNU100 (#87) (#17 power forward)
- Scout.com (#95) (#23 center)

He averaged 19.8 points, 13.0 rebounds and 3.8 blocks as a junior, shooting 53.4 percent from the field and 72 percent from the foul line. Costello posted a school-record 19 double-doubles. He helped his team improve from 10 to 11 in 2010 to 24–3 in 2011, leading Bay City Western to Class A state semifinals for the first time in school history. His stats earned him MVP of Saginaw Valley Association. Costello averaged 16.7 points 11.8 rebounds, 3 blocks and 3 assists as a sophomore and set a school record with 14 blocks in a single game. In 2010 Bay City Times named him to the Dream Team and first-team All-Saginaw Valley League selection. He was a National Honor Society member.

== College career ==
=== Freshman year ===
As a freshman, Costello appeared in 30 games, averaging 6.1 minutes,1.5 points and 1.3 rebounds, shooting .469 from the field. His .824 free-throw percentage (14–17) was tops on the team. He ranked fourth on the team with 13 blocks, averaging a block every 14.2 minutes. Playing time increased when he averaged 8.0 minutes in the last 13 games after playing more than eight minutes just once in the first 23 games. Costello turned in one of his best games in a 75–52 win over No. 4 Michigan (2/12), scoring a season-high eight points and grabbing a Big Ten season-high six rebounds, hitting all three field goal attempts and both free throw attempts. He scored six points and grabbed a season-high seven rebounds against Tuskegee (12/15), blocked a season-high three shots against No. 1 Indiana (2/19), and blocked two shots each against Texas Southern (11/18), Nebraska (2/16) and Valparaiso (3/21) in the second round of the NCAA Tournament. Costello missed the first two games of the season and both exhibition games with a bruised back.

=== Sophomore year ===
Costello appeared in 34 games, starting 20, averaging 4.0 points and 3.3 rebounds in 14.7 minutes per contest, He led the team with 43 blocks, ranking 10th in the Big Ten (1.3 bpg). His 43 blocks were the seventh-best single-season total in school history, and the most ever by a Spartan sophomore. He blocked 24 shots in Big Ten contests (1.3 bpg), ranking eighth in the conference. Costello ranked second on the team in field-goal percentage (.598) In December he missed 4 games due to mononucleosis. He posted his first career double-double in an overtime win at Iowa (1/28), scoring a season-high 11 points and grabbing a career-high 12 rebounds; nine of his 11 points came in the last five minutes of regulation and overtime. Costello scored 10 points against Penn State (2/6), adding six rebounds and a season-high tying three assists as well as dishing out three assists against Columbia (11/15) Costello scored six or more points in 10 contests and grabbed five or more rebounds in eight games • Tallied nine points and eight rebounds against Michigan (1/25) • Also scored nine points against Northwestern (2/13) • Tallied seven points and eight rebounds against Minnesota (1/11) He made improvements on playing time and started 13 of 18 Big Ten contests, averaging 4.9 points and 3.6 rebounds in conference games Costello made history when he blocked a career-best six shots at Illinois (1/18), tying the second-best single-game effort in MSU history. He blocked two or more shots in 10 contests. At the end of the year, he received Academic All-Big Ten honors.

=== Junior year ===
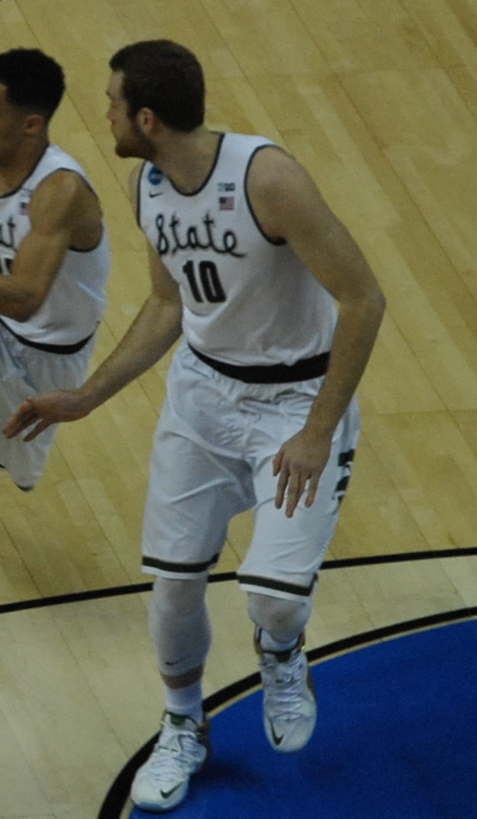
Costello playing for Michigan State

Costello appeared in 39 games, starting six, averaging 7.0 points and 5.0 rebounds in 20.4 minutes. He shot .579 from the floor, ranking second among teammates with more than 100 field-goal attempts. Costello ranked 13th in the Big Ten in blocked shots overall (1.2 bpg) and seventh in Big Ten games (1.5 bpg). His 48 blocks rank as the seventh-best single-season total in MSU history. Costello managed to score in double figures in 11 games and grabbed double-figure rebounds in two contests. He posted two double-doubles vs. Loyola (11/21; 13 points, 11 rebounds) and Texas Southern (12/20; 17 pts., 10 reb.). Costello was a team leader in many categories and led MSU in scoring in two games and in rebounding in eight contests. He scored a career-best 17 points against Texas Southern (12/20) and scored 15 points against Arkansas-Pine Bluff (12/6). His season-high of 11 rebounds came against Loyola (11/21). He blocked two or more shots in 13 games, including a season-high four against Michigan (2/1) and Purdue (3/4). Costello grabbed seven or more rebounds in 14 contests, including five games with nine or more boards. He started the first six games of the season, then came off the bench for the final 33 contests. At the end of the year, he received Academic All-Big Ten honors. With Costello commanding the post, the Spartans were able to reach the 2015 Final Four.

=== Senior year ===
During Costello's senior year, he made many improvements to his game. Because of this, he received many end of the year awards. He currently has the third-most blocks all-time in Michigan State basketball history. Costello was honored with a selection to the Reese's College All-Star game in Houston, Texas.

- CBS-BigTen 2nd Team
- BigTen 2nd Team Media
- BigTen 3rd Team Coaches
- Bleacher Report Team of the Week; Week 11
- Sports Illustrated- All Glue Team (Captain)
- Reese's College All Star Game
- Portsmouth Invitational Tournament
- PIT All-Tournament Team

== Professional career ==
=== Iowa Energy (2016–2017) ===
After going undrafted in the 2016 NBA draft, Costello joined the Atlanta Hawks for the 2016 NBA Summer League. In six Summer League games, he averaged 5.7 points and 5 rebounds in 18.2 minutes. On July 26, 2016, he signed with the Hawks,. Costello played in two preseason games (October 6 versus the Grizzlies and OCtoebr versus the Spurs) and recorded a total of 8 points, 7 rebounds and 1 assists across both games. He was later waived by the Hawks on October 17.

On October 20, Costello He signed with the Memphis Grizzlies but was waived on October 24, two days before the start of the regular season.

Five days later, he was acquired by the Iowa Energy of the NBA Development League as an affiliate player of the Grizzlies. Costello's debut game for the Energy was played on November 11 where the team fell to the South Bay Lakers 98 - 127 despite Costello's 14 points, 13 rebounds and 3 assists effort. In a total of 23 games for the Energy, Costello averaged 9.5 points, 10.2 rebounds and 1.9 assists in 25.3 minutes per game. Despite a strong statline from Costello, the Energy only earned one victory out of the 23 games that he played with the team. Costello also did not play in any of the 25 games with the Energy from December 23, 2016, to March 5, 2017.

=== San Antonio Spurs (2017–2018) ===
In the summer of 2017, Costello would play for two different Summer league teams, the Orlando Magic and Minnesota Timberwolves. In three games for the Magic he averaged 5 points, 4.7 rebounds and 2 assists in three games. For the Timberwolves, he averaged 11.2 points, 12 rebounds and 2.5 assists in four games.

On July 24, 2017, Costello signed a two-way contract with the San Antonio Spurs. Under a two-way contract, he divided time between the Spurs and San Antonio's G-League affiliate, the Austin Spurs. During Spurs pre-season, he averaged 3 points and 5.2 rebounds in 4 games. He then made his debut for the Austin Spurs on November 3, recording 17 points and 11 rebounds in a blowout win against the Salt Lake City Stars 131 - 88.

Costello finally made his NBA debut on November 12 in a blowout 133–94 win over the Chicago Bulls. In his debut, he recorded 2 points, 5 rebounds and 2 blocks in 10 minutes of playing time. He would play most of the 2017 - 2018 season with the Austin Spurs, specifically playing in 30 of the team's 50 regular season games (winning 18 of those 30) and averaging 8.1 points and 7 rebounds in 22 minutes per game. The Austin Spurs finished that season with the best record in the league tied with the Westchester Knicks at 32 - 18 and would go on to win the 2018 G - League Championship. In the championship game against the Raptors 905 on April 10, 2018, Costello recorded 6 points, 7 rebounds and 4 assists.

For the main roster, Costello only played 3 other games with the Spurs, a 107 - 100 win over the Sacramento Kings on January 8, 2018, a 81 - 93 loss to the Los Angeles Lakers on January 11 and a 93 - 109 loss to the Houston Rockets on March 12. In those four games with the San Antonio Spurs, Costello averaged 1 point and 2.3 rebounds in 8 minutes per game.

=== Scandone Avellino (2018–2019) ===
On August 2, 2018, Costello signed a deal with the Italian club Sidigas Avellino of the LBA.

=== Gran Canaria (2019–2021) ===
Costello averaged 11.4 points and 7.8 rebounds per game for Gran Canaria during the 2019–20 season. He inked a two-year contract extension on June 25, 2020. During the 2020–21 season, Costello averaged 12.5 points, 5.9 rebounds and 1.2 assists in the Liga ACB, as well as 10.2 points, 6.5 rebounds and 1.7 assists in the EuroCup.

=== Baskonia (2021–2024) ===
On July 5, 2021, Costello officially signed a three-year contract with fellow Liga ACB club Baskonia, marking his EuroLeague debut.

=== Valencia Basket (2024–2026) ===
On July 2, 2024, he signed with Valencia of the Spanish Liga ACB. In July 2026, Costello officially parted ways with the team.

=== Chiba Jets (2026–present) ===
On July 13, 2026, Costello signed with the Chiba Jets of the Japanese B.League.

== National team career ==
Costello was granted the Ivorian citizenship and played with the Ivory Coast national basketball team during AfroBasket 2021.

== Personal life ==
Costello is the son of Mike and Jen Costello. He majored in interdisciplinary studies in social science with a concentration in human capital and society.

== Career statistics ==
Legend
GP	Games played	GS	Games started	MPG	Minutes per game
FG%	Field-goal percentage	3P%	3-point field-goal percentage	FT%	Free-throw percentage
RPG	Rebounds per game	APG	Assists per game	SPG	Steals per game
BPG	Blocks per game	PPG	Points per game	PIR	Performance index rating
**Bold**	Career high

=== NBA ===
Year	Team	GP	GS	MPG	FG%	3P%	FT%	RPG	APG	SPG	BPG	PPG
2017–18	San Antonio	4	0	8.1	.500	—	—	2.2	.5	.5	.5	1.0
Career		4	0	8.1	.500	—	—	2.2	.5	.5	.5	1.0

=== EuroLeague ===
Year	Team	GP	GS	MPG	FG%	3P%	FT%	RPG	APG	SPG	BPG	PPG	PIR
2021–22	Baskonia	27	**14**	21.9	**.505**	.323	**.792**	**5.1**	1.3	.4	**.9**	9.1	**11.7**
2022–23	Baskonia	**34**	5	20.0	.498	**.360**	.708	4.2	1.5	.6	**.9**	9.3	10.7
2023–24	Baskonia	33	13	**22.2**	.479	.319	.684	4.2	**1.7**	**.7**	.8	**9.7**	10.2
Career		94	32	21.3	.493	.334	.728	4.5	1.5	.6	.9	9.4	10.8

=== EuroCup ===
Year	Team	GP	GS	MPG	FG%	3P%	FT%	RPG	APG	SPG	BPG	PPG	PIR
2020–21	Gran Canaria	17	7	22.5	.489	.450	.683	6.5	1.7	.2	1.8	10.2	14.2
Career		17	7	22.5	.489	.450	.683	6.5	1.7	.2	1.8	10.2	14.2

=== Basketball Champions League ===
Year	Team	GP	GS	MPG	FG%	3P%	FT%	RPG	APG	SPG	BPG	PPG
2018–19	Felice Scandone	4	4	27.9	.647	.333	.588	9.2	.7	.2	.2	13.7
Career		4	4	27.9	.647	.333	.588	9.2	.7	.2	.2	13.7

=== Domestic leagues ===
Year	Team	League	GP	MPG	FG%	3P%	FT%	RPG	APG	SPG	BPG	PPG
2016–17	(United States) Iowa Energy	D-League	23	25.3	.512	.184	.774	10.2	1.9	.6	1.6	9.5
2017–18	(United States) Austin Spurs	G League	30	22.0	.511	.366	.791	7.0	1.9	.8	2.2	8.1
2018–19	(Italy) Felice Scandone	LBA	6	21.8	.611	.000	.600	6.3	1.3	.5	.7	8.8
2019–20	(Spain) Gran Canaria	ACB	27	22.2	.518	.348	.784	7.6	1.4	.7	1.2	11.1
2020–21	(Spain) Gran Canaria	ACB	31	23.5	.482	.397	.741	5.9	1.2	.5	1.1	12.5
2021–22	(Spain) Baskonia	ACB	37	19.3	.464	.374	.784	5.5	1.5	.6	1.2	9.5
2022–23	(Spain) Baskonia	ACB	33	21.1	.509	.320	.718	5.6	1.8	.7	1.4	9.9
2023–24	(Spain) Baskonia	ACB	30	22.7	.547	.403	.745	4.8	1.4	.5	.9	11.9

=== College ===
Year	Team	GP	GS	MPG	FG%	3P%	FT%	RPG	APG	SPG	BPG	PPG
2012–13	Michigan State	30	0	6.1	.469	—	.824	1.3	.2	.2	.4	1.5
2013–14	Michigan State	34	21	14.7	.598	—	.660	3.3	.8	.3	1.3	4.0
2014–15	Michigan State	39	6	20.4	.579	.000	.671	5.2	.7	.4	1.2	7.0
2015–16	Michigan State	35	35	22.9	.561	.250	.752	8.2	1.3	.7	1.2	10.7
Career		138	62	16.5	.567	.167	.713	4.7	.8	.4	1.1	6.0
