= Bay City Central High School =

Location
- 1624 Columbus Avenue; Bay City, Michigan 48708; United States; 43°35′19″N 83°52′26″W

Information
- Type: Secondary
- Motto: High Expectations. High Standards. No Excuses.
- Established: 1922
- School district: Bay City Public Schools
- Superintendent: Grant Hegenauer
- CEEB code: 230205
- NCES School ID: 260426004094
- Principal: Justin Shaner
- Teaching staff: 54.50 (FTE)
- Enrollment: 989 (2023-24)
- Student to teacher ratio: 18.15
- Colors: Purple and gold
- Athletics: Football, cross country, basketball, baseball, swimming, tennis, golf, wrestling, track, basketball, soccer, volleyball, ice hockey, softball, competitive cheer, bowling (club), lacrosse
- Nickname: Wolves
- Rival: Bay City Western
- Accreditation: North Central Association
- Publication: Crest literary magazine
- Newspaper: The Centralia Edition
- Yearbook: Centralia
- Website: chs.bcschools.net

Bay City Central High School (BCC) is a high school located at 1624 Columbus Avenue, Bay City, Michigan, United States, and a part of Bay City Public Schools. Its mascot is the wolf, and its colors are purple and gold.

== Building history ==
The building that is now known as Bay City Central opened March 27, 1922. The original architectural plans called for two floors, but a third was added to provide room for Bay City Junior College (which now exists as Delta College, and is now located in University Center, Michigan). The "New Gymnasium" was constructed in 1957, and the cafeteria/commons received major renovations in 1995. The school's bell tower (which contains two classrooms), as well as a copper-domed observatory on the roof was closed in 1983 due to fire code restrictions and remains unopened to this day.

== Demographics ==
The demographic breakdown of the 989 students enrolled in 2023-24 was:

- White – 65.1%
- Hispanic – 16.2%
- Black – 6.2%
- American Indian/Alaska Native – 0.7%
- Asian – 0.5%
- Native Hawaiian/Pacific Islander – <0.1%
- Two or More Races – 11.3%

—

- Male – 49.0%
- Female – 51.0%

64.45% of the students were eligible for free or reduced-cost lunch.

== Performing arts ==
=== Band ===
The high school band program hosts several bands like the Jazz Lab, and Central Air Jazz Band, two different steel drum bands, Symphony, and Wind Symphony, and formerly the Bay Youth Symphony Orchestra. The marching band is the "Oldest Continuous Marching Band In Michigan".

=== Radio ===
BCC is the location of the studios and transmitter for WCHW-FM, 91.3, a low power non-commercial FM station run by the students of the Bay City School District.

=== Choirs ===
Bay City Central's choir line-up includes mixed choir, concert choir and award-winning varsity choir, Resounding Harmony. It also has small a cappella ensembles, The Girls, The Guys and 6 a.m.

== Notable alumni ==
- Bob Allman – American football player
- Warren Avis – founder of Avis Rent a Car
- Bill Hewitt – American football player
- Heidi J. Hoyle – United States Army general
- Tyler McVey – actor
- Trenton Robinson – American football player
- Myra C. Selby – Indiana Supreme Court, first African-American female Justice of the State of Indiana
- John List – mass murderer
