= Bay City Public Schools =

School district headquartered in Bay City, Michigan

Address
- 601 Blend St. Bay City, Bay County, Michigan; United States
- Coordinates: 43.606111°N 83.909167°W

District information
- Type: Public
- Grades: Pre-school - 12
- Established: 1867; 159 years ago
- Superintendent: Grant Hegenauer
- Schools: 13
- Budget: US$102,493,000 (2021-22)
- NCES District ID: 2604260

Students and staff
- Students: 6,180 (2023-24)
- Teachers: 368.22 FTE (2023-24)
- Staff: 791.24 FTE (2023-24)
- Student–teacher ratio: 16.78 (2023-2024)

Other information
- Website: bcschools.net

Bay City Public Schools is a public school district in Bay County, Michigan. It serves Bay City, Auburn, Monitor Township, Williams Township, and parts of Beaver Township, Frankenlust Township, Hampton Township, Merritt Township, and Portsmouth Township. It also serves a small portion of Saginaw County, including parts of the townships of Buena Vista, Kochville, and Zilwaukee.

== History ==
The first school in Bay City was begun in 1842. A union school district was formed in 1867, which evolved into the present school district. The district's first high school was built in 1869. It was succeeded by the following high school buildings:

- A new high school opened on the East Side on March 27, 1882.
- On March 27, 1922, it was replaced by Central High School.
- In 1923, Handy Middle School was established as T.L. Handy Junior High School. It became T.L. Handy High School in 1946, and returned to use as a middle school in 1990.
- Bay City Western High School opened in Auburn in September, 1973.

== Leadership ==
=== Superintendent ===
In February 2025 the Board of Education voted unanimously to select Frankenmuth School District Superintendent Grant Hegenauer as the district's next Superintendent. Hegenauer began his duties on July 1, 2025.

=== Board of Education ===
Member	Position	In office since
Joslyn Jamrog	President	2021
Matthew Felan	Vice President	2020
Carrie Sepeda	Secretary	2015
Mike Kelly	Treasurer	2023
Laurie Jeske	Trustee	2017
Wendy Legner	Trustee	2025
Mason Pressler	Trustee	2025

== Schools ==
Schools in Bay City Public Schools district
School	Address	Notes
High Schools (Grades 9–12)
Bay City Central High School	1624 Columbus Ave., Bay City	Built 1922.
Bay City Western High School	500 W. Midland Rd., Auburn	Built 1973.
Bay City Eastern High School	601 Blend St., Bay City	Alternative high school housed at Handy Middle School
Middle Schools (Grades 6–8)
Handy Middle School	601 Blend St., Bay City	Built 1922.
Western Middle School	501 W. Auburn Rd., Auburn	
Elementary Schools (Grades PreK–5)
Auburn Elementary	301 E. Midland Rd., Auburn	
Hampton Elementary	1908 W. Youngs Ditch Rd., Bay City	
Kolb Elementary	305 W. Crump St., Bay City	Includes the district's Gifted and Talented Program.
MacGregor Elementary	1012 Fremont St., Bay City	
Mackensen Elementary	5535 Dennis Dr., Bay City	
McAlear-Sawden Elementary	2300 Midland Rd., Bay City	
Washington Elementary	1821 McKinley Ave., Bay City	Built 1959.

=== Former schools ===
- Bay City Wenona School - Opened in 1962 and closed in 2006, remained unused as of 2015
- Thomas Jefferson School - Opened in 1959 and closed in 2006, Demolished in 2016 and converted into the Janet Jopke Tennis Courts at Richard Shaw Park
- Riegel School - Opened in either 1970 or 1971 and closed in 2006, used by Bay City Public Schools as a storage facility as of 2015
- Trombley School - Opened in 1952, closed in 2002, Scheduled for Demolition in 2015 and demolished soon afterwards.
