= Carl Loyd =

American basketball player (1925–2012)

Personal information
- Born: November 24, 1925 Bush, Illinois, U.S.
- Died: August 29, 2012 (aged 86) Roseland, Indiana, U.S.
- Listed height: 5 ft 11 in (1.80 m)
- Listed weight: 170 lb (77 kg)

Career information
- High school: Woodrow Wilson (South Bend, Indiana)
- College: Notre Dame (1943–1944, 1946–1947)
- BAA draft: 1947: undrafted
- Position: Guard

Career history
- 1948–1949: Hammond Calumet Buccaneers

Carl E. Loyd (November 24, 1925 – August 29, 2012) was an American professional basketball player. He played for the Hammond Calumet Buccaneers in the National Basketball League during the 1948–49 season and averaged 3.3 points per game. Serving in the Navy during World War II split his collegiate career at the University of Notre Dame.
