= Joe Camic =

American basketball player

Personal information
- Born: November 28, 1922 Youngstown, Ohio, U.S.
- Died: April 3, 2011 (aged 88) Duquesne, Pennsylvania, U.S.
- Listed height: 6 ft 4 in (1.93 m)
- Listed weight: 195 lb (88 kg)

Career information
- High school: Rankin (Rankin, Pennsylvania)
- College: Duquesne (1941–1943, 1946–1947)
- NBA draft: 1947: undrafted
- Position: Guard / forward

Career history
- 1947–1949: Tri-Cities Blackhawks
- 1949: Hammond Calumet Buccaneers

Joseph John Camic Jr. (November 28, 1922 – April 3, 2011) was an American professional basketball player. He played for the Tri-Cities Blackhawks and Hammond Calumet Buccaneers in the National Basketball League and averaged 6.3 points per game.
