= Hal Devoll =

American basketball player

Personal information
- Born: September 29, 1923 Detroit, Michigan, U.S.
- Died: January 12, 2010 (aged 86) Allen Park, Michigan, U.S.
- Listed height: 6 ft 6 in (1.98 m)
- Listed weight: 210 lb (95 kg)

Career information
- College: Lawrence Tech (1946–1947)
- Position: Forward / center

Career history
- 1948: Detroit Vagabond Kings
- 1948–1949: Hammond Calumet Buccaneers
- 1953–1954: Detroit Vagabond Kings

Harold Reed Devoll (September 29, 1923 – January 12, 2010) was an American professional basketball player. He played in the National Basketball League for the Detroit Vagabond Kings and Hammond Calumet Buccaneers during the 1948–49 season and averaged 4.6 points per game.
