= Jake Carter (basketball) =

American basketball player

Personal information
- Born: July 25, 1924 Larue, Texas, U.S.
- Died: April 17, 2012 (aged 87) Lubbock, Texas, U.S.
- Listed height: 6 ft 4 in (1.93 m)
- Listed weight: 195 lb (88 kg)

Career information
- College: East Texas A&M (1942–1943, 1945–1948)
- NBA draft: 1948: – round, –
- Drafted by: Baltimore Bullets
- Playing career: 1948–1951
- Position: Power forward / center

Career history
- 1948–1949: Hammond Calumet Buccaneers
- 1949–1950: Denver Nuggets
- 1950: Anderson Packers
- 1950–1951: Kansas City Hi-Spots

Career NBA statistics
- Points: 82 (3.4 ppg)
- Assists: 24 (1.0 apg)
- Games played: 24
- Stats at NBA.com
- Stats at Basketball Reference

John Douglas "Jake" Carter (July 25, 1924 – April 17, 2012) was an American basketball player. He played collegiately for East Texas State University (now East Texas A&M University). He was then selected by the Baltimore Bullets in the 1948 BAA Draft. He later played with the Denver Nuggets and Anderson Packers (1949–50) in the National Basketball Association (NBA) for 24 games.

== Career statistics ==
=== NBA ===
Legend
| GP | Games played | GS | Games started | MPG | Minutes per game |
| FG% | Field goal percentage | 3P% | 3-point field goal percentage | FT% | Free throw percentage |
| RPG | Rebounds per game | APG | Assists per game | SPG | Steals per game |
| BPG | Blocks per game | PPG | Points per game | **Bold** | Career high |

==== Regular season ====
| Year | Team | GP | FG% | FT% | APG | PPG |
|---|---|---|---|---|---|---|
| 1949–50 | Denver | **13** | .289 | **.692** | **1.2** | 3.4 |
| 1949–50 | Anderson | 11 | **.333** | .667 | .7 | **3.5** |
| Career | | 24 | .307 | .679 | 1.0 | 3.4 |

==== Playoffs ====
| Year | Team | GP | FG% | FT% | APG | PPG |
|---|---|---|---|---|---|---|
| 1949–50 | Anderson | 8 | .143 | .667 | .4 | 1.3 |
