= Johnny Sebastian =

American basketball player

Personal information
- Born: November 20, 1921 Odin, Illinois, U.S.
- Died: April 26, 2003 (aged 81) Champaign, Illinois, U.S.
- Listed height: 6 ft 0 in (1.83 m)
- Listed weight: 185 lb (84 kg)

Career information
- High school: Odin (Odin, Illinois); Salem (Salem, Illinois)
- College: Southern Illinois (1941–1943, 1946–1947)
- Playing career: 1947–1952
- Position: Guard

Career history

Playing
- 1947–1948: Syracuse Nationals
- 1948: St. Paul Saints
- 1948: Detroit Vagabond Kings
- 1948–1949: Hammond Calumet Buccaneers
- 1949: House of David
- 1949–1951: Detroit Vagabond Kings
- 1950–1952: Boston Whirlwinds
- 1952: Chicago Majors

Coaching
- 1952–1953: Lake View HS

John T. Sebastian Jr. (November 20, 1921 – April 26, 2003) was an American professional basketball player. He played in numerous leagues, including the National Basketball League. In the NBL, Sebastian played for the Syracuse Nationals, Hammond Calumet Buccaneers, and Detroit Vagabond Kings and averaged 8.0 points per game. At one time he held the Guinness Record for consecutive made free throws made while blindfolded (63).
