= Doyle Cofer =

American basketball player

Personal information
- Born: January 18, 1923 Bruceville, Indiana, U.S.
- Died: January 15, 1999 (aged 75) Noblesville, Indiana, U.S.
- Listed height: 6 ft 4 in (1.93 m)

Career information
- College: Indiana State (1945–1946)
- Position: Forward

Career history
- 1946–1947: Terre Haute Commercial Solvents Norways
- 1947–1948: Terre Haute Flamingos
- 1948: Detroit Vagabond Kings
- 1948–1949: House of David
- 1949–1950: New York Celtics
- 1950: Indiana Clark Twins

Doyle Cofer (January 18, 1923 – January 15, 1999) was an American professional basketball player. He played in the National Basketball League for the Detroit Vagabond Kings during the 1948–49 season and averaged 3.4 points per game.

He spent one season as a member of the Indiana State Sycamores. In his lone season, the Sycamores reached the finals of the 1946 NAIA Division I men's basketball tournament, they were led by Glenn Curtis.

A civil engineer after basketball, Cofer was killed at age 75 in an accident when he was trying to load a bulldozer onto a flatbed. The bulldozer toppled over and crushed him.
