= Ken Campbell (basketball) =

American basketball player (1926–1999)

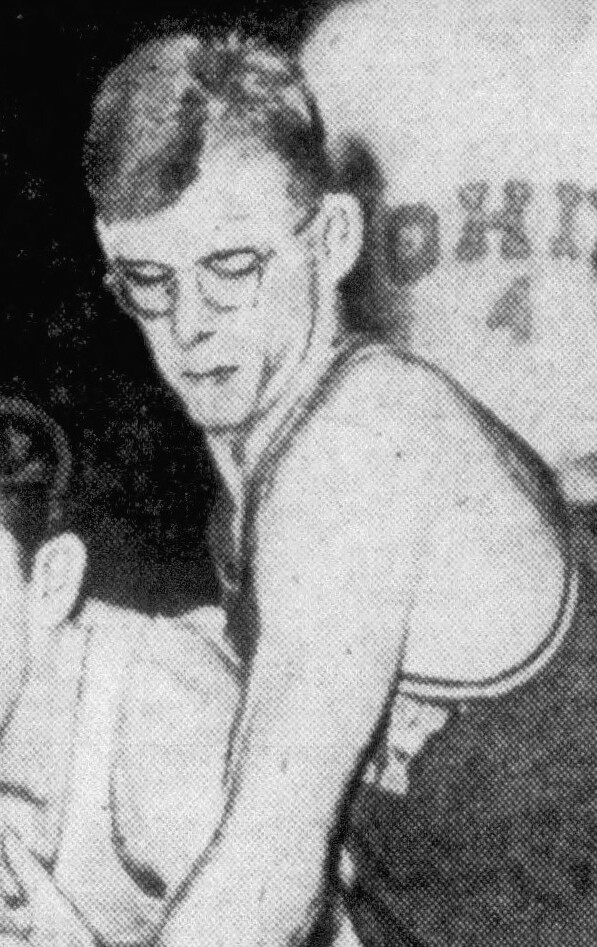
- Campbell in 1945

Personal information
- Born: June 10, 1926 Ohio, U.S.
- Died: October 6, 1999 (aged 73) Maitland, Florida, U.S.
- Listed height: 6 ft 4 in (1.93 m)
- Listed weight: 195 lb (88 kg)

Career information
- High school: Newark (Newark, Ohio)
- College: Kentucky (1944–1948)
- NBA draft: 1948: undrafted
- Position: Forward

Career history

Playing
- 1948: Saratoga Indians
- 1948–1949: Hammond Calumet Buccaneers

Coaching
- 195?–195?: Harrison County HS

Career highlights
- First-team All-SEC (1945)

Albert Kenton Campbell (June 10, 1926 – October 6, 1999) was an American professional basketball player. He played in the National Basketball League for the Hammond Calumet Buccaneers during the 1948–49 season and averaged 5.0 points per game. He played both football and basketball at the University of Kentucky.
