= Ted Cook (basketball) =

American basketball player (1921–1990)

Personal information
- Born: April 15, 1921 Beckley, West Virginia, U.S.
- Died: May 19, 1990 (aged 69) Knoxville, Tennessee, U.S.
- Listed height: 6 ft 0 in (1.83 m)
- Listed weight: 160 lb (73 kg)

Career information
- High school: Woodrow Wilson (Beckley, West Virginia)
- College: Tennessee (1941–1943, 1946–1947)
- NBA draft: 1947: undrafted
- Playing career: 1947–1949
- Position: Guard

Career history
- 1947: Minneapolis Lakers
- 1947–1949: Snead Florists
- 1948: Sheboygan Red Skins
- 1949: Hammond Calumet Buccaneers

Theodore Walker Cook (April 15, 1921 – May 19, 1990) was an American professional basketball player. He played for several teams in the National Basketball League, each for only a handful of games, and averaged 0.6 points per game. After basketball he became he Director of Recreation in Beckley, West Virginia.

== Early life and education ==
Cook attended Woodrow Wilson High School in Beckley, West Virginia. He served as an officer in the United States Army Reserve and trained military working dogs during World War II.
