= Auburn, Michigan =

- City
- City of Auburn
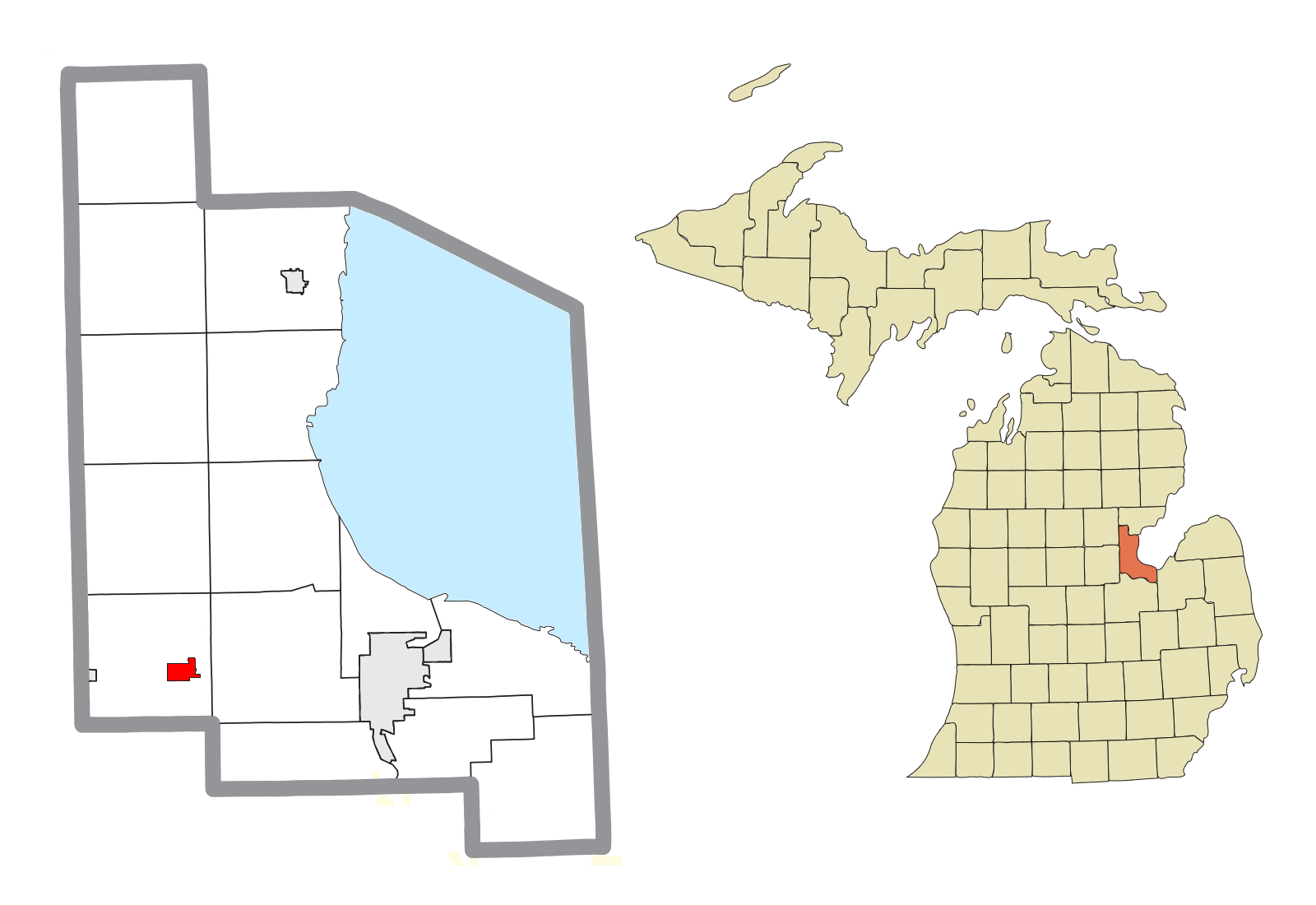
- Location within Bay County

- Location within the state of Michigan
- Coordinates: 43°36′10″N 84°04′26″W
- Country: United States
- State: Michigan
- County: Bay
- Settled: 1854
- Incorporated: 1947

Government
  - Type: City commission
  - Mayor: Lee Kilbourn
  - Administrator: David Haag

Area
  - Total: 1.06 sq mi (2.74 km^{2})
  - Land: 1.05 sq mi (2.73 km^{2})
  - Water: 0.0039 sq mi (0.01 km^{2})
- Elevation: 617 ft (188 m)

Population (2020)
  - Total: 2,068
  - Density: 1,958.9/sq mi (756.33/km^{2})
- Time zone: UTC-5 (Eastern (EST))
  - Summer (DST): UTC-4 (EDT)
- ZIP code(s): 48611
- Area code: 989
- FIPS code: 26-04080
- GNIS feature ID: 0620334
- Website: Official website

Auburn is a city in Bay County, Michigan, United States. The city's population was 2,068 at the 2020 Census. It is included in the Saginaw, Midland, and Bay City metropolitan area.

== History ==
It was first settled in 1854. On February 26, 1869, the settlement was granted a post office with the name of Skinner. On November 19, 1877, the Skinner Post Office was renamed Auburn. The unincorporated community incorporated as a city in 1947. The default Zip Code of 48611 is shared by Williams Township (which surrounds the city), and much of southwestern Bay County.

== Geography ==
According to the United States Census Bureau, the city has a total area of 1.06 square miles (2.75 km^{2}), of which 1.05 square miles (2.72 km^{2}) is land and 0.01 square miles (0.03 km^{2}) is water.

== Demographics ==
Historical population
Census	Pop.	Note	%±
1950	869		—
1960	1,497		72.3%
1970	1,919		28.2%
1980	1,921		0.1%
1990	1,855		−3.4%
2000	2,011		8.4%
2010	2,087		3.8%
2020	2,068		−0.9%
U.S. Decennial Census

=== 2020 census ===
As of the 2020 census, Auburn had a population of 2,068. The median age was 42.9 years. 21.1% of residents were under the age of 18 and 21.0% of residents were 65 years of age or older. For every 100 females there were 88.5 males, and for every 100 females age 18 and over there were 84.5 males age 18 and over.

99.3% of residents lived in urban areas, while 0.7% lived in rural areas.

There were 940 households in Auburn, of which 27.2% had children under the age of 18 living in them. Of all households, 40.3% were married-couple households, 18.9% were households with a male householder and no spouse or partner present, and 34.5% were households with a female householder and no spouse or partner present. About 36.2% of all households were made up of individuals and 16.3% had someone living alone who was 65 years of age or older.

There were 972 housing units, of which 3.3% were vacant. The homeowner vacancy rate was 0.5% and the rental vacancy rate was 4.6%.

Racial composition as of the 2020 census
Race	Number	Percent
White	1,921	92.9%
Black or African American	16	0.8%
American Indian and Alaska Native	5	0.2%
Asian	5	0.2%
Native Hawaiian and Other Pacific Islander	0	0.0%
Some other race	12	0.6%
Two or more races	109	5.3%
Hispanic or Latino (of any race)	60	2.9%

=== 2010 census ===
As of the census of 2010, there were 2,087 people, 916 households, and 551 families living in the city. The population density was 1,987.6 inhabitants per square mile (767.4/km^{2}). There were 960 housing units at an average density of 914.3 per square mile (353.0/km^{2}). The racial makeup of the city was 97.5% White, 0.3% African American, 0.8% Native American, 0.5% Asian, 0.1% Pacific Islander, 0.3% from other races, and 0.5% from two or more races. Hispanic or Latino of any race were 2.0% of the population.

There were 916 households, of which 28.2% had children under the age of 18 living with them, 43.2% were married couples living together, 12.7% had a female householder with no husband present, 4.3% had a male householder with no wife present, and 39.8% were non-families. 34.5% of all households were made up of individuals, and 13.5% had someone living alone who was 65 years of age or older. The average household size was 2.24 and the average family size was 2.87.

The median age in the city was 40.9 years. 22% of residents were under the age of 18; 9.1% were between the ages of 18 and 24; 24.3% were from 25 to 44; 27.1% were from 45 to 64; and 17.6% were 65 years of age or older. The gender makeup of the city was 47.6% male and 52.4% female.

=== 2000 census ===
As of the census of 2000, there were 2,011 people, 842 households, and 553 families living in the city. The population density was 1,971.6 inhabitants per square mile (761.2/km^{2}). There were 867 housing units at an average density of 850.0 per square mile (328.2/km^{2}). The racial makeup of the city was 97.51% White, 0.35% African American, 0.55% Native American, 0.30% Asian, 0.35% from other races, and 0.94% from two or more races. Hispanic or Latino of any race were 2.39% of the population.

There were 842 households, out of which 32.5% had children under the age of 18 living with them, 50.4% were married couples living together, 13.2% had a female householder with no husband present, and 34.3% were non-families. 29.1% of all households were made up of individuals, and 9.6% had someone living alone who was 65 years of age or older. The average household size was 2.37 and the average family size was 2.97.

In the city, the population was spread out, with 25.6% under the age of 18, 8.4% from 18 to 24, 29.8% from 25 to 44, 22.6% from 45 to 64, and 13.6% who were 65 years of age or older. The median age was 37 years. For every 100 females, there were 92.4 males. For every 100 females age 18 and over, there were 86.1 males.

The median income for a household in the city was $42,014, and the median income for a family was $51,442. Males had a median income of $41,927 versus $25,720 for females. The per capita income for the city was $20,941. About 5.1% of families and 6.4% of the population were below the poverty line, including 9.5% of those under age 18 and 11.6% of those age 65 or over.

== Education ==
Auburn, within Bay City Public Schools, is home to Bay City Western High School and their principal Judy Cox, Western Middle School, and the Auburn Elementary School.

It is also home to Auburn Area Catholic School. The former Grace Lutheran school has closed and the students attend Lutheran schools outside the city.

== Transportation ==
=== Highways ===
- US 10 courses west to Midland and east to Bay City.

Special Note: The city's eastern overpass on US10 only exits from and to the east. The western overpass has exits to both east and west.

=== Public transit ===
- Bay Metro's Route 4 bus service stops in Auburn at the Auburn Square Shopping Plaza, 963 W Midland Rd. Route 4 connects Auburn with Midland, Delta College, Saginaw Valley State University, and Bay City.
