= Atlanta Hawks all-time roster =

Players of American basketball team in Georgia

The Atlanta Hawks are a National Basketball Association (NBA) team based in Atlanta, Georgia. The team's origins can be traced to the establishment of the Buffalo Bisons in 1946 in Buffalo, New York. The franchise lasted only 38 days in Buffalo when, on December 25, 1946, Leo Ferris, the team's general manager, announced that the team would be moving to Moline, Illinois, which at that time was part of an area then known as the "Tri-Cities": Moline, Rock Island, Illinois, and Davenport, Iowa. Upon relocation to Moline, the team was renamed the Tri-Cities Blackhawks. In 1949, the Blackhawks became one of the NBA's 17 original teams after a merger of the twelve-year-old National Basketball League (NBL) and the three-year-old Basketball Association of America (BAA). In 1950, the franchise relocated to Milwaukee, Wisconsin, and became the Milwaukee Hawks. In 1955 the Hawks moved to St. Louis, Missouri and became the St. Louis Hawks. And in 1965 moved to Atlanta, Georgia which became the Atlanta Hawks.

The following is a list of players, both past and current, who appeared at least in one game for the Atlanta Hawks franchise.

== Players ==
Note: Statistics are correct through the end of the 2025–26 season.

G	Guard	G/F	Guard-forward	F	Forward	F/C	Forward-center	C	Center

legend
^	Denotes player who has been inducted to the Naismith Memorial Basketball Hall of Fame
*	Denotes player who has been selected for at least one All-Star Game with the Atlanta Hawks and is currently on the team roster
^{+}	Denotes player who has been selected for at least one All-Star Game with the Atlanta Hawks
^{x}	Denotes player who is currently on the Atlanta Hawks roster
0.0	Denotes the Atlanta Hawks statistics leader (min. 100 games played for the team for per-game statistics)

=== A to B ===
All-time roster
Player	Pos.	Pre-draft team	Yrs	Seasons	Statistics									Ref.
Player	Pos.	Pre-draft team	Yrs	Seasons	GP	MP	REB	AST	PTS	MPG	RPG	APG	PPG	Ref.
Shareef Abdur-Rahim^{+}	F	California	3	2001–2004	211	8,023	1,868	608	4,309	38.0	8.9	2.9	20.4	
Don Adams	F	Northwestern	2	1971–1973	74	2,106	516	142	841	28.5	7.0	1.9	11.4	
Jaylen Adams	G	St. Bonaventure	1	2018–2019	34	428	60	65	108	12.6	1.8	1.9	3.2	
Nickeil Alexander-Walker^{x}	G	Virginia Tech	1	2025–2026	78	2,603	268	286	1,624	33.4	3.4	3.7	20.8	
Derrick Alston	F	Duquesne	1	1996–1997	2	11	4	0	0	5.5	2.0	0.0	0.0	
Cadillac Anderson	F/C	Houston	2	1994–1995; 1997–1998	101	1,020	306	32	236	10.1	3.0	0.3	2.3	
Justin Anderson	G	Virginia	1	2018–2019	48	463	84	23	178	9.6	1.8	0.5	3.7	
Kenny Anderson	G	Georgia Tech	1	2004–2005	39	717	83	98	195	18.4	2.1	2.5	5.0	
Pero Antić	F/C	(Serbia) Crvena zvezda	2	2013–2015	113	1,962	398	107	708	17.4	3.5	0.9	6.3	
Stacey Arceneaux	F	Iowa State	1	1961–1962	7	110	32	4	50	15.7	4.6	0.6	7.1	
Hilton Armstrong	F/C	UConn	1	2010–2011	12	76	17	4	15	6.3	1.4	0.3	1.3	
Stacey Augmon	G/F	UNLV	5	1991–1996	390	11,878	1,773	892	5,356	30.5	4.5	2.3	13.7	
Gustavo Ayón	C	(Mexico) Halcones de Xalapa	1	2013–2014	26	429	125	28	112	16.5	4.8	1.1	4.3	
Luke Babbitt	F	Nevada	1	2017–2018	37	570	81	26	226	15.4	2.2	0.7	6.1	
John Bagley	G	Boston College	1	1993–1994	3	13	1	3	2	4.3	0.3	1.0	0.7	
Cat Barber	G	NC State	1	2021–2022	3	13	3	3	0	4.3	1.0	1.0	0.0	
John Barber	F	Cal State Los Angeles	1	1956–1957	5	19	6	0	7	3.8	1.2	0.0	1.4	
Tom Barker	F/C	Hawaii	1	1976–1977	59	1,354	401	60	476	22.9	6.8	1.0	8.1	
Dominick Barlow	F	Dumont HS (NJ)	1	2024–2025	35	375	85	19	148	10.7	2.4	0.5	4.2	
John Barnhill	G	Tennessee State	4	1962–1966	223	5,527	698	626	1,936	24.8	3.1	2.8	8.7	
Drew Barry	G	Georgia Tech	2	1997–1998; 1999–2000	35	330	39	65	75	9.4	1.1	1.9	2.1	
Jon Barry	G	Georgia Tech	2	1996–1997; 2004–2005	74	1,240	120	143	368	16.8	1.6	1.9	5.0	
Esteban Batista	F/C	(Spain) Aguas de Calpe	2	2005–2007	70	576	174	11	121	8.2	2.5	0.2	1.7	
John Battle	G	Rutgers	6	1985–1991	416	7,682	633	924	3,882	18.5	1.5	2.2	9.3	
Sergei Bazarevich	G	(Russia) CSKA Moscow	1	1994–1995	10	74	7	14	30	7.4	0.7	1.4	3.0	
Kent Bazemore	G/F	Old Dominion	5	2014–2019	355	8,802	1,341	806	3,678	24.8	3.8	2.3	10.4	
Ed Beach	F	West Virginia	1	1950–1951	1	0	0	1	0	0.0	0.0	1.0	0.0	
Butch Beard	G	Louisville	1	1969–1970	72	941	140	121	501	13.1	1.9	1.7	7.0	
Zelmo Beaty^	C	Prairie View A&M	7	1962–1969	501	17,135	5,622	765	8,727	34.2	11.2	1.5	17.4	
Ernie Beck	G/F	Penn	1	1960–1961	7	62	12	13	19	8.9	1.7	1.9	2.7	
Ron Behagen	F/C	Minnesota	1	1977–1978	26	571	173	34	285	22.0	6.7	1.3	11.0	
Elmer Behnke	C	Bradley	1	1951–1952	4	55	17	4	16	13.8	4.3	1.0	4.0	
Marco Belinelli	G/F	(Italy) Fortitudo Bologna	1	2017–2018	52	1,210	100	103	591	23.3	1.9	2.0	11.4	
Walt Bellamy^	C	Indiana	5	1969–1974	338	12,192	4,123	948	5,289	36.1	12.2	2.8	15.6	
DeAndre' Bembry	F	Saint Joseph's	4	2016–2020	189	3,672	641	360	1,173	19.4	3.4	1.9	6.2	
Irv Bemoras	G/F	Illinois	2	1953–1954; 1956–1957	131	2,479	341	125	827	18.9	2.6	1.0	6.3	
Corey Benjamin	G	Oregon State	1	2002–2003	9	152	31	10	40	16.9	3.4	1.1	4.4	
Gene Berce	G/F	Marquette	1	1949–1950	3	0	0	2	10	0.0	0.0	0.7	3.3	
Saddiq Bey	F	Villanova	2	2022–2024	88	2,691	531	126	1,154	30.6	6.0	1.4	13.1	
Mike Bibby	G	Arizona	4	2007–2011	248	7,709	709	1,119	2,896	31.1	2.9	4.5	11.7	
Charlie Black	F/C	Kansas	1	1951–1952	13	117	31	9	17	9.0	2.4	0.7	1.3	
Mookie Blaylock^{+}	G	Oklahoma	7	1992–1999	518	19,216	2,407	3,764	7,743	37.1	4.6	7.3	14.9	
Bogdan Bogdanović	G	(Serbia) Partizan	5	2020–2025	264	7,660	913	787	3,999	29.0	3.5	3.0	15.1	
Don Boven	G/F	Western Michigan	2	1951–1953	93	2,649	434	212	897	28.5	4.7	2.3	9.6	
Cal Bowdler	F	Old Dominion	3	1999–2002	142	1,383	272	29	424	9.7	1.9	0.2	3.0	
Ira Bowman	G	Penn	1	2000–2001	3	19	2	7	0	6.3	0.7	2.3	0.0	
Donnie Boyce	G	Colorado	2	1995–1997	30	195	25	16	79	6.5	0.8	0.5	2.6	
Harry Boykoff	C	St. John's	1	1950–1951	16	0	85	20	125	0.0	5.3	1.3	7.8	
Cedric Bozeman	G	UCLA	1	2006–2007	23	199	23	9	26	8.7	1.0	0.4	1.1	
Steve Bracey	G	Tulsa	2	1972–1974	145	2,513	253	356	1,008	17.3	1.7	2.5	7.0	
Dudley Bradley	G/F	North Carolina	1	1988–1989	38	267	32	24	72	7.0	0.8	0.6	1.9	
Michael Bradley	F/C	Villanova	1	2003–2004	11	60	12	0	12	5.5	1.1	0.0	1.1	
Tony Bradley^{x}	C	North Carolina	1	2025–2026	3	34	9	2	11	11.3	3.0	0.7	3.7	
Elton Brand	F	Duke	2	2013–2015	109	1,900	461	96	515	17.4	4.2	0.9	4.7	
Jim Brasco	G	NYU	1	1952–1953	10	137	9	9	44	13.7	0.9	0.9	4.4	
Randy Breuer	C	Minnesota	1	1992–1993	12	107	28	6	32	8.9	2.3	0.5	2.7	
Frank Brian^{+}	G	LSU	1	1950–1951	68	0	244	266	1,144	0.0	3.6	3.9	16.8	
Bill Bridges^{+}	F/C	Kansas	10	1962–1972	683	23,574	8,656	1,997	8,685	34.5	12.7	2.9	12.7	
Charlie Brown Jr.	G	Saint Joseph's	1	2019–2020	10	40	4	2	20	4.0	0.4	0.2	2.0	
Chaundee Brown Jr.	G/F	Michigan	1	2021–2022	3	83	14	4	29	27.7	4.7	1.3	9.7	
Chucky Brown	F	NC State	1	1997–1998	77	1,202	183	55	387	15.6	2.4	0.7	5.0	
John Brown	F	Missouri	6	1973–1978; 1979–1980	405	8,819	1,879	595	3,222	21.8	4.6	1.5	8.0	
Rickey Brown	F/C	Mississippi State	3	1982–1985	163	1,904	492	63	554	11.7	3.0	0.4	3.4	
Nicolás Brussino	G/F	(Argentina) Regatas Corrientes	1	2017–2018	4	10	3	0	0	2.5	0.8	0.0	0.0	
Kobe Bufkin	G	Michigan	2	2023–2025	27	320	54	44	134	11.9	2.0	1.6	5.0	
Matt Bullard	F	Iowa	1	1995–1996	46	460	60	18	174	10.0	1.3	0.4	3.8	
Tommy Burleson	C	NC State	1	1980–1981	31	363	94	12	102	11.7	3.0	0.4	3.3	
Art Burris	F	Tennessee	1	1951–1952	12	269	50	16	67	22.4	4.2	1.3	5.6	
Ed Burton	F	Michigan State	1	1964–1965	7	42	13	2	18	6.0	1.9	0.3	2.6	
Willie Burton	G/F	Minnesota	1	1996–1997	24	380	41	11	148	15.8	1.7	0.5	6.2	
Tommy Byrnes	G/F	Seton Hall	1	1950–1951	19	0	33	32	87	0.0	1.7	1.7	4.6	

=== C ===
All-time roster
Player	Pos.	Pre-draft team	Yrs	Seasons	Statistics									Ref.
Player	Pos.	Pre-draft team	Yrs	Seasons	GP	MP	REB	AST	PTS	MPG	RPG	APG	PPG	Ref.
Barney Cable	F	Bradley	2	1961–1963	94	2,025	609	126	777	21.5	6.5	1.3	8.3	
José Calderón	G	(Spain) Saski Baskonia	1	2016–2017	17	247	32	37	61	14.5	1.9	2.2	3.6	
Joe Caldwell^{+}	G/F	Arizona State	5	1965–1970	369	11,615	1,736	1,074	6,072	31.5	4.7	2.9	16.5	
Bill Calhoun	G/F	CC San Francisco	3	1952–1955	190	6,388	814	565	1,555	33.6	4.3	3.0	8.2	
Clint Capela	C	(France) Élan Chalon	5	2020–2025	330	8,729	3,742	352	3,879	26.5	11.3	1.1	11.8	
Bob Carpenter	F/C	East Texas State	1	1950–1951	35	0	167	63	222	0.0	4.8	1.8	6.3	
Antoine Carr	F/C	Wichita State	6	1984–1990	346	5,922	1,152	375	2,579	17.1	3.3	1.1	7.5	
DeMarre Carroll	F	Missouri	2	2013–2015	143	4,530	775	252	1,693	31.7	5.4	1.8	11.8	
Vince Carter^	G/F	North Carolina	2	2018–2020	136	2,206	318	135	860	16.2	2.3	1.0	6.3	
Tyler Cavanaugh	F	George Washington	1	2017–2018	39	518	127	27	183	13.3	3.3	0.7	4.7	
Jerry Chambers	F	Utah	1	1970–1971	65	1,168	245	61	580	18.0	3.8	0.9	8.9	
John Chaney	F/C	LSU	1	1949–1950	6	0	0	15	28	0.0	0.0	2.5	4.7	
Len Chappell	F/C	Wake Forest	1	1970–1971	42	451	133	16	202	10.7	3.2	0.4	4.8	
Ken Charles	G	Fordham	2	1976–1978	103	3,007	192	377	1,101	29.2	1.9	3.7	10.7	
Lorenzo Charles	F	NC State	1	1985–1986	36	273	39	8	122	7.6	1.1	0.2	3.4	
Maurice Cheeks^	G	West Texas A&M	1	1991–1992	56	1,086	95	185	259	19.4	1.7	3.3	4.6	
Josh Childress	G/F	Stanford	4	2004–2008	285	8,923	1,582	526	3,162	31.3	5.6	1.8	11.1	
Cal Christensen	F/C	Toledo	2	1950–1952	91	374	605	195	531	4.1	6.6	2.1	5.8	
Bob Christian	C	Grambling State	3	1970–1973	165	1,768	663	105	556	10.7	4.0	0.6	3.4	
Speedy Claxton	G	Hofstra	2	2006–2007; 2008–2009	44	1,069	81	188	226	24.3	1.8	4.3	5.1	
Antonius Cleveland	G	Southeast Missouri State	1	2017–2018	4	42	4	0	13	10.5	1.0	0.0	3.3	
Jack Coleman	F/C	Louisville	3	1955–1958	185	5,020	1,474	423	1,779	27.1	8.0	2.3	9.6	
Bimbo Coles	G	Virginia Tech	1	1999–2000	80	1,924	172	290	645	24.1	2.2	3.6	8.1	
Jason Collier	C	Georgia Tech	2	2003–2005	90	1,487	295	35	628	16.5	3.3	0.4	7.0	
Art Collins	G	St. Thomas	1	1980–1981	29	395	41	25	94	13.6	1.4	0.9	3.2	
Don Collins	G/F	Washington State	1	1980–1981	47	1,184	187	115	597	25.2	4.0	2.4	12.7	
Jason Collins	C	Stanford	3	2009–2012	103	1,016	164	36	151	9.9	1.6	0.3	1.5	
John Collins	F	Wake Forest	6	2017–2023	364	10,618	2,903	540	5,768	29.2	8.0	1.5	15.8	
Sean Colson	G	Charlotte	1	2000–2001	3	14	3	3	0	4.7	1.0	1.0	0.0	
Chuck Cooper^	F	Duquesne	2	1954–1956	105	2,323	523	212	751	22.1	5.0	2.0	7.2	
Sharife Cooper	G	Auburn	1	2021–2022	13	39	5	5	7	3.0	0.4	0.4	0.5	
Tyrone Corbin	G/F	DePaul	4	1994–1995; 1996–1999	277	7,459	1,063	407	2,326	26.9	3.8	1.5	8.4	
Ray Corley	G	Georgetown	1	1950–1951	18	0	43	38	74	0.0	2.4	2.1	4.1	
Allen Crabbe	G	California	1	2019–2020	28	522	65	28	143	18.6	2.3	1.0	5.1	
Chris Crawford	F	Marquette	7	1997–2004	252	3,985	547	154	1,654	15.8	2.2	0.6	6.6	
Jamal Crawford	G	Michigan	2	2009–2011	155	4,757	331	479	2,502	30.7	2.1	3.1	16.1	
Jordan Crawford	G	Xavier	1	2010–2011	16	160	28	15	67	10.0	1.8	0.9	4.2	
Jim Creighton	F	Colorado	1	1975–1976	32	172	45	4	31	5.4	1.4	0.1	1.0	
Charlie Criss	G	New Mexico State	7	1977–1982; 1983–1985	318	7,091	460	1,079	2,732	22.3	1.4	3.4	8.6	
Dillard Crocker	G/F	Western Michigan	2	1951–1953	93	1,536	212	120	614	16.5	2.3	1.3	6.6	
Jarrett Culver	G/F	Texas Tech	1	2022–2023	10	137	38	6	44	13.7	3.8	0.6	4.4	
Jared Cunningham	G	Oregon State	1	2013–2014	5	22	1	3	2	4.4	0.2	0.6	0.4	

=== D ===
All-time roster
Player	Pos.	Pre-draft team	Yrs	Seasons	Statistics									Ref.
Player	Pos.	Pre-draft team	Yrs	Seasons	GP	MP	REB	AST	PTS	MPG	RPG	APG	PPG	Ref.
Erick Dampier	C	Mississippi State	1	2011–2012	15	83	25	4	2	5.5	1.7	0.3	0.1	
Dyson Daniels^{x}	G	NBA G League Ignite	2	2024–2026	152	5,091	969	782	1,974	33.5	6.4	5.1	13.0	
N'Faly Dante	C	Oregon	1	2025–2026	4	15	7	0	3	3.8	1.8	0.0	0.8	
Pete Darcey	C	Oklahoma State	1	1952–1953	12	90	10	2	11	7.5	0.8	0.2	0.9	
Jimmy Darrow	G	Bowling Green	1	1961–1962	5	34	7	6	12	6.8	1.4	1.2	2.4	
Deyonta Davis	F/C	Michigan State	1	2018–2019	9	118	36	5	36	13.1	4.0	0.6	4.0	
Emanual Davis	G	Delaware State	2	2001–2003	52	1,114	117	104	273	21.4	2.3	2.0	5.3	
Jim Davis	F/C	Colorado	5	1967–1972	303	6,367	2,030	464	2,650	21.0	6.7	1.5	8.7	
Johnny Davis	G	Dayton	3	1982–1984; 1985–1986	155	3,946	286	753	1,754	25.5	1.8	4.9	11.3	
Josh Davis	F	Wyoming	1	2003–2004	4	23	5	0	5	5.8	1.3	0.0	1.3	
Ron Davis	G/F	Washington State	1	1976–1977	7	67	7	2	20	9.6	1.0	0.3	2.9	
Walt Davis	F/C	Texas A&M	1	1957–1958	26	287	86	11	127	11.0	3.3	0.4	4.9	
Austin Daye	F	Gonzaga	1	2014–2015	8	76	14	8	26	9.5	1.8	1.0	3.3	
Dewayne Dedmon	C	USC	3	2017–2020	136	3,384	1,051	187	1,391	24.9	7.7	1.4	10.2	
Archie Dees	F/C	Indiana	1	1961–1962	8	0	0	0	0	0.0	0.0	0.0	0.0	
Malcolm Delaney	G	Virginia Tech	2	2016–2018	127	2,262	223	356	729	17.8	1.8	2.8	5.7	
Tony Delk	G	Kentucky	2	2004–2006	57	1,347	132	104	669	23.6	2.3	1.8	11.7	
Nate DeLong	C	Wisconsin-River Falls	1	1951–1952	17	132	31	14	64	7.8	1.8	0.8	3.8	
RayJ Dennis^{x}	G	Baylor	1	2025–2026	3	34	3	7	10	11.3	1.0	2.3	3.3	
Randy Denton	C	Duke	1	1976–1977	45	700	218	33	239	15.6	4.8	0.7	5.3	
Hank DeZonie	F/C	Clark Atlanta	1	1950–1951	5	0	18	9	17	0.0	3.6	1.8	3.4	
Boris Diaw	F/C	(France) Élan Béarnais	2	2003–2005	142	3,120	512	331	656	22.0	3.6	2.3	4.6	
Dan Dickau	G	Gonzaga	2	2002–2004	73	658	59	103	232	9.0	0.8	1.4	3.2	
Henry Dickerson	G	Charleston	1	1976–1977	6	63	2	11	17	10.5	0.3	1.8	2.8	
Gorgui Dieng	C	Louisville	1	2021–2022	44	371	121	34	154	8.4	2.8	0.8	3.5	
Fred Diute	G	St. Bonaventure	1	1954–1955	7	72	13	4	11	10.3	1.9	0.6	1.6	
Tyler Dorsey	G	Oregon	2	2017–2019	83	1,225	173	96	495	14.8	2.1	1.2	6.0	
John Drew^{+}	G/F	Gardner–Webb	8	1974–1982	595	18,362	4,433	957	12,621	30.9	7.5	1.6	21.2	
Predrag Drobnjak	C	(Serbia) Partizan	1	2004–2005	71	1,435	238	49	597	20.2	3.4	0.7	8.4	
Bob Duffy	G	Colgate	2	1962–1964	44	441	40	83	156	10.0	0.9	1.9	3.5	
Mike Dunleavy Jr.	G/F	Duke	1	2016–2017	30	475	68	30	169	15.8	2.3	1.0	5.6	
Kris Dunn	G	Providence	1	2020–2021	4	45	6	2	5	11.3	1.5	0.5	1.3	
Dennis DuVal	G	Syracuse	1	1975–1976	13	130	8	20	36	10.0	0.6	1.5	2.8	
Gene Dyker	F	DePaul	1	1953–1954	11	91	16	5	16	8.3	1.5	0.5	1.5	

=== E to F ===
All-time roster
Player	Pos.	Pre-draft team	Yrs	Seasons	Statistics									Ref.
Player	Pos.	Pre-draft team	Yrs	Seasons	GP	MP	REB	AST	PTS	MPG	RPG	APG	PPG	Ref.
Jerry Eaves	G	Louisville	1	1984–1985	3	37	0	4	11	12.3	0.0	1.3	3.7	
Dwight Eddleman^{+}	G/F	Illinois	3	1949–1952	182	1,616	642	424	2,505	8.9	3.5	2.3	13.8	
Keith Edmonson	G	Purdue	1	1982–1983	32	309	39	22	112	9.7	1.2	0.7	3.5	
Doug Edwards	F	Florida State	2	1993–1995	54	319	66	21	110	5.9	1.2	0.4	2.0	
John Edwards	C	Kent State	1	2005–2006	40	296	48	5	70	7.4	1.2	0.1	1.8	
Craig Ehlo	G/F	Washington State	3	1993–1996	210	5,071	682	524	1,967	24.1	3.2	2.5	9.4	
Rich Eichhorst	G	Southeast Missouri State	1	1961–1962	1	10	1	3	2	10.0	1.0	3.0	2.0	
Obinna Ekezie	F/C	Maryland	1	2004–2005	42	732	179	11	230	17.4	4.3	0.3	5.5	
LaPhonso Ellis	F	Notre Dame	2	1998–2000	78	1,848	399	77	691	23.7	5.1	1.0	8.9	
Gene Englund	F/C	Wisconsin	1	1949–1950	22	0	0	24	164	0.0	0.0	1.1	7.5	
Jeremy Evans	F	Western Kentucky	1	2017–2018	1	5	1	0	2	5.0	1.0	0.0	2.0	
Maurice Evans	G	Texas	3	2008–2011	206	3,994	481	132	1,237	19.4	2.3	0.6	6.0	
Mike Farmer	F	San Francisco	4	1962–1966	225	4,436	870	346	1,458	19.7	3.9	1.5	6.5	
George Feigenbaum	G	Kentucky	1	1952–1953	5	79	7	9	16	15.8	1.4	1.8	3.2	
Bruno Fernando	C	Maryland	4	2019–2021; 2022–2024	142	1,662	484	106	600	11.7	3.4	0.7	4.2	
Al Ferrari	G/F	Michigan State	5	1955–1956; 1958–1962	353	7,444	818	929	2,487	21.1	2.3	2.6	7.0	
Duane Ferrell	G/F	Georgia Tech	6	1988–1994	353	5,914	757	356	2,778	16.8	2.1	1.0	7.9	
Bob Ferry	F/C	Saint Louis	1	1959–1960	62	875	233	40	364	14.1	3.8	0.6	5.9	
Trent Forrest	G	Florida State	2	2022–2024	61	691	88	130	135	11.3	1.4	2.1	2.2	
Greg Foster	F/C	UTEP	1	1992–1993	33	205	56	10	101	6.2	1.7	0.3	3.1	
Larry Foust	F/C	La Salle	3	1959–1962	150	2,361	717	155	1,105	15.7	4.8	1.0	7.4	
Jerry Fowler	C	Missouri	1	1951–1952	6	41	10	2	9	6.8	1.7	0.3	1.5	
Matt Freije	F	Vanderbilt	1	2006–2007	19	147	24	7	40	7.7	1.3	0.4	2.1	
Hiram Fuller	F	Fresno State	1	2003–2004	4	43	11	2	8	10.8	2.8	0.5	2.0	
Terry Furlow	G/F	Michigan State	2	1978–1980	50	980	113	153	463	19.6	2.3	3.1	9.3	

=== G ===
All-time roster
Player	Pos.	Pre-draft team	Yrs	Seasons	Statistics									Ref.
Player	Pos.	Pre-draft team	Yrs	Seasons	GP	MP	REB	AST	PTS	MPG	RPG	APG	PPG	Ref.
Danilo Gallinari	F	(Italy) Olimpia Milano	2	2020–2022	117	2,894	519	177	1,447	24.7	4.4	1.5	12.4	
Dave Gambee	F	Oregon State	2	1958–1960	44	7	2	0	2	0.2	0.0	0.0	0.0	
Thomas Gardner	G	Missouri	1	2008–2009	16	98	7	2	24	6.1	0.4	0.1	1.5	
Ed Gayda	G/F	Washington State	1	1950–1951	15	0	39	13	56	0.0	2.6	0.9	3.7	
Dee Gibson	G/F	Western Kentucky	1	1949–1950	44	0	0	126	281	0.0	0.0	2.9	6.4	
Keshon Gilbert^{x}	G	Iowa State	1	2025–2026	1	26	9	1	11	26.0	9.0	1.0	11.0	
Herm Gilliam	G/F	Purdue	4	1971–1975	280	8,474	1,205	1,384	3,496	30.3	4.3	4.9	12.5	
Jack Givens	G/F	Kentucky	2	1978–1980	156	2,601	456	142	1,040	16.7	2.9	0.9	6.7	
Mike Glenn	G	Southern Illinois	4	1981–1985	263	4,586	336	505	2,109	17.4	1.3	1.9	8.0	
Dion Glover	G	Georgia Tech	5	1999–2004	273	5,886	857	436	2,318	21.6	3.1	1.6	8.5	
Brandon Goodwin	G	Florida Gulf Coast	2	2019–2021	81	1,050	141	146	434	13.0	1.7	1.8	5.4	
Joe Graboski	F/C	Roberto Clemente HS (IL)	1	1961–1962	3	0	0	0	0	0.0	0.0	0.0	0.0	
Ricky Grace	G	Oklahoma	1	1993–1994	3	8	1	1	4	2.7	0.3	0.3	1.3	
Paul Graham	G/F	Ohio	3	1991–1994	179	3,354	433	352	1,499	18.7	2.4	2.0	8.4	
Treveon Graham	G	VCU	1	2019–2020	22	266	50	15	72	12.1	2.3	0.7	3.3	
Ronnie Grandison	F	New Orleans	1	1995–1996	4	19	6	1	4	4.8	1.5	0.3	1.0	
Stewart Granger	G	Villanova	1	1984–1985	9	92	6	12	16	10.2	0.7	1.3	1.8	
Ed Gray	G	California	2	1997–1999	60	809	73	46	373	13.5	1.2	0.8	6.2	
Sihugo Green	G/F	Duquesne	4	1958–1962	186	3,765	749	419	1,275	20.2	4.0	2.3	6.9	
Willie Green	G	Detroit Mercy	1	2011–2012	53	922	80	40	404	17.4	1.5	0.8	7.6	
Gary Gregor	F/C	South Carolina	1	1969–1970	81	1,603	397	63	660	19.8	4.9	0.8	8.1	
AJ Griffin	F	Duke	2	2022–2024	92	1,572	171	78	687	17.1	1.9	0.8	7.5	
Anthony Grundy	G	NC State	1	2005–2006	12	108	17	9	52	9.0	1.4	0.8	4.3	
Richie Guerin^	G	Iona	6	1963–1967; 1968–1970	330	9,192	969	1,486	4,284	27.9	2.9	4.5	13.0	
Mouhamed Gueye^{x}	F	Washington State	3	2023–2026	116	1,785	436	100	563	15.4	3.8	0.9	4.9	
Tom Gugliotta	F	NC State	1	2004–2005	27	748	148	56	213	27.7	5.5	2.1	7.9	

=== H ===
All-time roster
Player	Pos.	Pre-draft team	Yrs	Seasons	Statistics									Ref.
Player	Pos.	Pre-draft team	Yrs	Seasons	GP	MP	REB	AST	PTS	MPG	RPG	APG	PPG	Ref.
Cliff Hagan^	G/F	Kentucky	10	1956–1966	745	21,731	5,116	2,242	13,447	29.2	6.9	3.0	18.0	
Shaler Halimon	G/F	Utah State	1	1971–1972	1	4	0	0	0	4.0	0.0	0.0	0.0	
Jeff Halliburton	G	Drake	2	1971–1973	61	526	63	48	268	8.6	1.0	0.8	4.4	
Darvin Ham	F	Texas Tech	1	2002–2003	75	926	153	38	180	12.3	2.0	0.5	2.4	
Daniel Hamilton	G/F	UConn	1	2018–2019	19	204	47	22	57	10.7	2.5	1.2	3.0	
Dennis Hamilton	F	Arizona State	1	1968–1969	25	141	29	8	76	5.6	1.2	0.3	3.0	
Darrin Hancock	G/F	Kansas	1	1996–1997	14	86	13	7	34	6.1	0.9	0.5	2.4	
Alex Hannum^	F/C	USC	3	1954–1957	124	2,568	589	262	698	20.7	4.8	2.1	5.6	
Travis Hansen	G	BYU	1	2003–2004	41	507	70	19	123	12.4	1.7	0.5	3.0	
Tim Hardaway Jr.	G	Michigan	2	2015–2017	130	3,018	310	233	1,469	23.2	2.4	1.8	11.3	
John Hargis	G/F	Texas	1	1950–1951	15	0	36	16	56	0.0	2.4	1.1	3.7	
Skip Harlicka	G	South Carolina	1	1968–1969	26	218	16	37	106	8.4	0.6	1.4	4.1	
Al Harrington	F	St. Patrick HS (NJ)	2	2004–2006	142	5,332	984	446	2,569	37.5	6.9	3.1	18.1	
Chris Harris	G	Dayton	1	1955–1956	15	168	18	18	41	11.2	1.2	1.2	2.7	
Devin Harris	G	Wisconsin	1	2012–2013	58	1,421	116	197	577	24.5	2.0	3.4	9.9	
Bob Harrison^{+}	G	Michigan	4	1953–1957	168	5,343	493	612	1,568	31.8	2.9	3.6	9.3	
Antonio Harvey	F/C	Pfeiffer	1	2002–2003	4	32	6	0	4	8.0	1.5	0.0	1.0	
Billy Hassett	G	Notre Dame	1	1949–1950	18	0	0	68	161	0.0	0.0	3.8	8.9	
Scott Hastings	F/C	Arkansas	6	1982–1988	299	3,311	730	149	934	11.1	2.4	0.5	3.1	
Vernon Hatton	G	Kentucky	1	1961–1962	25	0	0	0	0	0.0	0.0	0.0	0.0	
Steve Hawes	F/C	Washington	7	1976–1983	451	11,814	3,147	950	4,498	26.2	7.0	2.1	10.0	
Connie Hawkins^	F/C	Iowa	1	1975–1976	74	1,907	445	212	610	25.8	6.0	2.9	8.2	
Walt Hazzard	G	UCLA	3	1968–1971	244	8,054	895	1,549	3,500	33.0	3.7	6.3	14.3	
Alan Henderson	F	Indiana	9	1995–2004	485	11,628	2,657	356	4,575	24.0	5.5	0.7	9.4	
Cedric Henderson	F	Georgia	1	1986–1987	6	10	3	0	5	1.7	0.5	0.0	0.8	
Tom Henderson	G	Hawaii	3	1974–1977	206	6,599	601	1,074	2,574	32.0	2.9	5.2	12.5	
Bill Henry	C	Rice	1	1949–1950	19	0	0	9	82	0.0	0.0	0.5	4.3	
Steve Henson	G	Kansas State	1	1992–1993	53	719	55	155	213	13.6	1.0	2.9	4.0	
Kleggie Hermsen	F/C	Minnesota	1	1950–1951	48	0	0	72	384	0.0	0.0	1.5	8.0	
Keith Herron	G/F	Villanova	1	1978–1979	14	81	10	3	40	5.8	0.7	0.2	2.9	
Buddy Hield^{x}	G	Oklahoma	1	2025–2026	7	51	8	5	36	7.3	1.1	0.7	5.1	
Armond Hill	G	Princeton	6	1976–1982; 1983–1984	363	9,779	737	1,887	2,768	26.9	2.0	5.2	7.6	
Cleo Hill	G	Winston-Salem State	1	1961–1962	58	1,050	178	114	320	18.1	3.1	2.0	5.5	
Malcolm Hill	G/F	Illinois	1	2021–2022	3	46	6	1	17	15.3	2.0	0.3	5.7	
Solomon Hill	F	Arizona	2	2020–2022	84	1,652	237	87	325	19.7	2.8	1.0	3.9	
Kirk Hinrich	G	Kansas	3	2010–2012; 2015–2016	83	1,999	166	224	527	24.1	2.0	2.7	6.3	
Lew Hitch	F/C	Kansas State	2	1953–1955	72	2,452	691	141	575	34.1	9.6	2.0	8.0	
Aaron Holiday	G	UCLA	1	2022–2023	63	845	74	89	247	13.4	1.2	1.4	3.9	
Justin Holiday	F	Washington	2	2015–2016; 2022–2023	54	674	50	36	189	12.5	0.9	0.7	3.5	
Wilbur Holland	G	New Orleans	1	1975–1976	33	351	41	26	192	10.6	1.2	0.8	5.8	
Red Holzman^	G	CCNY	1	1953–1954	51	649	46	75	196	12.7	0.9	1.5	3.8	
Tom Hoover	C	Villanova	1	1966–1967	17	129	36	8	31	7.6	2.1	0.5	1.8	
Al Horford^{+}	F/C	Florida	9	2007–2016	578	19,342	5,144	1,589	8,288	33.5	8.9	2.7	14.3	
Ron Horn	F	Indiana	1	1961–1962	3	25	6	1	3	8.3	2.0	0.3	1.0	
Bob Houbregs^	F/C	Washington	1	1953–1954	11	166	46	9	64	15.1	4.2	0.8	5.8	
Caleb Houstan^{x}	F	Michigan	1	2025–2026	18	75	11	4	42	4.2	0.6	0.2	2.3	
Tom Hovasse	F	Penn State	1	1994–1995	2	4	0	0	0	2.0	0.0	0.0	0.0	
Dwight Howard^	C	SACA (GA)	1	2016–2017	74	2,199	940	104	1,002	29.7	12.7	1.4	13.5	
Lou Hudson (#23)^	G/F	Minnesota	11	1966–1977	730	25,825	3,598	2,098	16,049	35.4	4.9	2.9	22.0	
Kevin Huerter	G	Maryland	4	2018–2022	274	8,122	958	871	3,125	29.6	3.5	3.2	11.4	
Isaac Humphries	C	Kentucky	1	2018–2019	5	56	11	0	15	11.2	2.2	0.0	3.0	
Kris Humphries	F/C	Minnesota	2	2015–2017	77	984	277	42	391	12.8	3.6	0.5	5.1	
De'Andre Hunter	F	Virginia	6	2019–2025	300	9,144	1,223	462	4,453	30.5	4.1	1.5	14.8	
Othello Hunter	F	Ohio State	2	2008–2010	23	125	36	1	33	5.4	1.6	0.0	1.4	
Mel Hutchins^{+}	F/C	BYU	2	1951–1953	137	5,509	1,673	417	1,438	40.2	12.2	3.0	10.5	

=== I to J ===
All-time roster
Player	Pos.	Pre-draft team	Yrs	Seasons	Statistics									Ref.
Player	Pos.	Pre-draft team	Yrs	Seasons	GP	MP	REB	AST	PTS	MPG	RPG	APG	PPG	Ref.
Ersan İlyasova	F	(Turkey) Ülkerspor	2	2016–2018	72	1,808	402	94	771	25.1	5.6	1.3	10.7	
Tom Ingelsby	G	Villanova	1	1973–1974	48	398	44	37	129	8.3	0.9	0.8	2.7	
Royal Ivey	G	Texas	3	2004–2007	188	2,326	231	222	637	12.4	1.2	1.2	3.4	
Wes Iwundu	F	Kansas State	1	2021–2022	3	82	13	0	22	27.3	4.3	0.0	7.3	
Jermaine Jackson	G	Detroit Mercy	1	2002–2003	29	273	32	35	55	9.4	1.1	1.2	1.9	
Jim Jackson	G	Ohio State	2	1999–2001	96	3,317	473	280	1,560	34.6	4.9	2.9	16.3	
Stephen Jackson	G/F	Butler CC	1	2003–2004	80	2,940	370	244	1,450	36.8	4.6	3.1	18.1	
Henry James	F	St. Mary's (TX)	1	1996–1997	53	945	81	21	356	17.8	1.5	0.4	6.7	
John Jenkins	G	Vanderbilt	3	2012–2015	98	1,357	155	80	549	13.8	1.6	0.8	5.6	
Anthony Johnson	G	College of Charleston	5	1998–2001; 2006–2008	181	3,447	288	525	886	19.0	1.6	2.9	4.9	
B. J. Johnson	G	La Salle	1	2018–2019	6	43	8	0	21	7.2	1.3	0.0	3.5	
DerMarr Johnson	F	Cincinnati	2	2000–2002	150	3,040	425	145	999	20.3	2.8	1.0	6.7	
Eddie Johnson	G	Auburn	9	1977–1986	619	18,852	1,430	3,207	9,631	30.5	2.3	5.2	15.6	
George Johnson	F/C	Dillard	1	1982–1983	37	461	117	17	64	12.5	3.2	0.5	1.7	
Ivan Johnson	F	Cal State San Bernardino	2	2011–2013	125	1,969	492	78	808	15.8	3.9	0.6	6.5	
Jalen Johnson*	F	Duke	5	2021–2026	256	6,867	1,895	1,036	3,644	26.8	7.4	4.0	14.2	
Joe Johnson^{+}	G/F	Arkansas	7	2005–2012	508	19,733	2,152	2,653	10,606	38.8	4.2	5.2	20.9	
Ollie Johnson	F	Temple	1	1977–1978	82	1,704	260	120	695	20.8	3.2	1.5	8.5	
Dahntay Jones	G/F	Duke	1	2012–2013	28	381	31	20	88	13.6	1.1	0.7	3.1	
Damian Jones	C	Vanderbilt	1	2019–2020	55	887	206	35	306	16.1	3.7	0.6	5.6	
Dwight Jones	F/C	Houston	3	1973–1976	215	5,296	1,675	321	2,035	24.6	7.8	1.5	9.5	
Solomon Jones	F	South Florida	3	2006–2009	156	1,486	320	26	412	9.5	2.1	0.2	2.6	
Reggie Jordan	G	New Mexico State	1	1995–1996	24	247	52	29	94	10.3	2.2	1.2	3.9	
Phil Jordon	F/C	Whitworth	1	1962–1963	73	1,420	319	103	478	19.5	4.4	1.4	6.5	
Noble Jorgensen	C	Iowa	1	1950–1951	22	0	112	27	246	0.0	5.1	1.2	11.2	

=== K to L ===
All-time roster
Player	Pos.	Pre-draft team	Yrs	Seasons	Statistics									Ref.
Player	Pos.	Pre-draft team	Yrs	Seasons	GP	MP	REB	AST	PTS	MPG	RPG	APG	PPG	Ref.
Frank Kaminsky	C	Wisconsin	1	2022–2023	26	176	36	21	71	6.8	1.4	0.8	2.7	
Bob Kauffman	F/C	Guilford	1	1974–1975	73	797	182	81	285	10.9	2.5	1.1	3.9	
Adam Keefe	F	Stanford	2	1992–1994	145	2,312	633	114	815	15.9	4.4	0.8	5.6	
Ryan Kelly	F	Duke	1	2016–2017	16	110	18	8	25	6.9	1.1	0.5	1.6	
Tim Kempton	F/C	Notre Dame	1	1995–1996	3	11	2	1	0	3.7	0.7	0.3	0.0	
Luke Kennard	G	Duke	1	2025–2026	46	944	99	96	364	20.5	2.2	2.1	7.9	
Jack Kerris	F/C	Loyola (IL)	1	1949–1950	4	0	0	8	26	0.0	0.0	2.0	6.5	
Walt Kirk	G/F	Illinois	2	1949–1950; 1951–1952	43	396	44	88	341	9.2	1.0	2.0	7.9	
Corey Kispert^{x}	F	Gonzaga	1	2025–2026	39	710	88	60	358	18.2	2.3	1.5	9.2	
Brevin Knight	G	Stanford	1	2000–2001	47	1,364	161	286	324	29.0	3.4	6.1	6.9	
Nathan Knight	F	William & Mary	1	2020–2021	33	279	72	8	124	8.5	2.2	0.2	3.8	
Kevin Knox	F	Kentucky	1	2021–2022	17	111	22	7	46	6.5	1.3	0.4	2.7	
Christian Koloko^{x}	C	Arizona	1	2025–2026	14	156	36	8	44	11.1	2.6	0.6	3.1	
Jon Koncak	F/C	SMU	10	1985–1995	717	15,121	3,584	734	3,317	21.1	5.0	1.0	4.6	
Kyle Korver^{+}	G/F	Creighton	5	2012–2017	332	10,380	1,228	789	3,615	31.3	3.7	2.4	10.9	
Vít Krejčí	G	(Spain) Basket Zaragoza	4	2022–2026	154	2,887	331	282	997	18.7	2.1	1.8	6.5	
Tommy Kron	G	Kentucky	1	1966–1967	32	221	36	46	67	6.9	1.1	1.4	2.1	
Toni Kukoč^	F	(Italy) Benetton Treviso	2	2000–2002	76	2,112	315	316	919	27.8	4.1	4.2	12.1	
Jonathan Kuminga^{x}	F	G League Ignite	1	2025–2026	16	354	85	33	196	22.1	5.3	2.1	12.3	
Fred LaCour	G/F	San Francisco	2	1960–1962	128	2,229	450	250	875	17.4	3.5	2.0	6.8	
Christian Laettner^{+}	F/C	Duke	3	1995–1998	186	6,399	1,443	481	2,931	34.4	7.8	2.6	15.8	
Jock Landale^{x}	C	Saint Mary's	1	2025–2026	23	446	95	40	209	19.4	4.1	1.7	9.1	
Mark Landsberger	F/C	Arizona State	1	1983–1984	35	335	119	10	53	9.6	3.4	0.3	1.5	
Andrew Lang	C	Arkansas	3	1993–1996	215	5,763	1,103	185	1,955	26.8	5.1	0.9	9.1	
Priest Lauderdale	C	Central State	1	1996–1997	35	180	43	12	111	5.1	1.2	0.3	3.2	
Bob Lavoy	F/C	Western Kentucky	1	1953–1954	8	125	30	10	41	15.6	3.8	1.3	5.1	
Acie Law	G	Texas A&M	2	2007–2009	111	1,425	115	199	397	12.8	1.0	1.8	3.6	
Butch Lee	G	Marquette	1	1978–1979	49	997	59	169	376	20.3	1.2	3.4	7.7	
Clyde Lee	F/C	Vanderbilt	1	1974–1975	9	177	70	8	56	19.7	7.8	0.9	6.2	
Damion Lee	G	Louisville	1	2017–2018	15	404	71	29	161	26.9	4.7	1.9	10.7	
Ron Lee	G	Oregon	1	1979–1980	30	364	33	67	67	12.1	1.1	2.2	2.2	
George Lehmann	G	Campbell	2	1967–1969	66	635	53	120	213	9.6	0.8	1.8	3.2	
Alex Len	C	Maryland	2	2018–2020	117	2,289	654	128	1,203	19.6	5.6	1.1	10.3	
Gary Leonard	C	Missouri	2	1990–1992	9	22	7	1	12	2.4	0.8	0.1	1.3	
Jim Les	G	Bradley	1	1994–1995	24	188	26	44	50	7.8	1.1	1.8	2.1	
Andrew Levane	G/F	St. John's	1	1952–1953	7	68	9	9	8	9.7	1.3	1.3	1.1	
Caris LeVert	G	Michigan	1	2024–2025	26	692	96	75	388	26.6	3.7	2.9	14.9	
Cliff Levingston	F	Wichita State	6	1984–1990	474	11,835	2,954	442	4,205	25.0	6.2	0.9	8.9	
Jeremy Lin	G	Harvard	1	2018–2019	51	1,003	119	181	546	19.7	2.3	3.5	10.7	
Randy Livingston	G	LSU	1	1997–1998	12	82	6	5	10	6.8	0.5	0.4	0.8	
Don Lofgran	F/C	San Francisco	1	1953–1954	21	380	64	26	102	18.1	3.0	1.2	4.9	
Johnny Logan	G	Indiana	1	1950–1951	30	0	134	119	231	0.0	4.5	4.0	7.7	
Grant Long	F	Eastern Michigan	3	1994–1996; 1998–1999	211	6,967	1,679	363	2,490	33.0	8.0	1.7	11.8	
John Long	G/F	Detroit Mercy	1	1989–1990	48	1,030	83	85	404	21.5	1.7	1.8	8.4	
Clyde Lovellette^	F/C	Kansas	4	1958–1962	245	6,855	2,353	458	4,733	28.0	9.6	1.9	19.3	
Sidney Lowe	G	NC State	1	1984–1985	15	159	15	42	24	10.6	1.0	2.8	1.6	
Tyronn Lue	G	Nebraska	4	2004–2008	189	4,814	336	681	2,084	25.5	1.8	3.6	11.0	
Seth Lundy	F	Penn State	1	2023–2024	9	52	7	0	14	5.8	0.8	0.0	1.6	
Timothé Luwawu-Cabarrot	F	(Serbia) Mega Basket	1	2021–2022	52	685	82	40	227	13.2	1.6	0.8	4.4	

=== M ===
All-time roster
Player	Pos.	Pre-draft team	Yrs	Seasons	Statistics									Ref.
Player	Pos.	Pre-draft team	Yrs	Seasons	GP	MP	REB	AST	PTS	MPG	RPG	APG	PPG	Ref.
Ed Macauley^	F/C	Saint Louis	3	1956–1959	158	4,686	958	358	2,271	29.7	6.1	2.3	14.4	
Ronnie MacGilvray	G	St. John's	1	1954–1955	6	57	9	11	8	9.5	1.5	1.8	1.3	
Shelvin Mack	G	Butler	4	2012–2016	172	2,770	285	508	1,040	16.1	1.7	3.0	6.0	
Rudy Macklin	G/F	LSU	2	1981–1983	152	2,687	453	118	995	17.7	3.0	0.8	6.5	
Josh Magette	G	Alabama–Huntsville	1	2017–2018	18	216	19	57	46	12.0	1.1	3.2	2.6	
John Mahnken	C	Georgetown	1	1949–1950	36	0	0	64	223	0.0	0.0	1.8	6.2	
Moses Malone^	F/C	Petersburg HS (VA)	3	1988–1991	244	7,525	2,435	310	4,034	30.8	10.0	1.3	16.5	
Matt Maloney	G	Penn	2	2000–2001; 2002–2003	69	1,506	124	171	393	21.8	1.8	2.5	5.7	
Terance Mann	G	Florida State	1	2024–2025	30	682	92	62	294	22.7	3.1	2.1	9.8	
Danny Manning	F/C	Kansas	1	1993–1994	26	925	169	85	409	35.6	6.5	3.3	15.7	
Pace Mannion	G	Utah	1	1988–1989	5	18	2	2	4	3.6	0.4	0.4	0.8	
Nick Mantis	G	Northwestern	1	1962–1963	9	58	6	7	19	6.4	0.7	0.8	2.1	
Pete Maravich (#44)^	G	LSU	4	1970–1974	302	11,220	1,274	1,690	7,325	37.2	4.2	5.6	24.3	
Roy Marble	G/F	Iowa	1	1989–1990	24	162	24	11	51	6.8	1.0	0.5	2.1	
Cartier Martin	F	Kansas State	1	2013–2014	53	822	105	31	314	15.5	2.0	0.6	5.9	
Phil Martin	G	Toledo	1	1954–1955	7	47	10	6	12	6.7	1.4	0.9	1.7	
Slater Martin^	G	Texas	4	1956–1960	248	8,333	914	1,114	2,414	33.6	3.7	4.5	9.7	
Tyrese Martin	G	UConn	1	2022–2023	16	66	12	2	21	4.1	0.8	0.1	1.3	
Al Masino	G	Canisius	1	1952–1953	72	1,773	177	160	396	24.6	2.5	2.2	5.5	
Eddie Mast	F/C	Temple	1	1972–1973	42	447	136	37	119	10.6	3.2	0.9	2.8	
Garrison Mathews	G	Lipscomb	3	2022–2025	122	1,906	190	100	721	15.6	1.6	0.8	5.9	
Wes Matthews	G	Wisconsin	5	1980–1984; 1989–1990	152	3,238	225	626	1,245	21.3	1.5	4.1	8.2	
Wesley Matthews	G	Marquette	1	2023–2024	36	413	53	23	110	11.5	1.5	0.6	3.1	
Don May	F	Dayton	2	1971–1973	107	1,602	284	76	738	15.0	2.7	0.7	6.9	
Skylar Mays	G	LSU	2	2020–2022	61	489	60	47	204	8.0	1.0	0.8	3.3	
Travis Mays	G	Texas	2	1991–1993	51	819	55	73	358	16.1	1.1	1.4	7.0	
Ken McBride	G/F	Maryland Eastern Shore	1	1954–1955	12	249	31	14	117	20.8	2.6	1.2	9.8	
Johnny McCarthy	G	Canisius	3	1959–1962	169	5,235	682	828	1,331	31.0	4.0	4.9	7.9	
Amal McCaskill	F/C	Marquette	1	2002–2003	11	70	22	5	11	6.4	2.0	0.5	1.0	
CJ McCollum^{x}	G	Lehigh	1	2025–2026	41	1,182	128	167	766	28.8	3.1	4.1	18.7	
John McConathy	F	Northwestern State	1	1951–1952	11	106	20	8	14	9.6	1.8	0.7	1.3	
Bucky McConnell	G	Marshall	1	1952–1953	14	297	34	41	68	21.2	2.4	2.9	4.9	
Tim McCormick	C	Michigan	1	1990–1991	56	689	165	32	252	12.3	2.9	0.6	4.5	
Jelani McCoy	C	UCLA	1	2004–2005	10	88	21	0	15	8.8	2.1	0.0	1.5	
Jim McElroy	G	Central Michigan	3	1979–1982	105	1,545	114	188	510	14.7	1.1	1.8	4.9	
Mike McGee	G/F	Michigan	2	1986–1988	87	1,537	175	162	839	17.7	2.0	1.9	9.6	
Bill McGill	F/C	Utah	1	1964–1965	16	96	24	6	40	6.0	1.5	0.4	2.5	
Tracy McGrady^	G/F	MZCA (NC)	1	2011–2012	52	837	154	110	273	16.1	3.0	2.1	5.3	
Roshown McLeod	F	Duke	3	1998–2001	112	2,115	306	124	815	18.9	2.7	1.1	7.3	
Jack McMahon	G	St. John's	5	1955–1960	277	8,009	700	1,154	2,119	28.9	2.5	4.2	7.6	
Tom McMillen	F/C	Maryland	6	1977–1983	416	8,866	1,816	492	3,523	21.3	4.4	1.2	8.5	
Shellie McMillon	F	Bradley	1	1961–1962	48	1,035	304	53	566	21.6	6.3	1.1	11.8	
Carl McNulty	G	Purdue	1	1954–1955	1	14	0	0	2	14.0	0.0	0.0	2.0	
Slava Medvedenko	F	(Ukraine) Budivelnyk	1	2006–2007	14	81	14	2	42	5.8	1.0	0.1	3.0	
Dick Mehen	F/C	Tennessee	1	1951–1952	65	2,294	282	171	703	35.3	4.3	2.6	10.8	
Dean Meminger	G	Marquette	2	1974–1976	148	3,595	365	619	1,044	24.3	2.5	4.2	7.1	
Joe Meriweather	F/C	Southern Illinois	1	1976–1977	74	2,068	596	82	820	27.9	8.1	1.1	11.1	
Stan Miasek	F/C		1	1952–1953	40	749	161	50	229	18.7	4.0	1.3	5.7	
Anthony Miller	F	Michigan State	4	1996–1998; 2000–2001; 2004–2005	42	257	80	4	85	6.1	1.9	0.1	2.0	
Eddie Miller	F/C	Syracuse	1	1952–1953	10	160	60	6	39	16.0	6.0	0.6	3.9	
Jay Miller	F	Notre Dame	1	1967–1968	8	52	7	1	20	6.5	0.9	0.1	2.5	
Patty Mills	G	Saint Mary's	1	2023–2024	19	202	20	14	51	10.6	1.1	0.7	2.7	
Paul Millsap^{+}	F	Louisiana Tech	4	2013–2017	297	9,862	2,462	972	5,177	33.2	8.3	3.3	17.4	
Dave Minor	G/F	UCLA	1	1952–1953	40	1,309	211	105	318	32.7	5.3	2.6	8.0	
Nazr Mohammed	C	Kentucky	4	2000–2004	198	4,267	1,299	76	1,645	21.6	6.6	0.4	8.3	
Sidney Moncrief^	G	Arkansas	1	1990–1991	72	1,096	128	104	337	15.2	1.8	1.4	4.7	
Rodney Monroe	G	NC State	1	1991–1992	38	313	33	27	131	8.2	0.9	0.7	3.4	
Jackie Moore	F	La Salle	1	1954–1955	0	0	0	0	0					
Mikki Moore	F/C	Nebraska	1	2002–2003	5	31	7	3	18	6.2	1.4	0.6	3.6	
Jaylen Morris	G	Molloy	1	2017–2018	6	98	16	7	28	16.3	2.7	1.2	4.7	
Randolph Morris	C	Kentucky	2	2008–2010	51	213	58	4	80	4.2	1.1	0.1	1.6	
Red Morrison	F/C	Idaho	1	1957–1958	13	79	26	0	21	6.1	2.0	0.0	1.6	
Anthony Morrow	G	Georgia Tech	1	2012–2013	24	301	26	9	125	12.5	1.1	0.4	5.2	
Hanno Möttölä	C	Utah	2	2000–2002	155	2,360	442	75	715	15.2	2.9	0.5	4.6	
Jeff Mullins	G/F	Duke	2	1964–1966	88	1,079	171	110	470	12.3	1.9	1.3	5.3	
Todd Mundt	C	Delta State	1	1995–1996	24	118	25	2	31	4.9	1.0	0.1	1.3	
Dejounte Murray	G	Washington	2	2022–2024	152	5,476	805	950	3,268	36.0	5.3	6.3	21.5	
Ronald Murray	G	Shaw	1	2008–2009	80	1,975	168	158	974	24.7	2.1	2.0	12.2	
Mike Muscala	F/C	Bucknell	5	2013–2018	243	3,579	758	212	1,308	14.7	3.1	0.9	5.4	
Dikembe Mutombo (#55)^	C	Georgetown	5	1996–2001	343	12,419	4,321	408	4,095	36.2	12.6	1.2	11.9	

=== N to O ===
All-time roster
Player	Pos.	Pre-draft team	Yrs	Seasons	Statistics									Ref.
Player	Pos.	Pre-draft team	Yrs	Seasons	GP	MP	REB	AST	PTS	MPG	RPG	APG	PPG	Ref.
Lee Nailon	F	TCU	1	2003–2004	27	300	63	17	142	11.1	2.3	0.6	5.3	
Larry Nance Jr.	F	Wyoming	1	2024–2025	24	463	103	38	203	19.3	4.3	1.6	8.5	
Howard Nathan	G	Louisiana–Monroe	1	1995–1996	5	15	0	2	13	3.0	0.0	0.4	2.6	
Willie Naulls	F/C	UCLA	1	1956–1957	19	438	167	22	195	23.1	8.8	1.2	10.3	
Mamadou N'Diaye	C	Auburn	1	2003–2004	25	359	111	0	98	14.4	4.4	0.0	3.9	
Gary Neal	G	Towson	1	2016–2017	2	18	1	1	4	9.0	0.5	0.5	2.0	
Ivano Newbill	F	Georgia Tech	1	1996–1997	72	850	204	24	100	11.8	2.8	0.3	1.4	
Ira Newble	F	Miami (OH)	2	2001–2003	115	3,204	493	144	902	27.9	4.3	1.3	7.8	
Asa Newell^{x}	F	Georgia	1	2025–2026	44	500	96	26	227	11.4	2.2	0.6	5.2	
Dave Newmark	C	Columbia	1	1969–1970	64	612	174	42	313	9.6	2.7	0.7	4.9	
Georges Niang	F	Iowa State	1	2024–2025	28	644	83	44	339	23.0	3.0	1.6	12.1	
Jack Nichols	F/C	Washington	4	1949–1951; 1952–1954	108	2,982	596	295	1,481	27.6	5.5	2.7	13.7	
Bevo Nordmann	C	Saint Louis	2	1962–1964	39	424	125	12	122	10.9	3.2	0.3	3.1	
Ken Norman	F	Illinois	3	1994–1997	125	2,869	533	169	1,306	23.0	4.3	1.4	10.4	
George Nostrand	F/C	Wyoming	1	1949–1950	1	0	0	1	12	0.0	0.0	1.0	12.0	
James Nunnally	F	UC Santa Barbara	1	2013–2014	4	54	8	2	18	13.5	2.0	0.5	4.5	
John O'Boyle	G	Colorado State	1	1952–1953	5	97	10	5	21	19.4	2.0	1.0	4.2	
Don Ohl	G	Illinois	3	1967–1970	173	3,802	303	392	1,732	22.0	1.8	2.3	10.0	
Onyeka Okongwu^{x}	C	USC	6	2020–2026	381	9,208	2,620	625	4,083	24.2	6.9	1.6	10.7	
Brian Oliver	G	Georgia Tech	1	1997–1998	5	61	9	2	15	12.2	1.8	0.4	3.0	
Cameron Oliver	F	Nevada	1	2021–2022	2	43	6	3	23	21.5	3.0	1.5	11.5	
Grady O'Malley	F	Manhattan	1	1969–1970	24	113	26	10	50	4.7	1.1	0.4	2.1	
Mike O'Neill	F	California	1	1952–1953	4	50	9	3	12	12.5	2.3	0.8	3.0	
Kevin O'Shea	G	Notre Dame	1	1951–1952	43	1,077	122	101	258	25.0	2.8	2.3	6.0	
Don Otten	C	Bowling Green	3	1949–1950; 1951–1953	127	2,110	504	212	1,431	16.6	4.0	1.7	11.3	
Mac Otten	F/C	Bowling Green	1	1949–1950	12	0	0	11	39	0.0	0.0	0.9	3.3	
Red Owens	G/F	Baylor	2	1949–1950; 1951–1952	36	285	31	64	204	7.9	0.9	1.8	5.7	

=== P ===
All-time roster
Player	Pos.	Pre-draft team	Yrs	Seasons	Statistics									Ref.
Player	Pos.	Pre-draft team	Yrs	Seasons	GP	MP	REB	AST	PTS	MPG	RPG	APG	PPG	Ref.
Zaza Pachulia	C	(Turkey) Ülkerspor	8	2005–2013	556	12,002	3,216	586	4,032	21.6	5.8	1.1	7.3	
Andy Panko	F	Lebanon Valley	1	2000–2001	1	1	0	0	0	1.0	0.0	0.0	0.0	
Jannero Pargo	G	Arkansas	2	2011–2013	57	784	80	115	317	13.8	1.4	2.0	5.6	
Med Park	G/F	Missouri	4	1955–1959	206	2,885	516	238	964	14.0	2.5	1.2	4.7	
Jabari Parker	F	Duke	1	2019–2020	32	837	191	58	480	26.2	6.0	1.8	15.0	
Chandler Parsons	F	Florida	1	2019–2020	5	54	7	3	14	10.8	1.4	0.6	2.8	
Lamar Patterson	G/F	Pittsburgh	2	2015–2017	40	435	57	45	93	10.9	1.4	1.1	2.3	
Worthy Patterson	G	UConn	1	1957–1958	4	13	2	2	7	3.3	0.5	0.5	1.8	
Billy Paultz	F/C	St. John's	1	1983–1984	40	486	113	18	89	12.2	2.8	0.5	2.2	
John Payak	G/F	Bowling Green	1	1952–1953	68	1,470	114	140	436	21.6	1.7	2.1	6.4	
Adreian Payne	F/C	Michigan State	1	2014–2015	3	19	4	0	5	6.3	1.3	0.0	1.7	
Tom Payne	C	Kentucky	1	1971–1972	29	227	69	15	119	7.8	2.4	0.5	4.1	
Sam Pellom	F/C	Buffalo	4	1979–1983	192	2,891	677	95	855	15.1	3.5	0.5	4.5	
Warren Perkins	G/F	Tulane	2	1949–1951	126	0	319	257	767	0.0	2.5	2.0	6.1	
Wesley Person	G	Auburn	1	2003–2004	9	132	25	5	40	14.7	2.8	0.6	4.4	
Bob Peterson	F	Oregon	1	1953–1954	4	24	10	3	8	6.0	2.5	0.8	2.0	
Ed Peterson	C	Cornell	1	1950–1951	36	0	250	58	279	0.0	6.9	1.6	7.8	
Johan Petro	C	(France) Élan Béarnais	1	2012–2013	31	352	112	16	108	11.4	3.6	0.5	3.5	
Bob Pettit (#9)^	F/C	LSU	11	1954–1965	792	30,690	12,849	2,369	20,880	38.8	16.2	3.0	26.4	
John Pinone	F	Villanova	1	1983–1984	7	65	10	3	20	9.3	1.4	0.4	2.9	
Dave Piontek	F/C	Xavier	2	1959–1961	54	976	188	53	305	18.1	3.5	1.0	5.6	
Dexter Pittman	C	Texas	1	2013–2014	2	3	3	0	0	1.5	1.5	0.0	0.0	
Daeqwon Plowden	G	Bowling Green	1	2024–2025	6	72	11	2	43	12.0	1.8	0.3	7.2	
Miles Plumlee	F/C	Duke	2	2017–2019	73	1,091	267	62	317	14.9	3.7	0.8	4.3	
Kristaps Porziņģis	C	(Spain) Sevilla	1	2025–2026	17	413	87	46	291	24.3	5.1	2.7	17.1	
Josh Powell	F	NC State	1	2010–2011	54	653	135	22	224	12.1	2.5	0.4	4.1	
Alex Poythress	F	Kentucky	1	2018–2019	21	305	76	17	107	14.5	3.6	0.8	5.1	
Taurean Prince	F	Baylor	3	2016–2019	196	4,997	745	387	2,235	25.5	3.8	2.0	11.4	
Joel Przybilla	C	Minnesota	1	2003–2004	12	314	101	4	48	26.2	8.4	0.3	4.0	

=== R ===
All-time roster
Player	Pos.	Pre-draft team	Yrs	Seasons	Statistics									Ref.
Player	Pos.	Pre-draft team	Yrs	Seasons	GP	MP	REB	AST	PTS	MPG	RPG	APG	PPG	Ref.
Vladimir Radmanović	F	(Serbia) Crvena zvezda	1	2011–2012	49	755	143	54	220	15.4	2.9	1.1	4.5	
Cal Ramsey	F	NYU	1	1959–1960	4	35	19	0	17	8.8	4.8	0.0	4.3	
Blair Rasmussen	C	Oregon	2	1991–1993	103	2,251	448	112	800	21.9	4.3	1.1	7.8	
George Ratkovicz	F/C	Lindblom Academy (IL)	3	1952–1955	139	4,310	1,010	366	1,213	31.0	7.3	2.6	8.7	
Theo Ratliff	F/C	Wyoming	3	2001–2004	137	4,248	1,004	125	1,170	31.0	7.3	0.9	8.5	
Leo Rautins	F	Syracuse	1	1984–1985	4	12	2	3	0	3.0	0.5	0.8	0.0	
Don Ray	F/C	Western Kentucky	1	1949–1950	61	0	0	60	364	0.0	0.0	1.0	6.0	
Željko Rebrača	C	(Serbia) Partizan	1	2003–2004	3	51	9	2	25	17.0	3.0	0.7	8.3	
Eldridge Recasner	G	Washington	2	1996–1998	130	2,661	257	211	953	20.5	2.0	1.6	7.3	
Cam Reddish	F	Duke	3	2019–2022	118	3,098	404	160	1,308	26.3	3.4	1.4	11.1	
Hub Reed	F/C	Oklahoma City	2	1958–1960	67	967	319	32	327	14.4	4.8	0.5	4.9	
Don Rehfeldt	F	Wisconsin	1	1951–1952	29	594	174	38	207	20.5	6.0	1.3	7.1	
John Rennicke	G	Drake	1	1951–1952	6	54	9	1	11	9.0	1.5	0.2	1.8	
Jeremy Richardson	G/F	Delta State	2	2006–2008	24	107	9	0	39	4.5	0.4	0.0	1.6	
Dick Ricketts	F/C	Duquesne	1	1955–1956	29	777	196	82	243	26.8	6.8	2.8	8.4	
Isaiah Rider	G	UNLV	1	1999–2000	60	2,084	258	219	1,158	34.7	4.3	3.7	19.3	
Bob Riley	F	Mount St. Mary's	1	1970–1971	7	39	12	1	13	5.6	1.7	0.1	1.9	
Zaccharie Risacher^{x}	F	(France) JL Bourg	2	2024–2026	142	3,346	525	168	1,583	23.6	3.7	1.2	11.1	
Doc Rivers^{+}	G	Marquette	8	1983–1991	568	17,301	2,000	3,866	7,357	30.5	3.5	6.8	13.0	
Tony Robertson	G	West Virginia	1	1977–1978	63	929	70	103	373	14.7	1.1	1.6	5.9	
Glenn Robinson	F	Purdue	1	2002–2003	69	2,591	457	205	1,436	37.6	6.6	3.0	20.8	
Larry Robinson	G/F	Centenary	1	2000–2001	33	631	87	36	199	19.1	2.6	1.1	6.0	
Rumeal Robinson	G	Michigan	2	1990–1992	128	2,894	290	578	1,320	22.6	2.3	4.5	10.3	
Truck Robinson	F/C	Tennessee State	1	1976–1977	36	1,449	462	97	806	40.3	12.8	2.7	22.4	
David Roddy	F	Colorado State	1	2024–2025	27	346	70	30	122	12.8	2.6	1.1	4.5	
Ken Rohloff	G	NC State	1	1963–1964	2	7	0	1	0	3.5	0.0	0.5	0.0	
Phil Rollins	G	Louisville	1	1960–1961	7	71	3	11	18	10.1	0.4	1.6	2.6	
Tree Rollins	C	Clemson	11	1977–1988	814	20,763	5,994	570	5,666	25.5	7.4	0.7	7.0	
Rajon Rondo	G	Kentucky	1	2020–2021	27	402	55	95	106	14.9	2.0	3.5	3.9	
Sean Rooks	C	Arizona	1	1995–1996	16	215	51	9	93	13.4	3.2	0.6	5.8	
Dan Roundfield^{+}	F/C	Central Michigan	6	1978–1984	435	14,893	4,658	1,047	7,644	34.2	10.7	2.4	17.6	
Walker Russell	G	Western Michigan	1	1984–1985	21	377	40	66	83	18.0	1.9	3.1	4.0	

=== S ===
All-time roster
Player	Pos.	Pre-draft team	Yrs	Seasons	Statistics									Ref.
Player	Pos.	Pre-draft team	Yrs	Seasons	GP	MP	REB	AST	PTS	MPG	RPG	APG	PPG	Ref.
Pepe Sánchez	G	Temple	1	2000–2001	5	34	1	5	0	6.8	0.2	1.0	0.0	
Jeff Sanders	F	Georgia Southern	2	1991–1993	21	237	55	15	71	11.3	2.6	0.7	3.4	
Frank Saul	G/F	Seton Hall	1	1954–1955	65	1,139	134	104	287	17.5	2.1	1.6	4.4	
Woody Sauldsberry	F/C	Texas Southern	3	1960–1963	106	1,861	571	86	658	17.6	5.4	0.8	6.2	
Bob Schafer	G	Villanova	1	1955–1956	42	496	58	44	193	11.8	1.4	1.0	4.6	
Herb Scherer	C	LIU Brooklyn	1	1950–1951	20	0	50	17	68	0.0	2.5	0.9	3.4	
Dale Schlueter	C	Colorado State	1	1973–1974	57	547	155	45	164	9.6	2.7	0.8	2.9	
Dennis Schröder	G	(Germany) Löwen Braunschweig	5	2013–2018	352	8,341	884	1,675	4,545	23.7	2.5	4.8	12.9	
Dick Schulz	G/F	Wisconsin	1	1949–1950	8	0	0	8	41	0.0	0.0	1.0	5.1	
Mike Scott	F	Virginia	5	2012–2017	281	4,322	836	257	1,988	15.4	3.0	0.9	7.1	
Thabo Sefolosha	G/F	(Italy) Pallacanestro Biella	3	2014–2017	189	4,330	827	289	1,202	22.9	4.4	1.5	6.4	
Frank Selvy^{+}	G/F	Furman	3	1954–1956; 1957–1958	43	639	107	51	246	14.9	2.5	1.2	5.7	
Chuck Share	C	Bowling Green	7	1953–1960	442	10,291	3,999	597	4,119	23.3	9.0	1.4	9.3	
Craig Shelton	F	Georgetown	2	1980–1982	59	607	141	27	240	10.3	2.4	0.5	4.1	
Jeff Sheppard	G	Kentucky	1	1998–1999	18	185	22	16	40	10.3	1.2	0.9	2.2	
Paul Shirley	F/C	Iowa State	1	2002–2003	2	5	1	0	0	2.5	0.5	0.0	0.0	
Jordan Sibert	G	Dayton	1	2018–2019	1	4	0	0	3	4.0	0.0	0.0	3.0	
Larry Siegfried	F	Ohio State	1	1971–1972	21	335	32	52	70	16.0	1.5	2.5	3.3	
Paul Silas	F/C	Creighton	5	1964–1969	363	7,904	3,184	446	2,848	21.8	8.8	1.2	7.8	
Dickey Simpkins	F	Providence	1	2001–2002	1	3	0	1	0	3.0	0.0	1.0	0.0	
Bob Sims	G/F	Pepperdine	1	1961–1962	46	1,174	156	142	446	25.5	3.4	3.1	9.7	
Reggie Slater	F	Wyoming	1	2001–2002	4	37	7	1	16	9.3	1.8	0.3	4.0	
Donald Sloan	G	Texas A&M	1	2011–2012	5	20	5	5	6	4.0	1.0	1.0	1.2	
Donta Smith	G/F	Southeastern Illinois	2	2004–2006	61	560	66	48	165	9.2	1.1	0.8	2.7	
Joe Smith	F	Maryland	1	2009–2010	64	592	157	21	194	9.3	2.5	0.3	3.0	
Josh Smith	F	Oak Hill Academy (VA)	9	2004–2013	676	23,078	5,407	2,170	10,371	34.1	8.0	3.2	15.3	
Kenny Smith	G	North Carolina	1	1989–1990	33	674	37	142	255	20.4	1.1	4.3	7.7	
Leon Smith	C	King College Prep (IL)	1	2001–2002	14	100	31	3	31	7.1	2.2	0.2	2.2	
Randy Smith	G/F	Buffalo State	1	1982–1983	15	142	8	14	71	9.5	0.5	0.9	4.7	
Steve Smith^{+}	G	Michigan State	5	1994–1999	339	12,448	1,294	1,206	6,291	36.7	3.8	3.6	18.6	
Tony Smith	G	Marquette	1	2000–2001	6	78	3	10	17	13.0	0.5	1.7	2.8	
Tony Snell	G/F	New Mexico	1	2020–2021	47	992	112	59	249	21.1	2.4	1.3	5.3	
Dick Snyder	G/F	Davidson	2	1966–1968	130	2,298	285	223	977	17.7	2.2	1.7	7.5	
Mike Sojourner	F/C	Utah	3	1974–1977	191	4,282	1,237	172	1,658	22.4	6.5	0.9	8.7	
Rory Sparrow	G	Villanova	2	1981–1983	131	4,158	365	662	1,472	31.7	2.8	5.1	11.2	
Odie Spears	G	Western Kentucky	1	1956–1957	0	0	0	0	0					
Omari Spellman	F	Villanova	1	2018–2019	46	805	194	47	272	17.5	4.2	1.0	5.9	
Andre Spencer	F	Northern Arizona	1	1992–1993	3	15	1	0	0	5.0	0.3	0.0	0.0	
Tiago Splitter	F/C	(Spain) Saski Baskonia	1	2015–2016	36	579	120	30	201	16.1	3.3	0.8	5.6	
Jerry Stackhouse	G/F	North Carolina	1	2011–2012	30	273	23	14	108	9.1	0.8	0.5	3.6	
Jack Stephens	G/F	Notre Dame	1	1955–1956	72	2,219	377	207	743	30.8	5.2	2.9	10.3	
Lance Stephenson	G	Cincinnati	1	2021–2022	6	70	15	11	11	11.7	2.5	1.8	1.8	
DeShawn Stevenson	G	Washington Union HS (CA)	1	2012–2013	56	1,158	122	52	284	20.7	2.2	0.9	5.1	
Michael Stewart	C	California	1	2004–2005	12	145	40	5	25	12.1	3.3	0.4	2.1	
Norm Stewart	F	Missouri	1	1956–1957	5	37	5	2	10	7.4	1.0	0.4	2.0	
Alex Stivrins	F	Colorado	1	1992–1993	5	15	5	0	8	3.0	1.0	0.0	1.6	
Salim Stoudamire	G	Arizona	3	2005–2008	157	2,672	214	164	1,260	17.0	1.4	1.0	8.0	
Mark Strickland	F	Temple	1	2001–2002	46	654	131	20	208	14.2	2.8	0.4	4.5	
Don Sunderlage^{+}	G	Illinois	1	1953–1954	68	2,232	225	187	760	32.8	3.3	2.8	11.2	
Bob Sura	G	Florida State	1	2003–2004	27	956	223	144	397	35.4	8.3	5.3	14.7	
Dick Surhoff	F	LIU Brooklyn	1	1953–1954	32	358	69	23	133	11.2	2.2	0.7	4.2	
Pape Sy	F	(France) STB Le Havre	1	2010–2011	3	21	3	2	7	7.0	1.0	0.7	2.3	

=== T ===
All-time roster
Player	Pos.	Pre-draft team	Yrs	Seasons	Statistics									Ref.
Player	Pos.	Pre-draft team	Yrs	Seasons	GP	MP	REB	AST	PTS	MPG	RPG	APG	PPG	Ref.
Edy Tavares	C	(Spain) Gran Canaria	2	2015–2017	12	77	22	3	27	6.4	1.8	0.3	2.3	
Isaiah Taylor	G	Texas	1	2017–2018	67	1,167	94	206	445	17.4	1.4	3.1	6.6	
Jeff Teague^{+}	G	Wake Forest	8	2009–2016; 2019–2020	543	14,037	1,168	2,771	6,484	25.9	2.2	5.1	11.9	
Claude Terry	G/F	Stanford	2	1976–1978	39	407	33	32	171	10.4	0.8	0.8	4.4	
Jason Terry	G	Arizona	5	1999–2004	403	14,043	1,320	2,230	6,534	34.8	3.3	5.5	16.2	
Reggie Theus	G	UNLV	1	1988–1989	82	2,517	242	387	1,296	30.7	3.0	4.7	15.8	
Etan Thomas	F	Syracuse	1	2010–2011	13	82	23	2	32	6.3	1.8	0.2	2.5	
James Thomas	F	Texas	1	2004–2005	2	5	2	0	2	2.5	1.0	0.0	1.0	
John Thomas	F	Minnesota	1	2005–2006	11	66	10	1	9	6.0	0.9	0.1	0.8	
Dijon Thompson	G/F	UCLA	1	2006–2007	6	50	8	2	17	8.3	1.3	0.3	2.8	
Rod Thorn^	G	West Virginia	2	1965–1967	113	2,090	269	199	995	18.5	2.4	1.8	8.8	
Mike Todorovich	F/C	Wyoming	2	1949–1951	117	0	455	367	1,348	0.0	3.9	3.1	11.5	
Ray Tolbert	F	Indiana	1	1988–1989	50	341	88	16	103	6.8	1.8	0.3	2.1	
Anthony Tolliver	F/C	Creighton	1	2012–2013	62	963	155	32	253	15.5	2.5	0.5	4.1	
Sedric Toney	G	Dayton	2	1985–1986; 1989–1990	35	310	16	52	93	8.9	0.5	1.5	2.7	
Jacob Toppin	F	Kentucky	2	2024–2026	6	44	5	3	25	7.3	0.8	0.5	4.2	
Bumper Tormohlen	F/C	Tennessee	6	1962–1964; 1965–1968; 1969–1970	271	3,223	1,122	257	1,191	11.9	4.1	0.9	4.4	
Bill Tosheff	G	Indiana	1	1953–1954	71	1,825	163	196	492	25.7	2.3	2.8	6.9	
George Trapp	F/C	Long Beach State	2	1971–1973	137	2,743	638	178	1,261	20.0	4.7	1.3	9.2	
John Tresvant	F/C	Seattle	2	1964–1966	19	248	103	16	115	13.1	5.4	0.8	6.1	
John Tschogl	F	UC Santa Barbara	2	1972–1974	74	593	97	39	158	8.0	1.3	0.5	2.1	
Evan Turner	G	Ohio State	1	2019–2020	19	251	38	38	62	13.2	2.0	2.0	3.3	
Jeremy Tyler	C	San Diego HS (CA)	1	2012–2013	1	5	3	0	0	5.0	3.0	0.0	0.0	

=== V to Z ===
All-time roster
Player	Pos.	Pre-draft team	Yrs	Seasons	Statistics									Ref.
Player	Pos.	Pre-draft team	Yrs	Seasons	GP	MP	REB	AST	PTS	MPG	RPG	APG	PPG	Ref.
John Vallely	G	UCLA	2	1970–1972	60	540	45	56	244	9.0	0.8	0.9	4.1	
Tom Van Arsdale	G/F	Indiana	2	1974–1976	148	4,596	435	353	2,200	31.1	2.9	2.4	14.9	
Gene Vance	G/F	Illinois	3	1949–1952	71	118	109	187	468	1.7	1.5	2.6	6.6	
Chico Vaughn	G	Southern Illinois	4	1962–1966	239	5,595	603	574	2,421	23.4	2.5	2.4	10.1	
Jacque Vaughn	G	Kansas	2	2001–2002; 2003–2004	153	3,127	284	544	810	20.4	1.9	3.6	5.3	
Gabe Vincent^{x}	G	UC Santa Barbara	1	2025–2026	24	320	27	39	93	13.3	1.1	1.6	3.9	
Fred Vinson	G	Georgia Tech	1	1994–1995	5	27	0	1	4	5.4	0.0	0.2	0.8	
Alexander Volkov	C	(Ukraine) BC Budivelnyk	2	1989–1990; 1991–1992	149	2,453	384	333	1,019	16.5	2.6	2.2	6.8	
Whitey Von Nieda	G/F	Penn State	1	1949–1950	26	0	0	36	109	0.0	0.0	1.4	4.2	
Antoine Walker	F	Kentucky	1	2004–2005	53	2,128	497	194	1,082	40.2	9.4	3.7	20.4	
Keaton Wallace^{x}	G	UTSA	2	2024–2026	84	1,037	106	175	354	12.3	1.3	2.1	4.2	
Rasheed Wallace	F/C	North Carolina	1	2003–2004	1	42	6	2	20	42.0	6.0	2.0	20.0	
Tyrone Wallace	G	California	1	2019–2020	14	160	22	13	40	11.4	1.6	0.9	2.9	
Dwight Waller	F	Tennessee State	1	1968–1969	11	29	10	1	7	2.6	0.9	0.1	0.6	
Isaac Walthour	G	Benjamin Franklin HS (NY)	1	1953–1954	4	30	1	2	2	7.5	0.3	0.5	0.5	
Gerry Ward	G	Boston College	1	1963–1964	24	139	21	21	43	5.8	0.9	0.9	1.8	
Chris Washburn	C	NC State	1	1987–1988	29	174	55	3	57	6.0	1.9	0.1	2.0	
Jim Washington	F/C	Villanova	5	1965–1966; 1971–1975	318	9,777	2,683	562	3,011	30.7	8.4	1.8	9.5	
Bobby Watson	G	Kentucky	1	1954–1955	13	156	23	17	29	12.0	1.8	1.3	2.2	
Paul Watson	F	Fresno State	1	2019–2020	2	17	2	3	0	8.5	1.0	1.5	0.0	
Spud Webb	G	NC State	7	1985–1991; 1995–1996	483	9,525	887	2,159	3,702	19.7	1.8	4.5	7.7	
Mario West	G	Georgia Tech	3	2007–2010	156	680	131	41	132	4.4	0.8	0.3	0.8	
Mark West	F/C	Old Dominion	1	1998–1999	49	499	125	13	60	10.2	2.6	0.3	1.2	
John Wetzel	G/F	Virginia Tech	3	1972–1975	161	2,521	342	254	595	15.7	2.1	1.6	3.7	
Ennis Whatley	G	Alabama	3	1987–1988; 1993–1995	114	1,320	133	237	373	11.6	1.2	2.1	3.3	
Andrew White	G	Syracuse	1	2017–2018	15	209	34	6	69	13.9	2.3	0.4	4.6	
Herb White	G	Georgia	1	1970–1971	38	315	48	47	90	8.3	1.3	1.2	2.4	
Donald Whiteside	G	Northern Illinois	1	1997–1998	3	16	1	1	2	5.3	0.3	0.3	0.7	
Murray Wier	G	Iowa	1	1949–1950	56	0	0	107	429	0.0	0.0	1.9	7.7	
Morlon Wiley	G	Long Beach State	3	1991–1993; 1994–1995	71	1,138	112	253	256	16.0	1.6	3.6	3.6	
Win Wilfong	G/F	Memphis	2	1957–1959	134	2,101	411	213	815	15.7	3.1	1.6	6.1	
Lenny Wilkens^	G	Providence	8	1960–1968	555	19,552	2,741	3,049	8,591	35.2	4.9	5.5	15.5	
Damien Wilkins	G/F	Georgia	1	2010–2011	52	676	90	41	180	13.0	1.7	0.8	3.5	
Dominique Wilkins (#21)^	G/F	Georgia	12	1982–1994	882	32,545	6,119	2,321	23,292	36.9	6.9	2.6	26.4	
Mike Wilks	G	Rice	1	2002–2003	15	364	41	42	85	24.3	2.7	2.8	5.7	
Brandon Williams	G	Davidson	1	2002–2003	6	19	2	0	2	3.2	0.3	0.0	0.3	
Donovan Williams	G	UNLV	1	2022–2023	2	4	2	0	4	2.0	1.0	0.0	2.0	
Freeman Williams	G/F	Portland State	1	1981–1982	23	189	12	19	110	8.2	0.5	0.8	4.8	
Gus Williams	G	USC	1	1986–1987	33	481	40	139	138	14.6	1.2	4.2	4.2	
Lou Williams	G	South Gwinnett HS (GA)	4	2012–2014; 2020–2022	179	3,868	341	535	1,769	21.6	1.9	3.0	9.9	
Marvin Williams	F	North Carolina	7	2005–2012	487	14,822	2,582	654	5,616	30.4	5.3	1.3	11.5	
Mike Williams	F	Bradley	1	1989–1990	5	14	1	0	0	2.8	0.2	0.0	0.0	
Milt Williams	G	Lincoln (MO)	1	1971–1972	10	127	4	20	67	12.7	0.4	2.0	6.7	
Ray Williams	G	Minnesota	1	1985–1986	19	367	45	67	159	19.3	2.4	3.5	8.4	
Shammond Williams	G	North Carolina	1	1998–1999	2	4	0	1	3	2.0	0.0	0.5	1.5	
Shelden Williams	F	Duke	2	2006–2008	117	1,928	542	55	553	16.5	4.6	0.5	4.7	
Sly Williams	G/F	Rhode Island	2	1983–1985	47	1,125	218	110	522	23.9	4.6	2.3	11.1	
Kevin Willis^{+}	F/C	Michigan State	11	1984–1988; 1989–1995; 2006–2007	753	22,588	7,332	827	10,582	30.0	9.7	1.1	14.1	
Bill Willoughby	F/C	Dwight Morrow HS (NJ)	2	1975–1977	101	1,419	458	44	485	14.0	4.5	0.4	4.8	
Bob Wilson	G	West Virginia State	1	1951–1952	63	1,308	210	108	236	20.8	3.3	1.7	3.7	
Mike Wilson	G	Marquette	1	1986–1987	2	2	0	1	0	1.0	0.0	0.5	0.0	
Rick Wilson	G	Louisville	2	1978–1980	66	648	79	83	194	9.8	1.2	1.3	2.9	
Trevor Wilson	F	UCLA	1	1990–1991	25	162	40	11	55	6.5	1.6	0.4	2.2	
Dylan Windler	F	Belmont	1	2023–2024	6	73	12	3	28	12.2	2.0	0.5	4.7	
Randy Wittman	G/F	Indiana	5	1983–1988	353	9,460	608	1,015	3,522	26.8	1.7	2.9	10.0	
Al Wood	G/F	North Carolina	1	1981–1982	19	238	44	11	92	12.5	2.3	0.6	4.8	
Leon Wood	G	Cal State Fullerton	1	1987–1988	14	79	6	19	48	5.6	0.4	1.4	3.4	
Haywoode Workman	G	Oral Roberts	1	1989–1990	6	16	3	2	6	2.7	0.5	0.3	1.0	
Mark Workman	F/C	West Virginia	1	1952–1953	5	29	6	1	11	5.8	1.2	0.2	2.2	
Tom Workman	F/C	Seattle	1	1967–1968	19	85	24	3	55	4.5	1.3	0.2	2.9	
Delon Wright	G	Utah	1	2021–2022	77	1,452	220	188	342	18.9	2.9	2.4	4.4	
Howard Wright	F	Stanford	1	1990–1991	4	20	6	0	5	5.0	1.5	0.0	1.3	
Lorenzen Wright	F/C	Memphis	4	1999–2001; 2006–2008	226	4,376	1,093	151	1,515	19.4	4.8	0.7	6.7	
Trae Young^{+}	G	Oklahoma	8	2018–2026	493	16,902	1,702	4,837	12,413	34.3	3.5	9.8	25.2	
Max Zaslofsky	G/F	St. John's	1	1953–1954	9	299	28	23	136	33.2	3.1	2.6	15.1	
Tyler Zeller	F/C	North Carolina	1	2018–2019	2	11	6	1	0	5.5	3.0	0.5	0.0	
