= Atlanta Hawks draft history =

Overview of draft picks by the Atlanta Hawks

The Atlanta Hawks (formerly known as the Tri-Cities Blackhawks, the Milwaukee Hawks, and the St. Louis Hawks) have selected the following players in the National Basketball Association Draft.

== Key ==
Naismith Basketball Hall of Famer	First overall NBA draft pick	Selected for an NBA All-Star Game

== As Atlanta Hawks (1968–present) ==
Year	Round	Pick	Player	Nationality	College/High School/Club
2026	1	8	Kingston Flemings (via NOP)	United States	University of Houston
2026	1	23	Zuby Ejiofor (via CLE)	United States	St. John's University
2026	2	57	Narcisse Ngoy (via BOS) (↳LAC)	France	Poitiers Basket 86 (France)
2025	1	13	Derik Queen (↳NOP)	United States	University of Maryland
2025	1	22	Drake Powell (↳BRK)	United States	University of North Carolina
2025	1	23	Asa Newell (via NOP)	United States	University of Georgia
2024	1	1	Zaccharie Risacher	France	JL Bourg
2023	1	15	Kobe Bufkin	United States	University of Michigan
2023	2	46	Seth Lundy	United States	Penn State University
2022	1	16	AJ Griffin	United States	Duke University
2022	2	44	Ryan Rollins	United States	University of Toledo
2021	1	20	Jalen Johnson	United States	Duke University
2021	2	48	Sharife Cooper	United States	Auburn University
2020	1	6	Onyeka Okongwu	United States	University of Southern California
2020	2	50	Skylar Mays	United States	Louisiana State University
2019	1	10	Cam Reddish	United States	Duke University
2019	2	32	Bruno Fernando	Angola	University of Maryland
2018	1	3	Luka Dončić	Slovenia	Real Madrid (Spain)
2018	1	19	Kevin Huerter	United States	University of Maryland
2018	1	30	Omari Spellman	United States	Villanova University
2018	2	34	Devonte' Graham	United States	University of Kansas
2017	1	19	John Collins	United States	Wake Forest University
2017	2	41	Tyler Dorsey	United States/Greece	University of Oregon
2017	2	60	Alpha Kaba	France	KK Mega Basket (Serbia)
2016	1	21	DeAndre' Bembry	United States	Saint Joseph's University
2016	2	44	Isaia Cordinier	France	Denain Voltaire Basket (France)
2016	2	54	Kay Felder	United States	Oakland University
2015	1	15	Kelly Oubre Jr.	United States	University of Kansas
2015	2	50	Marcus Eriksson	Sweden	FC Barcelona (Spain)
2015	2	59	Dimitrios Agravanis	Greece	Olympiacos Piraeus (Greece)
2014	1	15	Adreian Payne	United States	Michigan State University
2014	2	43	Edy Tavares	Cape Verde	Gran Canaria (Spain)
2013	1	17	Dennis Schröder	Germany	Basketball Löwen Braunschweig (Germany)
2013	1	18	Shane Larkin	United States	University of Miami
2013	2	47	Raulzinho Neto	Brazil	Gipuzkoa Basket (Spain)
2013	2	50	James Ennis	United States	Cal State Long Beach
2012	1	23	John Jenkins	United States	Vanderbilt University
2012	2	43	Mike Scott	United States	University of Virginia
2011	2	48	Keith Benson	United States	Oakland University
2010	1	24	Damion James	United States	University of Texas at Austin
2010	2	53	Pape Sy	France	Le Havre (France)
2009	1	17	Jeff Teague	United States	Wake Forest University
2009	2	49	Sergiy Gladyr	Ukraine	MBC Mykolaiv (Ukraine)
2007	1	3	Al Horford	Dominican Republic	University of Florida
2007	1	11	Acie Law	United States	Texas A&M University
2006	1	5	Shelden Williams	United States	Duke University
2006	2	33	Solomon Jones	United States	University of South Florida
2005	1	2	Marvin Williams	United States	University of North Carolina
2005	2	31	Salim Stoudamire	United States	University of Arizona
2005	2	59	Cenk Akyol	Turkey	Efes Pilsen (Turkey)
2004	1	6	Josh Childress	United States	Stanford University
2004	1	17	Josh Smith	United States	Oak Hill Academy
2004	2	34	Donta Smith	United States	Southeastern Illinois College
2004	2	37	Royal Ivey	United States	University of Texas at Austin
2004	2	42	Viktor Sanikidze	Georgia	JDA Dijon (France)
2003	1	21	Boris Diaw	France	Pau-Orthez (France)
2003	2	37	Travis Hansen	United States	Brigham Young University
2002	2	36	David Andersen	Australia/Denmark	Kinder Bologna (Italy)
2001	1	3	Pau Gasol	Spain	FC Barcelona (Spain)
2001	2	33	Terence Morris	United States	University of Maryland
2000	1	6	DerMarr Johnson	United States	University of Cincinnati
2000	2	40	Hanno Möttölä	Finland	University of Utah
2000	2	57	Scoonie Penn	United States	Ohio State University
1999	1	10	Jason Terry	United States	University of Arizona
1999	1	17	Cal Bowdler	United States	Old Dominion University
1999	1	20	Dion Glover	United States	Georgia Institute of Technology
1999	1	27	Jumaine Jones	United States	University of Georgia
2018	2	52	Roberto Bergersen	United States	Boise State university
1998	1	20	Roshown McLeod	United States	Duke University
1998	2	49	Cory Carr	United States	Texas Tech University
1997	1	22	Ed Gray	United States	University of California, Berkeley
1997	2	49	Alain Digbeu	France	ASVEL Villeurbanne (France)
1997	2	50	Chris Crawford	United States	Marquette University
1996	1	28	Priest Lauderdale	United States	Central State University
1995	1	16	Alan Henderson	United States	Indiana University Bloomington
1995	2	42	Donnie Boyce	United States	University of Colorado
1995	2	45	Troy Brown	United States	Providence College
1995	2	57	Cuonzo Martin	United States	Purdue University
1994	2	34	Gaylon Nickerson	United States	Northwestern Oklahoma State University
1993	1	15	Doug Edwards	United States	Florida State University
1993	2	40	Rich Manning	United States	University of Washington
1992	1	10	Adam Keefe	United States	Stanford University
1992	2	38	Elmer Bennett	United States	University of Notre Dame
1991	1	9	Stacey Augmon	United States	University of Nevada, Las Vegas
1991	1	15	Anthony Avent	United States	Seton Hall University
1991	2	30	Rodney Monroe	United States	North Carolina State University
1990	1	10	Rumeal Robinson	Jamaica/United States	University of Michigan
1990	2	36	Trevor Wilson	United States	University of California, Los Angeles
1990	2	41	Steve Bardo	United States	University of Illinois at Urbana–Champaign
1989	1	23	Roy Marble	United States	University of Iowa
1989	2	49	Haywoode Workman	United States	Oral Roberts University
1988	2	44	Anthony Taylor	United States	University of Oregon
1988	3	54	Jorge González	Argentina	Gimnasia de La Plata (Argentina)
1988	3	68	Darryl Middleton	United States	Baylor University
1987	1	21	Dallas Comegys	United States	DePaul University
1987	2	42	Terrance Bailey	United States	Wagner College
1987	2	44	Terry Coner	United States	University of Alabama
1987	3	67	Song Tao	China	
1987	4	90	Fanis Christodoulou	Greece	Panionios (Greece)
1987	5	113	José Antonio Montero	Spain	Joventut Badalona (Spain)
1987	6	136	Riccardo Morandotti	Italy	Auxilium Pallacanestro Torino (Italy)
1987	7	159	Franjo Arapović	Yugoslavia (Croatia)	KK Cibona (Yugoslavia)
1986	1	19	Billy Thompson	United States	University of Louisville
1986	2	32	Cedric Henderson	United States	University of Georgia
1986	2	40	Augusto Binelli	Italy	Virtus Pallacanestro Bologna (Italy)
1986	2	42	Ron Kellogg	United States	University of Kansas
1986	3	65	Dave Hoppen	United States	University of Nebraska–Lincoln
1986	3	70	Jim Les	United States	Bradley University
1986	4	88	Efrem Winters	United States	University of Illinois at Urbana–Champaign
1986	5	111	Nicky Jones	United States	Virginia Commonwealth University
1986	6	134	Alexander Volkov	Soviet Union (Ukraine)	Budivelnik Kiev (Soviet Union)
1986	7	157	Valeri Tikhonenko	Soviet Union (Russia)	PBC CSKA Moscow (Soviet Union)
1985	1	5	Jon Koncak	United States	Southern Methodist University
1985	2	41	Lorenzo Charles	United States	North Carolina State University
1985	3	59	Sedric Toney	United States	University of Dayton
1985	4	77	Arvydas Sabonis	Soviet Union (Lithuania)	Žalgiris Kaunas (Soviet Union)
1985	4	84	John Battle	United States	Rutgers University
1985	5	100	Larry Hampton	United States	Hampton University
1985	6	123	Tony Duckett	United States	Lafayette College
1985	7	146	Bob Ferry	United States	Harvard University
1984	1	11	Kevin Willis	United States	Michigan State University
1984	3	58	Bobby Parks	United States	Memphis State University
1984	4	81	Dickie Beal	United States	University of Kentucky
1984	5	104	Terry Martin	United States	Northeast Louisiana University
1984	6	127	Jim Master	United States	University of Kentucky
1984	7	150	Vince Martello	United States	Florida State University
1984	8	173	Robert Brown	United States	Long Island University
1984	9	195	Fred Brown	United States	Georgetown University
1984	10	217	Doug Mills	United States	Hofstra University
1983	2	31	Glenn Rivers	United States	Marquette University
1983	3	58	John Pinone	United States	Villanova University
1983	4	81	Harry Kelly	United States	Texas Southern University
1983	5	104	Charles Jones	United States	University of Oklahoma
1983	6	127	Tom Bethea	United States	University of Richmond
1983	7	150	Lex Drum	United States	University of Alabama at Birmingham
1983	8	173	George Thomas		Georgia Institute of Technology
1983	9	195	Wil Kotchery	United States	Rutgers University
1983	10	216	Ronnie Carr	United States	Western Carolina University
1982	1	10	Keith Edmonson	United States	Purdue University
1982	3	56	Joe Kopicki	United States	University of Detroit
1982	5	102	Mark Hall	United States	University of Minnesota
1982	6	126	Jay Bruchak	United States	Mount St. Mary's University
1982	7	148	Horace Wyatt	United States	Clemson University
1982	8	172	James Ratiff	United States	Howard University
1982	9	194	Pierre Bland	United States	Elizabeth City State University
1982	10	216	Ronnie McAdoo	United States	Old Dominion University
1981	1	4	Al Wood	United States	University of North Carolina
1981	2	38	Clyde Bradshaw	United States	DePaul University
1981	3	52	Rudy Macklin	United States	Louisiana State University
1981	4	75	Kevin Figaro	United States	University of Southwestern Louisiana
1981	5	98	Steve Krafscisin	United States	University of Iowa
1981	6	121	Darryl Warwick	United States	Hampton University
1981	7	144	Kevin Vesey	United States	Iona College
1981	8	167	Gilbert Salinas		University of Notre Dame
1981	9	189	Howard Thompkins		Wagner College
1981	10	209	Mike Frazier		Georgetown University
1980	1	18	Don Collins	United States	Washington State University
1980	2	28	Craig Shelton	United States	Georgetown University
1980	5	110	Mike Doyle		University of South Carolina
1980	6	133	Mike Zagardo		George Washington University
1980	7	156	Charles Hightower		Dillard University
1980	9	195	Stanley Lamb		College of Steubenville
1979	2	35	James Bradley	United States	Memphis State University
1979	2	38	Larry Wilson		Nicholls State University
1979	3	57	Don Marsh		Franklin & Marshall College
1979	5	101	Kendal Pinder	Bahamas	North Carolina State University
1979	6	121	Dwight Williams		Gardner–Webb College
1979	7	141	Tim Waterman		St. Bonaventure University
1979	8	160	John Goedeke		University of Maryland, Baltimore County
1979	9	178	Cedric Oliver		Hamilton College
1979	10	196	Chad Nelson		Drake University
1978	1	10	Butch Lee	Puerto Rico	Marquette University
1978	1	16	Jack Givens	United States	University of Kentucky
1978	2	25	Rick Wilson	United States	University of Louisville
1978	3	54	Steve Grant		Manhattan College
1978	5	98	Chris Potter		College of the Holy Cross
1978	6	120	Gerald Glover		Howard University
1978	7	141	Jim DeWeese		Gonzaga University
1978	8	160	Ed Murphy		Merrimack College
1978	9	177	Maurice Robinson		West Virginia University
1978	10	192	Marshall Lester		Florida Southern College
1977	1	14	Tree Rollins	United States	Clemson University
1977	3	48	Sam Smith	United States	University of Nevada, Las Vegas
1977	3	49	Eddie Johnson	United States	Auburn University
1977	4	70	Dave Bormann		Gardner–Webb College
1977	5	92	Bill Gordon		University of Tennessee at Chattanooga
1977	6	114	Calvin Crews		University of Southwestern Louisiana
1977	7	135	James Holliman		Arizona State University
1977	8	155	Vern Thompson		Brigham Young University
1976	1	9	Armond Hill	United States	Princeton University
1976	2	28	Bob Carrington	United States	Boston College
1976	3	46	Larry Cooke		Virginia Polytechnic Institute and State University
1976	4	53	Tom Barker	United States	University of Hawaiʻi at Mānoa
1976	5	70	Ron Davis	United States	Washington State University
1976	5	82	Connie White		University of California, Berkeley
1976	6	88	Pete Padgett	United States	University of Nevada, Reno
1976	7	106	Carl Gerlach	United States	Kansas State University
1976	8	124	Doug Terry		University of Utan
1976	9	142	Bob Kovach		San Diego State University
1976	10	159	Mike Dickerson		University of South Florida
1975	1	1	David Thompson	United States	North Carolina State University
1975	1	3	Marvin Webster	United States	Morgan State University
1975	2	19	Bill Willoughby	United States	Dwight Morrow High School
1975	4	57	Monte Towe	United States	North Carolina State University
1975	5	75	Wilbur Holland	United States	University of New Orleans
1975	6	93	Danny Williams		University of Mississippi
1975	7	111	Gus Johnson		Winona State College
1975	8	129	Oscar Jackson		Duquesne University
1975	9	146	Dave Schlesser		Morningside College
1975	10	162	Vic Kelly		University of Hawaiʻi at Mānoa
1974	1	7	Tom Henderson	United States	University of Hawaiʻi at Mānoa
1974	1	10	Mike Sojourner	United States	University of Utah
1974	2	25	John Drew	United States	Gardner–Webb College
1974	3	43	Darrell Elston	United States	University of North Carolina
1974	4	61	Ed Palubinskas	Australia	Louisiana State University
1974	5	79	Tyrone Medley		University of Utah
1974	6	97	Sam Hervey		Southern Methodist University
1974	7	115	Greg Lee	United States	University of California, Los Angeles
1974	8	133	Bill Butler	United States	University of Louisville
1974	9	151	Lon Kruger	United States	Kansas State University
1974	10	168	Brendy Lee		University of Nebraska–Lincoln
1973	1	9	Dwight Jones	United States	University of Houston
1973	1	10	John Brown	United States	University of Missouri
1973	2	27	Tom Ingelsby	United States	Villanova University
1973	3	36	Ted Manakas		Princeton University
1973	3	45	Leonard Gray	United States	California State University, Long Beach
1973	4	62	James Brown		Harvard University
1973	5	79	Dave Winfield	United States	University of Minnesota
1973	6	96	John Williamson	United States	New Mexico State University
1973	7	113	Pete Harris		Stephen F. Austin State University
1973	8	130	Tim Dominey		Valdosta State University
1972	2	21	Steve Bracey	United States	University of Tulsa
1972	4	55	Reggie Bird		Princeton University
1972	5	71	Bob Lackey	United States	Marquette University
1972	6	88	Randy Knoll		Marshall University
1972	7	105	Billy Pleas		University of Detroit
1972	8	121	Oscar Evans		Butler University
1972	9	136	Larry Strozier		Morehouse College
1972	10	149	Jim Clesson		University of Tulsa
1972	11	160	Charles Allen		Texas Southern University
1972	12	169	James Green		Paine College
1971	1	5	George Trapp	United States	California State University, Long Beach
1971	2	22	Ted McClain	United States	Tennessee State University
1971	3	39	Jeff Halliburton	United States	Drake University
1971	4	56	Jim Welch		University of Houston
1971	6	90	Willie Humes		University of Idaho
1971	7	107	Mike Jordan		Savannah State University
1971	8	124	Jim Smith		Kentucky Wesleyan College
1971	9	140	Ernie Fleming		Jacksonville University
1971	10	156	Ron Rippitoe		David Lipscomb College
1971	11	172	Levi Wyatt		Alcorn State University
1971	12	186	Roger Moore		Columbus State University
1971	13	198	Ed Jenkins		Michigan Lutheran High School
1970	1	3	Pete Maravich	United States	Louisiana State University
1970	1	14	John Vallely	United States	University of California, Los Angeles
1970	2	31	Dan Hester	United States	Louisiana State University
1970	4	65	Fred Davis		Howard Payne University
1970	5	82	Bob Riley		Mount St. Mary's University
1970	6	99	Dave Parker		Windham College
1970	7	116	John Shinall		Jackson State University
1970	8	133	Herb White	United States	University of Georgia
1970	9	150	Larry Jackson		Sul Ross State University
1970	10	167	Manuel Raga	Mexico	Varese (Italy)
1970	11	182	Dino Meneghin	Italy	Varese (Italy)
1969	1	10	Butch Beard	United States	University of Louisville
1969	2	25	Wally Anderzunas	United States	Creighton University
1969	4	53	Billy Hann		University of Tennessee
1969	4	55	Don Griffin		Stanford University
1969	5	67	Mike Mitchell		West Texas State University
1969	6	81	Guy Mackner		South Dakota State University
1969	7	95	Bob Bundy		Vanderbilt University
1969	8	109	Bob Christian	United States	Grambling College
1969	9	123	Pete Gayeska		University of Massachusetts Amherst
1969	10	137	Dick Stewart		Rutgers University
1969	11	151	Loran Bracci		San Fernando Valley State College
1969	12	164	Dave Jones		La Verne College
1969	13	176	Dick Barton		University of California, Riverside
1969	14	185	Mike Dahl		Oglethorpe University
1969	15	193	Norm Carmichael		University of Virginia
1969	16	199	Buddy Cornelius		Jacksonville State University
1969	17	205	John Tolmie		United States Naval Academy
1969	18	210	Cliff Parsons		United States Air Force Academy
1969	19	214	Grady O'Malley		Manhattan College
1969	20	217	Carl Rodwell	Australia	University of California, Riverside
1968	1	13	Skip Harlicka	United States	University of South Carolina
1968	4	47	Bob Warren	United States	Vanderbilt University
1968	5	61	Rusty Parker		University of Miami
1968	6	75	Phil Wagner	United States	Georgia Institute of Technology
1968	7	89	Oscar Smith		Elizabeth City State University
1968	8	103	Marin Baietti		Manhattan College
1968	9	117	Mack Daughtry	United States	Albany State University
1968	10	131	Dwight Waller		Tennessee State University
1968	11	144	Henry Watkins		Tennessee State University
1968	12	157	Bill Harris		Texas Western College
1968	13	169	Frank Standard		University of South Carolina
1968	14	180	George Hicker		Syracuse University
1968	15	188	Bernie Foster		Point Loma Nazarene University
1968	16	196	Terry Allerton		Baldwin Wallace College

== As St. Louis Hawks (1955–1967) ==
Year	Round	Pick	Name	Nationality	From
1967	1	8	Tom Workman		Seattle University
1967	3	25	Bob Verga		Duke University
1967	4	37	Wesley Bialosuknia		University of Connecticut
1967	5	49	Mike Wittman		University of Miami
1967	6	61	John Morrison		Canisius College
1967	7	73	Carl Fuller		Bethune-Cookman College
1967	8	85	Arvesta Kelly		Lincoln University (Missouri)
1967	9	96	Ed Biedenbach		North Carolina State University
1967	10	107	Rich Falkenbrush		Saint Michael's College
1966	1	4	Lou Hudson	United States	University of Minnesota
1966	2	14	Dick Snyder	United States	Davidson College
1966	3	24	Tommy Kron	United States	University of Kentucky
1966	4	34	Bob McIntyre		St. John's University
1966	5	44	Dick Nemelka		Brigham Young University
1966	6	54	Lonnie Wright		Colorado State University
1966	7	63	Jay Neary		University of North Carolina at Wilmington
1966	8	72	Brian Williams		Xavier University
1966	9	79	Albie Grant		Long Island University
1966	10	86	Don Yates		University of Minnesota
1966	11	93	Curt Gammell		Pacific Lutheran University
1966	12	99	Lonnie Lynn		Wilberforce University
1966	13	102	Nick Aloi		Bowling Green State University
1966	14	104	Ollie Carter		University of San Francisco
1966	15	106	Paul Long		Wake Forest University
1966	16	108	Eddie Jackson		Bradley University
1965	1	6	Jim Washington	United States	Villanova University
1965	3	23	Ken McIntyre		St. John's University
1965	4	32	Lynn Nance	United States	University of Washington
1965	5	41	Theodore Werner		Washington State University
1965	6	50	John Rambo		California State University, Long Beach
1965	7	58	Terry Kunze		University of Minnesota
1965	8	66	Cincinnatus Powell		University of Portland
1965	9	72	Leroy Walker		Utah State University
1965	10	78	Spencer Carlson		Baylor University
1965	11	84	Weldon Kytle		Cleveland State University
1965	12	90	Elton McGriff		Creighton University
1965	13	95	Mel Northway		University of Minnesota
1965	14	99	Terry Page		University of Detroit
1965	15	103	George Pomey		University of Michigan
1965	16	107	Bob Tolan		Eastern Kentucky University
1964	1	5	Jeff Mullins	United States	Duke University
1964	2	10	Paul Silas	United States	Creighton University
1964	3	22	Art Becker	United States	Arizona State University
1964	4	31	Willie Murrell	United States	Kansas State University
1964	5	40	John Tresvant	United States	Seattle University
1964	6	49	Ernest Brock		Virginia State University
1964	7	58	Maurice McHartley		North Carolina Agricultural and Technical State University
1964	8	67	Kendall Rhine		Rice University
1964	9	74	Darel Carrier		Western Kentucky University
1964	10	81	Frank Stephens		Virginia State University
1964	11	88	Gerald Govan		St. Mary of the Plains College
1964	12	92	Warren Sutton		Sir George Williams University
1964	13	95	Cecil Tuttle		Georgetown College (KY)
1964	14	97	Bill Blair		Virginia Military Institute
1964	15	99	Al Cech		University of Detroit
1963	1	5	Gerry Ward	United States	Boston College
1963	2	14	Leland Mitchell	United States	Mississippi State University
1963	2	17	Kenny Saylors	United States	Arkansas Polytechnic College
1963	3	23	Bill Burwell		University of Illinois at Urbana–Champaign
1963	4	32	Waite Bellamy		Florida Agricultural and Mechanical University
1963	5	41	Tony Yates		University of Cincinnati
1963	6	50	Al Santio		University of Maryland
1963	7	59	Ken Rohloff		North Carolina State University
1963	8	67	Harold Strothers		Texas A&M University
1963	9	72	Frank Davis		Oklahoma Christian University
1963	10	75	Carl Ritter		Southeast Missouri State College
1963	11	77	Marv Straw		Iowa State University
1963	12	79	Hugh Evans		North Carolina Agricultural and Technical State University
1963	13	81	Gary McFarland		Central Missouri State University
1962	1	3	Zelmo Beaty	United States	Prairie View A&M College
1962	2	10	Bob Duffy		Colgate University
1962	3	19	Charlie Hardnett		Grambling College
1962	4	26	Chico Vaughn		Southern Illinois University Carbondale
1962	4	28	Jerry Grote		Loyola University of Los Angeles
1962	5	37	Tom Hatton		University of Dayton
1962	6	46	Jay Carty		Oregon State University
1962	7	55	Bob McAteer		La Salle University
1962	8	63	Terry Ball		Washington State University
1962	9	72	Marvin Trotman		Elizabeth City State University
1962	10	81	Charlie Sells		Washington State University
1962	11	87	Tom Chappelle		University of Maine
1962	12	91	John Caveny		Le Moyne College
1962	13	94	Jerry Carlton		University of Arkansas
1962	14	96	Wilky Gilmore		University of Colorado
1962	15	98	Dave Ricerto		University of Rhode Island
1962	16	100	Wally Roundsville		California Institute of Technology
1961	1	8	Cleo Hill	United States	Winston-Salem State University
1961	2	16	Ron Horn	United States	Indiana University Bloomington
1961	3	30	Tom Chilton		East Tennessee State University
1961	4	39	Gus Guydon		Drake University
1961	5	48	John Berberich		University of California, Los Angeles
1961	6	57	Bob McDonald		University of Maryland
1961	7	66	Charles Riley		Winston-Salem State University
1961	8	75	Gene Velloff		Doane College
1961	9	82	Herbert Gray		North Carolina Agricultural and Technical State University
1961	10	90	Tom Faszholz		Concordia Seminary (Missouri)
1961	11	98	Dick Kepley		University of North Carolina
1961	12	101	Jackie Crawford		Centenary College of Louisiana
1961	13	104	Howard Stacy		University of Louisville
1960	1	6	Lenny Wilkens	United States	Providence College
1960	2	14	Frank Radovich		Indiana University Bloomington
1960	3	22	Fred LaCour		University of San Francisco
1960	4	30	Horace Walker		Michigan State University
1960	5	38	Jimmy Darrow		Bowling Green State University
1960	6	46	York Larese		University of North Carolina
1960	7	54	Bob Sims		Pepperdine University
1960	8	61	Don Curry		Mississippi Southern College
1960	9	68	Bob Castanada		Rockhurst University
1960	10	74	Americus John-Lewis		University of Iowa
1960	11	79	Dick Davies		Louisiana State University
1960	12	84	Bob Wilkinson		Indiana University Bloomington
1960	13	87	Ed Smallwood		Evansville College
1959	T		Bob Ferry	United States	Saint Louis University
1959	2	12	Al Seiden		St. John's University
1959	2	13	Cal Ramsey		New York University
1959	3	21	Hank Stein		Xavier University
1959	4	29	Lee Harman		Oregon State University
1959	5	37	Nick Mantis		Northwestern University
1959	6	45	Mike Moran		Marquette University
1959	7	53	Orby Arnold		Memphis State University
1959	8	59	Willie Merriwether		Purdue University
1959	9	65	Lou Pucillo		North Carolina State University
1959	10	71	Ron Loneski		University of Kansas
1959	11	77	John Barnhill		Tennessee State University
1958	1	6	Dave Gambee	United States	Oregon State University
1958	2	14	Hub Reed	United States	Oklahoma City University
1958	3	22	Wayne Embry	United States	Miami University
1958	4	30	Julius Peques		University of Pittsburgh
1958	5	38	Rick Herrscher		Southern Methodist University
1958	6	46	John Crawford		Iowa State University
1958	7	54	Ken Sidle		Ohio State University
1958	8	62	Bruno Boin		University of Washington
1958	9	68	Tink Van Patton		Temple University
1958	10	73	James Purcell		Coe College
1958	11	77	Don Klein		Rockhurst University
1958	12	81	Joe Buckhalter		Tennessee State University
1957	1	4	Win Wilfong	United States	Memphis State College
1957	2	12	Jim Palmer		University of Dayton
1957	3	20	John Smyth		University of Notre Dame
1957	4	28	Hank Nowak		Canisius College
1957	5	36	Al Rochelle		Vanderbilt University
1957	6	44	Raymond Downs		University of Texas at Austin
1957	7	52	Mason Pope		Kentucky Wesleyan College
1957	8	59	Bill Darragh		University of Louisville
1957	9	66	Calvin Grosscup		Tulane University
1957	10	72	Bobby Mills		Southern Methodist University
1957	11	77	Gerald Dreier		Macalester College
1957	12	80	Bob Seitz		North Carolina State University
1957	13	82	Ed Romanoff		University of Oregon
1957	14	83	Lavelle Langston		Northwestern State College
1956	1	2	Bill Russell	United States	University of San Francisco
1956			Wally Choice		Indiana University Bloomington
1956			Darrell Floyd		Furman University
1956			Robin Freeman		Ohio State University
1956			Arthur Helms		University of Houston
1956			Ed Huse		University of Wyoming
1956			Julius McCoy		Michigan State University
1956			Junior Morgan		Duke University
1956			Willie Naulls	United States	University of California, Los Angeles
1956			Hershel Pederson		Brigham Young University
1956			Dave Plunkett		University of Cincinnati
1956			Jim Reed		Texas Tech University
1956			Norm Stewart	United States	University of Missouri
1956			Morris Taft		University of California, Los Angeles
1955	1	1	Dick Ricketts		Duquesne University
1955	2	7	Jack Stephens		University of Notre Dame
1955	3	15	Al Ferrari		Michigan State University
1955	4	23	Burdette Haldorson	United States	University of Colorado
1955	5	31	Bill Bagley		Saint Mary's College of California
1955			Harvey Babetch		Bradley University
1955			Dick Cable		University of Wisconsin–Madison
1955			Lynn Cole		Creighton University
1955			Joe Fitt		University of Scranton
1955			Charles Hoxie		Niagara University
1955			Ed O'Connor		Manhattan College
1955			Bill Reigel		McNeese State University
1955			Dick Welsh		University of Southern California

== As Milwaukee Hawks (1952–1954) ==
Year	Round	Pick	Name	Nationality	From
1954	1	2	Bob Pettit	United States	Louisiana State University
1954	2	11	Bob Mattick		Oklahoma A&M University
1954	3	20	Walt Walowac		Marshall College
1954	4	29	Phil Martin		University of Toledo
1954	5	38	Paul Ebert		Ohio State University
1954	6	47	Bob Carney		Bradley University
1954	7	56	Alan Kelley		University of Kansas
1954	8	65	Dick Nunneley		University of Tulsa
1954	9	74	Hal Cervini		Tulane University
1954	10	82	Joe Bertrand		University of Notre Dame
1954	11	91	Jerry Domerschick		City College of New York
1954	12	97	Ron Weisner		University of Wisconsin–Madison
1953	1	2	Bob Houbregs	Canada	University of Washington
1953			Irv Bemoras		University of Illinois at Urbana–Champaign
1953			Bill Bolger		Georgetown University
1953			Paul Brandt		Columbia University
1953			Joe Cipriano		University of Washington
1953			Gene Dyker		DePaul University
1953			Eddie O'Brien		Seattle University
1953			John O'Brien		Seattle University
1953			Bob Rousey		Kansas State University
1953			Darrell Tucker		Utah State University
1952	1	1	Mark Workman		West Virginia University
1952			Pete Brewster		Purdue University
1952			Roger Johnson		University of Arizona
1952			George McLeod		Texas Christian University
1952			Eddie Miller		Syracuse University
1952			Ab Nicholas		University of Wisconsin–Madison
1952			Dick Retherford		Baldwin-Wallace College
1952			John Snee		Clemson University
1952			Jim Tackett		University of New Mexico
1952			Coyt Vance		Mississippi State University
1952			Bobby Watson		University of Kentucky

== As Tri-Cities Blackhawks (1950–1951) ==
Year	Round	Pick	Name	From
1951	1	2	Mel Hutchins	Brigham Young University
1951	2	11	Bill Gossett	Colorado State University
1951	3	21	Ron Bontemps	Beloit College
1951	4	31	Jim Slaughter	University of South Carolina
1951	5	41	Bob Sakel	University of Evansville
1951	6	51	John Rennicke	Drake University
1951	7	61	Bob Ambler	University of Arkansas
1951	8	71	Aaron Preece	Bradley University
1951	9	79	Wayne Tucker	University of Colorado
1951	10	83	John DeWitt	Texas A&M University
1950	1	3	Bob Cousy	College of the Holy Cross
1950	2		Ed Gayda	Washington State University
1950	3		Clarence Brannum	Kansas State University
1950	4		Paul Hicks	Eastern Kentucky University
1950	5	51	Cal Christensen	University of Toledo
1950	6		Bob Anderson	Loyola College Maryland
1950	7		Bill Erickson	University of Illinois at Urbana–Champaign
1950	8		Loy Doty	University of Wyoming
1950	9	99	Nate DeLong	University of Wisconsin–River Falls
1950	10		Keith Bloom	University of Wyoming
