= List of NBA players (D) =

This is a list of National Basketball Association players whose last names begin with D.

The list also includes players from the American National Basketball League (NBL), the Basketball Association of America (BAA), and the original American Basketball Association (ABA). All of these leagues contributed to the formation of the present-day NBA.

Individuals who played in the NBL prior to its 1949 merger with the BAA are listed in italics, as they are not traditionally listed in the NBA's official player registers.

== D ==
- Mike Dabich
- Pacôme Dadiet
- Harold Dahl
- Ed Dahler
- Quintin Dailey
- Samuel Dalembert
- Howie Dallmar
- Erick Dampier
- Louie Dampier
- Ed Dancker
- Bob Dandridge
- Antonio Daniels
- Dyson Daniels
- Erik Daniels
- Lloyd Daniels
- Marquis Daniels
- Mel Daniels
- Troy Daniels
- Sasha Danilovic
- N'Faly Dante
- Adrian Dantley
- Mike D'Antoni
- Pete Darcey
- Jimmy Darden
- Ollie Darden
- Yinka Dare
- Jesse Dark
- Nate Darling
- Rick Darnell
- Jimmy Darrow
- Tristan da Silva
- Luigi Datome
- Brad Daugherty
- Mack Daughtry
- Kornél Dávid
- Jermareo Davidson
- Bob Davies
- Brandon Davies
- Anthony Davis
- Antonio Davis
- Aubrey Davis
- Baron Davis
- Ben Davis
- Bill Davis
- Bob Davis
- Brad Davis
- Brian Davis
- Charles Davis
- Charlie Davis
- Dale Davis
- Deyonta Davis
- Dwight Davis
- Ed Davis
- Emanual Davis
- Glen Davis
- Harry Davis
- Hubert Davis
- Jim Davis
- Johnny Davis (b. 1955)
- Johnny Davis (b. 2002)
- Josh Davis
- Lee Davis
- Mark Davis (b. 1963)
- Mark Davis (b. 1973)
- Mel Davis
- Mickey Davis
- Mike Davis (b. 1946)
- Mike Davis (b. 1956)
- Monti Davis
- Paul Davis
- Ralph Davis
- Red Davis
- Ricky Davis
- Ron Davis
- Terence Davis
- Terry Davis
- Tyler Davis
- Walt Davis
- Walter Davis
- Warren Davis
- Willie Davis
- JD Davison
- Andre Dawkins
- Darryl Dawkins
- Johnny Dawkins
- Paul Dawkins
- Branden Dawson
- Eric Dawson
- Jamie Dawson
- Jimmy Dawson
- Tony Dawson
- Todd Day
- Austin Daye
- Darren Daye
- Darius Days
- Greg Deane
- Billy DeAngelis
- Les Deaton
- Rudy Debnar
- Dave DeBusschere
- Gabriel Deck
- Andrew DeClercq
- Nando de Colo
- Sergio de Larrea
- Dewayne Dedmon
- Don Dee
- Archie Dees
- Terry Dehere
- Pick Dehner
- Red Dehnert
- Bryce Dejean-Jones
- Sam Dekker
- Malcolm Delaney
- Javin DeLaurier
- Bison Dele
- Carlos Delfino
- Ángel Delgado
- Tony Delk
- Vinny Del Negro
- Matthew Dellavedova
- Nate DeLong
- Fennis Dembo
- Harold Dembo
- Larry Demic
- Egor Dëmin
- Dell Demps
- George Dempsey
- Luol Deng
- Kenny Dennard
- Blaine Denning
- Dexter Dennis
- RayJ Dennis
- Justin Dentmon
- Randy Denton
- Joe DePre
- Rod Derline
- DeMar DeRozan
- Marcus Derrickson
- Dave Deutsch
- Bill DeVenzio
- Corky Devlin
- Hal Devoll
- Bob DeWeese
- Hank DeZonie
- Malik Dia
- Moussa Diabaté
- Mamadi Diakite
- Derrick Dial
- Alpha Diallo
- Cheick Diallo
- Hamidou Diallo
- Boris Diaw
- Mohamed Diawara
- Yakhouba Diawara
- Guillermo Diaz
- Gradey Dick
- Dan Dickau
- Kaniel Dickens
- Henry Dickerson
- Michael Dickerson
- Clyde Dickey
- Derrek Dickey
- Dick Dickey
- Hunter Dickinson
- John Dickson
- Whitey Dienelt
- Travis Diener
- Gorgui Dieng
- Ousmane Dieng
- Connie Dierking
- Coby Dietrick
- Bob Dietz
- Ernie DiGregorio
- Craig Dill
- Dwaine Dillard
- Mickey Dillard
- Bob Dille
- Rob Dillingham
- Hook Dillon
- Byron Dinkins
- Jackie Dinkins
- Harry Dinnel
- Bill Dinwiddie
- Spencer Dinwiddie
- Ike Diogu
- DeSagana Diop
- Terry Dischinger
- Fred Diute
- Vlade Divac
- Donte DiVincenzo
- Josh Dix
- Juan Dixon
- Earl Dodd
- Gus Doerner
- Michael Doleac
- Joe Dolhon
- Bob Doll
- James Donaldson
- Tre Donaldson
- Luka Dončić
- Bob Donham
- Billy Donovan
- Harry Donovan
- Keyon Dooling
- Aleksandar Đorđević
- Jacky Dorsey
- Joey Dorsey
- Ron Dorsey
- Tyler Dorsey
- Luguentz Dort
- Ayo Dosunmu
- Damyean Dotson
- Devon Dotson
- Quincy Douby
- Bruce Douglas
- John Douglas
- Leon Douglas
- Sherman Douglas
- Toney Douglas
- Chris Douglas-Roberts
- Sekou Doumbouya
- Sonny Dove
- Jerry Dover
- Zabian Dowdell
- Duck Dowell
- Bill Downey
- Glynn Downey
- Steve Downing
- Jeff Dowtin Jr.
- Danny Doyle
- Milton Doyle
- PJ Dozier
- Terry Dozier
- Goran Dragić
- Zoran Dragić
- Greg Dreiling
- Henri Drell
- Bryce Drew
- John Drew
- Larry Drew
- Larry Drew II
- Clyde Drexler
- Nate Driggers
- Terry Driscoll
- John Drish
- Bob Dro
- Predrag Drobnjak
- Ralph Drollinger
- Andre Drummond
- Beryl Drummond
- Chris Duarte
- Alex Ducas
- Paul DuCharme
- Dick Duckett
- Kevin Duckworth
- Charles Dudley
- Chris Dudley
- Jared Dudley
- Terry Duerod
- Bob Duffy (b. 1922)
- Bob Duffy (b. 1940)
- Jack Dugger
- Chris Duhon
- Duje Dukan
- David Duke Jr.
- Walter Dukes
- Joe Dumars
- Rich Dumas
- Richard Dumas
- Tony Dumas
- Andy Duncan
- Tim Duncan
- Mike Dunleavy Jr.
- Mike Dunleavy Sr.
- Kris Dunn
- Ryan Dunn
- Pat Dunn
- T. R. Dunn
- Dave Dupee
- Ronald Dupree
- Kevin Durant
- Jalen Duren
- John Duren
- Jarrett Durham
- Pat Durham
- Bill Durkee
- Bill Durkin
- Devin Durrant
- Ken Durrett
- Dennis DuVal
- Trevon Duval
- Jack Dwan
- AJ Dybantsa
- Craig Dykema
- Gene Dyker
- Bob Dykstra
- Jerome Dyson
