= Dupee =

Dupee is a surname. Notable people with the surname include:

- Caroline Dupee Wade (1857–1947), American painter
- Dave Dupee (1916–2008), American professional basketball player
- F. W. Dupee (1904–1979), American literary critic
- Frank Dupee (1877–1956), American baseball player
- George Washington Dupee (1826–1897), American slave-turned-Baptist leader
- Kenneth Dupee Swan (1887–1970), American photographer
- Leonard Dupee White (1891–1958), American historian
- Michael George Dupée (born 1966), American game show contestant and author
