= Donald Curry (disambiguation) =

Donald Curry is a former boxer.

Donald Curry may also refer to:

- Don Curry, actor and comedian
- Donald Curry, Baron Curry of Kirkharle, businessman and member of House of Lords
- Don Curry (baseball), played in 1941 Chicago Cubs season
- Don Curry (basketball) in Atlanta Hawks draft history

== See also ==
- Donald Currie (disambiguation)
- Donald Rusk Currey, American professor of geography
