= Ed Smith (basketball) =

American basketball player

Personal information
- Born: July 5, 1929 West Jefferson, Ohio, U.S.
- Died: November 26, 1998 (aged 69)
- Listed height: 6 ft 6 in (1.98 m)
- Listed weight: 180 lb (82 kg)

Career information
- College: Harvard (1948–1951)
- NBA draft: 1951: 1st round, 6th overall pick
- Drafted by: New York Knicks
- Playing career: 1953–1954
- Position: Small forward
- Number: 14

Career history
- 1953–1954: New York Knicks
- Stats at NBA.com
- Stats at Basketball Reference

Edward Bernard Smith (July 5, 1929 – November 26, 1998) was an American professional basketball player for the New York Knicks of the National Basketball Association (NBA). He was drafted with the sixth pick in the first round of the 1951 NBA draft by the Knicks. He made his NBA debut in the 1953–54 NBA season and played in eleven games where he averaged 2.5 points per game and 2.4 rebounds per game.

== Career statistics ==
Legend
GP	Games played	GS	Games started	MPG	Minutes per game
FG%	Field goal percentage	3P%	3-point field goal percentage	FT%	Free throw percentage
RPG	Rebounds per game	APG	Assists per game	SPG	Steals per game
BPG	Blocks per game	PPG	Points per game	**Bold**	Career high

=== NBA ===
==== Regular season ====
Year	Team	GP	MPG	FG%	FT%	RPG	APG	PPG
1953–54	New York	12	10.6	.286	.538	2.7	.8	2.9
