= 1951 NBA draft =

Basketball player selection

General information
- Sport: Basketball
- Date: April 25, 1951
- Location: Park Sheraton Hotel (New York City, New York)

Overview
- 87 total selections in 12 rounds
- League: NBA
- Teams: 10
- First selection: Gene Melchiorre, Baltimore Bullets

The 1951 NBA draft was the fifth annual draft of the National Basketball Association (NBA). The draft was held on April 25, 1951, before the 1951–52 season. In this draft, ten remaining NBA teams took turns selecting amateur U.S. college basketball players. In each round, the teams selected in reverse order of their win–loss record in the previous season. The Tri-Cities Blackhawks participated in the draft, but relocated to Milwaukee and became the Milwaukee Hawks prior to the start of the season. The draft consisted of 12 rounds comprising 87 players selected. This draft was the league’s first, and along with the 2000 NBA Draft, one of only two to date, to produce no Naismith Memorial Basketball Hall of Fame players (excluding drafts with players not yet eligible).

== Draft selections and draftee career notes ==
Gene Melchiorre from Bradley University was selected first overall by the Baltimore Bullets. However, he never played in the NBA due to his involvement in a point shaving scandal while playing college basketball. Melchiorre would be joined by fellow Bradley teammates Bill Mann (the 21st pick of the draft) and Aaron Preece (the 72nd pick of the draft) in terms of players selected in this year's draft to never play in the NBA due to their involvement in the aforementioned point shaving scandal (other individuals involved and named at the time either went undrafted at the time, were already selected in previous drafts before this year, or were already disqualified from entering the draft this year due to the discovery at hand). Whitey Skoog from University of Minnesota was selected before the draft as Minneapolis Lakers' territorial pick.

== Key ==
Pos.	G	F	C
Position	Guard	Forward	Center

^{+}	Denotes player who has been selected for at least one All-Star Game
^{#}	Denotes player who has never appeared in an NBA regular-season or playoff game
^{~}	Denotes player who has been selected as Rookie of the Year

== Draft ==
Round	Pick	Player	Position	Nationality	Team	College
T	–	Whitey Skoog	G	United States	Minneapolis Lakers	Minnesota
1	1	Gene Melchiorre^{#}	G	United States	Baltimore Bullets	Bradley
1	2	Mel Hutchins^{+}^{~}	F/C	United States	Tri-Cities Blackhawks	Brigham Young
1	3	Marc Freiberger^{#}	C	United States	Indianapolis Olympians	Oklahoma
1	4	Zeke Sinicola	G	United States	Fort Wayne Pistons	Niagara
1	5	John McConathy	F	United States	Syracuse Nationals	Northwestern State
1	6	Ed Smith	F	United States	New York Knicks	Harvard
1	7	Ernie Barrett	G/F	United States	Boston Celtics	Kansas State
1	8	Sam Ranzino	G	United States	Rochester Royals	NC State
1	9	Don Sunderlage^{+}	G	United States	Philadelphia Warriors	Illinois
2	10	Jack Stone^{#}	G/F	United States	Baltimore Bullets	Kansas State
2	11	Bill Gossett^{#}	F/C	United States	Tri-Cities Blackhawks	Colorado A&M
2	12	Scotty Steagall^{#}	G	United States	Indianapolis Olympians	Millikin
2	13	Jack Kiley	G	United States	Fort Wayne Pistons	Syracuse
2	14	Don Savage	G/F	United States	Syracuse Nationals	Le Moyne
2	15	Roland Minson^{#}	G	United States	New York Knicks	Brigham Young
2	16	Bill Garrett^{#}	F	United States	Boston Celtics	Indiana
2	17	Ray Ragelis	F	United States	Rochester Royals	Northwestern
2	18	Mel Payton	G/F	United States	Philadelphia Warriors	Tulane
2	19	Lew Hitch	F/C	United States	Minneapolis Lakers	Kansas State

== Other picks ==
The following list includes other draft picks who have appeared in at least one NBA game.

Round	Pick	Player	Position	Nationality	Team	College
3	23	Jake Fendley	F	United States	Fort Wayne Pistons	Northwestern
3	24	Bato Govedarica	G	United States	Syracuse Nationals	DePaul
3	27	Fred Diute	G	United States	Rochester Royals	St. Bonaventure
4	31	Jim Slaughter	C	United States	Tri-Cities Blackhawks	South Carolina
4	32	Bill Tosheff^{~}	G	United States	Indianapolis Olympians	Indiana
4	37	Elmer Behnke	C	United States	Rochester Royals	Bradley
5	48	Mike Kearns	G	United States	Philadelphia Warriors	Princeton
6	51	John Rennicke	G	United States	Tri-Cities Blackhawks	Drake
6	55	Al McGuire	G/F	United States	New York Knicks	St. John's
6	56	James Luisi	G	United States	Boston Celtics	St. Francis (NY)
7	68	George Dempsey	G	United States	Philadelphia Warriors	King's (NY)
8	77	James Phelan	G	United States	Philadelphia Warriors	La Salle

== Notable undrafted players ==
These players were not selected in the 1951 draft, but played at least one game in the NBA.

Player	Pos.	Nationality	School/club team
John O'Boyle	G	United States	Colorado State

== See also ==
- List of first overall NBA draft picks
