= Donald Currie (disambiguation) =

Donald Currie (1825–1909), a British shipowner.

Donald Currie may also refer to:

- Don Currie (born 1934), New Zealand cricketer
- Donald Currie (field hockey) (born 1935), Australian field hockey player
- Donald Currie (1930–2014), grandson of the 5th of the Currie baronets

== See also ==
- Donald Curry (disambiguation)
- Donald Rusk Currey, American professor of geography
- Currie (surname)
