= Jack Stone =

Jack Stone may refer to:

== People ==
- Jack Stone (basketball), American basketball player
- Jack Stone (American football) (born 1936), American football player

== Other uses ==
- Lego Jack Stone, Lego theme
