= John O'Boyle =

American basketball player (1928–1984)

Personal information
- Born: March 7, 1928 New York City, New York, U.S.
- Died: March 30, 1984 (aged 56)
- Listed height: 6 ft 2 in (1.88 m)
- Listed weight: 185 lb (84 kg)

Career information
- College: Modesto JC (1947–1949); Colorado State (1949–1951)
- NBA draft: 1951: undrafted
- Position: Shooting guard
- Number: 3

Career history

Playing
- 1951–1952: Washington Capitols
- 1951–1952: Wilkes-Barre Barons
- 1952: Milwaukee Hawks

Coaching
- 1958–1959: LIU Brooklyn (freshman)
- 1959–1963: Stockton HS (assistant)
- 1963–19??: Stockton HS

Career highlights
- ABL champion (1951); All-Skyline Conference (1950)
- Stats at NBA.com
- Stats at Basketball Reference

John W. O'Boyle (March 7, 1928 – March 30, 1984) was an American professional basketball player. He played in five games for the Milwaukee Hawks of the National Basketball Association in 1952–53. O'Boyle recorded 21 points, 10 rebounds, and 5 assists in his brief career. He died on March 30, 1984, at the age of 56.

== Career statistics ==
=== NBA ===
Legend
GP	Games played	GS	Games started	MPG	Minutes per game
FG%	Field goal percentage	3P%	3-point field goal percentage	FT%	Free throw percentage
RPG	Rebounds per game	APG	Assists per game	SPG	Steals per game
BPG	Blocks per game	PPG	Points per game	**Bold**	Career high

==== Regular season ====
Year	Team	GP	MPG	FG%	FT%	RPG	APG	PPG
1952–53	Milwaukee	5	19.4	.308	.714	2.0	1.0	4.2
