= Bill Gossett =

American basketball player

Personal information
- Listed height: 6 ft 7 in (2.01 m)
- Listed weight: 190 lb (86 kg)

Career information
- College: Colorado State (1948–1951)
- NBA draft: 1951: 2nd round, 11th overall pick
- Drafted by: Tri-Cities Blackhawks
- Position: Forward / center
- Stats at Basketball Reference

Bill Gossett was an American professional basketball player. He was one of 1951's AAU Men's Basketball All-Americans and was also the eleventh pick in the 1951 NBA draft.
