= Elmer Behnke =

American basketball player (1929–2018)

Personal information
- Born: February 3, 1929 Rockford, Illinois, U.S.
- Died: May 25, 2018 (aged 89) Vestavia Hills, Alabama, U.S.
- Listed height: 6 ft 7 in (2.01 m)
- Listed weight: 210 lb (95 kg)

Career information
- High school: Marengo (Marengo, Illinois)
- College: Bradley (1947–1951)
- NBA draft: 1951: 4th round, 37th overall pick
- Drafted by: Rochester Royals
- Playing career: 1951–1952
- Position: Center

Career history
- 1951–1952: Milwaukee Hawks

Career highlights
- First-team All-MVC (1951)
- Stats at NBA.com
- Stats at Basketball Reference

Elmer H. Behnke (February 3, 1929 – May 25, 2018) was an American basketball player. Born in Rockford, Illinois, he played collegiately for Bradley University. He was selected by the Rochester Royals in the 4th round (35th pick overall) of the 1951 NBA draft. He played for the Milwaukee Hawks (1951–52) in the NBA for four games.

== Career statistics ==
Legend
GP	Games played	GS	Games started	MPG	Minutes per game
FG%	Field goal percentage	3P%	3-point field goal percentage	FT%	Free throw percentage
RPG	Rebounds per game	APG	Assists per game	SPG	Steals per game
BPG	Blocks per game	PPG	Points per game	**Bold**	Career high

=== NBA ===
==== Regular season ====
Year	Team	GP	MPG	FG%	FT%	RPG	APG	PPG
1951–52	Milwaukee	4	13.8	.273	.571	4.3	1.0	4.0
