= Caroline Dupee Wade =

American painter

- Born: 1857; Chicago, Illinois
- Died: April 1, 1947 (aged 89–90); Elmhurst, Illinois
- Known for: Painting

Caroline Dupee Wade (1857-1947) was an American painter. She taught at the Art Institute of Chicago and was featured prominently at the 1893 World's Columbian Exposition in Chicago, Illinois.

== Biography ==
Wade was born in 1857 in Chicago, Illinois. She attended the Art Institute of Chicago where she was taught by Henry F. Spread and Lawrence Carmichael Earle. In 1888 Wade travelled to Paris, France where she was taught by Gustave-Claude-Etienne Courtois and Jean-André Rixens at the Académie Colarossi.

Wade exhibited her work at the Palace of Fine Arts and the Illinois Building at the 1893 World's Columbian Exposition in Chicago, Illinois. She had ten paintings displayed in the Illinois Building, as well as being part of the decorating committee for that building.

Wade taught at the Art Institute of Chicago and was a member of the Art Students League of Chicago. She was a founding member of the Palette Club, along with Ida C. Haskell, Alice De Wolf Kellogg, Pauline Dohn Rudolph, and Marie Koupal Lusk.

She died on April 1, 1947, in Elmhurst, Illinois.

== Legacy ==
In 2012-2013 Wade was included in the Elmhurst Goes to the Fair exhibit at the Elmhurst History Museum.
