= John Rennicke =

American basketball player

Personal information
- Born: August 11, 1929 Aurora, Illinois, U.S.
- Died: December 9, 2007 (aged 78) Perham, Minnesota, U.S.
- Listed height: 6 ft 2 in (1.88 m)
- Listed weight: 185 lb (84 kg)

Career information
- High school: East Aurora (Aurora, Illinois)
- College: Drake (1947–1951)
- NBA draft: 1951: 6th round, 51st overall pick
- Drafted by: Tri-Cities Blackhawks
- Position: Guard

Career history
- 1951–1952: Elmira Colonels
- 1952: Milwaukee Hawks

Career highlights
- First team All-MVC (1950)
- Stats at NBA.com
- Stats at Basketball Reference

John William Rennicke (August 11, 1929 – December 9, 2007) was an American professional basketball player. He grew up in Aurora, Illinois, and played basketball for East Aurora High School, where he was later inducted into the Athletic Hall of Fame. After a successful collegiate career with Drake, Rennicke was selected in the sixth round 1951 NBA draft by the Tri-Cities Blackhawks. He played for the Milwaukee Hawks in only six games during the second half of the 1951–52 season. He also played for the Elmira Colonels in the American Basketball League in 1951–52 before retiring from professional basketball. Rennicke also played minor league baseball in the Chicago Cubs organization. Rennicke died in Minnesota in 2007.

== Career statistics ==
Legend
GP	Games played	GS	Games started	MPG	Minutes per game
FG%	Field goal percentage	3P%	3-point field goal percentage	FT%	Free throw percentage
RPG	Rebounds per game	APG	Assists per game	SPG	Steals per game
BPG	Blocks per game	PPG	Points per game	**Bold**	Career high

=== NBA ===
==== Regular season ====
Year	Team	GP	MPG	FG%	FT%	RPG	APG	PPG
1951–52	Milwaukee	6	9.0	.222	.333	1.5	.2	1.8
