= Ken Rohloff =

American basketball player

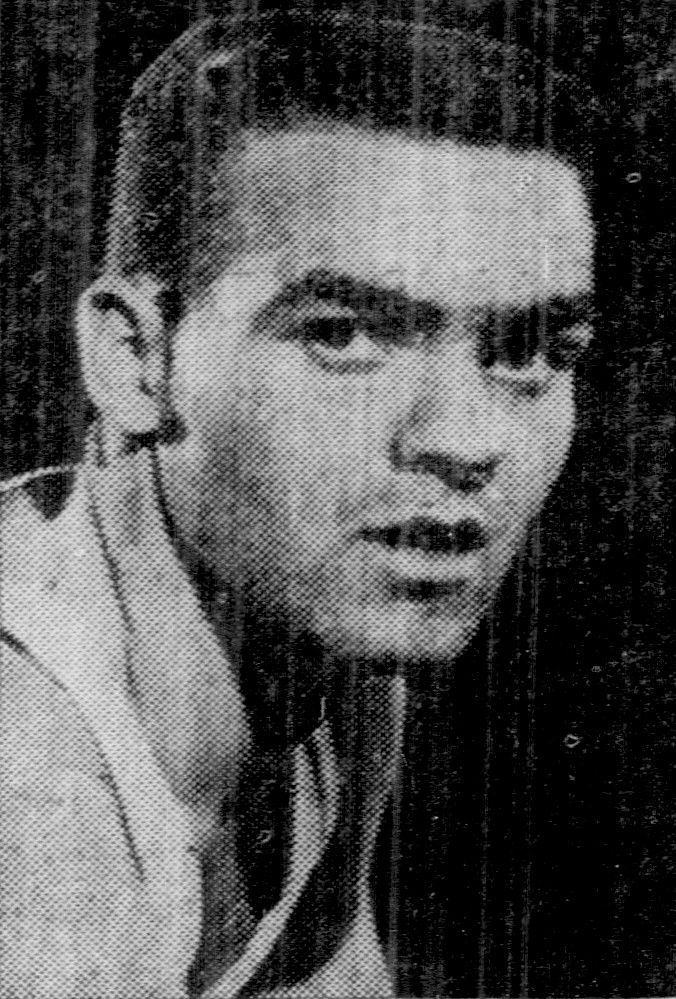
- Rohloff, circa 1963

Personal information
- Born: April 18, 1939 (age 87) Paterson, New Jersey, U.S.
- Listed height: 6 ft 0 in (1.83 m)
- Listed weight: 195 lb (88 kg)

Career information
- High school: St. John's (Paterson, New Jersey)
- College: NC State (1960–1963)
- NBA draft: 1963: 7th round, 59th overall pick
- Drafted by: St. Louis Hawks
- Playing career: 1963–1965
- Position: Point guard

Career history
- 1963–1965: Sunbury Mercuries
- 1964: St. Louis Hawks

Career highlights
- EPBL Rookie of the Year (1964); 2× Second-team All-ACC (1961, 1963)
- Stats at NBA.com
- Stats at Basketball Reference

Kenneth Lawrence Rohloff (born April 18, 1939) is an American former professional basketball player. He played the point guard position for the St. Louis Hawks of the National Basketball Association (NBA). Rohloff was drafted as the sixth pick in the seventh round of the 1963 NBA draft. He appeared in two games for the Hawks in the 1963–64 NBA season and recorded zero points, zero rebounds, and one assist.

Rohloff played for the Sunbury Mercuries of the Eastern Professional Basketball League (EPBL) from 1963 to 1965. He was named the EPBL Rookie of the Year in 1964.

== Career statistics ==
Legend
GP	Games played	GS	Games started	MPG	Minutes per game
FG%	Field goal percentage	3P%	3-point field goal percentage	FT%	Free throw percentage
RPG	Rebounds per game	APG	Assists per game	SPG	Steals per game
BPG	Blocks per game	PPG	Points per game	**Bold**	Career high

=== NBA ===
==== Regular season ====
Year	Team	GP	MPG	FG%	FT%	RPG	APG	PPG
1963–64	St. Louis	2	3.5	.000	–	.0	.5	.0
