= Grady O'Malley =

American basketball player and attorney (born 1948)

Personal information
- Born: April 25, 1948 (age 78) Boston, Massachusetts, U.S.
- Listed height: 6 ft 5 in (1.96 m)
- Listed weight: 205 lb (93 kg)

Career information
- High school: Saint Sebastian's School (Needham, Massachusetts)
- College: Manhattan (1966–1969)
- NBA draft: 1969: 19th round, 214th overall pick
- Drafted by: Atlanta Hawks
- Playing career: 1969–1970
- Position: Small forward
- Number: 12

Career history
- 1969–1970: Atlanta Hawks

Career NBA statistics
- Points: 50 (2.1 points per game)
- Rebounds: 26 (1.1 rebounds per game)
- Assists: 10 (0.4 assists per game)
- Stats at NBA.com
- Stats at Basketball Reference

Vincent Grady O'Malley (born April 25, 1948) is a retired American professional basketball player and a long-serving assistant United States attorney.

He was the 214th overall selection in the 19th round by the Atlanta Hawks in the 1969 National Basketball Association draft. He played in 24 games in his NBA career, and averaged 2.1 points per game and 1.1 rebounds per game. He was waived by the Hawks on February 1, 1970 after the team acquired Walt Bellamy from the Detroit Pistons. Prior to playing in the NBA, he starred at Manhattan College. He was inducted into the Manhattan College Hall of Fame in 2007.

Following his brief stint in the NBA, O'Malley attended law school and is currently an assistant United States attorney for the District of New Jersey.

== Education ==
O'Malley graduated with a bachelor of arts degree in political science from Manhattan College's College of Arts and Sciences in 1969. O'Malley graduated on the Dean's List. Following his year playing on the Atlanta Hawks, O'Malley attended Boston College School of Law in Newton, Massachusetts, where he worked with Professor Robert Berry to develop the nation's first sports law course. O'Malley obtained his Juris Doctor from Boston College School of Law in 1973.

== Career statistics ==
Legend
GP	Games played	GS	Games started	MPG	Minutes per game
FG%	Field goal percentage	3P%	3-point field goal percentage	FT%	Free throw percentage
RPG	Rebounds per game	APG	Assists per game	SPG	Steals per game
BPG	Blocks per game	PPG	Points per game	**Bold**	Career high

=== NBA ===
==== Regular season ====
Year	Team	GP	MPG	FG%	FT%	RPG	APG	PPG
1969–70	Atlanta	24	4.7	.350	.421	1.1	.4	2.1
