= Phil Martin (basketball) =

American basketball player (1928–2008)

Personal information
- Born: April 2, 1928 Jackson, Michigan, U.S.
- Died: June 24, 2008 (aged 80) Dallas, Texas, U.S.
- Listed height: 6 ft 3 in (1.91 m)
- Listed weight: 190 lb (86 kg)

Career information
- High school: Jackson (Jackson, Michigan)
- College: Toledo (1951–1954)
- NBA draft: 1954: 4th round, 29th overall pick
- Drafted by: Milwaukee Hawks
- Position: Small forward
- Number: 6

Career history
- 1954: Milwaukee Hawks

Career highlights
- 3× First-team All-MAC (1952–1954)
- Stats at NBA.com
- Stats at Basketball Reference

Phillip Roger Martin (April 2, 1928 – June 24, 2008) was a guard in the National Basketball Association. Martin was drafted in the Milwaukee Hawks in the fourth round of the 1954 NBA draft and played with the team for seven games early that season.

== Career statistics ==
Legend
GP	Games played	GS	Games started	MPG	Minutes per game
FG%	Field goal percentage	3P%	3-point field goal percentage	FT%	Free throw percentage
RPG	Rebounds per game	APG	Assists per game	SPG	Steals per game
BPG	Blocks per game	PPG	Points per game	**Bold**	Career high

=== NBA ===
==== Regular season ====
Year	Team	GP	MPG	FG%	FT%	RPG	APG	PPG
1954–55	Milwaukee	7	6.7	.263	1.000	1.4	.9	1.7
