= Fred Diute =

American basketball player

Personal information
- Born: January 9, 1929 Binghamton, New York, U.S.
- Died: July 19, 2004 (aged 75) Vero Beach, Florida, U.S.
- Listed height: 6 ft 3 in (1.91 m)
- Listed weight: 210 lb (95 kg)

Career information
- College: St. Bonaventure (1947–1951)
- NBA draft: 1951: 3rd round, 27th overall pick
- Drafted by: Rochester Royals
- Playing career: 1954–1959
- Position: Shooting guard
- Number: 4

Career history
- 1954: Milwaukee Hawks
- 1954–1955: Wilkes-Barre Barons
- 1955–1956: Scranton Miners
- 1958–1959: Hazleton Pros

Career highlights
- EPBL champion (1955)

Career NBA statistics
- Points: 11 (1.6 ppg)
- Rebounds: 13 (1.9 rpg)
- Assists: 4 (0.6 apg)
- Stats at NBA.com
- Stats at Basketball Reference

Fred Homer Diute (January 9, 1929 – July 19, 2004) was an American professional basketball player. Diute was selected in the 1951 NBA draft by the Rochester Royals after a collegiate career at St. Bonaventure. He played for the Milwaukee Hawks in 1954–55 and averaged 1.6 points, 1.9 rebounds and 0.6 assists per contest in 11 career games.

Diute played in the Eastern Professional Basketball League (EPBL) for the Wilkes-Barre Barons during the 1954–55 season, Scranton Miners during the 1955–56 season and Hazleton Pros during the 1958–59 season. He won an EPBL championship with the Barons in 1955.

== Career statistics ==
Legend
GP	Games played	GS	Games started	MPG	Minutes per game
FG%	Field goal percentage	3P%	3-point field goal percentage	FT%	Free throw percentage
RPG	Rebounds per game	APG	Assists per game	SPG	Steals per game
BPG	Blocks per game	PPG	Points per game	**Bold**	Career high

=== NBA ===
==== Regular season ====
Year	Team	GP	MPG	FG%	FT%	RPG	APG	PPG
1954–55	Milwaukee	7	10.3	.095	.583	1.9	.6	1.6
