= Dave Dupee =

American basketball player

Personal information
- Born: March 30, 1916 Earlville, Illinois, U.S.
- Died: November 18, 2008 (aged 92) Naples, Florida, U.S.
- Listed height: 6 ft 3 in (1.91 m)
- Listed weight: 185 lb (84 kg)

Career information
- High school: Freeport (Freeport, Illinois)
- College: Wisconsin (1936–1939)
- Position: Forward

Career history
- 1938: Oshkosh All-Stars

David Barnard Dupee (March 30, 1916 – November 18, 2008) was an American professional basketball player. He played in the National Basketball League in one game for the Oshkosh All-Stars during the 1938–39 season. In college, Dupee was an All-Big Ten Conference performer at Wisconsin, but transferred there after one year at Beloit College in which he played for the freshman basketball team.
