= Gene Dyker =

American basketball player (1930–1966)

Personal information
- Born: February 17, 1930 Chicago, Illinois, U.S.
- Died: January 24, 1966 (aged 35) Chicago, Illinois, U.S.
- Listed height: 6 ft 6 in (1.98 m)
- Listed weight: 225 lb (102 kg)

Career information
- High school: St. Patrick (Chicago, Illinois)
- College: DePaul (1950–1952)
- NBA draft: 1953: 5th round, 36th overall pick
- Drafted by: Milwaukee Hawks
- Position: Forward
- Number: 5

Career history
- 1953: Milwaukee Hawks
- Stats at NBA.com
- Stats at Basketball Reference

Eugene Walter Dyker (February 17, 1930 – January 24, 1966) was an American basketball forward in the National Basketball Association. He was drafted by the Milwaukee Hawks in the 1953 NBA draft and played with the team that season.

== Career statistics ==
Legend
GP	Games played	GS	Games started	MPG	Minutes per game
FG%	Field goal percentage	3P%	3-point field goal percentage	FT%	Free throw percentage
RPG	Rebounds per game	APG	Assists per game	SPG	Steals per game
BPG	Blocks per game	PPG	Points per game	**Bold**	Career high

=== NBA ===
==== Regular season ====
Year	Team	GP	MPG	FG%	FT%	RPG	APG	PPG
1953–54	Milwaukee	11	8.3	.231	.500	1.5	.5	1.5
