= New York Knicks draft history =

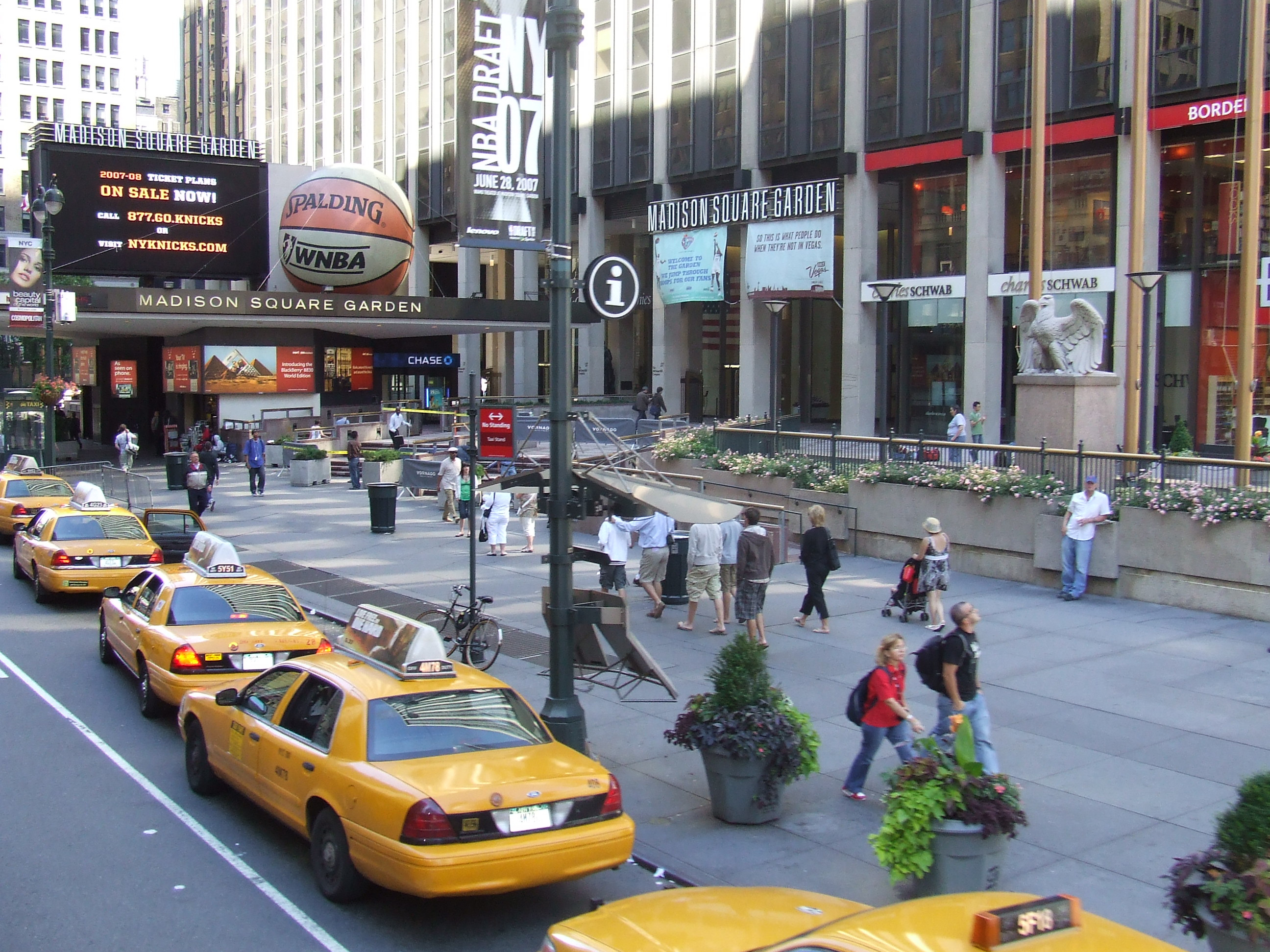
Madison Square Garden, the home of the Knicks, has also been the site of numerous NBA drafts.

This is a list of the New York Knicks' draft selections from the first and second rounds of the National Basketball Association (NBA) and the Basketball Association of America (BAA).

== Key ==
Abbreviation	Meaning	Abbreviation	Meaning
T	Territorial pick	(#)	Retired Knicks' Number

^	Denotes player who has been inducted to the Naismith Memorial Basketball Hall of Fame
*	Denotes player who has been selected for at least one All-Star Game and All-NBA Team
^{+}	Denotes player who has been selected for at least one All-Star Game
^{x}	Denotes player who has been selected for at least one All-NBA Team
^{#}	Denotes player who has never appeared in an NBA regular-season or playoff game

Position	G	Guard	PG	Point guard	SG	Shooting guard	F	Forward	SF	Small forward	PF	Power forward	C	Center

== Selections ==
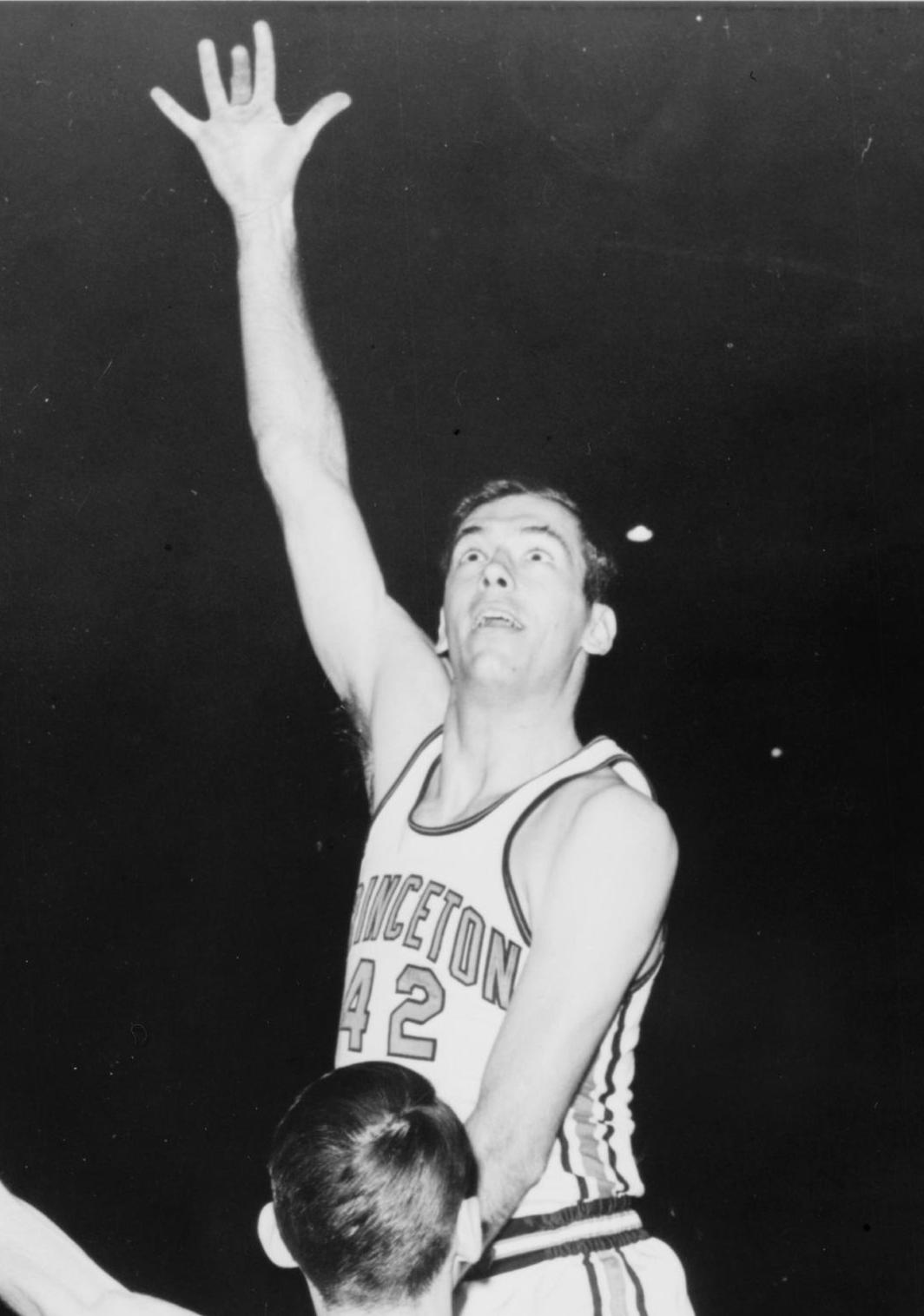
Bill Bradley was drafted by the Knicks in 1965, as a territorial pick, from Princeton University. He played on the 1970 and 1973 championship teams.

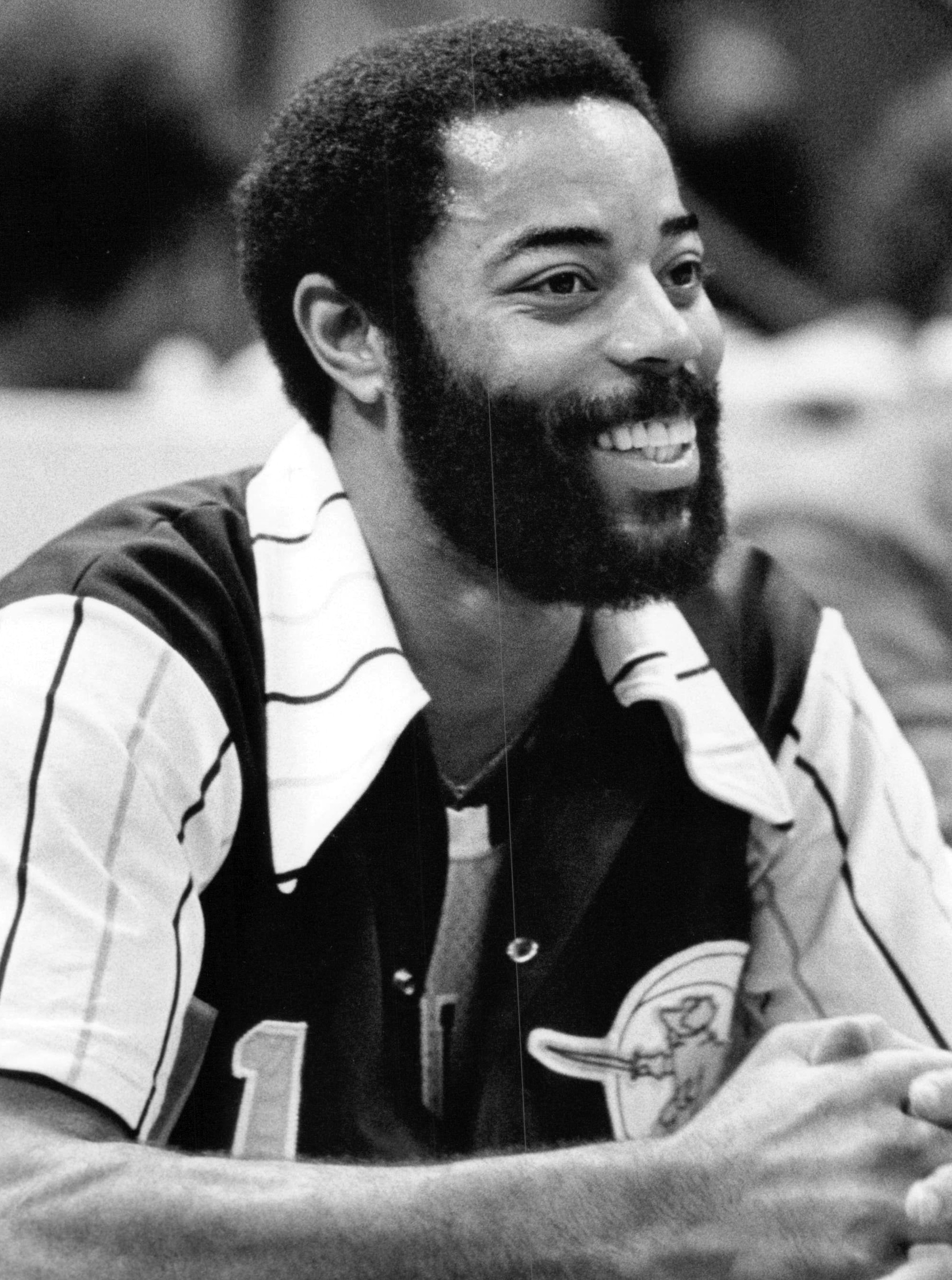
Walt "Clyde" Frazier was the Knicks' first round pick in 1967, a member of the 1970 and 1973 championship squads, and is currently a broadcaster for the team

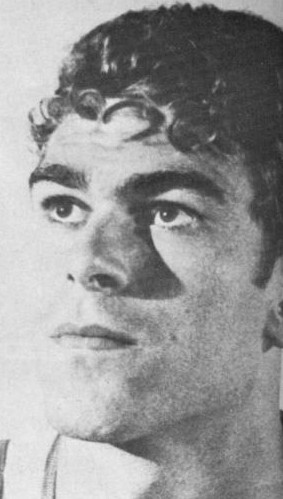
Phil Jackson was selected in the second round of the 1967 draft and would play on two championship teams with the Knicks. After retiring as a player, he became a coach and won eleven championships: Six with the Bulls and five with the Lakers

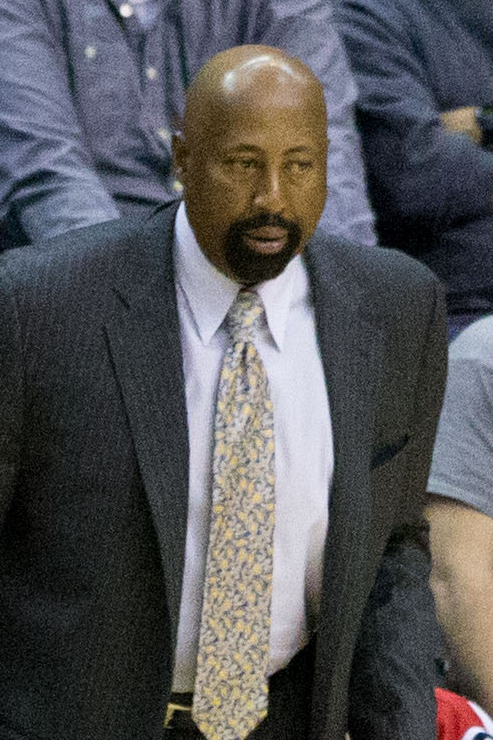
Mike Woodson (pictured in 2013) would later also become the Knicks' head coach.

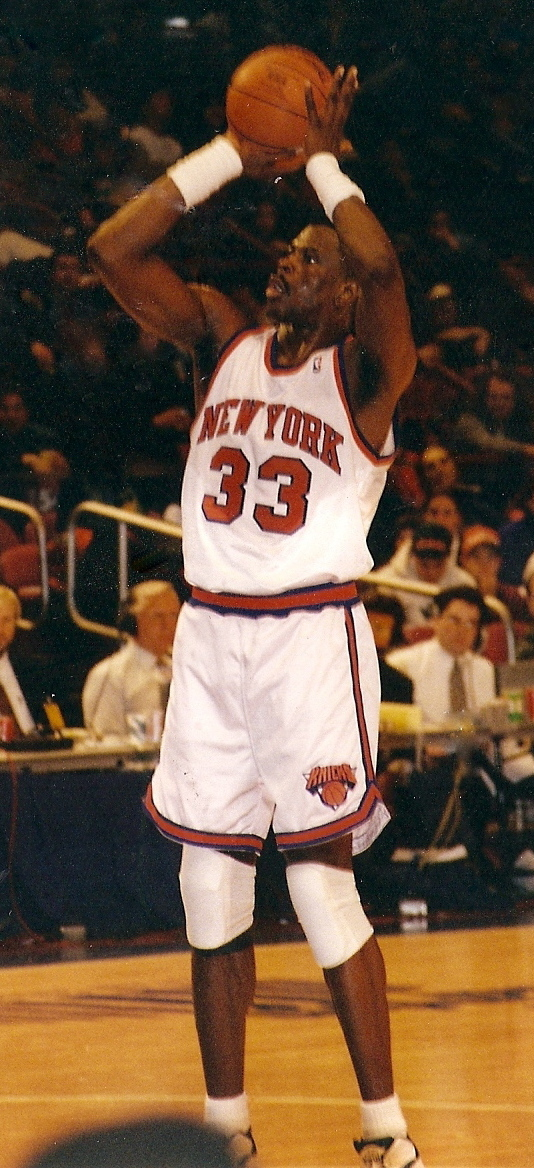
Patrick Ewing was the first overall pick in the 1985 draft

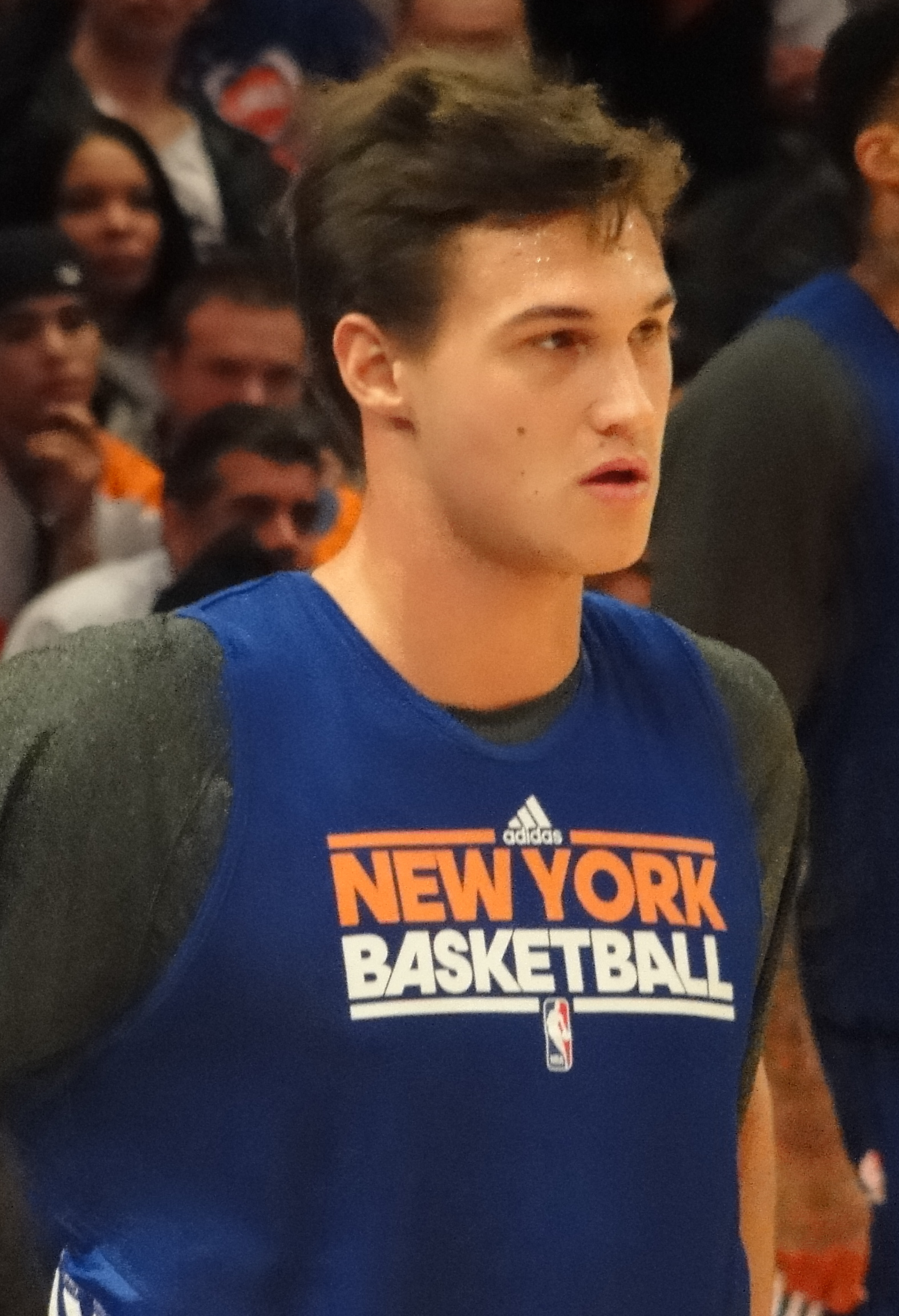
Danilo Gallinari was the sixth overall pick in the 2008 draft. He has since been traded to the Denver Nuggets

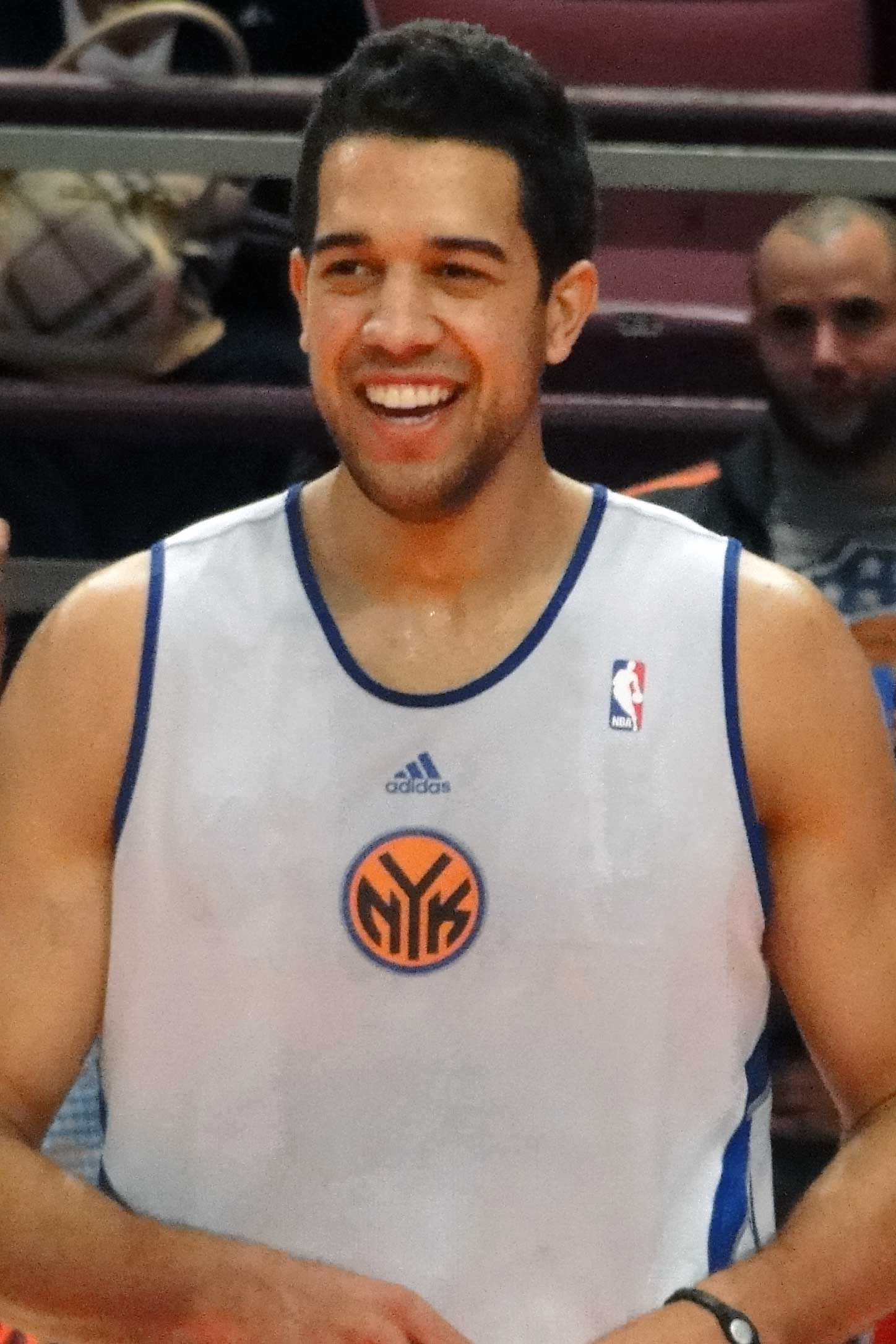
Landry Fields was drafted in the second round in 2010

Year	League	Round	Pick	Nationality	Player	College/High School/Club	Notes	References
1947	1	5	Dick Holub	United States	C	Long Island		
1948	1	4	Dolph Schayes^	United States	C	NYU		
1949	1	7	Dick McGuire^ (15)	United States	G	St. John's		
1950	1	6	Irwin Dambrot^{#}	United States	F	CCNY		
1950	2	17	Herb Scherer	United States	C	Long Island		
1951	1	6	Ed Smith	United States	F	Harvard		
1951	2	15	Roland Minson^{#}	United States	G	Brigham Young		
1952	1	5	Ralph Polson	United States	F/C	Whitworth		
1953	T		Walter Dukes^{+}	United States	C	Seton Hall		
1953	2	9	Don Ackerman	United States	PG	Long Island		
1953	2	15	Nield Gordon^{#}	United States	F	Furman		
1954	1	8	Jack Turner	United States	G/F	Western Kentucky		
1954	2	17	Richie Guerin*	United States	G	Iona		
1955	1	4	Ken Sears^{+}	United States	PF	Santa Clara		
1955	2	11	Jerry Mullen^{#}	United States	F	San Francisco		
1956	1	4	Ronnie Shavlik	United States	F	North Carolina State		
1956	2	11	Gary Bergen	United States	C	Utah		
1957	1	5	Brendan McCann	United States	G	St. Bonaventure		
1957	2	13	Larry Friend	United States	G/F	California		
1958	1	3	Mike Farmer	United States	SF	San Francisco		
1958	1	4	Pete Brennan	United States	SF	North Carolina		
1958	2	11	Joe Quigg^{#}	United States	F/C	North Carolina		
1959	1	5	Johnny Green	United States	SF	Michigan State		
1960	1	3	Darrall Imhoff^{+}	United States	C	California		
1960	2	10	Dave Budd	United States	PF	Wake Forest		
1960	2	11	Kelly Coleman^{#}	United States	G	Kentucky Wesleyan		
1961	1	2	Tom Stith	United States	SF	St. Bonaventure		
1961	2	10	Whitey Martin	United States	G	St. Bonaventure		
1962	1	2	Paul Hogue	United States	C	Cincinnati		
1962	2	9	John Rudometkin	United States	SF	USC		
1963	1	1	Art Heyman	United States	SF/G	Duke		
1963	2	9	Jerry Harkness	United States	PG	Loyola (Chicago)		
1964	1	1	Jim Barnes	United States	C/F	Texas Western		
1964	2	8	Willis Reed^ (19)	United States	C/F	Grambling State		
1964	2	13	Howard Komives	United States	PG	Bowling Green		
1965	T		Bill Bradley^ (24)	United States	SF/SG	Princeton		
1965	1	3	Dave Stallworth	United States	PF/C	Wichita State		
1965	2	10	Dick Van Arsdale^{+}	United States	G/SF	Indiana		
1965	2	14	Hal Blevins	United States	G	Arkansas AM&N		
1966	1	1	Cazzie Russell^{+}	United States	SF/G	Michigan		
1966	2	11	Henry Akin	United States	PF/C	Morehead State		
1967	1	5	Walt Frazier^ (10)	United States	PG	Southern Illinois		
1967	2	17	Phil Jackson	United States	F/C	North Dakota		
1968	1	10	Bill Hosket, Jr.	United States	PF/C	Ohio State		
1969	1	11	John Warren	United States	G/SF	St. John's		
1969	2	26	Bill Bunting^{#}	United States	F/C	North Carolina		
1970	1	17	Mike Price	United States	G	Illinois		
1970	2	34	Howie Wright^{#}	United States	G	Austin Peay		
1971	1	16	Dean Meminger	United States	PG	Marquette		
1971	2	34	Gregg Northington^{#}	United States	C	Alabama State		
1972	1	8	Tom Riker	United States	C/F	South Carolina		
1973	1	14	Mel Davis	United States	SF	St. John's		
1973	2	28	Patrick McFarland^{#}	United States	F/G	Saint Joseph's		
1974	2	32	Jesse Dark	United States	G	Virginia Commonwealth		
1975	1	9	Gene Short	United States	SF	Jackson State		
1975	2	26	Luther Burden	United States	SG	Utah		
1975	2	34	Larry Fogle	United States	G	Canisius		
1976	2	25	Lonnie Shelton^{+}	United States	PF/C	Oregon State		
1977	1	10	Ray Williams	United States	PG	Minnesota		
1977	2	26	Glen Gondrezick	United States	SF/SG	UNLV		
1977	2	32	Toby Knight	United States	PF	Notre Dame		
1978	1	4	Micheal Ray Richardson^{+}	United States	PG/SG	Montana		
1978	2	32	John Rudd	United States	F	McNeese State		
1978	2	34	Greg Bunch	United States	SF	Cal State Fullerton		
1979	1	3	Bill Cartwright^{+}	United States	C	San Francisco		
1979	1	9	Larry Demic	United States	F/C	Arizona		
1979	1	21	Sly Williams	United States	SF/SG	Rhode Island		
1979	2	27	Reggie Carter	United States	SG	St. John's		
1979	2	34	Kim Goetz^{#}	United States	F	San Diego State		
1980	1	12	Mike Woodson	United States	SG/SF	Indiana		
1980	2	36	DeWayne Scales	United States	PF	LSU		
1981	2	40	Greg Cook^{#}	United States	F	LSU		
1982	1	6	Trent Tucker	United States	SG	Minnesota		
1982	2	29	Scott Hastings	United States	PF/C	Arkansas		
1982	2	34	Vince Taylor	United States	SF	Duke		
1983	1	12	Darrell Walker	United States	G	Arkansas		
1985	1	1	Patrick Ewing^ (33)	United States	C	Georgetown		
1985	2	47	Gerald Wilkins	United States	SG	UT–Chattanooga		
1986	1	5	Kenny Walker	United States	SF	Kentucky		
1986	2	47	Michael Jackson	United States	PG	Georgetown		
1987	1	18	Mark Jackson^{+}	United States	PG	St. John's		
1987	2	25	Ron Moore	United States	C	West Virginia State		
1988	1	19	Rod Strickland^{x}	United States	PG	DePaul		
1988	2	37	Greg Butler	United States	C	Stanford		
1989	2	50	Brian Quinnett	United States	PF	Washington State		
1990	1	17	Jerrod Mustaf	United States	PF/C	Maryland		
1991	1	12	Greg Anthony	United States	PG	UNLV		
1992	1	20	Hubert Davis	United States	SG	North Carolina		
1994	1	24	Monty Williams	United States	SF	Notre Dame		
1994	1	26	Charlie Ward	United States	PG	Florida State		
1996	1	18	John Wallace	United States	SF	Syracuse		
1996	1	19	Walter McCarty	United States	PF	Kentucky		
1996	1	21	Dontae' Jones	United States	PF	Mississippi State		
1997	1	25	John Thomas	United States	C	Minnesota		
1998	2	38	DeMarco Johnson	United States	PF	UNC Charlotte		
1998	2	44	Sean Marks	New Zealand	F/C	California		
1999	1	15	Frédéric Weis^{#}	France	C	CSP Limoges (France)		
1999	2	46	J. R. Koch	United States	F	Iowa		
2000	1	22	Donnell Harvey	United States	SF	Florida		
2000	2	39	Lavor Postell	United States	SG	St. John's		
2001	2	38	Michael Wright	United States	PF	Arizona		
2001	2	42	Eric Chenowith	United States	C	Kansas		
2002	1	7	Nenê	Brazil	PF/C	Vasco da Gama (Brazil)		
2002	2	36	Miloš Vujanić	Yugoslavia	PG	KK Partizan (Serbia)		
2003	1	9	Michael Sweetney	United States	PF	Georgetown		
2003	2	30	Maciej Lampe	Poland	F/C	Real Madrid (Spain)		
2003	2	39	Slavko Vraneš	Serbia and Montenegro	C	Budućnost Podgorica (Montenegro)		
2004	2	44	Trevor Ariza	United States	SF	UCLA		
2005	1	8	Channing Frye	United States	PF/C	Arizona		
2005	1	30	David Lee^{+}	United States	PF/C	Florida		
2005	2	54	Dijon Thompson	United States	SG/SF	UCLA		
2006	1	20	Renaldo Balkman	United States	SF/PF	South Carolina		
2006	1	29	Mardy Collins	United States	PG/SG	Temple		
2007	1	23	Wilson Chandler	United States	SF	DePaul		
2008	1	6	Danilo Gallinari	Italy	SF	Olimpia Milano (Italy)		
2009	1	8	Jordan Hill	United States	PF	Arizona		
2010	2	38	Andy Rautins	Canada	SG	Syracuse		
2010	2	39	Landry Fields	United States	SG	Stanford		
2011	1	17	Iman Shumpert	United States	SG/PG	Georgia Tech		
2012	2	48	Kostas Papanikolaou	Greece	PF	Olympiacos (Greece)		
2013	1	24	Tim Hardaway Jr.	United States	G	Michigan		
2014	2	34	Cleanthony Early	United States	SF	Wichita State		
2014	2	51	Thanasis Antetokounmpo	Greece	SF	Delaware 87ers (D-League)		
2015	1	4	Kristaps Porziņģis	Latvia	C	CB Sevilla (Spain)		
2017	1	8	Frank Ntilikina	France	PG	SIG Strasbourg (France)		
2017	2	44	Damyean Dotson	United States	SG	Houston		
2017	2	58	Ognjen Jaramaz	Serbia	PG	Mega Leks (Serbia)		
2018	1	9	Kevin Knox II	United States	SF	Kentucky		
2018	2	36	Mitchell Robinson	United States	C	Chalmette HS (Chalmette, Louisiana)		
2019	1	3	RJ Barrett	Canada	SG	Duke		
2019	2	55	Kyle Guy	United States	SG	Virginia	The Knicks traded Guy to the Sacramento Kings along with cash considerations in exchange for 47th pick Ignas Brazdeikis.	
2020	1	8	Obi Toppin	United States	PF	Dayton		
2020	1	23	Leandro Bolmaro	Argentina	SF	FC Barcelona (Spain)	The Knicks traded Bolmaro to the Minnesota Timberwolves in a three-team trade with the Oklahoma City Thunder in exchange for 25th pick Immanuel Quickley.	
2021	1	19	Kai Jones	Bahamas	C	Texas	The Knicks traded Jones to the Charlotte Hornets in exchange for a future first-round pick. This pick was later traded to the Atlanta Hawks for Cam Reddish.	
2021	1	21	Keon Johnson	United States	SG	Tennessee	The Knicks traded Johnson to the Los Angeles Clippers in exchange for the 25th pick Quentin Grimes.	
2021	2	32	Jeremiah Robinson-Earl	United States	PF/C	Villanova	The Knicks traded Robinson-Earl to the Oklahoma City Thunder in exchange for the 34th (Miles McBride) and 36th picks (Rokas Jokubaitis).	
2021	2	58	Jericho Sims	United States	PF	Texas		
2022	1	11	Ousmane Dieng	France	SF	New Zealand Breakers (Australia)	The Knicks traded Dieng to the Oklahoma City Thunder for three future first-round picks, one of which was traded to the Charlotte Hornets for the 13th overall pick (Jalen Duren), who was subsequently traded to the Detroit Pistons.	
2022	2	42	Trevor Keels	United States	SG	Duke		
2024	1	24	Kyshawn George	Switzerland	SG	Miami	Immediately traded for the 26th and 51st overall picks in the 2024 draft.	
