= 1956–57 New York Knicks season =

Season of National Basketball Association team the New York Knicks

- Head coach: Vince Boryla
- General manager: Ned Irish
- Arena: Madison Square Garden

Results
- Record: 36–36 (.500)
- Place: Division: 4th (Eastern)
- Playoff finish: Did not qualify

Local media
- Television: WPIX
- Radio: WINS

The 1956–57 New York Knicks season was the 11th season for the team in the National Basketball Association (NBA). With a 36–36 record that placed them fourth in the Eastern Division, the Knicks failed to qualify for the NBA playoffs.

== NBA draft ==
Note: This is not an extensive list; it only covers the first and second rounds, and any other players picked by the franchise that played at least one game in the league.

Round	Pick	Player	Position	Nationality	School/Club team
1	4	Ronnie Shavlik	F	United States	NC State
2	11	Gary Bergen	C	United States	Utah
–	–	Pat Dunn	G	United States	Utah State

== Regular season ==
=== Season standings ===
Eastern Division	W	L	PCT	GB	Home	Road	Neutral	Div
x-Boston Celtics	44	28	.611	-	24-4	11-18	9-6	20-16
x-Syracuse Nationals	38	34	.528	6	23-9	9-15	6-10	20-16
x-Philadelphia Warriors	37	35	.514	7	20-5	5–25	12-5	17-19
New York Knicks	36	36	.500	8	18-10	9-19	9-7	15-21

x – clinched playoff spot

=== Game log ===
1956–57 Game log
#	Date	Opponent	Score	High points	Record
1	October 27	Boston	115–112	Ray Felix (22)	0–1
2	November 3	@ Boston	113–107	Ken Sears (23)	1–1
3	November 4	@ Fort Wayne	96–83	Ken Sears (17)	2–1
4	November 7	@ St. Louis	101–107	Ken Sears (22)	2–2
5	November 10	@ Philadelphia	81–83	Ken Sears (17)	2–3
6	November 11	Philadelphia	95–106	Harry Gallatin (32)	3–3
7	November 14	@ Rochester	87–90	Ray Felix (22)	3–4
8	November 18	St. Louis	69–102	Ken Sears (16)	4–4
9	November 21	N Fort Wayne	103–104 (OT)	Carl Braun (19)	4–5
10	November 24	Rochester	96–87	Carl Braun (20)	4–6
11	November 25	@ Rochester	93–95	Ray Felix (26)	4–7
12	November 27	Fort Wayne	98–105	Harry Gallatin (21)	5–7
13	November 30	@ Philadelphia	99–110	Harry Gallatin (19)	5–8
14	December 1	Syracuse	100–117	Ken Sears (25)	6–8
15	December 2	@ Syracuse	100–110	Nathaniel Clifton (24)	6–9
16	December 4	Minneapolis	88–101	Ken Sears (18)	7–9
17	December 6	N Rochester	92–95	Ray Felix (20)	8–9
18	December 7	@ St. Louis	107–101	Ken Sears (23)	9–9
19	December 8	N St. Louis	104–109	Carl Braun (25)	10–9
20	December 9	@ Minneapolis	100–91	Carl Braun (24)	11–9
21	December 11	St. Louis	137–128	Harry Gallatin (32)	11–10
22	December 12	N Minneapolis	103–121	Carl Braun (25)	11–11
23	December 15	@ Rochester	91–76	Ron Sobieszczyk (16)	12–11
24	December 16	@ Fort Wayne	80–84	Harry Gallatin (19)	12–12
25	December 18	Boston	99–110	Ken Sears (21)	13–12
26	December 23	Philadelphia	95–90	Nathaniel Clifton (23)	13–13
27	December 25	St. Louis	107–105 (OT)	Harry Gallatin (25)	13–14
28	December 27	@ Philadelphia	87–112	Harry Gallatin (16)	13–15
29	December 30	Rochester	88–96	Ken Sears (33)	14–15
30	January 1	@ Syracuse	102–106	Harry Gallatin (21)	14–16
31	January 3	Syracuse	111–126	Willie Naulls (21)	15–16
32	January 5	@ Fort Wayne	96–109	Carl Braun (24)	15–17
33	January 6	@ Minneapolis	111–101	Ken Sears (26)	16–17
34	January 8	Boston	102–113	Harry Gallatin (26)	17–17
35	January 10	N St. Louis	84–89 (OT)	Ken Sears (23)	18–17
36	January 12	@ Philadelphia	82–116	Ron Sobieszczyk (16)	18–18
37	January 13	Philadelphia	90–101	Harry Gallatin (22)	19–18
38	January 17	N Minneapolis	94–93	Ken Sears (20)	20–18
39	January 19	Fort Wayne	100–102	Clifton, Naulls (18)	21–18
40	January 20	@ Boston	78–114	Willie Naulls (21)	21–19
41	January 22	Syracuse	88–90	Ken Sears (19)	22–19
42	January 23	N Philadelphia	99–93	Ray Felix (21)	22–20
43	January 24	@ Syracuse	97–115	Harry Gallatin (22)	22–21
44	January 26	Minneapolis	107–122	McGuire, Naulls (20)	23–21
45	January 27	@ Fort Wayne	102–103 (OT)	Ken Sears (23)	23–22
46	January 29	Philadelphia	110–114	Naulls, Sobieszczyk (23)	24–22
47	January 30	N Rochester	80–92	Willie Naulls (20)	25–22
48	January 31	N Philadelphia	106–102	Ron Sobieszczyk (20)	25–23
49	February 2	Boston	114–111	Carl Braun (28)	25–24
50	February 3	@ Boston	98–116	Nathaniel Clifton (30)	25–25
51	February 5	Rochester	91–88	Ken Sears (20)	25–26
52	February 6	N Syracuse	100–119	Braun, Sears (25)	26–26
53	February 8	N Boston	92–90	Carl Braun (27)	27–26
54	February 9	Syracuse	101–89	Harry Gallatin (17)	27–27
55	February 10	@ Syracuse	100–102	Harry Gallatin (27)	27–28
56	February 13	@ Rochester	85–82	Carl Braun (32)	28–28
57	February 14	N Minneapolis	97–99	Richie Guerin (26)	28–29
58	February 16	Minneapolis	112–120	Carl Braun (30)	29–29
59	February 17	@ Philadelphia	115–123	Jim Baechtold (20)	29–30
60	February 19	Boston	112–110	Richie Guerin (35)	29–31
61	February 21	N Fort Wayne	114–120	Harry Gallatin (24)	29–32
62	February 23	Fort Wayne	94–102	Ray Felix (19)	30–32
63	February 24	@ Boston	85–97	Harry Gallatin (24)	30–33
64	February 26	St. Louis	76–107	Ray Felix (17)	31–33
65	February 28	N Boston	122–121 (OT)	Richie Guerin (25)	32–33
66	March 2	@ St. Louis	97–94	Ken Sears (21)	33–33
67	March 3	@ Minneapolis	108–119	Richie Guerin (21)	33–34
68	March 5	Syracuse	99–92	Ken Sears (19)	33–35
69	March 6	@ Syracuse	100–93	Harry Gallatin (29)	34–35
70	March 7	N Syracuse	94–99	Guerin, Sears (17)	35–35
71	March 10	Philadelphia	103–104	Harry Gallatin (22)	36–35
72	March 13	@ Boston	91–122	Ken Sears (16)	36–36
