= Ferdinand Courleux =

American athlete and coach (1881–1960)

Biographical details
- Born: August 16, 1881; Cahokia, Illinois, U.S.
- Died: May 19, 1960 (aged 78); Cape Girardeau, Missouri, U.S.

Playing career

Football
- 1904–1907: Cape Girardeau Normal

Basketball
- 1904–1908: Cape Girardeau Normal

Coaching career (HC unless noted)

Football
- 1915–1929: Cape Girardeau Normal

Basketball
- 1908–1909: Cape Girardeau Normal
- 1915–1928: Cape Girardeau Normal
- 1929–1930: Cape Girardeau Normal

Administrative career (AD unless noted)
- 1915–1932: Cape Girardeau Normal

Ferdinand John Courleux (August 16, 1881 – May 19, 1960) was an American football and basketball player and coach. He was the head football coach and head men's basketball coach at Southeast Missouri State University – then known as Southeast Missouri Normal School. He was also a physical education and the school's first full-time athletic director.
