= Rich Eichhorst =

American basketball player (born 1933)

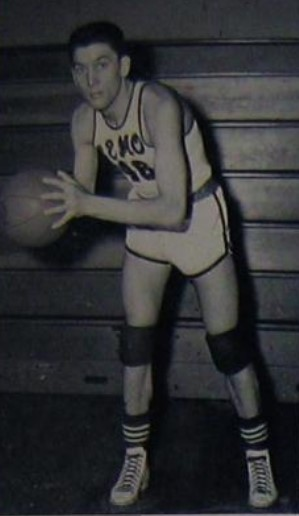
- Eichhorst as a sophomore at SEMO

Personal information
- Born: October 21, 1933 (age 93)
- Listed height: 6 ft 3 in (1.91 m)
- Listed weight: 200 lb (91 kg)

Career information
- High school: Hancock (St. Louis, Missouri)
- College: Southeast Missouri State (1952–1956)
- NBA draft: 1956: undrafted
- Position: Guard

Career history
- 1962: St. Louis Hawks
- Stats at NBA.com
- Stats at Basketball Reference

Richard A. "Ike" Eichhorst (born October 21, 1933) is an American retired professional basketball player from St. Louis, Missouri who played one game with the National Basketball Association (NBA) as a member of the St. Louis Hawks during the 1961–62 season. Eichhorst scored two points, had three assists, and grabbed one rebound in ten minutes of action. Eichhorst played college basketball for Southeast Missouri State University.

== College ==
Eichhorst attended Southeast Missouri State College, now known as Southeast Missouri State University, where he was a four-year letternman. He was a first-feam all-conference selection in the Mid-America Intercollegiate Athletics Association (MIAA) as a junior and senior. During the 1955–56 season, Eichhorst ranked third in the MIAA in scoring, averaging 16.6 points per game. He was voted his team's most valuable player and captain as well as setting a school single-game scoring record of 36 points, single-season scoring record of 333 points, and career points with 868. In 2009, Eichhorst was inducted into the Southeast Missouri Athletics Hall of Fame.

== After college ==
After graduating from Southeast Missouri State with a degree in education, Eichhorst joined the United States Army, where he toured in Amateur Athletic Union tournaments with an army basketball team from Fort Knox, Kentucky. Upon being released from the Army in 1958, he returned to his high school, Hancock High School in St Louis, Missouri, becoming their athletic director, basketball and track coach. In 1959, he averaged 24.3 points per game for Cocos to lead the Independent Basketball Association in scoring.

== NBA career ==
While at Hancock in 1962, he played in the NBA for the St. Louis Hawks in the final game of their 1961–62 season. The team was short on players. He recorded a field goal, three assists and one rebound in 10 minutes of play in a 125–115 loss to the Los Angeles Lakers.

== After basketball ==
He was appointed the principal of Hancock in 1968.

Eichhorst was also an official in the American Football League (AFL), moving to the National Football League (NFL) in 1970, the first season following the NFL-AFL merger. He resigned from the NFL at the conclusion of the 1970 campaign to concentrate on his career as a college basketball official, where he would carve out a lengthy and distinguished tenure officiating in the Big Eight and Missouri Valley conferences.

== Career statistics ==
Legend
GP	Games played	GS	Games started	MPG	Minutes per game
FG%	Field goal percentage	3P%	3-point field goal percentage	FT%	Free throw percentage
RPG	Rebounds per game	APG	Assists per game	SPG	Steals per game
BPG	Blocks per game	PPG	Points per game	**Bold**	Career high

=== NBA ===
==== Regular season ====
Year	Team	GP	MPG	FG%	FT%	RPG	APG	PPG
1961–62	St. Louis	1	10.0	.500	–	1.0	3.0	2.0
