= Ognjen Jaramaz =

Serbian basketball player (born 1995)

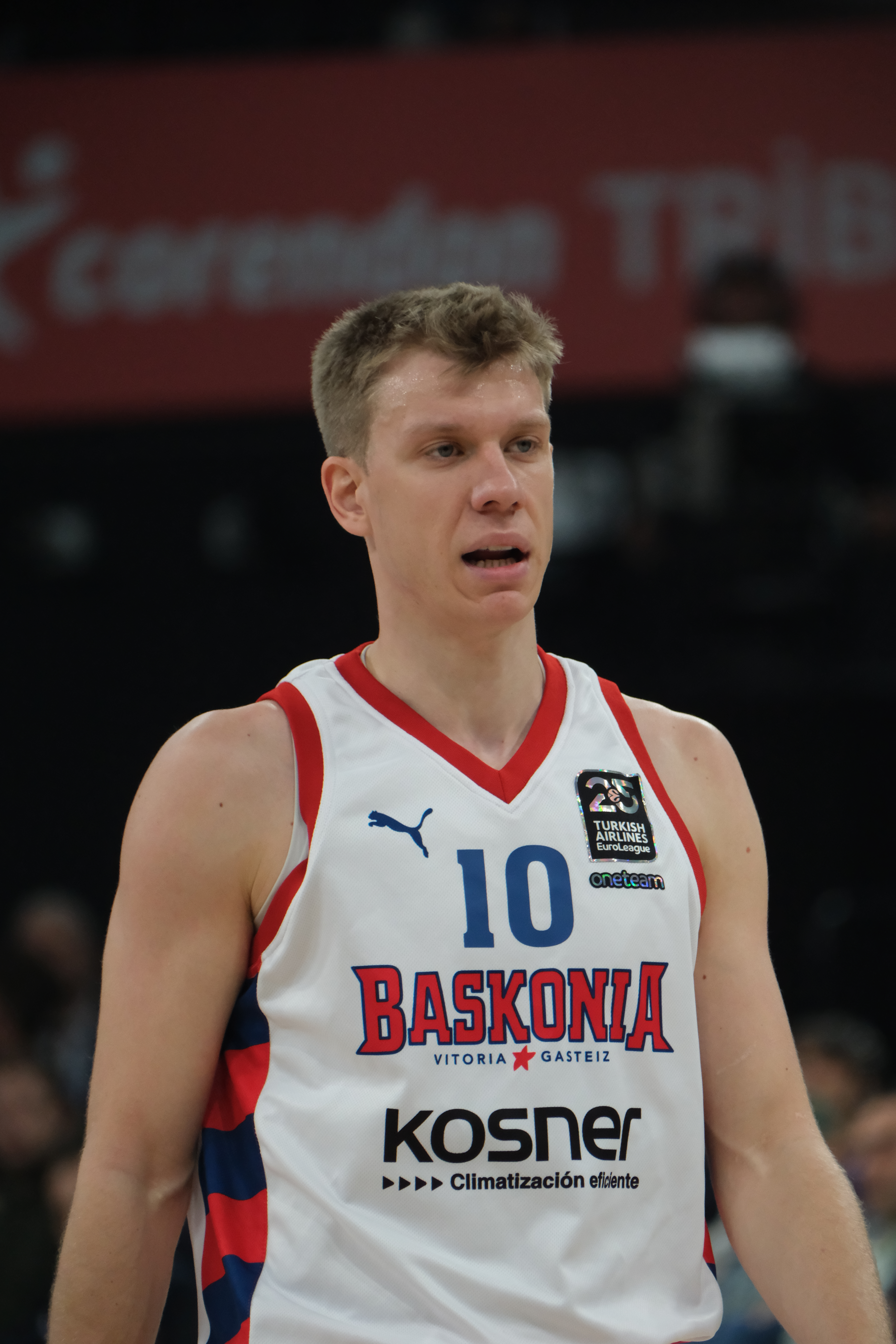
- Jaramaz with Baskonia in 2025

No. 10 – Lietkabelis Panevėžys
- Position: Shooting guard / point guard
- League: LKL; EuroCup

Personal information
- Born: September 1, 1995 (age 31) Kruševac, Serbia, FR Yugoslavia
- Listed height: 1.93 m (6 ft 4 in)
- Listed weight: 88 kg (194 lb)

Career information
- NBA draft: 2017: 2nd round, 58th overall pick
- Drafted by: New York Knicks
- Playing career: 2013–present

Career history
- 2013–2017: Mega Vizura
- 2013–2014: →Smederevo 1953
- 2018: Mega Vizura
- 2018–2019: San Pablo Burgos
- 2019: →Partizan
- 2019–2021: Partizan
- 2021–2023: Bayern Munich
- 2023–2024: Partizan
- 2024–2025: Baskonia
- 2025: Ilirija
- 2025–2026: Cedevita Olimpija
- 2026–present: Lietkabelis Panevėžys

Career highlights
- ABA League Supercup winner (2019); 3× Serbian Cup winner (2016, 2019, 2020); Serbian Cup MVP (2020); German Cup winner (2023)
- Stats at Basketball Reference
Medals
Men's basketball
Representing Serbia
U20 European Championship
Bronze medal – third place	2014 Greece	Team
Gold medal – first place	2015 Italy

Ognjen Jaramaz (Serbian: Огњен Јарамаз; born 1 September 1995) is a Serbian professional basketball player for Lietkabelis Panevėžys of the Lithuanian Basketball League (LKL) and the EuroCup. Standing at 1.93 m (6 ft 4 in), he plays at the shooting guard and point guard positions.

== Professional career ==
He began playing basketball in his elementary school basketball club OKK Junior where he stayed until 2006. He then moved to Partizan, playing for the youth categories until 2012, when he moved to the Mega Vizura junior team.

In the summer of 2013, Jaramaz signed a contract with Mega Vizura. He was loaned to Smederevo 1953 for the 2013–14 season, where he made his professional debut. He returned to Mega Vizura in the summer of 2014. He left the club after the end of the 2016–17 season. However, on January 3, 2018, Jaramaz returned to Mega.

In June 2018, Jaramaz signed a two-year contract with Spanish club San Pablo Burgos. Jaramaz was loaned to Partizan for the second half of the 2018–19 campaign and then spent the subsequent two seasons with the Serbian powerhouse on a regular transfer.

=== Bayern Munich (2021–2023) ===
On July 2, 2021, Jaramaz signed with Bayern Munich of the German Basketball Bundesliga (BBL) and the EuroLeague. In his debut season with the club, Jaramaz averaged 6.8 points and 3.4 rebounds over 36 EuroLeague games. Bayern finished the season as runners-up in the Basketball Bundesliga. In 2022–23 season, he averaged 6.4 points on 39.2% shooting from the field.

=== Return to Partizan (2023–2024) ===
On 13 July 2023, Jaramaz returned to Partizan. Over 22 EuroLeague games, Jaramaz averaged 3.2 points, 1.5 assists and 1.3 rebounds on 37.3% shooting from the field. The season was deemed to be unsuccessful for Partizan as they finished the season without lifting any trophy.

=== Baskonia (2024–2025) ===
On 27 August 2024, Jaramaz signed with Baskonia of the Spanish Liga ACB and the EuroLeague.

=== Lietkabelis Panevėžys (2026–present) ===
On July 29, 2026, Jaramaz signed a one-year deal with Lietkabelis Panevėžys of the Lithuanian Basketball League (LKL) and the EuroCup.

=== NBA draft rights ===
On June 22, 2017, Jaramaz was selected with the 58th overall pick in the 2017 NBA draft by the New York Knicks. He played for the Knicks during the 2017 NBA Summer League.

== Career statistics ==
Legend
GP	Games played	GS	Games started	MPG	Minutes per game
FG%	Field-goal percentage	3P%	3-point field-goal percentage	FT%	Free-throw percentage
RPG	Rebounds per game	APG	Assists per game	SPG	Steals per game
BPG	Blocks per game	PPG	Points per game	PIR	Performance index rating
**Bold**	Career high

=== EuroLeague ===
Year	Team	GP	GS	MPG	FG%	3P%	FT%	RPG	APG	SPG	BPG	PPG	PIR
2021–22	Bayern Munich	**36**	**11**	**16.4**	**.420**	**.353**	.755	**3.4**	**1.6**	**.4**	**.2**	**6.8**	**5.1**
2022–23	Bayern Munich	25	5	15.6	.392	.328	**.885**	1.2	1.5	.3	.0	6.4	5.0
2023–24	Partizan	22	6	12.8	.373	.211	.467	1.3	1.5	.5	.0	3.2	2.6
Career		83	22	17.3	.402	.318	.775	1.4	1.3	.5	.1	5.7	4.4

=== EuroCup ===
Year	Team	GP	GS	MPG	FG%	3P%	FT%	RPG	APG	SPG	BPG	PPG	PIR
2019–20	Partizan	**15**	**15**	22.0	**.362**	**.311**	.667	**2.3**	**2.8**	.6	**.1**	9.0	**9.0**
2020–21	Partizan	11	7	**22.7**	.356	.277	**.844**	1.8	2.6	**1.1**	—	**9.5**	8.1
Career		26	22	22.3	.359	.296	.738	2.1	2.7	.8	.1	9.2	8.6

=== Basketball Champions League ===
Year	Team	GP	GS	MPG	FG%	3P%	FT%	RPG	APG	SPG	BPG	PPG
2016–17	Mega	12	9	29.9	.385	.236	.714	3.2	3.1	1.5	.1	11.9
Career		12	9	29.9	.385	.236	.714	3.2	3.1	1.5	.1	11.9

=== Domestic leagues ===
Year	Team	League	GP	MPG	FG%	3P%	FT%	RPG	APG	SPG	BPG	PPG
2012–13	(Serbia) Mega	KLS	4	14.8	.304	.455	.750	1.0	1.2	.5	—	5.5
2013–14	(Serbia) Smederevo	KLS	26	34.4	.439	.339	.797	3.8	2.6	1.3	.1	18.5
2013–14	(Serbia) Mega	KLS	14	16.3	.397	.382	.867	2.2	.8	.7	.1	5.4
2014–15	(Serbia) Mega	KLS	13	12.0	.333	.176	.667	1.7	2.1	.7	—	3.6
2014–15	(Serbia) Mega	ABA	25	21.6	.293	.195	.633	2.5	2.6	1.0	.1	5.5
2015–16	(Serbia) Mega	ABA	24	27.3	.385	.294	.653	3.1	2.7	2.2	.0	11.5
2016–17	(Serbia) Mega	KLS	16	30.1	.415	.359	.759	3.1	3.7	.9	.1	14.5
2016–17	(Serbia) Mega	ABA	25	27.0	.354	.246	.731	2.7	3.6	1.0	.1	10.8
2017–18	(Serbia) Mega	KLS	5	24.0	.614	.333	.500	2.6	4.2	.6	—	13.0
2017–18	(Serbia) Mega	ABA	5	24.4	.442	.278	.688	3.4	3.8	1.2	.2	10.8
2018–19	(Spain) Miraflores	ACB	18	13.5	.409	.222	.838	.8	.8	.8	—	6.4
2018–19	(Serbia) Partizan	KLS	17	19.8	.464	.339	.841	2.2	2.9	1.1	.1	10.2
2018–19	(Serbia) Partizan	ABA	5	13.3	.348	.300	.667	1.2	1.2	.6	.2	6.6
2019–20	(Serbia) Partizan	ABA	20	21.2	.435	.333	.789	2.0	2.3	.9	.0	10.4
2020–21	(Serbia) Partizan	KLS	5	25.4	.420	.400	.692	2.4	6.0	.8	—	12.2
2020–21	(Serbia) Partizan	ABA	18	26.3	.467	.388	.754	1.7	3.8	1.1	.1	12.7
2021–22	(Germany) Bayern Munich	BBL	35	21.2	.405	.315	.788	1.9	2.2	.8	.1	8.3
2022–23	(Germany) Bayern Munich	BBL	35	16.4	.380	.255	.753	1.5	1.4	.7	—	6.8
2023–24	(Serbia) Partizan	KLS	1	4.5	—	—	—	—	—	—	—	0.0
2023–24	(Serbia) Partizan	ABA	22	16.7	.407	.200	.600	1.5	3.0	.7	.1	4.0

== Personal life ==
His older brother Nemanja is also a professional basketball player.

In July 2024, Ognjen married Lara Stefanović.

== See also ==
- List of NBA drafted players from Serbia
- New York Knicks draft history
