= Jackie Moore (basketball) =

American basketball player (1932–2026)

Personal information
- Born: September 24, 1932 Philadelphia, Pennsylvania, U.S.
- Died: April 9, 2026 (aged 93)
- Listed height: 6 ft 5 in (1.96 m)
- Listed weight: 180 lb (82 kg)

Career information
- High school: Overbrook (Philadelphia, Pennsylvania)
- College: La Salle (1951–1953)
- NBA draft: 1954: undrafted
- Playing career: 1954–1960
- Position: Small forward
- Number: 14, 4

Career history
- 1954: Syracuse Nationals
- 1954: Milwaukee Hawks
- 1954–1955: Sunbury Mercuries
- 1955–1957: Philadelphia Warriors
- 1957–1960: Sunbury Mercuries

Career highlights
- NBA champion (1956)
- Stats at NBA.com
- Stats at Basketball Reference

John T. Moore (September 24, 1932 – April 9, 2026) was an American professional basketball player.

Moore played college basketball for the La Salle Explorers until he was suspended for the 1953–54 season because of academic reasons.

A 6-foot-5-inch (1.96 m) small forward, Moore played three seasons (1954–1957) in the National Basketball Association as a member of the Syracuse Nationals, Milwaukee Hawks, and Philadelphia Warriors. He averaged 2.7 points per game in his NBA career and won a league championship in 1956.

Moore played for the Sunbury Mercuries of the Eastern Professional Basketball League (EPBL) during the 1954–55 season. He returned to the team in 1957 and played three more seasons.

Moore died on April 9, 2026, at the age of 93.

== Career statistics ==
Legend
GP	Games played	GS	Games started	MPG	Minutes per game
FG%	Field goal percentage	3P%	3-point field goal percentage	FT%	Free throw percentage
RPG	Rebounds per game	APG	Assists per game	SPG	Steals per game
BPG	Blocks per game	PPG	Points per game	**Bold**	Career high
†	Won an NBA championship

=== NBA ===
==== Regular season ====
Year	Team	GP	MPG	FG%	FT%	RPG	APG	PPG
1954–55	Syracuse	1	5.0	**.500**	.000	1.0	.0	2.0
1954–55	Milwaukee	1	13.0	.143	–	4.0	**2.0**	2.0
1954–55	Philadelphia	20	**17.7**	.394	.512	**5.0**	.9	**5.2**
1955–56†	Philadelphia	54	7.4	.388	.604	2.2	.5	2.4
1956–57	Philadelphia	**57**	7.0	.406	**.804**	2.0	.4	2.2
Career		134	8.8	.391	.623	2.5	.5	2.7

==== Playoffs ====
Year	Team	GP	MPG	FG%	FT%	RPG	APG	PPG
1956†	Philadelphia	**8**	**6.5**	**.400**	**.333**	**2.1**	**.3**	**2.3**
1957	Philadelphia	1	1.0	–	–	.0	.0	.0
Career		9	5.9	.400	.333	1.9	.2	2.0
