= Ron Sobieszczyk =

American basketball player

Personal information
- Born: September 21, 1934 Chicago, Illinois, U.S.
- Died: October 23, 2009 (aged 75) Chicago, Illinois, U.S.
- Listed height: 6 ft 3 in (1.91 m)
- Listed weight: 185 lb (84 kg)

Career information
- High school: St. Bonaventure (Sturtevant, Wisconsin)
- College: DePaul (1953–1956)
- NBA draft: 1956: 1st round, 6th overall pick
- Drafted by: Fort Wayne Pistons
- Playing career: 1956–1963
- Position: Point guard / shooting guard
- Number: 17

Career history
- 1956–1959: New York Knicks
- 1959–1960: Minneapolis Lakers
- 1961–1963: Chicago Majors

Career NBA statistics
- Points: 1,619 (8.4 ppg)
- Rebounds: 791 (4.1 rpg)
- Assists: 553 (1.8 apg)
- Stats at NBA.com
- Stats at Basketball Reference

Ronald Charles Sobieszczyk (September 21, 1934 – October 23, 2009), known as Ron Sobie, was an American professional basketball player.

Sobieszczyk played for coach Ray Meyer at DePaul University from 1953 to 1956. He scored 1,222 points in his college career and participated with the College All-Stars team that toured with the Harlem Globetrotters. After college, he played four seasons in the NBA with the New York Knicks and Minneapolis Lakers, scoring 1,691 points before suffering a knee injury. He then served brief stints with the Washington Generals exhibition team and the Chicago Majors of the ABL.

Sobieszczyk later owned Sobie's Bar and Grill in Cicero, Illinois.

Sobieszczyk died on October 23, 2009, of a degenerative brain disease.

== Career statistics ==
Legend
| GP | Games played | GS | Games started | MPG | Minutes per game |
| FG% | Field goal percentage | 3P% | 3-point field goal percentage | FT% | Free throw percentage |
| RPG | Rebounds per game | APG | Assists per game | SPG | Steals per game |
| BPG | Blocks per game | PPG | Points per game | **Bold** | Career high |

=== NBA ===
==== Regular season ====
| Year | Team | GP | MPG | FG% | FT% | RPG | APG | PPG |
|---|---|---|---|---|---|---|---|---|
| 1956–57 | New York | **71** | 19.4 | .376 | .764 | 4.6 | 1.8 | 6.8 |
| 1957–58 | New York | 55 | **25.4** | **.403** | .820 | **4.8** | **2.3** | **11.5** |
| 1958–59 | New York | 50 | 17.1 | .360 | .842 | 3.1 | 1.6 | 8.0 |
| 1959–60 | New York | 15 | 14.7 | .346 | **.861** | 3.1 | 1.3 | 6.9 |
| 1959–60 | Minneapolis | 1 | 13.0 | .250 | .000 | 2.0 | 2.0 | 2.0 |
| Career | | 192 | 20.1 | .379 | .808 | 4.1 | 1.8 | 8.4 |
