= 1956 NBA draft =

Basketball player selection

General information
- Sport: Basketball
- Date: April 30, 1956
- Location: New York City, New York

Overview
- 92 total selections in 14 rounds
- League: NBA
- Territorial picks: Tom Heinsohn, Boston Celtics
- First selection: Si Green, Rochester Royals
- Hall of Famers: 4: F Tom Heinsohn; C Bill Russell; G K. C. Jones; F Elgin Baylor

The 1956 NBA draft was the tenth annual draft of the National Basketball Association (NBA). The draft was held on April 30, 1956, before the 1956–57 season. In this draft, eight NBA teams took turns selecting amateur U.S. college basketball players. In each round, the teams select in reverse order of their win–loss record in the previous season, except for the defending champion and runner-up, who were assigned the last two picks in each round. The draft consisted of 10 rounds comprising 92 players selected.

== Draft selections and draftee career notes ==
Si Green from Duquesne University was selected first overall by the Rochester Royals. Tom Heinsohn from the College of the Holy Cross was selected before the draft as Boston Celtics' territorial pick. Heinsohn went on to win the Rookie of the Year Award in his first season. Bill Russell from the University of San Francisco was selected second overall by the St. Louis Hawks and immediately traded to the Boston Celtics for Ed Macauley and Cliff Hagan. Three players from this draft, Tom Heinsohn, Bill Russell, and K. C. Jones, have been inducted to the Basketball Hall of Fame after championship careers with the Boston Celtics. Elgin Baylor and Sam Jones, who were selected by the Minneapolis Lakers in the later rounds, have also been inducted to the Basketball Hall of Fame, although they did not enter the league immediately after the draft. In the 1957 draft, Sam Jones was selected in the first round by the Boston Celtics, with whom he played for in his whole career. In the 1958 draft, Elgin Baylor was selected first overall by the Lakers, with whom he played for in his whole career. During this draft, the St. Louis Hawks became the second team to select a high school senior for a future draft as a conditional territorial pick under a new rule that was implemented at the time, with this new rule for the selection of a high school senior that was within the team's territorial rights at the time leading to the Hawks selecting small forward Jack Pirrie from Maplewood Richmond Heights High School from that rule. However, unlike the previous player that was selected like that in the previous year's draft, Wilt Chamberlain for the Philadelphia Warriors, Pirrie would eventually go undrafted in 1960 despite the Hawks giving him the initial territorial draft rights for that year's draft due to a decrease in production in college at Vanderbilt University after previously being considered "one of the greatest high school talents" that was ever seen according to Hawks coach Red Holzman.

== Key ==
Pos.	G	F	C
Position	Guard	Forward	Center

^	Denotes player who has been inducted to the Naismith Memorial Basketball Hall of Fame
^{+}	Denotes player who has been selected for at least one All-Star Game
^{#}	Denotes player who has never appeared in an NBA regular-season or playoff game
^{~}	Denotes player who has been selected as Rookie of the Year

== Draft ==
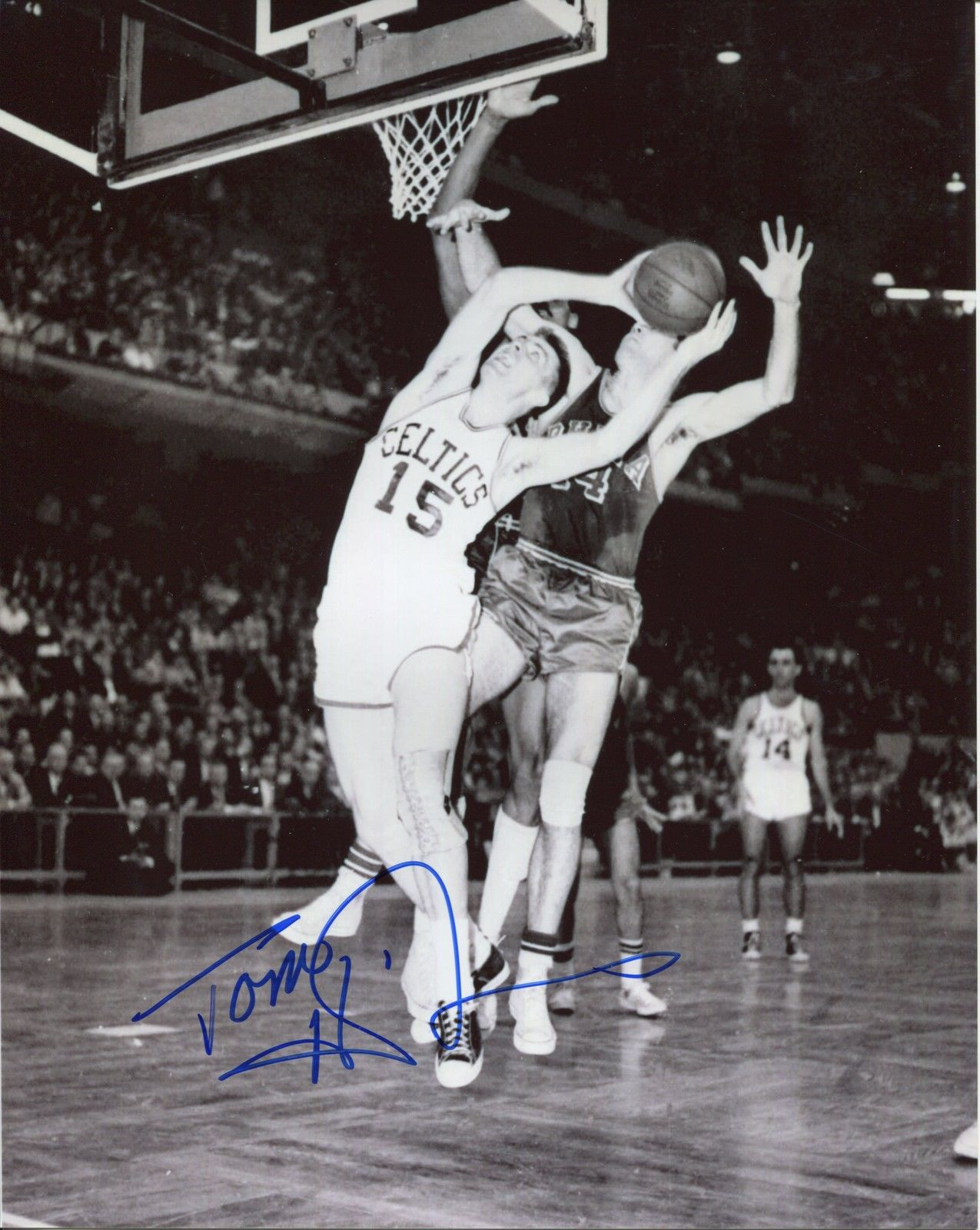
Tom Heinsohn was selected as the Boston Celtics' territorial pick.

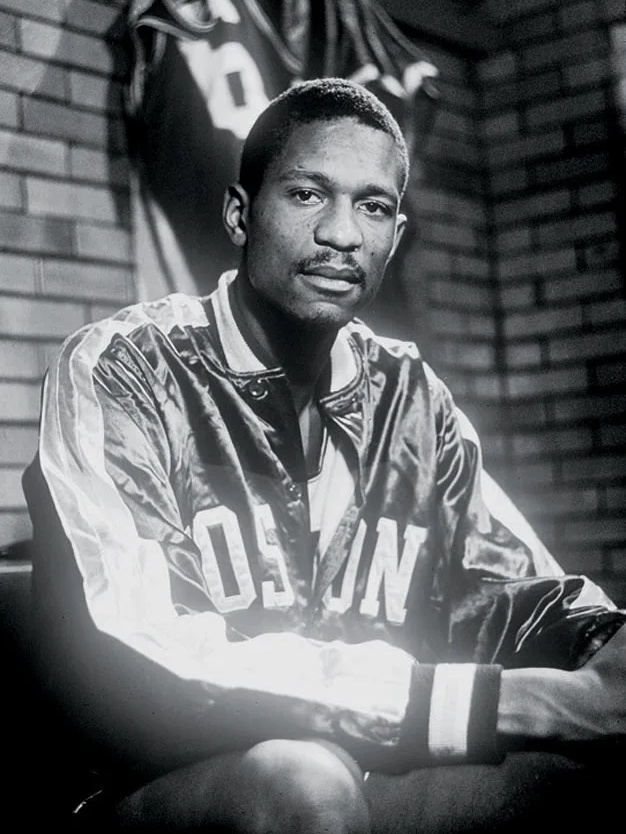
Bill Russell was selected 2nd overall by the St. Louis Hawks and traded to the Boston Celtics.

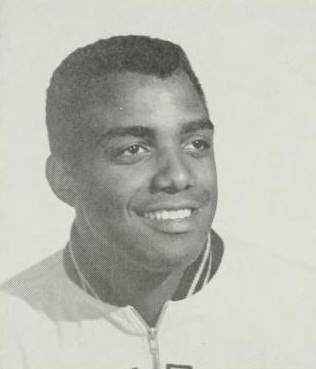
Willie Naulls was selected 9th overall by the St. Louis Hawks.

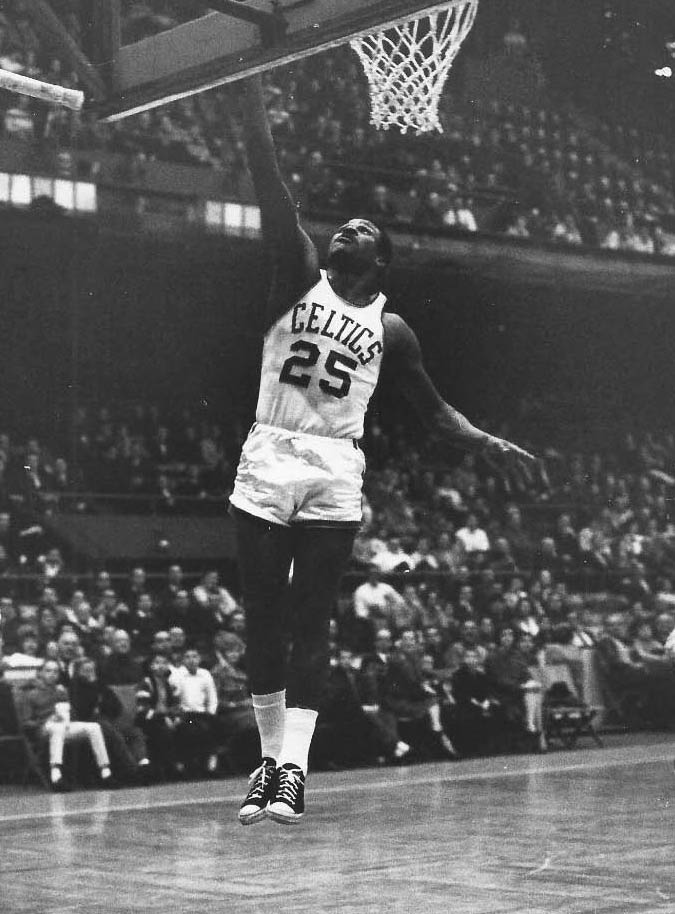
K. C. Jones was selected 13th overall by the Boston Celtics.

Round	Pick	Player	Position	Nationality	Team	College
T	–	Tom Heinsohn^^{~}	F/C	United States	Boston Celtics	Holy Cross
1	1	Si Green	G/F	United States	Rochester Royals	Duquesne
1	2	Bill Russell^	C	United States	St. Louis Hawks (traded to Boston)^{[a]}	San Francisco
1	3	Jim Paxson	G/F	United States	Minneapolis Lakers	Dayton
1	4	Ronnie Shavlik	F	United States	New York Knicks	NC State
1	5	Joe Holup	F	United States	Syracuse Nationals	George Washington
1	6	Ron Sobieszczyk	G	United States	Fort Wayne Pistons (traded to New York)^{[b]}	DePaul
1	7	Hal Lear	G	United States	Philadelphia Warriors	Temple
2	8	Bob Burrow	F/C	United States	Rochester Royals	Kentucky
2	9	Willie Naulls^{+}	F/C	United States	St. Louis Hawks	UCLA
2	10	Terry Rand^{#}	C	United States	Minneapolis Lakers	Marquette
2	11	Gary Bergen	C	United States	New York Knicks	Utah
2	12	Paul Judson^{#}	F	United States	Syracuse Nationals	Illinois
2	13	K. C. Jones^	G	United States	Boston Celtics	San Francisco
2	14	Bob Kessler^{#}	F	United States	Fort Wayne Pistons	Maryland
2	15	Phil Rollins	G	United States	Philadelphia Warriors	Louisville

== Other picks ==
The following list includes other draft picks who have appeared in at least one NBA game.

Round	Pick	Player	Position	Nationality	Team	College
3	16	Dave Piontek	F/C	United States	Rochester Royals	Xavier (OH)
3	18	Jerry Bird	F	United States	Minneapolis Lakers	Kentucky
3	20	Forest Able	G	United States	Syracuse Nationals	Western Kentucky
3	22	Bill Thieben	F/C	United States	Fort Wayne Pistons	Hofstra
4	24	Johnny McCarthy	G	United States	Rochester Royals	Canisius
4	28	Swede Halbrook	C	United States	Syracuse Nationals	Wichita Vickers (NIBL)
4	29	Dan Swartz	F	United States	Boston Celtics	Morehead State
5	33	Norm Stewart	F	United States	St. Louis Hawks	Missouri
5	36	Jim Ray	G	United States	Syracuse Nationals	Toledo
6	42	Phil Jordon	F/C	United States	Minneapolis Lakers	Whitworth
6	43	Pat Dunn	G	United States	New York Knicks	Utah State
7	50	John Barber	F	United States	Minneapolis Lakers	Cal State L.A.
10	74	Bob Hopkins	F/C	United States	Syracuse Nationals	Grambling
14	90	Elgin Baylor^^{~}	F	United States	Minneapolis Lakers^{[c]}	Seattle

== Notable undrafted players ==
These players were not selected in the 1956 draft but played at least one game in the NBA.

Player	Pos.	Nationality	School/club team
Rich Eichhorst	G	United States	Southeast Missouri State

== Trades ==
- ^{a} On draft-day, the Boston Celtics acquired the draft rights to second pick Bill Russell from the St. Louis Hawks in exchange for Ed Macauley and Cliff Hagan.
- ^{b} On draft-day, the New York Knicks acquired the draft rights to sixth pick Ron Sobieszczyk from the Fort Wayne Pistons in exchange for Gene Shue.
- ^{c} Baylor would not play for the Minneapolis Lakers until he was drafted by them again 1st overall in the 1958 NBA draft.

== See also ==
- List of first overall NBA draft picks
