= John Barber (basketball) =

American basketball player

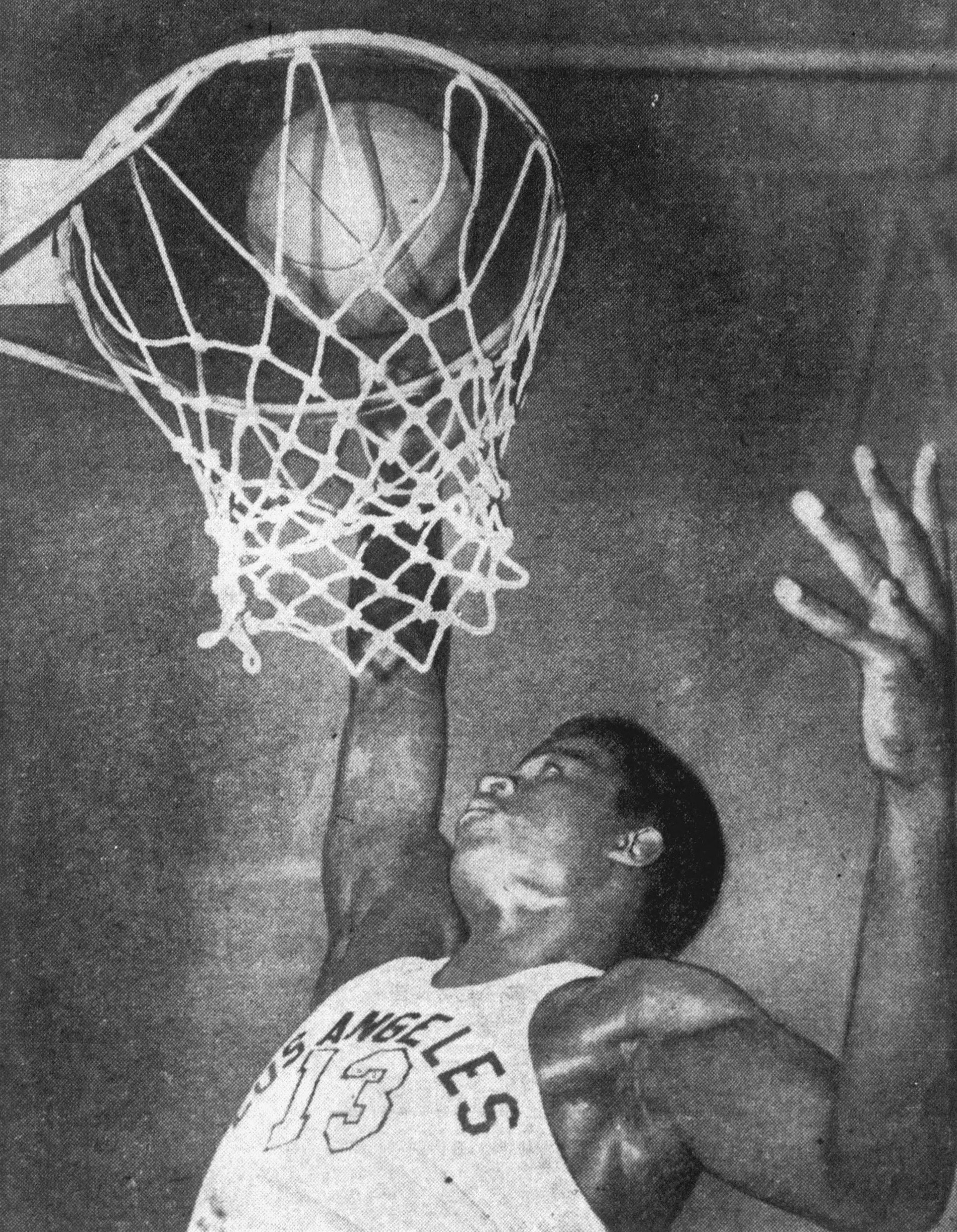
- Barber with Cal State LA, c. 1953

Personal information
- Born: June 27, 1927 (age 99) U.S.
- Listed height: 6 ft 6 in (1.98 m)
- Listed weight: 210 lb (95 kg)

Career information
- High school: Pruitt (Atlanta, Texas)
- College: Cal State LA (1952–1954)
- NBA draft: 1956: 7th round, 50th overall pick
- Drafted by: Minneapolis Lakers
- Position: Forward
- Number: 25

Career history
- 1957: St. Louis Hawks
- Stats at NBA.com
- Stats at Basketball Reference

John Barber (born June 27, 1927) is an American former professional basketball player. He played collegiately for California State University, Los Angeles and was selected by the Minneapolis Lakers in the 1956 NBA draft. Barber played for the St. Louis Hawks in the NBA for five games during the 1956–57 season. He is the grandfather of Jason and Jeryl Sasser and the great-grandfather of Marcus Sasser, all of whom also played in the NBA.

Barber is also one of 36 American basketball players to ever score 100 or more points in a basketball game, and he is the only one to do it three times. Barber scored a career high and NCAA record 188 points vs. Chapman College in 1953. He also scored 150 points in an exhibition game vs LA Scribes magazine team, and 103 vs Los Angeles Community College.

== Career statistics ==
Legend
GP	Games played	GS	Games started	MPG	Minutes per game
FG%	Field goal percentage	3P%	3-point field goal percentage	FT%	Free throw percentage
RPG	Rebounds per game	APG	Assists per game	SPG	Steals per game
BPG	Blocks per game	PPG	Points per game	**Bold**	Career high

=== NBA ===
==== Regular season ====
Year	Team	GP	MPG	FG%	FT%	RPG	APG	PPG
1956–57	St. Louis	5	3.8	.250	.500	1.2	.0	1.4
