= Pat Dunn (basketball) =

American basketball player (1931–1975)

Personal information
- Born: March 17, 1931
- Died: November 11, 1975 (aged 44) Chicago, Illinois
- Listed height: 6 ft 2 in (1.88 m)
- Listed weight: 170 lb (77 kg)

Career information
- High school: St. Patrick (Chicago, Illinois)
- College: Utah State (1952–1956)
- NBA draft: 1956: 6th round, 43rd overall pick
- Drafted by: New York Knicks
- Playing career: 1957–1958
- Position: Shooting guard
- Number: 19

Career history
- 1957–1958: Philadelphia Warriors

Career NBA statistics
- Points: 70 (2.5 ppg)
- Rebounds: 31 (1.1 rpg)
- Assists: 28 (1.0 apg)
- Stats at NBA.com
- Stats at Basketball Reference

Patrick L. Dunn (March 17, 1931 – November 11, 1975) was an American professional basketball player. Dunn was selected in the 1956 NBA draft by the New York Knicks after a collegiate career at Utah State. In one season, which he played for the Philadelphia Warriors, Dunn averaged 2.5 points, 1.1 rebounds and 1.0 assists per game.

Dunn died of leukemia on November 11, 1975. He was inducted into the Illinois Basketball Coaches Hall of Fame in 1976.

== Career statistics ==
Legend
| GP | Games played | GS | Games started | MPG | Minutes per game |
| FG% | Field goal percentage | 3P% | 3-point field goal percentage | FT% | Free throw percentage |
| RPG | Rebounds per game | APG | Assists per game | SPG | Steals per game |
| BPG | Blocks per game | PPG | Points per game | **Bold** | Career high |

=== NBA ===
==== Regular season ====
| Year | Team | GP | MPG | FG% | FT% | RPG | APG | PPG |
|---|---|---|---|---|---|---|---|---|
| 1957–58 | Philadelphia | 28 | 7.4 | .311 | .824 | 1.1 | 1.0 | 2.5 |

==== Playoffs ====
| Year | Team | GP | MPG | FG% | FT% | RPG | APG | PPG |
|---|---|---|---|---|---|---|---|---|
| 1958 | Philadelphia | 3 | 2.7 | .000 | – | .3 | .3 | .0 |
