= Gary Bergen =

American basketball player (1933–2010)

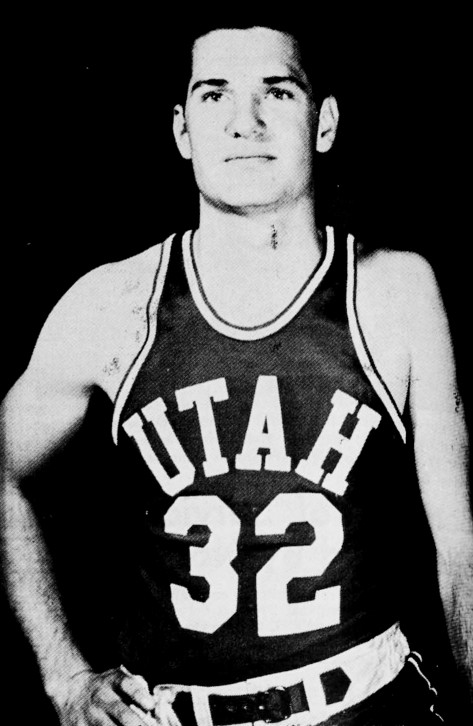

Personal information
- Born: July 16, 1932 Independence, Missouri, U.S.
- Died: July 27, 2010 (aged 78)
- Listed height: 6 ft 8 in (2.03 m)
- Listed weight: 210 lb (95 kg)

Career information
- High school: William Chrisman (Independence, Missouri)
- College: Kansas State (1952–1953); Utah (1954–1956)
- NBA draft: 1956: 2nd round, 11th overall pick
- Drafted by: New York Knicks
- Playing career: 1956–1957
- Position: Center
- Number: 18

Career history
- 1956–1957: New York Knicks
- Stats at NBA.com
- Stats at Basketball Reference

Gary Dean Bergen (July 16, 1933 – July 27, 2010) was an American basketball player. He played collegiately for the University of Utah. Bergen was selected by the New York Knicks in the 1956 NBA draft. He played for the Knicks (1956–57) in the NBA for 6 games. Bergen died on July 27, 2010.

== Career statistics ==
Legend
GP	Games played	GS	Games started	MPG	Minutes per game
FG%	Field goal percentage	3P%	3-point field goal percentage	FT%	Free throw percentage
RPG	Rebounds per game	APG	Assists per game	SPG	Steals per game
BPG	Blocks per game	PPG	Points per game	**Bold**	Career high

=== NBA ===
==== Regular season ====
Year	Team	GP	MPG	FG%	FT%	RPG	APG	PPG
1956–57	New York	6	6.7	.273	1.000	1.3	.2	1.3
