= Southeast Missouri State Redhawks men's basketball =

NCAA Division 1 program

2025–26 Southeast Missouri State Redhawks men's basketball team
- University: Southeast Missouri State University
- Head coach: Brad Korn (6th season)
- Location: Cape Girardeau, Missouri
- Arena: Show Me Center (capacity: 7,373)
- Conference: Ohio Valley
- Nickname: Redhawks
- Colors: Red and black

NCAA Division I tournament runner-up
- 1961*, 1986*, 1989*
Other NCAA Division I tournament results
Final Four	1961*, 1986*, 1989*
Appearances	1961*, 1962*, 1963*, 1964*, 1979*, 1982*, 1983*, 1985*, 1986*, 1987* 1988*, 1989*, 1990*, 2000, 2023

Conference tournament champions
- 2000, 2023

Conference regular-season champions
- 2000, 2025
- * at Division II level

The Southeast Missouri State Redhawks men's basketball team represents Southeast Missouri State University in Cape Girardeau, Missouri, United States. The school's team currently competes in the Ohio Valley Conference. The Redhawks play their home games at the Show Me Center. Prior to January 2005, the team's nickname was the Indians. Prior to joining NCAA Division I in 1991, they participated in the NAIA and NCAA Division II. They were NAIA national champions in 1943. They last appeared in the NCAA tournament in 2023 after clinching an automatic bid to the tournament.

== Postseason results ==
=== NCAA Division I Tournament ===
The Redhawks have appeared in two NCAA Division I Tournaments. Their combined record is 0–2.

Year	Seed	Round	Opponent	Result
2000	#13	First round	#4 LSU	L 61–64
2023	#16	First Four	#16 Texas A&M–Corpus Christi	L 71–75

=== NCAA Division II Tournament ===
The Redhawks have appeared in 13 NCAA Division II Tournaments. Their combined record is 28–14.

Year	Round	Opponent	Result
1961	Regional semifinals Regional Finals; Elite Eight; Final Four; National Championship Game	Colorado College; Southern Illinois; Chicago; South Dakota State; Wittenburg	W 99–68; W 87–84; W 67–41; W 81–69; L 38–42
1962	Regional semifinals Regional Finals; Elite Eight	Abilene Christian; Arkansas State; Nebraska Wesleyan	W 57–55; W 76–64; L 61–71 ^{OT}
1963	Regional semifinals Regional 3rd-place game	Southern Illinois; Arkansas State	L 79–87; L 75–77
1964	Regional semifinals Regional Finals; Regions 3rd-place game	Northern Colorado; Ablilene Christian; State College of Iowa	W 83–79; W 90–87; L 85–93
1979	Regional semifinals Regional 3rd-place game	Nicholls State; Northeast Missouri State	L 74–89; W 86–82
1982	Regional semifinals Regional Finals; Elite Eight	Central Florida; Tennessee–Martin; Florida Southern	W 60–55; W 56–53; L 73–87
1983	Regional semifinals Regional Finals; Elite Eight	Tennessee–Martin; Central Missouri State; Cal State Bakersfield	W 83–71; W 74–69; L 70–75
1985	Regional semifinals Regional Finals; Elite Eight	Alabama A&M; Delta State; Jacksonville State	W 85–74; W 67–59; L 79–80
1986	Regional semifinals Regional Finals; Elite Eight; Final Four; National Championship Game	Abilene Christian; Delta State; Cal State Hayward; Cheyney; Sacred Heart	W 94–72; W 75–74; W 84–69; W 90–81; L 87–93
1987	Regional semifinals Regional Finals	West Texas State; Delta State	W 72–71; L 84–90 ^{OT}
1988	Regional semifinals Regional Finals; Elite Eight	Angelo State; Missouri-Saint Louis; Florida Southern	W 111–75; W 73–69; L 75–78
1989	Regional semifinals Regional Finals; Elite Eight; Final Four; National Championship Game	Angelo State; Central Missouri State; Milwaukee; UC Riverside; North Carolina Central	W 65–60; W 88–73; W 93–84; W 84–83 ^{OT} L 46–73
1990	Regional semifinals Regional Finals; Elite Eight	Southern Indiana; Missouri Western; Kentucky Wesleyan	W 91–73; W 88–73; L 90–91 ^{OT}

=== NAIA Tournament ===
The Redhawks have appeared in one NAIA Tournament. Their record is 5–0 and were national champions in 1943, their only appearance in the tournament.

Year	Round	Opponent	Result
1943	First round Second Round; Quarterfinals; Semifinals; National Championship Game	Dakota Wesleyan; Westminster (MO); Eastern Washington; Murray State; Northwest Missouri State	W 50–30; W 56–33; W 57–51; W 38–36; W 34–32

== Notable players ==
=== NBA ===
Southeast Missouri State has had two former players go on to play in the NBA.

Name	Years in NBA
Antonius Cleveland	2018-20
Rich Eichhorst	1962

=== International leagues ===
- Milos Vranes (born 1995), in the Austrian Basketball Bundesliga
- Tyler Stone (born 1991), in the Israeli Basketball Premier League
