= 1962–63 Ohio Bobcats men's basketball team =

American college basketball season

1962–63 Ohio Bobcats men's basketball
- Conference: Mid-American Conference
- Record: 13–11 (8–4 MAC)
- Head coach: Jim Snyder (14th season)
- Home arena: Grover Center

1962–63 Mid-American Conference men's basketball standings
	Conf.				Overall
Team	W		L	PCT	W		L	PCT
Bowling Green State	9	–	3	.750	19	–	8	.704
Ohio	8	–	4	.667	13	–	11	.542
Toledo	8	–	4	.667	13	–	11	.542
Miami (Ohio)	8	–	4	.667	12	–	12	.500
Western Michigan	7	–	5	.583	12	–	12	.500
Marshall	1	–	11	.083	7	–	16	.304
Kent State	1	–	11	.083	3	–	18	.143
Rankings from AP Poll

The 1962–63 Ohio Bobcats men's basketball team represented Ohio University as a member of the Mid-American Conference in the college basketball season of 1962–63. The team was coached by Jim Snyder and played their home games at Grover Center. The Bobcats finished with a record of 13–11 and finished second in the MAC regular season with a conference record of 8–4.

== Schedule ==
Date time, TV	Rank^{#}	Opponent^{#}	Result	Record	Site (attendance) city, state
Regular Season
12/4/1962*		Louisville	L 54–58	0–1	
12/8/1962*		at St. Bonaventure	L 60–75	0–2	
12/12/1962		at Marshall	W 72–71	2–1 (1–0)	
12/15/1962*		at Iowa	W 62–54	2–2	
12/17/1962*		at Creighton	L 55–57	2–3	
12/20/1962*		at Muskingum	W 72–57	3–3	
12/29/1962*		at No. 1 Cincinnati	L 43–73	3–4	
1/2/1963*		Ohio Wesleyan	W 83–51	4–4	
MAC regular season
1/5/1963		at Bowling Green	W 61–56	5–4 (2–0)	
1/8/1963*		at Morehead State	W 76–67	6–4	
1/12/1963		Toledo	W 48–47	7–4 (3–0)	
1/15/1963		at Miami (OH)	L 47–56	7–5 (3–1)	
1/19/1963		at Western Michigan	L 77–87	7–6 (3–2)	
1/21/1963*		No. 2 Loyola (IL)	L 72–80	7-7	
1/26/1963		Kent State	W 61–49	8-7 (4–2)	
2/2/1963		at Toledo	L 42–55	8–8 (4–3)	
2/6/1963		Miami	W 71–67	9–8 (5–3)	
2/9/1963		Bowling Green	L 62–66	9–9 (5–4)	
2/13/1963		Marshall	W 93–73	10–9 (6–4)	
2/16/1963		Western Michigan	W 90–64	11–9 (7–4)	
2/20/1963*		Morehead State	W 81–54	12–9	
2/23/1963		at Kent State	W 64–62	13–9 (8–4)	
2/27/1963*		at No. 3 Loyola (IL)	L 94–114	13–10	
3/2/1963*		at Louisville	L 49–73	13–11	
*Non-conference game. ^{#}Rankings from AP Poll. (#) Tournament seedings in parentheses. All times are in Eastern Time.

== Statistics ==
=== Team statistics ===
Final 1962–63 statistics

Record	Ohio	OPP
Scoring	1589	1566
Scoring Average	66.21	65.25
Field goals – Att	646–1559	600–1486
Free throws – Att	297–471	366–546
Rebounds	1146	1007
Assists		
Turnovers		
Steals		
Blocked Shots		

=== Player statistics ===
			Minutes		Scoring		Total FGs			Free-Throws			Rebounds						
Player	GP	GS	Tot	Avg	Pts	Avg	FG	FGA	Pct	FT	FTA	Pct	Tot	Avg	A	PF	TO	Stl	Blk
Jerry Jackson	24	-			367	15.3	153	360	0.425	61	95	0.642	123	5.1		54			
Don Hilt	24	-			337	14.0	129	303	0.426	79	131	0.603	197	8.2		66			
Paul Storey	24	-			260	10.8	110	288	0.382	40	53	0.755	156	6.5		37			
Stacy Bunton	24	-			221	9.2	90	185	0.486	41	67	0.612	149	6.2		74			
Mike Haley	23	-			102	4.4	43	108	0.398	16	25	0.640	65	2.8		32			
Charles Gill	22	-			96	4.4	39	99	0.394	18	30	0.600	94	4.3		65			
Lloyd Buck	23	-			67	2.9	26	71	0.366	15	23	0.652	67	2.9		29			
Gary Bolen	23	-			63	2.7	26	56	0.464	11	19	0.579	66	2.9		13			
Dave Roberts	21	-			39	1.9	17	53	0.321	5	11	0.455	35	1.7		21			
Tom Davis	14	-			19	1.4	6	12	0.500	7	10	0.700	11	0.8		6			
Joe Barry	13	-			14	1.1	6	16	0.375	2	4	0.500	8	0.6		11			
Dave Thie	8	-			4	0.5	1	7	0.143	2	3	0.667	6	0.8		1			
Bill Sherman	5	-			0	0.0	0	1	0.000	0	0	0.000	0	0.0		1			
Total	24	-	-	-	1589	66.2	646	1559	0.414	297	471	0.631	1146	47.8		410			
Opponents	24	-	-	-	1566	65.3	600	1486	0.404	366	546	0.670	1007	42.0		415			

Legend
GP	Games played	GS	Games started	Avg	Average per game
FG	Field-goals made	FGA	Field-goal attempts	Off	Offensive rebounds
Def	Defensive rebounds	A	Assists	TO	Turnovers
Blk	Blocks	Stl	Steals	High	Team high
