= 1940–41 Ohio Bobcats men's basketball team =

American college basketball season

1940–41 Ohio Bobcats men's basketball

1941 National Invitation Tournament, Runner-up
- Conference: Independent
- Record: 18–4
- Head coach: Dutch Trautwein (3rd season)
- Home arena: Men's Gymnasium

The 1940–41 Ohio Bobcats men's basketball team represented Ohio University in the college basketball season of 1940–41. The team was coached by Dutch Trautwein and played their home games at the Men's Gymnasium. The team finished the regular season 16–3 and was invited to the 1941 National Invitation Tournament. There they defeated Duquesne and City College of New York before losing to Long Island in the NIT final. Ohio's Frank Baumholtz was the NIT Most valuable player.

== Schedule ==
Date time, TV	Rank^{#}	Opponent^{#}	Result	Record	Site (attendance) city, state
Regular Season
		Youngstown State	W 41–25	1–0	
		Xavier	W 69–57	2–0	
		Akron	W 45–29	3–0	
		Marietta	W 60–34	4–0	
		Ohio Wesleyan	W 63–47	5–0	
		at Cincinnati	W 57–42	6–0	
		Toledo	W 48–45	7–0	
		Washington & Jefferson	W 58–47	8–0	
		at Miami	W 61–20	9–0	
		at Dayton	W 72–47	10–0	
		at Muskingum	W 47–32	11–0	
		at Evansville	L 57–58	11–1	
		at Western Kentucky	L 41–57	11–2	
		Miami	W 54–30	12–2	
		at Dayton	W 62–41	13–2	
		Cincinnati	L 42–51	13–3	
		at Xavier	W 49–41	14–3	
		at Marietta	W 41–34	15–3	
		at Ohio Wesleyan	W 62–52	16–3	
NIT
		vs. Duquesne	W 55–40	17–3	
		vs. CCNY; Semi-Final	W 45–43	18–3	
		vs. Long Island; Final	L 42–56	18–4	
*Non-conference game. ^{#}Rankings from AP Poll. (#) Tournament seedings in parentheses. All times are in Eastern Time.
