= 1966–67 Ohio Bobcats men's basketball team =

American college basketball season

1966–67 Ohio Bobcats men's basketball
- Conference: Mid-American Conference
- Record: 8–15 (4–8 MAC)
- Head coach: Jim Snyder (18th season)
- Home arena: Grover Center

1966–67 Mid-American Conference men's basketball standings
	Conf.				Overall
Team	W		L	PCT	W		L	PCT
Toledo	11	–	1	.917	23	–	2	.920
Marshall	10	–	2	.833	20	–	8	.714
Miami (Ohio)	7	–	5	.583	14	–	10	.583
Bowling Green State	5	–	7	.417	11	–	13	.458
Western Michigan	4	–	8	.333	10	–	14	.417
Ohio	4	–	8	.333	8	–	15	.348
Kent State	1	–	11	.083	5	–	18	.217
Rankings from AP Poll

The 1966–67 Ohio Bobcats men's basketball team represented Ohio University as a member of the Mid-American Conference in the college basketball season of 1966–67. The team was coached by Jim Snyder and played their home games at Grover Center. The Bobcats finished with a record of 8–15 and finished fifth in the MAC regular season with a conference record of 4–8.

== Schedule ==
Date time, TV	Rank^{#}	Opponent^{#}	Result	Record	Site (attendance) city, state
Regular Season
12/1/1966*		Ohio Wesleyan	W 86–55	1–0	
12/3/1966*		at Northwestern	L 67–93	1–1	
12/5/1966*		Purdue	L 71–74	1–2	
12/7/1966*		at Indiana	W 91–90 ^{OT}	2–2	
12/10/1966		at Marshall	L 68–70	2–3 (0–1)	
12/17/1966*		at Minnesota	L 67–71	2–4	
12/19/1967*		at Northern Illinois	W 84–76	3–4	
12/22/1966*		at Michigan	L 80–86	3–5	
1/3/1967*		at MacMurray	W 122–70	4–5	
MAC regular season
1/7/1967		at Western Michigan	L 70–72 ^{OT}	4–6 (0–2)	
1/11/1967		Marshall	W 94–93	5–6 (1–2)	
1/18/1967		at Miami (OH)	L 56–68	5–7 (1–3)	
1/21/1967		Otterbein	L 68–75	5–8	
1/28/1967		at Kent State	W 55–53	6-8 (2–3)	
2/1/1967		Western Michigan	W 69–65	7-8 (2–4)	
2/4/1967		at Bowling Green	L 79–82	7–9 (3–4)	
2/8/1967*		at Virginia Tech	L 47–87	7–10	
2/11/1967		Toledo	L 80–84	7–11 (3–5)	
2/15/1967		Miami (OH)	L 56–80	7–12 (3–6)	
2/18/1967		Kent State	W 76–71	8–12 (4–8)	
2/21/1967*		Loyola (IL)	L 70–73	8–13	
2/25/1967		Bowling Green	L 76–77	8–14 (4–7)	
3/1/1967		at Toledo	L 90–93	8–15 (4–8)	
*Non-conference game. ^{#}Rankings from AP Poll. (#) Tournament seedings in parentheses. All times are in Eastern Time.

== Statistics ==
=== Team statistics ===
Final 1966–67 statistics

Record	Ohio	OPP
Scoring	1722	1752
Scoring Average	74.87	76.17
Field goals – Att	707–1761	658–1492
Free throws – Att	308–516	436–649
Rebounds	1284	1025
Assists		
Turnovers		
Steals		
Blocked Shots		

=== Player statistics ===
			Minutes		Scoring		Total FGs			Free-Throws			Rebounds						
Player	GP	GS	Tot	Avg	Pts	Avg	FG	FGA	Pct	FT	FTA	Pct	Tot	Avg	A	PF	TO	Stl	Blk
Gerald McKee	23	-			406	17.7	174	442	0.394	59	96	0.615	239	10.4		57			
Fred Cluff	23	-			272	11.8	103	254	0.406	64	95	0.674	175	7.6		71			
Mike Hammond	23	-			259	11.3	110	251	0.438	39	56	0.696	72	3.1		77			
John Schroeder	23	-			259	11.3	114	270	0.422	31	92	0.337	306	13.3		80			
Larry Coon		-																	
_ Hamilton		-																	
Marshall Hatcher		-																	
Mark McClintick		-																	
_ Reichenbach		-																	
_ Wood		-																	
Total	23	-	-	-	1722	74.9	707	1761	0.401	308	516	0.597	1284	55.8		494			
Opponents	23	-	-	-	1752	76.2	658	1492	0.441	436	649	0.672	1025	44.6		362			

Legend
GP	Games played	GS	Games started	Avg	Average per game
FG	Field-goals made	FGA	Field-goal attempts	Off	Offensive rebounds
Def	Defensive rebounds	A	Assists	TO	Turnovers
Blk	Blocks	Stl	Steals	High	Team high
