= 1961–62 Ohio Bobcats men's basketball team =

American college basketball season

1961–62 Ohio Bobcats men's basketball
- Conference: Mid-American Conference
- Record: 13–10 (8–4 MAC)
- Head coach: Jim Snyder (13th season)
- Home arena: Grover Center

1961–62 Mid-American Conference men's basketball standings
	Conf.				Overall
Team	W		L	PCT	W		L	PCT
No. 8 Bowling Green State	11	–	1	.917	21	–	4	.840
Ohio	8	–	4	.667	13	–	10	.565
Toledo	7	–	5	.583	14	–	10	.583
Western Michigan	6	–	6	.500	13	–	11	.542
Marshall	6	–	6	.500	10	–	13	.435
Miami (Ohio)	3	–	9	.250	7	–	17	.292
Kent State	1	–	11	.083	2	–	19	.095
Rankings from AP Poll

The 1961–62 Ohio Bobcats men's basketball team represented Ohio University as a member of the Mid-American Conference in the college basketball season of 1961–62. The team was coached by Jim Snyder and played their home games at Grover Center. The Bobcats finished with a record of 13–10 and finished second in the MAC regular season with a conference record of 8–4.

== Schedule ==
Date time, TV	Rank^{#}	Opponent^{#}	Result	Record	Site (attendance) city, state
Regular Season
12/2/1961*		at Canisius	L 59–72	0–1	
12/5/1961		at Marshall	W 68–57	1–1 (1–0)	
12/7/1961*		at Morehead State	W 60–56	2–1	
12/11/1961*		St. Francis (PA)	W 80–79	3–1	
12/14/1961*		at Wichita State	L 55–58	3–2	
12/16/1961*		at Nebraska	L 64–81	3–3	
12/18/1961*		at Loyola (IL)	L 69–77	3–4	
MAC regular season
1/6/1962		No. 10 Bowling Green	L 62–64	3–5 (1–1)	
1/8/1962		Western Michigan	W 82–81	4–5 (2–1)	
1/13/1962		at Toledo	L 67–75	4–6 (2–2)	
1/17/1962		at Miami (OH)	W 78–75	5–6 (3–2)	
1/20/1962		at Kent State	W 83–66	6–6 (4–2)	
1/23/1962*		Muskingum	W 83–68	7–6	
1/30/1962*		Loyola (IL)	L 75–93	7-7	
2/3/1962*		at Youngstown State	W 63–58	8-7	
2/7/1962*		Morehead State	W 87–73	9–7	
2/10/1962		Kent State	W 79–70	10–7 (5–2)	
2/13/1962		Marshall	L 72–77	10–8 (5–3)	
2/17/1962		at No. 10 Bowling Green	L 58–83	10–9 (5–4)	
2/21/1962		Miami	W 83–71	11–9 (6–4)	
2/24/1962		Toledo	W 83–72	12–9 (7–4)	
2/28/1962*		Louisville	L 86–95	12–10	
3/3/1962*		Western Michigan	W 91–85	13–10 (8–4)	
*Non-conference game. ^{#}Rankings from AP Poll. (#) Tournament seedings in parentheses. All times are in Eastern Time.

== Statistics ==
=== Team statistics ===
Final 1961–62 statistics

Record	Ohio	OPP
Scoring	1687	1686
Scoring Average	73.35	73.30
Field goals – Att	660–1581	650–1516
Free throws – Att	367–545	386–560
Rebounds	1110	1029
Assists		
Turnovers		
Steals		
Blocked Shots		

=== Player statistics ===
			Minutes		Scoring		Total FGs			Free-Throws			Rebounds						
Player	GP	GS	Tot	Avg	Pts	Avg	FG	FGA	Pct	FT	FTA	Pct	Tot	Avg	A	PF	TO	Stl	Blk
Jerry Jackson	23	-			363	15.8	146	339	0.431	71	116	0.612	220	9.6		60			
Billy Whaley	23	-			311	13.5	114	294	0.388	83	119	0.697	92	4.0		61			
Dave Katz	23	-			286	12.4	119	260	0.458	48	60	0.800	69	3.0		47			
Paul Storey	23	-			284	12.3	115	242	0.475	54	73	0.740	169	7.3		48			
Stacy Bunton	23	-			236	10.3	89	221	0.403	58	86	0.674	191	8.3		86			
Gary Bolen		-																	
Charles Gill		-																	
Dave Roberts		-																	
_ Welles		-																	
Loren Wilcox		-																	
Total	23	-	-	-	1687	73.3	660	1581	0.417	367	545	0.673	1110	48.3		421			
Opponents	23	-	-	-	1686	73.3	650	1516	0.429	386	560	0.689	1029	44.7		406			

Legend
GP	Games played	GS	Games started	Avg	Average per game
FG	Field-goals made	FGA	Field-goal attempts	Off	Offensive rebounds
Def	Defensive rebounds	A	Assists	TO	Turnovers
Blk	Blocks	Stl	Steals	High	Team high
