= 1965–66 Ohio Bobcats men's basketball team =

American college basketball season

1965–66 Ohio Bobcats men's basketball
- Conference: Mid-American Conference
- Record: 13–10 (6–6 MAC)
- Head coach: Jim Snyder (17th season)
- Home arena: Grover Center

1965–66 Mid-American Conference men's basketball standings
	Conf.				Overall
Team	W		L	PCT	W		L	PCT
Miami (Ohio)	11	–	1	.917	18	–	7	.720
Toledo	8	–	4	.667	13	–	11	.542
Ohio	6	–	6	.500	13	–	10	.565
Bowling Green State	6	–	6	.500	9	–	15	.375
Marshall	4	–	8	.333	12	–	12	.500
Western Michigan	4	–	8	.333	8	–	14	.364
Kent State	3	–	9	.250	8	–	16	.333
Rankings from AP Poll

The 1965–66 Ohio Bobcats men's basketball team represented Ohio University as a member of the Mid-American Conference in the college basketball season of 1965–66. The team was coached by Jim Snyder and played their home games at Grover Center. The Bobcats finished with a record of 13–10 and finished third in the MAC regular season with a conference record of 6–6.

== Schedule ==
Date time, TV	Rank^{#}	Opponent^{#}	Result	Record	Site (attendance) city, state
Regular Season
12/1/1965*		DePauw	W 93–71	1–0	
12/4/1965*		at Northwestern	L 60–62	1–1	
12/6/1965*		Northern Illinois	W 102–64	2–1	
12/11/1965*		at Loyola (IL)	L 78–96	2–2	
12/13/1965*		at Purdue	W 74–73	3–2 (0–1)	
12/15/1965*		San Francisco State	W 102–62	4–2	
12/18/1966*		at Miami (FL)	L 100–105	4–3	
12/21/1965*		at Davidson	L 63–96	4–4	
12/30/1965*		Brown	W 90–52	5–4	
MAC regular season
1/5/1966		at Western Michigan	L 80–86	5–5 (0–1)	
1/12/1966		Miami (OH)	L 56–68	5–6 (0–2)	
1/15/1966		at Marshall	L 68–79	5–7 (0–3)	
1/17/1966*		Seattle	W 84–73	6–7	
1/22/1966		Western Michigan	W 96–86	7-7 (1–3)	
1/29/1966		at Kent State	W 67–65	8-7 (2–3)	
2/1/1966*		at Muskingum	W 70–59	9–7	
2/5/1966		Bowling Green	W 95–87 ^{2OT}	10–7 (3–3)	
2/9/1966		at Miami (OH)	L 55–70	10–8 (3–4)	
2/12/1966		at Toledo	L 54–67	10–9 (3–5)	
2/19/1966		Kent State	W 88–75	11–9 (4–5)	
2/22/1966		Marshall	W 92–78	12–9 (5–5)	
2/26/1966		at Bowling Green	L 78–90	12–10 (5–6)	
3/2/1966		Toledo	W 77–69	13–10 (6–6)	
*Non-conference game. ^{#}Rankings from AP Poll. (#) Tournament seedings in parentheses. All times are in Eastern Time.

== Statistics ==
=== Team statistics ===
Final 1965–66 statistics

Record	Ohio	OPP
Scoring	1830	1733
Scoring Average	79.57	75.35
Field goals – Att	759–1683	665–1564
Free throws – Att	392–612	403–574
Rebounds	1248	1026
Assists		
Turnovers		
Steals		
Blocked Shots		

=== Player statistics ===
			Minutes		Scoring		Total FGs			Free-Throws			Rebounds						
Player	GP	GS	Tot	Avg	Pts	Avg	FG	FGA	Pct	FT	FTA	Pct	Tot	Avg	A	PF	TO	Stl	Blk
Ken Fowlkes	20	-			322	16.1	128	263	0.487	66	94	0.702	210	10.5		72			
John Schroeder	23	-			285	12.4	109	259	0.421	67	135	0.496	273	11.9		71			
Dave Brown		-																	
Fred Cluff		-																	
_ Hamilton		-																	
Mike Hammond		-																	
Marshall Hatcher		-																	
_ Reichenbach		-																	
_ Spires		-																	
_ Williams		-																	
Total	23	-	-	-	1830	79.6	759	1683	0.451	392	612	0.641	1248	54.3		462			
Opponents	23	-	-	-	1733	75.3	665	1564	0.425	403	574	0.702	1026	44.6		460			

Legend
GP	Games played	GS	Games started	Avg	Average per game
FG	Field-goals made	FGA	Field-goal attempts	Off	Offensive rebounds
Def	Defensive rebounds	A	Assists	TO	Turnovers
Blk	Blocks	Stl	Steals	High	Team high
