= 1967–68 Ohio Bobcats men's basketball team =

American college basketball season

1967–68 Ohio Bobcats men's basketball
- Conference: Mid-American Conference
- Record: 7–16 (3–9 MAC)
- Head coach: Jim Snyder (19th season)
- Home arena: Grover Center

1967–68 Mid-American Conference men's basketball standings
	Conf.				Overall
Team	W		L	PCT	W		L	PCT
Bowling Green State	10	–	2	.833	18	–	7	.720
Marshall	9	–	3	.750	17	–	8	.680
Toledo	8	–	4	.667	16	–	8	.667
Western Michigan	5	–	7	.417	11	–	13	.458
Miami (Ohio)	4	–	8	.333	11	–	12	.478
Kent State	3	–	9	.250	9	–	15	.375
Ohio	3	–	9	.250	7	–	16	.304
Rankings from AP Poll

The 1967–68 Ohio Bobcats men's basketball team represented Ohio University as a member of the Mid-American Conference in the college basketball season of 1967–68. The team was coached by Jim Snyder and played their home games at Grover Center. The Bobcats finished with a record of 7–16 and finished sixth in the MAC regular season with a conference record of 3–9.

== Schedule ==
Date time, TV	Rank^{#}	Opponent^{#}	Result	Record	Site (attendance) city, state
Regular Season
12/2/1967*		Northwestern	W 71–70	1–0	
12/5/1967*		Otterbein	W 81–59	2–0	
12/9/1967*		at Indiana	L 63–80	2–1	
12/11/1967*		at Purdue	L 66–78	2–2	
12/15/1967*		at Seattle	L 68–76	2–3	
12/19/1967*		at Portland	W 67–65	3–3	
12/20/1968*		at Idaho	L 64–78	3–4	
12/22/1967*		at Minnesota	L 63–73	3–5	
1/2/1968*		Virginia Tech	L 65–74	3–6	
MAC regular season
1/6/1968		Western Michigan	L 84–86	3–7 (0–1)	
1/13/1968		at Marshall	L 69–94	3–8 (0–2)	
1/17/1968		at Western Michigan	L 79–83	3–9 (0–3)	
1/20/1968*		at Toledo	L 66–74	3–10 (0–4)	
1/24/1968		Marshall	L 73–82	3-11 (0–5)	
1/27/1968		at Kent State	L 56–68	3-12 (0–6)	
1/30/1968*		at Loyola (IL)	L 68–109	3–13	
2/3/1968		at Miami (OH)	L 82–84	3–14 (0–7)	
2/7/1968		Bowling Green	L 68–78	3–15 (0–8)	
2/10/1968		Kent State	W 67–62	4–15 (1–8)	
2/12/1968*		Northern Illinois	W 85–76	5–15	
2/17/1968		Miami (OH)	W 70–68	6–15 (2–8)	
2/24/1968		Toledo	W 74–72	7–15 (3–8)	
3/2/1968		at Bowling Green	L 63–84	7–16 (3–9)	
*Non-conference game. ^{#}Rankings from AP Poll. (#) Tournament seedings in parentheses. All times are in Eastern Time.

== Statistics ==
=== Team statistics ===
Final 1967–68 statistics

Record	Ohio	OPP
Scoring	1612	1782
Scoring Average	70.09	77.48
Field goals – Att	641–1597	694–1572
Free throws – Att	330–499	394–546
Rebounds	1096	1059
Assists		
Turnovers		
Steals		
Blocked Shots		

=== Player statistics ===
			Minutes		Scoring		Total FGs			Free-Throws			Rebounds						
Player	GP	GS	Tot	Avg	Pts	Avg	FG	FGA	Pct	FT	FTA	Pct	Tot	Avg	A	PF	TO	Stl	Blk
Gerald McKee	21	-			419	20.0	172	395	0.435	75	105	0.714	203	9.7		53			
John Canine	23	-			264	11.5	114	300	0.380	34	50	0.680	73	3.2		55			
Greg McDivitt	23	-			240	10.4	90	212	0.425	60	92	0.652	177	7.7		84			
Mark McClintick	12	-			178	14.8	72	161	0.447	34	43	0.791	82	6.8		35			
Fred Cluff	16	-			163	10.2	61	150	0.407	41	68	0.603	112	7.0		37			
Doug Parker	23	-			145	6.3	51	135	0.378	43	74	0.581	116	5.0		65			
Wayne Young	22	-			100	4.5	41	127	0.323	16	23	0.696	59	2.7		14			
Larry Coon	23	-			44	1.9	19	56	0.339	6	12	0.500	54	2.3		39			
Marshall Hatcher	18	-			38	2.1	15	30	0.500	8	13	0.615	19	1.1		12			
Steve Battle	21	-			23	1.1	6	30	0.200	11	15	0.733	28	1.3		21			
_ Szabo	2	-			2	1.0	0	0	0.000	2	2	1.000	3	1.5		0			
John Glancy	9	-			0	0.0	0	1	0.000	0	2	0.000	3	0.3		0			
Total	23	-	-	-	1612	70.1	641	1597	0.401	330	499	0.661	1096	47.7		415			
Opponents	23	-	-	-	1782	77.5	694	1572	0.441	394	546	0.722	1059	46.0		387			

Legend
GP	Games played	GS	Games started	Avg	Average per game
FG	Field-goals made	FGA	Field-goal attempts	Off	Offensive rebounds
Def	Defensive rebounds	A	Assists	TO	Turnovers
Blk	Blocks	Stl	Steals	High	Team high
