= 1920–21 Ohio Bobcats men's basketball team =

American college basketball season

1920–21 Ohio Bobcats men's basketball

OAC Champions
- Conference: Ohio Athletic Conference
- Record: 15–2 (6–1 OAC)
- Head coach: Russ Finsterwald (1st season)
- Home arena: Ohio Gymnasium

The 1920–21 Ohio Bobcats men's basketball team represented Ohio University. Russ Finsterwald was the head coach for Ohio. The Bobcats played their home games in Ohio Gymnasium.

== Schedule ==
Date time, TV	Rank^{#}	Opponent^{#}	Result	Record	Site (attendance) city, state
Regular Season
*		at Xavier	W 54–13	1–0	Fenwick Club; Cincinnati, OH
		at Miami (OH)	W 25–23	2–0	Oxford, OH
*		Capital	W 38–18	3–0	Ohio Gymnasium; Athens, OH
		at Cincinnati	W 28–13	4–0	Schmidlapp Gymnasium; Cincinnati, OH
*		at Marietta	W 18–15	5–0	Marietta, OH
		at Kenyon	W 34–22	6–0	Gambier, OH
*		Otterbein	W 46–13	7–0	Ohio Gymnasium; Athens, OH
*		Athens High School	W 33–16	8–0	Ohio Gymnasium; Athens, OH
*		Marshall	W 56–9	9–0	Ohio Gymnasium; Athens, OH
*		Camp Sherman	W 61–18	10–0	Ohio Gymnasium; Athens, OH
*		at Capital	L 24–27	10–1	Bexley, OH
		Kenyon	W 53–20	11–1	Athens, OH
*		at Otterbein	W 46–19	12–1	Ohio Gymnasium; Athens, OH
		at Denison	L 23–25	12–2	Granville, OH
		Miami (OH)	W 36–16	13–2	Ohio Gymnasium; Athens, OH
*		Marietta	W 19–17	14–2	Ohio Gymnasium; Athens, OH
		Wittenberg	W 28–18	15–2	Ohio Gymnasium; Athens, OH
*Non-conference game. ^{#}Rankings from AP Poll. (#) Tournament seedings in parentheses. All times are in Eastern Time.
