= 1957–58 Ohio Bobcats men's basketball team =

American college basketball season

1957–58 Ohio Bobcats men's basketball
- Conference: Mid-American Conference
- Record: 16–8 (7–5 MAC)
- Head coach: Jim Snyder (9th season)
- Home arena: Men's Gymnasium

1957–58 Mid-American Conference men's basketball standings
	Conf.				Overall
Team	W		L	PCT	W		L	PCT
Miami	12	–	0	1.000	18	–	9	.667
Marshall	9	–	3	.750	17	–	7	.708
Ohio	7	–	5	.583	16	–	8	.667
Bowling Green	6	–	6	.500	15	–	8	.652
Toledo	4	–	8	.333	9	–	14	.391
Kent State	3	–	9	.250	9	–	14	.391
Western Michigan	1	–	11	.083	5	–	19	.208
Rankings from AP Poll

The 1957–58 Ohio Bobcats men's basketball team represented Ohio University as a member of the Mid-American Conference in the college basketball season of 1957–58. The team was coached by Jim Snyder and played their home games at the Men's Gymnasium. The Bobcats finished the regular season with a record of 16–8 and finished third in the MAC regular season with a conference record of 7–5.

== Schedule ==
Date time, TV	Rank^{#}	Opponent^{#}	Result	Record	Site (attendance) city, state
Regular Season
12/2/1957*		at Indiana	W 76–68	1–0	
12/5/1957*		Marietta	W 92–71	2–0	
12/7/1957*		at Morehead State	L 60–78	2–1	
12/14/1957		at Bowling Green	L 60–65	2–2 (0–1)	
12/17/1957*		at Dayton	L 41–58	2–3	
12/19/1957*		at Nebraska	L 53–61	2–4	
12/30/1957*		vs. Washington & Lee; All-American City Tournament	W 65–64	3–4	
12/31/1957*		vs. Kentucky Wesleyan; All-American City Tournament	W 83–70	4–4	
1/4/1958*		Wittenberg	W 70–56	5–4	
MAC regular season
1/10/1958		Kent State	W 58–54	6–4 (1–1)	
1/14/1958		at Miami (OH)	L 66–75	6–5 (1–2)	
1/18/1958		at Western Michigan	W 76–66	7–5 (2–2)	
1/20/1958		at Toledo	W 69–66	8–5 (3–2)	
1/23/1958*		Morehead State	W 71–57	9–5	
1/25/1958		Marshall	L 78–81 ^{OT}	9–6 (3–3)	
2/1/1958		at Kent State	W 65–58	10–-6 (4–3)	
2/3/1958*		Florida State	W 86–66	11–6 (4–3)	
2/5/1958		at Marshall	L 89–98	11–7 (4–4)	
2/8/1958		Western Michigan	W 116–87	12–7 (5–4)	
2/12/1958*		Xavier	W 87–74	13–7	
2/15/1958		Bowling Green	W 84–82 ^{OT}	14–7 (6–4)	
2/17/1958		Toledo	W 82–61	15–7 (7–4)	
2/19/1958		Miami (OH)	L 72–86	15–8 (7–5)	
3/1/1958*		at Marietta	W 80–76	16–8	
*Non-conference game. ^{#}Rankings from AP Poll. (#) Tournament seedings in parentheses. All times are in Eastern Time.

== Statistics ==
=== Team statistics ===
Final 1957–58 statistics

Record	Ohio	OPP
Scoring	1779	1678
Scoring Average	74.13	69.92
Field goals – Att	667–1671	622–1651
Free throws – Att	445–662	434–637
Rebounds	1166	1066
Assists		
Turnovers		
Steals		
Blocked Shots		

=== Player statistics ===
			Minutes		Scoring		Total FGs			Free-Throws			Rebounds						
Player	GP	GS	Tot	Avg	Pts	Avg	FG	FGA	Pct	FT	FTA	Pct	Tot	Avg	A	PF	TO	Stl	Blk
Bob Peterson	24	-			298	12.4	116	265	0.438	66	85	0.776	216	9.0		76			
Dave Scott	24	-			291	12.1	118	310	0.381	55	87	0.632	287	12.0		63			
Larry Williams	24	-			263	11.0	95	211	0.450	73	101	0.723	82	3.4		53			
Bob Anderson	24	-			254	10.6	91	253	0.360	72	106	0.679	99	4.1		71			
Jerry Wolf	24	-			216	9.0	91	229	0.397	34	50	0.680	134	5.6		45			
Dick Norman	24	-			155	6.5	50	121	0.413	55	71	0.775	38	1.6		20			
John Tudor	23	-			138	6.0	47	118	0.398	44	74	0.595	115	5.0		42			
Dale Bandy	18	-			77	4.3	25	60	0.417	27	47	0.574	26	1.4		28			
Verlynn Witte	15	-			38	2.5	16	42	0.381	6	14	0.429	49	3.3		29			
Russ Grooms	19	-			19	1.0	7	30	0.233	5	12	0.417	25	1.3		17			
Bruce Johnson	15	-			16	1.3	7	12	0.583	2	5	0.400	4	2.3		7			
Bob Gaunt	11	-			14	1.1	4	19	0.211	6	10	0.600	25	0.3		10			
Total	24	-	-	-	1779	74.1	667	1671	0.399	445	662	0.672	1166	48.6		451			
Opponents	24	-	-	-	1678	69.9	622	1651	0.377	434	637	0.681	1066	44.4		466			

Legend
GP	Games played	GS	Games started	Avg	Average per game
FG	Field-goals made	FGA	Field-goal attempts	Off	Offensive rebounds
Def	Defensive rebounds	A	Assists	TO	Turnovers
Blk	Blocks	Stl	Steals	High	Team high
