= Dutch Trautwein =

American college basketball coach

Biographical details
- Education: Wittenberg University

Coaching career (HC unless noted)
- 1928–1938: Ohio (assist.)
- 1938–1949: Ohio

Head coaching record
- Overall: 136–90

William "Dutch" Trautwein was an American former college basketball coach. He was a football and basketball player at Wittenberg, where he is a member of the school's athletics hall of fame. He was an assistant football coach at Wittenberg for five years before joining the coaching staff at Ohio for football, basketball, and baseball in 1928. He was named the Ohio Basketball head coach in 1938 where he remained for 11 years. He compiled 136–90 record at Ohio. His 1941 team finished the season as the runner up in the 1941 NIT. Jim Snyder, Ohio's coaching wins leader, played basketball for Trautwien when Snyder was a player at Ohio and he was then an assistant under Trautwein from 1946 to 1949. The field at Bob Wren Stadium used for Ohio baseball is named in his honor.

== Head coaching record ==
Record table
| Season | Team | Overall | Conference | Standing | Postseason |
|---|---|---|---|---|---|
Ohio Bobcats (Buckeye Athletic Association) (1938–1939)
| 1938–39 | Ohio | 12–8 | 4–4 | | |
Ohio Bobcats (Independent) (1939–1946)
| 1939–40 | Ohio | 19–6 | | | |
| 1940–41 | Ohio | 18–4 | | | NIT finals |
| 1941–42 | Ohio | 12–9 | | | |
| 1942–43 | Ohio | 11–7 | | | |
| 1943–44 | Ohio | 9–7 | | | |
| 1944–45 | Ohio | 11–8 | | | |
| 1945–46 | Ohio | 15–5 | | | |
Ohio Bobcats (Mid-American Conference) (1946–1949)
| 1946–47 | Ohio | 13–10 | 5–3 | 3rd | |
| 1947–48 | Ohio | 10–10 | 4–4 | 3rd | |
| 1948–49 | Ohio | 6–16 | 2–8 | 6th | |
| Ohio: | | 136–90 (.602) | 11–15 (.423) | | |
| Total: | | 136–90 (.602) | | | |
National champion Postseason invitational champion Conference regular season champion Conference regular season and conference tournament champion Division regular season champion Division regular season and conference tournament champion Conference tournament champion
