= 1952–53 Ohio Bobcats men's basketball team =

American college basketball season

1952–53 Ohio Bobcats men's basketball
- Record: 9–13 (4–8 )
- Head coach: Jim Snyder (4th season)
- Home arena: Men's Gymnasium

1952–53 Mid-American Conference men's basketball standings
	Conf.				Overall
Team	W		L	PCT	W		L	PCT
Miami (Ohio)	10	–	2	.833	17	–	6	.739
Toledo	9	–	3	.750	16	–	7	.696
Cincinnati	9	–	3	.750	11	–	13	.458
Western Michigan	6	–	6	.500	12	–	9	.571
Ohio	4	–	8	.333	9	–	13	.409
Kent State	3	–	9	.250	7	–	15	.318
Western Reserve	1	–	11	.083	5	–	17	.227
Rankings from AP Poll

The 1952–53 Ohio Bobcats men's basketball team represented Ohio University in the college basketball season of 1952–53. The team was coached by Jim Snyder in his fourth season as Ohio's head coach. They played their home games at the Men's Gymnasium. They finished the season 9–13. They finished fifth in the Mid-American Conference with a conference record of 4–8.

== Schedule ==
Date time, TV	Rank^{#}	Opponent^{#}	Result	Record	Site (attendance) city, state
Regular Season
*		Marietta	L 67–68	0–1	
*		Ohio Wesleyan	L 64–65	0–2	
		Kent State	W 85–68	1–2 (1–0)	
*		at Pittsburgh	L 66–68	1–3	
*		at Washington & Jefferson	L 59–74	1–4	
MAC regular season
		at Western Reserve	W 99–70	2–4 (2–0)	
		at Kent State	W 90–89	3–4 (3–0)	
		Miami	L 66–89	3–5 (3–1)	
*		Denison	W 90–74	4–5	
*		at Muskingum	W 67–59	5–5	
		Toledo	W 74–63	6–5 (4–1)	
*		Bowling Green	W 71–58	7–5	
		at Cincinnati	L 64–78	7–6 (4–2)	
		at Miami (OH)	L 56–82	7–7 (4–3)	
		Western Reserve	L 77–78	7–8 (4–4)	
		Western Michigan	L 63–70	7–9 (4–5)	
*		Marshall	W 91–87	8–9	
		at Toledo	L 68–94	8–10 (4–6)	
		Cincinnati	L 73–75	8–11 (4–7)	
		at Western Michigan	L 55–62	8–12 (4–8)	
*		at Marietta	W 79–77	9–12	
*		at Marshall	L 75–77	9–13	
*Non-conference game. ^{#}Rankings from AP Poll. (#) Tournament seedings in parentheses. All times are in Eastern Time.

== Statistics ==
=== Team statistics ===
Final 1952–53 statistics

Record	Ohio	OPP
Scoring	1599	1625
Scoring Average	72.68	73.86
Field goals – Att	577–1616	587–1685
Free throws – Att	445–701	451–760
Rebounds	1174	969
Assists		
Turnovers		
Steals		
Blocked Shots		

=== Player statistics ===
			Minutes		Scoring		Total FGs			Free-Throws			Rebounds						
Player	GP	GS	Tot	Avg	Pts	Avg	FG	FGA	Pct	FT	FTA	Pct	Tot	Avg	A	PF	TO	Stl	Blk
Jim Betts	22	-			400	18.2	137	369	0.371	126	188	0.670	310	14.1		75			
Lou Sawchik	22	-			304	13.8	119	300	0.397	66	98	0.673	297	13.5		72			
Dick Murphy	22	-			239	10.9	94	279	0.337	51	73	0.699	146	6.6		83			
Ray Griesheimer	11	-			157	14.3	60	140	0.429	37	63	0.587	99	9.0		42			
Ralph Readout	18	-			157	8.7	51	141	0.362	55	88	0.625	72	4.0		35			
Bob Strawser	22	-			125	5.7	42	136	0.309	41	67	0.612	61	2.8		46			
Dan Lechner	14	-			56	4.0	22	62	0.355	12	26	0.462	28	2.0		17			
Harold Daugherty	21	-			52	2.5	16	54	0.296	20	38	0.526	29	1.4		45			
Jerry Barry	16	-			43	2.7	15	51	0.294	13	26	0.500	29	1.8		29			
John Kornick	8	-			24	3.0	8	31	0.258	8	10	0.800	15	1.9		11			
Dick Seiple	8	-			19	2.4	6	20	0.300	7	8	0.875	6	0.8		19			
John Dunnette	4	-			8	2.0	2	4	0.500	4	5	0.800	7	1.8		6			
Carl Racketa	5	-			7	1.4	2	9	0.222	3	6	0.500	3	0.6		2			
Bob Buell	3	-			6	2.0	3	10	0.300	0	2	0.000	3	1.0		4			
Nate Reynard	4	-			2	0.5	0	0	0.000	2	3	0.667	1	0.3		1			
Total	22	-	-	-	1599	72.7	577	1616	0.357	445	701	0.635	1174	53.4		487			
Opponents	22	-	-	-	1625	73.9	587	1685	0.348	451	760	0.593	969	44.0		458			

Legend
GP	Games played	GS	Games started	Avg	Average per game
FG	Field-goals made	FGA	Field-goal attempts	Off	Offensive rebounds
Def	Defensive rebounds	A	Assists	TO	Turnovers
Blk	Blocks	Stl	Steals	High	Team high
