= 1921–22 Ohio Bobcats men's basketball team =

American college basketball season

1921–22 Ohio Bobcats men's basketball
- Conference: Ohio Athletic Conference
- Record: 19–4 (11–2 OAC)
- Head coach: Russ Finsterwald (2nd season)
- Home arena: Ohio Gymnasium

The 1921–22 Ohio Bobcats men's basketball team represented Ohio University. Russ Finsterwald was the head coach for Ohio. The Bobcats played their home games in Ohio Gymnasium.

== Schedule ==
Date time, TV	Rank^{#}	Opponent^{#}	Result	Record	Site (attendance) city, state
Regular Season
*		Bowling Green	W 41–19	1–0	Ohio Gymnasium; Athens, OH
*		Bowling Green	W 38–11	2–0	Ohio Gymnasium; Athens, OH
*		at Baldwin Wallace	W 36–14	3–0	Berea, OH
*		at Syracuse Collegians	L 14–21	3–1	Syracuse, NY
*		at Rochester Collegians	L 18–40	3–2	Rochester, NY
*		Wilmington	W 35–18	4–2	Ohio Gymnasium; Athens, OH
*		Wilmington	W 36–18	5–2	Ohio Gymnasium; Athens, OH
		at Cincinnati	L 11–20	5–3	Schmidlapp Gymnasium; Cincinnati, OH
		at Xavier	W 28–16	6–3	Fenwick Club; Cincinnati, OH
*		Capital	W 43–7	7–3	Ohio Gymnasium; Athens, OH
		Ohio Northern	W 45–13	8–3	Ohio Gymnasium; Athens, OH
*		at Marietta	W 29–13	9–3	Marietta, OH
		at Mount Union	W 28–20	10–3	Alliance, OH
		at Western Reserve	W 36–28	11–3	Cleveland, OH
		Xavier	W 34–32	12–3	Ohio Gymnasium; Athens, OH
		Cincinnati	W 33–13	13–3	Ohio Gymnasium; Athens, OH
		at Ohio Northern	W 28–27	14–3	Ada, OH
		at Heidelberg	W 33–12	15–3	Tiffin, OH
*		Marietta	W 39–12	16–3	Ohio Gymnasium; Athens, OH
		Mount Union	W 38–24	17–3	Ohio Gymnasium; Athens, OH
		Kenyon	W 48–16	18–3	Ohio Gymnasium; Athens, OH
		at Denison	L 25–29	18–4	Granville, OH
		Denison	W 36–16	19–4	Ohio Gymnasium; Athens, OH
*Non-conference game. ^{#}Rankings from AP Poll. (#) Tournament seedings in parentheses. All times are in Eastern Time.
