= 1972–73 Ohio Bobcats men's basketball team =

American college basketball season

1972–73 Ohio Bobcats men's basketball
- Conference: Mid-American Conference
- Record: 16–10 (6–5 MAC)
- Head coach: Jim Snyder (24th season)
- Home arena: Convocation Center

1972–73 Mid-American Conference men's basketball standings
	Conf.				Overall
Team	W		L	PCT	W		L	PCT
Miami (Ohio)	9	–	2	.818	18	–	9	.667
Toledo	7	–	5	.583	15	–	11	.577
Bowling Green State	7	–	5	.583	13	–	13	.500
Ohio	6	–	5	.545	16	–	10	.615
Kent State	5	–	7	.417	10	–	16	.385
Central Michigan	4	–	6	.400	13	–	13	.500
Western Michigan	2	–	10	.167	8	–	18	.308
Rankings from AP Poll

The 1972–73 Ohio Bobcats men's basketball team represented Ohio University as a member of the Mid-American Conference in the college basketball season of 1972–73. The team was coached by Jim Snyder and played their home games at Convocation Center. The Bobcats finished with a record of 16–10 and finished fourth in the MAC regular season with a conference record of 6–5.

== Schedule ==
Date time, TV	Rank^{#}	Opponent^{#}	Result	Record	Site (attendance) city, state
Regular Season
11/25/1972*		at Missouri	L 75–87	0–1	
11/28/1972		Central Michigan	W 86–84 ^{OT}	1–1 (1–0)	
12/2/1972*		at Youngstown State	W 68–59	2–1	
12/9/1972*		at Northwestern	W 74–69	3–1	
12/16/1972*		at No. 15 Indiana	L 68–89	3–2	
12/18/1972*		at Loyola (IL)	W 95–88	4–2	
12/21/1972*		at Ohio State	L 80–112	4–3	
12/29/1972*		vs. Southern Illinois; Razorback Invitational	W 78–77 ^{OT}	5–3	
12/30/1972*		vs. Cornell; Razorback Invitational	W 100–66	6–3	
1/3/1973*		Valparaiso	W 86–68	7–3	
MAC regular season
1/6/1973		at Toledo	L 55–72	7–4 (1–1)	
1/9/1973*		Marietta	W 87–31	8–4	
1/13/1973		Miami (OH)	L 79–80 ^{OT}	8–5 (1–2)	
1/16/1973*		at Eastern Michigan	W 89–73	9–5	
1/20/1973		at Western Michigan	L 67–68	9-6 (1–3)	
1/27/1973		at Bowling Green	W 86–68	10–6 (2–3)	
1/31/1973		Kent State	W 74–64	11–6 (3–3)	
2/3/1973		Toledo	W 62–61	12–6 (3–4)	
2/6/1973*		at Ball State	W 81–75	13–6	
2/10/1973		at Miami (OH)	L 65–69	13–7 (3–5)	
2/14/1973*		Cincinnati	L 78–79	13–8	
2/17/1973		Western Michigan	W 101–80	14–8 (4–5)	
2/20/1973*		Wisconsin	L 68–82	14–9	
2/24/1973		Bowling Green	W 102–57	15–9 (5–5)	
2/27/1973*		Cleveland State	W 98–76	16–9	
3/3/1973		at Kent State	L 71–75	16–10 (6–5)	
*Non-conference game. ^{#}Rankings from AP Poll. (#) Tournament seedings in parentheses. All times are in Eastern Time.

== Statistics ==
=== Team statistics ===
Final 1972–73 statistics

Record	Ohio	OPP
Scoring	2073	1907
Scoring Average	79.73	73.35
Field goals – Att	848–1979	772–1990
Free throws – Att	377–546	363–520
Rebounds	1356	1306
Assists		
Turnovers		
Steals		
Blocked Shots		

=== Player statistics ===
			Minutes		Scoring		Total FGs			Free-Throws			Rebounds						
Player	GP	GS	Tot	Avg	Pts	Avg	FG	FGA	Pct	FT	FTA	Pct	Tot	Avg	A	PF	TO	Stl	Blk
George Green	26	-			367	14.1	142	319	0.445	83	120	0.692	181	7.0		84			
Walter Luckett	26	-			351	13.5	148	332	0.446	55	78	0.705	77	3.0		54			
Dave Ball	26	-			341	13.1	141	326	0.433	59	85	0.694	191	7.3		52			
Bill Brown	26	-			304	11.7	132	287	0.460	40	51	0.784	148	5.7		50			
Denny Rusch	24	-			264	11.0	101	222	0.455	61	96	0.635	175	7.3		75			
Scott Love	23	-			165	7.2	73	157	0.465	19	27	0.704	94	4.1		56			
Denny Thompson	23	-			101	4.4	42	96	0.438	17	19	0.895	29	1.3		25			
Alan Talbert	25	-			59	2.4	26	90	0.289	7	11	0.636	26	1.0		59			
Bob Huggins	18	-			41	2.3	15	48	0.313	11	18	0.611	16	0.9		19			
Tom Hester	17	-			18	1.1	5	28	0.179	8	16	0.500	29	1.7		25			
Earl Jones	9	-			17	1.9	5	18	0.278	7	12	0.583	17	1.9		9			
Total	26	-	-	-	2073	79.7	848	1979	0.428	377	546	0.690	1356	52.2		529			
Opponents	26	-	-	-	1907	73.3	772	1990	0.388	363	520	0.698	1306	50.2		532			

Legend
GP	Games played	GS	Games started	Avg	Average per game
FG	Field-goals made	FGA	Field-goal attempts	Off	Offensive rebounds
Def	Defensive rebounds	A	Assists	TO	Turnovers
Blk	Blocks	Stl	Steals	High	Team high
