= 1951–52 Ohio Bobcats men's basketball team =

American college basketball season

1951–52 Ohio Bobcats men's basketball
- Record: 12–12 (6–6 )
- Head coach: Jim Snyder (3rd season)
- Home arena: Men's Gymnasium

1951–52 Mid-American Conference men's basketball standings
	Conf.				Overall
Team	W		L	PCT	W		L	PCT
Miami (Ohio)	9	–	3	.750	19	–	6	.760
Western Michigan	9	–	3	.750	16	–	8	.667
Toledo	8	–	4	.667	20	–	11	.645
Ohio	6	–	6	.500	12	–	12	.500
Cincinnati	5	–	5	.500	11	–	16	.407
Kent State	3	–	7	.300	14	–	10	.583
Western Reserve	0	–	12	.000	1	–	23	.042
Rankings from AP Poll

The 1951–52 Ohio Bobcats men's basketball team represented Ohio University in the college basketball season of 1951–52. The team was coached by Jim Snyder in his third season as Ohio's head coach. They played their home games at the Men's Gymnasium. They finished the season 12–12. They finished fourth in the Mid-American Conference with a conference record of 6–6.

== Schedule ==
Date time, TV	Rank^{#}	Opponent^{#}	Result	Record	Site (attendance) city, state
Regular Season
*		Marshall	W 71–61	1–0	
		vs. Miami (OH)	L 59–79	1–1 (0–1)	
*		Marietta	W 73–63	2–1	
*		Ohio Wesleyan	W 87–57	3–1	
		at Kent State	L 73–75	3–2 (1–1)	
*		at Lake Forest	L 57–62	3–3	
*		at Beloit	L 62–69	3–4	
MAC regular season
		Western Reserve	W 67–48	4–4 (2–1)	
		Kent State	W 65–55	5–4 (3–1)	
*		at No. 20 Dayton	L 71–101	5–5	
		Miami	W 74–72	6–5 (4–1)	
		Cincinnati	W 78–66	7–5 (5–1)	
*		at Bowling Green	L 74–90	7–6	
		at Toledo	W 71–66	8–6 (6–1)	
		Western Michigan	L 60–65	8–7 (6–2)	
		at Cincinnati	L 66–82	8–8 (6–3)	
		at Miami (OH)	L 82–87	8–9 (6–4)	
		at Western Reserve	W 79–56	9–9	
*		Washington & Jefferson	W 89–80	10–9	
		Toledo	L 56–62	10–10 (6–5)	
*		Muskingum	W 97–55	11–10	
		at Western Michigan	L 74–85	11–11 (6–6)	
*		at Marietta	W 81–74	12–11	
*		at Marshall	L 91–94	12–12	
*Non-conference game. ^{#}Rankings from AP Poll. (#) Tournament seedings in parentheses. All times are in Eastern Time.

== Statistics ==
=== Team statistics ===
Final 1951–52 statistics

Record	Ohio	OPP
Scoring	1742	1704
Scoring Average	72.58	71.00
Field goals – Att	671–1950	667–1868
Free throws – Att	400–623	370–623
Rebounds	127	1034
Assists	253	199
Turnovers		
Steals		
Blocked Shots		

=== Player statistics ===
			Minutes		Scoring		Total FGs			Free-Throws			Rebounds						
Player	GP	GS	Tot	Avg	Pts	Avg	FG	FGA	Pct	FT	FTA	Pct	Tot	Avg	A	PF	TO	Stl	Blk
Glen Hursey	24	-			371	15.5	134	383	0.350	103	143	0.720	194	8.1		45			
Jim Betts	24	-			279	11.6	105	265	0.396	69	101	0.683	222	9.3		69			
Elwood Sparks	24	-			272	11.3	106	322	0.329	60	85	0.706	86	3.6		70			
Dick Murphy	24	-			207	8.6	87	241	0.361	33	57	0.579	126	5.3		76			
Jack Betts	24	-			163	6.8	65	209	0.311	33	54	0.611	174	7.3		57			
Dave Leightenheimer	23	-			122	5.3	45	143	0.315	32	46	0.696	90	3.9		64			
Ralph Readout	23	-			115	5.0	46	126	0.365	23	32	0.719	71	3.1		42			
Scotty Griesheimer	18	-			55	3.1	20	63	0.317	15	27	0.556	59	3.3		27			
Joe Benich	14	-			51	3.6	21	48	0.438	9	21	0.429	30	2.1		24			
Lou Sawchik	17	-			43	2.5	16	57	0.281	11	35	0.314	58	3.4		28			
Dan Lechner	16	-			30	1.9	14	45	0.311	2	4	0.500	17	1.1		15			
Tom Haswell	10	-			17	1.7	6	24	0.250	5	8	0.625	16	1.6		7			
Harold Daugherty	17	-			13	0.8	5	11	0.455	3	7	0.429	9	0.5		12			
Roger Crabtree	2	-			2	1.0	1	3	0.333	0	1	0.000	0	0.0		1			
Dick Seiple	3	-			1	0.3	0	10	0.000	2	2	1.000	3	1.0		3			
Total	24	-	-	-	1742	72.6	671	1950	0.344	400	623	0.642	127	5.3		540			
Opponents	24	-	-	-	1704	71.0	667	1868	0.357	370	623	0.594	1034	43.1	199	543			

Legend
GP	Games played	GS	Games started	Avg	Average per game
FG	Field-goals made	FGA	Field-goal attempts	Off	Offensive rebounds
Def	Defensive rebounds	A	Assists	TO	Turnovers
Blk	Blocks	Stl	Steals	High	Team high
