= 1960–61 Ohio Bobcats men's basketball team =

American college basketball season

1960–61 Ohio Bobcats men's basketball

MAC Regular Season champions

NCAA tournament, First Round
- Conference: Mid-American Conference
- Record: 17–7 (10–2 MAC)
- Head coach: Jim Snyder (12th season)
- Home arena: Grover Center

1960–61 Mid-American Conference men's basketball standings
	Conf.				Overall
Team	W		L	PCT	W		L	PCT
Ohio	10	–	2	.833	17	–	7	.708
Toledo	8	–	4	.667	15	–	8	.652
Miami (Ohio)	7	–	5	.583	12	–	12	.500
Marshall	5	–	7	.417	11	–	13	.458
Bowling Green State	4	–	8	.333	10	–	14	.417
Western Michigan	4	–	8	.333	10	–	14	.417
Kent State	4	–	8	.333	9	–	14	.391
Rankings from AP Poll

The 1960–61 Ohio Bobcats men's basketball team represented Ohio University as a member of the Mid-American Conference in the college basketball season of 1960–61. The team was coached by Jim Snyder and for the first time played their home games at the recently constructed Grover Center. The Bobcats finished the regular season with a record of 17–6 and won MAC regular season title with a conference record of 10–2. They received a bid to the NCAA tournament. There they lost to Louisville in the First Round.

== Schedule ==
Date time, TV	Rank^{#}	Opponent^{#}	Result	Record	Site (attendance) city, state
Regular Season
12/1/1960*		Ohio State	L 64–85	0–1	
12/3/1960*		Youngstown State	W 87–74	1–1	
12/6/1960*		at Morehead State	W 81–80	2–1	
12/10/1960*		at St. Francis (PA)	W 80–72	3–1	
12/14/1960		at Marshall	W 71–53	4–1 (1–0)	
12/16/1960*		at No. 7 St. John’s	L 50–78	4–2	
12/28/1960*		vs. South Dakota; Canton Invitational	W 75–56	5–2	
12/29/1960*		vs. Wittenberg; Canton Invitational	W 50–48	6–2	
MAC regular season
1/4/1960		Marshall	W 88–79	7–2 (2–0)	
1/7/1961		at Bowling Green	W 62–61	8–2 (3–0)	
1/10/1961*		DePaul	L 60–69	8–3	
1/14/1961		Western Michigan	W 64–62	9-3 (4–0)	
1/16/1961		Toledo	W 55–50	10–3 (5–0)	
1/21/1961*		Morehead State	W 87–71	11–3	
1/28/1961		at Western Michigan	W 78–76	12–3 (6–0)	
1/30/1961		at Kent State	W 89–85	13–3 (7–0)	
2/4/1961		at Toledo	L 68–95	13–4 (7–1)	
2/8/1961*		Miami (OH)	W 91–75	14–4 (8–1)	
2/11/1961		Kent State	W 102–92	15–4 (9–1)	
2/13/1961*		St. Francis (PA)	W 83–60	16–4	
2/15/1961*		at Louisville	L 84–117	16–5	
2/18/1961		Bowling Green	W 74–72	17–5 (10–1)	
2/23/1961		at Miami	L 79–101	17–6 (10–2)	
NCAA tournament
3/14/1961*		vs. Louisville	L 70–76	17–7	
*Non-conference game. ^{#}Rankings from AP Poll. (#) Tournament seedings in parentheses. All times are in Eastern Time.

== Statistics ==
=== Team statistics ===
Final 1960–61 statistics

Record	Ohio	OPP
Scoring	1792	1683
Scoring Average	74.67	70.13
Field goals – Att	708–1710	700–1683
Free throws – Att	376–593	387–558
Rebounds	1231	1143
Assists		
Turnovers		
Steals		
Blocked Shots		

=== Player statistics ===
			Minutes		Scoring		Total FGs			Free-Throws			Rebounds						
Player	GP	GS	Tot	Avg	Pts	Avg	FG	FGA	Pct	FT	FTA	Pct	Tot	Avg	A	PF	TO	Stl	Blk
Larry Kruger	24	-			447	18.6	184	404	0.455	79	105	0.752	193	8.0		55			
Bunk Adams	24	-			438	18.3	165	444	0.372	108	181	0.597	308	12.8		55			
Billy Whaley	24	-			331	13.8	123	289	0.426	85	130	0.654	94	3.9		68			
Stacy Bunton	24	-			195	8.1	82	171	0.480	31	56	0.554	223	9.3		78			
Dave Katz	24	-			180	7.5	77	185	0.416	26	34	0.765	61	2.5		56			
Gary Bolen	23	-			68	3.0	24	59	0.407	20	40	0.500	66	2.9		35			
Loren Wilcox	19	-			66	3.5	25	62	0.403	16	22	0.727	62	3.3		18			
Murray Cook	17	-			17	1.0	7	23	0.304	3	4	0.750	15	0.9		8			
Mike Schuler	24	-			15	0.6	6	36	0.167	3	3	1.000	12	0.5		10			
Jim Koon	21	-			14	0.7	6	21	0.286	2	4	0.500	8	0.4		8			
Ralph Ball	6	-			8	1.3	3	5	0.600	2	4	0.500	1	0.2		1			
Bob Rollinson	6	-			6	1.0	3	7	0.429	0	4	0.000	8	1.3		1			
Hugh Dalton		-			5		2	4	0.500	1	6	0.167	6			1			
Total	24	-	-	-	1792	74.7	708	1710	0.414	376	593	0.634	1231	51.3		394			
Opponents	24	-	-	-	1683	70.1	700	1683	0.416	387	558	0.694	1143	47.6		417			

Legend
GP	Games played	GS	Games started	Avg	Average per game
FG	Field-goals made	FGA	Field-goal attempts	Off	Offensive rebounds
Def	Defensive rebounds	A	Assists	TO	Turnovers
Blk	Blocks	Stl	Steals	High	Team high
