= Jerry McKee =

American basketball player (born 1946)

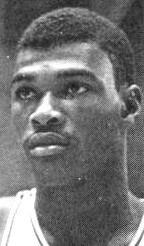

Personal information
- Born: August 4, 1946 (age 80)
- Listed height: 6 ft 3 in (1.91 m)
- Listed weight: 190 lb (86 kg)

Career information
- High school: Dunbar (Dayton, Ohio)
- College: Ohio (1966–1969)
- NBA draft: 1969: 11th round, 155th overall pick
- Drafted by: Baltimore Bullets
- Position: Guard
- Number: 23

Career history
- 1969: Indiana Pacers

Career highlights
- First-team All-MAC (1969); 2× Second-team All-MAC (1967, 1968)
- Stats at Basketball Reference

Gerald McKee (born August 4, 1946) is an American former basketball player. After an all-conference college career at Ohio University, he played briefly in the original American Basketball Association (ABA).

McKee, a 6'3 guard, played for Dunbar High School in Dayton, Ohio where in 1965 he was named to the All-Ohio team. He then chose to play college basketball for the Ohio University Bobcats. McKee was named to the All-Mid-American Conference team for each of his three seasons for the Bobcats, twice earning second-team honors and securing a first-team nod as a senior in 1969. For his career, McKee scored 1,310 points (an average of 18.7 points per game).

Following his college career, McKee was drafted in both the NBA and ABA drafts. The Baltimore Bullets chose him in the eleventh round of the 1969 NBA draft while the Indiana Pacers selected him from the ABA. McKee chose the Pacers, but his ABA career only lasted one game, as he recorded a missed shot and a turnover in three minutes of action on October 17, 1969, against the Miami Floridians. He later played minor league basketball for the International Basketball Association.
