= 1954–55 Ohio Bobcats men's basketball team =

American college basketball season

1954–55 Ohio Bobcats men's basketball
- Conference: Mid-American Conference
- Record: 16–5 (9–5 MAC)
- Head coach: Jim Snyder (6th season)
- Home arena: Men's Gymnasium

1954–55 Mid-American Conference men's basketball standings
	Conf.				Overall
Team	W		L	PCT	W		L	PCT
Miami (Ohio)	11	–	3	.786	14	–	9	.609
Marshall	10	–	4	.714	17	–	4	.810
Ohio	9	–	5	.643	16	–	5	.762
Western Michigan	9	–	5	.643	12	–	10	.545
Kent State	5	–	9	.357	8	–	14	.364
Bowling Green	5	–	9	.357	6	–	16	.273
Toledo	4	–	10	.286	5	–	17	.227
Western Reserve	3	–	11	.214	8	–	14	.364
Rankings from AP Poll

The 1954–55 Ohio Bobcats men's basketball team represented Ohio University as a member of the Mid-American Conference in the college basketball season of 1954–55. The team was coached by Jim Snyder and played their home games at the Men's Gymnasium. The Bobcats finished the regular season with a record of 16–5 and finished third in the MAC regular season with a conference record of 9–5.

== Schedule ==
Date time, TV	Rank^{#}	Opponent^{#}	Result	Record	Site (attendance) city, state
Regular Season
12/4/1954*		Marietta	W 81–75	1–0	
12/9/1954*		Charleston (WV)	W 88–81	2–0	
12/11/1954*		at Ohio Wesleyan	W 95–78	3–0	
MAC regular season
12/14/1954		Marshall	L 85–105	3–1 (0–1)	
12/17/1954		at Kent State	W 75–72	4–1 (1–1)	
12/18/1954		at Western Reserve	W 88–74	5–1 (2–1)	
12/20/1954*		at Loyola (IL)	W 72–70	6–1	
1/7/1955		Western Michigan	W 97–84	7–1 (3–1)	
1/15/1955		Kent State	W 80–65	8–1 (4–1)	
1/17/1955		Toledo	L 69–79	8–2 (4–2)	
1/22/1955		at Bowling Green	L 69–77	8–3 (4–3)	
1/29/1955		Miami (OH)	W 75–71	9–3 (5–3)	
2/5/1955*		at Case Tech	W 77–69	10–3	
2/9/1955		at Marshall	L 73–84	10–4 (5–4)	
2/11/1955		Western Reserve	W 86–68	11–4 (6–4)	
2/15/1955		at Miami (OH)	L 79–91	11–5 (6–5)	
2/18/1955		Bowling Green	W 81–70	12–5 (7–5)	
2/21/1955*		Morehead State	W 90–82	13–5	
2/26/1955		at Western Michigan	W 95–87	14–5 (8–5)	
2/28/1955		at Toledo	W 67–59	15–5 (9–5)	
3/3/1955*		at Marietta	W 93–90	16–5	
*Non-conference game. ^{#}Rankings from AP Poll. (#) Tournament seedings in parentheses. All times are in Eastern Time.

== Statistics ==
=== Team statistics ===
Final 1954–55 statistics

Record	Ohio	OPP
Scoring	1715	1631
Scoring Average	81.67	77.67
Field goals – Att	650–1631	570–1536
Free throws – Att	415–624	491–705
Rebounds	991	965
Assists		
Turnovers		
Steals		
Blocked Shots		

=== Player statistics ===
			Minutes		Scoring		Total FGs			Free-Throws			Rebounds						
Player	GP	GS	Tot	Avg	Pts	Avg	FG	FGA	Pct	FT	FTA	Pct	Tot	Avg	A	PF	TO	Stl	Blk
Fred Moore	21	-			327	15.6	140	342	0.409	47	66	0.712	469	22.3		58			
Dick Garrison	21	-			312	14.9	91	210	0.433	130	177	0.734	208	9.9		67			
Larry Morrison	21	-			220	10.5	84	236	0.356	52	72	0.722	78	3.7		47			
Bob Strawser	20	-			180	9.0	69	129	0.535	42	77	0.545	58	2.9		38			
Henry Pell	21	-			166	7.9	65	179	0.363	36	70	0.514	118	5.6		57			
Bob Evans	13	-			139	10.7	56	136	0.412	27	41	0.659	404	31.1		41			
Don Sifft	21	-			128	6.1	54	154	0.351	20	31	0.645	87	4.1		29			
Harry Weinbrecht	15	-			113	7.5	53	129	0.411	7	17	0.412	38	2.5		27			
Bill Oppenheimer	21	-			85	4.0	24	73	0.329	37	53	0.698	34	1.6		33			
Dick Miller	15	-			43	2.9	13	37	0.351	17	20	0.850	12	0.8		11			
Roger Melick	2	-			2	1.0	1	3	0.333	0	0	0.000	1	0.5		0			
Fred Arand	3	-			0	0.0	0	3	0.000	0	0	0.000	0	0.0		0			
Fred Lowe	3	-			0	0.0	0	0	0.000	0	0	0.000	0	0.0		1			
Total	21	-	-	-	1715	81.7	650	1631	0.399	415	624	0.665	991	47.2		409			
Opponents	21	-	-	-	1631	77.7	570	1536	0.371	491	705	0.696	965	46.0		381			

Legend
GP	Games played	GS	Games started	Avg	Average per game
FG	Field-goals made	FGA	Field-goal attempts	Off	Offensive rebounds
Def	Defensive rebounds	A	Assists	TO	Turnovers
Blk	Blocks	Stl	Steals	High	Team high
