= 1946–47 Ohio Bobcats men's basketball team =

American college basketball season

1946–47 Ohio Bobcats men's basketball
- Conference: Mid-American Conference
- Record: 13–10 (5–3 Mid-American)
- Head coach: Dutch Trautwein (9th season)
- Home arena: Men's Gymnasium

1946–47 Mid-American Conference men's basketball standings
	Conf.				Overall
Team	W		L	PCT	W		L	PCT
Butler	6	–	2	.750	16	–	7	.696
Cincinnati	6	–	2	.750	17	–	9	.654
Ohio	5	–	3	.625	13	–	10	.565
Western Reserve	2	–	6	.250	7	–	11	.389
Wayne	1	–	7	.125	3	–	15	.167

The 1946–47 Ohio Bobcats men's basketball team represented Ohio University in the college basketball season of 1946–47. The team was coached by Dutch Trautwein and played their home games at the Men's Gymnasium. They finished the season 11–8. This was Ohio's first year in the newly created Mid-American Conference. They finished third in the MAC with a conference record of 5–3.

== Schedule ==
Date time, TV	Rank^{#}	Opponent^{#}	Result	Record	Site (attendance) city, state
Regular Season
		Wayne State	W 66–29	1–0 (1–0)	
*		Marietta	W 105–25	2–0	
		Western Reserve	W 50–46	3–0 (2–0)	
*		at Dayton	W 64–29	4–0	
*		at Akron	L 54–69	4–1	
*		at Kentucky	L 36–46	4–2	
*		Xavier	W 47–30	5–2	
		at Wayne State	W 52–36	6–2 (3–0)	
*		at Charleston (WV)	W 57–46	7–2	
		at Cincinnati	L 36–41	7–3 (3–1)	
*		at Miami (OH)	L 45–52	7–4	
*		at Ohio Wesleyan	L 57–64	7–5	
*		Bowling Green	L 47–65	7–6	
		at Butler	L 70–80	7–7 (3–2)	
*		at Louisville	W 63–52	8–7	
		Cincinnati	W 67–65	8–8 (3–3)	
*		at Marietta	W 51–37	9–8	
*		Miami	L 47–60	9–9	
*		at Xavier	W 47–46	10–9	
*		Dayton	W 69–49	11–9	
*		Ohio Wesleyan	L 55–62	11–10	
		at Western Reserve	W 54–52	12–10 (4–3)	
		Butler	W 62–53	13–10 (5–3)	
*Non-conference game. ^{#}Rankings from AP Poll. (#) Tournament seedings in parentheses. All times are in Eastern Time.
