= 1948–49 Ohio Bobcats men's basketball team =

American college basketball season

1948–49 Ohio Bobcats men's basketball
- Conference: Mid-American Conference
- Record: 6–16 (2–8 Mid-American)
- Head coach: Dutch Trautwein (11th season)
- Home arena: Men's Gymnasium

1948–49 Mid-American Conference men's basketball standings
| | Conf. | | | | Overall |
| Team | W | | L | PCT | W | | L | PCT |
|---|---|---|---|---|---|---|---|---|
| Cincinnati | 9 | – | 1 | .900 | 23 | – | 5 | .821 |
| No. 18 Butler | 8 | – | 2 | .800 | 18 | – | 5 | .783 |
| Western Michigan | 4 | – | 6 | .400 | 12 | – | 10 | .545 |
| Western Reserve | 4 | – | 6 | .400 | 9 | – | 15 | .375 |
| Miami (Ohio) | 3 | – | 7 | .300 | 8 | – | 13 | .381 |
| Ohio | 2 | – | 8 | .200 | 6 | – | 16 | .273 |
Rankings from AP Poll

The 1948–49 Ohio Bobcats men's basketball team represented Ohio University in the college basketball season of 1948–49. The team was coached by Dutch Trautwein in his 11th and final season and played their home games at the Men's Gymnasium. They finished the season 6–16. They finished last (sixth) in the Mid-American Conference with a conference record of 2–8.

== Schedule ==
| Date time, TV | Rank^{#} | Opponent^{#} | Result | Record | Site (attendance) city, state |
Regular Season
| * | | Marietta | W 79–60 | 1–0 | |
| * | | at Charleston (WV) | W 60–46 | 2–0 | |
| * | | at Akron | L 56–59 | 2–1 | |
| * | | Mount Union | L 35–38 | 2–2 | |
| * | | at Morehead State | L 48–64 | 2–3 | |
| * | | at Muskingum | L 50–56 | 2–4 | |
| | | Western Reserve | W 77–48 | 3–4 (1–0) | |
| | | Butler | L 41–72 | 3–5 (1–1) | |
| | | at Butler | L 40–57 | 3–6 (1–2) | |
| | | Western Michigan | L 42–58 | 3–7 (1–3) | |
| | | at Cincinnati | L 47–78 | 3–8 (1–4) | |
| | | at Miami | L 46–53 | 3–9 (1–5) | |
| * | | Dayton | L 47–52 | 3–10 | |
| * | | at Ohio Wesleyan | L 47–52 | 3–11 | |
| * | | at Dayton | W 57–40 | 4–11 | |
| | | Miami | W 54–43 | 5–11 (2–5) | |
| * | | at Marietta | L 58–68 | 5–12 | |
| * | | Bowling Green | L 63–77 | 5–13 | |
| * | | Ohio Wesleyan | W 57–55 | 6–13 | |
| | | at Western Reserve | L 72–74 | 6–14 (2–6) | |
| | | Cincinnati | L 51–68 | 6–15 (2–7) | |
| | | at Western Michigan | L 56–69 | 6–16 (2–8) | |
*Non-conference game. ^{#}Rankings from AP Poll. (#) Tournament seedings in parentheses. All times are in Eastern Time.

== Statistics ==
=== Team statistics ===
Final 1948–49 statistics

| Record | Ohio | OPP |
|---|---|---|
| Scoring | 1193 | 1284 |
| Scoring Average | 54.23 | 58.36 |
| Field goals – Att | 467–1564 | 503–1540 |
| Free throws – Att | 259–432 | 278–468 |
| Rebounds | | |
| Assists | | |
| Turnovers | | |
| Steals | | |
| Blocked Shots | | |

=== Player statistics ===
| | | | Minutes | | Scoring | | Total FGs | | | Free-Throws | | | Rebounds | | | | | | |
| Player | GP | GS | Tot | Avg | Pts | Avg | FG | FGA | Pct | FT | FTA | Pct | Tot | Avg | A | PF | TO | Stl | Blk |
|---|---|---|---|---|---|---|---|---|---|---|---|---|---|---|---|---|---|---|---|
| _ Johnson | 22 | - | | | 242 | 11.0 | 91 | 277 | 0.329 | 60 | 81 | 0.741 | | | | 45 | | | |
| _ Kinsley | 22 | - | | | 222 | 10.1 | 87 | 289 | 0.301 | 48 | 79 | 0.608 | | | | 63 | | | |
| _ Dickey | 22 | - | | | 213 | 9.7 | 87 | 301 | 0.289 | 39 | 55 | 0.709 | | | | 67 | | | |
| _ McKown | 22 | - | | | 139 | 6.3 | 57 | 184 | 0.310 | 25 | 50 | 0.500 | | | | 27 | | | |
| _ Renner | 22 | - | | | 102 | 4.6 | 33 | 136 | 0.243 | 36 | 60 | 0.600 | | | | 36 | | | |
| _ Stefan | 20 | - | | | 90 | 4.5 | 37 | 95 | 0.389 | 16 | 27 | 0.593 | | | | 33 | | | |
| _ Gyurko | 16 | - | | | 39 | 2.4 | 15 | 57 | 0.263 | 9 | 19 | 0.474 | | | | 39 | | | |
| _ Pollock | 15 | - | | | 34 | 2.3 | 13 | 59 | 0.220 | 8 | 16 | 0.500 | | | | 26 | | | |
| G Williams | 15 | - | | | 34 | 2.3 | 12 | 48 | 0.250 | 10 | 17 | 0.588 | | | | 21 | | | |
| _ Ruoff | 7 | - | | | 23 | 3.3 | 11 | 36 | 0.306 | 1 | 4 | 0.250 | | | | 16 | | | |
| L Williams | 10 | - | | | 18 | 1.8 | 8 | 17 | 0.471 | 2 | 8 | 0.250 | | | | 7 | | | |
| _ Shreffler | 12 | - | | | 16 | 1.3 | 7 | 20 | 0.350 | 2 | 5 | 0.400 | | | | 10 | | | |
| _ Whyte | 10 | - | | | 9 | 0.9 | 4 | 32 | 0.125 | 1 | 7 | 0.143 | | | | 10 | | | |
| _ Luecke | 4 | - | | | 8 | 2.0 | 3 | 7 | 0.429 | 2 | 3 | 0.667 | | | | 2 | | | |
| Jack Schumacher | 5 | - | | | 4 | 0.8 | 2 | 6 | 0.333 | 0 | 1 | 0.000 | | | | 2 | | | |
| Total | 22 | - | - | - | 1193 | 54.2 | 467 | 1564 | 0.299 | 259 | 432 | 0.600 | 0 | 0.0 | | 404 | | | |
| Opponents | 22 | - | - | - | 1284 | 58.4 | 503 | 1540 | 0.327 | 278 | 468 | 0.594 | | 0.0 | | 364 | | | |

Legend
| GP | Games played | GS | Games started | Avg | Average per game |
| FG | Field-goals made | FGA | Field-goal attempts | Off | Offensive rebounds |
| Def | Defensive rebounds | A | Assists | TO | Turnovers |
| Blk | Blocks | Stl | Steals | High | Team high |
