= 1940–41 Cincinnati Bearcats men's basketball team =

American college basketball season

1940–41 Cincinnati Bearcats men's basketball
- Conference: Independent
- Record: 6–12
- Head coach: Clark Ballard (2nd season)
- Captain: Sid Friedman
- Home arena: Schmidlapp Gymnasium

The 1940–41 Cincinnati Bearcats men's basketball team represented the University of Cincinnati during the 1940–41 NCAA men's basketball season. The head coach was Clark Ballard, coaching his second season with the Bearcats. The team finished with an overall record of 6–12.

== Schedule ==
Date time, TV	Opponent	Result	Record	Site city, state
December 3	at Notre Dame	W 34–29	1–0	Schmidlapp Gymnasium; Cincinnati, OH
December 7	Georgetown (KY)	W 56–41	2–0	Schmidlapp Gymnasium; Cincinnati, OH
December 13	Hanover	W 48–25	3–0	Schmidlapp Gymnasium; Cincinnati, OH
December 18	Hanover	L 36–46	3–1	Schmidlapp Gymnasium; Cincinnati, OH
December 21	Wilmington	W 38–25	4–1	Schmidlapp Gymnasium; Cincinnati, OH
January 7	Akron	L 25–28	4–2	Schmidlapp Gymnasium; Cincinnati, OH
January 11	Marietta	W 36–34	5–2	Schmidlapp Gymnasium; Cincinnati, OH
January 14	at Toledo	L 38–56	5–3	The Field House; Toledo, OH
January 17	West Virginia	L 43–47	5–4	Schmidlapp Gymnasium; Cincinnati, OH
January 21	Ohio	W 51–42	6–4	Schmidlapp Gymnasium; Cincinnati, OH
January 25	at Dayton	L 29–43	6–5	Montgomery Fairgrounds Coliseum; Dayton, OH
January 29	at Wilmington	L 26–31	6–6	Wilmington, OH
February 1	at Hanover	L 41–42	6–7	Hanover, IN
February 4	at Ohio	L 42–57	6–8	Men's Gymnasium; Athens, OH
February 8	Miami (OH)	L 36–45	6–9	Schmidlapp Gymnasium; Cincinnati, OH
February 15	at West Virginia	L 36–55	6–10	WVU Field House; Morgantown, WV
February 19	Dayton	L 37–44	6–11	Schmidlapp Gymnasium; Cincinnati, OH
February 27	at Miami (OH)	L 35–41	6–12	Withrow Court; Oxford, OH
*Non-conference game. (#) Tournament seedings in parentheses.
