= 1938–39 Ohio Bobcats men's basketball team =

American college basketball season

1938–39 Ohio Bobcats men's basketball
- Conference: Buckeye Athletic Association
- Record: 12–8 (4–4 BAA)
- Head coach: Dutch Trautwein (1st season)
- Home arena: Men's Gymnasium

The 1938–39 Ohio Bobcats men's basketball team represented Ohio University. Dutch Trautwein was the head coach in his first year for Ohio. The Bobcats played their home games at the Men's Gymnasium. They finished the season 12–8 and 4–4 in the Buckeye Athletic Association. This was Ohio's last year in the BAA as it dissolved.

== Schedule ==
Date time, TV	Rank^{#}	Opponent^{#}	Result	Record	Site (attendance) city, state
Regular Season
*		Marietta	W 55–28	1–0	
*		at St. Joseph’s (PA)	W 58–44	2–0	
*		at Buffalo	W 58–38	2–1	
*		at Scranton	W 57–48	4–0	
*		at Western Reserve	L 54–59	4–1	
*		at George Washington	L 39–65	4–2	
		Ohio Wesleyan	W 57–38	5–2 (1–0)	
		at Dayton	W 44–23	6–2 (2–0)	
*		Xavier	L 30–41	6–3	
		Miami	W 44–28	7–3 (3–0)	
		at Miami	W 40–28	8–3 (4–0)	
*		at Marietta	W 66–44	9–3	
*		at Muskingum	W 47–37	10–3	
*		at Xavier	L 46–47	10–4	
		Marshall	L 42–47	10–5 (4–1)	
*		Bliss	W 62–34	11–5	
		at Ohio Wesleyan	L 23–36	11–6 (4–2)	
*		Toledo	W 77–45	12–6	
		Dayton	L 35–44	12–7 (4–3)	
		at Marshall	L 40–50	12–8 (4–4)	
*Non-conference game. ^{#}Rankings from AP Poll. (#) Tournament seedings in parentheses. All times are in Eastern Time.
