= Russ Finsterwald =

American football and basketball player and coach (1896–1962)

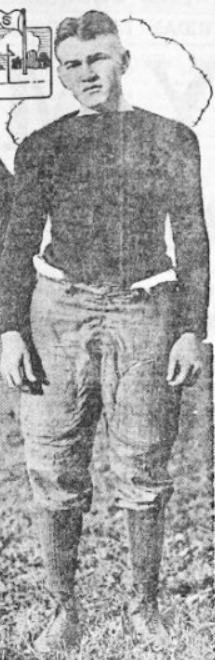

Profile
- Position: Wingback

Personal information
- Born: August 12, 1896; Athens, Ohio, U.S.
- Died: June 13, 1962 (aged 65); Athens, Ohio, U.S.
- Listed height: 5 ft 9 in (1.75 m)
- Listed weight: 165 lb (75 kg)

Career information
- High school: Athens (OH)
- College: Syracuse, Ohio

Career history
- Detroit Heralds (1920)
- Stats at Pro Football Reference

Russell Weihr Finsterwald (August 12, 1896 – June 13, 1962) was an American football and basketball player and coach. He played both sports at Syracuse University between 1916 and 1917 before serving in the U.S. Army during World War I. He played professional football for the 1920 Detroit Heralds during the first regular season of the National Football League (NFL), then known as the American Professional Football Association (APFA). He also served as the head coach of the Ohio University football and men's basketball teams in the early 1920s.

== Early life ==
Finsterwald was born in 1896 in Athens, Ohio.

== Athletic career ==
Finsterwald attended Syracuse University, where he received varsity letters in football, basketball and baseball. He played for the Syracuse Orange football team in 1916 and 1917. After the 1917 season, he served in the U.S. Army during World War I, attaining the rank of second lieutenant. After his discharge, he enrolled at Ohio University, where he played during the 1919 season as a member of the Ohio Bobcats football team.

In September 1920, the National Football League (called the American Professional Football Association during the 1920 and 1921 seasons) was founded at a meeting in the Hupmobile auto showroom of the owner of the Canton Bulldogs. In the inaugural season of the NFL, Finsterwald appeared in two games as a wingback for the 1920 Detroit Heralds.

== Coaching career ==
During the fall of 1920, Finsterwald returned to Ohio University as the coach of the school's football team. He coached the team from 1920 to 1922 and compiled a 13–10–1 record. Finsterwald also coached the Ohio Bobcats men's basketball team from 1920 to 1922, leading the team to a 34–6 record.

== Family and later life ==
Finsterwald died in 1962 in Athens, Ohio, at age 65. In 1965, he was posthumously inducted into the Ohio University Athletic Hall of Fame. His son, Dow Finsterwald, became a professional golfer, won the 1958 PGA Championship, and was inducted into Ohio University Athletic Hall of Fame four years after his father.

== Head coaching record ==
=== Football ===
Year	Team	Overall	Conference	Standing	Bowl/playoffs
Ohio Green and White (Ohio Athletic Conference) (1920–1922)
1920	Ohio	4–3	1–3	14th	
1921	Ohio	4–4–1	1–1	T–9th	
1922	Ohio	5–3	3–1	5th	
Ohio:		13–10–1	5–5		
Total:		13–10–1			

=== Basketball ===
Record table
Season	Team	Overall	Conference	Standing	Postseason
Ohio Green and White (Independent) (1920–1922)
1920–21	Ohio	14–3			
1921–22	Ohio	19–4			
Ohio:		33–7 (.825)			
Total:		33–7 (.825)			
