= 1939–40 Ohio Bobcats men's basketball team =

American college basketball season

1939–40 Ohio Bobcats men's basketball
- Conference: Independent
- Record: 19–6
- Head coach: Dutch Trautwein (2nd season)
- Home arena: Men's Gymnasium

The 1939–40 Ohio Bobcats men's basketball team represented Ohio University. Dutch Trautwein was the head coach for Ohio. The Bobcats played their home games at the Men's Gymnasium. They finished the season 19–6

== Schedule ==
Date time, TV	Rank^{#}	Opponent^{#}	Result	Record	Site (attendance) city, state
Regular Season
		Marietta	W 71–22	1–0	
		Western Michigan	W 60–40	2–0	
		Wabash	W 42–29	3–0	
		Xavier	W 48–37	4–0	
		Ohio Wesleyan	L 35–40	4–1	
		Western Reserve	W 50–33	5–1	
		Cincinnati	W 60–48	6–1	
		Muskingum	W 49–37	7–1	
		Miami	W 41–32	8–1	
		Dayton	W 62–44	9–1	
		at Buffalo	W 78–23	10–1	
		at Scranton	W 50–45	11–1	
		at Baltimore	W 67–44	12–1	
		at Villanova	L 44–49	12–2	
		at St. Joseph’s	W 59–39	13–2	
		at Dayton	W 42–34	14–2	
		at Toledo	L 50–63	14–3	
		at Western Michigan	L 42–43	14–4	
		at Marietta	W 52–28	15–4	
		at Miami	W 51–31	16–4	
		at Xavier	W 39–34	17–4	
		at Ohio Wesleyan	W 50–40	18–4	
		at Cincinnati	W 60–38	19–4	
		at Duquesne	L 40–52	19–5	
		at Washington & Jefferson	L 46–49	19–6	
*Non-conference game. ^{#}Rankings from AP Poll. (#) Tournament seedings in parentheses. All times are in Eastern Time.
