= 1950–51 Ohio Bobcats men's basketball team =

American college basketball season

1950–51 Ohio Bobcats men's basketball
- Record: 13–11 (4–4 )
- Head coach: Jim Snyder (2nd season)
- Home arena: Men's Gymnasium

1950–51 Mid-American Conference men's basketball standings
	Conf.				Overall
Team	W		L	PCT	W		L	PCT
No. 17 Cincinnati	7	–	1	.875	18	–	4	.818
Western Michigan	4	–	4	.500	13	–	9	.591
Ohio	4	–	4	.500	13	–	11	.542
Miami (Ohio)	4	–	4	.500	10	–	13	.435
Western Reserve	1	–	7	.125	3	–	7	.300
Rankings from AP Poll

The 1950–51 Ohio Bobcats men's basketball team represented Ohio University in the college basketball season of 1950–51. The team was coached by Jim Snyder in his 2nd season as Ohio's head coach. They played their home games at the Men's Gymnasium. They finished the season 13–11. They finished second in the Mid-American Conference with a conference record of 4–4.

== Schedule ==
Date time, TV	Rank^{#}	Opponent^{#}	Result	Record	Site (attendance) city, state
Regular Season
*		Marietta	W 57–45	1–0	
*		Kent State	W 61–46	2–0	
*		at Ohio Wesleyan	W 75–57	3–0	
*		at Akron	W 57–52	4–0	
*		at Youngstown State	L 64–78	4–1	
*		at Bowling Green	L 69–74	4–2	
*		at Kent State	W 53–48	5–2	
MAC regular season
		Western Reserve	W 72–60	6–2 (1–0)	
*		at Marshall	L 59–69	6–3	
		at Miami (OH)	L 44–52	6–4 (1–1)	
*		Dayton	L 66–75	6–5	
		Western Michigan	L 58–69	6–6 (1–2)	
*		at Muskingum	L 59–77	6–7	
*		Cedarville	W 77–60	7–7	
*		at Cedarville	W 72–63	8–7	
		at Western Reserve	W 93–77	9–7 (2–2)	
		Miami (OH)	W 56–50	10–7 (3–2)	
*		Marshall	W 71–63	11–7	
		at No. 15 Cincinnati	L 50–86	11–8 (3–3)	
*		Bowling Green	W 70–66	12–8	
		No. 18 Cincinnati	W 83–74	13–8 (4–3)	
		at Western Michigan	L 59–66	13–9 (4–4)	
*		at Marietta	L 55–72	13–10	
*		at Washington & Jefferson	L 69–92	13–11	
*Non-conference game. ^{#}Rankings from AP Poll. (#) Tournament seedings in parentheses. All times are in Eastern Time.

== Statistics ==
=== Player statistics ===
Final 1950–51 statistics

			Minutes		Scoring		Total FGs			Free-Throws			Rebounds						
Player	GP	GS	Tot	Avg	Pts	Avg	FG	FGA	Pct	FT	FTA	Pct	Tot	Avg	A	PF	TO	Stl	Blk
Glen Hursey	22	-			269	12.2	106	346	0.306	57	88	0.648	0	0.0		49			
Jack Betts	22	-			246	11.2	107	281	0.381	32	50	0.640	0	0.0		48			
Elwood Sparks	22	-			218	9.9	80	269	0.297	58	81	0.716	0	0.0		58			
Dave Leightenheimer	22	-			192	8.7	71	260	0.273	50	66	0.758	0	0.0		66			
Ralph Readout	22	-			144	6.5	58	171	0.339	28	48	0.583	0	0.0		53			
Vic Polosky	19	-			113	5.9	38	119	0.319	37	67	0.552	0	0.0		53			
Joe Benich	18	-			77	4.3	26	94	0.277	25	40	0.625	0	0.0		36			
Tom Haswell	13	-			36	2.8	13	63	0.206	10	15	0.667	0	0.0		15			
Dan Lechner	11	-			33	3.0	16	44	0.364	1	3	0.333	0	0.0		6			
Jack Schumacher	13	-			24	1.8	9	42	0.214	6	8	0.750	0	0.0		14			
Charles Renner	11	-			22	2.0	6	29	0.207	10	19	0.526	0	0.0		11			
Jack Williams	11	-			18	1.6	7	33	0.212	4	15	0.267	0	0.0		17			
Harold Daugherty	2	-			17	8.5	7	17	0.412	3	10	0.300	0	0.0		13			
Jerry Berry	7	-			16	2.3	6	18	0.333	4	7	0.571	0	0.0		5			
Lee Williams	2	-			0	0.0	0	0	0.000	0	0	0.000	0	0.0		1			
Total	24	-	-	-	0	0.0	0	0: 1. DIV/0!	0	0: 1. DIV/0!	0	0.0		0					
Opponents	24	-	-	-	1704	71.0	667	1868	0.357	370	623	0.594	1034	43.1	199	543			

Legend
GP	Games played	GS	Games started	Avg	Average per game
FG	Field-goals made	FGA	Field-goal attempts	Off	Offensive rebounds
Def	Defensive rebounds	A	Assists	TO	Turnovers
Blk	Blocks	Stl	Steals	High	Team high
