= 1940–41 Long Island Blackbirds men's basketball team =

American college basketball season

1940–41 Long Island Blackbirds men's basketball

National Invitation Tournament Champions
- Conference: Independent
- Record: 25–2
- Head coach: Clair Bee (10th season)

The 1940–41 Long Island Blackbirds men's basketball team represented Long Island University during the 1940–41 NCAA men's basketball season in the United States. The head coach was Clair Bee, coaching in his tenth season with the Blackbirds. The team finished the season with a 25–2 record and was retroactively listed as the top team of the season by the Premo-Porretta Power Poll. They won the 1941 National Invitation Tournament (NIT) as well—their second NIT championship in three seasons—going 3–0 in the tournament and defeating Ohio in the championship game.
