= 1947–48 Ohio Bobcats men's basketball team =

American college basketball season

1947–48 Ohio Bobcats men's basketball
- Record: 10–10 (4–4 )
- Head coach: Dutch Trautwein (10th season)
- Home arena: Men's Gymnasium

1947–48 Mid-American Conference men's basketball standings
	Conf.				Overall
Team	W		L	PCT	W		L	PCT
Cincinnati	7	–	2	.778	17	–	7	.708
Butler	4	–	2	.667	14	–	7	.667
Ohio	4	–	4	.500	10	–	10	.500
Miami (Ohio)	3	–	5	.375	13	–	15	.464
Western Reserve	2	–	6	.250	14	–	10	.583
Western Michigan	1	–	2	.333	12	–	10	.545

The 1947–48 Ohio Bobcats men's basketball team represented Ohio University in the college basketball season of 1947–48. The team was coached by Dutch Trautwein and played their home games at the Men's Gymnasium. They finished the season 10–10. They finished third in the Mid-American Conference with a conference record of 4–4.

== Schedule ==
Date time, TV	Rank^{#}	Opponent^{#}	Result	Record	Site (attendance) city, state
Regular Season
*		at Dayton	W 46–40	1–0	
*		Marietta	W 63–44	2–0	
*		Xavier	W 57–52	3–0	
*		at Bowling Green	L 49–67	3–1	
		at Miami	W 63–41	4–1 (1–0)	
*		Wayne State	W 55–39	5–1	
*		Kentucky	L 57–79	5–2	
		at Western Reserve	L 56–57	5–3 (1–1)	
*		Ohio Wesleyan	W 63–57	6–3	
*		Akron	L 62–63	6–4	
		at Butler	L 35–59	6–5 (1–2)	
*		at Xavier	L 37–56	6–6	
		Butler	L 42–47	6–7 (1–3)	
		Miami	W 56–37	7–7 (2–3)	
*		at Wayne State	L 47–55	7–8	
		Cincinnati	W 64–62	8–8 (3–3)	
*		at Marietta	L 53–68	8–9	
		Western Reserve	W 58–51	9–9 (4–3)	
*		at Ohio Wesleyan	W 62–54	10–9	
		at Cincinnati	L 46–90	10–10 (4–4)	
*Non-conference game. ^{#}Rankings from AP Poll. (#) Tournament seedings in parentheses. All times are in Eastern Time.

== Statistics ==
=== Team statistics ===
Final 1947–48 statistics

Record	Ohio	OPP
Scoring	1071	1118
Scoring Average	53.55	55.90
Field goals – Att	381–	420–
Free throws – Att	309–478	278–435
Rebounds		
Assists		
Turnovers		
Steals		
Blocked Shots		

=== Player statistics ===
			Minutes		Scoring		Total FGs			Free-Throws			Rebounds						
Player	GP	GS	Tot	Avg	Pts	Avg	FG	FGA	Pct	FT	FTA	Pct	Tot	Avg	A	PF	TO	Stl	Blk
_ Shrider	19	-			311	16.4	117			77	119	0.647				41			
_ Wylie	18	-			170	9.4	41			88	102	0.863				49			
_ Johnson	17	-			158	9.3	64			30	58	0.517				28			
_ Kinsley	20	-			102	5.1	36			30	49	0.612				47			
_ Gordon	20	-			95	4.8	27			41	56	0.732				79			
_ Dickey	15	-			67	4.5	30			7	17	0.412				37			
_ Williams	17	-			39	2.3	16			7	18	0.389				31			
_ Ruoff	14	-			31	2.2	13			5	7	0.714				21			
_ Whyte	6	-			24	4.0	9			6	12	0.500				12			
_ Gyurko	17	-			21	1.2	7			7	16	0.438				18			
_ Stefan	11	-			17	1.5	6			5	10	0.500				6			
_ McKown	8	-			15	1.9	6			3	7	0.429				2			
_ Shreffler	3	-			10	3.3	4			2	3	0.667				3			
_ Lamb	11	-			9	0.8	4			1	4	0.250				10			
_ Schott	3	-			2	0.7	1			0	0	0.000				0			
Total	20	-	-	-	1071	53.6	381	0: 1. DIV/0!	309	478	0.646	0	0.0		384				
Opponents	20	-	-	-	1118	55.9	420	1. DIV/0!	278	435	0.639		0.0		409				

Legend
GP	Games played	GS	Games started	Avg	Average per game
FG	Field-goals made	FGA	Field-goal attempts	Off	Offensive rebounds
Def	Defensive rebounds	A	Assists	TO	Turnovers
Blk	Blocks	Stl	Steals	High	Team high
