= 1949–50 Ohio Bobcats men's basketball team =

American college basketball season

1949–50 Ohio Bobcats men's basketball
- Record: 6–14 (3–7 )
- Head coach: Jim Snyder (1st season)
- Home arena: Men's Gymnasium

1949–50 Mid-American Conference men's basketball standings
	Conf.				Overall
Team	W		L	PCT	W		L	PCT
Cincinnati	10	–	0	1.000	20	–	6	.769
Western Michigan	6	–	4	.600	12	–	10	.545
Butler	6	–	4	.600	12	–	12	.500
Ohio	3	–	7	.300	6	–	14	.300
Miami (Ohio)	3	–	7	.300	5	–	15	.250
Western Reserve	2	–	6	.250	7	–	17	.292
Rankings from AP Poll

The 1949–50 Ohio Bobcats men's basketball team represented Ohio University in the college basketball season of 1949–50. The team was coached by Jim Snyder in his 1st of 26 seasons as Ohio's head coach. They played their home games at the Men's Gymnasium. They finished the season 6–14. They finished fourth in the Mid-American Conference with a conference record of 3–7.

== Schedule ==
Date time, TV	Rank^{#}	Opponent^{#}	Result	Record	Site (attendance) city, state
Regular Season
*		Marietta	L 40–54	0–1	
*		Ohio Wesleyan	W 74–56	1–1	
*		at Mount Union	L 39–53	1–2	
*		at Kent State	L 57–70	1–3	
		at Western Reserve	W 84–66	2–3 (1–0)	
*		Dayton	L 61–71	2–4	
		Western Michigan	L 56–81	2–5 (1–1)	
*		at Bowling Green	L 54–74	2–6	
		at No. 20 Cincinnati	L 38–57	2–7 (1–2)	
		Cincinnati	L 51–76	2–8 (1–3)	
		Miami	W 79–70	3–8 (2–3)	
		at Butler	L 49–70	3–9 (2–4)	
*		at Dayton	L 50–75	3–10	
		Western Reserve	W 62–49	4–10 (3–4)	
*		Muskingum	W 67–63	5–10	
		at Miami	L 45–54	5–11 (3–5)	
*		Akron	W 75–74	6–11	
		at Butler	L 56–67	6–12 (3–6)	
*		at Marietta	L 59–66	6–13	
		at Western Michigan	L 52–78	6–14 (3–7)	
*Non-conference game. ^{#}Rankings from AP Poll. (#) Tournament seedings in parentheses. All times are in Eastern Time.

== Statistics ==
=== Team statistics ===
Final 1949–50 statistics

Record	Ohio	OPP
Scoring	1148	1327
Scoring Average	57.40	66.35
Field goals – Att	432–1461	516–1586
Free throws – Att	284–459	295–470
Rebounds		
Assists		
Turnovers		
Steals		
Blocked Shots		

=== Player statistics ===
			Minutes		Scoring		Total FGs			Free-Throws			Rebounds						
Player	GP	GS	Tot	Avg	Pts	Avg	FG	FGA	Pct	FT	FTA	Pct	Tot	Avg	A	PF	TO	Stl	Blk
Elwood Sparks	20	-			237	11.9	89	284	0.313	59	85	0.694				60			
Glen Hursey	20	-			178	8.9	70	237	0.295	38	63	0.603				38			
Dave Leightenheimer	20	-			154	7.7	57	188	0.303	40	53	0.755				61			
_ Betts	19	-			136	7.2	59	165	0.358	18	28	0.643				42			
_ McKown	20	-			91	4.6	35	109	0.321	21	34	0.618				33			
Vic Polosky	19	-			91	4.8	29	106	0.274	33	64	0.516				48			
_ Lepp	20	-			77	3.9	27	114	0.237	23	40	0.575				31			
_ Benich	14	-			58	4.1	21	63	0.333	16	28	0.571				24			
_ Renner	17	-			53	3.1	18	69	0.261	17	34	0.500				21			
Jack Schumacher	11	-			31	2.8	11	51	0.216	9	12	0.750				8			
_ WIlliams	11	-			25	2.3	11	44	0.250	3	7	0.429				19			
_ Hupp	6	-			15	2.5	5	25	0.200	5	7	0.714				8			
_ Luecke	6	-			2	0.3	0	2	0.000	2	2	1.000				0			
_ Bingham	3	-			0	0.0	0	1	0.000	0	0	0.000				1			
_ Haswell	5	-			0	0.0	0	3	0.000	0	2	0.000				0			
Total	20	-	-	-	1148	57.4	432	1461	0.296	284	459	0.619	0	0.0		394			
Opponents	20	-	-	-	1327	66.4	516	1586	0.325	295	470	0.628		0.0		375			

Legend
GP	Games played	GS	Games started	Avg	Average per game
FG	Field-goals made	FGA	Field-goal attempts	Off	Offensive rebounds
Def	Defensive rebounds	A	Assists	TO	Turnovers
Blk	Blocks	Stl	Steals	High	Team high
