= Jim Snyder (coach) =

American basketball coach (1919–1994)

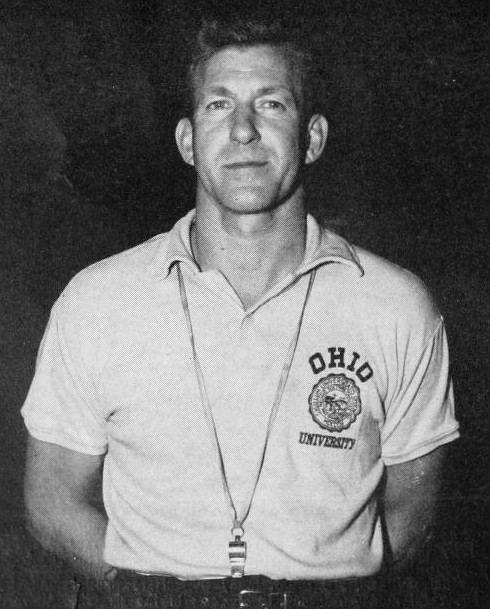
- Snyder in 1960

Biographical details
- Born: June 29, 1919; Canton, Ohio, U.S.
- Died: April 27, 1994 (aged 74); Palatine, Illinois, U.S.

Playing career
- 1938–1941: Ohio

Coaching career (HC unless noted)
- 1946–1949: Ohio (assistant)
- 1949–1974: Ohio

Head coaching record
- Overall: 354–245 (.591)
- Tournaments: 3–8 (NCAA); 1–1 (NIT)

Accomplishments and honors

Championships
- 7 MAC regular season (1960, 1961, 1964, 1965, 1970, 1972, 1974)

Awards
- 2× MAC Coach of the Year (1970, 1972)

James E. Snyder (June 29, 1919 – April 27, 1994) was a college basketball head coach and former player. He attended Ohio University where he played basketball under head coach Dutch Trautwein. He was an assistant coach under Trautwein for three seasons beginning in 1946. After Trautwein's retirement he became the head coach of the Ohio Bobcats men's basketball team where he remained for 26 years (1949–1974). He amassed 20 winning seasons and led his teams to 7 NCAA tournament appearances (1960, 1961, 1964, 1965, 1970, 1972, and 1974) and one National Invitation Tournament appearance (1969). Snyder's teams compiled a 355-255 record, good for a .581 winning percentage. He is the all time leader in coaching wins at Ohio. He was also an Ohio graduate (Class of 1941), and was a football and basketball star as an undergraduate in the late 1930s and early 1940s. He played for and was an assistant under Dutch Trautwein. He was inducted the Ohio Athletics Hall of Fame in 1967 and the Ohio Basketball Hall of Fame in 2007. One of his most memorable wins came against the University of Kentucky in the 1964 NCAA tournament, advancing the Ohio Bobcats to the Elite 8. One interesting aspect of this game was that Ohio had an integrated team while Kentucky had one of its last all white teams. Snyder was widely admired throughout the college basketball coaching fraternity as being a coach with great integrity and an engaging personality; he was often referred to as "Gentleman Jim." When he retired he was replaced by his long time assistant Dale Bandy.

== Head coaching record ==
Record table
Season	Team	Overall	Conference	Standing	Postseason
Ohio Bobcats (Mid–American Conference) (1949–1974)
1949–50	Ohio	6–14	3–7	T–4th	
1950–51	Ohio	13–11	4–4	T–2nd	
1951–52	Ohio	12–12	6–6	4th	
1952–53	Ohio	9–13	4–8	5th	
1953–54	Ohio	12–10	5–7	6th	
1954–55	Ohio	16–5	9–5	T–3rd	
1955–56	Ohio	13–11	5–7	T–5th	
1956–57	Ohio	15–8	7–5	T–3rd	
1957–58	Ohio	16–8	7–5	3rd	
1958–59	Ohio	14–10	6–6	T–3rd	
1959–60	Ohio	16–8	10–2	1st	NCAA University Division Regional Semifinals
1960–61	Ohio	17–7	10–2	1st	NCAA University Division First Round
1961–62	Ohio	13–10	9–4	2nd	
1962–63	Ohio	13–11	8–4	T–2nd	
1963–64	Ohio	21–6	10–2	1st	NCAA University Division Regional Finals
1964–65	Ohio	19–7	11–1	T–1st	NCAA University Division First Round
1965–66	Ohio	13–10	6–6	T–3rd	
1966–67	Ohio	8–15	4–8	T–5th	
1967–68	Ohio	7–16	3–9	T–6th	
1968–69	Ohio	17–9	9–3	2nd	NIT Quarterfinals
1969–70	Ohio	20–5	9–1	1st	NCAA University Division First Round
1970–71	Ohio	17–7	6–4	2nd	
1971–72	Ohio	15–11	7–3	T–1st	NCAA University Division First Round
1972–73	Ohio	16–10	6–5	4th	
1973–74	Ohio	16–11	9–3	1st	NCAA Division I First Round
Ohio:		354–245 (.591)	173–117 (.597)		
Total:		354–245 (.591)			
National champion Postseason invitational champion Conference regular season champion Conference regular season and conference tournament champion Division regular season champion Division regular season and conference tournament champion Conference tournament champion
