= Fenwick Club =

- Fenwick Club Annex
- U.S. National Register of Historic Places
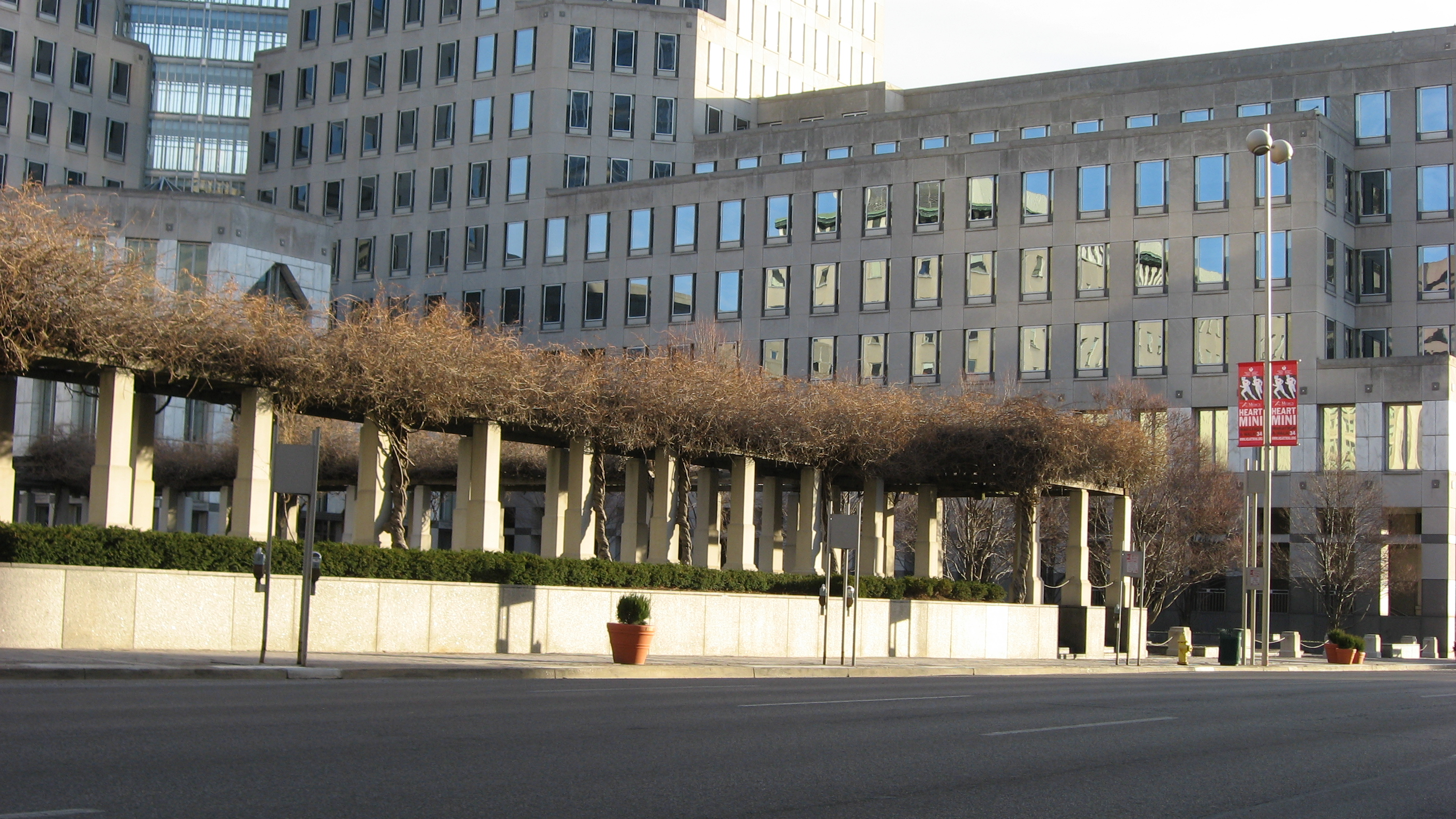
- Site of the Annex

- Location within Ohio Location within the United States
- Location: 426 E. 5th St., Cincinnati, Ohio
- Coordinates: 39°6′9″N 84°30′21″W
- Area: Less than 1 acre (0.40 ha)
- Built: 1921
- Architectural style: Late Victorian
- NRHP reference No.: 73001458
- Added to NRHP: March 7, 1973

The Fenwick Club was a historic building in downtown Cincinnati, Ohio, United States, which was constructed to serve a Catholic social organization for unmarried men. Although named a historic site in the 1970s because of its architecture, it is no longer standing.

Founded in 1915, the Fenwick Club was organized to serve unmarried Catholic men under the age of 40 by providing them with space for cultural and social activities, as well as lodging space. It was named for Edward Fenwick, the first Bishop of Cincinnati and the founder of the Dominicans in the United States. The institution was meant to provide a Catholic alternative to YMCA, due to heavy Protestant influence in YMCA, so it included components similar to a YMCA, including a library, sports facilities, and living space, and it sponsored social events for the residents. The club initially used space at 319 Broadway, and although it soon completed a building on Commercial Square, rapid growth forced the leaders to buy an adjacent lot in order to construct an annex building in 1921, just four years after their first building was constructed. After the building was constructed, a Catholic chapel was built next door: this building, the Chapel of the Holy Spirit, was constructed in 1927.

The institution's primary building was nine stories tall, built of brick with details of stone and terracotta, while the annex was just three stories tall. The structure was also built of brick, resting on a stone foundation and detailed with elements of limestone and iron. The facade included two dormer windows in its steeply pitched front roof. The facade was divided into five bays, topped with miniature gables on the end and middle bays and a dormer in the other two; windows filled all bays except for the central, which included a columned main entrance on the first floor and a small balcony on the second.

In 1973, the Fenwick Club's annex building was listed on the National Register of Historic Places, becoming the seventh downtown building with this distinction; it qualified both because of its historically significant architecture and because of its place in local history. Despite its status as a historic site, the building was destroyed in 1979: it sat near Procter & Gamble headquarters, and as the company was looking to expand its office complex, several neighboring buildings were removed. Besides the Fenwick Club, the project resulted in the destruction of Wesley Chapel, Allen Temple AME Church, and the adjacent Catholic chapel. Although destroyed more than thirty years ago, the annex building officially remains on the National Register.
