= 1941 National Invitation Tournament =

Annual NCAA basketball competition

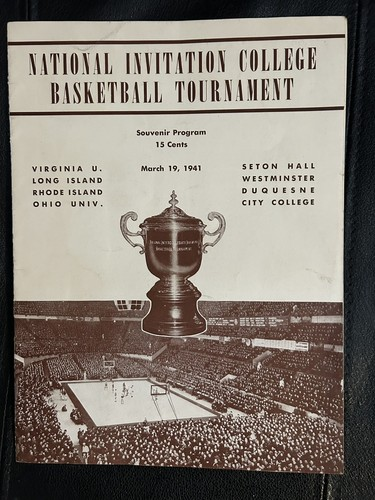

Tournament details
- City: New York City
- Venue: Madison Square Garden
- Teams: 8

Final positions
- Champions: Long Island Blackbirds (2nd title)
- Runners-up: Ohio Bobcats
- Semifinalists: CCNY Beavers; Seton Hall Pirates

Awards
- MVP: Frankie Baumholtz (Ohio)

The 1941 National Invitation Tournament was the 1941 edition of the annual NCAA college basketball competition.

== Selected teams ==
Below is a list of the eight teams selected for the tournament.

- CCNY
- Duquesne
- Long Island
- Ohio
- Rhode Island
- Seton Hall
- Virginia
- Westminster

== Bracket ==
Below is the tournament bracket.

Quarterfinals
CCNY	64
Virginia	35
Ohio	55
Duquesne	40
Seton Hall	70
Rhode Island	54
Long Island	48
Westminster	36

Semifinals
CCNY	43
Ohio	45
Seton Hall	26
Long Island	49

Finals
Ohio	42
Long Island	56

Third place game
CCNY	42
Seton Hall	27

== See also ==
- 1941 NCAA basketball tournament
- 1941 NAIA Basketball Tournament
