= Grover Center =

Sports venue in Athens, Ohio

- Interactive map of Grover Center
- Location: West Green, Ohio University; Athens, Ohio 45701
- Coordinates: 39°19′25″N 82°06′11″W
- Owner: Ohio University
- Operator: Ohio University
- Capacity: 6,800

Construction
- Built: 1960
- Opened: December 1, 1960
- Cost: $1.8 million ($89.2 million in 2025 dollars)

Tenant
- Ohio Bobcats (NCAA) (1960–1968)

Grover Center was originally built to be the home for the Ohio Bobcats men's basketball team. It replaced the Men's Gymnasium (now known as Bentley Hall), the team's home since 1924. The first men's basketball game in the arena featured the Ohio Bobcats hosting the previous years national champion Ohio State Buckeyes on December 1, 1960 to a sold out crowd. The Ohio Bobcats basketball team only called the Grover Center home from 1960–68 after the much larger Convocation Center opened up December 3, 1968. It is named after former Bobcat coach Butch Grover.

== Renovations ==
From 1996 to 2001 renovations began to convert the building to more than 50 classrooms and labs and expanding to nearly 200,000 square feet (19,000 m^{2}) in size. The total cost of the 5 year renovation was $24.5 million.
