= Ohio Bobcats men's basketball =

Basketball team of Ohio University

2026–27 Ohio Bobcats men's basketball team
- University: Ohio University
- First season: 1907; 119 years ago
- Athletic director: Slade Larscheid
- Head coach: Jeff Boals (8th season)
- Location: Athens, Ohio
- Arena: Convocation Center (capacity: 13,080)
- Conference: Mid-American
- Nickname: Bobcats
- Colors: Hunter green and white
- Student section: O-Zone
- All-time record: 1,646–1229(.573)

NCAA Division I tournament Elite Eight
- 1964
Other NCAA Division I tournament results
Sweet Sixteen	1960, 1964, 2012
Appearances	1960, 1961, 1964, 1965, 1970, 1972, 1974, 1983, 1985, 1994, 2005, 2010, 2012, 2021

Conference tournament champions
- 1983, 1985, 1994, 2005, 2010, 2012, 2021

Conference regular-season champions
- 1921, 1931, 1933, 1937, 1960, 1961, 1964, 1965, 1970, 1972, 1974, 1985, 1994, 2013

Uniforms
Home	Away	Alternate

The Ohio Bobcats men's basketball team is an intercollegiate varsity sports program of Ohio University. The team is a member of the Mid-American Conference competing in Division I of the National Collegiate Athletic Association (NCAA). The Bobcats have played their home games in the Convocation Center since 1968.

The first Ohio basketball game occurred in 1907 when the Bobcats defeated the Parkersburg YMCA 46–9. Through the 2022–23 season, Ohio has posted a .574 winning percentage over its 117-year history and a .561 winning percentage in its 78 years in the Mid-American Conference. The Bobcats have won seven Mid-American Conference tournament titles (1983, 1985, 1994, 2005, 2010, 2012, and 2021), as well as 10 MAC regular-season titles (1960, 1961, 1964, 1965, 1970, 1972, 1974, 1985, 1994 and 2013). Prior to joining the MAC, the Bobcats won an Ohio Athletic Conference title in 1921 and three Buckeye Athletic Association championships (1931, 1933, and 1937). In addition, Ohio has played in the NCAA tournament 14 times (second most in the MAC), appearing in 1960, 1961, 1964, 1965, 1970, 1972, 1974, 1983, 1985, 1994, 2005, 2010, 2012, and 2021. The Bobcats have been selected for the National Invitation Tournament five times: in 1941 (runner-up), 1969, 1986, 1995, and 2013. Ohio also appeared in the College Basketball Invitational in 2008, 2016, and 2022 and the CollegeInsider.com Tournament in 2011 and 2014. The program was ranked 86th in Street & Smith's 100 Greatest Basketball Programs of All Time, published in 2005.

== History ==
The first intercollegiate men's basketball game involving an Ohio University team was played in Athens in 1907 against the Parkersburg YMCA. Under the direction of coach James Jones, the Bobcats won the game by a score of 46–9 and continued their victories with a 5-game winning streak to start the season. The 'Cats would go on to lose 4 games that season and earn a 7–4 record.

Coach Jones would only be at Ohio for two more seasons, leading the team to records of 1–1 in the 1908–09 campaign and 2–5 during the 1909–10 season. Over the next three seasons, the basketball program was in a state of flux, with a new coach taking over the reins every year. Ohio joined the Ohio Athletic Conference in 1911, and started out poorly under coach Arthur Hinaman with a 2–9 record.

A bit of stability arrived to Athens with the hiring of coach Mark Banks in 1913. Banks would lead the program to a 3–10 season in his first year, but the 'Cats surged to 11–4 in Bank's second year at the helm. That 1914–1915 squad beat the Cincinnati Bearcats and the Miami Redskins twice, while also impressively defeating Wooster by a score of 51–20. Banks teams would fall off over the next several seasons, with the low point being a 2–14 mark in the 1916–1917 campaign. Banks would coach only one more year, with the Bobcats posting a 4–8 record in the 1918–1919 season.

Bank's successor was Frank Gullum, who in his two years at the helm was 5–4 and 5–6, respectively. Gullum was succeeded by Russell Finsterwald, who led the team to an outstanding 15–2 season in his first year at the helm. That 1920–1921 team defeated the Miami Redskins and Cincinnati Bearcats each twice, and also earned Ohio's first Ohio Athletic Association title. Finsterwald's 1921–1922 squad was equally impressive, posting a 19–4 mark with two wins against the Bowling Green Falcons. Though Finsterwald would only last these two seasons, his work cannot be underestimated in steering the 'Cats towards a legacy of success.

=== 1922–1949: The Grover-Trautwein era ===
Butch Grover took the reins of the Ohio program in 1922, and led the team to a newfound level of success. His inaugural 1922–1923 season was marked by an 11–8 record, and wins over teams such as the Cincinnati Bearcats and the Marietta Pioneers. In 1923-24, the Bobcats marked their move into the brand new Men's Gymnasium with a 16–5 record and a near miss of an Ohio Athletic Conference title. Several winning seasons later, the Bobcats moved into the Buckeye Athletic Association in 1926 and started off with an 8–13 mark in the 1926–1927 season. Ohio won its first Buckeye Athletic Association title during the 1930–31 season with a 12–4 mark. Just two seasons later in 1933–1934, the Bobcats won another Buckeye Athletic Association championship with a 16–4 record and two wins over the archrival Miami Redskins. The 1936–1937 season marked Grover's third and final Buckeye Athletic Association championship. The Bobcats were 18–3 that year, and earned wins over programs such as Xavier and Dayton. William J. "Dutch" Trautwein took over the Bobcat basketball program in 1938. He led the team to 12–8 and 19–6 records in his first and second seasons. In the 1940–41 season, the team earned a record of 18–4, and was selected for the National Invitation Tournament after a season which included wins over Xavier, Akron, Toledo, Cincinnati, and archrival Miami. With the play of Frank Baumholtz, the Bobcats finished as runners-up in the tournament to perennial power Long Island University. Baumholtz, known as the "Midvale Marvel", earned tournament MVP honors and All-American status for his NIT performance. Following his Ohio career, he became one of a few to play two professional sports – basketball with the Cleveland Rebels in 1946–47 and baseball with the Chicago Cubs, Cincinnati Reds, and Philadelphia Phillies over a 10-year career.

After several more winning seasons under Trautwein, the Bobcats undertook a new challenge in 1946 when they joined the new Mid-American Conference. The 'Cats were 13–10 in their first year in the MAC, and followed that up with a 10–10 mark in the 1947–1948 season. The 1948–1949 season was Trautwein's last, with the team compiling a 6–16 record.

=== 1949–1974: Jim Snyder ===
Ohio alumnus Jim Snyder took over for Trautwein in 1949. Ohio's winningest coach, dubbed "Gentleman Jim", guided the Bobcats for a quarter century. With star players like Jim Betts, Bunk Adams, Jerry Jackson, Don Hilt, Gerald McKee and Sports Illustrated cover boy Walter Luckett, Snyder won a total of seven MAC titles. His teams made seven NCAA appearances and finished with a winning record 21 times in 25 years.

Snyder's first season was rather lackluster, with the 'Cats posting a 6–14 record. He followed that up with a slight improvement in the 1950–1951 season and a 13–11 mark. The 1954–1955 season was a breakout year for Ohio, and the team earned a 16–5 record and key wins over Morehead State and Miami University. In 1960, Ohio won its first championship under Snyder, with the team taking the MAC by way of a 10–2 league record (17–8 overall). That squad defeated the likes of the Toledo Rockets, Bowling Green Falcons, and Miami Redskins en route to a 74–66 win over Notre Dame in the first round of the NCAA tournament.

The 1959–1960 championship team was quickly followed up by another title in the very next year. The 1960–1961 team celebrated its move into the brand new Grover Center with a stunning 10–2 league record (17–7 overall), including a first-place finish at the Canton Intercollegiate Tournament. A few years later, the 1963–1964 team made its mark as perhaps the best in Ohio history. That team won the MAC title with a 10–2 league mark, and followed it up with NCAA tournament wins over the Louisville Cardinals and the No. 4 Kentucky Wildcats. Snyder's 'Cats ultimately lost to the No. 2 Michigan Wolverines in the "Elite Eight".

Though the 1963–1964 team produced a record that was hard to top, the 1964–1965 edition did its best to compete with the previous year's squad. They posted an 11–1 MAC record and a 19–7 overall mark, though fell to Dayton in the first round of the NCAA tournament. Snyder's teams would go through a slight drought until the 1968–1969 season, when they open up the Convocation Center with a win over the Indiana Hoosiers and subsequent postseason NIT appearance and a 17–9 record. The very next season, Ohio scored wins over No. 16 Ohio State and No. 13 Purdue and achieved a midseason #5 national ranking while marching their way to another MAC championship before losing in the NCAA tournament to Notre Dame.

The Bobcats won another MAC title under Snyder in the 1971–1972 season. Though the 'Cats were just 15–11 that year, they were 7–3 in the MAC with wins over the No. 12 Indiana Hoosiers and the No. 4 Ohio State Buckeyes. Snyder's Bobcats won a final MAC title in the 1973–1974 season, with a 16–11 record and wins over the Penn State Nittany Lions and the Ohio State Buckeyes.

=== 1974–1989 ===
Jim Snyder was immediately succeeded by his assistant Dale Bandy, who struggled to a 69–89 record over his six-year tenure at Ohio. Bandy was replaced by Danny Nee in 1980, with the Bobcats beginning a road back to prominence. His teams – led by the likes of John Devereaux, Robert Tatum, Paul Baron, John Rhodes, Eddie Hicks and Vic Alexander –tallied four consecutive 20-win seasons from 1983 to 1986. The 1982-83 team won the MAC Tournament title with a subsequent win in the NCAA tournament. In 1985 the Bobcats won both the MAC regular season and tournament but lost to Kansas in the NCAA tournament. The 1986 team finished with an NIT matchup in the Convo versus the Ohio State Buckeyes.

Nee left in 1986 to coach the Nebraska Cornhuskers, with Billy Hahn taking over the reins. His teams were led by future NBA players Paul "Snoopy" Graham and Dave Jamerson, two of Ohio's three 2,000-point scorers. Jamerson's 31.2 points per-game average in 1989–90 included a Convo-record 60-point win over the University of Charleston.

=== 1989–2001: Larry Hunter ===
Despite offensive stars, Hahn's teams struggled on the court. Hahn was replaced in 1989 by Larry Hunter, an Ohio alum who would lead the Bobcats throughout the 1990s. Forward Gary Trent joined Graham and Jamerson atop the 2,000-point plateau, and was the MAC's only three-time Player of the Year. Trent teamed with three-point marksman Geno Ford to guide Larry Hunter's Bobcats to a MAC Championship in the 1993–1994 season. Ohio captured the conference tournament that season with an 89–66 victory over archrival Miami in the finals on ESPN.

Hunter, who played for Snyder, saw Ohio defeat Ohio State in the Preseason NIT to open the following season. Wins over 14th-ranked Virginia, George Washington and New Mexico State earned the Bobcats a Preseason NIT title and an accompanying national ranking. That team would go on to post a 24–10 (13–5 MAC) record, en route to an appearance in the post-season NIT and a win over George Washington University in the first round.

The Bobcats would struggle in the next few years under Hunter, with the low point being a 5–21 season in the 1997–1998 campaign. Though Hunter's teams would rebound to post 18, 20, and 19 wins over the next three seasons, he was relieved of his duties in 2001 due to a lack of success in the postseason. His successor would be Tim O'Shea.

=== 2001–2008: Tim O'Shea ===
A new era in Ohio basketball began in 2001 when Boston College assistant Tim O'Shea became the Bobcats' 15th head coach. His teams featured Patrick Flomo, Brandon Hunter and Steve Esterkamp and saw the creation The Convo's new student section, the O Zone. Hunter was drafted by the Boston Celtics in the second round of the 2003 draft. Esterkamp continues to play professionally overseas as well.

In the 2004–2005 season Ohio went 13–1 in The Convo and won 13 of their final 17 games. The team defeated Marshall, Kent State, and Miami in the preliminary rounds of the MAC tournament before scoring an 80–79 overtime victory over Buffalo in the championship to earn an NCAA tournament berth. Despite a second-half comeback against the Southeastern Conference champion Florida, the Bobcats' season ended in the first round.

The 2005–2006 'Cats proved successful as well, posting a 19–11 record with wins over teams such as Rhode Island and Samford, and a close loss to Kentucky. The 2006–2007 team also posted 19 wins, with a final record of 19–13. A 20 win campaign happened in the 2007–2008 season, including notable non-conference wins over Maryland, St. John's, George Mason, and Bucknell. The team was extended an invite to the College Basketball Invitational, where the Bobcats advanced to the second round.

On June 23, 2008, O'Shea announced he was leaving the Bobcats team to become head coach at Bryant University.

=== 2008–2012: John Groce ===
On June 27, 2008, former Ohio State associate head coach John Groce was named the 16th head coach in Bobcats history. Groce brought 14 years of assistant coaching experience to Athens, along with a pair of outright Big Ten Conference regular-season titles, two NCAA tournament appearances, a berth in the 2007 NCAA National Championship game and the 2008 NIT title.

The Bobcats finished the 2009–2010 regular season with a 17–14 overall record and a 7–9 record in MAC play, earning them the ninth seed in their conference tournament. They won four straight games in the conference tournament to claim the MAC's automatic bid to the NCAA tournament. Placed into the Midwest region as a 14 seed, Ohio upset 3rd-seeded and 12th ranked Georgetown 97–83. The Bobcats took a 12-point lead into halftime and the Hoyas never got closer than a 7-point deficit the rest of the way.

After a mildly disappointing 2010–11 season, resulting in a 19–16 record and a 2011 CIT Quarterfinal berth, the Bobcats came back in 2011–12, with a 2012 MAC tournament championship. The Bobcats received a No. 13 seed in the Midwest Region of the 2012 NCAA tournament. Like 2010, Ohio pulled off a first round upset, defeating 4th seeded and 13th ranked Michigan 65–60, and followed by a 62–56 victory over 12th seeded South Florida to advance to their first Sweet Sixteen since 1964. The Bobcats run ended in the Sweet Sixteen, as they fell in overtime to fourth ranked and top seeded North Carolina by a score of 73–65.

As a result of the teams' success, John Groce was offered and accepted the head coaching position at the University of Illinois on March 28, 2012.

=== 2012–2014: Jim Christian ===
On April 3, 2012, Ohio hired former TCU and Kent State coach Jim Christian to replace John Groce. Christian had considerable success in the MAC at the helm of Kent State, eclipsing the 20 win plateau in each of his six seasons.

In Christian's first season with the Bobcats, they finished with a 24–10 overall record and 14–2 in the MAC. Tied for first in the MAC East, the Bobcats were the 2nd seed in the MAC tournament falling to Akron in the championship 65–46. Akron was the only MAC opponent the Bobcats had failed to defeat all season. The Bobcats earned a spot in the 2013 National Invitation Tournament but came up short with a 61–57 loss to Denver in the first round.

During the 2013–14 season, Christian led the Bobcats to a 25–12 record making the senior class the winningest class in school history with 97 total wins. Ohio failed to reach the NCAA Tournament, losing to Akron once again in the MAC Tournament. The team received an invitation to participate in the 2014 CIT and reached the quarterfinals losing to VMI 90–92.

On April 3, 2014, Christian left Ohio and accepted an offer to become the head coach for the Boston College Eagles.

=== 2014–2019: Saul Phillips ===
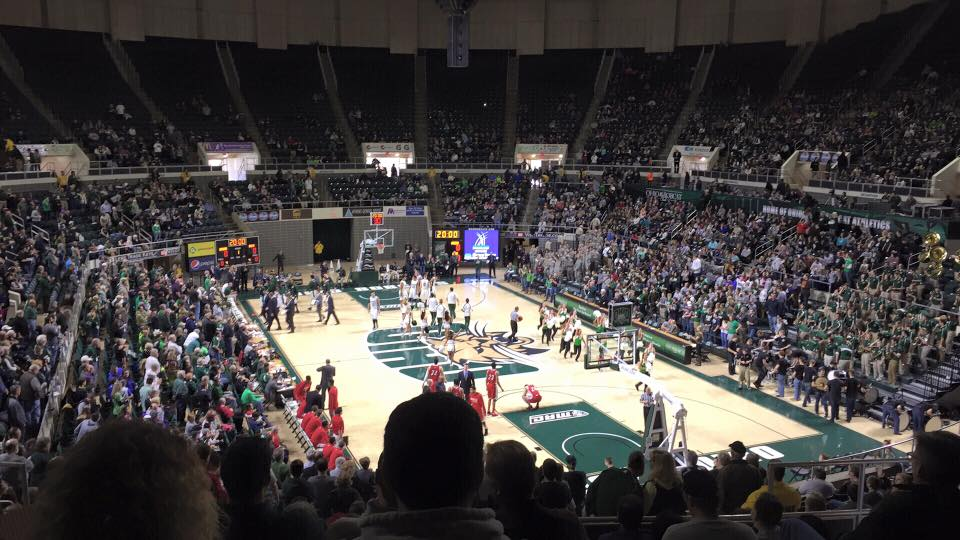
Ohio vs NIU, February 6, 2016

Ohio hired Saul Phillips to replace Christian as the head coach for the Bobcats on April 6, 2014. Phillips had tremendous success coaching for NDSU the previous 7 years, including a second round NCAA tournament win in 2014 and two Summit League championships in 2009 and 2014. His first season at Ohio was a disappointment as the 2014–15 Bobcats finished with a 10–20 overall record and only 5 wins in the MAC to put them last place in their division.

The 2015–16 Bobcats improved to a 23–12 overall record and 11–7 MAC Conference record giving them the #2 seed in the 2016 MAC tournament. Junior Antonio Campbell was named the 2016 MAC Player of the Year after averaging a double-double throughout the 2015–16 season, making him the ninth Ohio Bobcat to receive the award. The Bobcats lost to Buffalo in the semifinal game of the MAC Tournament 74–88. The 2015–16 team received and accepted an invitation to the 2016 College Basketball Invitational and reached the semifinals but lost to Morehead State.

Phillips was told he would not return next season on March 13, 2019.

=== 2019–present: Jeff Boals ===
Ohio hired alumnus Jeff Boals to replace Phillips as the head coach for the Bobcats on March 17, 2019. Boals (pronounced BOWLS) spent the prior three seasons as the head coach at Stony Brook going 55–41 overall and 31–17 in America East play. The Bobcats went 17-15 in Boals first season with Ohio. Following the 2019-2020 season, the MAC tournament was cancelled due to the start of the coronavirus pandemic. The next season Boals lead his 2020-21 team to a 17-8 record including 3 wins in the MAC tournament. They received the conference's automatic bid to the NCAA tournament as the No. 13 seed in the West region. There they upset No. 4-seeded Virginia in the First Round before falling to No. 5-seeded Creighton in the Second Round. The 2021-22 team opened the season 22–4 but struggled down the stretch to finish 25–10 His 2022-23 team had a lot of roster turnover and slipped to 19–14. His 2023-24 team finished 20–13. Entering the 2024-25 season, the Bobcats received 11 of the 12 first place votes to win the MAC but could only post a 16–16 record. They failed to do better in the 2025–26 season with the first losing record under Boals at 15–17. They lost in the quarterfinals of the MAC tournament for the second straight year.

== Seasonal Results ==
As of 11/18/2026

Ohio Athletic Association (1907–1926)
Year	Overall Rec.	Conference Rec.
1907–08	7–4	N/A
1908–09	1–1	N/A
1909–10	2–5	N/A
1910–11	3–4	N/A
1911–12	2–9	N/A
1912–13	5–8	N/A
1913–14	3–10	N/A
1914–15	11–4	N/A
1915–16	8–7	N/A
1916–17	2–14	N/A
1917–18	4–8	N/A
1918–19	5–4	N/A
1919–20	5–6	N/A
1920–21	15–2	N/A
1921–22	19–4	N/A
1922–23	11–8	N/A
1923–24	16–5	N/A
1924–25	12–6	N/A
1925–26	15–9	N/A
Buckeye Athletic Association (1926–1939)
1926–27	8–13	3–7
1927–28	10–10	4–6
1928–29	10–10	3–7
1929–30	12–9	4–4
1930–31	12–4	7–1
1931–32	11–10	5–5
1932–33	16–4	7–3
1933–34	5–14	2–6
1934–35	11–9	5–5
1935–36	13–7	7–3
1936–37	18–3	10–1
1937–38	12–8	4–6
1938–39	12–8	4–4
Independent (1939–1946)
1939–40	19–6	N/A
1940–41	18–4	N/A
1941–42	12–9	N/A
1942–43	11–7	N/A
1943–44	9–7	N/A
1944–45	11–8	N/A
1945–46	15–5	N/A

Mid-American Conference (1946–present)
Year	Overall Rec.	Conference Rec.
1946–47	13–10	5–3
1947–48	10–10	4–4
1948–49	6–16	2–8
1949–50	6–14	3–7
1950–51	13–11	4–4
1951–52	12–12	6–6
1952–53	9–13	4–8
1953–54	12–10	5–7
1954–55	16–5	9–5
1955–56	13–11	5–7
1956–57	15–8	7–5
1957–58	16–8	7–5
1958–59	14–10	10–2
1959–60	17–8	10–2
1960–61	17–7	10–2
1961–62	13–10	8–4
1962–63	13–11	8–4
1963–64	21–6	10–2
1964–65	19–7	11–1
1965–66	13–10	6–6
1966–67	8–15	4–8
1967–68	7–16	3–9
1968–69	17–9	9–3
1969–70	20–5	9–1
1970–71	17–7	6–4
1971–72	15–11	7–3
1972–73	16–10	6–5
1973–74	16–11	9–3
1974–75	12–14	4–10
1975–76	11–15	7–9
1976–77	9–17	4–12
1977–78	13–14	6–10
1978–79	16–11	10–6
1979–80	8–18	5–11
1980–81	7–20	6–10
1981–82	13–14	12–6
1982–83	23–9	12–6
1983–84	20–8	14–4
1984–85	22–8	14–4
1985–86	22–8	14–4
1986–87	14–14	7–9

Mid-American Conference (cont.)
Year	Overall Rec.	Conference Rec.
1987–88	16–14	9–7
1988–89	12–17	6–10
1989–90	12–16	5–11
1990–91	16–12	9–7
1991–92	18–10	10–6
1992–93	14–13	11–7
1993–94	25–8	14–4
1994–95	24–10	13–5
1995–96	16–14	11–7
1996–97	17–10	12–6
1997–98	5–21	3–15
1998–99	18–10	12–6
1999–00	20–13	11–7
2000–01	19–11	12–6
2001–02	17–11	11–7
2002–03	14–16	8–10
2003–04	10–20	7–11
2004–05	21–11	11–7
2005–06	19–11	10–8
2006–07	19–13	9–7
2007–08	20–13	9–7
2008–09	15–17	7–9
2009–10	22–15	7–9
2010–11	19–16	9–7
2011–12	29–8	11–5
2012–13	24–10	14–2
2013–14	25–12	11–7
2014–15	10–20	5–13
2015–16	23–12	11–7
2016–17	20–11	11–7
2017–18	14–17	7–11
2018–19	14–17	6–12
2019–20	17–15	8–10
2020–21	17–7	9–5
2021–22	25–10	14–6
2022–23	19–14	10–8
2023–24	20–13	13–5
2024–25	16–16	10–8
2025–26	15–17	9–9
2026–27	3–1	0–0

== Postseason results ==
=== NCAA tournament results ===
The Bobcats have appeared in 14 NCAA Tournaments. Their combined record is 8–15.

Year	Seed	Round	Opponent	Result
1960	n/a	First Round	Notre Dame	W 77–66
1960	n/a	Sweet Sixteen	Georgia Tech	L 57–54
1960	n/a	Regional Third Place Game	Western Kentucky	L 97–87
1961	n/a	First Round	Louisville	L 76–70
1964	n/a	First Round	Louisville	W 71–69 OT
1964	n/a	Sweet Sixteen	Kentucky	W 85–69
1964	n/a	Elite Eight	Michigan	L 69–57
1965	n/a	First Round	Dayton	L 66–65
1970	n/a	First Round	Notre Dame	L 112–82
1972	n/a	First Round	Marquette	L 73–49
1974	n/a	First Round	Marquette	L 85–59
1983	#11	First Round	Illinois State	W 51–49
1983	#11	Second Round	Kentucky	L 57–40
1985	#14	First Round	Kansas	L 49–38
1994	#12	First Round	Indiana	L 84–72
2005	#13	First Round	Florida	L 67–62
2010	#14	First Round	Georgetown	W 97–83
2010	#14	Second Round	Tennessee	L 83–68
2012	#13	First Round	Michigan	W 65–60
2012	#13	Second Round	South Florida	W 62–56
2012	#13	Sweet Sixteen	North Carolina	L 73–65 ^{OT}
2021	#13	First Round	Virginia	W 62–58
2021	#13	Second Round	Creighton	L 58–72

=== National Invitation Tournament results ===
Ohio has been selected to participate in five National Invitation Tournaments. Their combined record is 4–5.

Year	Round	Opponent	Result
1941	First Round	Duquesne	W 55–40
1941	Semifinals	CCNY	W 45–43
1941	Finals	Long Island	L 56–42
1969	First Round	West Texas State	W 82–80
1969	Second Round	Tennessee	L 75–64
1986	First Round	Ohio State	L 65–62
1995	First Round	George Washington	W 83–71
1995	Second Round	Iowa	L 66–62
2013	First Round	Denver	L 61–57

=== College Basketball Invitational results ===
The Bobcats appeared in three College Basketball Invitational in 2008, 2016, and 2022. Their combined record is 4–3.

Year	Round	Opponent	Result
2008	First Round	Brown	W 80–74
2008	Quarterfinals	Bradley	L 73–79
2016	First Round	Albany	W 94–90^{OT}
2016	Quarterfinals	UNC Greensboro	W 72–67
2016	Semifinals	Morehead State	L 72–77
2022	First Round	Rice	W 65-64
2022	Quarterfinals	Abilene Christian	L 91-86

=== CollegeInsider.com Postseason Tournament Results ===
The Bobcats made their first appearance in the third annual CollegeInsider.com Postseason Tournament in 2011. Their combined record is 3–2.

Year	Round	Opponent	Result
2011	First round	Marshall	W 65–64
2011	Quarterfinals	East Tennessee State	L 82–73
2014	First round	Cleveland State	W 64–62
2014	Second Round	Wright State	W 56–54
2014	Quarterfinals	VMI	L 90–92

== Coaching staff ==
Name	Position	Year	Alma mater
Jeff Boals	Head coach	2019	Ohio University 1995
Lamar Thornton	Assistant coach	2019	Ohio Dominican University 2015
Kyle Barlow	Assistant coach	2019	Concordia University Ann Arbor University of Michigan 2010,2014
Lee Martin	Assistant coach	2020	Catawba College 2013
Jake Ness	Director of Basketball Operations	2019	Boise State University Washington State University 2015,2017
Mike Cifliku	Video Coordinator	2022	Ohio University 2020,2022
Keith Williams	Graduate Assistant	2024	University of Charleston 2023

== Home arenas ==
- Ewing Hall, 1907-08. Built 1898, located north of the current Scripps Hall. Closed and demolished in 1974; site is now green space.
- Ohio Gymnasium, 1908-23. Located on Park Place east of the current Scripps Hall. Renamed Women's Gymnasium when the team moved to the Men's Gymnasium in 1923. Closed in the 1960s; the western portion of Alden Library now sits on the site.
- Men's Gymnasium, 1923-60. Located on President Street, it was converted to Bentley Hall in 1961 and is now a classroom building.
- Grover Center, 1960-68. Located on Richland Avenue opposite West Green Drive. Now used as classroom space.
- Convocation Center, 1968-Present. Located on Richland Avenue, southwest of the Grover Center and northwest of Peden Stadium. The 13,000-seat round arena has been home to Ohio basketball for almost 60 seasons.

== Bobcat basketball traditions ==
Ohio is a tradition-rich school, and many of those traditions are associated with athletics events, especially basketball. Some Ohio traditions include:

- Rufus the Bobcat — The school mascot, a fierce yet friendly looking Bobcat that always sports an Ohio jersey with a number "1" on the back.
- Ohio Varsity Band — The pep band which performs at every basketball game.
- "Stand Up and Cheer" — Ohio's fight song
- "Alma Mater, Ohio" — Ohio's alma mater song
- The "O Zone" — The student cheering section at every Ohio men's basketball game.
- "D-Lo's Crew" — A subgroup of The "O Zone" named after the first member of the O Zone Daniel Lowe who died at the Convo in a pick up game in 2005.

== Rivalries ==
Ohio's most heated rival is with Miami University. "The Battle of the Bricks" is an annual all-sports rivalry competition between the Ohio Bobcats and the Miami RedHawks athletic programs. The name "Battle of the Bricks" evolved from each school's reputation of having a campus of red brick buildings. Each varsity athletic competition in which the Bobcats and RedHawks meet including tournament play is counted as part of the years series record. At the conclusion of each academic year, the school with the most varsity wins takes the trophy back to their campus for the following year. Ohio also has a rival with Marshall called the Battle of the Bell.

== All-time records ==
=== All-time coaching records ===
Head coach	Period	W–L Record	Win %	W–L Record in Conference	Win %	Ohio Athletic Association Championships	Buckeye Athletic Association Championships	MAC Regular season championships
James C. Jones	1907–1910	10–10	.500	n/a	n/a	n/a	n/a	n/a
James Corbett	1910–1911	3–4	.428	n/a	n/a	n/a	n/a	n/a
Arthur W. Hinaman	1911–1912	2–9	.181	n/a	n/a	0	n/a	n/a
C.M. Douthit	1912–1913	5–8	.384	n/a	n/a	0	n/a	n/a
Mark B. Banks	1913–1918	28–43	.394	n/a	n/a	0	n/a	n/a
Frank Gullum	1918–1920	10–10	.500	n/a	n/a	0	n/a	n/a
Russel W. Finsterwald	1920–1922	34–6	.850	n/a	n/a	1	n/a	n/a
Butch Grover	1922–1938	192–129	.598	n/a	n/a	0	3	n/a
Dutch Trautwein	1938–1949	136–90	.601	10–15	.400	n/a	0	n/a
Jim Snyder	1949–1974	355–245	.592	176–113	.609	n/a	n/a	7
Dale Bandy	1974–1980	69–89	.436	36–58	.383	n/a	n/a	0
Danny Nee	1980–1986	107–67	.614	72–34	.679	n/a	n/a	1
Billy Hahn	1986–1989	42–45	.482	22–26	.458	n/a	n/a	0
Larry Hunter	1989–2001	204–148	.580	123–87	.586	n/a	n/a	1
Tim O'Shea	2001–2008	120–95	.558	65–57	.533	n/a	n/a	0
John Groce	2008–2012	85–56	.603	34–30	.531	n/a	n/a	0
Jim Christian	2012–2014	49–21	.700	25–9	.735	n/a	n/a	1
Saul Phillips	2014–2019	81–77	.513	40–50	.444	n/a	n/a	0
Jeff Boals	2019–present	132–94	.584	73–51	.589	n/a	n/a	0
Totals	1907–present	1,667–1247	.572	676–532	.560	1	3	10

As of 11-18-2026

=== Top Ten Winning Coaches ===
Head coach	Period	W–L Record	Win %	W–L Record in Conference	Win %
Jim Snyder	1949–1974	355–245	.592	176–113	.609
Larry Hunter	1989–2001	204–148	.580	123–87	.586
Butch Grover	1922–1938	192–129	.598	n/a	n/a
Dutch Trautwein	1938–1949	136–90	.601	10–15	.400
Jeff Boals	2019–present	132–94	.584	73–51	.589
Tim O'Shea	2001–2008	120–95	.558	65–57	.533
Danny Nee	1980–1986	107–67	.614	72–34	.679
John Groce	2008–2012	85–56	.603	34–30	.531
Saul Phillips	2014–2019	81–77	.513	40–50	.444
Dale Bandy	1974–1980	69–89	.436	36–58	.383

=== All-time MAC records ===
The Bobcats have won 7 Mid-American Conference tournament titles in 1983, 1985, 1994, 2005, 2010, 2012, and 2021 as well as 10 MAC regular-season titles in 1960, 1961, 1964, 1965, 1970, 1972, 1974,1985, 1994, and 2013. Through March 1, 2025, Ohio owns an all-time MAC record of 676–532 (.560) in 79 seasons of league competition. The following are the records against MAC times in regular-season play:

Opponent	W–L record	Win %	Year Joined the MAC
Akron	32–35	.478	1992
Ball State	50–29	.633	1973
Bowling Green	65–73	.471	1952
Buffalo	36–16	.692	1998
Central Michigan	51–31	.622	1971
Eastern Michigan	55–27	.671	1971
Kent State	96–55	.636	1951
Miami University	79–77	.506	1947
Toledo	63–64	.496	1950
UMass	1–1	.500	2025
Western Michigan	69–64	.519	1947
Northern Illinois	37–21	.638	1975-1986
Northern Illinois	37–21	.638	1997
Butler	1–6	.143	1946-1949
Cincinnati	3–9	.250	1946-1953
Marshall	28–21	.571	1954-1969
Marshall	28–21	.571	1997-2005
Case Western Reserve	13–3	.813	1946-1955
Total	667–522	.561	

=== All-time Leading Scorers ===
Player	Period	Career PTS
Dave Jamerson	1986-90	2,336
Paul Graham	1986-89	2,170
Gary Trent	1993-95	2,108
D.J. Cooper	2010-13	2,075
Brandon Hunter	2000-03	2,012
Geno Ford	1994-97	1,752
Steve Skaggs	1976-79	1,741
Leon Williams	2005-08	1,716
Jerome Tillman	2006-09	1,635
Walter Luckett	1973-75	1,625

== Ohio's all-time NBA draft selections ==
- Frank Baumholtz, 1946, (Cleveland)
- Richard Schrider, 1948 (New York)
- Howard Jolliff, 1960 (Minneapolis)
- Larry Kruger, 1961 (Cincinnati)
- Jerry Jackson, 1964 (Detroit)
- Bunk Adams, 1965 (Baltimore)
- John Schroeder, 1967 (Seattle)
- Gerald McKee, 1969 (Baltimore)
- John Canine, 1970 (Phoenix)
- Greg McDivitt, 1970 (Phoenix)
- Ken Kowall, 1971 (Philadelphia)
- Craig Love, 1971 (Buffalo)
- Tom Corde, 1972 (New York)
- Walter Luckett, 1975 (Detroit)
- Steve Skaggs, 1979 (Cleveland)
- Tim Joyce, 1979 (Cleveland)
- John Devereaux, 1984 (San Antonio)
- Dave Jamerson, 1990 (Miami)
- Paul "Snoopy" Graham, 1991 (Atlanta)
- Gary Trent, 1995 (Milwaukee)
- Brandon Hunter, 2003 (Boston)
- Jason Preston, 2021 (Orlando)

== Ohio's players in international leagues ==
- Maurice Ndour (born 1992), Senegalese player for Hapoel Jerusalem of the Israeli Basketball Premier League
