= 1927 Northern Arizona Lumberjacks football team =

American college football season

1927 Northern Arizona Lumberjacks football
- Conference: Independent
- Record: 6–1–2
- Head coach: Rudy Lavik (1st season)
- Home stadium: McMullen Field

1927 Western college football independents records
| | Conf. | | | Overall |
| Team | W | L | T | W | | L | | T |
|---|---|---|---|---|---|---|---|---|
| New Mexico | | – | | 8 | – | 0 | – | 1 |
| Hawaii | | – | | 5 | – | 2 | – | 0 |
| Arizona | | – | | 4 | – | 2 | – | 1 |
| Regis | | – | | 5 | – | 3 | – | 0 |
| Gonzaga | | – | | 5 | – | 3 | – | 1 |
| Santa Clara | | – | | 5 | – | 4 | – | 2 |
| Loyola (CA) | | – | | 4 | – | 3 | – | 1 |
| Tempe State | | – | | 2 | – | 3 | – | 1 |
| New Mexico A&M | | – | | 3 | – | 5 | – | 1 |
| Humboldt State | | – | | 1 | – | 2 | – | 0 |

The 1927 Northern Arizona Lumberjacks football team was an American football team that represented Northern Arizona Teachers College (now known as Northern Arizona University) as an independent during the 1927 college football season. The Lumberjacks compiled a 6–1–2 record, shut out eight of nine opponents, and outscored all opponents by a total of 208 to 24.

Rudy Lavik was the team's head coach. He was assisted by Edward Voltmer. The team played its home games at McMullen Field in Flagstaff, Arizona.

== Schedule ==
| Date | Opponent | Site | Result | Source |
|---|---|---|---|---|
| September 24 | Prescott Athletic Club | McMullen Field; Flagstaff, AZ | W 27–0 | |
| October 8 | Phoenix Junior College | McMullen Field; Flagstaff, AZ | T 0–0 | |
| October 15 | at Gila College | Thatcher, AZ | W 32–0 | |
| October 22 | Tempe State^{†} | McMullen Field; Flagstaff, AZ | W 19–0 | |
| October 29 | Loyola (CA) | McMullen Field; Flagstaff, AZ | T 0–0 | |
| November 5 | Phoenix Indian School | McMullen Field; Flagstaff, AZ | W 39–0 | |
| November 11 | at New Mexico | Albuquerque, NM | L 7–24 | |
| | at Winslow Athletic Club | | W 71–0 | |
| November 24 | at Montezuma College | East Las Vegas, NM | W 6–0 | |
^{†}Homecoming
