= Biff Hoffman =

American football player (1904–1954)

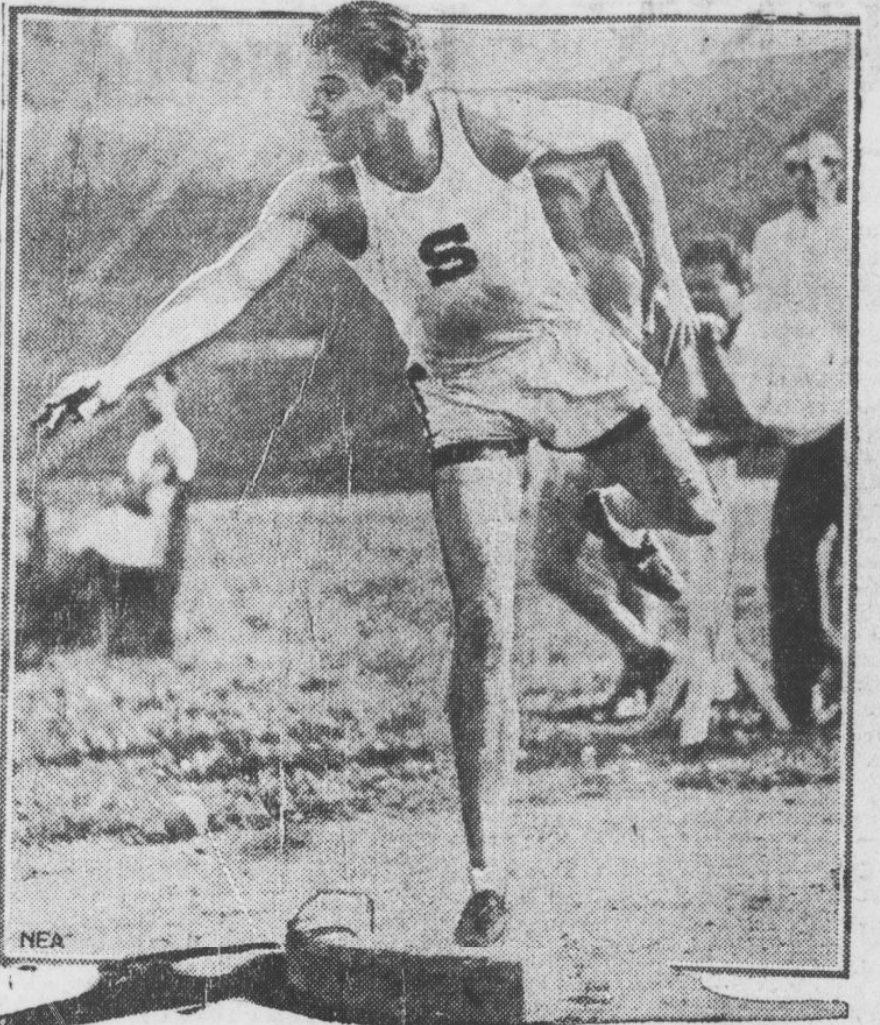
- Hoffman throwing the javelin, 1927

Profile
- Position: Fullback

Personal information
- Born: May 11, 1903
- Died: January 29, 1954 (aged 50); San Francisco, California, U.S.

Career information
- College: Stanford

Awards and highlights
- Second-team All-American (1928); Third-team All-American (1927); First-team All-PCC (1927); 1928 Rose Bowl MVP

Clifford Pierson "Biff" Hoffman (May 11, 1903 – January 29, 1954) was an American football player and track and field star of the 1920s. He set a collegiate discus record in 1925 and was captain of the 1927 Stanford Indians football team, kicking the winning point after touchdown in the 1928 Rose Bowl Game.

== Early life ==
Hoffman attended Petaluma High School in Petaluma, California, and then went on to attend Stanford University.

== Career ==
=== Track and field ===
At Stanford, Hoffman was on the track and field team, where he threw the discus and shot put. He set an NCAA discus record in 1925 with a discus throw of 148 feet 4 inches (45.21 m), helping Stanford win the 1925 NCAA Men's Track and Field Championships.

=== Stanford football ===
Hoffman as a junior at Stanford in 1926.

Hoffman was also a fullback on Stanford's football team under legendary coach Pop Warner. The 1926 Stanford football team went undefeated in the regular season, outscoring its opponents 268–73, and then faced also-undefeated Alabama in the 1927 Rose Bowl. The teams played to a 7–7 tie and were named co-national champions by most media.

In 1927, Hoffman was named team captain and helped lead the team to the 1928 Rose Bowl, facing the Pitt Panthers. Behind 6–0 in the third quarter, Hoffman caught a screen pass and raced toward the end zone, but fumbled short of the goal line; another Stanford player, Frankie Wilton, picked up the fumble and ran the ball in for the touchdown. Hoffman then kicked the extra point and the score held, giving Stanford a 7–6 victory, its first Rose Bowl win in four attempts. Hoffman was retroactively named the game's most outstanding player when the award was created in 1954.

=== Post-football career ===
In 1930, Hoffman married fellow Stanford graduate Claire Giannini, daughter of Bank of America founder Amadeo Giannini. Hoffman worked as an investment banker in San Francisco, and died in 1954 of complications related to an ulcer in his esophagus.
