= Morley Drury =

American football player (1903–1989)

Profile
- Position: Quarterback

Personal information
- Born: February 15, 1903; Midland, Ontario, Canada
- Died: January 21, 1989 (aged 85); Santa Monica, California, U.S.
- Listed height: 6 ft 0 in (1.83 m)
- Listed weight: 185 lb (84 kg)

Career information
- High school: Long Beach Tech
- College: USC (1925–1927)

Awards and highlights
- Consensus All-American (1927); Third-team All-American (1925); 2× First-team All-PCC (1925, 1927); Midland Sports Hall of Fame

Morley Edward Drury (February 15, 1903 – January 21, 1989), nicknamed "the Noblest Trojan of Them All," was a quarterback for the University of Southern California.

== College career ==
A graduate of Long Beach Polytechnic High School, Drury was a prominent quarterback for the USC Trojans of the University of Southern California, helping coach Howard Jones in leading USC during the 1920s.

Drury's finest season came in 1927 as the senior captain employed his skillful passing and rushing to carry the Trojans to an 8–1–1 record. USC shared the Pacific Coast Conference title with Stanford University, battling the Indians to a 13–13 deadlock. The only smudge on the Trojan record was a mid-season loss to powerful Notre Dame, 7–6. Drury had 180 yards and three touchdowns against Washington, prompting the crowd at Memorial Coliseum to give him a 10-minute standing ovation. Drury led the team in scoring (76 points) and rushing (1163 yards) and won first-team All-America honors. His 1163 yards marked the first time a USC player surpassed 1,000 yards rushing and stood as a USC record until Mike Garrett eclipsed the mark with 1440 yards during his 1965 Heisman Trophy campaign.

Drury was elected to the College Football Hall of Fame in 1954. Drury died in 1989. In 2010, Morley Drury joined his late brother, former NHL hockey player and United States Olympian Herb Drury, as an inductee of the Midland (Ontario) Sports Hall of Fame, in the Athlete category.
