= Claire Giannini Hoffman =

American businesswoman

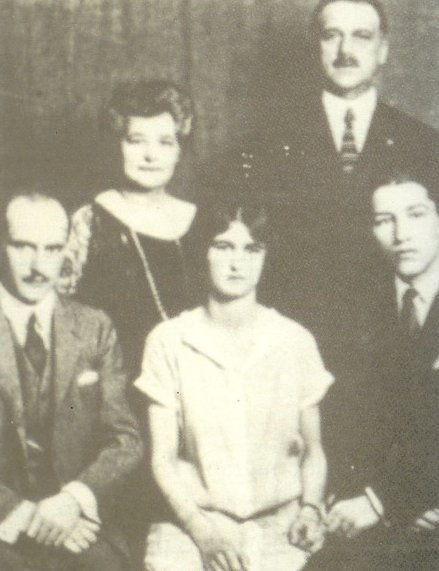
Claire Giannini (c. 1920) in center with parents and brothers Lawrence and Virgil

Claire Giannini Hoffman (December 30, 1904 – December 20, 1997) was the first woman to serve on the boards of Bank of America and Sears, Roebuck & Company. She also was the only woman guest invited at international bank conference events for some two decades.

== Early life ==
Born Claire Evelyn Giannini in San Francisco, California, on December 30, 1904. Her father was Amadeo Peter Giannini, founder of the Bank of America. Her mother was Clorinda "Clara" Agnes Cuneo. She attended San Mateo Grammar School, San Mateo High School, Rosemary Hall in Greenwich, Connecticut, Ransom School in Piedmont, California, Bryn Mawr College in Pennsylvania, Mills College in Oakland, California, and a business school in Beverly Hills, California.

== Career ==
Hoffman became engaged in her father's banking enterprises and was his secretarial assistant during his business trips around the United States and Europe. He died in 1949 and she then took over his seat on Bank of America's board of directors, becoming the bank's first female director. Her brother Lawrence died in 1952 and she took over his position in the bank also.

Hoffman was deeply loyal to her father's banking principles and policies. Her relationships with the bank's management were often tempestuous, since they had their own different agendas as to how the bank should be managed. She resigned from the board of the Bank of America in 1985 because she felt the bank's executives were irresponsible in their management. The major issue she was disheartened over was the sale of the bank's World Headquarters at 555 California Street – which she considered sacred as a testament to her father. She further protested showing her displeasure by boycotting the annual meeting of the board of directors in 1987.

Hoffman credited her mother with teaching her how to focus on specific corporate goals. Women in business was uncommon at the time. Hoffman was a pioneer in women business opportunities and equal pay. For about 20 years she was the only woman guest invited at international bank conference events for the International Monetary Fund, the International Bank for Reconstruction and Development, and the International Development Association. She was the only honorary member of the American Institute of Banking in 1977. She was the first woman appointed to the board of regents of St. Mary's College of California.

Hoffman was chosen by President Eisenhower to serve on the National Council of Consultants to the United States Small Business Administration. She was a U.S. delegate to the Atlantic Congress in London in 1959 and a member of its Free Trade and Exchange of Currency Committee. She also became a member of the board of trustees of the Center for Global Development. She was made the only honorary member of the American Bankers Association in 1962. In 1963, she became the first female director on Sears, Roebuck & Company's board.

Hoffman was sent to Geneva as U.S. delegate to the United Nations Conference on Trade and Development in 1964. In 1965 President Lyndon Johnson asked her to be a director of the Export-Import Bank of the United States. President Nixon appointed her to the Financial Investment Advisory Panel of Amtrak in 1970. In 1972, she became the first female member of the Board of Regents of St. Mary's College. In 1973, Federal Reserve Board Chairman Arthur Burns and President Nixon asked Hoffman to become the governor of the Federal Reserve Board. A condition for the position was that she had break her ties with Bank of America totally. She turned down the job.

She received honorary memberships and accolades by several organizations. Some were the United States Chamber of Commerce, the Association of California County Treasurers, the Soroptimist Club of San Francisco, the San Francisco Board of Supervisors, the U.S. Small Business Administration, the California Lieutenant Governors' Club and the San Francisco Opera company.

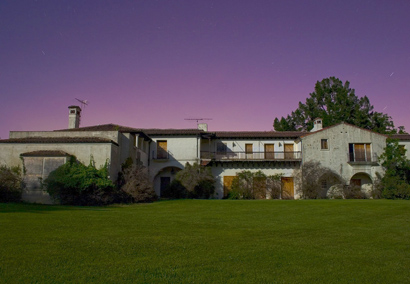
Jackling House in ruins, c. 2007

== Hobbies ==
Hoffman enjoyed ballroom dancing and golfing as hobbies. She also loved horseback riding and took it more seriously than just a hobby. On her 11-acre (4.5 ha) multimillion-dollar horse property in Woodside, California, she had stables for her horses. The property was known as the Jackling House Stables and Grounds. The stables separately were called "Champagne Paddock."

== Family ==
In 1930 Claire Giannini married Biff Hoffman, All-American sports star at Stanford University who was also an investment banker. After 24 years of marriage Biff died in 1954. They had no children.

== Death ==
Hoffman died December 20, 1997, at the family home in San Mateo, California. The family home has been historically known as "Seven Oaks". The 7,150-square-foot (664 m^{2}) mansion is on the National Register of Historic Places.

== Sources ==
- Read, Phyllis J. (1992). The Book of Women's Firsts: Breakthrough Achievements of Almost 1,000 American Women. Random House Information Group. ISBN 978-0-679-40975-5.
