= 1927 California Golden Bears football team =

American college football season

1927 California Golden Bears football
- Captain Fritz Coltrin
- Conference: Pacific Coast Conference
- Record: 7–3 (2–3 PCC)
- Head coach: Nibs Price (2nd season)
- Captain: Fritz Coltrin
- Home stadium: California Memorial Stadium

Uniform
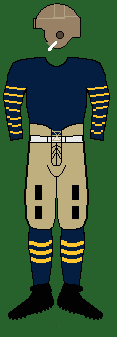

1927 Pacific Coast Conference football standings
	Conf.					Overall
Team	W		L		T	W		L		T
Stanford ^ +	4	–	0	–	1	8	–	2	–	1
No. 10 USC +	4	–	0	–	1	8	–	1	–	1
Idaho +	2	–	0	–	2	4	–	1	–	3
Washington	4	–	2	–	0	9	–	2	–	0
Oregon State	2	–	3	–	0	3	–	3	–	1
California	2	–	3	–	0	7	–	3	–	0
Washington State	1	–	3	–	1	3	–	3	–	2
Oregon	0	–	4	–	1	2	–	4	–	1
Montana	0	–	4	–	0	3	–	4	–	1
+ – Conference co-champions; ^ – Selected as Rose Bowl representative; Rankings from Dickinson System

The 1927 California Golden Bears football team was an American football team that represented the University of California, Berkeley during the 1927 college football season. Under head coach Nibs Price, the team compiled an overall record of 7–3 and 2–3 in conference.

== Schedule ==
Date	Opponent	Site	Result	Attendance	Source
September 24	Santa Clara*	California Memorial Stadium; Berkeley, CA	W 14–6	30,000	
October 1	Nevada*	California Memorial Stadium; Berkeley, CA	W 54–0		
October 8	Saint Mary's*	California Memorial Stadium; Berkeley, CA	W 13–0	> 70,000	
October 15	at Oregon	Multnomah Stadium; Portland, OR	W 16–0		
October 22	Olympic Club*	California Memorial Stadium; Berkeley, CA	W 21–0	30,000	
October 29	at USC	Los Angeles Memorial Coliseum; Los Angeles, CA	L 0–13	76,500	
November 5	Montana	California Memorial Stadium; Berkeley, CA	W 33–13		
November 12	Washington	California Memorial Stadium; Berkeley, CA	L 0–6	40,000	
November 19	at Stanford	Stanford Stadium; Stanford, CA (Big Game)	L 6–13	88,000	
December 31	Penn*	California Memorial Stadium; Berkeley, CA	W 27–13		
*Non-conference game
