= 1927 Montana Grizzlies football team =

American college football season

1927 Montana Grizzlies football
- Conference: Pacific Coast Conference
- Record: 3–4–1 (0–4 PCC)
- Head coach: Frank W. Milburn (2nd season)
- Home stadium: Dornblaser Field

1927 Pacific Coast Conference football standings
	Conf.					Overall
Team	W		L		T	W		L		T
Stanford ^ +	4	–	0	–	1	8	–	2	–	1
No. 10 USC +	4	–	0	–	1	8	–	1	–	1
Idaho +	2	–	0	–	2	4	–	1	–	3
Washington	4	–	2	–	0	9	–	2	–	0
Oregon State	2	–	3	–	0	3	–	3	–	1
California	2	–	3	–	0	7	–	3	–	0
Washington State	1	–	3	–	1	3	–	3	–	2
Oregon	0	–	4	–	1	2	–	4	–	1
Montana	0	–	4	–	0	3	–	4	–	1
+ – Conference co-champions; ^ – Selected as Rose Bowl representative; Rankings from Dickinson System

The 1927 Montana Grizzlies football team represented the University of Montana in the 1927 college football season as a member of the Pacific Coast Conference (PCC). The Grizzlies were led by second-year head coach Frank W. Milburn, played their home games at Dornblaser Field and finished the season with a record of three wins, four losses and one tie (3–4–1, 0–4 PCC).

== Schedule ==
Date	Opponent	Site	Result	Attendance	Source
September 24	Butte Centervilles*	Dornblaser Field; Missoula, MT	W 19–0		
October 1	Mount St. Charles*	Dornblaser Field; Missoula, MT	W 8–0		
October 8	at Washington State	Rogers Field; Pullman, WA	L 0–35	9,000	
October 15	Washington	Dornblaser Field; Missoula, MT	L 0–32	2,500	
October 22	at Idaho	MacLean Field; Moscow, ID (rivalry)	L 6–42		
November 5	at California	California Memorial Stadium; Berkeley, CA	L 13–33		
November 12	at Gonzaga*	Spokane, WA	T 0–0		
November 19	vs. Montana State*	Clark Park; Butte, MT (rivalry)	W 6–0	5,500	
*Non-conference game
