= 1927 Oregon Webfoots football team =

American college football season

1927 Oregon Webfoots football
- Conference: Pacific Coast Conference
- Record: 2–4–1 (0–4–1 PCC)
- Head coach: John McEwan (2nd season)
- Captain: Beryl Hodgen
- Home stadium: Hayward Field

1927 Pacific Coast Conference football standings
	Conf.					Overall
Team	W		L		T	W		L		T
Stanford ^ +	4	–	0	–	1	8	–	2	–	1
No. 10 USC +	4	–	0	–	1	8	–	1	–	1
Idaho +	2	–	0	–	2	4	–	1	–	3
Washington	4	–	2	–	0	9	–	2	–	0
Oregon State	2	–	3	–	0	3	–	3	–	1
California	2	–	3	–	0	7	–	3	–	0
Washington State	1	–	3	–	1	3	–	3	–	2
Oregon	0	–	4	–	1	2	–	4	–	1
Montana	0	–	4	–	0	3	–	4	–	1
+ – Conference co-champions; ^ – Selected as Rose Bowl representative; Rankings from Dickinson System

The 1927 Oregon Webfoots football team represented the University of Oregon in the 1927 college football season. It was the Webfoots' 34th overall and 12th season as a member of the Pacific Coast Conference (PCC). The team was led by head coach John McEwan, in his second year, and played their home games at Hayward Field in Eugene and at Multnomah Field in Portland. They finished the season with a record of two wins, four losses and one tie (2–4–1 overall, 0–4–1 in the PCC).

== Schedule ==
Date	Opponent	Site	Result	Attendance	Source
September 24	Linfield*	Hayward Field; Eugene, OR	W 7–0		
October 1	Pacific (OR)*	Hayward Field; Eugene, OR	W 32–6		
October 8	Idaho	Hayward Field; Eugene, OR	T 0–0	7,000	
October 15	California	Multnomah Field; Portland, OR	L 0–16		
October 29	at Stanford	Stanford Stadium; Stanford, CA	L 0–19		
November 11	Oregon State^{†}	Hayward Field; Eugene, OR (rivalry)	L 7–21	18,000	
November 24	at Washington	Husky Stadium; Seattle, WA (rivalry)	L 0–7	17,236	
*Non-conference game; ^{†}Homecoming
