= 1933 Ohio Bobcats football team =

American college football season

1933 Ohio Bobcats football
- Conference: Buckeye Athletic Association
- Record: 6–2–1 (3–1–1 BAA)
- Head coach: Don Peden (10th season)
- Home stadium: Ohio Field

1933 Buckeye Athletic Association football standings
	Conf.					Overall
Team	W		L		T	W		L		T
Cincinnati +	4	–	1	–	0	7	–	2	–	0
Miami (OH) +	4	–	1	–	0	7	–	2	–	0
Ohio	3	–	1	–	1	6	–	2	–	1
Ohio Wesleyan	2	–	3	–	0	6	–	4	–	0
Marshall	1	–	3	–	1	3	–	5	–	1
Wittenberg	0	–	5	–	0	2	–	6	–	0
+ – Conference co-champions

The 1933 Ohio Bobcats football team was an American football team that represented Ohio University as a member of the Buckeye Athletic Association (BAA) during the 1933 college football season. In their tenth season under head coach Don Peden, the Bobcats compiled a 6–2–1 record, shut out six of nine opponents, and outscored all opponents by a total of 227 to 28.

== Schedule ==
Date	Opponent	Site	Result	Attendance	Source
September 30	Morris Harvey	Ohio Field; Athens, OH	W 61–0		
October 7	at Purdue	Ross–Ade Stadium; West Lafayette, IN	L 6–13		
October 14	Franklin	Ohio Field; Athens, OH	W 78–0		
October 21	Miami (OH)	Ohio Field; Athens, OH (rivalry)	W 6–0		
October 28	Transylvania	Ohio Field; Athens, OH	W 68–0		
November 4	at Wittenberg	Springfield, OH	W 39–0		
November 11	at Marshall	Fairfield Stadium; Huntington, WV (rivalry)	T 0–0	7,000	
November 18	at Cincinnati	Nippert Stadium; Cincinnati, OH	L 0–2		
November 25	Ohio Wesleyan	Ohio Field; Athens, OH	W 19–13		
