= 1927 USC Trojans football team =

American college football season

1927 USC Trojans football

PCC co-champion
- Conference: Pacific Coast Conference
- Record: 8–1–1 (4–0–1 PCC)
- Head coach: Howard Jones (3rd season)
- Offensive scheme: Single-wing
- Captain: Morley Drury
- Home stadium: Los Angeles Memorial Coliseum

1927 Pacific Coast Conference football standings
	Conf.					Overall
Team	W		L		T	W		L		T
Stanford ^ +	4	–	0	–	1	8	–	2	–	1
No. 10 USC +	4	–	0	–	1	8	–	1	–	1
Idaho +	2	–	0	–	2	4	–	1	–	3
Washington	4	–	2	–	0	9	–	2	–	0
Oregon State	2	–	3	–	0	3	–	3	–	1
California	2	–	3	–	0	7	–	3	–	0
Washington State	1	–	3	–	1	3	–	3	–	2
Oregon	0	–	4	–	1	2	–	4	–	1
Montana	0	–	4	–	0	3	–	4	–	1
+ – Conference co-champions; ^ – Selected as Rose Bowl representative; Rankings from Dickinson System

The 1927 USC Trojans football team represented the University of Southern California (USC) in the 1927 college football season. In their third year under head coach Howard Jones, the Trojans compiled an 8–1–1 record (4–0–1 against conference opponents), tied with Stanford and Idaho for the Pacific Coast Conference championship, and outscored their opponents by a combined total of 287 to 64. The season featured the first game in the Notre Dame–USC football rivalry; Notre Dame won by a 13 to 12 score in Los Angeles. The team was ranked No. 10 in the nation in the Dickinson System ratings released in December 1927.

== Schedule ==
Date	Opponent	Site	Result	Attendance	Source
September 24	Occidental*	Los Angeles Memorial Coliseum; Los Angeles, CA	W 33–0	20,000	
October 1	Santa Clara*	Los Angeles Memorial Coliseum; Los Angeles, CA	W 52–12	35,000	
October 8	Oregon State	Los Angeles Memorial Coliseum; Los Angeles, CA	W 13–12	35,000	
October 15	at Stanford	Stanford Stadium; Stanford, CA (rivalry)	T 13–13	65,000	
October 22	Caltech*	Los Angeles Memorial Coliseum; Los Angeles, CA	W 51–0	25,000	
October 29	California	Los Angeles Memorial Coliseum; Los Angeles, CA	W 13–0	76,500	
November 12	Colorado*	Los Angeles Memorial Coliseum; Los Angeles, CA	W 46–7	25,000	
November 19	Washington State	Los Angeles Memorial Coliseum; Los Angeles, CA	W 27–0	45,000	
November 26	vs. Notre Dame*	Soldier Field; Chicago, IL (rivalry)	L 6–7	117,000	
December 3	Washington^{†}	Los Angeles Memorial Coliseum; Los Angeles, CA	W 33–13	60,000	
*Non-conference game; ^{†}Homecoming

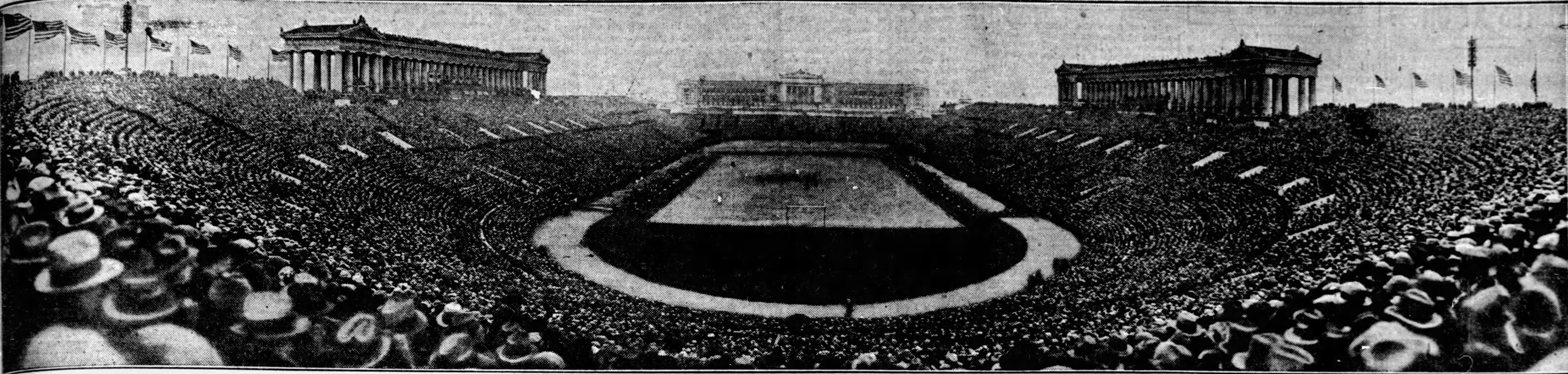
USC plays Notre Dame at Soldier Field in Chicago
