= 1927 Washington State Cougars football team =

American college football season

1927 Washington State Cougars football
- Conference: Pacific Coast Conference
- Record: 3–3–2 (1–3–1 PCC)
- Head coach: Babe Hollingbery (2nd season)
- Home stadium: Rogers Field

1927 Pacific Coast Conference football standings
	Conf.					Overall
Team	W		L		T	W		L		T
Stanford ^ +	4	–	0	–	1	8	–	2	–	1
No. 10 USC +	4	–	0	–	1	8	–	1	–	1
Idaho +	2	–	0	–	2	4	–	1	–	3
Washington	4	–	2	–	0	9	–	2	–	0
Oregon State	2	–	3	–	0	3	–	3	–	1
California	2	–	3	–	0	7	–	3	–	0
Washington State	1	–	3	–	1	3	–	3	–	2
Oregon	0	–	4	–	1	2	–	4	–	1
Montana	0	–	4	–	0	3	–	4	–	1
+ – Conference co-champions; ^ – Selected as Rose Bowl representative; Rankings from Dickinson System

The 1927 Washington State Cougars football team was an American football team that represented Washington State College during the 1927 college football season. Head coach Babe Hollingbery led the team to a 1–3–1 mark in the PCC and 3–3–2 overall.

During the Homecoming tie against Palouse neighbor Idaho on Friday, November 11, Governor Roland Hartley presented a cougar cub to the WSC students. The cub was originally to be called "Governor Hartley," in honor of its donor. The governor gracefully declined and suggested the name "Butch," in honor of senior quarterback Herbert "Butch" Meeker of Spokane.

== Schedule ==
Date	Opponent	Site	Result	Attendance	Source
September 24	Mount St. Charles*	Rogers Field; Pullman, WA	T 6–6	3,000	
October 1	College of Idaho*	Rogers Field; Pullman, WA	W 53–0	4,000	
October 8	Montana	Rogers Field; Pullman, WA	W 35–0	9,000	
October 15	at Gonzaga*	Gonzaga Stadium; Spokane, WA	W 13–0	8,000	
October 22	at Washington	Husky Stadium; Seattle, WA (rivalry)	L 0–14	35,000	
October 29	at Oregon State	Bell Field; Corvallis, OR	L 6–13	10,000	
November 11	Idaho	Rogers Field; Pullman, WA (rivalry)	T 7–7	15,000	
November 19	at USC	Los Angeles Memorial Coliseum; Los Angeles, CA	L 0–27	45,000	
*Non-conference game
