= 1927 Oregon State Beavers football team =

American college football season

1927 Oregon State Beavers football
- Conference: Pacific Coast Conference
- Record: 3–3–1 (2–3 PCC)
- Head coach: Paul J. Schissler (4th season)
- Home stadium: Bell Field

1927 Pacific Coast Conference football standings
	Conf.					Overall
Team	W		L		T	W		L		T
Stanford ^ +	4	–	0	–	1	8	–	2	–	1
No. 10 USC +	4	–	0	–	1	8	–	1	–	1
Idaho +	2	–	0	–	2	4	–	1	–	3
Washington	4	–	2	–	0	9	–	2	–	0
Oregon State	2	–	3	–	0	3	–	3	–	1
California	2	–	3	–	0	7	–	3	–	0
Washington State	1	–	3	–	1	3	–	3	–	2
Oregon	0	–	4	–	1	2	–	4	–	1
Montana	0	–	4	–	0	3	–	4	–	1
+ – Conference co-champions; ^ – Selected as Rose Bowl representative; Rankings from Dickinson System

The 1927 Oregon State Beavers football team, also known as the "Aggies" in this era, represented Oregon State Agricultural College in the Pacific Coast Conference (PCC) during the 1927 college football season. In their fourth season under head coach Paul J. Schissler, the Beavers compiled a 3–3–1 record (2–3 in PCC, fifth) and outscored their opponents 98 to 78. Under coach Schissler, from 1925 to 1932, no team captains were elected. The team played its home games on campus at Bell Field in Corvallis, Oregon.

Program for the season opener against the Cal Aggies (today's UC Davis).

== Schedule ==
Date	Opponent	Site	Result	Attendance	Source
October 1	Cal Aggies*	Bell Field; Corvallis, OR	W 25–6	"a fair crowd"	
October 8	at USC	Los Angeles Memorial Coliseum; Los Angeles, CA	L 12–13	35,000	
October 22	Stanford	Multnomah Stadium; Portland, OR	L 6–20	20,000	
October 29	Washington State	Bell Field; Corvallis, OR	W 13–6	10,000	
November 11	at Oregon	Hayward Field; Eugene, OR (rivalry)	W 21–7	18,000	
November 19	Idaho	Multnomah Stadium; Portland, OR	L 7–12	12,000	
November 26	Carnegie Tech*	Multnomah Stadium; Portland, OR	T 14–14	8,000	
*Non-conference game
