= 1933 Marshall Thundering Herd football team =

American college football season

1933 Marshall Thundering Herd football
- Conference: Buckeye Athletic Association, West Virginia Athletic Conference
- Record: 3–5–1 (1–3–1 BAA, 0–1 WVAC)
- Head coach: Tom Dandelet (3rd season)
- Captain: Marvin Wooley
- Home stadium: Fairfield Stadium

1933 Buckeye Athletic Association football standings
	Conf.					Overall
Team	W		L		T	W		L		T
Cincinnati +	4	–	1	–	0	7	–	2	–	0
Miami (OH) +	4	–	1	–	0	7	–	2	–	0
Ohio	3	–	1	–	1	6	–	2	–	1
Ohio Wesleyan	2	–	3	–	0	6	–	4	–	0
Marshall	1	–	3	–	1	3	–	5	–	1
Wittenberg	0	–	5	–	0	2	–	6	–	0
+ – Conference co-champions

1933 West Virginia Athletic Conference football standings
	Conf.					Overall
Team	W		L		T	W		L		T
Davis & Elkins $	5	–	0	–	0	9	–	1	–	1
Salem	7	–	1	–	0	7	–	1	–	0
Fairmont State	3	–	1	–	0	6	–	1	–	0
West Virginia Wesleyan	2	–	2	–	0	4	–	7	–	0
West Liberty State	1	–	3	–	1	2	–	4	–	2
Glenville State	1	–	3	–	1	2	–	4	–	1
Morris Harvey	0	–	5	–	0	1	–	8	–	0
Concord *	2	–	1	–	0	4	–	3	–	0
New River State *	1	–	1	–	0	4	–	2	–	0
Shepherd *	1	–	2	–	0	5	–	2	–	0
Marshall *	0	–	1	–	0	3	–	5	–	1
Potomac State *	0	–	3	–	0	2	–	4	–	0
$ – Conference champion; * – Did not qualify for conference standings Ties did not count in conference standings.

The 1933 Marshall Thundering Herd football team was an American football team that represented Marshall College (now Marshall University) as a member of the Buckeye Athletic Association (BAA) and the West Virginia Athletic Conference (WVAC) during the 1933 college football season. In its third season under head coach Tom Dandelet, the Thundering Herd compiled an overall record of 3–5–1 record and outscored opponents by a total of 109 to 103. Marshall had a record of 1–3–1 in BAA play, placing fifth, and a record of 0–1 against WVAC opponents, but did not play enough conference games to qualify for the WVAC standings. Marvin Wooley was the team captain.

== Schedule ==
Date	Opponent	Site	Result	Attendance	Source
September 30	Transylvania*	Fairfield Stadium; Huntington, WV	W 38–0		
October 7	Wittenberg	Fairfield Stadium; Huntington, WV	W 19–0		
October 14	at Miami (OH)	Miami Field; Oxford, OH	L 14–42		
October 21	at Cincinnati	Carson Field; Cincinnati, OH	L 0–19	11,000	
October 28	Georgetown (KY)*	Fairfield Stadium; Huntington, WV	W 32–6		
November 4	vs. Emory and Henry*	Wade Stadium; Bluefield, WV	L 0–12	2,500	
November 11	Ohio	Fairfield Stadium; Huntington, WV (rivalry)	T 0–0	7,000	
November 18	at Ohio Wesleyan	Selby Field; Delaware, OH	L 0–12		
November 30	West Virginia Wesleyan^{†}	Fairfield Stadium; Huntington, WV	L 6–12		
*Non-conference game; ^{†}Homecoming
