= 1927 Cal Poly Mustangs football team =

American college football season

1927 Cal Poly Mustangs football
- Conference: California Coast Conference
- Record: 2–4–1 (1–4 CCC)
- Head coach: Al Agosti (7th season)

1927 California Coast Conference football standings
| | Conf. | | | | | Overall |
| Team | W | | L | | T | W | | L | | T |
|---|---|---|---|---|---|---|---|---|---|---|
| Sacramento $ | 6 | – | 0 | – | 0 | ? | – | ? | – | ? |
| Chico State | 5 | – | 1 | – | 0 | 6 | – | 2 | – | 0 |
| Modesto | 4 | – | 2 | – | 0 | 5 | – | 3 | – | 0 |
| Santa Barbara State | 2 | – | 1 | – | 0 | 3 | – | 5 | – | 0 |
| San Jose State | 3 | – | 3 | – | 0 | 4 | – | 5 | – | 0 |
| Cal Poly | 1 | – | 4 | – | 0 | 2 | – | 4 | – | 1 |
| Bakersfield | | | – | | | 0 | – | 3 | – | 1 |
| San Mateo | | | – | | | | | – |
| Santa Rosa | | | – | | | | | – |
$ – Conference champion

The 1927 Cal Poly Mustangs football team represented California Polytechnic School—now known as California Polytechnic State University, San Luis Obispo—as a member of the California Coast Conference (CCC) during the 1927 college football season. Led by seventh-year head coach Al Agosti, Cal Poly compiled an overall record of 2–4–1 with a mark of 1–4 in conference play. The team was outscored by its opponents 93 to 46 for the season. The Mustangs played home games in San Luis Obispo, California.

Cal Poly was a two-year school until 1941.

== Schedule ==
| Date | Opponent | Site | Result |
|---|---|---|---|
| September 24 | at Santa Maria High School* | Santa Maria, CA | T 6–6 |
| October 8 | at Loyola (CA) freshmen* | Los Angeles, CA | L 6–7 |
| October 15 | Chico State | San Luis Obispo, CA | L 0–19 |
| October 22 | Bakersfield | San Luis Obispo, CA | W 1–0 (forfeit win) |
| November 5 | Santa Barbara State | San Luis Obispo, CA | W 33–12 |
| November 11 | Sacramento | San Luis Obispo, CA | L 0–37 |
| November 18 | at San Jose State | Spartan Field; San Jose, CA | L 0–12 |
*Non-conference game
