= 1927 Idaho Vandals football team =

American college football season

1927 Idaho Vandals football

PCC co-champion
- Conference: Pacific Coast Conference
- Record: 4–1–3 (2–0–2 PCC)
- Head coach: Charles F. Erb (2nd season)
- Home stadium: MacLean Field

1927 Pacific Coast Conference football standings
	Conf.					Overall
Team	W		L		T	W		L		T
Stanford ^ +	4	–	0	–	1	8	–	2	–	1
No. 10 USC +	4	–	0	–	1	8	–	1	–	1
Idaho +	2	–	0	–	2	4	–	1	–	3
Washington	4	–	2	–	0	9	–	2	–	0
Oregon State	2	–	3	–	0	3	–	3	–	1
California	2	–	3	–	0	7	–	3	–	0
Washington State	1	–	3	–	1	3	–	3	–	2
Oregon	0	–	4	–	1	2	–	4	–	1
Montana	0	–	4	–	0	3	–	4	–	1
+ – Conference co-champions; ^ – Selected as Rose Bowl representative; Rankings from Dickinson System

The 1927 Idaho Vandals football team represented the University of Idaho in the 1927 college football season. The Vandals were led by second-year head coach Charles F. Erb and were members of the Pacific Coast Conference. Home games were played on campus in Moscow at MacLean Field.

Idaho compiled a 4–1–3 overall record and went undefeated in their four conference games at 2–0–2. They did not play the three California schools (Stanford, California, and USC) or Washington. (UCLA joined the conference the following year.)

In the Battle of the Palouse with neighbor Washington State, the Vandals tied 7–7 at Rogers Field in Pullman on Friday, November 11. The Cougars broke the Vandals' three-game winning streak (1923–25) in the rivalry game the previous year.

The only loss was to Gonzaga in the finale; the Bulldogs won 13–0 at Gonzaga Stadium in Spokane on November 26.

== Conference co-champions ==
This season is claimed by Idaho as a co-championship with Stanford and USC, and was supported at the time by the Pacific Coast Conference following its December 1927 meetings in Portland. Stanford gained the Rose Bowl berth and defeated Pittsburgh 7–6 on Monday, January 2. The three co-champions were granted possession of the Schwabacher Trophy for four months each.

== Schedule ==
Date	Time	Opponent	Site	Result	Attendance	Source
October 1		Montana State*	MacLean Field; Moscow, ID	W 19–12		
October 8		at Oregon	Hayward Field; Eugene, OR	T 0–0	7,000	
October 15	2:00 pm	Whitman*	MacLean Field; Moscow, ID	W 40–0		
October 22	2:00 pm	Montana	MacLean Field; Moscow, ID (rivalry)	W 42–6		
November 5		vs. Saint Mary's*	Kezar Stadium; San Francisco, CA	T 3–3	5,000	
November 11	2:00 pm	at Washington State	Rogers Field; Pullman, WA (Battle of the Palouse)	T 7–7	15,000	
November 19		at Oregon State	Mutnomah Stadium; Portland, OR	W 12–7	12,000	
November 26	2:00 pm	at Gonzaga*	Gonzaga Stadium; Spokane, WA (rivalry)	L 0–13		
*Non-conference game; All times are in Pacific time
