= 1927 Santa Barbara State Roadrunners football team =

American college football season

1927 Santa Barbara State Roadrunners football
- Conference: California Coast Conference
- Record: 3–5 (2–1 CCC)
- Head coach: Dudley DeGroot (2nd season)
- Home stadium: Peabody Stadium

1927 California Coast Conference football standings
	Conf.					Overall
Team	W		L		T	W		L		T
Sacramento $	6	–	0	–	0	?	–	?	–	?
Chico State	5	–	1	–	0	6	–	2	–	0
Modesto	4	–	2	–	0	5	–	3	–	0
Santa Barbara State	2	–	1	–	0	3	–	5	–	0
San Jose State	3	–	3	–	0	4	–	5	–	0
Cal Poly	1	–	4	–	0	2	–	4	–	1
Bakersfield			–			0	–	3	–	1
San Mateo			–					–
Santa Rosa			–					–
$ – Conference champion

The 1927 Santa Barbara State Roadrunners football team represented Santa Barbara State (Note: University of California, Santa Barbara was known as Santa Barbara State College from 1921 to 1943.) during the 1927 college football season.

Santa Barbara State competed in the California Coast Conference (CCC) in 1927. The Roadrunners were led by second-year head coach Dudley DeGroot and played home games at Peabody Stadium in Santa Barbara, California. They finished the season with a record of three wins and five losses (3–5, 1–2 CCC). Overall, the team was outscored by its opponents 52–167 for the season and was shut out in four of the eight games.

== Schedule ==
Date	Opponent	Site	Result	Source
September 24	UCLA*	Moore Field; Los Angeles, CA	L 0–33	
October 1	Pasadena*	Peabody Stadium; Santa Barbara, CA	W 14–0	
October 8	at Occidental*	D.W. Patterson Field; Los Angeles, CA	L 0–40	
October 15	San Jose State	Peabody Stadium; Santa Barbara, CA	W 13–7	
October 22	San Mateo	Peabody Stadium; Santa Barbara, CA	W 0–26 (forfeit win)	
October 29	at Stanford JV*	Stanford, CA	L 0–12	
November 5	at Cal Poly	San Luis Obispo, CA	L 12–33	
November 12	San Diego State*	Peabody Stadium; Santa Barbara, CA	L 13–16	
*Non-conference game
