= 1927 Fresno State Bulldogs football team =

American college football season

1927 Fresno State Bulldogs football
- Conference: Far Western Conference
- Record: 3–3–2 (2–1–1 FWC)
- Head coach: Arthur W. Jones (7th season)
- Home stadium: Fresno State College Stadium

1927 Far Western Conference football standings
	Conf.					Overall
Team	W		L		T	W		L		T
Saint Mary's $	3	–	0	–	0	7	–	2	–	1
Cal Aggies	2	–	1	–	0	4	–	3	–	1
Fresno State	2	–	1	–	1	3	–	3	–	2
St. Ignatius (CA)	2	–	2	–	1	3	–	5	–	1
Nevada	1	–	3	–	0	2	–	6	–	1
Pacific (CA)	1	–	4	–	0	2	–	6	–	0
$ – Conference champion

The 1927 Fresno State Bulldogs football team represented Fresno State Normal School—now known as California State University, Fresno—during the 1927 college football season.

Fresno State competed in the Far Western Conference (FWC). (Note: The Northern California Athletic Conference (NCAC) was known as the Far Western Conference (FWC) from its founding in 1925 to 1982.) The 1927 team was led by head coach Arthur W. Jones in his seventh year at the helm. They played home games at Fresno State College Stadium (Note: Ratcliffe Stadium was known as Fresno State College Stadium from 1926 to 1940.) on the campus of Fresno City College in Fresno, California. They finished with a record of three wins, three losses and two ties (3–3–2, 2–1–1 FWC). The Bulldogs were outscored by their opponents 45–79 for the season.

== Schedule ==
Date	Opponent	Site	Result	Source
September 24	at Stanford*	Stanford Stadium; Stanford, CA	L 0–33	
October 1	at UCLA*	Moore Field; Los Angeles, CA	L 0–7	
October 15	Nevada	Fresno State College Stadium; Fresno, CA	W 10–7	
October 29	St. Ignatius (CA)	Fresno State College Stadium; Fresno, CA	T 6–6	
November 5	at San Jose State*	Spartan Field; San Jose, CA (rivalry)	W 10–7	
November 11	Cal Aggies	Fresno State College Stadium; Fresno, CA	L 7–13	
November 18	Santa Clara*	Fresno State College Stadium; Fresno, CA	T 6–6	
November 24	Pacific (CA)	Fresno State College Stadium; Fresno, CA	W 6–0	
*Non-conference game
