= Harold Hess =

American football and basketball coach

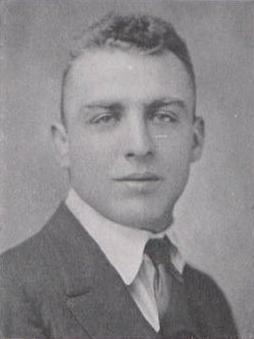
- Hess at Penn State in 1921

Biographical details
- Born: August 18, 1895; Belle Vernon, Pennsylvania, U.S.
- Died: November 9, 1982 (aged 87); Los Angeles, California, U.S.

Playing career

Football
- 1916: Penn State
- 1919–1920: Penn State
- Positions: Fullback, punter, guard

Coaching career (HC unless noted)

Football
- 1922: USC (freshman)
- 1923–1927: Loyola (CA)

Basketball
- 1924–1925: Loyola (CA)

Head coaching record
- Overall: 23–14–4 (football)

William Harold Hess (August 18, 1895 – November 9, 1982) was an American college football and basketball coach. He served as the head coach at Loyola Marymount University from 1923 to 1927.

== Early life ==
A native of Belle Vernon, Pennsylvania near Pittsburgh, Hess attended Belle Vernon High School. Hess went on to college at Pennsylvania State University, where he played on the football team in 1916 and from 1919 to 1920. He played as a fullback and was considered a "star punter" by The Pittsburgh Press. In 1919, during preparation for the rivalry game against Pittsburgh, team captain Bob Higgins had noticed that the Panthers tended to rush ten players when the opposing team elected to punt. He devised a trick play using Hess, the team's punter. Early in the game, Penn State lined up to punt, and when Pittsburgh rushed ten men, Hess lobbed a 25-yard pass to Higgins, who was running free, and he took the ball 92 yards for a touchdown. The play shifted momentum decisively in Penn State's favor, and the Nittany Lions went on to win, 20–0.

For his senior campaign during the 1920 season, Hess was moved from fullback to guard, and his teammates elected him as captain. At Penn State, Hess was a member of Kappa Sigma fraternity and studied agriculture.

== Coaching career ==
In 1922, Hess served as the freshman team coach for USC, whose varsity faced Penn State in that year's Rose Bowl. Because of his knowledge of the opponent, he helped prepare USC for the bowl game, which they won, 14–3.

In 1923, Hess was considered a candidate for the Long Beach State head coaching position. That year, he took over as head coach at Loyola Marymount in Los Angeles, California. There, he introduced the system used at Penn State. In January 1928, he resigned from Loyola, where he compiled a 23–12–4 record.

== Head coaching record ==
=== Football ===
Year	Team	Overall	Conference	Standing	Bowl/playoffs
Loyola Lions (Independent) (1923–1927)
1923	Loyola	4–4			
1924	Loyola	4–3–1			
1925	Loyola	4–2			
1926	Loyola	6–0–2			
1927	Loyola	5–3–1			
Loyola:		23–12–4			
Total:		23–12–4			
