= 1927 San Jose State Spartans football team =

American college football season

1927 San Jose State Spartans football
- Conference: California Coast Conference
- Record: 4–5 (3–3 CCC)
- Head coach: Ernesto R. Knollin (4th season)
- Home stadium: Spartan Field

1927 California Coast Conference football standings
| | Conf. | | | | | Overall |
| Team | W | | L | | T | W | | L | | T |
|---|---|---|---|---|---|---|---|---|---|---|
| Sacramento $ | 6 | – | 0 | – | 0 | ? | – | ? | – | ? |
| Chico State | 5 | – | 1 | – | 0 | 6 | – | 2 | – | 0 |
| Modesto | 4 | – | 2 | – | 0 | 5 | – | 3 | – | 0 |
| Santa Barbara State | 2 | – | 1 | – | 0 | 3 | – | 5 | – | 0 |
| San Jose State | 3 | – | 3 | – | 0 | 4 | – | 5 | – | 0 |
| Cal Poly | 1 | – | 4 | – | 0 | 2 | – | 4 | – | 1 |
| Bakersfield | | | – | | | 0 | – | 3 | – | 1 |
| San Mateo | | | – | | | | | – |
| Santa Rosa | | | – | | | | | – |
$ – Conference champion

The 1927 San Jose State Spartans football team represented State Teachers College at San Jose (Note: San Jose State University was known as State Teachers College at San Jose from 1921 to 1934.) during the 1927 college football season.

San Jose State competed in the California Coast Conference (CCC). The team was led by fourth-year head coach Ernesto R. Knollin, and they played home games at Spartan Field in San Jose, California. The team finished the season with a record of four wins and five losses (4–5, 3–3 CCC). The Spartans outscored their opponents 121–67 for the season.

== Schedule ==
| Date | Opponent | Site | Result | Source |
|---|---|---|---|---|
| October 1 | Bakersfield* | Spartan Field; San Jose, CA | W 44–0 | |
| October 8 | at Sacramento | Sacramento, CA | L 7–13 | |
| October 15 | at Santa Barbara State* | Peabody Stadium; Santa Barbara, CA | L 7–13 | |
| October 22 | Santa Rosa | Spartan Field; San Jose, CA | W 25–0 | |
| October 29 | at San Mateo | San Mateo, CA | W 12–0 | |
| November 5 | at Fresno State* | Fresno State College Stadium; Fresno, CA (rivalry) | L 7–10 | |
| November 11 | at Chico State | University Stadium; Chico, CA | L 0–19 | |
| November 18 | Cal Poly | Spartan Field; San Jose, CA | W 12–0 | |
| November 24 | at Modesto | Modesto, CA | L 7–12 | |
*Non-conference game
