= 1927 Washington Huskies football team =

American college football season

1927 Washington Huskies football
- Conference: Pacific Coast Conference
- Record: 9–2 (4–2 PCC)
- Head coach: Enoch Bagshaw (7th season)
- Captain: Earl Wilson
- Home stadium: University of Washington Stadium

Uniform
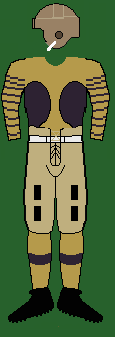

1927 Pacific Coast Conference football standings
	Conf.					Overall
Team	W		L		T	W		L		T
Stanford ^ +	4	–	0	–	1	8	–	2	–	1
No. 10 USC +	4	–	0	–	1	8	–	1	–	1
Idaho +	2	–	0	–	2	4	–	1	–	3
Washington	4	–	2	–	0	9	–	2	–	0
Oregon State	2	–	3	–	0	3	–	3	–	1
California	2	–	3	–	0	7	–	3	–	0
Washington State	1	–	3	–	1	3	–	3	–	2
Oregon	0	–	4	–	1	2	–	4	–	1
Montana	0	–	4	–	0	3	–	4	–	1
+ – Conference co-champions; ^ – Selected as Rose Bowl representative; Rankings from Dickinson System

The 1927 Washington Huskies football team was an American football team that represented the University of Washington during the 1927 college football season. In its seventh season under head coach Enoch Bagshaw, the team compiled a 9–2 record, finished in fourth place in the Pacific Coast Conference, and outscored all opponents by a combined total of 287 to 59. Earl Wilson was the team captain.

== Schedule ==
Date	Opponent	Site	Result	Attendance	Source
October 1	Willamette*	University of Washington Stadium; Seattle, WA	W 32–6	1,758	
October 1	USS Idaho*	University of Washington Stadium; Seattle, WA	W 27–0	1,758	
October 7	USS Idaho*	University of Washington Stadium; Seattle, WA	W 48–0	2,200	
October 8	at Puget Sound*	Tacoma Stadium; Tacoma, WA	W 40–0	1,500	
October 15	at Montana	Dornblaser Field; Missoula, MT	W 32–0	2,500	
October 22	Washington State	University of Washington Stadium; Seattle, WA (rivalry)	W 14–0	35,000	
October 29	Whitman*	University of Washington Stadium; Seattle, WA	W 61–7	4,826	
November 5	Stanford	University of Washington Stadium; Seattle, WA	L 7–13	28,172	
November 12	at California	California Memorial Stadium; Berkeley, CA	W 6–0	40,000	
November 24	Oregon	University of Washington Stadium; Seattle, WA (rivalry)	W 7–0	17,236	
December 3	at USC	Los Angeles Memorial Coliseum; Los Angeles, CA	L 3–33	60,000	
*Non-conference game
