= 1927 St. Ignatius Gray Fog football team =

American football team that represented St. Ignatius College

1927 St. Ignatius Gray Fog football
- Conference: Far Western Conference
- Record: 3–5–1 (2–2–1 FWC)
- Head coach: Jimmy Needles (4th season)
- Home stadium: Kezar Stadium

1927 Far Western Conference football standings
	Conf.					Overall
Team	W		L		T	W		L		T
Saint Mary's $	3	–	0	–	0	7	–	2	–	1
Cal Aggies	2	–	1	–	0	4	–	3	–	1
Fresno State	2	–	1	–	1	3	–	3	–	2
St. Ignatius (CA)	2	–	2	–	1	3	–	5	–	1
Nevada	1	–	3	–	0	2	–	6	–	1
Pacific (CA)	1	–	4	–	0	2	–	6	–	0
$ – Conference champion

The 1927 St. Ignatius Gray Fog football team was an American football team that represented St. Ignatius College (later renamed the University of San Francisco) as a member of the Far Western Conference (FWC) during the 1927 college football season. In its fourth season under head coach Jimmy Needles, the Gray Fog compiled a 3–5–1 record and was outscored by a total of 117 to 83.

== Schedule ==
Date	Opponent	Site	Result	Attendance	Source
September 24	at Nevada	Mackay Field; Reno, NV	W 19–0		
October 2	Olympic Club*	Kezar Stadium; San Francisco, CA	L 0–35	8,000	
October 9	Santa Clara*	Kezar Stadium; San Francisco, CA	L 6–12		
October 16	Saint Mary's	Kezar Stadium; San Francisco, CA	L 0–23		
October 23	West Coast Army*	Kezar Stadium; San Francisco, CA	L 7–12		
October 29	at Fresno State	Fresno State College Stadium; Fresno, CA	T 6–6		
November 5	at Cal Aggies	Davis, CA	W 7–2		
November 11	at Pacific (CA)	College of the Pacific Field; Stockton, CA	L 6–20		
November 24	Loyola (CA)	Kezar Stadium; San Francisco, CA	W 31–7	8,000	
*Non-conference game
