= 1927 Pacific Tigers football team =

American college football season

1927 Pacific Tigers football
- Conference: Far Western Conference
- Record: 2–6 (1–4 FWC)
- Head coach: Erwin Righter (7th season)
- Home stadium: College of the Pacific Field

1927 Far Western Conference football standings
	Conf.					Overall
Team	W		L		T	W		L		T
Saint Mary's $	3	–	0	–	0	7	–	2	–	1
Cal Aggies	2	–	1	–	0	4	–	3	–	1
Fresno State	2	–	1	–	1	3	–	3	–	2
St. Ignatius (CA)	2	–	2	–	1	3	–	5	–	1
Nevada	1	–	3	–	0	2	–	6	–	1
Pacific (CA)	1	–	4	–	0	2	–	6	–	0
$ – Conference champion

The 1927 Pacific Tigers football team represented the College of the Pacific—now known as the University of the Pacific—in Stockton, California as a member of the Far Western Conference (FWC) during the 1927 college football season. The team was led by seventh-year head coach Erwin Righter, and played home games at a field on campus in Stockton. Pacific compiled an overall record of 2–6 with a mark of 1–4 in conference play, placing last out of six teams in the FWC. The Tigers were outscored by their opponents 148 to 61 for the season.

== Schedule ==
Date	Opponent	Site	Result	Source
October 1	at Modesto*	Modesto, CA	W 6–0	
October 8	Olympic Club*	College of the Pacific Field; Stockton, CA	L 6–37	
October 15	Santa Clara*	College of the Pacific Field; Stockton, CA	L 6–36	
October 22	Cal Aggies	College of the Pacific Field; Stockton, CA	L 10–24	
November 5	Nevada^{†}	College of the Pacific Field; Stockton, CA	L 13–19	
November 11	St. Ignatius (CA)	College of the Pacific Field; Stockton, CA	W 20–6	
November 18	at Saint Mary's	Kezar Stadium; San Francisco, CA	L 0–20	
November 24	at Fresno State	Fresno State College Stadium; Fresno, CA	L 0–6	
*Non-conference game; ^{†}Homecoming
