= 1933 Cincinnati Bearcats football team =

American college football season

1933 Cincinnati Bearcats football

BAA co-champion
- Conference: Buckeye Athletic Association
- Record: 7–2 (4–1 BAA)
- Head coach: Dana M. King (3rd season)
- Captain: Merle Williams
- Home stadium: Nippert Stadium

1933 Buckeye Athletic Association football standings
	Conf.					Overall
Team	W		L		T	W		L		T
Cincinnati +	4	–	1	–	0	7	–	2	–	0
Miami (OH) +	4	–	1	–	0	7	–	2	–	0
Ohio	3	–	1	–	1	6	–	2	–	1
Ohio Wesleyan	2	–	3	–	0	6	–	4	–	0
Marshall	1	–	3	–	1	3	–	5	–	1
Wittenberg	0	–	5	–	0	2	–	6	–	0
+ – Conference co-champions

The 1933 Cincinnati Bearcats football team was an American football team that represented the University of Cincinnati as a member of the Buckeye Athletic Association during the 1933 college football season. In their third season under head coach Dana M. King, the Bearcats compiled a 7–2 record (4–1 against conference opponents).

== Schedule ==
Date	Opponent	Site	Result	Attendance	Source
September 30	Rio Grande*	Nippert Stadium; Cincinnati, OH	W 20–0		
October 7	South Dakota*	Nippert Stadium; Cincinnati, OH	W 14–0		
October 14	Kentucky*	Nippert Stadium; Cincinnati, OH	L 0–3		
October 21	Marshall	Carson Field; Cincinnati, OH	W 19–0	11,000	
October 28	Butler*	Nippert Stadium; Cincinnati, OH	W 34–7		
November 4	at Ohio Wesleyan	Delaware, OH	W 7–0		
November 11	at Wittenberg	Springfield, OH	W 14–6		
November 18	Ohio	Nippert Stadium; Cincinnati, OH	W 2–0		
November 30	Miami (OH)	Nippert Stadium; Cincinnati, OH	L 2–6		
*Non-conference game
