= 1927 Chico State Wildcats football team =

American college football season

1927 Chico State Wildcats football

CCC Championship Game, L 0–7 vs. Sacramento Junior College
- Conference: California Coast Conference
- Record: 6–2 (5–1 CCC)
- Head coach: Art Acker (5th season)
- Home stadium: College Field

1927 California Coast Conference football standings
	Conf.					Overall
Team	W		L		T	W		L		T
Sacramento $	6	–	0	–	0	?	–	?	–	?
Chico State	5	–	1	–	0	6	–	2	–	0
Modesto	4	–	2	–	0	5	–	3	–	0
Santa Barbara State	2	–	1	–	0	3	–	5	–	0
San Jose State	3	–	3	–	0	4	–	5	–	0
Cal Poly	1	–	4	–	0	2	–	4	–	1
Bakersfield			–			0	–	3	–	1
San Mateo			–					–
Santa Rosa			–					–
$ – Conference champion

The 1927 Chico State Wildcats football team represented Chico State Teachers College—now known as California State University, Chico—as a member of the California Coast Conference (CCC) during the 1927 college football season. Led by fifth-year head coach Art Acker, Chico State compiled an overall record of 6–2 with a mark of 5–1 in conference play, placing second in the CCC. The Wildcats faced Sacramento Junior College in the CCC championship game, losing 7–0. The team outscored its opponents 164 to 14 for the season. The Wildcats played home games at College Field in Chico, California.

== Schedule ==
Date	Time	Opponent	Site	Result	Source
October 8	3:30 p.m.	at Cal Aggies*	Davis, CA	L 0–7	
October 15		at Cal Poly	San Luis Obispo, CA	W 19–0	
October 22		Modesto	College Field; Chico, CA	W 13–0	
October 29		Santa Rosa	College Field; Chico, CA	W 51–0	
November 5		Oregon Normal*	College Field; Chico, CA	W 55–0	
November 11		San Jose State	College Field; Chico, CA	W 19–0	
November 24		San Mateo	College Field; Chico, CA	W 7–0	
December 3		Sacramento	College Field; Chico, CA (CCC Championship)	L 0–7	
*Non-conference game; All times are in Pacific time
