= 1927 Tempe State Bulldogs football team =

American college football season

1927 Tempe State Bulldogs football
- Conference: Independent
- Record: 2–3–1
- Head coach: Aaron McCreary (5th season)
- Home stadium: Irish Field

1927 Western college football independents records
	Conf.			Overall
Team	W	L	T	W		L		T
New Mexico		–		8	–	0	–	1
Hawaii		–		5	–	2	–	0
Arizona		–		4	–	2	–	1
Regis		–		5	–	3	–	0
Gonzaga		–		5	–	3	–	1
Santa Clara		–		5	–	4	–	2
Loyola (CA)		–		4	–	3	–	1
Tempe State		–		2	–	3	–	1
New Mexico A&M		–		3	–	5	–	1
Humboldt State		–		1	–	2	–	0

The 1927 Tempe State Bulldogs football team was an American football team that represented Tempe State Teachers College (later renamed Arizona State University) as an independent during the 1927 college football season. In their fifth season under head coach Aaron McCreary, the Bulldogs compiled a 2–3–1 record and outscored their opponents by a combined total of 63 to 50. The team's games included a scoreless tie with UTEP and a 25–3 loss to Loyola Marymount. Bill Griffith was the team captain.

== Schedule ==
Date	Opponent	Site	Result	Source
October 8	at Loyola (CA)	Loyola Field; Los Angeles, CA	L 3–25	
October 15	at Phoenix Indian School	Athletic Ground; Phoenix, AZ	L 0–6	
October 22	at Northern Arizona	McMullen Field; Flagstaff, AZ	L 0–19	
November 5	at Gila College	Thatcher, AZ	W 14–0	
November 12	Phoenix College	Irish Field; Tempe, AZ	W 46–0	
November 24	at Texas Mines	El Paso High School Stadium; El Paso, TX	T 0–0	
