= 1927 New Mexico Lobos football team =

American college football season

1927 New Mexico Lobos football
- Conference: Independent
- Record: 8–0–1
- Head coach: Roy W. Johnson (8th season)
- MVP: Malcolm Long
- Captain: Geard "Rusty" Armstrong
- Home stadium: University Field

1927 Western college football independents records
	Conf.			Overall
Team	W	L	T	W		L		T
New Mexico		–		8	–	0	–	1
Hawaii		–		5	–	2	–	0
Arizona		–		4	–	2	–	1
Regis		–		5	–	3	–	0
Gonzaga		–		5	–	3	–	1
Santa Clara		–		5	–	4	–	2
Loyola (CA)		–		4	–	3	–	1
Tempe State		–		2	–	3	–	1
New Mexico A&M		–		3	–	5	–	1
Humboldt State		–		1	–	2	–	0

The 1927 New Mexico Lobos football team season represented the University of New Mexico as an independent during the 1927 college football season. In their eighth season under head coach Roy W. Johnson, the Lobos compiled an 8–0–1 record, shut out five of nine opponents, and outscored all opponents by a total of 215 to 73.

Two New Mexico players were recognized as first-team players on the 1927 All-Southwest football team selected by Bob Ingram of the El Paso Post: Malcolm Long at quarterback and Bob Crist at end. Long was also selected as the team's most valuable player. Halfback Geard "Rusty" Armstrong from Roswell was the team captain.

== Schedule ==
Date	Opponent	Site	Result	Source
October 1	New Mexico Mines	University Field; Albuquerque, NM	W 35–0	
October 8	Montezuma College	University Field; Albuquerque, NM	W 47–0	
October 15	New Mexico Military	University Field; Albuquerque, NM	W 26–0	
October 22	at Texas Mines	El Paso High School Stadium; El Paso, TX	T 6–6	
November 5	Arizona^{†}	Albuquerque, NM (rivalry)	W 7–6	
November 11	Arizona State–Flagstaff	University Field; Albuquerque, NM	W 24–7	
November 18	at New Mexico A&M	Las Cruces, NM (rivalry)	W 26–9	
November 24	Western State (CO)	University Field; Albuquerque, NM	W 32–0	
December 3	at New Mexico Highlands	Las Vegas, NM	W 12–0	
^{†}Homecoming
