= 1927 Saint Mary's Gaels football team =

American college football season

1927 Saint Mary's Gaels football

FWC champion
- Conference: Far Western Conference
- Record: 7–2–1 (3–0 FWC)
- Head coach: Slip Madigan (7th season)
- Home stadium: Kezar Stadium

1927 Far Western Conference football standings
	Conf.					Overall
Team	W		L		T	W		L		T
Saint Mary's $	3	–	0	–	0	7	–	2	–	1
Cal Aggies	2	–	1	–	0	4	–	3	–	1
Fresno State	2	–	1	–	1	3	–	3	–	2
St. Ignatius (CA)	2	–	2	–	1	3	–	5	–	1
Nevada	1	–	3	–	0	2	–	6	–	1
Pacific (CA)	1	–	4	–	0	2	–	6	–	0
$ – Conference champion

The 1927 Saint Mary's Gaels football team was an American football team that represented Saint Mary's College of California during the 1927 college football season. In their seventh season under head coach Slip Madigan, the Gaels compiled a 7–2–1 record, shut out seven opponents, won the Far Western Conference championship, and outscored all opponents by a combined total of 155 to 28. The Gaels' victories including a 16-0 besting of Stanford. The Gaels also lost to California, 13–0.

Center Larry Bettencourt was selected by the Associated Press as a first-team member of the 1927 All-Pacific Coast football team; he was later inducted into the College Football Hall of Fame.

== Schedule ==
Date	Opponent	Site	Result	Attendance	Source
September 25	Army, Ninth Corps Area*	Kezar Stadium; San Francisco, CA	W 21–0	14,000	
October 1	at Stanford*	Stanford Stadium; Stanford, CA	W 16–0	38,000	
October 8	at California*	California Memorial Stadium; Berkeley, CA	L 0–13	> 70,000	
October 16	St. Ignatius (CA)	Kezar Stadium; San Francisco, CA	W 23–0		
October 22	Nevada	Kezar Stadium; San Francisco, CA	W 38–0		
October 29	Gonzaga*	Kezar Stadium; San Francisco, CA	W 12–0	500	
November 5	at Idaho*	Kezar Stadium; San Francisco, CA	T 3–3	6,000	
November 13	Olympic Club*	Kezar Stadium; San Francisco, CA	L 0–12		
November 18	Pacific (CA)	Kezar Stadium; San Francisco, CA	W 20–0		
November 26	Santa Clara*	Kezar Stadium; San Francisco, CA	W 22–0	14,000	
*Non-conference game
