= Dudley DeGroot =

American athlete and coach (1899–1970)

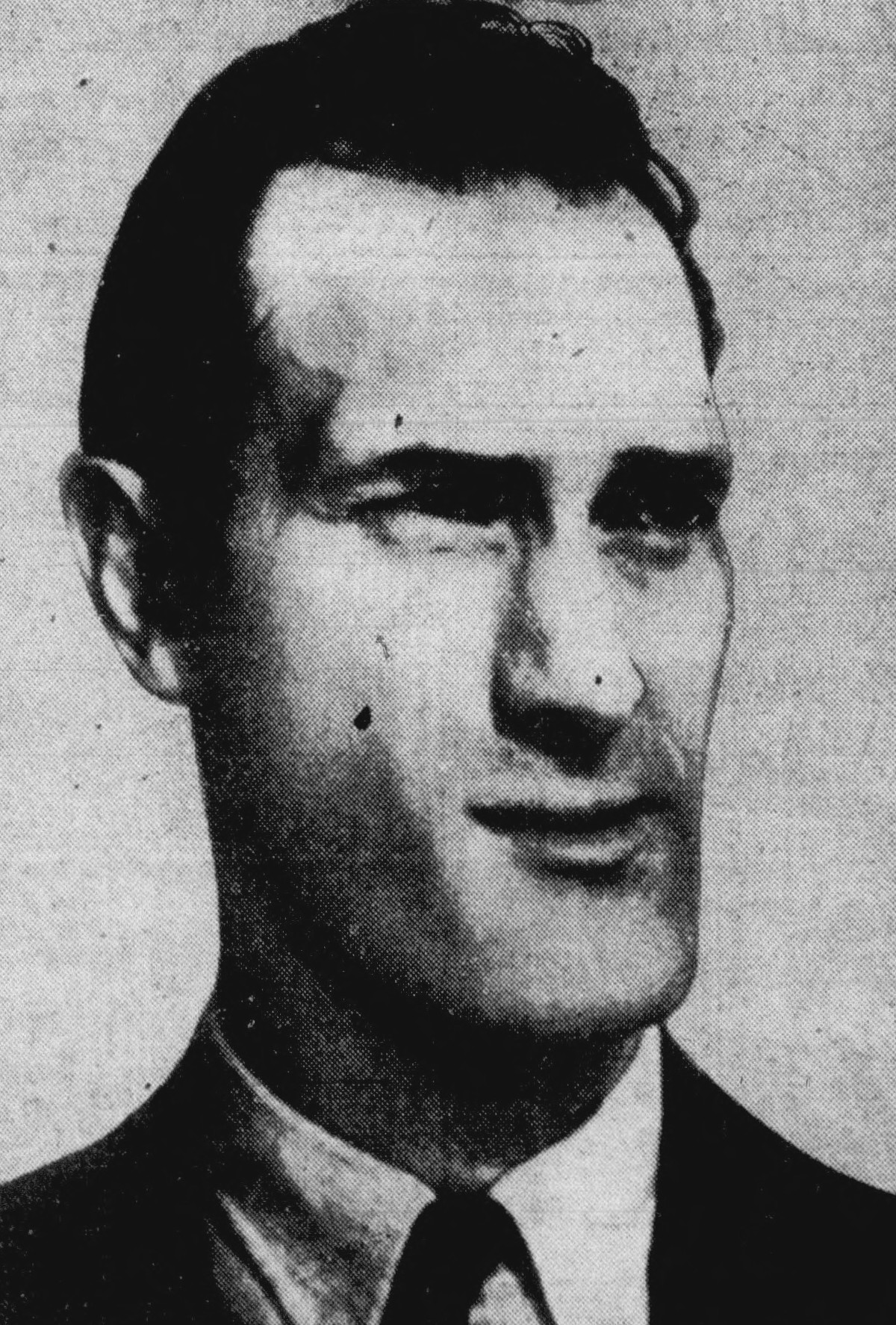
- DeGroot, c. 1946

Biographical details
- Born: November 10, 1899; Chicago, Illinois, U.S.
- Died: May 5, 1970 (aged 70); El Cajon, California, U.S.

Playing career

Football
- 1920–1922: Stanford

Basketball
- 1921–1922: Stanford
- Position: Center

Coaching career (HC unless noted)

Football
- 1926–1927: Santa Barbara State
- 1928–1931: Menlo
- 1932–1939: San Jose State
- 1940–1943: Rochester (NY)
- 1944–1945: Washington Redskins
- 1946–1947: Los Angeles Dons
- 1948–1949: West Virginia
- 1950–1952: New Mexico

Basketball
- 1927–1928: Santa Barbara State
- 1928–1932: Menlo

Baseball
- 1928: Santa Barbara State

Track & field
- 1927–1928: Santa Barbara State

Administrative career (AD unless noted)
- 1926–1928: Santa Barbara State
- 1928–1932: Menlo

Head coaching record
- Overall: 113–62–9 (college football); 26–16–3 (NFL/AAFC); 6–13 (college basketball); 2–4 (college baseball)
- Bowls: 1–0

Accomplishments and honors

Championships
- Football; 2 Far Western (1932, 1934); 1 CCAA (1939)

Awards
- All-American athlete, 1922; First-team All-PCC (1922)
Medal record
Men's rugby union
Representing the United States
Olympic Games
Gold medal – first place	1924 Paris	Rugby

Dudley Sargent DeGroot (November 10, 1899 – May 5, 1970) was an American athlete and coach, primarily of American football. He served as the head coach for the Washington Redskins of the National Football League (NFL) from 1944 and 1945, tallying a mark of 14–5–1; his winning percentage of .737 is the best in franchise history for coaches with at least one full season. DeGroot was also the head football coach at Santa Barbara State College—now the University of California, Santa Barbara—from 1926 to 1927, San Jose State University (1932–1939), the University of Rochester (1940–1943), West Virginia University (1948–1949), and the University of New Mexico (1950–1952), compiling a career college football head coaching record of 117–67–9. In addition, he served as the head coach of the Los Angeles Dons of the All-America Football Conference (AAFC) from 1946 to 1947.

== Early life and playing career ==
DeGroot attended Sequoia High School in Redwood City, California. At Stanford University he competed in basketball, football, swimming, and water polo. Playing under the head coach, Pop Warner, he became the Stanford Cardinal football team captain in 1922 and their first All-American athlete. In both 1923 and 1924, DeGroot was the Intercollegiate Association of Amateur Athletes of America, 4A, ICAAAA, or IC4A, backstroke champion.

DeGroot was a member of the United States rugby team that won an Olympic gold medal during the 1924 competition in Paris. A journal by DeGroot about the activities of this Olympic rugby team was published throughout 23 days during July 1924 by the newspaper, The Call.

== Coaching career ==
In 1928, DeGroot was hired as the physical director at Menlo Junior College—now known as Menlo College in Atherton, California. He coached football and basketball at Menlo for four seasons. In 1932, he left Menlo to become head football coach at San Jose State Teachers College—now known as San Jose State University. Russell Sweet succeeded him as Menlo's head football coach.

From 1932 through 1939, DeGroot led the San Jose State Spartans football team a 60–19–8 record. His best season there came in 1939, when his team went undefeated and had outscored opponents 324 to 29. As of 2006 on a list published on Mercury News of the seven biggest turnarounds for a single season in the history of the Spartans, only DeGroot is listed twice, for 1932 and 1937. The statistics for these are: the record for the 1932 season is 7–0–2 with a previous season of 1–7 and a margin of six and, the record for the 1937 season is 11–2–1 with a previous season of 5–4 and another margin of six.

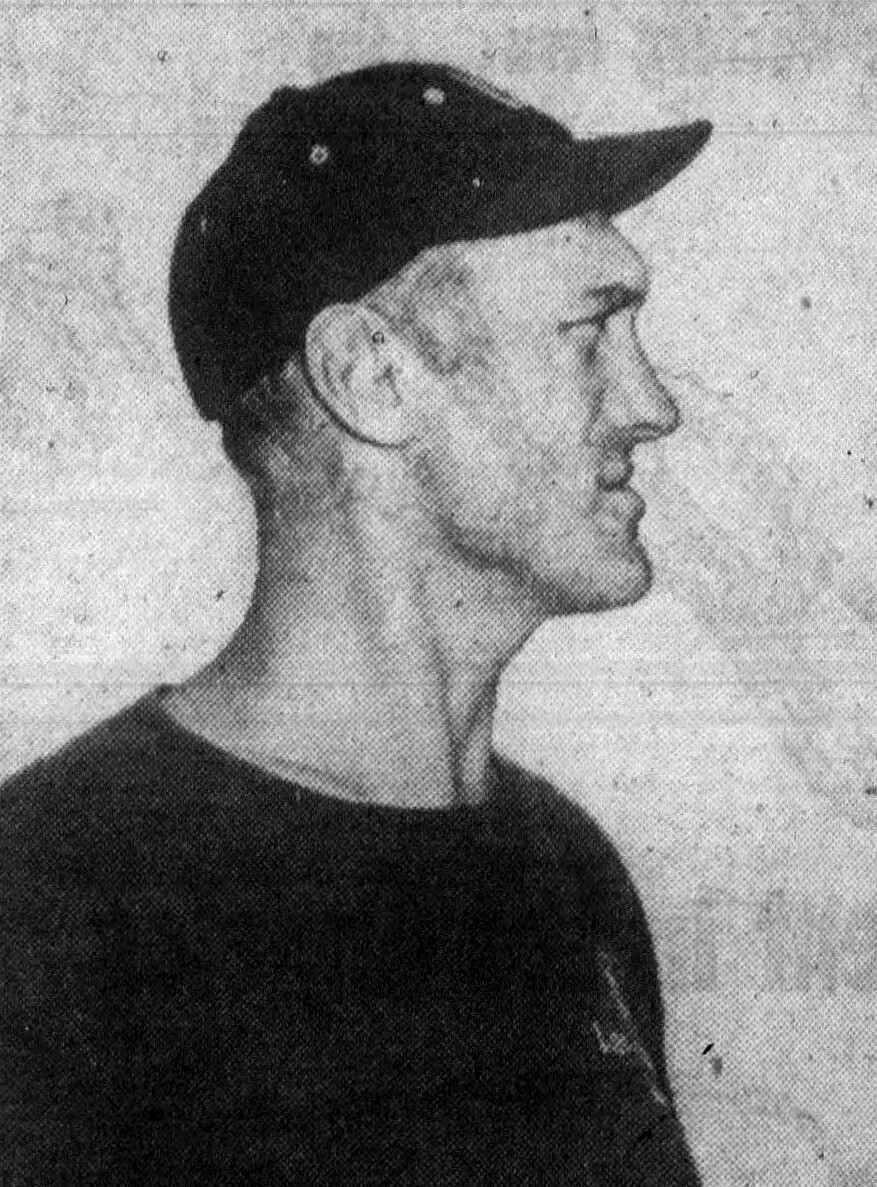
DeGroot, circa 1947

His next team leadership was at the University of Rochester, where he was football coach from 1940 through 1943. DeGroot's record there was 24–6.

Moving to professional sports, he then took over the Washington Redskins, a National Football League (NFL) team, in Washington, D.C. Although they lost the NFL championship for that year by one point, 15–14, to the Cleveland Rams, the Redskins won the Eastern Division title in 1945 with DeGroot as their coach. During two seasons with the Los Angeles Dons of the new All-America Football Conference, DeGroot's record was 14–12–2.

DeGroot returned to collegiate coaching as the head football coach at West Virginia University during 1948 through 1949. His record for the West Virginia Mountaineers was 13–9–1. At the University of New Mexico from 1950 through 1952, DeGroot's record was 13–17 for the Lobos.

== Scientific recognition ==
DeGroot received his doctorate degree in education and was recognized as one of the foremost oologists and ornithologists in the United States. His work in oology continues to be discussed in scientific publications.

== Personal and family information ==
Notable members of his immediate family include his son, Dudley E. DeGroot, who obtained his doctorate degree in anthropology, and one of his daughters, Alice A. DeGroot, who became a large animal veterinarian holding patents for her inventions.

== Death ==
DeGroot died at the age of 70 on May 5, 1970, at his home in El Cajon, California.

== Head coaching record ==
=== College football ===
Year	Team	Overall	Conference	Standing	Bowl/playoffs
Santa Barbara State Roadrunners (Independent) (1926)
1926	Santa Barbara State	2–4			
Santa Barbara State Roadrunners (California Coast Conference) (1927–1928)
1927	Santa Barbara State	2–7	2–1		
Santa Barbara State:		4–11	2–1		
San Jose State Spartans (Far Western Conference) (1932–1934)
1932	San Jose State	7–0–2	3–0–2	T–1st	
1933	San Jose State	5–4	3–1	2nd	
1934	San Jose State	3–3–4	2–0–3	T–1st	
San Jose State Spartans (Independent) (1935–1938)
1935	San Jose State	5–5–1			
1936	San Jose State	5–4			
1937	San Jose State	11–2–1			
1938	San Jose State	11–1			
San Jose State Spartans (California Collegiate Athletic Association) (1939)
1939	San Jose State	13–0	3–0	1st	
San Jose State:		60–19–8	11–1–5		
Rochester Yellowjackets (Independent) (1940–1943)
1940	Rochester	4–3			
1941	Rochester	6–1			
1942	Rochester	7–1			
1943	Rochester	6–1			
Rochester:		23–6			
West Virginia Mountaineers (Independent) (1948–1949)
1948	West Virginia	9–3			W Sun
1949	West Virginia	4–6–1			
West Virginia:		13–9–1			
New Mexico Lobos (Border Conference) (1950)
1950	New Mexico	2–8	2–5	7th	
New Mexico Lobos (Skyline Conference) (1952)
1951	New Mexico	4–7	2–4	7th	
1952	New Mexico	7–2	5–1	2nd	
New Mexico:		13–17	9–10		
Total:		113–62–9			
National championship Conference title Conference division title or championship game berth

== See also ==
- List of Olympic medalists in rugby union
