= 1933 Miami Redskins football team =

American college football season

1933 Miami Redskins football

BAA co-champion
- Conference: Buckeye Athletic Association
- Record: 7–2 (4–1 BAA)
- Head coach: Frank Wilton (2nd season)
- Home stadium: Miami Field

1933 Buckeye Athletic Association football standings
	Conf.					Overall
Team	W		L		T	W		L		T
Cincinnati +	4	–	1	–	0	7	–	2	–	0
Miami (OH) +	4	–	1	–	0	7	–	2	–	0
Ohio	3	–	1	–	1	6	–	2	–	1
Ohio Wesleyan	2	–	3	–	0	6	–	4	–	0
Marshall	1	–	3	–	1	3	–	5	–	1
Wittenberg	0	–	5	–	0	2	–	6	–	0
+ – Conference co-champions

The 1933 Miami Redskins football team was an American football team that represented Miami University of Oxford, Ohio, as a member of the Buckeye Athletic Association (BAA) during the 1933 college football season. In their second season under head coach Frank Wilton, the Redskins compiled a 7–2 record (4–1 in conference games), tied for the BAA championship, shut out four opponents, and outscored all opponents by a total of 223 to 36.

Fullback Leonard Fertig starred on offense for the team.

== Schedule ==
Date	Opponent	Site	Result	Source
September 30	at Indiana*	Memorial Stadium; Bloomington, IN10,000	L 0–7	
October 7	Hanover*	Miami Field; Oxford, OH	W 14–0	
October 14	Marshall	Miami Field; Oxford, OH	W 42–14	
October 21	at Ohio	Ohio Field; Athens, OH (rivalry)	L 0–6	
October 28	Wittenberg	Miami Field; Oxford, OH	W 44–7	
November 4	Georgetown (KY)*	Miami Field; Oxford, OH	W 51–0	
November 11	at Ohio Wesleyan	Delaware, OH	W 24–0	
November 18	Heidelberg*	Miami Field; Oxford, OH	W 42–0	
November 30	at Cincinnati	Nippert Stadium; Cincinnati, OH (Victory Bell)	W 6–2	
*Non-conference game
