= Louis Macouillard =

American artist (1913–1987)

- Born: September 8, 1913; San Francisco, California
- Died: November 26, 1987 (aged 74); San Francisco, California
- Education: California Guild of Arts and Crafts (CCAC), Art Students League of New York
- Years active: 1940s–1970s
- Spouse: Grace Harrison Macouillard (1943–until death)

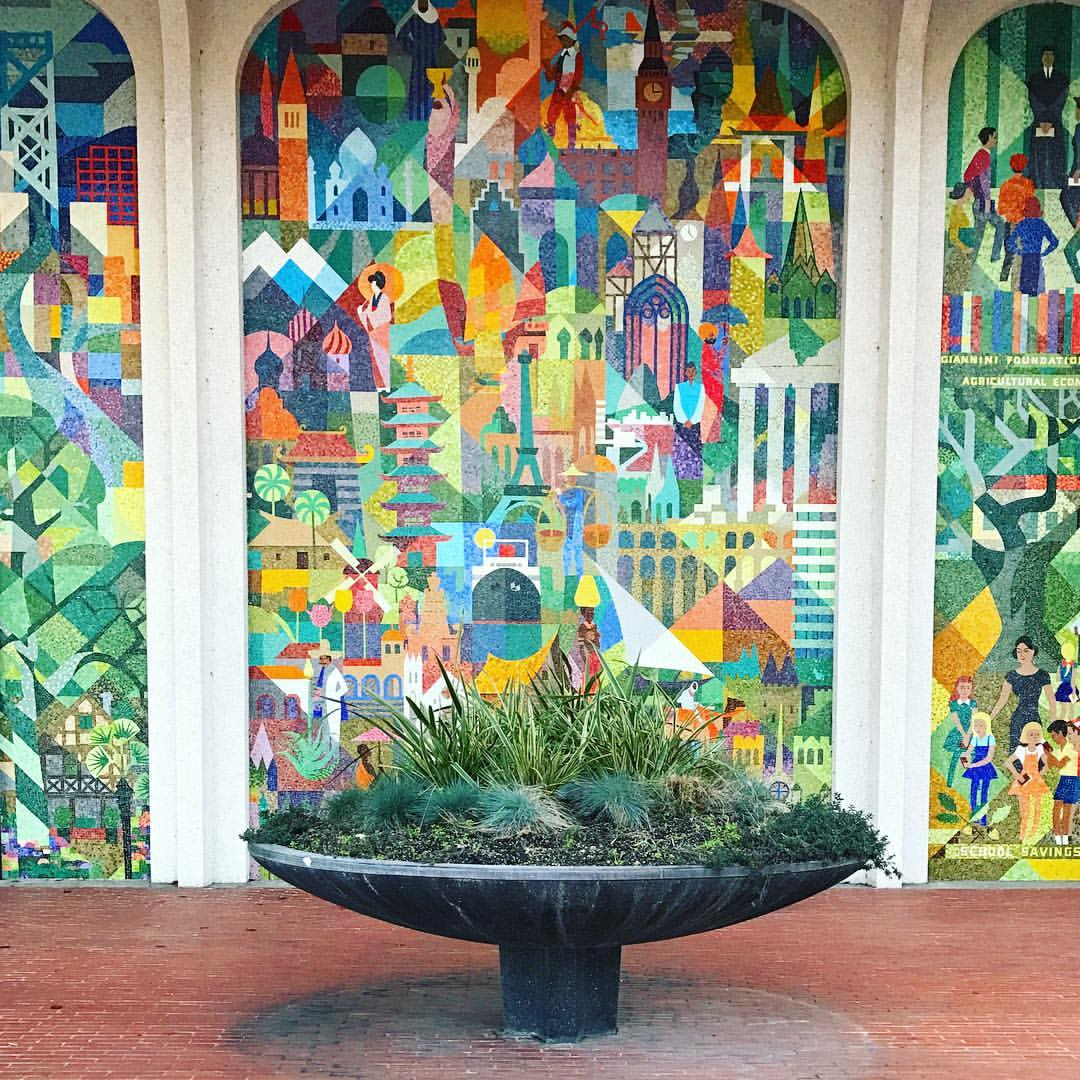
Macouillard designed mosaic mural located in San Mateo, California

Louis Macouillard (September 8, 1913 – November 26, 1987) was an American artist known for his watercolor paintings of travel and marine genres, as well as his work as a commercial illustrator.

== Biography ==
Louis Macouillard was born on September 8, 1913, in San Francisco, California. He graduated from San Francisco Polytechnic High School and the California College of Arts and Crafts (CCAC) in 1934. After graduation, he continued his studies in New York City at the Art Students League of New York (ASL). Later on, he returned to San Francisco to work at the Velvetone Poster Company, as an art director.

He served in the US Navy in the South Pacific during World War II. While serving in the Navy he produced many artworks showcasing his travels, which he mailed to his fiancée, and which were then featured in a six-page spread and cover of the October 1943 issue of Life (magazine).

Macouillard designed two postage stamps, one of them being the commemorative 6¢ US postage stamp of Daniel Boone issued in September 1968.

In 1963 Macouillard designed a mosaic mural that adorns a mid-century modern bank at 300 S. El Camino Real, San Mateo, California. The mural was constructed by Alfonso Pardiñas of Byzantine Mosaics. It tells the story of A. P. Giannini, the founder of Bank of Italy, and features bold, bright colored and features childlike illustrations in five panels, 25-foot-high.

His work is featured in the permanent collection at Fine Arts Museums of San Francisco (FAMSF), and the Smithsonian American Art Museum. One of his etchings is featured in a scrapbook collage by artist Xavier Martinez and is part of the permanent collection at the Oakland Museum of California.

== Personal ==
Macouillard married Grace Macouillard (née Harrison) in July 1943. He was a skilled yachtsman and hand-crafted one of the first trimarans which he sailed on San Francisco Bay. Towards the end of his life, his time was divided between his homes in San Francisco and in Glen Ellen in Sonoma County. Macouillard died in San Francisco on November 26, 1987.

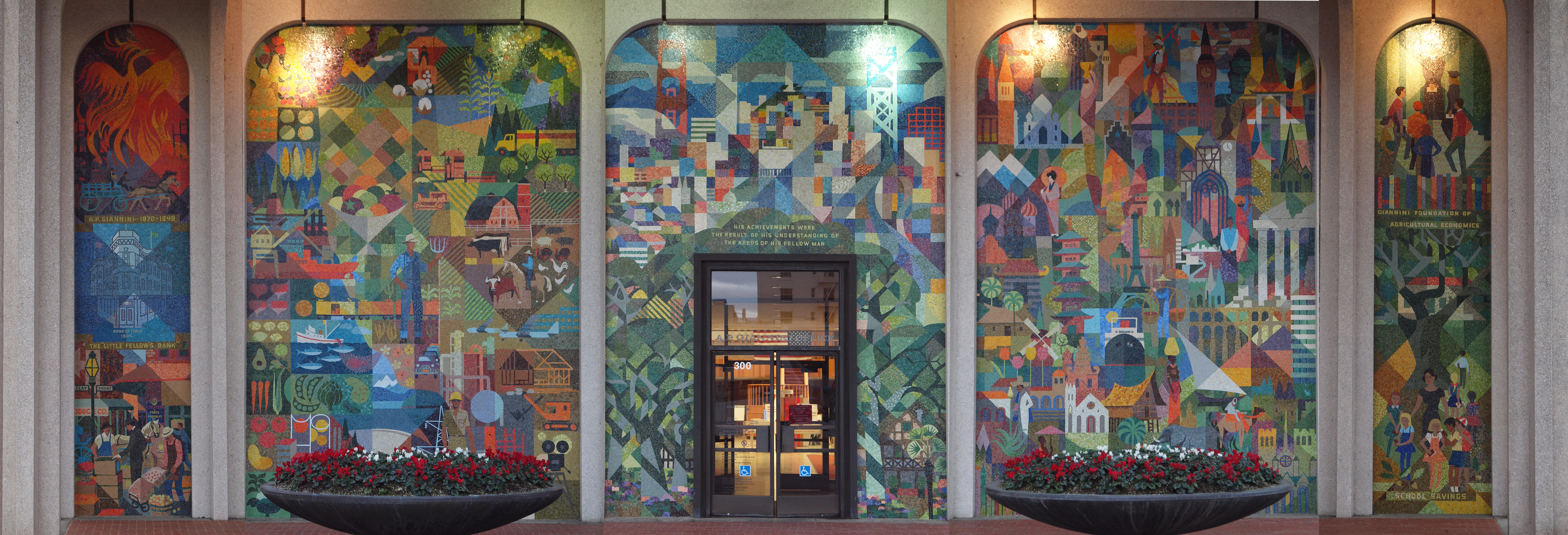
