= The Giannini Foundation of Agricultural Economics =

Logo of The Giannini Foundation of Agricultural Economics

The Giannini Foundation of Agricultural Economics was founded in the 1920s from a $1.5 million gift to the University of California from the Bancitaly Corporation in honor of its founder, A.P. Giannini. This fund has now grown to $20 million that is used to promote and support research on the economics of California agriculture. Members, which include faculty from various University of California campuses, may apply for grants to conduct research on California's agricultural economy and development. The findings are often reported in numerous publications.

== Origin of the Foundation ==
Amadeo Peter Giannini, or A.P. as he was known, established the Bank of Italy in 1904 in the North Beach district of San Francisco. He initially made his money as a commission merchant and produce dealer for farms in the Santa Clara Valley, but found banks uninterested in being in business with farms, so he decided to open his own bank. The business continued to grow and more branches were opened in the Central Valley. Giannini sought out customers in agriculture, with a focus on expanding the horticulture industry and small farmers. The bank became extremely profitable in the 1920s prior to the Great Depression.

While President of the Bancitaly Corporation, Giannini never received a salary or other compensation. In 1926, Bancitaly's directors voted to reimburse Giannini with 5% of the corporation's annual net profits, a figure of $1.5 million. However, he refused to accept the money and asked that it be donated to help California's farmers. Thus, on February 14, 1928, the Bancitaly Corporation presented a gift of $1.5 million to the Regents of the University of California. The board of directors decided that the fund be used strictly in the broad field of agricultural economics.

== The Activities of the Foundation ==
Members of the foundation include faculty and Cooperative Extension specialists in agricultural and resource economics at UC Berkeley, UC Davis, and UC Riverside. The Foundation focuses on research in the realm of agriculture and rural development in California. Members and associate members of the Foundation may apply competitively to receive funding for their research.

== Publications ==
Foundation members and graduate students publish widely on topics relevant to California agriculture. Though much of this research appears in leading peer-reviewed journals, the Foundation has its own publication series:

- ARE Update- Agricultural and Resource Economics Update, this bimonthly newsletter is published to print topical papers written by members of the Foundation.
- Giannini Reporter- Provides information on the ongoing research of the Foundation, the extension of that research, and other related activities.
- Research Report Series- Designed to communicate research results to specific professional audiences interested in applications.
- Monograph Series- Provides an outlet for reports of research appraised by criteria equivalent to those of leading technical journals in agricultural economics.
- Information Series- Communicates selected research to a lay audience.
- Special Report Series- An outlet for papers worthy of publication, yet not belonging in a regular series.

In honor of the 75th anniversary of A.P.'s gift to the University of California, two emeritus members, Warren Johnston and Alex McCalla, published a book entitled "A.P. Giannini and the Giannini Foundation of Agricultural Economics," which includes paper and panel discussion of the 75th Symposium, annals of the Giannini Foundation, and archival materials of California's agricultural economics.

== Libraries ==
The Giannini Foundation supports the agricultural and resource economics libraries that are found on the Davis and Berkeley campuses. Open to the public, the libraries contain considerable amounts of literature in the field of agricultural economics to support the research of foundation members, graduate students, and other researchers.

== See also ==
- Giannini Hall
