= 1927 Cal Aggies football team =

American college football season

1927 Cal Aggies football
- Conference: Far Western Conference
- Record: 4–3–1 (2–1 FWC)
- Head coach: William L. Driver (5th season)
- Captain: Ben Robinson
- Home stadium: Moreing Field

1927 Far Western Conference football standings
	Conf.					Overall
Team	W		L		T	W		L		T
Saint Mary's $	3	–	0	–	0	7	–	2	–	1
Cal Aggies	2	–	1	–	0	4	–	3	–	1
Fresno State	2	–	1	–	1	3	–	3	–	2
St. Ignatius (CA)	2	–	2	–	1	3	–	5	–	1
Nevada	1	–	3	–	0	2	–	6	–	1
Pacific (CA)	1	–	4	–	0	2	–	6	–	0
$ – Conference champion

The 1927 Cal Aggies football team represented the Northern Branch of the College of Agriculture—now known as the University of California, Davis—as a member of the Far Western Conference (FWC) during the 1927 college football season. The team was known as the Cal Aggies, California Aggies, and sometimes the Cal Aggies Mustangs. Led by William L. Driver in his fifth and final season as head coach, the Cal Aggies compiled an overall record of 4–3–1 with a mark of 2–1 in conference play, tying for second place in the FWC. The team outscored its opponents 84 to 82 for the season with three of their victories coming via shutout. The Cal Aggies played one home game at Moreing Field in Sacramento, California and three home games in Davis, California

In five years under Driver, the Aggies compiled a record of 18–23–3, for a winning percentage of .443.

== Schedule ==
Date	Time	Opponent	Site	Result	Attendance	Source
September 24		Arbuckle American Legion*	Davis, CA	W 32–0		
October 1		at Oregon State*	Bell Field; Corvallis, OR	L 6–25		
October 8	3:30 p.m.	Chico State*	Davis, CA	W 7–0		
October 15	2:00 p.m.	BYU*	Moreing Field; Sacramento, CA	T 0–0		
October 22		at Pacific (CA)	C.O.P. Field; Stockton, CA	W 24–10		
October 29		Olympic Club*	Kezar Stadium; San Francisco, CA	L 0–33	423	
November 5		St. Ignatius (CA)^{†}	Davis, CA	L 2–7		
November 11		at Fresno State	Fresno State College Stadium; Fresno, CA	W 13–7		
*Non-conference game; ^{†}Homecoming; All times are in Pacific time
