= 1927 Nevada Wolf Pack football team =

American college football season

1927 Nevada Wolf Pack football
- Conference: Far Western Conference
- Record: 2–6–1 (1–3 FWC)
- Head coach: Buck Shaw (3rd season)
- Home stadium: Mackay Field

1927 Far Western Conference football standings
	Conf.					Overall
Team	W		L		T	W		L		T
Saint Mary's $	3	–	0	–	0	7	–	2	–	1
Cal Aggies	2	–	1	–	0	4	–	3	–	1
Fresno State	2	–	1	–	1	3	–	3	–	2
St. Ignatius (CA)	2	–	2	–	1	3	–	5	–	1
Nevada	1	–	3	–	0	2	–	6	–	1
Pacific (CA)	1	–	4	–	0	2	–	6	–	0
$ – Conference champion

The 1927 Nevada Wolf Pack football team was an American football team that represented the University of Nevada in the Far Western Conference (FWC) during the 1927 college football season. In their third season under head coach Buck Shaw, the team compiled a 2–6–1 record (1–3 FWC) and finished fifth in the conference.

== Schedule ==
Date	Opponent	Site	Result	Source
September 26	St. Ignatius (CA)	Mackay Field; Reno, NV	L 0–19	
October 1	at California*	California Memorial Stadium; Berkeley, CA	L 0–54	
October 8	at Stanford*	Stanford Stadium; Stanford, CA	L 2–20	
October 15	at Fresno State	Fresno State College Stadium; Fresno, CA	L 7–10	
October 22	at Saint Mary's	Kezar Stadium; San Francisco, CA	L 0–38	
October 30	Santa Clara*	Mackay Field; Reno, NV	T 7–7	
November 5	Pacific (CA)	Mackay Field; Reno, NV	W 19–13	
November 11	Young Men's Institute (San Francisco)*	Mackay Field; Reno, NV	W 13–7	
November 19	at Gonzaga*	Gonzaga Stadium; Spokane, WA	L 6–41	
*Non-conference game
