= Frank Wilton =

Biographical details
- Born: August 17, 1905; Chicago, Illinois, U.S.
- Died: December 17, 1977 (aged 72); Solvang, California, U.S.

Playing career

Football
- 1926–1928: Stanford
- Position: Halfback

Coaching career (HC unless noted)

Football
- c. 1930: Burlingame HS (CA)
- 1931: Stanford (assistant)
- 1932–1941: Miami (OH)

Baseball
- 1933–1942: Miami (OH)

Head coaching record
- Overall: 44–39–5 (college football); 74–47 (college baseball)

Accomplishments and honors

Championships
- 3 Buckeye (1932–1933, 1936)

Frank S. Wilton Jr. (August 17, 1905 – December 17, 1977) was an American football player and coach of football and baseball. He served as the head football coach for Miami University in Oxford, Ohio from 1932 to 1941, compiling a record of 44–39–5. Wilton was also the head baseball coach at Miami from 1933 to 1942, tallying a mark of 74–47.

== Playing career ==
Wilton lettered three seasons (1926–1928) in football for Pop Warner at Stanford University. In his three years the Stanford football team went a combined 26–5–3 with two trips to the Rose Bowl. In 1927 against USC he caught a 74-yard touchdown pass from Biff Hoffman, which was at the time the longest in Stanford history.

== Coaching career ==
Wilton came to Miami University from Stanford and installed Pop Warner's double wingback offensive system. In his first two years, 1932 and 1933, he led the Redskins to Buckeye Intercollegiate Athletic Association championships. In those two years he only lost three games, two to Big Ten Conference teams Indiana and Illinois. The next two years his teams won only five games each year, but returned to championship form in 1936 with a 7–2 record and a share of the conference title. The Redskins slid to a 4–4–1 record in 1937, but rebounded in 1938 with a 6–3 record. The last three years of Wilton's tenure saw a drastic downturn in victories. The 1939, 1940, and 1941 seasons produced a total of three wins. After the 1941 season he was replaced by Stu Holcomb. Shortly after the Japanese attack on Pearl Harbor, Wilton resigned his duties at Miami, effective at the end of the school year, to join the United States Navy. He left Miami with the most football wins in school history, a record he retained until Randy Walker surpsed him in 1997. Wilton's 44 wins remain third in Miami football history, more than those tallied by Hall of Fame coaches George Little, Sid Gillman, Woody Hayes, Ara Parseghian, and Bo Schembechler.

== Military service and later life ==
Wilton was commissioned as a Lieutenant in United States Navy Reserve. During World War II, he was based at NRAB/NAS Millington, a pre-flight cadet training base in Memphis, Tennessee As a Lieutenant Commander with ComAir 7th Fleet in the Pacific theater, he ran athletic programs for aviators' R&R. After the war, Wilton ran athletic programs at NAS Saint Mary's College of California. When he left the Navy, he became a training coordinator with the Kimberly-Clark Corporation in Neenah, Wisconsin. In his early years there, he coached the company football team for two seasons.

After 20 years at Kimberly-Clark and six years of working and traveling in Central America and South America, Wilton moved to Hanford, California. He died on December 17, 1977, in Solvang, California.

== Head coaching record ==
=== Football ===
Year	Team	Overall	Conference	Standing	Bowl/playoffs
Miami Redskins (Buckeye Athletic Association) (1932–1938)
1932	Miami	7–1	5–0	1st	
1933	Miami	7–2	4–1	T–1st	
1934	Miami	5–4	2–2	3rd	
1935	Miami	5–3–1	1–3–1	5th	
1936	Miami	7–1–1	3–1–1	T–1st	
1937	Miami	4–4–1	2–3	4th	
1938	Miami	6–3	1–3	T–4th	
Miami Redskins (Independent) (1939–1941)
1939	Miami	1–7–1			
1940	Miami	0–7–1			
1941	Miami	2–7			
Miami:		44–39–5	18–13–2		
Total:		44–39–5			
National championship Conference title Conference division title or championship game berth
