= 1927 Gonzaga Bulldogs football team =

American college football season

1927 Gonzaga Bulldogs football
- Conference: Independent
- Record: 5–3–1
- Head coach: Clipper Smith (3rd season)
- Home stadium: Gonzaga Stadium

1927 Western college football independents records
	Conf.			Overall
Team	W	L	T	W		L		T
New Mexico		–		8	–	0	–	1
Hawaii		–		5	–	2	–	0
Arizona		–		4	–	2	–	1
Regis		–		5	–	3	–	0
Gonzaga		–		5	–	3	–	1
Santa Clara		–		5	–	4	–	2
Loyola (CA)		–		4	–	3	–	1
Tempe State		–		2	–	3	–	1
New Mexico A&M		–		3	–	5	–	1
Humboldt State		–		1	–	2	–	0

The 1927 Gonzaga Bulldogs football team was an American football team that represented Gonzaga University during the 1927 college football season. In their third year under head coach Clipper Smith, the Bulldogs compiled a 5–3–1 record and outscored all opponents by a total of 154 to 59.

The team was led by quarterback Fanny Hunting. He ran 97 yards for a touchdown against Nevada. The team captain was Fred Baier. Baier's mother died in the grandstand at the start of Gonzaga's game against Washington State. Baier did not learn of his mother's death until he was taken out of the game in the fourth quarter due to an injury.

== Schedule ==
Date	Opponent	Site	Result	Attendance	Source
October 1	Cheney Normal	Gonzaga Stadium; Spokane, WA	W 74–0		
October 8	at Whitman	Walla Walla, WA	W 7–0		
October 15	Washington State	Gonzaga Stadium; Spokane, WA	L 0–13		
October 22	at Mount St. Charles	Butte, MT	L 0–21		
October 29	at Saint Mary's	Kezar Stadium; San Francisco, CA	L 0–12	500	
November 4	at Loyola (CA)	Los Angeles, CA	W 19–7		
November 12	Montana	Gonzaga Stadium; Spokane, WA	T 0–0		
November 19	Nevada	Gonzaga Stadium; Spokane, WA	W 41–6		
November 26	Idaho	Gonzaga Stadium; Spokane, WA	W 13–0		
