= 1927 Regis Rangers football team =

American college football season

1927 Regis Rangers football
- Conference: Independent
- Record: 5–3
- Head coach: Tom McNamara

1927 Western college football independents records
	Conf.			Overall
Team	W	L	T	W		L		T
New Mexico		–		8	–	0	–	1
Hawaii		–		5	–	2	–	0
Arizona		–		4	–	2	–	1
Regis		–		5	–	3	–	0
Gonzaga		–		5	–	3	–	1
Santa Clara		–		5	–	4	–	2
Loyola (CA)		–		4	–	3	–	1
Tempe State		–		2	–	3	–	1
New Mexico A&M		–		3	–	5	–	1
Humboldt State		–		1	–	2	–	0

The 1927 Regis Rangers football team was an American football team that represented Regis College as an independent during the 1927 college football season. The team compiled a 5–3 record and outscored opponents by a total of 101 to 54. Tom McNamara was the head football coach and supervisor of all athletics.

== Schedule ==
Date	Opponent	Site	Result	Attendance	Source
September 24	at Nebraska Wesleyan	Lincoln, NE	W 20–0		
October 1	Washburn	Denver, CO	W 21–0		
October 15	Bethany (KS)	Denver, CO	L 6–13		
October 29	Haskell	Denver, CO	L 6–7		
November 5	Columbia (IA)	Denver, CO	W 7–6		
November 12	at Loyola (CA)	Los Angeles, CA	W 20–18		
November 19	South Dakota State	Denver, CO	L 7–10		
November 24	Des Moines	Denver, CO	W 14–0		
