= 1927 Loyola Lions football team =

American college football season

1927 Loyola Lions football
- Conference: Independent
- Record: 4–3–1
- Head coach: Harold Hess (5th season)
- Home stadium: Loyola Field

1927 Western college football independents records
	Conf.			Overall
Team	W	L	T	W		L		T
New Mexico		–		8	–	0	–	1
Hawaii		–		5	–	2	–	0
Arizona		–		4	–	2	–	1
Regis		–		5	–	3	–	0
Gonzaga		–		5	–	3	–	1
Santa Clara		–		5	–	4	–	2
Loyola (CA)		–		4	–	3	–	1
Tempe State		–		2	–	3	–	1
New Mexico A&M		–		3	–	5	–	1
Humboldt State		–		1	–	2	–	0

The 1927 Loyola Lions football team was an American football team that represented Loyola College of Los Angeles (now known as Loyola Marymount University) as an independent during the 1927 college football season. In their fourth season under head coach Harold Hess, the Lions compiled a 4–3–1 record and outscored their opponents by a total of 218 to 81.

== Schedule ==
Date	Opponent	Site	Result	Attendance	Source
October 1	Southwestern University	Loyola Field; Los Angeles, CA	W 57–0		
October 8	Tempe State	Loyola Field; Los Angeles, CA	W 25–3		
October 15	California Christian	Loyola Field; Los Angeles, CA	W 76–7		
October 22	Los Angeles Fire Department	Loyola Field; Los Angeles, CA	W 27–0		
October 29	at Northern Arizona	McMullen Field; Flagstaff, AZ	T 0–0		
November 5	Gonzaga	Loyola Field; Los Angeles, CA	L 7–19		
November 12	Regis	Los Angeles, CA	L 18–20		
November 24	at St. Ignatius (CA)	Kezar Stadium; San Francisco, CA	L 7–32	8,000	
