= Hart-Ransom Union School District =

School district in California

Address
- 3920 Shoemake Avenue Modesto, California, 95358; United States

District information
- Type: Public
- Grades: K–12
- NCES District ID: 0616650

Students and staff
- Students: 1,208 (2020–2021)
- Teachers: 54.66 (FTE)
- Staff: 28.49 (FTE)
- Student–teacher ratio: 22.1:1

Other information
- Website: www.hartransom.org

Hart-Ransom Union School District was, in the 60s and 70s, a K-8 school district in Stanislaus County, California, historically known as Ransom School. The Modesto Bee occasionally reprints a news item from 1901 reporting that a criminal was gunned down by a sheriff on Ransom School's doorstep. Hart School was formerly located on Hart Road. Members of the Hart family still attended the school at least as recently as the mid-70s. Hart-Ransom Charter is a K-12 charter school that recently opened an online High School through Connections Academy. There are many extra-curricular activities that their students can participate in. They are a participant in Science Olympiad with an Elementary, Junior High, and a new High School team.

Hart-Ransom School is a K-8 school that has just won a new fitness center and well as a gym. The school was remodeled in 2006. The school has won the distinguished school Award in 1995 and 2012. Hart-Ransom school district is Hart-Ransom District and also has a charter school named Hart-Ransom Charter.

== Administration ==
- Hart-Ransom School Principal: David Croy
- Hart-Ransom Academic Charter School Principal: Sean Greene
- Superintendent: Matthew Shipley
- Executive Assistant to Superintendent: Debbie Phillips
- Chief Business Officer: Debra Silva
- Vice Principal & Athletic Director: Brian Martins

== Clubs/Activities ==
- Yearbook
- Science Olympiad
- Student council
- PBIS
- The Good News club (Religious organization)
- After school program (Eagle's Nest)
- 2’o clock Care
- Band
- Choir

== Sports ==
- Soccer (6th-8th Co-Ed)
- Basketball (6th-8th)
- Baseball/Softball
- Volleyball (6th-8th)
