= 1927 Arizona Wildcats football team =

American college football season

1927 Arizona Wildcats football
- Conference: Independent
- Record: 4–2–1
- Head coach: Pop McKale (13th season)
- Captain: Martin Gentry

1927 Western college football independents records
	Conf.			Overall
Team	W	L	T	W		L		T
New Mexico		–		8	–	0	–	1
Hawaii		–		5	–	2	–	0
Arizona		–		4	–	2	–	1
Regis		–		5	–	3	–	0
Gonzaga		–		5	–	3	–	1
Santa Clara		–		5	–	4	–	2
Loyola (CA)		–		4	–	3	–	1
Tempe State		–		2	–	3	–	1
New Mexico A&M		–		3	–	5	–	1
Humboldt State		–		1	–	2	–	0

The 1927 Arizona Wildcats football team represented the University of Arizona as an independent during the 1927 college football season. In their 13th season under head coach Pop McKale, the Wildcats compiled a 4–2–1 record and outscored their opponents, 165 to 59. The team captain was Martin Gentry.

== Schedule ==
Date	Opponent	Site	Result	Source
October 1	Occidental	University Field; Tucson, AZ	T 14–14	
October 15	at Texas Mines	El Paso, TX	W 19–6	
October 22	Gila College	University Field; Tucson, AZ	W 65–0	
October 29	New Mexico A&M	University Field; Tucson, AZ	W 33–6	
November 5	at New Mexico	Albuquerque, NM (rivalry)	L 6–7	
November 19	UCLA	University Field; Tucson, AZ	W 16–13	
November 24	Whittier	University Field; Tucson, AZ	L 12–13	
