= 1927 New Mexico A&M Aggies football team =

American college football season

1927 New Mexico A&M Aggies football
- Conference: Independent
- Record: 3–5
- Head coach: Ted Coffman (1st season)
- Home stadium: Miller Field

1927 Western college football independents records
	Conf.			Overall
Team	W	L	T	W		L		T
New Mexico		–		8	–	0	–	1
Hawaii		–		5	–	2	–	0
Arizona		–		4	–	2	–	1
Regis		–		5	–	3	–	0
Gonzaga		–		5	–	3	–	1
Santa Clara		–		5	–	4	–	2
Loyola (CA)		–		4	–	3	–	1
Tempe State		–		2	–	3	–	1
New Mexico A&M		–		3	–	5	–	1
Humboldt State		–		1	–	2	–	0

The 1927 New Mexico A&M Aggies football team was an American football team that represented New Mexico College of Agriculture and Mechanical Arts (now known as New Mexico State University) during the 1927 college football season. In their first year under head coach Ted Coffman, the Aggies compiled a 3–5 record and shut out four opponents. The team played home games on Miller Field, sometimes also referred to as College Field.

== Schedule ==
Date	Opponent	Site	Result	Source
	Beaumont Army Hospital	Las Cruces, NM	W 80–0	
October 8	New Mexico Mines	Las Cruces, NM	W 40–0	
October 15	Sul Ross	Las Cruces, NM	L 6–19	
October 21	New Mexico Teachers	Las Cruces, NM	W 31–0	
October 29	at Arizona	University Field; Tucson, AZ	L 6–33	
November 11	at Texas Mines	El Paso, TX (rivalry)	L 7–19	
November 18	New Mexico^{†}	Las Cruces, NM (rivalry)	L 9–26	
November 24	New Mexico Military		L 6–10	
^{†}Homecoming
