= 1927 Santa Clara Broncos football team =

American college football season

1927 Santa Clara Broncos football
- Conference: Independent
- Record: 5–4–2
- Head coach: Adam Walsh (3rd season)
- Home stadium: Mission Field

1927 Western college football independents records
	Conf.			Overall
Team	W	L	T	W		L		T
New Mexico		–		8	–	0	–	1
Hawaii		–		5	–	2	–	0
Arizona		–		4	–	2	–	1
Regis		–		5	–	3	–	0
Gonzaga		–		5	–	3	–	1
Santa Clara		–		5	–	4	–	2
Loyola (CA)		–		4	–	3	–	1
Tempe State		–		2	–	3	–	1
New Mexico A&M		–		3	–	5	–	1
Humboldt State		–		1	–	2	–	0

The 1927 Santa Clara Broncos football team was an American football team that represented Santa Clara University as an independent during the 1927 college football season. In their third season under head coach Adam Walsh, the Broncos compiled a 5–4–2 record and were outscored by opponents by a total of 143 to 137.

== Schedule ==
Date	Opponent	Site	Result	Attendance	Source
September 24	at California	California Memorial Stadium; Berkeley, CA	L 6–14	30,000	
October 1	at USC	Los Angeles Memorial Coliseum; Los Angeles, CA	L 12–52	35,000	
October 9	at St. Ignatius (CA)	Kezar Stadium; San Francisco, CA	W 12–6		
October 15	at Pacific (CA)	College of the Pacific Field; Stockton, CA	W 36–6		
October 30	at Nevada	Mackay Field; Reno, NV	T 7–7		
November 6	at Olympic Club	Kezar Stadium; San Francisco, CA	L 0–6		
November 12	at Stanford	Stanford Stadium; Stanford, CA	W 13–6		
November 18	at Fresno State	Fresno State College Stadium; Fresno, CA	T 6–6		
November 26	at Saint Mary's	Kezar Stadium; San Francisco, CA	L 0–22		
December 25	at Honolulu Town Team	Honolulu Stadium; Honolulu, HI	W 27–6		
January 2, 1928	at Hawaii	Honolulu Stadium; Honolulu, HI	W 18–12		
