= Amadeo Giannini =

American businessman and banker

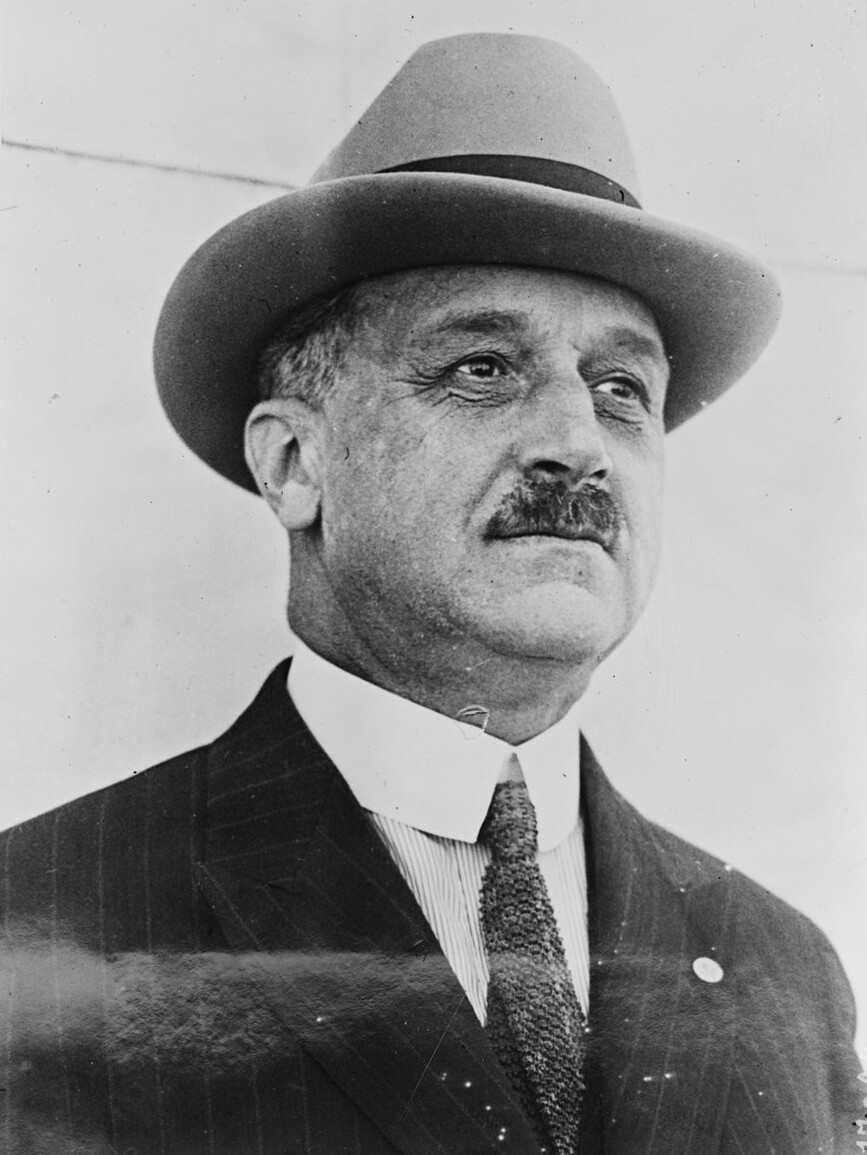
- Amadeo Giannini (1927)
- Born: Amadeo Pietro Giannini; May 6, 1870; San Jose, California, U.S.
- Died: June 3, 1949 (aged 79); San Mateo, California, U.S.
- Resting place: Holy Cross Catholic Cemetery
- Other name: A. P. Giannini
- Spouse: Clorinda Cuneo
- Children: 6, including Claire
- Parents: Luigi Giannini (father); Virginia Demartini (mother)

Amadeo Pietro Giannini (Italian: [amaˈdɛːo ˈpjɛːtro dʒanˈniːni]; May 6, 1870 – June 3, 1949), also known as Amadeo Peter Giannini, was an American banker who founded the Bank of Italy, which eventually became Bank of America. Giannini is credited as the inventor of many modern banking practices. Most notably, Giannini was one of the first bankers to offer banking services to middle-class Americans, mainly Italian immigrants, rather than only the upper class. He also pioneered the holding company structure and established one of the first modern trans-national institutions.

== Background ==
Amadeo Pietro Giannini was born in San Jose, California, to Italian immigrant parents. He was the first son of Luigi Giannini (1840–1877) and Virginia (née Demartini) Giannini (1854–1920). Luigi Giannini immigrated to the United States from Favale di Malvaro near Genoa, Liguria, in the Kingdom of Sardinia (later part of Italy) to prospect in response to the California gold rush of 1849. Luigi continued in gold during the 1860s and returned to Italy in 1869 to marry Virginia, bringing her to the US and settling in San Jose. Luigi Giannini purchased a 40-acre (16 ha) farm at Alviso in 1872 and grew fruits and vegetables for sale. Four years later, Luigi Giannini was fatally shot by an employee over a pay dispute. His widow Virginia, with two children and pregnant with a third child, took over operation of the produce business. In 1880, Virginia married Lorenzo Scatena (1859–1930) who began L. Scatena & Co. (which A. P. Giannini would eventually take over). Giannini attended Heald College but realized he could do better in business than at school. In 1885, he dropped out and took a full-time position as a produce broker for L. Scatena & Co.

Giannini worked as a produce broker, commission merchant and produce dealer for farms in the Santa Clara Valley. He was successful in that business. He married Clorinda Cuneo (1866–1949), daughter of a North Beach, San Francisco real estate magnate, in 1892 and eventually sold his interest to his employees and retired at the age of 31 to administer his father-in-law's estate.

He later became a director of the Columbus Savings & Loan, in which his father-in-law owned an interest. Giannini observed an opportunity to service the increasing immigrant population that were without a bank. At loggerheads with the other directors who did not share his sentiment, he quit the board in frustration and started his own bank.

He was one of the original Board of Directors of the Italian Board of Relief, now known as Italian Community Services, founded in 1916. It is a non-profit organization focused on serving the Italian and Italian-American community.

== Bank of Italy ==
Giannini founded the Bank of Italy in the Jackson Square neighborhood of San Francisco on October 17, 1904. The bank was based in a converted saloon as an institution for the "little fellow". It was a new bank for the hardworking immigrants other banks would not serve. Deposits on the first day totaled $8,780. Within a year, deposits soared above $700,000 ($26.6 million in 2026 dollars). The 1906 San Francisco earthquake and fires leveled much of the city. In the face of widespread devastation, Giannini set up a temporary bank, collecting deposits, making loans, and proclaiming that San Francisco would rise from the ashes.

Immediately after the earthquake, but before the approaching fire burned the city, he moved the vault's money to his home outside the fire zone in then-rural San Mateo, 18 miles (29 km) away. A garbage wagon was used to haul the money, hidden beneath garbage. The fires had heated the vaults of other big banks, so that the sudden temperature change from opening them risked destroying the contents; many vaults were kept closed for weeks. During this period Giannini was one of the few bankers who could satisfy withdrawal requests and provide loans, operating from a plank across two barrels in the street. Giannini made loans on a handshake to those interested in rebuilding. Years later, he would recount that every loan was repaid. As a reward to the garbage man whose wagon transported the bank's assets, Giannini gave the man's son his first job when he turned 14.

Branch banking was introduced by Giannini shortly after 1909 legislation that allowed branch banking in California. Its first branch outside San Francisco was established in 1909 in San Jose. By 1916, Giannini had expanded and opened several other branches. Giannini believed in branch banking as a way to stabilize banks during difficult times as well as expand the capital base. He bought banks throughout California and eventually Bank of Italy had hundreds of branches throughout the state.

== Bank of America ==
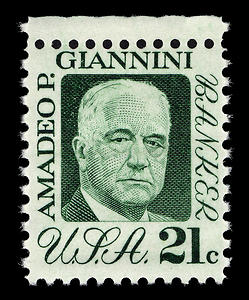
1973 U.S. postage stamp featuring Giannini

Bank of America, Los Angeles had been established in 1923 by Orra E. Monnette. Giannini began investing in the Bank of America, Los Angeles because conservative business leaders in Los Angeles were less receptive to the Bank of Italy than San Franciscans had been. Bank of America, L.A. represented a growth path: the name idealized the broader mission of the new bank. By 1929, the bank had over 400 banking offices in California. The new institution continued under Giannini's chairmanship until his retirement in 1945; Monnette retained his board seat and officer's position. Prior to the creation of the Bank of America Los Angeles network, most banks were limited to a single city or region. The Bank of America was the first to create a system of centralized processing, bookkeeping and cash delivery. By diversifying the scope of community that the Bank of America served following its merger, the institution was better prepared to ride out minor, local economic issues.

Historian Irving Katz concludes that;

Giannini's phenomenal career as a banker grew from his boundless energy, sound insight into human nature, brilliant entrepreneurial abilities, adroit managerial and organizational talents, creativity, good judgment, aggressiveness spilling over at times into ruthlessness, great timing, good luck, and use of innovative methods in attracting investors and expanding loans.

== Film industry and wine industry ==
Giannini helped nurture the motion picture and wine industries in California. He lent Walt Disney the funds to produce Snow White, the first full-length, animated motion picture to be made in the US. During the Great Depression, he bought the bonds that financed the construction of the Golden Gate Bridge. During World War II, he bankrolled industrialist Henry Kaiser and his enterprises supporting the war effort. After the war, he visited Italy and arranged for loans to help rebuild the war-torn Fiat factories. Giannini also provided capital to William Hewlett and David Packard to help form Hewlett-Packard.

== Transamerica Corporation ==
Giannini founded another company, Transamerica Corporation, as a holding company for his various interests, including Occidental Life Insurance Company. At one time, Transamerica was the controlling shareholder in Bank of America. They were separated by legislation enacted by the U.S. Congress in 1956, with the passage of the Bank Holding Company Act, which prohibited bank holding companies' involvement in industrial activities.

== Politics ==
Giannini had long been a Republican, but with the collapse of the Republican Party in the Great Depression, he concerned himself with Democratic state politics. In the 1934 California gubernatorial election Giannini worked hard to block left-wing novelist Upton Sinclair from winning the primary for the Democratic nomination. He failed, and with support from the White House, he endorsed and helped finance the Republican candidate, incumbent Frank Merriam, who did defeat Sinclair.

== Death ==
Upon Giannini's death in 1949, his son Mario Giannini (1894–1952) assumed leadership of the bank before dying in 1952. Giannini's daughter, Claire Giannini Hoffman (1905–1997), took her father's seat on the bank's board of directors, where she remained until resigning in 1985. Giannini is buried at Holy Cross Cemetery in Colma, California.

His son Mario had two daughters, Virginia Hammerness and Anne Giannini McWilliams. Virginia spoke publicly about the bank in 2009.

== Legacy ==
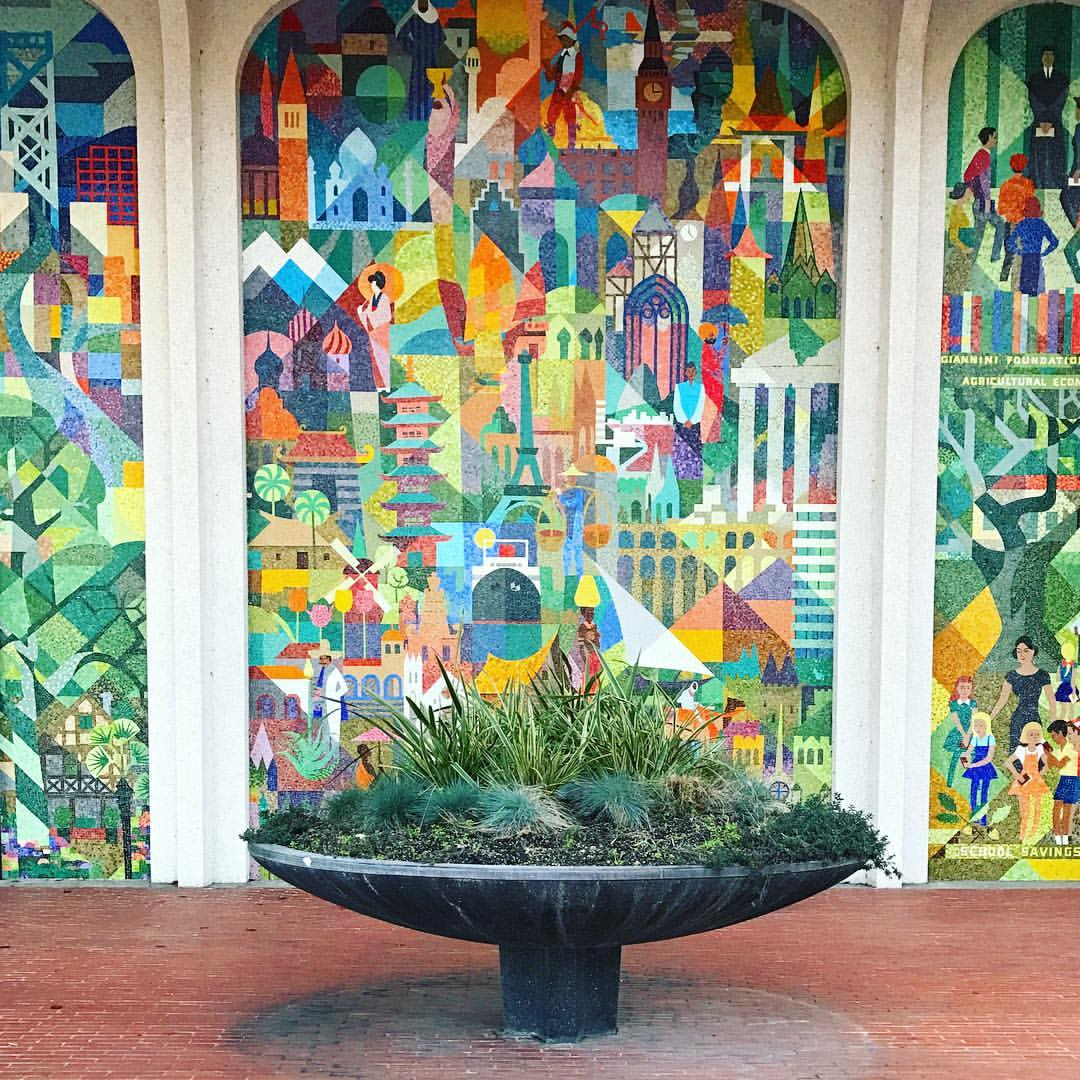
Mosaic mural (1963) tells the story of A. P. Giannini's life. Designed by Louis Macouillard & constructed by Alfonso Pardiñas, located in San Mateo, California.

- His San Mateo estate, "Seven Oaks", purchased in the early 1900s, was located at 20 El Cerrito Avenue, San Mateo, and is now part of the National Register of Historic Places.
- The large plaza of the Bank of America Building, at California Street and Kearny, in downtown San Francisco, is named for and in honor of Giannini.
- A.P. Giannini Middle School, which opened in the Sunset District of San Francisco in 1954, is named after him also.
- Other places and groups named after Giannini include The Giannini Foundation of Agricultural Economics and the building that houses the Department of Agricultural and Resource Economics, at the University of California, Berkeley.
- Tony Martin was cast as Giannini in the 1962 episode "The Unshakeable Man" of the syndicated anthology series Death Valley Days, hosted by Stanley Andrews. The episode is a dramatization of the establishment of the Bank of America. The story line focuses on Giannini saving his bank from the impact of the 1906 San Francisco earthquake and turning it into the largest financial institution in the world. The episode also starred Parley Baer as Crowder.
- There is a 1963 mosaic mural designed by Louis Macouillard and constructed by Alfonso Pardiñas, that illustrates the story of A.P. Giannini's life. Located in front of a mid-century modern style Bank of America branch (formerly a Bank of Italy location) at 300 S. El Camino Real in San Mateo, California.
- In 1963, he was inducted into the Hall of Great Westerners of the National Cowboy & Western Heritage Museum.
- The U.S. Postal Service honored Giannini's contributions to American banking by issuing a 21¢ postage stamp bearing his portrait, in 1973. A ceremony to mark the occasion was held near his former home, in San Mateo.
- Time magazine named Giannini one of the "builders and titans" of the 20th century. He was the only banker named to the Time 100, a list of the most important people of that century, as assembled by the magazine.
- Walter Huston's bank president in Frank Capra's 1932 film American Madness was based largely on Giannini.
- The Italian-American banker played by Edward G. Robinson in House of Strangers (1949), was also loosely based on Giannini.
- American Banker magazine recognized him as one of the five most influential bankers of the 20th century.
- In 2004, the Italian government honored Giannini with an exhibition and ceremony in its Parliament, to mark the centennial of his founding of the Bank of Italy. The exhibition was the result of the collaboration of the Ministry of Finance, the Smithsonian Institution, Italian Professor Guido Crapanzano and Peter F. De Nicola, an American collector of Giannini memorabilia.
- In 2010, Giannini was inducted into the California Hall of Fame.
- A documentary film on Giannini's life, A Little Fellow: The Legacy of A.P. Giannini, was first shown at the Cinequest film festival in San Jose, California on March 14, 2025.
