= 1927 Hawaii Rainbows football team =

American college football season

1927 Hawaii Rainbows football
- Conference: Independent
- Record: 5–2
- Head coach: Otto Klum (7th season)
- Home stadium: Honolulu Stadium

1927 Western college football independents records
| | Conf. | | | Overall |
| Team | W | L | T | W | | L | | T |
|---|---|---|---|---|---|---|---|---|
| New Mexico | | – | | 8 | – | 0 | – | 1 |
| Hawaii | | – | | 5 | – | 2 | – | 0 |
| Arizona | | – | | 4 | – | 2 | – | 1 |
| Regis | | – | | 5 | – | 3 | – | 0 |
| Gonzaga | | – | | 5 | – | 3 | – | 1 |
| Santa Clara | | – | | 5 | – | 4 | – | 2 |
| Loyola (CA) | | – | | 4 | – | 3 | – | 1 |
| Tempe State | | – | | 2 | – | 3 | – | 1 |
| New Mexico A&M | | – | | 3 | – | 5 | – | 1 |
| Humboldt State | | – | | 1 | – | 2 | – | 0 |

The 1927 Hawaii Rainbows football team represented the University of Hawaiʻi (now known as the University of Hawaiʻi at Mānoa) as an independent during the 1927 college football season. Led by seventh-year head coach Otto Klum, the Rainbows compiled an overall record of 5–2.

== Schedule ==
| Date | Opponent | Site | Result | Source |
|---|---|---|---|---|
| October 8 | Hawaii alumni | Maui Fairgrounds; Kahului, Territory of Hawaii | L 2–3 | |
| October 22 | O‘ahu Blues | Honolulu Stadium; Honolulu, Territory of Hawaii | W 20–13 | |
| November 2 | Pearl Harbor Navy | Honolulu Stadium; Honolulu, Territory of Hawaii | W 24–7 | |
| November 11 | Honolulu Town Team | Honolulu Stadium; Honolulu, Territory of Hawaii | W 10–0 | |
| November 24 | at Occidental | Los Angeles Memorial Coliseum; Los Angeles, CA | W 20–0 | |
| December 17 | Utah Agricultural | Honolulu Stadium; Honolulu, Territory of Hawaii | W 21–20 | |
| January 2, 1928 | Santa Clara | Honolulu Stadium; Honolulu, Territory of Hawaii | L 12–18 | |
