= Battle for the Bell (Marshall–Ohio) =

American college football rivalry

- Marshall Thundering Herd Ohio Bobcats
- Sport: Football
- First meeting: November 11, 1905; Marshall, 6–5
- Latest meeting: September 14, 2019; Marshall, 33–31
- Next meeting: September 11, 2027
- Trophy: The Bell

Statistics
- Total meetings: 60
- All-time series: Ohio leads, 33–21–6
- Largest victory: Ohio, 59–0 (1908)
- Longest win streak: Ohio, 6 (1958–1963); Ohio, 6 (1973–1980); Marshall, 6 (2001–2010)
- Longest unbeaten streak: Ohio, 10 (1908–1938)
- Current win streak: Marshall, 1 (2019–present)

Locations of Marshall and Ohio

The Battle for the Bell is an American college football rivalry game played by the Marshall Thundering Herd football team of Marshall University and the Ohio Bobcats football team of Ohio University. It is a regional rivalry, with the universities' campuses located about 80 miles (130 km) from each other, with a bell awarded as the trophy for the winner of the game. While Marshall and Ohio first played in 1905, they did not start playing for "The Bell" until 1997 when Marshall rejoined the Mid-American Conference. With Marshall's move from the MAC to Conference USA in 2005, the rivalry game was on hiatus for several years. The series unexpectedly resumed in 2009 when the Herd and Bobcats faced off in the 2009 Little Caesars Pizza Bowl, which Marshall won 21–17. A six-year contract between the schools began in 2010. The six-year series contract between the two schools was not renewed following the 2015 season. The rivalry resumed in the 2019 season, with additional games scheduled for the 2027, 2028, and 2029 seasons. Ohio leads the all-time series over Marshall 33–21–6.

== Series overview ==
| Statistic | Marshall | Ohio |
|---|---|---|
| Games played | 60 | |
| Wins | 21 | 33 |
| Ties | 6 | |
| Home wins | 14 | 22 |
| Road wins | 6 | 11 |
| Neutral site wins | 1 | 0 |
| Total points scored in the series | 950 | 1299 |
| Most points scored in a game by one team | 44 (2014) | 59 (1908) |
| Most points scored in a game by both teams | 76 (1977 – OU 49, MU 27) | |
| Fewest points scored in a game by both teams | 0 (1933) | |
| Fewest points scored in a game by one team in a win | 6 (1905) | 8 (1934) |
| Most points scored in a game by one team in a loss | 35 (1969) | 31 (2019) |
| Largest margin of victory | 31 (1999) | 59 (1908) |
| Smallest margin of victory | 1 (twice) | 1 (1954) |
| Shut-outs of opposing team | 4 | 12 |

== Game results ==
| Marshall victories | Ohio victories | Tie games |

| No. | Date | Location | Winner | Score |
|---|---|---|---|---|
| 1 | November 11, 1905 | Huntington, WV | Marshall | 6–5 |
| 2 | October 3, 1908 | Athens, OH | Ohio | 59–0 |
| 3 | October 21, 1911 | Athens | Tie | 5–5 |
| 4 | October 20, 1915 | Huntington | Ohio | 21–7 |
| 5 | October 16, 1920 | Athens | Ohio | 55–0 |
| 6 | November 11, 1933 | Huntington | Tie | 0–0 |
| 7 | October 27, 1934 | Athens | Ohio | 8–0 |
| 8 | October 19, 1935 | Athens | Ohio | 20–13 |
| 9 | October 10, 1936 | Athens | Tie | 13–13 |
| 10 | October 30, 1937 | Huntington | Tie | 13–13 |
| 11 | November 19, 1938 | Athens | Ohio | 14–7 |
| 12 | October 29, 1949 | Huntington | Marshall | 14–6 |
| 13 | November 23, 1950 | Athens | Ohio | 14–6 |
| 14 | November 22, 1951 | Huntington | Tie | 13–13 |
| 15 | November 22, 1952 | Athens | Tie | 21–21 |
| 16 | November 21, 1953 | Huntington | Marshall | 9–6 |
| 17 | November 20, 1954 | Athens | Ohio | 26–25 |
| 18 | September 24, 1955 | Athens | Ohio | 13–6 |
| 19 | November 17, 1956 | Athens | Ohio | 16–0 |
| 20 | October 26, 1957 | Huntington | Marshall | 34–28 |
| 21 | October 25, 1958 | Athens | Ohio | 22–0 |
| 22 | November 7, 1959 | Huntington | Ohio | 21–14 |
| 23 | November 5, 1960 | Athens | Ohio | 19–0 |
| 24 | November 4, 1961 | Huntington | Ohio | 14–7 |
| 25 | November 3, 1962 | Athens | Ohio | 35–0 |
| 26 | November 23, 1963 | Huntington | Ohio | 17–0 |
| 27 | November 21, 1964 | Athens | Marshall | 10–0 |
| 28 | November 20, 1965 | Huntington | Marshall | 29–14 |
| 29 | November 19, 1966 | Athens | Ohio | 28–6 |
| 30 | September 23, 1967 | Huntington | Ohio | 48–14 |
| 31 | September 21, 1968 | Athens | Ohio | 48–8 |

| No. | Date | Location | Winner | Score |
|---|---|---|---|---|
| 32 | November 22, 1969 | Huntington | Ohio | 38–35 |
| 33 | November 20, 1971 | Huntington | Ohio | 30–0 |
| 34 | November 18, 1972 | Athens | Marshall | 31–14 |
| 35 | November 18, 1973 | Huntington | Ohio | 35–21 |
| 36 | November 23, 1974 | Athens | Ohio | 35–0 |
| 37 | November 22, 1975 | Huntington | Ohio | 38–21 |
| 38 | September 10, 1977 | Huntington | Ohio | 49–27 |
| 39 | September 22, 1979 | Athens | Ohio | 35–0 |
| 40 | November 8, 1980 | Athens | Ohio | 28–20 |
| 41 | September 14, 1985 | Huntington | Marshall | 31–7 |
| 42 | September 13, 1986 | Athens | Marshall | 21–7 |
| 43 | September 12, 1987 | Athens | Ohio | 23–15 |
| 44 | September 10, 1988 | Huntington | Marshall | 31–14 |
| 45 | November 15, 1997 | Huntington | Marshall | 27–0 |
| 46 | October 10, 1998 | Athens | Marshall | 30–23 |
| 47 | October 30, 1999 | Huntington | #12 Marshall | 34–3 |
| 48 | November 18, 2000 | Athens | Ohio | 38–28 |
| 49 | November 17, 2001 | Huntington | #24 Marshall | 42–18 |
| 50 | November 23, 2002 | Athens | Marshall | 24–21 |
| 51 | November 28, 2003 | Huntington | Marshall | 28–0 |
| 52 | October 9, 2004 | Athens | Marshall | 16–13 |
| 53 | December 26, 2009 | Detroit, MI | Marshall | 21–17 |
| 54 | September 25, 2010 | Huntington | Marshall | 24–23 |
| 55 | September 17, 2011 | Athens | Ohio | 44–7 |
| 56 | September 15, 2012 | Huntington | Ohio | 27–24 |
| 57 | September 14, 2013 | Athens | Ohio | 34–31 |
| 58 | September 13, 2014 | Huntington | Marshall | 44–14 |
| 59 | September 12, 2015 | Athens | Ohio | 21–10 |
| 60 | September 14, 2019 | Huntington | Marshall | 33–31 |
Series: Ohio leads 33–21–6
The 1970 meeting was canceled due to the crash of Southern Airways Flight 932. The 2020 meeting was canceled due to the COVID-19 pandemic.

== See also ==
- List of NCAA college football rivalry games
