= 1927 Stanford football team =

American college football season

1927 Stanford football

PCC co-champion Rose Bowl champion

Rose Bowl, W 7–6 vs. Pittsburgh
- Conference: Pacific Coast Conference
- Record: 8–2–1 (4–0–1 PCC)
- Head coach: Pop Warner (4th season)
- Offensive scheme: Double-wing
- Home stadium: Stanford Stadium

1927 Pacific Coast Conference football standings
	Conf.					Overall
Team	W		L		T	W		L		T
Stanford ^ +	4	–	0	–	1	8	–	2	–	1
No. 10 USC +	4	–	0	–	1	8	–	1	–	1
Idaho +	2	–	0	–	2	4	–	1	–	3
Washington	4	–	2	–	0	9	–	2	–	0
Oregon State	2	–	3	–	0	3	–	3	–	1
California	2	–	3	–	0	7	–	3	–	0
Washington State	1	–	3	–	1	3	–	3	–	2
Oregon	0	–	4	–	1	2	–	4	–	1
Montana	0	–	4	–	0	3	–	4	–	1
+ – Conference co-champions; ^ – Selected as Rose Bowl representative; Rankings from Dickinson System

The 1927 Stanford football team represented Stanford University in the 1927 college football season. In head coach Pop Warner's fourth season, Stanford was undefeated in the Pacific Coast Conference, with a tie in the game against USC. With a three-way tie for the conference championship, Stanford was chosen to represent the conference in the 1928 Rose Bowl against Pittsburgh, with Stanford winning its first Rose Bowl in its fourth attempt, 7–6.

The team played its home games at Stanford Stadium in Stanford, California and competed in the Pacific Coast Conference.

== Schedule ==
Date	Opponent	Site	Result	Attendance	Source
September 24	Fresno State*	Stanford Stadium; Stanford, CA	W 33–0	15,000	
September 24	Olympic Club*	Stanford Stadium; Stanford, CA	W 7–6	15,000	
October 1	Saint Mary's*	Stanford Stadium; Stanford, CA	L 0–16	38,000	
October 8	Nevada*	Stanford Stadium; Stanford, CA	W 20–2		
October 15	USC	Stanford Stadium; Stanford, CA (rivalry)	T 13–13	65,000	
October 22	at Oregon State	Multnomah Stadium; Portland, OR	W 20–6	20,000	
October 29	Oregon	Stanford Stadium; Stanford, CA	W 19–0		
November 5	at Washington	Husky Stadium; Seattle, WA	W 13–7	28,172	
November 12	Santa Clara*	Stanford Stadium; Stanford, CA	L 6–13		
November 19	California	Stanford Stadium; Stanford, CA (Big Game)	W 13–6	88,000	
January 2, 1928	vs. Pittsburgh*	Rose Bowl; Pasadena, CA (Rose Bowl)	W 7–6	58,000	
*Non-conference game
