= 1928 Rose Bowl =

American college football game

- 14th Rose Bowl Game
Pittsburgh Panthers	Stanford
(8–0–1)	(7–2–1)
Independent	PCC
6	7
Head coach: Jock Sutherland	Head coach: Pop Warner
	1	2	3	4	Total
Pittsburgh	0	0	6	0	6
Stanford	0	0	7	0	7
- Date: January 2, 1928
- Season: 1927
- Stadium: Rose Bowl
- Location: Pasadena, California
- MVP: Biff Hoffman (FB) – Stanford
- Attendance: 70,000

The 1928 Rose Bowl Game was a match between Stanford (7–2–1) and the Pittsburgh Panthers (8–0–1). Usually, the Rose Bowl was played on January 1, but in 1928, that fell on a Sunday, so the game was played on January 2, 1928. At this time, the Rose Bowl was the top and only bowl game, an east-vs.-west matchup. Stanford won the game, 7–6.

== Coaching ==
The coach for Pittsburgh was Jock Sutherland, while the Stanford coach was Pop Warner. Sutherland had played on several of Warner's Pitt teams while Warner was head coach at Pitt. Warner was head coach at Pitt from 1915 to 1923 and coached the Panthers to three undefeated seasons, 33 straight wins, and was credited with three national championships for Pitt before going to Stanford in 1924.

== Game summary ==
Stanford's Frank Wilton had been the goat of the 1927 Rose Bowl: with Stanford leading 7–0 late in the game, an Alabama defender broke through the line and blocked his punt, setting up the Tide's tying touchdown. In the 1928 game, Wilton again made a critical error, losing the ball after being hit on his own 20 yard line, allowing Pittsburgh's Jimmy Hagan to run the fumble in for a touchdown. Walt Heinecke of Stanford blocked Allen Booth's point after attempt, holding Pitt's lead to 6–0. Later in the game, Wilton had his redemption when teammate Spud Lewis fumbled a yard from the goal. Wilton scooped up the ball and crashed through for the tying touchdown. The kick was good, and Stanford held on for a 7–6 win.

== Scoring ==
=== Third quarter ===
- Pitt – Jimmy Hagan, 17-yard run (off Stanford fumble) (Booth kick failed)
- Stan – Frankie Wilton, 5-yard run (off Stanford fumble) (Hoffman kick good)

== Individual stats ==
=== Rushing ===
- Stanford: Hoffman 25–82; Hyland 5–19; Post 3–10
- Pitt: Welch 10–53; Booth 8–32

== Game notes ==
The capacity of the Pasadena Rose Bowl Stadium was increased to 76,000, adding 19,000 seats. At game time, the temperature was 70 °F (21 °C).
