= List of Ohio Bobcats men's basketball seasons =

The following is a list of seasons completed by the Ohio Bobcats men's basketball program at Ohio University in Athens, Ohio, United States. The team was established in 1907 and plays at the Division I level of the National Collegiate Athletic Association (NCAA) as members of the Mid-American Conference (MAC). Ohio played Ohio Athletic Conference (OAC) from 1912 to 1926, the Buckeye Athletic Association from 1926 to 1939 and as an independent from 1939 to 1946. Ohio was a founding member of the MAC in 1946 where they have remained since. Since 1968, the team has played home games at the Convocation Center. Through the 2024–25 season, the Bobcats have won fourteen Mid-American Conference regular-season championships and seven MAC tournament titles. In post-season play, the program has made fourteen appearances in the NCAA tournament, advancing to the Elite Eight in 1964 with three Sweet 16 appearances.

== Yearly results ==
Conference division champions	Conference champions	Conference tournament champions	Postseason berth

Season	Head coach	Season results							Conference tournament result	Postseason result	Final Coaches Poll
Season	Head coach	Overall			Conference				Conference tournament result	Postseason result	Final Coaches Poll
Season	Head coach	Wins	Losses	%	Wins	Losses	%	Finish	Conference tournament result	Postseason result	Final Coaches Poll
Independent
1907–08	James C. Jones	7	4	.636	—	—	—	—	—	—	—
1908–09	James C. Jones	1	1	.500	—	—	—	—	—	—	—
1909–10	James C. Jones	2	5	.286	—	—	—	—	—	—	—
1910–11	John Corbett	3	4	.778	—	—	—	—	—	—	—
Ohio Athletic Conference
1911–12	Arthur W. Hinaman	2	9	.182	—	—	—	—	—	—	—
1912–13	C. M. Douthit	5	8	.385	2	6	.250	—	—	—	—
1913–14	M. B. Banks	3	10	.231	1	7	.125	—	—	—	—
1914–15	M. B. Banks	11	4	.733	8	3	.727	—	—	—	—
1915–16	M. B. Banks	8	7	.533	5	2	.714	—	—	—	—
1916–17	M. B. Banks	2	14	.125	1	11	.083	—	—	—	—
1917–18	M. B. Banks	4	8	.333	4	5	.444	—	—	—	—
1918–19	Frank Gullum	5	4	.556	3	4	.429	—	—	—	—
1919–20	Frank Gullum	5	6	.455	4	4	.500	—	—	—	—
1920–21	Russ Finsterwald	15	2	.882	6	1	.857	1st	—	—	—
1921–22	Russ Finsterwald	19	4	.826	11	2	.846	—	—	—	—
1922–23	Butch Grover	11	8	.579	—	—	—	—	—	—	—
1923–24	Butch Grover	16	5	.762	9	3	.750	T-6th	—	—	—
1924–25	Butch Grover	12	6	.667	8	5	.615	T-6th	—	—	—
1925–26	Butch Grover	15	9	.625	—	—	—	—	—	—	—
Buckeye Athletic Association
1926–27	Butch Grover	8	13	.381	3	7	.300	—	—	—	—
1927–28	Butch Grover	10	10	.500	4	6	.400	—	—	—	—
1928–29	Butch Grover	10	10	.500	3	7	.300	—	—	—	—
1929–30	Butch Grover	12	9	.571	4	4	.500	—	—	—	—
1930–31	Butch Grover	12	4	.750	7	1	.875	1st	—	—	—
1931–32	Butch Grover	11	10	.524	4	6	.400	—	—	—	—
1932–33	Butch Grover	16	4	.800	7	3	.700	1st	—	—	—
1933–34	Butch Grover	5	14	.263	2	6	.250	—	—	—	—
1934–35	Butch Grover	11	9	.550	5	5	.500	—	—	—	—
1935–36	Butch Grover	13	7	.650	7	3	.700	—	—	—	—
1936–37	Butch Grover	18	3	.857	10	1	.909	T-1st	—	—	—
1937–38	Butch Grover	12	8	.600	4	6	.400	—	—	—	—
1938–39	Dutch Trautwein	12	8	.600	4	4	.500	—	—	—	—
Independent
1939–40	Dutch Trautwein	19	9	.760	—	—	—	—	—	—	—
1940–41	Dutch Trautwein	18	4	.818	—	—	—	—	—	2–1 in NIT (Runner up)	—
1941–42	Dutch Trautwein	12	9	.571	—	—	—	—	—	—	—
1942–43	Dutch Trautwein	11	7	.611	—	—	—	—	—	—	—
1943–44	Dutch Trautwein	9	7	.563	—	—	—	—	—	—	—
1944–45	Dutch Trautwein	11	8	.579	—	—	—	—	—	—	—
1945–46	Dutch Trautwein	15	5	.750	—	—	—	—	—	—	—
Mid-American Conference
1946–47	Dutch Trautwein	13	10	.565	5	3	.625	3rd	—	—	—
1947–48	Dutch Trautwein	10	10	.500	4	4	.500	3rd	—	—	—
1948–49	Dutch Trautwein	6	16	.273	2	8	.200	6th	—	—	—
1949–50	Jim Snyder	6	14	.300	3	7	.300	4th	—	—	—
1950–51	Jim Snyder	13	11	.542	4	4	.500	T-2nd	—	—	—
1951–52	Jim Snyder	12	12	.500	6	6	.500	4th	—	—	—
1952–53	Jim Snyder	9	13	.409	4	8	.333	5th	—	—	—
1953–54	Jim Snyder	12	10	.545	5	7	.417	6th	—	—	—
1954–55	Jim Snyder	16	5	.762	9	5	.357	T-3rd	—	—	—
1955–56	Jim Snyder	13	11	.542	5	7	.417	T-5th	—	—	—
1956–57	Jim Snyder	15	8	.652	7	5	.583	T-3rd	—	—	—
1957–58	Jim Snyder	16	8	.667	7	5	.583	3rd	—	—	—
1958–59	Jim Snyder	14	10	.583	6	6	.500	3rd	—	—	—
1959–60	Jim Snyder	17	8	.680	10	2	.833	1st	—	1–2 in NCAA tournament (Sweet 16)	—
1960–61	Jim Snyder	17	7	.708	10	2	.833	1st	—	0–1 in NCAA tournament	—
1961–62	Jim Snyder	13	10	.565	8	4	.667	2nd	—	—	—
1962–63	Jim Snyder	13	11	.542	8	4	.667	T-2nd	—	—	—
1963–64	Jim Snyder	21	6	.778	10	2	.833	1st	—	2–1 in NCAA tournament (Elite Eight)	—
1964–65	Jim Snyder	19	7	.731	11	1	.917	T-1st	—	0–1 in NCAA tournament	—
1965–66	Jim Snyder	13	10	.565	6	6	.500	3rd	—	—	—
1966–67	Jim Snyder	8	15	.348	4	8	.333	T-5th	—	—	—
1967–68	Jim Snyder	7	16	.304	3	9	.250	T-6th	—	—	—
1968–69	Jim Snyder	17	9	.654	9	3	.750	2nd	—	1–1 in NIT	—
1969–70	Jim Snyder	20	5	.800	9	1	.900	1st	—	0–1 in NCAA tournament	—
1970–71	Jim Snyder	17	7	.708	6	4	.600	2nd	—	—	—
1971–72	Jim Snyder	15	11	.577	7	3	.700	1st	—	0–1 in NCAA tournament	—
1972–73	Jim Snyder	16	10	.615	6	5	.545	4th	—	—	—
1973–74	Jim Snyder	16	11	.593	11	3	.786	1st	—	0–1 in NCAA tournament	—
1974–75	Dale Bandy	12	14	.462	4	10	.286	7th	—	—	—
1975–76	Dale Bandy	11	15	.423	7	9	.438	T-6th	—	—	—
1976–77	Dale Bandy	9	17	.346	4	12	.250	T-8th	—	—	—
1977–78	Dale Bandy	13	14	.481	6	10	.375	T-7th	—	—	—
1978–79	Dale Bandy	16	11	.593	10	6	.625	3rd	—	—	—
1979–80	Dale Bandy	8	18	.308	5	11	.313	10th	DNQ	—	—
1980–81	Danny Nee	7	20	.259	6	10	.375	T-7th	1–1; Lost in quarterfinals	—	—
1981–82	Danny Nee	13	14	.481	8	8	.500	T-4th	0–1; Lost in quarterfinals	—	—
1982–83	Danny Nee	23	9	.719	12	6	.667	2nd	3–0; Won Tournament	1–1 in NCAA tournament	—
1983–84	Danny Nee	20	8	.714	14	4	.778	2nd	0–1; Lost in quarterfinals	—	—
1984–85	Danny Nee	22	8	.733	14	4	.778	1st	2–0; Won Tournament	0–1 in NCAA tournament	—
1985–86	Danny Nee	22	8	.733	14	4	.778	2nd	1–1; Lost in semifinals	—	—
1986–87	Billy Hahn	14	14	.500	7	9	.438	T-5th	0–1; Lost in quarterfinals	—	—
1987–88	Billy Hahn	16	14	.533	9	7	.563	3rd	2–1; Lost in final	—	—
1988–89	Billy Hahn	12	17	.414	6	10	.375	T-8th	1–1; Lost in quarterfinals	—	—
1989–90	Larry Hunter	12	16	.429	5	11	.313	8th	0–1; Lost in quarterfinals	—	—
1990–91	Larry Hunter	16	12	.571	9	7	.563	T-4th	0–1; Lost in quarterfinals	—	—
1991–92	Larry Hunter	18	10	.643	10	6	.625	4th	0–1; Lost in quarterfinals	—	—
1992–93	Larry Hunter	14	13	.519	11	7	.611	4th	0–1; Lost in quarterfinals	—	—
1993–94	Larry Hunter	25	8	.758	14	4	.778	1st	3–0; Won Tournament	0–1 in NCAA tournament	—
1994–95	Larry Hunter	24	10	.706	13	5	.722	2nd	1–1; Lost in semifinals	0–1 in NIT	—
1995–96	Larry Hunter	16	14	.533	11	7	.611	T-4th	0–1; Lost in quarterfinals	—	—
1996–97	Larry Hunter	17	10	.630	12	6	.667	3rd	0–1; Lost in quarterfinals	—	—
1997–98	Larry Hunter	5	21	.192	3	15	.167	6th-East	DNQ	—	—
1998–99	Larry Hunter	18	10	.643	12	6	.667	T-3rd-East	1–1; Lost in semifinals	—	—
1999–00	Larry Hunter	20	13	.909	11	7	.611	T-3rd-East	2–1; Lost in semifinals	—	—
2000–01	Larry Hunter	19	11	.667	12	6	.667	T-2nd-East	2–1; Lost in semifinals	—	—
2001–02	Tim O'Shea	17	11	.607	11	7	.611	3rd-East	0–1; Lost in first round	—	—
2002–03	Tim O'Shea	14	16	.444	8	10	.444	5th-East	2–1; Lost in semifinals	—	—
2003–04	Tim O'Shea	10	20	.333	7	11	.389	T-5th-East	0–1; Lost in first round	—	—
2004–05	Tim O'Shea	21	11	.656	11	7	.611	T-2nd-East	4–0; Won tournament	0–1 in NCAA tournament	—
2005–06	Tim O'Shea	19	11	.633	10	8	.556	T-4th-East	2–1; Lost in semifinals	—	—
2006–07	Tim O'Shea	19	13	.594	9	7	.563	4th-East	1–1; Lost in quarterfinals	—	—
2007–08	Tim O'Shea	20	13	.588	9	7	.563	T-3rd-East	0–1; Lost in quarterfinals	—	—
2008–09	John Groce	15	17	.469	7	9	.438	6th-East	1–1; Lost in quarterfinals	—	—
2009–10	John Groce	22	15	.595	7	9	.438	5th-East	4–0; Won tournament	1–1 in NCAA tournament	—
2010–11	John Groce	19	16	.543	9	7	.563	T-3rd-East	1–1; Lost in quarterfinals	1–1 in CIT	—
2011–12	John Groce	21	12	.636	10	6	.625	4th-East	3–0; Won tournament	2–1 in NCAA tournament (Sweet 16)	#25
2012–13	Jim Christian	24	10	.706	14	2	.875	T-1st-East	1–1; Lost in final	0–1 in NIT	—
2013–14	Jim Christian	25	12	.676	11	7	.611	3rd-East	2–1; Lost in quarterfinals	—	—
2014–15	Saul Phillips	10	20	.333	5	13	.278	6th-East	0–1; Lost in first round	—	—
2015–16	Saul Phillips	23	12	.657	11	7	.611	2nd-East	1–1; Lost in semifinals	1–1 in CBI	—
2016–17	Saul Phillips	20	11	.645	11	7	.611	T-2nd-East	1–1; lost in semifinals	—	—
2017–18	Saul Phillips	14	17	.667	7	11	.389	T-4th-East	0–1; Lost in first round	—	—
2018–19	Saul Phillips	14	17	.452	6	12	.611	6th-East	0–1; Lost in first round	—	—
2019–20	Jeff Boals	17	15	.531	8	10	.444	5th-East	1–0; tournament canceled	No postseason held	—
2020–21	Jeff Boals	17	8	.680	9	5	.643	5th	3–0; Won tournament	1–1 in NCAA tournament	—
2021–22	Jeff Boals	25	10	.714	14	6	.700	T-3rd	1–1; Lost in semifinals	1–1 in CBI	—
2022–23	Jeff Boals	19	14	.576	10	8	.556	5th	1–1; Lost in semifinals	—	—
2023–24	Jeff Boals	20	13	.606	13	5	.722	T-2nd	1–1; Lost in semifinals	—	—
2024–25	Jeff Boals	16	16	.500	10	8	.556	T-4th	0–1; Lost in quarterfinals	—	—
2025–26	Jeff Boals	15	17	.469	9	9	.500	T-5th	0–1; Lost in quarterfinals	—	—
2026–27	Jeff Boals	3	1	.750	0	0	–			—	—
Totals | 119 seasons		1,667	1,247	.572	676	533	.559 (MAC)	10 MAC, 3 BAC, 1 OAC Regular-season titles	7 MAC tournament titles	8–15 in NCAA tournament	

Conference division champions	Conference champions	Conference tournament champions	Postseason berth
