= 1938 Marshall Thundering Herd football team =

American college football season

1938 Marshall Thundering Herd football
- Conference: Buckeye Athletic Association
- Record: 5–4 (3–1 BAA)
- Head coach: Cam Henderson (4th season)
- Captain: Nelson Bragg
- Home stadium: Fairfield Stadium

1938 Buckeye Athletic Association football standings
	Conf.					Overall
Team	W		L		T	W		L		T
Dayton +	3	–	1	–	0	7	–	2	–	0
Ohio +	3	–	1	–	0	7	–	2	–	0
Marshall	2	–	2	–	0	5	–	4	–	0
Miami (OH)	1	–	3	–	0	6	–	3	–	0
Ohio Wesleyan	1	–	3	–	0	1	–	9	–	0
+ – Conference co-champions

The 1938 Marshall Thundering Herd football team was an American football team that represented Marshall University in the Buckeye Conference during the 1938 college football season. In its fourth season under head coach Cam Henderson, the team compiled a 5–4 record, 3–1 against conference opponents, and outscored opponents by a total of 274 to 67. Nelson Bragg was the team captain.

== Schedule ==
Date	Opponent	Site	Result	Attendance	Source
September 24	Carson–Newman*	Fairfield Stadium; Huntington, WV	W 44–0		
October 1	Ohio Wesleyan	Fairfield Stadium; Huntington, WV	W 62–0		
October 8	Miami (OH)	Fairfield Stadium; Huntington, WV	W 41–0	7,000	
October 15	Oklahoma City*	Fairfield Stadium; Huntington, WV	W 66–0	6,500	
October 22	at Toledo*	Glass Bowl; Toledo, OH	L 7–13		
October 29	at Dayton	Fairfield Stadium; Huntington, WV	L 7–13	12,000	
November 5	Furman*	Fairfield Stadium; Huntington, WV	L 13–18	8,000	
November 12	at Cincinnati*	Nippert Stadium; Cincinnati, OH	W 27–9		
November 19	at Ohio	Ohio Stadium; Athens, OH (rivalry)	L 7–14		
*Non-conference game
