= 1937 Dayton Flyers football team =

American college football season

1937 Dayton Flyers football
- Conference: Buckeye Athletic Association
- Record: 7–2 (4–1 BAA)
- Head coach: Harry Baujan (15th season)
- Home stadium: University of Dayton Stadium

1937 Buckeye Athletic Association football standings
	Conf.					Overall
Team	W		L		T	W		L		T
Marshall $	4	–	0	–	1	9	–	0	–	1
Dayton	4	–	1	–	0	7	–	2	–	0
Ohio	3	–	1	–	1	5	–	3	–	1
Miami (OH)	2	–	3	–	0	4	–	4	–	1
Ohio Wesleyan	1	–	4	–	0	2	–	7	–	0
Cincinnati	0	–	5	–	0	0	–	10	–	0
$ – Conference champion

The 1937 Dayton Flyers football team was an American football team that represented the University of Dayton as a member of the Buckeye Athletic Association during the 1937 college football season. In its 15th season under head coach Harry Baujan, the team compiled a 7–2 record.

== Schedule ==
Date	Opponent	Site	Result	Attendance	Source
September 24	at Wittenberg*	Springfield, OH	W 28–7		
October 1	Ohio Wesleyan	University of Dayton Stadium; Dayton, OH	W 19–7		
October 9	at Cincinnati	Nippert Stadium; Cincinnati, OH	W 35–0	8,000	
October 15	at John Carroll*	Municipal Stadium; Cleveland, OH	W 14–7		
October 23	at Ohio	Ohio Stadium; Athens, OH	W 6–0	7,500	
October 30	Western Reserve*	University of Dayton Stadium; Dayton, OH	W 18–6	12,000	
November 6	Toledo*	University Stadium; Toledo, OH	L 7–12		
November 13	Miami (OH)^{†}	University of Dayton Stadium; Dayton, OH	W 21–7		
November 20	at Marshall	Fairfield Stadium; Huntington, WV	L 0–7		
*Non-conference game; ^{†}Homecoming
