= 1937 Ohio Bobcats football team =

American college football season

1937 Ohio Bobcats football
- Conference: Buckeye Athletic Association
- Record: 5–3–1 (3–1–1 BAA)
- Head coach: Don Peden (14th season)
- Home stadium: Ohio Stadium

1937 Buckeye Athletic Association football standings
	Conf.					Overall
Team	W		L		T	W		L		T
Marshall $	4	–	0	–	1	9	–	0	–	1
Dayton	4	–	1	–	0	7	–	2	–	0
Ohio	3	–	1	–	1	5	–	3	–	1
Miami (OH)	2	–	3	–	0	4	–	4	–	1
Ohio Wesleyan	1	–	4	–	0	2	–	7	–	0
Cincinnati	0	–	5	–	0	0	–	10	–	0
$ – Conference champion

The 1937 Ohio Bobcats football team was an American football team that represented Ohio University as a member of the Buckeye Athletic Association (BAA) during the 1937 college football season. In their 14th season under head coach Don Peden, the Bobcats compiled a 5–3–1 record (3–1–1 against conference opponents), finished in third place in the BAA, and outscored opponents by a total of 168 to 52.

== Schedule ==
Date	Opponent	Site	Result	Attendance	Source
September 18	Rio Grande	Ohio Stadium; Athens, OH	W 80–0		
September 25	at Illinois	Memorial Stadium; Champaign, IL	L 6–20	20,059	
October 9	at Western Reserve	League Park; Cleveland, OH	L 0–7		
October 16	Miami (OH)^{†}	Ohio Stadium; Athens, OH (rivalry)	W 19–0		
October 23	Dayton	Ohio Stadium; Athens, OH	L 0–6	7,500	
October 30	Marshall	Fairfield Stadium; Huntington, WV (rivalry)	T 13–13		
November 6	at Cincinnati	Nippert Stadium; Cincinnati, OH	W 17–0		
November 13	at Rutgers	Neilson Field; New Brunswick, NJ	W 13–0	4,000	
November 20	Ohio Wesleyan	Ohio Stadium; Athens, OH	W 20–6		
^{†}Homecoming
