= 1937 Marshall Thundering Herd football team =

American college football season

1937 Marshall Thundering Herd football

BAA champion
- Conference: Buckeye Athletic Association, West Virginia Intercollegiate Athletic Conference
- Record: 9–0–1 (4–0–1 BAA, 2–0 WVIAC)
- Head coach: Cam Henderson (3rd season)
- Captain: Bill Smith
- Home stadium: Fairfield Stadium

1937 Buckeye Athletic Association football standings
	Conf.					Overall
Team	W		L		T	W		L		T
Marshall $	4	–	0	–	1	9	–	0	–	1
Dayton	4	–	1	–	0	7	–	2	–	0
Ohio	3	–	1	–	1	5	–	3	–	1
Miami (OH)	2	–	3	–	0	4	–	4	–	1
Ohio Wesleyan	1	–	4	–	0	2	–	7	–	0
Cincinnati	0	–	5	–	0	0	–	10	–	0
$ – Conference champion

1937 West Virginia Intercollegiate Athletic Conference football standings
	Conf.					Overall
Team	W		L		T	W		L		T
Potomac State +	4	–	0	–	0	4	–	0	–	0
Glenville State +	4	–	0	–	0	4	–	2	–	0
Concord	3	–	1	–	1	5	–	2	–	1
Morris Harvey	3	–	4	–	0	5	–	4	–	0
West Liberty State	2	–	3	–	1	4	–	1	–	1
Fairmont State	1	–	5	–	1	1	–	6	–	1
Salem	0	–	5	–	2	0	–	6	–	2
Marshall *	2	–	0	–	0	9	–	0	–	1
Davis & Elkins *	2	–	0	–	0	2	–	6	–	0
New River State *	2	–	1	–	0	5	–	2	–	0
Bethany (WV) *	1	–	2	–	0	2	–	6	–	0
West Virginia Wesleyan *	1	–	2	–	0	1	–	7	–	1
Shepherd *	0	–	2	–	1	2	–	4	–	1
+ – Conference co-champions; * – Did not qualify for conference standings Ties did not count in conference standings.

The 1937 Marshall Thundering Herd football team represented Marshall College (now Marshall University) as a member of the Buckeye Athletic Association (BAA) and the West Virginia Intercollegiate Athletic Conference (WVIAC) during the 1937 college football season. Marshall outscored its opposition 297–19, posting a 9–0–1 record and winning the BAA title with a mark of 4–0–1 in conference play. Marshall had a 2–0 record against WVIAC opponents, but did not play enough conference games to qualify for the WVAC standings. The team's only blemish came in a tie against Ohio. Marshall played their home games for the 11th consecutive season at Fairfield Stadium, their home venue until the conclusion of the 1990 season, when it was demolished and replaced by Joan C. Edwards Stadium.

== Schedule ==
Date	Opponent	Site	Result	Attendance	Source
September 25	Salem	Fairfield Stadium; Huntington, WV	W 47–0		
October 1	Western Maryland*	Fairfield Stadium; Huntington, WV	W 21–0		
October 9	at Miami (OH)	Miami Field; Oxford, OH	W 7–0	6,500	
October 16	at Ohio Wesleyan	Selby Field; Delaware, OH	W 21–6		
October 22	Georgetown (KY)*	Fairfield Stadium; Huntington, WV	W 90–0		
October 30	Ohio	Fairfield Stadium; Huntington, WV (rivalry)	T 13–13		
November 6	Centre*	Fairfield Stadium; Huntington, WV	W 36–0	8,000	
November 13	Cincinnati	Fairfield Stadium; Huntington, WV	W 28–0	6,000	
November 20	at Dayton	Harry Baujan; Dayton, OH	W 7–0		
November 25	West Virginia Wesleyan	Fairfield Stadium; Huntington, WV	W 27–0		
*Non-conference game
