= 1938 Miami Redskins football team =

American college football season

1938 Miami Redskins football
- Conference: Buckeye Athletic Association
- Record: 6–3 (1–3 BAA)
- Head coach: Frank Wilton (7th season)
- Home stadium: Miami Field

1938 Buckeye Athletic Association football standings
	Conf.					Overall
Team	W		L		T	W		L		T
Dayton +	3	–	1	–	0	7	–	2	–	0
Ohio +	3	–	1	–	0	7	–	2	–	0
Marshall	2	–	2	–	0	5	–	4	–	0
Miami (OH)	1	–	3	–	0	6	–	3	–	0
Ohio Wesleyan	1	–	3	–	0	1	–	9	–	0
+ – Conference co-champions

The 1938 Miami Redskins football team was an American football team that represented Miami University as a member of the Buckeye Athletic Association (BAA) during the 1938 college football season. In their seventh season under head coach Frank Wilton, the Redskins compiled a 6–3 record.

== Schedule ==
Date	Opponent	Site	Result	Attendance	Source
September 24	Alma*	Miami Field; Oxford, OH	W 51–0	4,000	
October 1	at Mount Union*	Alliance, OH	W 40–0		
October 8	at Marshall	Huntington, WV	L 0–41	7,000	
October 15	Findlay*	Miami Field; Oxford, OH	W 53–0		
October 22	Dayton	Miami Field; Oxford, OH	W 14–0		
October 29	at Ohio Wesleyan	Delaware, OH	L 16–20		
November 5	Ohio	Miami Field; Oxford, OH (rivalry)	L 12–20	9,000	
November 12	at Case*	Cleveland, OH	W 27–12		
November 24	at Cincinnati*	Nippert Stadium; Cincinnati, OH (Victory Bell)	W 16–7	10,000	
*Non-conference game
