= 1937 Cincinnati Bearcats football team =

American college football season

1937 Cincinnati Bearcats football
- Conference: Buckeye Athletic Association
- Record: 0–10 (0–5 BAA)
- Head coach: Russ Cohen (3rd season; first 5 games); Wade Woodworth (interim, final 5 games)
- Captain: Wade Woodworth
- Home stadium: Nippert Stadium

1937 Buckeye Athletic Association football standings
	Conf.					Overall
Team	W		L		T	W		L		T
Marshall $	4	–	0	–	1	9	–	0	–	1
Dayton	4	–	1	–	0	7	–	2	–	0
Ohio	3	–	1	–	1	5	–	3	–	1
Miami (OH)	2	–	3	–	0	4	–	4	–	1
Ohio Wesleyan	1	–	4	–	0	2	–	7	–	0
Cincinnati	0	–	5	–	0	0	–	10	–	0
$ – Conference champion

The 1937 Cincinnati Bearcats football team was an American football team that represented the University of Cincinnati as a member of the Buckeye Athletic Association during the 1937 college football season. The Bearcats were led by head coach Russ Cohen who went 0–5 before captain Wade Woodworth took over, also going 0–5 and compiled a 0–10 season record.

== Schedule ==
Date	Opponent	Site	Result	Attendance	Source
September 18	Morehead*	Nippert Stadium; Cincinnati, OH	L 0–7		
September 25	Western Reserve*	Nippert Stadium; Cincinnati, OH	L 6–32		
October 2	Butler*	Nippert Stadium; Cincinnati, OH	L 0–13		
October 9	at Dayton	Dayton Stadium; Dayton, OH	L 0–35	8,000	
October 16	Case*	Nippert Stadium; Cincinnati, OH	L 0–21		
October 23	at Indiana*	Memorial Stadium; Bloomington, IN	L 0–27		
October 30	at Ohio Wesleyan	Selby Field; Delaware, OH	L 6–20		
November 6	Ohio^{†}	Nippert Stadium; Cincinnati, OH	L 0–17		
November 13	at Marshall	Fairfield Stadium; Huntington, WV	L 0–28	6,000	
November 25	Miami (OH)	Nippert Stadium; Cincinnati, OH (Victory Bell)	L 6–14	10,000	
*Non-conference game; ^{†}Homecoming
