= 1937 Miami Redskins football team =

American college football season

1937 Miami Redskins football
- Conference: Buckeye Athletic Association
- Record: 4–4–1 (2–3 BAA)
- Head coach: Frank Wilton (6th season)
- Home stadium: Miami Field

1937 Buckeye Athletic Association football standings
	Conf.					Overall
Team	W		L		T	W		L		T
Marshall $	4	–	0	–	1	9	–	0	–	1
Dayton	4	–	1	–	0	7	–	2	–	0
Ohio	3	–	1	–	1	5	–	3	–	1
Miami (OH)	2	–	3	–	0	4	–	4	–	1
Ohio Wesleyan	1	–	4	–	0	2	–	7	–	0
Cincinnati	0	–	5	–	0	0	–	10	–	0
$ – Conference champion

The 1937 Miami Redskins football team was an American football team that represented Miami University as a member of the Buckeye Athletic Association (BAA) during the 1937 college football season. In their sixth season under head coach Frank Wilton, the Redskins compiled a 4–4–1 record (2–3 against conference opponents) and finished fourth out of six teams in the BAA.

== Schedule ==
Date	Opponent	Site	Result	Attendance	Source
September 25	Alma*	Miami Field; Oxford, OH	W 27–0		
October 2	Marietta	Miami Field; Oxford, OH	W 75–6	6,000	
October 9	Marshall	Miami Field; Oxford, OH	L 0–7	6,500	
October 16	at Ohio	Ohio Stadium; Athens, OH (rivalry)	L 0–19		
October 23	at Toledo*	University Stadium; Toledo, OH	L 7–13		
October 30	Case*	Miami Field; Oxford, OH	T 13–13		
November 6	Ohio Wesleyan^{†}	Miami Field; Oxford, OH	W 32–0	8,000	
November 13	at Dayton	University of Dayton Stadium; Dayton, OH	L 7–21		
November 20	at Cincinnati	Nippert Stadium; Cincinnati, OH (Victory Bell)	W 14–6	10,000	
*Non-conference game; ^{†}Homecoming
