= Edson Rupp =

American football player and coach (1889–1960)

Biographical details
- Born: October 10, 1889; Marion, Ohio, U.S.
- Died: February 8, 1960 (aged 70); Granville, Ohio, U.S.

Playing career
- 1910–1912: Denison

Coaching career (HC unless noted)
- 1928–1930: Denison

Head coaching record
- Overall: 8–16–1

Edson Coldren "Babe" Rupp Sr. (October 10, 1889 – February 8, 1960) was an American college football player and coach. He served as the head football coach at Denison University from 1928 to 1930, compiling a record of 8–16–1.

== Head coaching record ==
Year	Team	Overall	Conference	Standing	Bowl/playoffs
Denison Big Red (Buckeye Athletic Association) (1928–1930)
1928	Denison	5–3	2–3	T–4th	
1929	Denison	1–6–1	0–4–1	T–5th	
1929	Denison	2–7	0–4	5th	
Denison:		8–16–1	2–11–1		
Total:		8–16–1			
