= 1931–32 Ohio Bobcats men's basketball team =

American college basketball season

1931–32 Ohio Bobcats men's basketball
- Conference: Buckeye Athletic Association
- Record: 11–10 (4–6 BAA)
- Head coach: Butch Grover (10th season)
- Home arena: Men's Gymnasium

The 1931–32 Ohio Bobcats men's basketball team represented Ohio University. Butch Grover was the head coach for Ohio. The Bobcats played their home games at the Men's Gymnasium. They finished the season 11–10 and 4–6 in the Buckeye Athletic Association.

== Schedule ==
| Date time, TV | Rank^{#} | Opponent^{#} | Result | Record | Site (attendance) city, state |
Regular Season
| * | | Bliss | L 30–32 | 0–1 | |
| * | | at Ohio State | L 18–24 | 0–2 | |
| * | | Westminster | W 29–24 | 1–2 | |
| * | | at Michigan State | L 15–29 | 1–3 | |
| * | | at Toledo | L 13–15 | 1–4 | |
| * | | at Wilmington | W 26–22 | 2–4 | |
| * | | Marietta | W 24–23 | 3–4 | |
| | | at DePauw | L 15–30 | 3–5 (0–1) | |
| | | Miami | L 22–25 | 3–6 (0–2) | |
| * | | Wabash | W 33–27 | 4–6 | |
| | | at Ohio Wesleyan | L 24–35 | 4–7 (0–3) | |
| | | at Wittenberg | W 37–28 | 5–7 (1–3) | |
| * | | at Marshall | W 28–26 | 6–7 | |
| * | | Muskingum | W 24–20 | 7–7 | |
| | | Cincinnati | W 42–24 | 8–7 (2–3) | |
| | | Ohio Wesleyan | L 33–37 | 8–8 (2–4) | |
| | | at Miami | L 28–32 | 8–9 (2–5) | |
| | | Wittenberg | W 36–34 | 9–9 (3–5) | |
| * | | at Marietta | W 34–26 | 10–9 | |
| | | at DePauw | W 29–26 | 11–9 (4–5) | |
| | | at Cincinnati | L 32–33 | 11–10 (4–6) | |
*Non-conference game. ^{#}Rankings from AP Poll. (#) Tournament seedings in parentheses. All times are in Eastern Time.
