= 1980–81 Ball State Cardinals men's basketball team =

American college basketball season

1980–81 Ball State Cardinals men's basketball

MAC Regular season co-champions MAC tournament champions

NCAA tournament
- Conference: Mid-American Conference
- Record: 20–10 (10–6 MAC)
- Head coach: Steve Yoder
- Home arena: Irving Gymnasium

1980–81 Mid-American Conference men's basketball standings
	Conf.				Overall
Team	W		L	PCT	W		L	PCT
Western Michigan	10	–	6	.625	15	–	13	.536
Ball State †	10	–	6	.625	20	–	10	.667
Toledo	10	–	6	.625	21	–	10	.677
Bowling Green	10	–	6	.625	15	–	12	.556
Northern Illinois	10	–	6	.625	17	–	12	.586
Eastern Michigan	8	–	8	.500	13	–	14	.481
Ohio	6	–	10	.375	7	–	20	.259
Miami	6	–	10	.375	11	–	15	.423
Central Michigan	5	–	11	.313	12	–	14	.462
Kent State	5	–	11	.313	7	–	19	.269
† 1981 MAC tournament winner Rankings from AP Poll

The 1980–81 Ball State Cardinals men's basketball team represented Ball State University as a member of the Mid-American Conference during the 1980–81 NCAA Division I men's basketball season. The Cardinals were led by head coach Steve Yoder and played their home games at Irving Gymnasium in Muncie, Indiana. After finishing in second place during the MAC regular season, Ball State won the MAC tournament to receive the conference's automatic bid to the NCAA tournament – the first appearance in program history. As No. 12 seed in the Mideast region, the Cardinals were beaten in a very competitive game by No. 5 seed Boston College in the opening round, 93–90. The team finished with a record of 20–10 (10–6 MAC).

== Roster ==
1980–81 Ball State Cardinals men's basketball team
Players	Coaches
Pos. / # / Name / Height / Weight / Year / Previous school / Hometown; G / / Ray McCallum / 5 ft 9 in (1.75 m) / — / So / / West Memphis, Arkansas	Head coach: Steve Yoder; Assistant coach(es) Legend: (C) Team captain; (S) Suspended; (I) Ineligible; (W) Walk-on; Injured; Current redshirt; Roster

== Schedule and results ==
Date time, TV	Rank^{#}	Opponent^{#}	Result	Record	Site city, state
Non-conference regular season
Nov 29, 1980*		at No. 5 Indiana	L 69–75	0–1	Assembly Hall; Bloomington, Indiana
Dec 9, 1980*		at Wisconsin	L 72–85	0–2	Wisconsin Field House; Madison, Wisconsin
Dec 13, 1980*		Indiana State	W 76–60	1–2	Irving Gymnasium; Muncie, Indiana
Dec 22, 1980*		at Bradley	L 73–106	1–3	Robertson Memorial Field House; Peoria, Illinois
Dec 27, 1980*		Nebraska	W 67–62	2–3	Irving Gymnasium; Muncie, Indiana
Jan 5, 1981*		at Butler	W 69–66	3–3	Hinkle Fieldhouse; Indianapolis, Indiana
MAC regular season
Feb 28, 1981		at Central Michigan	L 83–84	17–9 (10–6)	Rose Arena; Mount Pleasant, Michigan
MAC tournament
Mar 3, 1981*		Ohio; Quarterfinals	W 85–70	18–9	Irving Gymnasium; Muncie, Indiana
Mar 4, 1981*		vs. Toledo; Semifinals	W 79–77	19–9	Crisler Arena; Ann Arbor, Michigan
Mar 5, 1981*		vs. Northern Illinois; Championship game	W 79–66	20–9	Crisler Arena; Ann Arbor, Michigan
NCAA tournament
Mar 13, 1981*	(12 ME)	vs. (5 ME) Boston College; First round	L 90–93	20–10	Memorial Coliseum; Tuscaloosa, Alabama
*Non-conference game. ^{#}Rankings from AP Poll. (#) Tournament seedings in parentheses. All times are in Eastern Time Source.
