= 1924–25 Cincinnati Bearcats men's basketball team =

American college basketball season

1924–25 Cincinnati Bearcats men's basketball
- Conference: Ohio Athletic Conference
- Record: 5–14 (1–11 OAC)
- Head coach: Boyd Chambers (7th season)
- Captain: Clark Valentiner
- Home arena: Schmidlapp Gymnasium

1924–25 Ohio Athletic Conference men's basketball standings
	Conf.				Overall
Team	W		L	PCT	W		L	PCT
Mount Union	11	–	0	1.000	11	–	0	1.000
Ohio Wesleyan	12	–	1	.923	16	–	3	.842
Oberlin	8	–	1	.889	10	–	2	.833
Kenyon	11	–	2	.846	13	–	2	.867
Denison	10	–	3	.769	12	–	3	.800
Ohio	8	–	5	.615	12	–	6	.667
Akron	8	–	5	.615	8	–	5	.615
Wittenberg	7	–	5	.583	10	–	7	.588
Wooster	7	–	7	.500	8	–	7	.533
Hiram	5	–	6	.455	9	–	7	.563
Ohio Northern	3	–	6	.333	5	–	11	.313
Western Reserve	3	–	6	.333	3	–	9	.250
Baldwin-Wallace	3	–	7	.300	4	–	9	.308
Heidelberg	4	–	10	.286	4	–	10	.286
Miami (OH)	3	–	9	.250	3	–	10	.231
Otterbein	2	–	8	.200	2	–	8	.200
Case	2	–	9	.182	2	–	9	.182
Muskingum	1	–	8	.111	3	–	11	.214
Cincinnati	1	–	11	.083	5	–	14	.263

The 1924–25 Cincinnati Bearcats men's basketball team represented the University of Cincinnati during the 1924–25 NCAA men's basketball season. The head coach was Boyd Chambers, coaching his seventh season with the Bearcats. The team finished with an overall record of 5–14.

== Schedule ==
Date time, TV	Opponent	Result	Record	Site city, state
December 13	at Kentucky	L 23–28	0–1	Buell Armory Gymnasium; Lexington, KY
December 20	Louisville	W 29–18	1–1	Schmidlapp Gymnasium; Cincinnati, OH
December 22	National Dairy	W 29–15	2–1	Schmidlapp Gymnasium; Cincinnati, OH
December 29	Alumni	W 37–29	3–1	Schmidlapp Gymnasium; Cincinnati, OH
January 2	at Indiana	L 7–51	3–2	Men's Gymnasium; Bloomington, IN
January 3	Kentucky	W 24–20	4–2	Schmidlapp Gymnasium; Cincinnati, OH
January 9	Kenyon	L 20–21	4–3	Schmidlapp Gymnasium; Cincinnati, OH
January 10	at Ohio	L 27–34	4–4	Men's Gymnasium; Athens, OH
January 16	at Akron	L 12–26	4–5	Akron, OH
January 24	Ohio Wesleyan	L 19–42	4–6	Schmidlapp Gymnasium; Cincinnati, OH
January 31	Alumni	L 17–22	4–7	Schmidlapp Gymnasium; Cincinnati, OH
February 6	Oberlin	L 15–27	4–8	Schmidlapp Gymnasium; Cincinnati, OH
February 14	Dayton	L 25–26	4–9	Schmidlapp Gymnasium; Cincinnati, OH
February 21	at Ohio Northern	L 25–27	4–10	Ada, OH
February 27	Denison	L 21–33	4–11	Schmidlapp Gymnasium; Cincinnati, OH
March 3	at Denison	L 20–29	4–12	Granville, OH
March 7	Miami (OH)	L 29–30	4–13	Schmidlapp Gymnasium; Cincinnati, OH
March 10	at Heidelberg	W 21–20	5–13	Tiffin, OH
March 14	Miami (OH)	L 18–23	5–14	Oxford, OH
*Non-conference game. (#) Tournament seedings in parentheses.
