= 1936–37 Ohio Bobcats men's basketball team =

American college basketball season

1936–37 Ohio Bobcats men's basketball

BAA Co-Champions
- Conference: Buckeye Athletic Association
- Record: 18–3 (10–1 BAA)
- Head coach: Butch Grover (15th season)
- Home arena: Men's Gymnasium

The 1936–37 Ohio Bobcats men's basketball team represented Ohio University. Butch Grover was the head coach for Ohio. The Bobcats played their home games at the Men's Gymnasium. They finished the season 18–3 and won their third Buckeye Athletic Association championship with a conference record of 10–1.

== Schedule ==
Date time, TV	Rank^{#}	Opponent^{#}	Result	Record	Site (attendance) city, state
Regular Season
*		Bliss	W 55–20	1–0	
*		Glenville State	W 49–40	2–0	
*		Marietta	W 40–31	3–0	
*		at Western Reserve	L 42–43	3–1	
*		at Baldwin-Wallace	W 44–22	4–1	
*		at Akron Goodyear	L 21–32	4–2	
*		at Ohio Wesleyan	W 36–29	5–2	
		Cincinnati	W 39–34	6–2 (1–0)	
		at Miami	W 38–23	7–2 (2–0)	
		at Ohio Wesleyan	W 36–31	8–2 (3–0)	
*		Xavier	W 42–20	9–2	
		Dayton	W 35–27	10–2 (4–0)	
*		Case Tech	W 45–36	11–2	
		Ohio Wesleyan	W 43–23	12–2 (5–0)	
		at Dayton	W 44–18	13–2 (6–0)	
		Miami	L 14–21	10–6 (7–0)	
*		at Xavier	W 35–32	15–2 (8–0)	
		Marshall	W 40–32	16–2 (9–0)	
		at Marshall	L 33–36	16–3 (9–1)	
*		at Marietta	W 33–17	17–3	
		at Cincinnati	W 34–26	18–3 (10–1)	
*Non-conference game. ^{#}Rankings from AP Poll. (#) Tournament seedings in parentheses. All times are in Eastern Time.
