= Steve Yoder =

American former college basketball coach (born c. 1939)

Biographical details
- Born: November 1, 1939 (age 86)

Playing career

Basketball
- c. 1960: Illinois Wesleyan

Baseball
- 1959–1962: Illinois Wesleyan

Coaching career (HC unless noted)

Basketball
- 1962–1964: Glen Ellyn JH (IL) (assistant)
- 1964–1967: Plymouth HS (IN) (assistant)
- 1967–1973: Plymouth HS (IN)
- 1973–1975: Furman (assistant)
- 1975–1976: Penn HS (IN)
- 1976–1977: Ball State (assistant)
- 1977–1982: Ball State
- 1982–1992: Wisconsin
- 2014–2017: Houston (dir. of operations)

Administrative career (AD unless noted)
- 2000–2003: Indiana Pacers (scout)
- 2003–2011: New York Knicks (scout)

Head coaching record
- Overall: 205–227 (college)
- Tournaments: 0–1 (NCAA Division I); 2–2 (NIT)

Accomplishments and honors

Championships
- 2 MAC regular season (1981, 1982); MAC tournament (1981)

Awards
- 2× MAC Coach of the Year (1981, 1982)

Stephen Kent Yoder (born November 1, 1939) is an American former college basketball coach. He served as the head men's basketball coach at Ball State University from 1977 to 1982 and the University of Wisconsin–Madison from 1982 to 1992, compiling career college basketball coaching record of 205–227. Yoder most recently served as director of operations for the Houston Cougars men's basketball team.

== Early life ==
Yoder was born on 1 November 1939 in Plymouth, Indiana. He graduated from Plymouth High School in 1958. He attended then NAIA-member Illinois Wesleyan University on a basketball and baseball scholarship winning four letters in baseball and two in basketball before graduating in 1962. He received his master's degree from University of Saint Francis, then called Saint Francis College, in Fort Wayne, Indiana in 1970.

== Career ==
He started his coaching career at Glen Ellyn, Illinois junior high school, and in 1965 took an assistant's position in basketball at Plymouth High School. He became head coach at Plymouth in 1967 and led the school to three conference titles, three sectional crowns, a pair of regional titles, and two finishes among the top ten teams in state rankings over a six-year period. Yoder was named Indiana's District One Coach of the Year in 1973 and he then accepted a job as assistant coach at Furman University. He returned to Indiana in 1975 as head coach at Mishawaka's Penn High School. He then became assistant basketball coach at Ball State University in 1976 and a year later became head coach at the school.

Yoder was head coach at Ball State from 1977–78 to 1981–82, compiling a record of 77–62. He was named the Mid-American Conference Coach of the Year for both the 1980–81 and 1981–82 seasons. The 1980–81 Ball State team shared the MAC title with three other schools and gained an NCAA tournament berth by winning the conference's post-season tournament. Ball State compiled an overall 17–11 record during the 1981–82 season including a 12–4 conference record that gave them the MAC championship. The Cardinals lost to Northern Illinois University 79–75 in overtime in the MAC post-season tournament title game with the winner advancing to the NCAA meet.

In 1982, he left for University of Wisconsin–Madison, where he coached the Badgers until 1992. He compiled a record of 128–165 and led the Badgers to the National Invitation Tournament in 1988–89 and 1990–91 – the Badgers' first postseason appearances in over 40 years. For his accomplishments in coaching the 18–12 NIT team in 1988–89, Yoder was named Kodak District XI Coach of the Year by the National Association of Basketball Coaches as well as Midwest Coach of the Year by Basketball Times. Yoder was forced to resign in February 1992, effective after the season.

After coaching, he became a scout with the Indiana Pacers and later the New York Knicks.

== Awards ==
Yoder is a member of the Ball State University Hall of Fame (2001) and the Indiana Basketball Hall of Fame (2020).

== Head coaching record ==
=== College ===
Record table
Season	Team	Overall	Conference	Standing	Postseason
Ball State Cardinals (Mid-American Conference) (1977–1982)
1977–78	Ball State	10–15	6–10	T–7th	
1978–79	Ball State	16–11	9–7	4th	
1979–80	Ball State	14–15	7–9	T–4th	
1980–81	Ball State	20–10	10–6	T–1st	NCAA Division I first round
1981–82	Ball State	17–11	12–4	1st	
Ball State:		77–62	44–36		
Wisconsin Badgers (Big Ten Conference) (1982–1992)
1982–83	Wisconsin	8–20	3–15	10th	
1983–84	Wisconsin	8–20	4–14	10th	
1984–85	Wisconsin	14–14	5–13	9th	
1985–86	Wisconsin	12–16	4–14	9th	
1986–87	Wisconsin	14–17	4–14	8th	
1987–88	Wisconsin	12–16	6–12	7th	
1988–89	Wisconsin	18–12	8–10	6th	NIT second round
1989–90	Wisconsin	14–17	4–14	T–8th	
1990–91	Wisconsin	15–15	8–10	7th	NIT second round
1991–92	Wisconsin	13–18	4–14	9th	
Wisconsin:		128–165	50–130		
Total:		205–227			
National champion Postseason invitational champion Conference regular season champion Conference regular season and conference tournament champion Division regular season champion Division regular season and conference tournament champion Conference tournament champion
