= 1938 Dayton Flyers football team =

American college football season

1938 Dayton Flyers football

BAA co-champion
- Conference: Buckeye Athletic Association
- Record: 7–2 (3–1 BAA)
- Head coach: Harry Baujan (16th season)
- Home stadium: University of Dayton Stadium

1938 Buckeye Athletic Association football standings
| | Conf. | | | | | Overall |
| Team | W | | L | | T | W | | L | | T |
|---|---|---|---|---|---|---|---|---|---|---|
| Dayton + | 3 | – | 1 | – | 0 | 7 | – | 2 | – | 0 |
| Ohio + | 3 | – | 1 | – | 0 | 7 | – | 2 | – | 0 |
| Marshall | 2 | – | 2 | – | 0 | 5 | – | 4 | – | 0 |
| Miami (OH) | 1 | – | 3 | – | 0 | 6 | – | 3 | – | 0 |
| Ohio Wesleyan | 1 | – | 3 | – | 0 | 1 | – | 9 | – | 0 |
+ – Conference co-champions

The 1938 Dayton Flyers football team was an American football team that represented the University of Dayton as a member of the Buckeye Athletic Association during the 1938 college football season. In its 16th season under head coach Harry Baujan, the team compiled a 7–2 record.

== Schedule ==
| Date | Opponent | Site | Result | Attendance | Source |
|---|---|---|---|---|---|
| September 23 | Wittenberg* | University of Dayton Stadium; Dayton, OH | W 38–0 | | |
| September 30 | Georgetown (KY)* | University of Dayton Stadium; Dayton, OH | W 45–0 | | |
| October 8 | at Cincinnati* | Nippert Stadium; Cincinnati, OH | W 26–7 | | |
| October 15 | Toledo* | University of Dayton Stadium; Dayton, OH | W 17–13 | | |
| October 22 | at Miami (OH) | Miami Field; Oxford, OH | L 0–14 | | |
| October 29 | Marshall | University of Dayton Stadium; Dayton, OH | W 13–7 | 12,000 | |
| November 5 | Xavier*^{†} | University of Dayton Stadium; Dayton, OH | L 7–14 | 10,506 | |
| November 12 | Ohio | University of Dayton Stadium; Dayton, OH | W 13–0 | | |
| November 24 | Ohio Wesleyan | University of Dayton Stadium; Dayton, OH | W 25–0 | 5,500 | |
*Non-conference game; ^{†}Homecoming
