= 1979–80 Toledo Rockets men's basketball team =

American college basketball season

1979–80 Toledo Rockets men's basketball

MAC champions

NCAA Tournament
- Conference: Mid-American Conference
- Record: 23–6 (14–2 Mid-American)
- Head coach: Bob Nichols
- Assistant coach: Greg Kampe (2nd season)
- Home arena: Centennial Hall

1979–80 Mid-American Conference men's basketball standings
	Conf.				Overall
Team	W		L	PCT	W		L	PCT
Toledo †	14	–	2	.875	23	–	6	.793
Bowling Green State	11	–	5	.688	20	–	10	.667
Northern Illinois	9	–	7	.563	16	–	13	.552
Kent State	7	–	9	.438	16	–	11	.593
Ball State	7	–	9	.438	14	–	15	.483
Miami (Ohio)	7	–	9	.438	9	–	18	.333
Eastern Michigan	7	–	9	.438	11	–	16	.407
Western Michigan	7	–	9	.438	12	–	14	.462
Central Michigan	6	–	10	.375	12	–	13	.480
Ohio	5	–	11	.313	8	–	18	.308
† 1980 MAC tournament winner Rankings from AP Poll

The 1979–80 Toledo Rockets men's basketball team represented University of Toledo as a member of the Mid-American Conference during the 1979–80 NCAA Division I men's basketball season. The team was led by head coach Bob Nichols and played their home games at Centennial Hall in Toledo, Ohio. Toledo won the MAC championship, finishing three games ahead of the field, and reached the NCAA Tournament for the second consecutive season (only time in program history), and finished with a record of 23–6 (14–2 MAC).

As of the 2022–23 season, this marks the most recent appearance in the NCAA tournament for the Toledo men's basketball program.

== Roster ==
1979–80 Toledo Rockets men's basketball team
Players
Coaches

Pos.	#	Name	Height	Weight	Year	Hometown
F		Dick Miller	6 ft 6 in (1.98 m)	215 lb (98 kg)	Sr	Milwaukee, Wisconsin
C		Jim Swaney	6 ft 7 in (2.01 m)	—	Sr

Head coach

- Bob Nichols

Assistant coach(es)

- Greg Kampe

Legend

- (C) Team captain
- (S) Suspended
- (I) Ineligible
- (W) Walk-on
- Injured
- Current redshirt

== Schedule ==
Date time, TV	Rank^{#}	Opponent^{#}	Result	Record	Site city, state
Regular season
Dec 1, 1979*		at Charlotte	L 60–64	0–1	Charlotte Coliseum; Charlotte, North Carolina
Dec 3, 1979*		UMass	W 84–74	1–1	John F. Savage Hall; Toledo, Ohio
Dec 5, 1979*		Michigan	W 67–64	2–1	John F. Savage Hall; Toledo, Ohio
Dec 8, 1979		Northern Illinois	W 67–58	3–1 (1–0)	John F. Savage Hall; Toledo, Ohio
Dec 15, 1979*		Cal Poly	W 83–60	4–1	John F. Savage Hall; Toledo, Ohio
Dec 18, 1979*		vs. No. 5 Indiana	L 56–80	4–2	Market Square Arena; Indianapolis, Indiana
Dec 22, 1979*		at Butler	W 76–66	5–2	Hinkle Fieldhouse; Indianapolis, Indiana
Dec 28, 1979*		Northwestern	W 74–69	6–2	John F. Savage Hall; Toledo, Ohio
Dec 29, 1979*		Washington	L 70–71	6–3	John F. Savage Hall; Toledo, Ohio
Jan 2, 1980*		Charleston	W 82–75	7–3	John F. Savage Hall; Toledo, Ohio
Jan 5, 1980		Kent State	W 81–65	8–3 (2–0)	John F. Savage Hall; Toledo, Ohio
Jan 9, 1980		at Ohio	W 69–62	9–3 (3–0)	Convocation Center; Athens, Ohio
Jan 12, 1980		at Central Michigan	W 115–88	10–3 (4–0)	Rose Arena; Mount Pleasant, Michigan
Jan 16, 1980		Ball State	W 72–60	11–3 (5–0)	John F. Savage Hall; Toledo, Ohio
Jan 19, 1980		at Bowling Green State	L 71–74	11–4 (5–1)	Anderson Arena; Bowling Green, Ohio
Jan 23, 1980*		Miami (OH)	W 69–64	12–4 (6–1)	John F. Savage Hall; Toledo, Ohio
Jan 26, 1980		at Eastern Michigan	W 81–68	13–4 (7–1)	Bowen Field House; Ypsilanti, Michigan
Jan 29, 1980*		Dayton	W 76–75	14–4	John F. Savage Hall; Toledo, Ohio
Feb 2, 1980		Western Michigan	W 87–68	15–4 (8–1)	John F. Savage Hall; Toledo, Ohio
Feb 4, 1980		at Northern Illinois	W 73–70	16–4 (9–1)	Chick Evans Fieldhouse; DeKalb, Illinois
Feb 6, 1980		Ohio	W 75–62	17–4 (10–1)	John F. Savage Hall; Toledo, Ohio
Feb 9, 1980		at Kent State	L 73–83	17–5 (10–2)	Memorial Athletic and Convocation Center; Kent, Ohio
Feb 13, 1980		at Miami (OH)	W 75–72	18–5 (11–2)	Millett Hall; Oxford, Ohio
Feb 16, 1980		Central Michigan	W 85–65	19–5 (12–2)	John F. Savage Hall; Toledo, Ohio
Feb 20, 1980		at Ball State	W 102–73	20–5 (13–2)	Irving Gymnasium; Muncie, Indiana
Feb 23, 1980		Bowling Green State	W 71–69	21–5 (14–2)	John F. Savage Hall; Toledo, Ohio
MAC Tournament
Feb 27, 1980*		vs. Ball State; Semifinals	W 91–83	22–5	Crisler Arena; Ann Arbor, Michigan
Feb 28, 1980*		vs. Bowling Green State; Championship game	W 85–70	23–5	Crisler Arena; Ann Arbor, Michigan
NCAA Tournament
Mar 7, 1980*		vs. Florida State; First round	L 91–94	23–6	E. A. Diddle Arena; Bowling Green, Kentucky
*Non-conference game. ^{#}Rankings from AP Poll. (#) Tournament seedings in parentheses. ME=Mideast.

== Awards and honors ==
- Jim Swaney – MAC Player of the Year
