= 1932–33 Ohio Bobcats men's basketball team =

American college basketball season

1932–33 Ohio Bobcats men's basketball

BAA Champions
- Conference: Buckeye Athletic Association
- Record: 16–4 (7–3 BAA)
- Head coach: Butch Grover (11th season)
- Home arena: Men's Gymnasium

The 1932–33 Ohio Bobcats men's basketball team represented Ohio University. Butch Grover was the head coach for Ohio. The Bobcats played their home games at the Men's Gymnasium. They finished the season 16–4 and won their second Buckeye Athletic Association championship with a record of 7–3.

== Schedule ==
Date time, TV	Rank^{#}	Opponent^{#}	Result	Record	Site (attendance) city, state
Regular Season
*		Bliss	W 38–22	1–0	
*		Wilmington	W 41–29	2–0	
*		at Akron Goodyear	L 34–41	2–1	
*		at Western Reserve	W 47–30	3–1	
*		at East Liverpool	W 50–27	4–1	
*		at Zanesville Pros	W 46–40	5–1	
*		Marietta	W 41–19	6–1	
		Miami	W 47–27	7–1 (1–0)	
		Ohio Wesleyan	L 32–34	7–2 (1–1)	
		at Denison	L 23–24	7–3 (1–2)	
		at Cincinnati	W 32–28 ^{OT}	8–3 (2–2)	
*		at Marshall	W 35–23	9–3	
		at Wittenberg	L 32–37	9–4 (2–3)	
		Ohio Wesleyan	W 34–29	10–4 (3–3)	
*		Marshall	W 42–21	11–4	
		Miami	W 38–18	12–4 (4–3)	
		Denison	W 42–21	13–4 (5–3)	
*		at Marietta	W 32–29	14–4	
		Wittenberg	W 44–32	15–4 (6–3)	
		Cincinnati	W 31–19	16–4 (7–3)	
*Non-conference game. ^{#}Rankings from AP Poll. (#) Tournament seedings in parentheses. All times are in Eastern Time.
