= Bob Nichols (basketball) =

American basketball player and coach (1930–2013)

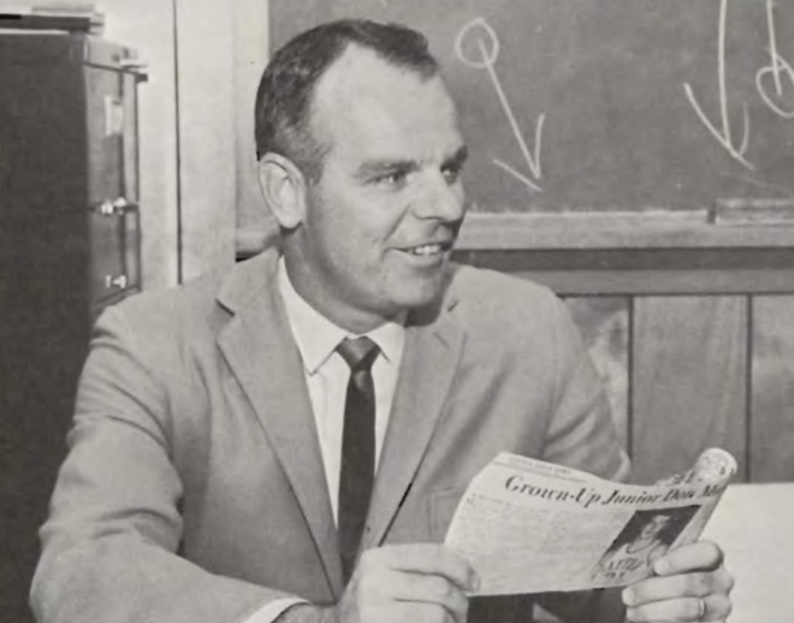
- Nichols from the 1967 Blockhouse

Biographical details
- Born: July 10, 1930; Grand Haven, Michigan, U.S.
- Died: March 30, 2013 (aged 82); Toledo, Ohio, U.S.

Playing career
- 1950–1953: Toledo

Coaching career (HC unless noted)
- 1956–1963: Central Catholic HS
- 1963–1964: Bowling Green (assistant)
- 1964–1965: Toledo (assistant)
- 1965–1987: Toledo
- 1989–1994: Eckerd (women’s)

Head coaching record
- Overall: 377–211 (.641) (men's); 34–96 (.262) (women's); 111–39 (.740) (high school)
- Tournaments: 1–3 (NCAA); 1–1 (NIT); 1–1 (CCAT)

Accomplishments and honors

Championships
- 5 MAC regular season (1967, 1972, 1979–1981); MAC tournament (1980)

Awards
- 3× MAC Coach of the Year (1974, 1979, 1980)

Robert J. Nichols (July 10, 1930 – March 30, 2013) was an American college basketball coach. He was known for his tenure as the head men’s coach for the University of Toledo.

Nichols was born in Grand Haven, Michigan, and raised in Jackson, Michigan. He played college basketball for Toledo from 1950 to 1953. He was hired as head coach for Central Catholic High School in Toledo in 1956, and in seven seasons as head coach compiled a record of 111–39. He then entered the college coaching ranks, first as an assistant at Bowling Green, and then was hired as an assistant coach at his alma mater in 1964. Nichols was promoted to head coach after head coach Ed Melvin resigned following the 1964–65 season.

He coached Toledo for 22 seasons, compiling a record of 377 and 211. His teams won five Mid-American Conference (MAC) championships and the 1980 MAC tournament title. Nichols compiled twenty consecutive winning seasons, but resigned in 1987 after consecutive losing seasons.

Nichols returned to coaching in 1989, where he first accepted the head coach position at Lake–Sumter Community College, but then reversed course and accepted the head women’s job at Eckerd College. Nichols coached at Eckerd for five seasons, resigning to take care of his wife after she was in a serious car accident.

Nichols died in Toledo on March 30, 2013, at age 82.

== Head coaching record ==
=== Men's ===
Record table
Season	Team	Overall	Conference	Standing	Postseason
Toledo Rockets (Mid-American Conference) (1965–1987)
1965–66	Toledo	13–11	8–4	2nd	
1966–67	Toledo	23–2	11–1	1st	NCAA University Division First Round
1967–68	Toledo	16–8	8–4	3rd	
1968–69	Toledo	13–11	5–7	5th	
1969–70	Toledo	15–9	5–5	4th	
1970–71	Toledo	13–11	4–6	T–4th	
1971–72	Toledo	18–7	7–3	T–1st	
1972–73	Toledo	15–11	7–5	T–2nd	
1973–74	Toledo	19–9	8–4	2nd	CCAT Semifinals
1974–75	Toledo	17–9	9–5	T–2nd	
1975–76	Toledo	18–7	13–3	3rd	
1976–77	Toledo	21–6	12–4	3rd	
1977–78	Toledo	21–6	11–5	T–2nd	
1978–79	Toledo	22–8	13–3	T–1st	NCAA Division I Sweet 16
1979–80	Toledo	23–6	14–2	1st	NCAA Division I First Round
1980–81	Toledo	21–10	10–6	T–1st	NIT Second Round
1981–82	Toledo	15–11	7–9	8th	
1982–83	Toledo	17–12	10–8	T–3rd	
1983–84	Toledo	18–11	11–7	T–3rd	
1984–85	Toledo	16–12	11–7	T–3rd	
1985–86	Toledo	12–17	8–10	5th	
1986–87	Toledo	11–17	4–12	T–8th	
Toledo:		377–211 (.641)	196–120 (.620)		
Total:		377–211 (.641)			
National champion Postseason invitational champion Conference regular season champion Conference regular season and conference tournament champion Division regular season champion Division regular season and conference tournament champion Conference tournament champion

=== Women's ===
Record table
Season	Team	Overall	Conference	Standing	Postseason
Eckerd Tritons (Sunshine State Conference) (1989–1994)
1989–90	Eckerd	9–15	4–8	4th	
1990–91	Eckerd	3–24	0–12	7th	
1991–92	Eckerd	7–20	4–8	4th	
1992–93	Eckerd	7–19	4–8	5th	
1993–94	Eckerd	8–18	5–9	5th	
Eckerd:		34–96 (.262)	17–45 (.274)		
Total:		34–96 (.262)			
