= 1974–75 Ohio Bobcats men's basketball team =

American college basketball season

1974–75 Ohio Bobcats men's basketball
- Conference: Mid-American Conference
- Record: 12–14 (4–10 MAC)
- Head coach: Dale Bandy (1st season)
- Assistant coach: Bill Brown (1st season)
- Home arena: Convocation Center

1974–75 Mid-American Conference men's basketball standings
| | Conf. | | | | Overall |
| Team | W | | L | PCT | W | | L | PCT |
|---|---|---|---|---|---|---|---|---|
| Central Michigan | 10 | – | 4 | .714 | 22 | – | 6 | .786 |
| Toledo | 9 | – | 5 | .643 | 17 | – | 9 | .654 |
| Bowling Green State | 9 | – | 5 | .643 | 18 | – | 10 | .643 |
| Miami (Ohio) | 8 | – | 5 | .615 | 19 | – | 7 | .731 |
| Western Michigan | 8 | – | 6 | .571 | 16 | – | 10 | .615 |
| Eastern Michigan | 4 | – | 9 | .308 | 12 | – | 14 | .462 |
| Ohio | 4 | – | 10 | .286 | 12 | – | 14 | .462 |
| Kent State | 3 | – | 11 | .214 | 6 | – | 20 | .231 |
Rankings from AP Poll

The 1974–75 Ohio Bobcats men's basketball team represented Ohio University as a member of the Mid-American Conference in the college basketball season of 1974–75. The team was coached by Dale Bandy in his first at Ohio. Bandy was promoted from assistant when long time coach Jim Snyder retired. They played their home games at Convocation Center. The Bobcats finished with a record of 12–14 and seventh in the MAC regular season with a conference record of 4–10.

== Schedule ==
| Date time, TV | Rank^{#} | Opponent^{#} | Result | Record | Site (attendance) city, state |
Regular Season
| 11/30/1974* | | at Wisconsin | L 62–71 | 0–1 | |
| 12/3/1974* | | Cleveland State | W 85–71 | 1–1 | |
| 12/7/1974* | | at Northwestern | L 68–71 | 1–2 | |
| 12/14/1974* | | at Ohio State | L 87–96 | 1–3 | |
| 12/21/1974* | | at Florida State | L 60–67 | 1–4 | |
| 12/23/1974* | | at South Florida | W 73–63 | 2–4 | |
| 12/28/1974* | | San Francisco State | W 75–59 | 3–4 | |
| 12/30/1974* | | at Loyola (IL) | W 75–63 | 4–4 | |
MAC regular season
| 1/4/1975 | | Kent State | W 68–53 | 5–4 (1–0) | |
| 1/7/1975* | | Missouri | W 78–65 | 6–4 | |
| 1/11/1975 | | at Toledo | L 56–80 | 6–5 (1–1) | |
| 1/15/1975 | | Miami (OH) | W 92–90 ^{2OT} | 7–5 (2–1) | |
| 1/18/1975 | | at Western Michigan | L 66–71 | 7–6 (2–2) | |
| 1/22/1975 | | at Eastern Michigan | L 71–73 | 7–7 (2–3) | |
| 1/25/1975 | | Central Michigan | W 75–68 | 8-7 (3-3) | |
| 1/29/1975 | | at Bowling Green | W 75–69 | 9-7 (4-3) | |
| 2/1/1975 | | at Kent State | L 69–74 | 9–8 (4–4) | |
| 2/8/1975 | | Toledo | L 74–82 | 9–9 (4–5) | |
| 2/11/1975* | | at Ball State | W 82–74 | 10–9 | |
| 2/15/1975 | | Western Michigan | L 72–76 | 10–10 (4–6) | |
| 2/17/1975* | | Fairfield | W 80–61 | 11–10 | |
| 2/22/1975 | | at Central Michigan | L 88–117 | 11–11 (4–7) | |
| 2/26/1975 | | Bowling Green | L 66–73 | 11–12 (4–8) | |
| 3/1/1975 | | Eastern Michigan | L 57–62 | 11–13 (4–9) | |
| 3/4/1975* | | Penn State | W 79–71 | 12–13 | |
| 3/8/1975 | | at Miami (OH) | L 80–81 | 12–14 (4–10) | |
*Non-conference game. ^{#}Rankings from AP Poll. (#) Tournament seedings in parentheses. All times are in Eastern Time.

== Statistics ==
=== Team statistics ===
Final 1974–75 statistics

| Record | Ohio | OPP |
|---|---|---|
| Scoring | 1913 | 1901 |
| Scoring Average | 73.58 | 73.12 |
| Field goals – Att | 756–1683 | 787–1685 |
| Free throws – Att | 401–554 | 327–464 |
| Rebounds | 1010 | 992 |
| Assists | | |
| Turnovers | | |
| Steals | | |
| Blocked Shots | | |

=== Player statistics ===
| | | | Minutes | | Scoring | | Total FGs | | | Free-Throws | | | Rebounds | | | | | | |
| Player | GP | GS | Tot | Avg | Pts | Avg | FG | FGA | Pct | FT | FTA | Pct | Tot | Avg | A | PF | TO | Stl | Blk |
|---|---|---|---|---|---|---|---|---|---|---|---|---|---|---|---|---|---|---|---|
| Walter Luckett | 26 | - | | | 657 | 25.3 | 257 | 490 | 0.524 | 143 | 191 | 0.749 | 136 | 5.2 | | 68 | | | |
| Total | 26 | - | - | - | 1913 | 73.6 | 756 | 1683 | 0.449 | 401 | 554 | 0.724 | 1010 | 38.8 | | 525 | | | |
| Opponents | 26 | - | - | - | 1901 | 73.1 | 787 | 1685 | 0.467 | 327 | 464 | 0.705 | 992 | 38.2 | | 533 | | | |

Legend
| GP | Games played | GS | Games started | Avg | Average per game |
| FG | Field-goals made | FGA | Field-goal attempts | Off | Offensive rebounds |
| Def | Defensive rebounds | A | Assists | TO | Turnovers |
| Blk | Blocks | Stl | Steals | High | Team high |
