= 1927–28 Ohio Bobcats men's basketball team =

American college basketball season

1927–28 Ohio Bobcats men's basketball
- Conference: Buckeye Athletic Association
- Record: 10–10 (4–6 BAA)
- Head coach: Butch Grover (6th season)
- Home arena: Men's Gymnasium

The 1927–28 Ohio Bobcats men's basketball team represented Ohio University. Butch Grover was the head coach for Ohio. The Bobcats played their home games at the Men's Gymnasium. They finished 10–10 and 4–6 in the Buckeye Athletic Association.

== Schedule ==
Date time, TV	Rank^{#}	Opponent^{#}	Result	Record	Site (attendance) city, state
Regular Season
*		Bliss	W 44–17	1–0	
*		Marietta	W 40–22	2–0	
*		at Hamilton YMCA	W 35–30	3–0	
*		at Cincinnati YMCA	L 21–40	3–1	
*		at Manchester	L 17–39	3–2	
*		at Manchester	L 18–38	3–3	
		at Cincinnati	L 27–28	3–4 (0–1)	
*		Muskingum	L 19–54	3–5	
		Ohio Wesleyan	L 32–41	3–6 (0–2)	
*		Centre	W 39–23	4–6	
		at Denison	W 31–22	5–6 (1–2)	
		Miami	W 36–22	6–6 (2–2)	
		at Wittenberg	L 36–52	6–7 (2–3)	
		at Ohio Wesleyan	L 29–30	6–8 (2–4)	
*		at Marietta	W 53–16	7–8	
		Wittenberg	W 41–37	8–8 (3–4)	
		at Miami	L 32–51	8–9 (3–5)	
		Cincinnati	W 46–33	9–9 (4–5)	
*		at Muskingum	W 40–36	10–9	
		Denison	L 34–36	10–10 (4–6)	
*Non-conference game. ^{#}Rankings from AP Poll. (#) Tournament seedings in parentheses. All times are in Eastern Time.
