= Butch Grover =

American basketball coach

Biographical details
- Education: Ohio University

Coaching career (HC unless noted)
- 1922–1938: Ohio

Head coaching record
- Overall: 192–129

Brandon T. "Butch" Grover was an American former college basketball coach. He graduated from Ohio University in 1919. He joined the coaching staff at Ohio after he graduated. He was the head coach of the men's basketball team from 1922 through 1938 and is third on the school's list of all-time coaching wins. He led the Bobcats to three Buckeye Athletic Association championships in the 1930s. After retiring from coaching be authored a book on the by-laws of 12 different sports which was subsequently used by many universities. Grover Center on the Ohio University campus in Athens, Ohio as well as a heath lecture series at Ohio are named in his honor.

== Head coaching record ==
Record table
Season	Team	Overall	Conference	Standing	Postseason
Ohio Green and White (Independent) (1922–1926)
1922–23	Ohio	11–8			
1923–24	Ohio	16–5			
1924–25	Ohio	13–6			
1925–26	Ohio	15–9			
Ohio Bobcats (Buckeye Athletic Association) (1926–1938)
1926–27	Ohio	8–13	3–7		
1927–28	Ohio	10–10	4–6		
1928–29	Ohio	10–10	3–7		
1929–30	Ohio	12–9	4–4		
1930–31	Ohio	12–4	7–1	1st	
1931–32	Ohio	11–10	5–5		
1932–33	Ohio	16–4	7–3	1st	
1933–34	Ohio	5–14	2–6		
1934–35	Ohio	11–9	5–5		
1935–36	Ohio	13–7	7–3		
1936–37	Ohio	18–3	10–1	1st	
1937–38	Ohio	11–8	4–6		
Ohio:		192–129 (.598)			
Total:		192–129 (.598)			
National champion Postseason invitational champion Conference regular season champion Conference regular season and conference tournament champion Division regular season champion Division regular season and conference tournament champion Conference tournament champion
