= 1976–77 Ohio Bobcats men's basketball team =

American college basketball season

1976–77 Ohio Bobcats men's basketball
- Conference: Mid-American Conference
- Record: 9–17 (4–12 MAC)
- Head coach: Dale Bandy (3rd season)
- Assistant coach: Bill Brown (3rd season)
- Home arena: Convocation Center

1976–77 Mid-American Conference men's basketball standings
	Conf.				Overall
Team	W		L	PCT	W		L	PCT
Central Michigan	13	–	3	.813	18	–	10	.643
Miami (Ohio)	13	–	3	.813	20	–	6	.769
Toledo	12	–	4	.750	21	–	6	.778
Northern Illinois	10	–	6	.625	13	–	14	.481
Western Michigan	8	–	8	.500	14	–	13	.519
Ball State	7	–	9	.438	11	–	14	.440
Bowling Green State	5	–	11	.313	9	–	18	.333
Ohio	4	–	12	.250	9	–	17	.346
Eastern Michigan	4	–	12	.250	9	–	18	.333
Kent State	4	–	12	.250	8	–	19	.296
Rankings from AP Poll

The 1976–77 Ohio Bobcats men's basketball team represented Ohio University as a member of the Mid-American Conference in the college basketball season of 1976–77. The team was coached by Dale Bandy in his third season at Ohio. They played their home games at Convocation Center. The Bobcats finished with a record of 9–17 and eighth in the MAC regular season with a conference record of 4–12.

== Schedule ==
Date time, TV	Rank^{#}	Opponent^{#}	Result	Record	Site (attendance) city, state
Regular Season
12/1/1976*		Pittsburgh	W 72–62	1–0	
12/4/1976*		Northwestern	L 71–73	1–1	
12/11/1976*		Marietta	W 85–72	2–1	
12/18/1976*		at Cleveland State	W 93–83	3–1	
12/22/1976		Eastern Michigan	W 91–81	4–1 (1–0)	
12/27/1976*		at Oklahoma City; All-College Tournament	L 73–97	4–2	The Myriad; Oklahoma City, OK
12/29/1976*		vs. St. Joseph's (PA); All-College Tournament	L 62–67	4–3	The Myriad; Oklahoma City, OK
12/30/1976*		vs. Tulane; All-College Tournament	W 93–67	5–3	The Myriad; Oklahoma City, OK
MAC regular season
1/5/1977		at Toledo	L 66–82	5–4 (1–1)	
1/8/1977		Northern Illinois	L 65–81	5–5 (1–2)	
1/12/1977*		at Marshall	L 71–79	5–6	
1/15/1977		at Kent State	L 74–77	5–7 (1–3)	
1/19/1977		Ball State	L 63–66	5–8 (1–4)	
1/22/1977		at Miami (OH)	L 78–84	5-9 (1-5)	
1/26/1977		Western Michigan	W 80–74	6-9 (2-5)	
2/2/1977		at Ball State	L 64–65	6–10 (2-6)	
2/5/1977		at Bowling Green	W 69–68 ^{OT}	7–10 (3–6)	
2/7/1977*		at Loyola (IL)	L 73–74	7–11	
2/9/1977		Toledo	L 74–75	7–12 (3–7)	
2/12/1977		at Northern Illinois	L 70–77	7–13 (3–8)	
2/16/1977*		Virginia Tech	W 82–77	8–13	
2/19/1977		Kent State	W 81–80	9–13 (4–8)	
2/26/1977		Miami (OH)	L 62–83	9–14 (4–9)	
3/2/1977		at Western Michigan	L 63–75	9–15 (4–10)	
3/5/1977		at Eastern Michigan	L 75–80	9–16 (4–11)	
3/7/1977		Central Michigan	L 64–76	9–17 (4–12)	
*Non-conference game. ^{#}Rankings from AP Poll. (#) Tournament seedings in parentheses. All times are in Eastern Time.

== Statistics ==
=== Team statistics ===
Final 1976–77 statistics

Record	Ohio	OPP
Scoring	1914	1975
Scoring Average	73.62	75.96
Field goals – Att	731–1705	800–1648
Free throws – Att	452–623	375–550
Rebounds	958	1105
Assists		
Turnovers		
Steals		
Blocked Shots		

=== Player statistics ===
			Minutes		Scoring		Total FGs			Free-Throws			Rebounds						
Player	GP	GS	Tot	Avg	Pts	Avg	FG	FGA	Pct	FT	FTA	Pct	Tot	Avg	A	PF	TO	Stl	Blk
Steve Skaggs	25	-			482	19.3	190	395	0.481	102	143	0.713	178	7.1		57			
Bucky Walden	25	-			338	13.5	125	282	0.443	88	129	0.682	107	4.3		73			
Tim Joyce	18	-			326	18.1	128	300	0.427	70	95	0.737	119	6.6		60			
Ernie Whitus	20	-			205	10.3	79	178	0.444	47	68	0.691	111	5.6		61			
Kim Leonard	11	-			150	13.6	67	174	0.385	16	20	0.800	24	2.2		31			
Bill Littlefield	24	-			119	5.0	50	117	0.427	19	31	0.613	67	2.8		57			
Bob Leon	26	-			108	4.2	29	88	0.330	50	55	0.909	46	1.8		68			
Cliff Sawyer	23	-			88	3.8	29	76	0.382	30	39	0.769	52	2.3		37			
Mike Borden	24	-			37	1.5	10	30	0.333	17	26	0.654	67	2.8		49			
John Kimbel	10	-			23	2.3	7	17	0.412	9	11	0.818	17	1.7		8			
Mark Lauretti	9	-			20	2.2	9	27	0.333	2	3	0.667	5	0.6		9			
Total	26	-	-	-	1914	73.6	731	1705	0.429	452	623	0.726	958	36.8		544			
Opponents	26	-	-	-	1975	76.0	800	1648	0.485	375	550	0.682	1105	42.5		563			

Legend
GP	Games played	GS	Games started	Avg	Average per game
FG	Field-goals made	FGA	Field-goal attempts	Off	Offensive rebounds
Def	Defensive rebounds	A	Assists	TO	Turnovers
Blk	Blocks	Stl	Steals	High	Team high
