= 1980 MAC men's basketball tournament =

- Classification: Division I
- Season: 1979–80
- Teams: 7
- First round site: Campus Arenas; Campus Sites
- Finals site: Crisler Center; Ann Arbor, MI
- Champions: Toledo (1st title)
- Winning coach: Bob Nichols (1st title)
- MVP: Jim Swaney (Toledo)
- MAC men's basketball tournaments

1979–80 Mid-American Conference men's basketball standings
	Conf.				Overall
Team	W		L	PCT	W		L	PCT
Toledo †	14	–	2	.875	23	–	6	.793
Bowling Green State	11	–	5	.688	20	–	10	.667
Northern Illinois	9	–	7	.563	16	–	13	.552
Kent State	7	–	9	.438	16	–	11	.593
Ball State	7	–	9	.438	14	–	15	.483
Miami (Ohio)	7	–	9	.438	9	–	18	.333
Eastern Michigan	7	–	9	.438	11	–	16	.407
Western Michigan	7	–	9	.438	12	–	14	.462
Central Michigan	6	–	10	.375	12	–	13	.480
Ohio	5	–	11	.313	8	–	18	.308
† 1980 MAC tournament winner Rankings from AP Poll

The 1980 MAC men's basketball tournament was held February 26–28 at a combination of on-campus gymnasiums and the Crisler Center in Ann Arbor, Michigan. This was the first edition of the tournament.

Top-seeded Toledo defeated Bowling Green in the inaugural championship game, 85–70, to win their first MAC men's basketball tournament.

The Rockets, in turn, received a bid to the 1980 NCAA tournament. They were the only MAC program invited to the tournament.

== Format ==
First Round games were played at the home court of the higher-seeded team. All remaining games (semifinals, third-place final, and championship) were played at the Crisler Center in Ann Arbor, Michigan.

== Bracket ==
First round Tuesday, February 26
5	Ball State	73
4	Kent State	71
3	Northern Illinois	58
6	Miami (OH)	53
7	Eastern Michigan	49
2	Bowling Green	54

Semifinals; Wednesday, February 27
1	Toledo	91
5	Ball State	83
3	Northern Illinois	63
2	Bowling Green	78

Championship; Thursday, February 28
1	Toledo	85
2	Bowling Green	70
Third Place; Thursday, February 28
3	Northern Illinois	71
5	Ball State	58
