= 1930–31 Ohio Bobcats men's basketball team =

American college basketball season

1930–31 Ohio Bobcats men's basketball

BAA Champions
- Conference: Buckeye Athletic Association
- Record: 12–4 (7–1 BAA)
- Head coach: Butch Grover (9th season)
- Home arena: Men's Gymnasium

The 1930–31 Ohio Bobcats men's basketball team represented Ohio University. Butch Grover was the head coach for Ohio. The Bobcats played their home games at the Men's Gymnasium. They finished the season 12–4. They won their first Buckeye Athletic Association championship with a record of 7–1.

== Schedule ==
Date time, TV	Rank^{#}	Opponent^{#}	Result	Record	Site (attendance) city, state
Regular Season
*		Bliss	W 36–20	1–0	
*		Cornell	L 33–38	1–1	
*		at DePauw	L 26–32	1–2	
*		Broasddus	W 31–22	2–2	
*		Marietta	W 17–12	3–2	
		at Ohio Wesleyan	L 20–26	3–3 (0–1)	
		Denison	L 27–35 ^{2OT}	3–4 (1–1)	
		Miami	W 21–19	4–4 (2–1)	
*		at Muskingum	W 28–26	5–4	
*		at Marshall	W 42–37	6–4	
		at Cincinnati	W 28–22	7–4 (3–1)	
		Ohio Wesleyan	W 30–28	8–4 (4–1)	
		at Miami	W 23–18	9–4 (5–1)	
		Cincinnati	W 32–14	10–4 (6–1)	
*		Muskingum	W 40–32	11–4	
		at Denison	W 28–17	12–4 (7–1)	
*Non-conference game. ^{#}Rankings from AP Poll. (#) Tournament seedings in parentheses. All times are in Eastern Time.
