= 1979–80 Bowling Green Falcons men's basketball team =

American college basketball season

1979–80 Bowling Green Falcons men's basketball

National Invitation Tournament, First Round
- Conference: Mid-American Conference
- Record: 20–10 (11–5 Mid-American)
- Head coach: John Weinert (4th season)
- Home arena: Anderson Arena

1979–80 Mid-American Conference men's basketball standings
	Conf.				Overall
Team	W		L	PCT	W		L	PCT
Toledo †	14	–	2	.875	23	–	6	.793
Bowling Green State	11	–	5	.688	20	–	10	.667
Northern Illinois	9	–	7	.563	16	–	13	.552
Kent State	7	–	9	.438	16	–	11	.593
Ball State	7	–	9	.438	14	–	15	.483
Miami (Ohio)	7	–	9	.438	9	–	18	.333
Eastern Michigan	7	–	9	.438	11	–	16	.407
Western Michigan	7	–	9	.438	12	–	14	.462
Central Michigan	6	–	10	.375	12	–	13	.480
Ohio	5	–	11	.313	8	–	18	.308
† 1980 MAC tournament winner Rankings from AP Poll

The 1979–80 Bowling Green Falcons men's basketball team represented Bowling Green State University during the 1979–80 men's college basketball season.

== Schedule ==
Date time, TV	Rank^{#}	Opponent^{#}	Result	Record	Site city, state
December 1*		Baldwin-Wallace	W 77–58	1–0	Anderson Arena; Bowling Green, Ohio
December 4*		at Duquesne	L 42–72	1–1	Civic Arena; Pittsburgh, Pennsylvania
December 8		Ball State	W 80–79	2–1	Anderson Arena; Bowling Green, Ohio
December 10*		Defiance	W 89–75	3–1	Anderson Arena; Bowling Green, Ohio
December 15*		Northwestern State	W 64–54	4–1	Anderson Arena; Bowling Green, Ohio
December 17*		at Valparaiso	W 60–59	5–1	Hilltop Gym; Valparaiso, Indiana
December 28*		vs. Washington	L 62–92	5–2	John F. Savage Hall; Toledo, Ohio
December 29*		vs. Northwestern	W 79–68	6–2	John F. Savage Hall; Toledo, Ohio
January 5		Western Michigan	W 70–65	7–2 (1–0)	Anderson Arena; Bowling Green, Ohio
January 9		at Miami (OH)	L 61–62	7–3 (1–1)	Millett Hall; Oxford, Ohio
January 12		at Ohio	W 72–50	8–3 (2–1)	Convocation Center; Athens, Ohio
January 14*		George Mason	W 95–70	9–3 (3–1)	Anderson Arena; Bowling Green, Ohio
January 16		Central Michigan	W 69–62	10–3 (4–1)	Anderson Arena; Bowling Green, Ohio
January 19		Toledo	W 74–71	11–3 (5–1)	Anderson Arena; Bowling Green, Ohio
January 23		at Eastern Michigan	W 67–63	12–3 (6–1)	Convocation Center; Ypsilanti, Michigan
January 26		Northern Illinois	W 71–68	13–3 (7–1)	Anderson Arena; Bowling Green, Ohio
January 28		at Kent State	W 80–66	14–3 (8–1)	Memorial Athletic and Convocation Center; Kent, Ohio
January 30*		at Butler	W 77–68	15–3 (8–1)	Hinkle Fieldhouse; Indianapolis, IN
February 4		at Ball State	W 79–78	16–3 (9–1)	Irving Gymnasium; Muncie, IN
February 6		Miami (OH)	W 64–61	17–3 (10–1)	Anderson Arena; Bowling Green, Ohio
February 9		at Western Michigan	L 60–79	17–4 (10–2)	University Arena; Kalamazoo, Michigan
February 11*		at Loyola (IL)	L 85–88	17–5 (10–2)	Alumni Gym; Chicago, Illinois
February 13		Eastern Michigan	L 67–79	17–6 (10–3)	Anderson Arena; Bowling Green, Ohio
February 16		Ohio	W 91–82	18–6 (11–3)	Anderson Arena; Bowling Green, Ohio
February 20		at Central Michigan	L 72–75	18–7 (11–4)	McGuirk Arena; Mount Pleasant, Michigan
February 23		at Toledo	L 69–71	18–8 (11–5)	John F. Savage Hall; Toledo, Ohio
MAC Tournament
February 26		Eastern Michigan	W 54–49	19–8 (11–5)	Anderson Arena; Bowling Green, Ohio
February 27		vs. Northern Illinois	W 78–63	20–8 (11–5)	Crisler Arena; Ann Arbor, Michigan
February 28		vs. Toledo	L 70–85	20–9 (11–5)	Crisler Arena; Ann Arbor, Michigan
NIT
March 5*		at Minnesota; First Round	L 50–64	20–10 (11–5)	Williams Arena; Minneapolis, Minnesota
*Non-conference game. ^{#}Rankings from AP Poll. (#) Tournament seedings in parentheses.
