= 1937–38 Ohio Bobcats men's basketball team =

American college basketball season

1937–38 Ohio Bobcats men's basketball
- Conference: Buckeye Athletic Association
- Record: 12–8 (4–6 BAA)
- Head coach: Butch Grover (16th season)
- Home arena: Men's Gymnasium

The 1937–38 Ohio Bobcats men's basketball team represented Ohio University. Butch Grover was the head coach in his final season for Ohio. The Bobcats played their home games at the Men's Gymnasium. They finished the season 12–8 and 4–6 in the Buckeye Athletic Association.

== Schedule ==
| Date time, TV | Rank^{#} | Opponent^{#} | Result | Record | Site (attendance) city, state |
Regular Season
| * | | Bliss | W 54–47 | 1–0 | |
| * | | Washington & Jefferson | W 38–35 | 2–0 | |
| * | | Marietta | W 35–31 | 3–0 | |
| | | at Cincinnati | L 37–42 | 3–1 | |
| * | | Xavier | W 39–33 | 4–1 | |
| * | | at Toledo | W 54–48 | 5–1 | |
| | | Ohio Wesleyan | W 57–36 | 6–1 | |
| | | at Dayton | W 32–29 | 7–1 | |
| | | Cincinnati | W 40–35 | 8–1 | |
| * | | at Ohio State | L 40–47 | 8–2 | |
| | | Dayton | W 46–38 | 9–2 | |
| * | | at Marietta | L 34–35 | 9–3 | |
| | | at Miami | L 33–36 | 9–4 | |
| | | Marshall | L 21–22 | 9–5 | |
| | | at Ohio Wesleyan | L 33–35 | 9–6 | |
| * | | at Xavier | L 27–47 | 9–7 | |
| | | Miami | W 44–31 | 10–7 | |
| * | | at Case Tech | W 46–42 | 11–7 | |
| * | | Muskingum | W 50–18 | 12–7 | |
| | | at Marshall | L 32–44 | 12–8 | |
*Non-conference game. ^{#}Rankings from AP Poll. (#) Tournament seedings in parentheses. All times are in Eastern Time.
