= 1938 Ohio Bobcats football team =

American college football season

1938 Ohio Bobcats football

BAA co-champion
- Conference: Buckeye Athletic Association
- Record: 7–2 (3–1 BAA)
- Head coach: Don Peden (15th season)
- Home stadium: Ohio Stadium

1938 Buckeye Athletic Association football standings
	Conf.					Overall
Team	W		L		T	W		L		T
Dayton +	3	–	1	–	0	7	–	2	–	0
Ohio +	3	–	1	–	0	7	–	2	–	0
Marshall	2	–	2	–	0	5	–	4	–	0
Miami (OH)	1	–	3	–	0	6	–	3	–	0
Ohio Wesleyan	1	–	3	–	0	1	–	9	–	0
+ – Conference co-champions

The 1938 Ohio Bobcats football team was an American football team that represented Ohio University as a member of the Buckeye Athletic Association (BAA) during the 1938 college football season. In their 15th season under head coach Don Peden, the Bobcats compiled a 7–2 record (3–1 against conference opponents), tied for the BAA championship, and outscored opponents by a total of 161 to 89.

== Schedule ==
Date	Opponent	Site	Result	Attendance	Source
September 24	at Illinois*	Memorial Stadium; Champaign, IL	W 6–0	31,378	
September 30	at Xavier*	Xavier Stadium; Cincinnati, OH	W 14–12		
October 8	at Western Reserve*	League Park; Cleveland, OH	L 14–26		
October 15	at Ohio Wesleyan	Delaware, OH	W 28–0		
October 22	Wayne*	Ohio Stadium; Athens, OH	W 52–7		
October 29	Cincinnati*	Ohio Stadium; Athens, OH	W 13–12		
November 5	at Miami (OH)	Oxford, OH (rivalry)	W 20–12	9,000	
November 12	Dayton	University of Dayton Stadium; Dayton, OH	L 0–13		
November 19	Marshall	Ohio Stadium; Athens, OH (rivalry)	W 14–7		
*Non-conference game
