= Harry Baujan =

American football player and coach (1894–1976)

Biographical details
- Born: May 24, 1894; Beardstown, Illinois, U.S.
- Died: December 30, 1976 (aged 82); Dayton, Ohio, U.S.

Playing career

Football
- 1913–1916: Notre Dame
- 1920–1921: Cleveland Tigers/Indians
- Position: End

Coaching career (HC unless noted)

Football
- 1923–1946: Dayton

Basketball
- 1923–1928: Dayton

Head coaching record
- Overall: 124–64–8 (football); 46–38 (basketball)

Accomplishments and honors

Championships
- Football; 1 OAC (1933); 1 BAA (1938)
- College Football Hall of Fame; Inducted in 1990 (profile)

Harry Clifford "Blond Beast" Baujan (May 24, 1894 – December 30, 1976) was an American football player, coach of football and basketball, and college athletics administrator.

== Career ==
Baujan was born in Beardstown, Illinois. He played college football as an end at the University of Notre Dame. He also played two seasons (1920–1921) in the National Football League for the Cleveland Tigers/Indians. He served as the head football coach at the University of Dayton from 1923 to 1946, compiling a record of 124–64–8. Baujan was also head coach of Dayton Flyers men's basketball team between 1923 and 1928, and later served as the school's athletic director.

== Personal life and legacy ==
Baujan was married, and had a son. He died in 1976, at the age of 82, in Dayton. He was posthumously inducted into the College Football Hall of Fame as a coach in 1990. Baujan Field, the current home of the University of Dayton's men's and women's soccer teams, was named in Baujan's honor in 1961. The field served as the university's home football field since its construction in 1925, but has since been repurposed, undergoing several improvements.

== Head coaching record ==
=== Football ===
Year	Team	Overall	Conference	Standing	Bowl/playoffs
Dayton Flyers (Independent) (1923–1925)
1923	Dayton	4–5			
1924	Dayton	7–3			
1925	Dayton	7–2			
Dayton Flyers (Ohio Athletic Conference) (1926–1934)
1926	Dayton	8–2	3–0	2nd	
1927	Dayton	6–3	2–1	T–7th	
1928	Dayton	6–3	2–0	NA	
1929	Dayton	4–5	1–0	3rd	
1930	Dayton	4–3–2	2–0	NA	
1931	Dayton	5–3–2	0–0–1	T–10th	
1932	Dayton	9–2	1–1	T–11th	
1933	Dayton	7–2–1	3–0–1	1st	
1934	Dayton	4–3–1	0–0–1	6th	
Dayton Flyers (Buckeye Athletic Association) (1935–1938)
1935	Dayton	4–4–1	2–2–1	4th	
1936	Dayton	4–5	2–3	4th	
1937	Dayton	7–2	4–1	2nd	
1938	Dayton	7–2	3–1	T–1st	
Dayton Flyers (Independent) (1939–1946)
1939	Dayton	4–4–1			
1940	Dayton	6–3			
1941	Dayton	7–3			
1942	Dayton	8–2			
1943	No team—World War II				
1944	No team—World War II				
1945	No team—World War II				
1946	Dayton	6–3			
Dayton:		124–64–8	25–9–4		
Total:		124–64–8			
National championship Conference title Conference division title or championship game berth
