= 1922–23 Ohio Bobcats men's basketball team =

American college basketball season

1922–23 Ohio Bobcats men's basketball
- Conference: Ohio Athletic Conference
- Record: 11–8 (?–? OAC)
- Head coach: Butch Grover (1st season)
- Home arena: Ohio Gymnasium

The 1922–23 Ohio Bobcats men's basketball team represented Ohio University. Butch Grover was the head coach for Ohio. The Bobcats played their home games in Ohio Gymnasium.

== Schedule ==
Date time, TV	Rank^{#}	Opponent^{#}	Result	Record	Site (attendance) city, state
Regular Season
		Bliss	L 15–19	0–1	
		at Lancaster Petty Shoes	L 16–29	0–2	
		at Akron Firestone	L 12–22	0–3	
		at Geneva	W 43–24	1–3	
		at Canton Pure Oils	L 19–34	1–4	
		Cincinnati	W 18–17	2–4	
		Salem College (W. Va.)	W 22–21	3–4	
		Ohio Northern	W 27–26	4–4	
		at Xavier	L 15–35	4–5	
		at Cincinnati	L 26–27	4–6	
		at Western Reserve	W 28–22	5–6	
		at Oberlin	L 20–21	5–7	
		Xavier	L 17–18	5–8	
		at Marietta	W 29–14	6–8	
		St. Ignatius	W 36–20	7–8	
		Marietta	W 32–15	8–8	
		Otterbein	W 38–6	9–8	
		Western Reserve	W 41–30	10–8	
		at Wittenberg	W 41–27	11–8	
*Non-conference game. ^{#}Rankings from AP Poll. (#) Tournament seedings in parentheses. All times are in Eastern Time.
