= 1924–25 Ohio Bobcats men's basketball team =

American college basketball season

1924–25 Ohio Bobcats men's basketball
- Conference: Ohio Athletic Conference
- Record: 12–6 (8–5 OAC)
- Head coach: Butch Grover (3rd season)
- Home arena: Men's Gymnasium

1924–25 Ohio Athletic Conference men's basketball standings
	Conf.				Overall
Team	W		L	PCT	W		L	PCT
Mount Union	11	–	0	1.000	11	–	0	1.000
Ohio Wesleyan	12	–	1	.923	16	–	3	.842
Oberlin	8	–	1	.889	10	–	2	.833
Kenyon	11	–	2	.846	13	–	2	.867
Denison	10	–	3	.769	12	–	3	.800
Ohio	8	–	5	.615	12	–	6	.667
Akron	8	–	5	.615	8	–	5	.615
Wittenberg	7	–	5	.583	10	–	7	.588
Wooster	7	–	7	.500	8	–	7	.533
Hiram	5	–	6	.455	9	–	7	.563
Ohio Northern	3	–	6	.333	5	–	11	.313
Western Reserve	3	–	6	.333	3	–	9	.250
Baldwin-Wallace	3	–	7	.300	4	–	9	.308
Heidelberg	4	–	10	.286	4	–	10	.286
Miami (OH)	3	–	9	.250	3	–	10	.231
Otterbein	2	–	8	.200	2	–	8	.200
Case	2	–	9	.182	2	–	9	.182
Muskingum	1	–	8	.111	3	–	11	.214
Cincinnati	1	–	11	.083	5	–	14	.263

The 1924–25 Ohio Bobcats men's basketball team represented Ohio University. Butch Grover was the head coach for Ohio. The Bobcats played their home games at the Men's Gymnasium.

== Schedule ==
Date time, TV	Rank^{#}	Opponent^{#}	Result	Record	Site (attendance) city, state
Regular Season
		New Lexington	W 26–12	1–0	
		at Lancaster Shoes	L 19–21	1–1	
		Bliss	W 27–22	2–1	
		Cincinnati	W 34–27	3–1	
		at Ohio Wesleyan	L 30–40	3–2	
		Marietta	W 42–12	4–2	
		at Miami	W 34–20	5–2	
		Ohio Northern	W 48–23	6–2	
		Akron	W 40–26	7–2	
		Ohio Wesleyan	W 37–30	8–2	
		Denison	L 18–34	8–3	
		at Baldwin-Wallace	W 30–20	9–3	
		at Oberlin	L 13–31	9–4	
		Marietta	W 25–24	10–4	
		Kenyon	L 36–37	10–5	
		at Kenyon	L 29–30	10–6	
		Hiram	W 35–19	11–6	
		at Wittenberg	W 28–24	12–6	
*Non-conference game. ^{#}Rankings from AP Poll. (#) Tournament seedings in parentheses. All times are in Eastern Time.
