= 1925–26 Ohio Bobcats men's basketball team =

American college basketball season

1925–26 Ohio Bobcats men's basketball
- Conference: Ohio Athletic Conference
- Record: 15–9 ( OAC)
- Head coach: Butch Grover (4th season)
- Home arena: Men's Gymnasium

The 1925–26 Ohio Bobcats men's basketball team represented Ohio University. Butch Grover was the head coach for Ohio. The Bobcats played their home games at the Men's Gymnasium.

== Schedule ==
Date time, TV	Rank^{#}	Opponent^{#}	Result	Record	Site (attendance) city, state
Regular Season
		Mondmauk-Mills	L 18–23	0–1	
		Bliss	W 56–24	1–1	
		at Ohio State	L 33–37	1–2	
		Rio Grande	W 48–30	2–2	
		at Mansfield Pets	W 38–24	3–2	
		at Mansfield Lumbermen	W 44–41	4–2	
		at Bliss	W 38–28	5–2	
		at Nelsonville YMCA	W 50–29	6–2	
		Wittenberg	W 31–22	7–2	
		at Ohio Wesleyan	L 29–37	7–3	
		Miami	W 50–39	8–3	
		Denison	W 33–21	9–3	
		at Marietta	L 12–16	9–4	
		Cincinnati	L 27–29	9–5	
		at Wittenberg	L 32–33	9–6	
		Oberlin	W 28–21	10–6	
		Ohio Wesleyan	L 31–37	10–7	
		at Denison	W 24–17	11–7	
		Tennessee	W 50–30	12–7	
		at Miami	L 35–37	12–8	
		at Cincinnati	L 26–30	12–9	
		at Baldwin-Wallace	W 38–28	13–9	
		Marietta	W 46–19	14–9	
		at Akron	W 31–25	15–9	
*Non-conference game. ^{#}Rankings from AP Poll. (#) Tournament seedings in parentheses. All times are in Eastern Time.
