= Dale Bandy =

American basketball player-coach

Coaching career (HC unless noted)
- 1974–1980: Ohio

Head coaching record
- Overall: 69–89

Dale Bandy is a former American basketball player and coach. Playing for coach Jim Snyder at Ohio University, he was team captain of the 1960 team that made the Sweet Sixteen in the 1960 NCAA tournament. He was an assistant under Snyder, who led his teams to 7 NCAA tournament appearances (1960, 1961, 1964, 1965, 1970, 1972, and 1974) and one National Invitation Tournament appearance (1969). He succeeded Snyder as head coach of the Ohio Bobcats men's basketball team from the 1974–75 season to the 1979–80 season (six years). Coach Bandy's teams compiled a 69–89 record, good for a .436 winning percentage. His Mid-American Conference record was 36–58 (.382).

He was a graduate of Clay High School (Portsmouth, Ohio) where his father was a long-time administrator. While at Ohio he played baseball as well as basketball.

== Head coaching record ==
Record table
Season	Team	Overall	Conference	Standing	Postseason
Ohio Bobcats (Mid-American Conference) (1974–1980)
1974–75	Ohio	12–14	4–10	7th	
1975–76	Ohio	11–15	7–9	6th	
1976–77	Ohio	9–17	4–12	8th	
1977–78	Ohio	13–14	6–10	7th	
1978–79	Ohio	16–11	10–6	3rd	
1979–80	Ohio	8–18	5–11	10th	
Ohio:		69–89 (.437)	36–58 (.383)		
Total:		69–89 (.437)			
National champion Postseason invitational champion Conference regular season champion Conference regular season and conference tournament champion Division regular season champion Division regular season and conference tournament champion Conference tournament champion
