= 1981 MAC men's basketball tournament =

- Classification: Division I
- Season: 1980–81
- Teams: 7
- First round site: Campus Arenas; Campus Sites
- Finals site: Crisler Arena; Ann Arbor, MI
- Champions: Ball State (1st title)
- Winning coach: Steve Yoder (1st title)
- MVP: Ray McCallum (Ball State)
- MAC men's basketball tournaments

1980–81 Mid-American Conference men's basketball standings
	Conf.				Overall
Team	W		L	PCT	W		L	PCT
Western Michigan	10	–	6	.625	15	–	13	.536
Ball State †	10	–	6	.625	20	–	10	.667
Toledo	10	–	6	.625	21	–	10	.677
Bowling Green	10	–	6	.625	15	–	12	.556
Northern Illinois	10	–	6	.625	17	–	12	.586
Eastern Michigan	8	–	8	.500	13	–	14	.481
Ohio	6	–	10	.375	7	–	20	.259
Miami	6	–	10	.375	11	–	15	.423
Central Michigan	5	–	11	.313	12	–	14	.462
Kent State	5	–	11	.313	7	–	19	.269
† 1981 MAC tournament winner Rankings from AP Poll

The 1981 MAC men's basketball tournament was held March 3–5 at Crisler Arena in Ann Arbor, Michigan. Ball State defeated Northern Illinois in the championship game by the score of 79–66 to win their first MAC men's basketball tournament and a bid to the NCAA tournament. There they lost to Boston College in the first round. Ray McCallum of Central Michigan was named the tournament MVP.

== Format ==
Seven of the ten MAC teams participated. First Round games were played in the home arena of the higher seeded team. The semi-finals and final were played at Crisler Arena in Ann Arbor, Michigan.

== Bracket ==
Quarterfinals; March 3
5	Northern Illinois	79
4	Bowling Green	72
3	Toledo	95
6	Eastern Michigan	88
7	Ohio	70
2	Ball State	85

Semifinals; March 4
1	Western Michigan	73
5	Northern Illinois	75
3	Toledo	77
2	Ball State	79

Final; March 5
5	Northern Illinois	66
2	Ball State	79
Third place
3	Toledo	71
1	Western Michigan	65
