= 1980–81 Ohio Bobcats men's basketball team =

American college basketball season

1980–81 Ohio Bobcats men's basketball
- Conference: Mid-American Conference
- Record: 7–20 (6–10 MAC)
- Head coach: Danny Nee (1st season)
- Home arena: Convocation Center

1980–81 Mid-American Conference men's basketball standings
	Conf.				Overall
Team	W		L	PCT	W		L	PCT
Western Michigan	10	–	6	.625	15	–	13	.536
Ball State †	10	–	6	.625	20	–	10	.667
Toledo	10	–	6	.625	21	–	10	.677
Bowling Green	10	–	6	.625	15	–	12	.556
Northern Illinois	10	–	6	.625	17	–	12	.586
Eastern Michigan	8	–	8	.500	13	–	14	.481
Ohio	6	–	10	.375	7	–	20	.259
Miami	6	–	10	.375	11	–	15	.423
Central Michigan	5	–	11	.313	12	–	14	.462
Kent State	5	–	11	.313	7	–	19	.269
† 1981 MAC tournament winner Rankings from AP Poll

The 1980–81 Ohio Bobcats men's basketball team represented Ohio University as a member of the Mid-American Conference in the college basketball season of 1980–81. The team was coached by Danny Nee in his first season at Ohio. They played their home games at Convocation Center. The Bobcats finished with a record of 7–20 and seventh in the MAC with a conference record of 6–10. The 20 losses were the most in program history at the time.

== Schedule ==
Date time, TV	Rank^{#}	Opponent^{#}	Result	Record	Site (attendance) city, state
Regular Season
11/29/1980*		East Carolina	L 65–70	0–1	
12/6/1980*		at Cleveland State	L 57–83	0–2	
12/10/1980*		at West Virginia	L 61–69	0–3	
12/13/1980*		at Youngstown State	L 85–93	0–4	
12/20/1980*		at Canisius	L 47–59	0–5	
12/22/1980*		Marshall	L 59–65	0–6	Convocation Center; Athens, OH
12/26/1980*		at No. 18 Illinois; Fighting Illini Basketball Classic	L 54–84	0–7	
12/27/1980*		vs. Bradley; Fighting Illini Basketball Classic	L 56–84	0–8	
12/29/1980*		Charleston (WV)	L 42–49	0–9	
MAC regular season
1/7/1981*		at Northern Illinois	L 44–60	0–10	
1/10/1981		at Central Michigan	L 58–64	0–11 (0–1)	
1/14/1981		Bowling Green	W 78–63	1–11 (1–1)	
1/17/1981		at Eastern Michigan	L 57–62	1–12 (1–2)	
1/21/1981		Toledo	L 73–86	1-13 (1–2)	
1/24/1981		at Kent State	L 69–82	1-14 (1-4)	
1/26/1981*		UNC Wilmington	W 86–81	2–14	
1/28/1981		Ball State	W 75–68	3–14 (2–4)	
1/31/1981		at Miami (OH)	L 73–82	3–15 (2–5)	
2/4/1981		Western Michigan	W 79–74	4–15 (3–5)	
2/7/1981		Central Michigan	W 70–68	5–15 (4–5)	
2/11/1981		at Bowling Green	L 45–79	5–16 (4–6)	
2/14/1981		Eastern Michigan	L 58–68	5–17 (4–7)	
2/18/1981		at Toledo	L 67–95	5–18 (4–8)	
2/21/1981		Kent State	W 89–84	6–18 (5–8)	
2/25/1981		at Ball State	L 63–76	6–19 (5–9)	
MAC tournament
2/28/1981		Miami (OH)	W 78–72	7–19 (6–9)	
3/3/1981		at Ball State	L 70–85	7–20 (6–10)	
*Non-conference game. ^{#}Rankings from AP Poll. (#) Tournament seedings in parentheses. All times are in Eastern Time.

== Statistics ==
=== Team statistics ===
Final 1980–81 statistics

Record	Ohio	OPP
Scoring	1758	2005
Scoring Average	65.11	74.26
Field goals – Att	710–1619	768–1597
Free throws – Att	338–507	469–653
Rebounds	978	979
Assists		
Turnovers		
Steals		
Blocked Shots		

=== Player statistics ===
			Minutes		Scoring		Total FGs			Free-Throws			Rebounds						
Player	GP	GS	Tot	Avg	Pts	Avg	FG	FGA	Pct	FT	FTA	Pct	Tot	Avg	A	PF	TO	Stl	Blk
Tim Woodson	26		887	34.1	349	13.4	143	305	0.469	63	85	0.741	167	6.4	30	68	54	17	3
Kirk Lehman	27		936	34.7	324	12.0	118	255	0.463	88	112	0.786	53	2.0	103	79	70	29	0
Eric Hilton	27		783	29.0	253	9.4	94	193	0.487	65	95	0.684	68	2.5	79	51	78	28	3
John Devereaux	27		692	25.6	227	8.4	97	229	0.424	33	52	0.635	181	6.7	22	89	42	15	30
Jim Zalenka	27		562	20.8	176	6.5	75	194	0.387	26	41	0.634	74	2.7	18	78	30	22	2
Nate Cole	27		600	22.2	173	6.4	73	170	0.429	27	59	0.458	140	5.2	23	93	56	22	1
Sean Carlson	26		524	20.2	129	5.0	53	126	0.421	23	40	0.575	96	3.7	25	73	29	3	16
Mick Isgrigg	24		264	11.0	78	3.3	37	97	0.381	4	8	0.500	33	1.4	9	12	18	6	1
Willie Stevenson	16		75	4.7	20	1.3	9	22	0.409	2	4	0.500	3	0.2	6	12	13	3	0
James Towns	15		91	6.1	17	1.1	7	18	0.389	3	5	0.600	8	0.5	7	18	12	0	1
Dennis Dylewski	9			0.0	6	0.7	2	6	0.333	2	2	1.000	4	0.4					
Steve Becvar	2		14	7.0	4	2.0	1	2	0.500	2	3	0.667	4	2.0	2	1	1	1	0
Dave Mathews	2			0.0	2	1.0	1	2	0.500	0	1	0.000	4	2.0					
Total	27	-	-	-	1758	65.1	710	1619	0.439	338	507	0.667	978	36.2	0	584	0	0	0
Opponents	27	-		-	2005	74.3	768	1597	0.481	469	653	0.718	979	36.3		530			

Legend
GP	Games played	GS	Games started	Avg	Average per game
FG	Field-goals made	FGA	Field-goal attempts	Off	Offensive rebounds
Def	Defensive rebounds	A	Assists	TO	Turnovers
Blk	Blocks	Stl	Steals	High	Team high
