= 1979–80 Ohio Bobcats men's basketball team =

American college basketball season

1979–80 Ohio Bobcats men's basketball
- Conference: Mid-American Conference
- Record: 8–18 (5–11 MAC)
- Head coach: Dale Bandy (6th season)
- Home arena: Convocation Center

1979–80 Mid-American Conference men's basketball standings
| | Conf. | | | | Overall |
| Team | W | | L | PCT | W | | L | PCT |
|---|---|---|---|---|---|---|---|---|
| Toledo † | 14 | – | 2 | .875 | 23 | – | 6 | .793 |
| Bowling Green State | 11 | – | 5 | .688 | 20 | – | 10 | .667 |
| Northern Illinois | 9 | – | 7 | .563 | 16 | – | 13 | .552 |
| Kent State | 7 | – | 9 | .438 | 16 | – | 11 | .593 |
| Ball State | 7 | – | 9 | .438 | 14 | – | 15 | .483 |
| Miami (Ohio) | 7 | – | 9 | .438 | 9 | – | 18 | .333 |
| Eastern Michigan | 7 | – | 9 | .438 | 11 | – | 16 | .407 |
| Western Michigan | 7 | – | 9 | .438 | 12 | – | 14 | .462 |
| Central Michigan | 6 | – | 10 | .375 | 12 | – | 13 | .480 |
| Ohio | 5 | – | 11 | .313 | 8 | – | 18 | .308 |
† 1980 MAC tournament winner Rankings from AP Poll

The 1979–80 Ohio Bobcats men's basketball team represented Ohio University as a member of the Mid-American Conference in the college basketball season of 1979–80. The team was coached by Dale Bandy in his sixth and final season at Ohio. They played their home games at Convocation Center. The Bobcats finished with a record of 8–18 and last (10th) in the MAC regular season with a conference record of 5–11. The 18 losses were the most in program history at the time.

== Schedule ==
| Date time, TV | Rank^{#} | Opponent^{#} | Result | Record | Site (attendance) city, state |
Regular Season
| 12/1/1979* | | at No. 4 Ohio State | L 51–78 | 0–1 | |
| 12/3/1979* | | at St. Bonaventure | L 64–77 | 0–2 | |
| 12/5/1979* | | Canisius | W 87–82 ^{OT} | 1–2 | |
| 12/8/1979 | | Western Michigan | L 69–78 | 1–3 (0–1) | |
| 12/10/1979* | | at Marshall | L 61–76 | 1–4 | |
| 12/15/1979* | | West Virginia | W 69–61 | 2–4 | |
| 12/22/1979* | | Youngstown State | L 68–72 | 2–5 | |
| 12/28/1979* | | at Connecticut; Connecticut Classic | L 76–95 | 2–6 | |
| 12/29/1979* | | vs. Cal State Fullerton Titans; Connecticut Classic | L 49–71 | 2–7 | |
MAC regular season
| 1/5/1980 | | Central Michigan | L 50–83 | 2–8 (0–2) | |
| 1/7/1980* | | Cleveland State | W 76–75 | 3–8 | |
| 1/9/1980 | | Toledo | L 62–69 | 3–9 (0–3) | |
| 1/12/1980 | | Bowling Green | L 50–72 | 3–10 (0–4) | |
| 1/16/1980 | | at Eastern Michigan | L 65–67 | 3-11 (0–5) | |
| 1/19/1980 | | Northern Illinois | L 65–69 | 3-12 (0-6) | |
| 1/23/1980 | | at Kent State | L 76–85 | 3–13 (0-7) | |
| 1/26/1980 | | Ball State | W 75–74 | 4–13 (1–7) | |
| 1/28/1980* | | Virginia Tech | L 62–78 | 4–14 | |
| 1/30/1980 | | Kent State | W 67–57 | 5–14 (2–7) | |
| 2/2/1980 | | at Miami (OH) | L 67–71 | 5–15 (2–8) | |
| 2/6/1980 | | at Toledo | L 62–75 | 5–16 (2–9) | |
| 2/9/1980 | | Central Michigan | W 67–66 ^{OT} | 6–16 (3–9) | |
| 2/13/1980 | | at Western Michigan | W 56–50 | 7–16 (4–9) | |
| 2/16/1980 | | at Bowling Green | L 82–91 | 7–17 (4–10) | |
| 2/20/1980 | | Eastern Michigan | W 61–60 | 8–17 (5–10) | |
| 2/23/1980 | | at Northern Illinois | L 55–71 | 8–18 (5–11) | |
*Non-conference game. ^{#}Rankings from AP Poll. (#) Tournament seedings in parentheses. All times are in Eastern Time.

== Statistics ==
=== Team statistics ===
Final 1979–80 statistics

| Record | Ohio | OPP |
|---|---|---|
| Scoring | 1692 | 1906 |
| Scoring Average | 65.08 | 73.31 |
| Field goals – Att | 676–1571 | 731–1483 |
| Free throws – Att | 340–523 | 444–632 |
| Rebounds | 886 | 988 |
| Assists | 308 | 319 |
| Turnovers | | |
| Steals | 158 | 150 |
| Blocked Shots | 49 | 77 |

=== Player statistics ===
| | | | Minutes | | Scoring | | Total FGs | | | Free-Throws | | | Rebounds | | | | | | |
| Player | GP | GS | Tot | Avg | Pts | Avg | FG | FGA | Pct | FT | FTA | Pct | Tot | Avg | A | PF | TO | Stl | Blk |
|---|---|---|---|---|---|---|---|---|---|---|---|---|---|---|---|---|---|---|---|
| Kirk Lehman | 26 | - | 931 | 35.8 | 457 | 17.6 | 183 | 384 | 0.477 | 91 | 113 | 0.805 | 59 | 2.3 | 67 | 74 | | 29 | 1 |
| Spindle Graves | 26 | - | 759 | 29.2 | 315 | 12.1 | 107 | 265 | 0.404 | 101 | 156 | 0.647 | 138 | 5.3 | 91 | 101 | | 43 | 6 |
| Bill Littlefield | 25 | - | 635 | 25.4 | 198 | 7.9 | 82 | 201 | 0.408 | 34 | 46 | 0.739 | 84 | 3.4 | 60 | 74 | | 18 | 4 |
| Jim Zalenka | 22 | - | 499 | 22.7 | 174 | 7.9 | 69 | 149 | 0.463 | 36 | 53 | 0.679 | 93 | 4.2 | 18 | 41 | | 13 | 3 |
| Andre Adams | 25 | - | 651 | 26.0 | 137 | 5.5 | 55 | 132 | 0.417 | 27 | 44 | 0.614 | 115 | 4.6 | 10 | 75 | | 12 | 4 |
| John Patterson | 24 | - | 454 | 18.9 | 111 | 4.6 | 51 | 94 | 0.543 | 9 | 21 | 0.429 | 68 | 2.8 | 7 | 69 | | 5 | 13 |
| Tim Woodson | 25 | - | 376 | 15.0 | 96 | 3.8 | 38 | 79 | 0.481 | 20 | 40 | 0.500 | 51 | 2.0 | 16 | 30 | | 9 | 8 |
| Doug Graves | 26 | - | 416 | 16.0 | 89 | 3.4 | 41 | 100 | 0.410 | 7 | 12 | 0.583 | 74 | 2.8 | 4 | 46 | | 4 | 7 |
| Harold Moore | 25 | - | 373 | 14.9 | 76 | 3.0 | 33 | 117 | 0.282 | 10 | 27 | 0.370 | 66 | 2.6 | 28 | 44 | | 19 | 3 |
| Mick Isgrigg | 18 | - | 80 | 4.4 | 22 | 1.2 | 9 | 28 | 0.321 | 4 | 7 | 0.571 | 13 | 0.7 | 1 | 3 | | 3 | 0 |
| Tracy Poindexter | 9 | - | 77 | 8.6 | 17 | 1.9 | 8 | 22 | 0.364 | 1 | 4 | 0.250 | 17 | 1.9 | 6 | 15 | | 3 | 0 |
| Total | 26 | - | - | - | 1692 | 65.1 | 676 | 1571 | 0.430 | 340 | 523 | 0.650 | 886 | 34.1 | 308 | 572 | | 158 | 49 |
| Opponents | 26 | - | - | - | 1906 | 73.3 | 731 | 1483 | 0.493 | 444 | 632 | 0.703 | 988 | 38.0 | 319 | 497 | | 150 | 77 |

Legend
| GP | Games played | GS | Games started | Avg | Average per game |
| FG | Field-goals made | FGA | Field-goal attempts | Off | Offensive rebounds |
| Def | Defensive rebounds | A | Assists | TO | Turnovers |
| Blk | Blocks | Stl | Steals | High | Team high |
