= 1923–24 Ohio Bobcats men's basketball team =

American college basketball season

1923–24 Ohio Bobcats men's basketball
- Conference: Ohio Athletic Conference
- Record: 16–5 (9–3 OAC)
- Head coach: Butch Grover (2nd season)
- Home arena: Men's Gymnasium

1923–24 Ohio Athletic Conference men's basketball standings
	Conf.				Overall
Team	W		L	PCT	W		L	PCT
Mount Union	11	–	1	.917	12	–	1	.923
Baldwin-Wallace	8	–	1	.889	14	–	2	.875
Xavier	7	–	1	.875	12	–	4	.750
Denison	12	–	3	.800	13	–	3	.813
Ohio Wesleyan	12	–	3	.800	17	–	6	.739
Akron	9	–	3	.750	10	–	3	.769
Ohio	9	–	3	.750	16	–	5	.762
Cincinnati	10	–	4	.714	11	–	8	.579
Oberlin	6	–	4	.600	6	–	7	.462
Heidelberg	5	–	4	.556	6	–	6	.500
Western Reserve	7	–	6	.538	8	–	7	.533
Hiram	5	–	8	.385	6	–	9	.400
Ohio Northern	4	–	7	.364	8	–	7	.533
Wooster	4	–	9	.308	4	–	10	.286
Wittenberg	4	–	10	.286	4	–	13	.235
Kenyon	4	–	11	.267	4	–	12	.250
Miami (OH)	2	–	9	.182	2	–	9	.182
Muskingum	2	–	11	.154	6	–	11	.353
Case	1	–	13	.071	1	–	13	.071
Otterbein	0	–	11	.000	0	–	11	.000

The 1923–24 Ohio Bobcats men's basketball team represented Ohio University. Butch Grover was the head coach for Ohio. The Bobcats played their home games in the Men's Gymnasium.

== Schedule ==
Date time, TV	Rank^{#}	Opponent^{#}	Result	Record	Site (attendance) city, state
Regular Season
		Mondmauk-Mills	W 31–19	1–0	
		Bliss	W 38–16	2–0	
		at Canton Sinclair Oil	L 39–44	2–1	
		at Akron Firestone	W 30–24	3–1	
		at Dover All-Stars	L 29–33	3–2	
		at Marion Isley Dairy	W 31–16	4–2	
		Oberlin	W 34–32	5–2	
		at Marietta	W 27–24	6–2	
		at Xavier	L 31–32	6–3	
		at Cincinnati	W 21–18	7–3	
		at Denison	L 23–31	7–4	
		at Hiram	W 42–21	8–4	
		Xavier	W 26–15	9–4	
		Presbyterian (Tennessee)	W 56–33	10–4	
		at Ohio Northern	W 35–23	11–4	
		Wittenberg	W 30–21	12–4	
		at Ohio Wesleyan	L 20–22	12–5	
		Cincinnati	W 24–13	13–5	
		Marietta	W 37–22	14–5	
		Western Reserve	W 40–21	15–5	
		Ohio Wesleyan	W 28–27	16–5	
*Non-conference game. ^{#}Rankings from AP Poll. (#) Tournament seedings in parentheses. All times are in Eastern Time.
