= Bill Brown (basketball, born 1951) =

American basketball coach (1951–2023)

Biographical details
- Born: July 30, 1951; Toledo, Ohio, U.S.
- Died: February 15, 2023 (aged 71); Rostraver Township, Pennsylvania, U.S.

Playing career
- 1970–1974: Ohio

Coaching career (HC unless noted)
- 1974–1978: Ohio (assistant)
- 1978–1979: Kent State (assistant)
- 1980–1985: Arkansas (assistant)
- 1985–1987: Sacramento State
- 1987: Tennessee (assistant)
- 1988–1996: Kenyon
- 1996–2010: California (PA)

William Harris Brown (July 30, 1951 – February 15, 2023) was an American basketball coach at California University of Pennsylvania. He previously held the same position at California State University, Sacramento. and served as an assistant at multiple Division I institutions throughout his career.

William Harris “Bill” Brown, Kenyon’s head men’s basketball coach from 1988 to 1996, died Wednesday, Feb. 15, in Rostraver Township, Pennsylvania. He was 71 years old.
