= Buckeye Athletic Association =

Athletic league formed out of members of the Ohio Athletic Conference

- Formerly: Ohio Athletic Conference
- Founded: 1926
- Folded: 1939
- Sports fielded: Football Cross country Wrestling Basketball Baseball Track and field
- No. of teams: Ohio Wesleyan University; Miami University; University of Cincinnati; Denison University; Wittenberg University; Ohio University; Wabash College; DePauw University; Marshall College; University of Dayton; Western Michigan University; Xavier University
- Region: Ohio

The Buckeye Athletic Association, also known as the Buckeye Conference, was an athletic league formed out of members of the Ohio Athletic Conference. Its original membership in 1926 included Ohio Wesleyan University (Battling Bishops), Ohio University (Bobcats), Miami University (known then as the Big Reds, later the Redskins and currently the RedHawks), the University of Cincinnati (Bearcats), Denison University (Baptists, and later Big Red) and Wittenberg University (Lutherans, and later as Tigers). The Battling Bishops of OWU won the first title in football in 1926. The league was asked to end the membership in both the OAC and the Buckeye in 1928, at which time all the schools voted to instead leave their membership in the OAC behind and be only members of the Buckeye.

== Early years (1926–1934) ==
Wittenberg withdrew from membership in November 1929 on charges of using professional players after the Tigers won the football championship in 1927 and were co-champs with Ohio Wesleyan in 1928. However, Wittenberg returned to an affiliate membership in 1931, playing only Miami that year but with players named to the All-Conference lists from 1931 through the 1933 football, cross country and wrestling seasons and the 1934 basketball, baseball and track seasons.

In 1930, the Little Giants of Wabash College and the Tigers of DePauw University came from Indiana to add probationary teams to the league to add like schools to the mix. The Flyers of the University of Dayton were also considered, but there seemed to be resistance to the UD program from both Cincinnati and Miami. Both DePauw and Wabash, however, were out of the league after the 1932 football season, just as they were about to become full members of the league. That same year, the league also added the Thundering Herd of Marshall College (today Marshall University) for all sports but football for 1932–33, and the Herd began playing football as well in for the 1933 season.

Ohio's Bobcats dominated the league in football from start to finish, winning football titles in 1929, 1930, 1931, 1935, 1936 (co-champs with Miami), and 1938's last football title for the league. Miami won the football title in 1932, 1933 (co-champs with Cincinnati) and the co-championship with Ohio in 1936. The Bearcats won title in '33 with Miami - the long-time rivals who first began playing football in 1888 (a series Miami leads these days by 59 win to 52 for UC and 9 ties) - then won the title outright in 1934.

== Years of growth and controversy (1935–1937) ==
Finally, in 1935, the University of Dayton was added to the league and Marshall, which opened league play with a win in 1933 over Wittenberg in its first game, would then lose or tie the next 14 games in a row (1-13-1, 1933–35), but hired Coach Cam Henderson from Davis & Elkins College in 1935 to coach Herd basketball and football and act as director of athletics. Henderson was 4-6 in football that first year in '35, 0-5 in the Buckeye. By 1936, however, Marshall was 2-2-1 in the league and third behind Ohio (3-1-1) and Miami (2-1-1), declared co-champs with matching losses and ties. Marshall would win the title in 1937, won three baseball titles 1933-34-35 and three basketball titles in 1936-37, 1937–38 and 1938-39.

Complaints by Marshall about its treatment by the league and complaints about Marshall by many league members led to dissension within the league from about 1935-36 on. The unrest in the league led many to believe the league would not be around for the 1938 season, but after the 1938 spring league meetings, Western Michigan University (Kalamazoo, Michigan) and Xavier University (in Cincinnati, Ohio) were invited to join the league as probationary members, replacing Cincinnati who had made the decision to go independent in 1938. But as the Bobcats of Ohio were winning their league best sixth championship in November of '38, the league got together in December for annual winter meetings.

== The end of the conference (1939) ==
On December 10, 1938, the Buckeye Conference announced 1938-39 would be the final season the league would operate, a decision by all members schools - Dayton, Marshall, Miami, Ohio, and Ohio Wesleyan. While many at the time thought the league might reform at some point among the Ohio schools and possibly WMU, the United States' entry into World War II in December 1941 put any thoughts of rebuilding the Buckeye on the shelf.

== Evolution into the Mid-American Conference ==
Post-war, 1946, the idea of the Buckeye Conference was the template for the new Mid-American Conference, started that first year after the war. The five charter members of the Mid-American Conference were Ohio University, Butler University, the University of Cincinnati, Wayne University (now Wayne State University), and Western Reserve University – a school the Buckeye had tried, along with nearby Case Institute of Technology to get into the league on three occasions. Western Reserve would go on to be today's Case Western Reserve University, although the school left the MAC in 1955. Ohio is the only founding member of the MAC to still be a member.

Wayne University left after the first year, in 1947. Miami University and Western Michigan University, two members of the Buckeye at its demise, took the place of those charter members for the 1948 season. The MAC added the University of Toledo (in Ohio, in 1950), Kent State University (in Kent, Ohio in 1951), and Bowling Green State University (in Bowling Green, Ohio in 1952). The University of Cincinnati resigned its membership on February 18, 1953, with an effective date of June 1, 1953 of leaving the league.

Marshall College entered the league for all sports except football in 1953, playing its first season as a MAC football member in 1954. The Thundering Herd were a member of the league from 1953-69 - terminated by the league for violations in the football and basketball program unearthed in 1968, as Marshall got a one-year probation from the NCAA but never earn another hearing with the MAC in the early 1970s, eventually joining the Southern Conference in 1977. Marshall would rejoin the league in 1997 out of the SoCon and I-AA football (which the MAC was reclassified to by the NCAA in 1982, like the SoCon and a number of other like leagues, to which the MAC said "Thanks, but no thanks" to, remaining I-A through today), and the Herd would stay in the MAC until 2005, when Marshall joined the Conference USA with Central Florida, also in the MAC at that time.

The MAC went on to expand in a way the Buckeye Conference had first expanded, reaching into Wolverine State for Central Michigan University's Chippewas and Eastern Michigan University's Hurons (Eagles today) in 1972. The Cardinals of Ball State University from Muncie, Indiana and the Huskies of Northern Illinois University (Dekalb, near Chicago) were added in 1973 (although NIU left in 1986, then rejoined with Marshall in 1997). The University of Akron joined the MAC in 1992, and the State University of New York at Buffalo joined in 1998, with the Zips and Bulls both coming from I-AA. The MAC has also had football only members in the Knights from UCF in 2002, the Temple Owls in 2007 and the Minutemen of the University of Massachusetts in 2012, but all those schools left just a few years after joining.

== Member schools ==
The following colleges held membership in the Buckeye Athletic Association:

Institution	Location	Founded	Nickname	Joined	Left	Current conference
University of Cincinnati	Cincinnati, Ohio	1819	Bearcats	1926	1938	Big 12
University of Dayton	Dayton, Ohio	1850	Flyers	1935	1939	A-10 (all sports); PFL (football)
Denison University	Granville, Ohio	1831	Big Red	1926	1932	NCAC
DePauw University	Greencastle, Indiana	1837	Tigers	1930	1932	NCAC
Marshall College	Huntington, West Virginia	1837	Thundering Herd	1932	1939	Sun Belt
Miami University	Oxford, Ohio	1809	Redskins	1926	1939	MAC
Ohio University	Athens, Ohio	1804	Bobcats	1926	1939	MAC
Ohio Wesleyan University	Delaware, Ohio	1842	Battling Bishops	1926	1939	NCAC
Wabash College	Crawfordsville, Indiana	1832	Little Giants	1930	1932	NCAC
Western State Teachers College	Kalamazoo, Michigan	1903	Broncos	1938	1939	MAC
Wittenberg University	Springfield, Ohio	1845	Tigers	1926; 1931	1929; 1936	NCAC
Xavier University	Cincinnati, Ohio	1831	Musketeers	1938	1939	Big East

== Football champions ==
- 1926 – Ohio Wesleyan
- 1927 – Wittenberg
- 1928 – Ohio Wesleyan and Wittenberg
- 1929 – Ohio
- 1930 – Ohio
- 1931 – Ohio
- 1932 – Miami (OH)
- 1933 – Cincinnati and Miami (OH)
- 1934 – Cincinnati
- 1935 – Ohio
- 1936 – Miami (OH) and Ohio
- 1937 – Marshall
- 1938 – Dayton and Ohio

== See also ==
- List of defunct college football conferences
