= 1923–24 NCAA men's basketball season =

Men's collegiate basketball season

- Helms National Champions: North Carolina (retroactive selection in 1943)
- Player of the Year (Helms): Charlie T. Black, Kansas (retroactive selection in 1944)

The 1923–24 NCAA men's basketball season began in December 1923, progressed through the regular season and conference tournaments, and concluded in March 1924.

== Rule changes ==
A new rule required the player who was fouled to shoot his own free throws. Previously, a team could pick any player it wanted to shoot its free throws, and usually picked its best free-throw shooter to shoot all of them. The new rule thus brought to an end the practice of a team having a designated free-throw shooter.

== Season headlines ==
- North Carolina went undefeated, going 26-0, under coach Norman Shepard. The record included the 1924 Southern Conference men's basketball tournament.
- Butler won the annual Amateur Athletic Union basketball tournament — which included both collegiate and amateur non-collegiate teams — becoming the third of only four college teams to do so and the first to win the tournament since 1920.
- In February 1943, the Helms Athletic Foundation retroactively selected North Carolina as its national champion for the 1923–24 season.
- In 1995, the Premo-Porretta Power Poll retroactively selected North Carolina as its top-ranked team for the 1923–24 season.

== Conference membership changes ==
School	Former conference	New conference
Arkansas Razorbacks	Non-major basketball program	Southwest Conference
Maryland Terrapins	Non-major basketball program	Southern Conference
Sewanee Tigers	Independent	Southern Conference
TCU Horned Frogs	Independent	Southwest Conference
Western State Mountaineers	Non-major basketball program	Independent

== Regular season ==
=== Conferences ===
==== Conference winners and tournaments ====
Conference	Regular season winner	Conference player of the year	Conference tournament	Tournament venue (City)	Tournament winner
Big Ten Conference	Chicago, Illinois, & Wisconsin	None selected	No Tournament		
Eastern Intercollegiate Basketball League	Cornell	None selected	No Tournament		
Missouri Valley Intercollegiate Athletic Association	Kansas	None selected	No Tournament		
Pacific Coast Conference	Washington (North); California (South)		No Tournament; California defeated Washington in best-of-three conference championship playoff series		
Rocky Mountain Athletic Conference	Colorado College (Colorado); BYU (Utah)		No Tournament; Colorado College was conference champion		
Southern Conference	Tulane	None selected	1924 Southern Conference men's basketball tournament	Municipal Auditorium (Atlanta, Georgia)	North Carolina
Southwest Conference	Texas	None selected	No Tournament		

==== Conference standings ====
1923–24 Big Ten Conference men's basketball standings
	Conf.				Overall
Team	W		L	PCT	W		L	PCT
Wisconsin	8	–	4	.667	11	–	5	.688
Chicago	8	–	4	.667	11	–	6	.647
Illinois	8	–	4	.667	11	–	6	.647
Ohio State	7	–	5	.583	12	–	5	.706
Purdue	7	–	5	.583	12	–	5	.706
Indiana	7	–	5	.583	11	–	6	.647
Michigan	6	–	6	.500	10	–	7	.588
Minnesota	5	–	7	.417	9	–	8	.529
Iowa	4	–	8	.333	7	–	10	.412
Northwestern	0	–	12	.000	0	–	16	.000

1923–24 Eastern Intercollegiate Basketball League standings
	Conf.				Overall
Team	W		L	PCT	W		L	PCT
Cornell	8	–	2	.800	13	–	3	.813
Columbia	6	–	4	.600	15	–	4	.789
Princeton	6	–	4	.600	11	–	6	.647
Dartmouth	4	–	6	.400	12	–	9	.571
Penn	3	–	7	.300	18	–	8	.692
Yale	3	–	7	.300	12	–	10	.545

1923–24 Missouri Valley Intercollegiate Athletic Association men's basketball standings
	Conf.				Overall
Team	W		L	PCT	W		L	PCT
Kansas	15	–	1	.938	16	–	3	.842
Oklahoma	13	–	3	.813	15	–	3	.833
Nebraska	10	–	6	.625	11	–	7	.611
Washington University	8	–	8	.500	10	–	9	.526
Drake	8	–	8	.500	9	–	9	.500
Kansas State	8	–	8	.500	8	–	8	.500
Grinnell	4	–	12	.250	4	–	14	.222
Missouri	4	–	12	.250	4	–	14	.222
Iowa State	2	–	14	.125	2	–	16	.111

1923–24 Pacific Coast Conference men's basketball standings
	Conf.				Overall
Team	W		L	PCT	W		L	PCT
North
Washington	7	–	2	.778	12	–	4	.750
Oregon Agricultural	6	–	2	.750	20	–	5	.800
Oregon	4	–	4	.500	15	–	5	.750
Idaho	4	–	6	.400	23	–	11	.676
Washington State	3	–	7	.300	17	–	11	.607
Montana	1	–	4	.200	7	–	8	.467
South
California †	5	–	3	.625	14	–	4	.778
USC	4	–	4	.500	15	–	4	.789
Stanford	3	–	5	.375	10	–	5	.667
† Conference playoff series winner As of 1924

1923–24 Rocky Mountain Athletic Conference standings
	Conf.				Overall
Team	W		L	PCT	W		L	PCT
Colorado
Colorado College†	9	–	1	.900	15	–	2	.882
Colorado Mines	8	–	4	.667	8	–	4	.667
Colorado Agricultural	6	–	4	.600	6	–	5	.545
Colorado	3	–	5	.375	4	–	7	.364
Denver	3	–	7	.300	3	–	8	.273
Wyoming	1	–	7	.125	2	–	13	.133
Utah
BYU	7	–	1	.875	14	–	4	.778
Utah Agricultural	3	–	5	.375	6	–	6	.500
Utah	2	–	6	.250	2	–	6	.250
† Conference championship winner

1923–24 Southern Conference men's basketball standings
	Conf.				Overall
Team	W		L	PCT	W		L	PCT
Tulane	10	–	0	1.000	21	–	1	.955
North Carolina†	7	–	0	1.000	26	–	0	1.000
Georgia	7	–	0	1.000	16	–	5	.762
Alabama	5	–	1	.833	12	–	4	.750
Kentucky	6	–	2	.750	13	–	3	.813
Mississippi A&M	8	–	4	.667	13	–	8	.619
Virginia	3	–	2	.600	12	–	3	.800
Tennessee	5	–	5	.500	10	–	8	.556
South Carolina	2	–	2	.500	11	–	9	.550
Georgia Tech	4	–	5	.444	9	–	13	.409
Mississippi	2	–	4	.333	16	–	6	.727
Washington and Lee	2	–	4	.333	9	–	5	.643
NC State	2	–	4	.333	7	–	16	.304
Maryland	1	–	2	.333	5	–	7	.417
Vanderbilt	1	–	3	.250	7	–	15	.318
Florida	0	–	2	.000	5	–	10	.333
Sewanee	0	–	2	.000	2	–	7	.222
Virginia Tech	0	–	4	.000	5	–	13	.278
Auburn	0	–	6	.000	4	–	9	.308
Clemson	0	–	6	.000	2	–	14	.125
LSU	0	–	7	.000	8	–	12	.400
† Southern Conference Tournament winner

1923–24 Southwest Conference men's basketball standings
	Conf.				Overall
Team	W		L	PCT	W		L	PCT
Texas	20	–	0	1.000	23	–	0	1.000
TCU	15	–	4	.789	16	–	4	.800
Texas A&M	13	–	10	.565	13	–	10	.565
Oklahoma A&M	9	–	5	.643	14	–	6	.700
Baylor	7	–	17	.292	11	–	23	.324
SMU	7	–	15	.318	9	–	15	.375
Arkansas	3	–	9	.250	17	–	11	.607
Rice	3	–	17	.150	3	–	17	.150

=== Independents ===
A total of 99 college teams played as major independents. Beloit (14–0) and Carleton (15–0) were undefeated, and Valparaiso (24–4) finished with the most wins.

1923–24 NCAA men's basketball independents standings
	Conf.				Overall
Team	W		L	PCT	W		L	PCT
Beloit		–		–	14	–	0	1.000
Carleton		–		–	15	–	0	1.000
Franklin		–		–	19	–	1	.950
CCNY		–		–	12	–	1	.923
Mount Union		–		–	12	–	1	.923
Rensselaer		–		–	11	–	1	.917
Army		–		–	16	–	2	.889
Canisius		–		–	8	–	1	.889
Vermont		–		–	15	–	2	.882
West Virginia		–		–	14	–	2	.875
Montana State		–		–	20	–	3	.870
Creighton		–		–	13	–	2	.867
Penn State		–		–	13	–	2	.867
Valparaiso		–		–	24	–	4	.857
Navy		–		–	15	–	3	.833
Arizona		–		–	14	–	3	.824
DePauw		–		–	13	–	3	.813
Springfield (Mass.)		–		–	13	–	3	.813
West Texas State		–		–	13	–	3	.813
Denison		–		–	12	–	3	.800
Lehigh		–		–	12	–	3	.800
Saint Louis		–		–	8	–	2	.800
Saint Mary's (Calif.)		–		–	12	–	3	.800
UCLA		–		–	8	–	2	.800
St. Ignatius		–		–	14	–	4	.778
Washburn		–		–	13	–	4	.765
Xavier		–		–	13	–	4	.765
Ohio		–		–	16	–	5	.762
Trinity (N.C.)		–		–	19	–	6	.760
Temple		–		–	15	–	5	.750
Richmond		–		–	14	–	5	.737
Wake Forest		–		–	18	–	7	.720
Grove City		–		–	15	–	6	.714
St. Bonaventure		–		–	7	–	3	.700
Indiana State		–		–	16	–	7	.696
North Dakota Agricultural		–		–	16	–	7	.696
Muhlenberg		–		–	11	–	5	.688
Colgate		–		–	13	–	6	.684
Georgetown		–		–	6	–	3	.667
Northern Colorado		–		–	10	–	5	.667
Rutgers		–		–	8	–	4	.667
Saint Francis (N.Y.)		–		–	18	–	9	.667
Tulsa		–		–	2	–	1	.667
Villanova		–		–	14	–	7	.667
Washington College		–		–	12	–	6	.667
Notre Dame		–		–	15	–	8	.652
Dayton		–		–	9	–	5	.643
Butler		–		–	12	–	7	.632
New Mexico		–		–	5	–	3	.625
Union (N.Y.)		–		–	10	–	6	.625
Western State Normal		–		–	13	–	8	.619
Fordham		–		–	12	–	8	.600
Rhode Island State		–		–	9	–	6	.600
Pittsburgh		–		–	10	–	7	.588
Cincinnati		–		–	11	–	8	.579
Harvard		–		–	11	–	8	.579
DePaul		–		–	8	–	6	.571
Duquesne		–		–	8	–	6	.571
Manhattan		–		–	12	–	9	.571
VMI		–		–	8	–	6	.571
Buffalo		–		–	7	–	6	.538
Marshall		–		–	8	–	7	.533
Detroit		–		–	9	–	8	.529
Davidson		–		–	10	–	9	.526
New Mexico A&M		–		–	10	–	9	.526
Bradley		–		–	11	–	10	.524
St. John's (N.Y.)		–		–	16	–	15	.516
Furman		–		–	7	–	7	.500
Marquette		–		–	10	–	10	.500
Michigan Agricultural		–		–	10	–	10	.500
New York University		–		–	8	–	8	.500
Northern Arizona Normal		–		–	7	–	7	.500
St. Joseph's		–		–	9	–	9	.500
Toledo		–		–	5	–	5	.500
Western Kentucky State		–		–	9	–	9	.500
Niagara		–		–	9	–	10	.474
Seton Hall		–		–	6	–	7	.462
Fairmount		–		–	10	–	12	.455
Loyola (Md.)		–		–	8	–	10	.444
Syracuse		–		–	8	–	10	.444
Loyola (Ill.)		–		–	8	–	11	.421
Brown		–		–	7	–	12	.368
Holy Cross		–		–	5	–	9	.357
Connecticut		–		–	4	–	8	.333
Wabash		–		–	4	–	8	.333
William & Mary		–		–	8	–	16	.333
Kent State Normal		–		–	4	–	9	.308
Lafayette		–		–	6	–	14	.300
Wooster		–		–	4	–	10	.286
Tempe Normal		–		–	3	–	9	.250
Louisville		–		–	4	–	13	.235
Texas State M&M		–		–	3	–	10	.231
The Citadel		–		–	2	–	8	.200
Western State		–		–	1	–	4	.200
Miami (Ohio)		–		–	2	–	9	.182
Bowling Green State		–		–	3	–	15	.167
Bucknell		–		–	1	–	5	.167
George Washington		–		–	1	–	9	.100
Santa Clara		–		–	1	–	9	.100

== Awards ==
=== Helms College Basketball All-Americans ===
The practice of selecting a Consensus All-American Team did not begin until the 1928–29 season. The Helms Athletic Foundation later retroactively selected a list of All-Americans for the 1923–24 season.

Player	Team
Tusten Ackerman	Kansas
Charlie T. Black	Kansas
Cartwright Carmichael	North Carolina
Jack Cobb	North Carolina
Abb Curtis	Texas
Amory Gill	Oregon Agricultural
Harry Kipke	Michigan
Hugh Latham	Oregon
James Lovley	Creighton
H. W. Middlesworth	Butler

=== Major player of the year awards ===
- Helms Player of the Year: Charlie T. Black, Kansas (retroactive selection in 1944)

== Coaching changes ==
A number of teams changed coaches during the season and after it ended.

Team	Former Coach	Interim Coach	New Coach	Reason
Arizona	Basil Stanley		Walter Davis	
Army	John Van Vliet		Harry A. Fisher	
Auburn	Wilbur Hutsell		Herb Bunker	
California	Earl Wright		Nibs Price	
Canisius	Luke Urban		Russell Burt	
Colorado	Enoch J. Mills		Howard Berford	
Dartmouth	George Zahn		Lew Wachter	
DePaul	Robert L. Stevenson		Harry Adams	
Duquesne	Bill Campbell		Chick Davies	
Georgia Tech	William Alexander		Harold Hansen	
Holy Cross	William Casey		Ken Simedinger	
Indiana	Leslie Mann		Everett Dean	
Indiana State	Arthur L. Strum		David Glascock	
Kentucky	George Buchheit		Clarence Applegran	Buchheit left to coach Trinity (N. C.).
Louisiana State	Moon Ducote		Hugh E. Wilson	
Manhattan	Arthur T. Carroll		Ward Brennan	
Marshall	Bill Strickling		Russ Meredith	
Miami (Ohio)	Harry W. Ewing		Roy Tillotson	
Michigan State	Mysterious Walker		John Kobs	
Minnesota	L. J. Cooke		Harold Taylor	
Mississippi A&M	Earl C. Hayes		K. P. Gatchell	
NC State	Richard Crozier		Gus Tebell	
North Carolina	Norman Shepard		Monk McDonald	
Northern Arizona	R. H. Drake		W. E Rogers	
Rice	Pete Cawthon		John Nicholson	
SMU	H. A. Faulkner		James W. St. Clair	
South Carolina	Jack Crawford		Branch Bocock	
Syracuse	Edmund Dollard		Lew Andreas	
Trinity (N. C.)	Jessie Burbage		George Buchheit	
Texas State M&M	Jack C. Vowell		George B. Powell	
Virginia Tech	B. C. Cubbage		M. Buford Blair	
Wyoming	John Corbett		Stewart Clark	
