= List of Cincinnati Bearcats men's basketball seasons =

This is a list of seasons completed by the Cincinnati Bearcats men's college basketball team.

== Seasons ==
Record table
Season	Coach	Overall	Conference	Standing	Postseason
Henry Pratt (Independent) (1901–1902)
1901–02	Henry Pratt	5–4	—	—	—
Anthony Chez (Independent) (1902–1904)
1902–03	Anthony Chez	4–4	—	—	—
1903–04	Anthony Chez	8–6	—	—	—
Anthony Chez:		12–10 (.545)			
Amos Foster (Independent) (1904–1909)
1904–05	Amos Foster	6–3	—	—	—
1905–06	Amos Foster	2–1	—	—	—
1906–07	Amos Foster	7–2	—	—	—
1907–08	Amos Foster	9–0	—	—	—
1908–09	Amos Foster	6–4	—	—	—
Amos Foster:		30–10 (.750)			
C.A. Schroetter (Independent) (1909–1910)
1909–10	C.A. Schroetter	3–2	—	—	—
Russ Easton (Ohio Athletic Conference) (1910–1914)
1910–11	Russ Easton	3–6	1–2	—	—
1911–12	Russ Easton	2–9	1–6	—	—
1912–13	Russ Easton	4–7	3–3	—	—
1913–14	Russ Easton	2–8	2–5	—	—
Russ Easton:		11–30 (.268)	7–16 (.304)		
George Little (Ohio Athletic Conference) (1914–1916)
1914–15	George Little	3–8	3–7	—	—
1915–16	George Little	1–9	1–7	—	—
George Little:		4–17 (.190)	4–14 (.222)		
Ion Cortright (Ohio Athletic Conference) (1916–1917)
1916–17	Ion Cortright	3–8	3–8	—	—
Whitelaw Morrison (Ohio Athletic Conference) (1917–1918)
1917–18	Whitelaw Morrison	2–6	2–6	—	—
Boyd Chambers (Ohio Athletic Conference) (1918–1925)
1918–19	Boyd Chambers	3–11	1–7	—	—
1919–20	Boyd Chambers	5–9	4–6	—	—
1920–21	Boyd Chambers	10–11	4–8	—	—
1921–22	Boyd Chambers	15–8	8–4	—	—
1922–23	Boyd Chambers	13–9	7–7	—	—
1923–24	Boyd Chambers	11–8	10–4	—	—
1924–25	Boyd Chambers	5–14	1–11	—	—
Boyd Chambers (Buckeye Athletic Association) (1925–1928)
1925–26	Boyd Chambers	17–2	9–1	1st	—
1926–27	Boyd Chambers	13–5	5–5	3rd	—
1927–28	Boyd Chambers	14–4	8–2	1st	—
Boyd Chambers:		106–81 (.567)	57–55 (.509)		
Frank Rice (Buckeye Athletic Association) (1928–1932)
1928–29	Frank Rice	13–4	7–3	1st	—
1929–30	Frank Rice	14–4	7–3	1st	—
1930–31	Frank Rice	2–15	2–6	5th	—
1931–32	Frank Rice	4–11	2–10	7th	—
Frank Rice:		33–34 (.493)	18–22 (.450)		
John Halliday (Buckeye Athletic Association) (1932–1933)
1932–33	John Halliday	9–9	4–6	4th	—
Tay Brown (Buckeye Athletic Association) (1933–1937)
1933–34	Tay Brown	12–7	6–4	2nd	—
1934–35	Tay Brown	16–3	6–2	2nd	—
1935–36	Tay Brown	10–7	8–2	2nd	—
1936–37	Tay Brown	9–10	6–4	3rd	—
Tay Brown:		47–27 (.635)	26–12 (.684)		
Walter "Rip" Van Winkle (Independent) (1937–1939)
1937–38	Walter Van Winkle	6–11	—	—	—
1938–39	Walter Van Winkle	12–5	—	—	—
Walter Van Winkle:		18–16 (.529)			
Clark Ballard (Independent) (1939–1942)
1939–40	Clark Ballard	8–9	—	—	—
1940–41	Clark Ballard	6–12	—	—	—
1941–42	Clark Ballard	10–10	—	—	—
Clark Ballard:		24–31 (.436)			
Bob Ruess (Independent) (1942–1944)
1942–43	Bob Ruess	9–10	—	—	—
1943–44	Bob Ruess	6–5	—	—	—
Bob Ruess:		15–15 (.500)			
Ray Farnham (Independent) (1944–1946)
1944–45	Ray Farnham	8–9	—	—	—
1945–46	Ray Farnham	8–13	—	—	—
Ray Farnham:		16–22 (.421)			
John Wiethe (Mid-American Conference) (1946–1952)
1946–47	John Wiethe	17–9	6–2	1st	
1947–48	John Wiethe	17–7	7–2	1st	—
1948–49	John Wiethe	23–5	9–1	1st	—
1949–50	John Wiethe	20–6	10–0	1st	—
1950–51	John Wiethe	18–4	7–1	1st	NIT First Round
1951–52	John Wiethe	11–16	5–5	5th	—
John Wiethe:		106–47 (.693)	44–11 (.800)		
George Smith (Mid-American Conference) (1952–1953)
1952–53	George Smith	11–13	9–3	2nd	—
George Smith (Independent) (1953–1957)
1953–54	George Smith	11–10	—	—	—
1954–55	George Smith	21–8	—	—	NIT Third Place
1955–56	George Smith	17–7	—	—	—
1956–57	George Smith	15–9	—	—	NIT First Round
George Smith (Missouri Valley Conference) (1957–1960)
1957–58	George Smith	25–3	13–1	1st	NCAA University Division Sweet Sixteen
1958–59	George Smith	26–4	13–1	1st	NCAA University Division Final Four
1959–60	George Smith	28–2	13–1	1st	NCAA University Division Final Four
George Smith:		154–56 (.733)	48–6 (.889)		
Ed Jucker (Missouri Valley Conference) (1960–1965)
1960–61	Ed Jucker	27–3	10–2	1st	NCAA University Division Champion
1961–62	Ed Jucker	29–2	10–2	1st	NCAA University Division Champion
1962–63	Ed Jucker	26–2	11–1	1st	NCAA University Division Runner-up
1963–64	Ed Jucker	17–9	6–6	4th	—
1964–65	Ed Jucker	14–12	5–9	7th	—
Ed Jucker:		113–28 (.801)	42–20 (.677)		
Tay Baker (Missouri Valley Conference) (1965–1970)
1965–66	Tay Baker	21–7	10–4	1st	NCAA University Division Sweet Sixteen
1966–67	Tay Baker	17–9	6–8	4th	
1967–68	Tay Baker	18–8	11–5	3rd	—
1968–69	Tay Baker	17–9	8–8	4th	—
1969–70	Tay Baker	21–6	12–4	2nd	NIT First Round
Tay Baker (Independent) (1970–1972)
1970–71	Tay Baker	14–12	—	—	—
1971–72	Tay Baker	17–9	—	—	—
Tay Baker:		125–60 (.676)	47–29 (.618)		
Gale Catlett (Independent) (1972–1975)
1972–73	Gale Catlett	17–9	—	—	—
1973–74	Gale Catlett	19–8	—	—	NIT First Round
1974–75	Gale Catlett	23–6	—	—	NCAA Division I Sweet Sixteen
Gale Catlett (Metro Conference) (1975–1978)
1975–76	Gale Catlett	25–6	2–1	2nd	NCAA Division I First Round
1976–77	Gale Catlett	25–5	4–2	2nd	NCAA Division I First Round
1977–78	Gale Catlett	17–10	6–6	4th	—
Gale Catlett:		126–44 (.741)	12–9 (.571)		
Ed Badger (Metro Conference) (1978–1983)
1978–79	Ed Badger	13–14	4–6	4th	—
1979–80	Ed Badger	13–15	3–9	6th	—
1980–81	Ed Badger	16–13	6–6	3rd	—
1981–82	Ed Badger	15–12	4–8	5th	—
1982–83	Ed Badger	11–17	1–11	7th	—
Ed Badger:		68–71 (.489)	18–40 (.310)		
Tony Yates (Metro Conference) (1983–1989)
1983–84	Tony Yates	3–25	0–14	8th	—
1984–85	Tony Yates	17–14	8–6	3rd	NIT Second Round
1985–86	Tony Yates	12–16	5–7	5th	—
1986–87	Tony Yates	12–16	3–9	7th	
1987–88	Tony Yates	11–17	3–9	7th	—
1988–89	Tony Yates	15–12	5–7	5th	—
Tony Yates:		70–100 (.412)	24–52 (.316)		
Bob Huggins (Metro Conference) (1989–1991)
1989–90	Bob Huggins	20–14	9–5	2nd	NIT Second Round
1990–91	Bob Huggins	18–12	8–6	3rd	NIT Second Round
Bob Huggins (Great Midwest Conference) (1991–1995)
1991–92	Bob Huggins	29–5	8–2	T–1st	NCAA Division I Final Four
1992–93	Bob Huggins	27–5	8–2	1st	NCAA Division I Elite Eight
1993–94	Bob Huggins	22–10	7–5	4th	NCAA Division I First Round
1994–95	Bob Huggins	23–11	7–5	3rd	NCAA Division I Second Round
Bob Huggins (Conference USA) (1995–2005)
1995–96	Bob Huggins	28–5	11–3	1st	NCAA Division I Elite Eight
1996–97	Bob Huggins	26–8	12–2	1st	NCAA Division I Second Round
1997–98	Bob Huggins	27–6	14–2	1st	NCAA Division I Second Round
1998–99	Bob Huggins	27–6	12–4	1st (American)	NCAA Division I Second Round
1999–00	Bob Huggins	29–4	16–0	1st (American)	NCAA Division I Second Round
2000–01	Bob Huggins	25–10	11–5	1st (American)	NCAA Division I Sweet Sixteen
2001–02	Bob Huggins	31–4	13–2	1st (American)	NCAA Division I Second Round
2002–03	Bob Huggins	17–12	9–7	T–4th	NCAA Division I First Round
2003–04	Bob Huggins	25–7	12–4	T–1st	NCAA Division I Second Round
2004–05	Bob Huggins	25–8	12–4	T–2nd	NCAA Division I Second Round
Bob Huggins:		399–127 (.759)	169–58 (.744)		
Andy Kennedy (Big East Conference) (2005–2006)
2005–06	Andy Kennedy	21–13	8–8	8th	NIT Quarterfinals
Mick Cronin (Big East Conference) (2006–2013)
2006–07	Mick Cronin	11–19	2–14	16th	—
2007–08	Mick Cronin	13–19	8–10	10th	CBI First Round
2008–09	Mick Cronin	18–14	8–10	T–9th	—
2009–10	Mick Cronin	19–16	7–11	T–11th	NIT Second Round
2010–11	Mick Cronin	26–9	11–7	T–6th	NCAA Division I Second Round
2011–12	Mick Cronin	26–11	12–6	T–3rd	NCAA Division I Sweet Sixteen
2012–13	Mick Cronin	22–12	9–9	T–9th	NCAA Division I Second Round
Mick Cronin (American Athletic Conference) (2013–2019)
2013–14	Mick Cronin	27–7	15–3	T–1st	NCAA Division I First Round
2014–15	Mick Cronin	23–11	13–5	T–3rd	NCAA Division I Second Round
2015–16	Mick Cronin	22–11	12–6	T–3rd	NCAA Division I First Round
2016–17	Mick Cronin	30–6	16–2	2nd	NCAA Division I Second Round
2017–18	Mick Cronin	31–5	16–2	1st	NCAA Division I Second Round
2018–19	Mick Cronin	28–7	14–4	2nd	NCAA Division I First Round
Mick Cronin:		296–147 (.668)	143–89 (.616)		
John Brannen (American Athletic Conference) (2019–2021)
2019–20	John Brannen	20–10	13–5	T–1st	No postseason held (COVID)
2020–21	John Brannen	12–11	8–6	5th	—
John Brannen:		32–21 (.604)	21–11 (.656)		
Wes Miller (American Athletic Conference) (2021–2023)
2021–22	Wes Miller	18–15	7–11	8th	—
2022–23	Wes Miller	23–13	11–7	4th	NIT Quarterfinals
Wes Miller (Big 12 Conference) (2023–present)
2023–24	Wes Miller	22–15	7–11	T–11th	NIT Quarterfinals
2024–25	Wes Miller	19–16	7–13	T–12th	CBC Second Round
2025–26	Wes Miller	18–15	9–9	T–7th	
Wes Miller:		100–74 (.575)	41–51 (.446)		
Total:		1,948–1,110			
National champion Postseason invitational champion Conference regular season champion Conference regular season and conference tournament champion Division regular season champion Division regular season and conference tournament champion Conference tournament champion

== Notable seasons ==
- 1959–60 Oscar Robertson scored a school record 62 points in an early-February game vs. North Texas State and in the process became the NCAA's all-time leading career scorer. Robertson claimed national player of the year honors for the third straight year while Cincinnati won its third straight Missouri Valley title. The Bearcats made their second trip to the Final Four. California again turned back UC's title hopes as UC finished third. George Smith stepped down as head coach to become athletic director, capping a career in which he posted a 154–56 record in eight years.
- 1960–61 Largely an unknown team, without Robertson, and with a new head coach, Ed Jucker, in command, Cincinnati stumbled to a 5–3 start. The Bearcats then won their next 22 contests, garnering a league title, a third straight trip to the Final Four, and a national championship. In the first-ever championship game matchup of two teams from the same state, UC defeated Ohio State in overtime, 70–65.
- 1961–62 Cincinnati fashioned a 28–2 record, but the Bearcats had to defeat Bradley in a league playoff game to defend their national title. UC won the Midwest Regional to earn its fourth straight trip to the Final Four. After edging UCLA, 72–70, in the semifinals, Cincinnati became a repeat champion with a 71–59 win over Ohio State. Paul Hogue was the tournament's Most Outstanding Player.
- 1962–63 UC breezed to its fifth straight Missouri Valley Conference crown and, after winning the Midwest Regional, a fifth straight trip to the Final Four. An 80–46 win over Oregon State in the semifinals put the Bearcats in position to win a third straight national title. Cincinnati held a 15-point lead over Loyola (Ill.) in the second half of the championship game, only to have the Ramblers come back to win, 60–58, in overtime. Cincinnati led the nation in defense.
- 1991–92 The Bearcats opened play in the Great Midwest Conference and marked their debut in this new league by sharing the regular season title and winning the tournament crown. Cincinnati made its first appearance in two decades in the Top 20 rankings. The Bearcats were seeded fourth in the Midwest Regional. UC defeated its four regional foes by an average margin of 20.8 points to make its sixth appearance in the Final Four. Michigan's "Fab Five" edged UC, 76–72, in the semifinal.
- 1999–00 Cincinnati was the nation's top team and Kenyon Martin was college basketball's top player. UC was ranked No. 1 in the national polls for 12 of 18 weeks and Martin made a clean sweep of the national player of the year awards (Naismith, Wooden, Rupp, Robertson, NABC). The Bearcats tied a school record for victories with a 29–4 record and won their fifth straight Conference USA regular season title. UC seemed poised for a run for the national title until Martin suffered a broken leg in the Conference USA tournament. Martin was a unanimous first team All-American with Pete Mickeal earning honorable mention honors. Cincinnati went from the #1 team in the country to a 2-seed in the NCAA tournament, and fell to Tulsa in the 2nd round.
- 2001–02 Unranked in the major polls at the start of the season, the Bearcats posted a 31–4 record—setting a new standard for victories—won a seventh consecutive Conference USA regular season championship, captured the C-USA tournament crown and earned their first-ever No. 1 seed in the NCAA tournament. Steve Logan earned his second straight Conference USA Player of the Year award, was a consensus All-American and a finalist for every national player of the year honor. The Bearcats were upset in the 2nd round to 8-seed UCLA in a double-overtime thriller.
- 2011–12 After starting the season 5–3 with bad losses and dealing with the aftermath and suspensions from the Crosstown Shootout brawl, UC's season was already on the brinks halfway through December. The Bearcats then went on a run against fantastic competition and wound up beating 8 ranked teams, the most ranked wins in any Cincinnati season in history. The biggest win came against the 31–1 and #2 Syracuse Orange in the Big East tournament semifinals. The Bearcats went on to the Sweet 16 where they lost to Ohio State. The latter half of this season is considered by many to be a big turning point in Mick Cronin's coaching career.
- 2017–18 Cincinnati began the season with high hopes, featuring a team hallmarked by four "1000 point career scorers" (Gary Clark, Jacob Evans, Kyle Washington, and Cane Broome). They spent the entire season in the national polls, peaking at #5 - this was fueled by their defensive prowess which ranked second overall nationally. They earned their first outright American Athletic Conference regular season and tournament championships and tied the school record for wins, going 31–5. Their season ended with a second round NCAA tournament upset to Nevada who tied the record for the 2nd largest NCAA Tournament comeback- surmounting a 22-point deficit to win by 2.
