= 1923–24 Indiana State Sycamores men's basketball team =

American college basketball season

1923–24 Indiana State Sycamores men's basketball

Indiana Intercollegiate Conference champions
- Conference: Indiana Intercollegiate Conference
- Record: 16–7 (7-3 Indiana Intercollegiate Conference)
- Head coach: Arthur Strum (1st season)
- Home arena: William H. Wiley High School Gymnasium

The 1923–24 Indiana State Sycamores men's basketball team represented Indiana State University during the 1923–24 NCAA men's basketball season. The head coach was Arthur Strum, coaching the Sycamores in his first season. The team played their home games at William H. Wiley High School Gymnasium in Terre Haute, Indiana.

== Schedule ==
Date time, TV	Opponent	Result	Record	Site city, state
12/07/1923	at Indiana	L 24–27	1–0	Men's Gymnasium; Bloomington, IN
	Indiana State Alumni	W 39–25	1–1	William H. Wiley High School Gymnasium
	Vincennes Univ	W 48–09	2–1	William H. Wiley High School Gymnasium; Terre Haute, IN
	Franklin	L 20–26	2–2	William H. Wiley High School Gymnasium; Terre Haute, IN
	DePauw	L 14–46	2–3	William H. Wiley High School Gymnasium; Terre Haute, IN
	Rose-Hulman	W 36–14	3–3	William H. Wiley High School Gymnasium; Terre Haute, IN
	Franklin	L 32–35	3–4	William H. Wiley High School Gymnasium; Terre Haute, IN
	Concordia-St.Louis	L 27–35	3–5	William H. Wiley High School Gymnasium; Terre Haute, IN
	St. Viator	W 32–20	4–5	William H. Wiley High School Gymnasium; Terre Haute, IN
	Jenson Brothers	L 29–31	4–6	William H. Wiley High School Gymnasium; Terre Haute, IN
	Ball State	W 24–13	5–6	William H. Wiley High School Gymnasium; Terre Haute, IN
	Concordia-St. Louis	W 43–38	6–6	William H. Wiley High School Gymnasium; Terre Haute, IN
	Ball State	W 43–22	7–6	William H. Wiley High School Gymnasium; Terre Haute, IN
	NAGU	W 20–14	8–6	William H. Wiley High School Gymnasium; Terre Haute, IN
	Pennsylvania	L 20–21	9–7	William H. Wiley High School Gymnasium; Terre Haute, IN
	Oakland City	W 44–18	10–7	William H. Wiley High School Gymnasium; Terre Haute, IN
	Ball State	W 30–18	11–7	William H. Wiley High School Gymnasium; Terre Haute, IN
	NAGU	W 63–22	12–7	William H. Wiley High School Gymnasium; Terre Haute, IN
	Loyola-Chicago	W 41–09	12–7	William H. Wiley High School Gymnasium; Terre Haute, IN
	Eastern Illinois	W 29–10	13–7	William H. Wiley High School Gymnasium; Terre Haute, IN
	Canterbury	W 36–32	14–7	William H. Wiley High School Gymnasium; Terre Haute, IN
	Vincennes	W 27–07	15–7	William H. Wiley High School Gymnasium; Terre Haute, IN
	Evansville	W 43–20	16–7	William H. Wiley High School Gymnasium; Terre Haute, IN
*Non-conference game. (#) Tournament seedings in parentheses.
