= 1923–24 Iowa State Cyclones men's basketball team =

American college basketball season

1923–24 Iowa State Cyclones men's basketball
- Conference: Missouri Valley Intercollegiate Athletic Association
- Record: 2–16 (2–13 MVIAA)
- Head coach: Bill Chandler (3rd season)
- Home arena: State Gymnasium

1923–24 Missouri Valley Intercollegiate Athletic Association men's basketball standings
| | Conf. | | | | Overall |
| Team | W | | L | PCT | W | | L | PCT |
|---|---|---|---|---|---|---|---|---|
| Kansas | 15 | – | 1 | .938 | 16 | – | 3 | .842 |
| Oklahoma | 13 | – | 3 | .813 | 15 | – | 3 | .833 |
| Nebraska | 10 | – | 6 | .625 | 11 | – | 7 | .611 |
| Washington University | 8 | – | 8 | .500 | 10 | – | 9 | .526 |
| Drake | 8 | – | 8 | .500 | 9 | – | 9 | .500 |
| Kansas State | 8 | – | 8 | .500 | 8 | – | 8 | .500 |
| Grinnell | 4 | – | 12 | .250 | 4 | – | 14 | .222 |
| Missouri | 4 | – | 12 | .250 | 4 | – | 14 | .222 |
| Iowa State | 2 | – | 14 | .125 | 2 | – | 16 | .111 |

The 1923–24 Iowa State Cyclones men's basketball team (also known informally as Ames) represented Iowa State University during the 1923–24 NCAA men's basketball season. The Cyclones were coached by Bill Chandler, who was in his third season with the Cyclones. They played their home games at the State Gymnasium in Ames, Iowa.

They finished the season 2–16, 2–14 in Missouri Valley play to finish in ninth place.

== Roster ==
1923–24 Iowa State Cyclones men's basketball team
Players
Coaches

| Pos. | # | Name | Height | Weight | Year | Hometown |
|---|---|---|---|---|---|---|
| F | | Ernest Anderson | — | — | So |
| F | | Floyd Arnold | — | — | So |
| | | J Behm | — | — |
| | | Norton Behm | — | — |
| F | | Butcher | — | — |
| F | | Herman Fennima | — | — | So |
| F | | Bob Fisher | — | — | So |
| C | | Tanner Jacobson | — | — |
| | | Red Kouba | — | — | So |
| | | Rube Morn | — | — |
| F | | "Wee" Paige | — | — |
| F | | Leonard Raff | — | — |
| G | | Guy Roberts (C) | — | — |
| F | | Warren Wright | — | — | So |
| G | | Ira Young | — | — |

Head coach

- Bill Chandler

Assistant coach(es)

Legend

- (C) Team captain
- (S) Suspended
- (I) Ineligible
- (W) Walk-on
- Injured
- Current redshirt

== Schedule and results ==
| Date time, TV | Rank^{#} | Opponent^{#} | Result | Record | Site city, state |
Regular season
| December 15, 1923* | | at Minnesota | L 12–17 | 0–1 | UM Armory; Minneapolis |
| December 21, 1923* | | at Illinois | L 12–16 | 0–2 | Kenney Gym (3,131); Urbana, Illinois |
| January 7, 1924 | | Washington University (MO) | L 26–30 | 0–3 (0–1) | State Gymnasium; Ames, Iowa |
| January 12, 1924 | | Grinnell | W 18–14 | 1–3 (1–1) | State Gymnasium; Ames, Iowa |
| January 19, 1924 | | at Washington (MO) | L 12–25 | 1–4 (1–2) | Francis Gymnasium; St. Louis, Missouri |
| January 21, 1924 | | at Missouri | L 16–34 | 1–5 (1–3) | Rothwell Gymnasium; Columbia, Missouri |
| January 25, 1924; 7:00 pm | | Drake; Iowa Big Four | W 18–17 | 2–5 (2–3) | State Gymnasium; Ames, Iowa |
| January 31, 1924 | | Oklahoma | L 17–32 | 2–6 (2–4) | State Gymnasium; Ames, Iowa |
| February 7, 1924 | | Kansas State | L 17–18 | 2–7 (2–5) | State Gymnasium; Ames, Iowa |
| February 11, 1924 | | at Grinnell | L 17–19 | 2–8 (2–6) | Grinnell, Iowa |
| February 13, 1924 | | at Oklahoma | L 37–45 | 2–9 (2–7) | Norman, Oklahoma |
| February 14, 1924 | | at Kansas | L 16–30 | 2–10 (2–8) | Robinson Gymnasium; Lawrence, Kansas |
| February 19, 1924 | | Missouri | L 14–21 | 2–11 (2–9) | State Gymnasium; Ames, Iowa |
| February 22, 1924 | | Kansas | L 15–20 | 2–12 (2–10) | State Gymnasium; Ames, Iowa |
| February 27, 1924 | | Nebraska | L 16–18 | 2–13 (2–11) | State Gymnasium; Ames, Iowa |
| March 1, 1924 | | at Kansas State | L 20–24 | 2–14 (2–12) | Nichols Hall; Manhattan, Kansas |
| March 3, 1924 | | at Nebraska | L 14–27 | 2–15 (2–13) | Grant Memorial Hall; Lincoln, Nebraska |
| March 8, 1924 | | at Drake; Iowa Big Four | L 22–29 | 2–16 (2–14) | Des Moines Coliseum; Des Moines, Iowa |
*Non-conference game. ^{#}Rankings from AP poll. (#) Tournament seedings in parentheses. All times are in Central Time.
