= 1923–24 Michigan State Normal Normalites men's basketball team =

American college basketball season

1923–24 Michigan State Normal Normalites men's basketball
- Conference: Michigan Intercollegiate Athletic Association
- Record: 13–9 (7-2 MIAA)
- Head coach: Joseph H. McCulloch (3rd season)
- Home arena: Gymnasium

The 1923–24 Michigan State Normal Normalites men's basketball team represented the Michigan State Normal School, now Eastern Michigan University, in the 1923–24 NCAA men's basketball season. The team finished with a record of 13–9. The team was led by third year head coach Joseph H. McCulloch. Francis Davidson was the team Captain. The Normalites were picked to finish first in the MIAA and untimely finished second in the MIAA. Francis Davidson was First Team All-MIAA and James Barclay is in the EMU Athletic Hall of Fame.

== Roster ==
Number	Name	Position	Class	Hometown
	Ted Williamson	Center	Junior	Ypsilanti, MI
	Francis Davidson	Forward	Junior	Pontiac, MI
	Donald "Ping" Draper	Forward	Sophomore	
	Harold C. Dillon	Forward	Sophomore	Grand Rapids, MI
	Charles Lappeus	Guard	Junior	
	Frank Weeber	Guard		
	James Barclay	Forward		
	Robert Button			
	Schoof	Forward		
	Ebner Chaffee	Center	Freshman	
	Robert Button	Guard	Junior	
	Harley Reck	Guard		
	Moore	Forward		
	Ruggles			

== Schedule ==
Date time, TV	Opponent	Result	Record	High points	High rebounds	High assists	Site (attendance) city, state
Non-conference regular season
December 12, 1923*	Detroit YMCA	L 15-16	0–1	– -	– -	– -	Gymnasium; Ypsilanti, MI
December 19, 1923*	Adrian	W 20-11	1–1	– -	– -	– -	Gymnasium; Ypsilanti, MI
December 16, 1923*	Wyandotte	W 24-20	2–1	– -	– -	– -	Gymnasium; Ypsilanti, MI
January 11, 1924; 8:00	Adrian	W 39-23	3-1	8 – Dillon	– -	– -	Gymnasium; Ypsilanti, MI
January 12, 1924*	Detroit Mercy	W 29-24	3–2	– -	– -	– -	Gymnasium; Ypsilanti, MI
January 16, 1924	at Hillsdale	L 24-29	3–3 (0-1)	– -	– -	– -	Hillsdale, MI
January 19, 1924*	Alma	W 32-28	4–3 (1-1)	12 – Davidson	– -	– -	Gymnasium; Ypsilanti, MI
January 25, 1924*	Central Michigan	L 16–26	4–4	– -	– -	– -	Gymnasium; Ypsilanti, MI
January 26, 1924	at Olivet	W 31-18	5–4 (2-1)	– -	– -	– -	Olivet, MI
January 30, 1924*	Detroit Mercy	W 30-18	6–4	11 – Williamson	– -	– -	Gymnasium; Ypsilanti, MI
February 1, 1924; 7:00	Albion	W 45-31	7–4 (3-1)	16 – Barclay	– -	– -	Gymnasium; Ypsilanti, MI
February 7, 1924*	at Western Michigan	L 31-62	7–5	8 – Tied	– -	– -	East Hall Gymnasium; Kalamazoo, MI
February 8, 1924*	at Kalamazoo	L 27-34	7–6	14 – Barclay	– -	– -	Kalamazoo, MI
February 15, 1924; 8:00	Olivet	W 32-17	8–6 (4-1)	16 – Barclay	– -	– -	Gymnasium; Ypsilanti, MI
February 20, 1924*	Northern Michigan	W 47-22	9–6	13 – Davidson	– -	– -	Gymnasium; Ypsilanti, MI
February 22, 1924	at Alma	L 25-26	9–7 (4-2)	– -	– -	– -	Alma, MI
February 23, 1924*; 8:00	at Central Michigan	L 18-30	9–8	– -	– -	– -	Central Hall; Mount Pleasant, MI
February 29, 1924	at Albion	W 26-20	10–8 (5-2)	10 – Draper	– -	– -	Albion, MI
March 1, 1924	Hillsdale	W 42-38	11-8 (6-2)	– -	– -	– -	Gymnasium; Ypsilanti, MI
March 5, 1924	Kalamazoo	W 49-23	12–8 (7-2)	24 – Draper	– -	– -	Gymnasium; Ypsilanti, MI
March 7, 1924*	Western Michigan	L 17-37	12–9	– -	– -	– -	Gymnasium; Ypsilanti, MI
March 22, 1924*	Highland Park JC	W 43-29	13–9	– -	– -	– -	Gymnasium; Ypsilanti, MI
*Non-conference game. (#) Tournament seedings in parentheses. All times are in Eastern Time.
