= 1923–24 Kansas Jayhawks men's basketball team =

American college basketball season

1923–24 Kansas Jayhawks men's basketball

MVIAA Champions
- Conference: Missouri Valley Intercollegiate Athletic Association
- Record: 16–3 (15–1 MVIAA)
- Head coach: Phog Allen (7th season)
- Assistant coach: John Bunn (3rd season)
- Captain: Charlie T. Black
- Home arena: Robinson Gymnasium

1923–24 Missouri Valley Intercollegiate Athletic Association men's basketball standings
	Conf.				Overall
Team	W		L	PCT	W		L	PCT
Kansas	15	–	1	.938	16	–	3	.842
Oklahoma	13	–	3	.813	15	–	3	.833
Nebraska	10	–	6	.625	11	–	7	.611
Washington University	8	–	8	.500	10	–	9	.526
Drake	8	–	8	.500	9	–	9	.500
Kansas State	8	–	8	.500	8	–	8	.500
Grinnell	4	–	12	.250	4	–	14	.222
Missouri	4	–	12	.250	4	–	14	.222
Iowa State	2	–	14	.125	2	–	16	.111

The 1923–24 Kansas Jayhawks men's basketball team represented the University of Kansas during the 1923–24 college men's basketball season.

== Roster ==
- Tusten Ackerman
- Wilferd Belgard
- Vernon Engel
- Henry Heckert
- Daniel Stratton
- Charlie T. Black

== Schedule ==
Date time, TV	Rank^{#}	Opponent^{#}	Result	Record	Site city, state
January 5*		at Hillyard Chemical Co.	L 26–28	0-1	St. Joseph, MO
January 11		Drake	W 49–16	1-1 (1-0)	Robinson Gymnasium; Lawrence, KS
January 15		Oklahoma	W 21–19	2-1 (2-0)	Robinson Gymnasium; Lawrence, KS
January 18		Nebraska	W 19–18	3-1 (3-0)	Robinson Gymnasium; Lawrence, KS
January 22		at Kansas State; Sunflower Showdown	W 36–21	4-1 (4-0)	Nichols Hall; Manhattan, KS
January 26		at Nebraska	W 13–10	5-1 (5-0)	Grant Memorial Hall; Lincoln, NE
January 29		Missouri; Border War	W 16–14	6-1 (6-0)	Robinson Gymnasium; Lawrence, KS
February 5*		at Kansas City AC	L 23–31	6-2	Clubhouse; Kansas City, MO
February 6		Washington University (MO)	W 17–16	7-2 (7-0)	Robinson Gymnasium; Lawrence, KS
February 9		at Oklahoma	L 20–26	7-3 (7-1)	Norman, OK
February 12		Kansas State; Sunflower Showdown	W 23–15	8-3 (8-1)	Robinson Gymnasium; Lawrence, KS
February 14		Iowa State	W 30–16	9-3 (9-1)	Robinson Gymnasium; Lawrence, KS
February 20		Drake	W 28–17	10-3 (10-1)	Des Moines Coliseum; Des Moines, IA
February 21		at Grinnell	W 39–19	11-3 (11-1)	Robinson Gymnasium; Lawrence, KS
February 22		at Iowa State	W 20–15	12-3 (12-1)	State Gymnasium; Ames, IA
February 26		Grinnell	W 39–19	13-3 (13-1)	Robinson Gymnasium; Lawrence, KS
February 29		at Washington University (MO)	W 31–22	14-3 (14-1)	Francis Gymnasium; St. Louis, MO
March 1		at Missouri; Border War	W 30–17	15-3 (15-1)	Rothwell Gymnasium; Columbia, MO
March 26		vs. Missouri; Border War	W 15–14	16-3	Convention Hall; Kansas City, MO
*Non-conference game. ^{#}Rankings from AP Poll. (#) Tournament seedings in parentheses.
