= Boyd Chambers =

American football, basketball, and baseball coach (1884–1964)

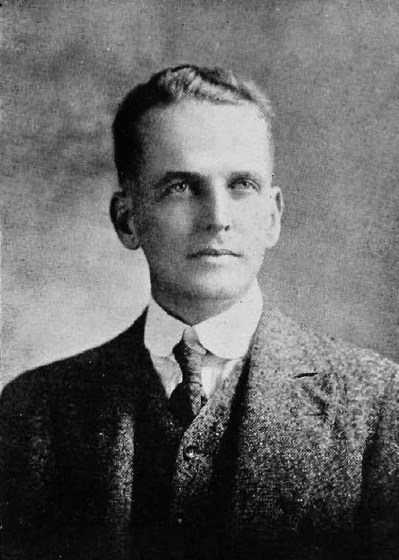
- Chambers pictured in Cincinnatian 1919, Cincinnati yearbook

Biographical details
- Born: November 10, 1884; Chambersburg, Ohio, U.S.
- Died: April 26, 1964 (aged 79); Cincinnati, Ohio, U.S.
- Education: Denison University (1906)

Coaching career (HC unless noted)

Football
- 1909–1916: Marshall
- 1917: Bethany (WV)
- 1918–1921: Cincinnati

Basketball
- 1908–1909: Marshall
- 1918–1928: Cincinnati

Baseball
- 1910–1917: Marshall
- 1919–1928: Cincinnati
- 1932: Miami (OH)

Administrative career (AD unless noted)
- 1909–1917: Marshall
- 1917–1918: Bethany (WV)
- 1918–1927: Cincinnati

Head coaching record
- Overall: 50–44–7 (football); 122–97 (basketball); 163–104–4 (baseball)

Boyd Blaine "Fox" Chambers (November 10, 1884 – April 26, 1964) was an American football, basketball, and baseball coach, and college athletics administrator. He served as the head football coach at Marshall University from 1909 to 1916, at Bethany College in West Virginia in 1917, and at the University of Cincinnati from 1918 to 1921, compiling a career college football record of 50–44–7. Chambers was also the head basketball coach at Marshall during the 1908–09 season and at Cincinnati from 1918 to 1928, tallying a career college basketball mark of 122–97. In addition, he was the head baseball coach at Marshall (1910–1917), Cincinnati (1919–1928), and Miami University (1932), amassing a career college baseball record of 163–104–4.

== Tower Play controversy ==
In 1915 Chambers was involved in a controversy with what would become known as a "Tower Play" during a game between West Virginia Mountaineers and the Marshall Thundering Herd. The Mountaineers were heavily favored and their head coach, Sol Metzger, told the media he would "eat his hat if Marshall scores." Chambers developed a special play to prevent the shutout. On the Thundering Herd fourth possession Marshall moved the ball down to the 15-yard line. Marshall back Dayton Carter came into the game. Marshall quarterback Brad Workman, took the snap and set up to pass. Marshall's tackle, Okey Taylor, and Carter ran toward the end zone. Carter was hoisted onto Taylor shoulders as Workman rifled a high pass in their direction. Carter caught the ball and fell into the end zone for a score. Metzger argued with the officials, but the referee and umpire could find no rule to discount the score. The Mountaineers won the game by a final score of 92–6.

== Head coaching record ==
=== Football ===
Year	Team	Overall	Conference	Standing	Bowl/playoffs
Marshall Thundering Herd (Independent) (1909–1916)
1909	Marshall	3–2–1			
1910	Marshall	5–1–1			
1911	Marshall	4–1–1			
1912	Marshall	3–4			
1913	Marshall	3–4			
1914	Marshall	5–4			
1915	Marshall	1–7			
1916	Marshall	7–2–1			
Marshall:		31–25–4			
Bethany Bison (Independent) (1917)
1917	Bethany	7–4			
Bethany:		7–4			
Cincinnati Bearcats (Ohio Athletic Conference) (1918–1921)
1918	Cincinnati	3–0–2	0–0–2	T–7th	
1919	Cincinnati	3–4–1	1–3–1	12th	
1920	Cincinnati	4–5	3–2	T–6th	
1921	Cincinnati	2–6	0–4	19th	
Cincinnati:		12–15–3	4–9–3		
Total:		50–44–7			

=== Basketball ===
Record table
Season	Team	Overall	Conference	Standing	Postseason
Marshall Thundering Herd (Independent) (1908–1910)
1908–09	Marshall	6–2			
1909–10	Marshall	3–3			
Marshall Thundering Herd (Independent) (1911–1914)
1911–12	Marshall	2–2			
1912–13	Marshall	1–4			
1913–14	Marshall	2–5			
Marshall:		14–16 (.467)			
Cincinnati Bearcats (Ohio Athletic Conference) (1918–1925)
1918–19	Cincinnati	3–11	1–7	—	
1919–20	Cincinnati	5–9	4–6	—	
1920–21	Cincinnati	10–11	4–8	—	
1921–22	Cincinnati	15–8	8–4	—	
1922–23	Cincinnati	13–9	7–7	—	
1923–24	Cincinnati	11–8	10–4	—	
1924–25	Cincinnati	5–14	1–11	—	
Cincinnati Bearcats (Buckeye Athletic Association) (1925–1928)
1925–26	Cincinnati	17–2	9–1	1st	
1926–27	Cincinnati	13–5	5–5	3rd	
1927–28	Cincinnati	14–4	8–2	1st	
Cincinnati:		106–81 (.567)	57–55 (.509)		
Total:		120–97 (.553)			
National champion Postseason invitational champion Conference regular season champion Conference regular season and conference tournament champion Division regular season champion Division regular season and conference tournament champion Conference tournament champion
