= 1922–23 Cincinnati Bearcats men's basketball team =

American college basketball season

1922–23 Cincinnati Bearcats men's basketball
- Conference: Ohio Athletic Conference
- Record: 13–9 (7–7 OAC)
- Head coach: Boyd Chambers (5th season)
- Captain: Joseph Linneman
- Home arena: Schmidlapp Gymnasium

The 1922–23 Cincinnati Bearcats men's basketball team represented the University of Cincinnati during the 1922–23 NCAA men's basketball season. The head coach was Boyd Chambers, coaching his fifth season with the Bearcats. The team finished with an overall record of 13–9.

== Schedule ==
Date time, TV	Opponent	Result	Record	Site city, state
December 10	Ohio State	W 24–22	1–0	Schmidlapp Gymnasium; Cincinnati, OH
December 13	at Central YMCA	L 19–26	1–1	
December 16	Georgetown (KY)	W 36–19	2–1	Schmidlapp Gymnasium; Cincinnati, OH
December 23	Maine	W 33–32 ^{OT}	3–1	Schmidlapp Gymnasium; Cincinnati, OH
December 28	Vanderbilt	L 20–24	4–1	Schmidlapp Gymnasium; Cincinnati, OH
December 30	Coons All-Stars	W 33–24	5–1	Schmidlapp Gymnasium; Cincinnati, OH
January 6	at Ohio	L 17–18	5–2	Ohio Gymnasium; Athens, OH
January 13	at Heidelberg	W 39–20	6–2	Schmidlapp Gymnasium; Cincinnati, OH
January 20	at Oberlin	W 28–15	7–2	Oberlin, OH
January 22	at Akron	L 20–33	7–3	Akron, OH
January 27	Ohio	W 27–26	8–3	Schmidlapp Gymnasium; Cincinnati, OH
February 3	at Covington YMCA	L 25–32	8–4	
February 5	at Kentucky	W 33–24	9–4	Buell Armory Gymnasium; Lexington, KY
February 10	at Wittenberg	L 24–34	9–5	Springfield, OH
February 15	Muskingum	W 42–23	10–5	Schmidlapp Gymnasium; Cincinnati, OH
February 17	Oberlin	W 44–30	11–5	Schmidlapp Gymnasium; Cincinnati, OH
February 21	at Miami (OH)	L 16–19	11–6	Oxford, OH
February 24	Ohio Northern	W 28–20	12–6	Schmidlapp Gymnasium; Cincinnati, OH
March 1	Denison	L 14–33	12–7	Schmidlapp Gymnasium; Cincinnati, OH
March 2	Kenyon	W 35–24	13–7	Schmidlapp Gymnasium; Cincinnati, OH
March 5	Wooster	L 21–22	13–8	Schmidlapp Gymnasium; Cincinnati, OH
March 10	Miami (OH)	L 22–27	13–9	Schmidlapp Gymnasium; Cincinnati, OH
*Non-conference game. (#) Tournament seedings in parentheses.
