= 1926–27 Cincinnati Bearcats men's basketball team =

American college basketball season

1926–27 Cincinnati Bearcats men's basketball
- Conference: Buckeye Athletic Association
- Record: 13–5 (5–5 BAA)
- Head coach: Boyd Chambers (9th season)
- Captain: Jonah Mehl
- Home arena: Schmidlapp Gymnasium

The 1926–27 Cincinnati Bearcats men's basketball team represented the University of Cincinnati during the 1926–27 NCAA men's basketball season. The head coach was Boyd Chambers, coaching his ninth season with the Bearcats. The team finished with an overall record of 13–5.

== Schedule ==
Date time, TV	Opponent	Result	Record	Site city, state
December 10	Berea	W 77–27	1–0	Schmidlapp Gymnasium; Cincinnati, OH
December 18	at Kentucky	W 48–10	2–0	Alumni Gymnasium; Lexington, KY
December 21	Georgia Tech	W 52–25	3–0	Schmidlapp Gymnasium; Cincinnati, OH
December 27	Kentucky	W 51–22	4–0	Schmidlapp Gymnasium; Cincinnati, OH
January 1	Princeton	W 27–25	5–0	Schmidlapp Gymnasium; Cincinnati, OH
January 8	Wilmington	W 43–21	6–0	Schmidlapp Gymnasium; Cincinnati, OH
January 14	at Denison	L 23–25	6–1	Granville, OH
January 15	at Muskingum	W 43–21	7–1	Schmidlapp Gymnasium; Cincinnati, OH
January 18	Ohio Wesleyan	L 28–33	7–2	Schmidlapp Gymnasium; Cincinnati, OH
January 21	Ohio	W 48–20	8–2	Schmidlapp Gymnasium; Cincinnati, OH
January 29	Wittenberg	W 55–27	9–2	Schmidlapp Gymnasium; Cincinnati, OH
February 5	at Wittenberg	L 36–38	9–3	Springfield, OH
February 7	Ohio Wesleyan	W 55–27	10–3	Schmidlapp Gymnasium; Cincinnati, OH
February 12	at Miami (OH)	W 41–31	11–3	Oxford, OH
February 17	Denison	L 27–31	11–4	Schmidlapp Gymnasium; Cincinnati, OH
February 19	Central YMCA	W 41–39	12–4	Schmidlapp Gymnasium; Cincinnati, OH
February 26	at Ohio	L 24–31	12–5	Men's Gymnasium; Athens, OH
March 5	Miami (OH)	W 23–22	13–5	Schmidlapp Gymnasium; Cincinnati, OH
*Non-conference game. (#) Tournament seedings in parentheses.
