= 1923–24 Indiana Hoosiers men's basketball team =

American college basketball season

1923–24 Indiana Hoosiers men's basketball
- Conference: Big Ten Conference
- Record: 11–6 (7–5 Big Ten)
- Head coach: Leslie Mann (2nd season)
- Captain: Ken Alward
- Home arena: Men's Gymnasium

1923–24 Big Ten Conference men's basketball standings
| | Conf. | | | | Overall |
| Team | W | | L | PCT | W | | L | PCT |
|---|---|---|---|---|---|---|---|---|
| Wisconsin | 8 | – | 4 | .667 | 11 | – | 5 | .688 |
| Chicago | 8 | – | 4 | .667 | 11 | – | 6 | .647 |
| Illinois | 8 | – | 4 | .667 | 11 | – | 6 | .647 |
| Ohio State | 7 | – | 5 | .583 | 12 | – | 5 | .706 |
| Purdue | 7 | – | 5 | .583 | 12 | – | 5 | .706 |
| Indiana | 7 | – | 5 | .583 | 11 | – | 6 | .647 |
| Michigan | 6 | – | 6 | .500 | 10 | – | 7 | .588 |
| Minnesota | 5 | – | 7 | .417 | 9 | – | 8 | .529 |
| Iowa | 4 | – | 8 | .333 | 7 | – | 10 | .412 |
| Northwestern | 0 | – | 12 | .000 | 0 | – | 16 | .000 |

The 1923–24 Indiana Hoosiers men's basketball team represented Indiana University. Their head coach was Leslie Mann, who was in his second and final year. The team played its home games at the Men's Gymnasium in Bloomington, Indiana, and was a member of the Big Ten Conference.

The Hoosiers finished the regular season with an overall record of 11–6 and a conference record of 7–5, finishing 6th in the Big Ten Conference.

== Roster ==
| No. | Name | Position | Ht. | Year | Hometown |
|---|---|---|---|---|---|
| 1 | Ken Alward | G | 5–8 | Jr. | South Bend, Indiana |
| 2 | Harlan Logan | F | 6–2 | Jr. | Bloomington, Indiana |
| 3 | Paul Parker | C | 6–7 | Jr. | Kokomo, Indiana |
| 5 | Michael Nyikos | F | 6–1 | Jr. | South Bend, Indiana |
| 6 | Karl Bordner | C | 6–1 | So. | Brookston, Indiana |
| 7 | Max Lorber | G | 5–3 | Jr. | Columbia City, Indiana |
| 8 | Elton Harrison | F | 5–11 | So. | Lebanon, Indiana |
| 9 | Robert Sinks | C | 6–1 | N/A | Lafayette, Indiana |
| 10 | Earl Knoy | G | 5–10 | Jr. | Martinsville, Indiana |
| 11 | Harold Sanford | F | 6–1 | Sr. | Lebanon, Indiana |
| 12 | George Coffey | F | 6–1 | Sr. | Bloomington, Indiana |
| N/A | Harry Champ | F | 5–10 | Sr. | Rochester, Indiana |
| N/A | John Cox | G | 5–11 | So. | Richmond, Indiana |
| N/A | Emery Druckamiller | F | 5–8 | So. | Syracuse, Indiana |
| N/A | Lindley Ricketts | G | 5–7 | N/A | Lynnville, Indiana |
| N/A | Adolph Seidensticke | G | 5–10 | N/A | Indianapolis, Indiana |
| N/A | Palmer Sponsler | G | 6–1 | So. | Bloomington, Indiana |

== Schedule/results ==
| Date time, TV | Rank^{#} | Opponent^{#} | Result | Record | Site city, state |
Regular season
| 12/7/1923* | | Indiana State | W 27–24 | 1–0 | Men's Gymnasium; Bloomington, Indiana |
| 12/15/1923* | | Rose Poly | W 51–15 | 2–0 | Men's Gymnasium; Bloomington, Indiana |
| 12/20/1923* | | at Drake | W 53–30 | 3–0 | Des Moines Coliseum; Des Moines, IA |
| 12/21/1923* | | at Creighton | L 29–39 | 3–1 | University Gym; Omaha, Nebraska |
| 1/5/1924 | | Wisconsin | L 21–23 | 3–2 (0–1) | Men's Gymnasium; Bloomington, Indiana |
| 1/12/1924 | | at Minnesota | W 29–23 | 4–2 (1–1) | UM Armory; Minneapolis |
| 1/14/1924 | | at Wisconsin | L 27–28 | 4–3 (1–2) | Red Gym; Madison, Wisconsin |
| 1/19/1924 | | at Chicago | L 24–29 | 4–4 (1–3) | Bartlett Gymnasium; Chicago |
| 1/24/1924 | | at Northwestern | W 39–24 | 5–4 (2–3) | Old Patten Gymnasium; Evanston, Illinois |
| 1/25/1924 | | Ohio State | W 31–29 | 6–4 (3–3) | Men's Gymnasium; Bloomington, Indiana |
| 2/2/1924 | | Minnesota | W 39–25 | 7–4 (4–3) | Men's Gymnasium; Bloomington, Indiana |
| 2/8/1924 | | Northwestern | W 30–13 | 8–4 (5–3) | Men's Gymnasium; Bloomington, Indiana |
| 2/12/1924* | | Notre Dame | W 21–20 | 9–4 (5–3) | Men's Gymnasium; Bloomington, Indiana |
| 2/16/1924 | | at Ohio State | L 27–31 | 9–5 (5–4) | Ohio Expo Center Coliseum; Columbus, Ohio |
| 2/18/1924 | | at Michigan | W 23–22 | 10–5 (6–4) | Yost Field House; Ann Arbor, Michigan |
| 2/23/1924 | | Chicago | L 25–26 | 10–6 (6–5) | Men's Gymnasium; Bloomington, Indiana |
| 3/3/1924 | | Michigan | W 31–20 | 11–6 (7–5) | Men's Gymnasium; Bloomington, Indiana |
*Non-conference game. ^{#}Rankings from AP Poll. (#) Tournament seedings in parentheses.
