= 1921–22 Cincinnati Bearcats men's basketball team =

American college basketball season

1921–22 Cincinnati Bearcats men's basketball
- Conference: Ohio Athletic Conference
- Record: 15–8 (8–4 OAC)
- Head coach: Boyd Chambers (4th season)
- Captain: Fred Schierloh
- Home arena: Schmidlapp Gymnasium

The 1921–22 Cincinnati Bearcats men's basketball team represented the University of Cincinnati during the 1921–22 NCAA men's basketball season. The head coach was Boyd Chambers, coaching his fourth season with the Bearcats. The team finished with an overall record of 15–8.

== Schedule ==
Date time, TV	Opponent	Result	Record	Site city, state
December 10	Ohio State	W 33–17	1–0	Ohio Expo Center Coliseum; Columbus, OH
December 16	Michigan	L 18–25	1–1	Schmidlapp Gymnasium; Cincinnati, OH
December 21	Cincinnati Gym	L 25–29	1–2	Schmidlapp Gymnasium; Cincinnati, OH
December 29	Yale	W 28–24	2–2	Schmidlapp Gymnasium; Cincinnati, OH
December 31	Dartmouth	L 20–24	2–3	Schmidlapp Gymnasium; Cincinnati, OH
January 6	Ohio	W 20–11	3–3	Schmidlapp Gymnasium; Cincinnati, OH
January 9	at Akron	W 29–27	4–3	Akron, OH
January 10	at Ohio Northern	W 36–34	5–3	Ada, OH
January 14	Christ Church	W 28–24	6–3	Schmidlapp Gymnasium; Cincinnati, OH
January 17	Central YMCA	L 15–24	6–4	Schmidlapp Gymnasium; Cincinnati, OH
January 20	Muskingum	W 38–29	7–4	Schmidlapp Gymnasium; Cincinnati, OH
January 27	Ohio Mech. Inst.	W 43–15	8–4	Schmidlapp Gymnasium; Cincinnati, OH
February 4	at Ohio	L 13–33	8–5	Ohio Gymnasium; Athens, OH
February 9	Hiram	W 39–19	9–5	Schmidlapp Gymnasium; Cincinnati, OH
February 11	at Miami (OH)	L 24–29	9–6	Oxford, OH
February 16	Otterbein	W 35–21	10–6	Schmidlapp Gymnasium; Cincinnati, OH
February 18	Marshall	W 52–15	11–6	Schmidlapp Gymnasium; Cincinnati, OH
February 22	Centre	W 36–22	12–6	Schmidlapp Gymnasium; Cincinnati, OH
February 25	Ohio Northern	W 32–21	13–6	Schmidlapp Gymnasium; Cincinnati, OH
March 4	Denison	L 24–28	13–7	Schmidlapp Gymnasium; Cincinnati, OH
March 8	Wittenberg	L 19–27	13–8	Schmidlapp Gymnasium; Cincinnati, OH
March 11	Miami (OH)	W 32–24	14–8	Schmidlapp Gymnasium; Cincinnati, OH
March 25	at Cincinnati All-Stars	W 42–24	15–8	
*Non-conference game. (#) Tournament seedings in parentheses.
