= 1925–26 Cincinnati Bearcats men's basketball team =

American college basketball season

1925–26 Cincinnati Bearcats men's basketball

Buckeye Athletic Association Champions
- Conference: Buckeye Athletic Association
- Record: 17–2 (9–1 BAA)
- Head coach: Boyd Chambers (8th season)
- Captain: Wesley Schmid
- Home arena: Schmidlapp Gymnasium

The 1925–26 Cincinnati Bearcats men's basketball team represented the University of Cincinnati during the 1925–26 NCAA men's basketball season. The head coach was Boyd Chambers, coaching his eighth season with the Bearcats. The team finished with an overall record of 17–2.

== Schedule ==
Date time, TV	Opponent	Result	Record	Site city, state
December 12	Berea	W 29–19	1–0	Schmidlapp Gymnasium; Cincinnati, OH
December 19	Marietta	W 43–17	2–0	Schmidlapp Gymnasium; Cincinnati, OH
December 23	at Central YMCA	W 36–21	3–0	Cleveland, OH
December 26	at Cincinnati Gym	W 41–26	4–0	Cincinnati, OH
January 2	Alumni	W 46–27	5–0	Schmidlapp Gymnasium; Cincinnati, OH
January 8	Akron	W 28–16	6–0	Schmidlapp Gymnasium; Cincinnati, OH
January 9	at Denison	L 24–28	6–1	Granville, OH
January 15	at Wittenberg	W 37–34	7–1	Springfield, OH
January 16	Ohio Wesleyan	W 49–35	8–1	Schmidlapp Gymnasium; Cincinnati, OH
January 22	at Muskingum	W 26–20	9–1	New Concord, OH
January 23	at Kenyon	L 38–40	9–2	Gambier, OH
January 30	at Ohio	W 29–27	10–2	Men's Gymnasium; Athens, OH
February 5	Denison	W 31–27	11–2	Schmidlapp Gymnasium; Cincinnati, OH
February 6	at Ohio Wesleyan	W 29–19	12–2	Delaware, OH
February 10	Wittenberg	W 49–38	13–2	Schmidlapp Gymnasium; Cincinnati, OH
February 12	Kenyon	W 45–27	14–2	Schmidlapp Gymnasium; Cincinnati, OH
February 20	at Miami (OH)	W 46–19	15–2	Oxford, OH
February 26	Ohio	W 30–26	16–2	Schmidlapp Gymnasium; Cincinnati, OH
March 6	Miami (OH)	W 49–34	17–2	Schmidlapp Gymnasium; Cincinnati, OH
*Non-conference game. (#) Tournament seedings in parentheses.
