= 1929–30 Cincinnati Bearcats men's basketball team =

American college basketball season

1929–30 Cincinnati Bearcats men's basketball

Buckeye Athletic Association Champions
- Conference: Buckeye Athletic Association
- Record: 14–4 (7–3 BAA)
- Head coach: Frank Rice (2nd season)
- Captain: William Popp
- Home arena: Schmidlapp Gymnasium

The 1929–30 Cincinnati Bearcats men's basketball team represented the University of Cincinnati during the 1929–30 NCAA men's basketball season. The head coach was Frank Rice, coaching his second season with the Bearcats. The Bearcats three-peat as Buckeye Athletic Association champions. The team finished with an overall record of 14–4.

== Schedule ==
Date time, TV	Opponent	Result	Record	Site city, state
December 11	Rio Grande	W 49–13	1–0	Schmidlapp Gymnasium; Cincinnati, OH
December 13	Cedarville	W 52–26	2–0	Schmidlapp Gymnasium; Cincinnati, OH
December 18	Georgetown (KY)	W 40–12	3–0	Schmidlapp Gymnasium; Cincinnati, OH
December 29	Central YMCA	W 41–30	4–0	Schmidlapp Gymnasium; Cincinnati, OH
December 31	at Central YMCA	L 30–34 ^{OT}	4–1	Cleveland, OH
January 11	at Denison	W 33–27	5–1	Granville, OH
January 14	Ohio Wesleyan	W 32–29	6–1	Schmidlapp Gymnasium; Cincinnati, OH
January 18	at Miami	W 30–27	7–1	Oxford, OH
January 19	Wittenberg	W 21–19	9–1	Schmidlapp Gymnasium; Cincinnati, OH
January 25	Ohio	W 37–21	10–1	Schmidlapp Gymnasium; Cincinnati, OH
January 28	at Dayton	W 24–20	10–1	Montgomery Fair Grounds Coliseum; Dayton, OH
February 1	Denison	W 45–20	11–1	Schmidlapp Gymnasium; Cincinnati, OH
February 3	Muskingum	W 31–28	12–1	Schmidlapp Gymnasium; Cincinnati, OH
February 8	at Ohio Wesleyan	L 25–36	12–2	Delaware, OH
February 15	at Wittenberg	L 18–29	12–3	Springfield, OH
February 19	Dayton	W 37–35 ^{OT}	13–3	Schmidlapp Gymnasium; Cincinnati, OH
February 22	at Ohio	L 36–41	13–4	Men's Gymnasium; Athens, OH
March 1	Miami (OH)	W 40–32	14–4	Schmidlapp Gymnasium; Cincinnati, OH
*Non-conference game. (#) Tournament seedings in parentheses.
