= 1927–28 Cincinnati Bearcats men's basketball team =

American college basketball season

1927–28 Cincinnati Bearcats men's basketball

Buckeye Athletic Association Champions
- Conference: Buckeye Athletic Association
- Record: 14–4 (8–2 BAA)
- Head coach: Boyd Chambers (10th season)
- Captain: Richard Bolton
- Home arena: Schmidlapp Gymnasium

The 1927–28 Cincinnati Bearcats men's basketball team represented the University of Cincinnati during the 1927–28 NCAA men's basketball season. The head coach was Boyd Chambers, coaching his tenth season with the Bearcats. The team finished with an overall record of 14–4.

== Schedule ==
Date time, TV	Opponent	Result	Record	Site city, state
December 10	Cedarville	W 69–19	1–0	Schmidlapp Gymnasium; Cincinnati, OH
December 14	at Central YMCA	W 38–33	2–0	Cleveland, OH
December 17	Clemson	W 42–16	3–0	Schmidlapp Gymnasium; Cincinnati, OH
December 19	at L.B. Harrison	W 40–37 ^{OT}	4–0	
December 31	Indiana	L 41–56	4–1	Schmidlapp Gymnasium; Cincinnati, OH
January 2	Princeton	W 43–21	5–1	Schmidlapp Gymnasium; Cincinnati, OH
January 7	Ohio	W 28–27	6–1	Schmidlapp Gymnasium; Cincinnati, OH
January 14	at Miami (OH)	W 36–35 ^{OT}	7–1	Oxford, OH
January 18	at Ohio Wesleyan	W 25–22	8–1	Delaware, OH
January 21	Wittenberg	W 48–46	9–1	Schmidlapp Gymnasium; Cincinnati, OH
January 28	at Denison	W 29–19	10–1	Granville, OH
February 4	Wilmington	W 38–25	11–1	Schmidlapp Gymnasium; Cincinnati, OH
February 11	Denison	W 50–26	12–1	Schmidlapp Gymnasium; Cincinnati, OH
February 18	at Wittenberg	W 39–30	13–1	Springfield, OH
February 22	Ohio	L 33–46	13–2	Men's Gymnasium; Athens, OH
February 25	Ohio Wesleyan	W 31–26	14–2	Schmidlapp Gymnasium; Cincinnati, OH
March 1	Miami (OH)	L 38–39	14–3	Schmidlapp Gymnasium; Cincinnati, OH
March 5	at Xavier	L 25–29	14–4	Schmidt Field House; Cincinnati, OH
*Non-conference game. (#) Tournament seedings in parentheses.
