= 1923–24 Chicago Maroons men's basketball team =

American college basketball season

1923–24 Chicago Maroons men's basketball

Big Ten Conference co-champions
- Conference: Big Ten Conference
- Record: 11–6 (8–4 Big Ten)
- Head coach: Nelson Norgren (3rd season)
- Home arena: Bartlett Gymnasium

1923–24 Big Ten Conference men's basketball standings
	Conf.				Overall
Team	W		L	PCT	W		L	PCT
Wisconsin	8	–	4	.667	11	–	5	.688
Chicago	8	–	4	.667	11	–	6	.647
Illinois	8	–	4	.667	11	–	6	.647
Ohio State	7	–	5	.583	12	–	5	.706
Purdue	7	–	5	.583	12	–	5	.706
Indiana	7	–	5	.583	11	–	6	.647
Michigan	6	–	6	.500	10	–	7	.588
Minnesota	5	–	7	.417	9	–	8	.529
Iowa	4	–	8	.333	7	–	10	.412
Northwestern	0	–	12	.000	0	–	16	.000

The 1923–24 Chicago Maroons men's basketball team represented the University of Chicago.

== Regular season ==
The 1923–24 Chicago Maroons men's basketball season was the third of thirty-four seasons for head coach Nelson Norgren. This group was last Big Ten champion for the Maroons as they would leave the conference in 1946. The team would play twelve conference games and finish with eight wins and four losses (a 66.6% winning percentage). The Maroons were led by captain Campbell Dickson, who would go on to coach football at Minnesota, Chicago, Beloit, Wisconsin, Princeton, Michigan and Hamilton. Additionally, the team rounded out the starting five with Harrison Barnes and Joseph Duggan at guard, Harold Alea and Dickson at forward, and William Weiss at center.

At season's end, Campbell Dickson was awarded the Big Ten Medal of Honor, while also being named 1st-team all-conference forward.

== Roster ==
Player	Position	Class	Hometown
Campbell Dickson captain	Forward	Senior	Chicago, IL
Joseph Bernard Duggan	Guard	Senior
Harrison Everett Barnes	Guard	Junior
Harold B. Alyea	Forward	Junior	Atchison, KS
William Charles Weiss	Center	Sophomore
Joseph Francis Smidl	Center	Junior
McCarthy	Substitute
Francis	Substitute
Stevens	Substitute

- Head coach: Nelson Norgren (3rd year at Chicago)

== Schedule ==
Date time, TV	Opponent	Result	Record	Site (attendance) city, state
12/15/1923* no, no	vs Armour Post/American Legion	L 16–18	0–1 (0–0)	Bartlett Gymnasium (–); Chicago, IL
12/28/1923* no, no	vs DePauw	L 18–24	0–2 (0–0)	Bartlett Gymnasium (–); Chicago, IL
1/3/1924* no, no	vs Yale	W 24–21	1–2 (0–0)	Bartlett Gymnasium (–); Chicago, IL
1/5/1924 no, no	@ Purdue	L 24–35	1–3 (0–1)	Memorial Gymnasium (–); West Lafayette, IN
1/9/1924 no, no	@ Northwestern	W 26–18	2–3 (1–1)	Patten Gymnasium (–); Evanston, IL
1/19/1924 no, no	vs Indiana	W 29–24	3–3 (2–1)	Bartlett Gymnasium (–); Chicago, IL
1/26/1924 no, no	vs Wisconsin	W 35–18	4–3 (3–1)	Bartlett Gymnasium (–); Chicago, IL
2/2/1924 no, no	vs Iowa	W 31–18	5–3 (4–1)	Bartlett Gymnasium (–); Chicago, IL
2/9/1924 no, no	vs Michigan	W 20–18	6–3 (5–1)	Bartlett Gymnasium (–); Chicago, IL
2/16/1924 no, no	@ Iowa	L 13–21	6–4 (5–2)	Iowa Armory (–); Iowa City, IA
2/23/1924 no, no	@ Indiana	W 26–25	7–4 (6–2)	Men's Gymnasium (–); Bloomington, IN
2/27/1924 no, no	vs Northwestern	W 42–26	8–4 (7–2)	Bartlett Gymnasium (–); Chicago, IL
3/1/1924* no, no	@ Michigan	L 23–24	8–5 (7–3)	Waterman Gymnasium (–); Ann Arbor, MI
3/6/1924* no, no	vs Purdue	W 35–31	9–5 (8–3)	Bartlett Gymnasium (–); Chicago, IL
3/15/1924* no, no	@ Wisconsin	L 14–30	9–6 (8–4)	University of Wisconsin Armory and Gymnasium (–); Madison, WI
*Non-conference game. ^{#}Rankings from AP Poll. (#) Tournament seedings in parentheses. All times are in Central.

Bold italic connotes conference game.

== Awards and honors ==
- Campbell Dickson achieved the Big Ten Medal of Honor following the 1923–24 season.
