= 1920–21 Cincinnati Bearcats men's basketball team =

American college basketball season

1920–21 Cincinnati Bearcats men's basketball
- Conference: Ohio Athletic Conference
- Record: 10–11 (4–8 OAC)
- Head coach: Boyd Chambers (3rd season)
- Captain: Edgar Coons
- Home arena: Schmidlapp Gymnasium

The 1920–21 Cincinnati Bearcats men's basketball team represented the University of Cincinnati during the 1920–21 college men's basketball season. The head coach was Boyd Chambers, coaching his third season with the Bearcats.

== Schedule ==
Date time, TV	Opponent	Result	Record	Site city, state
December 9	Central YMCA	W 26–25	1–0	Schmidlapp Gymnasium; Cincinnati, OH
December 15	at Cincinnati Gym	L 30–31	1–1	
December 18	Cedarville	W 63–07	2–1	Schmidlapp Gymnasium; Cincinnati, OH
January 21	at Portsmouth Selects	W 42–28	3–1	
December 22	at Huntington H.S.	W 48–05	4–1	Chillicothe, OH
December 23	at Charleston Barac	W 50–24	5–1	
December 31	Princeton	L 16–30	5–2	Schmidlapp Gymnasium; Cincinnati, OH
January 7	Louisville	W 36–16	6–2	Schmidlapp Gymnasium; Cincinnati, OH
January 14	Kenyon	W 30–10	7–2	Schmidlapp Gymnasium; Cincinnati, OH
January 21	Ohio	L 13–28	7–3	Schmidlapp Gymnasium; Cincinnati, OH
January 26	Kentucky	L 19–26	7–4	Schmidlapp Gymnasium; Cincinnati, OH
January 29	Ohio Wesleyan	L 24–26	7–5	Schmidlapp Gymnasium; Cincinnati, OH
February 4	Heidelberg	W 14–10	8–5	Schmidlapp Gymnasium; Cincinnati, OG
February 7	at Wittenberg; Homecoming	L 10–36	8–6	Springfield, OH
February 12	at Miami (OH)	L 17–26	8–7	Oxford, OH
February 17	Akron	L 19–24	8–8	Schmidlapp Gymnasium; Cincinnati, OH
February 22	Otterbein	W 30–29	9–8	Schmidlapp Gymnasium; Cincinnati, OH
February 26	Wittenberg	L 15–21	9–9	Schmidlapp Gymnasium; Cincinnati, OH
March 5	Miami (OH)	W 38–25	10–9	Schmidlapp Gymnasium; Cincinnati, OH
March 10	at Ohio Wesleyan	L 22–30	10–10	Delaware, OH
March 12	Denison	L 18–23	10–11	Schmidlapp Gymnasium; Cincinnati, OH
*Non-conference game. (#) Tournament seedings in parentheses.
