= 1923–24 Missouri Tigers men's basketball team =

American college basketball season

1923–24 Missouri Tigers men's basketball
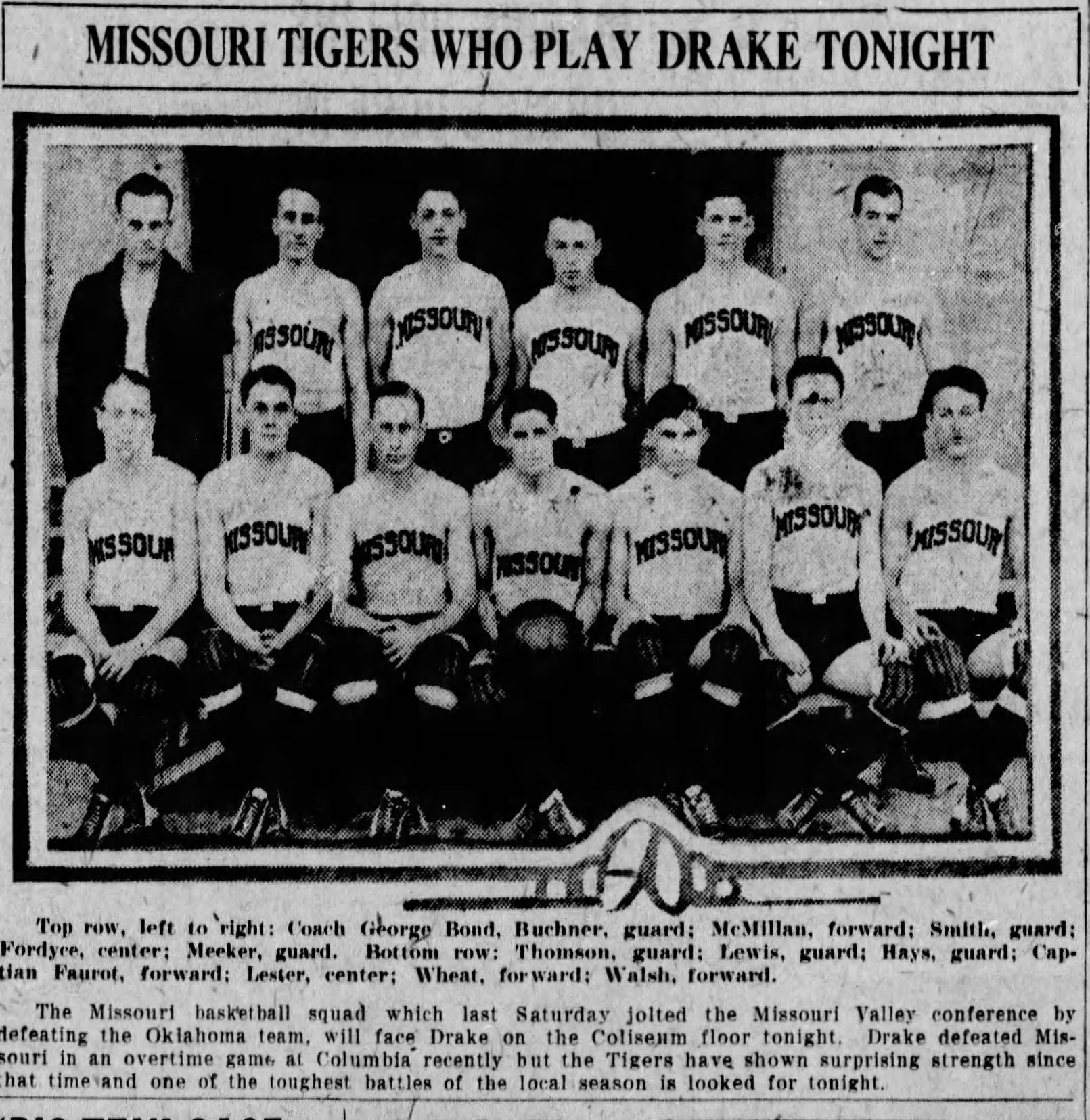
- Newspaper clipping from the Des Moines Register showing the 1923–24 Missouri Tigers men's basketball team
- Conference: Missouri Valley Conference
- Record: 4–14 (4–12 MVIAA)
- Head coach: George Bond (2nd season)
- Captain: Don Faurot

1923–24 Missouri Valley Intercollegiate Athletic Association men's basketball standings
	Conf.				Overall
Team	W		L	PCT	W		L	PCT
Kansas	15	–	1	.938	16	–	3	.842
Oklahoma	13	–	3	.813	15	–	3	.833
Nebraska	10	–	6	.625	11	–	7	.611
Washington University	8	–	8	.500	10	–	9	.526
Drake	8	–	8	.500	9	–	9	.500
Kansas State	8	–	8	.500	8	–	8	.500
Grinnell	4	–	12	.250	4	–	14	.222
Missouri	4	–	12	.250	4	–	14	.222
Iowa State	2	–	14	.125	2	–	16	.111

The 1923–24 Missouri Tigers men's basketball team represented the University of Missouri in intercollegiate basketball during the 1923–24 season. The team finished the season with a 4–14 record It was head coach George Bond's second season leading the team.

== Schedule ==
Date time, TV	Rank^{#}	Opponent^{#}	Result	Record	Site city, state
January 2*		Kansas City Athletic Club	L 24–36	0-1	Rothwell Gymnasium; Columbia, MO
January 5		at Nebraska	L 18–24	0-2 (0-1)	Grant Memorial Hall; Lincoln, NE
January 7		at Grinnell	L 18–25	0-3 (0-2)	Grinnell, IA
January 12		at Washington University (MO)	L 20–27	0-4 (0-3)	Francis Gymnasium; St. Louis, MO
January 21		Iowa State	W 36–16	1-4 (1-3)	Rothwell Gymnasium; Columbia, MO
January 25		Grinnell	W 22–19	2-4 (2-3)	Rothwell Gymnasium; Columbia, MO
January 29		at Kansas; Border War	L 14–16	2-5 (2-4)	Robinson Gymnasium; Lawrence, KS
February 1		at Kansas State	L 26–29	2-6 (2-5)	Nichols Hall; Manhattan, KS
February 2		Washington University (MO)	L 26–27	2-7 (2-6)	Rothwell Gymnasium; Columbia, MO
February 4		Drake	L 24–26	2-8 (2-7)	Rothwell Gynnasium; Columbia, MO
February 8		Nebraska	L 11–31	2-9 (2-8)	Rothwell Gymnasium; Columbia, MO
February 11		at Oklahoma	L 20–22	2-10 (2-9)	Norman, OK
February 13*		at Kansas City Athletic Club	L 19–25	2-11	Clubhouse; Kansas City, MO
February 16		Oklahoma	W 24–21	3-11 (3-9)	Rothwell Gymnasium; Columbia, MO
February 19		at Drake	L 23–37	3-12 (3-10)	Des Moines Coliseum; Des Moines, IA
February 20		at Iowa State	W 21–14	4-12 (4-10)	State Gymnasium; Ames, IA
February 26		Kansas State	L 15–23	4-13 (4-11)	Rothwell Gymnasium; Columbia, MO
March 1		Kansas; Border War	L 17–30	4-14 (4-12)	Rothwell Gymnasium; Columbia, MO
March 26		vs. Kansas; Border War	L 14–15	4-15	Convention Hall; Kansas City, MO
*Non-conference game. ^{#}Rankings from AP Poll. (#) Tournament seedings in parentheses. All times are in Central Time.
