= Campbell Dickson =

American football player and coach (1903–1958)

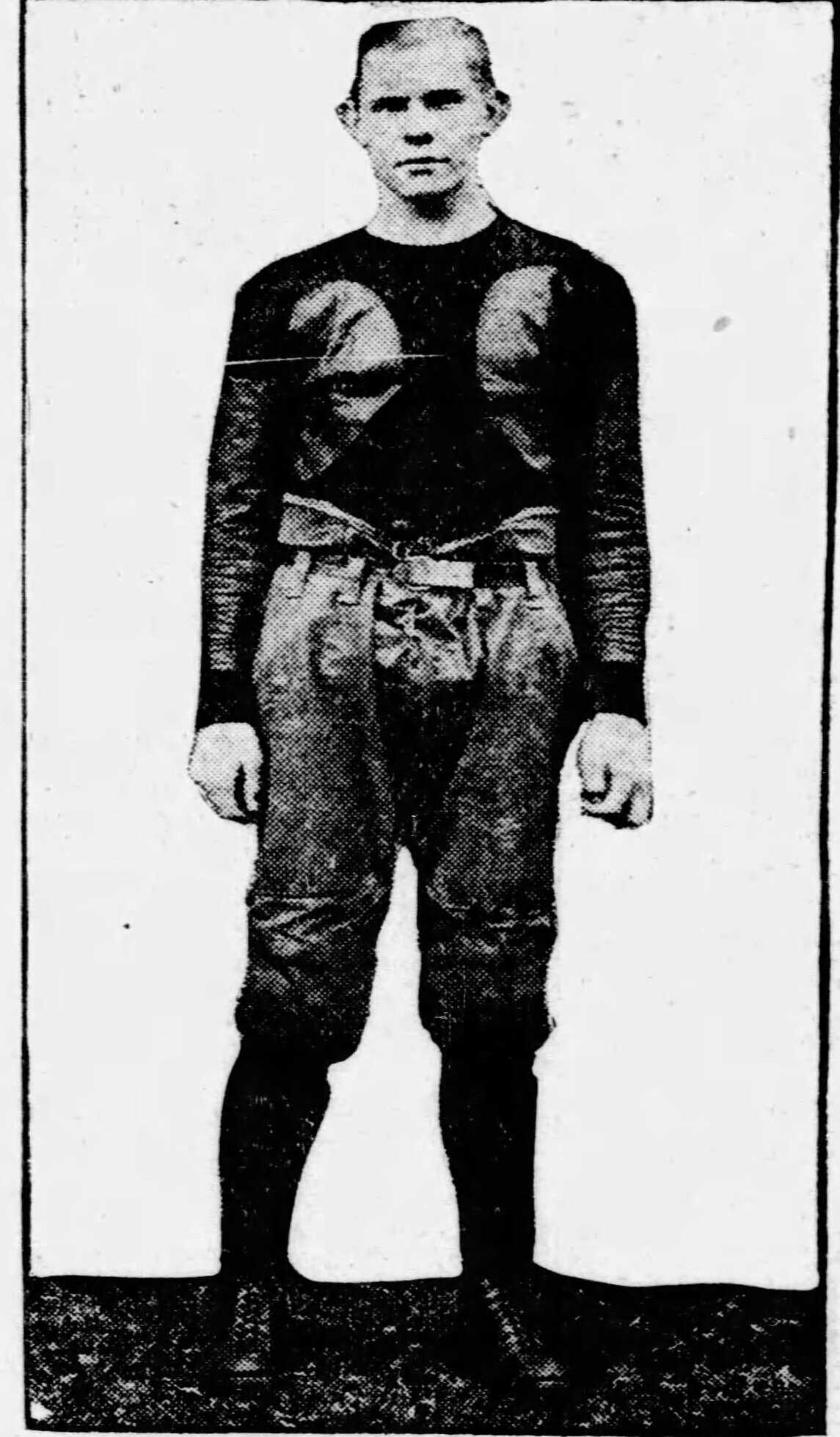
- Dickson, c. 1923

Biographical details
- Born: October 22, 1903; Illinois, U.S.
- Died: July 26, 1958 (aged 54); Will County, Illinois, U.S.

Playing career
- 1921–1924: Chicago
- Position: End

Coaching career (HC unless noted)
- 1924: Minnesota (assistant)
- 1925–1927: Chicago (assistant)
- 1928: Beloit
- 1929: Wisconsin (ends)
- 1932–1937: Princeton (ends)
- 1938–1939: Michigan (assistant)
- 1942: Hamilton

Campbell Dickson (October 22, 1903 – July 26, 1958) was an American college football player and coach.

Dickson was born in Illinois on October 22, 1903 and attended Hyde Park High School in Chicago. He enrolled at the University of Chicago where he played college football and basketball and competed in the high jump from 1921 to 1924. He was captain of the Chicago basketball team during the 1923–24 season. He earned the Big Ten Medal of Honor for basketball in 1924.

During the 1924–25 academic years, Dickson worked as an assistant football and baseball coach at the University of Minnesota.

From 1925 to 1927, Dickson was an assistant football coach at the University of Chicago under head coach Amos Alonzo Stagg.

In 1928, he served as the head football coach at Beloit College.

In 1929, Dickson served as ends coach for the Wisconsin Badgers football team.

In 1932, Dickson joined the coaching staff of Fritz Crisler at Princeton. In 1936, he also became an assistant coach for the Princeton basketball team.

On February 23, 1938, Crisler announced the hiring of Dickson as an assistant coach at Michigan. He remained on the Michigan staff for the 1938 and 1939 seasons.

In 1940, Campbell resigned his position at Michigan to become dean of students at Hamilton College in Clinton, New York. He became dean of the college in 1942 and also served as the football coach that fall.

In 1943, Campbell left academia to join the United States Army as a captain in the government division.
