= Chambersburg, Ohio =

Unincorporated community in Ohio, U.S.

Coordinates: 40°47′15″N 81°01′54″W

Chambersburg is an unincorporated community in Columbiana County, in the U.S. state of Ohio.

== History ==
Chambersburg was platted in 1828. A variant name was New Crambersburg(h). A post office called New Chambersburgh was established in 1846, the spelling was changed to New Chambersburg in 1894, and the post office closed in 1904.
