= 1923–24 Idaho Vandals men's basketball team =

American college basketball season

1923–24 Idaho Vandals men's basketball
- Conference: Pacific Coast Conference
- Record: 23–11 (4–6 PCC)
- Head coach: Dave MacMillan (4th season)
- Home arena: Armory and Gymnasium

1923–24 Pacific Coast Conference men's basketball standings
	Conf.				Overall
Team	W		L	PCT	W		L	PCT
North
Washington	7	–	2	.778	12	–	4	.750
Oregon Agricultural	6	–	2	.750	20	–	5	.800
Oregon	4	–	4	.500	15	–	5	.750
Idaho	4	–	6	.400	23	–	11	.676
Washington State	3	–	7	.300	17	–	11	.607
Montana	1	–	4	.200	7	–	8	.467
South
California †	5	–	3	.625	14	–	4	.778
USC	4	–	4	.500	15	–	4	.789
Stanford	3	–	5	.375	10	–	5	.667
† Conference playoff series winner As of 1924

The 1923–24 Idaho Vandals men's basketball team represented the University of Idaho during the 1923–24 NCAA college basketball season. Members of the Pacific Coast Conference, the Vandals were led by fourth-year head coach Dave MacMillan and played their home games on campus at the Armory and Gymnasium in Moscow, Idaho.

The Vandals were 23–11 overall and 4–6 in conference play.
