= 1923–24 Washington State Cougars men's basketball team =

American college basketball season

1923–24 Washington State Cougars men's basketball
- Conference: Pacific Coast Conference
- Record: 17–11 (3–7 PCC)
- Head coach: Fred Bohler (16th season)

1923–24 Pacific Coast Conference men's basketball standings
	Conf.				Overall
Team	W		L	PCT	W		L	PCT
North
Washington	7	–	2	.778	12	–	4	.750
Oregon Agricultural	6	–	2	.750	20	–	5	.800
Oregon	4	–	4	.500	15	–	5	.750
Idaho	4	–	6	.400	23	–	11	.676
Washington State	3	–	7	.300	17	–	11	.607
Montana	1	–	4	.200	7	–	8	.467
South
California †	5	–	3	.625	14	–	4	.778
USC	4	–	4	.500	15	–	4	.789
Stanford	3	–	5	.375	10	–	5	.667
† Conference playoff series winner As of 1924

The 1923–24 Washington State Cougars men's basketball team represented Washington State College for the 1923–24 college basketball season. Led by sixteenth-year head coach Fred Bohler, the Cougars were members of the Pacific Coast Conference and played their home games on campus in Pullman, Washington.

The Cougars were 17–11 overall in the regular season and 3–7 in conference play, fifth in the Northern division.
