= 1923–24 Kent State Silver Foxes men's basketball team =

American college basketball season

1923–24 Kent State Silver Foxes men's basketball
- Conference: Independent
- Record: 4–6
- Head coach: Frank Harsh (1st season)

The 1923–24 Kent State Silver Foxes men's basketball team was the men's basketball team at what is now Kent State University in Kent, Ohio, then known as Kent State Normal College.

The men's basketball team played 13 games in late 1923 and early 1924, finishing with a record of 4–9. It was the first year for new coach Frank Harsh.

The roster comprised Howard Jennings, Howard Evans, Glenn Francis, Eugene Feeley, Benjamin Schroeder, Ralph Rogers, Herman Chapman, August Peterka and Paul Spangler.

The college still did not have an on-campus facility for practice and home games, although it was looking forward to the opening of Wills Gymnasium which was in the planning stages. Until then practice and games would be held at various locations as they had been since the founding of the basketball team in 1913, such as the atrium of the original Administration Building (known as Cartwright Hall since 2006), in the basement of the original heating plant, in the local Congregational Church gymnasium, and at Kent Roosevelt High School.

== Schedule and results ==
Date time, TV	Opponent	Result	Record	Site city, state
*	Akron Sporting Goods	L 16–27	0–1	
December 26, 1923*	Western Reserve	L 22–26	0–2	
January 10, 1924*	John Marshall Law	L 7–31	0–3	
January 11, 1924*	Defiance	L 6–23	0–4	
January 17, 1924*	Wilmington	L 20–38	0–5	
January 25, 1924*	Baldwin-Wallace	L 20–39	0–6	
February 2, 1924*	Davey Institute	W 13–9	1–6	
February 7, 1924*	Wilmington	L 20–34	1–7	
February 13, 1924*	West Liberty	W 35–22	2–7	
February 22, 1924*	Perfection Dairy	W 35–23	3–7	
February 29, 1924*	Davey Institute	W 34–14	4–7	
March 1, 1924*	Spencerian	W 35–12	4–8	
*	Spencerian	L 24–31	4–9	
*Non-conference game. (#) Tournament seedings in parentheses. Source

== See also ==
- List of Kent State Golden Flashes men's basketball seasons
