= 1923–24 Washington Huskies men's basketball team =

American college basketball season

1923–24 Washington Huskies men's basketball

PCC Northern Division Champions
- Conference: Pacific Coast Conference
- Record: 12–4 (7–2 PCC)
- Head coach: Hec Edmundson (4th season)
- Captain: Richard Frayn

1923–24 Pacific Coast Conference men's basketball standings
	Conf.				Overall
Team	W		L	PCT	W		L	PCT
North
Washington	7	–	2	.778	12	–	4	.750
Oregon Agricultural	6	–	2	.750	20	–	5	.800
Oregon	4	–	4	.500	15	–	5	.750
Idaho	4	–	6	.400	23	–	11	.676
Washington State	3	–	7	.300	17	–	11	.607
Montana	1	–	4	.200	7	–	8	.467
South
California †	5	–	3	.625	14	–	4	.778
USC	4	–	4	.500	15	–	4	.789
Stanford	3	–	5	.375	10	–	5	.667
† Conference playoff series winner As of 1924

The 1923–24 Washington Huskies men's basketball team represented the University of Washington for the 1923–24 NCAA college basketball season. Led by fourth-year head coach Hec Edmundson, the Huskies were members of the Pacific Coast Conference and played their home games on campus in Seattle, Washington.

The Huskies were 12–2 overall in the regular season and 7–2 in conference play; first in the Northern division.

Washington traveled to Oakland for the PCC championship series against California, the winner of the Southern division. The Golden Bears won both games in overtime to take the conference crown.

== Postseason results ==
Date time, TV	Opponent	Result	Record	Site (attendance) city, state
Pacific Coast Conference Playoff Series
Tue, March 4; 8:00 pm	vs. California; Game One	L 31–32 ^{OT}	12–3	Civic Auditorium; Oakland, California
Thu, March 6; 8:00 pm	vs. California; Game Two	L 25–28 ^{OT}	12–4	Civic Auditorium; Oakland, California
*Non-conference game. (#) Tournament seedings in parentheses. All times are in Pacific time.
