= 1923–24 Cincinnati Bearcats men's basketball team =

American college basketball season

1923–24 Cincinnati Bearcats men's basketball
- Conference: Ohio Athletic Conference
- Record: 11–8 (10–4 OAC)
- Head coach: Boyd Chambers (6th season)
- Captain: Carson Hoy
- Home arena: Schmidlapp Gymnasium

The 1923–24 Cincinnati Bearcats men's basketball team represented the University of Cincinnati during the 1923–24 NCAA men's basketball season. The head coach was Boyd Chambers, coaching his sixth season with the Bearcats. The team finished with an overall record of 11–8.

== Schedule ==
| Date time, TV | Opponent | Result | Record | Site city, state |
|---|---|---|---|---|
| December 15 | at Portsmouth Selects | W 19–16 | 1–0 | |
| December 21 | Michigan | L 14–25 | 1–1 | Schmidlapp Gymnasium; Cincinnati, OH |
| December 29 | Yale | L 21–38 | 1–2 | Schmidlapp Gymnasium; Cincinnati, OH |
| January 4 | Kenyon | W 21–20 | 2–2 | Schmidlapp Gymnasium; Cincinnati, OH |
| January 5 | at Wooster | W 24–7 | 3–2 | Wooster, OH |
| January 12 | at Denison | W 26–20 | 4–2 | Granville, OH |
| January 18 | at Wittenberg | W 35–21 | 5–2 | Springfield, OH |
| January 19 | Muskingum | W 24–10 | 6–2 | Schmidlapp Gymnasium; Cincinnati, OH |
| January 23 | at Otterbein | W 23–19 | 7–2 | Oberlin, OH |
| January 26 | Ohio | L 18–19 | 7–3 | Schmidlapp Gymnasium; Cincinnati, OH |
| February 2 | Alumni | L 22–25 | 7–4 | Schmidlapp Gymnasium; Cincinnati, OH |
| February 9 | Wittenberg | W 27–19 | 8–4 | Schmidlapp Gymnasium; Cincinnati, OH |
| February 16 | Virginia | L 27–31 | 8–5 | Schmidlapp Gymnasium; Cincinnati, OH |
| February 21 | Akron | L 25–29 | 8–6 | Schmidlapp Gymnasium; Cincinnati, OH |
| February 23 | at Ohio | L 13–24 | 8–7 | Men's Gymnasium; Athens, OH |
| February 28 | Denison | L 16–27 | 8–8 | Schmidlapp Gymnasium; Cincinnati, OH |
| March 6 | Otterbein | W 37–17 | 9–8 | Schmidlapp Gymnasium; Cincinnati, OH |
| March 8 | at Miami (OH) | W 28–21 | 10–8 | Oxford, OH |
| March 15 | Miami (OH) | W 27–25 | 11–8 | Schmidlapp Gymnasium; Cincinnati, OH |
*Non-conference game. (#) Tournament seedings in parentheses.
