= 1923–24 Illinois Fighting Illini men's basketball team =

American college basketball season

1923–24 Illinois Fighting Illini men's basketball
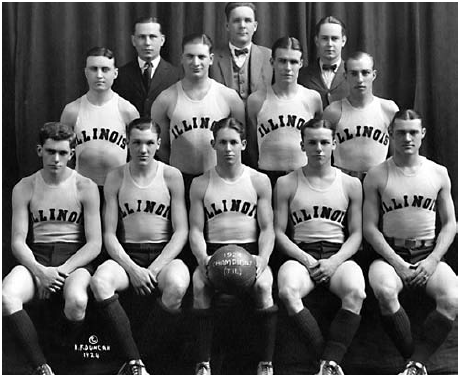

Big Ten Conference Champion
- Conference: Big Ten Conference
- Record: 11–6 (8–4 Big Ten)
- Head coach: J. Craig Ruby (2nd season)
- Captain: Glenn Potter
- Home arena: Kenney Gym

1923–24 Big Ten Conference men's basketball standings
	Conf.				Overall
Team	W		L	PCT	W		L	PCT
Wisconsin	8	–	4	.667	11	–	5	.688
Chicago	8	–	4	.667	11	–	6	.647
Illinois	8	–	4	.667	11	–	6	.647
Ohio State	7	–	5	.583	12	–	5	.706
Purdue	7	–	5	.583	12	–	5	.706
Indiana	7	–	5	.583	11	–	6	.647
Michigan	6	–	6	.500	10	–	7	.588
Minnesota	5	–	7	.417	9	–	8	.529
Iowa	4	–	8	.333	7	–	10	.412
Northwestern	0	–	12	.000	0	–	16	.000

The 1923–24 Illinois Fighting Illini men's basketball team season represented the University of Illinois.

== Regular season ==
Second year Fighting Illini coach, Craig Ruby, took advantage of 12 returning players from a team that finished tied for fourth in the Big Ten a season earlier. The 1923–24 campaign was the first of two conference titles during Ruby's tenure as the Fighting Illini's head coach. The final conference record of eight wins and four losses tied the Illini with Wisconsin and Chicago in the race to be the best in the Big Ten. The overall record for this team was 11 wins and 6 losses. The starting lineup included captain G.E. Potter, T.D. Karnes and John Mauer at forward, Leland Stillwell at center, and Jack Lipe and R.H. Popken as guards.

=== Roster ===
1923–24 Illinois Fighting Illini men's basketball team
Players
Coaches

Pos.	#	Name	Height	Weight	Year	Hometown
F	1	Glenn E. Potter (C)	—	—	Sr	Orange, California
C	2	Leland "Slim" Stillwell	—	—	Sr	Olney, Illinois
F	3	Roland H. Popken	—	—	Sr	Oak Park, Illinois
F	4	Wally Roettger	—	—	Sr	St. Louis, Missouri
G	5	Jack Lipe	—	—	So	Decatur, Illinois
F	6	Lawrence Moore Plummer	—	—	So	Wheaton, Illinois
F	7	James Richard Broderick	—	—	So	East St. Louis, Illinois
F	8	Herbert Roy Helsing	—	—	So	Chicago, Illinois
G	9	Leonard Haines	—	—	So	Belvidere, Illinois
G	10	Earl Tanner Britton	—	—	So	Elgin, Illinois
F	11	John Mauer	—	—	So	Batavia, Illinois
F	12	Curtis R. Parker	—	—	Jr	Fort Wayne, Indiana
F	13	Russell Daugherity	—	—	Fr	Streator, Illinois
F	14	William Green	—	—	So	Urbana, Illinois
F	15	Hollie Martin	—	—	So	Perrysville, Indiana
G	16	Cecil F. Hollopeter	—	—	Jr	Spencerville, Indiana
C	17	Richard Clifford Valentine	—	—	Jr	Rockford, Illinois
G	18	John Wilbur "Hank" Hansen	—	—	Sr	Brookston, Indiana
G	19	Eugene Melvin Pattison	—	—	So	Wilmette, Illinois
F	20	Harry Jackson Roth	—	—	So	Mattoon, Illinois
F	23	Don Karnes	—	—	Jr	Fairbury, Illinois

Head coach

- Craig Ruby (University of Missouri) (2nd year)

Assistant coach(es)

Legend

- (C) Team captain
- (S) Suspended
- (I) Ineligible
- (W) Walk-on
- Injured
- Current redshirt

Roster

== Schedule ==
Date time, TV	Rank^{#}	Opponent^{#}	Result	Record	Site (attendance) city, state
Non-Conference regular season
12/12/1923*		Depauw	L 28–29	0-1	Kenney Gym (3,592); Urbana, IL
12/15/1923*		Washington University	L 15–17	0-2	Kenney Gym (3,692); Urbana, IL
12/21/1923*		Iowa State	W 16–12	1-2	Kenney Gym (3,131); Urbana, IL
1/2/1924*		Notre Dame	W 29–21	2-2	Kenney Gym (1,887); Urbana, IL
Big Ten regular season
1/5/1924		at Minnesota	L 20–36	2-3 (0-1)	University of Minnesota Armory (-); Minneapolis, MN
1/12/1924		at Ohio State	W 27–24	3-3 (1-1)	Ohio Expo Center Coliseum (-); Columbus, OH
1/14/1924		at Michigan	L 23–24	3-4 (1-2)	Yost Field House (-); Ann Arbor, MI
1/17/1924		Northwestern; Rivalry	W 38–18	4-4 (2-2)	Kenney Gym (4,124); Urbana, IL
2/5/1924*		Butler	W 28–27	5-4	Kenney Gym (3,455); Urbana, IL
2/11/1924		Ohio State	L 22–25	5-5 (2-3)	Kenney Gym (4,145); Urbana, IL
2/16/1924		at Wisconsin	L 12–13	5-6 (2-4)	University of Wisconsin Armory and Gymnasium (-); Madison, WI
2/23/1924		at Iowa; Rivalry	W 26–14	6-6 (3-4)	Iowa Armory (-); Iowa City, IA
2/25/1924		Wisconsin	W 31–20	7-6 (4-4)	Kenney Gym (4,393); Urbana, IL
2/29/1924		Iowa; Rivalry	W 38–19	8-6 (5-4)	Kenney Gym (4,209); Urbana, IL
3/4/1924		at Northwestern; Rivalry	W 36–35	9-6 (6-4)	Patten Gymnasium (-); Evanston, IL
3/8/1924		Michigan	W 23–20	10-6 (7-4)	Kenney Gym (4,556); Urbana, IL
3/10/1924		Minnesota	W 31–19	11-6 (8-4)	Kenney Gym (4,664); Urbana, IL
*Non-conference game. ^{#}Rankings from AP Poll. (#) Tournament seedings in parentheses. All times are in Central Time.
