= 1923–24 Niagara Purple Eagles men's basketball team =

American college basketball season

1923–24 Niagara Purple Eagles men's basketball
- Conference: Independent
- Record: 9–10
- Head coach: Pete Dwyer (1st season)

The 1923–24 Niagara Purple Eagles men's basketball team represented Niagara University during the 1923–24 NCAA college men's basketball season. The head coach was Pete Dwyer, coaching his first season with the Purple Eagles.

== Schedule ==
Date time, TV	Opponent	Result	Record	Site city, state
	Rochester Opt.	W 18–09	1–0	Lewiston, NY
	Tuscarora Indians	W 26–25	2–0	Lewiston, NY
	St. Bonaventure	L 09–17	2–1	Lewiston, NY
1/28/1924	at Mechanical Inst.	W 35–15	3–1	Villanova, PA
	St. Bonaventure	W 16–15	4–1	Lewiston, NY
2/06/1924	Canisius	L 22–24	4–2	Lewiston, NY
	Albany Law	L 12–19	4–3	Lewiston, NY
	Crescent A.C.	L 28–40	4–4	Lewiston, NY
	Seton Hall	L 29–37	4–5	Lewisburg, NY
2/12/1924	at St. John's	W 38–34	5–5	Queens, NY
	Manhattan	L 19–36	5–6	Lewiston, NY
	Villanova	L 13–20	5–7	Lewiston, NY
	C.C.N.Y.	L 15–25	5–8	Lewiston, NY
2/24/1924	St. John's	W 26–24	6–8	Lewiston, NY
	Lafayette	L 16–17	6–9	Lewiston, NY
	Hobart	W 21–19	7–9	Lewiston, NY
	Rochester Opt.	W 15–09	8–9	Lewiston, NY
3/09/1924	Canisius	L 11–23	8–10	Lewiston, NY
	St. Francis	W 32–29	9–10	Lewiston, NY
*Non-conference game. (#) Tournament seedings in parentheses.
