= 1923–24 Wisconsin Badgers men's basketball team =

American college basketball season

1923–24 Wisconsin Badgers men's basketball

Big Ten Conference Co–Champions
- Conference: Big Ten Conference
- Record: 11–5–1 (8–4 Big Ten)
- Head coach: Walter Meanwell
- Home arena: Red Gym

1923–24 Big Ten Conference men's basketball standings
	Conf.				Overall
Team	W		L	PCT	W		L	PCT
Wisconsin	8	–	4	.667	11	–	5	.688
Chicago	8	–	4	.667	11	–	6	.647
Illinois	8	–	4	.667	11	–	6	.647
Ohio State	7	–	5	.583	12	–	5	.706
Purdue	7	–	5	.583	12	–	5	.706
Indiana	7	–	5	.583	11	–	6	.647
Michigan	6	–	6	.500	10	–	7	.588
Minnesota	5	–	7	.417	9	–	8	.529
Iowa	4	–	8	.333	7	–	10	.412
Northwestern	0	–	12	.000	0	–	16	.000

The 1923–24 Wisconsin Badgers men's basketball team represented University of Wisconsin–Madison. The head coach was Walter Meanwell, coaching his tenth season with the Badgers. The team played their home games at the Red Gym in Madison, Wisconsin and was a member of the Big Ten Conference.

== Schedule ==
Date time, TV	Rank^{#}	Opponent^{#}	Result	Record	Site city, state
Regular Season
1923-12-08*		Millikin (IL)	W 53–13	1–0	Red Gym; Madison, Wisconsin
1923-12-14*		DePauw (IN)	T 25–25 ^{3OT}	1–0–1	Red Gym; Madison, Wisconsin
1923-12-19*		at Marquette	W 27–7	2–0–1	Marquette Gymnasium; Milwaukee
1924-01-02*		Franklin (IN)	L 18–21	2–1–1	Red Gym; Madison, Wisconsin
1924-01-05		at Indiana	W 23–21	3–1–1 (1–0)	Men's Gymnasium; Bloomington, Indiana
1924-01-12		at Northwestern	W 25–10	4–1–1 (2–0)	Patten Gymnasium; Evanston, Illinois
1924-01-14		Indiana	W 28–27	5–1–1 (3–0)	Red Gym; Madison, Wisconsin
1924-01-26		at Chicago	L 18–35	5–2–1 (3–1)	Bartlett Gymnasium; Chicago
1924-02-12*		Butler	W 25–23	6–2–1	Red Gym; Madison, Wisconsin
1924-02-16		Illinois	W 13–12	7–2–1 (4–1)	Red Gym; Madison, Wisconsin
1924-02-23		at Ohio State	L 13–27	7–3–1 (4–2)	Ohio Expo Center Coliseum; Columbus, Ohio
1924-02-25		at Illinois	L 20–31	7–4–1 (4–3)	Kenney Gym; Urbana, Illinois
1924-03-01		Northwestern	W 23–14	8–4–1 (5–3)	Red Gym; Madison, Wisconsin
1924-03-03		Ohio State	W 30–20	9–4–1 (6–3)	Red Gym; Madison, Wisconsin
1924-03-08		at Iowa	L 19–22	9–5–1 (6–4)	Iowa Armory; Iowa City, IA
1924-03-11		Iowa	W 36–26	10–5–1 (7–4)	Red Gym; Madison, Wisconsin
1924-03-15		Chicago	W 30–14	11–5–1 (8–4)	Red Gym; Madison, Wisconsin
*Non-conference game. ^{#}Rankings from AP Poll. (#) Tournament seedings in parentheses.
