= Arthur L. Strum =

American football, basketball, and baseball coach (1894–1947)

Biographical details
- Born: March 5, 1894; Minneapolis, Minnesota, U.S.
- Died: August 12, 1947 (aged 53); Terre Haute, Indiana, U.S.

Coaching career (HC unless noted)

Football
- 1916: Northern Normal
- 1919: Oshkosh Normal
- 1920–1922: Fort Wayne Central HS (IN)
- 1923–1926: Indiana State
- 1932: Indiana State
- 1942: Indiana State

Basketball
- 1916–1917: Northern Normal and Industrial
- 1920–1922: Fort Wayne Central HS (IN)
- 1923–1924: Indiana State

Baseball
- 1924–1928: Indiana State

Administrative career (AD unless noted)
- 1923–1938: Indiana State

Head coaching record
- Overall: 30–25–2 (college football); 31–10 (college basketball); 41–16 (college baseball)

Arthur Leander Strum (March 5, 1894 – August 12, 1947) was an American football, basketball, and baseball coach and athletics administrator. He served as the head football coach at Northern Normal and Industrial School—now known was Northern State University—in Aberdeen, South Dakota in 1916, at Oshkosh State Normal School—now known as the University of Wisconsin–Oshkosh—in 1919, and three stints at Indiana State Teachers College—now known as Indiana State University (1923–1926, 1932, 1942), compiling a career college football coaching record of 30–25–2 (.545). He achieved even greater success in brief head coaching stints in men's basketball and baseball. Strum stepped down from all coaching duties following the 1927–28 school year, moving into athletics administration at Indiana State. He returned for two brief interim stints during absences by Wally Marks.

In 1920, Strum was hired as the physical director at Central High School in Fort Wayne, Indiana. He coached football and basketball there before moving on to Indiana State in 1923.

Strum died of a heart attack, on August 12, 1947, in Terre Haute, Indiana.

== Head coaching record ==
=== Football ===
Year	Team	Overall	Conference	Standing	Bowl/playoffs
Northern Normal (Independent) (1916)
1916	Northern Normal	5–3			
Northern Normal:		5–3			
Oshkosh Normal Titans (Inter-Normal Athletic Conference of Wisconsin) (1919)
1919	Oshkosh Normal	5–1	4–1	2nd	
Oshkosh Normal:		5–1	4–1		
Indiana State Sycamores (Independent) (1923–1926)
1923	Indiana State	3–3			
1924	Indiana State	6–2			
1925	Indiana State	2–4–1			
1926	Indiana State	2–4–1			
Indiana State Sycamores (Independent) (1932)
1932	Indiana State	3–5			
Indiana State Sycamores (Indiana Intercollegiate Conference) (1942)
1942	Indiana State	4–3	1–3	T–10th	
Indiana State:		20–21–2	1–3		
Total:		30–25–2			
