= 1923–24 Michigan Wolverines men's basketball team =

American college basketball season

1923–24 Michigan Wolverines men's basketball
- Conference: Big Ten Conference
- Record: 10–7 (6–6 Big Ten)
- Head coach: E. J. Mather
- Captain: Howard M. Birks
- Home arena: Yost Field House

1923–24 Big Ten Conference men's basketball standings
	Conf.				Overall
Team	W		L	PCT	W		L	PCT
Wisconsin	8	–	4	.667	11	–	5	.688
Chicago	8	–	4	.667	11	–	6	.647
Illinois	8	–	4	.667	11	–	6	.647
Ohio State	7	–	5	.583	12	–	5	.706
Purdue	7	–	5	.583	12	–	5	.706
Indiana	7	–	5	.583	11	–	6	.647
Michigan	6	–	6	.500	10	–	7	.588
Minnesota	5	–	7	.417	9	–	8	.529
Iowa	4	–	8	.333	7	–	10	.412
Northwestern	0	–	12	.000	0	–	16	.000

The 1923–24 Michigan Wolverines men's basketball team represented the University of Michigan in intercollegiate basketball during the 1923–24 season. The team compiled a record of 10–7. E. J. Mather was in his fifth year as the team's coach, and Howard M. Birks was the team captain.

== Players ==
- Howard M. "Hoppy" Birks, Chicago, Illinois - team captain, center and varsity letter winner
- Royal F. Cherry, Grand Rapids, Michigan - guard and varsity letter winner
- Roy F. Deng, Mt. Clemens, Michigan - guard and varsity letter winner
- Richard F. Doyle, Galesburg, Michigan - center and varsity letter winner
- George Haggarty, Ypsilanti, Michigan - forward and varsity letter winner
- William P. "Bill" Henderson, Detroit, Michigan - forward and varsity letter winner
- Fay Kendrick - aMa letter winner
- Harry Kipke, Lansing, Michigan - guard and varsity letter winner
- Carl C. Kresbach, Monroe, Michigan - aMa letter winner
- Joseph M. Landre, Binghamton, New York - aMa letter winner
- Edward D. Line, Detroit, Michigan - forward and varsity letter winner
- Arthur B. "Bus" McWood - center and varsity letter winner
- Kenneth Morgaridge, Chicago, Illinois - forward and varsity letter winner
- Irwin Stegmeier, Grand Rapids, Michigan - aMa letter winner

== Coaching staff ==
- E. J. Mather - coach
- Ralph E. Wright - manager
- Fielding H. Yost - athletic director
