= 1923–24 Loyola Ramblers men's basketball team =

American college basketball season

1923–24 Loyola Ramblers men's basketball
- Conference: Independent
- Record: 8–11
- Head coach: Leonard Sachs (1st season)
- Home arena: Alumni Gym

The 1923–24 Loyola Ramblers men's basketball team represented Loyola University Chicago during the 1923–24 NCAA men's basketball season. The ramblers were led by first-year head coach Leonard Sachs. The team had finished the season with an overall record of 8–11.

== Schedule ==
Date time, TV	Opponent	Result	Record	Site city, state
January 4, 1924*	Armour Tech	W 19–17	1–0	Alumni Gym; Chicago, IL
January 10, 1924*	St. Viator's	W 16–13	2–0	Alumni Gym; Chicago, IL
January 12, 1924*	at Notre Dame	L 23–24	2–1	Notre Dame Fieldhouse; South Bend, IN
January 14, 1924*	Wheaton	W 18–17	3–1	Alumni Gym; Chicago, IL
January 16, 1924*	at Notre Dame	L 16–21	3–2	Notre Dame Fieldhouse; South Bend, IN
*	Milwaukee State	L 22–29	3–3	Alumni Gym; Chicago, IL
January 24, 1924*	Loras	L 22–29	3–4	Alumni Gym; Chicago, IL
January 31, 1924*	Dubuque	W 30–18	4–4	Alumni Gym; Chicago, IL
February 2, 1924*	Rose Polytechnic	W 24–14	5–4	Alumni Gym; Chicago, IL
February 8, 1924*	Milwaukee State	L 24–25	5–5	Alumni Gym; Chicago, IL
February 9, 1924*	St. Joseph's	W 28–9	6–5	Alumni Gym; Chicago, IL
February 10, 1924*	Detroit	W 23–17	7–5	Alumni Gym; Chicago, IL
February 13, 1924*	St. Viator's	L 16–19	7–6	Alumni Gym; Chicago, IL
February 16, 1924*	Wheaton	W 21–19	8–6	Alumni Gym; Chicago, IL
*	Indiana State	L 19–38	8–7	Alumni Gym; Chicago, IL
*	Rose Polytechnic	L 12–20	8–8	Alumni Gym; Chicago, IL
*	Columbia	L 16–26	8–9	Alumni Gym; Chicago, IL
March 1, 1924*	Detroit	L 23–26	8–10	Alumni Gym; Chicago, IL
March 4, 1924*	St. Joseph's	L 15–36	8–11	Alumni Gym; Chicago, IL
*Non-conference game. (#) Tournament seedings in parentheses.
