= Des Moines Coliseum =

Coliseum in Iowa, United States

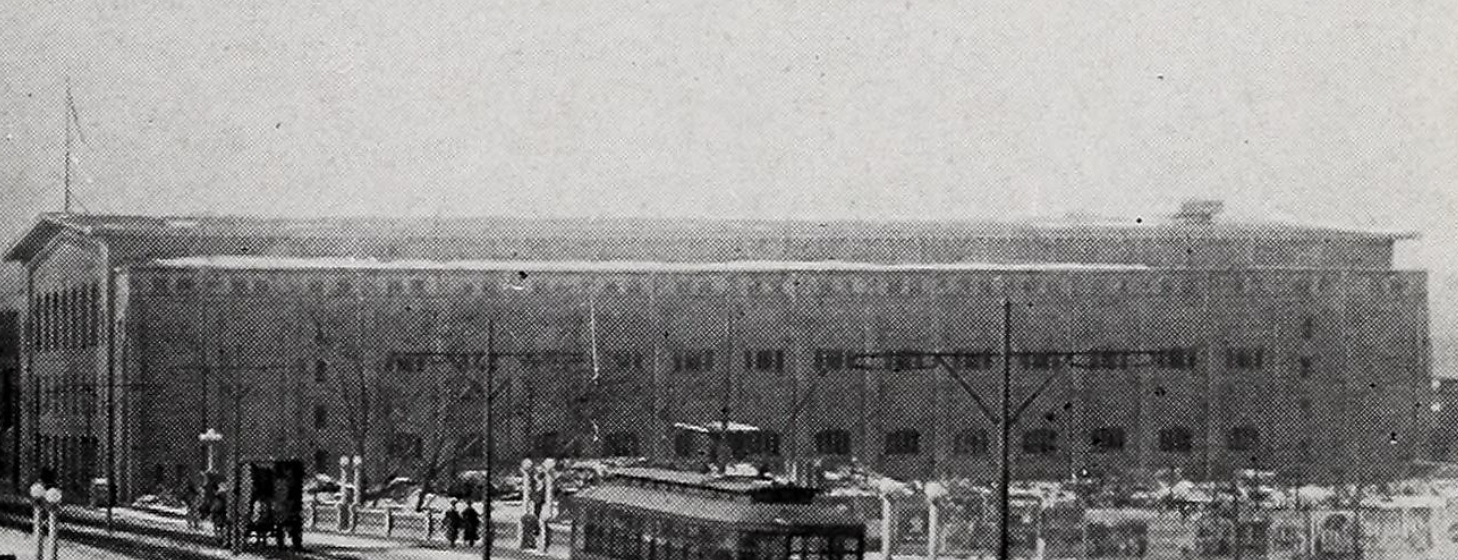
- Interactive map of Des Moines Coliseum
- Location: Des Moines, Iowa
- Coordinates: 41.5885°N 93.6195°W

Construction
- Opened: 1908
- Closed: August 13, 1949
- Demolished: August 13, 1949

Tenant
- Drake University

The Des Moines Coliseum was a building located in Des Moines, Iowa. Opened in 1908, it served as the main venue for large public events in Des Moines for four decades. Herbert Hoover launched his 1932 re-election campaign from the Coliseum, and several other U.S. Presidents spoke there, including Woodrow Wilson, Theodore Roosevelt, and William Howard Taft. Drake University played basketball in the Coliseum for a number of years, and it was used for wrestling, boxing, ice skating, and circus events. It was destroyed by fire on August 13, 1949. A YMCA was later built on the site, but that was torn down in 2015. In 2018 the site was acquired by the GSA to become the new courthouse for the U.S. District Court for the Southern District of Iowa.
