= Central YMCA (Cleveland) =

- U.S. National Register of Historic Places
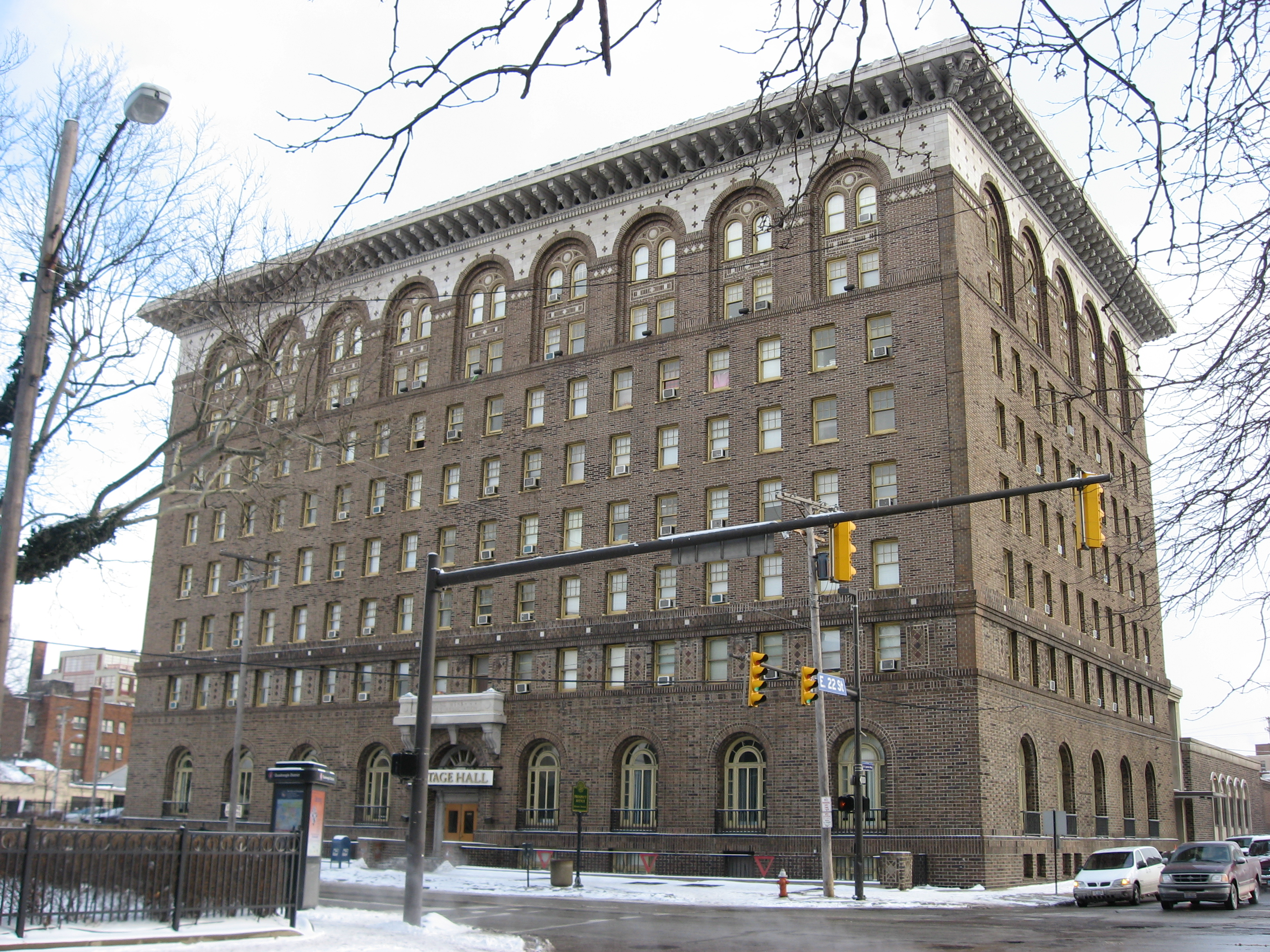
- Front of YMCA

- Location within Cleveland Location within Ohio Location within the United States
- Location: 2200 Prospect Ave., Cleveland, Ohio
- Coordinates: 41°29′59″N 81°40′26″W
- Area: less than one acre
- Built: 1911
- Architect: Hubbell & Benes
- Architectural style: Renaissance
- MPS: Upper Prospect MRA
- NRHP reference No.: 84000221
- Added to NRHP: November 1, 1984

Central YMCA is an historic building in the Central neighborhood on the east side of Cleveland, Ohio. It was designed by the Cleveland architectural firm Hubbell & Benes and constructed for use as a residential building in 1911 by YMCA of Greater Cleveland. The building served as one of the locations used by Cleveland YMCA School of Technology, which eventually became Fenn College and ultimately Cleveland State University 1964. Added to the National Register of Historic Places in 1984, Central YMCA building was purchased by Cleveland State University in September 2009 and later renovated for use as student apartments. In 2015, the building was purchased by Asset Student Housing and is now known as The Domain at Cleveland.
