= 1938–39 Akron Goodyear Wingfoots season =

NBL professional basketball team season

- Head coach: Lefty Byers
- Owner: Goodyear
- Arena: Goodyear Hall

Results
- Record: 14–14 (.500)
- Place: Division: T–2nd (tied with Warren Penns / Cleveland White Horses) (Eastern)
- Playoff finish: Did not qualify

The 1938–39 Akron Goodyear Wingfoots season was the Goodyear Wingfoots' second year in the United States' National Basketball League (NBL), which was also the second year the league existed. However, if you include their previous seasons of existence as an independent team, alongside seasons where they competed in the Amateur Athletic Union, the National Industrial League (not to be confused with the National Industrial Basketball League that they would later compete in, with the Goodyear Wingfoots winning a championship in the NIL in 1932), and what were considered predecessors to the NBL in the National Professional Basketball League and the Midwest Basketball Conference (the latter of which the Goodyear Wingfoots won that league's final championship under that name before it folded operations and was considered to be rebranded as the NBL according to some basketball historians), this season would officially be considered their 21st season of play as a team. This season saw only eight official teams compete in the NBL this time around, with four teams in the Eastern Division (Akron Goodyear's division) and four teams in the Western Division (with one of them being a late addition by New Year's Eve 1938 with the Sheboygan Red Skins officially joining the NBL by that date). The Wingfoots were one of two teams from Akron, Ohio in the league, with the other being the Akron Firestone Non-Skids.

The Wingfoots played their home games at the Goodyear Hall. They finished the season with a 14–14 record, placing second in the Eastern Division, which in this case was a tied record with the Warren Penns later turned Cleveland White Horses and was a half-game ahead of the Pittsburgh Pirates (who had a game against the Indianapolis Kautskys cancelled due to weather issues). Normally, the tied second-place results would have potentially led to some sort of tiebreaker between the Goodyear squad and the Warren Penns / Cleveland White Horses franchises to have the winner compete against the Akron Firestone Non-Skids in the second NBL Playoffs ever hosted. However, for reasons considered unknown to the public, the NBL would condense the NBL Playoffs down to just the championship round between the best teams in each divisions, which were the Akron Firestone Non-Skids and the Oshkosh All-Stars, meaning the Akron Goodyear Wingfoots would be eliminated by default this time around. Worse yet, the Goodyear Wingfoots would have what would be considered their worst overall record in a decade when including exhibition games they played alongside the NBL games they had scheduled beforehand. Despite Goodyear's team failing to defend their NBL championship this season due to their cityside work team rivals in the Firestone squad going on an absolute teardown for their season combined with the unique circumstances regarding the NBL Playoffs this season, both Chuck Bloedorn and Charley Shipp would earn All-NBL Second Team honors for their efforts with the Goodyear squad.

== Roster ==
1938–39 Akron Goodyear Wingfoots roster
Players

Pos.	No.	Player	Height	Weight	DOB	From
F		Wesley Bennett	6 ft 3 in (1.91 m)	175 lb (79 kg)	1913–03-31	Westminster (PA)
G		Chuck Bloedorn	6 ft 0 in (1.83 m)	180 lb (82 kg)	1912–05–28	Illinois Tech
C		Floyd Ebaugh	6 ft 7 in (2.01 m)	230 lb (104 kg)	1914–05–30	Nebraska
G/F		Wilson Fitts	6 ft 2 in (1.88 m)	165 lb (75 kg)	1915–06–16	Akron
G/F		Nick Frascella	6 ft 2 in (1.88 m)	185 lb (84 kg)	1914–07–06	Wooster
F/C		George Hesik	6 ft 2 in (1.88 m)	195 lb (88 kg)	1913–06–15	Marquette
G/F		Bob Johnson	6 ft 2 in (1.88 m)	170 lb (77 kg)	1917–01–29	Pittsburgh
G/F		Mike McMichael	6 ft 2 in (1.88 m)	195 lb (88 kg)	1915–07–04	Northwestern
C		Dean Mealy	6 ft 4 in (1.93 m)	195 lb (88 kg)	1915–05–07	Muskingum
F/C		Ray Morstadt	6 ft 2 in (1.88 m)	220 lb (100 kg)	1913–03–10	Marquette
F		Russ Ochsenhirt	6 ft 3 in (1.91 m)	195 lb (88 kg)	1912–04–16	Pittsburgh
G/F		Bob Parsons	6 ft 1 in (1.85 m)	175 lb (79 kg)	1915–06–11	Nebraska
G/F		Charley Shipp	6 ft 1 in (1.85 m)	200 lb (91 kg)	1913–12–03	Catholic
G/F		Chelso Tamagno	5 ft 10 in (1.78 m)	185 lb (84 kg)	1912–03–20	Michigan

Coaches
Head coach
- Lefty Byers

Legend
- (DP) Unsigned draft pick
- (FA) Free agent
- (S) Suspended
- Injured

Roster

== Regular season ==
=== Season standings ===
Pos.	Eastern Division	Wins	Losses	Win %
1	Akron Firestone Non-Skids	24	3	.889
T–2	Akron Goodyear Wingfoots	14	14	.500
T–2	Warren Penns / Cleveland White Horses^{‡}	14	14	.500
4	Pittsburgh Pirates	13	14	.481
^{‡} Warren relocated to Cleveland during the season and assumed Warren's record in the standings. Warren's record was 9–10 and Cleveland's record was 5–4.

=== NBL Schedule ===
- November 25, 1938 @ Akron, OH: Hammond Ciesar All-Americans 30, Akron Goodyear Wingfoots 33
- November 28, 1938 @ Indianapolis, IN: Indianapolis Kautskys 40, Akron Goodyear Wingfoots 25
- November 30, 1938 @ Pittsburgh, PA: Pittsburgh Pirates 34, Akron Goodyear Wingfoots 37
- December 3, 1938 @ Akron, OH: Indianapolis Kautskys 37, Akron Goodyear Wingfoots 42
- December 7, 1938 @ Sheboygan, WI: Akron Goodyear Wingfoots 32, Sheboygan Red Skins 30
- December 10, 1938 @ Oshkosh, WI: Akron Goodyear Wingfoots 30, Oshkosh All-Stars 26
- December 14, 1938 @ Akron, OH: Warren Penns 21, Akron Goodyear Wingfoots 35
- December 15, 1938 @ Warren, PA: Akron Goodyear Wingfoots 27, Warren Penns 34
- December 18, 1938: Akron Goodyear Wingfoots 40, Hammond Ciesar All-Americans 36 (OT @ Hammond, IN)
- December 20, 1938 @ Akron, OH: Sheboygan Red Skins 33, Akron Goodyear Wingfoots 40
- December 30, 1938 @ Akron, OH: Hammond Ciesar All-Americans 33, Akron Goodyear Wingfoots 43
- January 7, 1939 @ Akron, OH: Pittsburgh Pirates 29, Akron Goodyear Wingfoots 26
- January 11, 1939 @ Pittsburgh, PA: Akron Goodyear Wingfoots 24, Pittsburgh Pirates 28
- January 14, 1939 @ Warren, PA: Akron Goodyear Wingfoots 33, Warren Penns 29
- January 18, 1939 @ Akron, OH: Akron Firestone Non-Skids 43, Akron Goodyear Wingfoots 31
- January 19, 1939 @ Warren, PA: Akron Goodyear Wingfoots 36, Warren Penns 39
- January 22, 1939 @ Hammond, IN: Akron Goodyear Wingfoots 54, Hammond Ciesar All-Americans 48
- January 24, 1939 @ Akron, OH: Akron Goodyear Wingfoots 25, Oshkosh All-Stars 43
- January 28, 1939 @ Akron, OH: Akron Firestone Non-Skids 38, Akron Goodyear Wingfoots 23
- February 1, 1939 @ Sheboygan, WI: Akron Goodyear Wingfoots 39, Sheboygan Red Skins 36
- February 2, 1939 @ Oshkosh, WI: Akron Goodyear Wingfoots 34, Oshkosh All-Stars 36
- February 7, 1939 @ Akron, OH: Sheboygan Red Skins 19, Akron Goodyear Wingfoots 21
- February 11, 1939: Indianapolis Kautskys 51, Akron Goodyear Wingfoots 50 (OT @ Akron, OH)
- February 15, 1939 @ Akron, OH: Akron Goodyear Wingfoots 40, Akron Firestone Non-Skids 37
- February 16, 1939 @ Rushville, IN: Akron Goodyear Wingfoots 48, Indianapolis Kautskys 52
- February 18, 1939 @ Akron, OH: Pittsburgh Pirates 49, Akron Goodyear Wingfoots 45
- February 25, 1939 @ Akron, OH: Akron Firestone Non-Skids 29, Akron Goodyear Wingfoots 18
- March 2, 1939 @ Akron, OH: Oshkosh All-Stars 34, Akron Goodyear Wingfoots 22

== NBL Playoffs ==
Despite finishing the season under a tied second-place finish with the Warren Penns turned Cleveland White Horses, the defending NBL champion Akron Goodyear Wingfoots would not qualify for the 1939 NBL Playoffs (which was just a championship series match-up this time around between the two best teams of the entire league in terms of records in each division, the Akron Firestone Non-Skids and the Oshkosh All-Stars).

== Awards and honors ==
- Second Team All-NBL – Chuck Bloedorn and Charley Shipp
- All-Time NBL Team – Charley Shipp
