= Deaths in June 1995 =

The following is a list of notable deaths in June 1995.

Entries for each day are listed alphabetically by surname. A typical entry lists information in the following sequence:

- Name, age, country of citizenship at birth, subsequent country of citizenship (if applicable), reason for notability, cause of death (if known), and reference.

== June 1995 ==
=== 1 ===
- Tony Clegg, 58, British property entrepreneur.
- William Robert Collinson, 82, United States District Judge.
- Prudence Hyman, 81, British ballerina and actress.
- Guthorm Kavli, 78, Norwegian architect and art historian.
- Colin Ronan, 74, British author on the history and philosophy of science.

=== 2 ===
- Jack Baggott, 88, Australian rules footballer.
- Lenox Baker, 92, American orthopedic surgeon and pioneer in sports medicine.
- Frank Clack, 83, English professional footballer.
- Benny Jensen, 60, Danish Olympic sports shooter (1968).
- Alexandre de Marenches, 73, French military officer.
- Harper MacKay, 73, American pianist, composer and arranger of music for television and film.
- Kōhei Miyauchi, 65, Japanese actor and voice actor.

=== 3 ===
- Julia Adler, 95, American actress.
- Estelle Brody, 94, American actress.
- Alan Bulman, 67, Australian rules footballer.
- George R. Caron, 75, American crew member of the Enola Gay during the bombing of Hiroshima.
- Aubrey W. Dirlam, 81, American politician.
- J. Presper Eckert, 76, American engineer, leukemia.
- Ralph Friedman, 79, American author.
- Joel Jahn, 61, Finnish Olympic sailor (1956).
- Adolph Lowe, 102, German sociologist and economist.
- Jean-Patrick Manchette, 52, French crime novelist, pancreatic cancer.
- Dilys Powell, 93, British film critic and travel writer.
- Bob Schwartz, 76, American basketball player.
- Edward Scott, 76, English cricketer and rugby union player.
- Arthur K. Shapiro, 72, American psychiatrist and Tourette syndrome expert.
- Paul Wandel, 90, German communist politician and statesman in the German Democratic Republic.
- Frank Waters, 92, American writer and novelist.

=== 4 ===
- Alfred Beni, 72, Austrian chess International Master (IM).
- Ernest Borneman, 80, German writer, sexologist, and musicologist, suicide.
- Lars Brising, 80, Swedish engineer and aircraft designer.
- Leo Cantor, 76, American football player (New York Giants, Chicago Cardinals).
- Sergei Kapustin, 42, Soviet/Russian ice hockey player and Olympian (1976), heart attack.
- Bob Nugent, 79, American basketball player (Syracuse Nationals).
- Ken Phillips, 51, Australian rules footballer.

=== 5 ===
- George Byers, 78, American Olympic sprint canoeist (1956).
- Bernard Chenot, 86, French politician and senior official.
- Patricia Dane, 75, American film actress, lung cancer.
- Trevor N. Dupuy, 79, United States Army officer and military historian, suicide.
- Beatrix Tugendhut Gardner, 87, Austrian zoologist.

=== 6 ===
- Jim Barnes, 86, New Zealand politician of the National Party.
- Werner H. Bloss, 64–65, German scientist and photovoltaics expert.
- Olle Dickson, 94, Swedish Olympic swimmer (1920).
- William Cook Hanson, 86, American judge.
- Sheikh Imam, 76, Egyptian composer and singer.
- Savely Kramarov, 60, Soviet, Russian-American actor, cancer.
- Kenneth Preston, 94, British Olympic sailor (1936, 1952).

=== 7 ===
- Herman Branson, 80, American physicist and chemist.
- Caroline Byrne, 24, Australian model, murdered.
- Hsuan Hua, 77, Chinese-American Buddhist.
- Eddie Lake, 79, American baseball player (St. Louis Cardinals, Boston Red Sox, Detroit Tigers).
- Charles Ritchie, 88, Canadian diplomat and diarist.
- Winston W. Royce, 65, American computer scientist.
- Joseph Tomelty, 84, Irish actor, playwright, novelist, and theatre manager.

=== 8 ===
- Ronald Allridge, 34, American serial killer, execution by lethal injection.
- Erik Beckman, 60, Swedish poet, novelist and playwright.
- Thomas Dudley Cabot, 98, American businessman and politician.
- Truda Grosslichtová, 83, Czechoslovak film actress.
- Juan Carlos Onganía, 81, 35th President of Argentina.
- Abdul Rahman Pazhwak, 76, Afghan poet and diplomat.
- Antonio Saverio, 63, Italian Olympic rower (1952).
- Jerry Zipkin, 80, American socialite.

=== 9 ===
- Frank Chacksfield, 81, English pianist, arranger and orchestra leader, Parkinson's disease.
- Stephen Kaplan, 54, American journalist, paranormal investigator, and vampirologist.
- Walter Landor, 81, German designer and the founder of Landor Associates.
- René Mallieux, 88, Belgian Olympic field hockey player (1928).
- Vivienne Malone-Mayes, 63, American mathematician and professor.
- Paula Jean Myers-Pope, 60, American diver and Olympic medallist (1952, 1956, 1960).
- Lincoln Ragsdale, 68, American civil rights leader.
- N. G. Ranga, 94, Indian freedom fighter, classical liberal, parliamentarian and farmer leader.
- Gordon Rowe, 79, New Zealand cricketer.
- Zoilo Versalles, 55, Cuban baseball player.

=== 10 ===
- Stan Andrews, 78, American baseball player (Boston Bees, Brooklyn Dodgers, Philadelphia Phillies).
- Ali-Asghar Bahari, 89–90, Iranian musician and kamancheh player.
- Mikel Dufrenne, 85, French philosopher and aesthetician.
- Inamul Hasan Kandhlawi, 77, Indian Islamic scholar.
- Bruno Lawrence, 54, English-New Zealand musician and actor, lung cancer.
- Madeleine Moreau, 67, French diver and Olympian (1948, 1952).
- Ronald Morrisby, 80, Tasmanian cricketer.
- Lindsey Nelson, 76, American sportscaster, Parkinson's disease.

=== 11 ===
- Robert Finch, 95, Canadian poet and academic.
- Rodel Naval, 42, Filipino actor, singer, and songwriter, AIDS-related complications.
- Christoph von Fürer-Haimendorf, 85, Austrian ethnologist and professor
- Lovelace Watkins, 62, American singer.

=== 12 ===
- Julius Bürger, 98, Austrian-American composer, pianist and conductor.
- William G. Connare, 83, American prelate of the Roman Catholic Church.
- Talbot Duckmanton, 73, Australian broadcaster and radio and television administrator.
- Arturo Benedetti Michelangeli, 75, Italian pianist.
- Roger Roger, 83, French arranger, composer and conductor.
- Pierre Russell, 45, American basketball player (Kentucky Colonels).
- Egon Svensson, 81, Swedish bantamweight Greco-Roman wrestler and Olympian (1936).
- Ede Vadászi, 71, Hungarian Olympic basketball player (1948).

=== 13 ===
- Enrique Alarcón, 78, Spanish art director active in film.
- Jean Lee Latham, 93, American writer.
- David Parry, 52, British-Canadian folk musician, actor, stage director, and academic, heart attack.
- Ginger Smock, 75, American violinist and orchestra leader.

=== 14 ===
- Els Aarne, 78, Estonian composer.
- Jack Chertok, 88, American film and television producer.
- Paul Coleman, 79, American basketball player.
- Rory Gallagher, 47, Irish blues and rock guitarist, liver failure.
- Bobby Grim, 70, American racecar driver, cancer.
- Edwin Healy, 85, Australian cricketer.
- Rangimārie Hetet, 103, New Zealand Māori master weaver.
- Jos Hoevenaers, 62, Belgian cyclist.
- Timothy Scott, 57, American actor (Butch Cassidy and the Sundance Kid, Footloose, Fried Green Tomatoes), heart attack.
- Sony Lab'ou Tansi, 48, Congolese novelist, playwright, and poet, AIDS-related complications.
- Robert Wenman, 54, Canadian politician, member of the House of Commons of Canada (1974-1993).
- Roger Zelazny, 58, American science fiction writer, colorectal cancer.

=== 15 ===
- Robert Anderson, 76, American gospel singer and composer.
- John Vincent Atanasoff, 91, American physicist and inventor of the first digital computer, stroke.
- Charles Bennett, 95, English screenwriter.
- P. K. Chishala, 37-38, Zambian musician.
- Lloyd Doran, 74, Canadian ice hockey player (Detroit Red Wings).
- E. Bronson Ingram II, 63, American billionaire heir, filantropist, and businessman, cancer.
- Fotis Kosmas, 68, Greek Olympic athlete (1952).
- Preben Lerdorff Rye, 78, Danish film actor.

=== 16 ===
- Vladimir Aleksenko, 72, Soviet Air Force general.
- Thomas Bolger, 90, Australian Olympic wrestler (1928).
- Robert Cope, 83, American basketball player.
- Tore Edman, 90, Swedish ski jumper.
- Syd Einfeld, 85, Australian politician and Jewish community leader.
- Harold Hawke, 85, Australian rules footballer.
- Nikolay Kuchurin, 67, Soviet Russian Olympic middle-distance runner (1952).
- Senu Abdul Rahman, 76, Malaysian politician, minister and diplomat.
- Jack Wagner, 69, American radio personality and actor.

=== 17 ===
- Danny Brown, 69, American NFL football player (Washington Redskins).
- Bruce Campbell, 85, American baseball player.
- David Ennals, Baron Ennals, 72, British politician and human rights activist, pancreatic cancer.
- Clarence Greene, 81, American screenwriter and film producer.
- Mary Kirkwood, 90, American artist and professor.
- Ike Klingbeil, 86, American ice hockey player (Chicago Black Hawks).
- Kalevi Laitinen, 75, Finnish Olympic speed skater (1948, 1952).
- Herb Naismith, 79, Australian rules footballer.
- Claire Sterling, 75, American author and journalist.
- Kim Dongni, 81, South Korean writer.
- Julie Tan, 65, Singaporean activist, lung cancer.
- Shaul Yisraeli, 85, Belarusian Orthodox rabbi.
- Bob Young, 52, American gridiron football player.

=== 18 ===
- Karl Atzenroth, 99, German politician and businessman.
- Keith Bennett, 64, Canadian football player.
- Arthur Howard, 85, British character actor.
- Frank Mario, 74, Canadian ice hockey player (Boston Bruins).
- Robert Schlienz, 71, German football player.
- Harry Tisch, 68, East German politician and trade unionist, heart failure.

=== 19 ===
- Józef Arkusz, 74, Polish film director and producer.
- Luis Caballero, 51, Colombian painter, watercolourist, pastellist and lithographer.
- Ernie Danjean, 61, American football player (Green Bay Packers, Hamilton Tiger-Cats, Calgary Stampeders).
- Murray Dickie, 71, Scottish tenor.
- David Griggs, 28, American gridiron football player (Miami Dolphins, San Diego Chargers), traffic accident.
- Adélard Lafrance, 82, Canadian ice hockey player (Montreal Canadiens).
- Richard Pape, 79, British writer and POW escaper .
- Władysław Śmigielski, 57, Polish Olympic field hockey player (1960).
- Peter Townsend, 80, British RAF officer and flying ace and romantic partner to Princess Margaret, stomach cancer.

=== 20 ===
- Julian Blaustein, 82, American film producer, cancer.
- Emil Cioran, 84, Romanian philosopher and essayist, Alzheimer's disease.
- Harry Gwala, 74, South African activist and politician.
- Al Hansen, 67, American artist and member of the Fluxus movement.
- Anne Tabachnick, 67, American painter, pancreatic cancer.
- Albert Wyckmans, 97, Belgian Olympic cyclist (1920).

=== 21 ===
- Al Adamson, 65, American filmmaker and actor, homicide.
- John Charles, 59, Australian rules footballer.
- Darnell Collins, 33, American spree killer, shot.
- Jerry Fairbanks, 90, American film and television director and producer.
- Gianni Ghidini, 65, Italian Olympic cyclist (1952).
- Laurence McKinley Gould, 98, American geologist and polar explorer.
- Larry Griffin, 40, American convicted murderer, execution by lethal injection.
- Jun Hamamura, 89, Japanese actor.
- Claude Hauet, 70, French Olympic field hockey player (1948, 1952).
- Tristan Jones, 66, British sailor and author.
- Ulrich Thein, 65, German actor, film director and screenwriter.
- Claire Vautrin, 78, French Olympic canoeist (1948).

=== 22 ===
- Raúl Astor, 70, Mexican actor, director, producer and announcer.
- Yves Congar, 91, French catholic cardinal.
- Leonid Derbenyov, 64, Soviet/Russian poet and lyricist, stomach cancer.
- Nils-Joel Englund, 88, Swedish cross-country skier and Olympian (1936).
- Gerhard Nenning, 54, Austrian former alpine skier and Olympian (1964, 1968).

=== 23 ===
- Harvey Barnett, 69, Australian intelligence officer.
- Marvin Camras, 79, electrical engineer and inventor, kidney failure.
- Francesco Camusso, 87, Italian professional road racing cyclist.
- Morris Cohen, 84, American who was a spy for the Soviet Union.
- Atef El Tayeb, 47, Egyptian film director, cardiovascular disease.
- Roger Grimsby, 66, American television news reporter and journalist, lung cancer.
- Rusty Peden, 79, Canadian Olympic cyclist (1936).
- Sailor Roberts, 64, American poker player.
- Tony Romeo, 56, American songwriter, heart attack.
- Jonas Salk, 80, American medical researcher, heart failure.
- Emile Santiago, 96, American costume designer.
- Anatoly Tarasov, 76, Russian ice hockey player and coach.

=== 24 ===
- Inshan Ali, 45, Trinidadian cricketer.
- James Batten, 59, American journalist and publisher, brain tumor, brain cancer.
- Marjorie Cameron, 73, American artist, poet, actress and occultist, brain tumor.
- Robert Guthrie, 78, American microbiologist.
- Henri Hollanders, 72, Belgian Olympic basketball player (1948).
- Herbert Nürnberg, 80, German boxer.
- Alec Proudfoot, 88, Australian rules footballer.
- Esther Rome, 49, American women's health activist and writer, breast cancer.
- Andrew J. Transue, 92, American attorney and politician, member of the United States House of Representatives (1937-1939).
- Meir Zorea, 72, Israeli general and politician.

=== 25 ===
- Neil Begg, 80, New Zealand paediatrician, historian and cricketer.
- Moshe Ben-Ze'ev, 83, Israeli jurist and Attorney General.
- Warren E. Burger, 87, 15th Chief Justice of the United States Supreme Court, heart attack.
- Frank Jorgensen, 92, Australian rules footballer.
- Li Jukui, 90, Chinese general and politician.
- Qiu Miaojin, 26, Taiwanese novelist, suicide.
- Sergei Popov, 64, Soviet Russian marathon runner and Olympian (1960).
- Lim Shiow Rong, 6, Singaporean murder victim.
- Ernest Walton, 91, Irish physicist.

=== 26 ===
- Lucia Bercescu-Țurcanu, 84, Romanian-born American soprano
- John Jefferson Bray, 82, Australian lawyer, judge, and academic.
- Jason Callahan, 19, American man and unidentified body and missing person case.
- William Lindeque, 84, South African Olympic sprinter (1936).
- T.C. Narayanan Nambiar, 80, Indian politician, age related issues.
- Kazimierz Wichniarz, 80, Polish film and theatre actor.
- Edgar Williams, 82, British Army military intelligence officer and historian.

=== 27 ===
- Jacques Berque, 85, French Islamic scholar and sociologist.
- Yoni Chen, 41, Israeli actor, voice actor, and puppeteer, AIDS.
- Efrem Kurtz, 94, Russian conductor.
- Nida Senff, 75, Dutch backstroke swimmer and Olympic champion (1936).
- Dominic Tang, 87, Chinese Jesuit priest, pneumonia.
- Gordon Wilson, 69, Irish politician and pacifist, heart attack.

=== 28 ===
- Philip Bonsal, 92, American diplomat with the U.S. Department of State.
- Arne Mattsson, 75, Swedish film director.
- Maurinho, 62, Brazilian football player.
- Donald Sinclair, 84, British veterinary surgeon who was the inspiration for All Creatures Great and Small, suicide.

=== 29 ===
- Ted Allan, 79, Canadian screenwriter, author, and poet.
- Francisco Avitia, 80, Mexican singer.
- Jules Cottenier, 90, French footballer.
- Noel Dyson, 78, English actress, cancer.
- Ken Haycraft, 88, American football player (Green Bay Packers).
- Sicco Mansholt, 86, Dutch politician.
- José María Pagoaga, 43, Spanish Olympic handball player (1980).
- Roy Rowland, 84, American film director for MGM.
- Lana Turner, 74, American actress (Peyton Place, Imitation of Life, The Postman Always Rings Twice), esophageal cancer.
- Bill Widenhouse, 66, American racing driver.

=== 30 ===
- Georgy Beregovoy, 74, Russian cosmonaut (Soyuz 3).
- Roger Chapelet, 91, French maritime painter.
- Gale Gordon, 89, American actor (The Lucy Show, Our Miss Brooks, The 'Burbs), lung cancer.
- Phyllis Hyman, 45, American singer and actress, suicide.
- Ya'akov Meridor, 81, Israeli politician, Irgun commander and businessman.
- Mario Monticelli, 93, Italian chess player.
- Jorge Peixinho, 55, Portuguese composer, pianist and conductor.
- Barney Simon, 63, South African theatre director and writer.
- Gavriil Troyepolsky, 89, Soviet/Russian writer.
- Nazariy Yaremchuk, 43, Soviet/Ukrainian Hutsul singer.
