= 1937–38 Akron Goodyear Wingfoots season =

NBL professional basketball team season

- NBL champions
- Head coach: Lefty Byers
- Owner: Goodyear
- Arena: Goodyear Hall

Results
- Record: 13–5 (.722)
- Place: Division: 2nd (Eastern)
- Playoff finish: NBL champions (Won 2–1 over Oshkosh All-Stars)

The 1937–38 Akron Goodyear Wingfoots season was the Goodyear Wingfoots' inaugural, professional year in the United States' National Basketball League (NBL), which was also the first year the league existed. However, if you include their previous seasons of existence as an independent team, alongside seasons where they competed in the Amateur Athletic Union, the National Industrial League (not to be confused with the National Industrial Basketball League that they would later compete in, with the Goodyear Wingfoots winning a championship in the NIL in 1932), and what were considered to be predecessors to the NBL in the National Professional Basketball League and the Midwest Basketball Conference (the latter of which the Goodyear Wingfoots won that league's final championship under that name before it folded operations and was considered to be rebranded as the NBL according to some basketball historians), this season would officially be considered their 20th season of play as a team. Thirteen teams competed in the NBL, comprising six teams in the Eastern Division (Akron Goodyear's division) and seven teams in the Western Division (with one of them being a team that would rebrand themselves after playing only three regular season games). The Wingfoots were one of two teams from Akron, Ohio in the league, with the other team also being considered a works team in the Akron Firestone Non-Skids.

The Wingfoots played their home games at the Goodyear Hall. They finished the season with a 13–5 record, placing second in the Eastern Division behind the Akron Firestone Non-Skids. However, they not only swept the Firestone Non-Skids in two straight games played in the Eastern Division Playoffs, but also went on to win the win the league's championship series against the Western Division's Oshkosh All-Stars, two games to one in a best-of-three series.

Head coach Lefty Byers won the league's first Coach of the Year Award, while players Chuck Bloedorn and Charley Shipp earned First Team All-NBL honors.

== Roster ==
1937–38 Akron Goodyear Wingfoots roster
Players

| Pos. | No. | Player | Height | Weight | DOB | From |
|---|---|---|---|---|---|---|
| F | | Wesley Bennett | 6 ft 3 in (1.91 m) | 175 lb (79 kg) | 1913–03-31 | Westminster (PA) |
| G | | Chuck Bloedorn | 6 ft 0 in (1.83 m) | 180 lb (82 kg) | 1912–05–28 | Illinois Tech |
| F/C | | Robert Cope | 6 ft 4 in (1.93 m) | 190 lb (86 kg) | 1911–09–03 | Mount Union |
| G/F | | Wilson Fitts | 6 ft 2 in (1.88 m) | 165 lb (75 kg) | 1915–06–16 | Akron |
| G | | Leroy Lins | 6 ft 1 in (1.85 m) | 175 lb (79 kg) | 1913–06–21 | Rutgers |
| G | | Johnny McAdams | 5 ft 10 in (1.78 m) | 147 lb (67 kg) | 1912–04–15 | Ohio Wesleyan |
| C | | Dean Mealy | 6 ft 4 in (1.93 m) | 195 lb (88 kg) | 1915–05–07 | Muskingum |
| F/C | | Ray Morstadt | 6 ft 2 in (1.88 m) | 220 lb (100 kg) | 1913–03–10 | Marquette |
| F | | Russ Ochsenhirt | 6 ft 3 in (1.91 m) | 195 lb (88 kg) | 1912–04–16 | Pittsburgh |
| F | | Mal Rush | 6 ft 0 in (1.83 m) | 170 lb (77 kg) | 1909–04–02 | Bethany (WV) |
| G/F | | Charley Shipp | 6 ft 1 in (1.85 m) | 200 lb (91 kg) | 1913–12–03 | Catholic |
| G/F | | Chelso Tamagno | 5 ft 10 in (1.78 m) | 185 lb (84 kg) | 1912–03–20 | Michigan |

Coaches
Head coach
- Lefty Byers

Legend
- (DP) Unsigned draft pick
- (FA) Free agent
- (S) Suspended
- Injured

Roster

Note: Leroy Lins and Ray Morstadt were not on the playoffs roster.

== Regular season ==
=== Season standings ===
| Pos. | Eastern Division | Wins | Losses | Win % |
|---|---|---|---|---|
| 1 | Akron Firestone Non-Skids | 14 | 4 | .778 |
| 2 | Akron Goodyear Wingfoots | 13 | 5 | .722 |
| 3 | Pittsburgh Pirates | 8 | 5 | .615 |
| 4 | Buffalo Bisons | 3 | 6 | .333 |
| 5 | Warren Penns | 3 | 9 | .250 |
| 6 | Columbus Athletic Supply | 1 | 12 | .091 |

=== NBL Schedule ===
- December 8, 1937 @ Pittsburgh, PA: Akron Goodyear Wingfoots 30, Pittsburgh Pirates 26
- December 10, 1937 @ Akron, OH: Buffalo Bisons 19, Akron Goodyear Wingfoots 36
- December 18, 1937 @ Akron, OH: Whiting Ciesar All-Americans 28, Akron Goodyear Wingfoots 29
- December 22, 1937 @ Kankakee, IL: Akron Goodyear Wingfoots 45, Kankakee Gallagher Trojans 26
- December 23, 1937 @ Fort Wayne, IN: Akron Goodyear Wingfoots 25, Fort Wayne General Electrics 29
- December 28, 1937 @ Kankakee, IL: Indianapolis Kautskys 31, Akron Goodyear Wingfoots 34
- January 1, 1938 @ Akron, OH: Pittsburgh Pirates 33, Akron Goodyear Wingfoots 44
- January 2, 1938 @ Buffalo, NY: Akron Goodyear Wingfoots 40, Buffalo Bisons 29
- January 3, 1938 @ Warren, PA: Akron Goodyear Wingfoots 43, Warren Penns 23
- January 9, 1938 @ Columbus, OH: Akron Goodyear Wingfoots 38, Columbus Athletic Supply 21
- January 15, 1938 @ Akron, OH: Akron Goodyear Wingfoots 30, Akron Firestone Non-Skids 35
- January 16, 1938 @ Indianapolis, IN: Akron Goodyear Wingfoots 31, Indianapolis Kautskys 33
- January 19, 1938 @ Akron, OH: Kankakee Gallagher Trojans 22, Akron Goodyear Wingfoots 37
- January 22, 1938 @ Akron, OH: Fort Wayne General Electrics 22, Akron Goodyear Wingfoots 28
- January 28, 1938 @ Akron, OH: Warren Penns 17, Akron Goodyear Wingfoots 42
- January 31, 1938 @ Akron, OH: Akron Firestone Non-Skids 43, Akron Goodyear Wingfoots 42
- February 11, 1938 @ Oshkosh, WI: Akron Goodyear Wingfoots 29, Oshkosh All-Stars 39
- February 18, 1938 @ Akron, OH: Columbus Athletic Supply 18, Akron Goodyear Wingfoots 31

== NBL Playoffs ==
=== NBL Eastern Division Playoff ===
(E2) Akron Goodyear Wingfoots vs. (E1) Akron Firestone Non-Skids: Goodyear Wingfoots win series 2–0

- Game 1: February 24, 1938 @ Goodyear Wingfoots: Goodyear Wingfoots 26, Firestone Non-Skids 21
- Game 2: February 25, 1938 @ Firestone Non-Skids: Goodyear Wingfoots 37, Firestone Non-Skids 31

=== NBL Championship ===
(E2) Akron Goodyear Wingfoots vs. (W1) Oshkosh All-Stars: Goodyear Wingfoots win series 2–1

- Game 1: February 28, 1938 @ Oshkosh: Akron 29, Oshkosh 28
- Game 2: March 3, 1938 @ Akron: Oshkosh 39, Akron 31
- Game 3: March 4, 1938 @ Akron: Akron 35, Oshkosh 27

== Awards and honors ==
- NBL Coach of the Year – Lefty Byers
- All-NBL First Team – Chuck Bloedorn and Charley Shipp
- All-Time NBL Team – Charley Shipp
