= 1937–38 Columbus Athletic Supply season =

NBL professional basketball team season

- Head coach: Cookie Cunningham (player-coach)
- Owner: Columbus Athletic Supplies
- Arena: Ohio State Fairgrounds Arena (Taft Coliseum?)

Results
- Record: 1–12 (.077)
- Place: Division: 6th (Eastern)
- Playoff finish: Did not qualify

The 1937–38 Columbus Athletic Supply season was the first and only professional season for the Columbus Athletic Supply team (who were owned and operated by the business of the same name) in Columbus, Ohio under the National Basketball League, which officially was the first season that it existed as a professional basketball league after previously existing as a semi-pro or amateur basketball league called the Midwest Basketball Conference in its first two seasons back in 1935. However, if you include their first season when they existed in the Midwest Basketball Conference as the Columbus Athletic Supply team under its second and final season of existence as a league under that name before its rebranding to the NBL, this would actually be this team's second season of play as a team (at least) instead.

The Columbus Athletic Supply team would be one of nine MBC teams from the previous season (one of ten overall MBC teams if you include the original Buffalo Bisons NBL team) to join the inaugural NBL season as it rebranded itself from the MBC to the NBL professional basketball league, with the Richmond King Clothiers / Cincinnati Comellos, Kankakee Gallagher Trojans, and the Oshkosh All-Stars (the last team by December 1937) being the only non-MBC teams joining the NBL for this season. Not only that, but they were also one of six teams to compete in the Eastern Division this season, with them representing thirteen inaugural NBL teams to compete in the first season under the NBL name, comprising six teams competing in the Eastern Division and seven teams competing in the Western Division.

Entering this season, the Columbus Athletic Supply squad that had gone 6–5 in their previous season in the MBC would utilize their roster with the starting line-up of the 1936–37 Otterbein College team that had gone 11–5 that season alongside players from Ohio State University in their previous season. Despite their standing as an NBL team at the time, they would play only three NBL scheduled games in the year 1937 (which were a weirdly scheduled doubleheader held in both Dayton and Columbus, Ohio, respectively on December 26 that year and a December 29 game against the Akron Firestone Non-Skids) before the Oshkosh All-Stars finally were able to play in the NBL properly in January 1938. By that point in time, they would start the season with a 1–2 record by winning only one home game in the season against the Dayton Metropolitans before losing the rest of the games they played in their season, including two matches they had scheduled being forfeited later in the season to both the Akron Firestone Non-Skids and Fort Wayne General Electrics works teams. As a result, not only would they easily fail to qualify for the inaugural NBL Playoffs, but they would also have the official record for the worst record in NBL history (albeit with the asterisk of no set schedules being in mind for every NBL team this season), with their 1–12 record being worse than the Detroit Gems' future overall record of 4–40 in terms of win percentages, excluding the four straight losses that the 1942–43 Toledo Jim White Chevrolets had. As a result of their failures as a team this season, Columbus was one of six NBL teams to fold operations or otherwise leave the NBL following this season's conclusion, with the Columbus Athletic Supply team being a barnstorming team for a few more seasons (up until 1940) instead. Interestingly, one of the players on the team during the season, Gene Scholz, later revealed that he didn't even know that the Columbus Athletic Supply team was playing professional basketball games this season since he didn't know what was going on there and that he was just picking up a few extra dollars on the side playing basketball during this season of play.

== Roster ==
Please note that due to the way records for professional basketball leagues like the NBL and the ABL were recorded at the time, some information on both teams and players may be harder to list out than usual here.

Player	Position
Clyde Anton	G
Beanie Berens	C
Sam Busich	G-F
Cookie Cunningham	F-C
Denny Elliot	PG
Herbie Hutchisson	PG
Buck Lamme	G-F
Sam Loucks	F-C
Bob McConnell	G-F
Woody Pitzer	G
Gene Scholz	G
Jack Sullivan	G-F
Norm Wagner	C

In addition to them, there were also two unknown individuals with the last names of Miller and Price who each played one game for Columbus that would not have proper credit for their sole appearances on the team otherwise.

== Regular season ==
=== NBL Season standings ===
Pos.	Eastern Division	Wins	Losses	Win %
1	Akron Firestone Non-Skids	14	4	.778
2	Akron Goodyear Wingfoots	13	5	.722
3	Pittsburgh Pirates	8	5	.615
4	Buffalo Bisons	3	6	.333
5	Warren Penns	3	9	.250
6	Columbus Athletic Supply	1	12	.091

=== NBL Schedule ===
An official database created by John Grasso detailing every NBL match possible (outside of two matches that the Kankakee Gallagher Trojans won over the Dayton Metropolitans in 1938) would be released in 2026 showcasing every team's official schedules throughout their time spent in the NBL. As such, these are the official results recorded for the Columbus Athletic Supply team in their only season in the NBL.

- December 26, 1937 (Game 1 @ Dayton, OH): Columbus Athletic Supply 22, Dayton Metropolitans 23
- December 26, 1937 (Game 2 @ Columbus, OH): Dayton Metropolitans 28, Columbus Athletic Supply 31
- December 29, 1937 @ Akron, OH: Columbus Athletic Supply 33, Akron Firestone Non-Skids 52
- January 2, 1938 @ Columbus, OH: Pittsburgh Pirates 41, Columbus Athletic Supply 37
- January 9, 1938 @ Columbus, OH: Akron Goodyear Wingfoots 38, Columbus Athletic Supply 17
- January 16: 1938 @ Columbus, OH: Buffalo Bisons 45, Columbus Athletic Supply 26
- January 19, 1938 @ Pittsburgh, PA: Columbus Athletic Supply 34, Pittsburgh Pirates 59
- January 23, 1938 (Game 1 @ Cincinnati, OH): Cincinnati Comellos 31, Columbus Athletic Supply 16
- January 23, 1938 (Game 2 @ Cincinnati, OH): Cincinnati Comellos 28, Columbus Athletic Supply 22
- January 23, 1938 (Planned Game 3 @ Columbus, OH): The Fort Wayne General Electrics would win the match they had scheduled that day over the Columbus Athletic Supply by forfeiture. (As such, 2–0 favoring Fort Wayne would be the official recorded score for this match.)
- February 3, 1938 @ Columbus, OH: Fort Wayne General Electrics 50, Columbus Athletic Supply 22
- February 18, 1938 @ Akron, OH: Columbus Athletic Supply 18, Akron Goodyear Wingfoots 31
- February 20, 1938 (Planned Game (1) @ Columbus or Akron, OH): The Akron Firestone Non-Skids win over the Columbus Athletic Supply team by forfeiture. (As such, 2–0 favoring the Akron Firestone Non-Skids would be the official recorded score for this match.)
