= 1937–38 Buffalo Bisons season =

NBL professional basketball team season

- Head coach: Alfred Heerdt
- General manager: Alfred Heerdt
- Owner: Alfred Heerdt
- Arena: Broadway Auditorium

Results
- Record: 3–6 (.333)
- Place: Division: 4th (Eastern)
- Playoff finish: Did not qualify (Would not play over 10 games this season.)

The 1937–38 Buffalo Bisons season was the first and only professional basketball season of play for the original Buffalo Bisons NBL team in the city of Buffalo, New York under the National Basketball League, which officially was the first season that it existed as a professional basketball league after previously existing as a semi-pro or amateur basketball league called the Midwest Basketball Conference in its first two seasons back in 1935. However, if you include the time when they joined the Midwest Basketball Conference in its first season of existence (and only its first season of existence), as well as their season before that where they played in the New York State Basketball League (sometimes using the Buffalo Lincolns name in the process there) alongside the multiple independent seasons they had as a team (including potential seasons where they used the Buffalo Drydocks name instead) and potentially one season where they even played in the original American Basketball League back when it was first created (sometimes even being referred to as the Buffalo Germans there), this would officially be considered at least their twelfth and final season of existence (or at the very least, their eighth and final season of existence) as a team. However, it has been considered possible that the original Buffalo Bisons team starting from the original ABL days actually first began as the original Buffalo Germans barnstorming team from 1895 (four years after the invention of the sport of basketball itself by James Naismith) before "disbanding" around the same time the Buffalo Bisons first existed instead, meaning their actual team history alongside an apparent team merger with another Buffalo basketball franchise would actually make this either their 42nd or 38th (depending on whether one would count seasons after their only ABL season before their first known independent season as the Bisons as official seasons or not) and final season of play instead. If you include the team's first season in the Midwest Basketball Conference (and only that season of play for the MBC), they would also be one of ten teams there in its history to move into the NBL in its inaugural season under that new name. Despite this team later having the same name as the team that would briefly appear once again in the NBL by 1946, the team that eventually became the present-day Atlanta Hawks of the NBA would not have the same history as this Buffalo Bisons team under this season of play. In any case, the Bisons would be one of ten inaugural NBL teams that had ties to the Midwest Basketball Conference precursor league to join the since rebranded National Basketball League (with Buffalo being the only MBC team to leave the league in its second season before return to join the since-rebranded NBL), as well as one of six teams to compete in the Eastern Division this season. They represented thirteen inaugural NBL teams to compete in the first season under the NBL name, six in the Eastern Division and seven in the Western Division.

This season was officially considered the debut season of future Hall of Famer Al Cervi, a former Buffalo East High School standout player that left the amateur YMCA standings to play professionally this season and would subsequently prove to be a key player (and later, head coach) in his later NBL/NBA career while staying within the state of New York by that point in time. Despite the leadership of a young Al Cervi and a much older Alfred Heerdt within the team, however, the Bisons would prove to have a poor season with a 3–6 record concluding their surprisingly short season (with them already going over their halfway point of their short NBL season with a 1–4 record before the new Oshkosh All-Stars NBL team played their first scheduled NBL games in January 1938), with no known explanation for why the Bisons played only nine total games this season outside of maybe the collapse of the Honeymoon Bridge during this period of time or bad snowstorms being in mind. While it would be good enough for a fourth-place finish in the Eastern Division behind only the newly rebranded Pittsburgh Pirates and the two Akron, Ohio-based professional works teams in the Goodyear Wingfoots and the Firestone Non-Skids, it would not be anywhere near worthwhile enough to qualify for a playoff spot in the inaugural NBL Playoffs. Even if the NBL did allow for four teams to compete in their inaugural playoff season, the Bisons would only play nine total games in their sole season there (with them getting a decent 2–2 record at home, but a terrible 1–4 record on the road), which wouldn't have allowed them to qualify for the NBL Playoffs this season anyway due to the bare minimum of games played for a playoff spot looking to be a total of at least 13 scheduled NBL games played in their season. Following the conclusion of this season, the Buffalo Bisons would be one of six teams in the NBL to either fold operations or otherwise leave the NBL altogether (joining the Columbus Athletic Supply team, the Dayton Metropolitans, the Fort Wayne General Electrics, the Kankakee Gallagher Trojans, and the Richmond King Clothiers / Cincinnati Comellos), with the Bisons franchise appearing to fold operations on their ends (and subsequently appearing to end what would be a 38 or 42-year long history for the franchise if their history as an apparent continuation of the original Buffalo Germans is anything to go by), although it is suggested the Buffalo Bisons continued to play until at least the 1940–41 season. A new Buffalo Bisons team would later appear for the 1946–47 NBL season, but they would only play there for 13 games in 1946 (while likely not having any relationship to this Buffalo Bisons team) before moving to Moline, Illinois to what was considered a part of the Tri-Cities area at the time to be named the Tri-Cities Blackhawks for the rest of that season starting on Christmas 1946 (though officially using that name by New Year's Day of 1947 following a name that team contest there).

== Roster ==
Please note that due to the way records for professional basketball leagues like the NBL and the ABL were recorded at the time, some information on both teams and players may be harder to list out than usual here.

Player	Position
Dan Carnevale	G
Al Cervi	G-F
Paul Coleman	G
Bill Jackson	G-F
Johnny Lenhart	F-C
Eddie Malanowicz	C
Jim O'Donnell	F-C
Neil O'Donnell	F-C
Stan Raiman	G-F
Bello Snyder	G-F

== Regular season ==
=== NBL Season standings ===
Pos.	Eastern Division	Wins	Losses	Win %
1	Akron Firestone Non-Skids	14	4	.778
2	Akron Goodyear Wingfoots	13	5	.722
3	Pittsburgh Pirates	8	5	.615
4	Buffalo Bisons	3	6	.333
5	Warren Penns	3	9	.250
6	Columbus Athletic Supply	1	12	.091

=== NBL Schedule ===
An official database created by John Grasso detailing every NBL match possible (outside of two matches that the Kankakee Gallagher Trojans won over the Dayton Metropolitans in 1938) would be released in 2026 showcasing every team's official schedules throughout their time spent in the NBL. As such, these are the official results recorded for the original Buffalo Bisons NBL team in their only season in the NBL.

- November 28, 1937 @ Buffalo, NY: Akron Firestone Non-Skids 21, Buffalo Bisons 19 (Experimented with using 3 periods that were 15 minutes of length similar to the rivaling American Basketball League as opposed to the more typical 4 quarters that would be 10 minutes long on the NBL's end for their games.)
- December 1, 1937 @ Pittsburgh, PA: Pittsburgh Pirates 34, Buffalo Bisons 28
- December 5, 1937 @ Buffalo, NY: Pittsburgh Pirates 26, Buffalo Bisons 27
- December 10, 1937 @ Akron, OH: Buffalo Bisons 19, Akron Goodyear Wingfoots 36
- December 18, 1937 @ Warren, PA: Buffalo Bisons 25, Warren Penns 33
- December 26, 1937 @ Buffalo, NY: Warren Penns 21, Buffalo Bisons 33 (Experimented with using 3 periods that were 15 minutes of length similar to the rivaling American Basketball League as opposed to the more typical 4 quarters that would be 10 minutes long on the NBL's end for their games.)
- January 2, 1938 @ Buffalo, NY: Akron Goodyear Wingfoots 40, Buffalo Bisons 29
- January 5, 1938 @ Akron, OH: Buffalo Bisons 37, Akron Firestone Non-Skids 38
- January 16, 1938 @ Columbus, OH: Columbus Athletic Supply 26, Buffalo Bisons 45

Buffalo would also lose a match against the Dayton Metropolitans sometime in January 1938 with a 23–28 final score, though that match was actually considered to be an exhibition match instead of an official NBL scheduled match as one place had originally sourced it as.

=== Awards and honors ===
- Al Cervi – NBL All-Time Team
