= List of NBA players (M) =

This is a list of National Basketball Association players whose last names begin with M.

The list also includes players from the American National Basketball League (NBL), the Basketball Association of America (BAA), and the original American Basketball Association (ABA). All of these leagues contributed to the formation of the present-day NBA.

Individuals who played in the NBL prior to its 1949 merger with the BAA are listed in italics, as they are not traditionally listed in the NBA's official player registers.

== M ==
- Sheldon Mac
- Mike Macaluso
- Ed Macauley
- Todd MacCulloch
- Ronnie MacGilvray
- Scott Machado
- Arvydas Macijauskas
- Oliver Mack
- Sam Mack
- Shelvin Mack
- Malcolm Mackey
- Rudy Macklin
- Vernon Macklin
- Johnny Macknowski
- Don MacLean
- Bob MacLeod
- Daryl Macon
- Mark Macon
- J. P. Macura
- Kyle Macy
- Jack Maddox
- Tito Maddox
- Gerald Madkins
- Mark Madsen
- Norm Mager
- Josh Magette
- Corey Maggette
- Dave Magley
- Jamaal Magloire
- Will Magnay
- Randolph Mahaffey
- Ian Mahinmi
- John Mahnken
- Brian Mahoney
- Francis Mahoney
- Rick Mahorn
- Dan Majerle
- Renaldo Major
- Thon Maker
- Paul Maki
- Red Malackany
- Lionel Malamed
- Eddie Malanowicz
- Théo Maledon
- Johnny Malokas
- Jeff Malone
- Karl Malone
- Moses Malone
- Matt Maloney
- Steve Malovic
- Mike Maloy
- Khaman Maluach
- Sandro Mamukelashvili
- Ted Manakas
- John Mandic
- Karim Mané
- Frank Mangiapane
- Terance Mann
- Tre Mann
- Danny Manning
- Ed Manning
- Guy Manning
- Rich Manning
- Nico Mannion
- Pace Mannion
- Chris Mañon
- Nick Mantis
- Aday Mara
- Pete Maravich
- Press Maravich
- Devyn Marble
- Roy Marble
- Stephon Marbury
- Šarūnas Marčiulionis
- Saul Mariaschin
- Jack Marin
- Shawn Marion
- Boban Marjanović
- Lauri Markkanen
- Damir Markota
- Bogoljub Marković
- Sean Marks
- Harvey Marlatt
- Jim Marsh
- Ricky Marsh
- Donny Marshall
- Donyell Marshall
- Kendall Marshall
- Naji Marshall
- Rawle Marshall
- Tom Marshall
- Vester Marshall
- Alijah Martin
- Bill Martin
- Bob Martin
- Brian Martin
- Caleb Martin
- Cartier Martin
- Cody Martin
- Cuonzo Martin
- Darrick Martin
- Dino Martin
- Don Martin
- Fernando Martín
- Jarell Martin
- Jaylen Martin
- Jeff Martin
- Jeremiah Martin
- Kelan Martin
- Kenyon Martin
- Kenyon Martin Jr.
- Kevin Martin
- LaRue Martin
- Maurice Martin
- Phil Martin
- Slater Martin
- Tyrese Martin
- Whitey Martin
- Nick Martinelli
- Jahmai Mashack
- Jamal Mashburn
- Al Masino
- Anthony Mason
- Desmond Mason
- Frank Mason III
- Joel Mason
- Roger Mason Jr.
- Tony Massenburg
- Eddie Mast
- Yante Maten
- Garrison Mathews
- Mangok Mathiang
- Dakota Mathias
- Johnny Mathis
- Bennedict Mathurin
- Karlo Matković
- Wes Matthews
- Wesley Matthews
- Ariel Maughan
- Frank Maury
- Marlon Maxey
- Tyrese Maxey
- Jason Maxiell
- Cedric Maxwell
- Vernon Maxwell
- Don May
- Scott May
- Sean May
- Lee Mayberry
- Clyde Mayes
- Tharon Mayes
- Bill Mayfield
- Ken Mayfield
- Eric Maynor
- O. J. Mayo
- Skylar Mays
- Travis Mays
- Matt Mazza
- Luc Mbah a Moute
- Bez Mbeng
- D. J. Mbenga
- Johnny McAdams
- Bob McAdoo
- James Michael McAdoo
- Ken McBride
- Miles McBride
- Bill McCahan
- Jared McCain
- Tahjere McCall
- Ray McCallum, Jr.
- Bob McCann
- Brendan McCann
- Mel McCants
- Rashad McCants
- Mike McCarron
- Andre McCarter
- Willie McCarter
- Johnny McCarthy
- Howie McCarty
- Kelly McCarty
- Walter McCarty
- Amal McCaskill
- Patrick McCaw
- Dwayne McClain
- Ted McClain
- Dan McClintock
- Jack McCloskey
- George McCloud
- Mac McClung
- CJ McCollum
- Gordon McComb
- John McConathy
- Bucky McConnell
- T. J. McConnell
- Keith McCord
- Tim McCormick
- Jelani McCoy
- Paul McCracken
- Chris McCray
- Rodney McCray
- Scooter McCray
- Erik McCree
- Kevin McCullar Jr.
- Chris McCullough
- John McCullough
- Clint McDaniel
- Xavier McDaniel
- Jaden McDaniels
- Jalen McDaniels
- Jim McDaniels
- K. J. McDaniels
- Bobby McDermott
- Doug McDermott
- Sean McDermott
- Ben McDonald
- Bill McDonald
- Glenn McDonald
- Michael McDonald
- Roderick McDonald
- Hank McDowell
- Antonio McDyess
- Robert McElliott
- Jim McElroy
- Pat McFarland
- Ivan McFarlin
- Mel McGaha
- Mitch McGary
- JaVale McGee
- Mike McGee
- Bill McGill
- George McGinnis
- Jon McGlocklin
- Vince McGowan
- Bryce McGowens
- Tracy McGrady
- Gil McGregor
- Cameron McGriff
- Elton McGriff
- Rodney McGruder
- Al McGuire
- Allie McGuire
- Dick McGuire
- Dominic McGuire
- Kevin McHale
- Maurice McHartley
- Jim McIlvaine
- Jeff McInnis
- Kennedy McIntosh
- Bob McIntyre
- Jerry McKee
- Kevin McKenna
- Forrest McKenzie
- Stan McKenzie
- Derrick McKey
- Aaron McKie
- Billy McKinney
- Bones McKinney
- Carlton McKinney
- Trey McKinney-Jones
- Alfonzo McKinnie
- JaQuori McLaughlin
- Jordan McLaughlin
- Ben McLemore
- McCoy McLemore
- George McLeod
- Keith McLeod
- Roshown McLeod
- Curt McMahon
- Jack McMahon
- Mike McMichael
- Nate McMillan
- Tom McMillen
- Jim McMillian
- Shellie McMillon
- Mal McMullen
- Chet McNabb
- Mark McNamara
- Joe McNamee
- Jerel McNeal
- Chris McNealy
- Liam McNeeley
- Bob McNeill
- Larry McNeill
- Carl McNulty
- Paul McPherson
- Roy McPipe
- Cozell McQueen
- Jordan McRae
- Thales McReynolds
- Josh McRoberts
- Jack McVeigh
- Eric McWilliams
- Dean Mealy
- George Mearns
- Gene Mechling
- Slava Medvedenko
- Darnell Mee
- Chick Meehan
- Jodie Meeks
- Cliff Meely
- Scott Meents
- Bernie Mehen
- Dick Mehen
- Don Meineke
- Carl Meinhold
- Salah Mejri
- Gal Mekel
- Frank Mekules
- Bill Melchionni
- Gary Melchionni
- Nicolò Melli
- Fab Melo
- De'Anthony Melton
- Ed Melvin
- Dean Meminger
- Chuck Mencel
- Murray Mendenhall Jr.
- John Mengelt
- Mengke Bateer
- Ken Menke
- Nathan Mensah
- Pops Mensah-Bonsu
- DeWitt Menyard
- Ron Mercer
- Joe C. Meriweather
- Porter Meriwether
- Sam Merrill
- Tom Meschery
- Chimezie Metu
- Big Moose Meyer
- Bill Meyer
- Little Moose Meyer
- Loren Meyer
- Tom Meyer
- Dave Meyers
- Ward Meyers
- Stan Miasek
- Larry Micheaux
- Vasilije Micić
- Jordan Mickey
- Khris Middleton
- Ted Migdal
- Red Mihalik
- Chris Mihm
- Eric Mika
- Ed Mikan
- George Mikan
- Larry Mikan
- Vern Mikkelsen
- Al Miksis
- Aaron Miles
- C. J. Miles
- Darius Miles
- Eddie Miles
- Marko Milič
- Darko Miličić
- Nat Militzok
- Andre Miller
- Anthony Miller
- Baba Miller
- Bill Miller
- Bob Miller
- Brad Miller
- Brandon Miller
- Darius Miller
- Dick Miller
- Eddie Miller
- Emanuel Miller
- Harry Miller
- Jay Miller
- Jordan Miller
- Larry Miller
- Leonard Miller
- Malcolm Miller
- Mike Miller
- Oliver Miller
- Quincy Miller
- Reggie Miller
- Walt Miller
- Chris Mills
- Ed Mills
- Jack Mills
- John Mills
- Patty Mills
- Terry Mills
- Elijah Millsap
- Paul Millsap
- Shake Milton
- Justin Minaya
- Harold Miner
- Riley Minix
- Dirk Minniefield
- Dave Minor
- Greg Minor
- Mark Minor
- Josh Minott
- Nikola Mirotić
- Wat Misaka
- Jason Miskiri
- Yves Missi
- Ajay Mitchell
- Davion Mitchell
- Dillon Mitchell
- Donovan Mitchell
- Guy Mitchell
- Leland Mitchell
- Mike Mitchell
- Murray Mitchell
- Sam Mitchell
- Todd Mitchell
- Tony Mitchell (b. 1989)
- Tony Mitchell (b. 1992)
- Naz Mitrou-Long
- Steve Mix
- Bill Mlkvy
- Cuttino Mobley
- Eric Mobley
- Evan Mobley
- Isaiah Mobley
- Doug Moe
- Ed Moeller
- Larry Moffett
- Jonathan Mogbo
- Leo Mogus
- Nazr Mohammed
- John Moir
- John Moiseichik
- Jérôme Moïso
- Paul Mokeski
- Adam Mokoka
- Jack Molinas
- Wayne Molis
- Sidney Moncrief
- Chima Moneke
- Eric Money
- Sergei Monia
- Malik Monk
- Earl Monroe
- Greg Monroe
- Rodney Monroe
- Luis Montero
- Howie Montgomery
- Jim Montgomery
- Eric Montross
- Bud Moodler
- Moses Moody
- Jamario Moon
- Xavier Moon
- Jim Mooney
- Matt Mooney
- Andre Moore
- Ben Moore
- Dudey Moore
- E'Twaun Moore
- Gene Moore
- Jackie Moore
- Johnny Moore
- Larry Moore
- Lowes Moore
- Mikki Moore
- Otto Moore
- Richie Moore
- Ron Moore
- Tazé Moore
- Tracy Moore
- Wendell Moore Jr.
- Alex Morales
- Ja Morant
- Eric Moreland
- Jackie Moreland
- Dale Morey
- Guy Morgan
- Juwan Morgan
- Rex Morgan
- Elmore Morgenthaler
- Darren Morningstar
- Chris Morris
- Darius Morris
- Isaiah Morris
- Jaylen Morris
- Marcus Morris
- Markieff Morris
- Max Morris
- Monté Morris
- Randolph Morris
- Terence Morris
- Adam Morrison
- Emmett Morrison
- John Morrison
- Mike Morrison
- Red Morrison
- Anthony Morrow
- George Morse
- Ray Morstadt
- Dwayne Morton
- John Morton
- Richard Morton
- Al Moschetti
- Glenn Mosley
- Perry Moss
- Lawrence Moten
- Donatas Motiejūnas
- Johnathan Motley
- Hanno Möttölä
- Arnett Moultrie
- Pete Mount
- Rick Mount
- Alonzo Mourning
- Timofey Mozgov
- Chuck Mrazovich
- Emmanuel Mudiay
- Erwin Mueller
- Tex Mueller
- Shabazz Muhammad
- Mychal Mulder
- Joe Mullaney
- Ed Mullen
- Bob Mullens
- Byron Mullens
- Chris Mullin
- Jeff Mullins
- Bob Mulvihill
- Todd Mundt
- Xavier Munford
- Chris Munk
- George Munroe
- Eric Murdock
- Gheorghe Mureșan
- Ade Murkey
- Allen Murphy
- Calvin Murphy
- Dick Murphy
- Erik Murphy
- Jay Murphy
- Kevin Murphy
- Ronnie Murphy
- Tod Murphy
- Trey Murphy III
- Troy Murphy
- Dejounte Murray
- Jamal Murray
- Keegan Murray
- Ken Murray
- Kris Murray
- Lamond Murray
- Ronald Murray
- Tracy Murray
- Collin Murray-Boyles
- Willie Murrell
- Dorie Murrey
- Toure' Murry
- Džanan Musa
- Mike Muscala
- Angelo Musi
- Jerrod Mustaf
- Dikembe Mutombo
- Martin Müürsepp
- Pete Myers
- Sviatoslav Mykhailiuk
