= John McAdams =

John McAdams may refer to:

- John McAdams (announcer) (1941–2005), sports announcer
- John C. McAdams (1945–2021), associate professor of political science at Marquette University
- Johnny McAdams (1912–1975), American basketball player

== See also ==
- John McAdam (disambiguation)
