= McAdams =

McAdams or MacAdams is a surname of Scottish origin. It may refer to:

- Ben McAdams (born 1974), Utah state senator (2009–2013), Mayor of Salt Lake County, Utah (2013–2019), U.S. Representative (2019-2021)
- Billy McAdams (1939–2002), Northern-Irish footballer
- Carl McAdams (born 1944), American professional football player
- Cynthia MacAdams (born 1939), American actress and photographer
- Dan P. McAdams (born 1954), American professor of psychology
- Dean McAdams (1917–1996), American football player
- Dona Ann McAdams (born 1954), American photographer
- Francis H. McAdams (1915–1985), American member of the National Transportation Safety Board (NTSB)
- Janet McAdams (born 1957), American author of partial Native American descent
- John McAdams (announcer) (1941–2005), American sports announcer
- John C. McAdams (1945–2021), American political scientist
- Lewis MacAdams (1943–2020), American poet, journalist, activist, and filmmaker
- Rachel McAdams (born 1978), Canadian actress
- Roberta MacAdams (1880–1959), Canadian politician from Alberta
- Scott McAdams (born 1970), Mayor of Sitka, Alaska and Democratic nominee for United States Senator from Alaska in 2010

Places

- McAdams, Wichita, Kansas, a neighborhood
- McAdams, Mississippi, an unincorporated community in Attala County
- McAdams, Pennsylvania, an unincorporated community in Washington County
- McAdams Lake, Nova Scotia, a community in Canada
