= Tamagno =

Tamagno is an Italian surname. It may refer to:

- Chelso Tamagno (1912–1986), American basketball player
- Francesco Tamagno (1850–1905), Italian opera tenor
- Giovanni Tamagno (born c. 1923), Italian rugby union and professional rugby league footballer who played in the 1940s and 1950s
- Mario Tamagno (1877–1941), Italian architect
