= John McAdam =

John McAdam may refer to:

- John Loudon McAdam (1756–1836), Scottish engineer noted for inventing the process of "macadamization" of roads
- John McAdam (politician) (1807–1893), Irish-born politician in New Brunswick, Canada
- John Macadam (1827–1865), Australian (Scottish-born) chemist, medical teacher and politician, after whom the Macadamia nut is named
- John McAdam (businessman) (born circa 1950), American businessman

== See also ==
- John McAdams (disambiguation)
