= Robert Cope =

Robert Cope may refer to:

- Robert Cope (died 1753), Irish Member of Parliament
- Robert Camden Cope (died 1818), Member of Parliament for Armagh
- Robert Cope (basketball) (Robert Kridler Cope, 1911–1995), American basketball player
- Bob Cope (basketball) (Robert D. Cope, 1928–2011), American basketball player and coach
- Jack Cope (Robert Knox Cope, 1913–1991), South African writer

== See also ==
- Bob Cope (1936–1997), American football coach
