= Neil O'Donnell (disambiguation) =

Neil O'Donnell (born 1966) is an American former football player.

Neil O'Donnell may also refer to:

- Neil O'Donnell (Scottish footballer) (1949–2022), Scottish footballer
- Neil O'Donnell (basketball) (1914–1996), American basketball player

== See also ==
- Niall O'Donnell (born 1998), Irish Gaelic footballer
- Niall Ó Dónaill (1908–1995), Irish lexicographer
