= McAdam (surname) =

McAdam, MacAdam or Macadam (Irish: Mac Adaim) is a Scottish Gaelic clan which originated as a branch of Clan Gregor. As a surname it is most prominent in the Galloway and Ayrshire regions of Scotland. Some of their descendants are also to be found in Ireland, the United States, Australia and Canada.

Notable people with the surname include:

== Sports ==
- Adrian McAdam (born 1971), Australian Rules footballer
- Al McAdam (born 1952), Canadian Ice Hockey player and coach
- Colin McAdam (1951–2013), a Scottish footballer most notable for playing for Rangers
- Gilbert McAdam (born 1967), Australian Rules footballer
- Greg McAdam (born 1961), Australian Rules footballer
- Keith McAdam (born 1945), Scottish cricketer and specialist in tropical diseases
- Tom McAdam, (born 1954) Scottish footballer most notable for playing for Celtic

== Academics and technology ==
- David MacAdam (1910–1998), American color scientist
- Doug McAdam (born 1951), American sociologist studying social movements
- John Loudon McAdam (1756–1836), Scottish engineer noted for inventing the process of "macadamization" of roads
- John Macadam (1827–1865), Australian (Scottish-born) chemist, medical teacher and politician, after whom the Macadamia nut is named

== Art, architecture and literature ==
- Colin McAdam (born 1971), Canadian novelist
- Margaret Macadam (1902–1991), British illustrator active during the 1920s and 1930s
- Patrick "Pat" MacAdam (1934–2015), Canadian writer
- Sean McAdam, American baseball writer
- T. A. McAdam (fl. 1940s), professional partner of Herbert Jory in Jory and McAdam, architectural practice in Adelaide, South Australia
- Trish McAdam (born 1955), Irish screen director

== Other ==
- Elliot McAdam (1951–2024), Australian politician and Northern Territory Cabinet member
- John McAdam (1807–1893), Irish-born politician in New Brunswick, Canada
- Ivison Macadam (1894–1974), founding President of National Union of Students (United Kingdom)
- John McAdam, (born 1948), American-English businessman
- Leo McAdam (1929–2024), Canadian politician
