= Ochsenhirt =

Ochsenhirt is a surname. Notable people with the surname include:

- Mary Ochsenhirt Amdur (1921–1998), American toxicologist and public health researcher
- Russ Ochsenhirt (1912–2002), American basketball player
