= Wilson Fitts =

American basketball player

Personal information
- Born: June 16, 1915 Smithville, Tennessee, U.S.
- Died: February 23, 2005 (aged 89) Topeka, Kansas, U.S.
- Listed height: 6 ft 2 in (1.88 m)
- Listed weight: 165 lb (75 kg)

Career information
- High school: East (Akron, Ohio)
- College: Akron (1933–1937)
- Position: Guard / forward

Career history
- 1937–1939: Akron Goodyear Wingfoots

Career highlights
- NBL champion (1938)

William Wilson Fitts (June 16, 1915 – February 23, 2005) was an American professional basketball player. He played for the Akron Goodyear Wingfoots in the National Basketball League from 1937 to 1939. In his brief professional career, Cope averaged 2.0 points per game and contributed towards the Wingfoots' league championship in the 1937–38 season.

== Career statistics ==
=== NBL ===
Legend
| GP | Games played | FGM | Field goals made |
| FTM | Free throws made | FTA | Free throws attempted |
| FT% | Free throw percentage | PTS | Total points |
| PPG | Points per game | **Bold** | Career high |

| † | Denotes seasons in which Fitts's team won an NBL championship |

==== Regular season ====
| Year | Team | GP | FGM | FTM | PTS | PPG |
|---|---|---|---|---|---|---|
| 1937–38† | Akron G.W. | 12 | 8 | 6 | 22 | 1.8 |
| 1938–39† | Akron G.W. | **19** | **16** | **7** | **39** | **2.1** |
| Career | | 31 | 24 | 13 | 61 | 2.0 |

==== Playoffs ====
| Year | Team | GP | FGM | FTM | PTS | PPG |
|---|---|---|---|---|---|---|
| 1938† | Akron G.W. | 5 | 2 | 6 | 10 | 2.0 |
