= Bob Johnson (basketball, born 1917) =

American basketball player

Personal information
- Born: January 29, 1917 Bellevue, Pennsylvania
- Died: October 7, 2000 (aged 83) Fort Myers, Florida
- Listed height: 6 ft 2 in (1.88 m)
- Listed weight: 170 lb (77 kg)

Career information
- High school: Bellevue (Bellevue, Pennsylvania)
- College: Pittsburgh (1935–1938)
- Position: Guard

Career history
- 1938: Akron Goodyear Wingfoots
- 1939–1940: Corbet Republicans

Robert Arthur Johnson (January 29, 1917 – October 7, 2000) was an American professional basketball player. He played in the National Basketball League for the Akron Goodyear Wingfoots in four games during the 1938–39 season.
