= Leroy Lins =

American basketball player

Personal information
- Born: June 21, 1913 Milltown, New Jersey
- Died: August 12, 1986 (aged 73) Atlantis, Florida
- Listed height: 6 ft 1 in (1.85 m)
- Listed weight: 175 lb (79 kg)

Career information
- High school: New Brunswick (New Brunswick, New Jersey); Rutgers Preparatory School (Somerset, New Jersey)
- College: Rutgers (1934–1937)
- Position: Guard

Career history
- 1937–1938: Akron Goodyear Wingfoots

Leroy John Lins (June 21, 1913 – August 12, 1986) was an American professional basketball player. He played for the Akron Goodyear Wingfoots in the National Basketball League for eight games during the 1937–38 season and averaged 0.5 points per game. After basketball, Lins worked for Goodyear for many years.
