= Buck Lamme =

American athlete and basketball coach (1905–1957)

Personal information
- Born: July 2, 1905 Delaware, Ohio, U.S.
- Died: September 4, 1957 (aged 52) Dublin, Ohio, U.S.
- Listed height: 6 ft 2 in (1.88 m)
- Listed weight: 180 lb (82 kg)

Career information
- High school: Ostrander (Ostrander, Ohio)
- College: Ohio Wesleyan (1923–1926)
- Playing career: 1928–1947
- Position: Guard
- Coaching career: 1926–1929

Career history

Playing
- 1928–1929: Newsies (OH)
- 1928–1929: Columbus
- 1928–1929: Coshocton Independents
- 1929–1930: Canton Orphans
- 1931–1933: Cleveland Penzoils
- 1933–1934: Coshocton Independents
- 1934–1935: Coshocton Buckeyes
- 1935–1936: Dayton Metropolitans
- 1936–1937: Richmar Sterling Oils
- 1937: Columbus Athletic Supply
- 1946–1947: Shea's Insurance

Coaching
- 1926–1927: West HS
- 1927–1928: Uhrichsville HS
- 1928–1929: West HS

Career highlights
- Second-team all-Buckeye (1926)

Emerald Ford "Buck" Lamme (July 2, 1905 – September 4, 1957) was an American three-sport athlete: professional basketball and football, and minor league baseball. He played collegiately at Ohio Wesleyan University, and Lamme also later spent several years coaching high school basketball.

== Professional careers ==
=== Football ===
Lamme's professional football career was just one game in the National Football League. He played for the Cleveland Indians in 1931, the only season the franchise existed. Lamme played the end position.

=== Basketball ===
Lamme's basketball career spanned independent leagues, the National Professional Basketball League, Midwest Basketball Conference, and the National Basketball League (NBL) from the late 1920s to the mid-1940s. A guard, he appeared in only one NBL game, for Columbus Athletic Supply, but did not register a field goal.

=== Baseball ===
Preceding both his professional football and basketball careers with a stint playing minor league baseball. He competed for the Akron Tyrites in 1928. In 28 games as a first baseman he registered a .244 batting average in 90 at-bats.

== Death ==
In 1957, Lamme was found dead at the foot of the O'Shaughnessy Dam in Dublin, Ohio. He had jumped to his death and it was reported as suicide. He was the owner of the Brown Jug Restaurant in Delaware, Ohio, at the time of his death.

== Career statistics ==
Legend
GP	Games played	FGM	Field goals made
FTM	Free throws made	FTA	Free throws attempted
FT%	Free throw percentage	PTS	Total points
PPG	Points per game	**Bold**	Career high

=== NBL ===
==== Regular season ====
Year	Team	GP	FGM	FTM	PTS	PPG
1937–38	Columbus	1	0	0	0	.0
