= South High School (Columbus, Ohio) =

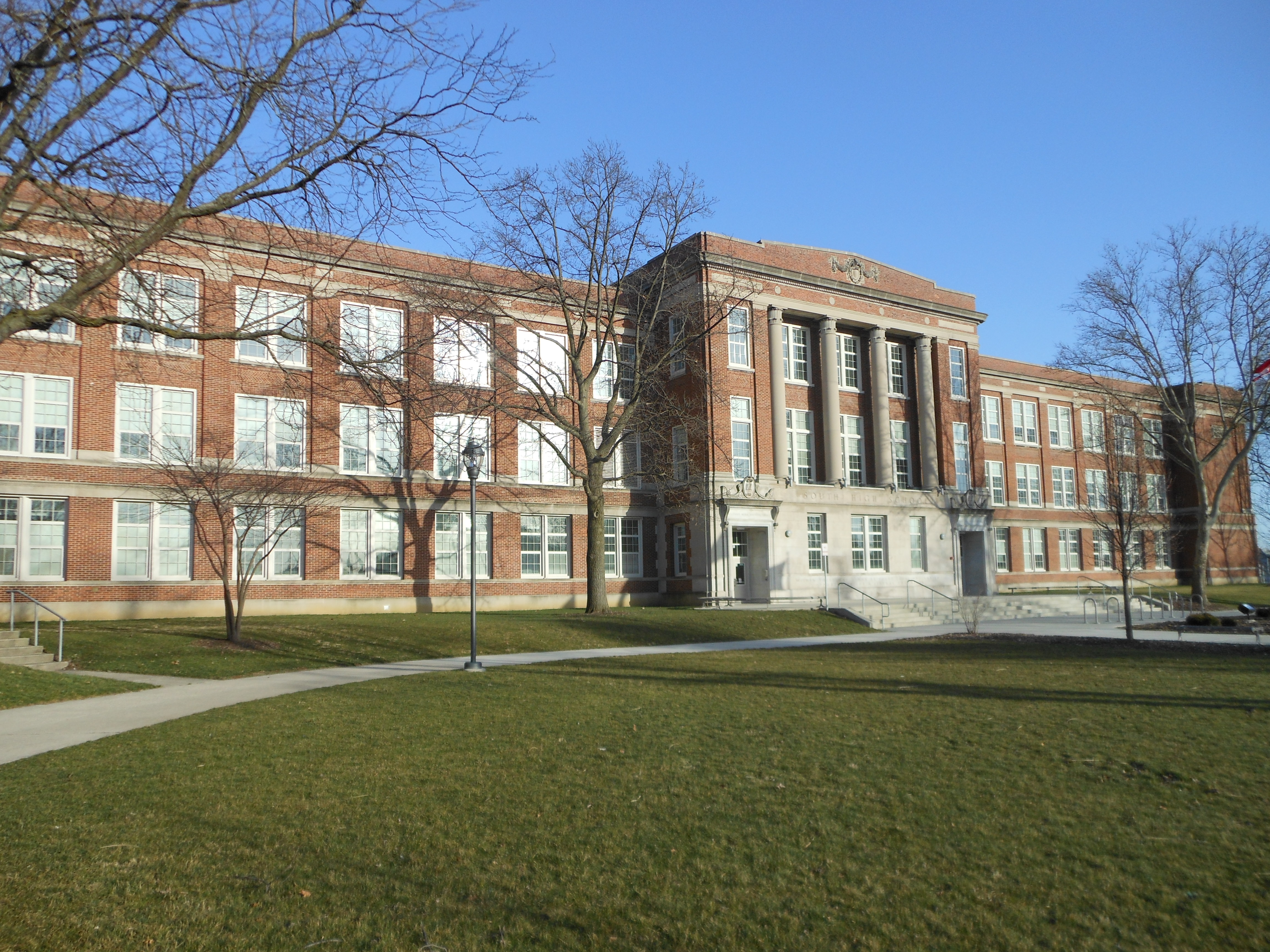

Location
- 1160 Ann Street; Columbus, (Franklin County), Ohio 43206; United States
- Coordinates: 39°56′25″N 82°58′48″W

Information
- Type: Public, Coeducational high school
- Established: 1897
- School district: Columbus City Schools
- Superintendent: Angela Chapman
- Principal: Christy Nickerson
- Teaching staff: 56.00 (FTE)
- Grades: 7-12
- Enrollment: 902 (2023–2024)
- Student to teacher ratio: 16.11
- Colors: Blue and Gray
- Athletics conference: Columbus City League
- Nickname: Dawgs
- Team name: Bulldogs
- Rival: Columbus Marion Franklin High School
- Accreditation: North Central Association of Colleges and Schools
- Newspaper: The Optic
- Yearbook: The Lens
- Website: https://southhs.ccsoh.us/

South High School is a public high school located on the south side of Columbus, Ohio. It was opened in 1900 as the fourth Columbus City Schools high school at 345 Deshler Avenue. The current building was opened March 31, 1924. The Charles S. Barrett Building at 345 E. Deshler Ave (named for that building's first principal in 1924 when it was reutilized as a junior high school) opened September 1900. Prior to that in 1895-1897 South High School utilized part of the Ohio Avenue Elementary School. In 1897 it was decided that the building was too far east for its name; the south side students were returned to the Central High School building at 6th & Broad Streets, and the building process began on the Deshler Street Building. It was known as South Urban Academy for a short time. The school is located at 1160 Ann Street.

The mascot for South High School is the Bulldog.

The school was remodeled in 2009 and classes were being held in the Barrett Building, the original South High School. The remodel was complete and classes resumed at the current Ann Street building in the summer of 2010.

== Ohio High School Athletic Association State Championships ==
- Baseball (1932)
- Boys Basketball (1965)
- Boys Track & Field 4 × 400 m Relay (1992)
- Diving (1927)
- Football (1916)
- Girls Basketball (1986)
- Girls Track & Field 220m (1978)
- Girls Track & Field 440m (1978)
- Girls Track & Field 400m (1981)

== Ohio High School Athletic Association Regional Championships ==
- Baseball (1932, 1944)
- Boys Basketball (1954, 1965, 1986, 2019)
- Boys Track & Field (1994)
- Boys Track & Field 100m (1994)
- Boys Track & Field 200m (1994)
- Boys Track & Field 400m (1994)
- Boys Track & Field 4 × 400 m Relay (1994)
- Boys Track & Field High Jump (1994)
- Girls Basketball (1986)

== Ohio High School Athletic Association District Championships ==
- Baseball (1930, 1931, 1932, 1934, 1944)
- Boys Basketball (1927, 1942, 1954, 1956, 1965, 1973, 1980, 1986, 2015, 2018, 2019)
- Boys Track & Field (1954, 1983, 1990, 1992, 1993, 1994)
- Boys Track & Field High Jump (1979)
- Boys Track & Field 100m (1994)
- Boys Track & Field 200m (1994)
- Boys Track & Field 400m (1994)
- Boys Track & Field 4 × 100 m Relay (1991,1992)
- Boys Track & Field 4 × 400 m Relay (1991,1992)
- Boys Track & Field Shot Put (1994)
- Wrestling (Individual) 112lbs (1985)
- Girls Basketball (1983, 1985, 1986, 1992, 1993)
- Girls Track & Field (1980)

== Notable alumni ==
- Greg Bell, former NFL player.
- Elbert Dubenion, former NFL Player.
- Frank Howard, former MLB player.
- Curtis LeMay, United States Air Force general and one-time candidate for Vice President of the United States.
- Tom Moody, 49th mayor of Columbus, Ohio.
- Gene Scholz, Professional Basketball Player, class of 1935.

== See also ==
- Schools in Columbus, Ohio
