= Lefty Byers =

American basketball coach (1905–2000)

Personal information
- Born: September 6, 1905 Nebraska, U.S.
- Died: May 25, 2000 (aged 94) Ohio, U.S.

Career information
- College: Kansas State (1924–1927)

Career history

Playing
- 1930–1932: Akron Firestone Non-Skids

Coaching
- 1936–1939: Akron Goodyear Wingfoots

Career highlights
- As player: 2× First-team All-MVC (1926, 1927); As coach: NBL champion (1938); NBL Coach of the Year (1938); MBC champion (1937)

Clifton Andrew "Lefty" Byers (September 6, 1905 – May 25, 2000) was an American professional basketball coach for the Akron Goodyear Wingfoots in the United States' National Basketball League (NBL). He was the NBL Coach of the Year in 1937–38. During Byers' tenure, the Wingfoots transitioned from the Midwest Basketball Conference (MBC) in 1936–37 into the NBL in 1937–38 (its inaugural season). Byers led the Wingfoots to win the first-ever NBL championship in 1938. The year before, the team had also won the MBC championship.

As a player, Byers competed in basketball, track, and baseball for Kansas State University in the 1920s. In basketball, he was named to the All-Missouri Valley Conference first-team twice, as both a junior (1926) and as a senior (1927). He then played semi-professionally for the Akron Firestone Non-Skids in 1930–31 and 1931–32 while they were an amateur industrial league team.

== Head coaching record ==
The below season records reflect Byers' tenure as head coach when the Akron Goodyear Wingfoots were in the NBL. In 1936–37 they were still members of the MBC and that season is not counted toward official NBL coaching records.

Legend
Regular season	G	Games coached	W	Games won	L	Games lost	W–L %	Win–loss %
Playoffs	PG	Playoff games	PW	Playoff wins	PL	Playoff losses	PW–L %	Playoff win–loss %

Team	Year	G	W	L	W–L%	Finish	PG	PW	PL	PW–L%	Result
Akron	1937–38	18	13	5	.722	2nd in Eastern	5	4	1	.800	Won NBL Championship
Akron	1938–39	28	14	14	.500	2nd in Eastern	—	—	—	—	Missed Playoffs
Total		46	27	19	.587		5	4	1	.800	
