= Floyd Ebaugh =

American basketball player (1914–1980)

Personal information
- Born: May 30, 1914 Superior, Nebraska
- Died: June 10, 1980 (aged 66) El Segundo, California
- Listed height: 6 ft 7 in (2.01 m)
- Listed weight: 230 lb (104 kg)

Career information
- High school: Superior (Superior, Nebraska)
- College: Nebraska (1935–1938)
- Position: Center

Career history
- 1938–1940 1941–1942: Akron Goodyear Wingfoots
- 1941–1942: Toledo White Huts
- 1941–1942: Lincoln Woodmen Accidents
- 1942–1943: Akron Collegians
- 1943–1944: Dayton Collegians
- 1943–1944: Dayton Bombers

Floyd Harold Ebaugh (May 30, 1914 – June 10, 1980) was an American professional basketball player. He played for the Akron Goodyear Wingfoots (AGW) in the National Basketball League for three seasons, from 1938 to 1942, including in the playoffs for the 1941–42 season.

Ebaugh averaged 4.2 points over the course of his 73-game career with AGW. Following his NBL career, Ebaugh played for the independent teams the Toledo White Huts, Lincoln Woodman Accidents, Akron Collegians, Dayton Collegians and Dayton Bombers.

Ebaugh was born and grew up in Superior, Nebraska. He attended Superior High School and graduated in 1932. Alongside playing basketball at high school, he was also on the track team, competing in the 880 yard relay, high jump, shot put and discus.

From 1934 to 1938 Ebaugh attended Nebraska University and played on the college's basketball team. He was basketball team captain in his senior year.
