= Mike McMichael =

American basketball player

Personal information
- Born: July 4, 1915 Des Moines, Iowa
- Died: November 13, 1997 (aged 82) Harlingen, Texas
- Listed height: 6 ft 2 in (1.88 m)
- Listed weight: 195 lb (88 kg)

Career information
- High school: Roosevelt (Des Moines, Iowa)
- College: Northwestern (1934–1938)
- Position: Guard

Career history
- 1938–1939: Akron Goodyear Wingfoots

Marcellus Martin "Mike" McMichael (July 4, 1915 – November 13, 1997) was an American professional basketball player. He played for the Akron Goodyear Wingfoots in the National Basketball League during the 1938–39 season and averaged 3.9 points per game.
