= Jim O'Donnell (basketball) =

American basketball player

Personal information
- Born: December 3, 1912 New York City, New York, U.S.
- Died: December 26, 1984 (aged 72) Buffalo, New York, U.S.
- Listed height: 6 ft 1 in (1.85 m)
- Listed weight: 180 lb (82 kg)

Career information
- College: Canisius (1934–1937)
- Position: Power forward / center

Career history
- 1937–1938: Buffalo Bisons

James O'Donnell (December 3, 1912 – December 26, 1984) was an American professional basketball player. He played for the Buffalo Bisons in the National Basketball League for eight games during the 1937–38 season and averaged 1.3 points per game.

Jim was the older brother of Neil O'Donnell, who also played on the Bisons in 1937–38.

== Career statistics ==
Legend
GP	Games played	FGM	Field goals made
FTM	Free throws made	FTA	Free throws attempted
FT%	Free throw percentage	PTS	Total points
PPG	Points per game	**Bold**	Career high

=== NBL ===
==== Regular season ====
Year	Team	GP	FGM	FTM	PTS	PPG
1937–38	Buffalo	8	3	4	10	1.3
