= Edwin Healy =

Australian cricketer

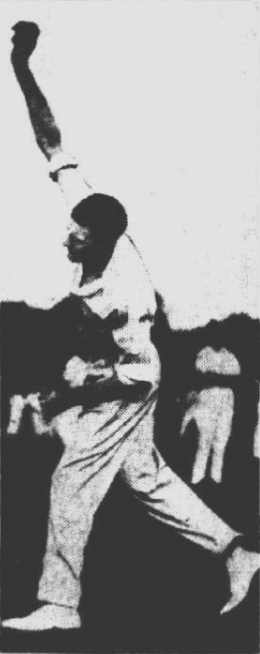

Personal information
- Born: 26 September 1909; Melbourne, Australia
- Died: 14 June 1995 (aged 85); Melbourne, Australia

Domestic team information
- Years: Team
- 1931-1932: Victoria
- Source: Cricinfo, 22 November 2015

Edwin Healy (26 September 1909 – 14 June 1995) was an Australian cricketer. He played five first-class cricket matches for Victoria between 1931 and 1932.

== See also ==
- List of Victoria first-class cricketers
