= Stan Raiman =

American basketball player (1914–1997)

Personal information
- Born: March 22, 1914 Lackawanna, New York, U.S.
- Died: January 30, 1997 (aged 82) Lackawanna, New York, U.S.
- Listed height: 5 ft 9 in (1.75 m)
- Listed weight: 140 lb (64 kg)

Career information
- College: Canisius (1934–1937)
- Position: Shooting guard / small forward

Career history
- 1936–1938: Buffalo Bisons

Stanley Leonard Raiman (March 22, 1914 – January 30, 1997) was an American professional basketball player. He played for the Buffalo Bisons in the National Basketball League and averaged 2.4 points per game. He later coached high school basketball.

== Career statistics ==
Legend
| GP | Games played | FGM | Field goals made |
| FTM | Free throws made | FTA | Free throws attempted |
| FT% | Free throw percentage | PTS | Total points |
| PPG | Points per game | **Bold** | Career high |

=== NBL ===
==== Regular season ====
| Year | Team | GP | FGM | FTM | PTS | PPG |
|---|---|---|---|---|---|---|
| 1937–38 | Buffalo | 9 | 10 | 2 | 22 | 2.4 |
