= Denny Elliot =

American basketball player (1914–1998)

Personal information
- Born: February 18, 1914 Bellefontaine, Ohio
- Died: December 25, 1998 (aged 84) Gaithersburg, Maryland
- Listed height: 5 ft 9 in (1.75 m)
- Listed weight: 150 lb (68 kg)

Career information
- High school: Canal Winchester (Canal Winchester, Ohio)
- College: Otterbein (1933–1936)
- Position: Guard

Career history

Playing
- 1936–1938: Columbus Athletic Supply

Coaching
- 1937–1940: Ostrander HS
- 1940–1942: Westerville HS

Denton Webber Elliot (February 18, 1914 – December 25, 1998) was an American professional basketball player. He played in the National Basketball League for the Columbus Athletic Supply in nine games and averaged 2.8 points per game. He coached high school basketball after his playing days.
