= Gene Scholz =

American basketball player

- Born: 28 September 1917; Columbus, Ohio, U.S.
- Died: 5 March 2005 (aged 87); Reynoldsburg, Ohio, U.S.
- Occupation: Basketball Player
- Organizations: Columbus Athletic Supply; Dayton Acme Aviators; Columbus Mariners

Eugene Milton Scholz (September 28, 1917 – March 9, 2005) was a professional basketball player. Scholz was born in Columbus, Ohio, and attended South High School. He attended Marietta College in Marietta, Ohio, leaving before graduation to care for his family after the death of his father, Clarence. His playing career consisted of stints with the Columbus Athletic Supply (National Basketball League), the Dayton Acme Aviators (Independent), and the Columbus Mariners (All-American Professional Basketball League), where he served as player-coach. In 1945, Scholz and the Aviators reached the finals of the World Professional Basketball Tournament in Chicago, losing 52–78 to the Ft. Wayne Pistons.
