= Little Moose Meyer =

American basketball player

Personal information
- Born: June 17, 1917 Peotone, Illinois, U.S.
- Died: July 1, 1962 (aged 45) Peotone, Illinois, U.S.
- Listed height: 6 ft 0 in (1.83 m)
- Position: Guard

Career history
- 1937–1938: Kankakee Gallagher Trojans

LaVerne Lester "Little Moose" Meyer (June 17, 1917 – July 1, 1962) was an American professional basketball player. He played for the Kankakee Gallagher Trojans in the National Basketball League for three games during the 1938–39 season and averaged 2.3 points per game.

He is not related to teammate Big Moose Meyer, who happened to play alongside him with the Trojans. A heart attack killed Meyer at age 45.

== Career statistics ==
Legend
| GP | Games played | FGM | Field goals made |
| FTM | Free throws made | FTA | Free throws attempted |
| FT% | Free throw percentage | PTS | Total points |
| PPG | Points per game | **Bold** | Career high |

=== NBL ===
==== Regular season ====
| Year | Team | GP | FGM | FTM | PTS | PPG |
|---|---|---|---|---|---|---|
| 1937–38 | Kankakee | 3 | 3 | 1 | 7 | 2.3 |
