= Clyde Anton =

American basketball player

- Position: Guard

Career history
- 1937–1938: Columbus Athletic Supply

Clyde Anton was an American professional basketball player. He played for the Columbus Athletic Supply in the National Basketball League and averaged 1.4 points per game during 1937–38.
