= John Charles (footballer, born 1935) =

Australian rules footballer

Personal information
- Full name: John Charles
- Born: 29 September 1935
- Died: 21 June 1995 (aged 59)
- Original team: Westgarth Stars
- Height: 187 cm (6 ft 2 in)
- Weight: 86 kg (190 lb)

Playing career^{1}
Years	Club	Games (Goals)
1955	Fitzroy	2 (0)
- ^{1} Playing statistics correct to the end of 1955.

John Charles (29 September 1935 – 21 June 1995) was a former Australian rules footballer who played with Fitzroy in the Victorian Football League (VFL).
