= Dean Mealy =

American basketball player (1915–1973)

Personal information
- Born: May 7, 1915 Cuyahoga Falls, Ohio, U.S.
- Died: April 28, 1973 (aged 57) Massillon, Ohio, U.S.
- Listed height: 6 ft 4 in (1.93 m)
- Listed weight: 195 lb (88 kg)

Career information
- High school: Cuyahoga Falls (Cuyahoga Falls, Ohio)
- College: Muskingum (1934–1938)
- Position: Center

Career history
- 1937–1939: Akron Goodyear Wingfoots
- 1939–1940: Oshkosh All-Stars

Career highlights
- NBL champion (1938)

Dean R. Mealy (May 7, 1915 – April 28, 1973) was an American professional basketball player. He played for the Akron Goodyear Wingfoots and Oshkosh All-Stars in the National Basketball League (NBL) between 1937 and 1940. For his career he averaged 3.8 points per game and helped lead the Wingfoots to the NBL championship in 1937–38.

While at Muskingum University, Mealy played for the football, basketball, and track teams.

== Career statistics ==
Legend
GP	Games played	FGM	Field goals made
FTM	Free throws made	FTA	Free throws attempted
FT%	Free throw percentage	PTS	Total points
PPG	Points per game	**Bold**	Career high

†	Denotes seasons in which Tamango's team won an NBL championship

=== NBL ===
==== Regular season ====
Year	Team	GP	FGM	FTM	PTS	PPG
1937–38†	Akron	8	6	**16**	28	3.5
1938–39	Akron	**10**	**15**	14	**44**	**4.4**
1939–40	Oshkosh	1	0	0	0	.0
Career		19	21	30	72	3.8

==== Playoffs ====
Year	Team	GP	FGM	FTM	PTS	PPG
1937–38†	Akron	3	2	5	9	3.0
