= Sam Loucks =

American basketball player (1915–1992)

Personal information
- Born: July 9, 1915 Fairfield, Ohio
- Died: August 4, 1992 (aged 77) Dayton, Ohio
- Listed height: 6 ft 4 in (1.93 m)
- Listed weight: 195 lb (88 kg)

Career information
- High school: Canal Winchester (Canal Winchester, Ohio)
- College: Otterbein (1934–1937)
- Playing career: 1937–1947
- Position: Forward / center

Career history
- 1937–1938: Columbus Athletic Supply
- 1938–1942: Dayton Delco Brake
- 1946–1947: Dayton Moraine Products

George Lisle "Sam" Loucks (July 9, 1915 – August 4, 1992) was an American professional basketball player. He played for the Columbus Athletic Supply in the National Basketball League for nine games during their 1937–38 season and averaged 4.1 points per game. Lillge also played in the Amateur Athletic Union for various teams. He also was in military service between 1942 and 1945 for the United States Air Corps, after which he went back to play In the AAU.
