= Robert Cope (basketball) =

American basketball player

Personal information
- Born: September 3, 1911 Columbiana, Ohio, U.S.
- Died: June 16, 1995 (aged 83) Manahawkin, New Jersey, U.S.
- Listed height: 6 ft 4 in (1.93 m)
- Listed weight: 190 lb (86 kg)

Career information
- High school: Salem (Salem, Ohio)
- College: Mount Union (1929–1933)
- Playing career: 1933–1938
- Position: Power forward / center

Career history
- 1933–1938: Akron Goodyear Wingfoots

Career highlights
- MBC champion (1937); NBL champion (1938)

Robert Kridler Cope (September 3, 1911 – June 16, 1995) was an American professional basketball player. He played for the Akron Goodyear Wingfoots in the National Basketball League during the 1937–38 season. In his brief professional career, Cope averaged 4.7 points per game and contributed towards the Wingfoots' league championship.

== Career statistics ==
Legend
GP	Games played	FGM	Field goals made
FTM	Free throws made	FTA	Free throws attempted
FT%	Free throw percentage	PTS	Total points
PPG	Points per game	**Bold**	Career high

†	Denotes seasons in which Cable's team won an NBL championship

=== NBL ===
==== Regular season ====
Year	Team	GP	FGM	FTM	PTS	PPG
1937–38†	Akron G.W.	15	26	19	71	4.7

==== Playoffs ====
Year	Team	GP	FGM	FTM	PTS	PPG
1938†	Akron G.W.	5	7	4	18	3.6
