= Chelso Tamagno =

American basketball player (1912–1986)

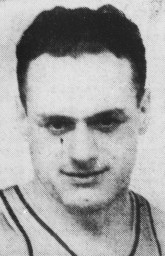
- Tamagno, circa 1938

Personal information
- Born: March 20, 1912 Chicago, Illinois, U.S.
- Died: April 1986 (age 74) Payson, Arizona, U.S.
- Listed height: 5 ft 10 in (1.78 m)
- Listed weight: 185 lb (84 kg)

Career information
- College: Michigan (1933–1936)
- Position: Guard / forward

Career history
- 1937–1939: Akron Goodyear Wingfoots

Career highlights
- MBC champion (1937); NBL champion (1938)

Chelso Peter Tamagno (March 20, 1912 – April 1986) was an American professional basketball player. He played college basketball for the University of Michigan and in the National Basketball League for the Akron Goodyear Wingfoots.

== Early years ==
Tamagno was born in 1912 in Illinois. His father, Ferdiand Tamagno, immigrated to the United States from Italy in 1900. His mother, Eda, immigrated to the United States from France in 1889. At the time of the 1920 and 1930 United States Censuses, the family was living in Chicago, and Tamagno's father was employed as an electrician at a utility company's power house. Tamagno also had two older sisters, Elthea and Julia.

== University of Michigan ==
Tamagno enrolled at the University of Michigan. While attending Michigan, he was a member of the Michigan Wolverines men's basketball team, playing principally at the guard position. As a sophomore, appeared in 19 of 20 games and scored 35 points for the 1933–34 team. As a junior, he appeared in 17 of 20 games and scored 49 points for the 1934–35 team that compiled a 2–10 record against Big Ten Conference opponents. In March 1935, Tamagno was voted by his teammates as the captain of the 1935–36 team.

As the senior captain of the 1935–36 team, Tamagno led the team dramatically improved 15–5 record (7–5 in conference) and a third-place finish in the Big Ten. Tamagno appeared in 18 of 20 games and scored 87 points for an average of 4.8 points per game.

Tamagno was also a member of the Michigamua honor society while attending the University of Michigan. He received a Bachelor of Science degree in education in 1936.

== Professional basketball ==
After graduating from Michigan, Tamagno played professional basketball for the Akron Goodyear Wingfoots of the National Basketball League (NBL) from 1937 to 1939. As a rookie, he appeared in 17 games and scored 38 points for the 1937–38 Wingfoots, a team that defeated the Oshkosh All-Stars to win the first NBL championship. The following year, he appeared in 11 games and scored 15 points.

== Family and later years ==
Tamagno was married in 1939 to Madelyn Kirby at Hancock, West Virginia. Tamagno remained in Akron for some time after retiring as a basketball player. In 1943, he was living with his wife Madelyn in Akron where he was employed as a supervisor with Goodyear Tire and Rubber Company.

After World War II, Tamagno moved to Arizona. In 1947, he was living with his wife Madelyn in Phoenix and was employed as a salesman. In 1951, Tamagno and his wife were still living in Phoenix. He was employed as a salesman for Arizona Distributing. In 1957, he was still living in Phoenix with wife Madelyn; he was employed at the time by Creighton Liquors.

Tamagno died in April 1986. He was a resident of Payson, Arizona.

== Career statistics ==
Legend
| GP | Games played | FGM | Field goals made |
| FTM | Free throws made | FTA | Free throws attempted |
| FT% | Free throw percentage | PTS | Total points |
| PPG | Points per game | **Bold** | Career high |

| † | Denotes seasons in which Tamango's team won an NBL championship |

=== NBL ===
==== Regular season ====
| Year | Team | GP | FGM | FTM | PTS | PPG |
|---|---|---|---|---|---|---|
| 1937–38† | Akron | **17** | **17** | **4** | **38** | **2.2** |
| 1938–39 | Akron | 11 | 6 | 3 | 15 | 1.4 |
| Career | | 28 | 23 | 7 | 53 | 1.9 |

==== Playoffs ====
| Year | Team | GP | FGM | FTM | PTS | PPG |
|---|---|---|---|---|---|---|
| 1938† | Akron | 5 | 2 | 1 | 5 | 1.0 |
