= Big Moose Meyer =

American basketball player

Personal information
- Born: April 22, 1910 Bonfield, Illinois, U.S.
- Died: November 10, 2000 (aged 90) Kankakee, Illinois, U.S.
- Listed height: 6 ft 7 in (2.01 m)
- Position: Power forward / center

Career history
- 1937–1938: Kankakee Gallagher Trojans

Donald Eugene "Big Moose" Meyer (April 22, 1910 – November 10, 2000) was an American professional basketball player. He played for the Kankakee Gallagher Trojans in the National Basketball League for nine games during the 1938–39 season and averaged 3.3 points per game.

He is not related to teammate Little Moose Meyer, who happened to play alongside him with the Trojans.

== Career statistics ==
Legend
GP	Games played	FGM	Field goals made
FTM	Free throws made	FTA	Free throws attempted
FT%	Free throw percentage	PTS	Total points
PPG	Points per game	**Bold**	Career high

=== NBL ===
==== Regular season ====
Year	Team	GP	FGM	FTM	PTS	PPG
1937–38	Kankakee	9	14	2	30	3.3
