= Karl Atzenroth =

German businessman and politician (1895–1995)

Member of the Bundestag
- In office 7 September 1949 – 17 October 1965

Personal details
- Born: 22 September 1895 Köln
- Died: 18 June 1995 (aged 99)
- Party: FDP

Karl Atzenroth (22 September 1895 – 18 June 1995) was a German businessman and politician from the German Free Democratic Party.

Atzenroth was a member of the German Bundestag from 1949 to 1965. From 1953 until 12 December 1956, he was Deputy Chairman of the Parliamentary Committee for load balancing, from 20 June 1962 to 1965 Chairman of the Parliamentary Committee for development assistance. From 1957 to 8 January 1963, he was Chairman of the Working Group of economic policies of the FDP.
