= Sam Busich =

American football player (1913–1991)

Profile
- Position: End

Personal information
- Born: November 17, 1913; Lorain, Ohio, U.S.
- Died: February 1, 1991 (aged 77); Warren, Michigan, U.S.
- Listed height: 6 ft 3 in (1.91 m)
- Listed weight: 189 lb (86 kg)

Career information
- High school: Lorain
- College: Ohio State

Career history
- Boston Redskins (1936); Cleveland Rams (1937); Detroit Lions (1943)
- Stats at Pro Football Reference

Samuel Busich (November 17, 1913 – February 1, 1991) was an American professional football end in the National Football League (NFL) for the Boston Redskins, Cleveland Rams, and Detroit Lions. He also played professional basketball for the Columbus Athletic Supply in the National Basketball League (NBL) for one game in 1937–1938. Busich played both sports collegiately at Ohio State University.

Some sources say this athlete's name was Peter Paul Basich, though no newspaper or third party historical records have yet been found to verify that. Most sources point to his name being Samuel Busich.

== Career statistics ==
Legend
GP	Games played	FGM	Field goals made
FTM	Free throws made	FTA	Free throws attempted
FT%	Free throw percentage	PTS	Total points
PPG	Points per game	**Bold**	Career high

=== NBL ===
==== Regular season ====
Year	Team	GP	FGM	FTM	PTS	PPG
1937–38	Columbus	1	1	1	3	3.0
