= Mary Kirkwood =

Mary Burnett Kirkwood
- Self-portrait of Mary Kirkwood
- Born: Mary Burnett; December 21, 1904; Hillsboro, Oregon, United States
- Died: June 17, 1995 (aged 90)
- Known for: Painting
- Movement: Modern

Mary Kirkwood (December 21, 1904 – June 17, 1995) was an American artist and a professor at the University of Idaho from 1930 to 1970. Kirkwood earned a Bachelor of Arts degree from the University of Montana in Missoula, Montana, and a master of fine arts degree from the University of Oregon in Eugene, Oregon, and completed graduate work at the Royal Art School in Stockholm, Sweden and the College of Art Study Abroad in Paris. The same year, she began teaching at the University of Idaho as a professor of painting and history of painting, and remained with the university for 40 years, until retiring in 1970.

Kirkwood is credited with introducing University of Idaho students to modernist techniques and concepts. Her work is held in the collection of the University of Idaho and Portland Art Museum.

== Background ==
Mary Kirkwood was born in Hillsboro, Oregon, on December 21, 1904, at the home of her grandparents. Her family lived in Syracuse, New York, Mexico, and Tucson, Arizona before settling in Missoula, Montana, when she was four years old. Kirkwood remained in Missoula and graduated from the University of Montana in 1926. Four years later, in 1930, she earned her master of fine arts degree from the University of Oregon, where she was a member of Pi Lambda Delta.

== Influence ==
A number of her commissioned portraits hang at the University of Idaho. A 1980 painting titled Kate is in the collections at the Portland Art Museum in Portland, Oregon.

There is a scholarship in her name at the University of Idaho. The Jordan Schnitzer Museum of Art at the University of Oregon retains a 1930 painting in its archives of Adam and Eve, produced as part of Kirkwood's MFA degree.

== Work ==
=== Agricultural Science Building Mural ===
"...nothing could deter Assistant Professor Mary Kirkwood of Art as she sat on a scaffold day after day, painting a mural in the building's lobby. The mural depicted the State's varied types of agriculture, from wheat farming on the rolling Palouse Hills to row-cropping on the level, irrigated Snake River Plain."
