= Wesley Bennett =

American basketball player (1913–2002)

Personal information
- Born: March 13, 1913 Nashville, Tennessee, U.S.
- Died: August 20, 2002 (aged 89)
- Listed height: 6 ft 3 in (1.91 m)
- Listed weight: 175 lb (79 kg)

Career information
- High school: East (Akron, Ohio)
- College: Westminster (Pennsylvania)
- Position: Forward

Career history
- 1936–1937: Akron Non-Skids
- 1937–1939: Akron Wingfoots

Career highlights
- NBL champion (1938); Helms Player of the Year (1934); 2× All-American – Helms (1934, 1935)

Talmadge Wesley Bennett (March 31, 1913 – August 20, 2002) was an American basketball player who played for Westminster College where he twice led the nation in scoring and won honors as the Helms Foundation College Basketball Player of the Year in 1934. Bennett was a participant on the first college doubleheader played in New York City's Madison Square Garden on December 29, 1934, where he led Westminster to an upset over the hometown St. John's University team.

Born on March 31, 1913, in Nashville, Tennessee, Bennett moved to Akron, Ohio, with his family when he was five years old. He played for the basketball team at East High School (now East Community Learning Center), lettering in three seasons and making it to the finals of the state championships. He also played football there on the team that pinned the last defeat on the Massillon Washington High School team coached by Paul Brown that went undefeated for 35 consecutive games over seasons.

Playing for Westminster College in New Wilmington, Pennsylvania, Bennett racked up 1,168 points during his career, twice being named as an All-American and leading the nation in scoring in two seasons. He scored 21 points to lead Westminster to a 37–33 victory over St. John's University on December 29, 1934, in the opening game of the first collegiate doubleheader played at Madison Square Garden. Leading all scorers with 11 points, Bennett led Westminster two days later to a 28–24 win over City College of New York, marking CCNY's first loss at home after 42 consecutive victories.

After completing his degree at Westminster, Bennett played for industrial teams playing in the Amateur Athletic Union and the early National Basketball League for the Akron Firestone Non-Skids of Firestone Tire and Rubber Company for one season, followed by two seasons for the Akron Wingfoots representing Goodyear. Bennett enlisted in the United States Marine Corps, serving in the Pacific Theater and attained the rank of captain.

He became a resident of Solvang, California, where he lived with his wife, Janet, and their son.

== Career statistics ==
Legend
GP	Games played	FGM	Field goals made
FTM	Free throws made	FTA	Free throws attempted
FT%	Free throw percentage	PTS	Total points
PPG	Points per game	**Bold**	Career high

=== NBL ===
==== Regular season ====
Year	Team	GP	FGM	FTM	PTS	PPG
1937–38	Akron G. W.	15	28	31	87	**5.8**
1938–39	Akron G. W.	**22**	**36**	**37**	**109**	5.0
Career		37	64	68	196	5.3

==== Playoffs ====
Year	Team	GP	FGM	FTM	PTS	PPG
1937–38	Akron G. W.	5	10	5	25	5.0
