= Johnny Lenhart =

American basketball player

Personal information
- Born: December 4, 1915 Spencerport, New York
- Died: September 24, 1991 (aged 75)
- Listed height: 6 ft 4 in (1.93 m)
- Listed weight: 180 lb (82 kg)

Career information
- High school: Spencerport (New York, New York)
- College: Colgate (1934–1937)
- Position: Forward

Career history
- 1937: Buffalo Bisons
- 1940–1941: Brockport
- 1941–1944: Rochester IBM

John Williamson Lenhart (December 4, 1915 – September 24, 1991) was an American professional basketball player. He played for the Buffalo Bisons in the National Basketball League for three games during their 1937–38 season.
