= Keith Bennett (Canadian football) =

Canadian professional football player

William Keith Bennett
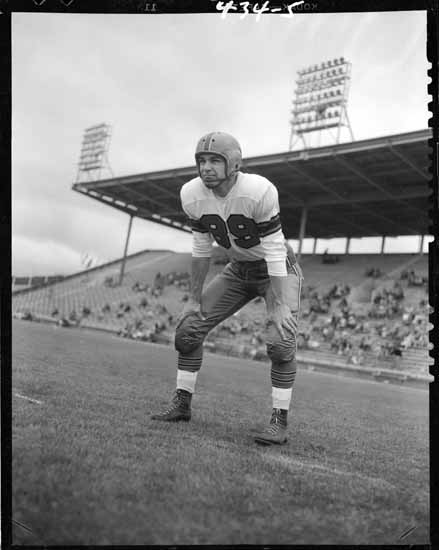
- Bennett in 1954

No. 89
- Positions: Halfback, Fullback, Linebacker

Personal information
- Born: February 23, 1931; Flin Flon, Manitoba, Canada
- Died: June 18, 1995 (aged 64); White Rock, British Columbia, Canada
- Listed height: 6 ft 0 in (1.83 m)
- Listed weight: 185 lb (84 kg)

Career history
- 1950–1953: Calgary Stampeders
- 1954–1955: BC Lions

William Keith Bennett (February 23, 1931 – June 18, 1995) was a Canadian professional football player who played for the Calgary Stampeders and BC Lions. He played junior football in Vancouver for the Junior Blue Bombers. He later moved to Dawson Creek, British Columbia and died in 1995.
