= Johnny McAdams =

American basketball player

Personal information
- Born: April 15, 1912 Urbana, Ohio, U.S.
- Died: October 18, 1975 (aged 63) Raleigh, North Carolina, U.S.
- Listed height: 5 ft 10 in (1.78 m)
- Listed weight: 147 lb (67 kg)

Career information
- High school: Urbana (Urbana, Ohio)
- College: Ohio Wesleyan (1935–1937)
- Position: Guard

Career history
- 1937–1940: Akron Goodyear Wingfoots

Career highlights
- NBL champion (1938)

John Wesley McAdams (April 15, 1912 – October 18, 1975) was an American professional basketball player. He played for the Akron Goodyear Wingfoots in the National Basketball League (NBL) from 1937 to 1940. For his career he averaged 2.1 points per game and helped lead the Wingfoots to the NBL championship in 1937–38.

In college, McAdams attended Ohio Wesleyan University, where he played both basketball and baseball.

== Career statistics ==
Legend
GP	Games played	FGM	Field goals made
FTM	Free throws made	FTA	Free throws attempted
FT%	Free throw percentage	PTS	Total points
PPG	Points per game	**Bold**	Career high

=== NBL ===
==== Regular season ====
Year	Team	GP	FGM	FTM	PTS	PPG
1937–38†	Akron G. W.	**6**	**6**	**1**	**13**	2.2
1938–39	Akron G. W.	2	2	0	4	2.0
Career		8	8	1	17	2.1

==== Playoffs ====
Year	Team	GP	FGM	FTM	PTS	PPG
1938†	Akron G. W.	3	2	0	4	1.3
