= Frank Jorgensen =

Australian rules footballer, born 1902

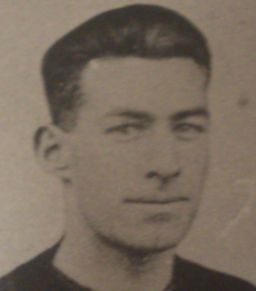

Personal information
- Full name: Francis Hollock Jorgensen
- Born: 19 August 1902; Bendigo, Victoria
- Died: 25 June 1995 (aged 92)
- Original team: South Bendigo
- Height: 180 cm (5 ft 11 in)
- Weight: 72 kg (159 lb)

Playing career^{1}
Years	Club	Games (Goals)
1923–24	Geelong	14 (4)
1925–27	Melbourne	13 (1)
Total		27 (5)
- ^{1} Playing statistics correct to the end of 1927.

Francis Hollock Jorgensen (19 August 1902 – 25 June 1995) was an Australian rules footballer who played with Geelong and Melbourne in the Victorian Football League (VFL).
