= Józef Arkusz =

Polish film director (1921–1995)

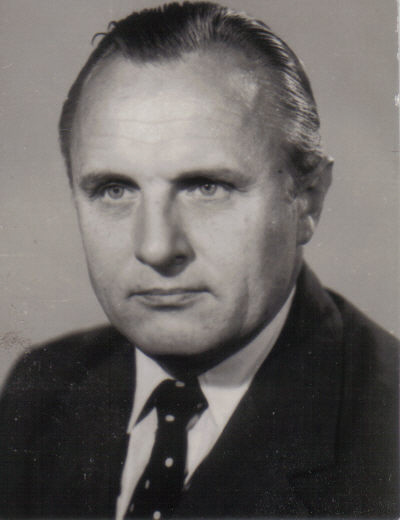
Józef Arkusz

Józef Arkusz (18 March 1921 – 29 June 1995) was a Polish film director and producer of over 70 educational films.

== Biography ==
Józef Arkusz was born on 18 March 1921 in Peratyn, Tarnopol Voivodeship (modern day Chervonohrad Raion, Lviv Oblast). His family moved to Lviv in the early 1930s. During World War II he took part in the underground movement Armia Krajowa, for which he was awarded the Officer's Cross of the Order of Polonia Restituta. Following the war, he moved to the industrial city of Łódź, in central Poland, where he began studying biology.

He attended the University of Poznań, and received a degree in Biology in 1950. He furthered his education by attending and graduating from the Łódż Film School in 1953.

He worked on minor films and projects until the 1960s when he began to be noticed by the international community. At this point, his career took off and he made some of his most famous educational films. Working at the Educational Film Studio (Wytwórnia Filmów Oświatowych) in Łódż, he created General Topic Films (Filmy Oświatowe), and is credited as being one of the most influential Polish documentary filmmakers. He pioneered new methods of filming and documentary production, which are now used as standard practice around the world. His film topics included technical and biological specialties and focused on new biological advances of the modern age.

He died in Łódź, Poland on Monday 19 June 1995.

== Filmography ==
- 1989 - Choroby Wywoływane Przez Grzyby (Diseases Caused by Fungi),
- 1986 - Wirusowe Zapalenie Watroby (Viral hepatitis),
- 1986 - Jamochłony,
- 1985 - Wincenty Wcisło,
- 1985 - Tajemniczy Mikroskop (Mysterious Microscope),
- 1984 - Nasz Organizm (Our Organism),
- 1984 - CO JEŚĆ I DLACZEGO (What to Eat and Why),
- 1982 - OPOWIEŚĆ O KROPLI WODY (Story About a Drop of Water),
- 1982 - BIOELEKTRONICZNA TAJEMNICA ŻYCIA (Bioelectronik Secrets of Life),
- 1981 - CZĄSTKI WODORU,
- 1979 - ŻYCIE I ODŻYWIANIE. BIOLOGIA ODŻYWIANIA (Biology of Nutrition),
- 1979 - OPOWIEŚĆ O OWADACH (Story of Insects),
- 1978 - Z Filmoteki Marczaka - Filmowa Pracownia,
- 1978 - Filmowa Pracownia,
- 1976 - ŻYCIE I ODŻYWIANIE. CZYNNOŚCI JELIT (Function of Intestines),
- 1976 - PRZEMYSŁ GÓRNEGO ŚLĄSKA (Silesian Industry),
- 1976 - PRACA ZASTAWEK SERCA (Function of Heart valves),
- 1976 - PODZIAŁ ZAPŁODNIONYCH KOMÓREK - BRUZDKOWANIE,
- 1976 - PODZIAŁ KOMÓRKI - MITOZA (Cell Division - Mitosis),
- 1975 - Praca Huty,
- 1975 - PRACA GÓRNIKA,
- 1975 - Ochrona Gleby (Preserving Earth),
- 1975 - ENERGIA WEWNĘTRZNA I JEJ ZMIANY (Energy Within),
- 1974 - ŻEBY WODY BYŁY WODAMI,
- 1973 - UPRAWA WARZYW W OGRZEWANYCH TUNELACH FOLIOWYCH,
- 1973 - GŁOWNIE PYŁKOWE PSZENICY, JĘCZMIENIA I OWSA,
- 1972 - ZWALCZANIE CHWASTÓW W WARZYWACH (War with Weeds),
- 1972 - Pługofrezarka,
- 1972 - Metody Produkcji Stali (Methods of Steel Production),
- 1972 - ELEKTRONIKA TRANZYSTORÓW (Electronic Properties of Transistors),
- 1972 - BUDOWA PIECA STALOWNICZEGO TANDEM,
- 1971 - Twoje Serce (Your Heart),
- 1971 - PRODUKCJA SURÓWKI,
- 1971 - PLONIARKA I NIEZMIARKA-SZKODNIKI ZBÓŻ,
- 1970 - ZWALCZANIE SZKODNIKÓW,
- 1970 - Tandem - Piec Stalowniczy,
- 1970 - SZKODNIKI MAGAZYNÓW ŻYWNOŚCIOWYCH,
- 1970 - REKULTYWACJA PIASKÓW,
- 1970 - PRACA PIECA STALOWNICZEGO "TANDEM",
- 1970 - OWADY - SZKODNIKI PÓL, SADÓW I LASÓW,
- 1970 - METODY WYKRYWANIA SZKODNIKÓW MAGAZYNÓW ŻYWNOŚCIOWYCH,
- 1970 - CHWASTY ZBÓŻ,
- 1969 - WPŁYW ŚRODOWISKA NA ROZWÓJ EMBRIONALNY (Influence of Environment on Embryology),
- 1969 - PIEC MARTENOWSKI,
- 1969 - BIOENERGETYKA SERCA (Bioenergy of the Heart),
- 1968 - PRZYRODNICZE PODSTAWY ZMIANOWANIA,
- 1968 - PRZYGOTOWANIE WSADU DO WIELKIEGO PIECA,
- 1968 - Polska Metoda Spawania Miedzi,
- 1968 - Od Rudy Do Stali,
- 1967 - Sanitariusze Morza,
- 1967 - Magia Zimna (Cold Fusion),
- 1967 - Alergia (Allergies),
- 1966 - TRAWIENIE U PRZEŻUWACZY,
- 1966 - CZYNNOŚCI SERCA (Function of the Heart),
- 1965 - UPRAWIAJMY POPLONY OZIME,
- 1965 - KREW KRĄŻĄCA (Circulating Blood),
- 1964 - PRZEMIANY W STALI,
- 1964 - Płastuga,
- 1964 - MORSKIE ZWIERZĘTA OSIADŁE,
- 1964 - HARTOWANIE STALI,
- 1963 - Życie Gleby (Living Earth),
- 1962 - Życie Trwa (Life Goes On),
- 1962 - ŹRÓDŁA ENERGETYCZNE KRĄŻENIA KRWI (Function of Circulatory System),
- 1962 - KRĄŻENIE WIEŃCOWE (Coronary Circulation),
- 1962 - DLACZEGO CHRONIMY ROPUCHĘ,
- 1962 - Biologia Żaby (Biology of Frogs),
- 1961 - Rak Pustelnik (Hermit Crab),
- 1961 - KORZENIONÓŻKI,
- 1960 - ZE ŚWIATA PLEŚNI (From the World of Molds),
- 1960 - SKRZYDLACI NURKOWIE,
- 1960 - PRZYBYSZE Z DALEKIEJ PÓŁNOCY,
- 1960 - Płaszczyniec Burakowy,
- 1960 - ODCZYN WIĄZANIA DOPEŁNIACZA,
- 1960 - NAKŁUCIE MOSTKA I BADANIE SZPIKU KOSTNEGO,
- 1959 - Molanna Z Piaskowego Domku,
- 1959 - Inseminacja (Artificial Insemination),
- 1957 - ŚWIATŁO W ŻYCIU ROŚLINY (Light in the Life Cycle of Plants),
- 1956 - O WODZIE, ROŚLINIE I SZPARKACH

== Trivia ==
- Józef Arkusz is credited with having created the first footage of the inside of a living beating heart using fiberoptics.
