= Paul Coleman (basketball) =

American basketball player (1915–1995)

Personal information
- Born: September 25, 1915 Lackawanna, New York, U.S.
- Died: June 14, 1995 (aged 79) Amherst, New York, U.S.
- Listed height: 6 ft 2 in (1.88 m)
- Listed weight: 160 lb (73 kg)

Career information
- College: Buffalo State (1933–1937)
- Position: Guard

Career history
- 1937–1938: Buffalo Bisons
- 1939–1940: Eldridge Pros
- 1940–1941: Buffalo Bisons
- 1941–1942: Cuba Reds

Paul Edward Coleman (September 25, 1915 – June 14, 1995) was an American professional basketball player. He played for the Buffalo Bisons in the National Basketball League and averaged 4.2 points per game. He earned varsity letters in soccer and basketball while attending Buffalo State College.
