= John McAdams (announcer) =

John McAdams (May 3, 1941 – June 16, 2005) public address announcer for Philadelphia Big 5 college basketball at the Palestra from the 1981–82 season to the 2004–05 season and for the Wilmington Blue Rocks Carolina League baseball team for 871 consecutive home games; he also was the announcer at Philadelphia Eagles home games.

== Biography ==
Known for his smooth, easy delivery. He was the PA Announcer for the Duke-Kentucky NCAA East Region Final in 1992 at the Spectrum when Duke's Christian Laettner beat Kentucky with his famous buzzer-beater jump shot. He was also the PA announcer for the 2005 NCAA Division I Men's Lacrosse Championship.

He did radio play-by-play for several Philadelphia area college basketball teams and was official scorer for both the Philadelphia Phillies and their AA affiliate, the Reading Phillies, scoring his final game for Reading night he died in his sleep. He frequently announced over 300 events a year, including men's and women's games on Big Five campuses and at Drexel, which has a banner in his memory on a wall in the Daskalakis Athletic Center. He was also a host on WIP Sports Talk radio.

McAdams was inducted into Philadelphia Big 5 Hall of Fame in 2007. He is honored with a microphone silhouette bearing his name on the outfield wall in center field at Frawley Stadium, the home of the Blue Rocks, near the retired numbers of players. He is also remembered annually with the John McAdams Service Award, which is presented by the Philadelphia Area Small College Basketball Association.
