= John McAdam (businessman) =

American businessman (born 1951)

- Born: February 1951; Wishaw, Scotland
- Education: University of Glasgow (BSc)
- Occupation: Business executive
- Known for: CEO of F5 Networks (2000–2015; 2015–2017)

John McAdam (born February 1951) is a technology executive who served as president and chief executive officer of F5 Networks from 2000 to 2015 and again from 2015 to 2017.

== Early life and education ==
McAdam was born in Wishaw, Scotland. He holds a B.Sc. in computer science from the University of Glasgow, Scotland.

== Career ==
Before joining F5, McAdam was president and chief operating officer of Sequent Computer Systems (1995–1999) and later served as general manager of IBM's web server sales business (1999–2000).

=== F5 Networks ===
McAdam joined F5 in July 2000 and led the company through a period of expansion, including its growth into a multibillion-dollar annual-revenue business while he was CEO.

In October 2014, the company announced that McAdam planned to retire as CEO at the end of fiscal year 2015, with the board indicating he would remain involved as non-executive chair.

McAdam was re-appointed to the position on December 14, 2015, following the resignation of Manuel Rivelo. In January 2017 F5 announced François Locoh-Donou would replace McAdam in April.

McAdam continued as a director after stepping down as CEO in 2017, and later did not stand for re-election to the board at F5's fiscal-year 2019 annual meeting (held March 12, 2020).

=== Board and advisory roles ===
McAdam has held board and advisory roles with technology companies and investors. In 2015, Madrona Venture Group named him a strategic director. He also served on the board of Nutanix beginning in 2015, and retired from that board at the company's annual meeting on December 13, 2019.

In 2019, he joined the board of directors of ExtraHop, a Seattle-based security company.

In October 2020, Brytlyt announced McAdam as chairman of its board. UK corporate filings list him as a director of Brytlyt Limited from October 2020 until March 2024, and also record other directorships, including roles at Quantexa (2019–2022) and Quality Clouds (appointed 2022).
