= John C. McAdams =

American political scientist (1945–2021)

John Charles McAdams (October 26, 1945 – April 15, 2021) was an American conservative and associate professor of political science at Marquette University. McAdams taught courses on American politics and public policy, voter behavior and the John F. Kennedy assassination. He ran a website on the assassination and published a book on the subject, JFK Assassination Logic: How to Think about Claims of Conspiracy (2011). He described himself as "a debunker by temperament". McAdams was suspended by Marquette in 2014 for publicly criticizing and sharing the first and last name of a graduate student teacher on his personal blog. McAdams filed suit for breach of contract and in 2018 the Wisconsin Supreme Court ordered the university to reinstate him.

== Biography ==
=== Early life and education ===
McAdams attended Kennedy High School in Kennedy, Alabama. He gained an undergraduate degree from the University of Alabama and a masters from Teachers College, Columbia University. He earned his PhD from Harvard University in 1981.

=== Career ===
McAdams taught courses on American politics and public policy and the John F. Kennedy assassination and has been published in the American Journal of Political Science, Journal of Politics, Sociological Quarterly, and Law and Contemporary Problems.

McAdams maintained The Kennedy Assassination Home Page, a website of articles, resources and links devoted to debunking various conspiracies regarding the assassination. The site has been called "impressively comprehensive", "the best gateway to serious and reliable materials" and "the best collection of Kennedy assassination-related information." He was also the moderator of the Usenet group alt.assassination.jfk. He is the author of the book JFK Assassination Logic: How to Think about Claims of Conspiracy (2011).

==== Controversy ====
On December 12, 2014, McAdams was placed on indefinite academic leave from Marquette University and suspended from all teaching and faculty duties, banned from campus but retaining pay and benefits. This indefinite suspension happened after McAdams publicly criticized a graduate student teacher by name in a post on his personal blog. He said the instructor had refused to allow a student in an ethics class to express their views against gay marriage in class because the instructor believed these views are homophobic and offensive. A letter from Marquette University indicated the firing was the result of his three times violating student privacy and deliberately publishing student names and information to target them for harassment and because he had done so in the third instance despite previously acknowledging that posting student names was a matter of concern.

On March 24, 2016, Marquette released an announcement detailing the decision of University President Michael Lovell, formally implementing the unanimous recommendation contained in a 123-page report composed by the Faculty Hearing Committee after a 4-day investigation. McAdams' suspension was extended until January 2017 without pay but with benefits and any return was conditioned on his writing a full letter of apology by April 4, 2016. McAdams told local news media that the requirement to write an apology was "a deal killer. No, I'm not going to do that." The announcement triggered a barrage of hateful and threatening messages and emails directed at the graduate student and at Marquette University officials. The graduate student later transferred to another university, saying she feared for her safety. More than a year after the graduate student left the school, McAdams continued to publish on his blog about her, including disclosure of the university she attended after Marquette.

On April 4, 2016, McAdams issued a 4-page letter to President Lovell, formally rejecting his demands and calling them "compelled speech."

McAdams filed a lawsuit against Marquette, alleging the suspension and pending dismissal amounted to a breach of contract. In response the university released the 123-page Faculty Hearing Committee report, which alleged a pattern of bullying and reckless behavior by McAdams, including at least three previous attempts to intimidate fellow faculty members by threatening to publish their names to his blog.

In July 2018, the Wisconsin Supreme Court ordered the university to reinstate him. Following a sabbatical, McAdams returned to the university in 2019.

=== Death ===
McAdams died on April 15, 2021.

== Politics ==
McAdams has been described as a "vocal conservative" and was a proponent of capital punishment. In 2006, he testified before the Constitution, Civil Rights and Human Rights Subcommittee of the United States Senate Committee on the Judiciary as an expert on capital punishment.

McAdams ran the blog Marquette Warrior which was linked, along with several other blogs, to a pro-Walmart PR effort.

== Books ==
- JFK Assassination Logic: How to Think about Claims of Conspiracy, Potomac Books, 2011
- The New Class in Post-Industrial Society, Palgrave Macmillan, 2015
- What Your Professors Won’t Tell You: Political Correctness Meets Social Science, KBook Publishing, 2024
