= Russ Ochsenhirt =

American basketball player

Personal information
- Born: April 16, 1912 Sharpsburg, Pennsylvania, U.S.
- Died: October 4, 2002 (aged 90) Akron, Ohio, U.S.
- Listed height: 6 ft 3 in (1.91 m)
- Listed weight: 195 lb (88 kg)

Career information
- High school: Perry (Pittsburgh, Pennsylvania)
- College: Pittsburgh (1931–1934)
- Position: Forward

Career history
- 1934–1939: Akron Goodyear Wingfoots

Career highlights
- MBC champion (1937); NBL champion (1938)

Russell William Ochsenhirt (April 16, 1912 – October 4, 2002) was an American basketball player whose career started as a student-athlete at the University of Pittsburgh. He played basketball for four seasons, serving as captain of the 1933–34 team. He was named to Liberty magazine's All-American first team in 1934 and was twice selected to the All-Eastern Intercollegiate honor squad. After he graduated with a degree in electrical engineering, Ochsenhirt moved to Akron, Ohio, where he took a management position with Goodyear Tire and Rubber. He also joined the Goodyear Wingfoots basketball team. He was captain of the 1937–38 squad, which won the championship of the National Basketball League, the forerunner of the National Basketball Association.
