= Goodyear Hall-Ohio Savings and Trust Company =

- U.S. National Register of Historic Places
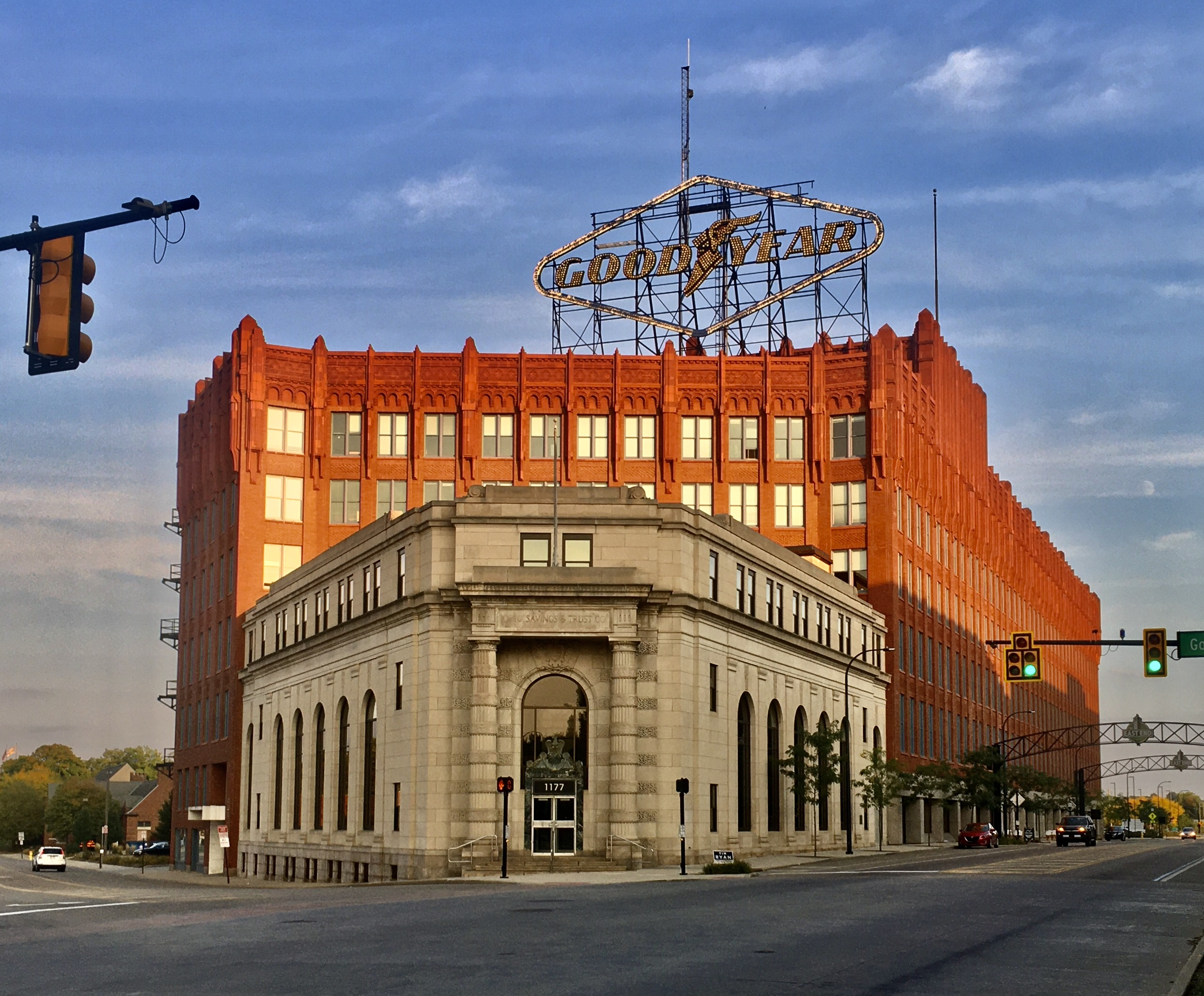
- The Ohio Savings and Trust Company building (front) and Goodyear Hall (rear) as seen in September 2020.

- Location within Ohio Location within the United States
- Location: 1201 E. Market St., Akron, Ohio
- Coordinates: 41°4′0″N 81°28′58″W
- Built: 1920
- NRHP reference No.: 14000030
- Added to NRHP: February 24, 2014

Goodyear Hall-Ohio Savings and Trust Company (currently a multi-purpose building with residential and retail tenants) is a historic building located in Akron, Ohio, U.S. The building is situated at 1201 E. Market Street, at the corner of Goodyear Boulevard and East Market Street. The structure is seven stories in height, built of brick and tile.

== Architecture and fittings ==
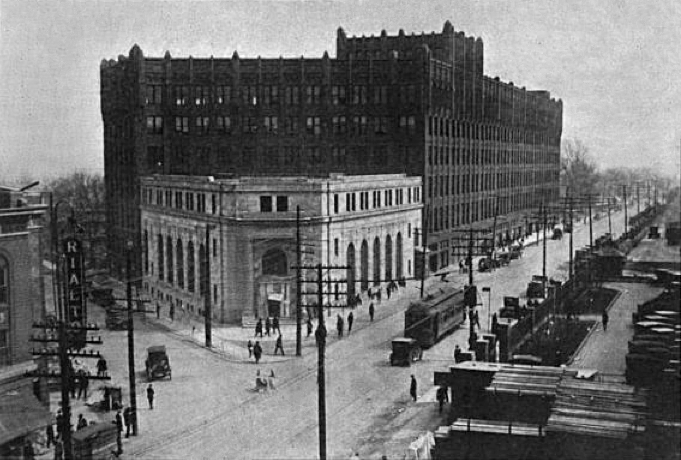
Goodyear Hall in 1920

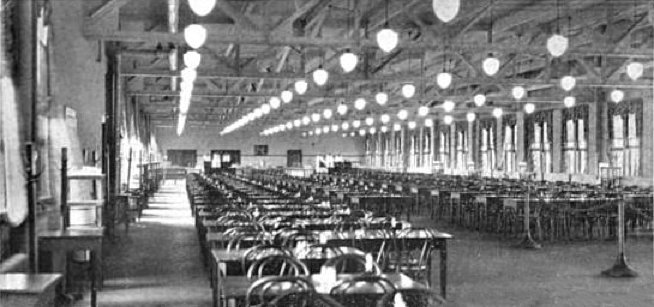
Goodyear Hall cafeteria

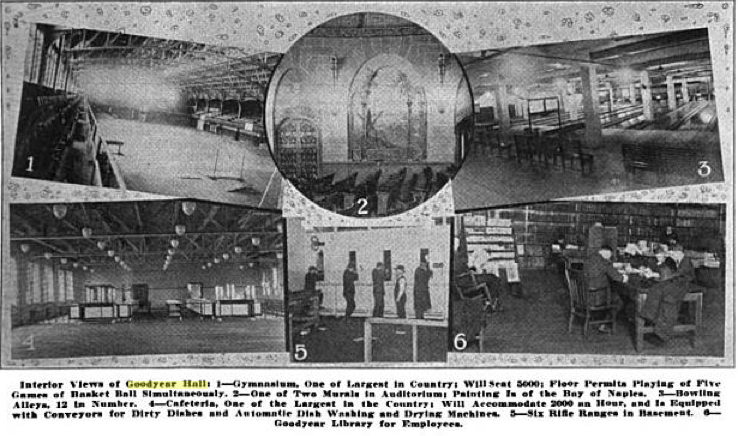
Goodyear Hall interior views

Completed in 1920, the industrial university and recreational institution was developed by Goodyear Tire and Rubber Company for the welfare of its employees. The building included an auditorium with a seating capacity of 1,686, the largest stage and theater in Akron in its time, and one of the largest in Ohio. The gymnasium was comparable to a college indoor athletic stadium. There were bowling alleys, target and rifle ranges, Goodyear university, and a cafeteria capable of accommodating 8,000 daily. Dormitory rooms were available for both men and women, in addition to recreational rooms and the library. There were three entrances, two on East Market and one through the gymnasium.

Wide corridors bisected the main floor longitudinally, separating the 12 store rooms and the auditorium and gymnasium. The auditorium was well appointed. Its main floor and suspended balcony seated 1,686. The stage was 40 feet (12 m) across, with double apertures, so as to permit its use by both the main auditorium and gymnasium. The gymnasium had a seating capacity of 5,000 people. An indirect lighting system was used throughout the auditorium with the exception of hanging candle fixtures which case a glow upon mural panels arranged on the side wall. A French Renaissance decoration scheme was used. The large gymnasium with gallery had a floor space of 172 by 100 feet (52 m × 30 m), large enough to permit five basketball games simultaneously. This made the Goodyear Hall a perfect venue for their Akron Goodyear Wingfoots team to play professional basketball games back when they played in the National Basketball League and then the National Industrial Basketball League.

On the second floor, in addition to the auditorium balcony and emporium and balcony to the gymnasium, were tool rooms, writing and music rooms, a large and well equipped library, and a large community room for men. An industrial cafeteria, equipped with culinary appliance also occupied the second floor. Dormitories for 300 men were situated on the triangular space near the intersection of Goodyear Avenue and East Market Street.

On the third floor were located the legislative chambers of the House of Representatives and Senate of the Goodyear Industrial Republic. Well-equipped committee and secretaries' rooms adjoined the house and senate. A large girls' community hall was also housed on this floor. As on the floor below, the triangular space was used for dormitories for girls until other housing places were found. The remainder of this floor was devoted to women's recreational rooms, including a large assembly room for sewing and domestic science classes. This floor also included dormitory provisions for women.

The fourth floor was given over to "Goodyear University" with accommodation for 5,500 students. There were 65 class rooms and studies which were augmented by fully equipped laboratories on the fourth and fifth floors. Near the front of the building, there was a large student's assembly room.

On the seventh floor, there was a well-equipped picture department. Films were used for educational purposes in classrooms to teach students the details of various operations of manufacturing rubber products. There were also facilities for developing and screening pictures to be used in Akron and in branches all over the world.

In the basement, there were locker rooms with 5,500 lockers, 12 bowling alleys, six rifle ranges, a large clothes checking room and a barber shop. A tunnel from the factory building across the street was created give access to the basement.

== The Residences at East End ==
Renovation plans by the developer Industrial Realty Group were underway in 2014 to convert the structure into a multipurpose building with residential and retail tenants. In 2015, it was reported that retail space was developed on the first floor and that 105 apartments were being built out on upper floors, named The Residences at East End.

== See also ==
- National Register of Historic Places listings in Akron, Ohio

== Bibliography ==
- The Accessory and Garage Journal (1920). The Accessory and Garage Journal. Vol. X, No. 1. Pawtucket, Rhode Island: The Accessory and Garage Journal.
- India Rubber Review Company (1920). India Rubber & Tire Review. Vol. 20. India Rubber Review Company.
