= Chuck Bloedorn =

American basketball player

Personal information
- Born: May 28, 1912 Chicago, Illinois, U.S.
- Died: May 20, 1998 (aged 85) Pinehurst, North Carolina, U.S.
- Listed height: 6 ft 0 in (1.83 m)
- Listed weight: 180 lb (82 kg)

Career information
- High school: Carl Schurz (Chicago, Illinois)
- College: Illinois Tech (1929–1933)
- Position: Guard

Career history

Playing
- 1933–1934: Babe Didrickson's All-Americans
- 1934–1936: Chicago
- 1936–1937: Chicago Brandt Florist
- 1936–1940: Akron Goodyear Wingfoots
- 1940–1944: Akron Collegians
- 1944–1945: Rochester Guards
- 1946–1947: Akron Goodyear
- 1947–1948: Akron Collegians

Coaching
- 1950–1953: Akron Goodyear

Career highlights
- MBC champion (1937); NBL champion (1938); All-NBL First Team (1938); All-NBL Second Team (1939)

Charles Ervin Bloedorn Jr. (May 28, 1912 – May 20, 1998) was an American professional basketball player. He played for the Akron Goodyear Wingfoots in the National Basketball League from 1937 to 1940.

Bloedorn also played one season of minor league baseball, for the Louisville Colonels in 1934.
