= Ray Morstadt =

American basketball player (1913–1965)

Personal information
- Born: March 10, 1913 Waukegan, Illinois, U.S.
- Died: July 5, 1965 (aged 52) Waukegan, Illinois, U.S.
- Listed height: 6 ft 2 in (1.88 m)
- Listed weight: 220 lb (100 kg)

Career information
- College: Marquette (1933–1936)
- Playing career: 1935–1940
- Position: Power forward / center

Career history
- 1935–1936: Akron Goodyear
- 1936–1940: Akron Goodyear Wingfoots

Career highlights
- MBC champion (1937); Third-team All-American – Literary Digest (1934)

Raymond Charles Morstadt (March 10, 1913 – July 5, 1965) was an American professional basketball player. He played for the Akron Goodyear Wingfoots in the National Basketball League and averaged 3.5 points per game.
