= Neil O'Donnell (basketball) =

American basketball player (1914–1996)

Personal information
- Born: April 17, 1914 Buffalo, New York, U.S.
- Died: December 27, 1996 (aged 82) Cheektowaga, New York, U.S.
- Listed height: 6 ft 5 in (1.96 m)
- Listed weight: 210 lb (95 kg)

Career information
- College: Canisius (1934–1937)
- Position: Power forward / center

Career history
- 1937–1938: Buffalo Bisons

Cornelius Patrick "Neil" O'Donnell (April 17, 1914 – December 27, 1996) was an American professional basketball player. He played for the Buffalo Bisons in the National Basketball League for nine games during the 1937–38 season and averaged 3.9 points per game.

Neil was the younger brother of Jim O'Donnell, who also played on the Bisons in 1937–38.

== Career statistics ==
Legend
GP	Games played	FGM	Field goals made
FTM	Free throws made	FTA	Free throws attempted
FT%	Free throw percentage	PTS	Total points
PPG	Points per game	**Bold**	Career high

=== NBL ===
==== Regular season ====
Year	Team	GP	FGM	FTM	PTS	PPG
1937–38	Buffalo	9	14	7	35	3.9
