= Akron Goodyear Wingfoots =

- Leagues: Independent: 1918–23; Amateur Athletic Union: 1923–31; National Industrial League: 1931–36; National Professional Basketball League: 1932–33; Midwest Basketball Conference: 1936–37; NBL: 1937–42; Suspended operations due to World War II: 1942–46; NIBL: 1946–61; National AAU Basketball League: 1961–73; Independent: 1973–80; AAU Elite: 1980–present
- Founded: 1918
- Arena: Akron Goodyear Hall (4,000)
- Team colors: Cobalt blue, Gold, Crimson, White -
- Championships: 1 National Industrial League (1932); 1 Midwest Basketball Conference Championship (1937); 1 National Basketball League Championship (1938); 2 AAU National Tournaments (1964, 1967); 3 FIBA Intercontinental Cups (1967, 1968, 1969); 3 National AAU Basketball League (1967, 1968, 1969)
Home	Away	Third

The Akron Goodyear Wingfoots are one of the oldest basketball teams in the United States. They were founded in 1918, by the workers at the Goodyear Tire Company, in Akron, Ohio. The teams, while giving workers recreation, also helped to promote one of the first canvas/rubber based shoes made specifically for athletics, the wingfoot.

== History ==
=== 1931–37: Post AAU era ===
The Wingfoots joined the National Basketball League for the 1932–1933 season, playing against strong teams like Indianapolis Kautskys and Akron Firestone Non-Skids (the latter were crowned champions). They moved to the Midwest Basketball Conference in 1936 (Chicago Duffy Florals were the reigning champions), facing teams such as: the Indianapolis Kautskys, Harlem Globetrotters, Sheboygan Red Skins, and the New York Renaissance. They won the league title in 1937, after defeating Fort Wayne, in a best of three games series sweep.

=== 1937–42: NBL success ===
In the late 1930s, Goodyear, Firestone, General Electric, and other companies with similar Amateur Athletic Union (AAU) Elite teams, decided to form the National Basketball League (NBL) to showcase their teams (it was actually that the MBC changed its name to the NBL). The Wingfoots won the first NBL title in 1938. During the 1938–1939 season, the Akron Goodyear Wingfoots finished second in the National Basketball League's Eastern Division. The team finished behind the Akron Firestone Non-Skids, another team from Akron, each season. However, the Wingfoots did capture the league's first championship, after an impressive playoff run. During the 1939–1940 season, the Wingfoots finished third in the Eastern Division, winning exactly fifty percent of the team's games. During the next season, the squad finished next to last in the National Basketball League. During the 1941–1942 season, the Akron Goodyear Wingfoots experienced a turnaround, finishing third in the National Basketball League. The team, however, lost in the first round of the playoffs. While the Goodyear franchise did try to compete for the 1942–1943 season (even if they ultimately opted out on playing in the NBL that season), a poor performance on the court and a declining number of men available to play due to World War II caused the Akron Goodyear Wingfoots to suspend operations as a franchise before the season's end, with them ultimately not returning to operations until a year after World War II concluded.

=== 1946–61: NIBL ===
The Akron Goodyear Wingfoots joined the National Industrial Basketball League in 1946, and became an integrated part of the league. They never met any success, as the Bartlesville Phillips 66ers dominated in winning the titles. In 15 seasons, their record was 126 wins and 139 losses.

=== 1961–73: NABL and FIBA Intercontinental Cups ===
The team was not a part of the BAA and NBL merger that created the NBA. Instead, they reconstituted those NBL teams left over into the National Industrial Basketball League. The Wingfoots regained national power in the NIBL, which in 1960, was changed to the National Alliance of Basketball Leagues. They joined the NABL in the 1960s, and continued to play there until the late 1970s. They also represented USA basketball at the FIBA Intercontinental Cup, which is organized by FIBA World. In 1964, they won their first AAU tournament, after beating their bitter rivals, the Phillips 66ers, in the final. They won the AAU championship again, once again beating the Phillips 66ers, in 1967.

=== 1973–present ===
Always a stepping stone for new leagues such as the NBA, the American Basketball League (ABL), and the American Basketball Association (ABA), the Wingfoots stopped playing a national schedule in the mid-1970s, and after the NABL was dropped in favor of touring teams, Goodyear Tire stopped sponsoring the team. In the 1980s, team sponsorship was picked up by Tom Ficara and Reach Entertainment, and the team today plays year-round all over the world. The Wingfoots are the only AAU Elite team that still plays a full college schedule. Although the team has not yet returned to its previous glory, it has again started playing in the historic AAU National Tournament.

== Akron Goodyear Wingfoots Finals ==
MBC Finals

- 1937 Akron Goodyear Wingfoots – Fort Wayne General Electrics 2–0 (series)

NBL Finals

- 1938 Akron Goodyear Wingfoots – Oshkosh All-Stars 2–1 (series)

AAU tournaments

- 1964 Akron Goodyear Wingfoots – Phillips 66ers 86–78
- 1967 Akron Goodyear Wingfoots – Phillips 66ers 77–62

FIBA Intercontinental Cups

- January 7, 1967, Palazzetto dello Sport, Rome (15,000): Akron Goodyear Wingfoots – Ignis Varese 78–72

Akron Goodyear Wingfoots (Henry "Hank" Vaughn): Vern Benson 3, Jim Rayl 20, Jay Miller 22, Jim King 2, Mike McCoy 13 – Calvin Fowler 4, Ed Corell 6, Dan Anderson 6, Mike Dabich 2

- January 6, 1968, Spectrum, Philadelphia (17,000): Akron Goodyear Wingfoots – Real Madrid 105–73

Akron Goodyear Wingfoots (Henry "Hank" Vaughn): Calvin Fowler 22, Jerry Curless 8, Jim King 12, Tom Duff 10, Tom Black 14 – Dennis Berholtz 6, Randy Berentz 20, Gary Williams 2, John Schroeder 4, Mike Patterson 5, Ed McKae 2

- January 26, 1969, Macon Coliseum, Macon (2,000): Akron Goodyear Wingfoots – Spartak ZJŠ Brno 84–71

Akron Goodyear Wingfoots (Henry "Hank" Vaughn): Pete Cunningham 12, Jerry Curless 8, Randy Berentz 16, Mike Patterson 9, Grady Norman 14 – John Schroeder 2, Stewart 9, Worstell 8, Gallagher 2, Fonts 4

== Professional team seasons ==
Season	League	Name	W	L	%	Standings	Playoffs
1932–33	NPBL	Akron Goodyear Wingfoots	2	4	33.3	4th	—
1936–37	MBC	Akron Goodyear Wingfoots	16	2	88.9	1st	MBC Champions
1937–38	NBL	Akron Goodyear Wingfoots	13	5	72.2	2nd	NBL Champions
1938–39	NBL	Akron Goodyear Wingfoots	14	14	50.0	2nd	—
1939–40	NBL	Akron Goodyear Wingfoots	14	14	50.0	3rd	—
1940–41	NBL	Akron Goodyear Wingfoots	11	13	45.8	6th	—
1941–42	NBL	Akron Goodyear Wingfoots	15	9	62.5	3rd	NBL Semifinals

== Trophies ==
The Akron Wingfoots won the FIBA Intercontinental Cup 3 times (1967, 1968, 1969) against Spartak Brno, Ignis Varese and Real Madrid. They were also the first winner of the National Basketball League, which later formed the NBA.

- National Basketball League: 1 (1937–1938)
- FIBA Intercontinental Cup: 3 (1967, 1968, 1969)
- AAU National Tournament: 2 (1964, 1967)
- National AAU Basketball League: 3 (1967, 1968, 1969)
- Midwest Basketball Conference: 1 (1937)
- National Industrial League: 1 (1932)

== Notable players ==
Several Wingfoots' players represented the Team USA at the Summer Olympics, the Pan American Games, and the FIBA World Cup. Here is a list of those players, and the number of games they played for the USA national team are in brackets.

- Calvin Fowler: United States (18)

Calvin B. Fowler was the captain of the United States gold medal basketball team at the 1967 Pan American Games. He played for the Wingfoots for 10 years (1960–1970), and he was an active international player between 1967 and 1968.

- Pete McCaffrey: United States (16)

Pete McCaffrey played for the gold medal-winning United States men's national basketball team at the 1964 Summer Olympics. He also played at the 1963 FIBA World Championship, where the United States finished fourth.

- Adrian Smith: United States (13)

After playing for the Wingfoots in 1961, Adrian Smith signed with the Cincinnati Royals, where he stayed for 8 seasons. He was selected to the 1966 NBA All-Star Game, and he was named the MVP, after he scored 24 points in 26 minutes. In the 1969–70 season, after 32 games with the Royals, Smith was traded to the San Francisco Warriors. In the 1971–72 season, he played with the American Basketball Association's Virginia Squires. He played on the USA's 1960 Summer Olympics basketball team. All of the players on that team, including Smith, were inducted into the Naismith Memorial Basketball Hall of Fame.

=== Akron Wingfoots players on Team USA ===
- Larry Brown: played at the 1964 Summer Olympics
- Richard Davies: played at the 1964 Summer Olympics
- Pete McCaffrey: played at the 1964 Summer Olympics
- Jim King: played at the 1968 Summer Olympics
- Henry Vaughn: participated at the 1963 FIBA World Championship (assistant coach), the 1964 Summer Olympics (assistant coach), the 1963 Pan American Games (assistant coach), and the 1970 FIBA World Championship (assistant coach)
- Vern Benson: played at the 1967 FIBA World Championship
- Chuck Bloedorn: participated at the 1967 Pan American Games (team manager)
- Calvin Fowler: played at the 1967 Pan American Games (captain) and the 1968 Summer Olympics

==== Other notable players ====
- Lee Huber
- Bob Parsons
- Harold Hull
- Rudy Debnar
- Skouson Harker
- Walt Walowac
