= List of Pittsburgh Panthers men's basketball seasons =

The Pittsburgh Panthers men's basketball team has a combined record of 1,698 wins and 1,244 losses since their inception in 1905. The list is accurate as of March 30, 2025.

== Seasons ==
Statistics overview
Season	Coach	Overall	Conference	Standing	Postseason
Benjamin Printz (Independent) (1905–1907)
1905–06	Benjamin Printz	2–9			
1906–07	Benjamin Printz	6–5			
Harry Hough (Independent) (1907–1908)
1907–08	Harry Hough	10–6			
Wohlparth Wegner (Independent) (1910–1911)
1910–11	Wohlparth Wegner	6–6			
George Flint (Independent) (1911–1921)
1911–12	George Flint	10–9			
1912–13	George Flint	15–7			
1913–14	George Flint	7–8			
1914–15	George Flint	14–4			
1915–16	George Flint	15–2			
1916–17	George Flint	12–6			
1917–18	George Flint	5–9			
1918–19	George Flint	7–7			
1919–20	George Flint	9–6			
1920–21	George Flint	12–9			
Andrew Kerr (Independent) (1921–1922)
1921–22	Andrew Kerr	12–8			
Doc Carlson (Independent) (1922–1932)
1922–23	Doc Carlson	10–5			
1923–24	Doc Carlson	10–7			
1924–25	Doc Carlson	4–10			
1925–26	Doc Carlson	11–6			
1926–27	Doc Carlson	10–7			
1927–28	Doc Carlson	21–0			Helms Foundation National Champion
1928–29	Doc Carlson	16–5			
1929–30	Doc Carlson	23–2			Helms Foundation National Champion
1930–31	Doc Carlson	20–4			
1931–32	Doc Carlson	14–16			
Doc Carlson (Eastern Intercollegiate Conference) (1932–1939)
1932–33	Doc Carlson	17–5	7–1	1st	
1933–34	Doc Carlson	18–4	8–0	1st	
1934–35	Doc Carlson	18–6	6–2	1st^{[Note A]}	American Legion Bowl
1935–36	Doc Carlson	18–9	7–3	2nd^{[Note B]}	
1936–37	Doc Carlson	14–7	7–3	1st^{[Note C]}	
1937–38	Doc Carlson	9–12	5–5	T–3rd	
1938–39	Doc Carlson	10–8	5–5	T–3rd	
Doc Carlson (Independent) (1939–1953)
1939–40	Doc Carlson	8–9			
1940–41	Doc Carlson	13–6			NCAA Final Four
1941–42	Doc Carlson	5–10			
1942–43	Doc Carlson	10–5			
1943–44	Doc Carlson	7–7			
1944–45	Doc Carlson	8–4			
1945–46	Doc Carlson	7–7			
1946–47	Doc Carlson	8–10			
1947–48	Doc Carlson	10–11			
1948–49	Doc Carlson	12–13			
1949–50	Doc Carlson	4–14			
1950–51	Doc Carlson	9–17			
1951–52	Doc Carlson	10–12			
1952–53	Doc Carlson	12–11			
Bob Timmons (Independent) (1953–1968)
1953–54	Bob Timmons	9–14			
1954–55	Bob Timmons	10–16			
1955–56	Bob Timmons	15–10			
1956–57	Bob Timmons	16–11			NCAA University Division Sweet Sixteen
1957–58	Bob Timmons	18–7			NCAA University Division first round
1958–59	Bob Timmons	10–14			
1959–60	Bob Timmons	11–14			
1960–61	Bob Timmons	12–11			
1961–62	Bob Timmons	12–11			
1962–63	Bob Timmons	19–6			NCAA University Division first round
1963–64	Bob Timmons	17–8			NIT first round
1964–65	Bob Timmons	7–16			
1965–66	Bob Timmons	5–17			
1966–67	Bob Timmons	6–19			
1967–68	Bob Timmons	7–15			
Charles Ridl (Independent) (1968–1975)
1968–69	Charles Ridl	4–20			
1969–70	Charles Ridl	12–12			
1970–71	Charles Ridl	14–10			
1971–72	Charles Ridl	12–12			
1972–73	Charles Ridl	12–14			
1973–74	Charles Ridl	25–4			NCAA Division I Elite Eight
1974–75	Charles Ridl	18–11			NIT Quarterfinal
Tim Grgurich (Independent) (1975–1976)
1975–76	Tim Grgurich	12–15			
Tim Grgurich (Eastern Collegiate Basketball League / Eastern Athletic Association) (1976–1980)
1976–77	Tim Grgurich	6–21	1–9	4th (West)	
1977–78	Tim Grgurich	16–11	5–5	T–3rd	
1978–79	Tim Grgurich	18–11	6–4	4th	
1979–80	Tim Grgurich	17–12	5–5	T–4th	NIT first round
Roy Chipman (Eastern Athletic Association) (1980–1982)
1980–81	Roy Chipman	19–12	8–5	4th	NCAA Division I second round
1981–82	Roy Chipman	20–10	8–6	3rd	NCAA Division I first round
Roy Chipman (Big East Conference) (1982–1986)
1982–83	Roy Chipman	13–15	6–10	6th	
1983–84	Roy Chipman	18–13	6–10	6th	NIT Quarterfinal
1984–85	Roy Chipman	17–12	8–8	5th	NCAA Division I first round
1985–86	Roy Chipman	15–14	6–10	6th	NIT first round
Paul Evans (Big East Conference) (1986–1994)
1986–87	Paul Evans	25–8	12–4	T–1st	NCAA Division I second round
1987–88	Paul Evans	24–7	12–4	1st	NCAA Division I second round
1988–89	Paul Evans	17–13	9–7	4th	NCAA Division I first round
1989–90	Paul Evans	12–17	5–11	8th	
1990–91	Paul Evans	21–12	9–7	T–3rd	NCAA Division I second round
1991–92	Paul Evans	18–16	9–9	7th	NIT second round
1992–93	Paul Evans	17–11	9–9	6th	NCAA Division I first round
1993–94	Paul Evans	13–14	7–11	8th	
Ralph Willard (Big East Conference) (1994–1999)
1994–95	Ralph Willard	10–18	5–13	9th	
1995–96	Ralph Willard	10–17	5–13	7th (BE7)	
1996–97	Ralph Willard	18–15	10–8	T–2nd (BE7)	NIT second round
1997–98	Ralph Willard	11–16	6–12	T–5th (BE7)	
1998–99	Ralph Willard	14–16	5–13	9th	
Ben Howland (Big East Conference) (1999–2003)
1999–00	Ben Howland	13–15	5–11	11th	
2000–01	Ben Howland	19–14	7–9	5th (West)	NIT second round
2001–02	Ben Howland	29–6	13–3	1st (West)	NCAA Division I Sweet Sixteen
2002–03	Ben Howland	28–5	13–3	T–1st (West)	NCAA Division I Sweet Sixteen
Jamie Dixon (Big East Conference) (2003–2013)
2003–04	Jamie Dixon	31–5	13–3	1st	NCAA Division I Sweet Sixteen
2004–05	Jamie Dixon	20–9	10–6	5th	NCAA Division I first round
2005–06	Jamie Dixon	25–8	10–6	T–4th	NCAA Division I second round
2006–07	Jamie Dixon	29–8	12–4	T–2nd	NCAA Division I Sweet Sixteen
2007–08	Jamie Dixon	27–10	10–8	7th	NCAA Division I second round
2008–09	Jamie Dixon	31–5	15–3	T–2nd	NCAA Division I Elite Eight
2009–10	Jamie Dixon	25–9	13–5	T–2nd	NCAA Division I second round
2010–11	Jamie Dixon	28–6	15–3	1st	NCAA Division I second round
2011–12	Jamie Dixon	22–17	5–13	T–13th	CBI Champion
2012–13	Jamie Dixon	24–9	12–6	4th	NCAA Division I first round
Jamie Dixon (Atlantic Coast Conference) (2013–2016)
2013–14	Jamie Dixon	26–10	11–7	5th	NCAA Division I second round
2014–15	Jamie Dixon	19–15	8–10	T–9th	NIT first round
2015–16	Jamie Dixon	21–12	9–9	T–9th	NCAA Division I first round
Kevin Stallings (Atlantic Coast Conference) (2016–2018)
2016–17	Kevin Stallings	16–17	4–14	T–13th	
2017–18	Kevin Stallings	8–24	0–18	15th	
Jeff Capel (Atlantic Coast Conference) (2018–present)
2018–19	Jeff Capel	14–19	3–15	T–14th	
2019–20	Jeff Capel	16–17	6–14	T–13th	No postseason held
2020–21	Jeff Capel	10–12	6–10	12th	
2021–22	Jeff Capel	11–21	6–14	T–11th	
2022–23	Jeff Capel	24–12	14–6	T–3rd	NCAA Division I second round
2023–24	Jeff Capel	22–11	12–8	4th	Declined NIT invitation
2024–25	Jeff Capel	17–15	8–12	T–9th	Declined all postseason play
2025–26	Jeff Capel	13–20	5–13	15th	
Total:		1,711–1,264			
National champion Postseason invitational champion Conference regular season champion Conference regular season and conference tournament champion Division regular season champion Division regular season and conference tournament champion Conference tournament champion

^A. The Eastern Intercollegiate Conference held a single-game playoff for first place in the event of a tie at the end of the regular season. Conference record excludes single-game conference playoff victory.
^B. The Eastern Intercollegiate Conference held a single-game playoff for first place in the event of a tie at the end of the regular season. Conference record excludes single-game conference playoff loss after regular season.
^C. The Eastern Intercollegiate Conference held a single-game playoff for first place in the event of a tie at the end of the regular season. Conference record excludes single-game conference playoff victory after regular season.
