= Pittsburgh Panthers men's basketball =

Basketball team of the University of Pittsburgh

2026–27 Pittsburgh Panthers men's basketball team
- University: University of Pittsburgh
- First season: 1905–06; 121 years ago
- Athletic director: Allen Greene
- Head coach: Jeff Capel; 9th season, 127–127 (.500)
- Location: Pittsburgh, Pennsylvania
- Arena: Petersen Events Center (capacity: 12,508)
- NCAA division: Division I
- Conference: ACC
- Nickname: Panthers
- Colors: Blue and gold
- Student section: Oakland Zoo
- All-time record: 1,728–1,279 (.575)
- NCAA tournament record: 26–28 (.481)

NCAA Division I tournament Final Four
- 1941
Other NCAA Division I tournament results
Elite Eight	1941, 1974, 2009
Sweet Sixteen	1957, 1974, 2002, 2003, 2004, 2007, 2009
Appearances	1941, 1957, 1958, 1963, 1974, 1981, 1982, 1985, 1987, 1988, 1989, 1991, 1993, 2002, 2003, 2004, 2005, 2006, 2007, 2008, 2009, 2010, 2011, 2013, 2014, 2016, 2023

Pre-tournament Helms national champions
- 1927–28, 1929–30

Conference tournament champions
- Eastern 8: 1981, 1982 Big East: 2003, 2008

Conference regular-season champions
- EIC: 1933, 1934, 1935, 1937 Big East: 1987, 1988, 2002, 2003, 2004, 2011

Conference division champions
- Big East West: 2002, 2003

Uniforms
Home	Away	Alternate

The Pittsburgh Panthers men's basketball team is the NCAA Division I intercollegiate men's basketball program of the University of Pittsburgh, often referred to as "Pitt", located in Pittsburgh, Pennsylvania. The Pitt men's basketball team competes in the Atlantic Coast Conference (ACC) and plays their home games in the Petersen Events Center. The Panthers were retroactively recognized as a pre-NCAA tournament national champion twice by the Helms Athletic Foundation and was ranked as the nation's top college team once by the Premo-Porretta Power Poll; however, neither designation is recognized by the NCAA as an official national championship, despite the NCAA referencing Helms's historical findings. Pitt has reached one Final Four, received 15 First Team All-American selections, appeared in 27 NCAA tournaments through the 2022–23 season, and has recorded 1,674 victories against 1,232 losses since their inaugural season of 1905–06.

== History ==
=== Initial era ===
The University of Pittsburgh began playing men's basketball in 1905–06 under coach Benjamin Printz. The university did not field a team during the 1909–10 and 1910–11 seasons. The program was resurrected in 1911 under head coach Walter "Dutch" Wohlfarth, and the following year Dr. George M. Flint assumed head coaching duties and began rebuilding Pitt's program essentially from the ground up. Flint led the Panthers to eight winning seasons during his ten years at the helm and coached future Pitt coach H. C. Carlson.

=== H.C. "Doc" Carlson era (1922–1953) ===
Henry Clifford "Doc" Carlson, MD took over as coach in 1922 and soon turned Pitt into a national power. In the era preceding the initiation of national tournaments, the Panthers were widely regarded as national champions in multiple seasons, a belief documented in contemporary sources like the 1929 University of Pittsburgh yearbook. The 1927–28 and 1929–30 teams were retroactively designated national champions by the Helms Athletic Foundation, and the 1927–28 team was also listed as the season's top team by the Premo-Porretta Power Poll. While the NCAA lists the historical Helms selections for reference, the Helms selections are not officially recognized as NCAA national championships, and the Premo-Porretta rankings are not acknowledged by the NCAA. Those teams were led by National Player of the Year, 3-time All-American and Naismith Basketball Hall of Fame inductee Charlie Hyatt. Carlson was a ground-breaking coach who would be inducted into the Naismith and Helms Foundation Basketball Hall of Fames. In the late 1920s, Carlson initiated playing a "national schedule" by taking his teams on midwestern road trips that included games against several Big Ten schools and, in 1931, is credited as the first coach to take an Eastern team out west. He also developed the widely emulated Figure Eight Offense and also experimented with various conditioning techniques, including the use of oxygen on the bench. Under Carlson, and led by two-time All-American Claire Cribbs, Pitt continued success through the 1930s winning four Eastern Intercollegiate Conference championships. In 1935, Pitt, as Eastern Intercollegiate champions representing the best of the East, lost a 41–37 season-ending contest to SEC champion LSU in the American Legion Bowl in Atlantic City, a game on which LSU bases its claim on that season's national championship. On February 28, 1940, Pitt played in the first-ever televised basketball game, a 57–37 victory over Fordham at Madison Square Garden that was televised by NBC station W2XBS. Carlson also led Pitt to its first-ever NCAA appearance en route to the 1941 NCAA Final Four. Carlson's tenure at Pitt's helm lasted for 30 consecutive years before he retired following the 1952–53 season.

Pitt moved their competition into the Fitzgerald Field House in 1951, leaving the Pitt Pavilion, housed inside of Pitt Stadium. Pitt would continue to play in the Fieldhouse until 2002.

=== Bob Timmons era (1953–1968) ===
Robert Timmons took over as head coach from Carlson for the 1953–54 season and led by two-time All-American and Helms Foundation Basketball Hall of Fame inductee Don Hennon, appeared in two NCAA tournaments during the late 1950s. Timmons also led Pitt to an NCAA appearance in 1963 and its first NIT appearance in 1964.

=== Buzz Ridl era (1968–1975) ===
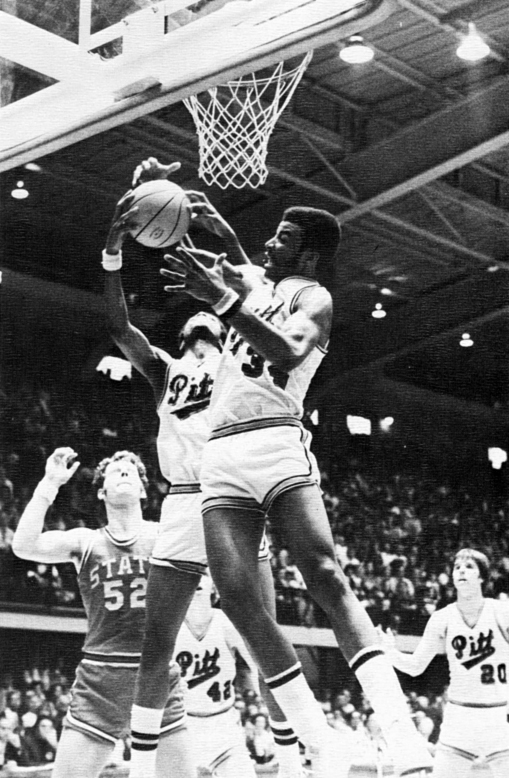
All-American Billy Knight (#34) goes for a rebound against NC State in the 1974 Elite Eight

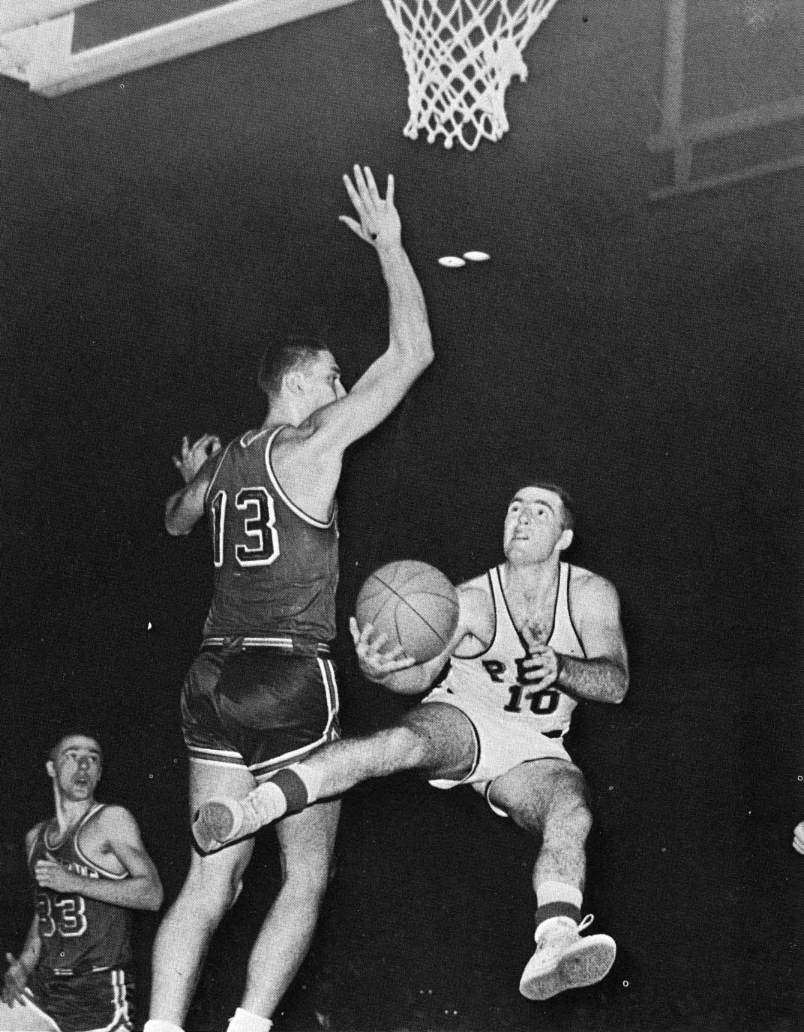
Pitt All-American Don Hennon drives around Duquesne University's Bob Slobodnik during a 71–56 Pitt victory in the Steel Bowl tournament on December 13, 1958

Timmons was succeeded by head coach Charles "Buzz" Ridl who became famous for his 'amoebe' defense, an ever changing man to zone match-up defense. With All-American Billy Knight, Ridl led Pitt to the Elite Eight in 1974, with early round victories over St. Joseph's and Furman. Pitt lost to eventual national champion North Carolina State in the Eastern Regional Final (Elite 8) played in Raleigh, North Carolina amid a hostile local crowd. This Pitt team was filled with local players such as Mickey Martin, Jim Bolla, Tom Richards, Keith Starr, Kirk Bruce and Billy Knight, who went on to star in the ABA for the Indiana Pacers and with several teams in the NBA. Following the graduation of Knight and Martin, Pitt made an NIT appearance the following year, Ridl's last before retiring.

=== Eastern Eight Conference (1976–1982) ===
For the 1976–77 season, Pitt began play as a member of the Eastern 8 Conference.

==== Tim Grgurich era (1975–1980) ====
Pittsburgh native Tim Grgurich, who was an assistant coach under Ridl, became Pitt's next head coach. He led Pitt into the inaugural 1976–77 season of the Eastern Collegiate Basketball League, which would change its name to the Eastern Eight (forerunner to the Atlantic 10) the following year. That initial year, Larry Harris, a 6'6" forward with an impressive outside shot and an ability to score points in traffic, won the league scoring title. Grgurich also led Pitt to the 1980 NIT.

==== Roy Chipman era (1980–1986) ====
Grgurich was succeeded by Lafayette coach Dr. Roy Chipman who began Pitt's rollercoaster-like ride back to national significance. In his first season at the helm, the Panthers won the Eastern Eight Conference tournament. In the 1981 NCAA tournament, Pitt defeated Idaho in overtime in the first round; they lost to North Carolina in the second round. Chipman's Panthers enjoyed similar success the following season, defeating archrival West Virginia for their last Eastern Eight tournament Championship, energized by remarks by WVU Coach Gale Catlett. Pitt lost to Pepperdine in the first round of the 1982 NCAA tournament to end Chipman's second season and Pitt's last as a member of the Eastern Eight Conference.

=== Big East Conference (1982–2013) ===
For the 1982–83 season, Pitt began play as a member of the Big East Conference.

==== Paul Evans era (1986–1994) ====
Chipman would lead Pitt to three more postseason appearances, he retired from coaching after the 86 season and was replaced by Paul Evans as head coach in 1986–87. Led by All-Americans Charles Smith and Jerome Lane, Pitt would capture its first two regular season Big East Championships and secure several top 10 rankings reaching as high as number two in the nation. However, compared to the expectations of the fans, these teams had disappointing showings in their Big East and NCAA tournaments appearances. After the departures of Smith and Lane, Pitt basketball continued to have a national, if not inconsistent, impact with players such as Sean Miller, Brian Shorter, Jerry McCullough, and Eric Mobley. In eight seasons as head coach Evans' teams advanced to a total of five NCAA tournaments and one NIT.

==== Ralph Willard era (1994–1999) ====
Slumping play led to Evans' departure, and he was replaced by Ralph Willard who headed the Pitt program from 1994–95 through 1998–99. Despite highly regarded recruiting classes and stars such as Mark Blount and Vonteego Cummings, Pitt advanced to only one NIT in five seasons under Willard.

==== Ben Howland era (1999–2003) ====
Ben Howland was hired as head coach of the Panthers in 1999–00 and led them to sustained success for 4 seasons. In Howland's second season (2000–01), the Pitt team, led by senior standout Ricardo Greer and All-American guard Brandin Knight, advanced to the Big East tournament championship game and NIT. In Howland's third (2001–02) and fourth (2002–03) seasons, Pitt won back-to-back Big East regular season championships, appeared in back-to-back Big East tournament championship games and won the Big East tournament in 2003. Pitt advanced to consecutive NCAA tournament Sweet Sixteens (2002, 2003). For his success in the 2001–02 season, Howland was named the Big East Coach of the Year, Naismith College Coach of the Year, and won the Henry Iba Award as best college basketball coach as named by the United States Basketball Writers Association. Following the 2003 season, Howland left Pitt for the only job he said he would ever contemplate leaving Pitt for: the head coach position at UCLA.

In 2002, Pitt began their first season of play at the 12,508-seat Petersen Events Center which sits on the former site of Pitt Stadium. The first opponent at "the Pete", as the facility is called by students, was against cross-city rival Duquesne University.

=== Atlantic Coast Conference (2013–present) ===
For the 2013–14 season, Pitt began play as a member of the ACC.

==== Jamie Dixon era (2003–2016) ====
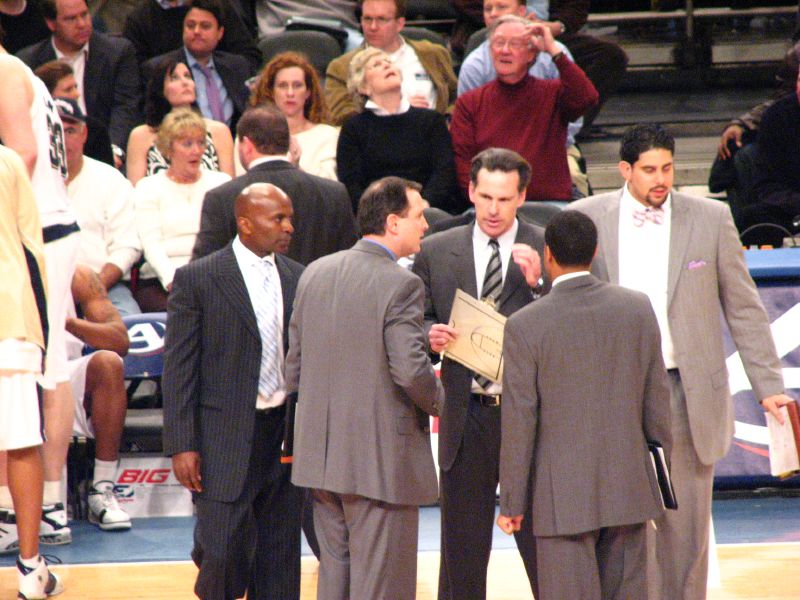
Head coach Jamie Dixon (clipboard) huddles with his coaching staff in 2007

Jamie Dixon, Howland's assistant at Northern Arizona and Pitt, was named head coach of the team in 2003. Under Dixon, the Panthers continued the progress begun under Howland, registering a third straight Big East regular season championship (2004), a fourth straight appearance in the Big East tournament championship game (Pitt 58, UConn 61) and a third straight appearance in the NCAA tournament Sweet Sixteen. With Dixon at the helm, Pitt's success continued with frequent national rankings, four Big East tournament championship game appearances in five seasons (2004, 2006, 2007 2008), a Big East tournament Championship in 2008, and NCAA tournament appearances in nine of ten years under Dixon's leadership (2004–11, 2013), including trips to the Sweet Sixteen (2004, 2007, 2009) and Elite Eight (2009).

The 2008–09 season was notable for several historic accomplishments. The Panthers were ranked #1 in the Associated Press poll and ESPN/USA Today Coaches' poll for the first time in school history, claiming the #1 spot for a total of three weeks. On February 16, 2009, the #4 ranked Panthers defeated the #1 ranked UConn Huskies, 76–68, for Pitt's first-ever win versus a #1 ranked team. The Panthers repeated the feat on March 7, 2009, when the #3 ranked Panthers again defeated #1 ranked UConn again, 70–60, for Pitt's second-ever win versus a #1 ranked team. In doing so, Pitt became only the seventh school in NCAA Division I history to defeat two #1 ranked teams in the same season. On Selection Sunday, March 15, 2009, the Panthers received their first ever No.1 seed (East Region) in the 2009 NCAA tournament. They reached the Elite Eight for the first time since 1974. Pitt's 78–76 last second loss to fellow Big East Conference foe Villanova in the East Regional final for a trip to the Final Four became an instant classic. In 2009, Dixon broke the record for the most victories in the first six seasons as a Division I head coach and won the Naismith Coach of the Year award.

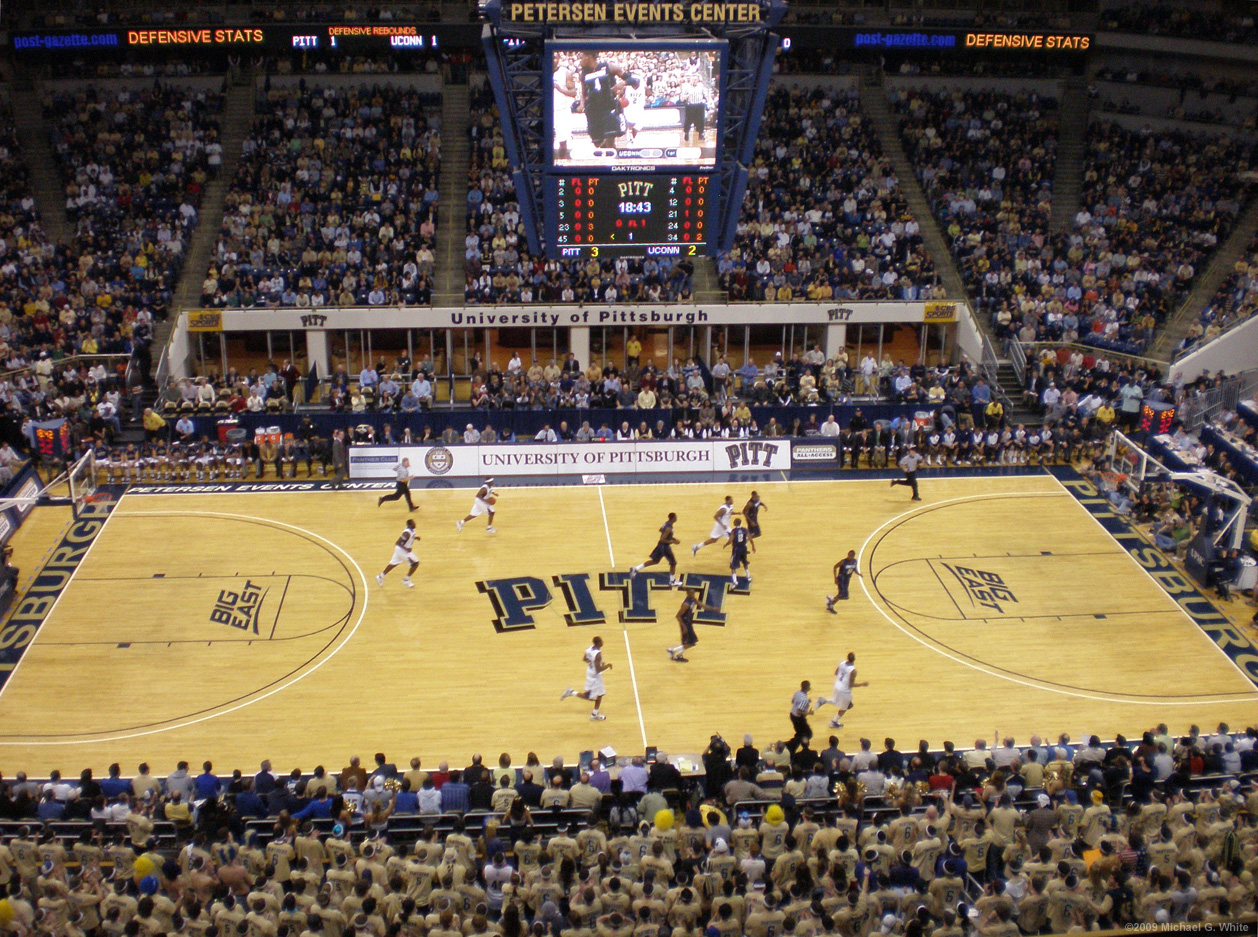
The early minutes of a game against number one ranked UConn in 2009 at the Petersen Events Center. A portion of the Oakland Zoo can be seen at the bottom. Pitt won the nationally televised game 70–60.

The success of the 2008–09 season continued over to the 2009–10 season, somewhat unexpectedly. Having lost the talents of Sam Young, DeJuan Blair and Levance Fields, the Panthers were picked in a pre-season Big East poll to finish ninth in the conference. Instead, Pitt earned a 13–5 Big East record, good enough for a second seed in the Big East tournament, received a third seed in the NCAA tournament, and finished 25–9 overall record. In 2010–11, Pitt won the regular season Big East title and, for a second time in the program's history, earned a #1 seed in the NCAA tournament.

The program achieved a school record 10-straight seasons with at least 20 overall wins, 10 conference wins, and an NCAA Tournament appearance from 2002 through 2011. Dixon, who has been named as a national coach of the year in three separate seasons, guided Pitt to NCAA Tournament appearances in his first eight seasons as head coach, and is the only head coach in school history to guide Pitt to eight NCAA Tournament appearances (2004–2011).

The Atlantic Coast Conference announced in September 2011 that Pitt and Syracuse would be leaving the Big East and had been accepted as members of the ACC, which would grow from 12 to 14 teams. Pitt officially joined the ACC on July 1, 2013.

In 2011–12, Pitt failed to qualify for the NCAA tournament, but managed to again surpass 20 wins for the 11th consecutive season and qualify for the College Basketball Invitational for a 12th consecutive post-season appearance. Pitt defeated Washington State in the Finals in a best 2 out of 3 format to win the post-season tournament.

Dixon's record at Pitt stood at 262 wins and 86 losses (.753 win percentage) in ten seasons (2003–04 through 2012–13), second in school history behind only Carlson. His league record of 127–66 in ten seasons made him the winningest coach in Big East history with a .658 winning percentage in league games and tournaments.

On March 31, 2010, Pitt extended Dixon's contract by two years, making him Pitt's head coach through 2017–18 season. Dixon signed another contract extension on March 23, 2013. This extension ran through the 2022–2023 season. Upon the extension, Dixon commented saying that his intentions were to "finish his career at the University of Pittsburgh." Dixon, however, departed to take the head coaching position at his alma mater, TCU, on March 21, 2016, after Pitt grew dissatisfied with his team's results and lowered his contract buyout clause to make it easier for him to leave.

==== Kevin Stallings era (2016–2018) ====
On March 28, 2016, the school hired Vanderbilt head coach Kevin Stallings to fill the vacant head coaching position. Pitt went 16–17 and finished 14th in the ACC, its first losing season in 17 years. The Panthers notably lost to Duquesne for the first time since 2000 and suffered a 106–51 loss to Louisville, their worst loss since 1906. The disappointing season was punctuated by a blowout home loss to #1 Virginia on senior night, during which the Panthers managed only 7 first half points against the Cavaliers. In Stallings's second season, Pitt went 8–24 and went 0–18 in ACC conference play. Pitt finished 15th, last in the conference. The season's 19-game losing streak was the worst in Pitt history. Further, this was the only season in Pitt's history where they were winless in conference play. On March 8, 2018, Pitt fired Stallings.

==== Jeff Capel era (2018–present) ====
On March 27, 2018, Duke associate head coach Jeff Capel reached an agreement to become the 16th head basketball coach at Pitt. Capel previously served as head coach at VCU (2002–06) and Oklahoma (2006–11). In the 2022–23 season, the Panthers finished with a regular season record of 21–10 and made the NCAA Tournament for the first time in six years. The 11-seed Panthers defeated Mississippi State 60–59 in the First Four and 6-seed Iowa State 59–41 in the first round before suffering a loss to 3-seed Xavier by a score of 84–73.

== Traditions ==
=== Student section ===
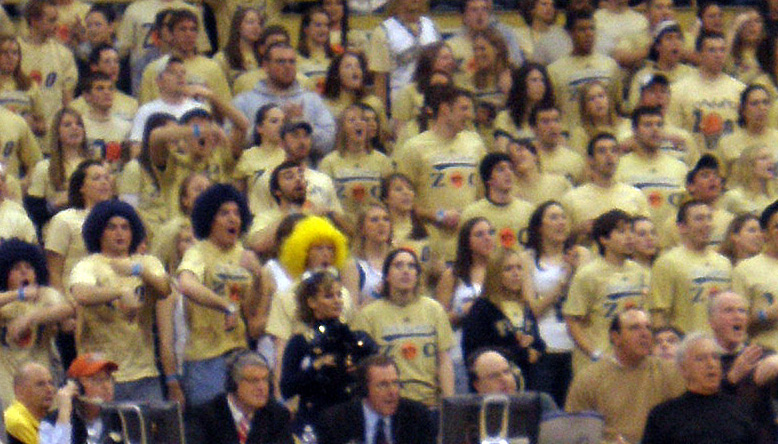
The Oakland Zoo Pitt student cheering section at the Petersen Events Center

The "Oakland Zoo" is the student cheering section for the men's and women's basketball teams. The Zoo cheers on the Panthers from the bottom tier of the stands at the Petersen Events Center, primarily across from the teams' benches and on the baselines under the baskets. The "Pete" holds a rowdy crowd of 1,500 students that are typically uniformly clad in gold t-shirts, and the Zoo student section is consistently sold out for Panthers home games. The Oakland Zoo is named after Oakland, the neighborhood in which the university is located. The name "Oakland Zoo" is used for the basketball cheering sections only; the football cheering section has often used the title, "The Panther Pitt."

=== Rivalries ===
==== West Virginia ====
The fiercest rivalry was with former Big East Conference member West Virginia University in the basketball version of the Backyard Brawl, an extension of the football rivalry. Adding to the importance of the game, Pitt and West Virginia shared membership in the Eastern Intercollegiate Conference (1933–1939), the Eastern Collegiate Basketball League West Division (1977), Eastern 8 Conference (1978–1982), and the Big East Conference (1996–2012). In addition, the two rivals have tangled in the last games played at three of their respective arenas: on February 26, 1951, Pitt defeated WVU 74–72 in the closing seconds of the last college game played at the Pitt Pavilion inside Pitt Stadium; on March 3, 1970, Pitt upset WVU 92–87 in the last game played at the West Virginia University Field House in Morgantown; and on March 2, 2002, Pitt defeated WVU 92–65 in Pitt's last game at Fitzgerald Field House. The two teams met in conference play for the last time on February 16, 2012, resulting in a 66–48 Mountaineer victory.

After five seasons without playing, the schools resumed their series in 2017 with a 69–60 win by the Mountaineers. They have since met in out-of-conference play every year since as of 2024. As of 2024, the school have met 193 times, with West Virginia leading the series 103–90. Pitt's 193 games against the Mountaineers are its most against any opponent.

==== Penn State ====
Another spill-over from the gridiron, the Panthers' third-most frequently-played opponent is the Penn State Nittany Lions, whom they have played 150 times. Penn State leads the all-time series, 76–74. They played at least once every year from 1935 to 1982 and briefly rekindled the rivalry at the turn of the century, playing annually from 2000 to 2005. Since that time, they've gone against each other just four times, in 2013 as part of the Big Ten-ACC Challenge, in the 2016 Never Forget Tribute Classic, in 2025 at a neutral site game at the Giant Center, and in 2026 at The Palestra. They are not scheduled to renew the series in the foreseeable future, though there have been significant talks between the universities about doing so.

==== Duquesne ====
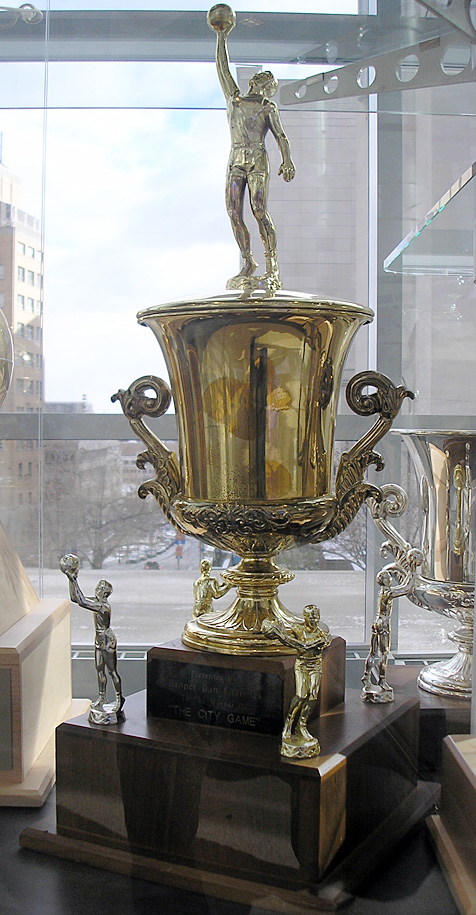
The City Game trophy on display in the Petersen Events Center

The Panthers also have a sustained rivalry with crosstown opponent Duquesne University in The City Game. Peaking in ferocity from 1977 to 1982 when both were members of the Eastern Eight Conference, the rivalry has diminished somewhat since Pitt's move to the Big East Conference in 1982.

==== Syracuse ====
A spillover from their football rivalry, the Panthers and Syracuse University also maintain a rivalry on the hardwood. The series intensified during the first decade of this century, during which both teams were highly competitive in the Big East and made numerous appearances in both the AP Top 10 and NCAA Tournament. They continue to play at least twice each season as members of the ACC.

=== Pre-NCAA Tournament Honors and Claims ===
The Pitt men's basketball teams of 1927–28 (21–0) and 1929–30 (23–2) were retroactively designated by the Helms Athletic Foundation as national champions for the pre-NCAA Tournament era. The Helms titles are not officially recognized as NCAA national championships, but the university hangs banners in the Petersen Events Center honoring the Helms designations. In addition, the 1927–28 team was retroactively listed by the Premo-Porretta Power Poll as the top team of the season. The program's dominance in this period was also noted contemporaneously by sources like the university yearbook.

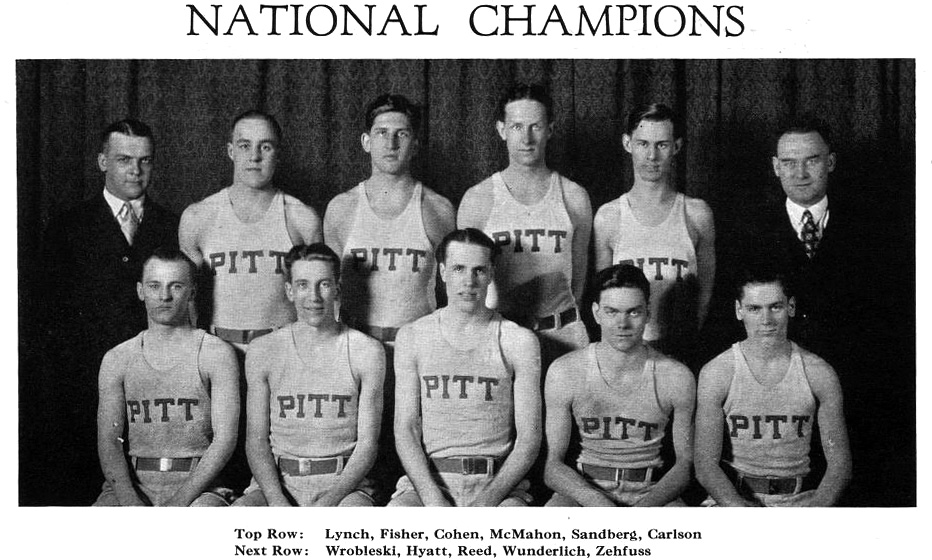
The 1927–28 Pitt team, retroactively designated a national champion by Helms.

These teams of "Doc" Carlson, led by three-time All-American and two-time National Scoring Champion Charley Hyatt, played a "national" schedule that during the 1927–28 season that included the following wins:

- @ Michigan
- @ Chicago
- @ Northwestern
- @ Iowa
- Ohio State
- Dartmouth (defending Eastern Collegiate Champions)
- Syracuse
- @ Army
- @ Colgate
- Notre Dame
- @ West Virginia
- @ Penn State

The 1929–30 national championship team earned wins that included the following:

- @ Indiana
- @ Northwestern
- @ Iowa
- Ohio State
- Nebraska
- Georgetown
- @ Montana State (defending national champions)
- Notre Dame
- Fordham
- @ Penn State
- West Virginia
- @ Temple
- @ Army

Although there was no NCAA Tournament at that time, there were contests billed as "National Championship Games". The 1930 game in particular helped Pittsburgh legend Charley Hyatt cement his place in history by scoring 27 points, including a last second game-winning shot, at the defending national champions and assumed #1 squad Montana State.

=== Early-season national tournaments ===
Starting with the NCAA rule change regarding exempt tournaments in the 2006–07 season, Pitt has participated in an event every year, with the exception of 2020 due to the COVID-19 pandemic.

Year	Event	Location	Record	Result
2006	First Commonwealth Colonial Athletic Association Classic	Petersen Events Center	4–0	Champion
2007	Hispanic College Fund Challenge	Petersen Events Center	4–0	Champion
2008	Legends Classic	Petersen Events Center; Prudential Center	2–0; 2–0	Champion
2009	O'Reilly Auto Parts CBE Classic	Petersen Events Center; Sprint Center	2–0; 1–1	Runner-up
2010	2K Sports Classic Benefiting Coaches vs Cancer	Petersen Events Center; Madison Square Garden	2–0; 2–0	Champion
2011	Philly Hoop Group Classic	Petersen Events Center; Palestra	3–0; 1–0	Champion
2012	NIT Season Tip-Off	Petersen Events Center; Madison Square Garden	2–0; 1–1	3rd Place
2013	Legends Classic	Petersen Events Center; Barclays Center	2–0; 2–0	Champion
2014	Maui Invitational tournament	Petersen Events Center; Lahaina Civic Center	2–0; 1–1	3rd Place
2015	Gotham Classic	Petersen Events Center; Madison Square Garden	3–0; 1–0	Champion
2016	2K Sports Classic	Petersen Events Center; Madison Square Garden	2–0; 1–1	3rd Place
2017	Legends Classic	Petersen Events Center; Barclays Center	1–1; 0–2	4th Place
2018	Barclays Classic	Petersen Events Center; Barclays Center	3–0; 1–0	Champion
2019	Fort Myers Tip-Off	Petersen Events Center; Suncoast Credit Union Arena	2–0; 2–0	Champion
2020	None			
2021	Gotham Classic	Petersen Events Center; Madison Square Garden	1–1; 1–0	3rd Place
2022	Legends Classic	Barclays Center	0–2	4th Place
2023	NIT Season Tip-Off	Barclays Center	1–1	3rd Place
2024	Greenbrier Tip-Off	Colonial Hall	2–1	2nd Place
2025	Legends Classic	Ocean Center	0–2	4th Place

== Postseason ==
=== NCAA tournament results ===
The Panthers have appeared in the NCAA tournament 27 times. Their combined record is 25–28.

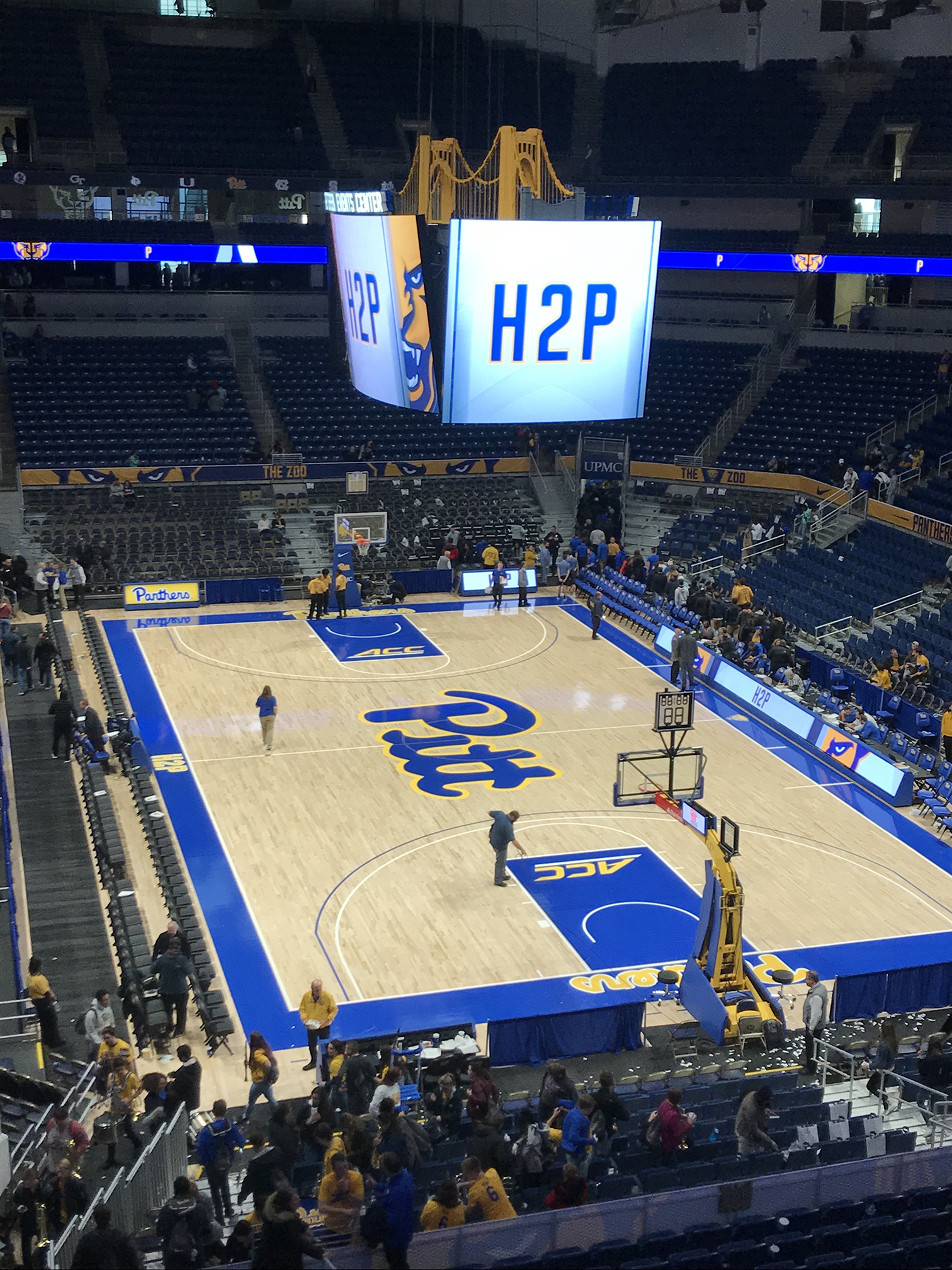
The Petersen Events Center in November 2019

Year	Seed	Round	Opponent	Result
1941		Elite Eight; Final Four	North Carolina; Wisconsin	W 26–20; L 30–36
1957		First Round; Sweet Sixteen; Regional 3rd Place Game	Morehead State; Kentucky; Notre Dame	W 86–85; L 92–98; L 85–86
1958		First Round	Miami (OH)	L 77–82
1963		First Round	NYU	L 83–93
1974		First Round; Sweet Sixteen; Elite Eight	Saint Joseph's; Furman; NC State	W 54–42; W 81–78; L 72–100
1981	#10	First Round; Second Round	#7 Idaho #2 North Carolina	W 70–69^{OT} L 57–74
1982	#7	First Round	#10 Pepperdine	L 88–99
1985	#12	First Round	#5 Louisiana Tech	L 54–78
1987	#3	First Round; Second Round	#14 Marist #6 Oklahoma	W 93–68; L 93–96
1988	#2	First Round; Second Round	#15 Eastern Michigan #7 Vanderbilt	W 108–90; L 74–80^{OT}
1989	#8	First Round	#9 Ball State	L 64–68
1991	#6	First Round; Second Round	#11 Georgia #3 Kansas	W 75–68^{OT} L 66–77
1993	#9	First Round	#8 Utah	L 65–86
2002	#3	First Round; Second Round; Sweet Sixteen	#14 Central Connecticut #6 California #10 Kent State	W 71–54; W 63–50; L 73–78^{OT}
2003	#2	First Round; Second Round; Sweet Sixteen	#15 Wagner #7 Indiana #3 Marquette	W 87–61; W 74–52; L 74–77
2004	#3	First Round; Second Round; Sweet Sixteen	#14 UCF #6 Wisconsin #2 Oklahoma State	W 53–44; W 59–55; L 51–63
2005	#9	First Round	#8 Pacific	L 71–79
2006	#5	First Round; Second Round	#12 Kent State #13 Bradley	W 79–64; L 66–72
2007	#3	First Round; Second Round; Sweet Sixteen	#14 Wright State #11 VCU #2 UCLA	W 79–58; W 84–79^{OT} L 55–64
2008	#4	First Round; Second Round	#13 Oral Roberts #5 Michigan State	W 82–63; L 54–65
2009	#1	First Round; Second Round; Sweet Sixteen; Elite Eight	#16 East Tennessee State #8 Oklahoma State #4 Xavier #3 Villanova	W 72–62; W 84–76; W 60–55; L 76–78
2010	#3	First Round; Second Round	#14 Oakland #6 Xavier	W 89–66; L 68–71
2011	#1	Second Round; Third Round	#16 UNC Asheville #8 Butler	W 74–51; L 70–71
2013	#8	Second Round	#9 Wichita State	L 55–73
2014	#9	Second Round; Third Round	#8 Colorado #1 Florida	W 77–48; L 45–61
2016	#10	First Round	#7 Wisconsin	L 43–47
2023	#11	First Four; First Round; Second Round	#11 Mississippi State #6 Iowa State #3 Xavier	W 60–59; W 59–41; L 73–84

NCAA Tournament Seeding History
The NCAA began seeding the tournament with the 1979 edition.

Years →	'81	'82	'85	'87	'88	'89	'91	'93	'02	'03	'04	'05	'06	'07	'08	'09	'10	'11	'13	'14	'16	'23
Seeds→	10	10	12	3	2	8	6	9	3	2	3	9	5	3	4	1	3	1	8	9	10	11

=== NIT results ===
The Panthers have appeared in the National Invitation Tournament (NIT) nine times. Their combined record is 6–9.

Year	Round	Opponent	Result
1964	First Round	Drake	L 82–87
1975	First Round; Quarterfinals	Southern Illinois; Providence	W 70–65; L 80–101
1980	First Round	Duquesne	L 63–65
1984	First Round; Second Round; Quarterfinals	La Salle; Florida State; Notre Dame	W 95–91; W 66–63; L 64–72
1986	First Round	SW Missouri State	L 52–59
1992	First Round; Second Round	Penn State; Florida	W 67–65; L 74–77
1997	First Round; Second Round	New Orleans; Arkansas	W 82–63; L 71–76
2001	First Round; Second Round	St. Bonaventure; Mississippi State	W 84–75; L 61–66
2015	First Round	George Washington	L 54–60

=== CBI results ===
The Panthers have appeared in the College Basketball Invitational (CBI) one time. Their record is 5–1 and they were CBI champions in 2012.

Year	Round	Opponent	Result
2012	First Round; Quarterfinals; Semifinals; Finals Game 1 Finals Game 2 Finals Game 3	Wofford; Princeton; Butler; Washington State; Washington State; Washington State	W 81–63; W 82–61; W 68–62^{OT} L 66–67; W 57–53; W 71–65

== Conference Championships ==
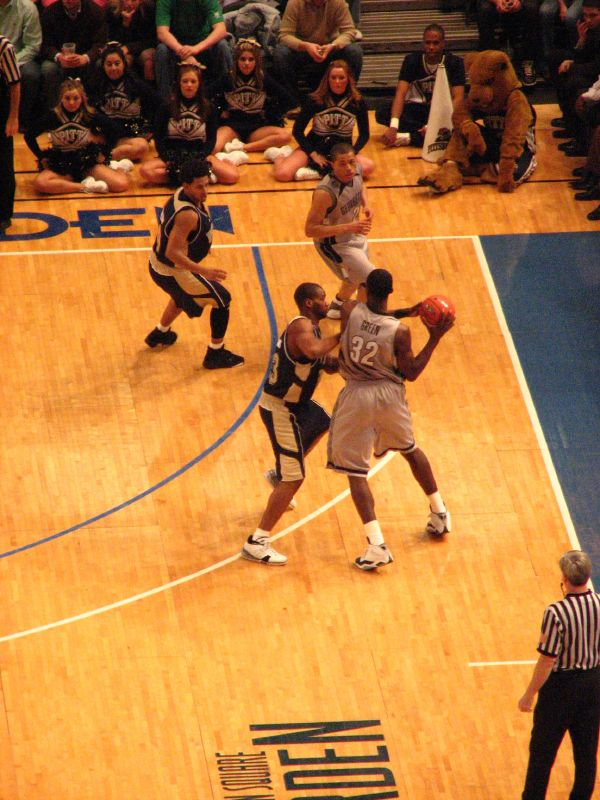
Pitt advanced to the Big East tournament Championship Game in 7 of 8 seasons between 2001 and 2008

1932–33 Eastern Intercollegiate Champions
1933–34 Eastern Intercollegiate Champions
1934–35 Eastern Intercollegiate Champions
1936–37 Eastern Intercollegiate Champions
1980–81 Eastern 8 Tournament Champions
1981–82 Eastern 8 Tournament Champions
1986–87 Big East Regular Season Co-Champions
1987–88 Big East Regular Season Champions
2001–02 Big East Regular Season West Champions
2002–03 Big East tournament and Regular Season West Co-Champions
2003–04 Big East Regular Season Champions
2007–08 Big East tournament champions
2010–11 Big East Regular Season Champions

Pitt was the only team in Big East Conference history to reach the Big East Championship Game seven times in eight seasons having earned a trip to the title game in 2001, 2002, 2003, 2004, 2006, 2007, and 2008. Pitt played in the Eastern 8 Tournament Championship games in 1979, 1981, and 1982.

== Individual awards & honors ==
=== National honors ===
==== National Player of the Year ====
Charley Hyatt won the National Player of the Year in 1929–30, he was the America's leading scorer that season (his second time as leading scorer) and made a last second basket to win the National Title Game with 27 points against what many considered the best team in the country. This season was also to be the third consecutive time he had earned consensus All-American status (the second time he won the honor owing to him being in the inaugural class of consensus in his second season).

==== National Coach of the Year ====
- 2001–02: Ben Howland won National Coach of the Year honors from the Associated Press, Naismith, USBWA, ESPN The Magazine, and The Sporting News.
- 2008–09: Jamie Dixon won the Naismith Men's College Basketball Coach of the Year as well as the Jim Phelan Mid-season Coach of the Year award.
- 2009–10: Jamie Dixon won the Jim Phelan National Coach of the Year Award.
- 2010–11: Jamie Dixon won the Sporting News National Coach of the Year award.

==== Hall of Fame inductees ====
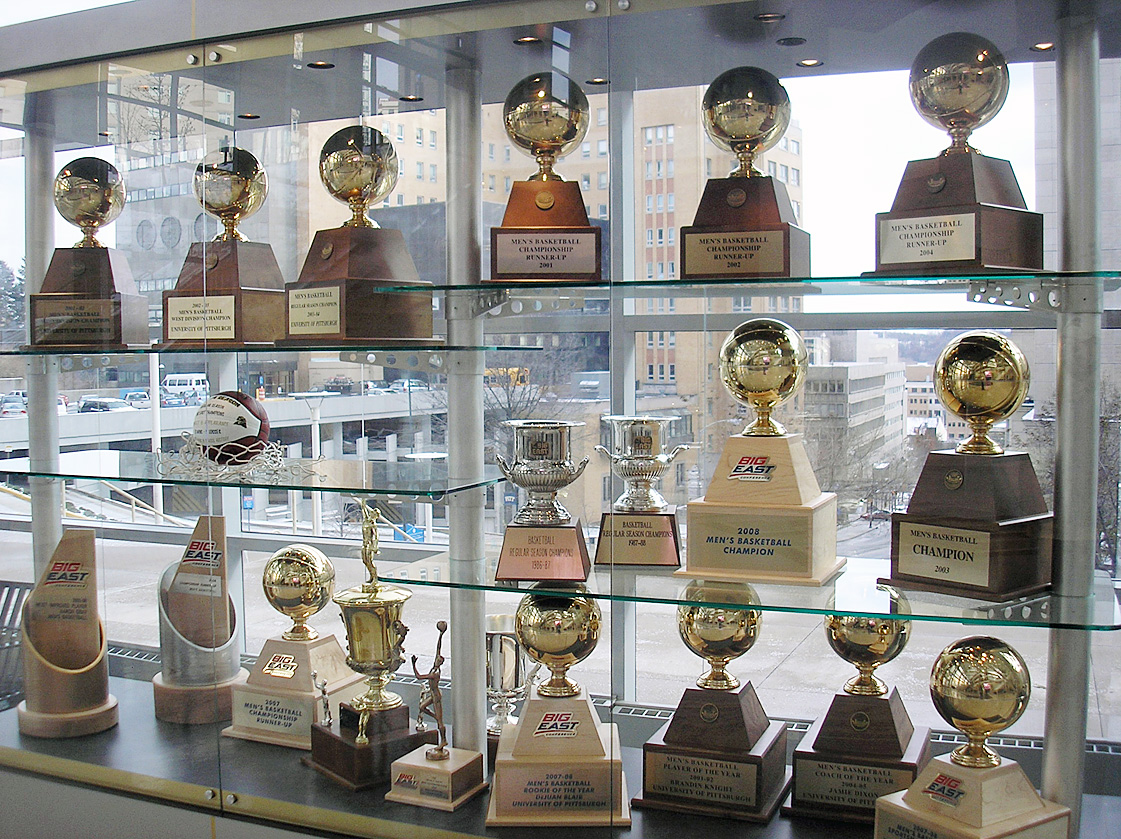
Men's basketball trophy case as seen in the lobby of the Petersen Events Center in 2008

Three inductees represent the University of Pittsburgh in the Helms Foundation Basketball Hall of Fame; two of them, Carlson and Hyatt, are also represented in the Naismith Basketball Hall of Fame and the National Collegiate Basketball Hall of Fame. Both Carlson and Hyatt were selected as the first class inducted to each hall.

- Henry Clifford "Doc" Carlson, M.D., Pitt head coach from 1922 to 1953. He is noted as the innovator of the "figure 8" play, the first coach to take his team cross country and a leading advocate for intersectional games. Despite great modern eras in Pitt basketball (late 1950s, mid 1970s, 1980s, 2000s), he continues to be the winningest coach in program history as well as the only one to lead the program to unofficial national championship recognition.
- Charley Hyatt, Pitt player and three-time All-American and two-time national scoring leader, he also was a senior year All American in High School and earned three other all-pro awards in the pre-NBA era playing after Pitt. He was a member of the very first Consensus All American team in 1929.
- Don Hennon, two-time All-American (with one being a Consensus All American), led Pitt to two NCAA Tournament bids.

==== All Americans ====
Thirteen Pitt players have received All-American honors 14 unique season. Pitt players have been named First Team^{†} All-Americans 15 times, Second Team All-Americans seven times, and Third Team All-Americans six times. In addition, players have been named as Freshman All-Americans four times and Honorable Mention All-Americans six times. A Pitt player has achieved Consensus First Team All-American, as listed in the Official NCAA Records Book, on nine occasions. Charley Hyatt and Sykes Reed, who together lead Pitt to an undefeated season, were Pitt's first Consensus All-Americans in 1928. The other consensus first-team All-Americans include Don Smith, Claire Cribbs, Don Hennon, and DeJuan Blair. In addition, Don Hennon, Billy Knight and Jerome Lane received Consensus Second Team All-American status.

All-American Selections

First Team^{†}
Year	Name	Selectors
1928	Charley Hyatt*	Helms
1928	Sykes Reed*	Helms
1929	Charley Hyatt*	Helms
1930	Charley Hyatt*	Helms
1933	Don Smith*	Helms
1934	Claire Cribbs*	Helms
1935	Claire Cribbs*	Helms
1958	Don Hennon*	AP, UPI, USBWA, Helms
1959	Don Hennon	UPI, Helms
1974	Billy Knight	USBWA
1987	Charles Smith	Wooden
1988	Charles Smith	SH, Wooden
2003	Brandin Knight	Wooden
2009	DeJuan Blair*	AP, USBWA, TSN, SI, Wooden, ESPN.com
2009	Sam Young	Wooden

Second Team
Year	Name	Selectors
1958	Don Hennon	NABC
1959	Don Hennon*	AP, NABC
1974	Billy Knight*	AP, NABC
1988	Jerome Lane*	AP, USBWA
1988	Charles Smith	NABC
2002	Brandin Knight	TSN
2009	DeJuan Blair	NABC
2009	Sam Young	SI

Third Team
Year	Name	Selectors
1974	Billy Knight	UPI
1987	Jerome Lane	AP, UPI, NABC
2002	Brandin Knight	AP
2007	Aaron Gray	AP, NABC
2009	Sam Young	AP, TSN
2009	Levance Fields	SI

^{†}Helms and Wooden select one team of 10 players. *Consensus status for that team. Ref:

Honorable Mention All-Americans

1979 Sam Clancy, AP
1988 Charles Smith, AP, UPI
2003 Brandin Knight, AP
2004 Carl Krauser, AP

2008 Sam Young, AP
2009 Levance Fields, AP
2011 Ashton Gibbs, AP & Brad Wanamaker, AP

Freshman All-Americans

1978 Sam Clancy, Second Team
1985 Charles Smith, First Team
2004 Chris Taft, Second Team
2008 DeJuan Blair (consensus pick, but not for a particular team)

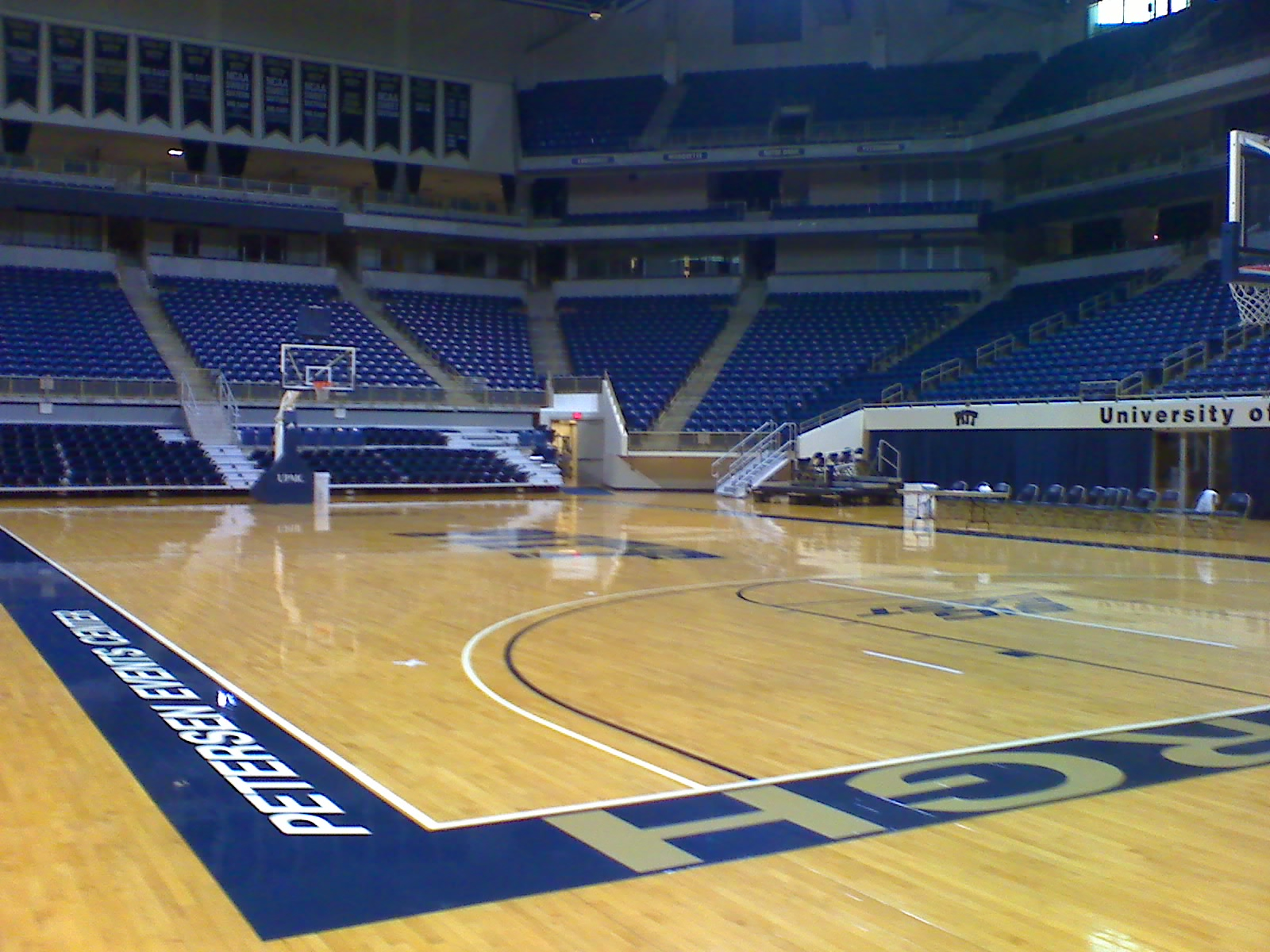
The floor of the Petersen Events Center. Some of Pitt's championship banners can be seen hanging in the top left of the photo.

==== Academic awards ====
Two Pitt players have earned Academic All-American status from the College Sports Information Directors of America. Three Pitt players have earned the NCAA Postgraduate Scholarships which are awarded annually to select student-athletes who excel academically and athletically and who are in their final year of intercollegiate athletics competition.

===== Academic All-Americans =====
- Peter Strickland, 1978
- Joey David, 1986

===== NCAA Postgraduate scholarship winners =====
- Thomas Richards, 1976
- Joseph David, 1986
- Darren Morningstar, 1992

===== Other awards =====
- Orlando Antigua was selected as the USBWA Most Courageous Athlete in 1994.

=== Conference honors ===
==== Player of the Year ====
- Charles Smith, 1987–88
- Brandin Knight (co), 2001–02
- DeJuan Blair (co), 2008–09

==== Most Improved Player ====
- Ricardo Greer (co), 1999–00
- Brandin Knight, 2001–02
- Carl Krauser, 2003–04
- Aaron Gray, 2005–06
- Sam Young, 2007–08
- Ashton Gibbs, 2009–10

==== Scholar-Athlete of the Year ====
- Joe David, 1984–85
- Darren Morningstar, 1991–92
- Aaron Gray, 2006–07
- Cameron Wright, 2013–14

==== Sportsmanship Award ====
- Jaron Brown, 2003–04
- Ronald Ramon (co), 2007–08
- Brad Wanamaker, 2010–11

==== Coach of the Year ====
- Ben Howland, 2001–02
- Jamie Dixon, 2003–04
- Jeff Capel, 2022–23

==== Rookie of the Year ====
- Charles Smith, 1984–85
- Sean Miller, 1987–88
- Brian Shorter, 1988–89
- Chris Taft, 2003–04
- DeJuan Blair (co), 2007–08

==== Sixth Man of the Year ====
- Nike Sibande, 2022–23
- Ishmael Leggett, 2023–24

==== Tournament MVP ====
- Lennie McMillian, Eastern 8 1981
- Clyde Vaughan, Eastern 8 1982
- Julius Page, Big East 2003
- Sam Young, Big East 2008

=== Conference stat champions ===
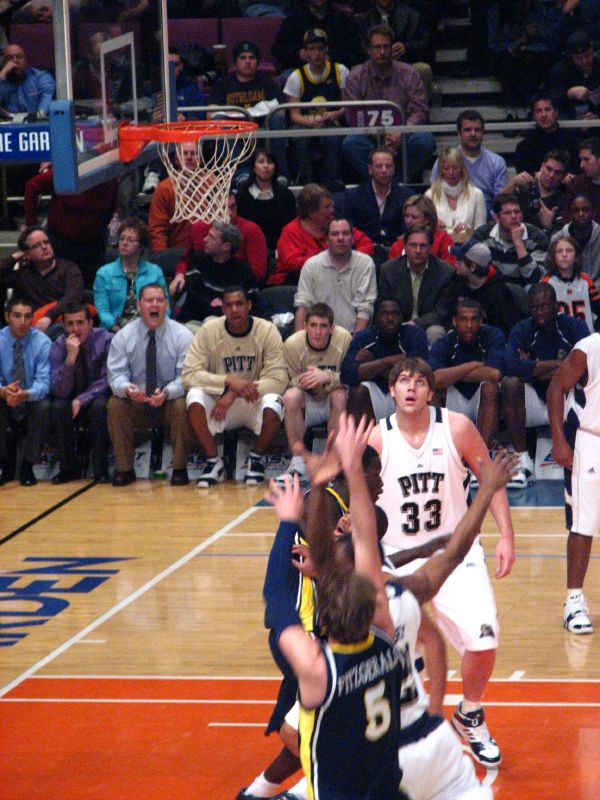
Aaron Gray (#33) won the Big East Rebounding Title in 2005 and is one of six Panthers to earn the Big East's Most Improved Player award since 2000

==== Scoring ====
- Larry Harris won the Eastern 8 Scoring Title in the 1976–77 season (22.9 ppg).
- Clyde Vaughan won the Big East Scoring Title in the 1982–83 season (22.0 ppg).

==== Rebounding ====
- Sam Clancy won the Eastern 8 Rebounding Titles in both the 1978–79 (12.8 rpg) and 1979–80 (11.1 rpg) seasons.
- Jerome Lane won the Big East Rebounding Titles in both the 1986–87 (14.0 rpg) and 1987–88 (11.6 rpg) seasons.
- Isaac Hawkins won the Big East Rebounding Title in the 1997–98 season (9.7 rpg).
- Aaron Gray won the Big East Rebounding Title in the 2005–06 season (10.5 rpg).
- DeJuan Blair won the Big East Rebounding Title in the 2008–09 season (12.4 rpg).

==== Assist ====
- Dwayne Wallace won the Eastern 8 Assist Title in the 1981–82 season (6.2 apg).
- Darelle Porter won the Big East Assist Title in the 1989–90 season (7.6 apg).
- Levance Fields won the Big East Assist Title in the 2008–09 season (7.5 apg).

=== University honors ===
==== Retired numbers ====
Four players have had their jersey numbers retired at Pitt.

No.	Player	Pos.	Years	No. Ret.	Ref.
10	Don Hennon	PG	1956–1959	1968	
20	Brandin Knight	PG	1999–2003	March 4, 2009	
32	Charles Smith	PF	1984–1988	March 2, 1988	
34	Billy Knight	SG	1971–1974	February 10, 1989	

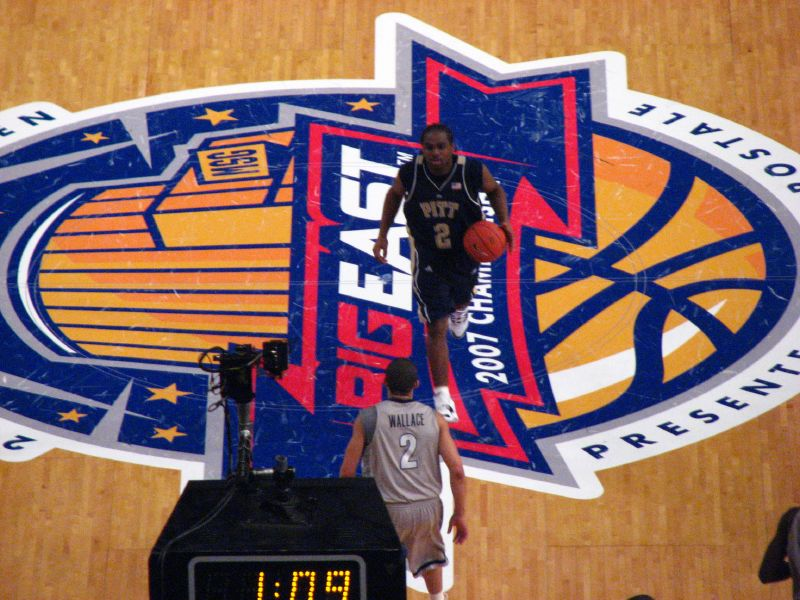
Levance Fields totaled 1,247 points and 645 assists during his career

==== Points club ====
41 total Panther players have achieved the 1,000 points club. Of these, fourteen total Panther players have scored over 1,500 points in their career. Two of these Panther players, Charles Smith and Clyde Vaughan, scored over 2,000 points in their career.

Stats updated through February 5, 2014.

===== 2,000+ points =====
- Charles Smith (1984–1988) 2,045
- Clyde Vaughan (1980–1984) 2,033

===== 1,500+ points =====
- Larry Harris (1974–1978) 1,914
- Sam Young (2005–2009) 1,884
- Don Hennon (1956–1959) 1,841
- Jason Matthews (1987–1991) 1,840
- Ricardo Greer (1997–2001) 1,753
- Ashton Gibbs (2008–2012) 1,748
- Billy Knight (1971–1974) 1,731
- Sam Clancy (1977–1981) 1,671
- Carl Krauser (2002–2006) 1,642
- Brian Shorter (1988–1991) 1,633
- Vonteego Cummings (1996–1999) 1,581
- Demetreus Gore (1984–1988) 1,555
- Julius Page (2000–2004) 1,512

===== 1,000+ points =====
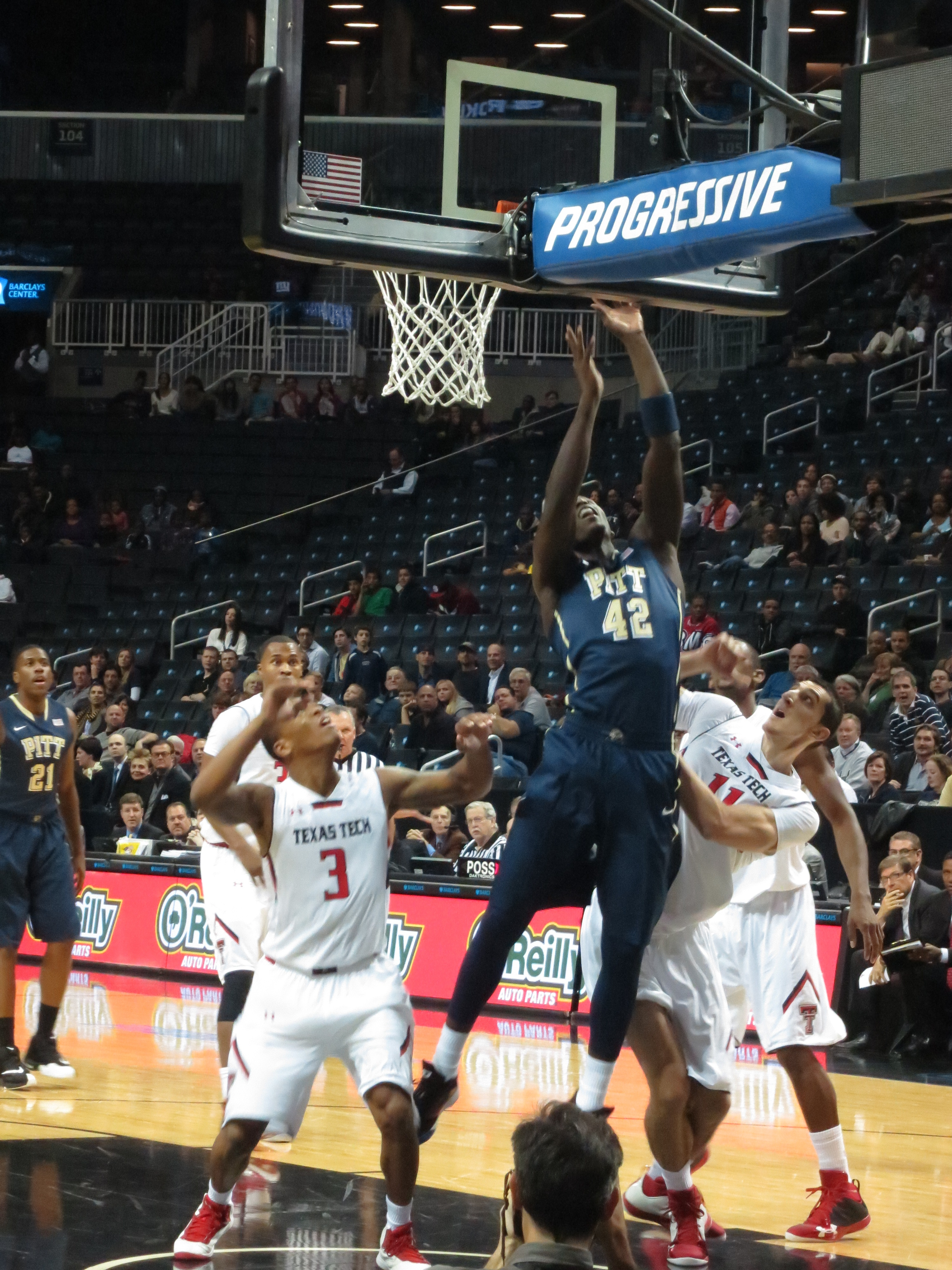
Talib Zanna

- Brandin Knight (1999–2003) 1,440
- Lamar Patterson (2009–2014) 1,392
- Jerry McCullough (1991–1996) 1,342
- Sean Miller (1987–1992) 1,282
- Bobby Martin (1987–1991) 1,282
- Chevon Troutman (2001–2005) 1,274
- Jaron Brown (2000–2004) 1,258
- Levance Fields (2005–2009) 1,247
- Jerome Lane (1985–1988) 1,217
- Curtis Aiken (1983–1987) 1,200
- Bob Lazor (1954–1957) 1,175
- John Riser (1954–1957) 1,164
- Kent Scott (1969–1972) 1,143
- Isaac Hawkins (1996–2001) 1,127
- Calvin Sheffield (1961–1964) 1,115
- Brian Generalovich (1961–1964) 1,114
- Aaron Gray (2003–2007) 1,109
- Tray Woodall (2008–2013) 1,108
- Donatas Zavackas (1999–2003) 1,099
- Ronald Ramon (2004–2008) 1,096
- Brad Wanamaker (2007–2011) 1,090
- Talib Zanna (2009–2014) 1,089
- Chris McNeal (1990–1993) 1,067
- Carlton Neverson (1978–1981) 1,057
- Julius Pegues (1955–1958) 1,050
- Rod Brookin (1986–1990) 1,047
- Gilbert Brown (2006–2011) 1,046
- Darelle Porter (1987–1991) 1,007

== NBA players ==
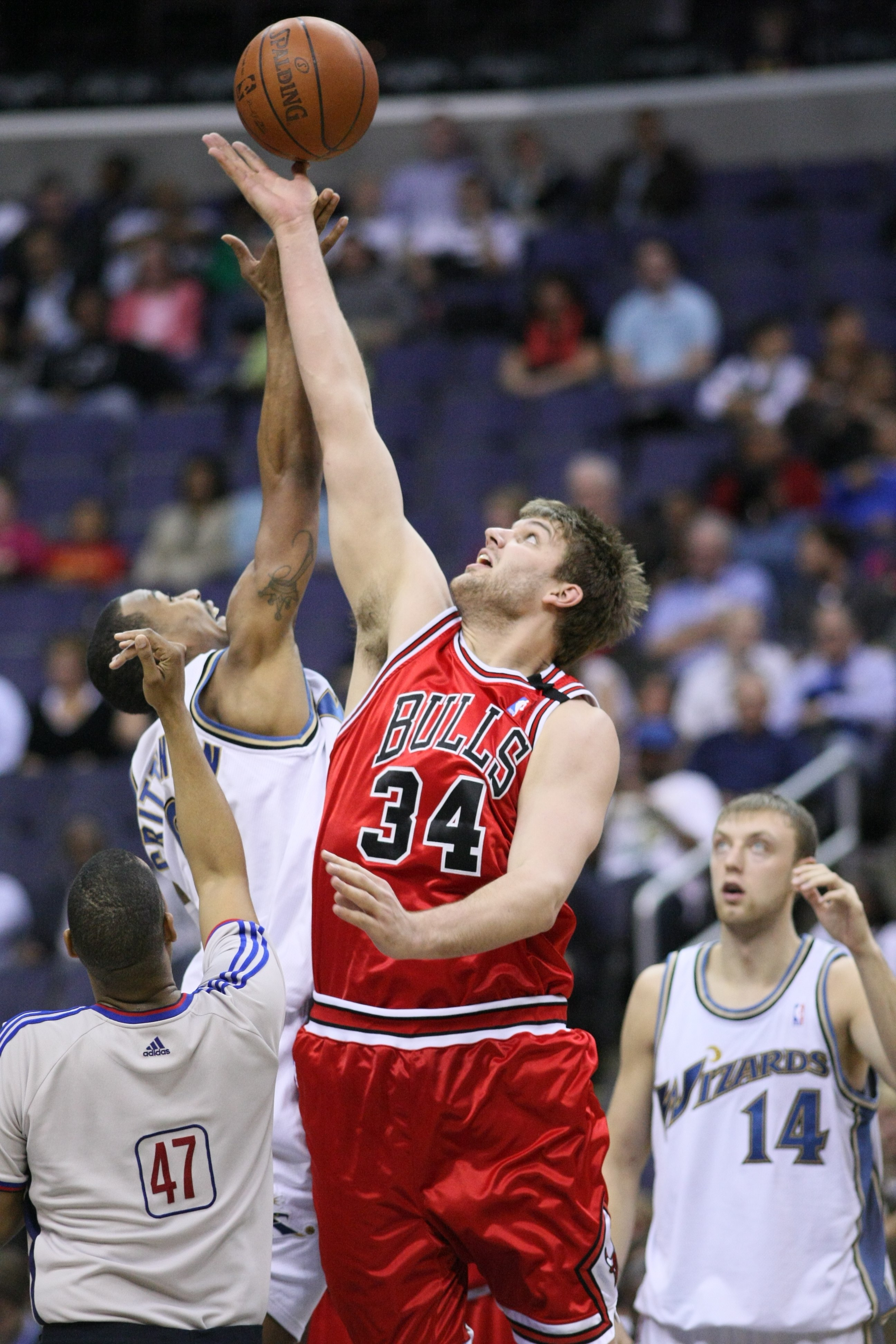
Aaron Gray (#34) was drafted in 2007 by the Chicago Bulls

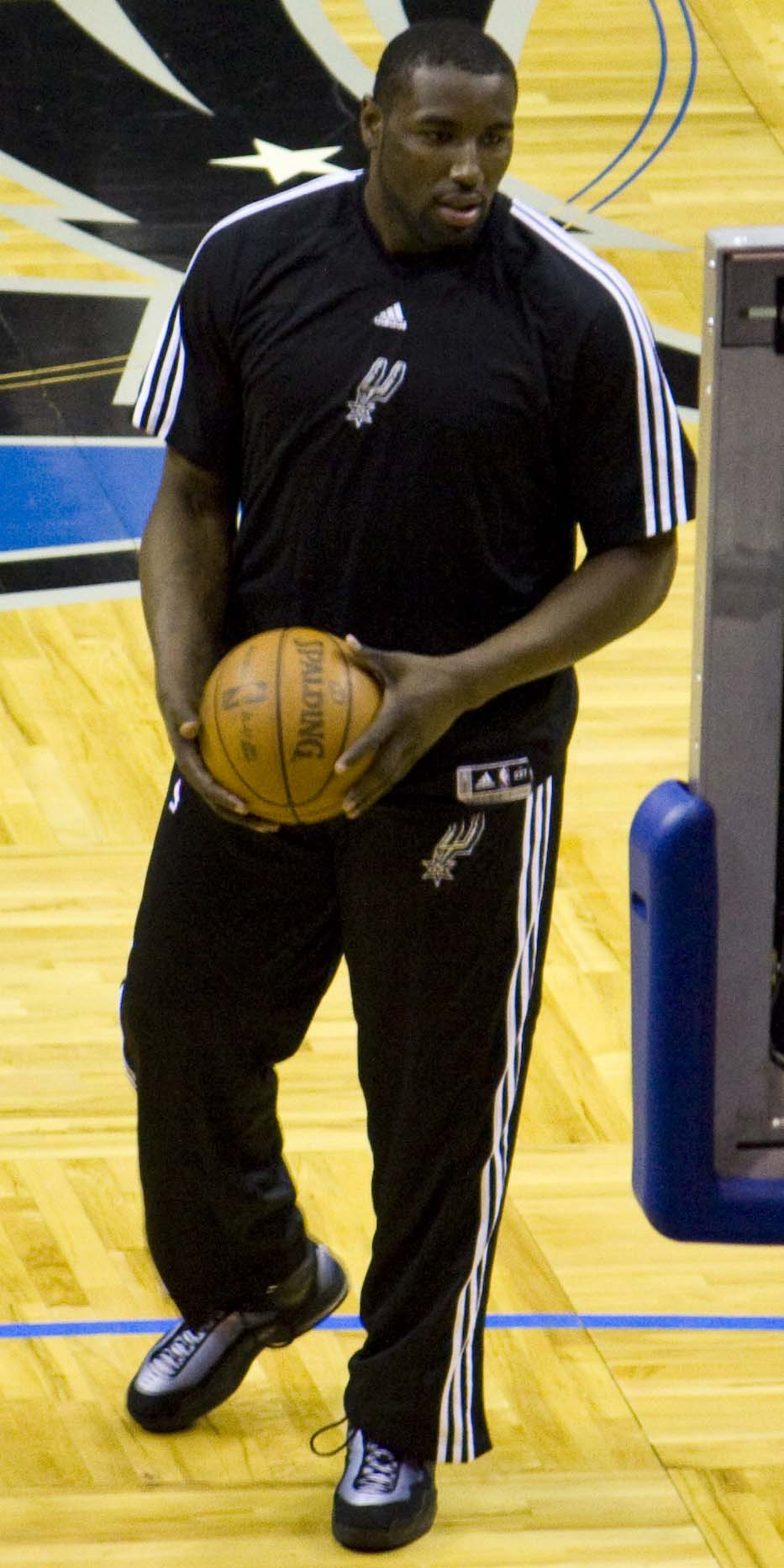
DeJuan Blair was drafted in 2009 by the San Antonio Spurs

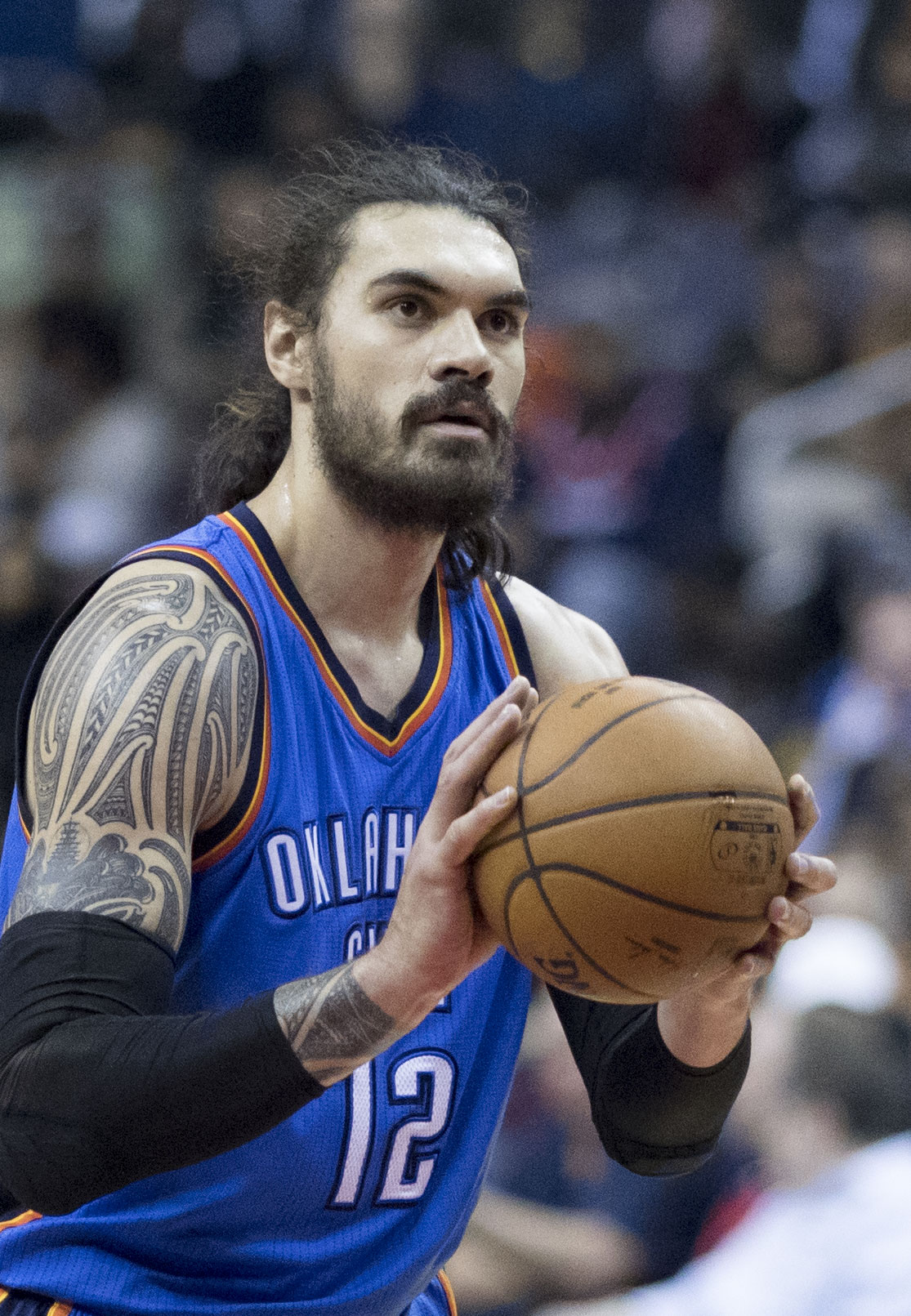
Steven Adams was drafted in 2013 by the Oklahoma City Thunder

Pittsburgh Panthers have been selected 28 times in the NBA draft, 3 times in the ABA draft (Billy Knight was drafted by both the NBA and ABA in 1974). In addition, 11 former Panthers were selected in the CBA draft. Eight Panthers have been selected as first-round NBA draft picks with Bub Carrington being the most recent in 2024.

In addition, 48 former Panthers have played professionally in international basketball leagues. Clyde Vaughan especially stands out in averaging 28 points per game over his decade-long basketball career in Europe.

Panthers in the NBA & ABA Draft
Year	Player	Round	Pick	Team
1954	Dutch Burch	5	40	Pistons
1957	Bob Lazor	9	66	Pistons
1958	Julius Pegues	4	31	Hawks
1959	Don Hennon	6	41	Kings
1964	Brian Generalovich	3	19	Knicks
1974	Billy Knight	1	6	Pacers (ABA)
1974	Billy Knight	2	21	Lakers
1974	Mickey Martin	4	69	Pistons
1975	Mel Bennett	1	9	Squires (ABA)
1975	Kirk Bruce	8	75	Stars (ABA)
1976	Keith Starr	4	56	Bulls
1978	Larry Harris	4	73	Clippers
1979	Terry Knight	6	125	Spurs
1980	Sammie Ellis	4	73	Nuggets
1981	Carlton Neverson	3	56	Warriors
1981	Sam Clancy	3	62	Suns
1983	Trent Johnson	8	83	Celtics
1984	Clyde Vaughan	6	117	Pacers
1988	Charles Smith	1	3	76ers (Note: traded on draft day to the Clippers)
1988	Jerome Lane	1	23	Nuggets
1992	Darren Morningstar	2	47	Celtics
1994	Eric Mobley	1	18	Bucks
1996	Mark Blount	2	55	SuperSonics
1999	Vonteego Cummings	1	26	Pacers (Note: traded on draft day to the Warriors)
2005	Chris Taft	2	42	Warriors
2007	Aaron Gray	2	49	Bulls
2009	Sam Young	2	36	Grizzlies
2009	DeJuan Blair	2	37	Spurs
2013	Steven Adams	1	12	Thunder
2014	Lamar Patterson	2	48	Bucks (Note: traded on draft day to the Hawks)
2024	Bub Carrington	1	14	Trail Blazers (Note: traded on draft day to the Wizards)

== Panthers playing in international leagues ==
- Khem Birch, playing in the Greek Basketball League
- Marcus Carr, playing in the Lega Basket Serie A
- Federiko Federiko, playing in the Cyprus Basketball Division A
- Ryan Luther, playing in the Japanese B.League
- Lamar Patterson, playing in the Australian National Basketball League
