= Sykes Reed =

American basketball player and dentist

Personal information
- Born: December 14, 1904 Braddock, Pennsylvania, U.S.
- Died: March 21, 1972 (aged 67) Fort Lauderdale, Florida, U.S.
- Listed height: 6 ft 0 in (1.83 m)

Career information
- High school: Braddock (Braddock, Pennsylvania)
- College: Pittsburgh (1926–1928)
- Position: Guard

Career highlights
- Helms Foundation All-American (1928)

Wallace Sykes Reed (December 14, 1904 – March 21, 1972) was an American basketball player and dentist, best known for his All-American college career at the University of Pittsburgh (Pitt).

Sykes came from Braddock, Pennsylvania, where he played basketball for Braddock High School with future Pitt teammate Stash Wrobleski. The two came to Pitt to play for future Hall of Fame coach Doc Carlson and, in the 1927–28 season, were both starters on the Panthers' first undefeated team. Reed captained the team and at the end of the season was named an All-American along with teammate Chuck Hyatt. The squad finished the season 21–0 and would later be honored as historical national champions by both the Helms Athletic Foundation and the Premo-Porretta Power Poll.

Following his basketball career, Reed became a dentist and refereed local basketball and football games. He died of an apparent heart attack while playing golf in Fort Lauderdale, Florida.
