= Americans in Ireland =

Cultural group

Meiriceánaigh in Éirinn

Total population
- 38,000

Regions with significant populations
- Dublin, Cork and rural towns of Ireland

Languages
- Irish · English (Irish · American) and Spanish

Religion
- Roman Catholicism · Protestantism

Related ethnic groups
- Irish Americans · Americans in the United Kingdom

Americans in Ireland comprise Irish citizens and residents who have full or partial American descent or ancestral background. These individuals often use the term 'American-Irish', in order to differentiate from the Irish-American cultural group.

== Demographics ==
Those with American-Irish dual citizenship represent 16.8% of all Irish people with dual nationality. As of 2016, there are 10,519 Americans in Ireland without any Irish citizenship.

== Culture and integration ==
Voter registration drives occurred in the run-up to the 2020 American Presidential Election. Democrats Abroad maintains a notable political base in the country. Cultural events, such as the Fourth of July and Thanksgiving are celebrated by the resident American population, as well as other affiliated groups. Several towns with large American populations host fireworks displays, while the American Chamber of Commerce hosts an annual Thanksgiving dinner, which is attended by the Taoiseach.

== Notable people ==
- Erskine Hamilton Childers – 4th President of Ireland
- Éamon de Valera – 3rd President of Ireland
- Frank McCourt – Irish-American writer
- Marsha Hunt – African American singer and novelist
- Matt Doyle – Irish professional tour tennis player
- Constantine Fitzgibbon – Historian and novelist
- Chryss Goulandris – American businesswoman
- Lennie McMillian – Irish professional basketball player
- Tom Molineaux – Bare-knuckle boxer
- Charles Stewart Parnell – Founder and leader of the Irish Parliamentary Party
- Darren Randolph – Irish football goalkeeper
- Saoirse Ronan – American-born Irish actress
- Kevin Shields – American-born Irish musician
- Des Bishop – American-raised Irish comedian
- Ronan O'Gara – American born rugby player
- Dana Rosemary Scallon – singer and politician
- Katherine Zappone – American-born Irish Senator and academic

== See also ==
- Irish American
- Ireland–United States relations
- Americans in the United Kingdom
