= Claire Cribbs =

American basketball player and coach

Personal information
- Born: August 13, 1912 Irwin, Pennsylvania, U.S.
- Died: September 14, 1985 (aged 73) Bellaire, Ohio, U.S.
- Listed height: 6 ft 0 in (1.83 m)

Career information
- High school: Jeannette (Jeannette, Pennsylvania)
- College: Pittsburgh (1932–1935)
- Position: Guard
- Number: 30

Career highlights
- 2x Consensus All-American (1934, 1935); 3x All-Eastern Intercollegiate Conference (1933–1935)

Claire Linton Cribbs (August 13, 1912 – September 14, 1985) was an American basketball player and high school coach. He was a two-time All-American at the University of Pittsburgh and won over 400 games as a high school coach in the state of Ohio.

Cribbs, a 6'0 (1.83 m) guard from Jeannette High School in Jeannette, Pennsylvania, chose to attend the nearby University of Pittsburgh and play for Hall of Fame coach Doc Carlson. Cribbs led the Panthers to a 53–15 record in his three varsity seasons, winning the Eastern Intercollegiate Conference in 1933 and 1934 and tying for the championship with West Virginia in 1935. Cribbs was the star of these teams, garnering all-conference honors all three years and consensus All-American honors as a junior and senior.

After graduating from Pitt, Cribbs briefly played baseball as a pitcher for the International League's Baltimore Orioles. He then became a teacher and coach at Warren Consolidated High School in Tiltonsville, Ohio, where he coached future baseball Hall of Famer Bill Mazeroski. After a tour in the U. S. Navy during World War II, he became a history teacher and boys' basketball coach at Bellaire High School in Bellaire, Ohio, in 1949. He remained coach there until his retirement in 1977, winning over 400 games and at one point leading the Big Reds to victory for 54 consecutive home games.

Claire Cribbs is enshrined in the University of Pittsburgh Hall of Fame, as well as the Ohio basketball coaches, Dapper Dan, and Westmoreland County (PA) halls of fame. He died on September 14, 1985, in Bellaire.
