= 1927–28 Pittsburgh Panthers men's basketball team =

American college basketball season

1927–28 Pittsburgh Panthers men's basketball
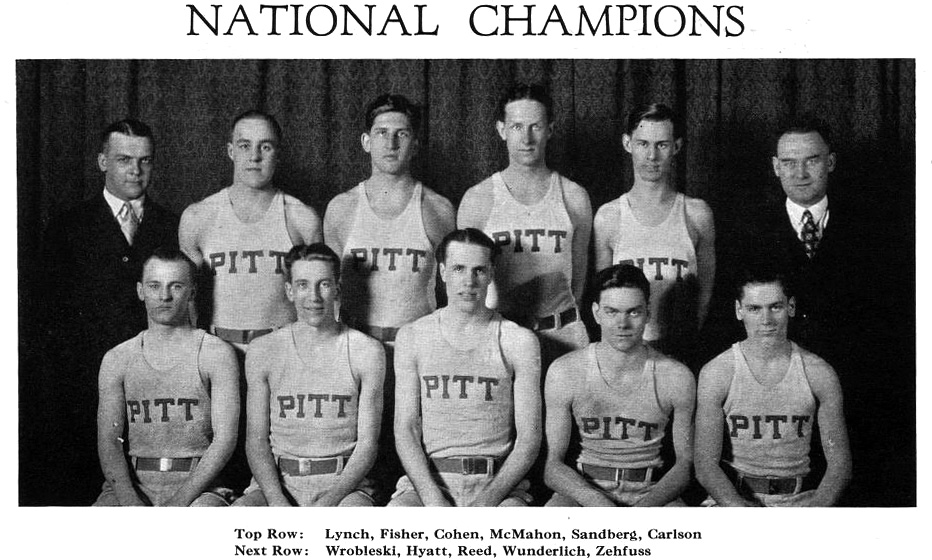

Veteran Athletes of Philadelphia national champions Helms Foundation national champions
- Conference: Independent
- Record: 21–0
- Head coach: Doc Carlson (6th season)
- Captain: Sykes Reed
- Home arena: Pitt Pavilion

The 1927–28 Pittsburgh Panthers men's basketball team represented the University of Pittsburgh during the 1927–28 NCAA men's basketball season in the United States. The head coach was Doc Carlson, coaching in his sixth season with the Panthers. The team finished the season with a 21–0 record.

The 1929 edition of The Owl yearbook notes that the team was "universally recognized as national champions, having hung up the best collegiate record in the country." The team was awarded the 'U. S. Senator Boies Penrose Memorial Trophy' for the national championship by the Veteran Athletes of Philadelphia.

It is the only undefeated team in Pitt's history, and that season they were one of only two teams to finish with an unblemished record. Chuck Hyatt and Sykes Reed were named consensus All-Americans at the end of the season.

The team was retroactively named the national champion by the Helms Athletic Foundation in 1943 and was retroactively listed as the season's top team by the Premo-Porretta Power Poll in 1995 (the Panthers received retroactive recognition as the Helms national champion for the 1929–30 season as well).

== Schedule and results ==
| Date time, TV | Rank^{#} | Opponent^{#} | Result | Record | Site city, state |
Regular season
| 12/15/1927* | | at Michigan | W 49–39 | 1–0 | Yost Field House; Ann Arbor, MI |
| 12/16/1927* | | at Chicago | W 36–26 | 2–0 | Chicago, IL |
| 12/17/1927* | | at Northwestern | W 39–34 | 3–0 | Old Patten Gymnasium; Evanston, IL |
| 12/19/1927* | | at Iowa | W 44–40 ^{OT} | 4–0 | Iowa Field House; Iowa City, IA |
| 12/23/1927* | | Dartmouth | W 64–33 | 5–0 | Pitt Pavilion; Pittsburgh, PA |
| 12/31/1927* | | Ohio State | W 50–32 | 6–0 | Pitt Pavilion; Pittsburgh, PA |
| 1/6/1928* | | Syracuse | W 45–24 | 7–0 | Pitt Pavilion; Pittsburgh, PA |
| 1/13/1928* | | Carnegie Tech | W 67–38 | 8–0 | Pitt Pavilion; Pittsburgh, PA |
| 1/18/1928* | | West Virginia | W 51–26 | 9–0 | Pitt Pavilion; Pittsburgh, PA |
| 2/3/1928* | | at Colgate | W 48–37 | 10–0 | Hamilton, NY |
| 2/4/1928* | | at Army | W 42–36 | 11–0 | West Point, NY |
| 2/8/1928* | | at Carnegie Tech | W 50–28 | 12–0 | Pittsburgh, PA |
| 2/10/1928* | | Penn State | W 48–25 | 13–0 | Pitt Pavilion; Pittsburgh, PA |
| 2/15/1928* | | Allegheny | W 56–32 | 14–0 | Pitt Pavilion; Pittsburgh, PA |
| 2/18/1928* | | Notre Dame | W 24–22 | 15–0 | Pitt Pavilion; Pittsburgh, PA |
| 2/22/1928* | | at Carnegie Tech | W 59–38 | 16–0 | Pittsburgh, PA |
| 2/25/1928* | | Washington & Jefferson | W 44–33 | 17–0 | Pitt Pavilion; Pittsburgh, PA |
| 2/28/1928* | | Grove City | W 54–27 | 18–0 | Pitt Pavilion; Pittsburgh, PA |
| 3/2/1928* | | at West Virginia | W 45–42 | 19–0 | Morgantown, WV |
| 3/5/1928* | | at Washington & Jefferson | W 33–32 | 20–0 | Washington, PA |
| 3/10/1928* | | at Penn State | W 45–28 | 21–0 | PSU Armory; University Park, PA |
*Non-conference game. ^{#}Rankings from AP Poll. (#) Tournament seedings in parentheses.
