= 1929 NCAA Men's Basketball All-Americans =

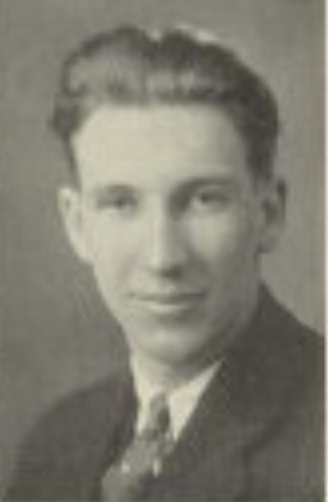
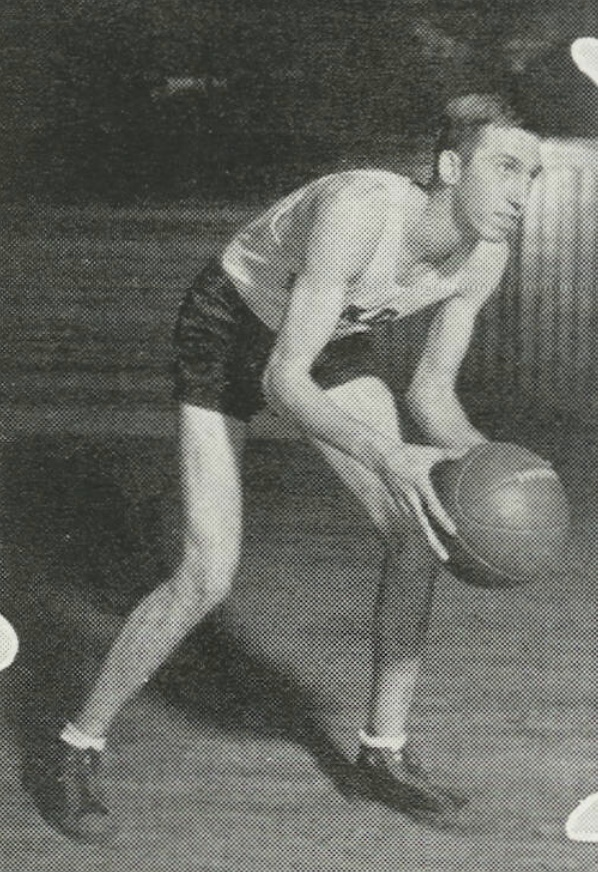
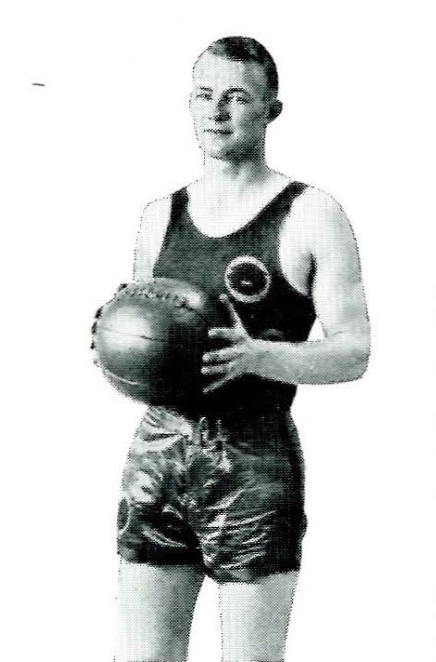
- Members of the 1929 consensus team. From left: Hyatt, Thompson, Murphy. Not pictured: Churchill, Corbin, Schaaf.
- Awarded for: 1928–29 NCAA men's basketball season

The consensus 1929 College Basketball All-American team, as determined by aggregating the results of two major All-American teams. To earn "consensus" status, a player must win honors from a majority of the following teams: the Helms Athletic Foundation, College Humor Magazine and the Christy Walsh Syndicate.

== 1929 Consensus All-America team ==
Consensus Team
Player	Class	Team
Tom Churchill	Junior	Oklahoma
Vern Corbin	Senior	California
Charley Hyatt	Junior	Pittsburgh
Stretch Murphy	Junior	Purdue
Joe Schaaf	Senior	Pennsylvania
Cat Thompson	Junior	Montana State

== Individual All-America teams ==
All-America Team
All-America Team	First team		Second team		Third team	
All-America Team	Player	School	Player	School	Player	School
Helms	Vern Corbin	California	No second or third teams			
Helms	Bruce Drake	Oklahoma	No second or third teams			
Helms	Charley Hyatt	Pittsburgh	No second or third teams			
Helms	Gene Lambert	Arkansas	No second or third teams			
Helms	Stretch Murphy	Purdue	No second or third teams			
Helms	Harlow Rothert	Stanford	No second or third teams			
Helms	Joe Schaaf	Pennsylvania	No second or third teams			
Helms	Carey Spicer	Kentucky	No second or third teams			
Helms	Cat Thompson	Montana State	No second or third teams			
Helms	Frank Ward	Montana State	No second or third teams			
College Humor	Tom Churchill	Oklahoma	Vern Corbin	California	Howard Bollerman	Colgate
College Humor	Charley Hyatt	Pittsburgh	Ed Dougherty	Fordham	Werner Jensen	Creighton
College Humor	Stretch Murphy	Purdue	Marshall Glenn	West Virginia	Jesse Mortensen	Southern California
College Humor	Tom Pickell	Arkansas	Oral Hildebrand	Butler	Jim Strickland	Indiana
College Humor	Joe Schaaf	Pennsylvania	Elmer Tenhopen	Wisconsin	Maurice Swarthout	Dartmouth
College Humor	Ed Wineapple	Providence	Joseph Truskowski	Michigan		
Christy Walsh Syndicate	Tom Churchill	Oklahoma	No second or third teams			
Christy Walsh Syndicate	Vern Corbin	California	No second or third teams			
Christy Walsh Syndicate	Ed Dougherty	Fordham	No second or third teams			
Christy Walsh Syndicate	Bud Foster	Wisconsin	No second or third teams			
Christy Walsh Syndicate	Charley Hyatt	Pittsburgh	No second or third teams			
Christy Walsh Syndicate	Harold McClary	Washington	No second or third teams			
Christy Walsh Syndicate	Ernest McCoy	Michigan	No second or third teams			
Christy Walsh Syndicate	Stretch Murphy	Purdue	No second or third teams			
Christy Walsh Syndicate	Joe Schaaf	Pennsylvania	No second or third teams			
Christy Walsh Syndicate	Edward Smith	Notre Dame	No second or third teams			
Christy Walsh Syndicate	Cat Thompson	Montana State	No second or third teams			

== See also ==
- 1928–29 NCAA men's basketball season
