= Victor Holt =

American basketball player (1908–1988)

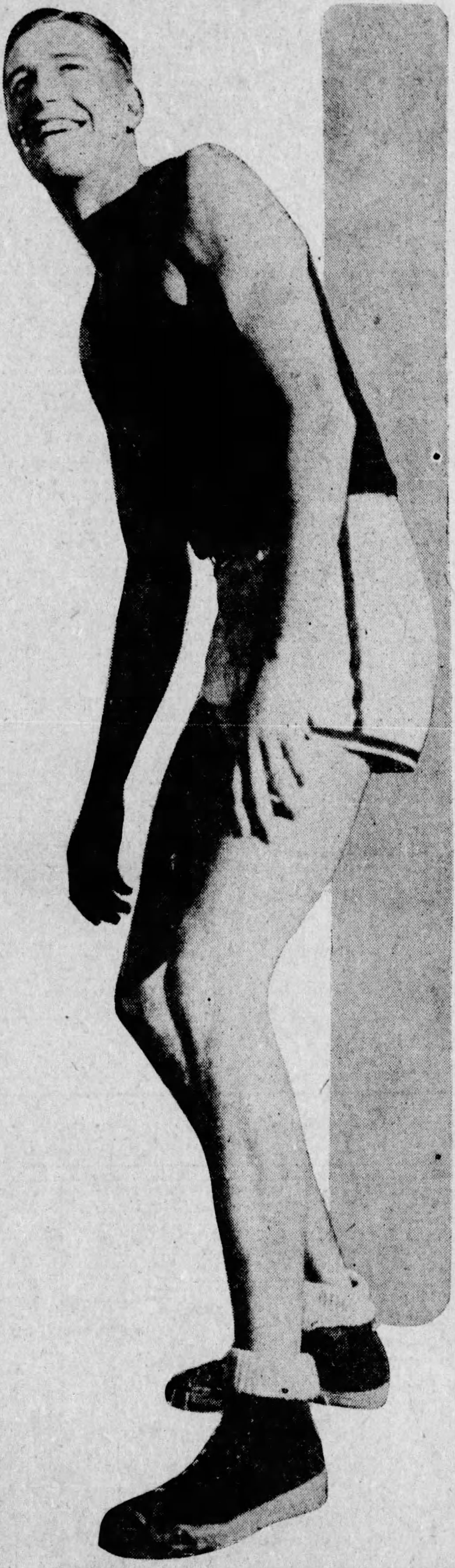

Personal information
- Born: May 8, 1908 Oklahoma City, Oklahoma, U.S.
- Died: April 22, 1988 (aged 79) Palm Beach, Florida, U.S.
- Listed height: 6 ft 6 in (1.98 m)

Career information
- High school: Oklahoma City (Oklahoma City, Oklahoma)
- College: Oklahoma (1925–1928)
- Position: Center

Career highlights
- 2× AAU All-American (1928, 1929); Helms National Player of the Year (1928); Helms All-American (1928); First-team All-MVC (1928)

Victor Holt, Jr. (May 8, 1908 – April 22, 1988) was an American college basketball standout at Oklahoma in the late 1920s. He was an All-American and the Helms National Player of the Year in 1928. Holt was the University of Oklahoma's first national player of the year in men's basketball.

After college he played basketball in the Amateur Athletic Union (AAU) for Cook's Painter Boys, located in Kansas City, Missouri. With them he won two national championships in 1928 and 1929.

After basketball he worked for Goodyear Tire Company, ultimately became its 10th president, and also became an auto racing enthusiast and co-owner. He also is notable for having suggested the name of the famous auto-racing empire Dan Gurney's All American Racers, in which he was a partner/co-owner.
