= Whitey Baccus =

American basketball player and coach (1911–1968)

Biographical details
- Born: November 13, 1911
- Died: August 1, 1968 (aged 56); Bonham, Texas, U.S.

Playing career

Football
- 1932: SMU
- 1934: SMU

Basketball
- 1932–1935: SMU

Coaching career (HC unless noted)

Basketball
- 1938–1942: SMU
- 1945–1947: SMU

Head coaching record
- Overall: 55–71

Forrest Clyde "Whitey" Baccus (November 13, 1911 – August 1, 1968) was a college basketball player and men's college basketball head coach at Southern Methodist University. Baccus was a forward for the SMU Mustangs men's basketball team for three seasons. He received all-Southwest Conference honors and was recognized as a third-team All-American by Converse following the 1934–35 season, in which he captained SMU's first-ever Southwest Conference championship team in basketball under head coach Jimmie St. Clair. He would go on to coach SMU in basketball for six seasons (1938–42, 1945–47), finishing with an overall record of 55–71 (.437).

== Head coaching record ==
Record table
Season	Team	Overall	Conference	Standing	Postseason
SMU Mustangs (Southwest Conference) (1938–1942)
1938–39	SMU	14–8	8–4	3rd	
1939–40	SMU	7–13	5–7	T–5th	
1940–41	SMU	10–10	6–6	T–4th	
1941–42	SMU	3–16	1–11	7th	
SMU Mustangs (Southwest Conference) (1945–1947)
1945–46	SMU	7–16	0–12	7th	
1946–47	SMU	14–8	8–4	T–2nd	
SMU:		55–71 (.437)	28–44 (.389)		
Total:		55–71 (.437)			
