= Darren Morningstar =

American basketball player (born 1969)

Personal information
- Born: April 22, 1969 (age 57) Stevenson, Washington, U.S.
- Listed height: 6 ft 10 in (2.08 m)
- Listed weight: 325 lb (147 kg)

Career information
- High school: Stevenson (Stevenson, Washington)
- College: Navy (1987–1988); Pittsburgh (1989–1992)
- NBA draft: 1992: 2nd round, 47th overall pick
- Drafted by: Boston Celtics
- Playing career: 1992–1998
- Position: Center
- Number: 50, 55

Career history
- 1992–1993: Fargo-Moorhead Fever
- 1993: Dallas Mavericks
- 1993–1994: Fargo-Moorhead Fever
- 1994: Utah Jazz
- 1994: Rapid City Thrillers
- 1994: CB Murcia
- 1994–1995: Andino de La Rioja
- 1995: TDK Manresa
- 1996–1997: Floor Padova
- 1997: Gigantes de Carolina
- 1997–1998: Serapide Pozzuoli
- 1998: Capitanes de Arecibo
- 1998: Grand Rapids Hoops

Career highlights
- Third-team All-Big East (1992)
- Stats at NBA.com
- Stats at Basketball Reference

Darren Morningstar (born April 22, 1969) is an American former professional basketball player who was selected by the Boston Celtics in the second round (47th pick overall) of the 1992 NBA draft. A 6'10" and 325 lb center, Morningstar played in only one NBA season, splitting time with the Dallas Mavericks and Utah Jazz. He played college basketball for the Navy Midshipmen and Pittsburgh Panthers.
