= 1935 NCAA Men's Basketball All-Americans =

- Awarded for: 1934–35 NCAA men's basketball season

Glenn Roberts was a Helms Foundation All-America selection at Emory and Henry.

The consensus 1935 College Basketball All-American team, as determined by aggregating the results of two major All-American teams. To earn "consensus" status, a player must win honors from a majority of the following teams: the Helms Athletic Foundation and Converse.

== 1935 Consensus All-America team ==
Consensus Team
Player	Class	Team
Omar Browning	Senior	Oklahoma
Claire Cribbs	Senior	Pittsburgh
Leroy Edwards	Sophomore	Kentucky
Jack Gray	Senior	Texas
Lee Guttero	Senior	Southern California

== Individual All-America teams ==
All-America Team
All-America Team	First team		Second team		Third team	
All-America Team	Player	School	Player	School	Player	School
Helms	Wesley Bennett	Westminster	No second or third teams			
Helms	Al Bonniwell	Dartmouth	No second or third teams			
Helms	Omar Browning	Oklahoma	No second or third teams			
Helms	Claire Cribbs	Pittsburgh	No second or third teams			
Helms	Leroy Edwards	Kentucky	No second or third teams			
Helms	Jack Gray	Texas	No second or third teams			
Helms	Lee Guttero	Southern California	No second or third teams			
Helms	George Ireland	Notre Dame	No second or third teams			
Helms	Bill Nash	Columbia	No second or third teams			
Helms	Glen Roberts	Emory and Henry	No second or third teams			
Converse	Paul Birch	Duquesne	Omar Browning	Oklahoma	Whitey Baccus	Southern Methodist
Converse	Claire Cribbs	Pittsburgh	Leroy Edwards	Kentucky	Norman Cottom	Purdue
Converse	Jack Gray	Texas	Bill Haarlow	Chicago	Bill Kinner	Utah
Converse	Lee Guttero	Southern California	George Lacy	Richmond	Rolf Poser	Wisconsin
Converse	Malcolm Wade	Louisiana State	Ed Shaver	Purdue	Waldo Wegner	Iowa State

== See also ==
- 1934–35 NCAA men's basketball season
