= Vern Corbin =

American basketball player

Personal information
- Died: June 10, 1965 (aged 58) Los Angeles, California
- Listed height: 6 ft 2 in (1.88 m)
- Listed weight: 180 lb (82 kg)

Career information
- High school: Piedmont (Piedmont, California)
- College: California (1926–1929)
- Position: Center

Career highlights
- Consensus All-American (1929); All-Pacific Coast Conference (1929); California Mr. Basketball (1924)

Lavern Corbin (died June 10, 1965) was an American basketball player who was an NCAA All-American as a senior at Cal in 1929. A center, Corbin played three seasons of college basketball between 1926–27 and 1928–29. Cal won conference titles every one of those years, and he twice led the league in scoring. He was an All-Pacific Coast Conference selection in 1929. In high school, Corbin was a heralded player at Piedmont High School in Piedmont, California.

Corbin died of cancer on June 10, 1965, in Los Angeles.
