= Keith Starr =

American basketball player

Personal information
- Born: March 14, 1954 (age 72) Sewickley, Pennsylvania, U.S.
- Listed height: 6 ft 6 in (1.98 m)
- Listed weight: 190 lb (86 kg)

Career information
- High school: Quaker Valley (Leetsdale, Pennsylvania)
- College: Pittsburgh (1972–1975)
- NBA draft: 1976: 4th round, 52nd overall pick
- Drafted by: Chicago Bulls
- Playing career: 1976–1982
- Position: Shooting guard
- Number: 30
- Coaching career: 1985–1992

Career history

Playing
- 1976–1977: Chicago Bulls
- 1978: West Virginia Wheels
- 1982: Las Vegas Silvers

Coaching
- 1985–1989: UNLV (assistant)
- 1989–1990: Cal State Fullerton (assistant)
- 1990–1992: UNLV (assistant)
- Stats at NBA.com
- Stats at Basketball Reference

Keith Edward Starr (born March 14, 1954) is an American former professional basketball player and college basketball coach. He played in 17 games during the 1976–77 season for the Chicago Bulls after a collegiate career at the University of Pittsburgh. Starr also played briefly in the Continental Basketball Association in 1982–83 with the Las Vegas Silvers.

== Career statistics ==
Legend
GP	Games played	GS	Games started	MPG	Minutes per game
FG%	Field goal percentage	3P%	3-point field goal percentage	FT%	Free throw percentage
RPG	Rebounds per game	APG	Assists per game	SPG	Steals per game
BPG	Blocks per game	PPG	Points per game	**Bold**	Career high

=== NBA ===
==== Regular season ====
Year	Team	GP	MPG	FG%	FT%	RPG	APG	SPG	BPG	PPG
1976–77	Chicago	17	3.8	.250	1.000	.6	.4	.1	.0	.8

== Coaching career and later life ==
Starr became a volunteer assistant coach for UNLV from 1985 to 1989. He left UNLV to be an assistant coach at Cal State Fullerton for the 1989–90 season but resigned halfway through the year due to differences with head coach John Sneed. Starr then returned to UNLV for two more seasons, but he had already missed out on being a part of the team's 1989–90 NCAA national championship season.

Right after his coaching career ended in 1992, Starr went into insurance sales and created his own State Farm agency.
