= Lee Guttero =

American basketball player

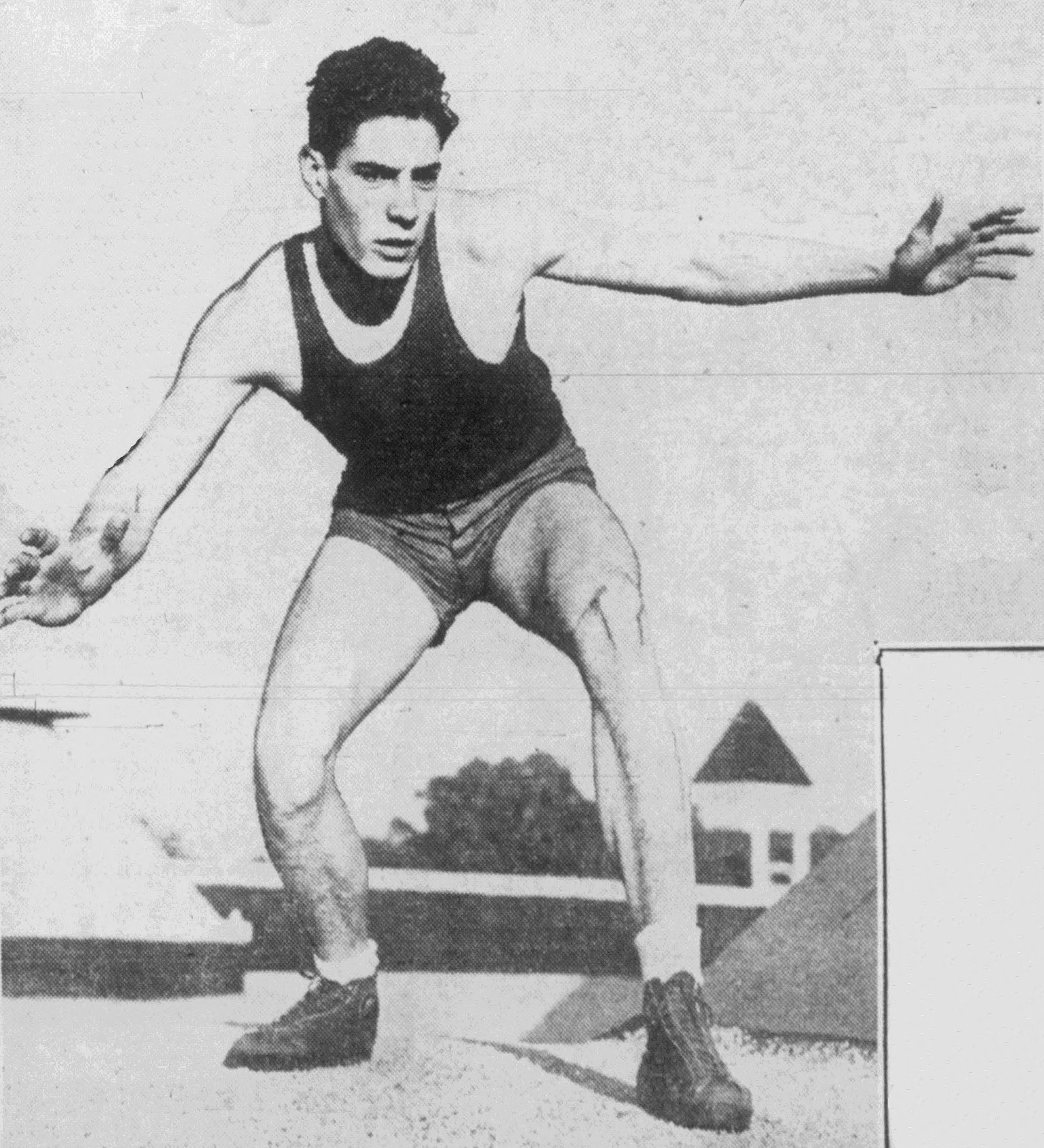
- Guttero, circa 1933

Personal information
- Born: July 1, 1913
- Died: August 29, 2004 (aged 91) Torrance, California, U.S.
- Listed height: 6 ft 2 in (1.88 m)

Career information
- High school: Abraham Lincoln (Los Angeles, California)
- College: USC (1932–1935)
- Position: Center

Career highlights
- Consensus All-American (1935); 2× All-PCC (1934, 1935); California Mr. Basketball (1930)

Lee A. "Rubberlegs" Guttero (July 1, 1913 – August 29, 2004) was an American basketball player who was the University of Southern California's first two-time NCAA All-American.

Guttero, a 6 ft 2 in (1.88 m) center from California, played for the Trojans from 1932–33 to 1934–35 and led the team in scoring every season. He guided them to three consecutive Pacific Coast Conference championships, and during his tenure USC compiled an overall record of 54–19. Guttero was named an All-American in 1934, then a consensus All-American in 1935. He also earned three all-conference selections, and in his senior season of 1934–35 he set a still-standing school record by scoring 34.6% of his team's points. USC enshrined him into their Athletics Hall of Fame in 2002.

He died on August 29, 2004, due to kidney failure.
