= Joe Schaaf =

American basketball player

- Schaaf in 1951

Personal information
- Born: August 8, 1908 Wisconsin, U.S.
- Died: June 5, 1997 (aged 88)

Career information
- College: Penn (1926–1929)
- Position: Forward

Career highlights
- 2× Consensus All-American (1928, 1929)

Joseph G. Schaaf (August 8, 1908 – June 5, 1997) was an American basketball player who was a two-time NCAA All-American at Penn in 1928 and 1929. A forward, Schaaf led the Eastern Intercollegiate League in scoring as a senior en route to Penn's conference championship. He set a then-single season league record with 144 points scored.

After college, Schaaf served as an assistant coach for the team and played for the Penn Athletic Club (Penn AC) men's team in Eastern Athletic League. He then coached Reading Central Catholic High School in Reading, Pennsylvania for 24 years and compiled an overall record of 335–307.
