= 1929–30 Pittsburgh Panthers men's basketball team =

American college basketball season

1929–30 Pittsburgh Panthers men's basketball
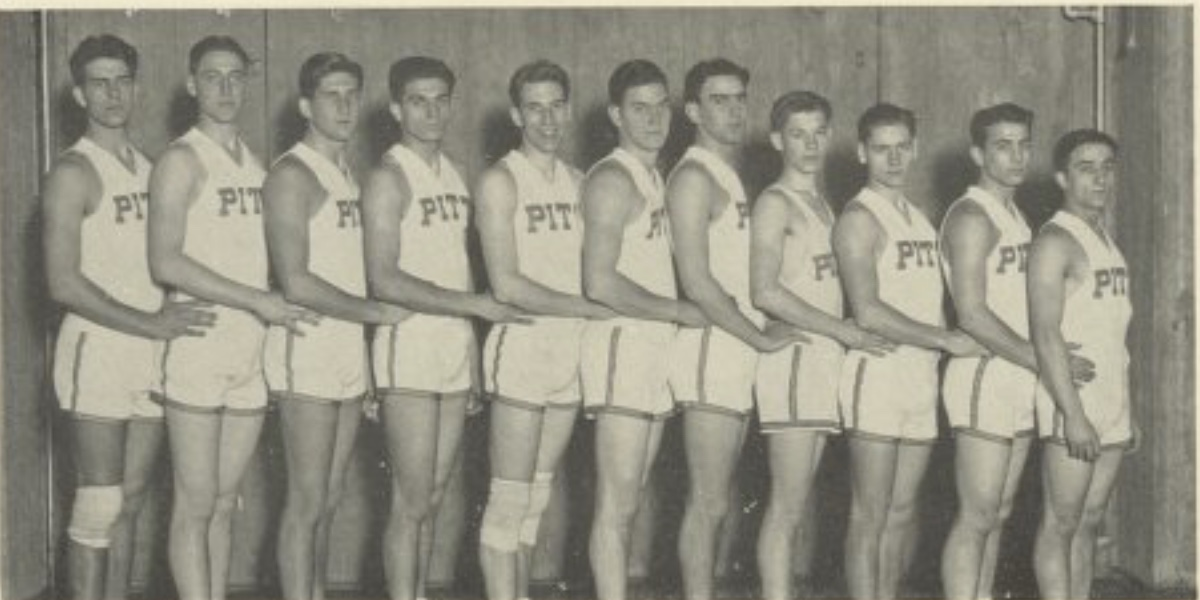

Helms Foundation National Champions
- Conference: Independent
- Record: 23–2
- Head coach: Doc Carlson (8th season)
- MVP: Chuck Hyatt
- Captain: Chuck Hyatt
- Home arena: Pitt Pavilion

The 1929–30 Pittsburgh Panthers men's basketball team represented the University of Pittsburgh during the 1929–30 NCAA men's basketball season in the United States. The head coach was Doc Carlson, coaching in his eighth season with the Panthers. The team finished the season with a 23–2 record and in 1943 was named national champion by Bill Schroeder of the Helms Athletic Foundation Chuck Hyatt was named a consensus All-American for the third consecutive season, led the nation in scoring for a second time in his career, and capped off his collegiate career by being named the national player of the year.

== Schedule and results ==
Date time, TV	Rank^{#}	Opponent^{#}	Result	Record	Site city, state
Regular season
12/7/1929*		Muskingum	W 57–30	1–0	Pitt Pavilion; Pittsburgh, PA
12/13/1929*		at Indiana	W 35–31	2–0	The Fieldhouse; Bloomington, IN
12/14/1929*		at Northwestern	W 38–30	3–0	Old Patten Gymnasium; Evanston, IL
12/16/1929*		at Iowa	W 29–21	4–0	Iowa Field House; Iowa City, IA
12/21/1929*		Grove City	W 38–30	5–0	Pitt Pavilion; Pittsburgh, PA
12/31/1929*		Ohio State	W 38–33 ^{OT}	6–0	Pitt Pavilion; Pittsburgh, PA
1/4/1930*		Nebraska	W 34–27	7–0	Pitt Pavilion; Pittsburgh, PA
1/6/1930*		Montana State	W 38–37	8–0	Pitt Pavilion; Pittsburgh, PA
1/8/1930*		at Carnegie Tech	W 24–18	9–0	Pittsburgh, PA
1/11/1930*		Georgetown	W 43–26	10–0	Pitt Pavilion; Pittsburgh, PA
1/18/1930*		Notre Dame	W 33–13	11–0	Pitt Pavilion; Pittsburgh, PA
1/24/1930*		Carnegie Tech	W 49–25	12–0	Pitt Pavilion; Pittsburgh, PA
2/1/1930*		at Syracuse	L 29–40	12–1	Archbold Gymnasium; Syracuse, NY
2/2/1930*		at Fordham	W 31–27	13–1	Rose Hill Gymnasium; Bronx, NY
2/8/1930*		at Notre Dame	W 25–16	14–1	Notre Dame Fieldhouse; South Bend, IN
2/14/1930*		Penn State	W 47–20	15–1	Pitt Pavilion; Pittsburgh, PA
2/18/1930*		at Washington & Jefferson	W 38–30	16–1	Washington, PA
2/22/1930*		West Virginia	W 21–19	17–1	Pitt Pavilion; Pittsburgh, PA
2/25/1930*		at Carnegie Tech	W 47–22	18–1	Pittsburgh, PA
3/1/1930*		at Army	W 39–25	19–1	West Point, NY
3/4/1930*		at Temple	W 40–28	20–1	Philadelphia, PA
3/8/1930*		at West Virginia	L 25–33	20–2	WVU Fieldhouse; Morgantown, WV
3/10/1930*		Saint Vincent	W 29–28	21–2	Pitt Pavilion; Pittsburgh, PA
3/12/1930*		Washington & Jefferson	W 67–20	22–2	Pitt Pavilion; Pittsburgh, PA
3/15/1930*		at Penn State	W 47–30	23–2	Rec Hall; University Park, PA
*Non-conference game. ^{#}Rankings from AP Poll. (#) Tournament seedings in parentheses.
