= 1928 NCAA Men's Basketball All-Americans =

Best college basketball players of 1928

- Awarded for: 1927–28 NCAA men's basketball season

The 1928 College Basketball All-American team, as chosen retroactively by the Helms Athletic Foundation. The player highlighted in gold was chosen as the Helms Foundation College Basketball Player of the Year retroactively in 1944.

Player	Team
Victor Holt	Oklahoma
Charley Hyatt	Pittsburgh
Alfred James	Washington
Stretch Murphy	Purdue
Bennie Oosterbaan	Michigan
Sykes Reed	Pittsburgh
Glen Rose	Arkansas
Joe Schaaf	Pennsylvania
Ernest Simpson	Colorado College
Cat Thompson	Montana State

== See also ==
- 1927–28 NCAA men's basketball season
