= Doc Carlson =

American basketball player and coach (1894–1964)

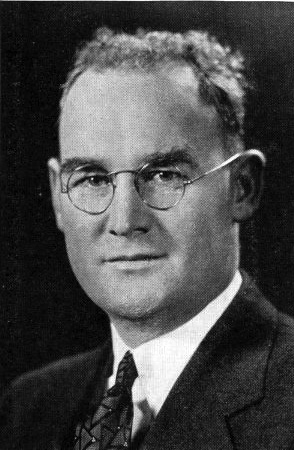

Biographical details
- Born: July 4, 1894; Murray City, Ohio, U.S.
- Died: November 1, 1964 (aged 70); Ligonier, Pennsylvania, U.S.

Playing career

Football
- 1914–1917: Pittsburgh

Basketball
- 1914–1917: Pittsburgh

Baseball
- c. 1917: Pittsburgh
- Position: End (football)

Coaching career (HC unless noted)

Basketball
- 1922–1953: Pittsburgh

Head coaching record
- Overall: 367–248
- Tournaments: 1–1

Accomplishments and honors

Championships
- 2 Helms Athletic Foundation National (1928, 1930); NCAA Final Four (1941); 4 Eastern Intercollegiate Conference (1933–1935, 1937)

Awards
- NABC Most Contributions to the Game (1948)
- Basketball Hall of Fame; Inducted in 1959
- College Basketball Hall of Fame; Inducted in 2006

Henry Clifford "Doc" Carlson (July 4, 1894 – November 1, 1964) was an American basketball coach and football player. He is a Naismith Basketball Hall of Fame inductee as the men's college basketball coach of his alma mater, the University of Pittsburgh, from 1922 to 1953. At Pitt he compiled a record of 367–247 record (.595). His 1927–28 team finished the season with a 21–0 record and was retroactively named the national champion by the Helms Athletic Foundation; Carlson's Panthers would receive retroactive recognition as the Helms national champion for the 1929–30 season as well. In addition, the 1927–28 team would be retroactively listed as the top team of the season by the Premo-Porretta Power Poll. Carlson also led Pitt to the Final Four in 1941. As a student at the university, Carlson was also a First Team All-American end on Pitt's football team under coach "Pop" Warner. Carlson also lettered in basketball and baseball.

== Biography ==
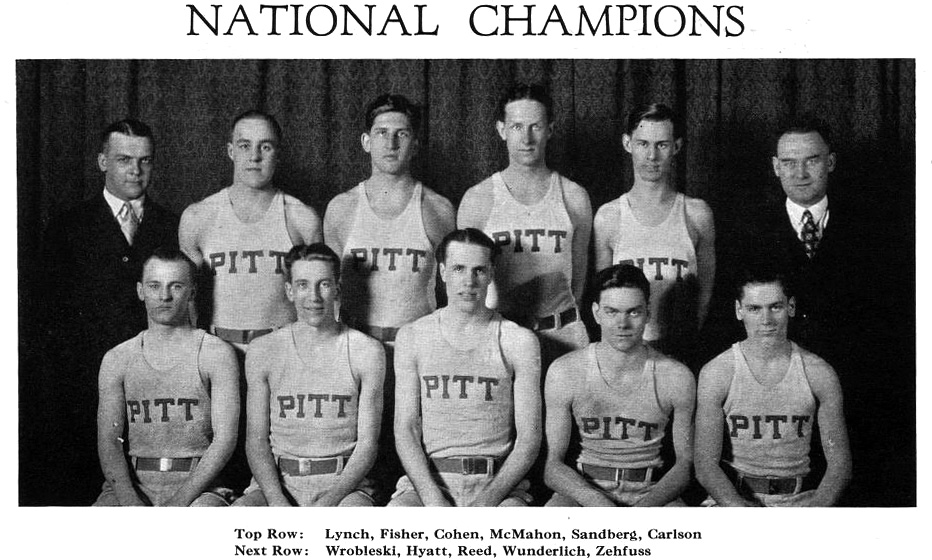
The undefeated 1927–28 Pitt National Championship team featured Naismith Hall of Fame inductee Charley Hyatt.

Carlson was born in Murray City, Ohio. He played high school football, basketball, and baseball (1910–1914) at Bellefonte Academy in Bellefonte, Pennsylvania. During his undergraduate years at the University of Pittsburgh (1914–1918) he earned three letters in basketball, two in baseball, four in football. He played on the 1916 Pitt football team that is widely regarded as that season's national champion and was selected as an All-American football player while playing for Pitt's undefeated 1917 team.

After graduation in 1918, Carlson completed his medical degree at Pitt in 1920, but then joined the Cleveland Indians professional football team for one season. When in 1922 Andrew Kerr, who was Pitt's basketball coach and assistant football coach, left to become football head coach at Stanford University, Pitt hired "Doc" Carlson as its new basketball coach. Simultaneously he practiced as a physician for the Carnegie Steel Company.

Carlson was famous for his Figure 8 offense, an innovation that many coaches copied. In 1928 Pittsburgh went a perfect 21–0 and the national championship. His Panthers won another national title in 1930. (Both were selected as national champions, prior to the advent of NCAA Tournament, by the Helms Athletic Foundation.) He also led the Panthers to Eastern Intercollegiate Conference championships in four out of the seven years of the conference's existence. In 1931 Carlson became the first Eastern coach to take a collegiate team westward, going on the road to beat the University of Kansas, the University of Colorado, Stanford, and the University of Southern California. He also wrote the book You and Basketball.

Legend has it that Carlson offered Stan Musial a basketball scholarship to Pitt, but Musial only wanted to play baseball, and had secretly signed a contract with the St. Louis Cardinals' Monessen, Pennsylvania, ball club of the Class D Pennsylvania State League Association.

Carlson became Pitt's director of student health services in 1932 and held that position until his retirement in 1953. Apart from his brief stint in the NFL, he spent the first 43 years of his adult life at Pitt as a student and coach. He died November 1, 1964, at his home in Ligonier, Pennsylvania.

Carlson was inducted into the Helms Athletic Foundation Hall of Fame in 1949, the Naismith Basketball Hall of Fame in its inaugural class in 1959, and the National Collegiate Basketball Hall of Fame in its inaugural class of 2006.

== Head coaching record ==
Record table
Season	Team	Overall	Conference	Standing	Postseason
Pittsburgh Panthers (Independent) (1922–1932)
1922–23	Pittsburgh	10–5			
1923–24	Pittsburgh	10–7			
1924–25	Pittsburgh	4–10			
1925–26	Pittsburgh	12–5			
1926–27	Pittsburgh	10–7			
1927–28	Pittsburgh	21–0			Helms Foundation National Champions
1928–29	Pittsburgh	16–5			
1929–30	Pittsburgh	23–2			Helms Foundation National Champions
1930–31	Pittsburgh	20–4			
1931–32	Pittsburgh	14–16			
Pittsburgh Panthers (Eastern Intercollegiate Conference) (1932–1939)
1932–33	Pittsburgh	17–5	7–1	1st	
1933–34	Pittsburgh	18–4	8–0	1st	
1934–35	Pittsburgh	18–6	7–2	1st*	American Legion Bowl
1935–36	Pittsburgh	18–9	7–4	2nd*	
1936–37	Pittsburgh	14–7	8–3	1st*	
1937–38	Pittsburgh	9–12	5–5	T–3rd	
1938–39	Pittsburgh	10–8	5–5	T–3rd	
Pittsburgh Panthers (Independent) (1939–1953)
1939–40	Pittsburgh	8–9			
1940–41	Pittsburgh	13–6			NCAA Final Four
1941–42	Pittsburgh	5–10			
1942–43	Pittsburgh	10–5			
1943–44	Pittsburgh	7–7			
1944–45	Pittsburgh	8–4			
1945–46	Pittsburgh	7–7			
1946–47	Pittsburgh	8–10			
1947–48	Pittsburgh	10–11			
1948–49	Pittsburgh	12–13			
1949–50	Pittsburgh	4–14			
1950–51	Pittsburgh	9–17			
1951–52	Pittsburgh	10–12			
1952–53	Pittsburgh	12–11			
Pittsburgh:		367–248 (.597)	47–20 (.701)		
Total:		367–248 (.597)			
National champion Postseason invitational champion Conference regular season champion Conference regular season and conference tournament champion Division regular season champion Division regular season and conference tournament champion Conference tournament champion

* Eastern Intercollegiate Conference championships between teams with identical records were decided by a one–game playoff in these seasons (included in conference record totals).

== See also ==
- List of NCAA Division I Men's Final Four appearances by coach
