= Lennie McMillian =

Irish-American basketball player

Lennie Lee McMillian (born 21 March 1959 in McRae, Georgia, United States) is a retired American-Irish professional basketball player. His biography on the Basketball Ireland website states: "Lennie McMillian is one of the greatest all-round American players to have played in the Irish national league after a career remarkable for its longevity and variety."

After a standout career at the University of Pittsburgh, including winning an Eastern Eight tournament MVP while helping Pitt win the 1981 conference championship, McMillian narrowly missed out on the NBA draft and opted to go overseas. McMillian decided to play professionally in Ireland at which time basketball was experiencing a boom in popularity. McMillian was recruited by Blue Demons in the autumn of 1981. He had an immediate impact in the first full season in which every Irish top-flight club had at least one American player, averaging 29 points a game. The following season McMillian joined Burgerland in the summer of 1982, and quickly emerged as one of the stars of the league. In his first season with Burgerland he led them to their first-ever national league and the prestigious Roy Curtis international tournament averaging 30 points a game along the way. McMillian was the first American to lead a team to the Top Four in each of his first four seasons; he and Bob Stephens would form one of the greatest tandems in league history to help newly-promoted North Monastery come within a whisker of winning the title.

After stints with Dublin clubs St Declan’s and UCD Marian, he’d return to the Mon a decade on from previously having played with them and duly helped them win the 1995 National Cup, the first and only time a team outside the men’s top-flight has done so.

McMillian won a total of four Irish National Cups (one with North Mon and three with Denny Notre Dame), including a cup final MVP for Notre Dame in the 1998 cup final. During that season McMillian also received the Irish Sportsman of the week award (an award given out by the Irish Independent) for his performance against Star of the Sea in the Sprite cup quarter final. He helped Notre Dame overcome a 30-point half time deficit on the way to their second cup win. He is now a basketball coach at Ongar Chasers Basketball Club and Alexandra College.

In 2023, Lennie was officially inducted into the Irish Basketball Hall of Fame.
