= Charley Hyatt =

American basketball player (1908–1978)

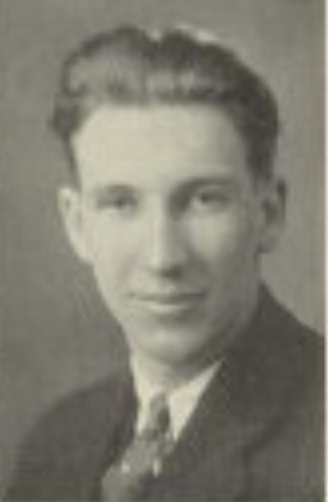
- Hyatt as a senior at Pitt

Personal information
- Born: February 28, 1908 Syracuse, New York, U.S.
- Died: May 8, 1978 (aged 70) St. Petersburg, Florida, U.S.
- Listed height: 6 ft 0 in (1.83 m)

Career information
- High school: Uniontown (Uniontown, Pennsylvania)
- College: Pittsburgh (1927–1930)
- Position: Guard

Career highlights
- Helms National Player of the Year (1930); 3× All-American (1928–1930); 5× AAU All-American (1931, 1933–1935, 1944)
- Basketball Hall of Fame
- Collegiate Basketball Hall of Fame

Charles D. Hyatt Jr. (February 28, 1908 – May 8, 1978) was an American collegiate basketball player in the late 1920s.

The Syracuse, New York, native played three seasons at University of Pittsburgh under coach Clifford Carlson (1927–30). An exceptional shooter, Hyatt scored then-outstanding 880 points throughout his college career. He was named an All-American three consecutive times, and additionally Helms Foundation Player of the Year in 1930, when he led the nation in scoring with 12.6 ppg.

After his college career, Hyatt played AAU basketball, and later coached in the Professional Basketball League of America. Hyatt was inducted into the Helms Athletic Foundation Hall of Fame, the Naismith Basketball Hall of Fame in its inaugural class in 1959, and the National Collegiate Basketball Hall of Fame in its inaugural class of 2006. In 2019, Charley Hyatt was posthumously inducted into the Pitt Athletics Hall of Fame.
