= College Basketball Experience =

Coordinates: 39°05′54″N 94°34′51″W

The College Basketball Experience and National Collegiate Basketball Hall of Fame
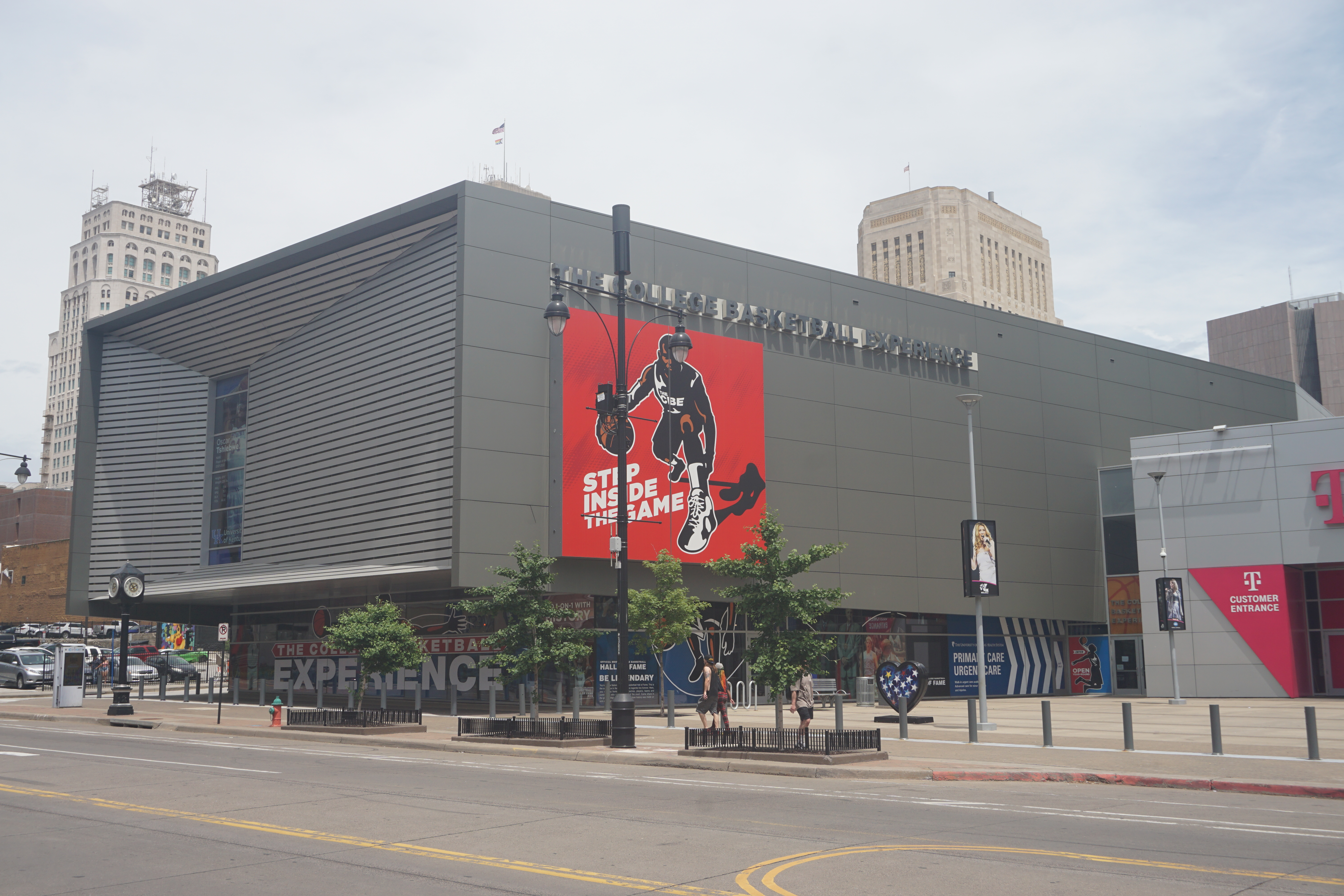
- National Collegiate Basketball Hall of Fame at The College Basketball Experience
- Established: October 10, 2007
- Location: Kansas City, Missouri
- Type: College Basketball Hall of Fame
- CEO: Kevin Henderson
- Website: Official website

The College Basketball Experience is a 41,500-square-foot (3,860 m^{2}) fan-interactive facility located downtown in Kansas City, Missouri, which includes the National Collegiate Basketball Hall of Fame. It cost $24 million to build, was opened in October 2007, and is owned and operated by the National Association of Basketball Coaches Foundation.

== The Hall of Honor ==
The Hall of Honor is a separate area, distinct from the rest of the facility. Within the hall are the Honor Theater, Mentor’s Circle and Gallery of Honor which use interactive media, iconic elements, and graphics to exhibit the greatest college coaches, players, teams and contributors in basketball.

== College Basketball Experience Classic ==
The location hosts the annual College Basketball Experience Classic tournament (formerly the Guardians Classic) and the reception for the Hall of Fame induction annually in November.
