= 1927–28 NCAA men's basketball season =

Men's collegiate basketball season

- Helms National Champions: Pittsburgh (retroactive selection in 1943)
- Player of the Year (Helms): Victor Holt, Oklahoma (retroactive selection in 1944)

The 1927–28 NCAA men's basketball season began in December 1927, progressed through the regular season and conference tournaments, and concluded in March 1928.

== Season headlines ==
- On April 9, 1927, the Joint Basketball Rules Committee announced a sudden change in dribbling rules, eliminating the continuous dribble that had become legal in the 1909–10 season and replacing it with the rule in use from the 1901–02 through 1908–09 seasons, which restricted each dribble to a single bounce. The committee made the change in the belief that elimination of the continuous dribble would make the game less rough and reward greater team play by encouraging more passing. In response, Kansas head coach Phog Allen founded the National Association of Basketball Coaches, which under his leadership sponsored a nationwide protest against the change. By May 1927, the committee had reversed its decision, and the continuous dribble remained legal.
- The Veteran Athletes of Philadelphia deemed Pittsburgh the mythical national champion of the 1927–28 season and awarded the Panthers the U. S. Senator Boies Penrose Memorial Trophy.
- After the end of the 1927–28 season, the Missouri Valley Intercollegiate Athletic Association (MVIAA) split into the Big Six Conference and the Missouri Valley Conference in May 1928. Both claimed to be a continuation of the MVIAA.
- In February 1943, the Helms Athletic Foundation retroactively selected Pittsburgh as its top-ranked team for the 1927–28 season.
- In 1995, the Premo-Porretta Power Poll retroactively selected Pittsburgh as its national champion for the 1927–28 season.

== Conference membership changes ==
School	Former conference	New conference
UCLA Bruins	Independent	Pacific Coast Conference

== Regular season ==
=== Conferences ===
==== Conference winners and tournaments ====
Conference	Regular season winner	Conference player of the year	Conference tournament	Tournament venue (City)	Tournament winner
Big Ten Conference	Indiana & Purdue	None selected	No Tournament		
Eastern Intercollegiate Basketball League	Penn	None selected	No Tournament		
Missouri Valley Intercollegiate Athletic Association	Oklahoma	None selected	No Tournament		
Pacific Coast Conference	Washington (North); USC (South)		No Tournament; USC defeated Washington in best-of-three conference championship playoff series		
Rocky Mountain Athletic Conference	Wyoming (Eastern); Montana State (Western)		No Tournament		
Southern Conference	Auburn	None selected	1928 Southern Conference men's basketball tournament	Municipal Auditorium (Atlanta, Georgia)	Mississippi
Southwest Conference	Arkansas	None selected	No Tournament		

==== Conference standings ====
1927–28 Big Ten Conference men's basketball standings
	Conf.				Overall
Team	W		L	PCT	W		L	PCT
Indiana	10	–	2	.833	15	–	2	.882
Purdue	10	–	2	.833	15	–	2	.882
Wisconsin	9	–	3	.750	13	–	4	.765
Northwestern	9	–	3	.750	12	–	5	.706
Michigan	7	–	5	.583	10	–	7	.588
Chicago	5	–	7	.417	8	–	9	.471
Iowa	3	–	9	.250	6	–	11	.353
Ohio State	3	–	9	.250	5	–	12	.294
Illinois	2	–	10	.167	5	–	12	.294
Minnesota	2	–	10	.167	4	–	12	.250

1927–28 Eastern Intercollegiate Basketball League standings
	Conf.				Overall
Team	W		L	PCT	W		L	PCT
Penn†	7	–	3	.700	22	–	5	.815
Princeton	7	–	3	.700	14	–	10	.583
Dartmouth	6	–	4	.600	19	–	8	.704
Cornell	5	–	5	.500	7	–	11	.389
Yale	3	–	7	.300	12	–	9	.571
Columbia	2	–	8	.200	4	–	13	.235
† Conference championship winner

1927–28 Missouri Valley Intercollegiate Athletic Association men's basketball standings
	Conf.				Overall
Team	W		L	PCT	W		L	PCT
Oklahoma	18	–	0	1.000	18	–	0	1.000
Missouri	13	–	5	.722	13	–	5	.722
Oklahoma A&M	11	–	7	.611	11	–	8	.579
Kansas	9	–	9	.500	9	–	9	.500
Kansas State	8	–	10	.444	10	–	10	.500
Washington University	8	–	10	.444	10	–	12	.455
Drake	7	–	11	.389	7	–	13	.350
Nebraska	7	–	11	.389	7	–	11	.389
Grinnell	6	–	12	.333	6	–	13	.316
Iowa State	3	–	15	.167	3	–	15	.167

1927–28 Pacific Coast Conference men's basketball standings
	Conf.				Overall
Team	W		L	PCT	W		L	PCT
North
Washington	9	–	1	.900	22	–	6	.786
Oregon	8	–	2	.800	18	–	3	.857
Idaho	4	–	6	.400	7	–	7	.500
Oregon State	4	–	6	.400	15	–	16	.484
Montana	4	–	6	.400	6	–	8	.429
Washington State	1	–	9	.100	7	–	17	.292
South
USC †	6	–	3	.667	22	–	4	.846
California	6	–	3	.667	9	–	6	.600
UCLA	5	–	4	.556	10	–	5	.667
Stanford	1	–	8	.111	8	–	13	.381
† Conference playoff series winner

1927–28 Rocky Mountain Conference standings
	Conf.				Overall
Team	W		L	PCT	W		L	PCT
Eastern
Wyoming	9	–	3	.750	13	–	8	.619
Colorado College	9	–	5	.643	10	–	7	.588
Denver	8	–	6	.571	10	–	6	.625
Northern Colorado	8	–	6	.571	8	–	6	.571
Colorado	5	–	7	.417	5	–	7	.417
Colorado Agricultural	5	–	7	.417	5	–	7	.417
Colorado Mines	5	–	7	.417	5	–	7	.417
Western State	1	–	9	.100	10	–	12	.455
Western
Montana State	11	–	1	.917	36	–	2	.947
Utah Agricultural	5	–	7	.417	7	–	7	.500
Utah	5	–	7	.417	7	–	10	.412
BYU	3	–	9	.250	13	–	10	.565

1927–28 Southern Conference men's basketball standings
	Conf.				Overall
Team	W		L	PCT	W		L	PCT
Auburn	12	–	1	.923	20	–	2	.909
Mississippi A&M	10	–	1	.909	13	–	7	.650
North Carolina	8	–	1	.889	17	–	2	.895
Maryland	8	–	1	.889	14	–	4	.778
Kentucky	8	–	1	.889	12	–	6	.667
LSU	7	–	3	.700	14	–	4	.778
Virginia	10	–	5	.667	20	–	6	.769
Georgia	8	–	5	.615	12	–	10	.545
VMI	5	–	5	.500	7	–	6	.538
Alabama	5	–	5	.500	10	–	10	.500
Clemson	5	–	7	.417	9	–	14	.391
South Carolina	4	–	7	.364	8	–	12	.400
Mississippi †	5	–	9	.357	10	–	9	.526
NC State	3	–	6	.333	10	–	8	.556
Vanderbilt	2	–	5	.286	5	–	7	.417
Virginia Tech	3	–	7	.300	5	–	11	.313
Washington and Lee	3	–	7	.300	5	–	12	.294
Florida	2	–	10	.167	5	–	16	.238
Sewanee	1	–	5	.167	2	–	7	.222
Tulane	3	–	15	.167	3	–	15	.167
Tennessee	0	–	8	.000	0	–	12	.000
† Southern Conference Tournament winner

1927–28 Southwest Conference men's basketball standings
	Conf.				Overall
Team	W		L	PCT	W		L	PCT
Arkansas	12	–	0	1.000	19	–	1	.950
SMU	10	–	2	.833	14	–	3	.824
Texas	7	–	5	.583	12	–	5	.706
TCU	5	–	7	.417	9	–	8	.529
Rice	3	–	9	.250	3	–	9	.250
Baylor	2	–	8	.200	8	–	10	.444
Texas A&M	1	–	9	.100	4	–	12	.250

=== Independents ===
A total of 90 college teams played as major independents. Pittsburgh (21–0) finished both undefeated and with the most wins.

1927–28 NCAA men's basketball independents standings
	Conf.				Overall
Team	W		L	PCT	W		L	PCT
Pittsburgh		–		–	21	–	0	1.000
Detroit City College		–		–	18	–	1	.947
Carleton		–		–	13	–	1	.929
Illinois Wesleyan		–		–	13	–	1	.929
Georgetown		–		–	12	–	1	.923
Springfield (Mass.)		–		–	18	–	2	.900
Xavier		–		–	9	–	1	.900
Butler		–		–	19	–	3	.864
Santa Clara		–		–	12	–	2	.857
Westminster (Pa.)		–		–	17	–	3	.850
Furman		–		–	15	–	3	.833
West Texas State		–		–	19	–	4	.826
Evansville		–		–	14	–	3	.824
Notre Dame		–		–	18	–	4	.818
St. John's (N.Y.)		–		–	18	–	4	.818
Arizona		–		–	13	–	3	.813
Miami (Ohio)		–		–	13	–	3	.813
Fordham		–		–	16	–	4	.800
Loyola (Ill.)		–		–	16	–	4	.800
Northern Arizona State		–		–	12	–	3	.800
Connecticut		–		–	11	–	3	.786
Cincinnati		–		–	14	–	4	.778
Temple		–		–	17	–	5	.773
Manhattan		–		–	13	–	4	.765
Wooster		–		–	13	–	4	.765
Bucknell		–		–	16	–	5	.762
Pittsburg State		–		–	16	–	5	.762
St. Ignatius		–		–	16	–	5	.762
Louisville		–		–	12	–	4	.750
Rhode Island State		–		–	15	–	5	.750
William & Mary		–		–	15	–	5	.750
Bradley		–		–	14	–	5	.737
CCNY		–		–	11	–	4	.733
Detroit		–		–	11	–	4	.733
Michigan State		–		–	11	–	4	.733
Valparaiso		–		–	11	–	4	.733
Navy		–		–	13	–	5	.722
The Citadel		–		–	13	–	5	.722
Indiana State		–		–	12	–	5	.706
Wichita Municipal		–		–	14	–	6	.700
Seton Hall		–		–	9	–	4	.692
Washburn		–		–	9	–	4	.692
Dayton		–		–	11	–	5	.688
Niagara		–		–	11	–	5	.688
Richmond		–		–	11	–	5	.688
Holy Cross		–		–	13	–	6	.684
Duquesne		–		–	15	–	7	.682
Tempe State		–		–	10	–	5	.667
Army		–		–	10	–	5	.667
Lehigh		–		–	10	–	5	.667
Mount Union		–		–	12	–	6	.667
Penn State		–		–	10	–	5	.667
St. Bonaventure		–		–	14	–	7	.667
West Virginia		–		–	13	–	7	.650
George Washington		–		–	11	–	6	.647
Duke		–		–	9	–	5	.643
Rutgers		–		–	9	–	5	.643
New Mexico		–		–	12	–	7	.632
Syracuse		–		–	10	–	6	.625
Canisius		–		–	8	–	5	.615
Colgate		–		–	12	–	8	.600
Lafayette		–		–	10	–	7	.588
Western Kentucky State		–		–	10	–	7	.588
New York University		–		–	8	–	6	.571
Bowling Green State		–		–	9	–	7	.563
Davidson		–		–	9	–	7	.563
Texas Tech		–		–	9	–	7	.563
Toledo		–		–	9	–	7	.563
Harvard		–		–	8	–	7	.533
Saint Francis (N.Y.)		–		–	9	–	8	.529
Western State Teachers		–		–	9	–	8	.529
Boston University		–		–	8	–	8	.500
Buffalo		–		–	8	–	8	.500
Marshall		–		–	10	–	10	.500
Ohio		–		–	10	–	10	.500
Saint Louis		–		–	11	–	11	.500
DePauw		–		–	8	–	9	.471
Saint Mary's (Calif.)		–		–	7	–	8	.467
Texas State M&M		–		–	6	–	8	.429
Brown		–		–	7	–	10	.412
Marquette		–		–	7	–	11	.389
Muhlenberg		–		–	6	–	11	.353
St. Joseph's		–		–	6	–	11	.353
Wake Forest		–		–	6	–	14	.300
DePaul		–		–	2	–	5	.286
Villanova		–		–	4	–	11	.267
Loyola (Md.)		–		–	4	–	12	.250
New Mexico A&M		–		–	3	–	11	.214
Kent State Normal		–		–	3	–	13	.188
Tulsa		–		–	2	–	12	.143

== Awards ==
=== Helms College Basketball All-Americans ===
The practice of selecting a Consensus All-American Team did not begin until the 1928–29 season. The Helms Athletic Foundation later retroactively selected a list of All-Americans for the 1927–28 season.

Helms NCAA All-Americans
Player	Team
Victor Holt	Oklahoma
Charley Hyatt	Pittsburgh
Alfred James	Washington
Stretch Murphy	Purdue
Bennie Oosterbaan	Michigan
Sykes Reed	Pittsburgh
Glen Rose	Arkansas
Joe Schaaf	Penn
Ernest Simpson	Colorado College
Cat Thompson	Montana State

=== Major player of the year awards ===
- Helms Player of the Year: Victor Holt, Oklahoma (retroactive selection in 1944)

== Coaching changes ==
A number of teams changed coaches during the season and after it ended.

Team	Former Coach	Interim Coach	New Coach	Reason
Auburn	Mike Papke		George Bohler	
BYU	E. L. Roberts		G. Ott Romney	
Cincinnati	Boyd Chambers		Frank E. Rice	
Colgate	William Reid		Lloyd Jordan	
Dartmouth	Lew Wachter		Dolly Stark	
Dayton	Harry Bujan		George Fitzgerald	
Duke	George Buchheit		Eddie Cameron	
Furman	Rock Norman		Dizzy McLeod	Norman left to coach at South Carolina.
Iowa State	Bill Chandler		Louis Menze	Chandler left to be an assistant coach at Wisconsin.
Loyola (Md.)	Pat Miller		Tony Comerford	Miller left to coach at Wake Forest.
Manhattan	Chief Muller		James Houlihan	
Michigan	E. J. Mather		George F. Veenker	
Montana State	G. Ott Romney		Schubert R. Dyche	
New Hampshire	Butch Cowell		Henry Swasey	
Oregon State	Robert Hager		Slats Gill	
Saint Joseph's	Tom Temple		Bill Ferguson	
Saint Louis	Harry Reget		Mike Nylkos	
South Carolina	A. Burnet Stoney		Rock Norman	
St. Bonaventure	Frederick V. Ostergren		Mike Reilly	
Saint Francis (N. Y.)	Nip Lynch		Edward Keating	
Texas State M&M	E. J. Stewart		Mack Saxon	
Tulane	Claude Simons Sr.		Bernie Bierman	
Virginia Tech	Bud Moore		I. E. Randall	
Washington State	Karl Schlademan		Jack Friel	Schlademan left to coach the Washington State track team.
Wake Forest	James A. Baldwin		Pat Miller	
Wichita Municipal	Leonard J. Umnus		Gene Johnson	
Wyoming	Stewart Clark		George McLaren	
Yale	George Taylor		Elmer Ripley	
