= List of Oklahoma Sooners men's basketball seasons =

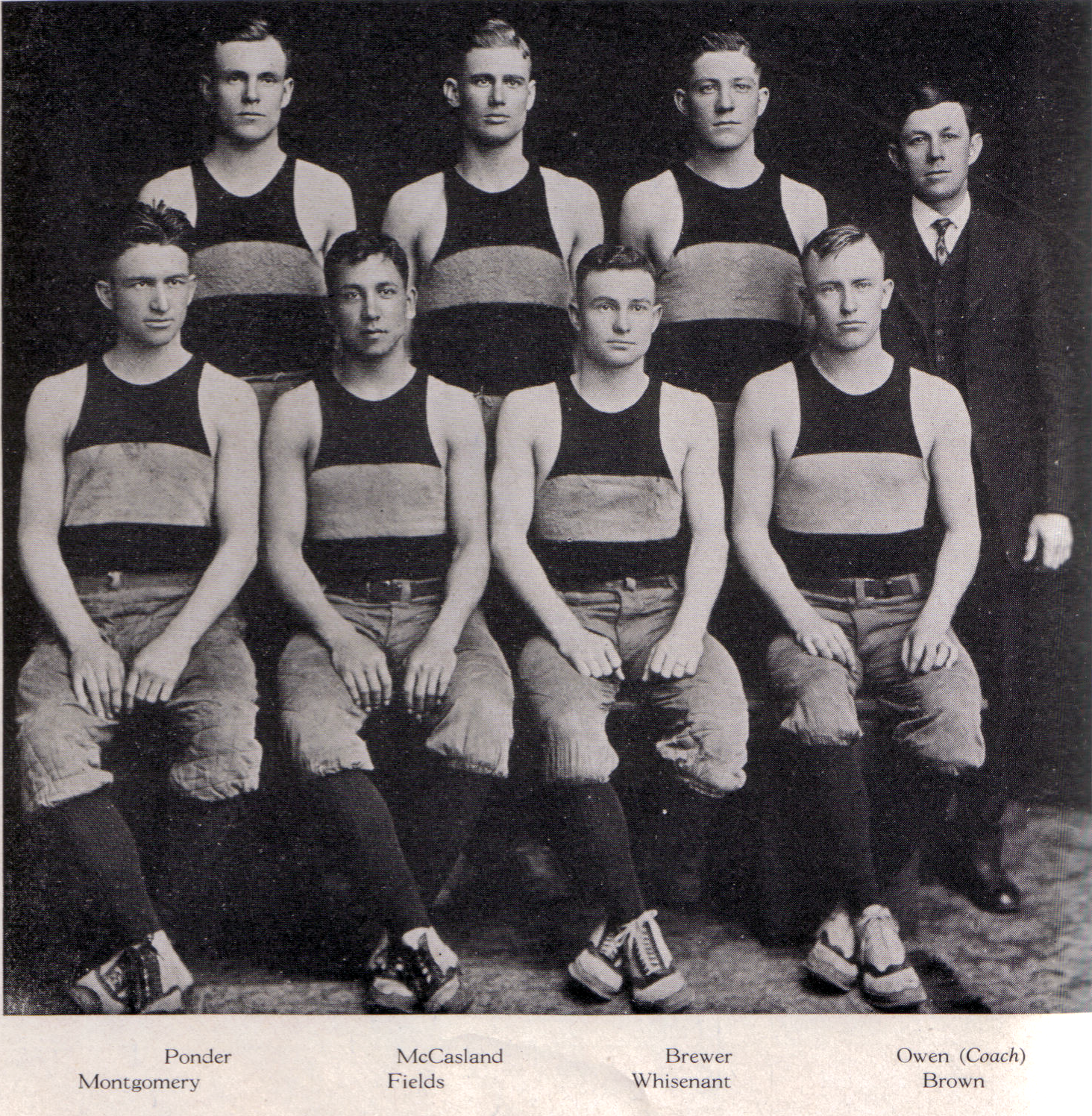
Oklahoma Sooners men's basketball team of 1915–16.

The Oklahoma Sooners college basketball team competes in the National Collegiate Athletic Association (NCAA) Division I, representing the University of Oklahoma in the Southeastern Conference. The Sooners have played their home games at the Lloyd Noble Center in Norman, Oklahoma since 1975.

== Seasons ==
National champions †	Conference champions *	Conference tournament champions ‡	Postseason berth	Shared standing T	Not applicable

Season	Head coach	Season results					Postseason results	Final ranking		Refs.
Season	Head coach	Conference			Overall		Postseason results	AP	Coaches'	Refs.
Season	Head coach	Finish	Win(s)	Loss(es)	Win(s)	Loss(es)	Postseason results	AP	Coaches'	Refs.
Oklahoma Sooners
Independent (1907–1919)
1908–09	David C. Hall				4	3				
1908–09	Bennie Owen				3	3				
1909–10	Bennie Owen				8	0				
1910–11	Bennie Owen				1	5				
1911–12	Bennie Owen				7	2				
1912–13	Bennie Owen				8	0				
1913–14	Bennie Owen				7	1				
1914–15	Bennie Owen				7	5				
1915–16	Bennie Owen				19	7				
1916–17	Bennie Owen				13	8				
1917–18	Bennie Owen				11	1				
1918–19	Bennie Owen				12	0				
Missouri Valley Intercollegiate Athletic Association (1919–1928)
1919–20	Bennie Owen	5th	3	7	9	7				
1920–21	Bennie Owen	7th	5	9	8	10				
1921–22	Hugh McDermott	T–4th	8	8	9	9				
1922–23	Hugh McDermott	T–6th	5	11	6	12				
1923–24	Hugh McDermott	2nd	13	3	15	3				
1924–25	Hugh McDermott	5th	9	7	10	8				
1925–26	Hugh McDermott	T–2nd	9	3	11	4				
1926–27	Hugh McDermott	2nd	8	4	12	5				
1927–28 *	Hugh McDermott	1st	18	0	18	0				
Big Six Conference (1928–1947)
1928–29 *	Hugh McDermott	1st	10	0	13	2				
1929–30	Hugh McDermott	6th	0	10	6	12				
1930–31	Hugh McDermott	6th	3	7	10	8				
1931–32	Hugh McDermott	T–2nd	6	4	9	5				
1932–33	Hugh McDermott	2nd	7	3	12	5				
1933–34	Hugh McDermott	T–2nd	6	4	10	8				
1934–35	Hugh McDermott	3rd	8	8	9	9				
1935–36	Hugh McDermott	3rd	5	5	9	8				
1936–37	Hugh McDermott	3rd	7	3	12	4				
1937–38	Hugh McDermott	2nd	8	2	14	4				
1938–39 *	Bruce Drake	T–1st	7	3	12	9	NCAA Final Four			
1939–40 *	Bruce Drake	T–1st	8	2	12	7				
1940–41	Bruce Drake	4th	5	5	6	12				
1941–42 *	Bruce Drake	T–1st	8	2	11	7				
1942–43	Bruce Drake	2nd	7	3	18	9	NCAA Elite Eight			
1943–44 *	Bruce Drake	T–1st	9	1	15	8				
1944–45	Bruce Drake	T–3rd	5	5	12	13				
1945–46	Bruce Drake	2nd	7	3	11	10				
1946–47 *	Bruce Drake	1st	8	2	24	7	NCAA runner-up			
Big Seven Conference (1947–1958)
1947–48	Bruce Drake	T–2nd	7	5	13	9				
1948–49 *	Bruce Drake	T–1st	9	3	14	10				
1949–50	Bruce Drake	T–4th	6	6	12	10				
1950–51	Bruce Drake	4th	6	6	14	10				
1951–52	Bruce Drake	T–4th	4	8	7	17				
1952–53	Bruce Drake	T–4th	5	7	8	13				
1953–54	Bruce Drake	6th	4	8	8	13				
1954–55	Bruce Drake	7th	1	11	3	18				
1955–56	Doyle Parrack	7th	1	11	4	19				
1956–57	Doyle Parrack	7th	3	9	8	15				
1957–58	Doyle Parrack	T–4th	5	7	13	10				
Big Eight Conference (1958–1996)
1958–59	Doyle Parrack	2nd	9	5	15	10				
1959–60	Doyle Parrack	3rd	9	5	14	11				
1960–61	Doyle Parrack	7th	2	12	10	15				
1961–62	Doyle Parrack	T–5th	5	9	7	17				
1962–63	Bob Stevens	T–3rd	8	6	12	13				
1963–64	Bob Stevens	8th	3	11	7	18				
1964–65	Bob Stevens	8th	3	11	8	17				
1965–66	Bob Stevens	4th	7	7	11	14				
1966–67	Bob Stevens	6th	5	9	8	17				
1967–68	John MacLeod	T–3rd	8	6	13	13				
1968–69	John MacLeod	8th	3	11	7	19				
1969–70	John MacLeod	T–3rd	7	7	19	9	NIT Quarterfinal			
1970–71	John MacLeod	T–2nd	9	5	19	8	NIT first round			
1971–72	John MacLeod	3rd	9	5	14	12				
1972–73	John MacLeod	4th	8	6	18	8				
1973–74	Joe Ramsey	3rd	9	5	18	8				
1974–75	Joe Ramsey	5th	6	8	13	13				
1975–76	Dave Bliss	T–4th	6	8	9	17				
1976–77	Dave Bliss	T–3rd	9	5	18	10				
1977–78	Dave Bliss	T–4th	7	7	14	13				
1978–79 *	Dave Bliss	1st‡	10	4	21	10	NCAA Division I Sweet Sixteen	16		
1979–80	Dave Bliss	6th	6	8	15	12				
1980–81	Billy Tubbs	7th	4	10	9	18				
1981–82	Billy Tubbs	3rd	8	6	22	11	NIT semifinal			
1982–83	Billy Tubbs	2nd	10	4	24	9	NCAA Division I second round			
1983–84 *	Billy Tubbs	1st	13	1	29	5	NCAA Division I second round	7	8	
1984–85 *	Billy Tubbs	1st ‡	13	1	31	6	NCAA Division I Elite Eight	4	5	
1985–86	Billy Tubbs	T–3rd	8	6	26	9	NCAA Division I second round	15	17	
1986–87	Billy Tubbs	2nd	9	5	24	10	NCAA Division I Sweet Sixteen		20	
1987–88 *	Billy Tubbs	1st	12	2	35	4	NCAA Division I runner-up	4	3	
1988–89 *	Billy Tubbs	1st	12	2	30	6	NCAA Division I Sweet Sixteen	4	5	
1989–90	Billy Tubbs	T–2nd‡	11	3	27	5	NCAA Division I second round	1	1	
1990–91	Billy Tubbs	T–6th	5	9	20	15	NIT runner-up			
1991–92	Billy Tubbs	T–2nd	8	6	21	9	NCAA Division I first round	23	24	
1992–93	Billy Tubbs	T–5th	7	7	20	12	NIT second round			
1993–94	Billy Tubbs	5th	6	8	15	13	NIT first round			
1994–95	Kelvin Sampson	3rd	9	5	23	9	NCAA Division I first round	17		
1995–96	Kelvin Sampson	3rd	8	6	18	12	NCAA Division I first round			
Big 12 Conference (1996–2024)
1996–97	Kelvin Sampson	6th	9	7	19	11	NCAA Division I first round			
1997–98	Kelvin Sampson	T–2nd	11	5	22	11	NCAA Division I first round			
1998–99	Kelvin Sampson	T–2nd	11	5	22	11	NCAA Division I Sweet Sixteen		19	
1999–2000	Kelvin Sampson	T–3rd‡	12	4	27	7	NCAA Division I second round	12	19	
2000–01	Kelvin Sampson	T–2nd‡	12	4	26	7	NCAA Division I first round	13	19	
2001–02	Kelvin Sampson	2nd‡	13	3	31	5	NCAA Division I Final Four	3	4	
2002–03	Kelvin Sampson	3rd	12	4	27	7	NCAA Division I Elite Eight	3	7	
2003–04	Kelvin Sampson	7th	8	8	20	11	NIT second round			
2004–05 *	Kelvin Sampson	T–1st	12	4	25	8	NCAA Division I second round	17	19	
2005–06	Kelvin Sampson	3rd	11	5	20	9	NCAA Division I first round	24		
2006–07	Jeff Capel	T–7th	6	10	16	15				
2007–08	Jeff Capel	T–4th	9	7	23	12	NCAA Division I second round			
2008–09	Jeff Capel	2nd	13	3	30	6	NCAA Division I Elite Eight	6	7	
2009–10	Jeff Capel	T–11th	4	12	13	18				^{[Note A]}
2010–11	Jeff Capel	8th	5	11	14	18				
2011–12	Lon Kruger	8th	5	13	15	16				
2012–13	Lon Kruger	4th	11	7	20	12	NCAA Division I first round			
2013–14	Lon Kruger	2nd	12	6	23	10	NCAA Division I round of 64	21		
2014–15	Lon Kruger	T–2nd	12	6	24	11	NCAA Division I Sweet Sixteen	13	13	
2015–16	Lon Kruger	3rd	12	6	29	8	NCAA Division I Final Four	7	4	
2016–17	Lon Kruger	9th	5	13	11	20				
2017–18	Lon Kruger	T–8th	8	10	18	14	NCAA Division I first round			
2018–19	Lon Kruger	T–7th	7	11	20	14	NCAA Division I second round			
2019–20	Lon Kruger	T–3rd	9	9	19	12	No postseason held			
2020–21	Lon Kruger	T–6th	9	8	16	11	NCAA Division I second round			
2021–22	Porter Moser	T–7th	7	11	19	16	NIT second round			
2022–23	Porter Moser	T–9th	5	13	15	17				
2023–24	Porter Moser	T–9th	8	10	20	12				
Southeastern Conference (2024–present)
2024–25	Porter Moser	T–13th	6	12	20	14	NCAA Division I first round			
2025-26	Porter Moser	T–11th	7	11	21	16	College Basketball Crown Finals			

^A. Oklahoma vacated 13 regular season wins (and 4 conference wins) due to use of an ineligible player during the 2009–10 season.
