= 1928 College Basketball All-Southern Team =

The 1928 College Basketball All-Southern Team consisted of basketball players from the South chosen at their respective positions.

== All-Southerns ==
=== Guards ===
- Ary Phillips, Ole Miss
- Dewitt Laird, Ole Miss

=== Forwards ===
- Cary Phillips, Ole Miss
- Jelly Akin, Auburn

=== Center ===
- Frank Dubose, Auburn

== Key ==
- Picked by four members of the Atlanta Journal staff.
