= 1927–28 Kansas Jayhawks men's basketball team =

American college basketball season

1927–28 Kansas Jayhawks men's basketball
- Conference: Missouri Valley Intercollegiate Athletic Association
- Record: 9–9 (9–9 MVIAA)
- Head coach: Phog Allen (11th season)
- Assistant coach: John Bunn (7th season)
- Captains: Glenn Burton; James Hill
- Home arena: Hoch Auditorium

1927–28 Missouri Valley Intercollegiate Athletic Association men's basketball standings
	Conf.				Overall
Team	W		L	PCT	W		L	PCT
Oklahoma	18	–	0	1.000	18	–	0	1.000
Missouri	13	–	5	.722	13	–	5	.722
Oklahoma A&M	11	–	7	.611	11	–	8	.579
Kansas	9	–	9	.500	9	–	9	.500
Kansas State	8	–	10	.444	10	–	10	.500
Washington University	8	–	10	.444	10	–	12	.455
Drake	7	–	11	.389	7	–	13	.350
Nebraska	7	–	11	.389	7	–	11	.389
Grinnell	6	–	12	.333	6	–	13	.316
Iowa State	3	–	15	.167	3	–	15	.167

The 1927–28 Kansas Jayhawks men's basketball team represented the University of Kansas during the 1927–28 college men's basketball season.

== Roster ==
- Glenn Burton
- Leo Dodd
- Harold Hauser
- James Hill
- Balfour Jeffrey
- Robert Maney
- Clarence McGuire
- Carmen Newland
- Russell Thomson

== Schedule ==
Date time, TV	Rank^{#}	Opponent^{#}	Result	Record	Site city, state
December 16		Kansas State; Sunflower Showdown	L 13–20	0-1 (0-1)	Robinson Gymnasium; Lawrence, KS
January 6		Washington University (MO)	W 29–26	1-1 (1-1)	Hoch Auditorium; Lawrence, KS
January 10		Missouri; Border War	L 22–30	1-2 (1-2)	Hoch Auditorium; Lawrence, KS
January 13*		at Oklahoma	L 19–45	1-3 (1-3)	Field House; Norman, OK
January 14		at Oklahoma A&M	W 34–31	2-3 (2-3)	Armory-Gymnasium; Stillwater, OK
January 19		Iowa State	W 46–33	3-3 (3-3)	Hoch Auditorium; Lawrence, KS
January 27		at Washington University (MO)	L 28–35	3-4 (3-4)	Francis Gymnasium; St. Louis, MO
February 2		at Grinnell	W 36–27	4-4 (4-4)	Grinnell, IA
February 3		at Iowa State	W 21–19	5-4 (5-4)	State Gymnasium; Ames, IA
February 4		at Drake	W 28–27	6-4 (6-4)	Drake Fieldhouse; Des Moines, IA
February 9		Drake	L 28–40	6-5 (6-5)	Hoch Auditorium; Lawrence, KS
February 14		Oklahoma	L 21–30	6-6 (6-6)	Hoch Auditorium; Lawrence, KS
February 17		Nebraska	W 33–27	7-6 (7-6)	Hoch Auditorium; Lawrence, KS
February 18		Grinnell	W 42–21	8-6 (8-6)	Hoch Auditorium; Lawrence, KS
February 21		at Missouri; Border War	L 29–49	8-7 (8-7)	Rothwell Gymnasium; Columbia, MO
February 24		at Nebraska	L 28–32	8-8 (8-8)	Nebraska Coliseum; Lincoln, Nebraska
February 27		Oklahoma A&M	W 46–44	9-8 (9-8)	Hoch Auditorium; Lawrence, KS
March 7		at Kansas State; Sunflower Showdown	L 30–40	9-9 (9-9)	Nichols Hall; Manhattan, KS
*Non-conference game. ^{#}Rankings from AP Poll. (#) Tournament seedings in parentheses.
