= 1927–28 Iowa State Cyclones men's basketball team =

American college basketball season

1927–28 Iowa State Cyclones men's basketball
- Conference: Missouri Valley Intercollegiate Athletic Association
- Record: 3–15 (3–15 MVIAA)
- Head coach: Bill Chandler (7th season)
- Home arena: State Gymnasium

1927–28 Missouri Valley Intercollegiate Athletic Association men's basketball standings
	Conf.				Overall
Team	W		L	PCT	W		L	PCT
Oklahoma	18	–	0	1.000	18	–	0	1.000
Missouri	13	–	5	.722	13	–	5	.722
Oklahoma A&M	11	–	7	.611	11	–	8	.579
Kansas	9	–	9	.500	9	–	9	.500
Kansas State	8	–	10	.444	10	–	10	.500
Washington University	8	–	10	.444	10	–	12	.455
Drake	7	–	11	.389	7	–	13	.350
Nebraska	7	–	11	.389	7	–	11	.389
Grinnell	6	–	12	.333	6	–	13	.316
Iowa State	3	–	15	.167	3	–	15	.167

The 1927–28 Iowa State Cyclones men's basketball team (also known informally as Ames) represented Iowa State University during the 1927–28 NCAA men's basketball season. The Cyclones were coached by Bill Chandler, who was in his seventh and final season with the Cyclones. They played their home games at the State Gymnasium in Ames, Iowa.

They finished the season 3–15, 3–15 in Missouri Valley play to finish in tenth place.

== Roster ==
1927–28 Iowa State Cyclones men's basketball team
Players
Coaches

Pos.	#	Name	Height	Weight	Year	Hometown
C		G.H. Ayres	—	—	Sr	Sioux Falls, South Dakota
F		Stanley Brown	—	—	Sr
G		Laurence Coomer	—	—	Jr
		Glasscock	—	—
G		Freddy Kling	—	—	Sr
G		C.W. Klingaman	—	—	So
G		R.W. Lamson	—	—	Sr
F		Lester Lande	—	—	Jr	Northwood, Iowa
F		Fred Ludwig	—	—	Jr	Lawton, Iowa
F		H.M. Pohlman	—	—	So	Melvin, Iowa
C		Lee Stillman	—	—	So	Gowrie, Iowa
F		Max Stayer (C)	—	—	Sr
G		M.H. Taylor	—	—	Jr	Montezuma, Iowa
C		R.M. Treadwell	—	—	Sr
C		Glenn Woods	6 ft 0 in (1.83 m)	—	So	Irwin, Iowa

Head coach

- Bill Chandler

Assistant coach(es)

Legend

- (C) Team captain
- (S) Suspended
- (I) Ineligible
- (W) Walk-on
- Injured
- Current redshirt

== Schedule and results ==
Date time, TV	Rank^{#}	Opponent^{#}	Result	Record	Site city, state
Regular season
January 5, 1928		Oklahoma	L 32–51	0–1 (0–1)	State Gymnasium; Ames, Iowa
January 7, 1928		Oklahoma A&M	L 41–42 ^{OT}	0–2 (0–2)	State Gymnasium; Ames, Iowa
January 13, 1928		at Washington University (MO)	W 41–35	1–2 (1–2)	Francis Gymnasium (3,000); St. Louis, Missouri
January 14, 1928		at Missouri	L 28–52	1–3 (1–3)	Rothwell Gymnasium; Columbia, Missouri
January 18, 1928		at Kansas State	L 28–38	1–4 (1–4)	Nichols Hall; Manhattan, Kansas
January 19, 1928		at Kansas	L 33–46	1–5 (1–5)	Hoch Auditorium; Lawrence, Kansas
January 24, 1928		Drake; Iowa Big Four	L 21–26	1–6 (1–6)	State Gymnasium; Ames, Iowa
January 28, 1928		at Nebraska	L 26–37	1–7 (1–7)	Nebraska Coliseum; Lincoln, Nebraska
January 30, 1928		Grinnell	L 30–38	1–8 (1–8)	State Gymnasium; Ames, Iowa
February 3, 1928		Kansas	L 19–21	1–9 (1–9)	State Gymnasium; Ames, Iowa
February 9, 1928		Nebraska	L 26–32	1–10 (1–10)	State Gymnasium; Ames, Iowa
February 10, 1928		Kansas State	W 39–38	2–10 (2–10)	State Gymnasium; Ames, Iowa
February 13, 1928		at Grinnell	L 25–33	2–11 (2–11)	Grinnell, Iowa
February 17, 1928		at Oklahoma A&M	L 43–54	2–12 (2–12)	Armory-Gymnasium; Stillwater, Oklahoma
February 18, 1928		at Oklahoma	L 17–37	2–13 (2–13)	OU Field House; Norman, Oklahoma
February 25, 1928		Missouri	L 30–42	2–14 (2–14)	State Gymnasium; Ames, Iowa
February 27, 1928		Washington University (MO)	L 31–36	2–15 (2–15)	State Gymnasium; Ames, Iowa
March 5, 1928; 8:00 pm		at Drake; Iowa Big Four	W 26–25	3–15 (3–15)	Drake Fieldhouse; Des Moines, Iowa
*Non-conference game. ^{#}Rankings from AP poll. (#) Tournament seedings in parentheses. All times are in Central Time.
