= List of Auburn Tigers men's basketball head coaches =

The following is a list of Auburn Tigers men's basketball head coaches. The Tigers have had 21 coaches in their 117-season history.

Tenure	Coach	Years	Record	Pct.
1905–21	Mike Donahue	16	74–80–1	.481
1921–24	Wilbur Hutsell	3	16–22	.421
1924–25	Herb Bunker	1	3–11	.214
1925–28	Mike Papke	3	38–18	.679
1928–29	George Bohler	1	6–15	.286
1929–30	Hal Lee	1	1–10	.091
1930–33	Sam J. McAllister	3	24–18	.571
1933–42, 1945–46	Ralph "Shug" Jordan	10	95–75	.559
1942–43, 1944–45	Bob Evans	2	4–28	.125
1946–47	V. J. Edney	1	3–18	.143
1947–49	Danny Doyle	2	21–25	.457
1949–63	Joel Eaves	14	213–100	.681
1963–73	Bill Lynn	10	130–124	.512
1973–78	Bob Davis	5	70–61	.534
1978–89	Sonny Smith	11	173–154	.529
1989–94	Tommy Joe Eagles	5	64–78	.451
1994–2004	Cliff Ellis	10	186–125	.598
2004–10	Jeff Lebo	6	96–93	.508
2010–14	Tony Barbee	4	49–75	.395
2014–2025	Bruce Pearl	11	246–125	.661
2025–Present	Steven Pearl	0	17-16	1.000
Totals	21 coaches	117 seasons	1,505–1,255–1	.540
