= 1927–28 Georgia Bulldogs basketball team =

American college basketball team season

1927–28 Georgia Bulldogs basketball
- Conference: Southern Conference
- Record: 12–10 (8–5 SoCon)
- Head coach: Herman Stegeman (9th season)
- Captain: George Florence
- Home arena: Woodruff Hall

1927–28 Southern Conference men's basketball standings
	Conf.				Overall
Team	W		L	PCT	W		L	PCT
Auburn	12	–	1	.923	20	–	2	.909
Mississippi A&M	10	–	1	.909	13	–	7	.650
North Carolina	8	–	1	.889	17	–	2	.895
Maryland	8	–	1	.889	14	–	4	.778
Kentucky	8	–	1	.889	12	–	6	.667
LSU	7	–	3	.700	14	–	4	.778
Virginia	10	–	5	.667	20	–	6	.769
Georgia	8	–	5	.615	12	–	10	.545
VMI	5	–	5	.500	7	–	6	.538
Alabama	5	–	5	.500	10	–	10	.500
Clemson	5	–	7	.417	9	–	14	.391
South Carolina	4	–	7	.364	8	–	12	.400
Mississippi †	5	–	9	.357	10	–	9	.526
NC State	3	–	6	.333	10	–	8	.556
Vanderbilt	2	–	5	.286	5	–	7	.417
Virginia Tech	3	–	7	.300	5	–	11	.313
Washington and Lee	3	–	7	.300	5	–	12	.294
Florida	2	–	10	.167	5	–	16	.238
Sewanee	1	–	5	.167	2	–	7	.222
Tulane	3	–	15	.167	3	–	15	.167
Tennessee	0	–	8	.000	0	–	12	.000
† Southern Conference Tournament winner

The 1927–28 Georgia Bulldogs basketball team represented the University of Georgia as a member of the Southern Conference (SoCon) during the 1927–28 NCAA men's basketball season. Led by ninth-year head coach Herman Stegeman, the Bulldogs compiled an overall record of 12–10 with a mark of 8–5 in conference play, placing eighth in the SoCon. The team captain was George Florence.

== Roster ==
1927–28 Georgia Bulldogs men's basketball team
Players
Coaches

Pos.	#	Name	Height	Weight	Year	Previous school	Hometown
		Henry Palmer	—	—
		George Keen	—	—
		George Florence	—	—
		Roy Drew	—	—
		Joe Martin	—	—
		Glenn Luutzenhizer	—	—

Head coach

Herman Stegeman

Assistant coach(es)

Legend

- (C) Team captain
- (S) Suspended
- (I) Ineligible
- (W) Walk-on
- Injured
- Current redshirt

== Schedule ==
Date time, TV	Opponent	Result	Record	Site city, state
12/10/1927	Southern Bell	W 50-17	1–0	
12/18/1927	Gulf Ref. Co.	L 16-30	1–1	
12/22/1927	Augusta YMCA	W 69-20	2–1	
1/4/1928	Furman	W 46-23	3–1	
1/6/1928	at Florida	W 37-35	4–1	
1/7/1928	at Florida	W 40-30	5–1	
1/11/1928	Tulane	W 42-32	6–1	
1/12/1928	Tulane	W 28-18	7–1	
1/14/1928	at Ga. Tech	W 33-30	8–1	
1/20/1928	at North Carolina	L 29-35	8–2	
1/21/1928	at Duke	L 44-49	8–3	
1/22/1928	at N.C. State	W 38-31	9–3	
1/28/1928	Ga. Tech	L 35-36	9–4	
2/3/1928	at Auburn	L 25-28	9–5	
2/4/1928	at A.A.C.	L 29-35	9–6	
2/6/1928	Clemson	W 38-25	10–6	
2/11/1928	A.A.C.	L 28-38	10–7	
2/13/1928	Ole Miss	L 37-44	10–8	
2/14/1928	Ole Miss	W 37-33	11–8	
2/18/1928	at Ga. Tech	L 26-28	11–9	
2/24/1928	V.M.I.	W 37-26	12–9	
2/25/1928	Kentucky	L 16-31	12–10	
*Non-conference game. (#) Tournament seedings in parentheses.
