= 1927–28 Michigan Wolverines men's basketball team =

American college basketball season

1927–28 Michigan Wolverines men's basketball
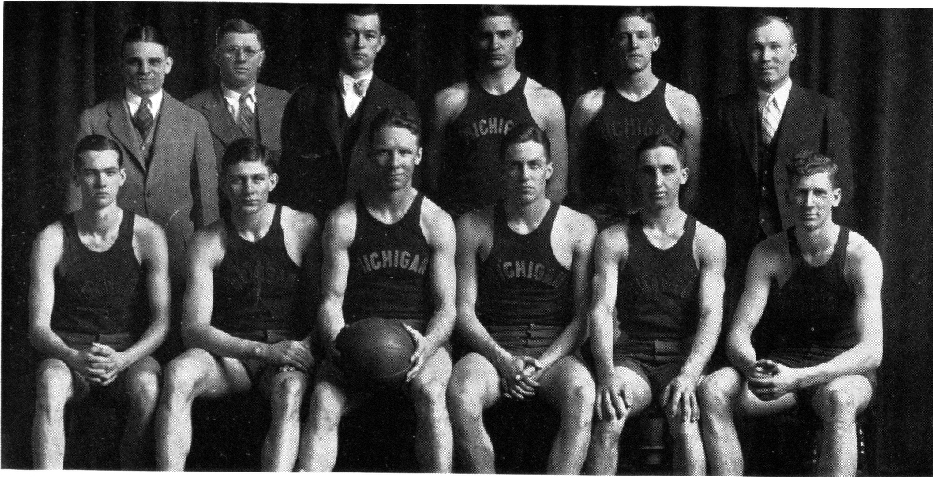
- Conference: Big Ten Conference
- Record: 10–7 (7–5 Big Nine)
- Head coach: E. J. Mather
- Assistant coaches: Harry Kipke; George F. Veenker; Ray Fisher (Freshman Coach)
- Captain: Frank Harrigan
- Home arena: Yost Field House

1927–28 Big Ten Conference men's basketball standings
	Conf.				Overall
Team	W		L	PCT	W		L	PCT
Indiana	10	–	2	.833	15	–	2	.882
Purdue	10	–	2	.833	15	–	2	.882
Wisconsin	9	–	3	.750	13	–	4	.765
Northwestern	9	–	3	.750	12	–	5	.706
Michigan	7	–	5	.583	10	–	7	.588
Chicago	5	–	7	.417	8	–	9	.471
Iowa	3	–	9	.250	6	–	11	.353
Ohio State	3	–	9	.250	5	–	12	.294
Illinois	2	–	10	.167	5	–	12	.294
Minnesota	2	–	10	.167	4	–	12	.250

The 1927–28 Michigan Wolverines men's basketball team represented the University of Michigan in intercollegiate basketball during the 1927–28 season. The team played its home games at Yost Field House on the school's campus in Ann Arbor, Michigan. The team finished fifth in the Western Conference. This was E. J. Mather's final season as head coach. Frank Harrigan served as team captain and the second highest scorer with 104 points in 17 games. Bennie Oosterbaan was the Western Conference scoring champion with 129 points in conference games. Oosterbaan had 172 points in 16 overall games, an average of 10.8 points per game, and was selected as a first-team 1928 All-American in basketball.

== Schedule ==
Date	Opponent	Score	Result	Location
December 10, 1927	Michigan State	43–23	Win	Yost Field House, Ann Arbor, MI
December 15, 1927	Pittsburgh	49–39	Loss	Yost Field House, Ann Arbor, MI
December 21, 1927	Pennsylvania	39–36	Loss	Philadelphia, PA
January 3, 1928	Bradley	46–30	Win	Yost Field House, Ann Arbor, MI
January 7, 1928	Northwestern	25–20	Loss	Evanston, IL
January 9, 1928	Wisconsin	26–22	Loss	Madison, WI
January 14, 1928	Indiana	42–41	Win	Yost Field House, Ann Arbor, MI
January 16, 1928	Ohio State	41–21	Win	Yost Field House, Ann Arbor, MI
February 4, 1928	Chicago	28–19	Win	Bartlett Gymnasium, Chicago, IL
February 6, 1928	Coe	31–25	Win	Yost Field House, Ann Arbor, MI
February 11, 1928	Purdue	35–26	Loss	Yost Field House, Ann Arbor, MI
February 13, 1928	Chicago	26–23	Win	Yost Field House, Ann Arbor, MI
February 20, 1928	Purdue	55–33	Loss	Lafayette, IN
February 25, 1928	Northwestern	47–25	Win	Yost Field House, Ann Arbor, MI
February 27, 1928	Ohio State	45–39	Win	Columbus, OH
March 3, 1928	Indiana	36–34	Loss	Bloomington, IN
March 5, 1928	Wisconsin	42–19	Win	Yost Field House, Ann Arbor, MI

== Scoring statistics ==
Player	Games	Field goals	Free throws	Points	Points per game
Bennie Oosterbaan	16	77	18	172	10.8
Frank Harrigan	17	43	18	104	6.1
Ernest McCoy	17	29	16	74	4.4
James Orwig	8	26	11	63	7.9
Robert Chapman	16	22	10	54	3.4
Fenton Raber	10	23	5	51	5.1
Daniel Rose	12	19	6	44	3.7
Samuel Gawne	10	10	2	22	2.2
Albert Barley	2	4	1	9	4.5
Tharel Kanitz	2	2	1	5	2.5
Joseph Balsamo	2	1	0	2	1.0
Herman Nyland	4	0	1	1	0.3
