= Hugh McDermott (basketball) =

American basketball coach (1893–1978)

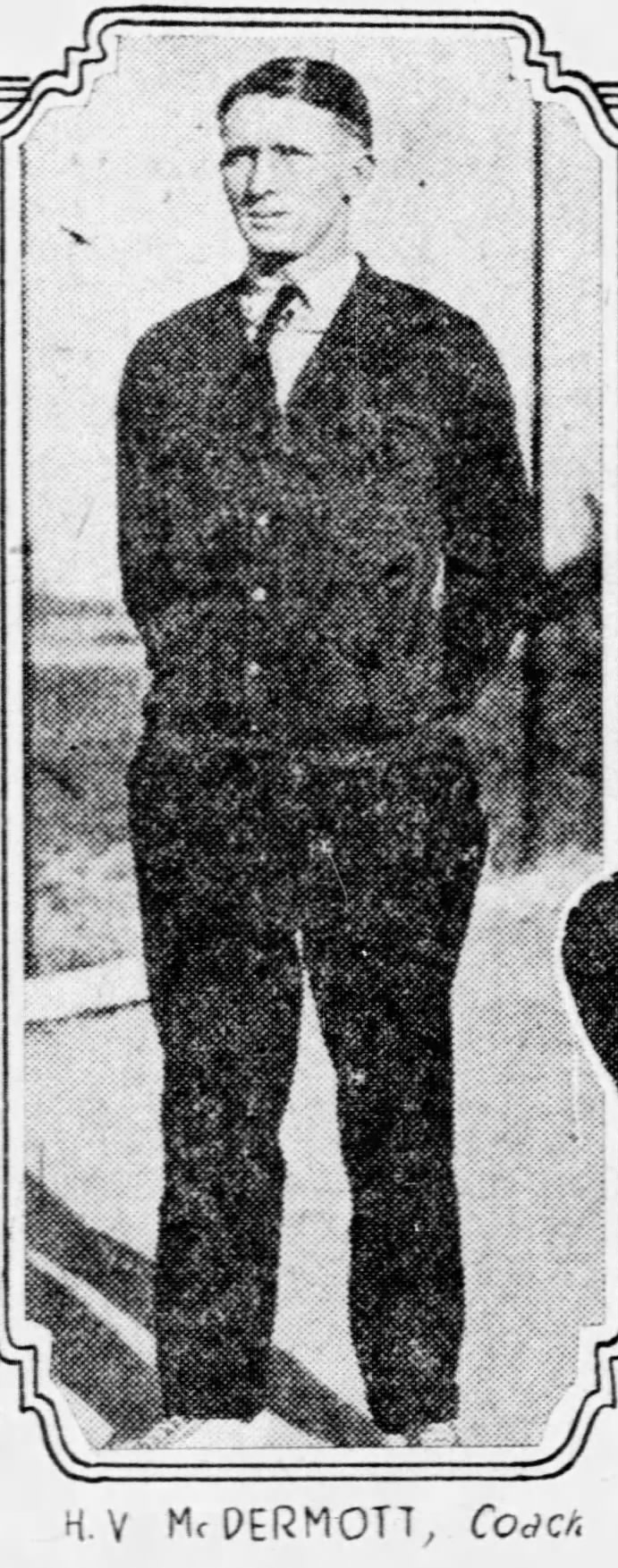
- McDermott during the 1923-24 season.

Biographical details
- Born: November 19, 1893
- Died: July 29, 1978 (aged 84); Norman, Oklahoma, U.S.

Playing career
- 1917–1920: Oklahoma

Coaching career (HC unless noted)
- 1921–1938: Oklahoma

Head coaching record
- Overall: 185–106 (.636)

Accomplishments and honors

Championships
- 1 (MVIAA), 1 (Big Six)

Hugh Virgil McDermott (November 19, 1893 – July 29, 1978) was the head basketball coach at the University of Oklahoma from 1922 to 1938. During his tenure, he compiled a record of 185-106. He also won the Missouri Valley Conference title and Big Eight Conference title.

Prior to his coaching days, McDermott was also a star player for Oklahoma while in college. In 1918, he was the captain of the football team. After resigning, McDermott took a job as head of the University's Physical Education Department.

== Head coaching record ==
Record table
Season	Team	Overall	Conference	Standing	Postseason
Oklahoma Sooners (Missouri Valley Intercollegiate Athletic Association) (1921–1928)
1921–22	Oklahoma	9–9	8–8	T–4th	
1922–23	Oklahoma	6–12	5–11	T–6th	
1923–24	Oklahoma	15–3	13–3	2nd	
1924–25	Oklahoma	10–8	9–7	5th	
1925–26	Oklahoma	11–4	9–3	T–2nd	
1926–27	Oklahoma	12–5	8–4	2nd	
1927–28	Oklahoma	18–0	18–0	1st	
Oklahoma Sooners (Big Six Conference) (1928–1938)
1928–29	Oklahoma	13–2	10–0	1st	
1929–30	Oklahoma	6–12	0–10	6th	
1930–31	Oklahoma	10–8	3–7	6th	
1931–32	Oklahoma	9–5	6–4	T–2nd	
1932–33	Oklahoma	12–5	7–3	2nd	
1933–34	Oklahoma	10–8	6–4	T–2nd	
1934–35	Oklahoma	9–9	8–8	3rd	
1935–36	Oklahoma	9–8	5–5	3rd	
1936–37	Oklahoma	12–4	7–3	3rd	
1937–38	Oklahoma	14–4	8–2	2nd	
Oklahoma:		185–106 (.636)	.613		
Total:		185–106 (.636)			
National champion Postseason invitational champion Conference regular season champion Conference regular season and conference tournament champion Division regular season champion Division regular season and conference tournament champion Conference tournament champion
