= 1927–28 UCLA Bruins men's basketball team =

American college basketball season

1927–28 UCLA Bruins men's basketball
- Conference: Pacific Coast Conference
- Record: 10–5 (5–4 PCC)
- Head coach: Caddy Works (7th season)
- Assistant coaches: Silas Gibbs; Wilbur Johns

1927–28 Pacific Coast Conference men's basketball standings
	Conf.				Overall
Team	W		L	PCT	W		L	PCT
North
Washington	9	–	1	.900	22	–	6	.786
Oregon	8	–	2	.800	18	–	3	.857
Idaho	4	–	6	.400	7	–	7	.500
Oregon State	4	–	6	.400	15	–	16	.484
Montana	4	–	6	.400	6	–	8	.429
Washington State	1	–	9	.100	7	–	17	.292
South
USC †	6	–	3	.667	22	–	4	.846
California	6	–	3	.667	9	–	6	.600
UCLA	5	–	4	.556	10	–	5	.667
Stanford	1	–	8	.111	8	–	13	.381
† Conference playoff series winner

The 1927–28 UCLA Bruins men's basketball team represented the University of California, Los Angeles during the 1927–28 NCAA men's basketball season and were members of the Pacific Coast Conference. The Bruins were led by seventh year head coach Caddy Works. They finished the regular season with a record of 10–5 and were third in the southern division with a record of 5–4.

== Previous season ==
The Grizzlies finished the season 12–4 overall and were SCIAC champions with a record of 9–1. In 1927, the Regents of the University of California changed the name of the Southern Branch of the University of California to the University of California at Los Angeles.

== Roster ==
1927–28 UCLA Bruins men's basketball team
Players
Coaches

Pos.	#	Name	Height	Weight	Year	Hometown
G		Bab Baker	—	—
G		Sam Balter	—	—
F		Jack Ketchum (C)	—	—	Sr
G		Harold Smith	—	—
G		Al Sunseri	—	—
F		Larry Wilds	—	—
F		Arthur Williams	—	—	Sr
C		William Woodroof	—	—
G		Milo Young	—	—

Head coach

Caddy Works

Assistant coach(es)

- Silas Gibbs (UCLA)
- Wilbur Johns (UCLA)

Legend

- (C) Team captain
- (S) Suspended
- (I) Ineligible
- (W) Walk-on
- Injured
- Current redshirt

Roster
Last update: 30 January 2018

== Schedule ==
Date time, TV	Rank^{#}	Opponent^{#}	Result	Record	Site city, state
Regular Season
December 7, 1927*		at Caltech	W 52–16	1–0	McKinley Junior High School; Pasadena, CA
December 16, 1927*		Pomona	W 53–32	2–0	USC Gym; Los Angeles, CA
December 20, 1927*		at Hollywood Athletic Club	W 37–28	3–0	Hollywood Athletic Club; Hollywood, CA
December 23, 1927*		at Pacific Coast Club	W 17–12	4–0	Pacific Coast Club; Long Beach, CA
December 30, 1927*		at Los Angeles Athletic Club	L 21–26	4–1	Los Angeles Athletic Club; Los Angeles, CA
January 4, 1928*		at Pomona	W 70–10	5–1	Pomona College Gym; Claremont, CA
January 12, 1928		at Stanford	W 29–22	6–1 (1–0)	Stanford Pavilion; Stanford, CA
January 13, 1928		at Stanford	W 28–22	7–1 (2–0)	Stanford Pavilion; Stanford, CA
January 21, 1928		Stanford	L 27–34	7–2 (2–1)	Olympic Auditorium; Los Angeles, CA
February 3, 1928		California	L 34–35	7–3 (2–2)	Olympic Auditorium; Los Angeles, CA
February 4, 1928		California	W 48–36	8–3 (3–2)	Olympic Auditorium; Los Angeles, CA
February 11, 1928		at California	L 26–33	8–4 (3–3)	Oakland Auditorium; Oakland, CA
February 18, 1928		vs. USC	L 35–45	8–5 (3–4)	Olympic Auditorium; Los Angeles, CA
February 22, 1928		vs. USC	W 34–27	9–5 (4–4)	Olympic Auditorium; Los Angeles, CA
February 25, 1928		vs. USC	W 47–37	10–5 (5–4)	Olympic Auditorium; Los Angeles, CA
*Non-conference game. ^{#}Rankings from AP Poll. (#) Tournament seedings in parentheses. All times are in Pacific Time.
