= 1927–28 Auburn Tigers men's basketball team =

American college basketball season

1927–28 Auburn Tigers men's basketball

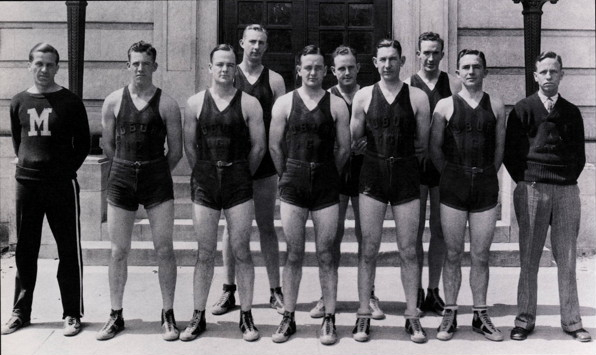

SoCon regular season champions
- Conference: Southern Conference
- Record: 20–2 (12–1 SoCon)
- Head coach: Mike Papke (3rd season)
- Captain: Fob James
- Home arena: Alumni Gymnasium

1927–28 Southern Conference men's basketball standings
| | Conf. | | | | Overall |
| Team | W | | L | PCT | W | | L | PCT |
|---|---|---|---|---|---|---|---|---|
| Auburn | 12 | – | 1 | .923 | 20 | – | 2 | .909 |
| Mississippi A&M | 10 | – | 1 | .909 | 13 | – | 7 | .650 |
| North Carolina | 8 | – | 1 | .889 | 17 | – | 2 | .895 |
| Maryland | 8 | – | 1 | .889 | 14 | – | 4 | .778 |
| Kentucky | 8 | – | 1 | .889 | 12 | – | 6 | .667 |
| LSU | 7 | – | 3 | .700 | 14 | – | 4 | .778 |
| Virginia | 10 | – | 5 | .667 | 20 | – | 6 | .769 |
| Georgia | 8 | – | 5 | .615 | 13 | – | 10 | .565 |
| VMI | 5 | – | 5 | .500 | 7 | – | 6 | .538 |
| Alabama | 5 | – | 5 | .500 | 10 | – | 10 | .500 |
| Clemson | 5 | – | 7 | .417 | 9 | – | 14 | .391 |
| South Carolina | 4 | – | 7 | .364 | 8 | – | 12 | .400 |
| Mississippi† | 5 | – | 9 | .357 | 10 | – | 9 | .526 |
| NC State | 3 | – | 6 | .333 | 10 | – | 8 | .556 |
| Vanderbilt | 2 | – | 5 | .286 | 5 | – | 7 | .417 |
| Virginia Tech | 3 | – | 7 | .300 | 5 | – | 11 | .313 |
| Washington and Lee | 3 | – | 7 | .300 | 5 | – | 12 | .294 |
| Florida | 2 | – | 10 | .167 | 5 | – | 16 | .238 |
| Sewanee | 1 | – | 5 | .167 | 2 | – | 7 | .222 |
| Tulane | 3 | – | 15 | .167 | 3 | – | 15 | .167 |
| Tennessee | 0 | – | 8 | .000 | 0 | – | 12 | .000 |
† Southern Conference Tournament winner

The 1927–28 Auburn Tigers men's basketball team represented Auburn University in the 1927–28 college basketball season. The team's head coach was Mike Papke, who was in his third season at Auburn. The team played their home games at Alumni Gymnasium in Auburn, Alabama. They finished the season 20–2, 12–1 in SoCon play to win the SoCon regular season championship. They defeated Clemson, Georgia Tech, and Mississippi A&M to advance to the championship game of the Southern Conference tournament where they lost to Mississippi.

== Schedule and results ==
| Date time, TV | Rank^{#} | Opponent^{#} | Result | Record | High points | High rebounds | High assists | Site (attendance) city, state |
Regular season
| * | | Montgomery YMCA | W 38–12 | 1–0 | – – – | – – – | – – – | Alumni Gymnasium (–); Auburn, AL |
| * | | White's Business College | W 92–13 | 2–0 | – – – | – – – | – – – | Alumni Gymnasium (–); Auburn, AL |
| January 7, 1928* | | Georgia Tech | W 56–29 | 3–0 | – – – | – – – | – – – | Alumni Gymnasium (–); Auburn, AL |
| January 1928* | | Southern College | W 51–18 | 4–0 | – – – | – – – | – – – | Alumni Gymnasium (–); Auburn, AL |
| January 13, 1928 | | at Florida | W 39–23 | 5–0 (1–0) | – – – | – – – | – – – | New Gymnasium (–); Gainesville, FL |
| January 14, 1928 | | at Florida | W 43–33 | 6–0 (2–0) | – – – | – – – | – – – | New Gymnasium (–); Gainesville, FL |
| January 18, 1928 | | Clemson | W 56–26 | 7–0 (3–0) | – – – | – – – | – – – | Alumni Gymnasium (–); Auburn, AL |
| January 19, 1928 | | Clemson | W 30–23 | 8–0 (4–0) | – – – | – – – | – – – | Alumni Gymnasium (–); Auburn, AL |
| January 27, 1928 | | at Tulane | W 32–17 | 9–0 (5–0) | – – – | – – – | – – – | (–); New Orleans, LA |
| January 28, 1928 | | at Tulane | W 49–31 | 10–0 (6–0) | – – – | – – – | – – – | (–); New Orleans, LA |
| January 29, 1928 | | Tennessee | W 63–14 | 11–0 (7–0) | – – – | – – – | – – – | Alumni Gymnasium (–); Auburn, AL |
| February 1, 1928 | | Vanderbilt | W 62–28 | 12–0 (8–0) | – – – | – – – | – – – | Alumni Gymnasium (–); Auburn, AL |
| February 3, 1928 | | Georgia | W 28–25 | 13–0 (9–0) | – – – | – – – | – – – | Alumni Gymnasium (–); Auburn, AL |
| February 9, 1928* | | Georgetown (KY) | W 41–25 | 14–0 | – – – | – – – | – – – | Alumni Gymnasium (–); Auburn, AL |
| February 10, 1928 | | Mississippi | L 42–43 | 14–1 (9–1) | – – – | – – – | – – – | Alumni Gymnasium (–); Auburn, AL |
| February 11, 1928 | | Mississippi | W 58–38 | 15–1 (10–1) | – – – | – – – | – – – | Alumni Gymnasium (–); Auburn, AL |
| February 21, 1928 | | Florida | W 58–32 | 16–1 (11–1) | – – – | – – – | – – – | Alumni Gymnasium (–); Auburn, AL |
| February 22, 1928 | | Florida | W 50–28 | 17–1 (12–1) | – – – | – – – | – – – | Alumni Gymnasium (–); Auburn, AL |
SoCon tournament
| February 25, 1928 | | vs. Clemson; First round | W 27–26 | 18–1 | 13 – Akin | – – – | – – – | Municipal Auditorium (–); Atlanta, GA |
| February 26, 1928; 8:00 pm | | vs. Georgia Tech; Quarterfinals | W 30–29 | 19–1 | 11 – Akin | – – – | – – – | Municipal Auditorium (5,000); Atlanta, GA |
| February 27, 1928 | | vs. Mississippi A&M; Semifinals | W 42–34 | 20–1 | 16 – Akin | – – – | – – – | Municipal Auditorium (–); Atlanta, GA |
| February 28, 1928; 8:15 pm | | vs. Mississippi; Championship | L 30–31 | 20–2 | 15 – Akin | – – – | – – – | Municipal Auditorium (–); Atlanta, GA |
*Non-conference game. ^{#}Rankings from AP Poll. (#) Tournament seedings in parentheses. All times are in Central Time.
