= Frank Harrigan =

American basketball player (1904–1969)

- Harrigan cropped from 1926–27 Michigan team portrait

Personal information
- Born: December 28, 1904 Hairwood, West Virginia, U.S.
- Died: July 7, 1969 (aged 64) Grand Rapids, Michigan, U.S.
- Listed height: 6 ft 2.5 in (1.89 m)

Career information
- College: Michigan (1925–1928)

Career highlights
- AAU All-American (1929)

Frank Arnold Harrigan (December 28, 1904 – July 7, 1969) was an American basketball player. As a student at the University of Michigan, he was a member of the Michigan Wolverines men's basketball team from 1925 to 1928. He was the leading scorer on the 1925–26 and 1926–27 teams that won consecutive Big Ten Conference championships. He was also the captain of the 1927–28 team and the first Michigan basketball player to score over 100 points in three consecutive seasons. He continued playing organized basketball for several years after graduating from Michigan and was selected as an AAU All-American while playing AAU basketball for the Cook Paint and Varnish team that won the 1929 national championship. He later played semi-professional basketball for the Akron Goodyears from 1931 to 1934.

== Early years ==
He graduated from Florence Union High School in 1923. While at Florence Union, he was the captain of the 1923 basketball team and a member of the football and track teams, the glee club, and the art club. The Florence Union yearbook for 1923 said of Harrigan: "His fame was great in all the land,"

== Student athlete at Michigan ==
Harrigan attended the University of Michigan. While attending Michigan, he played three years at the forward and guard positions for the basketball team from 1924 to 1927. As a sophomore, he was the leading scorer on the 1925–26 basketball team that finished in a tie for the Big Ten Conference basketball championship. As a junior, Harrigan and Bennie Oosterbaan led the 1926–27 team to a 14–2 record and the school's first outright Big Ten basketball championship. Harrigan led the 1926–27 team with 153 points, and Oosterbaan added 130 points. As a senior, Harrigan was the team captain and second leading scorer. Harrigan was the first player in Michigan basketball history to score over 100 points in three consecutive seasons, totaling 106, 153, and 172 points in his three seasons at Michigan.

== AAU and semi-professional basketball ==
Harrigan played AAU basketball after graduating from Michigan. He was a member of the Cook Paint and Varnish team out of Kansas City, Missouri. The Cook Paint team, commonly known as the "Cook Painter Boys," won the national AAU basketball championship in 1928 and again in 1929. A December 1928 newspaper article on the Cook team noted: "Frank Harrigan, one of the regular forwards, was an all-Big Ten selection during his three years with the University of Michigan. Harrigan stands two and a half inches over the six-foot mark and is one of the fastest men on the squad." Harrigan was known as "a deadly shot" for the 1929 Cook team, and was selected as a first-team AAU All-American for the 1928–29 season.

From 1931 to 1934, as elite corporate AAU teams began to evolve toward the creation of the first professional basketball league, Harrigan played for the Akron Goodyears.
