= Homer Hazel =

American football player and coach (1895–1968)

Biographical details
- Born: June 2, 1895; Piffard, New York, U.S.
- Died: February 3, 1968 (aged 72); Marshall, Michigan, U.S.

Playing career

Football
- 1916: Rutgers
- 1923–1924: Rutgers
- Positions: End, fullback

Coaching career (HC unless noted)

Football
- 1925–1929: Ole Miss

Basketball
- 1925–1930: Ole Miss

Administrative career (AD unless noted)
- 1925–1930: Ole Miss

Head coaching record
- Overall: 21–22–3 (football); 54–32 (basketball)

Accomplishments and honors

Championships
- Basketball; Southern Conference tournament (1928)

Awards
- 2× First-team All-American (1923, 1924)
- College Football Hall of Fame; Inducted in 1951 (profile)

Homer Howard "Pop" Hazel (June 2, 1895 – February 3, 1968) was an American football player and coach. He played college football at Rutgers University in 1916 and again from 1923 to 1924. Considered an outstanding punter, kicker, and passer, he was selected as a first-team All-American as an end in 1923 and as a fullback in 1924. He was the first player selected as an All-American at two different positions. He also lettered in baseball, basketball and track at Rutgers.

Hazel served as the head football and basketball coach and athletic director at the University of Mississippi from 1925 until his resignation in early 1931. After leaving his position at Mississippi, he was a professional golfer for four years. In 1951, Hazel became one of the inaugural inductees into the College Football Hall of Fame.

== Early years ==
Hazel was born in 1895 at Piffard, New York. His father, John Hazel, was a New York native who worked as a farm laborer. His mother, Margaret Hazel, was an Irish immigrant. In 1909, Hazel moved to Litchfield Township, Michigan, where his father was a farmer and 15-year-old Homer worked as a farm laborer. In 1912, he enrolled at Montclair Academy in New Jersey and became a football star there. He also excelled in the broad jump and discus throw at Montclair.

== Rutgers ==
Hazel enrolled at Rutgers University where he played at the fullback position for the 1916 Rutgers Scarlet Knights football team. He set a Rutgers record in 1916 by kicking five field goals. He was the only player in the country to kick multiple field goals in 1916. After the 1916 season, Hazel left Rutgers due to a lack of funds, and to marry and start a family.

Hazel was married in March 1917 to Marguerite Lorenz. They had three children, and Hazel took jobs as a farm laborer and later as a worker in the mines of the Flint Foundry Company. By 1920, he had been promoted to a superintendent position at a salary of $5,000 a year.

Hazel returned to Rutgers in 1922. He began competing in discus and shot put in the spring of 1922. Upon his return, Hazel was 26 years old, had a wife and children, and was referred to as a "veteran freshman". Eligibility rules prevented him from playing on the Rutgers football team in 1922, so he instead worked as an assistant coach under George Sanford.

In 1923, with his eligibility restored, Hazel, at age 28, starred for the Rutgers football team. He was credited with the longest pass in college football that year, a pass that covered 69 yards in the air. He also scored a touchdown on his own kickoff on October 6, 1923, when an opposing player fumbled the ball behind the goal line, and Hazel fell on the loose ball for the touchdown. At the end of the season, Hazel was selected by Walter Camp as a first-team end on the 1923 College Football All-America Team.

In 1924, a 29-year-old Hazel became known as "one of the best passers and kickers in the country." He was selected by Walter Camp, Football World magazine, and All-Sports Magazine as the first-team fullback on the 1924 College Football All-America Team. He was the first player to receive All-America honors at two different positions. Walter Camp reportedly said that Hazel could have been an All-American at any position.

After the 1924 season, Cornell coach Gil Dobie published a column describing Hazel's unusual punting style:

Hazel employs a style in punting that is unusual. After receiving the ball from center he takes a couple of steps almost directly to the right, so that when his foot hits the ball he is practically facing the sideline. ... [N]ot only could he send the ball down the field high and far and straight as a dye, but he was uncanny in placing it.

Hazel also won letters for Rutgers in baseball, basketball, and track. He also competed for Rutgers in tennis and lacrosse. He graduated from Rutgers in June 1925 and was regarded as "one of the greatest all-around athletes in Rutgers history."

== Coaching career ==
In February 1925, Hazel signed to become the head football coach at the University of Mississippi. Homer coached the Ole Miss Rebels football team for five years, compiling records of 5–5 in 1925, 5–4 in 1926, 5–3–1 in 1927, 5–4 in 1928, and 1–6–2 in 1929. His five-year record as head football coach was 21–22–3. After the poor showing in 1929, the Ole Miss student body and alumni were reportedly opposed to Hazel's tactics on the football field. Hazel resigned his post at Ole Miss in January 1930. Thad Vann, who played for Hazel at Ole Miss from 1926 to 1929, later credited Hazel with "launching the University of Mississippi's rise as a national football power."

Hazel was also head coach of the Ole Miss Rebels men's basketball team for five years, compiling a 54–32 record.

== Later years and family ==
Hazel was married to Marguerite Lorenz in 1917. After resigning from his position at Ole Miss, Hazel moved to Marshall, Michigan, where he lived for the following 38 years. He became a professional golfer for four years. Hazel and his wife had three children, including sons Homer and Bill who played college football for Ole Miss. Son Homer was captain of the 1941 Ole Miss football team and died in a plane crash in 1942.

Hazel worked for 20 years as a personnel director, including stints at Eaton Manufacturing Company and Wilcox-Rich Corporation. In 1951, he was elected by the country's sports writers and broadcasters as part of the inaugural class (32 players, 21 coaches) to be inducted into the newly organized Football Hall of Fame (later renamed the College Football Hall of Fame) located on the Rutgers campus near the site of the first college football game.

Hazel retired in 1960, and his wife died in 1962. Hazel died at Community Hospital in Battle Creek, Michigan, in February 1968. He was 72 years old at the time of his death and had undergone abdominal surgery twice in the days before his death.

== Head coaching record ==
=== Football ===
Year	Team	Overall	Conference	Standing	Bowl/playoffs
Ole Miss Rebels (Southern Conference) (1925–1929)
1925	Ole Miss	5–5	0–4	T–20th	
1926	Ole Miss	5–4	2–2	T–10th	
1927	Ole Miss	5–3–1	3–2	7th	
1928	Ole Miss	5–4	3–3	T–9th	
1929	Ole Miss	1–6–2	0–4–2	19th	
Ole Miss:		21–22–3	8–15–2		
Total:		21–22–3			
