= Tony Comerford =

American football player and coach

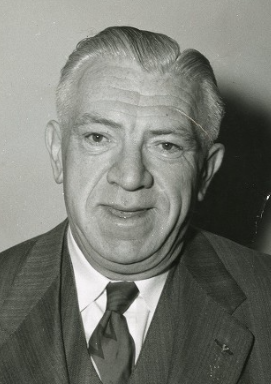

Biographical details
- Born: January 25, 1898; Worcester, Massachusetts, U.S.
- Died: August 25, 1970 (aged 72); Brighton, Massachusetts, U.S.

Playing career
- 1919–1922: Boston College
- 1923: Star Taxis
- 1924: Everett
- Positions: End; Centerfielder

Coaching career (HC unless noted)

Football
- 1923: Dummer Academy
- 1924: Newport Naval Training Station
- 1926: Boston College (ends)
- 1927: Fordham (assistant)
- 1928–1933: Loyola (MD)
- 1934–?: Canisius (assistant)
- 1941: Saint Anselm

Basketball
- 1928–1929: Loyola (MD)
- 1930–1934: Loyola (MD)

Administrative career (AD unless noted)
- 1928–1933: Loyola (MD)

Head coaching record
- Overall: 43–34 (college basketball)

Walter Anthony Comerford (January 25, 1898 – August 25, 1970) was an American college football and basketball coach, university athletic director, minor league baseball player, government official, and United States Marine. He served as the head football and basketball coach at the Loyola College of Maryland from 1928 to 1933.

== Early life ==
A native of Worcester, Massachusetts, Comerford served in the United States Marine Corps during World War I. He attended Boston College, where he played on the football team as an end from 1919 to 1922, and was the team captain in 1921. Comerford also played baseball and ran track for Boston College.

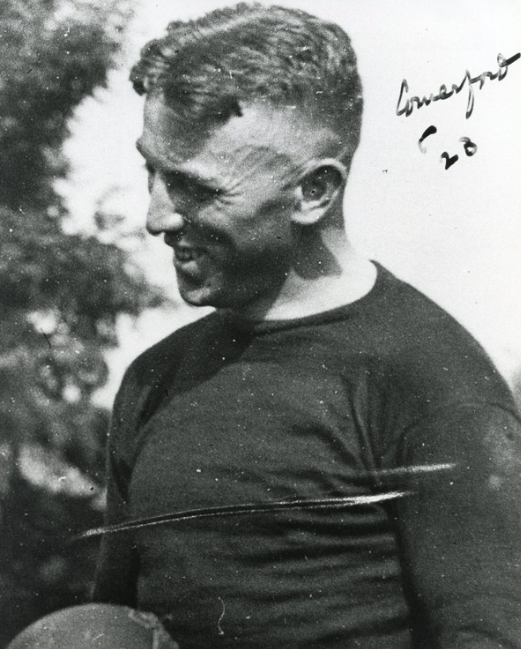
Comerford played football at Boston College from 1919 to 1922

== Coaching career ==
After graduating in 1923, Comerford played minor league baseball for the Star Taxis club in Lewiston, Maine. In the fall, he coached the football team at Dummer Academy in South Byfield, Massachusetts. The following season, he played minor league baseball with the Everett club of the Boston Twilight League.

In 1924, Comerford coached the Newport Naval Training Station football team. In 1925 and 1926, he played center field for the Osterville town team in the Cape Cod Baseball League.

He returned to his alma mater to coach the Boston College ends under Frank Cavanaugh during the 1926 season. In 1927, he followed Cavanaugh to Fordham University to serve as an assistant coach and the freshman coach.

In March 1928, Loyola College in Baltimore hired Comerford as its athletic director and coach. He served as the school's football coach from 1928 to 1933 and basketball coach for the 1928–29 season and from 1930 to 1934. His basketball teams amassed a 43–34 record. During the 1932 season, the football team traveled to his alma mater, Boston College, to play the dedication game at newly renovated Alumni Field. Boston College won, 14–0. Loyola discontinued its football program after the 1933 season, and Comerford left the school. In 1934, while an assistant at Canisius College, he filled in for head coach William Joy, who had been seriously injured in an automobile accident. Saint Anselm College hired Comerford as its head football coach in 1941. He remained there for one season and finished with a 1–6 record.

== Later life ==
By 1943, he was seated on the Massachusetts State Parole Board. In 1951, he was appointed as the executive assistant to Boston Mayor John Hynes for Region Five of the Civil Defense Agency. Comerford died at St. Elizabeth's Hospital in Brighton, Massachusetts, on August 25, 1970, at the age of 72. The Boston College Varsity Club Athletic Hall of Fame inducted him in 1982.
