= 1927–28 Washington State Cougars men's basketball team =

American college basketball season

1927–28 Washington State Cougars men's basketball
- Conference: Pacific Coast Conference
- Record: 7–17 (1–9 PCC)
- Head coach: Karl Schlademan (2nd season)

1927–28 Pacific Coast Conference men's basketball standings
	Conf.				Overall
Team	W		L	PCT	W		L	PCT
North
Washington	9	–	1	.900	22	–	6	.786
Oregon	8	–	2	.800	18	–	3	.857
Idaho	4	–	6	.400	7	–	7	.500
Oregon State	4	–	6	.400	15	–	16	.484
Montana	4	–	6	.400	6	–	8	.429
Washington State	1	–	9	.100	7	–	17	.292
South
USC †	6	–	3	.667	22	–	4	.846
California	6	–	3	.667	9	–	6	.600
UCLA	5	–	4	.556	10	–	5	.667
Stanford	1	–	8	.111	8	–	13	.381
† Conference playoff series winner

The 1927–28 Washington State Cougars men's basketball team represented Washington State College for the 1927–28 college basketball season. Led by second-year head coach Karl Schlademan, the Cougars were members of the Pacific Coast Conference and played their home games on campus in Pullman, Washington.

The Cougars were 7–17 overall in the regular season and 1–9 in conference play, last in the Northern division.

Schlademan was the track and field coach for the Cougars until 1940, but this was his final year as head basketball coach. He was succeeded by alumnus Jack Friel, who was the head coach at North Central High School in Spokane, and won the state title in his third and final season at NCHS in 1928. A former team captain and all-conference player under Fred Bohler, Friel led Washington State as head coach for three decades.
