= 1927–28 Duke Blue Devils men's basketball team =

American college basketball season

1927–28 Duke Blue Devils men's basketball
- Conference: Independent
- Record: 9–5
- Head coach: George Buchheit (4th season)
- Home arena: Alumni Memorial Gymnasium

The 1927–28 Duke Blue Devils men's basketball team represented Duke University during the 1927–28 men's college basketball season. The head coach was George Buchheit, coaching his fourth season with the Blue Devils. The team finished with an overall record of 9–5.

== Schedule ==
Date time, TV	Opponent	Result	Record	Site city, state
*	Davidson	W 46–27	1–0	
*	Georgia	W 49–44	2–0	
*	Wake Forest	W 45–17	3–0	
*	Virginia	L 34–44	3–1	
*	Georgetown	L 40–55	3–2	
1/11/1928*	South Carolina	W 39–32	4–2	
1/12/1928*	N.C. State	W 32–29	5–2	
2/4/1928*	at North Carolina	L 14–27	5–3	Chapel Hill, NC
2/7/1928*	at Virginia Tech	W 37–27	6–3	
2/8/1928*	at Washington and Lee	W 53–41	7–3	
2/11/1928*	North Carolina	L 23–32	7–4	Alumni Memorial Gym; Durham, NC
2/14/1928*	Wake Forest	W 37–34	8–4	
2/20/1928*	N.C. State	L 27–37	8–5	
2/22/1928*	Davidson	W 51–33	9–5	
*Non-conference game. (#) Tournament seedings in parentheses.
