= Mike Papke =

American athlete and coach (1900–1979)

Biographical details
- Born: June 26, 1900; Milwaukee, Wisconsin, U.S.
- Died: January 27, 1979 (aged 78); Milwaukee, Wisconsin, U.S.

Playing career

Football
- 1921–1924: Middlebury

Baseball
- 1922–1925: Middlebury

Coaching career (HC unless noted)

Men's basketball
- 1925–1928: Auburn

Football
- 1925–1927: Auburn (backfield)

Baseball
- 1928: Auburn (freshmen)

Head coaching record
- Overall: 38–18 (.679) (basketball)

Aloys Peter "Mike" Papke (June 26, 1900 – January 27, 1979) was an American athlete and coach who played quarterback for Middlebury College from 1921 to 1924. He was a member of the 1923 team that tied powerhouse Harvard 6–6. From 1925 to 1928, he was the head men's basketball and assistant football at the Alabama Polytechnic Institute (now known as Auburn University).

== Early life ==
Papke was born in Milwaukee on June 26, 1900 to John M. and Rose (Muth) Papke. He graduated from in South Division High School in 1920.

== Middlebury College ==
Papke lettered in baseball and football all four years he attended Middlebury College. He was captain of the baseball team in 1925.

On October 13, 1923, Papke helped Middlebury, which had only 280 male students, to a surprising 6–6 tie against Harvard. He was the holder on both of Marshall Klevenow's field goals and his third quarter punt return helped put Middlebury in position its first field goal. He completed a 90-yard touchdown pass in Middlebury's October 19, 1924 game against Tufts, which was the longest touchdown pass of the 1924 college football season (Carl B. Merrill of Western Maryland also had a 90-yard touchdown pass that season).

== Auburn ==
In 1925, Middlebury's football coach Dave Morey was hired for the same position at Auburn. Papke joined him as an assistant football coach and head men's basketball coach. He led the Tigers to a 38–18 record over three seasons. His 1927–28 team went 20–2 and were regular season champions of the Southern Conference. He was also coach of the Auburn freshmen baseball team during the 1928 season. He left the school on August 31, 1928 after he was unable to agree with the university on a salary. It was believed that the hiring of head football coach George Bohler, who also coached basketball, played a role in the university not coming to terms with Papke.

== Later life ==
Papke returned to Milwaukee and spent 35 years with A. O. Smith. He retired in 1964 as director of manufacturing. He died on January 27, 1979.
