= 1927–28 Washington Huskies men's basketball team =

American college basketball season

1927–28 Washington Huskies men's basketball

PCC Northern Division Champions
- Conference: Pacific Coast Conference
- Record: 22–6 (9–1 PCC)
- Head coach: Hec Edmundson (8th season)
- Captain: Alfie James
- Home arena: UW Pavilion (opened December 27)

1927–28 Pacific Coast Conference men's basketball standings
	Conf.				Overall
Team	W		L	PCT	W		L	PCT
North
Washington	9	–	1	.900	22	–	6	.786
Oregon	8	–	2	.800	18	–	3	.857
Idaho	4	–	6	.400	7	–	7	.500
Oregon State	4	–	6	.400	15	–	16	.484
Montana	4	–	6	.400	6	–	8	.429
Washington State	1	–	9	.100	7	–	17	.292
South
USC †	6	–	3	.667	22	–	4	.846
California	6	–	3	.667	9	–	6	.600
UCLA	5	–	4	.556	10	–	5	.667
Stanford	1	–	8	.111	8	–	13	.381
† Conference playoff series winner

The 1927–28 Washington Huskies men's basketball team represented the University of Washington for the 1927–28 NCAA college basketball season. Led by eighth-year head coach Hec Edmundson, the Huskies were members of the Pacific Coast Conference and played their home games on campus at the new UW Pavilion in Seattle, Washington.

The Huskies were 22–4 overall in the regular season and 9–1 in conference play; first in the Northern division, the beginning of a five-year run as division winners. UW dropped their final conference game in overtime to Oregon. The new UW Pavilion was opened in late December with a three-game series against Illinois.

Washington traveled to Los Angeles and met Southern division winner USC in the Pacific Coast championship series. The Trojans swept in two close games; it was the fifth consecutive year that the title series was won by the Southern division team.

The National Invitation Tournament (NIT) debuted in 1938, and the NCAA Tournament in 1939.

== Postseason results ==
Date time, TV	Opponent	Result	Record	Site (attendance) city, state
Pacific Coast Conference Playoff Series
Mon, March 5	at USC; Game One	L 50–53	22–5	Los Angeles, California
Tue, March 6	at USC; Game Two	L 26–27	22–6	Los Angeles, California
*Non-conference game. (#) Tournament seedings in parentheses. All times are in Pacific time.
