= 1927–28 Wisconsin Badgers men's basketball team =

American college basketball season

1927–28 Wisconsin Badgers men's basketball
- Conference: Big Ten Conference
- Record: 13–4 (9–3 Big Ten)
- Head coach: Walter Meanwell
- Home arena: Red Gym

1927–28 Big Ten Conference men's basketball standings
	Conf.				Overall
Team	W		L	PCT	W		L	PCT
Indiana	10	–	2	.833	15	–	2	.882
Purdue	10	–	2	.833	15	–	2	.882
Wisconsin	9	–	3	.750	13	–	4	.765
Northwestern	9	–	3	.750	12	–	5	.706
Michigan	7	–	5	.583	10	–	7	.588
Chicago	5	–	7	.417	8	–	9	.471
Iowa	3	–	9	.250	6	–	11	.353
Ohio State	3	–	9	.250	5	–	12	.294
Illinois	2	–	10	.167	5	–	12	.294
Minnesota	2	–	10	.167	4	–	12	.250

The 1927–28 Wisconsin Badgers men's basketball team represented University of Wisconsin–Madison. The head coach was Walter Meanwell, coaching his fourteenth season with the Badgers. The team played their home games at the Red Gym in Madison, Wisconsin and was a member of the Big Ten Conference.

== Schedule ==
Date time, TV	Rank^{#}	Opponent^{#}	Result	Record	Site city, state
Regular Season
12/10/1927*		Coe (IA)	W 18–6	1–0	Red Gym; Madison, Wisconsin
12/16/1927*		Butler	W 25–18	2–0	Red Gym; Madison, Wisconsin
12/19/1927*		DePauw (IN)	W 32–17	3–0	Red Gym; Madison, Wisconsin
1/02/1928*		Oregon State	W 36–21	4–0	Red Gym; Madison, Wisconsin
1/07/1928		at Ohio State	W 30–13	5–0 (1–0)	Ohio Expo Center Coliseum; Columbus, Ohio
1/09/1928		Michigan	W 26–22	6–0 (2–0)	Red Gym; Madison, Wisconsin
1/14/1928		at Minnesota	W 35–26	7–0 (3–0)	Kenwood Armory; Minneapolis
1/16/1928		Illinois	L 33–34	7–1 (3–1)	Red Gym; Madison, Wisconsin
2/07/1928*		Notre Dame	L 14–21	7–2	Red Gym; Madison, Wisconsin
2/11/1928		Minnesota	W 38–18	8–2 (4–1)	Red Gym; Madison, Wisconsin
2/18/1928		Ohio State	W 21–18	9–2 (5–1)	Red Gym; Madison, Wisconsin
2/20/1928		at Iowa	W 31–21	10–2 (6–1)	Iowa Field House; Iowa City, IA
2/23/1928		Purdue	W 28–22	11–2 (7–1)	Red Gym; Madison, Wisconsin
2/25/1928		at Purdue	L 15–31	11–3 (7–2)	Memorial Gymnasium; West Lafayette, Indiana
3/03/1928		Iowa	W 20–17	12–3 (8–2)	Red Gym; Madison, Wisconsin
3/05/1928		at Michigan	L 19–42	12–4 (8–3)	Yost Field House; Ann Arbor, Michigan
3/09/1928		at Illinois	W 32–22	13–4 (9–3)	Huff Hall; Champaign, Illinois
*Non-conference game. ^{#}Rankings from AP Poll. (#) Tournament seedings in parentheses.
