= Marshall Klevenow =

American football and baseball coach (1901–1976)

Biographical details
- Born: March 18, 1901; Milwaukee, Wisconsin, U.S.
- Died: November 4, 1976 (aged 75); Milwaukee, Wisconsin, U.S.

Playing career

Football
- c. 1923–1924: Middlebury

Baseball
- c. 1922–1925: Middlebury
- Positions: Fullback (football); Second baseman (baseball)

Coaching career (HC unless noted)

Football
- 1925–1927: Middlebury

Baseball
- 1926–1927: Middlebury

Head coaching record
- Overall: 7–13–1 (football); 6–21 (baseball)

Marshall Monroe Klevenow (March 18, 1901 – November 4, 1976) was an American college football and college baseball coach. He served as the head football coach at Middlebury College from 1925 to 1927, compiling a record of 7–13–1.

Klevenow grew up in Milwaukee and attended South Division High School. He attended Middlebury College where he played baseball and football. He played at the fullback position and was captain of Middlebury's 1923 and 1924 teams. He scored both field goals in Middlebury's surprise 6–6 tie against Harvard on October 13, 1923. He graduated in 1925 and was immediately hired as the school's football and baseball coach.

In early 1928, Klevenow resigned his posts at Middlebury and was hired as the head football coach at Lawrence College.

Klevenow is one of the namesakes of Middlebury's Hazeltine-Klevenow Memorial Trophy, awarded to student athletes who excel in both academics and athletics.

== Head coaching record ==
Year	Team	Overall	Conference	Standing	Bowl/playoffs
Middlebury Panthers (Independent) (1925–1927)
1925	Middlebury	3–5			
1926	Middlebury	3–4–1			
1927	Middlebury	1–4			
Middlebury:		7–13–1			
Total:		7–13–1			
