= 1927–28 Niagara Purple Eagles men's basketball team =

American college basketball season

1927–28 Niagara Purple Eagles men's basketball
- Conference: Independent
- Record: 11–5
- Head coach: William McCarthy (1st season)

The 1927–28 Niagara Orange Eagles men's basketball team represented Niagara University during the 1927–28 NCAA college men's basketball season. The head coach was William McCarthy, coaching his first season with the Purple Eagles.

== Schedule ==
Date time, TV	Opponent	Result	Record	Site city, state
	Tuscarora Indians	W 43–36	1–0	Lewiston, NY
	Toronto	W 38–28	2–0	Lewiston, NY
	Cornell	L 31–52	2–1	Lewiston, NY
	Buffalo Normal	W 43–22	3–1	Lewisburg, NY
	St. Lawrence	L 16–29	3–2	Lewiston, NY
	Buffalo	W 20–19	4–2	Lewiston, NY
	Alfred	W 39–36	5–2	Lewiston, NY
	Clarkson Tech	W 26–22	6–2	Lewiston, NY
	St. Lawrence	W 26–22	7–2	Lewisburg, NY
	Rochester	L 34–37	7–3	Lewisburg, NY
	Toronto	L 34–35	7–4	Lewiston, NY
	Rochester	L 19–47	7–5	Lewiston, NY
	Alfred	W 52–18	8–5	Lewiston, NY
	Buffalo	W 33–23	9–5	Lewiston, NY
	Clarkson Tech	W 34–19	10–5	Lewisburg, NY
3/03/1928	Villanova	W 25–22	11–5	Lewisburg, PA
*Non-conference game. (#) Tournament seedings in parentheses.
