= Joe Ramsey =

American basketball player and coach

Biographical details
- Born: January 3, 1943 (age 83); Sandoval, Illinois, U.S.

Playing career
- 1962–1965: Southern Illinois

Coaching career (HC unless noted)
- 1965–1967: Southern Illinois (GA)
- 1972–1973: Oklahoma (assistant)
- 1973–1975: Oklahoma
- 1975–1996: Millikin
- 1998–2003: Blackburn

Head coaching record
- Overall: 383–335 (.533)
- Tournaments: 1–5

Accomplishments and honors

Championships
- 2 CCIW (1983, 1989); SLIAC (2003)

Awards
- SLIAC Coach of the Year (2003)

Joe Ramsey (born January 3, 1943) is an American former college basketball player and coach. Ramsey attended Southern Illinois University and played on the school's basketball team. He was later inducted in the Saluki Hall of Fame. The Baltimore Bullets selected Ramsey with the 96th selection in the 1965 NBA draft. He was the head basketball coach at Oklahoma, Millikin, and Blackburn.

== Coaching career ==
Ramsey served as a graduate assistant coach for SIU. He later was an assistant coach at Kansas State, and Oklahoma. He was the head basketball coach at Oklahoma, from 1973 to 1975. He took over the program after recently hired head coach Les Lane died of a heart attack. In 1975, Oklahoma fired Ramsey after a 31–21 record. He later became the head coach at Millikin, from 1975 to 1996, where the Big Blue made two NCAA Division III men's basketball tournament appearances won two College Conference of Illinois and Wisconsin championships. While at Millikin he also coached golf. He later coached Blackburn, from 1998 to 2003. In his final season the Beavers won the St. Louis Intercollegiate Athletic Conference championship. Ramsey was named the conference's coach of the year. He has a head coaching record of 383–335.

== Head coaching record ==
Record table
Season	Team	Overall	Conference	Standing	Postseason
Oklahoma Sooners (Big 8 Conference) (1973–1975)
1973–74	Oklahoma	18–8	9–5	3rd	
1974–75	Oklahoma	13–13	6–8	5th	
Oklahoma:		31–21 (.596)	15–13 (.536)		
Millikin Big Blue (College Conference of Illinois and Wisconsin) (1975–1996)
1975–76	Millikin	11–15	7–9	T–5th	
1976–77	Millikin	15–11	10–6	T–3rd	
1977–78	Millikin	13–13	10–6	T–4th	
1978–79	Millikin	17–9	11–5	T–2nd	
1979–80	Millikin	14–11	11–5	T–3rd	
1980–81	Millikin	14–12	9–7	4th	
1981–82	Millikin	13–11	9–6	4th	
1982–83	Millikin	21–7	12–4	1st	NCAA Division III Sweet Sixteen
1983–84	Millikin	12–14	6–10	T–5th	
1984–85	Millikin	3–23	2–14	9th	
1985–86	Millikin	9–17	5–11	6th	
1986–87	Millikin	17–8	11–5	4th	
1987–88	Millikin	22–6	13–3	2nd	NCAA Division III Sweet Sixteen
1988–89	Millikin	20–7	13–3	T–1st	NCAA Division III Sweet Sixteen
1989–90	Millikin	11–14	4–12	T–6th	
1990–91	Millikin	14–12	8–8	T–4th	
1991–92	Millikin	15–11	8–8	5th	
1992–93	Millikin	13–12	7–7	T–4th	
1993–94	Millikin	17–8	10–4	T–2nd	
1994–95	Millikin	14–11	6–8	T–4th	
1995–96	Millikin	8–17	3–11	T–6th	
Millikin:		293–249 (.541)	173–152 (.532)		
Blackburn Beavers (St. Louis Intercollegiate Athletic Conference) (1998–2003)
1998–99	Blackburn	9–16	6–8	T–6th	
1999–2000	Blackburn	8–16	5–9	6th	
2000–01	Blackburn	13–12	10–4	T–2nd	
2001–02	Blackburn	14–11	7–7	4th	
2002–03	Blackburn	15–10	11–3	1st	NCAA Division III First Round
Blackburn:		59–65 (.476)	39–31 (.557)		
Total:		383–335 (.533)			
National champion Postseason invitational champion Conference regular season champion Conference regular season and conference tournament champion Division regular season champion Division regular season and conference tournament champion Conference tournament champion
