= 1927–28 Illinois Fighting Illini men's basketball team =

American college basketball season

1927–28 Illinois Fighting Illini men's basketball
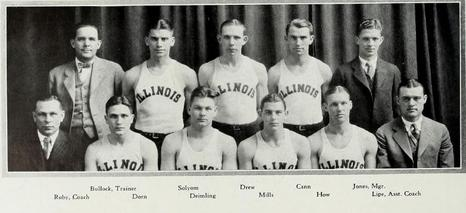
- Conference: Big Ten Conference
- Record: 5–12 (2–10 Big Ten)
- Head coach: J. Craig Ruby (6th season)
- Assistant coach: Jack Lipe (4th season)
- Captain: Everett Olson
- Home arena: Huff Hall

1927–28 Big Ten Conference men's basketball standings
	Conf.				Overall
Team	W		L	PCT	W		L	PCT
Indiana	10	–	2	.833	15	–	2	.882
Purdue	10	–	2	.833	15	–	2	.882
Wisconsin	9	–	3	.750	13	–	4	.765
Northwestern	9	–	3	.750	12	–	5	.706
Michigan	7	–	5	.583	10	–	7	.588
Chicago	5	–	7	.417	8	–	9	.471
Iowa	3	–	9	.250	6	–	11	.353
Ohio State	3	–	9	.250	5	–	12	.294
Illinois	2	–	10	.167	5	–	12	.294
Minnesota	2	–	10	.167	4	–	12	.250

The 1927–28 Illinois Fighting Illini men's basketball team represented the University of Illinois.

== Regular season ==
The 1927–28 season produced the only losing campaign in the 14-year tenure of head coach Craig Ruby at the University of Illinois. Having only one returning senior on a team predominantly consisting of Juniors, Ruby entered his sixth season as head coach of the Fighting Illini with an overall record of 50 wins and 33 losses. This season also produced the Ruby's only losing season in the Big Ten with a conference record of 2 wins and 10 losses. The starting lineup included captain Everett Olson at center, Ernest Dorn and Earl H. Drew at forward, and future head coach Douglas R. Mills, Keston J. Deimling and Andrew R. Solyom at guard.

=== Roster ===
1927–28 Illinois Fighting Illini men's basketball team
Players
Coaches

Pos.	#	Name	Height	Weight	Year	Hometown
C	3	Forrest H. Lindsay	—	—	Jr	Tulsa, Oklahoma
F	4	Huber Hughes Edwards	—	—	Jr	Newton, Illinois
F	5	Ernest Dorn	—	—	Jr	Chicago, Illinois
G	6	Fremont G. Cann	—	—	Jr	Oregon, Illinois
G	7	Douglas R. Mills	—	—	So	Elgin, Illinois
C	8	Andrew R. Solyom	—	—	So	Hammond, Indiana
F	9	Omar C. Lee	—	—	Sr	Frankfort, Illinois
F	10	John D. How	—	—	Jr	Lakeville, Indiana
G	11	Earl H. Johnson	—	—	So	Batavia, Illinois
G	12	C. Donnelly Gamble	—	—	Jr	Champaign, Illinois
G	14	Keston J. Deimling	—	—	Jr	Stevens Point, Wisconsin
G	15	James W. Lewis	—	—	So	Waukegan, Illinois
G	16	Roy Greene	—	—	Jr	Renovo, Pennsylvania
G	17	Carl H. Bergeson	—	—	So	Batavia, Illinois
G	18	Raymond Eugene Fisher	—	—	So	Champaign, Illinois
G	19	Edwin J. Simionich	—	—	Jr	Joliet, Illinois
F	20	William Lincoln Julian	—	—	Jr	Grant Park, Illinois
F	21	Vance Cummins	—	—	Jr	Joliet, Illinois
G	22	Everette Olson (C)	—	—	Sr	Champaign, Illinois
C	23	Lee Hickox	—	—	So	Evanston, Illinois
G	24	Herbert Gustave Lind	—	—	Jr	Chicago, Illinois
F	25	William E. Short	—	—	So	Frontenac, Kansas
F	26	Herbert K. Smock	—	—	So	Moweaqua, Illinois
F	27	William Bunn	—	—	Sr	Byron, Illinois
F	28	Earl Drew	—	—	Jr	Champaign, Illinois
C	29	Rufus Glass	—	—	Jr	Kokomo, Indiana
G	R	Henry Thomas Winterbauer	—	—	Jr	Athens, Illinois
F	R	Richard Anthony Floberg	—	—	So	Rockford, Illinois
G	R	Harry Lambert Logan	—	—	Jr	Salem, Illinois
F	R	Darrell Ova Overpeck	—	—	So	Clinton, Indiana
G	R	John H. Pribble	—	—	So	Salem, Illinois
G	R	Ernest W. Schultz	—	—	Sr	Geneseo, Illinois
F	R	Roland Sanford Wachob	—	—	Jr	Cherry Tree, Pennsylvania

Head coach

- Craig Ruby (University of Missouri) (6th year)

Assistant coach(es)

- Jack Lipe (University of Illinois) (4th year)

Legend

- (C) Team captain
- (S) Suspended
- (I) Ineligible
- (W) Walk-on
- Injured
- Current redshirt

Roster

== Schedule ==
Date time, TV	Rank^{#}	Opponent^{#}	Result	Record	Site (attendance) city, state
Non-Conference regular season
12/10/1927*		Knox	W 22–18	1–0	New Gymnasium (6,007); Champaign, IL
12/17/1927*		Bradley	W 41–35	2–0	New Gymnasium (6,149); Champaign, IL
12/27/1927*		at Washington; Pavilion dedication	L 23–34	2–1	UW Pavilion (7,500); Seattle, WA
12/29/1927*		at Washington	W 34–24	3–1	UW Pavilion; Seattle, WA
12/30/1927*		at Washington	L 26–32	3–2	UW Pavilion; Seattle, WA
Big Ten regular season
1/7/1928		Purdue	L 24–30	3–3 (0–1)	New Gymnasium (7,176); Champaign, IL
1/13/1928		at Iowa; Rivalry	L 30–36	3–4 (0–2)	Iowa Field House; Iowa City, IA
1/16/1928		at Wisconsin	W 34–33	4–4 (1–2)	UW Armory and Gymnasium; Madison, WI
1/21/1928		at Indiana; Rivalry	L 29–44	4–5 (1–3)	Men's Gymnasium; Bloomington, IN
2/8/1928		Northwestern; Rivalry	W 32–20	5–5 (2–3)	New Gymnasium (6,675); Champaign, IL
2/14/1928		at Purdue	L 14–40	5–6 (2–4)	Memorial Gymnasium; West Lafayette, IN
2/17/1928		at Chicago	L 26–52	5–7 (2–5)	Bartlett Gymnasium; Chicago, IL
2/24/1928		Iowa; Rivalry	L 27–41	5–8 (2–6)	New Gymnasium (5,359); Champaign, IL
3/1/1928		at Northwestern; Rivalry	L 31–39	5–9 (2–7)	Patten Gymnasium; Evanston, IL
3/3/1928		Chicago	L 18–19	5–10 (2–8)	New Gymnasium (5,457); Champaign, IL
3/6/1928		Indiana; Rivalry	L 23–27	5–11 (2–9)	New Gymnasium (5,737); Champaign, IL
3/9/1928		Wisconsin	L 22–32	5–12 (2–10)	New Gymnasium (5,642); Champaign, IL
*Non-conference game. ^{#}Rankings from AP Poll. (#) Tournament seedings in parentheses. All times are in Central time.
