= 1927–28 Idaho Vandals men's basketball team =

American college basketball season

1927–28 Idaho Vandals men's basketball
- Conference: Pacific Coast Conference
- Record: 14–10 (4–6 PCC)
- Head coach: Rich Fox (1st season)
- Assistant coach: Stew Beam
- Home arena: Armory and Gymnasium

1927–28 Pacific Coast Conference men's basketball standings
	Conf.				Overall
Team	W		L	PCT	W		L	PCT
North
Washington	9	–	1	.900	22	–	6	.786
Oregon	8	–	2	.800	18	–	3	.857
Idaho	4	–	6	.400	7	–	7	.500
Oregon State	4	–	6	.400	15	–	16	.484
Montana	4	–	6	.400	6	–	8	.429
Washington State	1	–	9	.100	7	–	17	.292
South
USC †	6	–	3	.667	22	–	4	.846
California	6	–	3	.667	9	–	6	.600
UCLA	5	–	4	.556	10	–	5	.667
Stanford	1	–	8	.111	8	–	13	.381
† Conference playoff series winner

The 1927–28 Idaho Vandals men's basketball team represented the University of Idaho during the 1927–28 NCAA college basketball season. Members of the Pacific Coast Conference, the Vandals were led by first-year head coach Rich Fox and played their home games on campus at the Armory and Gymnasium in Moscow, Idaho.

The Vandals were 14–10 overall and 4–6 in conference play.

Head coach Dave MacMillan had departed for Minnesota in the summer, and was succeeded by alumnus Fox, who had coached Pocatello High School to the state title in 1927; he returned to Moscow and led the Vandals for nine seasons.

This was the final season for varsity basketball at the Armory and Gymnasium as the Memorial Gymnasium opened in November 1928. The older building became the women's gym, and continues today as the Art and Architecture South.
