= 1927–28 Indiana Hoosiers men's basketball team =

American college basketball season

1927–28 Indiana Hoosiers men's basketball

Big Ten Champions
- Conference: Big Ten Conference
- Record: 15–2 (10–2 Big Ten)
- Head coach: Everett Dean (4th season)
- Captain: Robert Correll
- Home arena: Men's Gymnasium

1927–28 Big Ten Conference men's basketball standings
	Conf.				Overall
Team	W		L	PCT	W		L	PCT
Indiana	10	–	2	.833	15	–	2	.882
Purdue	10	–	2	.833	15	–	2	.882
Wisconsin	9	–	3	.750	13	–	4	.765
Northwestern	9	–	3	.750	12	–	5	.706
Michigan	7	–	5	.583	10	–	7	.588
Chicago	5	–	7	.417	8	–	9	.471
Iowa	3	–	9	.250	6	–	11	.353
Ohio State	3	–	9	.250	5	–	12	.294
Illinois	2	–	10	.167	5	–	12	.294
Minnesota	2	–	10	.167	4	–	12	.250

The 1927–28 Indiana Hoosiers men's basketball team represented Indiana University. Their head coach was Everett Dean, who was in his 4th year. For the last time, the team played its home games at the Men's Gymnasium in Bloomington, Indiana, and was a member of the Big Ten Conference.

The Hoosiers finished the regular season with an overall record of 15–2 and a conference record of 10–2, finishing 1st in the Big Ten Conference.

== Roster ==
No.	Name	Position	Ht.	Year	Hometown
3	Art Beckner	F	6–1	Sr.	Muncie, Indiana
4	Robert Correll	G	6–1	Sr.	Bloomington, Indiana
5	Dale Wells	F	6–1	Jr.	LaPorte, Indiana
6	James Strickland	F	6–2	So.	Owensville, Indiana
7	Branch McCracken	C	6–5	So.	Monrovia, Indiana
8	Maurice Starr	F	6–1	Sr.	Anderson, Indiana
9	Carl Scheid	G	6–1	Jr.	Vincennes, Indiana
10	Donald Cooper	F	6–1	So.	North Vernon, Indiana
13	James Gill	G	6–2	Jr.	Washington, Indiana
15	John Leonard	C	6–4	So.	Rochester, Indiana
18	Charles Benzel	G	5–8	Sr.	Bedford, Indiana

== Schedule/results ==
Date time, TV	Rank^{#}	Opponent^{#}	Result	Record	Site city, state
Regular season
12/13/1927*		Franklin College	W 34–25	1–0	Men's Gymnasium; Bloomington, Indiana
12/18/1927*		Wabash	W 39–26	2–0	Men's Gymnasium; Bloomington, Indiana
12/31/1927*		Cincinnati	W 29–17	3–0	Men's Gymnasium; Bloomington, Indiana
1/7/1928		Chicago	W 32–13	4–0 (1–0)	Men's Gymnasium; Bloomington, Indiana
1/14/1928		at Michigan	L 41–42	4–1 (1–1)	Yost Field House; Ann Arbor, Michigan
1/16/1928		at Chicago	W 35–12	5–1 (2–1)	Bartlett Gymnasium; Chicago
1/21/1928		Illinois; Rivalry	W 44–29	6–1 (3–1)	Men's Gymnasium; Bloomington, Indiana
1/25/1928		at Purdue; Rivalry	L 25–28	6–2 (3–2)	Memorial Gymnasium; West Lafayette, Indiana
2/4/1928*		Kentucky; Indiana–Kentucky rivalry	W 48–29	7–2 (3–2)	Men's Gymnasium; Bloomington, Indiana
2/11/1928		Iowa	W 50–33	8–2 (4–2)	Men's Gymnasium; Bloomington, Indiana
2/13/1928		Ohio State	W 43–26	9–2 (5–2)	Men's Gymnasium; Bloomington, Indiana
2/18/1928		Purdue; Rivalry	W 40–37	10–2 (6–2)	Men's Gymnasium; Bloomington, Indiana
2/20/1928*		Coe College	W 35–14	11–2 (6–2)	Men's Gymnasium; Bloomington, Indiana
2/22/1928		at Ohio State	W 52–17	12–2 (7–2)	Ohio Expo Center Coliseum; Columbus, Ohio
2/27/1928		at Iowa	W 49–39	13–2 (8–2)	Iowa Field House; Iowa City, IA
3/3/1928		Michigan	W 36–34	14–2 (9–2)	Men's Gymnasium; Bloomington, Indiana
3/6/1928		at Illinois; Rivalry	W 27–23	15–2 (10–2)	Huff Hall; Champaign, Illinois
*Non-conference game. ^{#}Rankings from AP Poll. (#) Tournament seedings in parentheses.
