= 1927–28 Oklahoma Sooners men's basketball team =

American college basketball season

1927–28 Oklahoma Sooners men's basketball

MVIAA Regular Season Champions
- Conference: Missouri Valley Intercollegiate Athletic Association
- Record: 18–0 (18–0 MVIAA)
- Head coach: Hugh McDermott (7th season)
- Home arena: McCasland Field House

1927–28 Missouri Valley Intercollegiate Athletic Association men's basketball standings
	Conf.				Overall
Team	W		L	PCT	W		L	PCT
Oklahoma	18	–	0	1.000	18	–	0	1.000
Missouri	13	–	5	.722	13	–	5	.722
Oklahoma A&M	11	–	7	.611	11	–	8	.579
Kansas	9	–	9	.500	9	–	9	.500
Kansas State	8	–	10	.444	10	–	10	.500
Washington University	8	–	10	.444	10	–	12	.455
Drake	7	–	11	.389	7	–	13	.350
Nebraska	7	–	11	.389	7	–	11	.389
Grinnell	6	–	12	.333	6	–	13	.316
Iowa State	3	–	15	.167	3	–	15	.167

The 1927–28 Oklahoma Sooners men's basketball team represented the University of Oklahoma in college basketball during the 1927–28 NCAA men's basketball season. The Oklahoma Sooners men's basketball team were a member of the National Collegiate Athletic Association's (NCAA) former Missouri Valley Intercollegiate Athletic Association at that time. The team posted an 18–0 overall record and an 18–0 conference record to finish first in the conference for head coach Hugh McDermott.

== Schedule ==
Date time, TV	Rank^{#}	Opponent^{#}	Result	Record	Site city, state
Regular season
December 16, 1927		Drake	W 42–24	1–0 (1–0)	Armory; Norman, OK
December 17, 1927		Grinnell	W 44–16	2–0 (2–0)	Armory; Norman, OK
January 5, 1928		at Iowa State	W 51–32	3–0 (3–0)	State Gymnasium; Ames, IA
January 7, 1928		at Grinnell	W 40–21	4–0 (4–0)	Grinnell, IA
, 1928		at Drake	W 38–24	5–0 (5–0)	Drake Fieldhouse; Des Moines, IA
January 13, 1928		Kansas	W 45–19	6–0 (6–0)	McCasland Field House; Norman, OK
January 14, 1928		Kansas State	W 40–29	7–0 (7–0)	McCasland Field House; Norman, OK
January 21, 1928		Oklahoma A&M	W 41–21	8–0 (8–0)	McCasland Field House; Norman, OK
, 1928		at Washington (MO)	W 28–20	9–0 (9–0)	Francis Gymnasium; St. Louis, Missouri
February 4, 1928		at Missouri	W 40–24	10–0 (10–0)	Rothwell Gymnasium; Columbia, MO
, 1928		Washington (MO)	W 34–33	11–0 (11–0)	McCasland Field House; Norman, OK
February 11, 1928		Missouri	W 34–33	12–0 (12–0)	McCasland Field House; Norman, OK
February 14, 1928		at Kansas	W 30–21	13–0 (13–0)	Hoch Auditorium; Lawrence, KS
February 18, 1928		Iowa State	W 37–17	14–0 (14–0)	McCasland Field House; Norman, OK
February 21, 1928		at Oklahoma A&M	W 37–36	15–0 (15–0)	Armory–Gymnasium; Stillwater, OK
February 24, 1928		at Kansas State	W 40–27	16–0 (16–0)	Nichols Hall; Manhattan, KS
February 25, 1928		Nebraska	W 38–36	17–0 (17–0)	Nebraska Coliseum; Lincoln, NE
March 3, 1928		Nebraska	W 43–29	18–0 (18–0)	McCasland Field House; Norman, OK
*Non-conference game. ^{#}Rankings from Coaches' Poll. (#) Tournament seedings in parentheses. All times are in Central Time..
