= 1928 Southern Conference men's basketball tournament =

1928 basketball tournament

- Classification: Division I
- Teams: 16
- Site: Municipal Auditorium; Atlanta, GA
- Champions: Mississippi Rebels (1st title)
- Winning coach: Homer Hazel (1st title)

1927–28 Southern Conference men's basketball standings
| | Conf. | | | | Overall |
| Team | W | | L | PCT | W | | L | PCT |
|---|---|---|---|---|---|---|---|---|
| Auburn | 12 | – | 1 | .923 | 20 | – | 2 | .909 |
| Mississippi A&M | 10 | – | 1 | .909 | 13 | – | 7 | .650 |
| North Carolina | 8 | – | 1 | .889 | 17 | – | 2 | .895 |
| Maryland | 8 | – | 1 | .889 | 14 | – | 4 | .778 |
| Kentucky | 8 | – | 1 | .889 | 12 | – | 6 | .667 |
| LSU | 7 | – | 3 | .700 | 14 | – | 4 | .778 |
| Virginia | 10 | – | 5 | .667 | 20 | – | 6 | .769 |
| Georgia | 8 | – | 5 | .615 | 12 | – | 10 | .545 |
| VMI | 5 | – | 5 | .500 | 7 | – | 6 | .538 |
| Alabama | 5 | – | 5 | .500 | 10 | – | 10 | .500 |
| Clemson | 5 | – | 7 | .417 | 9 | – | 14 | .391 |
| South Carolina | 4 | – | 7 | .364 | 8 | – | 12 | .400 |
| Mississippi † | 5 | – | 9 | .357 | 10 | – | 9 | .526 |
| NC State | 3 | – | 6 | .333 | 10 | – | 8 | .556 |
| Vanderbilt | 2 | – | 5 | .286 | 5 | – | 7 | .417 |
| Virginia Tech | 3 | – | 7 | .300 | 5 | – | 11 | .313 |
| Washington and Lee | 3 | – | 7 | .300 | 5 | – | 12 | .294 |
| Florida | 2 | – | 10 | .167 | 5 | – | 16 | .238 |
| Sewanee | 1 | – | 5 | .167 | 2 | – | 7 | .222 |
| Tulane | 3 | – | 15 | .167 | 3 | – | 15 | .167 |
| Tennessee | 0 | – | 8 | .000 | 0 | – | 12 | .000 |
† Southern Conference Tournament winner

The 1928 Southern Conference men's basketball tournament took place from February 24–February 28, 1928, at Municipal Auditorium in Atlanta, Georgia. The Mississippi Rebels won their first Southern Conference title, led by head coach Homer Hazel.

== Bracket ==
First round February 24
North Carolina | 38
LSU | 44
NC State | 35
Mississippi | 40
VMI | 36
Georgia | 47
Kentucky | 56
South Carolina | 40
Mississippi A&M | 44
Washington and Lee | 24
Virginia | 42
Alabama | 28
Georgia Tech | 50
Florida | 24
Auburn | 27
Clemson | 26

Quarterfinals; February 25
LSU | 28
Mississippi | 55
Georgia | 18
Kentucky | 33
Mississippi A&M | 44
Virginia | 28
Georgia Tech | 29
Auburn | 30

Semifinals; February 27
Mississippi | 41
Kentucky | 29
Mississippi A&M | 34
Auburn | 42

Finals; February 28
Mississippi | 31
Auburn | 30

* Overtime game

=== Championship ===
February 28

Mississippi 31, Auburn 30
| Pts: Cary Phillips & Robert Lee 8 | Pts: Jelly Akin 15 |

Municipal Auditorium, Atlanta, Georgia
Referees: Sutton

== All-Southern tournament team ==
| Player | Position | Class | Team |
|---|---|---|---|
| Ary Phillips | G | | Ole Miss |
| Dewitt Laird | G | | Ole Miss |
| Cary Phillips | F | | Ole Miss |
| Jelly Akin | F | | Auburn |
| Frank Dubose | C | | Auburn |

== See also ==
- List of Southern Conference men's basketball champions
