= Ary Phillips =

Personal information
- Born: August 11, 1906 Hattiesburg, Mississippi
- Died: January 8, 1955 (aged 48) Vicksburg, Mississippi
- Position: Guard

Career highlights
- All-American (1928); M-Club Hall of Fame

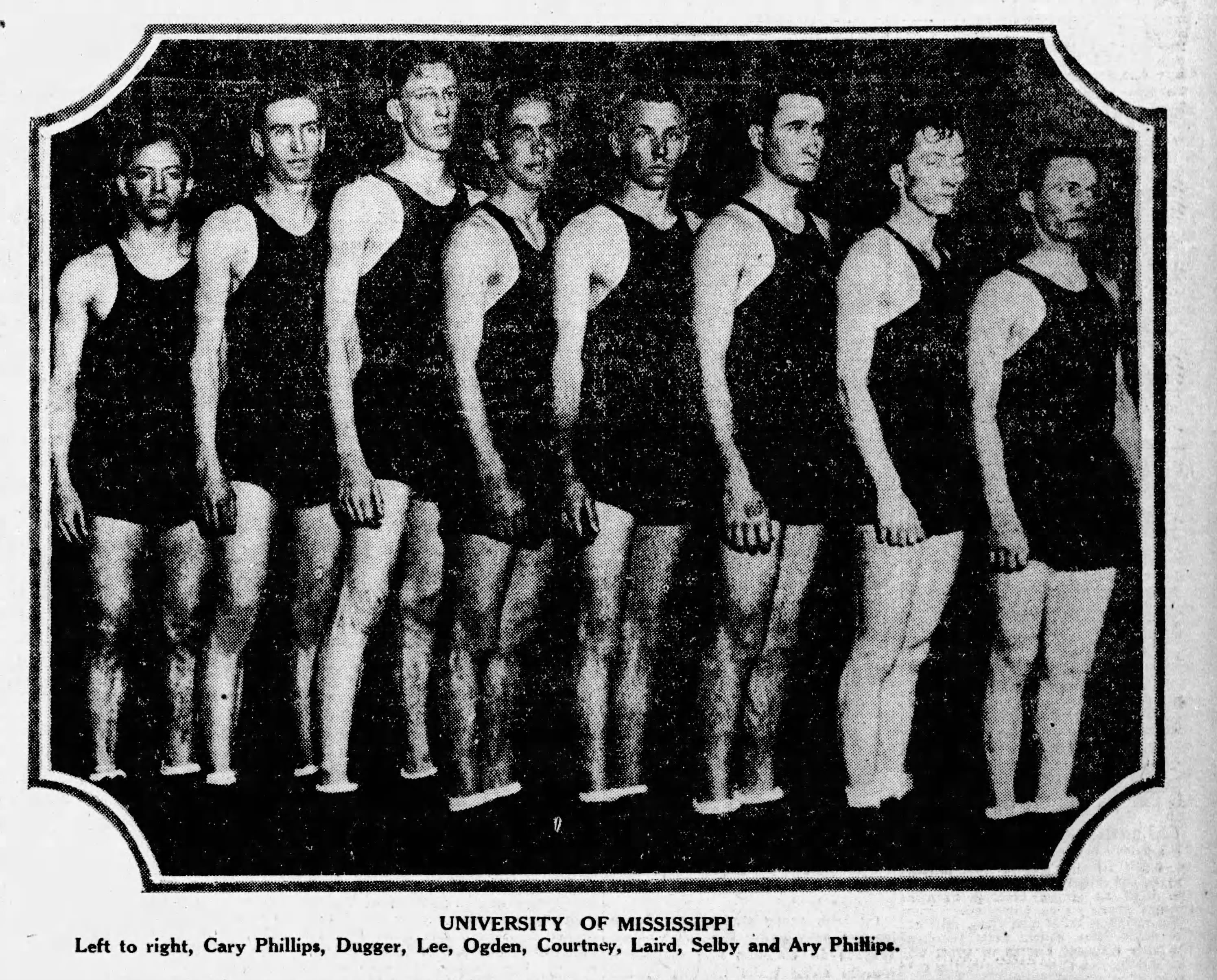
University of Mississippi. Left to right, Cary Phillips, Dugger, Lee, Odgen, Courtney, Laird, Selby, and Ary Phillips

Ary Caldwell Phillips (August 11, 1906 – January 8, 1955) was a college basketball player and Vicksburg businessman. He played for the Ole Miss Rebels with his twin brother Cary. He was the school's first All-American. He also played baseball, and is a member of the M-Club Athletic Hall of Fame.
