= 1927–28 Buffalo Bisons men's basketball team =

American college basketball season

1927–28 Buffalo Bisons men's basketball
- Conference: Independent
- Record: 8–8
- Head coach: Art Powell (13th season)

The 1927–28 Buffalo Bisons men's basketball team represented the University of Buffalo during the 1927–28 NCAA college men's basketball season. The head coach was Art Powell, coaching his thirteenth season with the Bisons.

== Schedule ==
Date time, TV	Opponent	Result	Record	Site city, state
	Buffalo Normal	W 32–23	1–0	Buffalo, NY
	Toronto	W 36–18	2–0	Buffalo, NY
	Dartmouth	L 31–34	2–1	Buffalo, NY
	Cornell	W 30–29	3–1	Buffalo, NY
	Hobart	W 24–16	4–1	Buffalo, NY
	at Clarkson	W 26–14	5–1	
	at Hamilton	W 34–29	6–1	Hamilton, NY
	at Colgate	L 17–52	6–2	Hamilton, NY
	Niagara	L 19–20	6–3	Buffalo, NY
	Rochester	L 20–24	6–4	Rochester, NY
	Alfred	W 36–21	7–4	Buffalo, NY
	at Niagara	L 23–33	7–5	Lewiston, NY
	Clarkson	W 35–29	8–5	Buffalo, NY
	at Hobart	L 26–32	8–6	Geneva, NY
	Rochester	L 21–40	8–7	Buffalo, NY
	Colgate	L 28–29	8–8	Buffalo, NY
*Non-conference game. (#) Tournament seedings in parentheses.
