= 1927–28 North Carolina Tar Heels men's basketball team =

American college basketball season

1927–28 North Carolina Tar Heels men's basketball
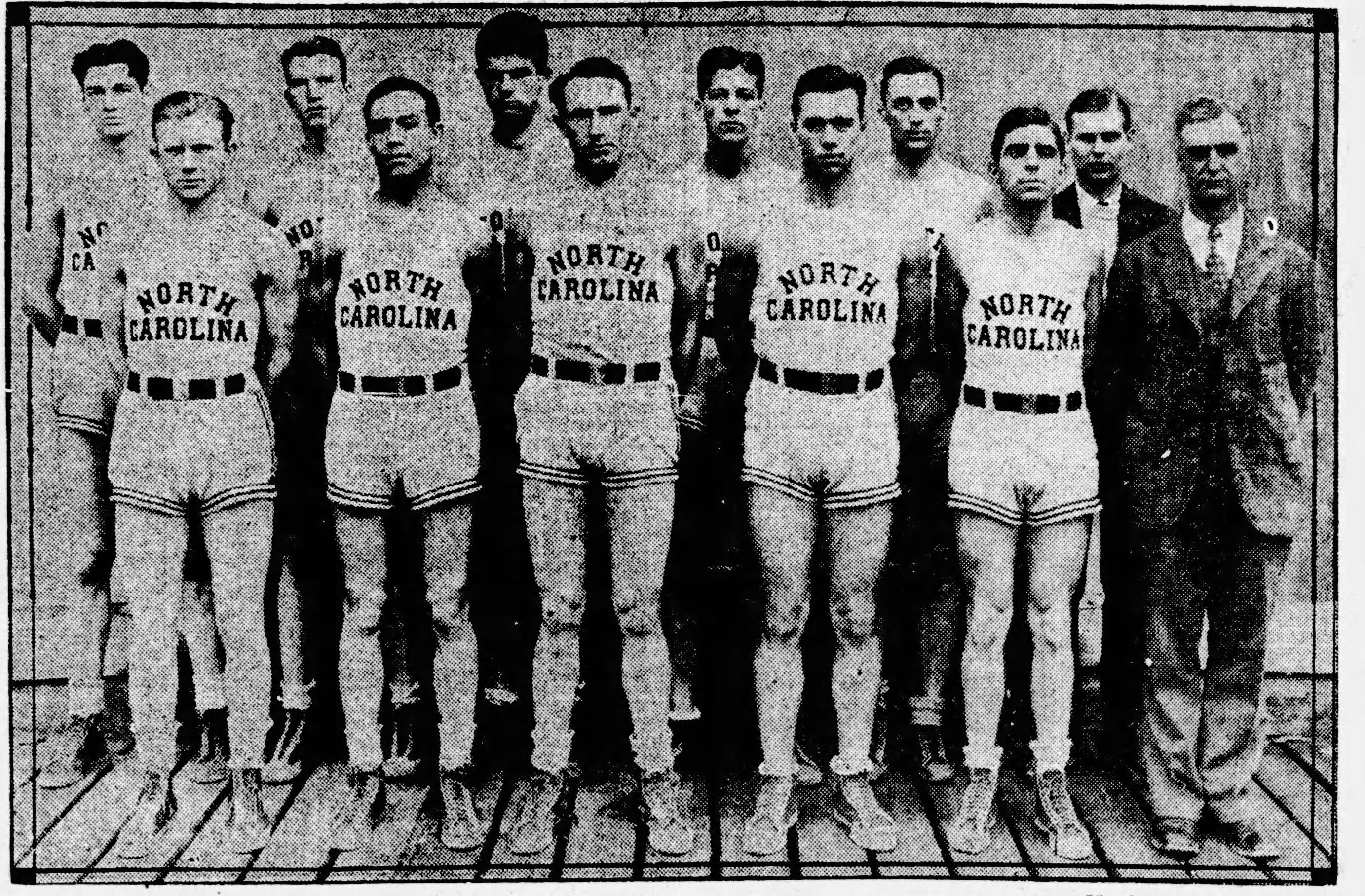
- 1927–28 North Carolina Tar Heels men's basketball team
- Conference: Southern Conference
- Record: 17–2 (8–1 SoCon)

1927–28 Southern Conference men's basketball standings
	Conf.				Overall
Team	W		L	PCT	W		L	PCT
Auburn	12	–	1	.923	20	–	2	.909
Mississippi A&M	10	–	1	.909	13	–	7	.650
North Carolina	8	–	1	.889	17	–	2	.895
Maryland	8	–	1	.889	14	–	4	.778
Kentucky	8	–	1	.889	12	–	6	.667
LSU	7	–	3	.700	14	–	4	.778
Virginia	10	–	5	.667	20	–	6	.769
Georgia	8	–	5	.615	13	–	10	.565
VMI	5	–	5	.500	7	–	6	.538
Alabama	5	–	5	.500	10	–	10	.500
Clemson	5	–	7	.417	9	–	14	.391
South Carolina	4	–	7	.364	8	–	12	.400
Mississippi†	5	–	9	.357	10	–	9	.526
NC State	3	–	6	.333	10	–	8	.556
Vanderbilt	2	–	5	.286	5	–	7	.417
Virginia Tech	3	–	7	.300	5	–	11	.313
Washington and Lee	3	–	7	.300	5	–	12	.294
Florida	2	–	10	.167	5	–	16	.238
Sewanee	1	–	5	.167	2	–	7	.222
Tulane	3	–	15	.167	3	–	15	.167
Tennessee	0	–	8	.000	0	–	12	.000
† Southern Conference Tournament winner

The 1927–28 North Carolina Tar Heels men's basketball team represented the University of North Carolina during the 1927–28 NCAA men's basketball season in the United States. The team finished the season with a 17–2 record.
