= Ole Miss Rebels men's basketball =

Men's basketball team that represents the University of Mississippi

2026–27 Ole Miss Rebels men's basketball team
- University: University of Mississippi
- First season: 1908–09; 118 years ago
- Athletic director: Keith Carter
- Head coach: Chris Beard; 4th season, 59–44 (.573)
- Location: Oxford, Mississippi
- Arena: The Sandy and John Black Pavilion at Ole Miss (capacity: 9,500)
- NCAA division: Division I
- Conference: SEC
- Nickname: Rebels
- Colors: Cardinal red and navy blue
- Student section: Club Red
- All-time record: 1,428–1,428 (.500)
- NCAA tournament record: 7–10 (.412)

NCAA Division I tournament Sweet Sixteen
- 2001, 2025

NCAA Division I tournament appearances
- 1981, 1997, 1998, 1999, 2001, 2002, 2013, 2015, 2019, 2025

Conference tournament champions
- SoCon: 1928 SEC: 1981, 2013

Conference division champions
- SEC West: 1997, 1998, 2001, 2007, 2010

Uniforms
Home	Away
Alternate	Alternate

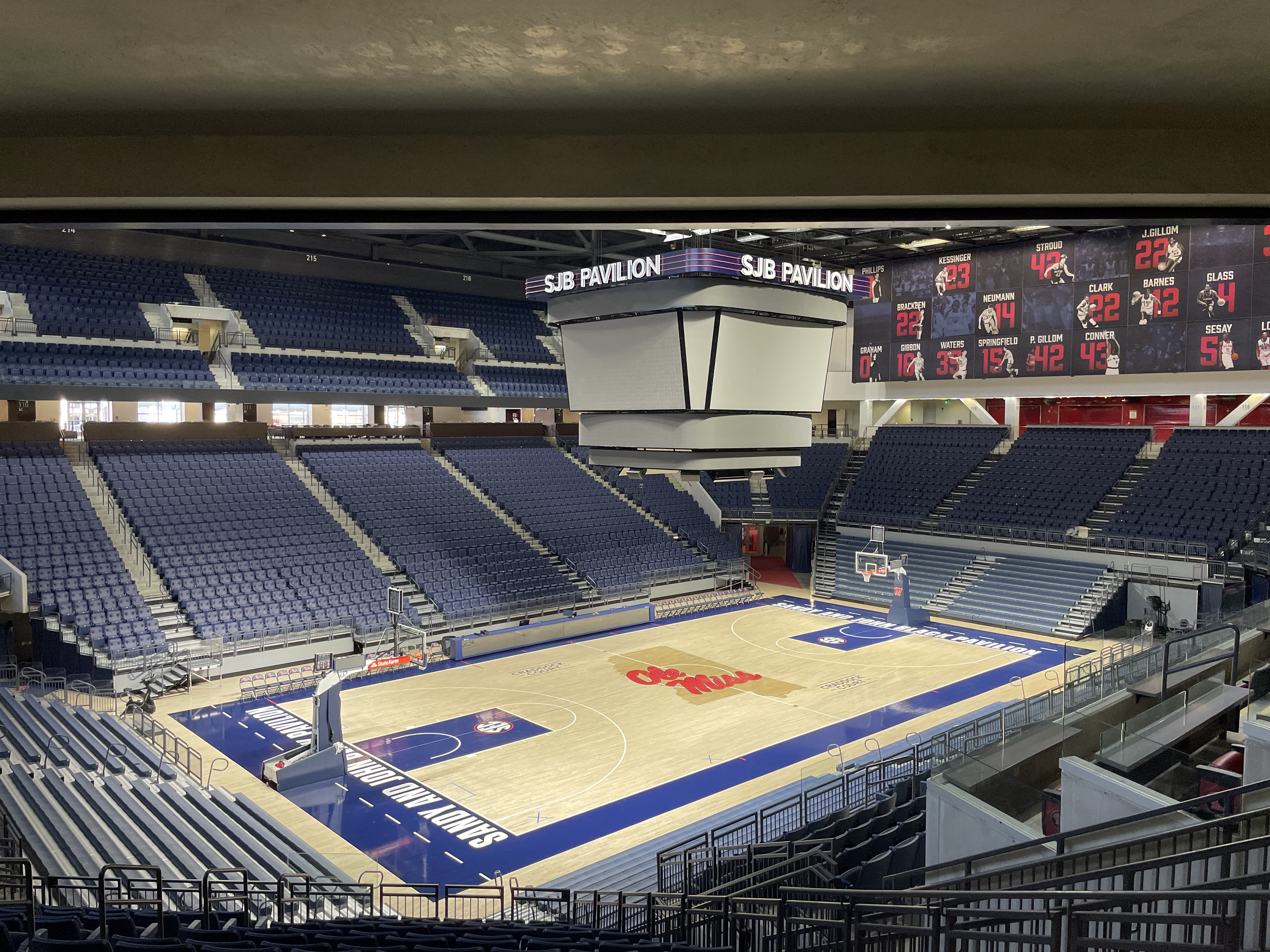
The Ole Miss Basketball Court inside the Pavilion

The Ole Miss Rebels men's basketball team represents the University of Mississippi in the sport of basketball. The Rebels compete in the NCAA Division I and the Southeastern Conference (SEC). They started the 2015–16 season playing home games at Tad Smith Coliseum on the university's Oxford campus, but played their final game in that facility on December 22, 2015. The Rebels opened a new on-campus arena, The Pavilion at Ole Miss, on January 7, 2016. The Rebels were led by 12-year head coach Andy Kennedy until his resignation on February 18, 2018. Tony Madlock, an assistant under Kennedy, served as the interim head coach for the remainder of the 2017–18 season. On March 15, 2018, the school hired former Middle Tennessee head coach Kermit Davis as the new head coach and was formally introduced on March 19. Davis was fired in his sixth season on February 24, 2023, after posting a 2–13 conference record with two games remaining on the schedule. Assistant coach Win Case took over as interim coach for the remainder of the season.

Ole Miss has appeared ten times in the NCAA tournament, most recently in 2025. The Rebels made their deepest tournament run in school history at the 2001 NCAA tournament and the 2025 NCAA tournament, reaching the Sweet 16 both seasons. The Rebels have participated in the National Invitation Tournament (NIT) 11 times. In 2008 and 2010, they made it to the NIT Semifinals at Madison Square Garden. The Rebels have won the SEC Western Division five times.

== Recent history ==
Rob Evans arrived in Oxford in 1992 as the school's first black coach in a revenue sport. He led the Rebels to only their second and third NCAA Tournament appearances in school history, in 1997 and 1998. These were also the first 20-win seasons in school history; the Rebels had been one of the few longstanding members of a "power conference" to have never tallied a 20-win season.

Evans left for Arizona State in 1998. His top assistant, Rod Barnes, took over at Ole Miss and compiled a record of 141–109 during his eight-year tenure. During his tenure, the Rebels reached the 1999, 2001, and 2002 NCAA Tournaments. The 1998–99 team notched the school's first-ever NCAA Tournament win, while the 2001 team advanced all the way to the Sweet 16. His tenure crested at that point, however, and he would not have another winning season after 2002.

Following the 2005–06 season, Ole Miss hired Andy Kennedy, and the Rebels tied for first place in the SEC West during the 2006–07 season. Led by the senior trio of Clarence Sanders, Bam Doyne, and Todd Abernethy, the Ole Miss men finished the year with a 21–13 record, including a 16–1 record at home inside Tad Smith Coliseum. They advanced to the second round of the NIT, before falling at Clemson. In his debut season with the Rebels, Kennedy was named the 2007 SEC Coach of the Year by the Associated Press after guiding Ole Miss, a preseason last-place pick in the SEC West, to its first division title and most wins since 2001.

In the 2012–13 season, Ole Miss won just their second SEC tournament title and made the NCAA tournament for the first time since 2002. Ole Miss also set a school record for most SEC wins in a season. Kennedy was again named SEC Coach of the Year. On February 23, 2013, Kennedy became the all-time winningest coach at Ole Miss.

== Active NBA players ==
- Terence Davis – Sacramento Kings

Sean Pedulla – Los Angeles Clippers

== Active international players ==
- Romello White (born 1998) - basketball player for Hapoel Eilat of the Israeli Basketball Premier League

== Postseason ==
=== NCAA tournament results ===
The Rebels have appeared in the NCAA tournament ten times. Their combined record is 7–10.

Year	Seed	Round	Opponent	Result
1981	No. 10	First Round	No. 7 Kansas	L 66–69
1997	No. 8	First Round	No. 9 Temple	L 40–62
1998	No. 4	First Round	No. 13 Valparaiso	L 69–70
1999	No. 9	First Round; Second Round	No. 8 Villanova; No. 1 Michigan State	W 72–70; L 66–74
2001	No. 3	First Round; Second Round; Sweet Sixteen	No. 14 Iona; No. 6 Notre Dame; No. 2 Arizona	W 72–70; W 59–56; L 56–66
2002	No. 9	First Round	No. 8 UCLA	L 58–80
2013	No. 12	First Round; Second Round	No. 5 Wisconsin; No. 13 La Salle	W 57–46; L 74–76
2015	No. 11	First Four; First Round	No. 11 BYU; No. 6 Xavier	W 94–90; L 57–76
2019	No. 8	First Round	No. 9 Oklahoma	L 72–95
2025	No. 6	First Round; Second Round; Sweet Sixteen	No. 11 North Carolina; No. 3 Iowa State; No. 2 Michigan State	W 71–64; W 91–78; L 70–73

=== NIT results ===
The Rebels have appeared in the National Invitation Tournament (NIT) 13 times. Their combined record is 15–13.

Year	Round	Opponent	Result
1980	First Round; Second Round	Grambling State; Minnesota	W 76–74; L 56–58
1982	First Round; Second Round	Clemson; Virginia Tech	W 53–49; L 59–61
1983	First Round; Second Round; Quarterfinals	Alabama State; South Florida; DePaul	W 87–75; W 65–57; L 67–75
1987	First Round	Southern Miss	L 75–93
1989	First Round	St. John's	L 67–70
2000	First Round; Second Round; Quarterfinals	Charlotte; SW Missouri State; NC State	W 62–45; W 70–48; L 54–77
2007	First Round; Second Round	Appalachian State; Clemson	W 73–59; L 68–89
2008	First Round; Second Round; Quarterfinals; Semifinals	UC Santa Barbara; Nebraska; Virginia Tech; Ohio State	W 83–68; W 85–75 ^{OT} W 81–72; L 69–81
2010	First Round; Second Round; Quarterfinals; Semifinals	Troy; Memphis; Texas Tech; Dayton	W 84–65; W 90–81; W 90–87 ^{2OT} L 63–68
2011	First Round	California	L 74–77
2012	First Round	Illinois State	L 93–96 ^{OT}
2017	First Round; Second Round; Quarterfinals	Monmouth; Syracuse; Georgia Tech	W 91–83; W 85–80; L 66–74
2021	First Round	Louisiana Tech	L 61–70

== All-Americans ==
Player	Position	Year(s)	Selectors
Ary Phillips	Guard	1928	Associated Press
B.L. "Country" Graham	Center	1938	Helms Athletic Foundation
Denver Brackeen	Center	1955	Helms Athletic Foundation, Associated Press
Joe Gibbon	Forward	1957	Helms Athletic Foundation, Associated Press, UPI
Don Kessinger	Guard	1964	Associated Press
Jack Waters (2)	Guard/Forward	1969, 1971	UPI
Johnny Neumann	Forward	1971	Helms Athletic Foundation, Associated Press, UPI, United States Basketball Writers Association, National Association of Basketball Coaches
John Stroud (2)	Forward	1979 & 1980	Associated Press
Carlos Clark	Forward	1982	Associated Press
Rod Barnes	Guard	1988	The Sporting News
Gerald Glass (2)	Forward	1989, 1990	
Ansu Sesay	Forward	1998	Associated Press, United States Basketball Writers Association, National Association of Basketball Coaches
Keith Carter	Guard	1999	Associated Press
Rahim Lockhart	Forward	2001	Basketball Times
Source:"Ole Miss All-Americas" (PDF). Ole Miss. Archived from the original (PDF) on January 10, 2015.
