= Drake Fieldhouse =

Athletic facility in Des Moines, Iowa

- Interactive map of Drake Fieldhouse
- Location: Des Moines, Iowa
- Coordinates: 41.604318°N 93.653948°W
- Owner: Drake University
- Operator: Drake University
- Capacity: 5,000

Construction
- Opened: 1926

Tenant
- Drake Bulldogs

The Drake Fieldhouse is an athletic facility of Drake University. It was built in 1926 as a companion to Drake's football stadium. It is the location for the athletic department offices, an indoor track, a tartan court area and equipment and locker rooms. It was formerly the home for the Drake Bulldogs men's basketball team until they moved to Veterans Memorial Auditorium. The first basketball game was played on January 4, 1927, when the Bulldogs lost 27-13 to Phog Allen's Kansas Jayhawks. The last regularly scheduled game was played during the 1961–62 school year. The last men's basketball game to be played there was on February 28, 1987, when Veterans Memorial Auditorium was not available so they had to play Southern Illinois in the conference tournament at the Fieldhouse.

Drake Fieldhouse has hosted many high school events, including the boys state basketball tournament around the time of World War II and the girl's indoor track tournament as recently as the mid 1990s.
