= 1917 Pittsburgh Panthers football team =

American college football season

1917 Pittsburgh Panthers football
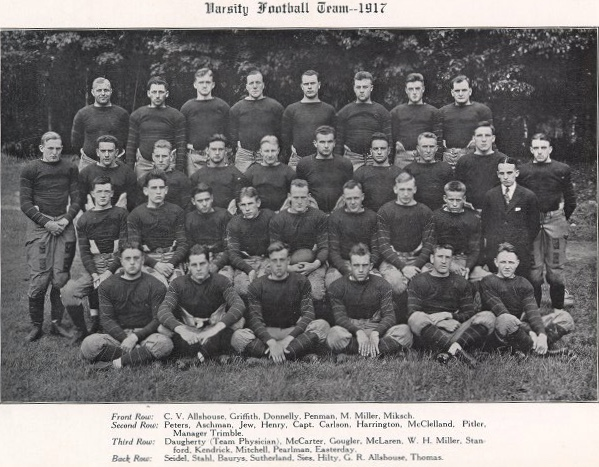
- Conference: Independent
- Record: 10–0
- Head coach: Pop Warner (3rd season)
- Offensive scheme: Double wing
- Captain: Doc Carlson
- Home stadium: Forbes Field

1917 Eastern college football independents records
	Conf.			Overall
Team	W	L	T	W		L		T
Pittsburgh		–		10	–	0	–	0
Williams		–		7	–	0	–	1
Yale		–		3	–	0	–	0
Princeton		–		2	–	0	–	0
Syracuse		–		8	–	1	–	1
Army		–		7	–	1	–	0
Rutgers		–		7	–	1	–	1
Penn		–		9	–	2	–	0
Brown		–		8	–	2	–	0
Fordham		–		7	–	2	–	0
Lehigh		–		7	–	2	–	0
Boston College		–		6	–	2	–	0
Swarthmore		–		6	–	2	–	0
Washington & Jefferson		–		7	–	3	–	0
Colgate		–		4	–	2	–	0
Harvard		–		3	–	1	–	3
New Hampshire		–		3	–	2	–	2
Dartmouth		–		5	–	3	–	0
Geneva		–		5	–	3	–	1
Penn State		–		5	–	4	–	0
Buffalo		–		4	–	4	–	0
NYU		–		2	–	2	–	3
Tufts		–		3	–	3	–	0
Carnegie Tech		–		2	–	3	–	1
Bucknell		–		3	–	5	–	1
Lafayette		–		3	–	5	–	0
Holy Cross		–		3	–	4	–	0
Rhode Island State		–		2	–	4	–	2
Carlisle		–		3	–	6	–	0
Columbia		–		2	–	4	–	0
Delaware		–		2	–	5	–	0
Cornell		–		3	–	6	–	0
Franklin & Marshall		–		2	–	6	–	0
Villanova		–		0	–	3	–	2
Temple		–		0	–	6	–	1

The 1917 Pittsburgh Panthers football team represented the University of Pittsburgh in the 1917 college football season. Led by coach Pop Warner, the Panthers won all ten games and outscored their opponents by a combined total of 260–31.

The Panthers were nicknamed "The Fighting Dentists" because during some rotations all eleven players on the field would be dentistry students. One of those players was Pitt Panthers legend Jock Sutherland.

== Schedule ==
Date	Opponent	Site	Result	Attendance	Source
September 29	at West Virginia	University Athletic Field; Morgantown, WV (rivalry)	W 14–9	4,000–5,000	
October 6	Bethany (WV)	Forbes Field; Pittsburgh, PA	W 40–0	4,000	
October 13	Lehigh	Forbes Field; Pittsburgh, PA	W 41–0	5,000	
October 20	Syracuse	Forbes Field; Pittsburgh, PA (rivalry)	W 28–0	10,000	
October 27	at Penn	Franklin Field; Philadelphia, PA	W 14–6	18,000	
November 3	Westminster (PA)	Forbes Field; Pittsburgh, PA	W 25–0		
November 10	Washington & Jefferson	Forbes Field; Pittsburgh, PA	W 13–10	25,000	
November 17	Carnegie Tech	Forbes Field; Pittsburgh, PA	W 27–0		
November 29	Penn State	Forbes Field; Pittsburgh, PA (rivalry)	W 28–6	20,000	
December 1	Camp Lee	Forbes Field; Pittsburgh, PA	W 30–0	3,433	

== Preseason ==
The 1916 football championship was given to the unbeaten Pitt Panthers by the Eastern critics. Edward Bushnell noted: "Under the present system of haphazard schedule making in the east, the awarding of the football championship is largely a matter of opinion. It is quite impossible to dodge the conclusion that Pittsburgh deserved the honor."

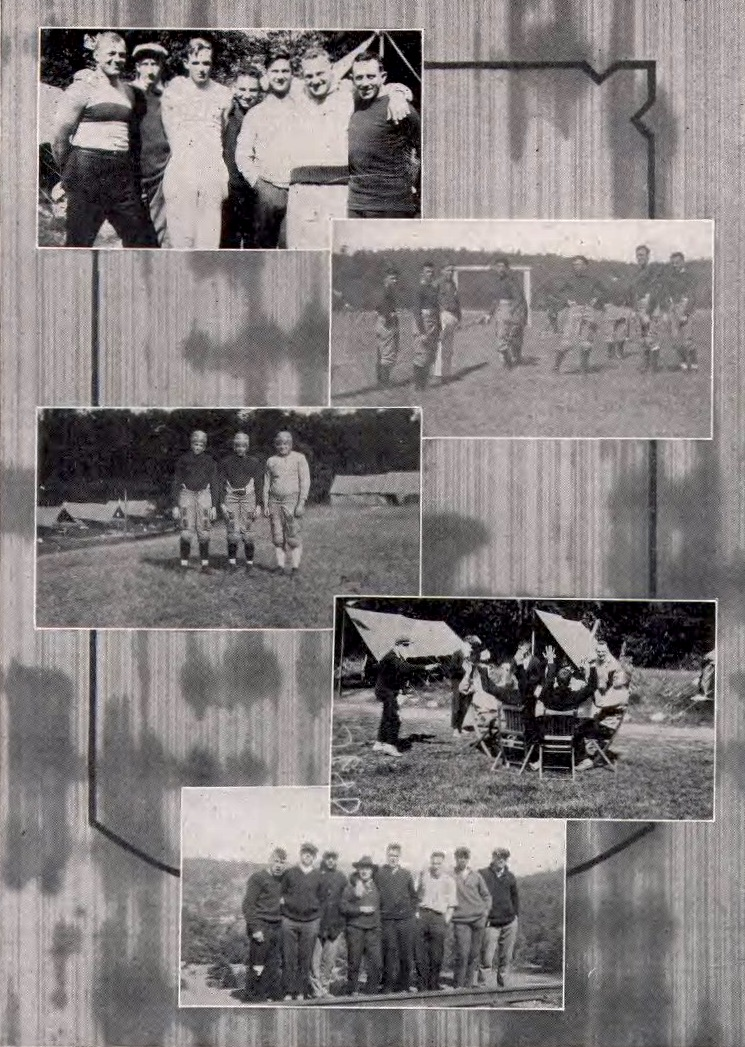
1917 Camp Hamilton

The Pitt Weekly reported: "The 1916 football season was not only a remarkable one in point of games won, but was also attended with great financial success, according to the Graduate Manager of Athletics. With all accounts paid, at the end of the football season, the assets over liabilities amounted to $17,124.00. This will more than take care of the development of non-profit producing sports, such as baseball, basketball, track, tennis, swimming and wrestling, and the Athletic Council will go into the 1917 football season with a nice balance. Owing to the adoption of the One-Year Residence Rule and the fact that Freshman teams will be equipped and provided with coaches in all branches of athletics in future, these expenses will be materially increased."

At the postseason banquet, H. Clifford Carlson was elected Captain and T. Lee Trimble, class of 1919, a student in the School of Mines, was chosen Student Manager of the football team for the 1917 season.

Only four starters (Bob Peck, Claude Thornhill, James Herron and Randall Soppitt) and three substitutes (Sam Friedlander, O.C. Ammons and Harry Stahlman) were lost to graduation. With 15 returning lettermen and Coach Warner at the helm, the alumni, fans and students expected another good season. Then on April 6, 1917 The Pittsburgh Post headline read: "Congress has declared that the United States is at war with the Imperial German government."

In mid-May The Pittsburgh Post noted: "In the list of men who have signed up for the hospital corps of the university appear the names of Hastings, DeHart, Sies, McLaren, Seidel, Morrow and several other of the well-known athletes on the Pitt teams. These men are expecting to be called out at any time, and if they go it will leave a big gap in the ranks of the candidates for the grid team next fall."

The May 30, 1917 The Pittsburgh Post reported that: "Football will be played by the leading colleges of the country next fall." Where hysteria and chaos reigned in athletic circles at the outbreak of the war between the United States and Germany, Pitt Graduate Athletic Manager Karl E. Davis said all was calm now and nearly every institution represented at the Graduate Athletic Managers' Association meeting expressed itself heartily in favor of playing football.

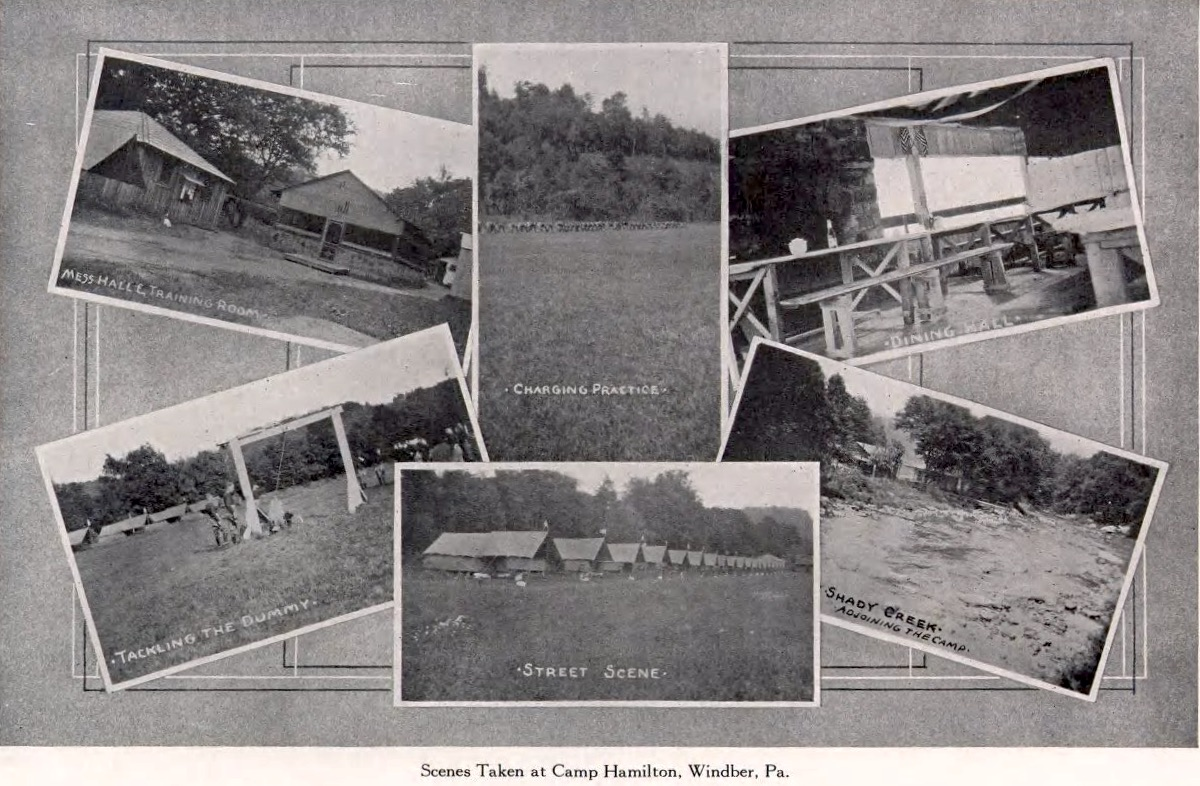
Preseason Camp Hamilton

On September 9, 1917 The Gazette Times noted: "The University of Pittsburgh football squad headed by Coach Glenn S. Warner and Captain Cliff Carlson, will leave tomorrow for Camp Hamilton, Windber, and the following day the first practice of the 1917 season will be held in the mountain retreat. The season promises to be an unusual one in many ways. Andy Hastings, Jimmy DeHart and Jim Morrow are now encamped at Allentown, PA, with the Pitt Base Hospital Unit. Of the great backfield quartet, only George McLaren remains, he escaping the draft on account of being under 21 years of age. Of the 33 men who formed the 1916 varsity squad only 11 men will be available." The Pittsburgh Post added: "The party going to camp today will number about 40 men, including the coach, camp physician, Manager Trimble and his two assistants, Frank Finley and Tom Ware, the student camp helpers and players. About 30 players will be in the party, they being the eligibles from last year's varsity and freshman teams under the one-year residence rule." The 1919 Owl Yearbook noted: "There was an uncertainty as to just how the game would be affected by the war. Several of the candidates who went to camp had enlisted and were expecting a call any time; and others had low numbers in the draft and were subject to call." On September 26, three days prior to the opening game with West Virginia, Gus Aschman, the projected starting quarterback was summoned to the Navy.

The Pitt Weekly summarized: "The University is going ahead with football this Fall although the clause "as usual" can hardly be added. The athletic authorities feel that football is needed at this time to help weld the students and alumni close to the University, to help train the boys physically for future war activities, to provide wholesome amusement for the undergraduates who are not in the service, and to help provide the proper "mental attitude" on the part of the public in general, which sports help bring about. Football, baseball, basketball and other forms of healthful amusement must go on. This is the position taken by President Woodrow Wilson and the Secretaries of the Navy and Army. It is a source of gratification to the athletic authorities of the University that their policy as regards the continuation of athletics has been adopted by the intercollegiate athletic world as a whole. The Council is really taking a great chance from a financial standpoint in having a football team this year. They ask for the undivided support of the "grads" to make it a success. The one year residence rule will be in effect. There will be no training table. These moves are made in strict accordance with recommendations of the Intercollegiate Association"

On Friday September 28, The Pittsburgh Press reported: "The University of Pittsburgh football squad broke camp and entrained for Morgantown, where they will conduct a raid on the formidable West Virginia aggregation."

== Coaching staff ==
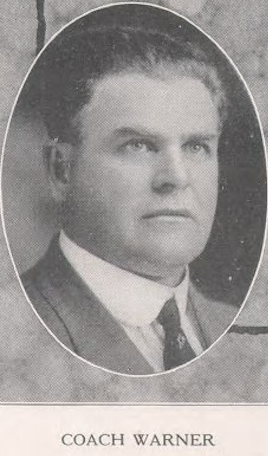
Glenn Warner

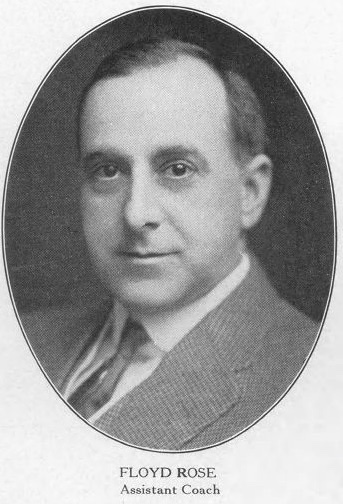
Floyd Rose

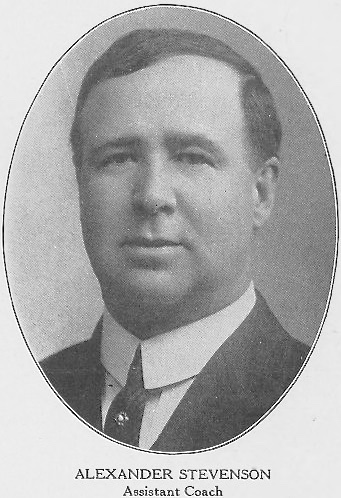
Alexander Stevenson

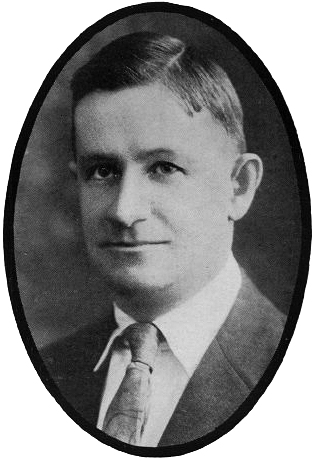
Andrew Kerr

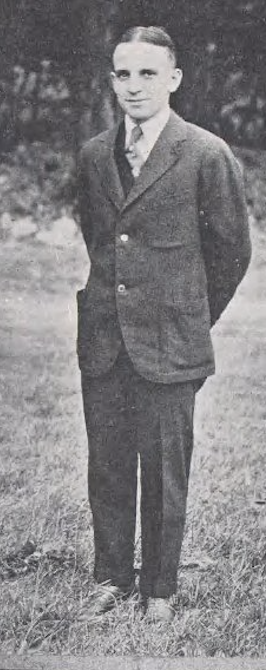
T. Lee Trimble

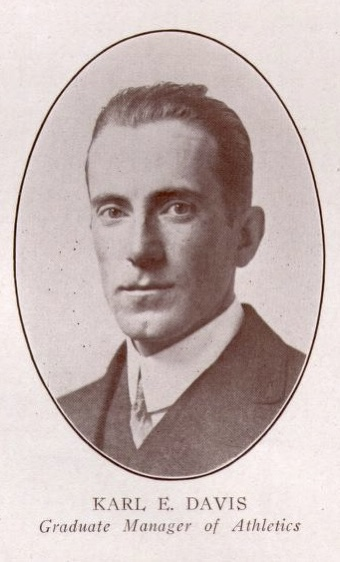
Karl E. Davis

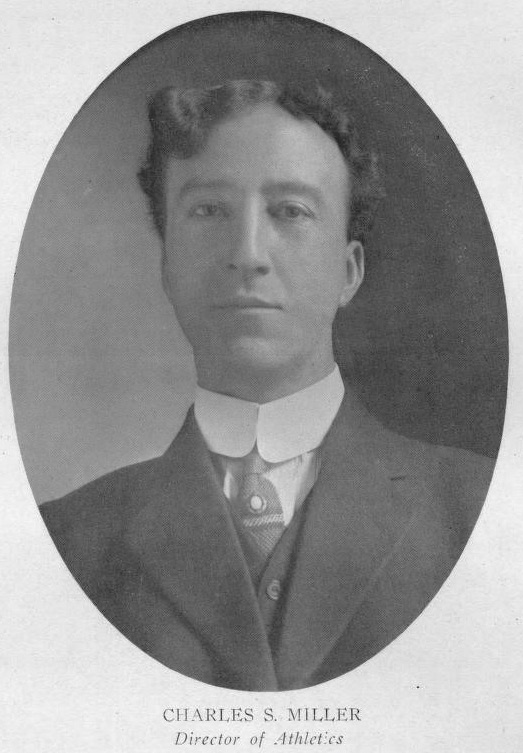
Charles S. Miller

1917 Pittsburgh Panthers football staff
Coaching staff: Glenn "Pop" Warner – Head coach; Floyd Rose – Assistant coach; Alexander Stevenson – Assistant coach; Andrew Kerr – Freshman Coach	Support staff: T. Lee Trimble – Student football manager; Karl E. Davis – Graduate manager of athletics; Charles S. Miller – Director of athletics

== Roster ==
1917 Pittsburgh Panthers football roster
Player	Position	Games	Height	Weight	Class	Prep School	Degree	Residence
H. Clifford Carlson*	end	9	5' 10"	170	1918	Bellefonte Academy	Doctor of Dental Surgery	Fayette City, PA
Roy A. Easterday*	end/halfback	8	5' 8"	148	1919	Lisbon H. S. (Ohio)	Economics	Lisbon, OH
Roscoe A. Gougler*	quarterback	7	5' 8"	156	1919	Harrisburg H. S.	College	Harrisburg, PA
William E. Harrington*	end	5	5' 8"	155	1918	Conway Hall	Associate Economics	Bentlyville, PA
Leonard Hilty*	tackle	4	5' 10"	183	1918	Peabody H. S.	Economics	Pittsburgh, PA
Thomas R. Kendrick Jr.	center	5	5' 8"	178	1918	Duquesne H. S.	College	Duquesne, PA
William D. McClelland*	fullback	8	5' 10"	161	1918	Pittsburgh Central H. S.	Economics	Pittsburgh, PA
George W. McClaren*	fullback	9	5' 9"	174	1919	Peabody H.S.	Economics	Pittsburgh, PA
Fred A. Seidel*	tackle	7	5' 11"	197	1919	Bellefonte Academy	Economics	Hazelton, PA
Dale H. Sies*	fullback/tackle	9	6' 1"	195	1919	Davenport H. S. (IA)	College	Davenport, IA
William H. Miller*	halfback	7	5' 7"	155	1918	Wyoming Seminary	Economics	Shenandoah, PA
Edward A. Stahl*	guard	9	5' 11"	184	1919	Bellefonte Academy	Economics	Scranton, PA
John B. Sutherland*	tackle	9	6' 2"	175	1917	Oberlin Academy	Doctor of Dental Surgery	Cooper Angus, Scotland
Clyde Mitchell	tackle	3	5' 10"	155	1919	Vandergrift H. S.	Dental	Mahaffey, PA
Leland Stanford	guard	4	5' 10"	175	1919	Bellefonte Academy	Dental	Sheffield, PA
Fred Henry*	end	7	5' 7"	139	1919	Allentown H. S.	Mines	Allentown, PA
William Baurys	guard	3	6' 2"	200	1920	Nanticoke H.S.	Medical School	Latrobe, PA
Charles V. Allshouse*	center	7	5' 11"	195	1919	Allegheny College	Dental	Versailles, PA
George R. Allshouse*	end	9	6'	176	1919	Tarentum H.S.	Dental	Versailles, PA
Richard Donnelly	end	1	6'	160	1920	Bellevue H. S.	Engineering	Pittsburgh, PA
W. J. Thomas	guard	4	5' 11"	210	1920	Lock Haven Normal	Economics	Weedville, PA
Isadore R. Pearlman*	end	6	6'	180	1919	Fifth Avenue H.S.	Dental	Pittsburgh, PA
Carl Miksch	halfback	3	5' 7"	150	1920	Charleroi H. S.	College	Charleroi, PA
Gus Ashman	quarterback	0	5' 10"	165	1920	Beaver H. S.	Economics	Beaver, PA
Murdoch Miller	halfback	1	5' 10"	160	1919	St. John's Military Academy	Dental	Navarre, OH
Robert Penman	halfback	3	5' 10"	165	1919	Grove City H. S.	Dental	Grove City, PA
Harry C. McCarter*	halfback	9	5' 11"	165	1920	Beaver Falls H. S.	Medical School	Beaver Falls, PA
Edward Jew	tackle	0	5' 10"	165	1920	South H. S.	College	Beaver, PA
David Pitler	quarterback	7	5' 7"	140	1919	Fifth Avenue H. S.	Dental	Pittsburgh, PA
Bernard Peters	end	2	5' 10"	160	1920	Tarentum H. S.	Mines	Tarentum, PA
W. J. Griffith	guard	0	5' 9"	170	1920	East Liberty Academy	Economics	Pittsburgh, PA
James W. McIntyre	center	2	5' 7"	199	1919	Central H. S.	Education	Pittsburgh, PA
* Letterman

== Game summaries ==
=== At West Virginia ===
Week 1: Pitt at West Virginia

Team	1	2	3	4	Total
• Pitt	0	14	0	0	14
West Virginia	0	0	2	7	9

- Date: September 29, 1917
- Location: University Athletic Field
  Morgantown, WVA
- Game start: 2:45 p.m.
- Game attendance: 4,000
- Referee: R. W. Maxwell (Swarthmore)

The defending champion Pitt eleven opened the 1917 season on the road at Morgantown, West Virginia against the West Virginia Mountaineers. The Mountaineers were led by second year coach Mont McIntire, who led them to a 5–2–2 record in 1916.

Richard Guy of The Pittsburgh Gazette Times reported: "Pittsburgh and West Virginia Universities resumed football relations this afternoon after a severance of several years, and the final result of the encounter, which marked the opening of the season for both teams, was in favor of Glenn Warner's pupils, 14 to 9."

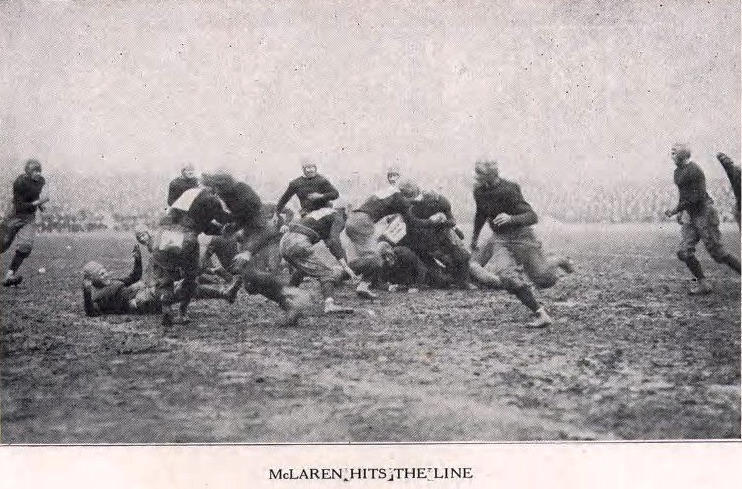
1917 Pitt fullback George McLaren up the middle

The Pittsburg Press noted: "Each team went into the game with a wholesome respect for the other's ability, and, while it was generally conceded that Pitt had the better chance of victory, West Virginia surprised everybody by coming back in the second half. Pitt was unable to gain consistently on line plays, but in the second quarter showed flashes of the strength that made the team the best in the country last fall."

Pitt opened the second quarter in possession of the ball on West Virginia's 30-yard line. "At this juncture, the Pitt team, which had been like 11 players working in different directions, pulled together and made an old time march up the field. McLaren finally went through a hole between Sutherland and Stahl for touchdown." Gougler kicked goal. Pitt 7 to WVA 0. "Soon afterwards, King fumbled a ball in his own territory, giving Pitt the ball on the West Virginia 35-yard line. This was an opportunity not to be overlooked and Pitt was soon knocking at the Mountaineers' goal line, (Roy) Easterday carrying it over." Gougler kick goal and Pitt led 14 to 0 at halftime.

"Fickle Fortune flirted to the West Virginia banner in the third period. King, the lanky halfback, stood on his own 32-yard line and booted the ball. (Pitt halfback Harry) McCarter let it hit the ground, which was baked hard. The ball bounded away from the Pitt 25-yard mark, where it hit, back toward the goal line. On the 1-yard line McCarter grabbed the elusive ball and in a nonce Capt. Bailey, of the home team, had grabbed him around the waist and McCarter was thrown back over the goal line for a safety." Score 14 to 2.

Early in the fourth quarter Pitt had possession on their 20-yard line and the West Virginia defense forced a punt situation. "(Dale) Sies dropped back to kick. Ice broke through, blocked the kick and recovered the ball for a touchdown. Rodgers kicked goal." Final score: Pitt 14 – West Virginia 9. West Virginia would finish the season with a 6–3–1 record.

The Pitt lineup for the game against West Virginia was H. Clifford Carlson (left end), Leonard Hilty (left tackle), John Sutherland (left guard), Edward Stahl (center), Dale Sies (right guard), Fred Seidel (right tackle), William Harrington and George R. Allshouse (right end), William Miller, William McClelland and David Pitler (quarterback), Roscoe Gougler (left halfback), Roy Easterday and Harry McCarter (right halfback), George McLaren (fullback). The first half was played in 11-minute quarters and the second half in 10-minute quarters.

=== Bethany ===
Week 2: Bethany at Pitt

Team	1	2	3	4	Total
Bethany	0	0	0	0	0
• Pitt	20	0	0	20	40

- Date: October 6, 1917
- Location: Forbes Field
  Pittsburgh, PA
- Game start: 3:00 p.m.
- Game attendance: 4,000
- Referee: R. W. Cadigan (Syracuse)

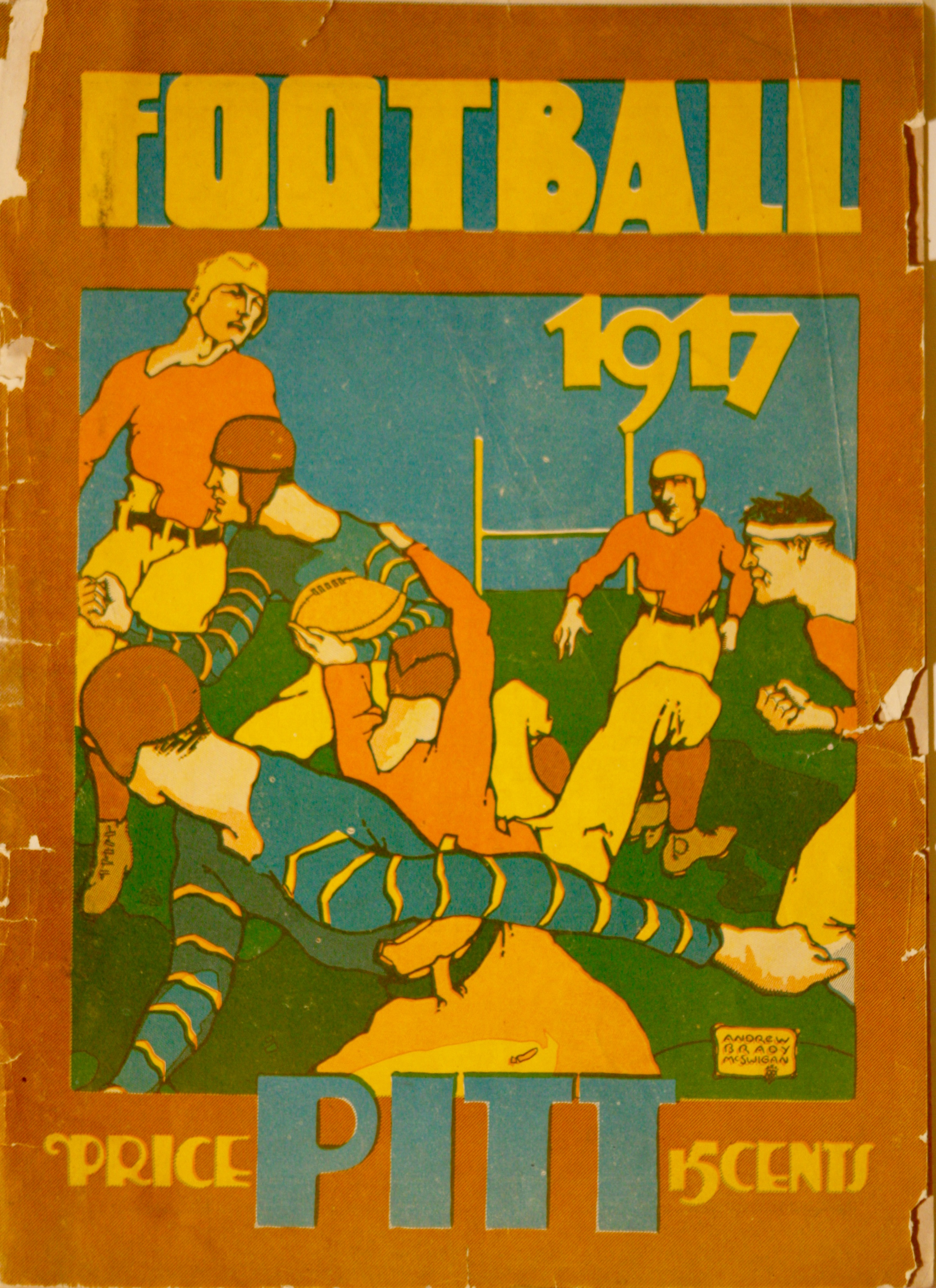
1917 University of Pittsburgh eighth annual football yearbook used as game programs

The Pittsburg Press hyped the game: "The University of Pittsburgh gridders will celebrate the opening of the home season tomorrow in a game with Bethany College. The Panhandle team has an aggressive collection of players and the initial game on the home grounds will be one of the big events of the year. Promptly at 3 the kickoff will be made. It is expected that the entire undergraduate body will be in attendance. In the student section will be the Pitt band, 50 strong, led by Prof. Holder, and its performance will add zest to the game. Two hundred lads from the high schools of Western Pennsylvania will be in attendance as guests of the University Athletic Committee. This particular feature will be continued through the succeeding games of the season."

The University of Pittsburgh Athletic Council published a sixty-four page Eighth Annual Football Yearbook as a game day program that sold for fifteen cents. Andrew Brady McSwigan illustrated the cover. Mr. McSwigan was president of Kennywood Amusement Park for 41 years.

After suffering through a two win and seven loss 1916 season under the tutelage of Fred Heyman, the Bison were looking to improve in 1917 with new coach Boyd Chambers. They finished the season with a 5–4 record.

The Pitt lineup had Ray Allshouse at right end, instead of William Harrington, and Harry McCarter at left halfback, replacing Roscoe Gougler. Gougler hurt his shoulder in the game with the Mountaineers and "Warner places a great value on this man and will groom him especially for the Lehigh game two weeks hence."

The Pittsburg Press was impressed with the outcome: "The University of Pittsburgh football team opened its home season yesterday at Forbes Field by defeating the Bethany College eleven, 40 to 0. There was a good sized crowd on hand to witness the opening game for all Pittsburgh football fandom was anxious to get a line on the Panther team, and all present came away convinced that Pitt will have one of the best teams that will play football this year."

The 1919 Owl Yearbook agreed: "The opening game of the season was with Bethany College and resulted in an easy 40–0 victory for the Panthers. Had Coach Warner desired to run up a big score the chances are that he could have done so. As it was, he was content to try out all the men and see what could be expected of them in the big games later. Pitt scored 20 points in the first quarter, when the double pass was worked to perfection. Bethany fought gamely in the second and third quarters and there was no scoring, the Pitt subs being in most of the time. In the last quarter the Panthers woke up and scored 20 more points, Capt. Carlson handling a forward pass for the last one. While the Varsity's playing in this game was far from finished, it was encouraging to the football fans and all predicted another great season."

Florent Gibson of The Pittsburgh Sunday Post was not impressed: "The Pitt football team looks like a lump of dough in the half-way stage between the mixing and the kneading out into pans. Also, this statement is made in spite of the fact--or maybe because of it-- that Pitt licked Bethany at Forbes Field yesterday afternoon, in the first home game of the season 40 to 0. Six touchdowns and four touchdown boots account for the total, but, except for the first quarter, in which half the total was chalked up, the Panther machine looked like a yeast-cake in rapid action. This formless, amorphous condition was far more in evidence yesterday than it was a week ago down in Morgantown, and to carry the figure of speech to its logical conclusion, the pessimistically inclined have some grounds for wondering if "Pop" Warner, master-baker, will ever turn out a fine assortment of crispy brown loaves – not loafers – bearing his well known trademark."

Pitt took the opening kick-off and advanced the ball by double passes to the Bethany 15-yard line. "George McLaren broke through center 14 yards and on the next play slid through the same place for touchdown. Sies failed at goal." The Pitt offense quickly regained possession and had the ball on the Bethany 18-yard line. "Roy Easterday on a cross buck, skirted to the three-yard line, a distance of 15 yards. McLaren tore through the Bethany forwards for touchdown. Sies kicked the resultant goal." On Pitt's next march to the end zone Bethany almost intercepted a pass. "Latto had it in his grasp but failed to hold the ball. On the next play Harry McCarter projected a pass to Allshouse for a 30 yard gain reaching the Bethany 17-yard line. Easterday, on another criss-cross from McCarter, ran 17 yards for the touchdown. Sies kicked goal." Pitt led 20 to 0.

In the fourth quarter, David Pitler quarterbacked the first string. "From the six yard line, Pitler, on a straight play through center, ran over for a touchdown. Sies failed at goal." On Pitt's next possession, Pitler scored on a 35 yard scamper. Sies kicked goal and the score was 33–0. Pitler finished the scoring with a 40 yard touchdown pass to Cliff Carlson with less than five minutes remaining. Sies kicked goal and Pitt won 40 to 0.

The lineup for the game against Bethany was H. Clifford Carlson (left end), Leonard Hilty (left tackle), John Sutherland (left guard), Edward Stahl (center), Dale Sies (right guard), Fred Seidel (right tackle), Ray Allshouse (right end), William Miller (quarterback), Harry McCarter (left halfback), Roy Easterday (right halfback), and George McLaren (fullback). Substitutes appearing in the game for Pitt were Fred Henry, W. J. Thomas, William Baurys, Thomas Kendrick, David Pitler, Robert Penman and William McClelland. The game was played in 12-minute quarters.

=== Lehigh ===
Week 3: Lehigh at Pitt

Team	1	2	3	4	Total
Lehigh	0	0	0	0	0
• Pitt	14	7	6	14	41

- Date: October 6, 1917
- Location: Forbes Field
  Pittsburgh, PA
- Game start: 3:30 p.m.
- Game attendance: 5,000
- Referee: M. J. Thompson (Georgetown)

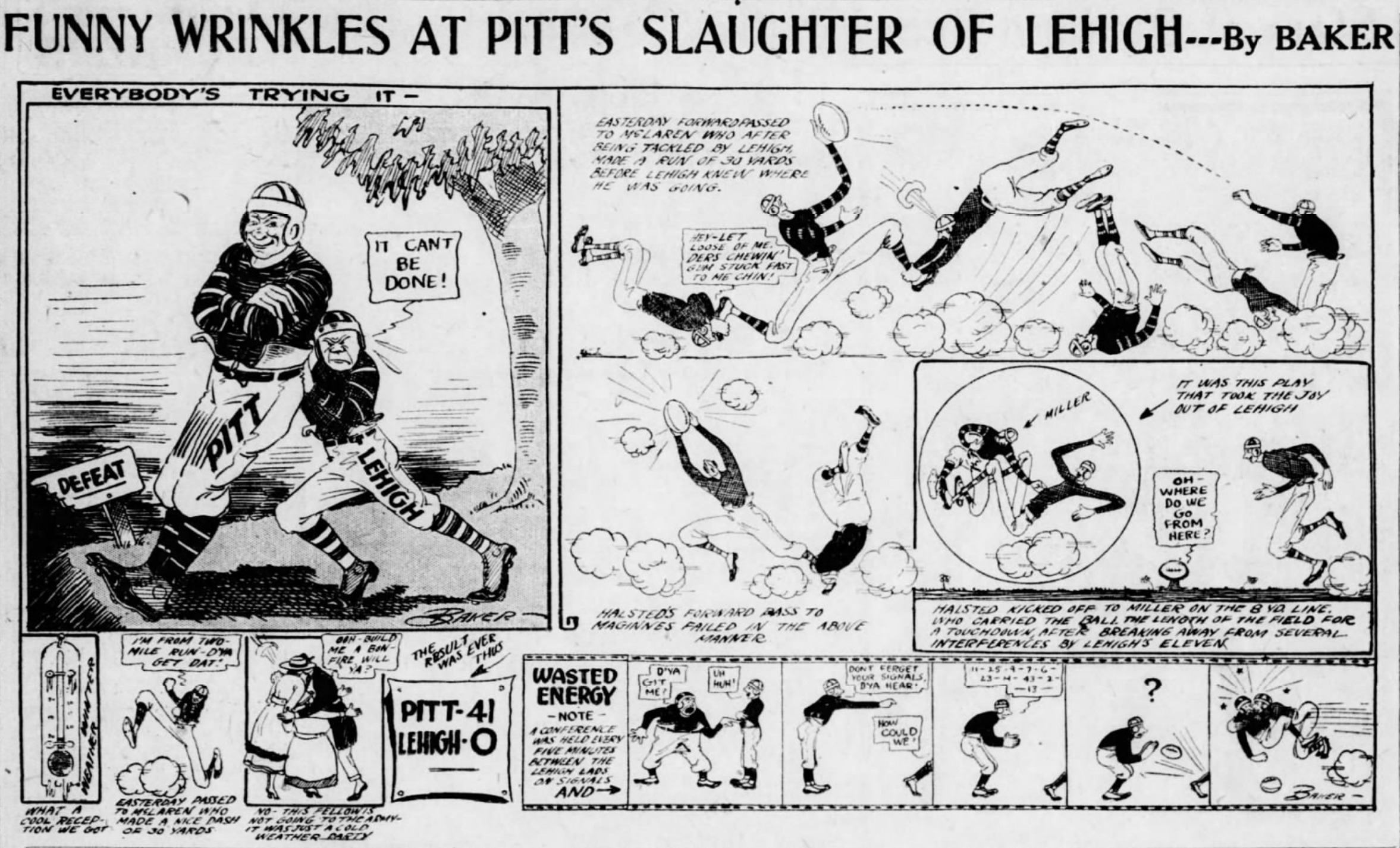
Cartoonist's depiction of 1917 Pitt vs. Lehigh game

On October 13, 1917, the Lehigh University Brown and White football team from Bethlehem, PA came west to battle the Pitt eleven for the first time. Lehigh was coached by Tom Keady who had compiled a respectable 34–12–1 record in his first five seasons. Lehigh came into this game with a 2–0 record, having beaten both the 7th Infantry and Ursinus College squads.

Florent Gibson of The Pittsburgh Post was wary of the Lehigh squad: "This afternoon's game will be between the University of Pittsburgh and Lehigh University. We have the effrontery to outburst with the announcement that, in our humble opinion, it will be some game, and a mighty critical one for the Panthers. Down in our heart we cherish the belief that Pitt will win, but we are prepared for the worst. (Roscoe) Gougler will start today as good as new and it is well that he does. Gawsh, how he is needed."

Sunday morning Mr. Gibson was humbled: "It is with mixed feelings, dear readers, that we chronicle the Pitt-Lehigh game that was long and tiresome in the happening at Forbes Field yesterday afternoon. We are glad that Pitt showed a really splendid brand of hard and cohesive football in sweeping Lehigh's hard-bitten but none too enterprising eleven off its feet, and that yesterday's performance augurs well for Pitt's continued success on the gridiron this fall. But, we are saddened at being made such a vapid liar by the size of the score. We plead guilty to predicting that Pitt would have a hard game yesterday, and that Lehigh was just as likely as not to twist the Panther's tail. And, though we missed the mark as wide as Christian charity, we do contend that it was a good guess and a perfectly logical prediction, but those Lehigh players – drat 'em – wouldn't hold up for us. That "Souse Beslem" bunch performed like somnambulists or hypnotic subjects in a trance and let the Blue and Gold warriors run around, over, under and through them, as someone once remarked, to the tune of six touchdowns and five goals therefrom, or 41 points in all."

The Pittsburgh Gazette Times reported: "Foxy Miller cast a gloom over the Lehigh camp right at the outset of the contest. This towhead caused consternation among the visiting players by taking the first kick-off and running through them 94 yards for touchdown." (Roscoe) Gougler added the first of his three goals. Later in the first quarter, "from the two-yard line (George) McLaren shoved the ball across for the second touchdown. Gougler kicked goal. Score; Pitt 14, Lehigh 0."

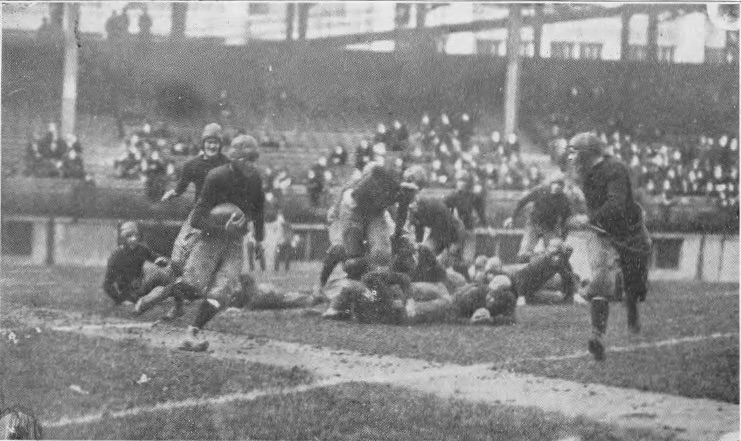
1917 Pitt halfback Skip Gougler around the end

In the second quarter Pitt gained possession on the Lehigh 47-yard line. "(Roy) Easterday broke away on a double pass and ran 25 yards. Then Gougler tore through the forwards to within one foot of touchdown. He turned the left flank on the next play for touchdown. He kicked goal." Later in the quarter, Lehigh worked the ball to the Pitt 12-yard line. "Then Herrington, standing on the 25-yard mark, essayed a drop-kick for a field goal. It was a poor attempt." The halftime score read 21–0.

Pitt took the second half kick-off and Easterday, Gougler and McLaren advanced the ball methodically to the 1-yard line. "McLaren was sent through center for touchdown. Gougler failed at goal." Pitt led 27–0.

The Pitt offense was on another sustained drive at the beginning of the fourth quarter and finally had first down on the Lehigh 10-yard line. "On two tries at right tackle, McLaren totaled 5 yards, and then passed to Easterday, criss-cross, and Easterday circled left end for the five remaining yards and a touchdown. (Cliff) Carlson kicked the goal. Pitt 34 – Lehigh 0." Minutes later, Pitt was on the Lehigh nine-yard line. "As (Harry) McCarter went around right end he fumbled and (Dale) Sies fell upon the ball behind the goal line for touchdown. Carlson kicked goal. Score – Pitt, 41; Lehigh, 0."

The Pitt lineup for the game against Lehigh was H. Clifford Carlson (left end), Leonard Hilty (left tackle), John Sutherland (left guard), Edward Stahl (center), Dale Sies (right guard), Fred Seidel (right tackle), Roy Allshouse (right end), William Miller (quarterback), Roscoe Gougler (left halfback), Roy Easterday (right halfback) and George McLaren (fullback). Substitutes appearing in the game for Pitt were Fred Henry, W. J. Thomas, William Baurys, Thomas Kendrick, David Pitler, Robert Penman, William McClelland, Harry McCarter, Vance Allshouse, I. R. Pearlman and B. Peters. The first half was played in two 15-minute periods and the second half was played in two 12-minute periods.

=== Syracuse ===
Week 4: Syracuse at Pitt

Team	1	2	3	4	Total
Syracuse	0	0	0	0	0
• Pitt	7	7	7	7	28

- Date: October 20, 1917
- Location: Forbes Field
  Pittsburgh, PA
- Game start: 3:00 p.m.
- Game attendance: 10,000
- Referee: Nathan A. Tufts (Brown)

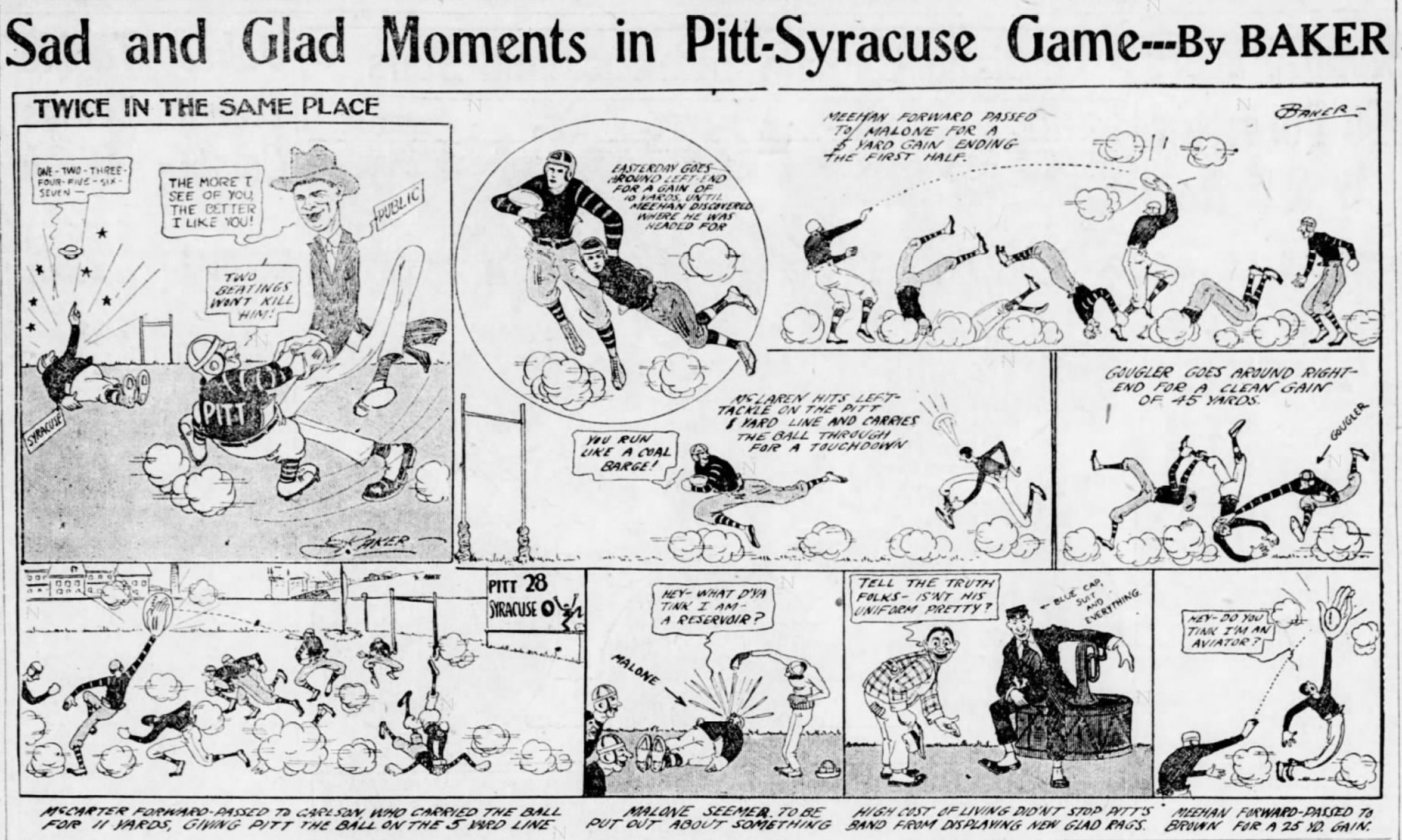
Cartoonist's impression of the 1917 Pitt vs. Syracuse game

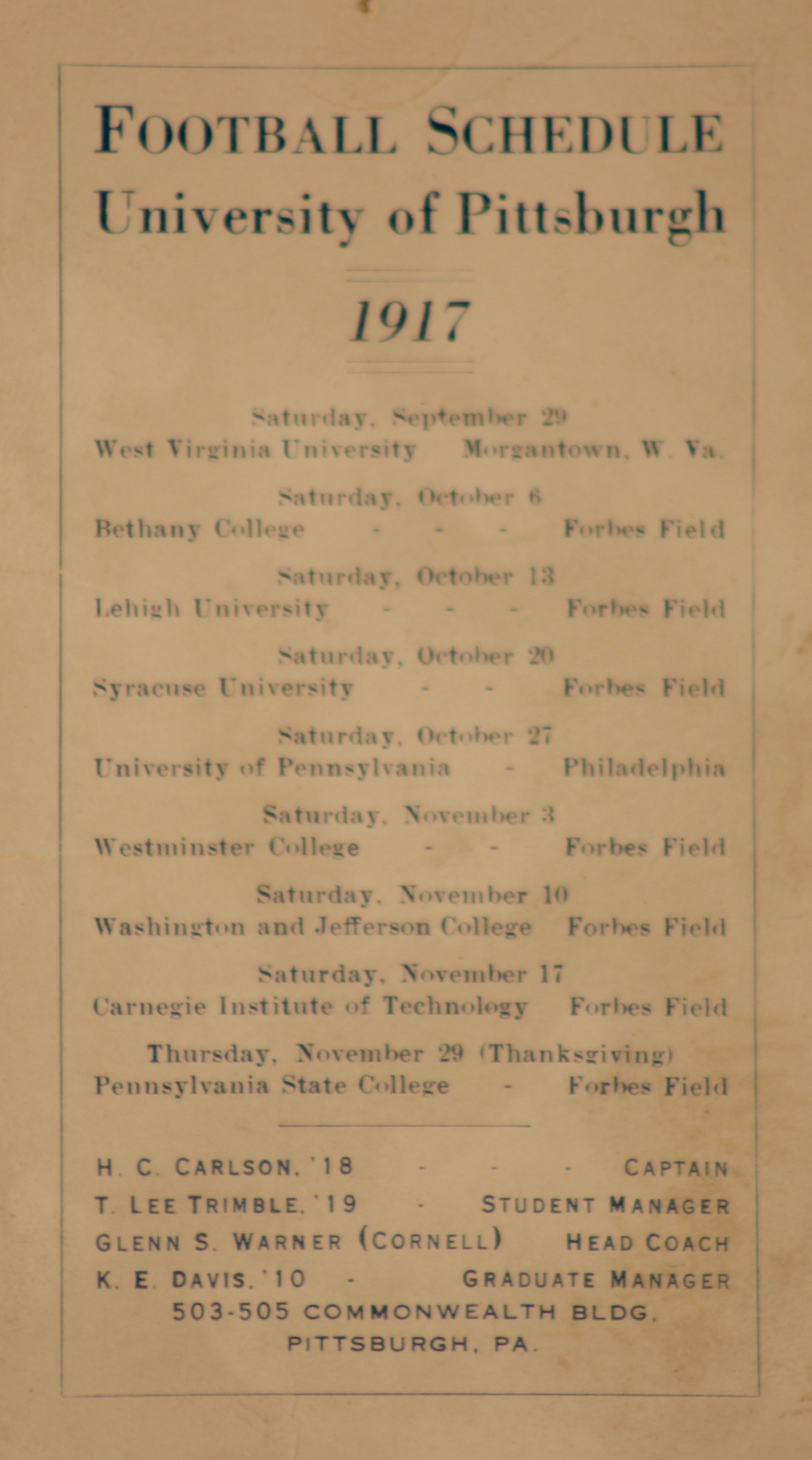
1917 Pitt Panther football pocket schedule

Ralph S. Davis of The Pittsburgh Press set the stage: "Forbes Field is the scene of real "major league" football today, the attraction being the gridiron battle between the Pitt Panthers and the big Orange team from Syracuse University. This is the first appearance of the Salt City eleven in Pittsburgh. They met Pitt on their own field last fall, and were given a severe trouncing, the beating coming in the nature of a big surprise to the "talent." They boast of a team possessing strength in every department except substitutes. Syracuse showed its strength and standing a week ago, when it handed the much-touted Rutgers combination, coached by the versatile Foster Sanford, a 14–10 defeat."

When the starting lineups were announced both teams were missing key players. Pitt started Bill McClelland at quarterback for the injured William Miller and Vance Allshouse was at tackle for the injured Fred Seidel. Syracuse's 1917 All-American tackle Alfred Cobb was nursing injuries from the Rutgers game and did not play.

Richard Guy of The Pittsburgh Gazette Times was cautious in his praise: "The Syracuse University football warriors, equipped with a highly developed attack, and a dogged determination, albeit clean and sportsmanlike in their playing, were defeated by the forces of the University of Pittsburgh in their annual match yesterday afternoon at Forbes Field by a 28 to 0 score. A crowd, estimated at 10,000 saw the contest, which brought out two teams equal in one thing, attack, and both lacking in another, strong defense."

George W. Shusler of The Pittsburg Press was impressed: "Glenn Warner's 11-cylinder steam roller, otherwise known as the Pitt football team, steamed all over Forbes Field yesterday afternoon, with the result that Syracuse University's football team was crushed to the tune of 28 to 0. The game was fairly full of spectacular playing and each score was the result of splendid teamwork on the part of the Panther players. You have to hand it to "Pop" Warner, for no matter how tough the opposition, the Pitt team appears just right, as good as they have to be and pointed to the minute. For a coach to have a world-beating eleven robbed of a flock of stars by graduation and enlistment and turn in and build up with green material, build it up to a point that it can just about take the measure of any team that it is stacked up against, is worthy of all the commendation possible."

Syracuse took the opening kickoff and advanced the ball to the Pitt 17-yard line. "Here the Pitt forward line, which has stopped everything it has faced in the last two years, braced and took the ball away from the visitors." The Pitt offense went to work and advanced the ball to the Syracuse 35-yard line. "Standing on the 35-yard line (Roscoe) Gougler failed at a goal from placement. Syracuse was offside, however, and was penalized." Five plays later "McLaren shoved through center for the touchdown. Gougler kicked goal." Pitt led 7 to 0 at the end of the first period.

Early in the second quarter, Syracuse advanced the ball deep into Pitt territory to the eight yard line. Florent Gibson of the Daily Post described the play thusly: "Finally Pitt held, and then, on the very first play, McLaren slipped through a suddenly open hole 'twixt center and guard. Syracuse, playing for a punt, failed to anticipate such a move, and McLaren, once loose, omitted his usual stumble. He ran 92 yards for a touchdown, aided by fortune or something like that. Of course, we do not mean to detract from McLaren's wonderful feat, but, gosh hang it, he has tried to do the same thing time and time again, and great player that he is, he never did anything so fortuitous as that before" The Philadelphia Evening Public-Ledger had a different view: "On the defense McLaren was a wonder, his interference was good, he always blocked the tacklers on end runs and when he carried the ball, he was just as harmless as a runaway freight train. McLaren stands alone as the one best bet in the fullback position and has everybody else stopped. He bucks the line like Ted Coy and has a faculty of keeping his feet even after he has been tackled. He always is good for a yard or so after he has been stopped. In the second period Saturday, McLaren took the ball and plunged through left guard. He was tackled, but the man was shaken off and the stocky fullback kept on going. Another player grasped him, but he too, was shaken off. This gave McLaren a clear field and he surprised the multitude by showing a burst of speed which carried him down the field like Hourless ran away from Omar Khayam." Gougler kicked the goal after and Pitt led 14 to 0 at halftime.

In the third quarter, Dale Sies blocked a Syracuse punt and Leonard Hilty recovered on the Syracuse 23-yard line. Four plays moved the ball to the Syracuse five-yard line. "After a two yard gain at center, McLaren came back with a thrust at right tackle. He shoved the ball across the goal line. Sies kicked goal." Pitt led 21 to 0 at the end of three quarters.

"The final score came unexpectedly late in the final period. Pitt had worked the ball up to within the 10-yard line and lost it on downs." "Due credit must be given an unknown and unhonored sub, (Carl) Miksch, for his quick presence of mind and deft scooping of the ball, like a bear gathering honey. Miksch's opportunity came when (Syracuse fullback) Malone, running left end from kick formation, fumbled on the 18-yard line. The ball was loose and bounding. Miksch took it on the run and raced over, under the goal posts." "Carlson added the final point to the score by kicking the resultant goal." Final score Pitt 28 to Syracuse 0. Syracuse finished the season 8–1–1.

The Pitt lineup for the game against Syracuse was H. Clifford Carlson (left end), Leonard Hilty (left tackle), John Sutherland (left guard), Edward Stahl (center), Dale Sies (right guard), Vance Allshouse (right tackle), Roy Allshouse (right end), William McClelland (quarterback), Roscoe Gougler (left halfback), Roy Easterday (right halfback) and George McLaren (fullback). Substitutes appearing in the game for Pitt were William Thomas, William Baurys, Thomas Kendrick, I. R. Pearlman, Clyde Mitchell, David Pitler, Harry McCarter and Carl Miksch. The game was played in 15-minute quarters.

=== At Penn ===
Week 5: Pitt at Penn

Team	1	2	3	4	Total
• Pitt	0	0	7	7	14
Penn	0	0	0	6	6

- Date: October 27, 1917
- Location: Franklin Field
  Philadelphia, PA
- Game start: 2:00 p.m.
- Referee: Nathan Tufts (Brown)

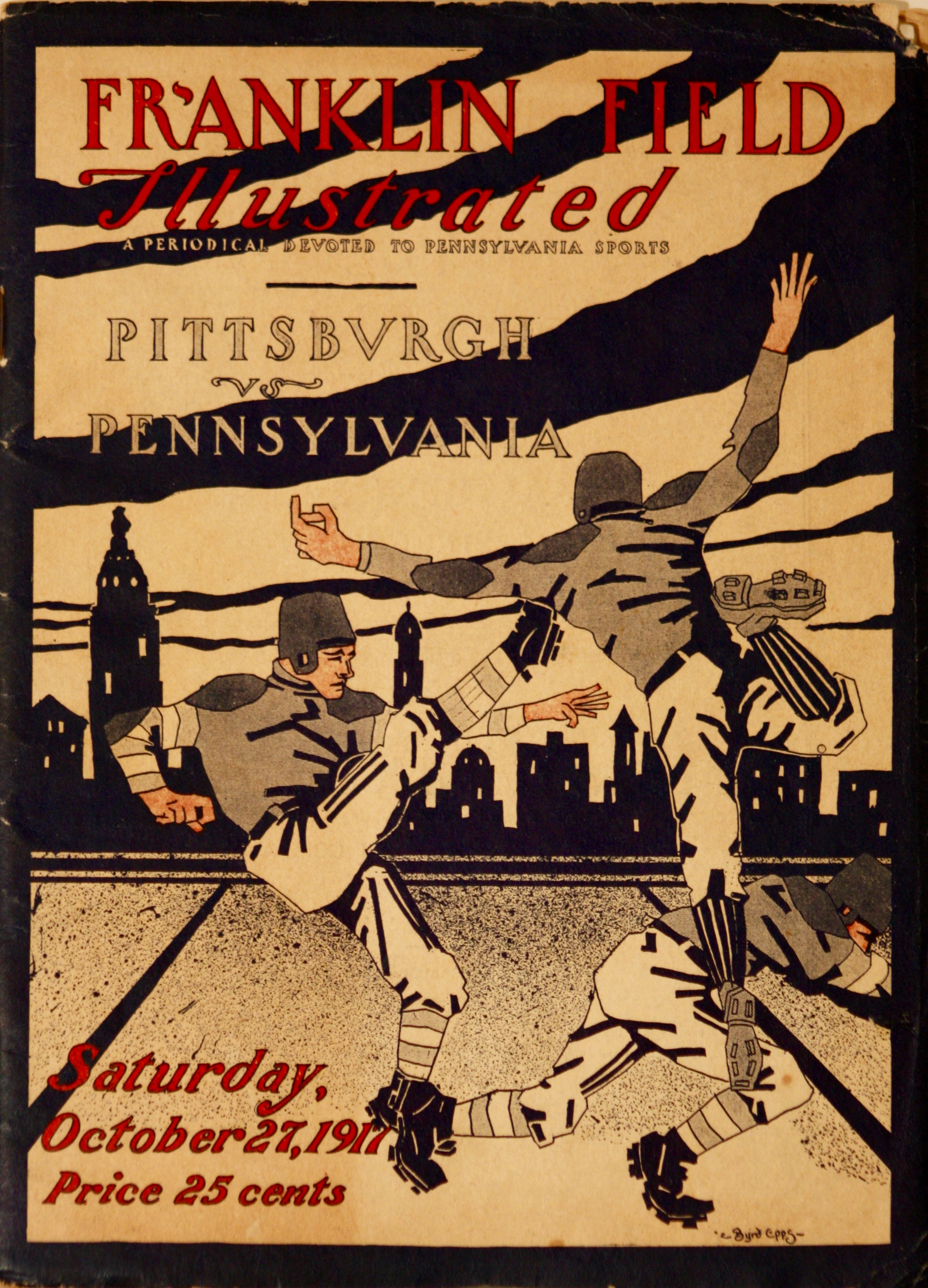
1917 Franklin Field Illustrated for the Pennsylvania vs. Pitt game

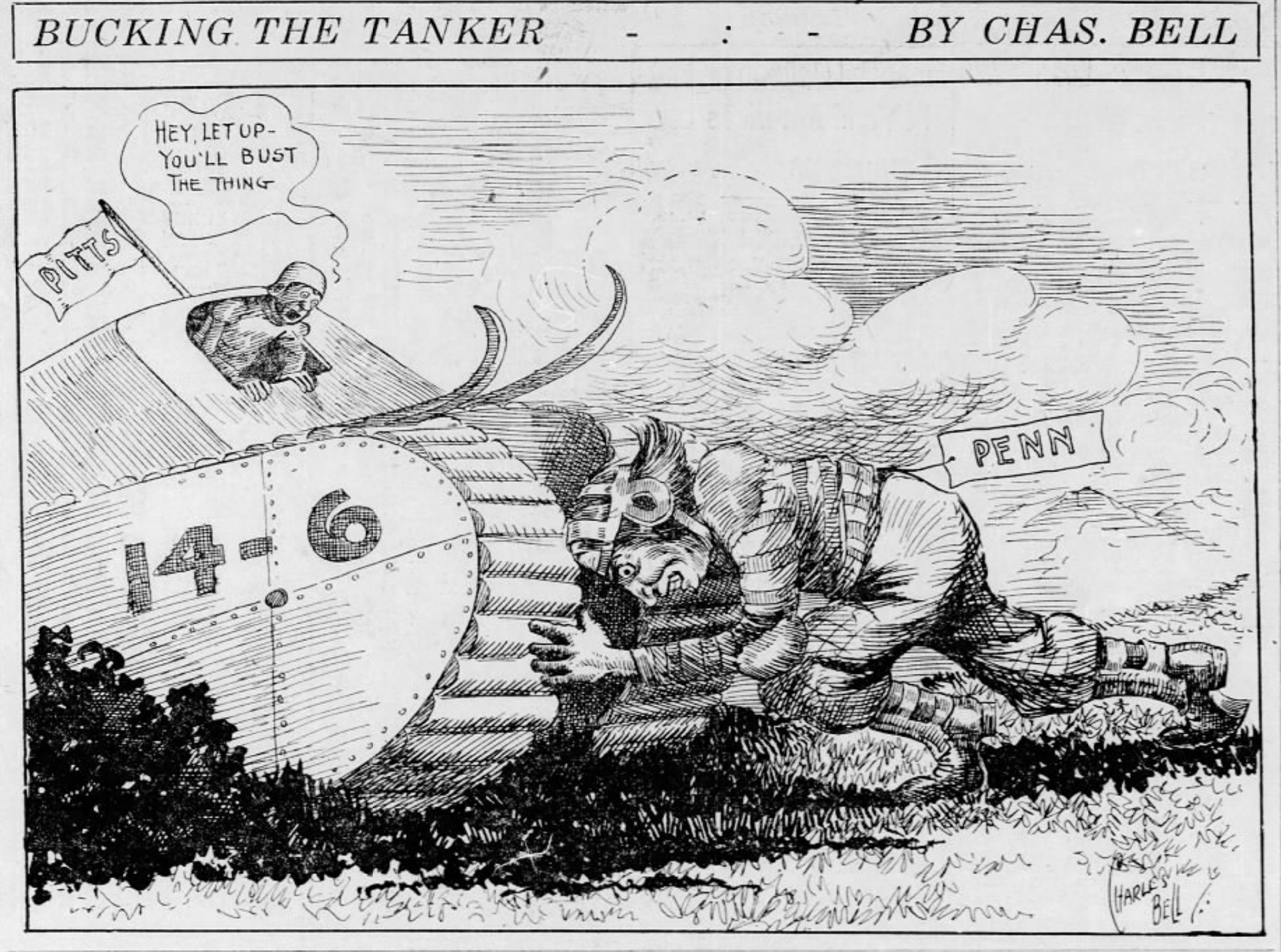
Cartoonist's version of the 1917 Penn vs. Pitt game

The second road game of the season was to Philadelphia's Franklin Field for the third encounter in the series with the Penn Quakers. The 1917 Penn team, led by second year coach Bob Folwell, boasted five All-Americans: end-Heinie Miller; tackle-Joseph Strauss; guard-Herbert Dieter; center-Lud Wray and fullback-Joseph Berry. The Quakers came into this game with a 3–1 record. Their only loss was to Georgia Tech by a score of 41–0. Penn finished the season with a 9–2 record.

On Friday, October 26, "The Pitt squad, managers, scribes, camp-followers and rooters will leave on the 1 o'clock train from Union Station, and the Pitt band of 60 pieces, which is able to go through a fund raised on the Pitt campus will be along. Chief Cheerleader Harry Shirk, his assistants and the coeds are to be given credit for the drive that enables Pitt to go to the conquest as an army with banners-and music. If the Pitt band doesn't strike terror in the hearts of the Easterners, they're scare proof. Through the courtesy of the Pittsburgh team, 500 tickets have been given to the war emergency unit to be distributed to enlisted men. Previously all enlisted men in uniform were admitted free to the games. Tickets must now be secured."

Pitt was healthy but "(Leonard) Hilty, the big tackle, was ordered to report at Cape May to the Naval Reserve, in which he enlisted some time ago." Vance Allshouse replaced him in the lineup.

Coach Warner was worried: "Two weeks ago it looked as if we would beat Penn by a big score, but now I am not so sure about it. If Penn has a strong team we are likely to lose. At any rate we will be lucky if we win and it will be by a mighty close score."

The Pittsburgh Sunday Post reported: "History repeated itself on historic Franklin Field this afternoon. Two autumns ago the Panthers invaded Philadelphia and came to hand-grips with a fighting “Old Penn” eleven, and retired victorious by two touchdowns to one, to their side of the mountains. The same thing happened today. Two touchdowns to one – 14 to 6 in this case – was the Pitt victory margin, earned in a hot and grueling battle on a dusty field, before 18,000 folks, with the temperature too high for comfort to either spectators or players. And Pitt is satisfied – almost. Penn, too, is satisfied. Everybody is satisfied with the result except the Pitt rooters, who wagered money that Pitt would win by two touchdowns or more. Penn counts it a moral victory to hold Pitt to this score. The best team won. There is no doubt of that."

The 1919 Pitt Owl Yearbook recapped the action: "The annual game with the University of Pennsylvania was played at Franklin Field and proved to be one of the real surprises of the season. Pitt won 14–6 after one of the most grueling battles in football history. Entering the game with apparently no chance to stop the fast going Panthers, Penn showed its traditional fight and Capt. Carlson's team had a hard time winning. McLaren's terrific line plunging enabled Pitt to get within scoring distance just after the second half started and a forward pass, McCarter to Carlson, brought the first tally. Shortly after that Harrington grabbed a blocked kick on the 1-yard line and McLaren took it over. Penn's score came late in the game and was due to poor judgement on Pitt's part. A forward pass was tried far down in Pitt territory and Penn got the ball and ran it to the 7 yard line. Several plunges took it over. One of the largest crowds that ever filed in Franklin Field was present. The game was hard but cleanly fought and Pitt's team was praised by critics and opponents for sportsmanlike conduct. All this helped cement athletic relations between the two big Keystone State universities."

The Pittsburgh Post revealed the statistics: "Pitt had the upper hand in almost every department of the game, the sole exception being in total ground gained by forward pass. Penn's eight completed attempts netted the Red and Blue 78 yards. Pitt's five perfect ones netted 77." Each team had three interceptions. "Pitt's total yardage from scrimmage was 324; Penn's 225. Penn got 147 yards from rushing the ball and Pitt 247, showing that Pitt's ground attack was immensely superior. Pitt made 18 first downs, four on forward passes, to 10 first downs for Penn, 3 on forwards. Pitt lost 50 yards in distance penalties and Penn lost 5 yards, quite an item to make up."

The Pitt lineup for the game against Penn was Cliff Carlson (left end), Vance Allshouse (left tackle), John Sutherland (left guard), Edward Stahl (center), Dale Sies (right guard), Fred Seidel (right tackle), Ray Allshouse (right end), William Miller (quarterback), Harry McCarter (left halfback), Roy Easterday (right halfback), and George McLaren (fullback). Substitutes appearing in the game for Pitt were William McClelland, David Pitler, I. R. Pearlman, Carl Miksch, William Harrington and Roscoe Gougler. The game was played in 15-minute quarters.

=== Westminster ===
Week 6: Westminster at Pitt

Team	1	2	3	4	Total
Westminster	0	0	0	0	0
• Pitt	12	13	0	0	25

- Date: November 3, 1917
- Location: Forbes Field
  Pittsburgh, PA
- Game start: 3:05 p.m.
- Referee: Dexter Very (Penn State)

The Westminster Titans led by first year coach Hugh Lawrie was the opponent on the Saturday between the Penn and Wash-Jeff games. The Titans owned a 1–3 record, having beaten Thiel College 7 to 0 the previous Saturday. Westminster would finish the season 2–7.

Ralph S. Davis of The Pittsburg Press set the tone: "In the local football realm today brings a sort of lull before the big storm of the season. The Pitt Panthers, after their decisive victory over Old Penn a week ago, tackle the Westminster College eleven as a stepping stone to the Western Pennsylvania championship classic next Saturday with Washington and Jefferson. Warner does not want his men to take any unusual risks or unnecessary chances with the W. & J. game looming up in the near future. He is very eager to preserve his lineup intact for the battle with the Red and Black next Saturday, and it was figured that he might give a few of his regulars a rest today."

The 1919 Owl Yearbook concurred: "Westminster occupied the "fill in" date between the Penn and W. & J. games, November 3, and Coach Warner used a substitute line-up most of the time against them. The score was 25–0, the New Wilmington team giving a plucky exhibition in the second half and holding Pitt scoreless."

Sunday, The Pittsburg Press noted: "Pitt had no trouble whatever yesterday at Forbes Field in walloping Westminster to the tune of 25 to 0. The score could just as easily been three times as large had "Pop" Warner decided to make it so. But it was rumored around that the entire W. & J. team were on hand to get a line on the Panther team, and to make the game interesting Warner held his first line men on the bench and sent in the reserves to get a good workout."

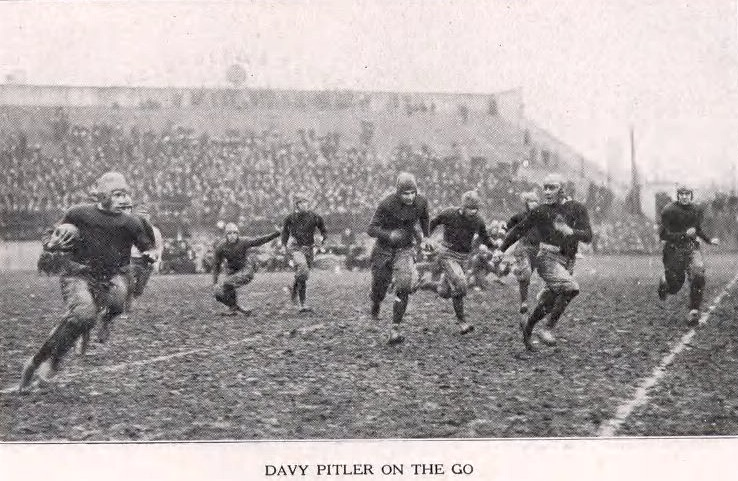
1917 Pitt halfback Dave Pitler returning punt vs. Westminster

All scoring took place in the first half. On Pitt's first possession, they advanced the ball to the Westminster 17-yard line. Quarterback William Miller "tore through the Westminster line 16 yards for touchdown after (Harry) McCarter had gained a yard at center. (Cliff) Carlson missed goal." Pitt led 6 to 0. Pitt regained possession on the Westminster 45-yard line. "Miller gained two yards on a pass from (David) Pitler and on the next play, a pass from McCarter, (George) McLaren made a long run around left end and was not downed until he had registered a touchdown. Carlson again failed at goal." Pitt led 12 to 0 at the end of the first quarter.

Early in the second quarter Westminster gained a first down on forward passes. The Pitt defense held and Westminster quarterback "Weirman kicked to Pitler on the 40-yard line. He made the catch and then outran the Westminster men, running 60 yards for touchdown. Carlson missed goal for the third time." Pitt regained possession at midfield and rushed the ball to the ten yard line. On first down "Miller went around right end for the touchdown. McLaren kicked the goal." Final score; Pitt 25 – Westminster 0.

The Pitt lineup for the game against Westminster was H. Clifford Carlson (left end), Vance Allshouse (left tackle), W. J. Thomas (left guard), Thomas Kendrick (center), Leland Stanford (right guard), I. R. Pearlman (right tackle), Ray Allshouse (right end), William Miller (quarterback), David Pitler (left halfback), Harry McCarter (right halfback), and George McLaren (fullback). Substitutes appearing in the game for Pitt were Fred Henry, William Baurys, John Sutherland, Edward Stahl, Dale Sies, William McClelland, Roscoe Gougler, B. Peters, Carl Miksch, James McIntyre and Robert Penman. The game was played in 12-minute quarters.

=== Washington & Jefferson ===
Week 7: Washington & Jefferson at Pitt

Team	1	2	3	4	Total
W. & J.	3	0	7	0	10
• Pitt	7	6	0	0	13

- Date: November 10, 1917
- Location: Forbes Field
  Pittsburgh, PA
- Game start: 2:30 p.m.
- Game attendance: 25,000
- Referee: Robert W. Maxwell (Swarthmore)

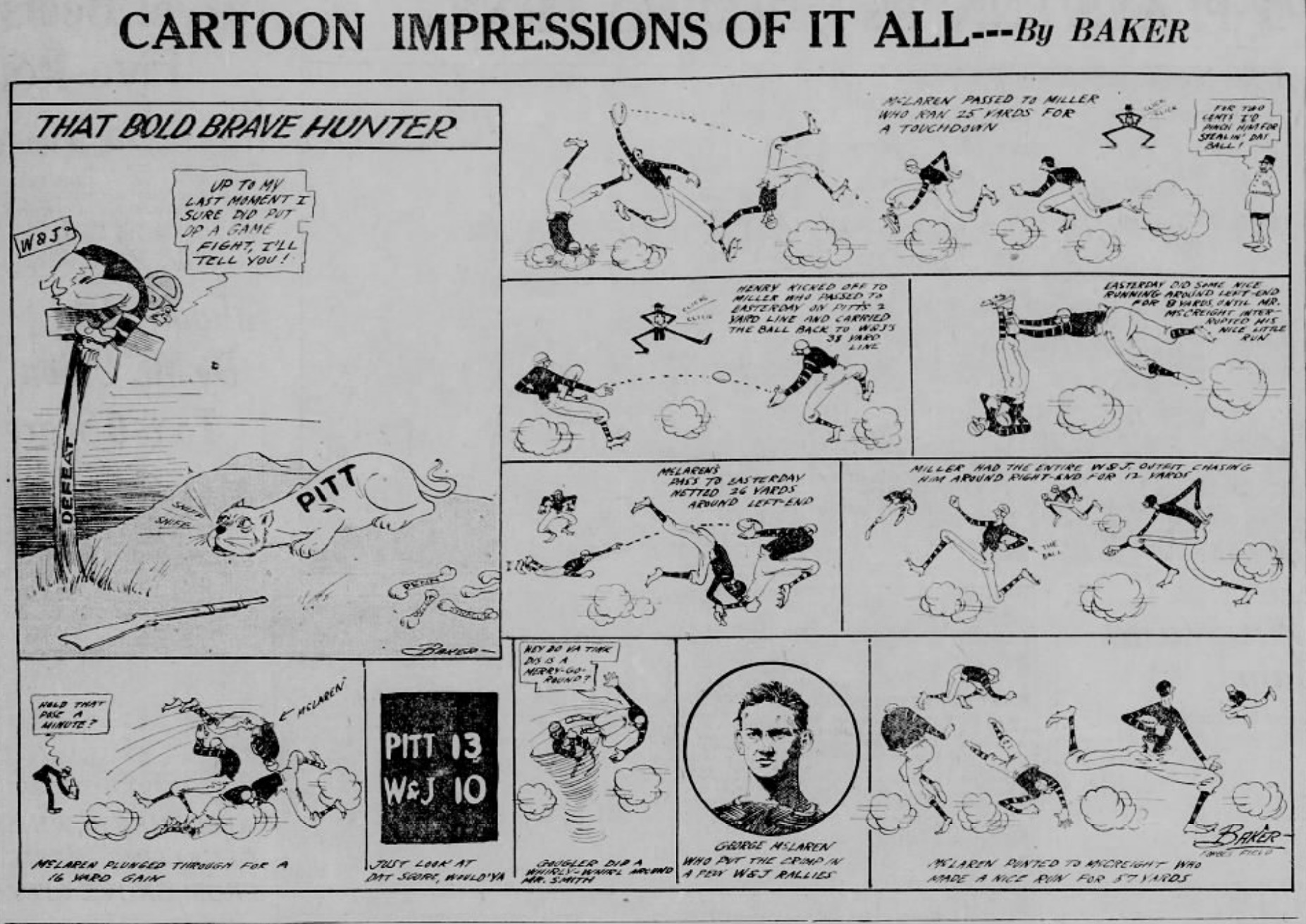
Cartoonist's play-by-play of 1917 Pitt vs. W. & J. game

The undefeated Red and Black of Washington & Jefferson College, led by second-year coach Sol Metzger, were the next foe on the schedule. The 1917 Red and Black eleven had four All-Americans on the roster: ends – Fred Heyman and Elmer "Bird" Carroll; halfback – L. William “Scrubby” McCreight and tackle – Pete Henry. They had a 5—0 record with the 7 to 0 victory over Penn State their only notable win. "The W. & J. team will probably be the heaviest college team in America. The line will average 191, the backfield 172 and the team as a whole 185. In addition, the men seem to be in splendid physical comdition. Red and Black supporters assert that the fans will see the best Wash. - Jeff. Eleven at Forbes Field that has represented the institution in a decade."

Coach Metzger, while scouting the Penn versus Pitt game, told The Pittsburg Press "he was sorry Pitt slumped against Penn. I had hoped that the slump would come on Nov. 10, when we play Pitt," he said, "but now it is all off. Warner will have his men in great shape for the W. & J. battle, and we will have to play harder to win. Do we expect to win? I should say we do. There will be a big surprise on Forbes Field two weeks hence."

Robert W. Maxwell set the tone: "The most important football game in the east this fall will be played in Pittsburgh Saturday (Nov. 10) when the undefeated University of Pittsburgh eleven meets W. & J. at Forbes Field. The teams have gone through the season without meeting defeat, and as they are considered the best in the country, the championship, if one wishes to claim it, hinges on the verdict. With Yale, Harvard, and Princeton out of it and the apparent weakness of other eastern elevens, the real football teams seem to be located in the western part of Pennsylvania. The dope is all wrong this year from an eastern viewpoint, and the outstanding elevens are Pitt and W. & J. They are the class of the country and must be recognized."

On game day Coach Warner opined "It will be a tough game, and I am not making predictions. However, I know that my men will do their best, and the public by this time should have some idea of how good that is." Coach Metzger concurred "In a game of this sort, predictions are ill-timed. My men are in good condition, and will give the Panthers a battle such as they have not had this season. My team is much stronger than that of 1916."

Richard Guy of The Pittsburgh Gazette Times reported: "The sturdy football warriors of the University of Pittsburgh defeated their time-honored and worthy rivals from Washington and Jefferson College in their annual match yesterday afternoon at Forbes Field, 13 to 10, before a crowd of 25,000 partisan adherents of both teams. Pitt was exulted over its well-earned victory and W. and J. over the splendid defensive fight its men waged. The Pitt Panther continues to rule this great Commonwealth of Pennsylvania in college football..."

The 1919 Owl recap noted: "W. & J. got the jump at the start when a fumble gave them the ball near the Pitt goal line and (L. William) McCreight kicked a field goal. Before the quarter ended, the ball was rushed into W. & J.. territory and "Foxy' Miller got away for a 20 yard run and touchdown." Roscoe Gougler kicked goal and Pitt led 7–3 after one quarter. “When McCreight kicked his field goal in the first quarter, it was the first time in two seasons that an opponent had started scoring before Pitt.”

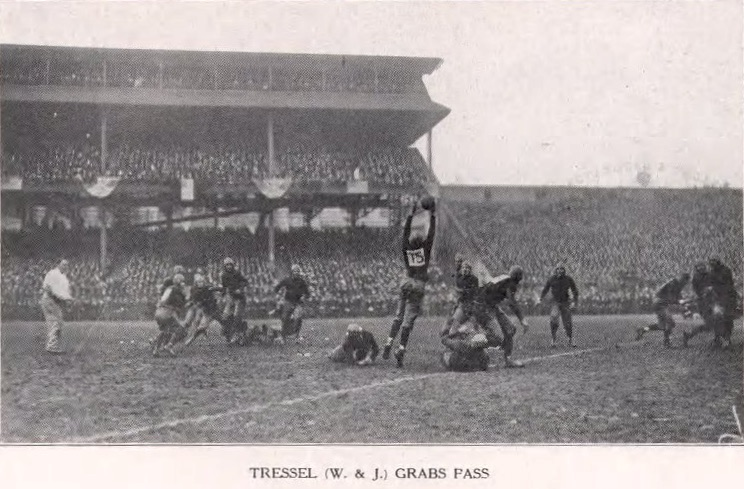
Tressel (W. & J.) catching a pass vs. Pitt in 1917 game

After an exchange of punts Pitt had possession on the W. & J. 19-yard line to start the second period. "(Roy) Easterday gained six yards around left end. Gougler rounded the other flank for four yards and a first down on the nine. Easterday carried the ball for three yards on a smash at center. George McLaren then ran off tackle for five yards, bringing play to the one yard line. It needed only one more try, this time through the middle of the line, for McLaren to lug the pigskin over the line for Pitt's second touchdown. There was no punt-out and Gougler missed the goal from a slight angle. Halftime score: Pitt 13, Wash-Jeff 3."

"The second half was decidedly W. & J. for a while. McCreight ran back a punt 35 yards and short passes and runs gave them a touchdown. Pitt 13 to W. & J. 10. Pitt braced in the fourth quarter and should have scored another touchdown but for a little bad judgement in selecting plays." "An exchange of punts got the ball for Pitt in midfield. McLaren threw a pass to McCarter, who ran 25 yards, being downed on the Washington and Jefferson 20-yard line. Eight successive times McLaren had the ball for line assaults and he responded with gains except the final one." W. & J. took over on the one yard line and a few minutes later the game ended.

Pitt gained 280 yards to 56 yards for W. & J. The Panthers had 13 first downs to 2 for the Red and Black. But the Washington & Jefferson gained 105 yards returning punts, which contributed to keeping the score close. W. & J. finished the season with a 7–3 record.

Coach Warner to The Pittsburgh Sunday Post: "Wash-Jeff played a fine game throughout. I am glad we won, but think we should have made it a little more decisive. However, I have no inclination to take any credit away from Metzger's men by claiming that our team did not play up to form. Lapses in generalship proved costly to us."

"Scrubby" McCreight, W. & J. captain added: "We were beaten in a hard game. We gave the best we had and outplayed Pitt as often as Pitt outplayed us. It was one of those games that are good to win and hard to lose."

"Incidentally, the touchdown made by Wash-Jeff yesterday was the first the Red and Black had pushed over a Pitt goal line since 1914, when it won by the same score that Pitt triumphed yesterday."

The Pitt lineup for the game against Wash-Jeff was H. Clifford Carlson (left end), I. R. Pearlman (left tackle), John Sutherland (left guard), Edward Stahl (center), Dale Sies (right guard), Fred Seidel (right tackle), William Harrington (left end), William Miller (quarterback), Roscoe Gougler (left halfback), Roy Easterday (right halfback), and George McLaren (fullback). Substitutes appearing in the game for Pitt were Fred Henry, Vance Allshouse, Ray Allshouse, William McClelland, David Pitler and Harry McCarter. The game was played in 15-minute quarters.

=== Carnegie Tech ===
Week 8: Carnegie Tech at Pitt

Team	1	2	3	4	Total
Carnegie Tech	0	0	0	0	0
• Pitt	7	7	6	7	27

- Date: November 17, 1917
- Location: Forbes Field
  Pittsburgh, PA
- Game start: 2:30 p.m.
- Referee: S. A. McFarland (Wash-Jeff)

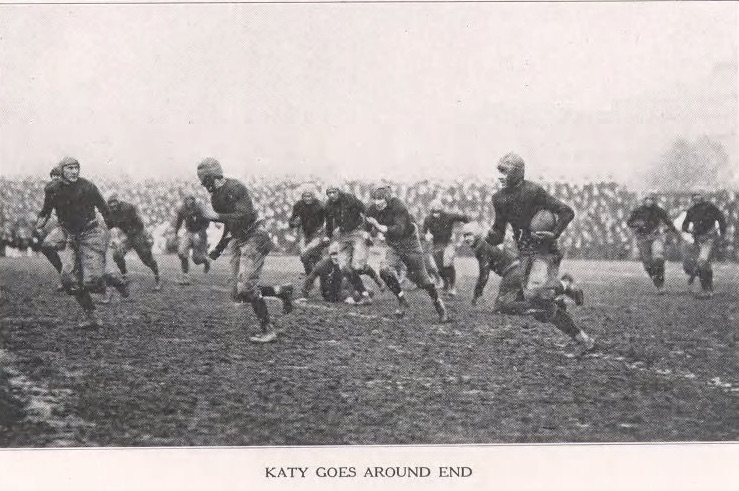
Pitt's Katy Easterday carrying the ball against Carnegie Tech in 1917 match

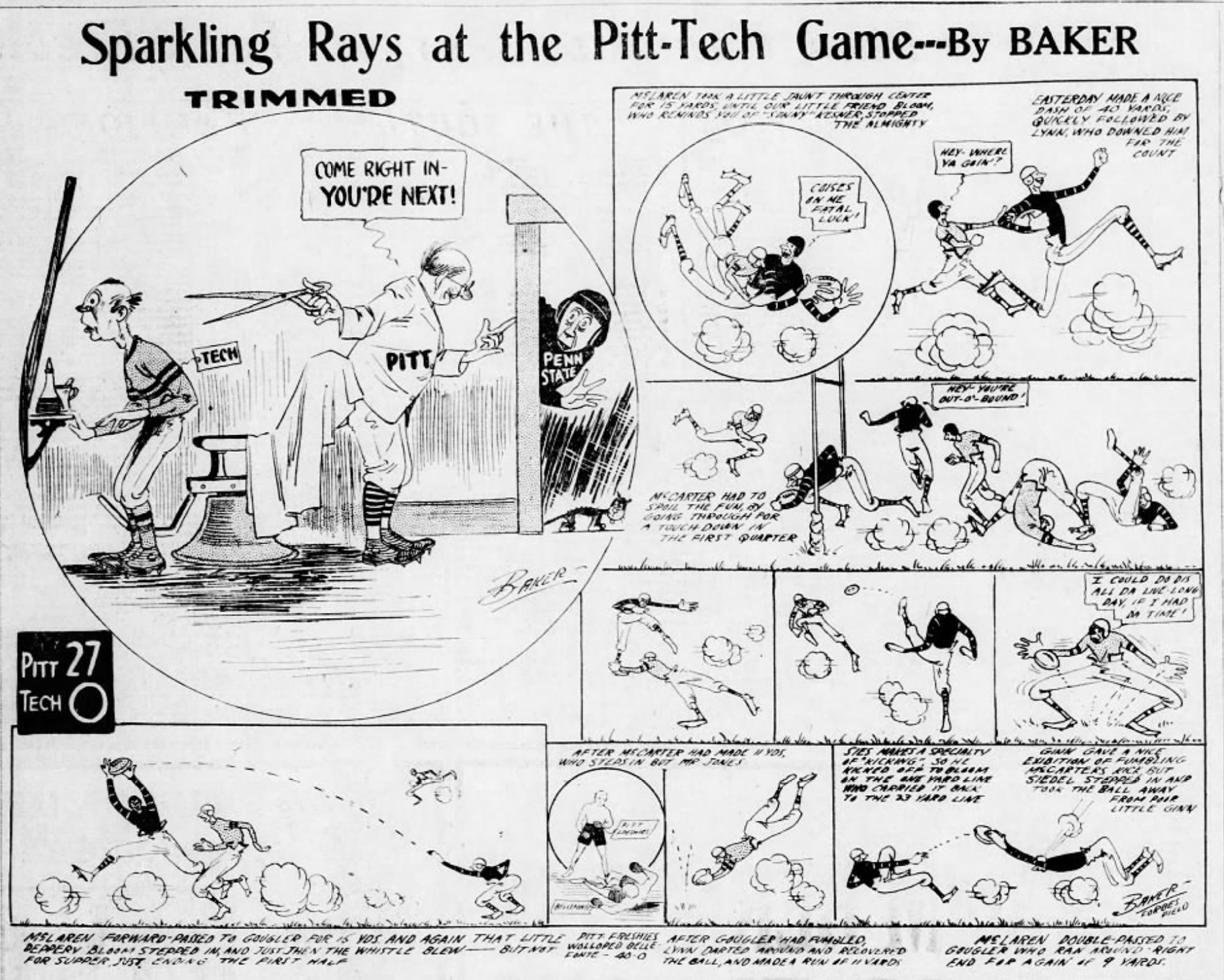
Cartoonist's depiction of the 1917 Pitt versus Carnegie Tech game

The 1917 Carnegie Tech squad led by fourth year coach Walter Steffen came into the Pitt game with a 2–2–1 record, having lost to Army and Cornell. Coach Steffen had only one returning starter from the 1916 squad that gave Pitt a scare by holding the Panthers to a 14–6 final. Harry Keck of The Pittsburgh Post reported: "The very strongest lineup that it will be possible for Tech to present will take the field this afternoon. All the men who have been regulars most of the season will be in their places and last night every one of them was reported in the best of physical condition."

Earlier in the week The Pittsburgh Post noted: "The last two games worked havoc in the Pitt ranks. Injury to four of the first-string men places the Panther mentor in a very embarrassing position as regards the rest of the games of the year. Easterday is still far below par with a twisted shoulder he acquired in the battle against Penn. Miller, it will be remembered, had his old bad leg broken two years ago against the Indians, and Saturday the same leg got another injury that may result in his permanent loss to the squad. McClelland, the other strong varsity quarter, is likewise in bad condition, due to the fracture of one of the bones in his foot."

Ralph Davis of The Pittsburg Press updated the Panther lineup: "Pitt lines up today with a weakened team. Capt. Carlson is out of it, and several of the backfield men are in bad shape, so that they may not last through the battle. It was planned to start Harrington and Ray Allshouse at the ends, though it was figured that Henry, the little 135-pound lad, would get a chance at one of the extremities before the battle was very old."

Richard Guy of The Gazette Times summed up the game thusly: "The University of Pittsburgh was four touchdowns better than Carnegie Institute of Technology in their annual football match yesterday afternoon at Forbes Field. The Panther won 27 to 0, Skip Gougler missing one try at goal, following a touchdown, the third one which came in the third period. Students, alumni and the general public composed the throng which enjoyed the spirited play of the contestants and the exuberant spirit of the cheering factions. But there was such a disparity in physical prowess in favor of the Panther that the Skibo men were outplayed from the start but not broken in spirit."

In the first period, the Pitt offense advanced the ball to the 4-yard line, "where McCarter went around left end for a touchdown. Gougler kicked the goal. Score, Pitt 7, Tech 0." The second period score came after an intercepted pass by McClelland on the Pitt 34-yard line. The Pitt offensive machine methodically worked the ball to Tech's 2-yard line and "McLaren failed by inches to carry it over but on the next try Gougler carried through the line for a touchdown and immediately kicked goal. Score, Pitt 14, Tech 0." Late in the third quarter Pitt gained possession on their own 40-yard line. Seven plays later Pitt was on Tech's 3-yard line, "McLaren going over for a touchdown on the next play. Gougler failed at goal. Score, Pitt 20, Tech 0." Early in the final quarter Pitt gained possession on their 45-yard line and in three plays it was first down on the Tech 45-yard line. "On the very next play Easterday rounded left end for a 40 yard run being stopped on the Tech 5-yard line. Mclaren made a yard at right tackle and Easterday on the next play went over the line for the touchdown. Gougler kicked the goal. Score, Pitt 27, Tech 0."

"Red Carlson, the Pitt captain, who has been in every game Pitt has played the past four years up to yesterday, or since he entered the university from Bellefonte Academy, played a short while yesterday just to keep his record intact. The Pitt students cheered him."

The Pitt lineup for the game against Carnegie Tech was William Harrington (left end), I. R. Pearlman (left tackle), John Sutherland (left guard). Edward Stahl (center), Dale Sies (right guard), Fred Seidel (right tackle), Ray Allshouse (right end), William McClelland (quarterback), Roscoe Goughler (left halfback), Harry McCarter (right halfback), and George McLaren (fullback). Substitutes appearing in the game for Pitt were Fred Henry, H. Clifford Carlson, Leland Stanford and Roy Easterday. The game was played in 15-minute quarters.

=== Penn State ===
Week 9: Penn State at Pitt

Team	1	2	3	4	Total
Penn State	0	6	0	0	6
• Pitt	14	0	0	14	28

- Date: November 29, 1917
- Location: Forbes Field
  Pittsburgh, PA
- Game start: 2:30 p.m.
- Game attendance: 20,000
- Referee: J. A. Evans (Williams)

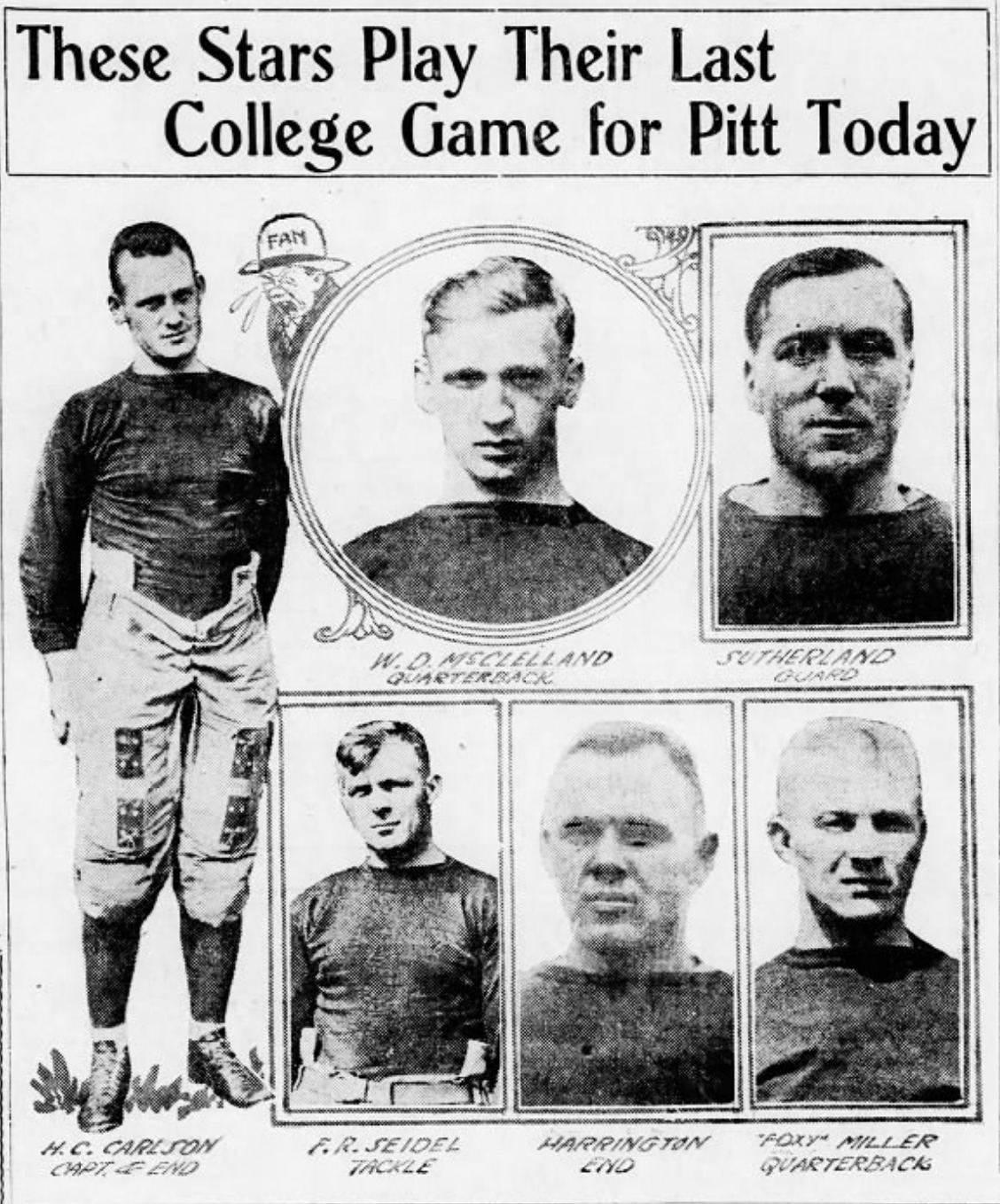
1917 Pitt football team seniors

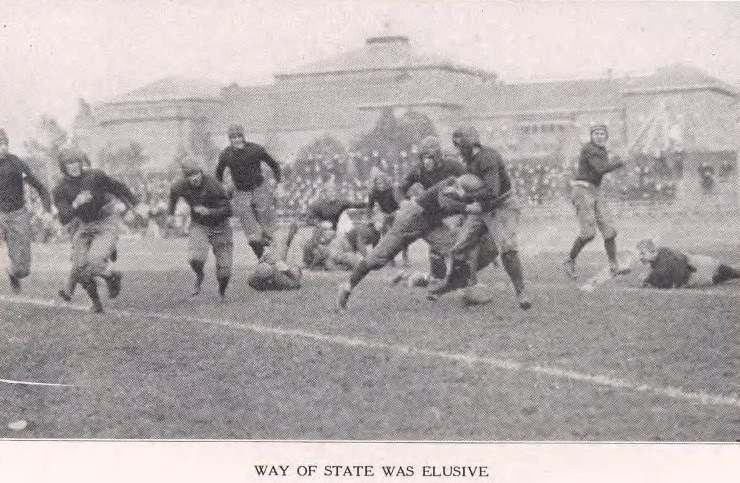
State quarterback Charley Way gaining yards in 1917 game

On November 29, third year coach Dick Harlow brought his 5—3 Penn State Lions to Forbes Field for the annual Thanksgiving Day scuffle with the Pitt Panthers. The Lions had lost to Lehigh, Wash-Jeff, and Dartmouth. Penn State lost 16 of their top 18 players to the war effort. "The state team today is made up of substitutes and last year's freshmen players. And a very worthy eleven it is, well coached, fast, and resourceful. But lacking the seasoning and strength that a squad must have if it is going to take the scalp of the Panthers, even though the Panthers, too, have given of their stars to the greater game 'over the water'."

Coach Warner spoke to The Pittsburgh Post: "We should beat State this afternoon, but I don't look for an easy game. My problem this year has been to bring about the proper mental attitude on the part of the team. Any team that hasn't been beaten for three years gets lethargic at times. I believe the boys all realize they have a battle on their hands today, however, and will fight as they did against W. & J. Captain Carlson's absence from the game is regrettable, but I figure that young Allshouse will look after that position all right. Our people who have seen State play say they are dangerous."

R. H. Smith, Graduate Manager, Penn State College countered: "The State team is going into the game determined to fight to the last ditch. That is the way all State teams do. The 'dope' may be against us, but that doesn't mean we are sure losers. We aren't going in there with the idea of keeping down the score. We are going in TO WIN. Pitt will know before the game is over that she is up against a real football team."

The 1919 Owl recap was succinct: "For the fifth successive time the Varsity vanquished Penn State in the Annual Thanksgiving Day contest at Forbes Field. The score of 28—6 about shows the strength of the two teams."

Richard Guy of The Pittsburgh Gazette Times gave credit to the Penn State Lions: "The Pitt Panther still reigns supreme in Eastern collegiate football, for yesterday at Forbes Field in the presence of 20,000 spectators, it defeated a well-prepared team which Coach Dick Harlow brought here from Penn State, by the score of 28 to 6. The Panther did not expect such a fight as the Blue and White warriors gave them yesterday."

The Philadelphia Inquirer agreed: "Pennsylvania State College was defeated this afternoon by the University of Pittsburgh in their annual football contest at Forbes Field, 28 to 6. The game was far more closely contested and hard fought than the score would indicate. Using a spread formation, the Penn State backfield men worked a variety of plays that kept the Pitt men on the defense all through the second and third periods."

Pitt received the opening kickoff and advanced the ball from their 22-yard line to the 7-yard line of Penn State in less than four minutes. "McLaren plunged and got two yards through right guard. McCarter carried the ball on the next play and after apparently being stopped, lugged the pigskin over for a touchdown. Sies kicked goal from the 16-yard line. Score: Pitt 7, Penn State 0." Later in the quarter, the Pitt offense started another sustained drive from their 22-yard line. Four first downs brought the ball to the Penn State 34-yard line. "McLaren hit right tackle for two. On the next play, Easterday took a double pass from McLaren and forward-passed to Gougler, who made the catch on the 10-yard line and ran to the three before he was tackled. From this point his own momentum carried him over the goal line on the slippery sod. It was more like a slide into second base than the scoring of a touchdown."

Penn State gained possession on its 35-yard line early in the second quarter. "Harry Robb, ...turned a flank and ran to the Pitt 32-yard line. There followed a jab or so at the line and a triple pass, Gross to Robb to Conover, resulted in the ball lodging on the Pitt 20-yard line. There ensued another shift formation. Then a direct pass went to Gross, who double-passed to Robb. Standing still and with Pitt men flocking about him, Robb very coolly projected the ball over the heads of his enemy to Conover on the five-yard line. There was nobody near the end, and Conover stepped out the remaining five yards without any trouble. Conover failed at goal." The Pitt offense then advanced the ball to the Penn State 7-yard line but lost the ball "when a pass was grounded behind the goal line." Halftime score: Pitt 14 to Penn State 6.

"The third quarter saw State using the same tactics, but Pitt gradually spoiling the effectiveness of the open play. In the final quarter Pitt got started again and tallied two more touchdowns, completely smothering the State offense and defense. Statistics show that Pitt gained 495 yards to State's 156 and that 20 first downs were made to 9 for State." Final score: Pitt 28 to Penn State 6.

The Pitt lineup for the game against Penn State was William Harrington (left end), I. R. Pearlman (left tackle), John Sutherland (left guard), Edward Stahl (center), Dale Sies (right guard), Fred Seidel (right tackle), Ray Allshouse (right end), William McClelland (quarterback), Harry McCarter (left halfback), Roy Easterday (right halfback) and George McLaren (fullback). Substitutes appearing in the game for Pitt were Fred Henry, H. Clifford Carlson, Roscoe Gougler, Clyde Mitchell, William Miller, and Vance Allshouse. The game was played in 15-minute quarters.

=== Camp Lee ===
Week 10: Camp Lee at Pitt

Team	1	2	3	4	Total
Camp Lee	0	0	0	0	0
• Pitt	6	12	6	6	30

- Date: December 1, 1917
- Location: Forbes Field
  Pittsburgh, PA
- Game start: 2:30 p.m.
- Game attendance: 4,000
- Referee: S. A. McFarland (Wash - Jeff)

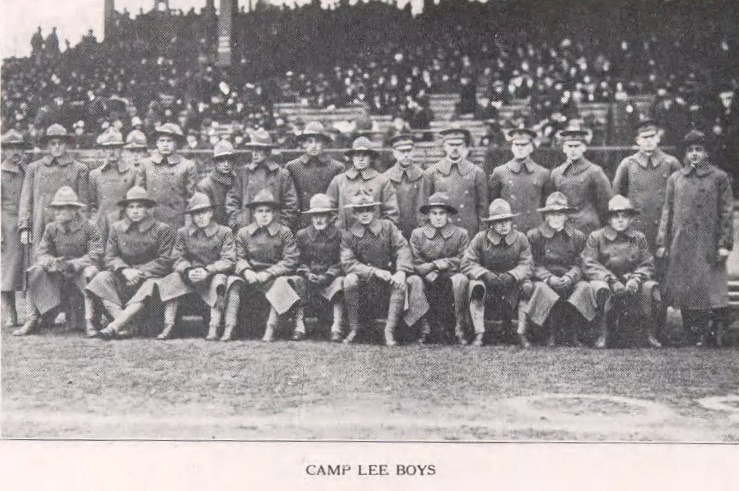
1917 Camp Lee football team

"The 1917 football season passes into history today, and as an attractive get-away event the patrons of the great college sport in Western Pennsylvania can avail themselves of a game out of the ordinary at Forbes Field. The All-Star team from the Three Hundred and Twentieth Regiment, Camp Lee will play the Pitt Panther, starting at 2:30 o'clock." "The student senate met and unanimously agreed that all students would buy a special ticket for the game rather than ask for admission on their regular student athletic books. The Pitt boys will also act as ushers, ticket takers, sellers and directors without charge. The entire organization of the University has been turned over to boost the game without a cent of expense to the soldier boys."

"The Soldiers are here under the direction of Lieut. Miller of Company B. He is a former Yale center. He had his men at practice yesterday morning at Forbes Field, and all hands confidently expect to give the Panther a merry chase this afternoon."

The Philadelphia Inquirer reported: "The University of Pittsburgh second string men easily defeated a team of ex-college stars, representing the 320th Infantry of Camp Lee at Forbes Field this afternoon 30 to 0. Pop Warner used only one man who started against Penn State on Thursday, (William) Harrington, who acted as captain of the team. (William) Miller, who alternated with (William) McClelland at quarterback during the season, was the only other regular in the game, and he directed the team play. Pitt scored five touchdowns and missed the try for goal after each of the scores."

"(Robert) Penman, at fullback, was the star for Pitt, he scoring three touchdowns. (B.) Peters and (David) Pitler each scored one touchdown, this being the extent of Pitt's scoring. It must be said, however, that the soldier boys never gave up, and though doomed to defeat from the beginning they were as full of fight at the end as when the whistle first blew."

"The attendance, however, was small, for the turnstiles registered the presence of exactly 3,433 persons. According to the official figured furnished by Graduate Manager Karl E. Davis last evening the receipts amounted to $4,752." After subtracting expenses, including a war tax on tickets, "those in charge of the soldier's fund last night received a check for $4,341, to be added to the sum which is being raised for the army camp."

The Pitt lineup for the game against Camp Lee was Fred Henry (left end), Vance Allshouse (left tackle), W. J. Thomas (left guard), Thomas Kendrick and James McIntyre (center), Leland Stanford (right guard), Clyde Mitchell (right tackle), William Harrington (right end), William Miller (quarterback), David Pitler (left halfback), B. Peters and Carl Miksch (right halfback), and Robert Penman (fullback). The game was played in 12-minute quarters.

== Scoring summary ==
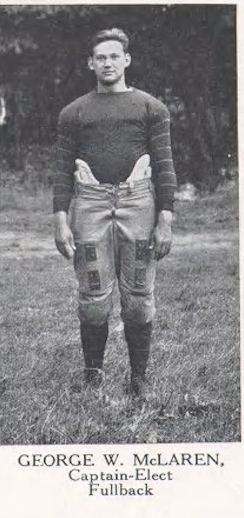
George McLaren

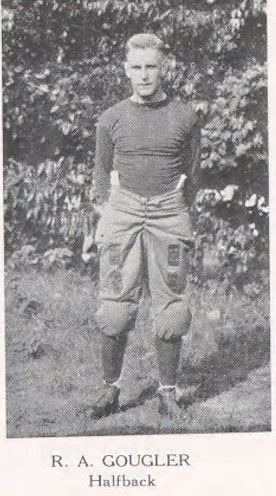
Roscoe Gougler

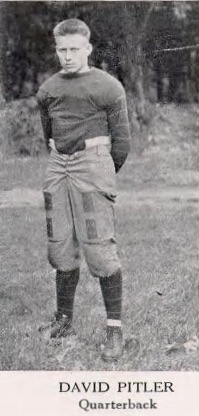
David Pitler

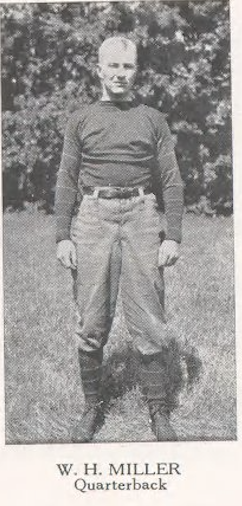
William Miller

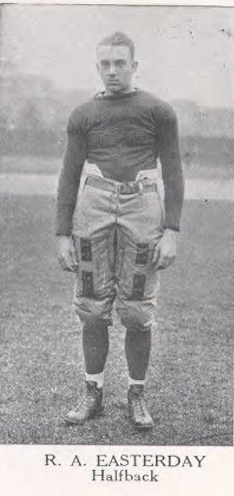
Roy Easterday

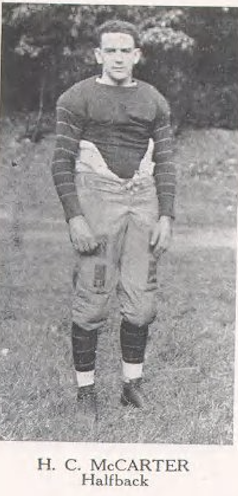
Harry McCarter

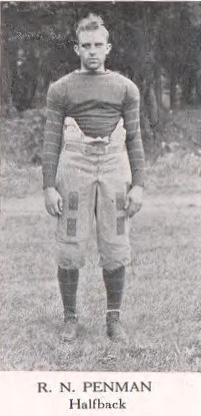
Robert Penman

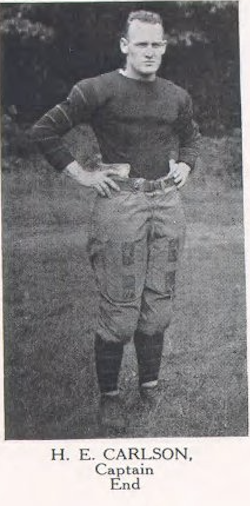
Captain Clifford Carlson

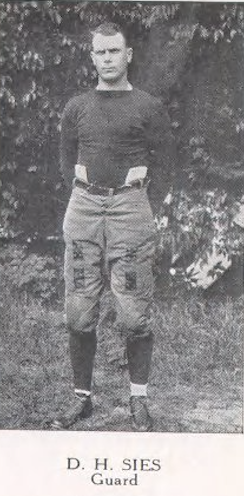
Dale Sies

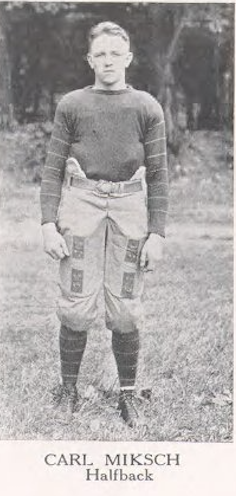
Carl Miksch

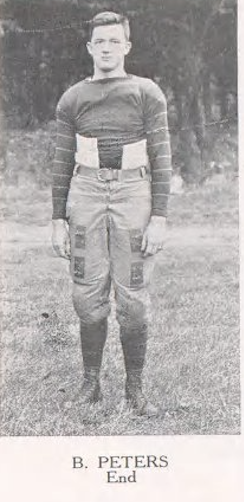
Bernard Peters

1917 Pittsburgh Panthers scoring summary
Player	Touchdowns	Extra points	Field goals	Safety	Points
George McClaren	13	1	0	0	79
Roscoe Gougler	4	14	0	0	38
David Pitler	4	0	0	0	24
William Miller	4	0	0	0	24
Roy Easterday	3	0	0	0	18
Harry McCarter	3	0	0	0	18
Robert Penman	3	0	0	0	18
H. Clifford Carlson	2	3	0	0	15
Dale Sies	1	8	0	0	14
Carl Miksch	1	0	0	0	6
Bernard Peters	1	0	0	0	6
Totals	39	26	0	0	260

== Postseason ==
"The season was an unqualified success, not a game was lost, and critics awarded the Eastern college championship to the team led by 'Red' Carlson. It was possibly not made up of as many star individual players as in previous years, but it had the 'punch' and the 'fight'. These two characteristics brought the Blue and Gold through victorious on several occasions when things looked shaky. Capt. Carlson proved to be an excellent leader and had the men with him all the time. The student support was splendid, with the newly uniformed band always in evidence."

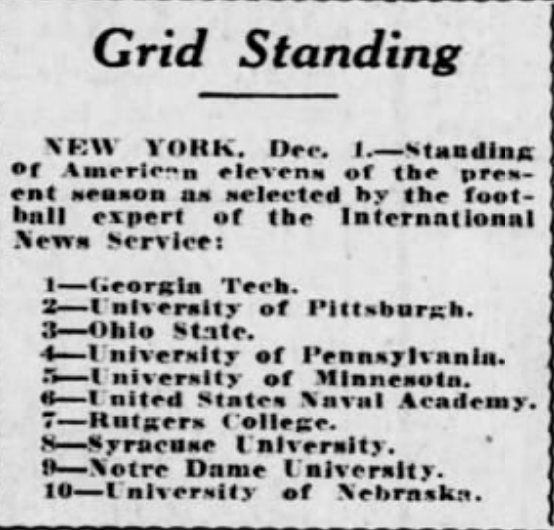
1917 top ten football rankings

The football expert of the International news service selected Pitt as the number two team in the nation behind Georgia Tech.

"George McLaren, the sturdy fullback, was unanimously chosen captain of the University of Pittsburgh football team for next year at an informal dinner given the squad at the Schenley last evening. The men given letters were Carlson, McLaren, Stahl, Seidel, Easterday, R. Allshouse, V. Allshouse, Sies, Gougler, Miller, McClelland, Harrington, Henry, McCarter, Pearlman, Hilty and Sutherland."

Coach Warner summed up the season for The Pittsburg Press:

"The successful outcome of the University of Pittsburgh's 1917 football season was the result of co-operation, team work and harmony upon the team, the management and coaching staff. There has been no friction, no jealousy and, so far as I know, no knocking by anyone connected with athletics in the university, and the sporting writers and the newspapers have been boosters all through the season. As head coach, I desire to thank the players, the managers, my able assistants on the field, the athletic committee and the newspapers for the help they have given me and the team. Such co-operation, harmony and team work upon the part of all interested in the success of athletics as we have had during the past few years is bound, if continued in the future, to keep the university athletic teams up near the top. That we had a great squad of players last year is proven by the fact that in spite of the loss of a very large proportion of our first and second string players and the best men on the freshman team on account of the war, we still had enough left to form a team that compared very favorably with that of last year."

== All-American Selections ==
- Clifford Carlson, end (1st team Walter Eckersall, of the Chicago Daily Tribune; 1st team, Jack Veiock of the International News Service)
- George "Tank" McLaren, fullback (College Football Hall of Fame inductee) (Frank Menke Syndicate; [HB] 1st team Walter Eckersall, of the Chicago Daily Tribune; 2nd team Paul Purman, noted sportswriter whose All-American team was syndicated in newspapers across the United States; 1st team, Jack Veiock of the International News Service)
- **Dale Sies**, guard (Frank Menke Syndicate; 1st team Paul Purman, noted sportswriter whose All-American team was syndicated in newspapers across the United States; Dick Jemison of the Atlanta Constitution.)
- **Jock Sutherland**, guard (1st team, Jack Veiock of the International News Service)

Bold = Consensus All-American
