= Jack Veiock =

American sportswriter and editor

- Born: February 3, 1888; Rochester, Pennsylvania, US
- Died: June 11, 1922 (aged 34); Ripton, Vermont, US
- Occupations: Sportswriter and editor
- Known for: Sporting editor of the International News Service

Eugene Ruppert "Jack" Veiock (February 3, 1888 – June 11, 1922), sometimes known as "J.R.", was an American sportswriter and editor. He was the sporting editor of the International News Service from 1916 to 1921.

Veiock was born at Rochester, Pennsylvania in 1883. His father, Albert Veiock, was a Pennsylvania native. In 1900, Veiock was living with his parents and two younger sisters in Canton, Ohio. His father was employed as a foreman at a pottery works. He began his career as a journalist in St. Joseph, Missouri. From there, he moved to Indianapolis, Indiana, serving as the sporting editor of the Indiana Daily Times from 1914 to 1915. In January 1916, he was hired as the sporting editor of the International News Service, the wire service for the Hearst Newspapers. He remained as the sporting editor of the INS for six years until he was forced into retirement by illness. He developed pleurisy while covering the 1919 World Series. In July 1920, he traveled to Antwerp, Belgium to cover the 1920 Summer Olympics for the INS. In the fall of 1921, he developed tuberculosis after covering the Army-Navy football game in the rain. He was sent to a sanitarium in Ripton, Vermont, where he died of pneumonia in June 1922.

== Selected articles by Veiock ==
- Jess Willard Is 'Corn Fed': World's Pugilistic Champion Says He Tips Scales at 270 Pounds (Jess Willard), December 7, 1916
- Playing the Field (Jack Barry), August 13, 1917
- Fitzsimmons Was Notable Ring Figure ("Ruby Bob" Fitzsimmons), October 22, 1917
- Sox Are Glad To Go West (1917 World Series), The Pittsburgh Press, October 12, 1917
- Three Teams May Lay Claim To Title (1917 college football season), November 19, 1917
- Much Fame Has Been Denied Howard Berry (Howard Berry), November 21, 1917
- Critics Do Not Give Beckett Much Credit (Joe Beckett), September 3, 1919
- Dempsey Is Eager To Fight (Jack Dempsey), September 11, 1919
- Collins To Play In Sixth World Series This Season (Eddie Collins), September 16, 1919
- Veiock Picks Gleason's Men To Win Series (1919 World Series), The Pittsburgh Press, September 25, 1919
- Leonard Fails To Land Kayo On Johnny Dundee (Benny Leonard/Johnny Dundee), February 10, 1920
- Prospect of Olympic Team Very Bright (1920 Summer Olympics), March 20, 1920
- Indians and Robins, With Victory Apiece, Renew Struggle (1920 World Series), October 7, 1920
- Babe Ruth Is On His Way To New Record (Babe Ruth), April 22, 1921
- Pete Herman Meets Lynch Next Monday (Pete Herman), The Pittsburgh Press, July 20, 1921
- Herman Regains Laurels (Pete Herman), The Pittsburgh Press, July 26, 1921
- Notre Dame Wins By Perfection In Forward Pass, November 9, 1921
- Landis Players' Friend: Warns Magnates Against Keeping Any Man From Advancing In His Chosen Profession (Kenesaw Mountain Landis), December 8, 1921
- 1921 Was Brilliant Year In All Sports Divisions, December 24, 1921
