= 1924 Southern Conference men's basketball tournament =

- Classification: Division I
- Teams: 16
- Site: Municipal Auditorium; Atlanta, GA
- Champions: North Carolina Tar Heels (2nd title)
- Winning coach: Norman Shepard (1st title)
- Top scorer: Jack Cobb (North Carolina) (59 points)

1923–24 Southern Conference men's basketball standings
	Conf.				Overall
Team	W		L	PCT	W		L	PCT
Tulane	10	–	0	1.000	21	–	1	.955
North Carolina†	7	–	0	1.000	26	–	0	1.000
Georgia	7	–	0	1.000	16	–	5	.762
Alabama	5	–	1	.833	12	–	4	.750
Kentucky	6	–	2	.750	13	–	3	.813
Mississippi A&M	8	–	4	.667	13	–	8	.619
Virginia	3	–	2	.600	12	–	3	.800
Tennessee	5	–	5	.500	10	–	8	.556
South Carolina	2	–	2	.500	11	–	9	.550
Georgia Tech	4	–	5	.444	9	–	13	.409
Mississippi	2	–	4	.333	16	–	6	.727
Washington and Lee	2	–	4	.333	9	–	5	.643
NC State	2	–	4	.333	7	–	16	.304
Maryland	1	–	2	.333	5	–	7	.417
Vanderbilt	1	–	3	.250	7	–	15	.318
Florida	0	–	2	.000	5	–	10	.333
Sewanee	0	–	2	.000	2	–	7	.222
Virginia Tech	0	–	4	.000	5	–	13	.278
Auburn	0	–	6	.000	4	–	9	.308
Clemson	0	–	6	.000	2	–	14	.125
LSU	0	–	7	.000	8	–	12	.400
† Southern Conference Tournament winner

The 1924 Southern Conference men's basketball tournament took place from February 28–March 4, 1924, at Municipal Auditorium in Atlanta, Georgia. The North Carolina Tar Heels won their second Southern Conference title, led by head coach Norman Shepard.

== Bracket ==
First round February 29
VMI	19
Maryland	34
Georgia	36
Washington & Lee	24
Alabama	44
Ole Miss	42
Georgia Tech	29
Auburn	35
Tulane	60
South Carolina	23
Mississippi A&M	35
Tennessee	18
North Carolina	41
Kentucky	20
Vanderbilt	42
Clemson	13

Quarterfinals; March 1
Maryland	25
Georgia	29
Alabama	40
Auburn	19
Tulane	30
Mississippi A&M	38
North Carolina	37
Vanderbilt	20

Semifinals; March 3
Georgia	20
Alabama	37
Mississippi A&M	23
North Carolina	33

Finals; March 4
Alabama	18
North Carolina	26

* Overtime game

=== Championship ===
March 4

Alabama 18, North Carolina 26
Pts: Slim Carter 6	Pts: Jack Cobb 15

Municipal Auditorium, Atlanta, Georgia
Attendance: 3,500
Referees: Sutton

== All-Southern tournament team ==
Player	Position	Class	Team
Monk McDonald	G	Senior	North Carolina
K. P. Gatchell	G	Senior	Mississippi A&M
Cartwright Carmichael	F	Senior	North Carolina
Eddie Gurr	F	Senior	Georgia
Slim Carter	C	Junior	Alabama

== See also ==
- List of Southern Conference men's basketball champions
