= 1925 College Basketball All-Southern Team =

The 1925 College Basketball All-Southern Team consisted of basketball players from the South chosen at their respective positions.

== All-Southerns ==
=== Guards ===
- Billy Devin, North Carolina (MB)
- Carl Lind, Tulane (MB)

=== Forwards ===
- Jack Cobb, North Carolina (MB)
- C. Ellis Henican, Tulane (MB)

=== Center ===
- Bill Dodderer, North Carolina (MB)

== Key ==
- MB = selected by Morgan Blake in the Atlanta Journal.
