= 1923–24 North Carolina Tar Heels men's basketball team =

American college basketball season

1923–24 North Carolina Tar Heels men's basketball
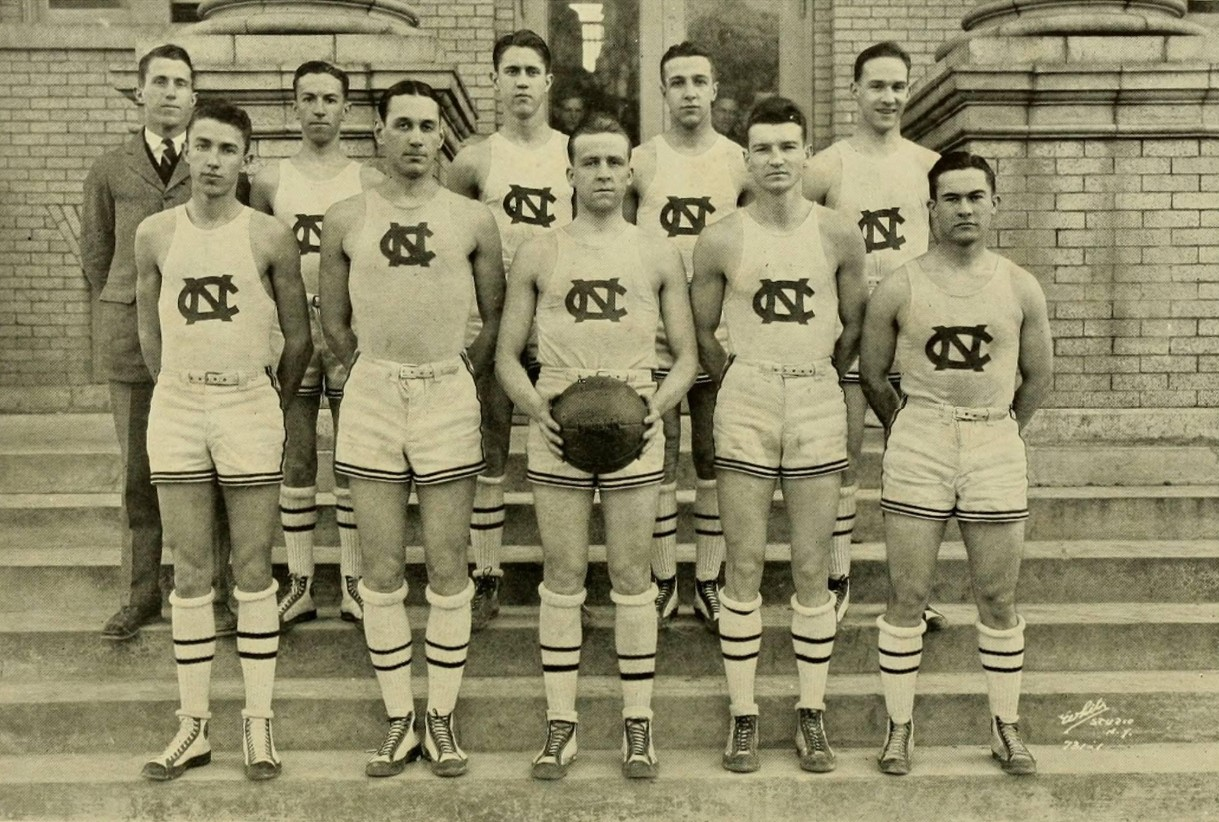

SoCon tournament champion Helms Foundation national champion
- Conference: Southern Conference
- Record: 26–0 (7–0 SoCon)
- Head coach: Norman Shepard (1st season)
- Captain: Winton Green
- Home arena: Tin Can

1923–24 Southern Conference men's basketball standings
	Conf.				Overall
Team	W		L	PCT	W		L	PCT
Tulane	10	–	0	1.000	21	–	1	.955
North Carolina†	7	–	0	1.000	26	–	0	1.000
Georgia	7	–	0	1.000	16	–	5	.762
Alabama	5	–	1	.833	12	–	4	.750
Kentucky	6	–	2	.750	13	–	3	.813
Mississippi A&M	8	–	4	.667	13	–	8	.619
Virginia	3	–	2	.600	12	–	3	.800
Tennessee	5	–	5	.500	10	–	8	.556
South Carolina	2	–	2	.500	11	–	9	.550
Georgia Tech	4	–	5	.444	9	–	13	.409
Mississippi	2	–	4	.333	16	–	6	.727
Washington and Lee	2	–	4	.333	9	–	5	.643
NC State	2	–	4	.333	7	–	16	.304
Maryland	1	–	2	.333	5	–	7	.417
Vanderbilt	1	–	3	.250	7	–	15	.318
Florida	0	–	2	.000	5	–	10	.333
Sewanee	0	–	2	.000	2	–	7	.222
Virginia Tech	0	–	4	.000	5	–	13	.278
Auburn	0	–	6	.000	4	–	9	.308
Clemson	0	–	6	.000	2	–	14	.125
LSU	0	–	7	.000	8	–	12	.400
† Southern Conference Tournament winner

The 1923–24 North Carolina Tar Heels men's basketball team (variously "North Carolina", "Carolina" or "Tar Heels") was the fourteenth varsity college basketball team to represent the University of North Carolina (UNC) as a part of the Southern Conference (SoCon) for the NCAA season. (Note: The school was known as the University of North Carolina until February 1963.) The team went undefeated, and the season was the first played in the Tin Can. The head coach was Norman Shepard, coaching in his first and only season with the Tar Heels. Their fast play and defense won them the 1924 Southern Conference men's basketball tournament.

The Tar Heels by winning the SoCon tournament were named Southern champions, and were retroactively named national champions in 1943 by Bill Schroeder of the Helms Foundation, a Los Angeles-based organization dedicated to the promotion of athletics and sportsmanship. North Carolina has one of the most prestigious college basketball programs, with their first official national championship coming in 1957. The 1924 team is thus one of the school's first great teams, when the nationally prominent athletic schools were in the northeast or midwest rather than the south.

All of the team's players were from North Carolina. The team's high scorer was forward Jack Cobb, known as "Mr. Basketball" and the earliest of eight Tar Heels basketball players who have had their jersey retired. The team also featured All-American Cartwright Carmichael, brother of William for whom the Carmichael Arena is named. Others stars included pivot man Bill Dodderer, and guard and three-sport athlete Monk McDonald, considered the best all-around athlete to ever attend UNC. The team's captain was forward Winton Green.

== Before the season ==
This season, for the first time, each player who was fouled was required to shoot their own free throws. It used to be a shooter from among the players on the court was designated by each team as the person to take all the free throws. In these early days of the sport, there was a "running guard" who dribbled the ball up the court and passed or attacked the basket, like a point or combo guard. (Note: In 1909, continuous dribbling and shots off the dribble was allowed.) There was also a "stationary guard" who made long shots and hung back on defense before there was the rule of backcourt violations. Nobody on the UNC team was taller than 6 feet 4 inches, which in those days was considered exceptionally large.

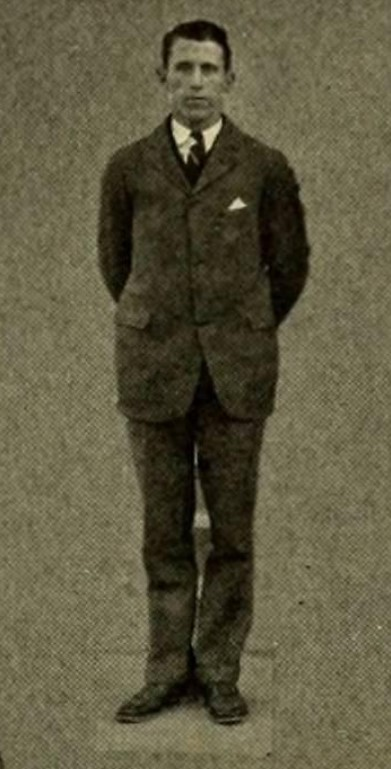
Coach Shepard

The Tar Heels had played the previous two seasons without a coach. The Tar Heel wrote that "If Carolina continues to lead the South in this branch of athletics, a capable coach will have to be employed." On January 16, 1923, it was announced that Graduate Manager of Athletics Charles T. Woollen tapped current law student and Freshman football and basketball coach Norman Shepard to become head coach of the varsity basketball team. Shepard had turned down the opportunity to coach the varsity team prior to their previous season because he felt he was busy coaching the Freshman teams already and was completing his Bachelor of Sciences degree in Commerce. Shepard had played Freshman football and basketball at Carolina in 1919 then left the school for Davidson College where he continued to be an athlete. Shepard had a brief stint in minor league baseball and attended the University of Illinois' coaching school led by football coach Robert Zuppke. After taking the position, Shepard stated: "I hadn't intended to stay in coaching."

Prior to the season, practice was being held three times a week. Expectations were high due to the performance of the team the previous two years, winning the Southern Conference tournament in 1922 and going undefeated in the 1922–23 regular season, only to lose in the tournament due to fatigue and illness. The student-run newspaper, The Tar Heel published a pre-season article where an author wrote: "Carolina has without a doubt the chance of her life to set fire to this neck of the woods during the coming season." Seniors Cartwright Carmichael, Monk McDonald, and Winton Green were cited as being among the best players in the South. Carmichael last season was retroactively selected All-American, the earliest Tar Heel to be selected such for any sport.

The Charlotte Observer wrote that Winton Green, Jack Cobb, and Jimmy Poole were the best looking forwards on the team in their season preview. The writer also expressed belief that the bench for this team was much deeper than that of the 1921–22 conference tournament champions. Poole weighed 120 pounds but was fast and could pass well. Jack Cobb and Billy Devin got promoted to varsity from the previous season's Freshman team. Cobb quickly became known as "Mr. Basketball" on campus. Cobb was versatile on the court and able to shoot, rebound, and pass effectively. Bill Dodderer, star of the 1921 Freshman team, returned to school after a season's absence and got placed on the varsity.

Winton Green was named captain for the team for the 1923–24 season. Monk McDonald had been captain last season, and Carmichael two seasons ago. Guard Carl Mahler who played in the previous season, did not return to school and thus was not a part of the team. Sam McDonald was announced to be returning in early December and thought to be the one to replace Mahler's guard spot, but later did not participate. (Note: There are two reasons reported for Sam McDonald's absence. In North Carolina's yearbook, the Yackety Yack, for the 1923–24 school year, it was written that McDonald believed his schoolwork to be too demanding and did not participate. On March 4, 1924 in an article, The Tar Heel reported that McDonald was declared ineligible for the season and then McDonald served as an assistant coach to Shepard with the Freshman squad.) Monk McDonald was also a medical student, who did not participate in practices due to schoolwork, and was not expected to be on the court until after Christmas. The only reserve not expected to return was Thomas Graham.

Coach Shepard later recalled, "That 1924 team was characterized by quickness and speed...It was a very, very fast team, and we used the fast break effectively...I had inherited a very good group of boys from the team before...Carmichael and Dodderer were exceptionally good...Carmichael and Cobb were so fast and quick with their faking and feinting and breaking, and Carmichael could drive to the basket with unbelievable speed and hold himself in the air for a long time, like he was suspended."

== Roster ==
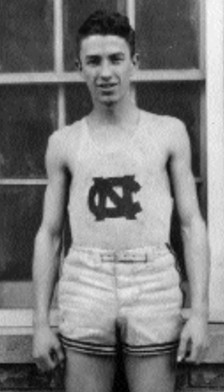
Jack Cobb

1923–24 North Carolina Tar Heels
Name	Position	Year	Hometown	Height
Cartwright Carmichael	C, F, G	Senior	Durham, North Carolina	6'2"
Jack Cobb	F	Sophomore	Durham, North Carolina	6'2"
Billy Devin	C, G	Sophomore	Oxford, North Carolina	5'11"
Bill Dodderer	C, G	Sophomore	Waynesville, North Carolina	6'3"
Winton Green	F, G	Senior	Wilmington, North Carolina	5'10"
Troy Johnson	F	Sophomore	Bessemer City, North Carolina	5'9"
Donald Koonce	F, G	Sophomore	Wilmington, North Carolina	6'0"
Henry Lineberger	G	Senior	Belmont, North Carolina	5'11"
Monk McDonald	G	Senior	Charlotte, North Carolina	5'7"
Sam McDonald	G	Junior	Charlotte, North Carolina	
Dan Penton	G	Junior	Wilmington, North Carolina	
Jimmy Poole	F	Junior	Greensboro, North Carolina	
Johnny Purser	G	Senior	Charlotte, North Carolina	

=== Staff ===
- Head coach: Norm Shepard
- Manager: Bretney Smith

=== Depth chart ===
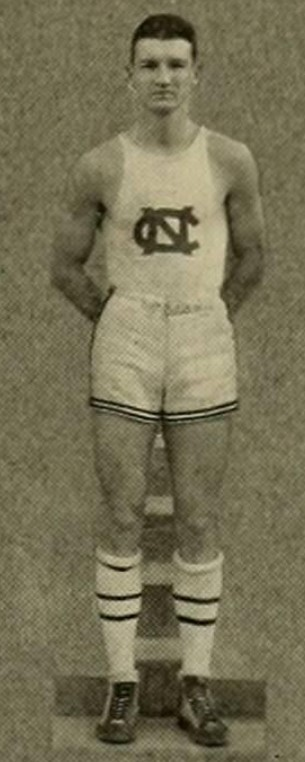
Cartwright Carmichael

==== Starters ====
Name	Position
Sam McDonald	F, G
Monk McDonald	G
Cartwright Carmichael	G, F, C
Jack Cobb	F
Bill Dodderer	G, C

==== Substitutes ====
Name	Position
Billy Devin	C, G
Troy Johnson	F
Don Koonce	G, F
Henry Lineberger	G
Jimmy Poole	F

After Green's injury in the Maryland game, Devin took his spot in the starting five.

== Schedule ==
1923–24 North Carolina Tar Heels
Date time, TV	Opponent	Result	Record	Site (attendance) city, state
Regular season
December 15, 1923*	at Durham Elks	W 33–20	1–0	Durham, NC
December 30, 1923*	at Charlotte YMCA	W 32–29	2–0	Charlotte, NC
January 8, 1924*	Mercer	W 35–23	3–0	Tin Can (2000); Chapel Hill, NC
January 16, 1924*	Guilford	W 50–22	4–0	Tin Can; Chapel Hill, NC
January 19, 1924*	at Davidson	W 37–27	5–0	Charlotte, NC
January 22, 1924*	Durham Elks	W 49–23	6–0	Tin Can; Chapel Hill, NC
January 23, 1924*	at Elon	W 60–13	7–0	Tin Can; Chapel Hill, NC
January 26, 1924*	at Wake Forest	W 32–16	8–0	Wake Forest, NC
January 31, 1924*	Duke; Rivalry	W 31–20	9–0	Tin Can; Chapel Hill, NC
February 2, 1924*	at VMI	W 40–25	10–0	Lexington, VA
February 4, 1924*	at Catholic	W 35–22	11–0	Washington, D.C.
February 5, 1924	at Maryland	W 26–20	12–0 (1–0)	UMD Gymnasium; College Park, MD
February 6, 1924*	at Navy	Cancelled		Annapolis, MD
February 7, 1924*	at Lynchburg	W 36–26	13–0	Lynchburg, VA
February 8, 1924	at Washington and Lee	W 19–16	14–0 (2–0)	Lexington, VA
February 9, 1924	at Virginia	W 33–20	15–0 (3–0)	Charlottesville, VA
February 14, 1924	South Carolina	W 53–19	16–0 (4–0)	Tin Can; Chapel Hill, NC
February 16, 1924*	William & Mary	W 54–16	17–0	Tin Can; Chapel Hill, NC
February 18, 1924	NC State; Rivalry	W 44–9	18–0 (5–0)	Tin Can; Chapel Hill, NC
February 19, 1924*	at Duke; Rivalry	W 23–20	19–0	The Ark; Durham, NC
February 21, 1924*	Wake Forest	W 33–12	20–0	Tin Can; Chapel Hill, NC
February 23, 1924	at NC State; Rivalry	W 41–24	21–0 (6–0)	Raleigh, NC
February 27, 1924	Washington and Lee	W 26–17	22–0 (7–0)	Tin Can; Chapel Hill, NC
Southern Conference tournament
February 29, 1924	Kentucky; SoCon Tournament first round / Rivalry	W 41–20	23–0	Atlanta Memorial Auditorium; Atlanta, GA
March 1, 1924	Vanderbilt; SoCon Tournament quarterfinals	W 37–20	24–0	Atlanta Memorial Auditorium; Atlanta, GA
March 3, 1924	Mississippi State; SoCon Tournament semifinals	W 33–23	25–0	Atlanta Memorial Auditorium; Atlanta, GA
March 4, 1924	Alabama; SoCon Tournament Championship	W 26–18	26–0	Atlanta Memorial Auditorium; Atlanta, GA
*Non-conference game. ^{#}Rankings from AP Poll. (#) Tournament seedings in parentheses.

== Season summary ==
The Charlotte Observer felt Carolina's schedule was "exceptionally hard" and pointed to the Mercer game being a tough one after Christmas break since they were runner's up in the Southern Intercollegiate Athletic Association tournament two seasons ago.

The latter portion of the schedule was revised and announced on January 8, 1924. The alterations mainly involved date changes with games like the Mercer game being moved from January 9 to the 8th, the Washington & Lee and Virginia games swapped dates, and the Durham Elks game that was scheduled for January 4 was pushed back to January 22nd. In addition, there were five open dates revealed. The schedule, as in years past, featured a northern tour that will go through the District of Columbia, Maryland, and Virginia.

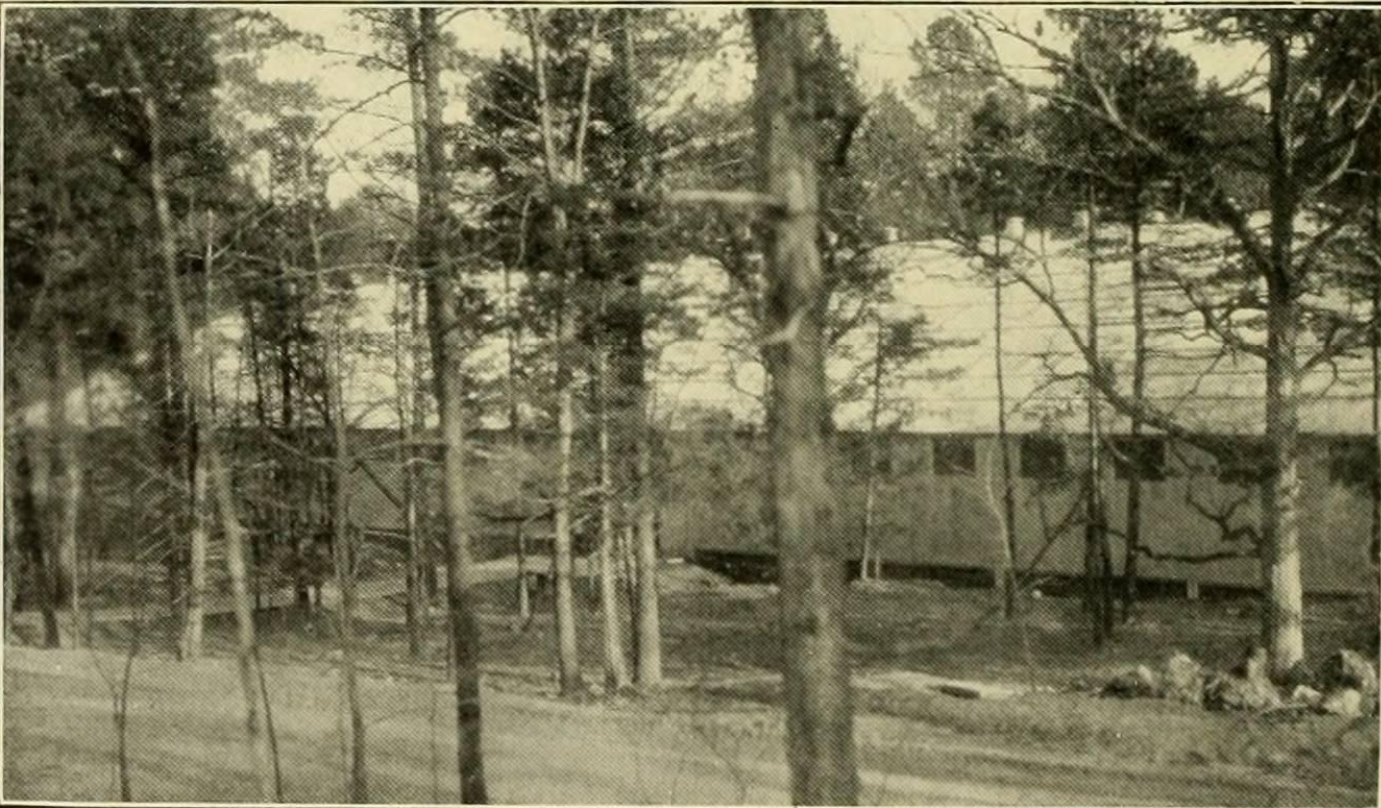
The Tin Can

UNC beat Mercer 35 to 23. "Two thousand spectators, well wrapped in overcoats, shivered away...and saw the "Tin Can" christened with a victory." Cobb scored 14, and Mercer star George Harmon was held to just one field goal. Consuello Smith led Mercer scorers with 8.

Guilford was beaten 50 to 22. Cobb made 10 field goals and the entire Guilford team made 9. All of Carmichael, Cobb, and Dodderer were used at center.

Durham Elks was beaten 49 to 23. The scored was tied 18 to 18 at the end of the first half. UNC outscored Durham Elks 31 to 5 in the second half.

During the Elon game, Cartwright Carmichael was shifted to guard and Bill Dodderer took over at center. What followed was the season's biggest win, 60 to 13. The first half ended 33 to 3. Cobb led scorers with 20. Green had 17. Carmichael had 10 and McDonald had 9.

In the game with Maryland on February 5, captain Green received a Charley-horse which incapacitated him for the rest of the season. Carmichael took over as captain.

=== SoCon Tournament ===
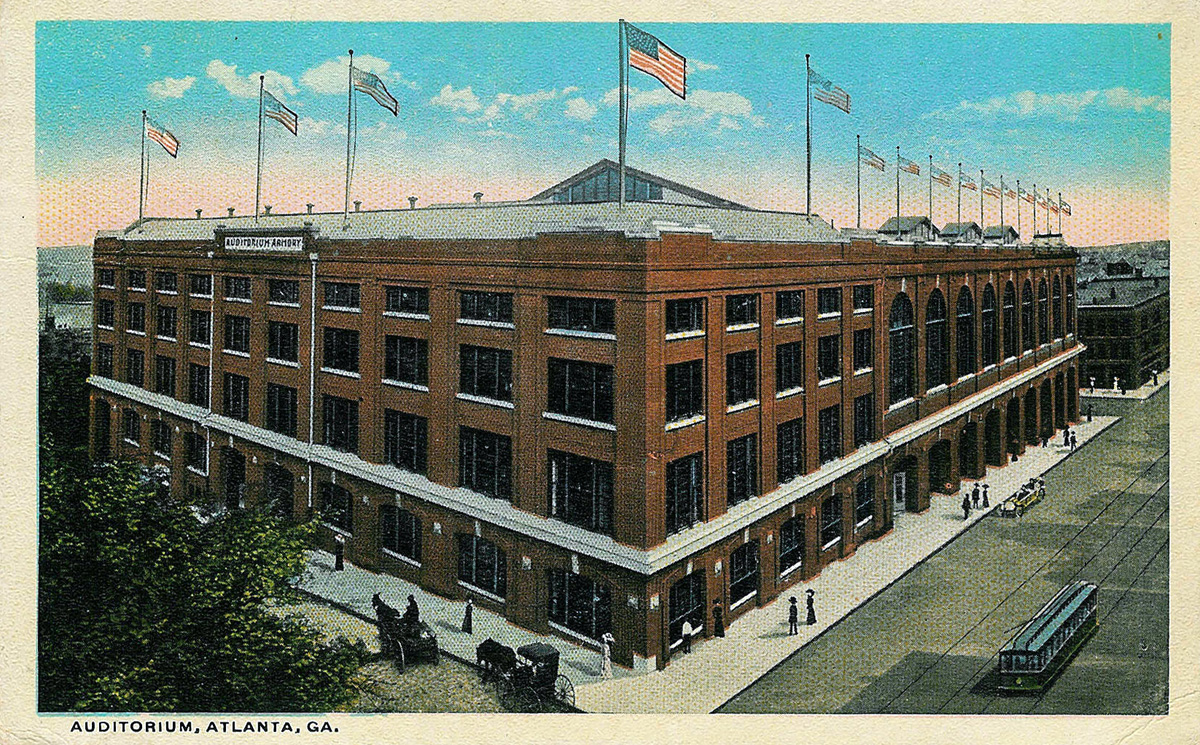
Atlanta Auditorium

On February 29, 1924, UNC beat Kentucky, 41–20, in the first-ever game of the Kentucky–North Carolina rivalry. Kentucky's star player James McFarland had been a high school All-American. Cobb and Carmichael combined for 31 points, "and easily poured in enough shots from long distance to win the game".

On March 1, UNC won 37–20 over a Vanderbilt team coached by Josh Cody and led by Pep Bell. Cobb scored 17.

In the semifinals, UNC defeated the defending SoCon champion Mississippi A&M team led by K. P. Gatchell. A&M's H. G. Perkins, a good shooter from long-distance, (Note: "It is understood from reliable information that a man cannot get on the Aggie squad unless he can make them from beyond the center.") played in the first half despite injuries to his ankle and hand, and could not finish the game. Carmichael and Cobb combined for 25 points.

And in the final, UNC beat Alabama 26–18, coached by Hank Crisp and led by Slim Carter. The game was considered close. "For the first time" since the start of the tournament "the Tarheel was laboring." Alabama was marred by foul trouble. They had two players foul out, and then Carter fouled out, leaving Alabama with only four players. "Captain Carmichael, of North Carolina, waived the rule and insisted on Carter's remaining in the game." Cobb scored 15.

== Aftermath ==
The local news reported that hundreds of students at North Carolina "waited in the streets in front of telegraph offices and cafes" for news about the game and after the victory students "went wild" and set a bonfire on the athletic field. Some 500 students marched to Cobb's house in Durham and woke up the household with fight songs. Head cheerleader Vic Huggins reportedly led a group of around 500 to Durham to welcome the team home after beating Alabama who arrived at around 4 AM local time.

On March 4, The Tar Heel reported that Coach Shepard would be leaving in March for China to work as a representative for the Liggett and Myers Tobacco Company. His departure caused "a great deal of regret" for the student body. Monk McDonald was hired as head coach, and Jack Cobb was elected captain.

Carmichael and Cobb were retroactively named as All-Americans by the Helms Foundation at the Forward position for 1924. The Helms Athletic Foundation retroactively named All-America teams for years 1905–35, and are considered the "official" teams of those years by the NCAA. Carmichael, Cobb, and Monk McDonald made the contemporary All-Southern Conference tournament team by sportswriter Morgan Blake.

In 1943, after spending six months researching material, the Helms Athletic Foundation named the team retroactive national champions. In 2009, the Premo-Porretta Power Poll listed retroactive rankings for the 1895–96 through 1947–48 seasons, and the Tar Heels were deemed the top team for the 1923–24 season.
