= Bill Dodderer =

American basketball player (1901–1990)

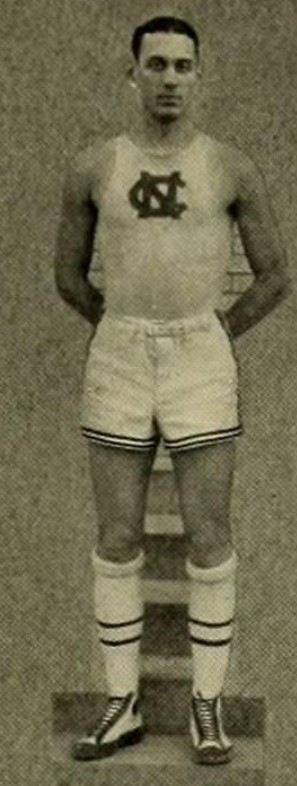

Personal information
- Born: 1901 Atlanta, Georgia, U.S.
- Died: December 3, 1990 (aged 88–89) Atlanta, Georgia, U.S.
- Listed height: 6 ft 3 in (1.91 m)

Career information
- College: North Carolina (1923–1926)
- Position: Center

Career highlights
- Helms national champion (1924); 3x All-Southern (1924–1926)

William A. Dodderer (1901 – December 3, 1990) was a basketball player for the North Carolina Tar Heels, a member of the 1924 national champion team alongside Cart Carmichael and Jack Cobb; he was the center, taking over for Carmichael at that position during the Elon game in 1923–24. He also helped coach. He played on the freshman team in 1921, and sat out of school in 1922.

Dodderer was the resident secretary of the Lumbermen's Mutual Casualty Co.
