= 1926 College Basketball All-Southern Team =

The 1926 College Basketball All-Southern Team consisted of basketball players from the South chosen at their respective positions.

== All-Southerns ==
=== Guards ===
- Artie Newcombe, North Carolina (AJ)
- Paul Jenkins, Kentucky (AJ)

=== Forwards ===
- Jack Cobb, North Carolina (AJ)
- Earl Johnson, Mississippi A&M (AJ)

=== Center ===
- H. L. Stone, Mississippi A&M (AJ)

== Key ==
- AJ = selected by sportswriters in the Atlanta Journal.
