= 1924 College Baseball All-Southern Team =

All-star college baseball team

The 1924 College Baseball All-Southern Team consists of baseball players selected at their respective positions after the 1924 NCAA baseball season.

== All-Southerns ==
Position	Name	School	Notes
Pitcher	Andy Chambers	Georgia	RAC, MN-1
Pitcher	Freddy Sale	Georgia	RAC, MN-1
Pitcher	Scroop Enloe	Georgia Tech	RAC, MN-1
Pitcher	Sam Maphis	Virginia	RAC
Pitcher	Lefty Willis	Oglethorpe	MN-1
Pitcher	Dempster	Trinity	MN-2
Pitcher	Hamilton	Mercer	MN-2
Pitcher	Humphrey	Oglethorpe	MN-2
Pitcher	Wolfe	Wofford	MN-2
Catcher	Joe Palmisano	Georgia Tech	RAC, MN-2
Catcher	Pug Bryant	Oglethorpe	MN-1
Catcher	Pat Powers	Georgia	MN-1
Catcher	Morgan	Mercer	MN-2
First baseman	Connaitzer	Alabama	RAC
First baseman	Bill Dodderer	UNC	MN-2
Second baseman	Skinny Denicke	Georgia Tech	RAC [as U], MN-2
Second baseman	Griffin	Auburn	RAC
Second baseman	Partridge	Oglethorpe	MN-1
Third baseman	Holland	NC State	RAC
Third baseman	Middlebrooks	Georgia	RAC-2
Third baseman	Bush	Mercer	MN-2
Shortstop	Grant Gillis	Alabama	RAC, MN-1 [as 3rd]
Shortstop	Richardson	Georgia	MN-1
Shortstop	Doc Kuhn	Vanderbilt	MN-2
Outfielder	James David Thomason	Georgia	RAC, MN-1 [as 1st]
Outfielder	Doug Wycoff	Georgia Tech	RAC, MN-2
Outfielder	McCoy	Virginia	RAC
Outfielder	Clay Parrish	Oglethorpe	MN-1
Outfielder	Ramsey	Georgia	MN-1
Outfielder	Morris	Oglethorpe	MN-1
Outfielder	Shorty Poore	Mercer	MN-2
Outfielder	Allen	Georgia	MN-2
Utility	Lawrence	Mercer	MN-1
Utility	Scrappy Moore	Georgia	MN-2

== Key ==
RAC = selected by Georgia Tech head coach R. A. Clay.

MN = selected by the Macon News. It had a first and second team
