= Norman Shepard =

American athletic coach (1897–1977)

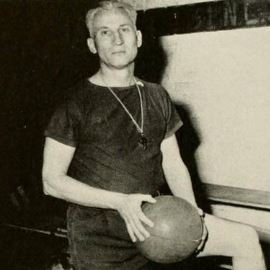
- Shepard circa 1948

Biographical details
- Born: August 20, 1897; Marion, South Carolina, U.S.
- Died: August 22, 1977 (aged 80); Sarasota, Florida, U.S.

Coaching career (HC unless noted)

Football
- 1928: Guilford
- 1929–1935: Randolph–Macon

Basketball
- 1923–1924: North Carolina
- 1928–1929: Guilford
- 1929–1936: Randolph–Macon
- 1937–1949: Davidson
- 1949–1954: Harvard

Baseball
- 1940–1944: Davidson
- 1955–1968: Harvard

Administrative career (AD unless noted)
- 1928–1929: Guilford
- 1929–1936: Randolph–Macon
- 1936–1949: Davidson

Head coaching record
- Overall: 37–27–9 (football); 323–277 (basketball); 234–154–4 (baseball)

Accomplishments and honors

Championships
- Football; 1 Virginia Conference (1931); 3 Chesapeake (1933–1935) Basketball; Helms Athletic Foundation national (1924); SoCon regular season (1924); SoCon Tournament (1924)

Norman Westbrook Shepard (August 20, 1897 – August 22, 1977) was a head coach of various college athletics at several American colleges and universities. He is best known for being the only Division I college basketball coach to go undefeated in his first season coaching. His 1923–24 Tar Heels team finished the season with a 26–0 record, was retroactively named the national champion by the Helms Athletic Foundation, and was retroactively listed as the top-ranked team by the Premo-Porretta Power Poll.

== Background and family ==
He was born Norman Westbrook Shepard, third son of Alexander Hurlbutt Shepard and Mary Augusta Westbrook.

Shepard attended the University of North Carolina and after graduating played minor league baseball for a time. Before becoming a head coach, Shepard spent three years abroad in France during World War I in the United States army as an artilleryman.

In 1928, he married Edith Ruckert, of Brooklyn, NY, in Peking, China.

Norman's family had various ties to athletics at North Carolina. His brother, Bo Shepard, became the head coach for North Carolina after Norman, and two of his other brothers, Carlyle Shepard and Alex Shepard, played basketball for North Carolina.

== Coach of North Carolina Tar Heels ==
Shepard decided to accept the head coaching job for the Tar Heels while planning to attend law school on the side.

When Shepard took over, the Tar Heels had been without a head coach for the previous two seasons. Even though the Tar Heels had been without a head coach for the previous seasons, they had managed to win the Southern Conference Tournament at the end of the 1921–22 season and tied for first in the Southern Conference during the 1922–23 season.

When Shepard took over the team, he inherited a well-rounded Tar Heel squad that included returning senior Cartwright Carmichael, who was the first North Carolina All-American in any sport, and Jack Cobb, who would later be named to the All-American team and would later have his number retired at North Carolina. Shepard's North Carolina team earned the nickname the "White Phantoms" because of their fast playmaking and defense.

The 1923–24 Tar Heels squad managed to win all 26 games they played that year. Because there was no national post-season tournament, the Tar Heels final game was in the Southern Conference tournament against the University of Alabama Crimson Tide. The Tar Heels managed to win the game 26–18. The local news reported that hundreds of students at North Carolina "waited in the streets in front of telegraph offices and cafes" for news about the game and after the victory students "went wild" and set a bonfire on the athletic field.

In 1936, the Helms Athletic Foundation retroactively awarded a national championship to the team since there had been no organization to award national championships at the time. Currently Shepard holds the title of being the only head coach to go undefeated in his first year of coaching.

== Living abroad ==
After coaching North Carolina for one season, Shepard went to the Far East to work as a sales manager for Liggett and Meyer tobacco company. While abroad, he played for and coached a basketball team in the Far Eastern Olympics. Shepard married his wife while in China and returned to the United States after being abroad for five years.

== Return to coaching ==
After returning to the United States, Shepard took coaching jobs at Guilford College, Randolph College, Davidson College and finally Harvard University where he coached baseball, basketball and football. He retired from being the head coach in 1968.

== Head coaching record ==
=== Football ===
Year	Team	Overall	Conference	Standing	Bowl/playoffs
Guilford Quakers (Independent) (1928)
1928	Guilford	5–3			
Guilford:		5–3			
Randolph–Macon Yellow Jackets (Virginia Conference) (1929–1932)
1929	Randolph–Macon	2–5	2–3	6th	
1930	Randolph–Macon	3–5–2	3–2–1	3rd	
1931	Randolph–Macon	7–1–1	5–1	1st	
1932	Randolph–Macon	5–1–2	2–1–2	3rd	
Randolph–Macon Yellow Jackets (Chesapeake Conference) (1933–1935)
1933	Randolph–Macon	3–6		1st	
1934	Randolph–Macon	4–3–2		T–1st	
1935	Randolph–Macon	8–0–2	3–0	1st	
Randolph–Macon:		32–12–9			
Total:		37–27–9			
National championship Conference title Conference division title or championship game berth

=== Basketball ===
Record table
Season	Team	Overall	Conference	Standing	Postseason
North Carolina Tar Heels (Southern Conference) (1923–1924)
1923–24	North Carolina	26–0	7–0	T–1st	Helms National Champion
North Carolina:		26–0	7–0		
Guilford Quakers (Independent) (1928–1929)
1928–29	Guilford	6–12			
Guilford:		6–12			
Randolph–Macon Yellow Jackets (Virginia Conference) (1929–1936)
1929–30	Randolph–Macon	14–7			
1930–31	Randolph–Macon	16–7			
1931–32	Randolph–Macon	7–12			
1932–33	Randolph–Macon	11–11			
1933–34	Randolph–Macon	15–4			
1934–35	Randolph–Macon	11–13			
1935–36	Randolph–Macon	9–11			
Randolph–Macon:		83–65			
Davidson Wildcats (Southern Conference) (1937–1949)
1937–38	Davidson	10–12	4–11	11th	
1938–39	Davidson	19–9	9–7	5th	
1939–40	Davidson	8–13	4–11	11th	
1940–41	Davidson	11–12	5–7	10th	
1941–42	Davidson	12–13	3–8	13th	
1942–43	Davidson	18–6	7–4	4th	
1943–44	Davidson	16–7	3–4	6th	
1944–45	Davidson	9–9	3–6	9th	
1945–46	Davidson	13–12	5–9	12th	
1946–47	Davidson	17–8	7–7	9th	
1947–48	Davidson	19–9	10–7	5th	
1948–49	Davidson	18–8	11–6	5th	
Davidson:		170–118	71–87		
Harvard Crimson (Ivy League) (1949–1954)
1949–50	Harvard	9–15	3–9	6th	
1950–51	Harvard	8–18	3–9	6th	
1951–52	Harvard	5–17	0–12	7th	
1952–53	Harvard	7–16	2–10	7th	
1953–54	Harvard	9–16	2–12	8th	
Harvard:		38–82	10–52		
Total:		323–277			
National champion Postseason invitational champion Conference regular season champion Conference regular season and conference tournament champion Division regular season champion Division regular season and conference tournament champion Conference tournament champion
