= 1923–24 Georgia Bulldogs basketball team =

American college basketball team season

1923–24 Georgia Bulldogs basketball
- Conference: Southern Conference
- Record: 16–5 (7–0 SoCon)
- Head coach: Herman Stegeman (5th season)
- Captain: Ed Gurr
- Home arena: Woodruff Hall

1923–24 Southern Conference men's basketball standings
| | Conf. | | | | Overall |
| Team | W | | L | PCT | W | | L | PCT |
|---|---|---|---|---|---|---|---|---|
| Tulane | 10 | – | 0 | 1.000 | 21 | – | 1 | .955 |
| North Carolina† | 7 | – | 0 | 1.000 | 26 | – | 0 | 1.000 |
| Georgia | 7 | – | 0 | 1.000 | 16 | – | 4 | .800 |
| Alabama | 5 | – | 1 | .833 | 12 | – | 4 | .750 |
| Kentucky | 6 | – | 2 | .750 | 13 | – | 3 | .813 |
| Mississippi A&M | 8 | – | 4 | .667 | 13 | – | 8 | .619 |
| Virginia | 3 | – | 2 | .600 | 12 | – | 3 | .800 |
| Tennessee | 5 | – | 5 | .500 | 10 | – | 8 | .556 |
| South Carolina | 2 | – | 2 | .500 | 11 | – | 9 | .550 |
| Georgia Tech | 4 | – | 5 | .444 | 9 | – | 13 | .409 |
| Mississippi | 2 | – | 4 | .333 | 16 | – | 6 | .727 |
| Washington and Lee | 2 | – | 4 | .333 | 9 | – | 5 | .643 |
| NC State | 2 | – | 4 | .333 | 7 | – | 16 | .304 |
| Maryland | 1 | – | 2 | .333 | 5 | – | 7 | .417 |
| Vanderbilt | 1 | – | 3 | .250 | 7 | – | 15 | .318 |
| Florida | 0 | – | 2 | .000 | 5 | – | 10 | .333 |
| Sewanee | 0 | – | 2 | .000 | 2 | – | 7 | .222 |
| Virginia Tech | 0 | – | 4 | .000 | 5 | – | 13 | .278 |
| Auburn | 0 | – | 6 | .000 | 4 | – | 9 | .308 |
| Clemson | 0 | – | 6 | .000 | 2 | – | 14 | .125 |
| LSU | 0 | – | 7 | .000 | 8 | – | 12 | .400 |
† Southern Conference Tournament winner

The 1923–24 Georgia Bulldogs basketball team represented the University of Georgia as a member of the Southern Conference (SoCon) during the 1923–24 NCAA men's basketball season. Led by fifth-year head coach Herman Stegeman, the Bulldogs compiled an overall record of 16–5 with a mark of 7–0 in conference play, tying for second place in the SoCon. The team captain was Ed Gurr.

== Roster ==
1923–24 Georgia Bulldogs men's basketball team
Players
Coaches

| Pos. | # | Name | Height | Weight | Year | Previous school | Hometown |
|---|---|---|---|---|---|---|---|
| | | R. W. Williams | — | — |
| | | Nolen Richardson | — | — |
| | | Ed Gurr | — | — |
| | | Joe Bennett | — | — |
| | | Charles Wiehrs | — | — |
| | | C.O. Miller | — | — |

Head coach

Herman Stegeman

Assistant coach(es)

Legend

- (C) Team captain
- (S) Suspended
- (I) Ineligible
- (W) Walk-on
- Injured
- Current redshirt

== Schedule ==
| Date time, TV | Opponent | Result | Record | Site city, state |
|---|---|---|---|---|
| 1/1/1924 | Savannah Protestant Club | W 32-19 | 1–0 | Athens, GA |
| 1/2/1924 | Macon YMCA | W 28-22 | 2–0 | Macon, GA |
| 1/3/1924 | at Columbus YMCA | W 47-20 | 3–0 | Columbus, Georgia |
| 1/4/1924 | at Camp Benning | W 36-27 | 4–0 | Columbus, Georgia |
| 1/5/1924 | at Albany YMCA | L 13-24 | 4–1 | Albany, GA |
| 1/9/1924 | at South Carolina | W 38-29 | 5–1 | Columbia, SC |
| 1/10/1924 | at Furman | W 34-20 | 6–1 | Greenville, SC |
| 1/11/1924 | at Clemson | W 24-6 | 7–1 | Clemson, SC |
| 1/16/1924 | at Clemson | W 38-13 | 8–1 | Clemson, SC |
| 1/24/1924 | Furman | W 50-27 | 9–1 | Athens, GA |
| 1/31/1924 | at Auburn | W 32-17 | 10–1 | Auburn, AL |
| 2/1/1924 | North Carolina State | W 49-24 | 11–1 | Athens, GA |
| 2/6/1924 | Auburn | W 33-18 | 12–1 | Athens, GA |
| 2/8/1924 | Florida | W 43-24 | 13–1 | Athens, GA |
| 2/9/1924 | at A.A.C. | L 29-34 | 13–2 | |
| 2/16/1924 | A.A.C. | W 41-18 | 14–2 | Athens, GA |
| 2/22/1924 | at Mercer | L 20-34 | 14–3 | Macon, GA |
| 2/23/1924 | at Mercer | L 19-36 | 14–4 | Macon, GA |
| 3/1/1924 | Washington & Lee | W 36-24 | 15–4 | Athens, GA |
| 3/2/1924 | Maryland | W 29-25 | 16–4 | Athens, GA |
*Non-conference game. (#) Tournament seedings in parentheses.
