= 1923–24 Trinity Blue Devils men's basketball team =

American college basketball season

1923–24 Trinity Blue Devils men's basketball
- Conference: Independent
- Record: 19–6
- Head coach: Jessie Burbage (2nd season)
- Home arena: The Ark

The 1923–24 Trinity Blue Devils men's basketball team represented Trinity College (later renamed Duke University) during the 1923–24 men's college basketball season. The head coach was Jessie Burbage, coaching his second and final season with the Blue Devils. The team finished with an overall record of 19–6.
