= Slim Carter (basketball) =

American college basketball player

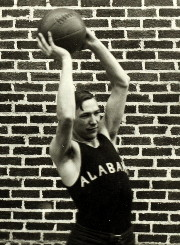

Personal information
- Born: February 19, 1901 Hazel Green, Alabama, US
- Died: June 27, 1950 (aged 49) Knoxville, Tennessee, US

Career information
- College: Alabama (1923–1925)
- Position: Center

Career highlights
- All-Southern (1924)

Leonard M. "Slim" Carter (February 29, 1901 – June 27, 1950) was a college basketball player for the Alabama Crimson Tide under coach Hank Crisp. An All-Southern center, he captained the team in 1924 and 1925. The 1924 team was runner up in the SoCon tournament to the national champion North Carolina. He was also known as a cheerleader. Carter was "good at tip off, fast on his feet, and an accurate cager."

His son died from injuries sustained in basketball.
