= Kentucky–North Carolina basketball rivalry =

American college basketball rivalry

Kentucky-North Carolina basketball rivalry
- Kentucky Wildcats North Carolina Tar Heels
- Sport: Basketball
- First meeting: February 29, 1924; Kentucky 20 – North Carolina 41
- Latest meeting: December 2, 2025; North Carolina 67 - Kentucky 64
- Next meeting: TBD

Statistics
- Total meetings: 44
- All-time series: North Carolina leads 26–18
- Largest victory: Kentucky, 39 points (1950)
- Current win streak: North Carolina, 1 (2025—present)

Locations of Kentucky and North Carolina

The series between two of the most victorious college basketball programs of all time, Kentucky (1st) and North Carolina (3rd), has been a long and eventful one, although only in the mid-1960s was there a sustained series between the two which lasted through the early 1970s. That series was ended and another which began in the late 1980s was aborted early, before the current series started.

== History ==
Men's Basketball Comparison
	Kentucky	North Carolina
First Season	1903	1910
Conference	SEC	ACC
NCAA Championships	8	6
NCAA Tournament Appearances	59*	50
Conference Championships	51*	41
Conference tournament championships	33	26
Consensus 1st Team All-Americans	26	27

=== March 25, 1995: #4 UNC 74, #2 UK 61 ===
Kentucky got off to an early start, however the momentum of the game was broken irreparably part-way through the first half when Andre Riddick and Rasheed Wallace got into an altercation which literally brought the game to a standstill while the officials attempted to sort out the mess. Technicals were called on each player, along with UK's Walter McCarty, who was a part of the altercation.

Once play finally resumed, Kentucky was never able to push the lead despite Wallace sitting on the bench for the remainder of the half. As the game wore on, Kentucky was unable to hit their shots, going an uncharacteristic 7 for 36 from the three-point line. Dean Smith's stated game plan was to guard only Tony Delk from the perimeter. This left many of the UK players (many of them excellent three point shooters) wide open from the perimeter. Unfortunately for Kentucky, all of these players had off shooting nights (on the same night) and UK simply did not capitalize on their open looks. In the end, UK became rattled and could never put together a sustained comeback. UNC was led by Jerry Stackhouse's 18 points along with 18 points from Donald Williams. Much like the aftermath of the 1977 loss, Kentucky was able to regroup from the stinging loss to the Tar Heels and came back to capture the NCAA title the following year.

=== December 2, 2000: UK 93, #6 UNC 76 ===
The first game of the renewed series, held in the Dean Smith Center, found Kentucky at a particularly critical time. Although the season was still early, UK was reeling from poor offensive execution and were saddled with a 1–3 record. Having dropped out of the top 25 ranking, the game on paper looked like a blow-out in favor of the Heels. Not a cheerful situation for Kentucky fans, especially since UK was at the time on the tail end of a 16–6 all-time series record with UNC and with UK not having beaten UNC for over 25 years.

The game was a blow-out, however it was Kentucky which did the damage. With Cliff Hawkins shredding the UNC defense with his penetration and previously unknown Marquis Estill exploding for 19 points, UK rolled to an easy victory and went on to salvage the season. UK's Keith Bogans scored 18 points, but more importantly held UNC's high scoring Joseph Forte (who was also Bogans' former high school teammate at DeMatha (MD)) in check. The game came perilously close to surpassing North Carolina's worst home loss at the Dean Dome, and would have if not for two last-minute 3-point shots by Forte.

=== December 8, 2001: #11 UK 79, UNC 59 ===
On their home court the 11th ranked Wildcats toppled the unranked Tar Heals in an impressive 20 point victory. Tayshaun Prince scored 31-points, had 11-rebounds, four-assists, and four-steals in a 79–59 victory over North Carolina. In scoring Kentucky's first fifteen points, Prince made five consecutive three-point shots to start the game.

=== December 3, 2005: UNC 83, #10 UK 79 ===
North Carolina lost the core of their national championship team, including promising freshman Marvin Williams, the #2 overall pick in the National Basketball Association draft and were an extremely young, inexperienced and unproven team when they arrived in Lexington early in the season. The Wildcats, on the other hand, were a relatively experienced team with what was expected to be a talented sophomore class. The Wildcats began the game as most expected by taking a 16–10 lead, but the young Tar Heels weren't fazed by the Lexington crowd and went on a 15–3 run of their own to claim the lead. North Carolina hit seven three-pointers in the first half en route to a twelve-point lead at halftime 44–32.

Kentucky tightened the margin in the second half, scoring the first seven points after intermission, but could never get over the hump. UNC controlled the boards, mainly due to freshman sensation Tyler Hansbrough and senior David Noel. Other Tar Heels such as Reyshawn Terry (who led all scorers with 25), Bobby Frasor and Wes Miller all contributed key baskets throughout the game, keeping the Wildcats in check. For their part, Kentucky kept the game tight throughout the second half but mental mistakes at key moments and other lapses such as an inability to keep UNC from getting offensive rebounds doomed them to the loss.

=== December 5, 2009: #5 UK 68, #10 UNC 66 ===
Defending National Champion North Carolina opened up the contest with a 9–2 lead until Kentucky, led by freshman John Wall, went on a 28–2 run in the first half. Wall dominated at times while helping the Wildcats build a 19-point first-half lead, then spent 20 anxious minutes in the training room after cramping up. It took a couple of bottles of Gatorade and a bit of teeth grinding by Wall to get back on the floor. The Tar Heels showed grit by eventually climbing within 2 of UK late in the second half. Two Wall free throws with 4.3 seconds left sealed the victory for UK.

The win provided redemption of sorts for Wall, a native of Raleigh, N.C., who grew up wanting to play for the Tar Heels. Though North Carolina pursued him throughout high school, the Tar Heels never offered him a scholarship. The win over North Carolina also pushed UK closer to the first program to reach 2,000 wins.

=== March 27, 2011: #11 UK 76, #7 UNC 69 ===
Coming on the heels of an upset victory over top-seeded Ohio State and a commanding victory over eleventh-seeded Marquette in the 2011 Regional semifinals, the fourth-seeded Wildcats and second-seeded Tar Heels met at the East Regional Final in Newark, New Jersey, to decide the final team to advance to the Final Four. Prior to the game, Kentucky had not been to a Final Four in 13 years, since it won a National Championship in 1998, while North Carolina had recently won National Championships in 2005 and 2009, and a Final Four in between in 2008.

Kentucky made 12 of 22 three-pointers, including Kentucky freshman Brandon Knight scoring 22 points, while the rest of the Kentucky line-up, Darius Miller, Terrence Jones, and Doron Lamb, also drilled threes of their own to give the Wildcats an early confidence boost. Kentucky went into the halftime with a 38–30 lead then made it stand up as North Carolina failed to take advantage when the Wildcats grew skittish with the lead. Kentucky's DeAndre Liggins nailed a three from the corner with 37 seconds remaining that would push Kentucky's lead to 73–69. A seldom-used reserve a year ago who has flourished in his final season, Josh Harrellson again held his own against North Carolina's bigger, more heralded front line, scoring 12 points and grabbing eight rebounds.

=== December 3, 2011: #1 UK 73, #5 UNC 72 ===
In 2011 North Carolina and Kentucky were ranked number one and number two to begin the season. A week prior to the match-up North Carolina lost on the road to the University of Nevada Las Vegas, dropping them to fifth and moving Kentucky up to first in the polls. This match-up was the first time the two schools had met this highly ranked since December 26, 1981 in East Rutherford, New Jersey, when Michael Jordan, James Worthy and Sam Perkins combined for 66 points in North Carolina's 82–69 victory. This matchup had even more media anticipation and included more than two dozen National Basketball Association scouts and front office personnel. Kentucky's young squad that starts three freshmen and two sophomores responded.

The game was a back-and-forth battle throughout. The first half saw North Carolina in control, even commanding a double-digit lead with ten minutes left in the half. In the second half Kentucky climbed back into it, even capturing the lead on a 7–0 run capped by a Doron Lamb three to make the score 63–60 in favor of Kentucky. The final minute was highlighted by high drama. North Carolina's Reggie Bullock hit a 3-pointer to cut the Wildcats' lead to 73–72 with 48 seconds left. After freshman Marquis Teague missed the front end of a one-and-one, Anthony Davis blocked John Henson's game-winning shot, grabbed the rebound, and the Wildcats ran out the clock to win. Kentucky would eventually win the NCAA national title that season.

=== December 14, 2013: #18 UNC 82, #11 UK 77 ===
North Carolina and Kentucky were both ranked in the top 20 coming into this game. At the time of the game, UNC had wins over #1 Michigan State (a team that had beaten Kentucky a month earlier) and #3 Louisville (Kentucky's arch-rival, whom Kentucky would defeat two weeks later), but also unexpected losses to unranked Belmont and UAB. It was a team that tended to play well against good teams and occasionally poorly against inferior teams. Meanwhile, Kentucky had lost to #20 Baylor and the aforementioned Michigan State Spartans (#2 at the time), but had no quality wins to speak of.

The game was an exciting one, with the score remaining close throughout the game. Kentucky took an early 9–4 lead, then held a small lead (1–7 pts) for much of the first half. UNC took their first lead at 24–23 on a Joel James layup with 5:31 left in the 1st half; UNC wasn't able to extend the lead beyond 5 points, and Kentucky eventually regained the lead with 16:03 left in the second half. From there, the score would remain within 4 points until the 12:00 mark, when UNC extended the lead to 6 on Desmond Hubert tip-in. Kentucky would never regain the lead, though UNC was never able to extend the lead into double digits.

Kentucky dominated the boards, pulling down 44 rebounds to the Heels' 32, and scored 19 second-chance points. UNC, however, won the turnover battle 9–17, scored 24 points in transition, and shot a higher field goal percentage for the game (48% vs. 41%). The game featured plenty of fouls by both teams (26 for UNC, 30 for UK) and an unusually high number of free throws for both teams (45 for UNC, 43 for UK).

Paige was the highest scorer for either team, scoring 23 points on 13 field goals and making all 10 of his free throw attempts. He scored 21 of his 23 points in the second half to lead the Tar Heels to the 82–77 victory. James Michael McAdoo also scored 20 points for the Heels, shooting 4 of 6 from the field and making 12 of 19 free throws to go with 5 rebounds and 4 assists.

For the Wildcats, Aaron Harrison led the way with 20 points on 8 of 12 field goals; he also made his only three point shot and all 3 of his free throws attempts. Andrew Harrison, meanwhile, scored 17 points (on 3 of 11 field goals and 10 of 17 free throws), and tallied 6 rebounds and 7 assists. James Young also contributed 16 points (half of which came from the foul line), and Willie Cauley-Stein grabbed 12 rebounds (5 offensive).

However, Kentucky would go on to have the more successful season, making the NCAA championship game after going 12–6 in the SEC (2nd place). UNC fell one game short of the Sweet Sixteen, after starting the ACC 1–4 and then rattling off 12 straight wins, finishing 13–5 for a second place tie in the ACC.

=== March 26, 2017: #5 UNC 75, #6 UK 73 ===
North Carolina was given the #1 seed in the south regional, while Kentucky was given the #2 seed. North Carolina rolled past #16 seed Texas Southern in their first-round game 103–64. In their second-round game, the Tar Heels overcame a late deficit to defeat #8 seed Arkansas 72–65. They then blew past #4 seed Butler in the Sweet Sixteen 92–80, securing a spot in the South Region Final. Kentucky's path included wins over 15 seeded Northern Kentucky in the first round, and a 65–62 win over 10 seeded Wichita State in a rematch from their 2014 NCAA Tournament game. Kentucky was then faced up against #3 seed UCLA in a rematch of the game UCLA won earlier in the season 97–92; Kentucky won 86–75.

North Carolina led the Wildcats the entire first half, finishing with a 38–33 lead. Kentucky answered by beginning the second half with a 6–0 run to take their first lead of the game. North Carolina quickly took the lead back, and held it until the 7:27 mark of the 2nd half when Kentucky tied it at 57. Kentucky then took a 64–59 lead before North Carolina went on a 12–0 run. De'Aaron Fox hit a 3-pointer with 46.8 seconds left; Malik Monk then hit a 3 of his own with 38.5 seconds left to make it 71–70. Justin Jackson answered the three with a breakaway layup to make it 73–70 Tar Heels with 33 seconds left. A very contested three pointer by Malik Monk with 7.2 seconds left tied it up yet again. Carolina passed the ball into Theo Pinson, who ran down the court into the lane. He passed the ball over to Luke Maye, who hit a jumper from just inside the three point line to give the Tar Heels a 75–73 lead with 3 tenths of a second left. The basket has led to many Carolina fans trolling UK fans with chants of "Luke Maye" with a shooting hand extended. The ensuing inbound play gave UNC the ball, and sealed their spot in the Final Four. UNC's win gave them their 20th all time Final Four appearance, the most by any team.

== Results ==
Rankings are from the AP Poll (1936–present)

Kentucky victories	North Carolina victories	Tie games

No.	Date	Location	Winner	Score
1	February 29, 1924^{A}	Atlanta, GA	North Carolina	41–20
2	January 4, 1929	Lexington, KY	North Carolina	26–15
3	February 27, 1932^{A}	Atlanta, GA	North Carolina	43–42
4	January 9, 1950	Lexington, KY	No. 2 Kentucky	83–44
5	December 18, 1959	Lexington, KY	Kentucky	83–44
6	December 13, 1960	Greensboro, NC	No. 20 Kentucky	70–65
7	December 17, 1962	Lexington, KY	North Carolina	68–66
8	December 9, 1963	Lexington, KY	No. 9 Kentucky	100–80
9	December 7, 1964	Charlotte, NC	No. 13 North Carolina	82–67
10	December 13, 1966	Lexington, KY	No. 6 North Carolina	64–55
11	December 12, 1967	Greensboro, NC	No. 7 North Carolina	84–77
12	December 7, 1968	Lexington, KY	No. 2 North Carolina	87–77
13	December 8, 1969	Charlotte, NC	No. 2 Kentucky	94–87
14	December 11, 1972	Louisville, KY	No. 13 North Carolina	78–70
15	December 10, 1973	Greensboro, NC	No. 5 North Carolina	101–84
16	December 9, 1974	Louisville, KY	No. 15 Kentucky	90–78
17	December 8, 1975	Charlotte, NC	No. 4 North Carolina	90–77
18	March 19, 1977^{B}	College Park, MD	No. 5 North Carolina	79–72
19	December 26, 1981	East Rutherford, NJ	No. 1 North Carolina	82–69
20	December 27, 1989	Louisville, KY	No. 24 North Carolina	121–110
21	December 10, 1990	Chapel Hill, NC	No. 10 North Carolina	84–81
22	March 25, 1995^{C}	Birmingham, AL	No. 4 North Carolina	74–61
23	December 2, 2000	Chapel Hill, NC	Kentucky	93–76

No.	Date	Location	Winner	Score
24	December 8, 2001	Lexington, KY	No. 11 Kentucky	79–59
25	December 7, 2002	Chapel Hill, NC	No. 18 Kentucky	98–81
26	January 3, 2004	Lexington, KY	No. 8 Kentucky	61–56
27	December 4, 2004	Chapel Hill, NC	No. 9 North Carolina	91–78
28	December 3, 2005	Lexington, KY	North Carolina	83–79
29	December 2, 2006	Chapel Hill, NC	No. 7 North Carolina	75–63
30	December 1, 2007	Lexington, KY	No. 1 North Carolina	86–77
31	November 18, 2008	Chapel Hill, NC	No. 1 North Carolina	77–58
32	December 5, 2009	Lexington, KY	No. 5 Kentucky	68–66
33	December 4, 2010	Chapel Hill, NC	North Carolina	75–73
34	March 27, 2011^{D}	Newark, NJ	No. 10 Kentucky	76–69
35	December 3, 2011	Lexington, KY	No. 1 Kentucky	73–72
36	December 14, 2013	Chapel Hill, NC	No. 18 North Carolina	82–77
37	December 13, 2014	Lexington, KY	No. 1 Kentucky	84–70
38	December 17, 2016^{E}	Paradise, NV	No. 6 Kentucky	103–100
39	March 26, 2017^{F}	Memphis, TN	No. 6 North Carolina	75–73
40	December 22, 2018^{E}	Chicago, IL	No. 19 Kentucky	80–72
41	December 19, 2020^{E}	Cleveland, OH	No. 22 North Carolina	75–63
42	December 18, 2021^{E}	Las Vegas, NV	No. 21 Kentucky	98–69
43	December 16, 2023^{E}	Atlanta, GA	No. 14 Kentucky	87–83
44	December 2, 2025	Lexington, KY	No. 16 North Carolina	67–64
Series: North Carolina leads 26–18

=== Notes ===
^{A} Southern Conference Tournament
^{B} 1977 NCAA Elite Eight
^{C} 1995 NCAA Elite Eight
^{D} 2011 NCAA Elite Eight
^{E} CBS Sports Classic
^{F} 2017 NCAA Elite Eight

=== Wins by location ===
Category	Kentucky	North Carolina
Atlanta, GA	1	2
Birmingham, AL	0	1
Chapel Hill, NC	2	6
Charlotte, NC	1	2
Chicago, IL	1	0
College Park, MD	0	1
East Rutherford, NJ	0	1
Greensboro, NC	1	2
Las Vegas, NV	1	0
Lexington, KY	8	7
Louisville, KY	1	2
Memphis, TN	0	1
Newark, NJ	1	0
Paradise, NV	1	0
