= Cartwright Carmichael =

American basketball player (1902–1960)

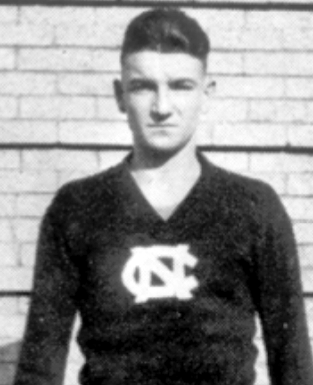
- Carmichael in 1922

Personal information
- Born: December 5, 1902 Durham, North Carolina, US
- Died: December 12, 1960 (aged 58) Winston-Salem, North Carolina, US

Career information
- College: North Carolina (1922–1924)

Career highlights
- 2× All-American (1923, 1924); Helms national champion (1924)

Richard Cartwright "Cart" Carmichael (December 5, 1902 – December 12, 1960) was a college basketball player. He was the first member of the North Carolina Tar Heels to earn All-America honors in any sport, when he was named to the 1923 first team for men's basketball, an honor he also received in 1924. Carmichael could play all three positions: guard, forward, and center. He is the earliest UNC player with his jersey "honored" in the rafters.

Carmichael was a member of the basketball team named 1922 and 1924 "Champions of the South" after winning the Southern Conference tournament at the Atlanta Municipal Auditorium. The 1924 team went undefeated and also had All-American Jack Cobb. The team was retrospectively awarded the 1924 national championship by the Helms Athletic Foundation some eleven years later. In addition to two regular season and two postseason conference championships, Carmichael was a three time All-Southern Conference selection.

In 1922, he and his brother, Billy, became the first brothers to ever play together on the same Tar Heel basketball team. Billy was later vice-president of the Consolidated University of North Carolina and for whom the William D. Carmichael Jr. Auditorium (now Carmichael Arena) on campus was named.

He also lettered as an outfielder for the UNC baseball team, and played football. He also managed the Liggett and Myers Tobacco Co. stemmery.

Coach Norman Shepard later recalled, "That 1924 team was characterized by quickness and speed...It was a very, very fast team, and we used the fast break effectively...I had inherited a very good group of boys from the team before...Carmichael and Dodderer were exceptionally good...Carmichael and Cobb were so fast and quick with their faking and feinting and breaking, and Carmichael could drive to the basket with unbelievable speed and hold himself in the air for a long time, like he was suspended."

== Books ==
- Powell, Adam (2005). "Laying the Foundation: 1910–1911 to 1931–1932". University of North Carolina Basketball. Charleston, South Carolina: Arcadia Publishing. ISBN 978-0-7385-4150-1.
- Kirschner, Steve (2008). Carolina Tar Heel Basketball 2008-09. Chapel Hill, N.C.: UNC Athletic Communications. p. 130.
