= Jack Cobb =

American basketball player (1904–1966)

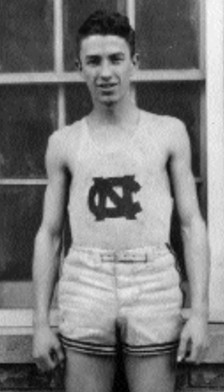

Personal information
- Born: August 4, 1904 Durham, North Carolina, U.S.
- Died: September 9, 1966 (aged 62) Greenville, North Carolina, U.S.
- Listed height: 6 ft 2 in (1.88 m)
- Listed weight: 175 lb (79 kg)

Career information
- High school: Woodberry Forest (Woodberry Forest, Virginia)
- College: North Carolina (1923–1926)
- Position: Forward

Career highlights
- 3× Consensus All-American (1924–1926); 3× All-Southern (1924–1926); National player of the year (1926); Helms national champion (1924); Jersey retired by North Carolina Tar Heels; NC Sports Hall of Fame

John Blackwell "Sprat" Cobb (August 4, 1904 – September 9, 1966) was an American college basketball player at the University of North Carolina at Chapel Hill. Cobb is one of eight Tar Heels basketball players who have had their jersey retired, and was nicknamed "Mr. Basketball".

== Early life ==
John Blackwell Cobb was born on August 4, 1904, in Durham, North Carolina, to Venable Tobacco Company executive James S. Cobb and Nannie Orr. The Cobbs were of English ancestry and Orrs of Scottish ancestry.

=== University of North Carolina ===
Cobb was a member of Kappa Sigma fraternity.

Cobb and Cartwright Carmichael led the Tar Heels to their first undefeated season in 1924. The 1924 team was retroactively named national champion by the Helms Foundation in 1936. Their fast play and defense earned them the nickname the "White Phantoms", used as an alternative nickname for the Tar Heels into the 1940s.

After defeating Alabama in the Southern Conference tournament, some 500 students marched to Cobb's house in Durham and woke up the household with fight songs. He averaged 13.6 points a game. At 6' 2", he was considered a large player for his time.

Cobb went on to play for three straight Southern Conference titles (1924, 1925, 1926). He was also, the first 3-time All-America selection in North Carolina history. Cobb was captain in 1925. Cobb was named national player of the year for 1926 by the Helms Athletic Foundation.

== Later life ==
Cobb's dreams of pursuing a coaching career were dashed when he had a motorcycle accident in 1929 and lost part of his lower right leg. Cobb did continue to coach Little League Baseball teams throughout much of his life.
