= 1922–23 NCAA men's basketball season =

Men's collegiate basketball season

- Helms National Champions: Kansas (retroactive selection in 1943)
- Player of the Year (Helms): Paul Endacott, Kansas (retroactive selection in 1944)

The 1922–23 NCAA men's basketball season began in December 1922, progressed through the regular season and conference tournaments, and concluded in March 1923.

== Season headlines ==
- In February 1943, the Helms Athletic Foundation retroactively selected Kansas as its national champion for the 1922–23 season.
- In 1995, the Premo-Porretta Power Poll retroactively selected Army as its top-ranked team for the 1922–23 season.

== Rule changes ==
- If a defending player interfered with the ball or basket while the ball was on the basket’s rim, a field goal was awarded to the shooting team. Previously, the shooting team had been awarded a free-throw attempt under these circumstances.

== Conference membership changes ==
School	Former conference	New conference
Florida Gators	Southern Intercollegiate Athletic Association	Southern Conference
LSU Tigers	Southern Intercollegiate Athletic Association	Southern Conference
Mississippi Rebels	Southern Intercollegiate Athletic Association	Southern Conference
Sewanee Tigers	Non-major basketball program	Independent
South Carolina Gamecocks	Southern Intercollegiate Athletic Association	Southern Conference
Tulane Green Wave	Southern Intercollegiate Athletic Association	Southern Conference
Vanderbilt Commodores	Southern Intercollegiate Athletic Association	Southern Conference

== Regular season ==
=== Conferences ===
==== Conference winners and tournaments ====
Conference	Regular season winner	Conference player of the year	Conference tournament	Tournament venue (City)	Tournament winner
Big Ten Conference	Iowa & Wisconsin	None selected	No Tournament		
Eastern Intercollegiate Basketball League	Yale	None selected	No Tournament		
Missouri Valley Intercollegiate Athletic Association	Kansas	None selected	No Tournament		
Pacific Coast Conference	Idaho (North); California (South)		No Tournament; Idaho defeated California in best-of-three conference championship playoff series		
Rocky Mountain Athletic Conference	Colorado College		No Tournament		
Southern Conference	North Carolina	None selected	1923 Southern Intercollegiate men's basketball tournament (see note)	Municipal Auditorium (Atlanta, Georgia)	Mississippi A&M
Southwest Conference	Texas A&M	None selected	No Tournament		

NOTE: The 1923 Southern Intercollegiate men's basketball tournament included teams from both the Southern Conference and the Southern Intercollegiate Athletic Association. Although it was a regional rather than conference tournament whose champion claimed the mythical title of "Champions of the South," the Southern Conference considered it the "official" Southern Conference tournament for 1923.

==== Conference standings ====
1922–23 Big Ten Conference men's basketball standings
	Conf.				Overall
Team	W		L	PCT	W		L	PCT
Iowa	11	–	1	.917	13	–	2	.867
Wisconsin	11	–	1	.917	12	–	3	.800
Michigan	8	–	4	.667	11	–	4	.733
Illinois	7	–	5	.583	9	–	6	.600
Purdue	7	–	5	.583	9	–	6	.600
Chicago	6	–	6	.500	6	–	9	.400
Indiana	5	–	7	.417	8	–	7	.533
Northwestern	3	–	9	.250	5	–	10	.333
Ohio State	1	–	11	.083	4	–	11	.267
Minnesota	1	–	11	.083	2	–	13	.133

1922–23 Eastern Intercollegiate Basketball League standings
	Conf.				Overall
Team	W		L	PCT	W		L	PCT
Yale	7	–	3	.700	16	–	3	.842
Princeton	6	–	4	.600	16	–	4	.800
Cornell	6	–	4	.600	15	–	6	.714
Columbia	5	–	5	.500	9	–	7	.563
Dartmouth	3	–	7	.300	14	–	7	.667
Penn	3	–	7	.300	14	–	11	.560

1922–23 Missouri Valley Intercollegiate Athletic Association men's basketball standings
	Conf.				Overall
Team	W		L	PCT	W		L	PCT
Kansas	16	–	0	1.000	17	–	1	.944
Missouri	14	–	2	.875	15	–	3	.833
Drake	10	–	6	.625	10	–	6	.625
Iowa State	9	–	7	.563	10	–	8	.556
Washington University	8	–	8	.500	8	–	10	.444
Nebraska	5	–	11	.313	6	–	12	.333
Oklahoma	5	–	11	.313	6	–	12	.333
Grinnell	3	–	13	.188	3	–	13	.188
Kansas State	2	–	14	.125	2	–	14	.125

1922–23 Pacific Coast Conference men's basketball standings
	Conf.				Overall
Team	W		L	PCT	W		L	PCT
North
Idaho †	5	–	3	.625	27	–	3	.900
Washington	5	–	3	.625	12	–	4	.750
Oregon Agricultural	4	–	4	.500	19	–	7	.731
Washington State	4	–	4	.500	16	–	10	.615
Oregon	2	–	6	.250	15	–	10	.600
South
California	5	–	3	.625	12	–	6	.667
Stanford	5	–	3	.625	12	–	4	.750
USC	2	–	6	.250	5	–	12	.294
† Conference playoff series winner As of 1923

1922–23 Rocky Mountain Conference standings
	Conf.				Overall
Team	W		L	PCT	W		L	PCT
Colorado College	7	–	1	.875	9	–	1	.900
Colorado Mines	6	–	2	.750	7	–	3	.700
Denver	4	–	4	.500	5	–	4	.556
Colorado	1	–	5	.167	1	–	7	.125
Wyoming	0	–	6	.000	2	–	6	.250

1922–23 Southern Conference men's basketball standings
	Conf.				Overall
Team	W		L	PCT	W		L	PCT
North Carolina	5	–	0	1.000	15	–	1	.938
Vanderbilt	2	–	0	1.000	16	–	8	.667
Tulane	5	–	1	.833	15	–	3	.833
Tennessee	3	–	1	.750	15	–	2	.882
Mississippi A&M†	8	–	3	.727	15	–	4	.789
Washington and Lee	4	–	2	.667	7	–	8	.467
Georgia Tech	5	–	3	.625	9	–	9	.500
Alabama	3	–	3	.500	20	–	5	.800
Clemson	3	–	3	.500	11	–	6	.647
Georgia	3	–	3	.500	11	–	8	.579
Auburn	2	–	3	.400	7	–	7	.500
Mississippi	2	–	4	.333	8	–	7	.533
Virginia Tech	1	–	2	.333	13	–	6	.684
NC State	1	–	2	.333	5	–	8	.385
Virginia	1	–	3	.250	12	–	5	.706
South Carolina	0	–	3	.000	6	–	13	.316
Florida	0	–	3	.000	2	–	5	.286
Kentucky	0	–	5	.000	3	–	10	.231
LSU	0	–	6	.000	10	–	10	.500
† Southern Intercollegiate Tournament winner

1922–23 Southwest Conference men's basketball standings
	Conf.				Overall
Team	W		L	PCT	W		L	PCT
Texas A&M	15	–	3	.833	16	–	4	.800
Texas	9	–	7	.563	11	–	7	.611
Rice	7	–	8	.467	10	–	9	.526
Oklahoma A&M	7	–	8	.467	12	–	11	.522
Baylor	7	–	13	.350	7	–	16	.304
SMU	4	–	10	.286	10	–	11	.476

=== Independents ===
A total of 107 college teams played as major independents. Army (17–0) and Franklin (17–0) were undefeated and Southwestern (25–2) finished with the most wins.

1922–23 NCAA men's basketball independents standings
	Conf.				Overall
Team	W		L	PCT	W		L	PCT
Army		–		–	17	–	0	1.000
Franklin		–		–	17	–	0	1.000
Springfield (Mass.)		–		–	15	–	1	.938
Hardin–Simmons		–		–	13	–	1	.929
North Texas State		–		–	13	–	1	.929
Penn State		–		–	13	–	1	.929
Southwestern (Kan.)		–		–	25	–	2	.926
Akron		–		–	12	–	1	.923
CCNY		–		–	12	–	1	.923
Denison		–		–	12	–	1	.923
Washington College		–		–	21	–	2	.913
Marquette		–		–	19	–	2	.905
Carleton		–		–	17	–	2	.895
Duquesne		–		–	16	–	2	.889
Montana State		–		–	18	–	3	.857
Western Kentucky State		–		–	12	–	2	.857
Arizona		–		–	17	–	3	.850
Butler		–		–	17	–	3	.850
DePauw		–		–	15	–	3	.833
Rensselaer		–		–	15	–	3	.833
Grove City		–		–	19	–	4	.826
North Dakota Agricultural		–		–	14	–	3	.824
Concordia Seminary		–		–	9	–	2	.818
Indiana State		–		–	20	–	5	.800
Rutgers		–		–	11	–	3	.786
Navy		–		–	14	–	4	.778
Niagara		–		–	13	–	4	.765
UCLA		–		–	12	–	4	.750
Valparaiso		–		–	15	–	5	.750
West Texas State		–		–	12	–	4	.750
Western State Normal		–		–	17	–	6	.739
Bradley		–		–	14	–	5	.737
Harvard		–		–	14	–	5	.737
Georgetown		–		–	8	–	3	.727
Saint Francis (N.Y.)		–		–	21	–	8	.724
Colgate		–		–	13	–	5	.722
Xavier		–		–	13	–	5	.722
Canisius		–		–	10	–	4	.714
Temple		–		–	10	–	4	.714
Wake Forest		–		–	12	–	5	.706
New Mexico A&M		–		–	14	–	6	.700
Bowling Green State		–		–	9	–	4	.692
Rhode Island State		–		–	9	–	4	.692
Richmond		–		–	9	–	4	.692
Creighton		–		–	11	–	5	.688
Trinity (N.C.)		–		–	15	–	7	.682
Kalamazoo		–		–	17	–	8	.680
Tempe Normal		–		–	8	–	4	.667
Mount Union		–		–	12	–	6	.667
Northern Colorado		–		–	10	–	5	.667
Pittsburgh		–		–	10	–	5	.667
Seton Hall		–		–	8	–	4	.667
Utah State		–		–	8	–	4	.667
Vermont		–		–	12	–	6	.667
William & Mary		–		–	8	–	4	.667
Fairmount		–		–	13	–	7	.650
West Virginia		–		–	12	–	7	.632
Wabash		–		–	17	–	10	.630
Santa Clara		–		–	10	–	6	.625
Union (N.Y.)		–		–	10	–	6	.625
Utah		–		–	5	–	3	.625
Villanova		–		–	10	–	6	.625
Furman		–		–	11	–	7	.611
Lafayette		–		–	12	–	8	.600
Miami (Ohio)		–		–	9	–	6	.600
Cincinnati		–		–	13	–	9	.591
Brigham Young		–		–	7	–	5	.583
Buffalo		–		–	7	–	5	.583
Manhattan		–		–	7	–	5	.583
Ohio		–		–	11	–	8	.579
VMI		–		–	8	–	6	.571
St. Bonaventure		–		–	13	–	10	.565
Detroit		–		–	9	–	7	.563
Wooster		–		–	10	–	8	.556
Loyola (Md.)		–		–	6	–	5	.545
Connecticut		–		–	8	–	7	.533
Michigan State Normal		–		–	10	–	9	.526
St. John's (N.Y.)		–		–	11	–	10	.524
The Citadel		–		–	5	–	5	.500
Davidson		–		–	9	–	9	.500
Dayton		–		–	8	–	8	.500
New York University		–		–	6	–	6	.500
Northern Arizona Normal		–		–	6	–	6	.500
Saint Louis		–		–	5	–	5	.500
Lehigh		–		–	9	–	10	.474
Muhlenberg		–		–	9	–	10	.474
St. Joseph's		–		–	7	–	8	.467
Notre Dame		–		–	10	–	12	.455
Bucknell		–		–	9	–	11	.450
Loyola (Ill.)		–		–	5	–	7	.417
Kent State Normal		–		–	4	–	6	.400
Syracuse		–		–	8	–	12	.400
Washburn		–		–	6	–	9	.400
Brown		–		–	6	–	10	.375
Holy Cross		–		–	7	–	13	.350
Montana		–		–	7	–	14	.333
George Washington		–		–	4	–	11	.267
Marshall		–		–	1	–	3	.250
Tulsa		–		–	1	–	3	.250
New Mexico		–		–	2	–	7	.222
Saint Mary's (Calif.)		–		–	2	–	7	.222
Toledo		–		–	2	–	7	.222
Texas Christian		–		–	3	–	13	.188
Sewanee		–		–	1	–	6	.143
Texas State M&M		–		–	1	–	6	.143
Boston University		–		–	0	–	2	.000
Colorado Agricultural		–		–	0	–	1	.000

== Awards ==
=== Helms College Basketball All-Americans ===
The practice of selecting a Consensus All-American Team did not begin until the 1928–29 season. The Helms Athletic Foundation later retroactively selected a list of All-Americans for the 1922–23 season.

Player	Team
Charlie Black	Kansas
Arthur Browning	Missouri
Herb Bunker	Missouri
Cartwright Carmichael	North Carolina
Paul Endacott	Kansas
Al Fox	Idaho
Ira McKee	Navy
Arthur Loeb	Princeton
James Lovley	Creighton
John Luther	Cornell

=== Major player of the year awards ===
- Helms Player of the Year: Paul Endacott, Kansas (retroactive selection in 1944)

== Coaching changes ==
A number of teams changed coaches during the season and after it ended.

Team	Former Coach	Interim Coach	New Coach	Reason
Alabama	Charles A. Bernier		Hank Crisp	
Arizona	James Pierce		Basil Stanley	
Army	Harry A. Fisher		John Van Vliet	
Tempe Normal	Ernest C. Wills		Aaron McCreary	
Bowling Green State	Allen Snyder		Ray B. McCandless	
Brown	Walter Snell		Harold Evans	
Bucknell	Clarence Glass		Moose McCormick	
Clemson	E. J. Stewart		Bud Saunders	Stewart left to coach at Texas.
Connecticut	Roy J. Guyer		Sumner Dole	
Davidson	H. M. Grey		William L. Younger	
Dayton	Van F. Hill		Harry Baujan	
Denver	Ralph Woods		Aubrey Devine	
Detroit	Paul Harbrecht		John Barrett	
Duquesne	Eugene McGuigan		Bill Campbell	
Fairmount	Lamar Hoover		Sam H. Hill	
Florida	Check Byrd		James L. White	
George Washington	Bryan Morse		Jack Dailey	
Georgetown	Jackie Maloney		John O'Reilly	After a two-season absence due to poor health, O'Reilly was able to return to the head coaching position for the following season, and Maloney stepped aside.
Illinois State	Harrison Russell		Clifford E. Horton	
Indiana State	Birch Bayh		Arthur L. Strum	
Kent State Normal	Paul G. Chandler		Frank Harsh	
Louisiana State	Tad Gormley		Moon Ducote	
Loyola (Md.)	Stan Cook		William Schuerholz	
Loyola (Ill.)	Jack Tierney		Lenny Sachs	
Marshall	J. E. R. Barnes		Bill Strickling	
NC State	Harry Hartsell		Richard Crozier	
Nebraska	Owen A. Frank		William G. Kline	
Nevada	Ray Courtright		Doc Martie	
Niagara	John F. Blake		Pete Dwyer	
Notre Dame	Walter Halas		George Keogan	Halas left to coach basketball, football, and baseball at Mount St. Mary's.
NYU	Ed Thorp		Howard Cann	
Oregon	George Bohler		William Reinhart	
Princeton	Hill Zahn		Albert Wittmer	
Rice	Philip Arbuckle		Pete Cawthon	
Santa Clara	Joe Aurrecoechea		Eddie Kienholz	
St. Bonaventure	Al Carmont		Glen Carberry	
Temple	M. Francois Dienes		Samuel Dienes	
Texas	Milton Romney		E. J. Stewart	
Texas Christian	John McKnight		Matty Bell	
Toledo	Claude H. Watts		Darrell Fox	
Texas State M&M	Tommy Dwyer		Jack C. Vowell	
Valparaiso	Earl Goheen		William Shadoan	
Vanderbilt	Wallace Wade		Josh Cody	
Virginia Tech	William L. Younger		B. C. Cubbage	Younger left and began coaching at Davidson.
Wake Forest	Phil Utley		Hank Garrity	
