= 1921–22 Georgetown Hoyas men's basketball team =

American college basketball season

1921–22 Georgetown Hoyas men's basketball
- Conference: Independent
- Record: 11–3
- Head coach: James Colliflower (4th season)
- Captain: Joe O'Connell
- Home arena: Ryan Gymnasium

The 1921–22 Georgetown Hoyas men's basketball team represented Georgetown University during the 1921–22 NCAA college basketball season. With John O'Reilly unable to coach due to illness, James Colliflower – a 1906 Georgetown graduate who played for Georgetown while at law school and then had coached the team for three seasons from 1911 to 1914 – returned to coach the team for one more season without pay. Georgetown was an independent and played its home games at Ryan Gymnasium on the Georgetown campus in Washington, D.C., and finished the season with a record of 11–3.

== Season recap ==
On-campus Ryan Gymnasium, where the Hoyas had played their home games since the 1914–15 season, had no seating, accommodating fans on a standing-room only-basis on an indoor track above the court. This precluded the accommodation of significant crowds, providing the self-sustaining Basketball Association with little revenue with which to fund the team's travel expenses and generally limiting Georgetown to an annual trip to Annapolis, Maryland, to play at Navy and trips to New York to play schools there, averaging no more than three road games a year from the 1918-19 season to the 1926–27 season in order to keep travel to a minimum. The 1921–22 team did not even visit Navy, but did make a trip to New York and New Jersey for three games at the end of the season. Otherwise, its only road game was a trip across town to play at George Washington.

The Hoyas' home winning streak at Ryan Gymnasium reached 44 games at the end of this season, dating back to a victory against Bucknell on the last day of the 1916–17 season; it would reach 52 before finally coming to an end during the 1923–24 season. A highlight of the home season at Ryan was a major upset when Georgetown defeated highly rated Kentucky, which had won the first Southern Conference championship the previous season. Georgetown also defeated crosstown rival George Washington twice this season, giving the Hoyas a 16-game winning streak against George Washington – 11 of the wins at Ryan Gymnasium – dating back to 1915.

Senior forward Jack Flavin was the team's second-highest scorer. An excellent shooter, he played in 13 games and scored 93 points for a 7.2-point-per-game average for the season.

Senior guard Andrew "Andy" Zazzali saw reduced playing time this season because of injuries and because Georgetown chose to put younger players on the court. He nonetheless played in 13 games, scoring 38 points for the season and averaging 2.9 points per game. He made a running jump shot late in the Kentucky game that helped in the upset of the Wildcats, and that helped him win back a starting role in the later part of the season.

In this era, each team was allowed to designate a single player to shoot all of its free throws, and junior forward Paul Florence was that player this season for Georgetown. He scored 18 points in the season opener against St. Joseph's and led the team in scoring for the year, appearing in 12 games, scoring 136 points, and averaging 11.3 points per game for the season. He played a key defensive role in the upset of Kentucky.

The team began the season with an 11-game winning streak, but lost all three games of its season-ending road trip to finish at 11–3.

== Roster ==
Georgetown players did not wear numbers on their jerseys this season. The first numbered jerseys in Georgetown men's basketball history would not appear until the 1933–34 season.

Name	Height	Weight (lbs.)	Position	Class	Hometown	Previous Team(s)
Al Brogan	N/A	N/A	G	Fr.	Newark, NJ, U.S.	N/A
Paul Byrne	N/A	N/A	G	Jr.	N/A	N/A
George Carney	N/A	N/A	G	Sr.	N/A	N/A
Jack Flavin	5'11"	175	F	Sr.	Portland, ME, U.S.	Portland HS
Paul Florence	6'1"	178	G	Jr.	Chicago, IL, U.S.	Loyola Academy
Jack McGowan	N/A	N/A	F	So.	N/A	N/A
Jack McGrath	N/A	N/A	F	N/A	N/A	N/A
Charley O'Byrne	N/A	N/A	F	N/A	N/A	N/A
Joe O'Connell	N/A	N/A	C	Sr.	N/A	N/A
Al Schmitt	N/A	N/A	F	Fr.	Buffalo, NY, U.S.	Canisius
Jack Smith	N/A	N/A	F	N/A	N/A	N/A
Jim Sweeney	N/A	N/A	G	Fr.	Boston, MA, U.S.	N/A
Andy Zazzali	N/A	N/A	G	Sr.	Baltimore, MD, U.S.	Mount St. Joseph HS

== 1921–22 schedule and results ==
It was common practice at this time for colleges and universities to include non-collegiate opponents in their schedules, with the games recognized as part of their official record for the season, so the February 20, 1922, game against the Crescent Athletic Club counted as part of Georgetown's won-loss record for 1921–22. It was not until 1952, after the completion of the 1951–52 season, that the National Collegiate Athletic Association (NCAA) ruled that colleges and universities could no longer count games played against non-collegiate opponents in their annual won-loss records.

Date time, TV	Opponent	Result	Record	Site city, state
Regular Season
N/A no, no	St. Joseph's	W 53–15	1-0	Ryan Gymnasium; Washington, DC
N/A no, no	at George Washington	W 27–14	2-0	Central Coliseum; Washington, DC
Wed., Jan. 18, 1922 no, no	Villanova	W 39–34	3-0	Ryan Gymnasium; Washington, DC
N/A no, no	St. Francis (Pa.)	W 48–10	4-0	Ryan Gymnasium; Washington, DC
N/A no, no	Lebanon Valley	W 41–36	5-0	Ryan Gymnasium; Washington, DC
N/A no, no	George Washington	W 38–16	6-0	Ryan Gymnasium; Washington, DC
N/A no, no	Dickinson	W 24–19	7-0	Ryan Gymnasium; Washington, DC
Mon., Feb. 6, 1922 no, no	West Virginia	W 27–15	8-0	Ryan Gymnasium; Washington, DC
Sun., Feb. 12, 1922 no, no	Kentucky	W 28–23	9-0	Ryan Gymnasium; Washington, DC
N/A no, no	Marietta	W 33–22	10-0	Ryan Gymnasium; Washington, DC
N/A no, no	Bucknell	W 28–22	11-0	Ryan Gymnasium; Washington, DC
Mon., Feb. 20, 1922 no, no	at Crescent Athletic Club	L 24–25	11-1	N/A; New York, NY
Tue., Feb. 21, 1922 no, no	at New York University	L 17–31	11-2	University Heights Gymnasium; New York, NY
Wed., Feb. 22, 1922 no, no	at Rutgers	L 27–44	11-3	Ballantine Gymnasium; New Brunswick, NJ
*Non-conference game. (#) Tournament seedings in parentheses.
