= 1920–21 Georgetown Hoyas men's basketball team =

American college basketball season

1920–21 Georgetown Hoyas men's basketball
- Conference: Independent
- Record: 10–4
- Head coach: John O'Reilly (7th season)
- Captain: Jack Flavin
- Home arena: Ryan Gymnasium

The 1920–21 Georgetown Hoyas men's basketball team represented Georgetown University during the 1920–21 NCAA college basketball season. John O'Reilly coached the team in his seventh season as head coach. Georgetown was an independent and played its home games at Ryan Gymnasium on the Georgetown campus in Washington, D.C. and finished the season with a record of 10–4.

== Season recap ==
On-campus Ryan Gymnasium, where the Hoyas had played their home games since the 1914–15 season, had no seating, accommodating fans on a standing-room only-basis on an indoor track above the court. This precluded the accommodation of significant crowds, providing the self-sustaining Basketball Association with little revenue with which to fund the team's travel expenses, and Georgetown averaged no more than three road games a year from the 1918-19 season through the 1926–27 season in order to keep travel to a minimum. The 1920–21 team's only road trip outside of Washington was to play schools in Pennsylvania at the end of the season.

The Hoyas' home winning streak at Ryan Gymnasium reached 34 games at the end of this season, dating back to a victory against Bucknell on the last day of the 1916–17 season; it would reach 52 before finally coming to an end during the 1923–24 season. Highlights of the home season at Ryan included Georgetown's upsets of Georgia Tech and North Carolina, two of the most highly regarded teams in the United States at the time. Georgetown also defeated crosstown rival George Washington twice this season, giving the Hoyas a 14-game winning streak against George Washington – 10 of the wins at Ryan Gymnasium – dating back to 1915.

Junior forward Jack Flavin was the team's highest scorer, scoring about a third of the team's points. An excellent shooter, he averaged 12.5 points per game, and scored a total of 175 points.

Junior guard Andrew "Andy" Zazzali played in all 14 games, averaging 4.8 points per game and scoring a total of 65 points. He played an excellent defense during the season; over a stretch of five games that included games against nationally renowned St. John's, North Carolina, and Georgia Tech, his defense played a major role in holding opponents to an average of less than six points in the first half.

Sophomore forward Paul Florence was the only new player on the team, which had finished with a 13–1 record the previous season. He was a very accurate shooter, and despite being surrounded by veterans led the team in its season-opening 10-game winning streak. He finished second in scoring, appearing in 12 games, scoring 72 points, and averaging 6.0 points per game for the season.

The team won its first 10 games, nine of them at home and one across town against George Washington. It then finished the season by losing all four games on its only road trip to end with a 10–4 record.

O'Reilly fell ill after this season and was unable to coach the Hoyas for the next two seasons. He returned to the head coaching position in time for the 1923–24 season.

== Roster ==
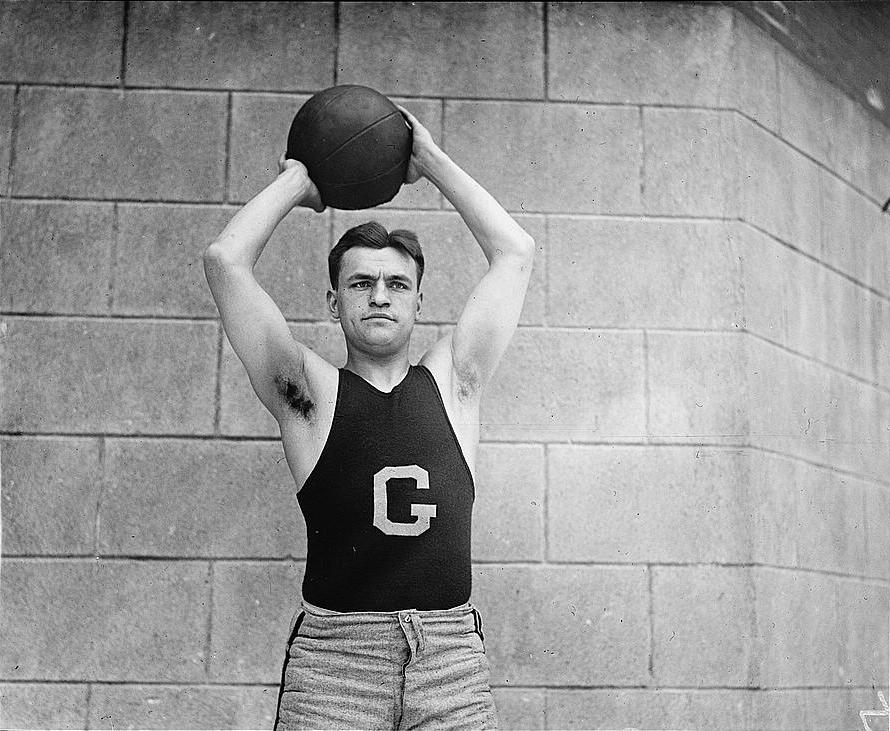
Forward Bill Dudack, seen in 1920, was a senior in 1920-21 and lettered for the team. After graduating in 1921, he returned to Georgetown to coach the 1929–30 team.

Georgetown players did not wear numbers on their jerseys this season. The first numbered jerseys in Georgetown men's basketball history would not appear until the 1933–34 season.

Senior forward Bill Dudack later served as the Hoyas' head coach during the 1929–30 season.

Name	Height	Weight (lbs.)	Position	Class	Hometown	Previous Team(s)
Paul Byrne	N/A	N/A	G	So.	N/A	N/A
George Carney	N/A	N/A	G	Jr.	N/A	N/A
Bill Dudack	N/A	N/A	F	Sr.	New Britain, CT, U.S.	New Britain HS
Jack Flavin	5'11"	175	F	Jr.	Portland, ME, U.S.	Portland HS
Paul Florence	6'1"	178	G	So.	Chicago, IL, U.S.	Loyola Academy
J. R. Knox	N/A	N/A	F	N/A	N/A	N/A
Joe O'Connell	N/A	N/A	C	Jr.	N/A	N/A
James Swift	N/A	N/A	F	Fr.	N/A	N/A
Andy Zazzali	N/A	N/A	G	Jr.	Baltimore, MD, U.S.	Mount St. Joseph HS

== 1920–21 schedule and results ==
It was common practice at this time for colleges and universities to include non-collegiate opponents in their schedules, with the games recognized as part of their official record for the season. As a result, the January 24, 1921, game against a United States Army team from Camp A. A. Humphreys in Virginia counted as part of Georgetown's won-loss record for 1920–21. It was not until 1952, after the completion of the 1951–52 season, that the National Collegiate Athletic Association (NCAA) ruled that colleges and universities could no longer count games played against non-collegiate opponents in their annual won-loss records.

Date time, TV	Opponent	Result	Record	Site city, state
Regular Season
Fri., Jan. 14, 1921 no, no	Carnegie Tech	W 37–27	1-0	Ryan Gymnasium; Washington, DC
Tue., Jan. 18, 1921 no, no	George Washington	W 26–19	2-0	Ryan Gymnasium; Washington, DC
Fri., Jan. 21, 1921 no, no	Davis & Elkins	W 54–27	3-0	Ryan Gymnasium; Washington, DC
Mon., Jan. 24, 1921 no, no	Camp A. A. Humphreys	W 35–20	4-0	Ryan Gymnasium; Washington, DC
Fri., Jan. 28, 1921 no, no	Brooklyn Polytechnic	W 38–30	5-0	Ryan Gymnasium; Washington, DC
Fri., Feb. 4, 1921 no, no	North Carolina	W 39–20	6-0	Ryan Gymnasium; Washington, DC
Fri., Feb. 11, 1921 no, no	St. John's	W 51–15	7-0	Ryan Gymnasium; Washington, DC
Mon., Feb. 14, 1921 no, no	Georgia Tech	W 37–14	8-0	Ryan Gymnasium; Washington, DC
Thu., Feb. 17, 1921 no, no	Marietta	W 29–21	9-0	Ryan Gymnasium; Washington, DC
Sun., Feb. 20, 1921 no, no	at George Washington	W 25–18	10-0	YMCA Hall; Washington, DC
Tue., Feb. 22, 1921 no, no	at Pittsburgh	L 32–34	10-1	Trees Gymnasium; Pittsburgh, PA
Wed., Feb. 23, 1921 no, no	at Geneva	L forfeit	10-2	N/A; Geneva, PA
Sun., Feb. 27, 1921 no, no	at Grove City	L 22–33	10-3	N/A; Grove City, PA
Mon., Feb. 28, 1921 no, no	at Carnegie Tech	L 30–32	10-4	N/A; Pittsburgh, PA
*Non-conference game. (#) Tournament seedings in parentheses.
