= 1922–23 Georgetown Hoyas men's basketball team =

American college basketball season

1922–23 Georgetown Hoyas men's basketball
- Conference: Independent
- Record: 8–3
- Head coach: Jackie Maloney (1st season)
- Captain: Andy Zazzali
- Home arena: Ryan Gymnasium

The 1922–23 Georgetown Hoyas men's basketball team represented Georgetown University during the 1922–23 NCAA college basketball season. With John O'Reilly unable to coach due to illness for the second straight season, freshman basketball team coach John "Jackie" Maloney – a 1918 Georgetown graduate who had quarterbacked the Georgetown football team in the late 1910s and then was head coach of the football team in 1923 – coached the team for a single season. Georgetown was an independent and played its home games at Ryan Gymnasium on the Georgetown campus in Washington, D.C., and finished the season with a record of 8–3.

== Season recap ==
During this era, faculty members opposed players missing classes for road games. Furthermore, on-campus Ryan Gymnasium, where the Hoyas had played their home games since the 1914–15 season, had no seating, accommodating fans on a standing-room only-basis on an indoor track above the court. This precluded the accommodation of significant crowds, providing the self-sustaining Basketball Association with little revenue with which to fund the team's travel expenses and limiting Georgetown to a very limited road schedule between the 1918–19 and 1926–27 seasons – often only to an annual trip to Annapolis, Maryland, to play at Navy and sometimes a single trip to New York or Pennsylvania to play schools there – averaging no more than three road games a year in order to keep travel expenses and missed classes to a minimum. The 1922–23 squad made a three-game trip to Western New York to play games in Rochester and Buffalo and otherwise traveled only to Annapolis to play Navy during the season. Two of its scheduled games were cancelled, and it played only 11 games, finishing with a record of 8–3.

The Hoyas' home winning streak at Ryan Gymnasium reached 50 games at the end of this season, dating back to a victory against Bucknell on the last day of the 1916–17 season; it would reach 52 the following season before finally coming to an end. Georgetown also defeated crosstown rival George Washington this season, giving the Hoyas a 17-game winning streak against George Washington – 11 of them wins at Ryan Gymnasium – dating back to 1915.

Georgetown gave starring forward Jack Flavin a fifth season of varsity eligibility this season. He played in 10 games and scored 48 points for a 4.8-point-per-game average for the season. Apparently dissatisfied with his academic progress, the university ended his eligibility at the end of the season. His 57-game collegiate career ended with him having scored 436 points in his five years of play, averaging 7.6 points per game over his career.

Guard and team captain Andrew "Andy" Zazzali also received a fifth year of varsity eligibility to play this year. He also played in 10 games and scored 107 points to lead the team in scoring with 10.7 points per game. He had scored 370 points and averaged 6.1 points per game in his 61-game collegiate career.

Senior forward Paul Florence played in nine games and scored 72 points, second-highest on the team, giving him an 8.0 point-per-game average for the season. He had played on the Georgetown football team during the fall of 1922 and got off to a slow start on the basketball team after the conclusion of the football season, but picked up the pace of his scoring as the season wore on and scored a career-high 20 points in his final collegiate game. He left school after the basketball season to play minor-league baseball in the New York Giants organization, having scored 280 points and averaged 8.5 points per game in his 33-game college basketball career.

Flavin, Florence, and Zazzali as a group played in 44 home games before leaving the school after this season without ever losing one, a significant contribution to the 52-game home winning streak.

== Roster ==
Georgetown players did not wear numbers on their jerseys this season. The first numbered jerseys in Georgetown men's basketball history would not appear until the 1933–34 season.

Name	Height	Weight (lbs.)	Position	Class	Hometown	Previous Team(s)
Al Brogan	N/A	N/A	G	So.	Newark, New Jersey, United States	N/A
Paul Byrne	N/A	N/A	G	Sr.	N/A	N/A
George Carney	N/A	N/A	G	Grad. Stud.	N/A	N/A
Jack Flavin	5'11"	175	F	Grad. Stud.	Portland, Maine, United States	Portland HS
Paul Florence	6'1"	178	G	Sr.	Chicago, United States	Loyola Academy
Tom Joyce	N/A	N/A	F	N/A	N/A	N/A
Charley O'Byrne	N/A	N/A	F	N/A	N/A	N/A
John O'Keefe	N/A	N/A	C	So.	N/A	N/A
Richie Ryan	N/A	N/A	F	Fr.	Boston, United States	Boston College HS
Jim Sweeney	N/A	N/A	G	So.	Boston, United States	N/A
Andy Zazzali	N/A	N/A	G	Grad. Stud.	Baltimore, Maryland, United States	Mount St. Joseph HS

== 1922–23 schedule and results ==
It was common practice at this time for colleges and universities to include non-collegiate opponents in their schedules, with the games recognized as part of their official record for the season, so the January 13, 1923, game against a United States Marine Corps team from Marine Corps Base Quantico, Virginia, counted as part of Georgetown's won-loss record for 1922-23. It was not until 1952, after the completion of the 1951-52 season, that the National Collegiate Athletic Association (NCAA) ruled that colleges and universities could no longer count games played against non-collegiate opponents in their annual won-loss records.

Date time, TV	Opponent	Result	Record	Site city, state
Regular Season
Sat., Jan. 13, 1923 no, no	St. Francis (Pa.)	cancelled		Ryan Gymnasium; Washington, D.C.
Sat., Jan. 13, 1923 no, no	Quantico Marines	W 22–17	1-0	Ryan Gymnasium; Washington, D.C.
Fri., Jan. 19, 1923 no, no	Lafayette	W 34–30	2-0	Ryan Gymnasium; Washington, D.C.
Sat., Jan. 20, 1923 no, no	at George Washington	W 39–20	3-0	Central Coliseum; Washington, D.C.
Sat., Jan. 27, 1923 no, no	at Navy	L 33–37	3-1	Dahlgren Hall; Annapolis, Maryland
Thu., Feb. 1, 1923 no, no	at Rochester	W 27–26	4-1	N/A; Rochester, New York
Fri., Feb. 2, 1923 no, no	at Buffalo	L 22–27	4-2	N/A; Buffalo, New York
Sat., Feb. 3, 1923 no, no	at Canisius	L 23–34	4-3	Elmwood Hall; Buffalo, New York
Fri., Feb. 9, 1923 no, no	Lebanon Valley	W 36–19	5-3	Ryan Gymnasium; Washington, D.C.
Sat., Feb. 10, 1923 no, no	South Carolina	W 31–14	6-3	Ryan Gymnasium; Washington, D.C.
Fri., Feb. 16, 1923 no, no	Centenary	cancelled		Ryan Gymnasium; Washington, D.C.
Sat., Feb. 17, 1923 no, no	Carnegie Tech	W 41–25	7-3	Ryan Gymnasium; Washington, D.C.
Mon., Feb. 19, 1923 no, no	St. Joseph's	W 46–25	8-3	Ryan Gymnasium; Washington, D.C.
*Non-conference game. (#) Tournament seedings in parentheses.
