= 1921–22 Indiana State Sycamores men's basketball team =

American college basketball season

1921–22 Indiana State Sycamores men's basketball
- Conference: Independent
- Record: 12–3
- Head coach: Birch Bayh (4th season)
- Home arena: North Hall

The 1921–22 Indiana State Sycamores men's basketball team represented Indiana State University during the 1921–22 NCAA men's basketball season. The head coach was Birch Bayh, coaching the newly christened Sycamores in his fourth season. The team played their home games at North Hall in Terre Haute, Indiana.

== Schedule ==
Date time, TV	Opponent	Result	Record	Site city, state
12/03/1921	ISNS Alumni	W 41–19	1–0	North Hall; Terre Haute, IN
12/10/1921	Oakland City	W 35–21	2–0	North Hall; Terre Haute, IN
1/16/1920	Indiana Law	W 61–14	3–0	North Hall; Terre Haute, IN
12/18/1920	at YMCA Vincennes	L 21–33	3–1	
1/06/1922	at Evansville	W 40–11	4–1	Memorial Coliseum; Evansville, IN
1/10/1922	at Butler	L 24–49	4–2	Indianapolis, IN
1/14/1922	at Rose Polytechnic	W 41–25	5–2	North Hall; Terre Haute, IN
1/19/1922	at YMCA Vincennes	W 25–23	6–2	
1/27/1922	Franklin	W 26–23	7–2	North Hall; Terre Haute, IN
2/02/1922	at Eastern Illinois	W 33–20	8–2	Charleston, IL
2/08/1922	at Rose Polytechnic	W 31–22	9–2	
	ISNS Muncie	W 47–12	10–2	North Hall; Terre Haute, IN
2/18/1922	Eastern Illinois	W 32–15	11–2	North Hall; Terre Haute, IN
2/25/1922	Rose Polytechnic	W 65–18	11–3	North Hall; Terre Haute, IN
	at Ball State	W 31–01	12–3	Muncie, IN
*Non-conference game. (#) Tournament seedings in parentheses.
