= Dan Engler =

American professional wrestling referee

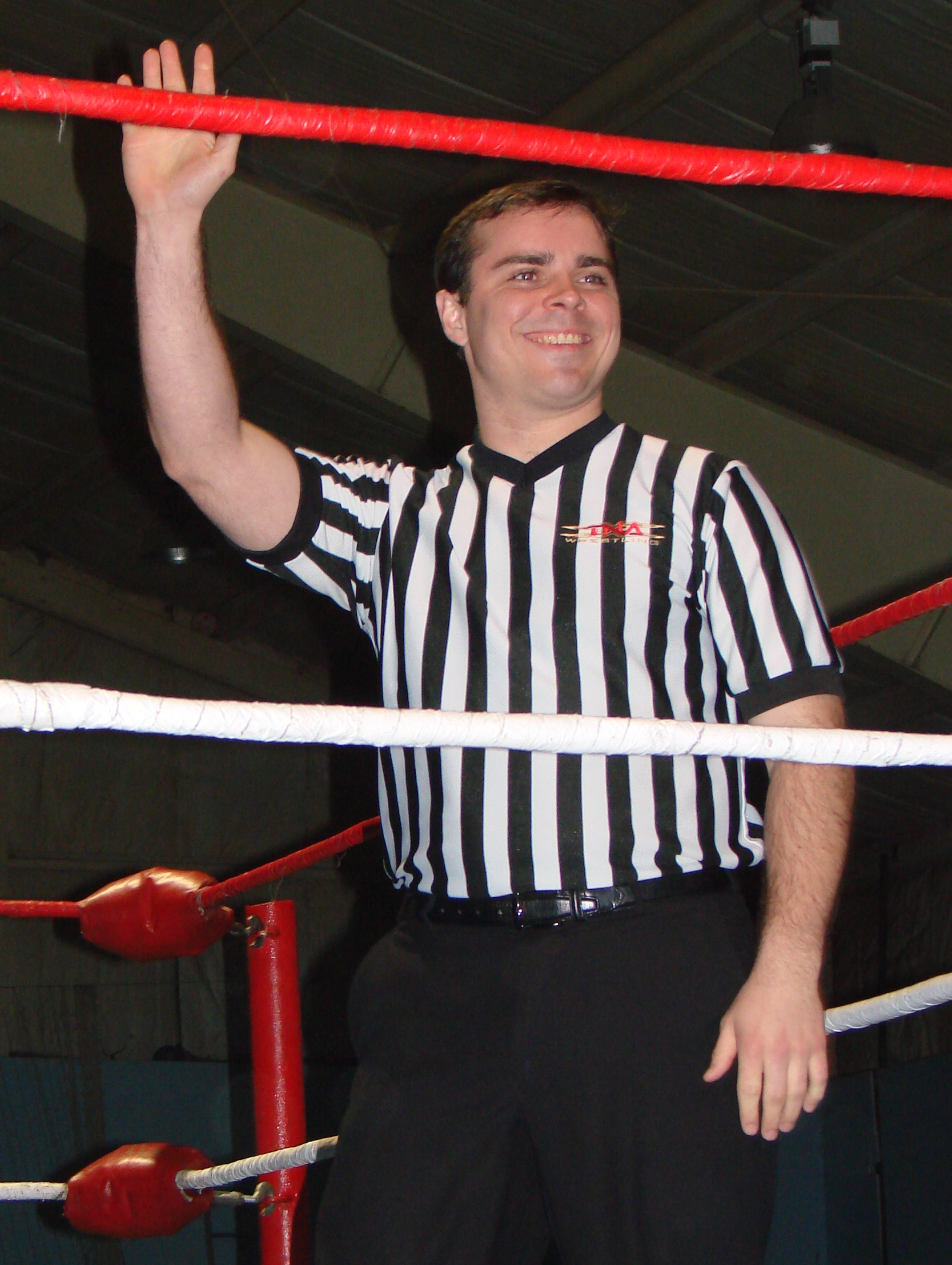
- Engler in 2007

Personal information
- Born: Daniel Engler; November 20, 1977 (age 48) Evansville, Indiana, U.S.
- Spouse: Melissa Boyce (m. 2008)
- Children: 3

Professional wrestling career
- Ring name(s): Rudy Charles; Dan Engler
- Billed height: 5 ft 7 in (170 cm)
- Billed weight: 165 lb (75 kg)
- Trained by: Mark Vance
- Debut: July 6, 1996

Daniel Engler (born November 20, 1977) is an American professional wrestling referee, who is signed to WWE on the SmackDown brand. He is also known for his work in Total Nonstop Action Wrestling (TNA) under the ring name Rudy Charles, where he was the promotion's senior referee.

== Career ==
=== Early career ===
Engler trained as a referee under former United States Wrestling Association referee Mark Vance, whom he met at a wrestling show in the Evansville Soldiers and Sailors Memorial Coliseum, and refereed his first match on July 6, 1996. In 1997, Engler enlisted in the Indiana Army National Guard, and underwent four months of training.

=== Total Nonstop Action Wrestling (2002–2009; 2011) ===
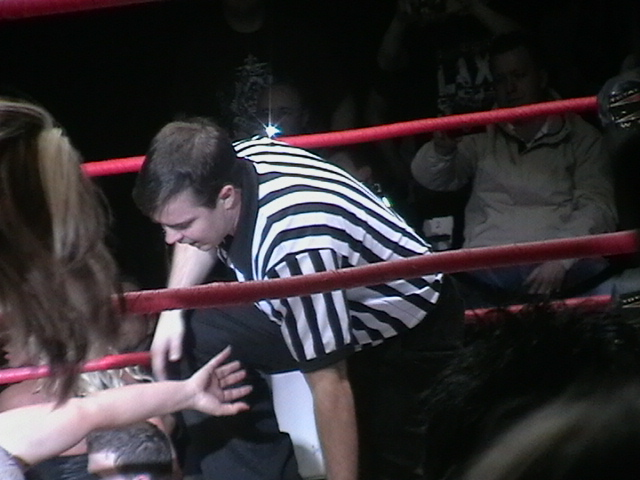
Engler, as Rudy Charles, refereeing for TNA

Engler joined Total Nonstop Action Wrestling (TNA) shortly after its inception in June 2002, and was quickly named senior referee. Known under the ring name Rudy Charles, he was one of the first referees shown on the show, having to help hold Toby Keith back from entering the ring to fight Jeff Jarrett.

On January 29, 2009, Charles made his wrestling debut on TNA Impact!, along with referee Andrew Thomas, in a handicap match against Booker T. In a backstage interview, Charles seemed confident and talked about his amateur wrestling background. Thomas was nervous, but Charles said to follow his lead. This was all short lived as Booker hit Charles with an Axe Kick, finished off Thomas with the Bookend for the pin, and forced Earl Hebner to make the count.

In July 2009, Engler left TNA. However, he again appeared for the promotion on the Thanksgiving Day 2011 episode and featured in several segments alongside wrestler Eric Young, as well as refereeing a match between Young and Robbie E. Despite not appearing since, he refereed in TNA's subsidiary projects Ring Ka King and All Wheels Wrestling.

=== Independent circuit (2009–2013) ===
Engler has run several family oriented wrestling promotions in his hometown of Evansville, Indiana. He has run shows at the historic Soldiers and Sailors Memorial Coliseum (former home to the USWA), the Vanderburgh County 4-H Fairground (home to the Frog Follies classic car festival) and the CK Newsome Center, an urban community center for inner-city children.

On his debut in National Wrestling Alliance Main Event, Shawn Shultz lost his NWA Mid-America Heavyweight Championship. On various episodes, Shultz said that Engler screwed his match. Shultz and his manager, Tony Lucassio, called Engler a reject referee from another promotion in Orlando, noting his time in TNA. Engler made his Ohio Valley Wrestling (OVW) debut as the special guest referee of a match between heel referee Chris Sharpe and OVW senior official Ray Ramsey in December 2009. He then refereed several matches in OVW.

=== WWE (2013–present) ===
In July 2013, Engler indicated on his Twitter account that he had signed with WWE and would be working NXT tapings. He was also present at the WWE Performance Center grand-opening.

On October 27, 2013, working under his real name, Engler made his WWE pay-per-view debut at Hell In A Cell. He refereed the Divas Championship match between AJ Lee and Brie Bella. The following night on Raw, he refereed another Divas match, between Natalya and Summer Rae, in the latter's debut match.

On the March 14, 2016 episode of Raw, Engler was injured after being hit in the leg with a production crate by Triple H during a backstage brawl between him and a returning Roman Reigns. He required 13 stitches and 3 sutures to close the wound. In June 2016, he appeared as one of the seven referees for the Cruiserweight Classic.

On the November 7, 2025 episode of SmackDown, Engler was attack by Drew McIntyre during a match between Cody Rhodes and Aleister Black.

== Other work ==
Engler was the wrestling referee for the season three premiere of Pros vs. Joes.

Engler maintains a YouTube channel; and has a recurring show named The Rudy Charles Talk Show. Some of the guests included: former TNA/WWE referee Mike Posey, wrestlers such as Mike Rapada, Mike Rapada Jr., Steve O, Matt Boyce, and Shawn Shultz.

Sporting positions
Preceded by Scott Armstrong	Total Nonstop Action Wrestling Senior Referee; 2002–2009	Succeeded by Earl Hebner
