= 1920–21 Indiana State Sycamores men's basketball team =

American college basketball season

1920–21 Indiana State Sycamores men's basketball
- Conference: Independent
- Record: 15–7
- Head coach: Birch Bayh (3rd season)
- Home arena: North Hall

The 1920–21 Indiana State Sycamores men's basketball team represented Indiana State University during the 1920–21 college men's basketball season. The head coach was Birch Bayh Sr, coaching the Fightin' Teachers in his third season. The team played their home games at North Hall in Terre Haute, Indiana.

This season marked the second season Indiana State recorded "double-digit" wins and marked the first season they program recorded 15 or more wins.

== Schedule ==
Date time, TV	Opponent	Result	Record	Site city, state
12/04/1920	ISNS Alumni	W 49–19	1–0	North Hall; Terre Haute, IN
12/10/1920	Oakland City	W 51–17	2–0	North Hall; Terre Haute, IN
1/10/1920	Vincennes	W 29–27	3–0	North Hall; Terre Haute, IN
12/18/1920	at Wabash	L 17–28	3–1	Crawfordsville, IN
12/22/1920	at Indiana	L 11–34	3–2	Men's Gymnasium; Bloomington, IN
1/06/1921	at YMCA Vincennes	L 19–31	3–3	Vincennes, IN
1/07/1920	at Evansville College	W 28–14	4–3	Memorial Coliseum; Evansville, IN
1/08/1920	at Oakland City	L 23–24	4–4	
1/14/1921	Eastern Illinois	W 66–10	5–4	North Hall; Terre Haute, IN
1/21/1921	Butler	L 30–41	5–5	Indianapolis, IN
1/22/1921	at Franklin	L 21–27	5–6	Franklin, IN
1/27/1921	Merom Christian	W 56–04	6–6	North Hall; Terre Haute, IN
1/28/1921	Central Normal	W 82–15	7–6	North Hall; Terre Haute, IN
2/01/1921	Eastern Illinois	W 38–32	8–6	North Hall; Terre Haute, IN
2/03/1921	Franklin	W 33–27	9–6	North Hall; Terre Haute, IN
2/05/1921	at Merom Christian	W 26–01	10–6	
2/08/1921	Rose Polytechnic	W 33–17	11–6	North Hall; Terre Haute, IN
2/11/1921	Butler	L 28–32	11–7	North Hall; Terre Haute, IN
2/16/1921	Rose Polytechnic	W 40–12	12–7	North Hall; Terre Haute, IN
2/17/1921	at Eastern Illinois	W 34–18	13–7	Charleston, IL
2/18/1921	Evansville College	W 65–18	14–7	North Hall; Terre Haute, IN
2/26/1921	Rose Polytechnic	W 35–24	15–7	North Hall; Terre Haute, IN
*Non-conference game. (#) Tournament seedings in parentheses.
