= 1922–23 Michigan State Normal Normalites men's basketball team =

American college basketball season

1922–23 Michigan State Normal Normalites men's basketball
- Conference: Michigan Intercollegiate Athletic Association
- Record: 14–8 (6-4 MIAA)
- Head coach: Joseph H. McCulloch (2nd season)
- Assistant coaches: Lee Spencer; Young
- Home arena: Gymnasium

The 1922–23 Michigan State Normal Normalites men's basketball team represented the Michigan State Normal School, now Eastern Michigan University, in the 1922–23 NCAA men's basketball season. The team finished with a record of 14–8. The team was led by second year head coach Joseph H. McCulloch and assistant coach Young, along with manager Lee Spencer. Harold "Hogie" Osborn was the team Captain. Harold Dillon was the leading scorer for the Normalites.

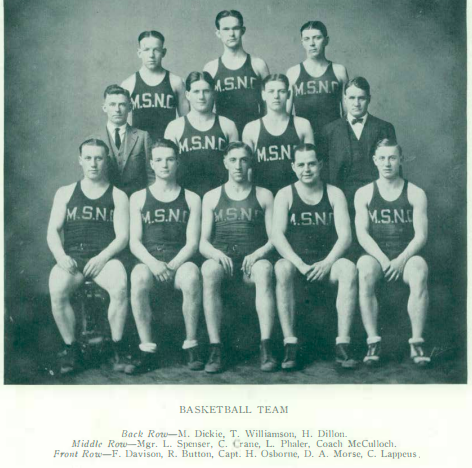
1922-23 EMU Basketball Team Picture

== Roster ==
Number	Name	Position	Class	Hometown
	Harold Osborne	Forward	Senior	Whittaker, MI
	Malcolm Dickie			
	Ted Williamson		Sophomore	Ypsilanti, MI
	Harold C. Dillon		Freshman	Grand Rapids, MI
	Cliff Crane		Graduate Student	Linden, MI
	LeRoy Pfahler			
	Francis Davidson		Sophomore	Pontiac, MI
	Robert Button			
	D.A. Morse			
	Charles Lappeus			
	Grant	Center		
	McRae			

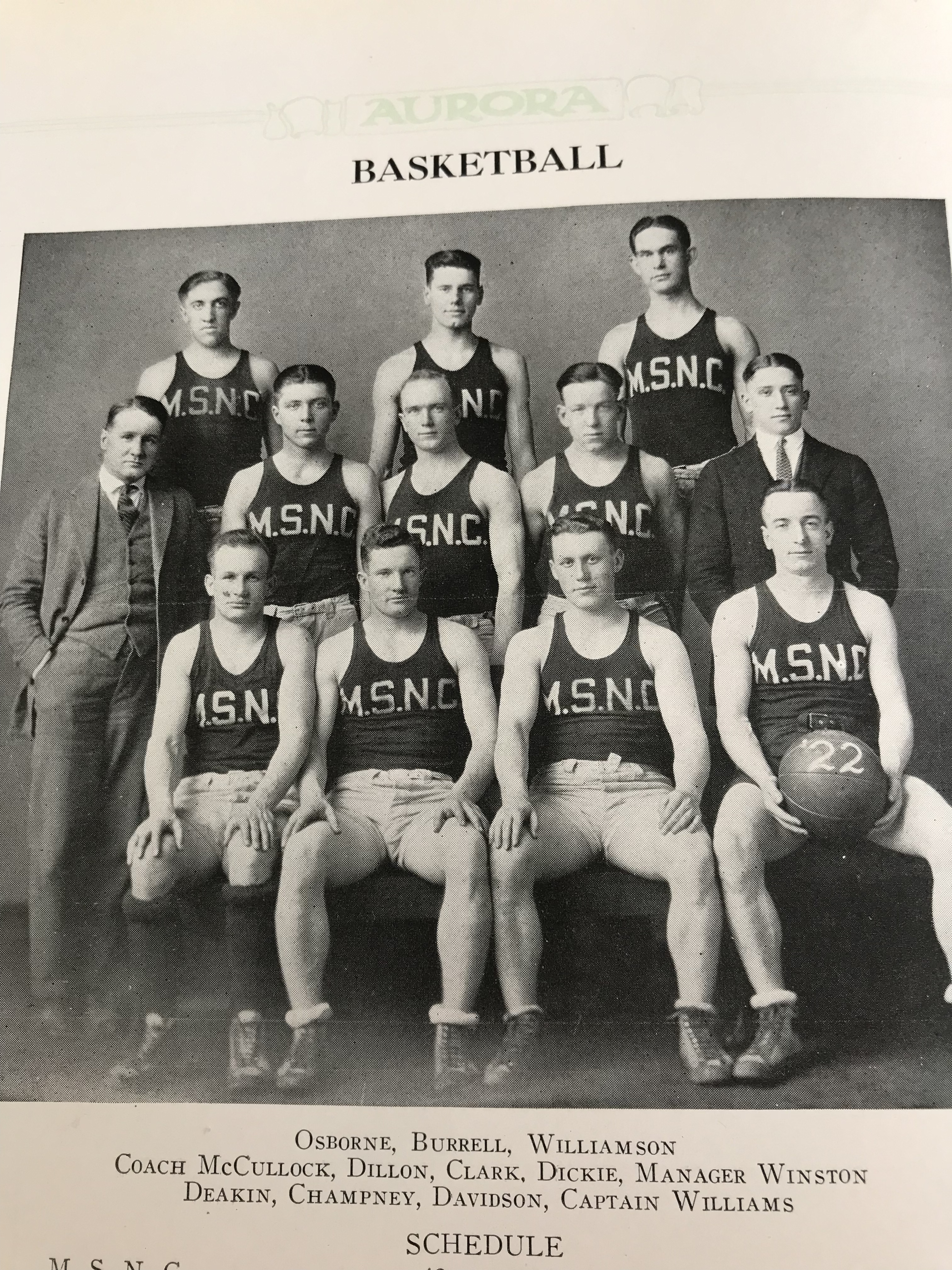
1921-22 Michigan State Normal College Men's Basketball Team

== Schedule ==
Date time, TV	Opponent	Result	Record	Site (attendance) city, state
Non-conference regular season
January 4, 1923*	Alumni	W 46-23	1–0	Gymnasium; Ypsilanti, MI
January 6, 1923*	at Pontiac Junior College	W 39-13	2–0	Pontiac, MI
January 10, 1923*	Ann Arbor YMCA	W 29-21	3–0	Gymnasium; Ypsilanti, MI
January 12, 1923; 7:00	Adrian	W 76-19	4-0 (1-0)	Gymnasium; Ypsilanti, MI
January 13, 1923*	at Michigan State	L 17-19	4–1	College Gymnasium; East Lansing, MI
January 19, 1923	at Alma	W 27-24	5–1 (2-0)	Alma, MI
January 20, 1923*	at Central Michigan	L 15-23	5–2	Central Hall; Mount Pleasant, MI
January 24, 1923*	Pontiac			Gymnasium; Ypsilanti, MI
January 26, 1923	Hillsdale	W 31-18	6–2 (3-0)	Gymnasium; Ypsilanti, MI
January 27, 1923*	at Detroit YMCA	W 19-13	7–2	Detroit, MI
February 3, 1923	Albion	W 36-19	8–2 (4-0)	Gymnasium; Ypsilanti, MI
February 7, 1923*	Detroit YMCA	W 30-28	9–2	Gymnasium; Ypsilanti, MI
February 9, 1923; 7:00	at Kalamazoo	L 29-34	9–3 (4-1)	Kalamazoo, MI
February 10, 1923*	Lake Forest	W 33-20	10–3	Gymnasium; Ypsilanti, MI
February 14, 1923*	Western Michigan	L 21-22	10–4	Gymnasium; Ypsilanti, MI
February 16, 1923	at Albion	W 31-5	11–4 (5-1)	Albion, MI
February 21, 1923*	Wayne State	W 24-20	12–4	Detroit, MI
February 23, 1923; 8:00	Alma	L 25-30	12–5 (5-2)	Gymnasium; Ypsilanti, MI
February 28, 1923	at Hillsdale	L 24-32	12-6 (5-3)	Hillsdale, MI
March 2, 1923	at Adrian	W 76-19	13–6 (6-3)	Adrian, MI
March 3, 1923*; 7:00	Central Michigan	W 29-21	14–6	Gymnasium; Ypsilanti, MI
March 7, 1923	at Kalamazoo	L 19-21	14–7 (6-4)	Kalamazoo, MI
March 1923*	at Western Michigan	L 31-35	14–8	East Hall Gymnasium; Kalamazoo, MI
*Non-conference game. (#) Tournament seedings in parentheses. All times are in Eastern Time.

== Game Notes ==
=== February 9, 1932 ===
Aurora has a score of 29-34.

=== March 23, 1923 ===
Aurora has a score of 25-30.
