= 1922–23 Buffalo Bisons men's basketball team =

American college basketball season

1922–23 Buffalo Bisons men's basketball
- Conference: Independent
- Record: 7–5
- Head coach: Art Powell (8th season)

The 1922–23 Buffalo Bisons men's basketball team represented the University of Buffalo during the 1922–23 NCAA college men's basketball season. The head coach was Art Powell, coaching his eight season with the Bisons.

== Schedule ==
Date time, TV	Opponent	Result	Record	Site city, state
	Mechanics	W 15–11	1–0	Buffalo, NY
	Yale	L 13–23	1–1	Buffalo, NY
	at Hobart	W 32–26	2–1	Geneva, NY
	Niagara	W 19–16	3–1	Buffalo, NY
	at R.P.I.	L 16–38	3–2	Troy, NY
	at Rochester	L 21–33	3–3	Rochester, NY
2/01/1923	Georgetown	W 27–22	4–3	Buffalo, NY
	Rochester	W 35–23	5–3	Buffalo, NY
	at Niagara	L 20–21	5–4	Lewiston, NY
	Hobart	W 39–20	6–4	Buffalo, NY
	Alfred	W 51–23	7–4	Buffalo, NY
	at Alfred	L 30–31	7–5	Alfred, NY
*Non-conference game. (#) Tournament seedings in parentheses.
