= 1922–23 Indiana State Sycamores men's basketball team =

American college basketball season

1922–23 Indiana State Sycamores men's basketball
- Conference: Independent
- Record: 20–5
- Head coach: Birch Bayh (5th season)
- Home arena: North Hall

The 1922–23 Indiana State Sycamores men's basketball team represented Indiana State University during the 1922–23 NCAA men's basketball season. The head coach was Birch Bayh, coaching the Sycamores in his fifth season. The team played their home games at North Hall in Terre Haute, Indiana.

This season marked the Sycamores first "twenty-win" season and their 11th winning season over a twelve-season span.

== Schedule ==
Date time, TV	Opponent	Result	Record	Site city, state
11/18/1922	ISNS Alumni	W 62–25	1–0	North Hall; Terre Haute, IN
11/28/1922	at Indianapolis Dental	W 30–16	2–0	
12/08/1922	at Studebaker of Paris, IL	W 60–13	3–0	
12/12/1922	at Central Normal	W 24–22	4–0	
12/16/1922	at Oakland City	W 33–20	5–0	North Hall; Terre Haute, IN
	at Indiana Law	W 59–07	6–0	North Hall; Terre Haute, IN
12/30/1922	at Merom Christian	W 92–16	7–0	
1/02/1923	Central Normal	W 68–16	8–0	North Hall; Terre Haute
1/06/1923	at Evansville	W 68–26	9–0	Memorial Coliseum; Evansville, IN
1/09/1923	Rose Polytechnic	W 58–12	10–0	North Hall; Terre Haute, IN
1/11/1923	at Franklin	L 19–40	10–1	Franklin, IN
1/18/1923	Indianapolis Dental	W 36–19	11–1	North Hall; Terre Haute, IN
1/19/1923	at Oakland City	W 47–18	12–1	
1/20/1923	Eastern Illinois	W 34–24	13–1	North Hall; Terre Haute, IN
	at Pennsylvania	L 20–22	13–2	North Hall; Terre Haute, IN
1/27/1923	Evansville	W 45–29	14–2	North Hall; Terre Haute, IN
1/30/1923	at Ball State	W 39–29	15–2	Muncie, IN
2/09/1923	at Sparks Bus. Col.	W 37–30	16–2	
2/10/1923	at Concordia-Mo.	L 33–36	16–3	
2/13/1923	at Butler	L 26–38	16–4	Indianapolis, IN
2/14/1923	at Eastern Illinois	W 34–17	17–4	Eastern Illinois; Charleston, IL
2/17/1923	Franklin	L 17–28	17–5	North Hall; Terre Haute, IN
2/20/1923	Merom Christian	W 78–16	18–5	North Hall; Terre Haute, IN
2/24/1923	Ball State	W 65–19	19–5	North Hall; Terre Haute, IN
2/28/1923	Rose Polytechnic	W 39–20	20–5	North Hall; Terre Haute, IN
*Non-conference game. (#) Tournament seedings in parentheses.
