= 1922–23 Illinois Fighting Illini men's basketball team =

American college basketball season

1922–23 Illinois Fighting Illini men's basketball
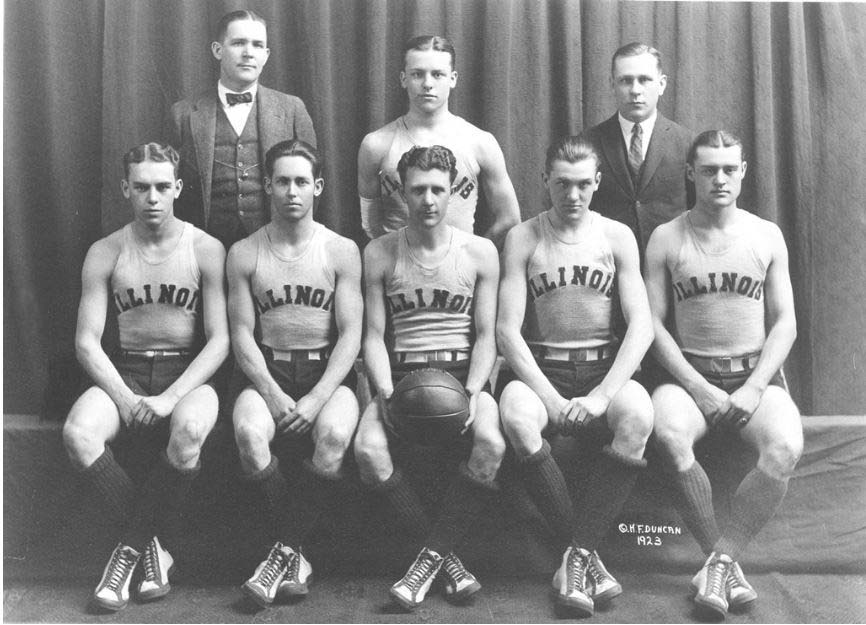
- Conference: Big Ten Conference
- Record: 9–6 (7–5 Big Ten)
- Head coach: J. Craig Ruby (1st season)
- Captain: Norton Hellstrom
- Home arena: Kenney Gym

1922–23 Big Ten Conference men's basketball standings
| | Conf. | | | | Overall |
| Team | W | | L | PCT | W | | L | PCT |
|---|---|---|---|---|---|---|---|---|
| Iowa | 11 | – | 1 | .917 | 13 | – | 2 | .867 |
| Wisconsin | 11 | – | 1 | .917 | 12 | – | 3 | .800 |
| Michigan | 8 | – | 4 | .667 | 11 | – | 4 | .733 |
| Illinois | 7 | – | 5 | .583 | 9 | – | 6 | .600 |
| Purdue | 7 | – | 5 | .583 | 9 | – | 6 | .600 |
| Chicago | 6 | – | 6 | .500 | 6 | – | 9 | .400 |
| Indiana | 5 | – | 7 | .417 | 8 | – | 7 | .533 |
| Northwestern | 3 | – | 9 | .250 | 5 | – | 10 | .333 |
| Ohio State | 1 | – | 11 | .083 | 4 | – | 11 | .267 |
| Minnesota | 1 | – | 11 | .083 | 2 | – | 13 | .133 |

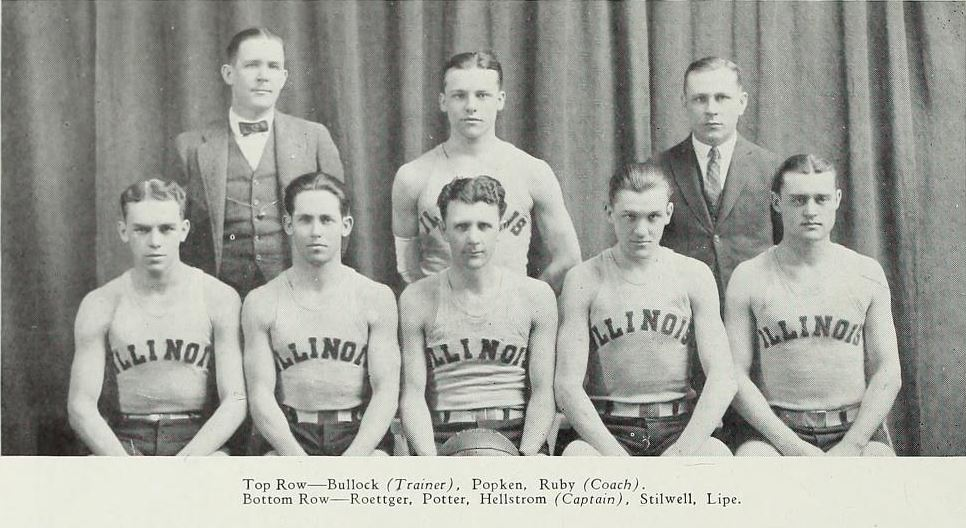
"1922-23 Fighting Illini men's basketball team"

The 1922–23 Illinois Fighting Illini men's basketball team represented the University of Illinois.

== Regular season ==
Craig Ruby, a two-time All-American and All-Missouri Valley Conference forward for the University of Missouri Tigers, came to the University of Illinois after being the head coach of his alma-mater from 1920 to 1922. Compiling a record of 33 wins and only 2 losses at Missouri, Ruby was recruited by University of Illinois athletic director George Huff to take over the Fighting Illini's men's basketball coaching duties. The 1922–23 season, the first of 14 for Ruby, was also the first of twelve winning seasons as head coach. During this season, five of the Illini's six losses were at the hands of Big Ten Conference opponents, placing them in a tie for fourth place. The overall record for this team was nine wins and six losses. The Big Ten record for the season was seven wins and five losses. The starting lineup included captain Norton Hellstrom, Wally Roettger and G.E. Potter at forward, Leland Stillwell at center, and Jack Lipe and R.H. Popken as guards.

=== Roster ===
1922–23 Illinois Fighting Illini men's basketball team
Players
Coaches

| Pos. | # | Name | Height | Weight | Year | Hometown |
|---|---|---|---|---|---|---|
| F | 1 | Norton Hellstrom (C) | — | — | Sr | Evanston, Illinois |
| G | 2 | James Arthur Van Doorn | — | — | So | Quincy, Illinois |
| F | 3 | Wally Roettger | — | — | Jr | St. Louis, Missouri |
| C | 4 | Adelbert C. Baur | — | — | Sr | Chicago, Illinois |
| F | 5 | Glenn E. Potter | — | — | Jr | Orange, California |
| F | 6 | Roland H. Popken | — | — | Jr | Oak Park, Illinois |
| G | 7 | Jack Lipe | — | — | Fr | Decatur, Illinois |
| G | 8 | John Wilbur "Hank" Hansen | — | — | Jr | Brookston, Indiana |
| G | 9 | Cecil F. Hollopeter | — | — | So | Spencerville, Indiana |
| G | 10 | George Dawson | — | — | Jr | Wheaton, Illinois |
| F | 11 | Charles Milton White | — | — | Jr | Chicago, Illinois |
| F | 12 | Philip S. Durant | — | — | Sr | Wheaton, Illinois |
| C | 13 | Leland "Slim" Stillwell | — | — | Jr | Olney, Illinois |
| G | 14 | John C. Happenny | — | — | So | Revere, Massachusetts |
| G | 15 | James Knox Jones | — | — | Sr | Wayne, Nebraska |
| F | 16 | Don Karnes | — | — | So | Fairbury, Illinois |
| F | 17 | Wallace Wesley McIlwain | — | — | So | Highland Park, Illinois |
| F | 18 | Curtis R. Parker | — | — | So | Fort Wayne, Indiana |
| C | 19 | Emil G. Schultz | — | — | So | Geneseo, Illinois |
| G | 20 | Theron Leroy "Pat" Stoik | — | — | So | Clinton, Iowa |
| F | 21 | George Albert Walker | — | — | So | Danville, Illinois |
| F | 22 | Harold Everett Wessman | — | — | Jr | Rockford, Illinois |
| F | 23 | Joseph Fred Winkler | — | — | Jr | Chicago, Illinois |

Head coach

- Craig Ruby (University of Missouri) (1st year)

Assistant coach(es)

Legend

- (C) Team captain
- (S) Suspended
- (I) Ineligible
- (W) Walk-on
- Injured
- Current redshirt

Roster

== Schedule ==
| Date time, TV | Rank^{#} | Opponent^{#} | Result | Record | Site (attendance) city, state |
Non-Conference regular season
| 12/16/1922* | | Washington University | W 29–14 | 1-0 | Kenney Gym (4,630); Urbana, IL |
| 12/21/1922* | | Notre Dame | W 41–38 | 2-0 | Kenney Gym (-); Urbana, IL |
| 12/22/1922* | | Butler | L 25–29 | 2-1 | Kenney Gym (-); Urbana, IL |
Big Ten regular season
| 1/8/1923 | | at Ohio State | W 36–31 | 3-1 (1-0) | Ohio Expo Center Coliseum (-); Columbus, OH |
| 1/13/1923 | | Indiana; Rivalry | W 31–22 | 4-1 (2-0) | Kenney Gym (3,794); Urbana, IL |
| 1/16/1923 | | at Michigan | L 13–30 | 4-2 (2-1) | Waterman Gymnasium (-); Ann Arbor, MI |
| 1/20/1923 | | Purdue | L 20–24 | 4-3 (2-2) | Kenney Gym (-); Urbana, IL |
| 2/2/1923 | | at Minnesota | W 24–21 | 5-3 (3-2) | University of Minnesota Armory (-); Minneapolis, MN |
| 2/7/1923 | | University of Chicago | W 20–18 | 6-3 (4-2) | Kenney Gym (-); Urbana, IL |
| 2/12/1923 | | at Indiana; Rivalry | L 24–31 | 6-4 (4-3) | Men's Gymnasium (-); Bloomington, IN |
| 2/17/1923 | | at Purdue | W 28–26 | 7-4 (5-3) | Memorial Gymnasium (-); West Lafayette, IN |
| 2/19/1923 | | Minnesota | W 25–18 | 8-4 (6-3) | Kenney Gym (-); Urbana, IL |
| 2/24/1924 | | at University of Chicago | L 20–24 | 8-5 (6-4) | Bartlett Gymnasium (-); Chicago, IL |
| 2/26/1923 | | Michigan | L 20–27 | 8-6 (6-5) | Kenney Gym (-); Urbana, IL |
| 3/5/1923 | | Ohio State | W 37–21 | 9-6 (7-5) | Kenney Gym (-); Urbana, IL |
*Non-conference game. ^{#}Rankings from AP Poll. (#) Tournament seedings in parentheses. All times are in Central Time.
