= 1922–23 Army Cadets men's basketball team =

American college basketball season

1922–23 Army Cadets men's basketball
- Conference: Independent
- Record: 17–0
- Head coach: Harry A. Fisher (2nd season)
- Captain: Maurice Daniel

The 1922–23 Army Cadets men's basketball team represented the United States Military Academy (known as "Army" for their sports teams) during the 1922–23 intercollegiate basketball season in the United States. The team finished the season with a 17–0 record and was retroactively listed as the top team of the season by the Premo-Porretta Power Poll. It was head coach Harry A. Fisher's second season coaching the team.
