= Jackie Maloney =

American football and basketball coach (1896–1971)

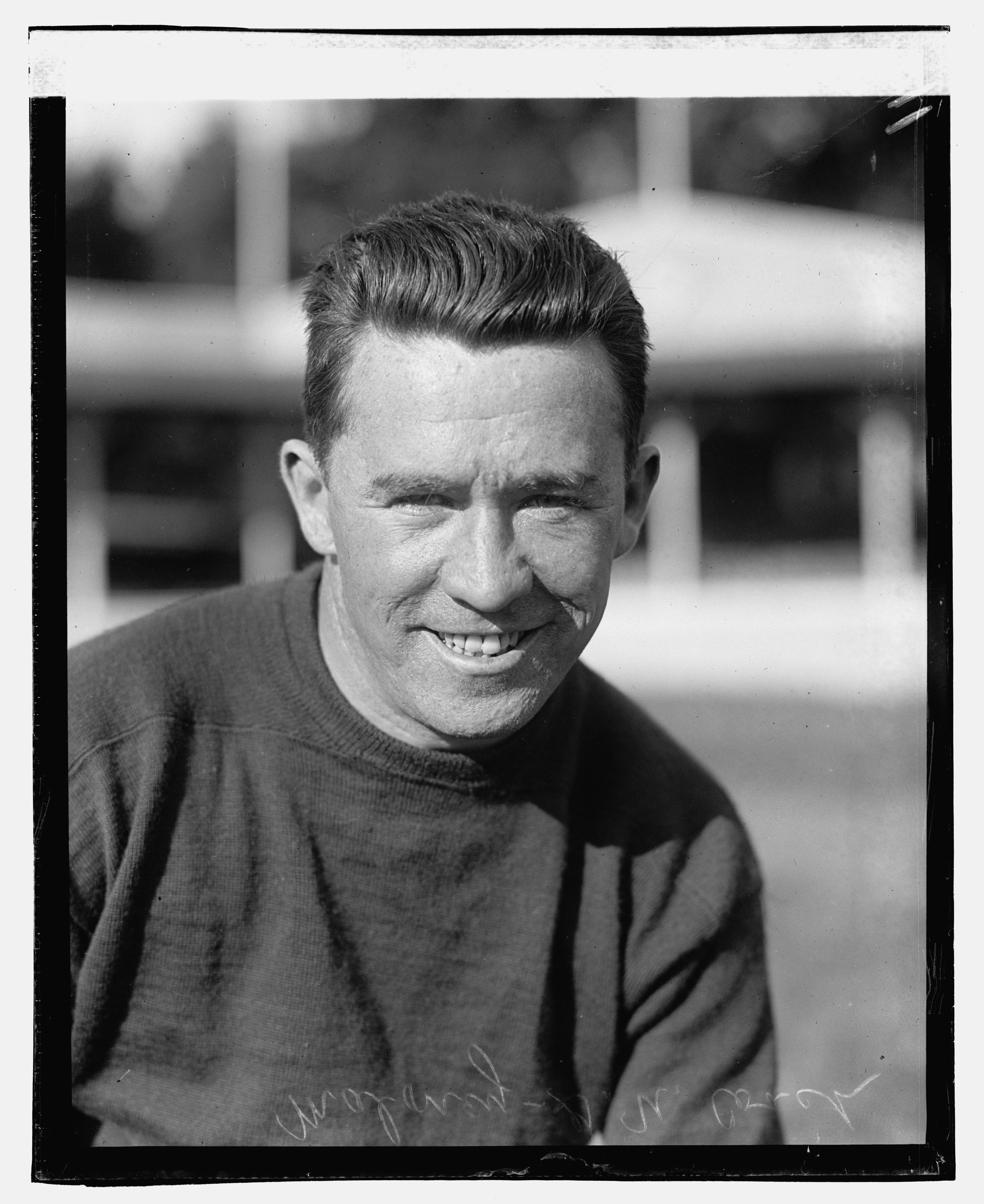

Biographical details
- Born: 1896
- Died: 1971 (aged 74–75)

Playing career

Football
- 1917: Georgetown
- Position: Quarterback

Coaching career (HC unless noted)

Football
- 1921–1922: Georgetown (assistant)
- 1923: Georgetown

Basketball
- 1922–1923: Georgetown

Head coaching record
- Overall: 3–6 (football); 8–3 (basketball)

John Maloney (1896–1971) was an American college football and college basketball coach. He served as the head football coach at Georgetown University in 1923, compiling a record of 3–6. After coaching the school′s freshman basketball team, he also served as its head varsity basketball coach during the 1922–23 season after John O'Reilly, the Georgetown varsity basketball coach from 1914 to 1921, was unable to coach due to illness for a second straight season. During his single season as the varsity basketball coach before O'Reilly returned, Maloney tallied a mark of 8–3.

== Head coaching record ==
=== Football ===
Year	Team	Overall	Conference	Standing	Bowl/playoffs
Georgetown Blue and Gray (Independent) (1923)
1923	Georgetown	3–6			
Georgetown:		3–6			
Total:		3–6			

=== Basketball ===
Record table
Season	Team	Overall	Conference	Standing	Postseason
Georgetown Hoyas (Independent) (1922–1923)
1922–23	Georgetown	8–3			
Georgetown:		8–3			
Total:		8–3			
