= 1922–23 Trinity Blue Devils men's basketball team =

American college basketball season

1922–23 Trinity Blue Devils men's basketball
- Conference: Independent
- Record: 15–7
- Head coach: Jesse Burbage (1st season)
- Captain: James Simpson
- Home arena: The Ark

The 1922–23 Trinity Blue Devils men's basketball team represented Trinity College (later renamed Duke University) during the 1922–23 men's college basketball season. The head coach was Jesse Burbage, coaching his first season with the Blue Devils. The team finished with an overall record of 15–7.

== Schedule ==
Date time, TV	Opponent	Result	Record	Site city, state
*	Camp Bragg	L 26–28	0–1	The Ark; Durham, NC
*	Winston-Salem YMCA	W 49–26	1–1	The Ark; Durham, NC
*	Durham YMCA	L 17–25	1–2	The Ark; Durham, NC
*	Camp Bragg	W 30–21	2–2	The Ark; Durham, NC
*	Statesville	W 28–26	3–2	The Ark; Durham, NC
*	at Lynchburg Elks	W 35–27	4–2	
*	Durham YMCA	L 33–37	4–3	The Ark; Durham, NC
*	Newberry	W 40–33	5–3	The Ark; Durham, NC
*	Lenoir	W 49–20	6–3	The Ark; Durham, NC
*	Wake Forest	L 18–30	6–4	The Ark; Durham, NC
*	Davidson	W 39–27	7–4	The Ark; Durham, NC
*	Lynchburg	W 36–33	8–4	The Ark; Durham, NC
*	Virginia	L 25–28	8–5	The Ark; Durham, NC
*	Richmond	W 30–22	9–5	The Ark; Durham, NC
*	Virginia Tech	W 34–33	10–5	The Ark; Durham, NC
*	Virginia	W 37–24	11–5	The Ark; Durham, NC
*	N.C. State	W 32–27	12–5	The Ark; Durham, NC
*	Wake Forest	W 36–26	13–5	The Ark; Durham, NC
*	Guilford	W 45–32	14–5	The Ark; Durham, NC
*	N.C. State	W 31–20	15–5	The Ark; Durham, NC
2/3/1923*	North Carolina	L 19–20	15–6	The Ark; Durham, NC
2/17/1923*	at North Carolina	L 32–35	15–7	Chapel Hill, NC
*Non-conference game. (#) Tournament seedings in parentheses.
