= 1922–23 William & Mary Indians men's basketball team =

American college basketball season

1922–23 William & Mary Indians men's basketball
- Conference: Independent
- Record: 8–4
- Head coach: James G. Driver (4th season)

The 1922–23 William & Mary Indians men's basketball team represented the College of William & Mary in intercollegiate basketball during the 1922–23 season. Under the fourth, and final, year of head coach James G. Driver (who concurrently served as the head baseball coach), the team finished the season with an 8–4 record. This was the 18th season of the collegiate basketball program at William & Mary, whose nickname is now the Tribe.

== Schedule ==
Date time, TV	Rank^{#}	Opponent^{#}	Result	Record	Site city, state
Regular season
*		Wake Forest	L 33–38	0–1	Williamsburg, VA
*		Richmond Blues	W 24–10	1–1	Williamsburg, VA
*		at Randolph–Macon	W 29–11	2–1	Ashland, VA
*		at Virginia	L 19–35	2–2	Charlottesville, VA
1/27/1923*		at Richmond	L 15–31	2–3	Millhiser Gymnasium; Richmond, VA
*		Fort Eustis	W 34–20	3–3	Williamsburg, VA
*		Newport News Shipyard	L 34–41	3–4	Williamsburg, VA
*		Hampden–Sydney	W 43–11	4–4	Williamsburg, VA
*		George Washington	W 26–21	5–4	Williamsburg, VA
*		Lenoir–Rhyne	W 49–19	6–4	Williamsburg, VA
*		Randolph–Macon	W 39–17	7–4	Williamsburg, VA
2/24/1923*		Richmond	W 32–22	8–4	Williamsburg, VA
*Non-conference game. ^{#}Rankings from AP Poll. (#) Tournament seedings in parentheses.
