= 1922–23 Indiana Hoosiers men's basketball team =

American college basketball season

1922–23 Indiana Hoosiers men's basketball
- Conference: Big Ten Conference
- Record: 8–7 (5–7 Big Ten)
- Head coach: Leslie Mann (1st season)
- Captain: Wilfred Bahr
- Home arena: Men's Gymnasium

1922–23 Big Ten Conference men's basketball standings
	Conf.				Overall
Team	W		L	PCT	W		L	PCT
Iowa	11	–	1	.917	13	–	2	.867
Wisconsin	11	–	1	.917	12	–	3	.800
Michigan	8	–	4	.667	11	–	4	.733
Illinois	7	–	5	.583	9	–	6	.600
Purdue	7	–	5	.583	9	–	6	.600
Chicago	6	–	6	.500	6	–	9	.400
Indiana	5	–	7	.417	8	–	7	.533
Northwestern	3	–	9	.250	5	–	10	.333
Ohio State	1	–	11	.083	4	–	11	.267
Minnesota	1	–	11	.083	2	–	13	.133

The 1922–23 Indiana Hoosiers men's basketball team represented Indiana University. Their head coach was Leslie Mann, who was in his first year. The team played its home games at the Men's Gymnasium in Bloomington, Indiana, and was a member of the Big Ten Conference.

The Hoosiers finished the regular season with an overall record of 8–7 and a conference record of 5–7, finishing 7th in the Big Ten Conference.

== Roster ==
Name	Position	Year	Hometown
Relle Aldridge	F	Sr.	Lyons, Indiana
Ken Alward	G	So.	South Bend, Indiana
Wilfred Bahr	F	Jr.	Evansville, Indiana
Harry Champ	F	Jr.	Rochester, Indiana
George Coffey	F	So.	Bloomington, Indiana
Lawrence Crane	F	N/A	Indianapolis, Indiana
William Crowe	G	Jr.	Bedford, Indiana
Elder Eberhardt	G	Jr.	Evansville, Indiana
Stephen Harvey	C	So.	Zionsville, Indiana
Earl Knoy	G	So.	Martinsville, Indiana
Michael Nyikos	F	So.	South Bend, Indiana
Paul Parker	C	So.	Kokomo, Indiana
Harold Sanford	F	Jr.	Lebanon, Indiana
Eugene Thomas	G	Sr.	Fortville, Indiana
Richard Woodward	F	Jr.	Lapel, Indiana
Harry Yoars	G	N/A	Amboy, Indiana

== Schedule/results ==
Date time, TV	Rank^{#}	Opponent^{#}	Result	Record	Site city, state
Regular season
12/7/1922*		Indiana Dental College	W 28–12	1–0	Men's Gymnasium; Bloomington, IN
12/15/1922*		Franklin College	W 36–18	2–0	Men's Gymnasium; Bloomington, IN
1/8/1923		Wisconsin	L 10–17	2–1 (0–1)	Men's Gymnasium; Bloomington, IN
1/13/1923		at Illinois; Rivalry	L 22–31	2–2 (0–2)	Kenney Gym; Urbana, IL
1/31/1923		at Purdue; Rivalry	W 31–26	3–2 (1–2)	Memorial Gymnasium; West Lafayette, IN
2/7/1923*		Notre Dame	W 33–18	4–2 (1–2)	Men's Gymnasium; Bloomington, IN
2/12/1923		Illinois; Rivalry	W 31–24	5–2 (2–2)	Men's Gymnasium; Bloomington, IN
2/17/1923		Minnesota	W 33–20	6–2 (3–2)	Men's Gymnasium; Bloomington, IN
2/20/1923		at Northwestern	L 26–30	6–3 (3–3)	Old Patten Gymnasium; Evanston, IL
2/22/1923		at Iowa	L 13–19	6–4 (3–4)	Iowa Armory; Iowa City, IA
3/3/1923		Northwestern	W 31–25	7–4 (4–4)	Men's Gymnasium; Bloomington, IN
3/5/1923		Iowa	W 23–21	8–4 (5–4)	Men's Gymnasium; Bloomington, IN
3/10/1923		at Minnesota	L 25–29	8–5 (5–5)	UM Armory; Minneapolis, MN
3/12/1923		at Wisconsin	L 17–35	8–6 (5–6)	Red Gym; Madison, WI
3/15/1923		Purdue; Rivalry	L 29–31	8–7 (5–7)	Men's Gymnasium; Bloomington, IN
*Non-conference game. ^{#}Rankings from AP Poll. (#) Tournament seedings in parentheses.
