= 1922–23 Wisconsin Badgers men's basketball team =

American college basketball season

1922–23 Wisconsin Badgers men's basketball

Big Ten Conference Co–Champions
- Conference: Big Ten Conference
- Record: 12–3 (11–1 Big Ten)
- Head coach: Walter Meanwell
- Home arena: Red Gym

1922–23 Big Ten Conference men's basketball standings
	Conf.				Overall
Team	W		L	PCT	W		L	PCT
Iowa	11	–	1	.917	13	–	2	.867
Wisconsin	11	–	1	.917	12	–	3	.800
Michigan	8	–	4	.667	11	–	4	.733
Illinois	7	–	5	.583	9	–	6	.600
Purdue	7	–	5	.583	9	–	6	.600
Chicago	6	–	6	.500	6	–	9	.400
Indiana	5	–	7	.417	8	–	7	.533
Northwestern	3	–	9	.250	5	–	10	.333
Ohio State	1	–	11	.083	4	–	11	.267
Minnesota	1	–	11	.083	2	–	13	.133

The 1922–23 Wisconsin Badgers men's basketball team represented University of Wisconsin–Madison. The head coach was Walter Meanwell, coaching his ninth season with the Badgers. The team played their home games at the Red Gym in Madison, Wisconsin and was a member of the Big Ten Conference.

== Schedule ==
Date time, TV	Rank^{#}	Opponent^{#}	Result	Record	Site city, state
Regular Season
12/15/1922*		Butler	L 13–20	0–1	Red Gym; Madison, WI
12/19/1922*		Lombard (IL)	W 37–9	1–1	Red Gym; Madison, WI
1/03/1923*		Marquette	L 8–9	1–2	Red Gym; Madison, WI
1/06/1923		at Northwestern	W 21–10	2–2 (1–0)	Patten Gymnasium; Evanston, IL
1/08/1923		at Indiana	W 17–10	3–2 (2–0)	Men's Gymnasium; Bloomington, IN
1/13/1923		Chicago	W 24–11	4–2 (3–0)	Red Gym; Madison, WI
1/20/1923		at Minnesota	W 24–12	5–2 (4–0)	Minnesota Armory; Minneapolis, MN
2/06/1923		at Purdue	L 13–17	5–3 (4–1)	Memorial Gymnasium; West Lafayette, IN
2/14/1923		at Michigan	W 18–15	6–3 (5–1)	Waterman Gymnasium; Ann Arbor, MI
2/19/1923		Michigan	W 16–11	7–3 (6–1)	Red Gym; Madison, WI
2/24/1923		Purdue	W 20–19	8–3 (7–1)	Red Gym; Madison, WI
3/03/1923		Minnesota	W 36–10	9–3 (8–1)	Red Gym; Madison, WI
3/05/1923		Northwestern	W 29–17	10–3 (9–1)	Red Gym; Madison, WI
3/10/1923		at Chicago	W 33–11	11–3 (10–1)	Bartlett Gymnasium; Chicago, IL
3/12/1923		Indiana	W 35–17	12–3 (11–1)	Red Gym; Madison, WI
*Non-conference game. ^{#}Rankings from AP Poll. (#) Tournament seedings in parentheses.
