= Harry A. Fisher =

American college basketball coach

Harry Fisher
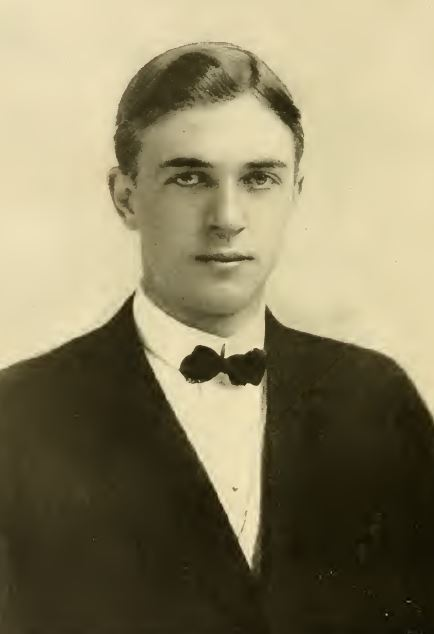
- Fisher from the 1905 Spalding Official Collegiate Basketball Guide

Personal information
- Born: February 6, 1882 New York City, New York, U.S.
- Died: December 29, 1967 (aged 85) New York City, New York, U.S.
- Listed height: 5 ft 9 in (1.75 m)
- Listed weight: 150 lb (68 kg)

Career information
- High school: City College (New York City, New York)
- College: Columbia (1902–1905)
- Position: Guard

Career history

Coaching
- 1904–1905: Fordham
- 1906–1907: Army
- 1906–1916: Columbia
- 1909–1910: St. John's
- 1921–1923: Army
- 1924–1925: Army

Career highlights
- As player: 2× Helms national champion (1904, 1905); Consensus All-American (1905); As coach: Helms national champion (1910); 3× EIBL champion (1911, 1912, 1914); Helms Hall of Fame (1945)
- Basketball Hall of Fame
- Collegiate Basketball Hall of Fame

Harold A. Fisher (February 6, 1882 – December 29, 1967) was an American college basketball coach from New York City, New York.

In 1905, while a student and player at Columbia University, Fisher began coaching the basketball team of Fordham University, leading the team to a 4–2 record while capturing All-American honors as a player and leading Columbia to its second straight national championship.

In 1906, Fisher assumed the head coaching duties at Columbia, where he would remain for ten years, during which times his teams amassed a record of 101–39 and won three Eastern Intercollegiate Basketball League titles; in 1909 and 1910, Fisher simultaneously coached Columbia and St. John's University, helping the latter to a 15–5 record during his tenure.

In recognition of his work at Columbia, Fisher was commissioned by General Douglas MacArthur to coach the basketball team at United States Military Academy after World War I. He assumed the job in 1921 and coached three seasons at the school, leaving with a record of 46–5. His 1922–23 team finished the season with a 17–0 record and was retroactively listed as the top team of the season by the Premo-Porretta Power Poll.

For his work in developing the game of basketball, first as a member of a four-person committee that wrote the first rules for collegiate basketball and the editor of the resulting "Collegiate Rules Committee and Collegiate Guide" (1905–1915), and later as athletic director at Columbia (1911–1917), Fisher was inducted as a contributor into the Basketball Hall of Fame in 1974.
