= 1922–23 Niagara Purple Eagles men's basketball team =

American college basketball season

1922–23 Niagara Purple Eagles men's basketball
- Conference: Independent
- Record: 13–5
- Head coach: John Blake (3rd season)

The 1922–23 Niagara Purple Eagles men's basketball team represented Niagara University during the 1922–23 NCAA college men's basketball season. The head coach was John Blake, coaching his third season with the Purple Eagles.

== Schedule ==
Date time, TV	Opponent	Result	Record	Site city, state
	Mechanical Inst.	W 56–08	1–0	Lewiston, NY
	Albany Law	W 26–18	2–0	Lewiston, NY
	Hobart	W 27–16	3–0	Lewiston, NY
1/11/1923	at Villanova	L 12–44	3–1	Villanova, PA
	Crescent A.C.	W 28–24	4–1	Lewiston, NY
	Rochester Opt.	W 47–24	5–1	Lewiston, NY
	Detroit	W 40–16	6–1	Lewiston, NY
	Thiel	W 34–16	7–1	Lewiston, NY
2/21/1923	Canisius	W 40–22	8–1	Lewisburg, NY
	Clarkson Tech	W 30–16	9–1	Lewiston, NY
	Kenilworths	W 34–14	10–1	Lewiston, NY
	St. John's	W 34–16	11–1	Lewiston, NY
	Allegheny	W 28–17	12–1	Lewiston, NY
	Detroit	L 23–37	12–2	Lewiston, NY
	Hobart	L 30–38	12–3	Lewiston, NY
	Buffalo	L 16–19	12–4	Lewiston, NY
	Buffalo	W 21–20	13–4	Lewiston, NY
	R.P.I.	L 21–44	13–5	Lewiston, NY
*Non-conference game. (#) Tournament seedings in parentheses.
