= Birch Bayh (coach) =

American baseball and basketball coach

Biographical details
- Born: September 29, 1893; Quincy, Indiana, U.S.
- Died: August 26, 1971 (aged 77); Bethesda, Maryland, U.S.

Playing career

Basketball
- 1915–1917: Indiana State

Coaching career (HC unless noted)

Basketball
- 1918–1923: Indiana State

Baseball
- 1919–1923: Indiana State

Administrative career (AD unless noted)
- 1915–1923: Indiana State

Head coaching record
- Overall: 57–24 (.704) (basketball); 42–13 (.764) (baseball)

Birch Evans Bayh Sr. (September 29, 1893 – August 26, 1971) was an American basketball and baseball coach. He was the head basketball coach at Indiana State University from 1918 to 1923. During this time, he also served as the head baseball coach, athletic director and professor of physical education. He was also instrumental in the establishment of the Indiana Intercollegiate Conference; additionally, he served as the first secretary-treasurer of that organization.

== Life and career ==
Bayh was born in Quincy, Indiana, the son of Mettie/Nettie (née Evans) and Frederick C. "Fred" Bayh. His paternal grandparents were German immigrants.

Bayh led the Sycamores to their first fifteen-win season and their first twenty-win season. Bayh's .640 winning percentage at Indiana State currently ranks him as the sixth-winningest coach in the school's history.

He began his career as a teacher and coach in the public schools of Owen and Clay counties of Indiana; he later became director of physical education of the Terre Haute, Indiana, public school system and later held the same position for the Washington, D.C., public school system. He was a long-time high school basketball official in Indiana and officiated ten state championship games, a record that he still holds today.

He was a World War I veteran, reaching the rank of Major and held an exercise certificate (an associate degree) from the North American Gymnastics Union of Indianapolis.

A second-generation alumnus of Indiana State, he was the father of U.S. Senator Birch Bayh and Mary Alice Feather, and the grandfather of Governor of Indiana and U.S. Senator Evan Bayh and Christopher Bayh. In 2009, Indiana State renamed its School of Education the "Bayh School of Education" to honor the Bayh family.

== Head coaching record ==
=== Basketball ===
Record table
Season	Team	Overall	Conference	Standing	Postseason
Indiana State Sycamores (Independent) (1918–1923)
1918–19	Indiana State	6–3			
1919–20	Indiana State	4–6			
1920–21	Indiana State	15–7			
1921–22	Indiana State	12–3			
1922–23	Indiana State	20–5			
Indiana State:		57–24			
Total:		57–24			

=== Baseball ===
Record table
Season	Team	Overall	Conference	Standing	Postseason
Indiana State Sycamores (Indiana Collegiate Athletic League) (1919–1922)
1919	Indiana State	11–4		1st	
1920	Indiana State	7–0		1st	
1921	Indiana State	8–4			
1922	Indiana State	7–3			
Indiana State Sycamores (Indiana Intercollegiate Conference) (1923)
1923	Indiana State	9–2–1		1st	
Indiana State:		42–13–1			
Total:		42–13–1			
National champion Postseason invitational champion Conference regular season champion Conference regular season and conference tournament champion Division regular season champion Division regular season and conference tournament champion Conference tournament champion
