= 1922–23 Loyola Ramblers men's basketball team =

American college basketball season

1922–23 Loyola Ramblers men's basketball
- Conference: Independent
- Record: 5–7
- Head coach: Jack Tierney (1st season)
- Home arena: none

The 1922–23 Loyola Ramblers men's basketball team represented Loyola University Chicago during the 1922–23 college men's basketball season. The ramblers were led by first-year head coach Jack Tierney. The team had finished the season with an overall record of 5–7.

== Schedule ==
| Date time, TV | Opponent | Result | Record | Site city, state |
|---|---|---|---|---|
| * | Wheaton | L 12–14 | 0–1 | Chicago, IL |
| * | Lewis | W 20–7 | 1–1 | Chicago, IL |
| * | Valparaiso | L 12–23 | 1–2 | Chicago, IL |
| * | St. Joseph's | L 13–30 | 1–3 | Chicago, IL |
| * | Detroit | L 15–30 | 1–4 | Chicago, IL |
| * | St. Joseph's | W 22–12 | 2–4 | Chicago, IL |
| * | Valparaiso | L 23–36 | 2–5 | Chicago, IL |
| * | DePaul | W 18–15 | 3–5 | Chicago, IL |
| * | Wheaton | W 11–04 | 4–5 | Chicago, IL |
| * | DePaul | L 9–16 | 4–6 | Chicago, IL |
| * | Detroit | L 16–18 | 4–7 | Chicago, IL |
| * | Notre Dame (Frosh) | W 26–18 | 5–7 | Chicago, IL |
*Non-conference game. (#) Tournament seedings in parentheses.
