= 1922–23 Kent State Silver Foxes men's basketball team =

American college basketball season

1922–23 Kent State Silver Foxes men's basketball
- Conference: Independent
- Record: 4–6
- Head coach: Paul G. Chandler (4th season)
- Home arena: Kent Congregational Gymnasium

The 1922–23 Kent State Silver Foxes men's basketball team was the men's basketball team at what is now Kent State University in Kent, Ohio, then known as Kent State Normal College.

The men's basketball team played eight games in late 1922 and early 1923, finishing with a record of 1–7. It was the fourth and last year for coach Paul G. Chandler.

The nickname Silver Foxes was beginning to be adopted as the nickname for teams for the college, and Blue and Gold had replaced the original Orange and Blue as the school colors. The roster comprised L.E. Hardy, Howard Evans, Theodore Huge, Glenn Francis, Miller, Pasqual Carlozzi, Benjamin Schroeder and Horace Gooch. All practice sessions and home games were held in the gymnasium of the Kent Congregational Church.

== Schedule and results ==
Date time, TV	Opponent	Result	Record	Site city, state
*	at Ashland	L 18–24	0–1	Ashland, OH
*	Dayton	L 11–26	0–2	
*	Baldwin-Wallace	L 15–32	0-3	
*	Spencerian	W 22–18	1-3	
*	Davey Institute	W 23–13	2–3	Kent, OH
*	at Spencerian	L 17–21	2–4	Cleveland, OH
*	at Hiram	L 10–48	2–5	Hiram, OH
*	Davey Institute	W 30–20	3–5	Kent, OH
*	Akron	L 25–48	3–6	Kent, OH
*	John Marshall Law	W 35–12	4–6	
*Non-conference game. (#) Tournament seedings in parentheses. Source

== See also ==
- List of Kent State Golden Flashes men's basketball seasons
