= 1922–23 Michigan Wolverines men's basketball team =

American college basketball season

1922–23 Michigan Wolverines men's basketball
- Conference: Big Ten Conference
- Record: 11–4 (8–4 Big Ten)
- Head coach: E. J. Mather
- Captain: Gilbert C. Ely
- Home arena: Waterman Gymnasium

1922–23 Big Ten Conference men's basketball standings
	Conf.				Overall
Team	W		L	PCT	W		L	PCT
Iowa	11	–	1	.917	13	–	2	.867
Wisconsin	11	–	1	.917	12	–	3	.800
Michigan	8	–	4	.667	11	–	4	.733
Illinois	7	–	5	.583	9	–	6	.600
Purdue	7	–	5	.583	9	–	6	.600
Chicago	6	–	6	.500	6	–	9	.400
Indiana	5	–	7	.417	8	–	7	.533
Northwestern	3	–	9	.250	5	–	10	.333
Ohio State	1	–	11	.083	4	–	11	.267
Minnesota	1	–	11	.083	2	–	13	.133

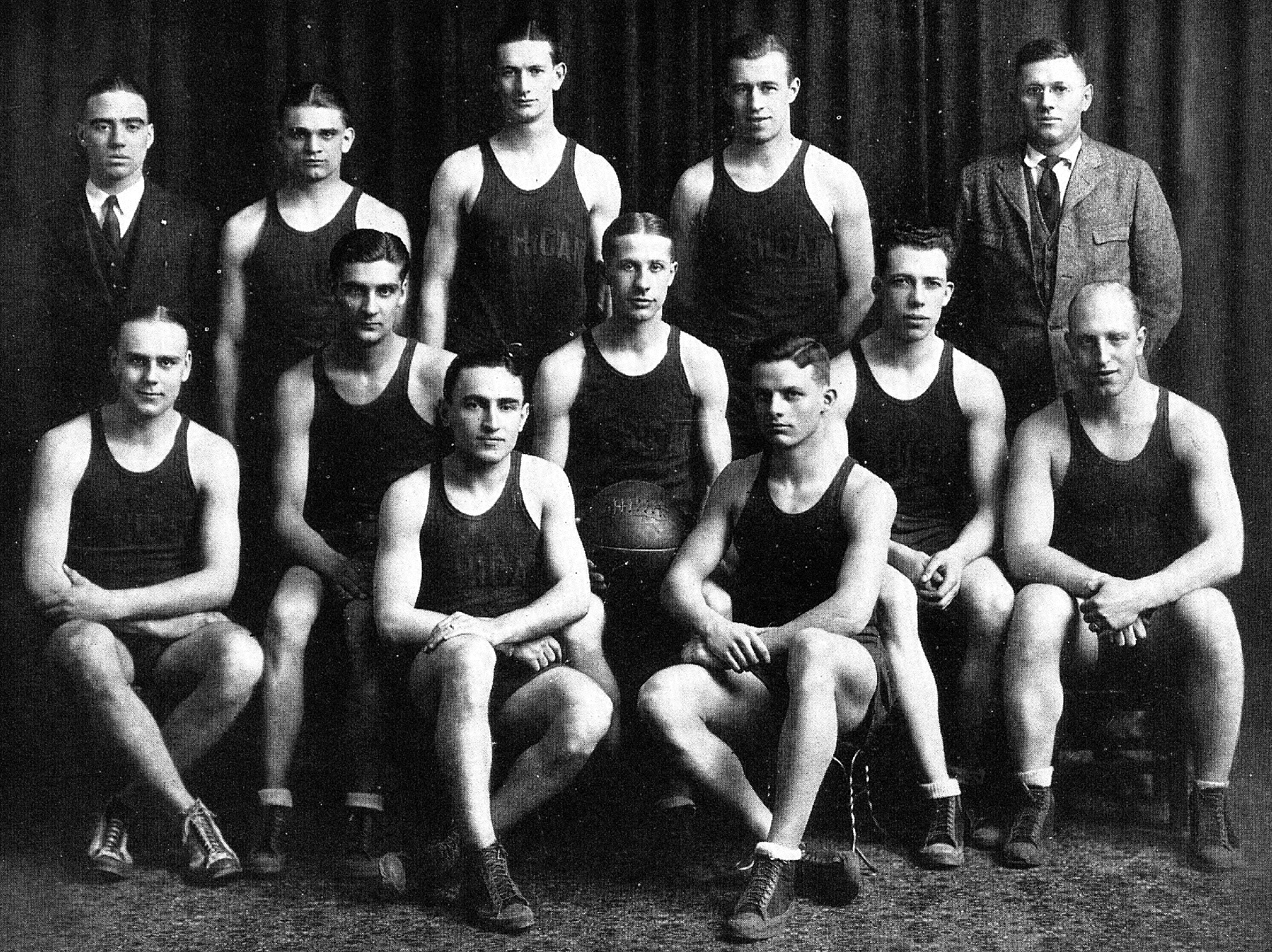
1922–23 Michigan Wolverines men's basketball team Back (from left): Bert Uebele, Harry Kipke, Arthur McWood, William Henderson, E. J. Mather Middle (from left): Howard Birks, William Rice, Gilbert Ely, William Piper, Franklin Cappon Front (from left): Meyer Paper, George Haggerty

The 1922–23 Michigan Wolverines men's basketball team represented the University of Michigan in intercollegiate basketball during the 1922–23 season. The team compiled a record of 11–4, and 8–4 against Big Ten Conference opponents. The team finished in third place in the Big Ten behind Iowa and Wisconsin. E. J. Mather was in his fourth year as the team's coach, and Gilbert C. Ely was the team captain as well as being the team's high scorer and a unanimous first-team All-Big Ten player. Michigan played only three non-conference games during the 1922–23 season, one against Notre Dame and a home-and-away series against Michigan Agricultural College (now known as Michigan State University).

In early February 1923, the team lost its best forwards, Bill Miller and George Haggerty. Miller, who had been the leading scorer on the 1921–22 team, was declared academically ineligible after receiving two "cons" in his classes. Miller was the second leading scorer in the Big ten at the time when he was ruled ineligible. Haggerty was lost to illness. The team had a record of 7–1 when it lost the services of Miller and Haggerty.

== Schedule ==
- December 8: Michigan 41, Notre Dame 23, at Ann Arbor. Bill Miller scored 28 points for Michigan.
- January 3: Michigan 33, Michigan Agricultural College 11.
- January 6: Michigan 33, Illinois 13, at Ann Arbor.
- January 13: Michigan 32, Minnesota 11, at Minneapolis. Michigan had led 18-2 at halftime.
- January 15: Iowa 18, Michigan 17, at Iowa.
- January __: Michigan 29, Michigan Agricultural 13, at East Lansing.
- January 22: Michigan 16, Northwestern 10, at Ann Arbor.
- January 27: Michigan 49, Ohio State 25. Bill Miller was the high scorer for Michigan, scoring more points than the entire Ohio State team.
- February 12: Michigan 34, Minnesota 18.
- February 14: Wisconsin 18, Michigan 15, at Ann Arbor.
- February 17: Michigan 27, Northwestern 13. With Miller out of the lineup, Ely took over as Michigan's leading scorer. He scored 19 points against Northwestern.
- February 19: Wisconsin 16, Michigan 11.
- February 22: Michigan 39, Ohio State 14. Ely scored 24 points for Michigan.
- February 26: Michigan 27, Illinois 20.
- March 3: Iowa 20, Michigan 18, at Ann Arbor. The game was the season finale, and Iowa came into the game undefeated. The game attracted "the largest crowd that ever saw a basketball game at Michigan" up to that time. Michigan led, 10-9, at halftime, but Iowa's defense held Michigan to eight points in the second half.

== Players ==
- Jack P. Beukema, Grand Rapids, Michigan - aMa letter winner
- Howard M. "Hoppy" Birks, Chicago, Illinois - guard and varsity letter winner
- Franklin "Cappie" Cappon, Holland, Michigan - guard and varsity letter winner
- Gilbert C. "Gil" Ely, Waldron, Michigan - center and varsity letter winner
- Charles Emery, Beford, Indiana -
- George Haggarty, Ypsilanti, Michigan - forward and varsity letter winner
- William P. "Bill" Henderson, Detroit, Michigan - forward and varsity letter winner
- Harry Kipke, Lansing, Michigan - forward and varsity letter winner
- Carl C. Kresbach, Monroe, Michigan - aMa letter winner
- Joseph M. Landre, Binghamton, New York - aMa letter winner
- Hugh A. MacGregor, Ann Arbor, Michigan - aMa letter winner
- George W. "Bill" Miller, Oxford, Indiana - played in Michigan's games through the end of January 1923 before being declared academically ineligible
- Arthur B. "Bus" McWood - center and varsity letter winner
- Meyer "Mike" Paper, St. Paul, Minnesota - guard and varsity letter winner
- William J. "Bill" Piper, Calumet, Michigan - forward and varsity letter winner
- William J. "Bill" Rice, Archbold, Ohio - center and varsity letter winner (took over at center when Haggerty became ill)
- Irwin Stegmeier, Grand Rapids, Michigan - aMa letter winner

== Coaching staff ==
- E. J. Mather - coach
- Bert E. Uebele - manager
- Fielding H. Yost - athletic director
