= 1926–27 Georgetown Hoyas men's basketball team =

American college basketball season

1926–27 Georgetown Hoyas men's basketball
- Conference: Independent
- Record: 5–4
- Head coach: John O'Reilly (11th season)
- Captain: Walter Hickey
- Home arena: Ryan Gymnasium

The 1926–27 Georgetown Hoyas men's basketball team represented Georgetown University during the 1926–27 NCAA college basketball season. John O'Reilly coached it in his 11th and last season as head coach. Georgetown was an independent and played its home games at Ryan Gymnasium on the Georgetown campus in Washington, D.C. It finished the season with a record of 5–4.

== Season recap ==
During the mid-1920s, the Georgetown men's basketball program was struggling to survive. Faculty members opposed players missing classes for road games. Furthermore, on-campus Ryan Gymnasium, where the Hoyas had played their home games since the 1914–15 season, had no seating, accommodating fans on a standing-room only-basis on an indoor track above the court. This precluded the accommodation of significant crowds, providing the self-sustaining Basketball Association with little revenue with which to fund the team's travel expenses and limiting Georgetown to a very limited road schedule between the 1918–19 season and this season – often limited to an annual trip to Annapolis, Maryland, to play at Navy and sometimes a single trip to New York or Pennsylvania to play schools there – averaging no more than three road games a year in order to keep travel expenses and missed classes to a minimum. The 1926–27 team played only nine games; its only road game was a visit to Annapolis to play Navy and its planned three-game road trip to New York City at the end of the season was cancelled. It had a winning season in its limited schedule, opening 4–0, then losing four straight, and winning its final game to finish at 5–4.

Junior forward Bob Nork had emerged as a top scorer previous season, and he starred again this year. He played in all nine games, playing a major role in almost all of them, and scored 85 points – almost twice as many as the team's second-leading scorer – averaging 9.4 points per game.

Head coach John O'Reilly retired after this season, having coached Georgetown men's basketball for eleven of the past thirteen seasons. He had posted an overall record of 87–47 and had overseen many of the team's early triumphs, including a 52–0 record at home in Ryan Gymnasium from the last game of the 1916–17 season to the middle of the 1923–24 season that saw the defeat of top-rated visitors such as North Carolina (twice), Georgia Tech, and Kentucky, as well as 15 of the 19 consecutive Georgetown victories over crosstown rival George Washington between 1915 and 1924. He had simultaneously served as head coach of Georgetown's baseball and track teams, and he remained with the school to coach these teams until 1931.

Although the team would continue to use Ryan Gymnasmium as a practice facility, this season was its last as the Hoyas' home court. When new head coach Elmer Ripley took charge the following season, Georgetown Athletic Director Lou Little allowed him to schedule home games off campus for the first time since the 1913–14 season in order to generate greater revenue to pay for travel expenses. The Hoyas would play their home games off campus for 22 seasons until the opening of McDonough Arena for the 1951–52 season brought home games back to campus.

== Roster ==
Georgetown players did not wear numbers on their jerseys this season. The first numbered jerseys in Georgetown men's basketball history would not appear until the 1933–34 season.

| Name | Height | Weight (lbs.) | Position | Class | Hometown | Previous Team(s) |
|---|---|---|---|---|---|---|
| Norbert Berry | N/A | N/A | F | N/A | Milwaukee, WI, U.S. | Marquette University HS |
| Johnny Byrnes | N/A | N/A | G | So. | Short Hills, NJ, U.S. | Xavier HS |
| Joe DiLeo | N/A | N/A | G | So. | N/A | N/A |
| George Donovan | N/A | N/A | G | Jr. | Springfield, MA, U.S. | Dean HS |
| Don Flavin | N/A | N/A | F | Sr. | Portland, ME, U.S. | Portland HS |
| Thomas Glenn | N/A | N/A | G | Jr. | Seattle, WA, U.S. | N/A |
| Joe Griffin | 5'8" | N/A | G | N/A | Chicago, IL, U.S. | Loyola Academy |
| Walter Hickey | N/A | N/A | G | Sr. | Rochester, NY, U.S. | Aquinas Institute |
| J. Nevins McBride | N/A | N/A | F | So. | Paterson, NJ, U.S. | St. Peter's Preparatory School |
| Don McCann | N/A | N/A | G | So. or Sr. | South Portland, ME, U.S. | Portland HS |
| John (or Robert); Mountain | N/A | N/A | C | Sr. | Middletown, CT, U.S. | Middletown HS |
| Bob Nork | N/A | N/A | F | Jr. | Shenandoah, PA, U.S. | Shenandoah HS |
| Frank Odlum | 6'0" | N/A | F | N/A | Unionville, CT, U.S. | Farmington HS |
| John Tomaini | N/A | N/A | C | Sr. | N/A | N/A |

== 1926–27 schedule and results ==
It was common practice at this time for colleges and universities to include non-collegiate opponents in their schedules, with the games recognized as part of their official record for the season, so had the cancelled game against the Crescent Athletic Club been played, it would have counted as part of Georgetown's won-loss record for 1926-27. It was not until 1952, after the completion of the 1951-52 season, that the National Collegiate Athletic Association (NCAA) ruled that colleges and universities could no longer count games played against non-collegiate opponents in their annual won-loss records.

Georgetown's defeat at Navy this season was its 15th straight loss to the Midshipmen. The Hoyas finally would break the losing streak the following season, when they would beat Navy for the first time since 1909.

| Date time, TV | Opponent | Result | Record | Site city, state |
Regular Season
| Thu., Jan. 13, 1927 no, no | Lynchburg | W 24–18 | 1-0 | Ryan Gymnasium; Washington, DC |
| Sat., Jan. 15, 1927 no, no | Mount St. Mary's | W 27–21 | 2-0 | Ryan Gymnasium; Washington, DC |
| Fri., Jan. 21, 1927 no, no | Lebanon Valley | W 36–30 | 3-0 | Ryan Gymnasium; Washington, DC |
| Sat., Jan. 22, 1927 no, no | St. Joseph's | W 17–14 | 4-0 | Ryan Gymnasium; Washington, DC |
| Sat., Jan. 29, 1927 no, no | at Navy | L 17–31 | 4-1 | Dahlgren Hall; Annapolis, MD |
| Tue., Feb. 1, 1927 no, no | Fordham | L 12–30 | 4-2 | Ryan Gymnasium; Washington, DC |
| Thu., Feb. 3, 1927 no, no | Davis & Elkins | L 35–37 ^{OT} | 4-3 | Ryan Gymnasium; Washington, DC |
| Fri., Feb. 4, 1927 no, no | New York University | L 37–38 | 4-4 | Ryan Gymnasium; Washington, DC |
| Thu., Feb. 17, 1927 no, no | William & Mary | W 40-17 | 5-4 | Ryan Gymnasium; Washington, DC |
| Sun., Feb. 20, 1927 no, no | at Crescent Athletic Club | cancelled | | N/A; New York, NY |
| Mon., Feb. 21, 1927 no, no | at St. John's | cancelled | | N/A; New York, NY |
| Tue., Feb. 22, 1927 no, no | at Fordham | cancelled | | N/A; New York, NY |
*Non-conference game. (#) Tournament seedings in parentheses.
