= 1923–24 Georgetown Hoyas men's basketball team =

American college basketball season

1923–24 Georgetown Hoyas men's basketball
- Conference: Independent
- Record: 6–3
- Head coach: John O'Reilly (8th season)
- Captain: George Carney
- Home arena: Ryan Gymnasium

The 1923–24 Georgetown Hoyas men's basketball team represented Georgetown University during the 1923–24 NCAA college basketball season. John O'Reilly coached it in his eighth season as head coach. Georgetown was an independent and played its home games at Ryan Gymnasium on the Georgetown campus in Washington, D.C. It finished with a record of 6–3.

== Season recap ==
O'Reilly, who had coached Georgetown for seven seasons from 1914–15 to 1920–21 with an overall record of 65-30 during those years, had missed the last two seasons due to illness. He returned this season for an eighth year coaching the team, which finished with a record of 6–3. O'Reilly would go on to coach another three seasons at Georgetown before retiring after the completion of the 1926–27 season.

During this era, faculty members opposed players missing classes for road games. Furthermore, on-campus Ryan Gymnasium, where the Hoyas had played their home games since the 1914–15 season, had no seating, accommodating fans on a standing-room only-basis on an indoor track above the court. This precluded the accommodation of significant crowds, providing the self-sustaining Basketball Association with little revenue with which to fund the team's travel expenses and limiting Georgetown to a very limited road schedule between the 1918–19 and 1926–27 seasons – often only to an annual trip to Annapolis, Maryland, to play at Navy and sometimes a single trip to New York or Pennsylvania to play schools there – averaging no more than three road games a year in order to keep travel expenses and missed classes to a minimum. The 1923–24 squad did not even make a New York or Pennsylvania trip; other than a journey across town to play at George Washington, it traveled only to Annapolis to play Navy during the season. One of its scheduled games was cancelled, and it played only nine games.

Georgetown defeated crosstown rival George Washington twice this season, culminating in a one-sided 54-8 win at Ryan Gymnasium, Georgetown's 12th straight win there against George Washington dating back to 1915. The wins gave the Hoyas a 19-game winning streak against George Washington, also dating back to 1915 and leading George Washington so suspend the series for 15 years; the two teams would not meet again until 1939.

A loss to Carson-Newman College on February 2, 1924, finally brought to an end a 52-game home winning streak at Ryan Gymnasium for the Hoyas dating back to a victory against Bucknell on the last day of the 1916–17 season. The streak had included notable victories over top-rated teams such as Georgia Tech, Kentucky, and North Carolina.

== Roster ==
Georgetown players did not wear numbers on their jerseys this season. The first numbered jerseys in Georgetown men's basketball history would not appear until the 1933–34 season.

Sophomore forward Frank "Hap" Farley went on to become a powerful New Jersey politician, serving in the New Jersey Assembly from 1937 to 1940 and as a state senator from 1940 to 1971. He replaced Enoch "Nucky" Johnson as the de facto "boss" of the Republican Party political machine that ran Atlantic City and Atlantic County, New Jersey, from the early 1940s to the early 1970s.

Name	Height	Weight (lbs.)	Position	Class	Hometown	Previous Team(s)
Al Brogan	N/A	N/A	G	Jr.	Newark, NJ, U.S.	N/A
George Carney	N/A	N/A	G	Grad. Stud.	N/A	N/A
Johnny Egan	N/A	N/A	G	Fr.	N/A	N/A
Frank "Hap" Farley	N/A	N/A	F	So.	Atlantic City, New Jersey, U.S.	Wenonah Military Academy
Mike Frederici	N/A	N/A	F	So.	N/A	N/A
Joe McNaney	N/A	N/A	F	Fr.	N/A	N/A
John O'Keefe	N/A	N/A	C	Jr.	N/A	N/A
Jim Sweeney	N/A	N/A	G	Jr.	Boston, MA, U.S.	N/A

== 1923–24 schedule and results ==
Date time, TV	Opponent	Result	Record	Site city, state
Regular Season
Fri., Jan. 11, 1924 no, no	St. Joseph's	W 25–22	1-0	Ryan Gymnasium; Washington, DC
Fri., Jan. 18, 1924 no, no	Lafayette	W 29–12	2-0	Ryan Gymnasium; Washington, DC
Sat., Jan. 19, 1924 no, no	at George Washington	W 21–17	3-0	Central Coliseum; Washington, DC
Thu., Jan. 24, 1924 no, no	at Navy	L 13–44	3-1	Dahlgren Hall; Annapolis, MD
Fri., Feb. 1, 1924 no, no	Bucknell	cancelled		Ryan Gymnasium; Washington, DC
Sat., Feb. 2, 1924 no, no	Carson-Newman	L 28–32	3-2	Ryan Gymnasium; Washington, DC
Fri., Feb. 8, 1924 no, no	George Washington	W 54–8	4-2	Ryan Gymnasium; Washington, DC
Sat., Feb. 9, 1924 no, no	Lebanon Valley	W 33–20	5-2	Ryan Gymnasium; Washington, DC
Thu., Feb. 14, 1924 no, no	Princeton	L 26–35	5-3	Ryan Gymnasium; Washington, DC
Fri., Feb. 15, 1924 no, no	Davis & Elkins	W forfeit	6-3	Ryan Gymnasium; Washington, DC
*Non-conference game. (#) Tournament seedings in parentheses.
