= Soldiers and Sailors Memorial Coliseum =

Arena in Indiana, United States

- The Coliseum
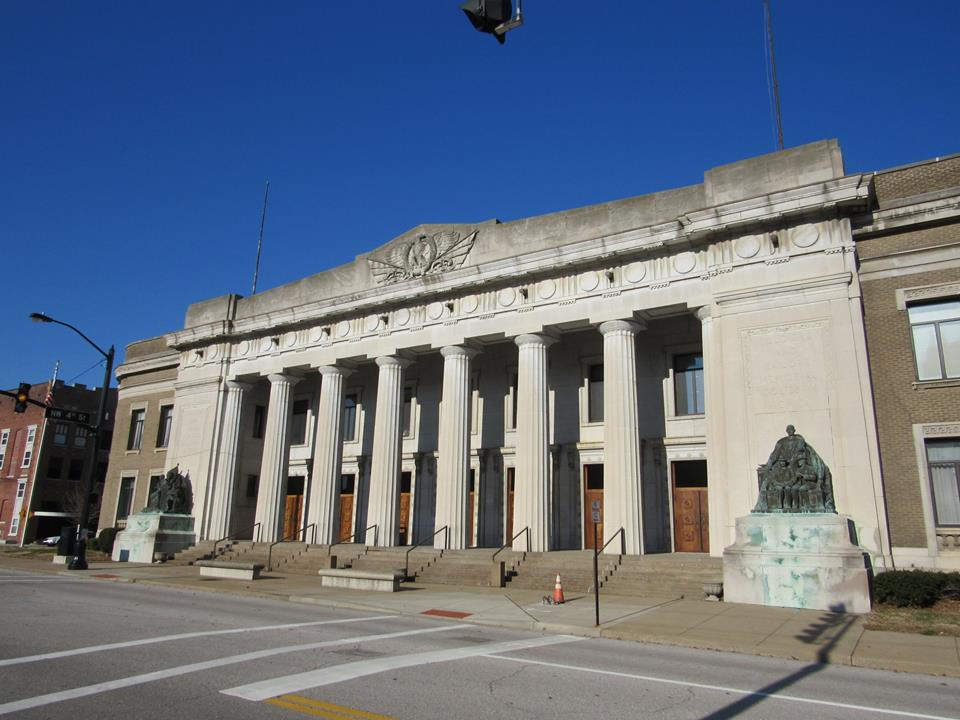
- Interactive map of Soldiers and Sailors Memorial Coliseum
- Location: Evansville, Indiana
- Owner: Vanderburgh County
- Operator: Vanderburgh County Veterans Council
- Capacity: 2,400 (seated); 4,055 (with standing room)
- Public transit: METS

Construction
- Opened: 1916
- Cost: $180,000 (1916)

Tenants
- Dynamite Dolls (WFTDA) (2007- Present), Destruction Dames (WFTDA) (2008- Present)

- Soldiers and Sailors Memorial Coliseum
- U.S. National Register of Historic Places
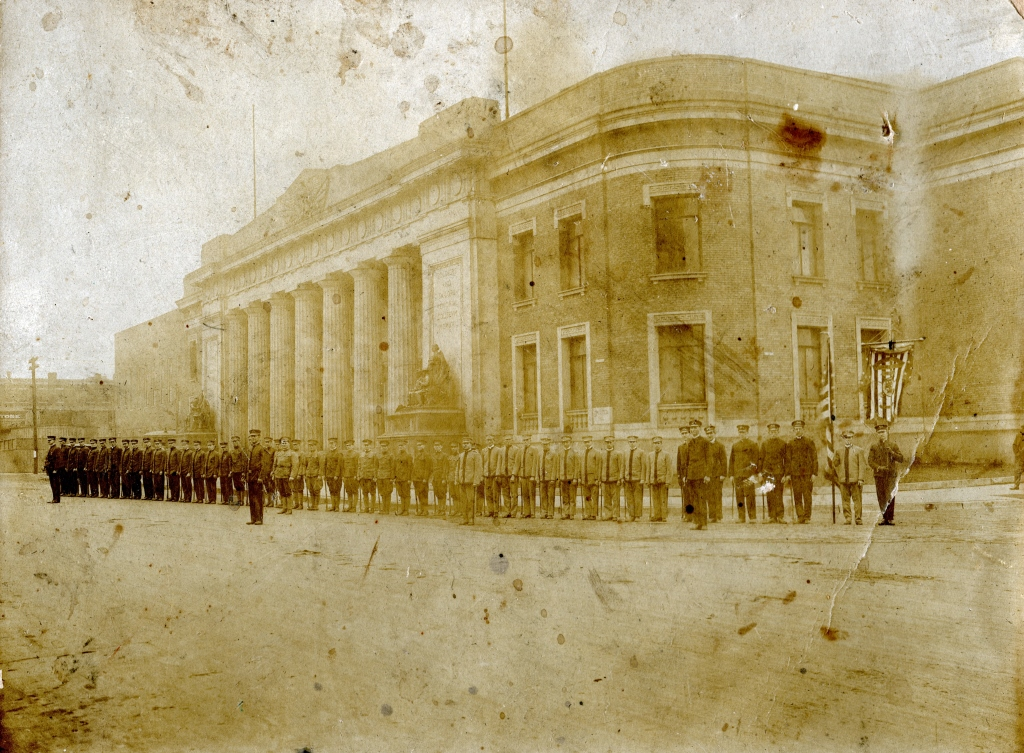
- 1918 photo of the Soldiers and Sailors Memorial Coliseum
- Location: 350 Court St., Evansville, Indiana
- Coordinates: 37°58′27″N 87°34′24″W
- Area: less than one acre
- Built: 1916
- Architect: Shopbell, Clifford & Co.
- NRHP reference No.: 79000052
- Added to NRHP: May 10, 1979

The Soldiers and Sailors Memorial Coliseum (a.k.a. Veterans Memorial Coliseum, The Coliseum, Evansville Coliseum) is a multi-purpose auditorium and meeting space in downtown Evansville, Indiana.

== History ==
The Coliseum was erected as a tribute to the men of Vanderburgh County who fought in the American Civil War and Spanish–American War. After several old buildings were torn down, the cornerstone of the 66,000-square-foot facility was laid May 9, 1916. Construction concluded in March 1917 and the Coliseum was formally dedicated April 18, 1917, right around the time the United States was joining World War I. The original construction cost $180,000.

The neoclassical coliseum was designed by Shopbell & Company and provided the community with its first modern facility for conventions and other public gatherings. The ceremonial aspect of the building was heightened by placing the structure directly on an axis with Fourth Street. Rockport native George H. Honig created two heroic monuments that flank the entrance. The Spirit of 1865, on the left, represents victory for the Union. The Spirit of 1916, on the right, shows the reflective elderly veterans of the Civil War.

Once considered the premier location for events in Evansville, the Coliseum was seen as dated and small when Roberts Municipal Stadium was built in the mid-1950s. When a push for "urban renewal" involving demolitions occurred in the city, the Coliseum was threatened. A "Save the Coliseum" campaign was developed and the same organization that helped save the Old Vanderburgh County Courthouse stepped in and saved the Coliseum from demolition.

In 1919, a 4,000 pipe concert organ was installed as a memorial to Prof. Milton Z. Tinker, for years supervisor of music in the local public schools. At the time of its installation it was among the largest municipal pipe organs in the world. In 2013, the University of Evansville purchased the pipe organ, dismantled it, and put it into storage. The university hopes to restore it to full operating condition sometime in the future.

== Modern use ==
When the Old National Events Plaza was later constructed, the Coliseum's use as an auditorium and convention space waned. In 1971 Vanderburgh County leased the building to the Vanderburgh County Veterans Council for a period of 99 years at the rate of $1 a year.

The Coliseum's Convention Hall still retains a seating capacity of 2,400 and a standing room capacity of 4,055. The Veterans Council leases out the venue for sporting events, exhibitions, stage plays, wedding receptions, musical productions, bingo, concerts, and philanthropic organizations. The Coliseum is also home to the Demolition City Roller Derby's two teams: the Dynamite Dolls and Destruction Dames. The Coliseum is also home to various professional wrestling promotions, such as the Continental Wrestling Association and the United States Wrestling Association.

In July 2022, it was announced that the Evansville Civic Theater (formerly The Old Columbia Theater) would be moving to the Coliseum after its slated renovations were completed.
