= 1916–17 Georgetown Hoyas men's basketball team =

American college basketball season

1916–17 Georgetown Hoyas men's basketball
- Conference: Independent
- Record: 8–4
- Head coach: John O'Reilly (3rd season)
- Captain: Bob O'Lone
- Home arena: Ryan Gymnasium

1916–17 NCAA men's basketball independents standings
	Conf.				Overall
Team	W		L	PCT	W		L	PCT
Navy		–		–	11	–	0	1.000
Washington and Lee		–		–	13	–	0	1.000
Washington College		–		–	2	–	0	1.000
Montana State		–		–	19	–	1	.950
Western Reserve		–		–	12	–	1	.923
Kalamazoo		–		–	12	–	1	.923
Louisiana State		–		–	20	–	2	.909
Wabash		–		–	19	–	2	.905
Canisius		–		–	9	–	1	.900
Creighton		–		–	18	–	2	.900
Virginia Tech		–		–	17	–	2	.895
Georgia		–		–	8	–	1	.889
North Dakota		–		–	8	–	1	.889
Akron		–		–	14	–	2	.875
Brigham Young		–		–	14	–	2	.875
Roanoke		–		–	7	–	1	.875
Central Missouri		–		–	13	–	2	.867
Carleton		–		–	12	–	2	.857
The Citadel		–		–	6	–	1	.857
Penn State		–		–	12	–	2	.857
SMU		–		–	12	–	2	.857
Wisconsin–Stevens Point		–		–	11	–	2	.846
Arizona		–		–	10	–	2	.833
CCNY		–		–	15	–	3	.833
Trinity (N.C.)		–		–	20	–	4	.833
Denison		–		–	13	–	3	.813
Seton Hall		–		–	13	–	3	.813
Southwestern (Kan.)		–		–	13	–	3	.813
Syracuse		–		–	13	–	3	.813
Clemson		–		–	8	–	2	.800
Miami (Ohio)		–		–	12	–	3	.800
New Mexico		–		–	4	–	1	.800
Santa Clara		–		–	8	–	2	.800
Colgate		–		–	15	–	4	.789
Lehigh		–		–	15	–	4	.789
St. Joseph's		–		–	18	–	5	.783
Indiana State		–		–	13	–	4	.765
New York University		–		–	9	–	3	.750
Oklahoma A&M		–		–	11	–	4	.733
Augustana (Ill.)		–		–	8	–	3	.727
Dayton		–		–	8	–	3	.727
Fordham		–		–	8	–	3	.727
Marquette		–		–	8	–	3	.727
North Dakota Agricultural		–		–	10	–	4	.714
Saint Mary's (Calif.)		–		–	15	–	6	.714
Duquesne		–		–	7	–	3	.700
Millikin		–		–	14	–	6	.700
Nebraska Wesleyan		–		–	14	–	6	.700
Grinnell		–		–	9	–	4	.692
Bucknell		–		–	11	–	5	.688
Gettysburg		–		–	11	–	5	.688
Michigan State		–		–	11	–	5	.688
Tulane		–		–	11	–	5	.688
Marietta		–		–	13	–	6	.684
Boston University		–		–	6	–	3	.667
Georgetown		–		–	8	–	4	.667
Nevada		–		–	6	–	3	.667
New Mexico A&M		–		–	10	–	5	.667
North Central		–		–	10	–	5	.667
Pittsburgh		–		–	12	–	6	.667
Rice		–		–	10	–	5	.667
Springfield (Mass.)		–		–	10	–	5	.667
Tennessee		–		–	10	–	5	.667
Toledo		–		–	2	–	1	.667
Davidson		–		–	11	–	6	.647
VMI		–		–	9	–	5	.643
Richmond		–		–	7	–	4	.636
Bradley		–		–	10	–	6	.625
Lafayette		–		–	15	–	9	.625
Oklahoma		–		–	13	–	8	.619
Notre Dame		–		–	8	–	5	.615
Utah State		–		–	8	–	5	.615
Ole Miss		–		–	11	–	7	.611
Tulsa		–		–	11	–	7	.611
Mississippi A&M		–		–	6	–	4	.600
Wake Forest		–		–	9	–	6	.600
Virginia		–		–	7	–	5	.583
St. John's (N.Y.)		–		–	11	–	8	.579
Delaware		–		–	8	–	6	.571
Union (N.Y.)		–		–	9	–	7	.563
Detroit		–		–	5	–	4	.556
North Carolina		–		–	5	–	4	.556
North Carolina State		–		–	10	–	8	.556
Catholic		–		–	6	–	5	.545
Butler		–		–	7	–	6	.538
Western State Normal		–		–	7	–	6	.538
Temple		–		–	10	–	9	.526
Auburn		–		–	2	–	2	.500
DePauw		–		–	7	–	7	.500
Idaho		–		–	8	–	8	.500
Loyola (Md.)		–		–	6	–	6	.500
Millsaps		–		–	5	–	5	.500
Stevens Institute		–		–	3	–	3	.500
Utah		–		–	3	–	3	.500
Washington & Jefferson		–		–	5	–	5	.500
West Virginia		–		–	8	–	8	.500
Wyoming		–		–	4	–	4	.500
George Washington		–		–	7	–	8	.467
Manhattan		–		–	7	–	8	.467
South Carolina		–		–	7	–	8	.467
Grove City		–		–	5	–	6	.455
Saint Louis		–		–	5	–	6	.455
Rutgers		–		–	4	–	5	.444
Alabama		–		–	6	–	8	.429
Buffalo		–		–	6	–	8	.429
Mount Union		–		–	6	–	8	.429
Northern Colorado		–		–	5	–	7	.417
Connecticut		–		–	4	–	6	.400
Kentucky		–		–	4	–	6	.400
Southern California		–		–	8	–	12	.400
Wooster		–		–	5	–	8	.385
Swarthmore		–		–	4	–	7	.364
Franklin		–		–	1	–	2	.333
Muhlenberg		–		–	2	–	4	.333
Washburn		–		–	5	–	11	.313
William & Mary		–		–	4	–	9	.308
Niagara		–		–	2	–	5	.286
Army		–		–	3	–	8	.273
Cincinnati		–		–	3	–	8	.273
Vanderbilt		–		–	3	–	8	.273
Montana		–		–	4	–	11	.267
Bowling Green State		–		–	2	–	6	.250
Kent State		–		–	2	–	6	.250
Rhode Island State		–		–	2	–	6	.250
Rochester (N.Y.)		–		–	4	–	12	.250
Texas Christian		–		–	2	–	6	.250
Fairmount		–		–	2	–	11	.154
Ohio		–		–	2	–	14	.125
Tempe Normal		–		–	0	–	1	.000

The 1916–17 Georgetown Hoyas men's basketball team represented Georgetown University during the 1916-17 NCAA college basketball season. John O'Reilly coached the team in his third season as head coach. Georgetown was an independent and played its home games at Ryan Gymnasium on the Georgetown campus in Washington, D.C., and finished the season with a record of 8–4.

== Season recap ==
The Hoyas' victory over Bucknell on the last day of the season began a home winning streak at Ryan Gymnasium that would reach 52 games before finally coming to an end during the 1923–24 season. Georgetown also defeated crosstown rival George Washington twice this season, giving the Hoyas a six-game winning streak against George Washington – five of the wins at Ryan Gymnasium – dating back to 1915.

A graduate of St. Francis College of Pennsylvania, where he had played basketball, forward Fred Fees enrolled in Georgetown University Law School and joined the team – permitted despite his undergraduate playing time under the eligibility rules of the era – for the first of four seasons with the Hoyas. A free-throw shooting specialist in an era when the rules of college basketball allowed teams to choose which player shot its free throws, Fees exploited his free-throw prowess to establish himself as one of the top scorers in college basketball in the United States in each of his seasons with the Hoyas. This season he scored 195 of the team's 450 points, averaging 15.3 points per game to lead the team in scoring. He also shot 17-for-21 from the free-throw line in a game against George Washington, setting a school record for free throws made in a single game that no Hoya would exceed for 75 years.

== Roster ==
Georgetown players did not wear numbers on their jerseys this season. The first numbered jerseys in Georgetown men's basketball history would not appear until the 1933–34 season.

Name	Height	Weight (lbs.)	Position	Class	Hometown	Previous Team(s)
Ed Bannigan	N/A	N/A	G	Fr. or Jr.	Manchester, NH, U.S.	Manchester HS
Ed Cashin	N/A	N/A	F	Jr.	N/A	N/A
George Denniston	N/A	N/A	G	Jr.	N/A	N/A
Fred Fees	5'6"	N/A	F	So.	Carrolltown, PA, U.S.	St. Francis College (Pa.)
Roger Kelliher (or Keliher)	N/A	N/A	G	Sr.	N/A	N/A
Jim McNulty	N/A	N/A	C	Jr.	N/A	N/A
Harry O'Boyle	N/A	N/A	G	N/A	N/A	N/A
Jim O'Boyle	N/A	N/A	G	Fr.	N/A	N/A
Bob O'Lone	N/A	N/A	F	Jr.	N/A	N/A

== 1916–17 schedule and results ==
It was common practice at this time for colleges and universities to include non-collegiate opponents in their schedules, with the games recognized as part of their official record for the season, and had the February 3, 1917, game against the Crescent Athletic Club not been cancelled, it would have counted as part of Georgetown's won-loss record for 1916-17. It was not until 1952, after the completion of the 1951–52 season, that the National Collegiate Athletic Association (NCAA) ruled that colleges and universities could no longer count games played against non-collegiate opponents in their annual won-loss records.

Trinity College of North Carolina was the future Duke University.

Date time, TV	Opponent	Result	Record	Site city, state
Regular Season
Fri., Dec. 15, 1916 no, no	at Mount St. Joseph	W 36–25	1-0	Mount St. Joseph Gymnasium; Baltimore, MD
Thu., Dec. 28, 1916 no, no	Maryland	cancelled		Ryan Gymnasium; Washington, DC
Wed., Jan. 10, 1917 no, no	Gallaudet	W 52–10	2-0	Ryan Gymnasium; Washington, DC
Fri., Jan. 12, 1917 no, no	Johns Hopkins	W 46-12	3-0	Ryan Gymnasium; Baltimore, MD
Tue., Jan. 16, 1917 no, no	Randolph–Macon	cancelled		Ryan Gymnasium; Washington, DC
Sat., Jan. 20, 1917 no, no	at George Washington	W 31–24	4-0	YMCA Hall; Washington, DC
Wed., Jan. 24, 1917 no, no	at Navy	L 23–31	4-1	Dahlgren Hall; Annapolis, MD
Fri., Jan. 26, 1917 no, no	St. John's	W 44–26	5-1	Ryan Gymnasium; Washington, DC
Wed., Jan. 31, 1917 no, no	at Seton Hall	L 17–18	5-2	N/A; South Orange, NJ
Thu., Feb. 1, 1917 no, no	at St. John's	L 24–38	5-3	N/A; New York, NY
Sat., Feb. 3, 1917 no, no	at Crescent Athletic Club	cancelled		N/A; New York, NY
Wed., Feb. 7, 1917 no, no	George Washington	W 45–23	6-3	Ryan Gymnasium; Washington, DC
Sat., Feb. 10, 1917 no, no	at Mount St. Joseph	W 32–15	7-3	Mount St. Joseph Gymnasium; Baltimore, MD
Thu., Feb. 15, 1917 no, no	Trinity (N.C.)	L 24–36	7-4	Ryan Gymnasium; Washington, DC
Mon., Feb. 19, 1917 no, no	Bucknell	W 43–31	8-4	Ryan Gymnasium; Washington, DC
*Non-conference game. (#) Tournament seedings in parentheses.
