= 1923 Southern Intercollegiate men's basketball tournament =

1923 Southern Conference men's basketball tournament
- Classification: Division I
- Teams: 22
- Site: Municipal Auditorium; Atlanta, GA
- Champions: Mississippi Aggies (1st title)
- Top scorer: Bill Redd (Chattanooga) (62 points)

1922–23 Southern Conference men's basketball standings
| | Conf. | | | | Overall |
| Team | W | | L | PCT | W | | L | PCT |
|---|---|---|---|---|---|---|---|---|
| North Carolina | 5 | – | 0 | 1.000 | 15 | – | 1 | .938 |
| Vanderbilt | 2 | – | 0 | 1.000 | 16 | – | 8 | .667 |
| Tulane | 5 | – | 1 | .833 | 15 | – | 3 | .833 |
| Tennessee | 3 | – | 1 | .750 | 15 | – | 2 | .882 |
| Mississippi A&M† | 8 | – | 3 | .727 | 15 | – | 4 | .789 |
| Washington and Lee | 4 | – | 2 | .667 | 7 | – | 8 | .467 |
| Georgia Tech | 5 | – | 3 | .625 | 9 | – | 9 | .500 |
| Alabama | 3 | – | 3 | .500 | 20 | – | 5 | .800 |
| Clemson | 3 | – | 3 | .500 | 11 | – | 6 | .647 |
| Georgia | 3 | – | 3 | .500 | 11 | – | 8 | .579 |
| Auburn | 2 | – | 3 | .400 | 7 | – | 7 | .500 |
| Mississippi | 2 | – | 4 | .333 | 8 | – | 7 | .533 |
| Virginia Tech | 1 | – | 2 | .333 | 13 | – | 6 | .684 |
| NC State | 1 | – | 2 | .333 | 5 | – | 8 | .385 |
| Virginia | 1 | – | 3 | .250 | 12 | – | 5 | .706 |
| South Carolina | 0 | – | 3 | .000 | 6 | – | 13 | .316 |
| Florida | 0 | – | 3 | .000 | 2 | – | 5 | .286 |
| Kentucky | 0 | – | 5 | .000 | 3 | – | 10 | .231 |
| LSU | 0 | – | 6 | .000 | 10 | – | 10 | .500 |
† Southern Intercollegiate Tournament winner

The 1923 Southern Intercollegiate men's basketball tournament took place between teams of both the Southern Conference and Southern Intercollegiate Athletic Association from February 27–March 3, 1923, at Municipal Auditorium in Atlanta, Georgia. The Mississippi A&M Aggies won their first Southern Conference title. After MSU won the tournament, a celebration broke out in downtown Starkville. A bonfire was built, and when firemen arrived to put it out, students chopped up their water hose and even hit one of the firemen over the head with a bugle.

== Bracket ==
First round February 27
VPI
Bye
Vanderbilt | 36
LSU | 10
Chattanooga | 43
Georgetown | 27
South Carolina
Bye
Wofford | 25
Alabama | 44
Newberry
Bye
Mercer | 45
Auburn | 24
Georgia | 23
Tennessee | 19
Centre | 27
Clemson | 23
Georgia Tech
Bye
North Carolina | 28
Mississippi College | 21
Mississippi
Bye
Furman | 40
Millsaps | 21
Mississippi A&M
Bye

Second round February 28
VPI | 26
Vanderbilt | 23
Chattanooga
Bye
South Carolina | 24
Alabama | 49
Newberry | 22
Mercer | 34
Georgia
Bye
Centre | 26
Georgia Tech | 34
North Carolina | 32
Mississippi | 34
Furman | 21
Mississippi A&M | 47

Quarterfinals; March 1
VPI | 23
Chattanooga | 38
Alabama | 23
Mercer | 28
Georgia | 22
Georgia Tech | 27
Mississippi | 25
Mississippi A&M | 33

Semifinals; March 2
Chattanooga | 24
Mercer | 19
Georgia Tech | 17
Mississippi A&M | 25

Finals; March 3
Chattanooga | 21
Mississippi A&M | 31

* Overtime game

=== Championship ===
March 3

Chattanooga 21, Mississippi A&M 31
| Pts: Yarnell Barnes 8 | Pts: B. E. Norris 12 |

Municipal Auditorium, Atlanta, Georgia
Referees: Stanley Sutton

== All-Southern tournament team ==
| Player | Position | Class | Team |
|---|---|---|---|
| K. P. Gatchell | G | Junior | Mississippi A&M |
| Baby Roane | G | Junior | Georgia Tech |
| H. G. Perkins | F | Senior | Mississippi A&M |
| Consuello Smith | F | Senior | Mercer |
| Bill Redd | C | Senior | Chattanooga |

== See also ==
- List of Southern Conference men's basketball champions
