= 1922 College Basketball All-Southern Team =

The 1922 College Basketball All-Southern Team consisted of basketball players from the South chosen at their respective positions.

== All-Southerns ==
=== Guards ===
- George Harmon, Mercer (C, GB, MB, MT, MN)
- Monk McDonald, North Carolina (C, GB, MB, MT [as f], MN)
- Tom Ryan, Vanderbilt (MT, MN)
- Billy Carmichael, North Carolina (MT)

=== Forwards ===
- Chuck Wollet, Newberry (C, GB)
- Baby Roane, Georgia Tech (GB [as g], MB)
- Consuello Smith, Mercer (MT, MN)
- Paul Adkins, Kentucky (GB)
- Sidney Perry, North Carolina (MN)

=== Center ===
- Bill Redd, Chattanooga (C, GB, MB, MT, MN)
- Cartwright Carmichael, North Carolina (C, GB [as f], MB [as f], MT [as f], MN [as f])
- Robert Gamble, Mercer (GB, MT, MN)

== Key ==
- C = the composite pick of sportswriters at the SIAA tournament.
- GB = selected by Guy Butler of the Atlanta Georgian.
- MB = selected by Morgan Blake in the Atlanta Journal.
- MT = selected by the Macon Telegraph.
- MN = selected by the Macon News.
