= 1921–22 Mercer Baptists men's basketball team =

American college basketball season

1921–22 Mercer Bears men's basketball
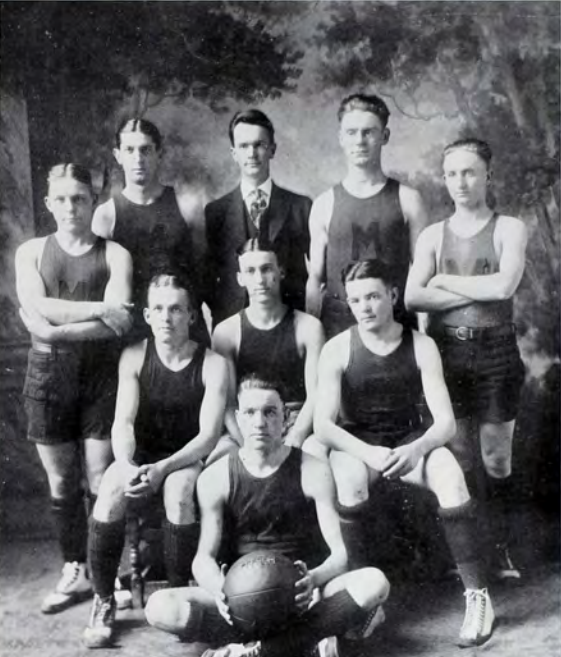

SIAA Champion
- Conference: Southern Intercollegiate Athletic Association
- Record: 17–7 (11–5 SIAA)
- Head coach: Josh Cody
- Captain: Smokey Harper

The 1921–22 Mercer Baptists men's basketball team represented Mercer University in the 1921–22 NCAA men's basketball season. The team claimed an SIAA championship, and was runner-up to North Carolina in the 1922 Southern Conference men's basketball tournament. Mercer pulled the upset of the tournament when they beat defending champion Kentucky 35 to 22.

The Baptists were led by coach Josh Cody and featured players receiving All-Southern votes at each position: running guard George Harmon, forward Consuello Smith, and center Bob Gamble. At the other forward was Bubber Pope, and the other, standing guard was captain Smokey Harper. Harper was a veteran of World War I.

Bob Gamble hit a half-court buzzer beater to beat Georgia Tech.

== Schedule ==
Schedule
Date time, TV	Opponent	Result	Record	Site (attendance) city, state
Regular season
*	Macon Volunteers	W 33–26	1–0	
*	Camp Benning	L 20–24	1–1	
*	Albany YMCA	W 30–18	2–1	
*	Jacksonville YMCA	W 53–27	3–1	
*	Waycross YMCA	W 38–18	4–1	
*	Savannah YMCA	W 56–26	5–1	
January 7, 1922	Georgia Tech	W 28–26	6–1	City Auditorium (2,000); Macon, GA
January 13, 1922	Auburn	W 31–7	7–1	City Auditorium; Macon, GA
	at Clemson	W 32–9	8–1	
	at Georgia Tech	L 35–44	8–2	Atlanta, GA
	at Chattanooga	L 18–21	8–3	Chattanooga, TN
*	at Bryson	W 28–11	9–3	
January 24	at Vanderbilt	L 17–18	9–4	Y Gym; Nashville, TN
January 27	at Georgia	W 27–18	10–4	Moss Auditorium; Athens, GA
January 28	Florida	W 27–26	11–4	
February 2, 1922	at Auburn	W 28–26	12–4	Alumni Gymnasium; Auburn, AL
	Camp Benning	L 12–37	12–5	
February 4	Chattanooga	W 31–26	13–5	
February 11	Georgia	L 24–31	13–6	City Auditorium; Macon, GA
Southern Conference tournament
	Centre; SIC tournament first round	W 32–17	14–6	Atlanta Memorial Auditorium; Atlanta, GA
February 25, 1922*	Kentucky; SIC tournament second round	W 35–22	15–6	Atlanta Memorial Auditorium; Atlanta, GA
	Chattanooga; SIC Tournament quarterfinals	W 25–18	16–6	Atlanta Memorial Auditorium; Atlanta, GA
February 26, 1922	Georgia Tech; SIC Tournament semifinals	W 29–14	17–6	Atlanta Memorial Auditorium; Atlanta, GA
*	North Carolina; SIC Tournament Championship	L 26–40	17–7	Atlanta Memorial Auditorium; Atlanta, GA
*Non-conference game. ^{#}Rankings from AP Poll. (#) Tournament seedings in parentheses.
