= List of Chattanooga Mocs men's basketball head coaches =

The following is a list of Chattanooga Mocs men's basketball head coaches. There have been 22 head coaches of the Mocs in their 105-season history.

Chattanooga's current head coach is Dan Earl. He was hired as the Mocs' head coach in March 2022, replacing Lamont Paris, who left to become the head coach at South Carolina.

No.	Tenure	Coach	Years	Record	Pct.
1	1912–1913	Leslie Stauffer	1	7–7	.500
2	1915–1916	Johnny Spiegel	1	3–4	.429
3	1918–1920	W. V. Jarrett	2	8–3	.727
4	1920–1928	Bill Redd	8	62–42	.596
5	1928–1931 (Note: Drew resigned seven games into the 1930–31 season, and was replaced by Phillips on a permanent basis.)	Harold Drew	3	25–24	.510
6	1931–1933	Humpy Phillips	3	33–19	.635
7	1933–1940 (Note: Keyser retired six games into the 1939–40 season, and was replaced by Shoemaker on a permanent basis.)	Pop Keyser	7	37–78	.322
8	1940–1942; 1946–1947	Perron Shoemaker	3	20–51	.282
9	1945–1946; 1947–1954 (Note: O'Brien coached only the first game of the 1954–55 season, and was replaced by Boulware on a permanent basis.)	Bill O'Brien	9	50–84	.373
10	1954–1958	Ben Boulware	4	9–57	.136
11	1958–1962	Tommy Bartlett	4	57–37	.606
12	1962–1972	Leon Ford	10	126–126	.500
13	1972–1979	Ron Shumate	7	139–61	.695
14	1979–1985	Murray Arnold	6	135–46	.746
15	1985–1997	Mack McCarthy	12	243–122	.666
16	1997–2002	Henry Dickerson	5	72–73	.497
17	2002–2004	Jeff Lebo	2	40–20	.667
18	2004–2013	John Shulman	9	145–146	.498
19	2013–2015	Will Wade	2	40–25	.615
20	2015–2017	Matt McCall	2	48–18	.727
21	2017–2022	Lamont Paris	5	87–72	.547
22	2022–present	Dan Earl	1	18–17	.514
Totals		22 coaches	105 seasons	1,404–1,132	.554
Records updated through end of 2022–23 season Source
