= 1923 College Basketball All-Southern Team =

The 1923 College Basketball All-Southern Team consisted of basketball players from the South chosen at their respective positions.

== Composite team ==
Name	Position	School	Votes
K. P. Gatchell	Guard	Mississippi A&M	6
Bill Redd	Center	Chattanooga	6
Consuello Smith	Forward	Mercer	6
Baby Roane	Guard	Georgia Tech	5
H. G. Perkins	Forward	Mississippi A&M	3
George Harmon	Guard	Mercer	2
Yarnell Barnes	Guard	Chattanooga	1
Rhodes	Forward	VPI	1

== All-Southerns ==
=== Guards ===
- K. P. Gatchell, Mississippi A&M (W)
- George Harmon, Mercer
- Yarnell Barnes, Chattanooga

=== Forwards ===
- Consuello Smith, Mercer (W)
- Baby Roane, Georgia Tech (W [as g])
- H. G. Perkins, Mississippi A&M (W)
- Rhodes, VPI

=== Center ===
- Bill Redd, Chattanooga (W)

== Key ==
- W = selected by writers attending the SoCon tournament.
