= Josh Cody =

American athlete & coach (1892–1961)

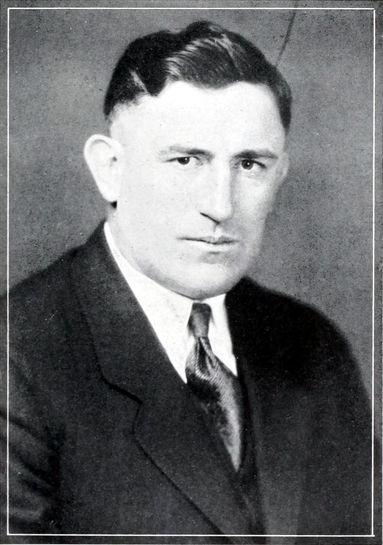
- Cody at Clemson in 1931

Biographical details
- Born: June 11, 1892; Franklin, Tennessee, U.S.
- Died: June 17, 1961 (aged 69); Mount Laurel, New Jersey, U.S.

Playing career

Football
- 1911–1913: Bethel (KY)
- 1914–1916: Vanderbilt
- 1917: Camp Jackson
- 1919: Vanderbilt

Basketball
- 1919–1920: Vanderbilt
- Positions: Tackle (football); Forward (basketball)

Coaching career (HC unless noted)

Football
- 1920–1922: Mercer
- 1923–1926: Vanderbilt (assistant)
- 1927–1930: Clemson
- 1931–1934: Vanderbilt (assistant)
- 1936–1939: Florida
- 1940–1947: Temple (line)
- 1955: Temple

Basketball
- 1921–1923: Mercer
- 1923–1927: Vanderbilt
- 1927–1931: Clemson
- 1931–1936: Vanderbilt
- 1936–1937: Florida
- 1942–1952: Temple

Baseball
- 1921–1922: Mercer

Administrative career (AD unless noted)
- 1936–1939: Florida
- 1952–1959: Temple

Head coaching record
- Overall: 55–62–3 (football); 273–272 (basketball)

Accomplishments and honors

Championships
- Football: SIAA (as player, 1915); Basketball: SIAA (as player, 1920); SIAA (as coach, 1922); SoCon tournament (1927)

Awards
- 4× All-Southern (1914, 1915, 1916, 1919); 2× Third-team All-American (1915, 1919); Outing Roll of Honor (1914); Porter Cup (1920); AP Southeast All-Time team (1869–1919); FWAA All-time All-America Team (1869–1918); One of Dan McGugin's six best players 1934 All-time Vandy team Tennessee Sports Hall of Fame
- College Football Hall of Fame; Inducted in 1970 (profile)

Joshua Crittenden Cody (June 11, 1892 – June 17, 1961) was an American college athlete, head coach, and athletics director. "Josh" Cody was a native of Tennessee and an alumnus of Vanderbilt University, where he earned 13 letters playing several sports.

As a versatile tackle and blocker on the Vanderbilt Commodores football team, he was a three-time All-American. During his four years on the team, Cody helped Vanderbilt score 1,099 points, winning 23 of 35 games.

In 1969, Cody was named by the Football Writers Association of America to the 1869–1918 Early Era All-American Team. He was inducted as a player into the College Football Hall of Fame in 1970. Coach Charley Moran called Cody the greatest tackle ever to play in the South.

After graduation from Vanderbilt, Cody coached college football and basketball and served as the athletics director at various universities, including: Clemson University, the University of Florida and Temple University. He also was an assistant for head football coaches Dan McGugin and Ray Morrison at Vanderbilt.

Cody coached three different schools in the Southern Intercollegiate Athletic Association's (S.I.A.A.) basketball tournament. His Vanderbilt team won the tournament in 1927.

== Early life and education ==
Josh Cody was born in Franklin, Tennessee, on June 11, 1892, the second of James Wadkins and Sarah Elizabeth (née Crittenden) Cody's three children. Cody's father was a house painter. The family lived in Alabama for a time and moved back to Tennessee. Cody was raised in Franklin and graduated high school from Battle Ground Academy prep school. His high school nickname was "Buff" because his surname reminded people of "Buffalo Bill" Cody.

== College career began at Bethel College ==
Cody first played football for three seasons at the Russellville, Kentucky campus of Bethel College. In 1912 the Bethel football team suffered a 105–0 loss to Vanderbilt.

== Vanderbilt University ==
In 1914, at the age of 22, he enrolled at Vanderbilt University and was a member of the football, basketball, baseball, and track and field teams, earning a total of thirteen varsity letters. One source called Cody: "the interference-smashingest, goal-cageingest, home-run knockingest, super-athlete in all Dixie." Nashville Banner sportswriter and Vanderbilt alumnus Fred Russell described Cody: "When I think of Josh in his college days, I get a mental picture of this great big fellow playing catcher in the spring between innings running out beyond the outfield to throw the shot or the discus in his baseball uniform. He was unbelievably skilled and nimble for a big man in basketball, and in football where he's a legend."

=== Football ===
Cody played for legendary coach Dan McGugin's football team as an offensive and defensive tackle (teams played one-platoon football in those days), but was versatile enough to play quarterback, running back, and kicker at times. Fuzzy Woodruff described Cody as "a great kicker and a tower of strength on offense."

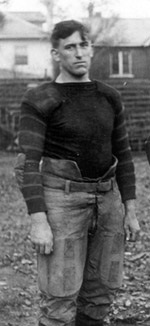
Cody in football uniform.

He was a very large player at some 6 feet 4 inches (1.93 m), and 225 pounds (102 kg). McGugin later selected him as one of the six best players he ever coached.

Cody was known as a sure tackler and a fierce blocker, who helped the Commodores score 1,099 points to 226 in thirty-five games (31.4 points per game). During Cody’s four years at Vanderbilt, the Commodores posted a record of 23-9-3.

Cody was selected to at least one All-Southern team every year he played, and for an All-time Vanderbilt team published in its 1934 yearbook. Charley Moran called Cody the greatest tackle ever to play in the South.

Journalist Ralph McGill, once a teammate of Cody's, said:

He was a great big fellow and one of the most seriously dedicated fellows I've ever met. He was a farm boy and he didn't have any polish but he was very honest and sincere. He didn't have scholarship—we had none in those days— but he had a real job. He literally cleaned the gymnasium every day, cleaned up the locker rooms and the showers, and tended to the coal furnace after practice. He was a big man, squarely built, quiet, almost shy, and enormously decent. He practiced long hours to place kick and became the team's place kicker. He wasn't fast, but he was fast for a big man. He didn't like to wear pads. He got a hold of an old quilt and sewed it to the shoulders of the jersey and that was all the padding he wore.

==== 1914 ====
In Cody's freshman year of 1914, Vanderbilt returned only ten men with experience and finished with a 2–6 record, McGugin's first losing season, and only the second losing season in the school's twenty-five years of playing football. (Note: Rival Tennessee had its first championship of any kind.)

In his second game, a 23–3 loss to Michigan in Ann Arbor, Cody converted a 45-yard (41.148 m) drop kick field goal. At one point he also fell on Michigan's Tommy Hughitt while both dove after a fumble. Though the referees did not call roughing, Michigan was bitter about the lack of a call throughout the game, and shortly after even threatened to end the contest between the two schools. In his fifth game, a 20–7 loss to Virginia, Cody dropped back into the backfield and threw a touchdown pass to Irby "Rabbit" Curry, the team's regular quarterback. Cody received his first national honor at season's end from Outing magazine's Football Roll of Honor.

==== 1915 ====
In 1915, Vanderbilt finished with a 9–1 record and a Southern Intercollegiate Athletic Association (SIAA) championship. Cody earned his second national honor – a third team, All-America selection from Walter Camp. The "point-a-minute" Commodores outscored their opponents by an incredible 514–38. Their only loss was a 35–10 setback to Virginia — a game in which Cody drop kicked a 20-yard field goal. (Note: Virginia lost only to Harvard, which lost only to national champion Cornell.)

Cody personally took over the Auburn game after Vanderbilt was up 17–0. In one of the greatest exhibitions of punt covering, Cody smothered the receiver every time, recovering two fumbles, including one across the goal line for a touchdown. Then, in the last ten seconds of play, Cody dropped kicked a three-pointer from the 33-yard line. In the season's final game against rival Sewanee, tackles Cody and Tom Lipscomb blocked a punt leading to the game's second touchdown. Irby Curry later had an 80-yard touchdown with Cody clearing the path. The final score was 28–3. Cody also received an offer to play for Navy.

==== 1916–1918 ====
Cody as U.S. Army Lieutenant, c. 1917–1918

In 1916, Cody helped Vanderbilt to a 7–1–1 record, and was selected All-Southern, but was not recognized as an All-American. (Note: Quarterback Curry, however, was a third-team All-America selection of Walter Camp.) The season started with a question over his eligibility due to formerly playing at Bethel, but was resolved. (Note: One source calls him "the most feared lineman in the South.")

===== World War I =====
He was elected captain of next year's team at season's end, but instead served in the U.S. Army during World War I as a lieutenant in 1917 and 1918. Cody played football during the war at Camp Jackson.

==== 1919 ====
Cody then returned to Vanderbilt for his senior year in 1919. Cody again starred in the Auburn game, giving the SIAA champion its only loss on the year with a 15-yard fumble return and extra point to win 7–6. The Commodores finished 5–1–2, and Cody was named an All-American for the third time, as he again earned a third-team selection by Walter Camp; becoming the only Vanderbilt athlete to be named a three-time All-American. He spurned an offer from the Canton Bulldogs to play professional football.

==== Basketball ====
Cody was a forward on the basketball teams coached by Ray Morrison. Tom Zerfoss and Cody were the starting forwards on the SIAA champion 1919–1920 team. (Note: Other teammates included Gus Morrow, Johnny "Red" Floyd, and Alf Adams.) As a senior, Cody won the Porter Cup as the school's best all-around athlete.

== Coaching career ==
=== Coaching philosophy ===
While coaching at Mercer, Cody was quoted as telling the team "Of course I want you to win. My job depends on it. But rather than for you to commit one unsportsmanlike act, I'd prefer to lose every game we play."

=== Mercer University ===
After graduating college in 1920, Mercer University in Macon, Georgia hired Cody as its "Physical Director" - the head coach and athletic director of all college sport. The Mercer University Bulletin said of Cody:

"No fairer, squarer athlete ever played a game, and when the final history of southern football is written the name of Josh Cody will stand as that of the greatest tackle that ever crossed chalk marks of Dixie."

In 1922 the Mercer Baptists football team was crippled, having many star players out with dengue fever. Former Georgia Tech running back Everett Strupper was an assistant coach. The basketball team was led by George Harmon and won the SIAA as runner-up to North Carolina in the 1922 SoCon men's basketball tournament.

=== Vanderbilt ===
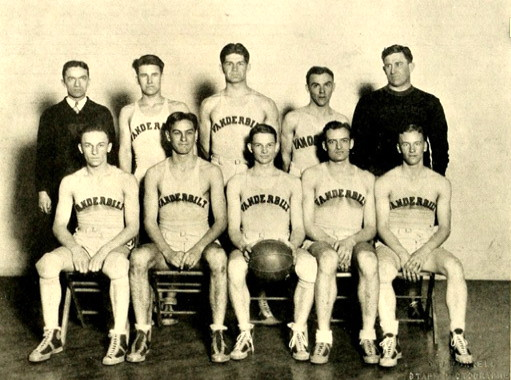
The 1927 SoCon tournament champion Vanderbilt basketball team. Cody is top right.

In 1923, he returned to Vanderbilt, where he became the head coach of the school's baseball and basketball teams. During that time, he also served as an assistant football coach to McGugin. (Note: He replaced Wallace Wade, who had left to coach Alabama, in all these capacities.) Cody's first year as an assistant on the football team in 1923 saw the last conference title for Vanderbilt in the sport to date. In 1926, the football team lost only to Wade's Alabama.

His 1926–27 basketball team finished 20–4—the best record in school history—and won the Southern Conference tournament championship. Cody had a variety of superstitions while coaching his basketball team, including not laundering jerseys during a winning streak until a game was lost, and starting contests with the same lineup.

=== Clemson University ===
From 1927 to 1930, Cody was head coach of both the Clemson basketball and football teams, the last coach at Clemson to coach two revenue-producing sports. During his tenure, he compiled a 29–11–1 record as football coach, including a perfect 4–0 record against archrival South Carolina and a near-perfect 13–0–1 at home. He was 48–55 as basketball coach. Cody was popular with the Clemson student body, who called him "Big Man" because of his large stature.

In 1927 he gave future Vanderbilt head football coach Red Sanders his first coaching job as backfield coach. In May 1929, when rumors were swirling that he might leave to coach a bigger-name program, the students, faculty, and staff took up a collection to buy him a brand new black Buick automobile. Raymond Johnson wrote upon Cody's death: "Josh Cody wanted to be Vanderbilt's coach so bad that he gave up the head man's job at Clemson College after four successful seasons."

Cody and athletic director Mutt Gee were the impetus in building the Clemson Field House gymnasium. The on-campus recreation facility project cost $60,000 (equivalent to $1,125,000 in 2025).

Fred Russell had a well-known story of Cody during a chicken-eating contest at Clemson with Herman Stegeman, the coach at Georgia. "Josh weighed about 260 then. He outstripped Stegeman by eleven chickens. He wasn't satisfied just to win. He just went on to a decisive victory." As Cody explained: "I got two chickens ahead of him early and just coasted."

=== Vanderbilt again ===
In 1931, he returned to Vanderbilt as head coach of the basketball team and assistant football coach. In his second stint as Vanderbilt's basketball coach, Cody went 51–50. In 1934, when McGugin retired, Cody was passed over for the head coaching job in favor of former Vanderbilt quarterback and SMU coach Ray Morrison. Morrison brought his own staff from SMU and neglected Cody's coaching abilities, but Cody remained basketball coach through the 1935–1936 season. His Commodores basketball teams tallied 51–50 in five seasons.

=== Florida ===
Cody diagramming a play at Florida.

Disappointed at being passed over for the Commodores' football head coaching job, Cody left Vanderbilt in 1936 and, with McGugin's help, was picked by Edgar Jones to become athletic director and head football coach at Florida, where he succeeded Dutch Stanley and compiled a poor 17–24–2 record in the four seasons from 1936 to 1939. Florida's lone All-SEC selection during this period was Walter "Tiger" Mayberry in 1937. The 1937 team defeated the Georgia Bulldogs in the two teams' annual rivalry game for the first time in eight years. In 1938, Cody lost at home to Pop Warner's Temple 20–12 in the last game Warner ever coached.

Perhaps Cody's finest moment as the Gators' head coach was the 7–0 upset of coach Frank Leahy's then-undefeated, second-ranked Boston College Eagles at Fenway Park in his final season. Sophomore end Fergie Ferguson, namesake of the Fergie Ferguson Award, was the defensive star of the game for the Gators. (Note: Both Mayberry and Ferguson were casualties of World War II.)

=== Temple ===
In 1940, he left Florida and became the line coach under Ray Morrison at Temple. In 1942, he was appointed the head coach of the Temple basketball team. In 1944, he guided the Owls to their first NCAA tournament berth, reaching the Elite Eight. One of his clinics and games at Temple in 1947 drew several hundred players, coaches, and fans. He remained Temple's basketball coach until 1952—compiling a record of 124–103—and then became athletic director.

In 1955, after the sudden resignation of Albert Kawal, he served one year as Temple's head football coach, compiling an 0–8 record. Temple's retirement policy allowed early retirement at age 65 and mandatory retirement at 67. Cody retired at 67 years old in June, 1959.

== Early efforts to fight segregation in sports ==
In 1957 Temple's basketball team was integrated and had earned a place in the NCAA Tournament regional playoff in then segregated Charlotte, North Carolina. Cody was asked about the possibility his team's black players would not be able to enter restaurants or hotels with their fellow white players. Cody threatened to boycott the scheduled NCAA regional tournament game, saying "We will not go down there, if we cannot go as a team... eat together and be housed together. No other arrangement will be acceptable to us... If our team can't go together, we won't go". Cody also insisted the tournament playoff audience not be segregated.

== Retirement, death and burial ==
Cody retired to his 190-acre (0.77 km^{2}) farm across the Delaware River in Moorestown, New Jersey which mostly produced grain. Asked why he purchased the property when he moved from Florida, Cody explained "I had decided I was moving for good. I bought that old farm and figured if Temple fired me I'd still manage to put food on the table". "I guess you can take the boy out of Tennessee but not Tennessee out of the boy".

He died of a heart attack while feeding dogs at his son's nearby home in Mount Laurel, New Jersey on June 17, 1961. Cody was buried June 26, 1961 in Beverly National Cemetery located in Beverly, New Jersey.

Former Vanderbilt quarterback Tommy Henderson said after learning of Cody's death:

Josh was one of my closest friends until he went to Temple. After that I'm afraid we lost contact. He had a lasting influence on the men who played for him. He was kind and considerate but demanding, too. He was a fine defensive basketball coach who believed in aggressive defensive fundamentals. In football, he was respected for what he knew and what he could do with his material."

== Accolades ==
- In 1929, Cody served as an officer and board member of the National Association of Basketball Coaches of the United States (NABC); its honorary president was basketball's inventor James Naismith.
- In 1969, in honor of the centennial of collegiate football, the Football Writers Association of America named two "College Football All-Time Teams" of eleven players — an "early" team consisting of players who played prior to 1920, and a "modern" team who played in 1920 and after. Cody was picked as one of two tackles for the pre-1920 squad.
- In 1969, Cody was named to the Southeast Area All-Time football team (1869–1919 era) by the Associated Press.
- In 1970, Cody was inducted into the College Football Hall of Fame.
- In 1999, Cody was inducted into Tennessee Sports Hall of Fame.

== Head coaching record ==
=== Football ===
Year	Team	Overall	Conference	Standing	Bowl/playoffs
Mercer Baptists (Southern Intercollegiate Athletic Association) (1920–1922)
1920	Mercer	2–7	0–4	25th	
1921	Mercer	3–6	2–5	19th	
1922	Mercer	5–6	1–2	11th	
Mercer:		10–19	3–11		
Clemson Tigers (Southern Conference) (1927–1930)
1927	Clemson	5–3–1	2–2	T–8th	
1928	Clemson	8–3	4–2	T–7th	
1929	Clemson	8–3	3–3	12th	
1930	Clemson	8–2	3–2	9th	
Clemson:		29–11–1	12–9		
Florida Gators (Southeastern Conference) (1936–1939)
1936	Florida	4–6	1–5	11th	
1937	Florida	4–7	3–4	8th	
1938	Florida	4–6–1	2–2–1	7th	
1939	Florida	5–5–1	0–3–1	12th	
Florida:		17–24–2	6–14–2		
Temple Owls (Independent) (1955)
1955	Temple	0–8			
Temple:		0–8			
Total:		55–62–3			

=== Basketball ===
Record table
Season	Team	Overall	Conference	Standing	Postseason
Vanderbilt Commodores (Southern Conference) (1923–1927)
1923–24	Vanderbilt	7–15	1–3	15th	
1924–25	Vanderbilt	12–13	4–3	10th	
1925–26	Vanderbilt	8–18	2–7	17th	
1926–27	Vanderbilt	20–4	7–1	2nd	
Clemson Tigers (Southern Conference) (1927–1931)
1927–28	Clemson	9–14	5–7	11th	
1928–29	Clemson	14–13	6–4	9th	
1929–30	Clemson	16–9	8–4	8th	
1930–31	Clemson	6–7	3–5	15th	
Clemson:		45–43	22–20		
Vanderbilt Commodores (Southern Conference) (1931–1932)
1931–32	Vanderbilt	8–11	5–7	15th	
Vanderbilt Commodores (Southeastern Conference) (1932–1936)
1932–33	Vanderbilt	14–8	11–5	3rd	
1933–34	Vanderbilt	11–6	8–5	5th	
1934–35	Vanderbilt	9–11	9–6	4th	
1935–36	Vanderbilt	9–14	9–4	2nd	
Vanderbilt:		98–100	56–41		
Florida Gators (Southeastern Conference) (1936–1937)
1936–37	Florida	5–13	1–9	12th	
Florida:		5–13	1–9		
Temple Owls (Independent) (1942–1952)
1942–43	Temple	11–11			
1943–44	Temple	14–9			NCAA Regional Third Place
1944–45	Temple	16–7			
1945–46	Temple	12–7			
1946–47	Temple	8–12			
1947–48	Temple	12–11			
1948–49	Temple	14–9			
1949–50	Temple	14–10			
1950–51	Temple	12–13			
1951–52	Temple	9–15			
Temple:		122–104			
Total:		273–272			
National champion Postseason invitational champion Conference regular season champion Conference regular season and conference tournament champion Division regular season champion Division regular season and conference tournament champion Conference tournament champion

== See also ==
- List of College Football Hall of Fame inductees (players, A–K)
- List of Vanderbilt University athletes

== Bibliography ==
- Southern Conference (2009). 2009 Southern Conference Football Media Guide (PDF). Archived from the original (PDF) on February 20, 2012.
- University of Florida (2012). 2012 Florida Football Media Guide (PDF). Gainesville, Florida: University Athletic Association. Archived from the original (PDF) on May 27, 2013.
- Vanderbilt University (1922). The Commodore.
- Bynum, Mike (1998). The Gainesville Sun Presents The Greatest Moments in Florida Gators Football. Champaign, Illinois: Sports Publishing, Inc. ISBN 1-57167-196-X.
- Carlson, Norm (2007). University of Florida Football Vault: The History of the Florida Gators. Atlanta, Georgia: Whitman Publishing, LLC. ISBN 978-0-7948-2298-9.
- McCarthy, Kevin M. (2000). Fightin' Gators: A History of University of Florida Football. Mount Pleasant, South Carolina: Arcadia Publishing. ISBN 978-0-7385-0559-6.
- McEwen, Tom (1974). The Gators: A Story of Florida Football. Huntsville, Alabama: The Strode Publishers. ISBN 0-87397-025-X.
- Pope, Edwin (1955). Football's Greatest Coaches.
- Traughber, Bill (2011). Vanderbilt Football: Tales of Commodore Gridiron History. The History Press. ISBN 978-1-60949-423-0.
- Walsh, Christopher J. (July 18, 2006). Where Football Is King: A History of the SEC. Taylor Trade Publishing. ISBN 9781461734772.
- Wilder, Robert E. (2011). Gridiron Glory Days: Football at Mercer, 1892–1942. Mercer University Press. ISBN 9780881462678.
- Woodruff, Fuzzy (1928). A History of Southern Football 1890–1928. Vol. 2.
