= 1922 Southern Intercollegiate men's basketball tournament =

1922 Southern Conference men's basketball tournament
- Classification: Division I
- Teams: 26
- Site: Municipal Auditorium; Atlanta, GA
- Champions: North Carolina Tar Heels (1st title)
- Top scorer: George Harmon (Mercer) (75 points)

The 1922 Southern Intercollegiate men's basketball tournament took place between teams of both the Southern Conference and Southern Intercollegiate Athletic Association from February 24–March 1, 1922, at Municipal Auditorium in Atlanta, Georgia. The North Carolina Tar Heels won their first Southern Conference title.

== Bracket ==
First Round
Georgia Tech	34
Mississippi A&M	30
Furman	30
Chattanooga	57
Tulane	31
Clemson	20
Mercer	32
Centre	27
Georgetown	21
Kentucky	42
North Carolina	35
Samford	22
Auburn	32
Newberry	21
Oglethorpe	12
Georgia	43
Vanderbilt	37
The Citadel	22
Mississippi College
LSU	Withdrew

Second Round
South Carolina	24
Wofford	18
Washington and Lee	Withdrew
Georgia Tech
Chattanooga	25
Tulane	21
Mercer	35
Kentucky	22
North Carolina	32
Auburn	27
Georgia	27
Vanderbilt	26
Mississippi College	18
Tennessee	19
Mississippi	Withdrew
Alabama

Quarter Finals
South Carolina	23
Georgia Tech	34
Chattanooga	18
Mercer	25
North Carolina	33
Georgia	25
Tennessee	25
Alabama	29

Semi Finals
Georgia Tech	14
Mercer	29
North Carolina	20
Alabama	11

Final
Mercer	25
North Carolina	40

* Overtime game

=== Consolation game ===
March 1

Georgia Tech 33, Alabama 25
Pts: Baby Roane 12	Pts: Slim Carter 12

Municipal Auditorium, Atlanta, Georgia
Referees: Yates

=== Championship ===
March 1

Mercer 25, North Carolina 40
Pts: George Harmon 18	Pts: Cartwright Carmichael 16

Municipal Auditorium, Atlanta, Georgia
Referees: Sutton

== All-Southern tournament team ==
Player	Position	Class	Team
Monk McDonald	G	Sophomore	North Carolina
George Harmon	G	Senior	Mercer
Cartwright Carmichael	F	Sophomore	North Carolina
Charles Wallett	F	Senior	Newberry
Bill Redd	C	Junior	Chattanooga

1921–22 Southern Conference men's basketball standings
	Conf.				Overall
Team	W		L	PCT	W		L	PCT
Virginia	5	–	0	1.000	17	–	1	.944
Alabama	6	–	1	.857	15	–	4	.789
Georgia	4	–	1	.800	10	–	5	.667
Washington and Lee	6	–	2	.750	11	–	3	.786
Kentucky	3	–	1	.750	10	–	6	.625
Auburn	2	–	1	.667	5	–	6	.455
North Carolina †	3	–	3	.500	15	–	6	.714
Virginia Tech	2	–	2	.500	14	–	6	.700
Georgia Tech	2	–	3	.400	11	–	6	.647
Tennessee	1	–	3	.250	12	–	7	.632
NC State	1	–	5	.167	6	–	13	.316
Clemson	0	–	3	.000	8	–	13	.381
Mississippi A&M	0	–	4	.000	12	–	10	.545
† Southern Intercollegiate Tournament winner

== See also ==
- List of Southern Conference men's basketball champions
