= 1915–16 North Carolina Tar Heels men's basketball team =

American college basketball season

1915–16 North Carolina Tar Heels men's basketball
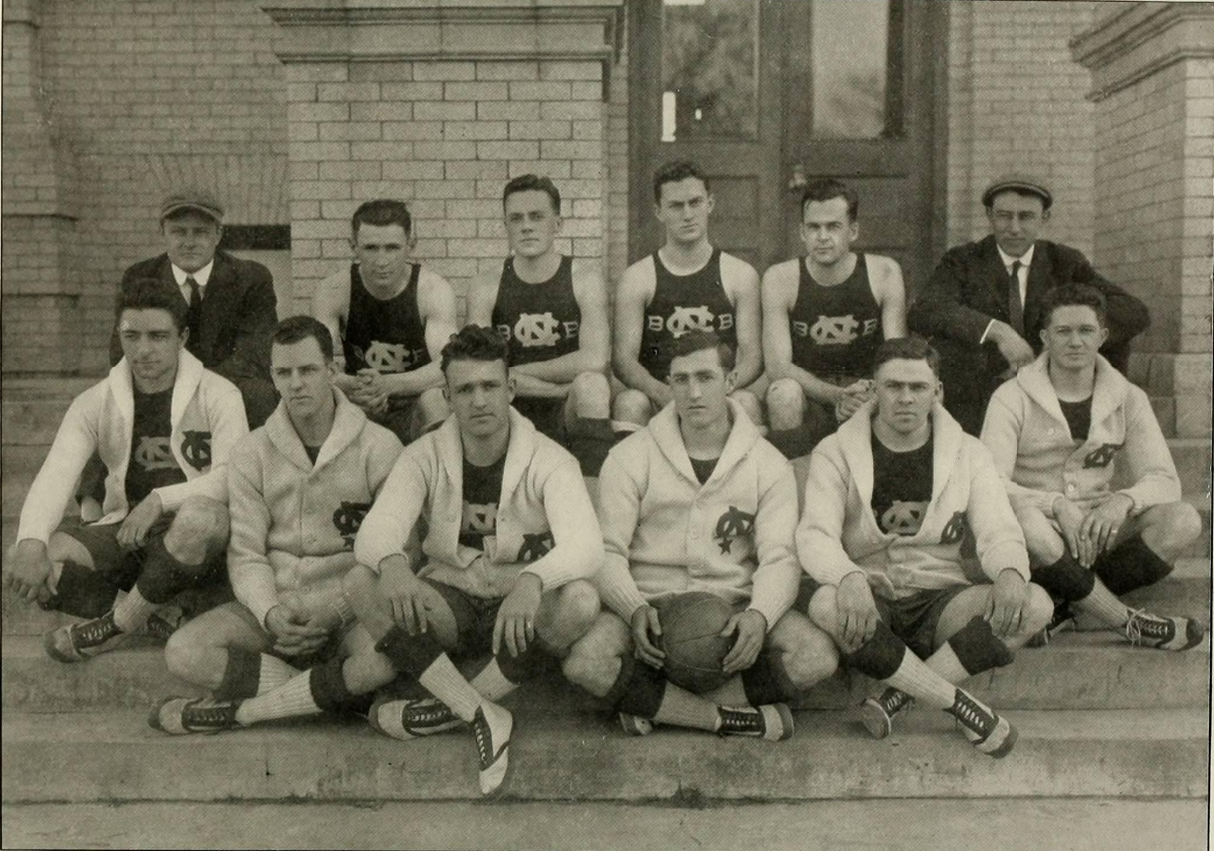
- Conference: Independent
- Record: 12–6
- Head coach: Charles Doak (2nd season)
- Captain: John Johnson
- Home arena: Bynum Gymnasium

The 1915–16 North Carolina Tar Heels men's basketball team (variously "North Carolina", "Carolina" or "Tar Heels") was the sixth varsity college basketball team to represent the University of North Carolina. (Note: The school was known as the University of North Carolina until February 1963.)

== Roster and schedule ==
1915–16 North Carolina Tar Heels roster
Name	Position	Year	Hometown
Ezra Andrews	G	Sophomore	Charlotte, North Carolina
James "Zeke" Cowan	C	Senior	Asheville, North Carolina
Robert "Rusty" Davis	G	Junior	Wilmington, North Carolina
Owen Fitzsimmons	C	Freshman	Charlotte, North Carolina
Clement "Clem" Holding	C	Sophomore	Raleigh, North Carolina
Roy Homewood	G	Senior	Burlington, North Carolina
John Johnson	F	Junior	Lynchburg, Virginia
Frank Kendrick		Junior	Dillon, South Carolina (Note: Kendrick's hometown is listed as Charlotte, North Carolina in the Carolina Basketball 2018-19 Facts & Records Book, while the Yackety Yack lists it as Dillon, South Carolina.)
Giles Mebane "Meb" Long	F	Senior	Charlotte, North Carolina
Moulton Massey			Princeton, North Carolina
Fred Patterson		Pharmacy (Note: Fred Marion Patterson is listed as a "Special Pharmacy Student" in the Yackety Yack.)	Concord, North Carolina
Boyce Scruggs		1st Year Pharmacy (Note: The Yackety Yack lists Boyce Pickney Scruggs as a member of the first year Pharmacy class.)	Rutherfordton, North Carolina
Carlyle Shepard	F	Freshman	Wilmington, North Carolina
George "Yank" Tandy	C	Junior	Jacksonville, Illinois
Charles Gaillard "Buzz" Tennent	F	Sophomore	Asheville, North Carolina
George "Raby" Tennent	G	Junior	Asheville, North Carolina

Schedule
Date time, TV	Opponent	Result	Record	Site city, state
Regular season
December 15, 1915*	Durham Y.M.C.A.	L 16–26	0–1	Bynum Gymnasium; Chapel Hill, North Carolina
December 17, 1915*	at Durham Y.M.C.A.	W 18–14	1–1	Durham, North Carolina
January 10, 1916*	Elon	W 31–10	2–1	Bynum Gymnasium; Chapel Hill, North Carolina
January 13, 1916*	Statesville Y.M.C.A. (Note: The team is listed as the "Statesville YMCA" in the Carolina Basketball 2018-19 Facts & Records Book, while the Yackety Yack lists it as "Statesville A.C.")	W 51–14	3–1	Bynum Gymnasium; Chapel Hill, North Carolina
January 15, 1916*	vs. Wake Forest	L 22–27	3–2	Raleigh, North Carolina
February 3, 1916*	Maryville	W 39–24	4–2	Bynum Gymnasium; Chapel Hill, North Carolina
February 7, 1916*	vs. Virginia	L 24–30 (Note: The score is listed as 24–30 in the Carolina Basketball 2018-19 Facts & Records Book, while the Yackety Yack lists score as 25–29.)	4–3	Richmond, Virginia
February 8, 1916*	at Virginia Tech	L 27–44	4–4	
February 9, 1916*	at Roanoke	L 13–45	4–5	
February 10, 1916*	at Randolph–Macon	W 47–18	5–5	
February 11, 1916*	at Washington and Lee	L 18–25	5–6	
February 12, 1916*	at VMI	W 25–23 ^{OT}	6–6	Lexington, Virginia
February 16, 1916*	Davidson	W 20–14	7–6	Bynum Gymnasium; Chapel Hill, North Carolina
February 19, 1916*	at Elon	W 19–15	8–6	
February 24, 1916*	at Guilford	W 51–21	9–6	
February 25, 1916*	vs. Davidson	W 31–21	10–6	Statesville, North Carolina
February 26, 1915*	at Statesville Y.M.C.A.	W 34–30	11–6	
March 2, 1916*	Guilford	W 40–26	12–6	Bynum Gymnasium; Chapel Hill, North Carolina
*Non-conference game. ^{#}Rankings from AP Poll. (#) Tournament seedings in parentheses. All times are in Eastern Time.
