= 1922–23 University of Virginia men's basketball team =

American college basketball season

1922–23 University of Virginia men's basketball
- Conference: Southern Conference
- Head coach: Henry Lannigan (18th season)
- Home arena: Fayerweather Gymnasium

1922–23 Southern Conference men's basketball standings
	Conf.				Overall
Team	W		L	PCT	W		L	PCT
North Carolina	5	–	0	1.000	15	–	1	.938
Vanderbilt	2	–	0	1.000	16	–	8	.667
Tulane	5	–	1	.833	15	–	3	.833
Tennessee	3	–	1	.750	15	–	2	.882
Mississippi A&M†	8	–	3	.727	15	–	4	.789
Washington and Lee	4	–	2	.667	7	–	8	.467
Georgia Tech	5	–	3	.625	9	–	9	.500
Alabama	3	–	3	.500	20	–	5	.800
Clemson	3	–	3	.500	11	–	6	.647
Georgia	3	–	3	.500	11	–	8	.579
Auburn	2	–	3	.400	7	–	7	.500
Mississippi	2	–	4	.333	8	–	7	.533
Virginia Tech	1	–	2	.333	13	–	6	.684
NC State	1	–	2	.333	5	–	8	.385
Virginia	1	–	3	.250	12	–	5	.706
South Carolina	0	–	3	.000	6	–	13	.316
Florida	0	–	3	.000	2	–	5	.286
Kentucky	0	–	5	.000	3	–	10	.231
LSU	0	–	6	.000	10	–	10	.500
† Southern Intercollegiate Tournament winner As of April 30, 1923

The 1922–23 University of Virginia men's basketball team represented the University of Virginia during the 1922–23 NCAA men's basketball season. The team was led by eighteenth-year head coach Henry Lannigan, and played their home games at Fayerweather Gymnasium in Charlottesville, Virginia. Now known as the Virginia Cavaliers, the team did not have an official nickname prior to 1923.

== Schedule ==
Date time, TV	Opponent	Result	Record	Site city, state
Regular season
January 11* no, no	Randolph–Macon	W 42–8 ^{42–8}	1–0 (0–0)	Fayerweather Gymnasium; Charlottesville, VA
January 13* no, no	Roanoke	W 50–17 ^{50–17}	2–0 (0–0)	Fayerweather Gymnasium; Charlottesville, VA
January 15* no, no	Hampden-Sydney	W 31–16 ^{31–16}	3–0 (0–0)	Fayerweather Gymnasium; Charlottesville, VA
January 20* no, no	William & Mary	W 35–19 ^{35–19}	4–0 (0–0)	Fayerweather Gymnasium; Charlottesville, VA
January 27* no, no	Lynchburg	W 43–28 ^{43–28}	5–0 (0–0)	Fayerweather Gymnasium; Charlottesville, VA
January 29* no, no	Richmond	W 32–21 ^{32–21}	6–0 (0–0)	Fayerweather Gymnasium; Charlottesville, VA
February 1 no, no	at Washington and Lee	L 19–29 ^{19–29}	6–1 (0–1)	Lexington, VA
February 3* no, no	vs. VMI	W 20–8 ^{20–8}	7–1 (0–1)	Roanoke, VA
February 5* no, no	West Virginia	L 14–17 ^{14–17}	7–2 (0–1)	Fayerweather Gymnasium; Charlottesville, VA
February 7* no, no	WV Wesleyan	W 28–22 ^{28–22}	8–2 (0–1)	Fayerweather Gymnasium; Charlottesville, VA
February 8* no, no	Catholic	W 29–28 ^{29–28}	9–2 (0–1)	Fayerweather Gymnasium; Charlottesville, VA
February 10* no, no	Duke	W 28–25 ^{28–25}	10–2 (0–1)	Fayerweather Gymnasium; Charlottesville, VA
February 12* no, no	George Washington	W 26–13 ^{26–13}	11–2 (0–1)	Fayerweather Gymnasium; Charlottesville, VA
February 20 no, no	Washington and Lee	W 26–17 ^{26–17}	12–2 (1–1)	Fayerweather Gymnasium; Charlottesville, VA
February 22 no, no	vs. Virginia Tech	L 18–22 ^{18–22}	12–3 (1–2)	Lynchburg, VA
February 23* no, no	at Duke	L 24–37 ^{24–37}	12–4 (1–2)	The Arc; Durham, NC
February 24 no, no	at North Carolina	L 16–39 ^{16–39}	12–5 (1–3)	Bynum Gymnasium; Chapel Hill, NC
*Non-conference game. (#) Tournament seedings in parentheses. All times are in Eastern Time.
