= Ron Shumate =

American basketball coach

Biographical details
- Born: September 21, 1939 (age 87)

Playing career

Baseball
- 1961: Johnson City Cardinals
- 1964: Winnipeg Goldeyes
- Positions: Third baseman, Second baseman, and outfielder

Coaching career (HC unless noted)

Men's basketball
- 1964–1967: Rockwood HS (TN)
- 1967–1968: Harriman HS (TN)
- 1969–1970: Niceville HS (FL)
- 1970–1972: Chattanooga (assistant)
- 1972–1979: Chattanooga
- 1981–1997: Southeast Missouri State
- 2004–2007: Soddy Daisy HS (TN)

Head coaching record
- Overall: 445–232 (NCAA); 167–75 (high school)

Accomplishments and honors

Championships
- NCAA Division II men's basketball tournament (1977)

Awards
- NABC Division II Coach of the Year (1977)

Ronald Earl Shumate (born September 21, 1939) is an American basketball coach who was the head coach of the Chattanooga Mocs men's basketball team from 1972 to 1979 and the Southeast Missouri State Indians men's basketball team from 1981 to 1997.

== Athletics ==
Shumate played baseball and basketball at Portsmouth High School and Tennessee Polytechnic Institute. In 1961, he played for the Johnson City Cardinals of the Appalachian League. In 54 games, he batted .322 with five home runs and 32 RBIs. He then spent two years in the United States Navy. In 1964, he appeared in 16 games for the Winnipeg Goldeyes, a minor league affiliate of the St. Louis Cardinals. He batted .077 with 2 stolen bases.

== Coaching ==
Shumate began his coaching career at Rockwood High School in Rockwood, Tennessee. In three seasons, his teams compiled a 71–19 record. He then moved to nearby Harriman High School, where he had a 10–16 record in his only season as head coach. Shumate returned to Tennessee Tech to earn his master's degree, then resumed his coaching career at Niceville High School in Niceville, Florida in 1969. His assistant was future college basketball head coach Cliff Ellis.

In 1970, Shumate became an assistant to Leon Ford at Chattanooga. He was promoted to head coach in 1972. Over seven seasons, Shumate's teams had an 139–61 record and appeared in the NCAA Division II men's basketball tournament four times. Chattanooga was runner-up in the 1976 NCAA Division II basketball tournament and won the 1977 NCAA Division II basketball tournament. He was named NABC Division II Coach of the Year in 1977. In 1977, Chattanooga moved from Division II to Division I. Shumate resigned in 1979, citing mental and physical exhaustion. His 139 wins rank third all-time at Chattanooga and his .695 winning percentage is second only to Murray Arnold.

Shumate returned to coaching in 1981 as the head coach at Southeast Missouri State. He led SEMO to seven Mid-America Intercollegiate Athletics Association championships (1982, 1983, 1985, 1986, 1988, 1989, and 1990) and two appearances in the NCAA Division II national championship game (1986 and 1989). In 1988, Shumate was named NCAA Division II National Coach of the Year by Basketball Times. In 1991, SEMO moved from Division II to Division I. The Indians struggled at the Division I level, going 71–95 in their first six seasons. Shumate was fired on May 15, 1997, amid an NCAA investigation. Shumate is the winningest men's basketball coach in SEMO history with an overall record of 306–171.

Shumate remained out of coaching until 2004, when he became the head boy's basketball coach at Soddy Daisy High School in Soddy-Daisy, Tennessee. He amassed a 57–36 record over three seasons before retiring.
