= 1922–23 Georgia Bulldogs basketball team =

American college basketball team season

1922–23 Georgia Bulldogs basketball
- Conference: Southern Conference
- Record: 11–8 (3–3 SoCon)
- Head coach: Herman Stegeman (4th season)
- Captain: Ed Gurr

1922–23 Southern Conference men's basketball standings
	Conf.				Overall
Team	W		L	PCT	W		L	PCT
North Carolina	5	–	0	1.000	15	–	1	.938
Vanderbilt	2	–	0	1.000	16	–	8	.667
Tulane	5	–	1	.833	15	–	3	.833
Tennessee	3	–	1	.750	15	–	2	.882
Mississippi A&M†	8	–	3	.727	15	–	4	.789
Washington and Lee	4	–	2	.667	7	–	8	.467
Georgia Tech	5	–	3	.625	9	–	9	.500
Alabama	3	–	3	.500	20	–	5	.800
Clemson	3	–	3	.500	11	–	6	.647
Georgia	3	–	3	.500	11	–	8	.579
Auburn	2	–	3	.400	7	–	7	.500
Mississippi	2	–	4	.333	8	–	7	.533
Virginia Tech	1	–	2	.333	13	–	6	.684
NC State	1	–	2	.333	5	–	8	.385
Virginia	1	–	3	.250	12	–	5	.706
South Carolina	0	–	3	.000	6	–	13	.316
Florida	0	–	3	.000	2	–	5	.286
Kentucky	0	–	5	.000	3	–	10	.231
LSU	0	–	6	.000	10	–	10	.500
† Southern Intercollegiate Tournament winner

The 1922–23 Georgia Bulldogs basketball team represented the University of Georgia as a member of the Southern Conference (SoCon) during the 1922–23 NCAA men's basketball season. Led by fourth-year head coach Herman Stegeman, the Bulldogs compiled an overall record of 11–8 with a mark of 3–3 in conference play, placing in a three-way tie for eighth in the SoCon. The team captain was Ed Gurr.

== Roster ==
1922–23 Georgia Bulldogs men's basketball team
Players
Coaches

Pos.	#	Name	Height	Weight	Year	Previous school	Hometown
		Ralph Williams	—	—
		Jake Butler	—	—
		Ed Gurr	—	—
		George Clark	—	—
		Joe Bennett	—	—
		Robert Richardson	—	—

Head coach

Herman Stegeman

Assistant coach(es)

Legend

- (C) Team captain
- (S) Suspended
- (I) Ineligible
- (W) Walk-on
- Injured
- Current redshirt

== Schedule ==
Date time, TV	Opponent	Result	Record	Site city, state
12/31/1922	at Savannah YMCA	W 29-22	1–0	Savannah, GA
1/1/1923	at Jax YMCA	W 30-27	2–0	Jacksonville, GA
1/2/1923	at Albany YMCA	L 21-31	2–1	Albany, GA
1/3/1923	at Camp Benning	L 17-25	2–2	
1/11/1923	at Clemson	W 29-20	3–2	Clemson, SC
1/12/1923	at Furman	W 48-28	4–2	Greenville, SC
1/13/1923	at Wofford	W 24-22	5–2	Spartanburg, SC
1/24/1923	at Wofford	W 45-28	6–2	Spartanburg, SC
1/27/1923	Auburn	W 35-29	7–2	Athens, GA
2/1/1923	at Vanderbilt	L 16-25	7–3	Nashville, TN
2/2/1923	at Tennessee	L 26-30	7–4	Knoxville, TN
2/3/1923	at Kentucky	W 23-19	8–4	Lexington, KY
2/9/1923	at Auburn	L 16-45	8–5	Auburn, AL
2/10/1923	at A.A.C.	W 34-30	9–5	
2/16/1923	at Mercer	L 11-31	9–6	Macon, GA
2/17/1923	at Mercer	W 29-28	10–6	Macon, GA
2/22/1923	A.A.C.	L 25-30	10–7	Athens, GA
2/27/1923	Tennessee	W 23-19	11–7	Athens, GA
2/28/1923	Georgia Tech	L 22-27	11–8	Athens, GA
*Non-conference game. (#) Tournament seedings in parentheses.
