= 1924 College Basketball All-Southern Team =

The 1924 College Basketball All-Southern Team consisted of basketball players from the South chosen at their respective positions.

== All-Southerns ==
=== Guards ===
- Monk McDonald, North Carolina (MB)
- K. P. Gatchell, Mississippi A&M (MB)

=== Forwards ===
- Jack Cobb, North Carolina (MB)
- Cartwright Carmichael, North Carolina (MB)

=== Center ===
- Slim Carter, Alabama (MB)

== Key ==
- MB = selected by Morgan Blake in the Atlanta Journal.
