= 1977 NCAA Division II basketball tournament =

Edition of USA college basketball tournament

- Teams: 32
- Finals site: , Springfield, Massachusetts
- Champions: Chattanooga Mocs (1st title)
- Runner-up: Randolph-Macon Yellow Jackets (1st title game)
- Semifinalists: North Alabama Lions (1st Final Four); Sacred Heart Pioneers (1st Final Four)
- Winning coach: Ron Shumate (1st title)
- MOP: Wayne Golden (Chattanooga)
- Attendance: 70,776

The 1977 NCAA Division II basketball tournament involved 32 schools playing in a single-elimination tournament to determine the national champion of men's NCAA Division II college basketball as a culmination of the 1976–77 NCAA Division II men's basketball season. It was won by the University of Tennessee at Chattanooga and Chattanooga's Wayne Golden was the Most Outstanding Player.

1977 NCAA Division II Men's sites - regionals (cyan) Quarterfinals (orange) Final Four (red)

== Regional participants ==
School	Outcome
Baltimore	Runner-up
Towson	Regional Champion
Virginia Union	Third Place
Winston-Salem	Fourth Place

School	Outcome
Assumption	Third Place
Bridgeport	Fourth Place
Merrimack	Runner-up
Sacred Heart	Regional Champion

School	Outcome
Armstrong Atlantic	Fourth Place
Chattanooga	Regional Champion
UCF	Runner-up
Valdosta State	Third Place

School	Outcome
Augustana (SD)	Fourth Place
Green Bay	Runner-up
Nebraska–Omaha	Third Place
North Dakota	Regional Champion

School	Outcome
Bellarmine	Fourth Place
Eastern Illinois	Runner-up
Randolph-Macon	Regional Champion
Youngstown State	Third Place

School	Outcome
Cheyney	Regional Champion
Gannon	Third Place
Hartwick	Runner-up
Philadelphia Textile	Fourth Place

School	Outcome
Lincoln (MO)	Third Place
North Alabama	Regional Champion
Southern	Fourth Place
Troy State	Runner-up

School	Outcome
Cal Poly	Regional Champion
Cal State Hayward	Fourth Place
Puget Sound	Runner-up
Seattle Pacific	Third Place

*denotes tie

== Regionals ==
=== South Atlantic - Towson, Maryland ===
Location: Towson Center Host: Towson State University

Regional semifinals Round of 32; March 4
Baltimore	116
Virginia Union	96
Towson	107
Winston-Salem	83

Regional Final; Sweet 16; March 5
Baltimore	87
Towson	92*

- Third Place - Virginia Union 107, Winston-Salem 93

=== New England - Fairfield, Connecticut ===
Location: SHU Gymnasium Host: Sacred Heart University

Regional semifinals Round of 32; March 3
Merrimack	107
Bridgeport	83
Sacred Heart	83
Assumption	78

Regional Final; Sweet 16; March 4
Merrimack	104
Sacred Heart	110

- Third Place - Assumption 86, Bridgeport 84

=== South - Chattanooga, Tennessee ===
Location: Maclellan Gymnasium Host: University of Tennessee at Chattanooga

Regional semifinals Round of 32; March 4
UCF	91
Armstrong Atlantic	81
Chattanooga	92
Valdosta State	76

Regional Final; Sweet 16; March 5
UCF	79
Chattanooga	88

- Third Place - Valdosta State 83, Armstrong Atlantic 73

=== North Central - Green Bay, Wisconsin ===
Location: Brown County Veterans Memorial Arena Host: University of Wisconsin at Green Bay

Regional semifinals Round of 32; March 3
North Dakota	71
Augustana (SD)	64
Green Bay	89
Nebraska–Omaha	63

Regional Final; Sweet 16; March 4
North Dakota	45
Green Bay	43

- Third Place - Nebraska–Omaha 93, Augustana 91

=== Great Lakes - Youngstown, Ohio ===
Location: Beeghly Center Host: Youngstown State University

Regional semifinals Round of 32; March 4
Eastern Illinois	87
Bellarmine	72
Randolph–Macon	71*
Youngstown State	69

Regional Final; Sweet 16; March 5
Eastern Illinois	66
Randolph–Macon	69

- Third Place - Youngstown State 81, Bellarmine 79

=== East - Erie, Pennsylvania ===
Location: Hammermill Center Host: Gannon University

Regional semifinals Round of 32; March 4
Cheyney	62
Philadelphia Textile	58
Hartwick	68
Gannon	66

Regional Final; Sweet 16; March 5
Cheyney	88
Hartwick	61

- Third Place - Gannon 85, Philadelphia Textile 67

=== South Central - Florence, Alabama ===
Location: Flowers Hall Host: University of North Alabama

Regional semifinals Round of 32; March 4
Troy State	81
Lincoln (MO)	65
North Alabama	105
Southern	88

Regional Final; Sweet 16; March 5
Troy State	70
North Alabama	77

- Third Place - Lincoln 103, Southern 87

=== West - Tacoma, Washington ===
Location: Memorial Fieldhouse Host: University of Puget Sound

Regional semifinals Round of 32; March 3
Cal Poly	73
Seattle Pacific	58
Puget Sound	85
Cal State Hayward	68

Regional Final; Sweet 16; March 4
Cal Poly	67
Puget Sound	54

- Third Place - Seattle Pacific 94, Cal State Hayward 74

*denotes each overtime played

== National Quarterfinals ==
Quarterfinal - New Haven, CT; Elite Eight; March 12
Towson	82
Sacred Heart	85

Quarterfinal - Grand Forks, ND; Elite Eight; March 11
Chattanooga	76
North Dakota	52

Quarterfinal - Richmond, VA; Elite Eight; March 13
Randolph-Macon	65
Cheyney	63

Quarterfinal - Florence, AL; Elite Eight; March 11
North Alabama	67*
Cal Poly	64

== National Finals - Springfield, Massachusetts ==
Location: Springfield Civic Center Hosts: American International College and Springfield College

National semifinals Final Four; March 16
Sacred Heart	81
Chattanooga	95
Randolph-Macon	82
North Alabama	67

National Championship; March 17
Chattanooga	71
Randolph-Macon	62

- Third Place - North Alabama 93, Sacred Heart 77

*denotes each overtime played

== All-tournament team ==
- Joe Allen (Randolph-Macon)
- Otis Boddie (North Alabama)
- Wayne Golden (Tennessee-Chattanooga)
- William Gordon (Tennessee-Chattanooga)
- Hector Olivencia (Sacred Heart)

== See also ==
- 1977 NCAA Division I basketball tournament
- 1977 NCAA Division III basketball tournament
- 1977 NAIA Basketball Tournament

== Sources ==
- 2010 NCAA Men's Basketball Championship Tournament Records and Statistics: Division II men's basketball Championship
- 1977 NCAA Division II men's basketball tournament jonfmorse.com
