= 1921–22 University of Virginia men's basketball team =

American college basketball season

1921–22 University of Virginia men's basketball

Southern Conference Regular Season Champions
- Conference: Southern Conference
- Record: 17–1 (5–0 SoCon)
- Head coach: Henry Lannigan (17th season)
- Home arena: Fayerweather Gymnasium

1921–22 Southern Conference men's basketball standings
	Conf.				Overall
Team	W		L	PCT	W		L	PCT
Virginia	5	–	0	1.000	17	–	1	.944
Alabama	6	–	1	.857	15	–	4	.789
Georgia	4	–	1	.800	10	–	5	.667
Washington and Lee	6	–	2	.750	11	–	3	.786
Kentucky	3	–	1	.750	10	–	6	.625
Auburn	2	–	1	.667	5	–	6	.455
North Carolina†	3	–	3	.500	15	–	6	.714
Virginia Tech	2	–	2	.500	14	–	6	.700
Georgia Tech	2	–	3	.400	11	–	6	.647
Tennessee	1	–	3	.250	12	–	7	.632
NC State	1	–	5	.167	6	–	13	.316
Clemson	0	–	3	.000	8	–	13	.381
Mississippi A&M	0	–	4	.000	12	–	10	.545
† Southern Intercollegiate Tournament winner As of April 30, 1922

The 1921–22 University of Virginia men's basketball team represented the University of Virginia during the 1921–22 NCAA men's basketball season. The team was led by seventeenth-year head coach Henry Lannigan, and played their home games at Fayerweather Gymnasium in Charlottesville, Virginia. Now known as the Virginia Cavaliers, the team did not have an official nickname prior to 1923.

== Schedule ==
Date time, TV	Opponent	Result	Record	Site city, state
Regular season
January 11* no, no	Lynchburg	W 47–22	1–0	Fayerweather Gymnasium; Charlottesville, VA
January 14* no, no	Randolph–Macon	W 58–16	2–0	Fayerweather Gymnasium; Charlottesville, VA
January 17* no, no	Roanoke	W 40–20	3–0	Fayerweather Gymnasium; Charlottesville, VA
January 19* no, no	William & Mary	W 35–20	4–0	Fayerweather Gymnasium; Charlottesville, VA
January 23* no, no	Richmond	W 28–21	5–0	Fayerweather Gymnasium; Charlottesville, VA
January 26* no, no	Elon	W 42–16	6–0	Fayerweather Gymnasium; Charlottesville, VA
February 2 no, no	Tennessee	W 31–20	7–0 (1–0)	Fayerweather Gymnasium; Charlottesville, VA
February 4* no, no	at VMI	W 25–23	8–0 (1–0)	Lexington, VA
February 9* no, no	at Catholic University	L 16–37	8–1 (1–0)	Washington, DC
February 10* no, no	at Gallaudet	W 33–25	9–1 (1–0)	Washington, DC
February 11* no, no	at George Washington	W 19–16	10–1 (1–0)	Washington, DC
February 13 no, no	Kentucky	W 32–30 ^{OT}	11–1 (2–0)	Fayerweather Gymnasium; Charlottesville, VA
February 14* no, no	at Lynchburg Elks	W 39–31	12–1 (2–0)	Lynchburg, VA
February 18* no, no	VMI	W 34–17	13–1 (2–0)	Fayerweather Gymnasium; Charlottesville, VA
February 20 no, no	North Carolina	W 31–29	14–1 (3–0)	Fayerweather Gymnasium; Charlottesville, VA
December 30 no, no	vs. Virginia Tech	W 26–22 ^{OT}	15–1 (4–0)	Roanoke, VA
December 30 no, no	Washington and Lee	W 35–25	16–1 (5–0)	Fayerweather Gymnasium; Charlottesville, VA
December 30* no, no	Guilford	W 35–16	17–1 (5–0)	Fayerweather Gymnasium; Charlottesville, VA
*Non-conference game. (#) Tournament seedings in parentheses. All times are in Eastern Time.
