= K. P. Gatchell =

American basketball player and coach (1901–1972)

Personal information
- Born: September 3, 1901 Clinton, Illinois, U.S.
- Died: June 29, 1972 (aged 70) Columbus, Mississippi, U.S.
- Listed height: 6 ft 2 in (1.88 m)
- Listed weight: 200 lb (91 kg)
- Position: Guard

Career history

Playing
- 1922–1924: Mississippi State

Coaching
- 1925: Mississippi State
- 1931–1933: Ole Miss (assistant)

Career highlights
- 2× All-Southern (1923, 1924)

Kenneth Porter Gatchell (September 3, 1901 – June 29, 1972) was an American college basketball player and coach. He was twice an All-Southern guard for the Mississippi Aggies, leading them to the 1923 SoCon tournament title. He was also a center on the football team, and All-American in the discus. He later coached basketball at his alma mater, posting a 14–9 record. He was inducted into the Mississippi Sports Hall of Fame in 1966. He was 6'2" 200 pounds.
