= Soddy Daisy High School =

Public high school in Soddy-Daisy, Tennessee, United States

Location
- 618 Sequoyah Access Rd; Soddy-Daisy, Hamilton County, Tennessee 37379; United States; 35.235°N 85.180°W

Information
- Established: 1937
- Staff: 71.73 (FTE)
- Gender: Coeducational
- Enrollment: 1,118 (2023–2024)
- Student to teacher ratio: 15.59
- Colors: Blue; Gold
- Mascot: Trojan
- Website: https://sdhs.hcde.org/

Soddy Daisy High School is a public high school located in Soddy-Daisy, Tennessee that is part of the Hamilton County Schools district. Originally, the towns of Soddy and Daisy each had its own high schools. In 1937, a comprehensive school was built between the two towns on Old Dayton Pike and the names of the towns were combined to name the school. The current building, at 618 Sequoyah Access Road, was opened in 1983. A round gymnasium was built many years after the old school and still stands on the original site. It serves as a wrestling arena for the present school. A memorial built from the bricks of the old school is located on the current high school grounds.

In 2010, the school was the subject of a complaint from the Freedom From Religion Foundation about the school's practice of Christian school prayers at football games and other public events.

The mascot of Soddy Daisy High School is a "Trojan" selected by the senior class of 1940 over the "Rams".

== Notable alumni ==
- Kane Brown, singer
- Buck Varner, professional baseball player
