= Chuck Wollet =

College basketball player (1899–1957)

Personal information
- Born: April 26, 1899 Youngstown, Ohio, US
- Died: November 26, 1957 (aged 58) Griffin, Georgia, US

Career information
- College: Newberry
- Position: Forward, Center

Career history
- 1922–1924: Newberry

Career highlights
- All-Southern (1922); Newberry Hall of Fame

Charles Elmer Wollet (26 April 1899 – 26 November 1957) was an All-Southern college basketball player for the Newberry Indians under legendary coach Dutch MacLean. Wollet was considered the best basketball player from the state of South Carolina. Under MacLean, Newberry won four state championships in a row. Wollet additionally played football and baseball, winning 12 letters. Coach Billy Laval of Furman awarded him a medal as the best athlete and scholar in South Carolina. Wollet married Nancy Elizabeth Fox in June 1926.

Wollet coached high school athletics and taught science in Georgia, in the cities of Statesboro, Griffin, and Union Point. He died of a heart attack at his home in Griffin. He was inducted into his Newberry's hall of fame in 1979.
