= Baby Roane =

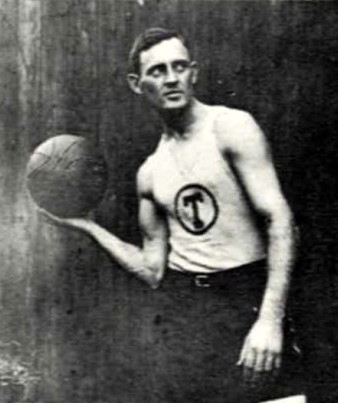

Personal information
- Born: September 26, 1901; Atlanta, Georgia
- Died: October 12, 1959 (aged 58); Chattanooga, Tennessee

Career information
- College: Georgia Tech (1921–1923)
- Position: Forward/guard

Career highlights
- All-Southern (1922, 1923)

Robert Watson "Babe" "Baby" Roane (September 26, 1901 – October 12, 1959) was a college basketball player for the Georgia Tech Yellow Jackets, known as Tech's first basketball star. Later in life he was superintendent of Davenport Hosiery Mills in Chattanooga, Tennessee.

== Georgia Tech ==
Tech's first basketball star entered school in 1920, and played with the freshmen in 1921, until coach Bill Alexander inserted him to boost the strength of his varsity team. He played forward and guard. He was All-Southern in 1922 and 1923. Roane was captain of the 1923-24 team. He was inducted into the Georgia Tech Hall of Fame in 1971.

One account reads "Roane is small in stature, but his ability to dribble, pass, and handle the ball eliminates the handicap. He is a dead shot if given half a chance, and is one of the greatest floormen in the south."
