= Bynum Hall =

Historic building at the University of North Carolina at Chapel Hill

- Bynum Gymnasium
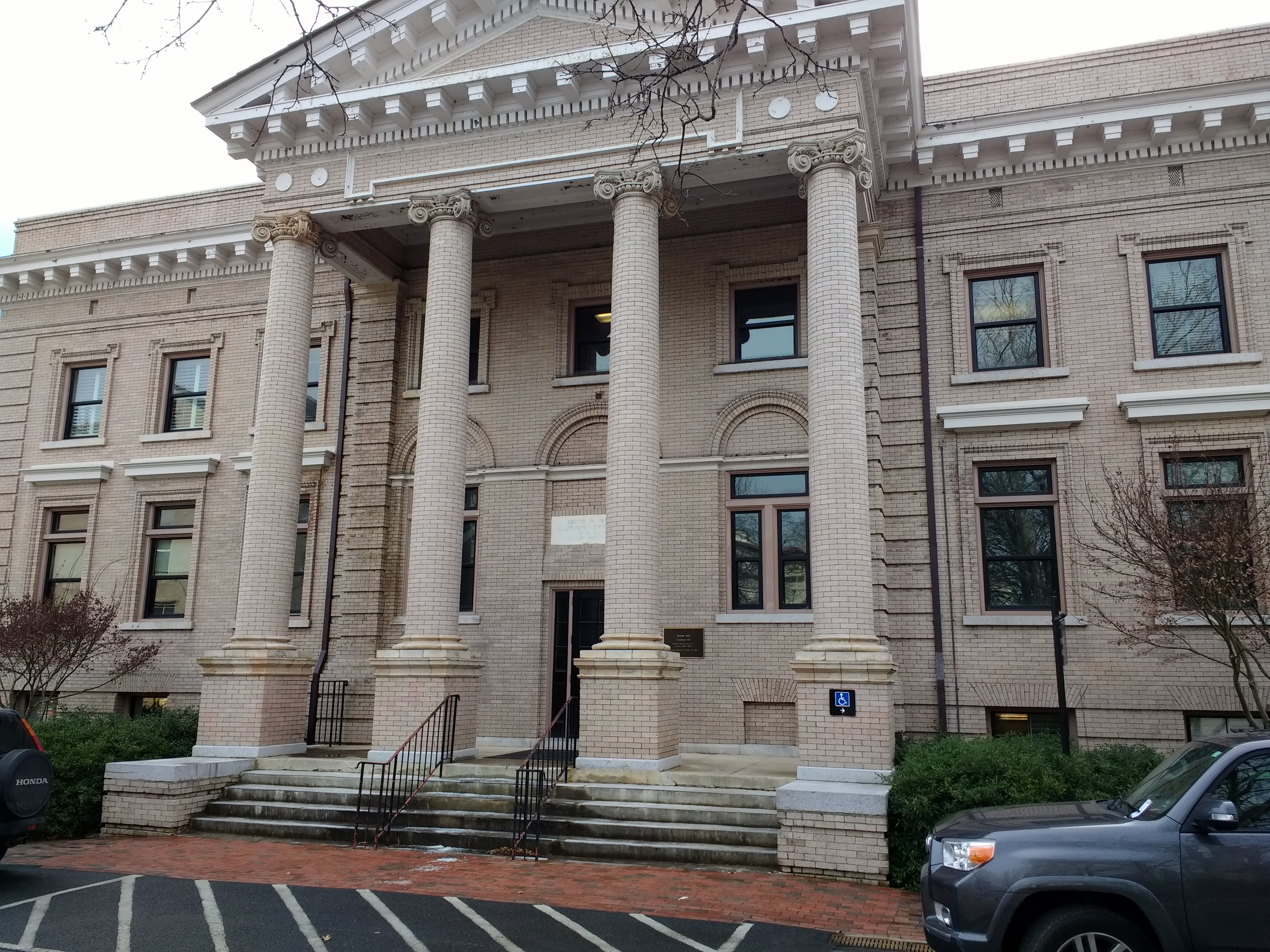
- Interactive map of Bynum Hall
- Full name: William Preston Bynum, Jr. Hall
- Location: 222 East Cameron Avenue Chapel Hill, North Carolina, U.S.
- Coordinates: 35°54′42″N 79°2′59″W
- Owner: University of North Carolina at Chapel Hill
- Capacity: N/A
- Field size: 111 by 77 feet (34 by 23 m)

Construction
- Opened: 1904
- Renovated: 1923, 1938, 1960, 1965
- Closed: Converted to office space in 1939
- Cost: $25,000
- Architects: Frank P. Milburn (1904); Atwood and Weeks (1939); Gudger, Baber, and Wood (1964)
- General contractors: V.P. Loftis (1939); Delta Construction Company (1964)

Tenants
- North Carolina Tar Heels (NCAA); Men's basketball (1910–1923)

Bynum Hall (formerly Bynum Gymnasium) is the current home of the University of North Carolina at Chapel Hill Graduate Admissions office and was the first home of North Carolina Tar Heels men's basketball team. At an executive meeting on October 2, 1903, school President Francis Preston Venable announced that former North Carolina Supreme Court justice William Preston Bynum donated $25,000 to have a gymnasium built in honor of his grandson who was a student at the university and had died due to typhoid fever. Architect Frank P. Milburn drafted plans for the structure, which were then approved by Bynum and the university's board of trustees. The building was designed to have a Greek architecture influence and had three stories with an above-ground basement. It originally contained a swimming pool, gymnasium, office spaces, and other rooms for various sports like boxing and fencing. The building started construction by June 1904 and was completed by February 1905.

Upon opening, the pool was reportedly very cold, prompting water boilers to be added later in the year. The building was formally presented during commencement in May 1905. The gym was placed into control of Dr. Robert Lawson, a skilled gymnast and the former coach of the school's baseball team. The gymnasium served as a venue for various school dances. Bynum Gym hosted the gymnastics team and later the men's basketball team, which formed in late 1910 and had its first game in the venue on January 27, 1911. The Tar Heels played thirteen seasons in Bynum Gym before moving to the Tin Can. After the basketball team's departure, Bynum was still used by students for activities; however, the pool was closed in 1924 due to having an inadequate filtration system. Following a renovation in 1938 that added a third floor, the journalism department and the University News Bureau moved into the building, sharing the building with the University Press that had occupied the basement. Over the years the journalism department moved out, some rooms were used as classrooms or storage. The building now serves as an administration building that includes the Dean of Graduate Studies and university counsel.

== Background and construction ==
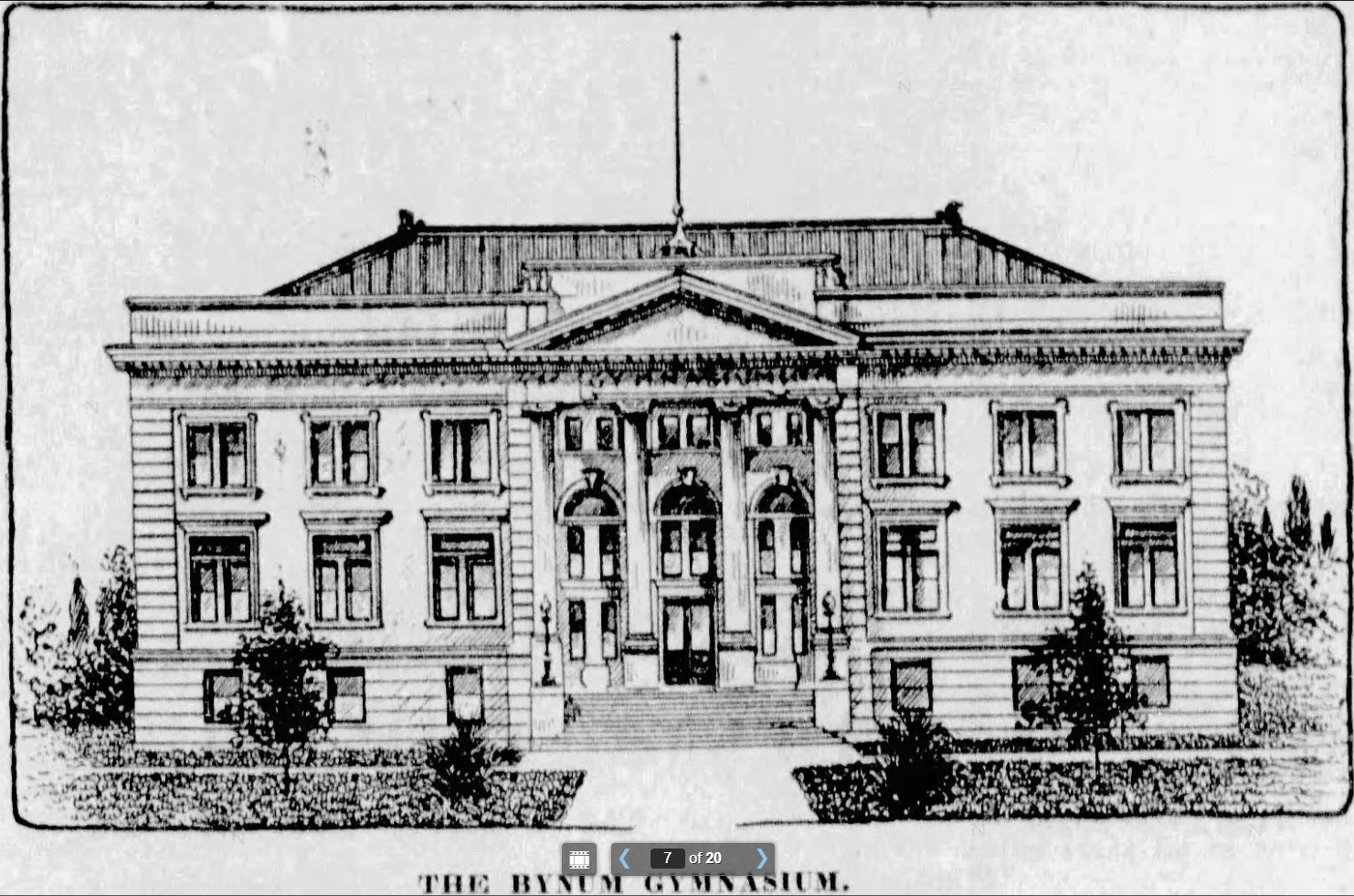
A sketch of the proposed Bynum Gymnasium from a 1904 edition of The Charlotte Observer

On October 2, 1903, during an executive university committee meeting on hosted in Governor Daniel Lindsay Russell's office, school President Francis Preston Venable revealed former North Carolina Supreme Court justice William Preston Bynum donated $25,000 to the school to build a gymnasium. The donation was made in honor of Bynum's late grandson William Preston Bynum Jr., who died on vacation after becoming sick with typhoid fever before the close of his sophomore year after attending between 1889 and 1890. The building was officially announced by Dr. Eben Alexander to students in the chapel the same day to "vigorous and prolonged applause". The university had expressed desire before Bynum's donation about needing a gymnasium for faculty and students.

At the time of the plans' announcement, the location of the future gym was reported to be on top of or near an "old athletic field" near the library. Plans were to be started at once and sent to Bynum for approval so construction could begin quickly. It was hoped that construction would be completed by September 1904. At the time it was the second largest gift ever to the university at the time. Venable commented: "The University is getting along finely in every way and we are greatly cheered by Judge Bynum's gift." Architect Frank P. Milburn created plans for the building. In February 1904, President Venable announced that the building's plans had been approved by Bynum and the trustees and work would begin "at once", weather permitting. It was to be 111 by 77 feet (34 by 23 m), with three stories and an above ground basement. The building itself was created with a Greek influence and was to feature grey mottled brick and terra cotta trimmings. The roof was to be slate and the front would feature a central portico. There were to be arched openings and pilasters on the sides of the venue for the gymnasium. It was designed symmetrically and has quoins at each corner. The building included a main gymnasium floor and equipment, a swimming pool in the basement, locker rooms with eleven showers, a running track gallery that was above the gymnasium floor, a room for Swedish gymnastics, and rooms for fencing and boxing, among other amenities. In addition, there were lounges for the students and office spaces for faculty. The building was expected to be heated by a hot water system, along with electrical work for lighting. The prospect of building the new gym caused some relief with regards to first Memorial Hall, which had been hosting physical activities and suffered many broken windows. It had been modified to have a makeshift gymnasium, but lacked showers, dressing rooms, and heat.

With your permission, I have caused to be erected on the grounds of the university, a gymnasium, intended for the use and benefit of the students, and in memory of a grandson who died before his graduation at this school.

— William Preston Bynum in a letter presenting the Bynum Gymnasium to the UNC Board of Trustees

The Morning Post reported on May 10, 1904, that material for the gymnasium had arrived to campus and work was expected to be starting that week. The location of the building was an area between Smith library and the Carr building. Mr. Waring of Columbia, South Carolina was announced to be the contractor responsible for building the structure, along with building the Campus Y building concurrently. Construction was delayed in May because the company's plant for making bricks was not set up. The construction was expected to be uninterrupted during the 1904 summer. By mid-July, it was thought that the construction of the gym would be completed in the fall. An update on construction in November was published by The Evening Tribune, where it stated that the building was coming along rapidly, but the new target finish date was in February 1905. Student newspaper The Tar Heel published a column in early February 1905, where it commented on the beauty of the building and pleaded to the student body to keep it in good condition. On February 20, it was announced that the gym had been completed. The building was regarded as one of the most completely equipped gyms in the South, as well as being a "handsome" and "modern" structure.

== History ==
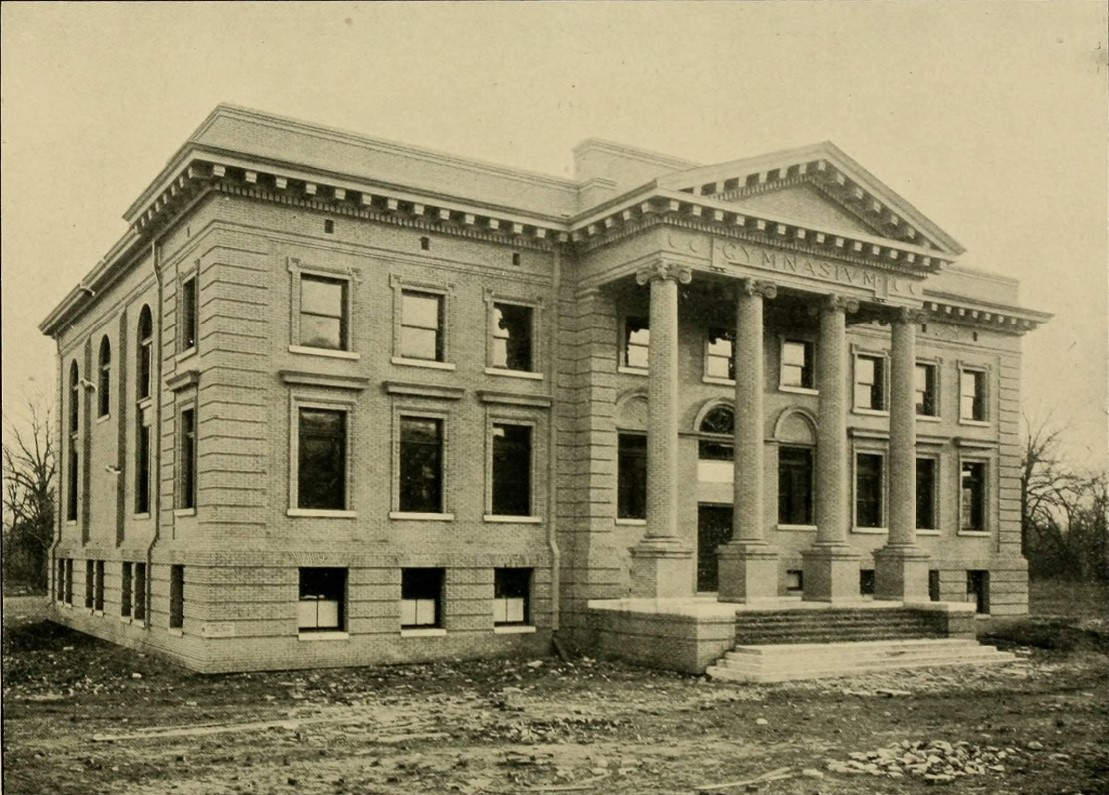
Bynum Gymnasium after its completion in 1905

Following the gym's opening, the swimming pool was filled in early April. It was reported that the first few days students used the pool, the water was freezing cold. Roughly 150 to 200 students a day would use the pool and those that utilized the pool were required to shower before and after their use. Prior to the addition of two water boilers in 1905, roughly the first 75 to use the shower would be able to get hot water.

It was announced that the building would be formally presented at the spring 1905 commencement on May 30 at noon. Bynum was unable to attend the event in part due to his age. Instead, Venable read two letters from Bynum aloud to the crowd, one in which he expressed the desire to sponsor the gymnasium and a formal letter presenting the gymnasium to the university. In addition, he explained his reasoning for choosing the University of North Carolina because "[the school] has accomplished and is accomplishing so much for the educational growth and prosperity of the state". Dr. Richard H. Lewis officially accepted the building for the university and commented: "Nothing appeals more to lusty youth than athletics in all its forms." He also hoped that the Athletic Association of the university would stand "to the athletic world". In the 1910s the freshman were required to do calisthenics three times a week in Bynum. The gymnasium served as the venue for various dances.

The gym was placed under control of a faculty member that was a trained physician and an assistant. Dr. Robert Lawson (who had coached the baseball team) was the first faculty in charge and his assistant was K. L. Wardlaw. Lawson was found to be a skilled gymnast and a favorite of the students. While Bynum Gymnasium had primarily been used for student's gymnastics beforehand, in 1910 an author for The Tar Heel wrote that it could be used as the site for the basketball team to practice because the building was not in use at night. One of the main reasons why the Tar Heels did not have a basketball program until 1910 was the difficulty of finding a place to play. The first basketball game in Bynum was held on January 27, 1911, when North Carolina hosted Virginia Christian and won 42–21. Playing basketball in Bynum was known to have many issues, including the floors being slick, the backboards being "a good deal liver" than most, and lighting being poor.

The pool was closed in 1924 because of an inadequate filtration system and was subsequently used as space for Playmakers Theatre until the building was repurposed. The final intercollegiate basketball game in Bynum was held on February 24, 1923, when the Tar Heels faced Virginia and won 39–16. The Tar Heels stopped playing in Bynum in 1924 as they moved into the Tin Can. In the gym, there was a parallel exercises ladder which often had the best view of games. During the last game against Virginia, the ladder gave way due to their weight and the two students were injured after falling from roughly 25 feet. Dr. Lawson rendered first aid and the students were collectively found to have on broken nose and one broken ankle. While playing in Bynum Gymnasium, the Tar Heels joined the Southern Conference prior to the 1921–22 season. The team won the regular season championship in 1923 and 1924, while winning their postseason conference tournament in 1922 and 1924. The Tar Heels played thirteen seasons in Bynum and ended with a record of 64–15 (.810) in 76 total games. The Tar Heels' worst home record in a season came in the 1911–12 season when they went 3–4, while the team went undefeated at home three times while at Bynum: 1917–18 (7–0), 1920–21 (7–0), and 1922–23 (7–0).

== After the basketball team's departure ==
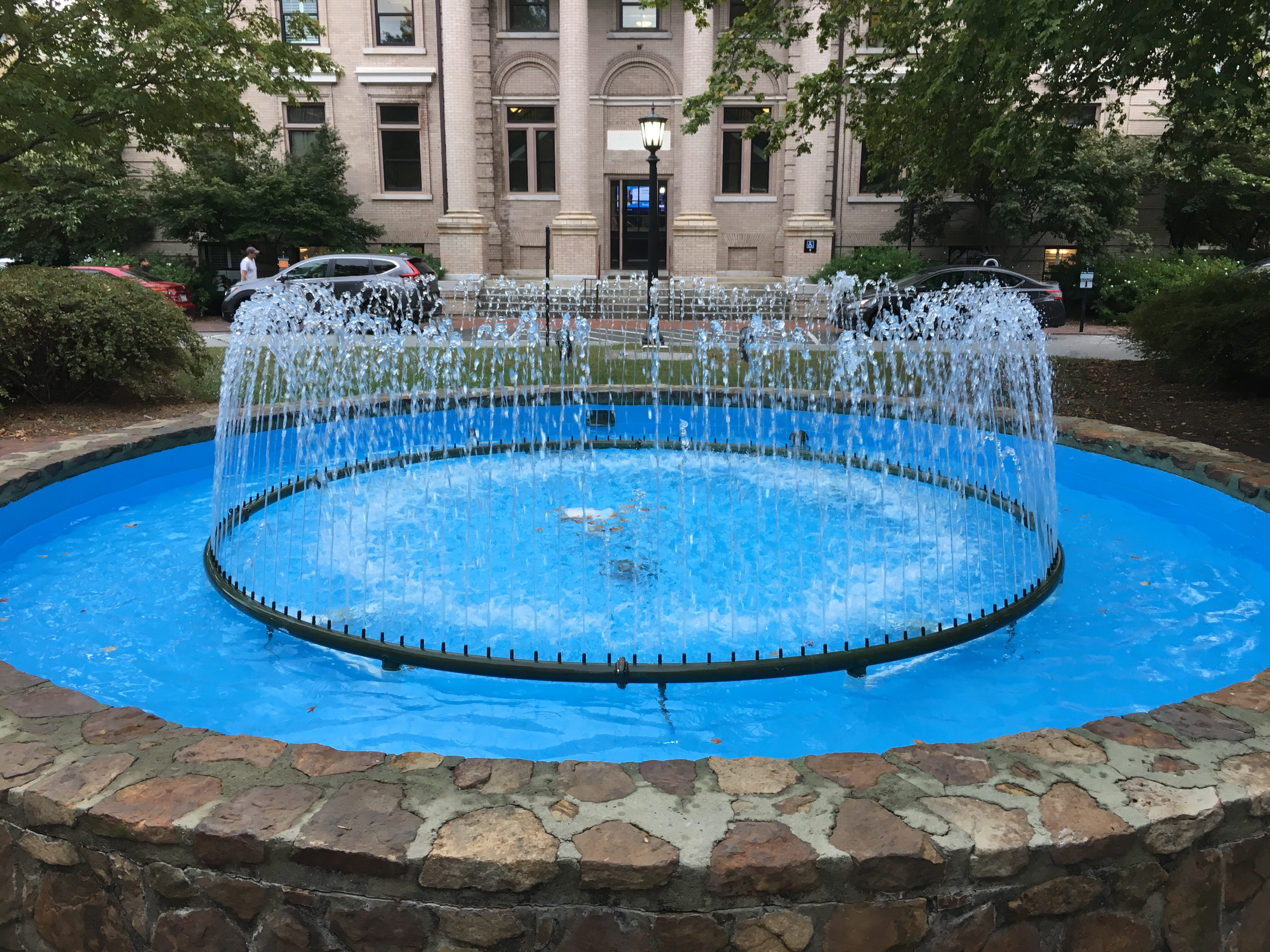
Fountain in front of Bynum Hall, seen in 2019

On January 15, 1924, it was announced that the remodeling of Bynum Gymnasium was completed and it was reopened to students. The renovation was performed by Atwood and Nash. The modifications included reinforcing of the gallery and roof. The Tar Heel wrote that with the men's basketball team's relocation to the Tin Can, it would not be as highly trafficked, thus allowing for more physical education courses. Gymnastics and freshman physical education were the only two courses that remained at Bynum, all other activities were relocated to the Tin Can.

By the 1920s and 1930s the student body had grown from the roughly 600 it had in 1904 and a new gym was needed. To solve this issue, the new Woollen Gymnasium was completed in 1937. In October 1938, it was announced that $25,000 had been granted towards the Bynum to remodel into an office building. Upon completion of the renovation, the facility would host the university press that had been using the basement floor. In addition, a third floor would be added to house the journalism department and news bureau. It was thought that the new location would greatly relieve the press's previously crowded conditions. Atwood and Weeks announced that the construction would start in December 1938, and it was completed in 1939.

During World War II, the university radio station shut down its operations in Caldwell Hall in June 1942. In January 1945, the station resumed its operations in Bynum Hall temporarily. A $45,000 renovation was announced in 1960 and started that fall. It coincided with the School of Journalism moving out of Bynum Hall into Howell Hall in order to give more room for the University News Bureau. In addition, the surplus space not used by the news bureau would be converted into a general classroom for various departments to use as needed. In the 1960s, the Housing Office moved into Bynum's first floor. In 1964, Bynum received a further renovation at a cost of $100,000, which included the addition of air conditioning. In 1974, the Housing Office moved out and the building's roof was repaired in 1974 for $59,000. By the 1980s it housed the University News Bureau still, the University Cashier, and various offices like the Research Administration office and the Affirmative Action office. In order to make Bynum handicap accessible, a ramp and automatic door were installed in 1992. The building now maintains an administrative purpose including offices for the Dean of Graduate Studies and the university counsel.
