= 1921–22 William & Mary Indians men's basketball team =

American college basketball season

1921–22 William & Mary Indians men's basketball
- Conference: Independent
- Record: 10–2
- Head coach: James G. Driver (3rd season)

The 1921–22 William & Mary Indians men's basketball team represented the College of William & Mary in intercollegiate basketball during the 1921–22 season. Under the third year of head coach James G. Driver (who concurrently served as the head baseball coach), the team finished the season with a 10–2 record. This was the 16th season of the collegiate basketball program at William & Mary, whose nickname is now the Tribe.

== Schedule ==
Date time, TV	Rank^{#}	Opponent^{#}	Result	Record	Site city, state
Regular season
*		at Fort Monroe	W 22–15	1–0	Williamsburg, VA
*		Newport News Shipyard	W 55–16	2–0	Williamsburg, VA
*		at George Washington	W 21–14	3–0	Washington, DC
*		at Gallaudet	W 43–31	4–0	Washington, DC
*		Bridgewater (VA)	W 38–21	5–0	Williamsburg, VA
*		at Randolph–Macon	W 43–20	6–0	Ashland, VA
*		at Virginia	L 20–36	6–1	Charlottesville, VA
*		Camp Eustis	W 39–14	7–1	Williamsburg, VA
*		Hampden–Sydney	W 27–12	8–1	Williamsburg, VA
*		Union Theological Seminary	W 51–11	9–1	Williamsburg, VA
2/4/1922*		Richmond	W 26–13	10–1	Williamsburg, VA
2/18/1922*		at Richmond	L 20–22	10–2	Millhiser Gymnasium; Richmond, VA
*Non-conference game. ^{#}Rankings from AP Poll. (#) Tournament seedings in parentheses.
