= Harriman High School =

Location
- Harriman, Roane County, Tennessee; United States; 35.93853°N 84.54448°W

Information
- School type: Public, Secondary
- School district: Roane County Schools
- Director: Leah Watkins
- Principal: Chasity Lowery
- Staff: 23.03 (FTE)
- Enrollment: 360 (2023–2024)
- Student to teacher ratio: 15.63
- Colors: Royal blue and white
- Athletics conference: Tennessee Secondary School Athletic Association
- Mascot: Blue Devils
- Rival: Rockwood High School
- Website: hhs.roaneschools.com

Harriman High School is a public high school located in Harriman, Tennessee, operated by the Roane County School System. As of 2006, the school had an enrollment of 353.

Until 1999, Harriman High School was part of the separate Harriman City School System, which was a legacy of the city's founding in the late nineteenth century as a planned community and "utopia" by temperance movement leaders from the northeastern U.S. and the East Tennessee Land Company. Harriman High came under the authority of the Roane County School System when taxpayers voted to stop paying for a separate system in 1999. Three previous votes on the topic had failed to surrender the system. Proponents of Harriman's separate system claimed the city long had better schools than its county neighbors; those in favor of surrender argued that the town's vanishing industrial base made paying for separate schools impractical.

Harriman's campus is located at the intersection of Georgia and Roane Streets and its athletic teams compete in Richard Pickell Gymnasium, on Wallace-Black Field, and Sharieffa Barksdale Track.

Harriman's mascot is the Blue Devil. Reportedly, an early member of the school board was an alumnus of Duke University, and used his alma mater's nickname for Harriman. The Blue Devils' historical rivals are the Tigers from Rockwood High School in Rockwood, Tennessee and the two share one of Tennessee's oldest football rivalries. The rivalry between Harriman and Rockwood is the state's longest consecutive running rivalry. Harriman and Rockwood started playing in 1921 and have played every year since 1924. The 2022 season will mark the 104th time the teams have played.

== Notable alumni ==
Harriman High School is the alma mater of:

- Sharrieffa Barksdale, U.S. Olympic hurdler (1984 Los Angeles Olympic Games)
- Jeremaine Copeland, former University of Tennessee football player who starred on UT's 1998 National Championship team
