= 1921–22 North Carolina Tar Heels men's basketball team =

American college basketball season

1921–22 North Carolina Tar Heels men's basketball
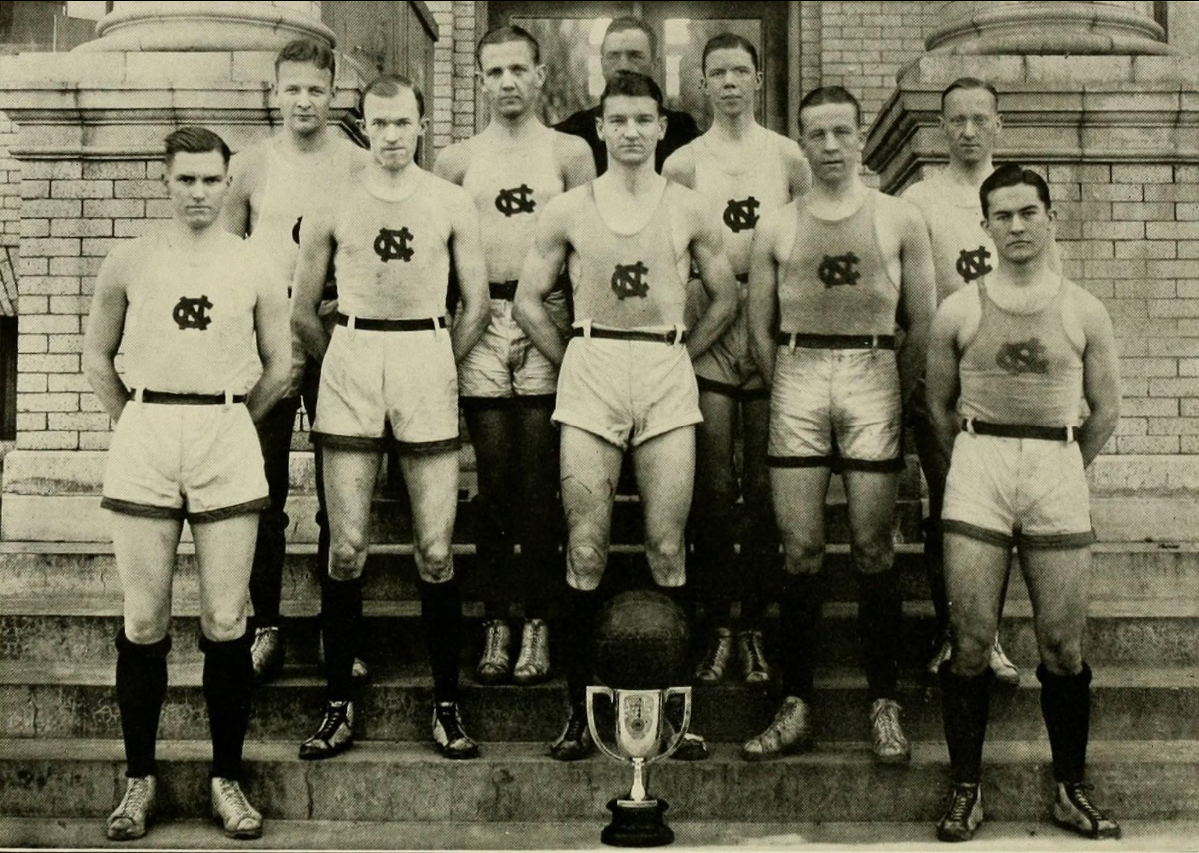

SoCon Tournament Champion
- Conference: Southern Conference
- Record: 15–6 (3–3 SoCon)
- Captain: Cartwright Carmichael
- Home arena: Bynum Gymnasium

1921–22 Southern Conference men's basketball standings
	Conf.				Overall
Team	W		L	PCT	W		L	PCT
Virginia	5	–	0	1.000	17	–	1	.944
Alabama	6	–	1	.857	15	–	4	.789
Georgia	4	–	1	.800	10	–	5	.667
Washington and Lee	6	–	2	.750	11	–	3	.786
Kentucky	3	–	1	.750	10	–	6	.625
Auburn	2	–	1	.667	5	–	6	.455
North Carolina†	3	–	3	.500	15	–	6	.714
Virginia Tech	2	–	2	.500	14	–	6	.700
Georgia Tech	2	–	3	.400	11	–	6	.647
Tennessee	1	–	3	.250	12	–	7	.632
NC State	1	–	5	.167	6	–	13	.316
Clemson	0	–	3	.000	8	–	13	.381
Mississippi A&M	0	–	4	.000	12	–	10	.545
† Southern Intercollegiate Tournament winner As of April 30, 1922

The 1921–22 North Carolina Tar Heels men's basketball team represented the University of North Carolina during the 1921–22 NCAA men's basketball season in the United States. The team finished the season with a 15–6 record and won the 1922 Southern Conference men's basketball tournament.
