= 1922–23 North Carolina Tar Heels men's basketball team =

American college basketball season

1922–23 North Carolina Tar Heels men's basketball
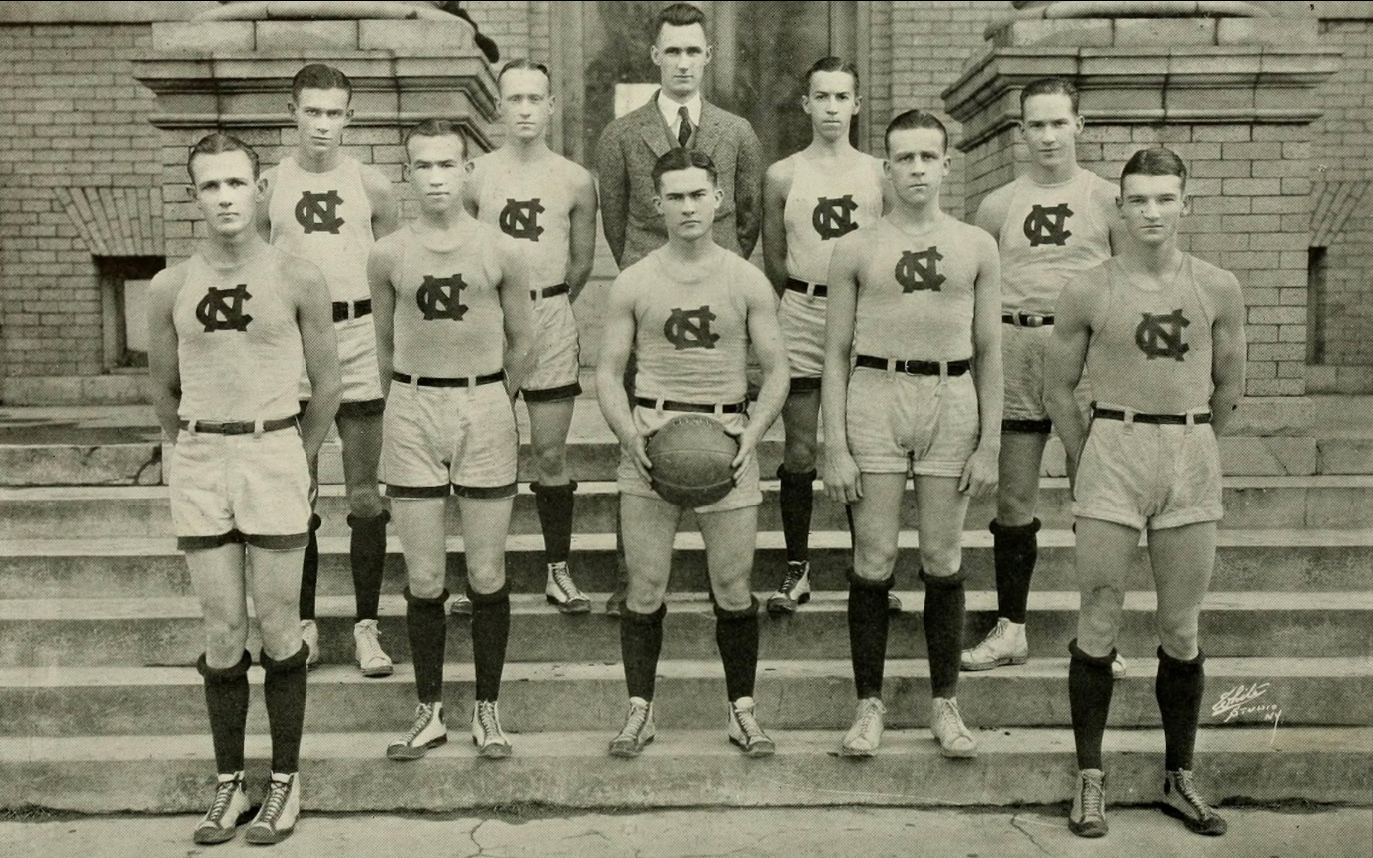

SoCon regular season champion South Atlantic champion
- Conference: Southern Conference
- Record: 15–1 (5–0 SoCon)
- Captain: Monk McDonald
- Home arena: Bynum Gymnasium

1922–23 Southern Conference men's basketball standings
	Conf.				Overall
Team	W		L	PCT	W		L	PCT
North Carolina	5	–	0	1.000	15	–	1	.938
Vanderbilt	2	–	0	1.000	16	–	8	.667
Tulane	5	–	1	.833	15	–	3	.833
Tennessee	3	–	1	.750	15	–	2	.882
Mississippi A&M†	8	–	3	.727	15	–	4	.789
Washington and Lee	4	–	2	.667	7	–	8	.467
Georgia Tech	5	–	3	.625	9	–	9	.500
Alabama	3	–	3	.500	20	–	5	.800
Clemson	3	–	3	.500	11	–	6	.647
Georgia	3	–	3	.500	11	–	8	.579
Auburn	2	–	3	.400	7	–	7	.500
Mississippi	2	–	4	.333	8	–	7	.533
Virginia Tech	1	–	2	.333	13	–	6	.684
NC State	1	–	2	.333	5	–	8	.385
Virginia	1	–	3	.250	12	–	5	.706
South Carolina	0	–	3	.000	6	–	13	.316
Florida	0	–	3	.000	2	–	5	.286
Kentucky	0	–	5	.000	3	–	10	.231
LSU	0	–	6	.000	10	–	10	.500
† Southern Intercollegiate Tournament winner As of April 30, 1923

The 1922–23 North Carolina Tar Heels men's basketball team represented the University of North Carolina during the 1922–23 NCAA men's basketball season in the United States. The team finished the season with a 15–1 record.
