= Newberry Wolves =

Athletic teams representing Newberry College

- University: Newberry College
- Nickname: Wolves
- NCAA: Division II
- Conference: South Atlantic (primary)
- Athletic director: Sean Johnson
- Location: Newberry, South Carolina
- Varsity teams: 25 (10 men's, 12 women's, 3 co-ed)
- Football stadium: Setzler Field
- Basketball arena: Eleazer Arena
- Baseball stadium: Smith Road Baseball Complex
- Softball stadium: Smith Road Softball Complex
- Soccer stadium: Smith Road Soccer Complex
- Lacrosse stadium: Setzler Field
- Tennis venue: Oakland Tennis Center
- Colors: Scarlet and gray
- Website: newberrywolves.com
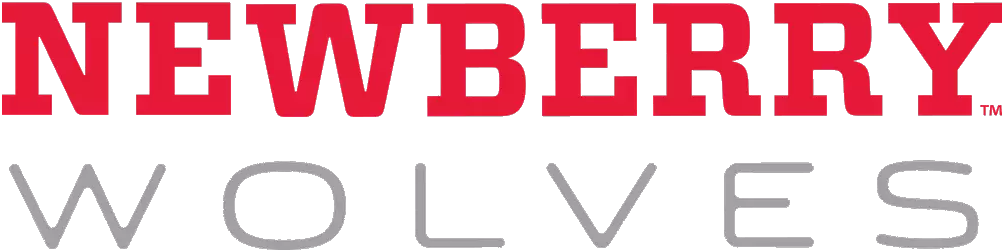

The Newberry Wolves are the athletic teams that represent Newberry College, located in Newberry, South Carolina, in NCAA Division II intercollegiate sports. The Wolves compete as members of the South Atlantic Conference (SAC) for 21 of 23 varsity sports; the remaining two sports, men's and women's wrestling, compete in the Conference Carolinas. Newberry's teams were known as the Indians until 2008.

== Nickname ==
In August 2005, Newberry College was placed on a watch list by the National Collegiate Athletic Association (NCAA), along with 17 other schools, which deemed the use of "Indians" as hostile and abusive, and prohibited the use of Native American nicknames, mascots and imagery in postseason competition. In September 2005, Newberry College appealed to be removed from the list of schools which were declared unable to host postseason play on the basis that none of the institution's uses of "Indians" were hostile and/or abusive toward Native Americans. The next month, the NCAA rejected Newberry's appeal. On May 7, 2008 Newberry's Athletic Department officially retired the nickname "Indians" from all of the school's 15 NCAA athletic teams. The college used their "Block N" logo for Newberry College's athletic teams until June 7, 2010 when Newberry's Athletic Director, Brad Edwards, announced that the school had decided on a new nickname for its athletic teams. Effective from that day, Newberry College athletic teams (men's and women's) would be known as the "Wolves."

== Varsity teams ==
Men's sports	Women's sports
Baseball	Basketball
Basketball	Cross Country
Cross Country	Field Hockey
Football	Golf
Golf	Lacrosse
Lacrosse	Rugby
Soccer	Soccer
Tennis	Softball
Track and Field	Tennis
Wrestling	Track and Field
	Volleyball

== Individual programs ==
=== Football ===
Newberry's football team won their first South Atlantic Conference Championship in the 2006 season. The team finished with a 10–1 record in the regular season, losing only in their last game ever against their rival, Presbyterian College. The team also won a first-round game in their first ever post season appearance in Division II football. Conference champions (2006, 2008, 2016, 2021, 2022, 2025, 2026) NCAA tournament appearances (2006, 2013, 2015, 2016, 2021, 2025, 2026)

=== Basketball ===
In the 1920s, Chuck Wollet was considered the best basketball player from the state of South Carolina, playing for coach Dutch MacLean. Under MacLean, Newberry won four state championships in a row. MacLean Gymnasium was the home of Newberry basketball from 1924 until 1981.

=== Wrestling ===
Begun in 2004, the Newberry College wrestling program was founded by former head coach Jason Valek, who resigned at the end of the 2015-16 season. In his twelve years as coach, Valek led the program to eight top 20 finishes at the NCAA Division II Wrestling Championships.
