= Chattanooga Mocs men's basketball =

Men's basketball team of the University of Tennessee at Chattanooga

2026–27 Chattanooga Mocs men's basketball team
- University: University of Tennessee at Chattanooga
- Head coach: Dan Earl (5th season)
- Location: Chattanooga, Tennessee
- Arena: McKenzie Arena (capacity: 10,928)
- Conference: SoCon
- Nickname: Mocs
- Colors: Navy, old gold, and silver

NCAA Division I tournament champions
- 1977*
Other NCAA Division I tournament results
Runner-up	1976*
Final Four	1976*, 1977*
Elite Eight	1976*, 1977*
Sweet Sixteen	1975*, 1976*, 1977*, 1997
Appearances	1961*, 1973*, 1975*, 1976*, 1977*, 1981, 1982, 1983, 1988, 1993, 1994, 1995, 1997, 2005, 2009, 2016, 2022

Conference tournament champions
- 1923, 1981, 1982, 1983, 1988, 1993, 1994, 1995, 1997, 2005, 2009, 2016, 2022

Conference regular-season champions
- 1981, 1982, 1983, 1985, 1986, 1989, 1991, 1992, 1993, 1994, 1995, 1997, 2016, 2022, 2025

Conference division champions
- 1998, 2002, 2005, 2008, 2009, 2011

NIT champions
- 2025
- * at Division II level

The Chattanooga Mocs men's basketball team represents the University of Tennessee at Chattanooga in NCAA Division I men's competition. On March 30, 2022, Dan Earl was hired as the new head coach. The Mocs have appeared in 12 NCAA tournaments, most recently in 2022.

== History ==
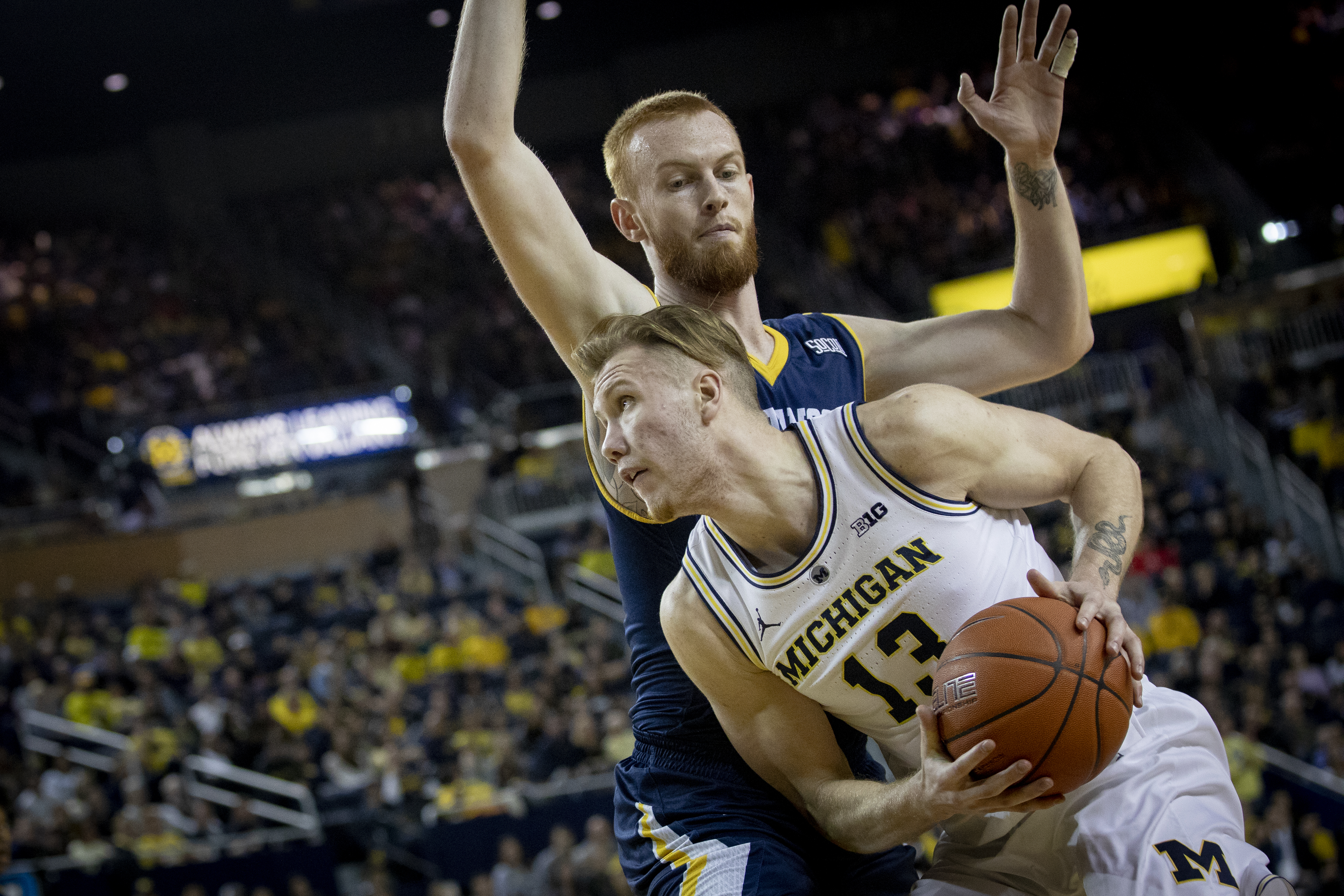
A 2018 game between the Mocs and the University of Michigan

The Mocs won the 1977 NCAA Men's Division II basketball tournament, while completing their transition from Division II to Division I. During the 1997 tournament they progressed to the Sweet Sixteen by defeating both Georgia and Illinois. They eventually lost to Providence.

=== Conference Affiliations ===
- 1914–1932: Southern Intercollegiate Athletic Association
- 1931–1942: Dixie Conference
- 1946–1977: D-II Independent
- 1978–present: Southern Conference

=== Notable NBA/ABA Players ===
- Gerald Wilkins - 13 Seasons, 2x All-SoCon
- Russ Schoene - 5 Seasons
- Johnny Taylor - 3 Seasons, SoCon Player of the Year, 2x First Team All-SoCon
- Willie White - 2 Seasons, SoCon Player of the Year
- Matt Ryan - 4 Seasons, Second Team All-SoCon

=== Coaching History ===
No.	Tenure	Coach	Years	Record	Pct.
1	1913–1914	Leslie Stauffer	1	7–7	.500
2	1916	John Spiegel	1	3–4	.429
3	1919–1920	W.V. Jarrett	2	8–3	.727
4	1921–1928	*Bill Redd	8	62–42	.596
5	1929–1931	Harold Drew	2+	25–24	.510
6	1931–1933	Humpy Phillips	2+	33–19	.635
7	1934–1940	^Pop Keyser	6+	37–78	.322
8	1940–1942, '47	Perron Shoemaker	3+	20–51	.282
9	1946, '48–54	*Bill O'Brien	8+	50–84	.373
10	1955–1958	*Ben Boulware	3+	9–57	.136
11	1959–1962	Tommy Bartlett	4	57–37	.606
12	1963–1972	Leon Ford	10	126–126	.500
13	1973–1979	^Ron Shumate	7	139–61	.695
14	1980–1985	Murray Arnold	6	135–46	.746
15	1986–1997	Mack McCarthy	12	243–122	.666
16	1998–2002	^Henry Dickerson	5	72–73	.497
17	2003–2004	Jeff Lebo	2	40–20	.667
18	2005–2013	^John Shulman	9	145–146	.498
19	2014–2015	Will Wade	2	40–25	.615
20	2016–2017	Matt McCall	2	48–18	.727
21	2018–2022	Lamont Paris	5	87–72	.547
22	2022–2025	Dan Earl	3	68–38	.642
Totals		22 coaches	105 seasons	1,425–1,144	.555
Records updated through end of 2023–24 season Source; *Alum^Promoted from assistant to head coach

=== Year-by-Year results ===
Record table
Season	Coach	Overall	Conference	Standing	Postseason
Tommy Bartlett (Independent) (1958–1962)
1958–59	Tommy Bartlett	14–7			
1959–60	Tommy Bartlett	11–12			
1960–61	Tommy Bartlett	17–8			NCAA College Division First Round
1961–62	Tommy Bartlett	15–10			
Tommy Bartlett:		57–37 (.606)			
Leon Ford (Independent) (1962–1972)
1962–63	Leon Ford	13–13			
1963–64	Leon Ford	13–13			
1964–65	Leon Ford	16–10			
1965–66	Leon Ford	5–19			
1966–67	Leon Ford	8–18			
1967–68	Leon Ford	12–13			
1968–69	Leon Ford	16–10			
1969–70	Leon Ford	12–12			
1970–71	Leon Ford	18–5			
1971–72	Leon Ford	13–13			
Leon Ford:		126–126 (.500)			
Ron Shumate (Independent) (1972–1976)
1972–73	Ron Shumate	19–9			NCAA College Division First Round
1973–74	Ron Shumate	21–5			
1974–75	Ron Shumate	19–9			NCAA Division II Second Round
1975–76	Ron Shumate	23–9			NCAA Division II National Runners-up
Ron Shumate (Southern Conference) (1976–1979)
1976–77	Ron Shumate	27–5	0–0		NCAA Division II National Champions
1977–78	Ron Shumate	16–11	7–5		
1978–79	Ron Shumate	14–13	3–8		
Ron Shumate:		139–61 (.695)	10–13 (.435)		
Murray Arnold (Southern Conference) (1979–1985)
1979–80	Murray Arnold	13–14	7–9		
1980–81	Murray Arnold	21–9	11–5		NCAA Division I First Round
1981–82	Murray Arnold	27–4	15–1		NCAA Division I Second Round
1982–83	Murray Arnold	26–4	15–1		NCAA Division I First Round
1983–84	Murray Arnold	24–7	12–4		NIT Second Round
1984–85	Murray Arnold	24–8	14–2		NIT Quarterfinal
Murray Arnold:		135–46 (.746)	74–22 (.771)		
Mack McCarthy (Southern Conference) (1985–1997)
1985–86	Mack McCarthy	21–10	12–4		NIT First Round
1986–87	Mack McCarthy	21–8	14–2		NIT First Round
1987–88	Mack McCarthy	20–13	8–8		NCAA Division I First Round
1988–89	Mack McCarthy	18–12	10–4		
1989–90	Mack McCarthy	14–14	7–7		
1990–91	Mack McCarthy	19–10	11–3		
1991–92	Mack McCarthy	23–7	12–2		
1992–93	Mack McCarthy	26–7	14–4		NCAA Division I First Round
1993–94	Mack McCarthy	23–7	12–4		NCAA Division I First Round
1994–95	Mack McCarthy	19–11	11–3		NCAA Division I First Round
1995–96	Mack McCarthy	15–12	9–5		
1996–97	Mack McCarthy	24–11	11–3		NCAA Division I Sweet Sixteen
Mack McCarthy:		243–122 (.666)	135–47 (.742)		
Henry Dickerson (Southern Conference) (1997–2002)
1997–98	Henry Dickerson	13–15	7–7		
1998–99	Henry Dickerson	16–12	9–7		
1999–2000	Henry Dickerson	10–19	6–10		
2000–01	Henry Dickerson	17–13	9–7		
2001–02	Henry Dickerson	16–14	11–5		
Henry Dickerson:		72–73 (.497)	40–38 (.513)		
Jeff Lebo (Southern Conference) (2002–2004)
2002–03	Jeff Lebo	21–9	11–5		
2003–04	Jeff Lebo	19–11	10–6		
Jeff Lebo:		40–20 (.667)	21–11 (.656)		
John Shulman (Southern Conference) (2004–2013)
2004–05	John Shulman	20–11	10–6	1st (North)	NCAA Division I First Round
2005–06	John Shulman	19–13	8–6	2nd (North)	
2006–07	John Shulman	15–18	6–12	4th (North)	
2007–08	John Shulman	18–13	13–7	T–1st (North)	
2008–09	John Shulman	18–17	11–9	T–1st (North)	NCAA Division I First Round
2009–10	John Shulman	15–18	6–12	T–3rd (North)	
2010–11	John Shulman	16–16	12–6	T–1st (North)	
2011–12	John Shulman	11–21	5–13	6th (North)	
2012–13	John Shulman	13–19	8–10	5th (North)	
John Shulman:		145–146 (.498)	79–81 (.494)		
Will Wade (Southern Conference) (2013–2015)
2013–14	Will Wade	18–15	12–4	2nd	CIT First Round
2014–15	Will Wade	22–10	15–3	2nd	
Will Wade:		40–25 (.615)	27–7 (.794)		
Matt McCall (Southern Conference) (2015–2017)
2015–16	Matt McCall	29–6	15–3	1st	NCAA Division I First Round
2016–17	Matt McCall	19–12	10–8	4th	
Matt McCall:		48–18 (.727)	25–11 (.694)		
Lamont Paris (Southern Conference) (2017–2022)
2017–18	Lamont Paris	10–23	3–15	10th	
2018–19	Lamont Paris	12–20	7–11	5th	
2019–20	Lamont Paris	20–13	10–8	T–5th	
2020–21	Lamont Paris	18–8	9–7	4th	
2021–22	Lamont Paris	27–8	14–4	1st	NCAA Division I First Round
Lamont Paris:		87–72 (.547)	43–45 (.489)		
Dan Earl (Southern Conference) (2022–present)
2022–23	Dan Earl	18–17	7–11	7th	
2023–24	Dan Earl	21–12	12–6	T–2nd	
2024–25	Dan Earl	29–9	15–3	1st	NIT Champions
Dan Earl:		68–38 (.642)	34–20 (.630)		
Total:		1,454–1,153 (.558)	488–295 (.623)		
National champion Postseason invitational champion Conference regular season champion Conference regular season and conference tournament champion Division regular season champion Division regular season and conference tournament champion Conference tournament champion

== Postseason ==
=== NCAA Division I Tournament results ===
The Mocs have appeared in the NCAA Division I Tournament 12 times. Their combined record is 3–12.

Year	Seed	Round	Opponent	Result
1981	#11	First round	#6 Maryland	L 69–81
1982	#10	First round Second Round	#7 NC State #2 Minnesota	W 58–51; L 61–62
1983	#9	First round	#8 Maryland	L 51–52
1988	#16	First round	#1 Oklahoma	L 66–94
1993	#12	First round	#5 Wake Forest	L 58–81
1994	#13	First round	#4 Kansas	L 73–102
1995	#15	First round	#2 Connecticut	L 71–100
1997	#14	First round Second Round; Sweet Sixteen	#3 Georgia #6 Illinois #10 Providence	W 73–70; W 75–63; L 65–71
2005	#15	First round	#2 Wake Forest	L 54–70
2009	#16	First round	#1 Connecticut	L 47–103
2016	#12	First round	#5 Indiana	L 74–99
2022	#13	First round	#4 Illinois	L 53–54

=== NCAA Division II Tournament results ===
The Mocs have appeared in the NCAA Division II Tournament five times. Their combined record is 11–5 and they were National Champions in 1977.

Year	Round	Opponent	Result
1961	Regional semifinals Regional 3rd-place game	Austin Peay; Kentucky Wesleyan	L 69–77; L 80–111
1973	Regional semifinals Regional 3rd-place game	Southeast Louisiana; Transylvania	L 64–67; W 99–86
1975	Regional semifinals Regional Finals	Alabama State; Tennessee State	W 107–83; L 81–82
1976	Regional semifinals Regional Finals; Elite Eight; Final Four; National Championship Game	Rollins; Valdosta State; Nicholls State; Eastern Illinois; Puget Sound	W 86–62; W 86–66; W 107–78; W 93–84; L 74–83
1977	Regional semifinals Regional Finals; Elite Eight; Final Four; National Championship Game	Valdosta State; UCF; North Dakota; Sacred Heart; Randolph-Macon	W 92–76; W 88–79; W 76–52; W 95–81; W 71–62

=== NIT results ===
The Mocs have appeared in the National Invitation Tournament (NIT) five times, winning it in 2025. Their combined record is 8–4.

Year	Round	Opponent	Result
1984	First round Second Round	Georgia; Tennessee	W 74–69; L 66–68
1985	First round Second Round; Quarterfinals	Clemson; Lamar; Louisville	W 67–65; W 85–84; L 66–71
1986	First round	Georgia	L 81–95
1987	First round	Cleveland State	L 73–92
2025	First round Second Round; Quarterfinals; Semifinals; Championship	Middle Tennessee; Dayton; Bradley; Loyola Chicago; UC Irvine	W 109–103^{3OT} W 87–72; W 67–65; W 80–73; W 85–84^{OT}

=== CIT results ===
The Mocs have appeared in the CollegeInsider.com Postseason Tournament (CIT) one time. Their record is 0–1.

Year	Round	Opponent	Result
2014	First round	East Tennessee State	L 66–79
