= Crook Smith =

American college football, baseball, and basketball player and coach (1899–1990)

Biographical details
- Born: March 21, 1899; Fayetteville, Tennessee, U.S.
- Died: March 3, 1990 (aged 90); Fayetteville, Tennessee, U.S.

Playing career

Football
- 1921–1924: Mercer

Basketball
- 1921–1924: Mercer
- Positions: End (football); Forward (basketball)

Coaching career (HC unless noted)

Football
- 1926–1928: Dalton HS (GA)
- 1929–1942: South Georgia Teachers / Georgia Teachers

Basketball
- 1926–1929: Dalton HS (GA)
- 1930–1942: South Georgia Teachers / Georgia Teachers

Baseball
- 1927–1929: Dalton HS (GA)
- 1933–1935: South Georgia Teachers

Track and field
- 1926–1929: Dalton HS (GA)

Administrative career (AD unless noted)
- 1926–1929: Dalton HS (GA)

Head coaching record
- Overall: 44–63–7 (college football); 116–60 (college basketball); 32–20 (college baseball)

Accomplishments and honors

Awards
- All-Southern (1922, 1923); Mercer Athletics Hall of Fame; Georgia Sports Hall of Fame

Byron Lambert "Consuello" "Crook" Smith (March 21, 1899 – March 3, 1990) was an American college football, baseball, and basketball player and coach inducted into the Georgia Sports Hall of Fame in 1979. He played for Mercer, and, after a short career as a baseball player and umpire in professional baseball, he was the head coach for the Georgia Southern Eagles team of Georgia Southern University (then known as Georgia Teacher's College). He was later assistant pastor and director of young people's work at Immanuel Baptist Church in Savannah.

University of Georgia coach Herman Stegeman said Smith during his playing days was "without a doubt the best all-around athlete of the South."

== Early life and playing career ==
Smith was from Fayetteville. He earned 13 letters in football, baseball, basketball, and track for the Mercer Bears. He was inducted into the Mercer Athletics Hall of Fame in its inaugural year of 1971. "Crook" was the older brother of Phoney Smith.

=== Football ===
Smith was a prominent end on the football team.

==== 1922 ====
He was selected All-Southern.

==== 1923 ====
He was selected All-Southern by Julian Leggett of the Macon News.

=== Basketball ===
In basketball he was a forward, and was selected All-Southern. He was captain of the basketball team. He played alongside George Harmon and Bob Gamble. Their team was the runner-up to North Carolina in the 1922 SoCon Tournament.

== Coaching career ==
In 1925, Smith was appointed athletic director and coach of football, basketball, baseball, and track at Dalton High School in Dalton, Georgia.

Smith coached South Georgia Teachers College–now known as Georgia Southern University—in Statesboro, Georgia from 1929 to 1942. His basketball teams compiled a 116–60 record. His 1937 football team lost the first game played in the Orange Bowl. His 1939 football team won the Bacardi Bowl.

== Later life and death ==
Smith later served as superintendent of schools in Statesboro. He was a vocational rehabilitation counselor for the Savannah Department of Education prior to his retirement in 1967. He died on March 3, 1990, at a hospital in Fayetteville, Tennessee.

== Head coaching record ==
=== College football ===
Year	Team	Overall	Conference	Standing	Bowl/playoffs
South Georgia Teachers / Georgia Teachers Blue Tide (Independent) (1929–1941)
1929	South Georgia Teachers	5–2–2			
1930	South Georgia Teachers	2–3–2			
1931	South Georgia Teachers	2–6			
1932	South Georgia Teachers	6–2			
1933	South Georgia Teachers	5–3			
1934	South Georgia Teachers	4–5			
1935	South Georgia Teachers	3–3–2			
1936	South Georgia Teachers	2–8			
1937	South Georgia Teachers	2–9			
1938	South Georgia Teachers	3–5–1			
1939	Georgia Teachers	5–5			
1940	Georgia Teachers	3–5			
1941	Georgia Teachers	2–8			
South Georgia Teachers / Georgia Teachers:		44–63–7			
Total:		44–63–7			
