= George Harmon (basketball) =

American basketball player (1902–1954)

Personal information
- Born: July 16, 1902 Cuthbert, Georgia, US
- Died: January 30, 1954 (aged 51) Macon, Georgia, US

Career information
- College: Mercer (1922–1923)
- Position: Guard

Career highlights
- SIAA championship (1922); 2x All-Southern (1922, 1923); Mercer Hall of Fame (1973)

George F. Harmon (July 16, 1902 – January 30, 1954) was a college basketball player for the Mercer Baptists. Harmon was "one of the all-time greats" in Mercer basketball history" and "acknowledged king of the basketball world in so far as Southern circles are concerned." He played at guard, and along with forward Consuello Smith and center Bob Gamble, led the Baptists to finish as runner-up to North Carolina in the 1922 SoCon tournament. Mercer upset the previous season's champion Kentucky, and Harmon was the tournament's top scorer with 75 points.

== Early years ==
Harmon was born July 16, 1902, in Cuthbert, Georgia, to the Rev. J. A. Harmon and Mrs. Mamie Feagin Harmon.

== Career ==
Harmon played football and basketball at Mercer University.

On the basketball team, Harmon was a running guard and "sharpshooter". His style of dribbling aroused cheers from spectators, and once got fouls called on him in a 1-point loss to the Atlanta Athletic Club. "Maybe the referee was so surprised that such a thing could be done that he was not responsible for what he did." Harmon was "acknowledged king of the basketball world in so far as Southern circles are concerned." He was "one of the all-time greats" in Mercer basketball history".

Mercer was the runner-up to North Carolina in the 1922 SoCon tournament, and upset the prior season's champion Kentucky. Harmon was the top scorer of the tournament with 75 points.

He was inducted into the Mercer Hall of Fame, with no relatives attending.
