= Bill Redd =

American football and basketball player (1900–1986)

Personal information
- Born: February 26, 1900 Chattanooga, Tennessee, U.S.
- Died: January, 1986

Career information
- College: Chattanooga (1920–1923)
- Position: Center

Career highlights
- All-Southern (1923, 1924)

William Cooper Redd (February 26, 1900 – January, 1986) was an athlete at the University of Chattanooga. He was an All-Southern center and player-coach on the basketball team, leading the team to a runner-up finish in the 1923 SoCon tournament. He was captain of the basketball and football teams in 1920. He also played baseball. He subsequently served as coach and athletic director, and organized Chattanooga's most successful professional basketball team, the Rail-Lites. He was inducted into the Tennessee Sports Hall of Fame in 1984.
