= 1922 NCAA Men's Basketball All-Americans =

- Awarded for: 1921–22 NCAA men's basketball season

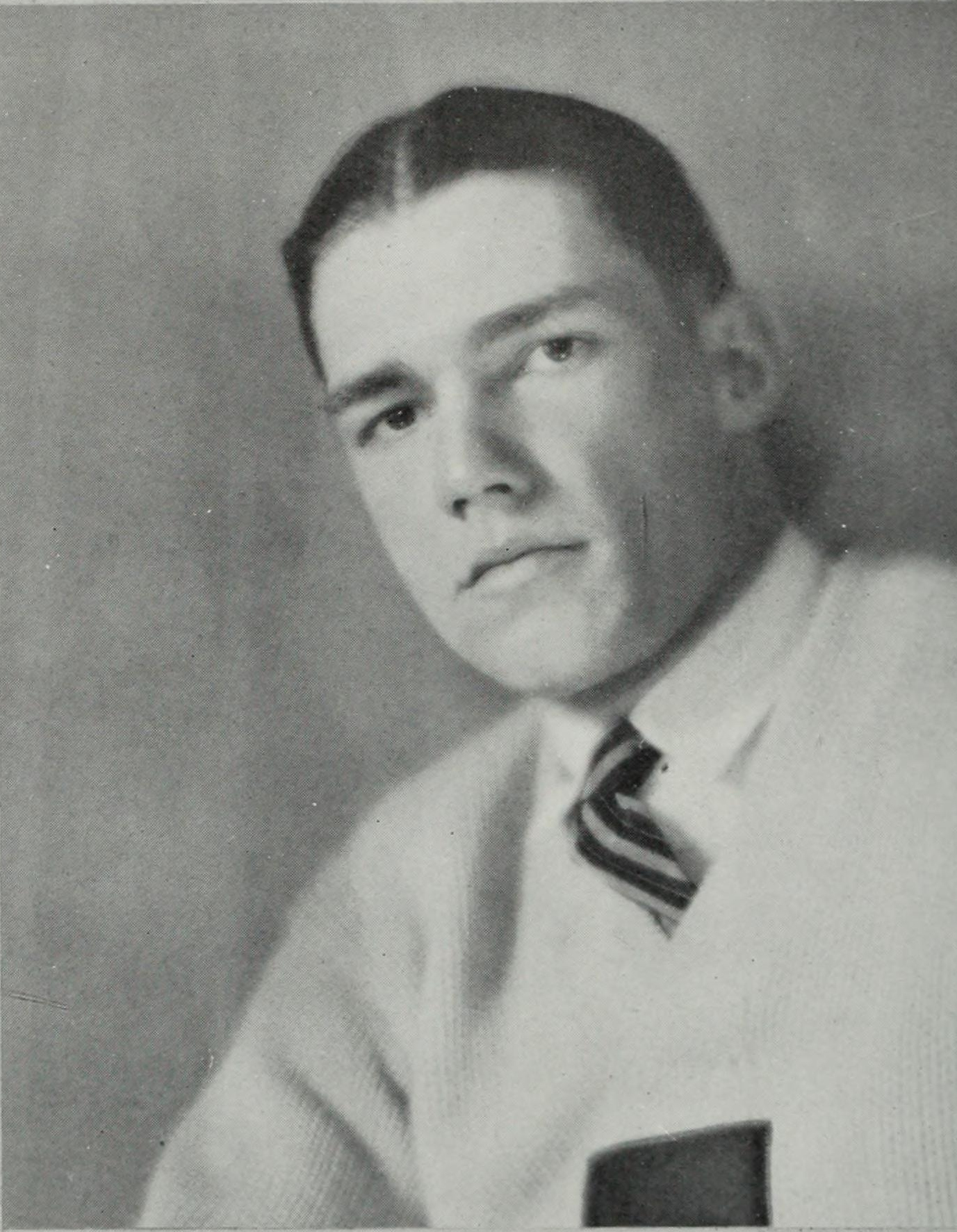
Chuck Carney, Helms Foundation College Basketball Player of the Year at Illinois

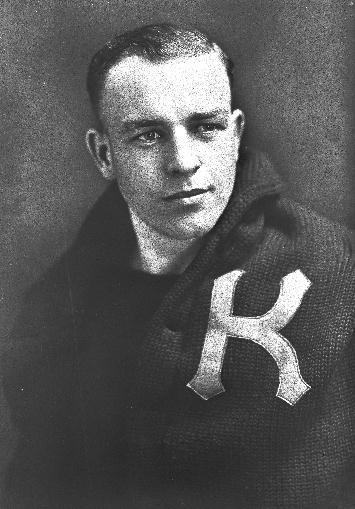
Paul Endacott was a Helms Foundation All-America selection at Kansas.

The 1922 College Basketball All-American team, as chosen retroactively by the Helms Athletic Foundation. The player highlighted in gold was chosen as the Helms Foundation College Basketball Player of the Year retroactively in 1944.

Player	Team
Arthur Browning	Missouri
Herb Bunker	Missouri
Chuck Carney	Illinois
Paul Endacott	Kansas
George Gardner	Southwestern (Kan.)
William Grave	Pennsylvania
Marshall Hjelte	Oregon Agricultural
Arthur Loeb	Princeton
Ira McKee	Navy
Ray Miller	Purdue

== See also ==
- 1921–22 NCAA men's basketball season
