= 1922–23 Kansas Jayhawks men's basketball team =

American college basketball season

1922–23 Kansas Jayhawks men's basketball
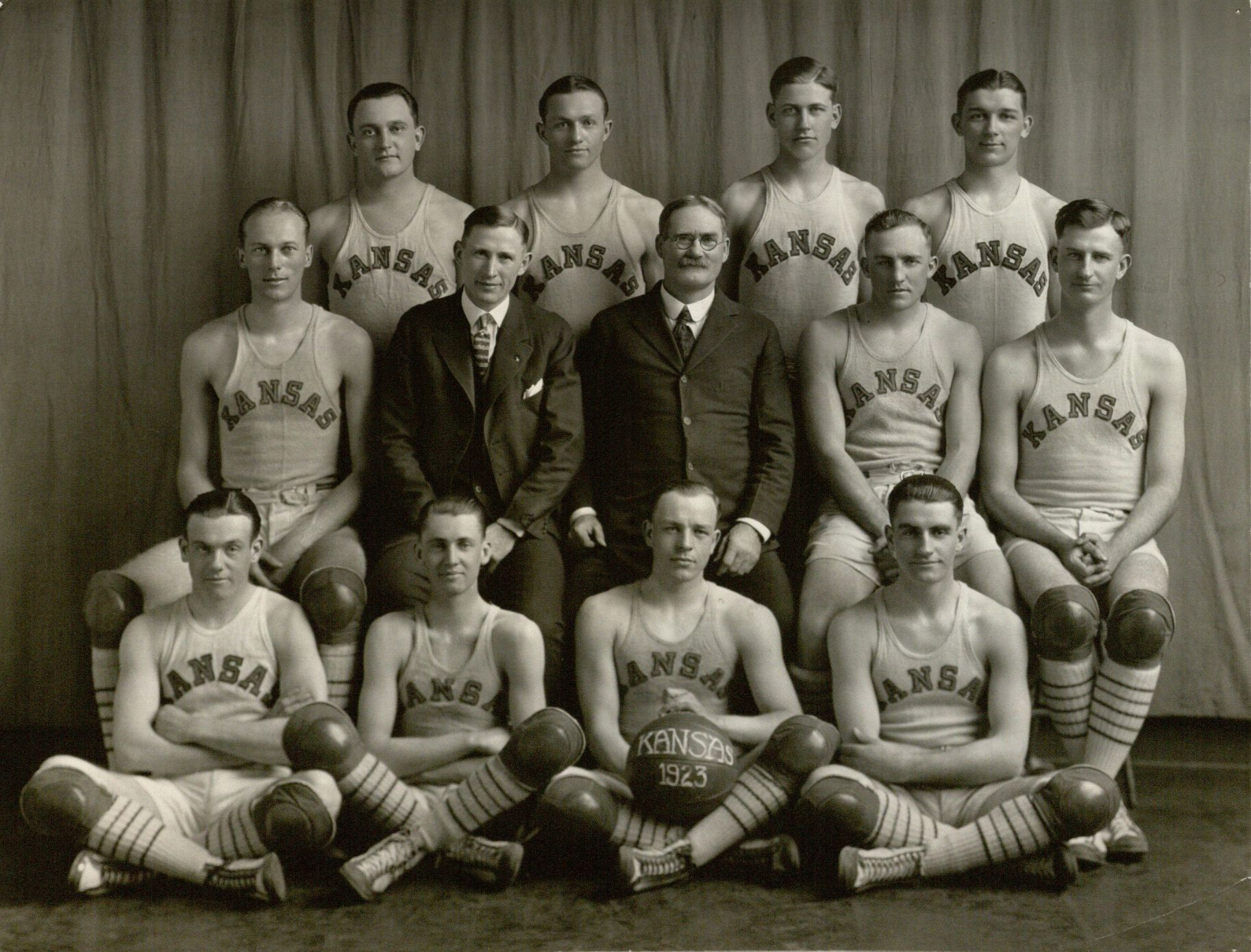

MVIAA Champions Helms Foundation National Champions
- Conference: Missouri Valley Intercollegiate Athletic Association
- Record: 17–1 (16–0 MVIAA)
- Head coach: Phog Allen (6th season)
- Assistant coach: John Bunn (2nd season)
- Captain: Paul Endacott
- Home arena: Robinson Gymnasium

1922–23 Missouri Valley Intercollegiate Athletic Association men's basketball standings
	Conf.				Overall
Team	W		L	PCT	W		L	PCT
Kansas	16	–	0	1.000	17	–	1	.944
Missouri	14	–	2	.875	15	–	3	.833
Drake	10	–	6	.625	10	–	6	.625
Iowa State	9	–	7	.563	10	–	8	.556
Washington University	8	–	8	.500	8	–	10	.444
Nebraska	5	–	11	.313	6	–	12	.333
Oklahoma	5	–	11	.313	6	–	12	.333
Grinnell	3	–	13	.188	3	–	13	.188
Kansas State	2	–	14	.125	2	–	14	.125

The 1922–23 Kansas Jayhawks men's basketball team represented the University of Kansas during the 1922–23 NCAA men's basketball season in the United States. The head coach was Phog Allen, coaching in his sixth overall season with the Jayhawks. The team finished the season with a 17–1 record and were named national champions by the Helms Athletic Foundation for the second consecutive season.

The team was led by senior guard Paul Endacott, junior guard Charlie Black, and sophomore forward/center Tus Ackerman. Endacott and Black were both retroactively named 1923 NCAA Men's Basketball All-Americans, and Endacott was also named the national player of the year. The team also included reserve senior Adolph Rupp, who went on to have a Hall of Fame coaching career at Kentucky. The Jayhawks were later named National Champions by the Helms Athletic Foundation, which Kansas claims alongside their NCAA Tournament Championships as national titles they have won.

== Roster ==
- Tusten Ackerman
- Waldo Bowman
- Paul Endacott
- Byron Frederick
- Andrew McDonald
- James Mosby
- Adolph Rupp
- Charlie T. Black
- William Wilkin

== Schedule and results ==
Date time, TV	Rank^{#}	Opponent^{#}	Result	Record	Site city, state
Regular season
1/3/1923*		at Creighton	W 29–7	1–0	University Gymnnasium; Omaha, NE
1/5/1923		Nebraska	W 30–20	2–0 (1–0)	Robinson Gymnasium; Lawrence, KS
1/8/1923		Iowa State	W 22–12	3–0 (2–0)	Robinson Gymnasium; Lawrence, KS
1/11/1923		at Iowa State	W 37–17	4–0 (3–0)	State Gymnasium; Ames, IA
1/12/1923		at Grinnell	W 23–8	5–0 (4–0)	Grinnell, IA
1/13/1923		at Drake	W 32–18	6–0 (5–0)	Des Moines Coliseum; Des Moines, IA
1/16/1923		at Missouri; Border War	W 21–19	7–0 (6–0)	Rothwell Gymnasium; Columbia, MO
1/17/1923		at Washington University	W 34–16	8–0 (7–0)	Francis Gymnasium; St. Louis, MO
1/22/1923		Washington University	W 41–14	9–0 (8–0)	Robinson Gymnasium; Lawrence, KS
1/24/1923*		at Kansas City Athletic Club	L 23–27	9–1	Club House; Kansas City, MO
1/29/1923		at Oklahoma	W 27–21	10–1 (9–0)	Norman, OK
2/7/1923		Kansas State; Sunflower Showdown	W 44–23	11–1 (10–0)	Robinson Gymnasium; Lawrence, KS
2/12/1923		at Nebraska	W 36–15	12–1 (11–0)	State Fairgrounds Coliseum; Lincoln, NE
2/17/1923		Drake	W 41–11	13–1 (12–0)	Robinson Gymnasium; Lawrence, KS
2/21/1923		at Kansas State; Sunflower Showdown	W 24–17	14–1 (13–0)	Nichols Hall; Manhattan, KS
2/22/1923		Oklahoma	W 42–18	15–1 (14–0)	Robinson Gymnasium; Lawrence, KS
2/24/1923		Grinnell	W 38–16	16–1 (15–0)	Robinson Gymnasium; Lawrence, KS
2/28/1923		Missouri; Border War	W 23–20	17–1 (16–0)	Robinson Gymnasium; Lawrence, KS
*Non-conference game. ^{#}Rankings from AP Poll. (#) Tournament seedings in parentheses.
