= George E. Rody =

American basketball player and coach

George Edward Rody (1899 - September 13, 1956) was the team captain and leading scorer of the 1921–22 Kansas Jayhawks men's basketball team, which is recognized as the first national championship basketball team at the University of Kansas. He later served as head basketball and baseball coach at Oklahoma A&M University and head basketball coach at Tulane University.

== Early life ==
Rody grew up in Downs, Kansas, and graduated from Wentworth Military Academy in Lexington, Missouri in 1918. At Wentworth, Rody served as a First Lieutenant in Company B. He lettered in baseball and basketball, leading the basketball team to a conference championship and a 9 and 4 record, including a victory over Park College.

== Athletic career ==
=== Player ===
Rody entered the University of Kansas in the fall of 1918, and earned three letters each in basketball and baseball. As a pitcher on the baseball nine, he helped the team to Missouri Valley Conference championships in both 1921 and 1922. As a senior forward and basketball team captain in 1921–22, Rody led the Jayhawks to a 16–2 record and the Missouri Valley Conference championship, playing under legendary Hall of Fame coach Phog Allen. That season, Rody led the team and conference in scoring with a 14.7 average, and was named first team All Missouri Valley Conference.

According to Spalding’s Official Basketball Guide for 1922, Rody was given the “first team captaincy” of the all Missouri Valley Conference team, the forerunner of the conference “Most Valuable Player” award. Rody was described as “the high point scorer in the Conference, combining goals from the field with shots from the foul line. The Kansas captain was a speed flash, a good shot, a brilliant dribbler, a shifty dodger, side-stepping, pivoting and out-witting his guards frequently. Also, Rody is 'one of the finest and cleanest players in the Valley,' quoting the coach of a rival team. . . Rody led the Kansas team through a strenuous schedule and held up his play nearly all the way. He is worthy of the honor in every way." (pp. 74–75)

The 1921-22 Jayhawk team, which also included future hall of famer Paul Endacott, Adolph Rupp and Charlie T. Black, was retroactively awarded the national championship by the Helms Athletic Foundation, the first such national basketball title for Kansas.

Following the completion of his college career, Rody spent three years with the Hillyard Shine Alls, one of the top Amateur Athletic Union basketball teams in the United States, while also playing semi-pro baseball.

=== Coach ===
After his stint with the Hillyards, Rody entered the coaching ranks in 1926, heading Central High School's basketball squad in Oklahoma City, Oklahoma for three seasons.

In 1929, Rody was named as head basketball and baseball coach of the Oklahoma A&M Aggies. Rody led the baseball team to a 9 and 3 record in 1930 before the sport was discontinued for the 1931 season due to financial concerns. His Cowboy basketball teams had two losing seasons, with a 1 and 15 record in 1929–30, and a 7 and 9 record in 1930–31. However, the 1931 team's 5 and 3 record in the Missouri Valley Conference earned them a conference co-championship. Rody moved to the Tulane Green Wave the following season and coached two years with a 6 and 10 record in 1931-32 and an 8 and 15 record in 1932–33.

== Head coaching record ==
=== Basketball ===
Statistics overview
Season	Team	Overall	Conference	Standing	Postseason
Oklahoma A&M (Missouri Valley Conference) (1929–1931)
1929–30	Oklahoma A&M	1–15	0–8	5th	
1930–31	Oklahoma A&M	7–9	5–3	T–1st	
Oklahoma A&M:		8–24 (.250)	5–11 (.313)		
Tulane (Southern Conference) (1931–1933)
1931–32	Tulane	6–10			
1932–33	Tulane	8–15			
Tulane:		14–25 (.359)			
Total:		22–49 (.310)			
National champion Postseason invitational champion Conference regular season champion Conference regular season and conference tournament champion Division regular season champion Division regular season and conference tournament champion Conference tournament champion

=== Baseball ===
Statistics overview
Season	Team	Overall	Conference	Standing	Postseason
Oklahoma A&M Cowboys (Missouri Valley Conference) (1930)
1930	Oklahoma A&M	9–3			
Oklahoma A&M:		9–3 (.750)			
Total:		9–3 (.750)			
National champion Postseason invitational champion Conference regular season champion Conference regular season and conference tournament champion Division regular season champion Division regular season and conference tournament champion Conference tournament champion
