= 1923 NCAA Men's Basketball All-Americans =

- Awarded for: 1922–23 NCAA men's basketball season

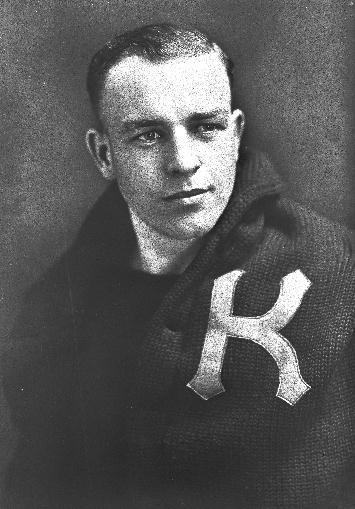
Paul Endacott of Kansas, the 1923 Helms Foundation Player of the Year.

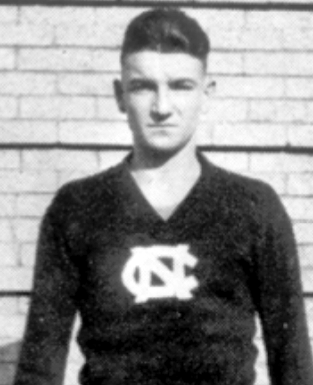
Cartwright Carmichael of North Carolina.

The 1923 College Basketball All-American team, as chosen retroactively by the Helms Athletic Foundation. The player highlighted in gold was chosen as the Helms Foundation College Basketball Player of the Year retroactively in 1944.

Player	Team
Charlie Black	Kansas
Arthur Browning	Missouri
Herb Bunker	Missouri
Cartwright Carmichael	North Carolina
Paul Endacott	Kansas
Al Fox	Idaho
Ira McKee	Navy
Arthur Loeb	Princeton
James Lovley	Creighton
John Luther	Cornell

== See also ==
- 1922–23 NCAA men's basketball season
