= Onur Group =

ONUR Group
- Type: Private
- Industry: Construction, infrastructure, energy, mining, transportation, industrial production, real estate investments
- Founded: 1981
- Founders: Onur Çetinceviz, İhsan Çetinceviz
- Headquarters: Ankara, Türkiye
- Area served: Europe, Middle East, Central Asia
- Key people: Onur Çetinceviz, İhsan Çetinceviz, Aslı Çetinceviz
- Services: EPC contracting, infrastructure development, energy investments
- Website: www.onurgroup.com

ONUR Group is a Turkish diversified conglomerate. Founded in 1981, the group operates transportation, infrastructure, energy and industrial projects across Europe, the Middle East, Central Asia, and Africa.

The company is headquartered in Ankara, Türkiye, and maintains operations across several international markets, including Ukraine, Saudi Arabia, Romania, and Moldova.

== History ==
The foundations of ONUR Group date back to the early 1980s with the establishment of Çetin İşletmeleri, which initially operated in the construction and contracting sector. In 1991, Onur Çetinceviz and İhsan Çetinceviz established ONUR Taahhüt İnşaat, expanding the group’s activities in infrastructure and transportation projects.

ONUR Group’s construction division has completed transportation, infrastructure, and energy projects internationally, including those in Croatia, Ukraine, Moldova, Saudi Arabia, Tunisia, Oman, Equatorial Guinea, Turkmenistan, and Venezuela.

In the 2010s and 2020s, ONUR Group continued to expand its operations in infrastructure, transportation, industrial production, renewable energy, and real estate development. In the 2020s in particular the conglomerate expanded its investments in industrial production and renewable energy.

During the Russo–Ukrainian War, ONUR Group participated in reconstruction-related infrastructure projects in Ukraine, including the reconstruction of the Irpin Bridge near Kyiv.

ONUR Taahhüt Taşımacılık İnşaat Ticaret ve Sanayi AŞ has been listed in Engineering News-Record (ENR)'s Top 250 International Contractors ranking continuously since 2009. The company reached its highest position at No. 82 in 2022 and was ranked No. 92 in 2021.

The company was also listed No. 240 in ENR’s Top 250 Global Contractors ranking in 2021. Most of the company’s reported international revenue was generated from transportation and infrastructure projects.

Despite the Russo–Ukrainian War, ONUR Group continued its operations and investments in Ukraine throughout the 2020s.

In 2024, a photograph documenting the construction of the Irpin Bridge by Onur Group Ukraine was recognized in the ENR 2024 Year in Construction Photo Contest.
