= Arthur J. Fox Jr. =

American civil engineer and magazine editor (1923–2016)

- Born: September 19, 1923; Brooklyn, New York, U.S.
- Died: May 11, 2016 (aged 92); Rockville, Maryland, U.S.
- Education: Manhattan College (BCE)
- Spouses: Ann Marie McElroy (m. 1946; died 1991); Lorraine Hodge (m. 1993)
- Children: 2
- Military career
- Branch: United States Army
- Service years: 1943–1945
- Rank: Sergeant
- Units: 312th Engineer Combat Battalion, 87th Infantry Division
- Conflicts: World War II

Arthur J. Fox Jr. (September 19, 1923 – May 11, 2016) was an American civil engineer and magazine editor that served as the editor-in-chief of Engineering News-Record from 1964 to 1988. He was president of the American Society of Civil Engineers in 1976.

== Early life and education ==
Arthur Joseph Fox Jr. was born in Brooklyn, New York on September 19, 1923 to Arthur J. Fox and Mary L. Fox (née Foley). He lived in New York City for most of his time as a child; his family later resided in Queens Village and also had a summer house upstate in Copake Falls. Fox lived at home in Queens while he was attending Manhattan College in the Bronx, where he had a 90 minute commute to the campus via public transportation. He enlisted into the United States Army Reserve in December 1942 and was placed into active duty after completing the third year of his civil engineering program in May 1943.

Following basic training at Fort Belvoir in Virginia, Fox served in the 312th Engineer Combat Battalion of the 87th Infantry Division, which was sent to Europe and involved in the Battle of the Bulge. Using the drafting skills he learned in college, Fox started as a draftsman in the unit and was later promoted to a reconnaissance sergeant and was responsible for drawing the situation map for each day's report, which showed the conditions of roads and bridges. He also wrote detailed letters to send home to his family, and a letter to his Aunt Margaret that she found to be particularly inspiring was read on Report to the Nation, a weekly radio show on CBS Radio that aired on Saturdays. After he returned home from the war, Fox resumed his studies at Manhattan College and obtained a Bachelor of Civil Engineering (BCE) degree in 1947.

== Career ==
After graduating from college, Fox spent a year working as a structural designer with the engineering firm of Sanderson & Porter. However, he was also interested in journalism and applied for jobs to most of the engineering-related magazines in New York City. Fox was offered a position with Engineering News-Record by editor-in-chief Waldo Bowman and began working for the editorial staff of the magazine in 1948. (Note: Waldo Bowman would later serve as the president of ASCE in 1964.)

He succeeded Bowman as editor-in-chief of Engineering News-Record in 1964, the same year in which the publication began recognizing individuals that had made significant contributions to the construction industry. Two years later, Engineering News-Record began naming its first "Man of the Year". Engineering News-Record started publishing rankings of the industry's top design firms in 1965. In 1966, the year in which New York City Mayor John Lindsay stripped Robert Moses of his position as the city's coordinator of arterial highways, Fox faced criticism from Moses as a result of a headline gaffe in Engineering News-Record regarding his political battle with Lindsay. After the ordeal, which involved Fox being scolded by Moses and executives at McGraw-Hill, he wrote an internal office memo that said, "I can't promise that we'll never again run afoul of this fellow."

Fox went on to serve as the managing director of the Construction Industry Presidents Forum (CIPF) after retiring as editor-in-chief of Engineering News-Record in 1988. He retired from the position at the end of 1998, shortly after the CIPF became the Construction Industry Round Table. Meanwhile, Fox continued his association with Engineering News-Record and was an editor emeritus of the magazine.

== Professional societies and awards ==
Fox first became involved with the American Society of Civil Engineers (ASCE) while he was a student at Manhattan College. His involvement with ASCE grew during his career with Engineering News-Record in the late 1940s. He went on to serve as president of the ASCE Metropolitan Section and subsequently led the national society. While he was serving as the president of ASCE in 1976, Fox improved the society's internal and external communications by initiating regional conferences for leaders of ASCE's local sections, launched ASCE News, and revamped the society's annual awards ceremony. During his term as president, ASCE's Board of Direction also approved significant changes to its code of ethics; Fox later served as a principal author of amendments to ASCE's code of ethics in 2006 that included a zero-tolerance policy for bribery, fraud, and corruption.

He was the recipient of the Award of Merit from the American Consulting Engineers Council in 1975, the Civil Engineer of the Year Award from the ASCE Metropolitan Section in 1975, an honorary doctorate from Manhattan College in 1982, the We Dig America Award from the National Utility Contractors Association in 1986, and the Golden Beaver Award from The Moles in 1988. Fox was elected as a member of the National Academy of Construction in 2001.

== Personal life and death ==
Fox married Ann Marie McElroy on September 7, 1946. The couple resided in Douglaston, Queens and had one daughter and one son. After his first wife died of cancer in 1991, he married Lorraine Hodge in Maryland on September 10, 1993. (Note: Lorraine had been previously married to Raymond J. Hodge, a civil engineer who died in 1990. In 2000, the Raymond J. Hodge Memorial Scholarship at Manhattan College was founded by Lorraine Hodge Fox and Arthur J. Fox Jr. to honor her deceased husband, who had graduated from Manhattan College in 1944.) His sister Elinor also was an editor who resided in Copake Falls for 64 years and founded and published the Roe Jan Independent; she used the local newspaper as a platform to advocate for the establishment of the Harlem Valley Rail Trail Association, which led to the creation of the Harlem Valley Rail Trail.

Fox remained closely associated with his college after graduation and was elected as president of the Manhattan College Alumni Society in 1964. In 2011, he established the American Society of Civil Engineers Scholarship at Manhattan College. (Note: The American Society of Civil Engineers Scholarship at Manhattan College also recognizes Joseph S. Ward, who graduated from Manhattan College in 1946 and served as president of ASCE in 1980.) Fox was diagnosed with pancreatic cancer in January 2016 and died in Rockville, Maryland on May 11, 2016.
