= 1921–22 Kansas Jayhawks men's basketball team =

American college basketball season

1921–22 Kansas Jayhawks men's basketball
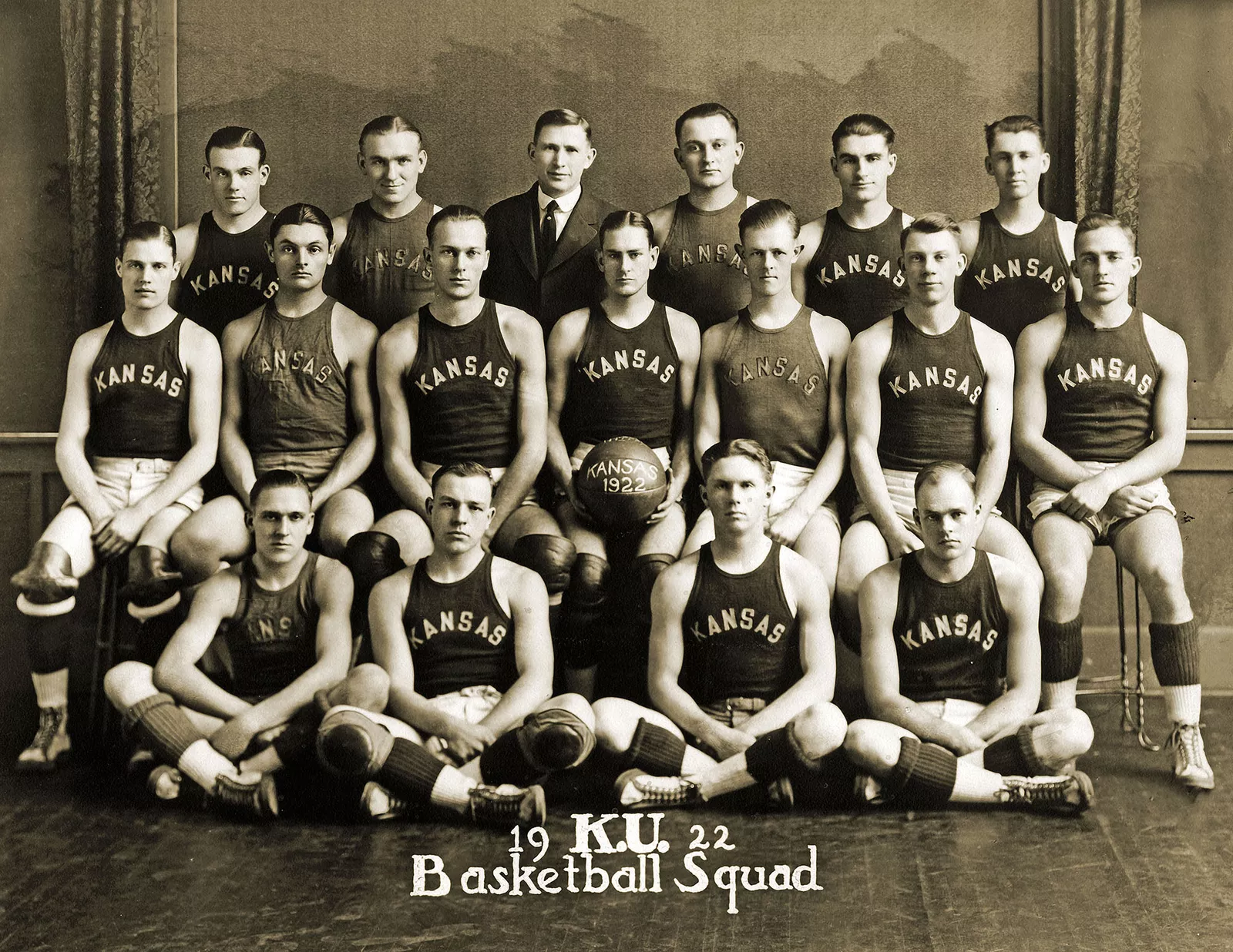

MVIAA Co-Champions Helms Foundation National Champions
- Conference: Missouri Valley Intercollegiate Athletic Association
- Record: 16–2 (15–1 MVIAA)
- Head coach: Phog Allen (5th season)
- Assistant coach: John Bunn (1st season)
- Captain: George Rody
- Home arena: Robinson Gymnasium

1921–22 Missouri Valley Intercollegiate Athletic Association men's basketball standings
	Conf.				Overall
Team	W		L	PCT	W		L	PCT
Missouri	15	–	1	.938	16	–	1	.941
Kansas	15	–	1	.938	16	–	2	.889
Drake	12	–	4	.750	14	–	4	.778
Iowa State	8	–	8	.500	10	–	8	.556
Oklahoma	8	–	8	.500	9	–	9	.500
Nebraska	8	–	8	.500	8	–	9	.471
Kansas State	3	–	13	.188	3	–	14	.176
Grinnell	2	–	14	.125	5	–	14	.263
Washington University	1	–	15	.063	1	–	18	.053

The 1921–22 Kansas Jayhawks men's basketball team represented the University of Kansas during the 1921–22 NCAA men's basketball season in the United States. The head coach was Phog Allen, coaching in his fifth overall season with the Jayhawks. The team finished the season with a 16–2 record and was retroactively named national champions by the Helms Athletic Foundation. This was Kansas' first of two consecutive Helms national championships.

Team captain and senior forward George E. Rody led the team and the Missouri Valley Conference in scoring with a 14.7 average. Rody was awarded the “first team captaincy” of the All Conference team, the forerunner of the Conference “Most Valuable Player” award. Junior Paul Endacott was also named first team All Conference and was retroactively declared a consensus All-American by the Helms Foundation. The team also included standout sophomore Charlie T. Black and reserve junior Adolph Rupp, who later went on to a Hall of Fame coaching career at Kentucky.

== Roster ==
- Waldo Bowman
- Paul Endacott
- Armin F. Woestemeyer
- Byron Frederick
- Andrew McDonald
- George Rody
- Adolph Rupp
- Charlie T. Black
- John Wulf

== Schedule and results ==
Date time, TV	Rank^{#}	Opponent^{#}	Result	Record	Site city, state
Regular season
1/2/1922*		at Minnesota	W 32–11	1–0	UM Armory; Minneapolis, MN
1/6/1922		Grinnell	W 38–16	2–0 (1–0)	Robinson Gymnasium; Lawrence, KS
1/10/1922		Drake	W 28–23	3–0 (2–0)	Robinson Gymnasium; Lawrence, KS
1/16/1922		Washington University	W 44–17	4–0 (3–0)	Robinson Gymnasium; Lawrence, KS
1/19/1922		at Nebraska	W 25–15	5–0 (4–0)	State Fairgrounds Coliseum; Lincoln, NE
1/24/1922		Missouri; Border War	L 25–35	5–1 (4–1)	Robinson Gymnasium; Lawrence, KS
1/30/1922*		at Kansas City Athletic Club	L 32–34	5–2	Club House; Kansas City, MO
2/1/1922		at Oklahoma	W 26–18	6–2 (5–1)	Norman, OK
2/6/1922		Iowa State	W 32–21	7–2 (6–1)	Robinson Gymnasium; Lawrence, KS
2/8/1922		at Kansas State; Sunflower Showdown	W 32–23	8–2 (7–1)	Nichols Hall; Manhattan, KS
2/11/1922		Oklahoma	W 42–28	9–2 (8–1)	Robinson Gymnasium; Lawrence, KS
2/14/1922		at Iowa State	W 24–18	10–2 (9–1)	State Gymnasium; Ames, IA
2/15/1922		at Grinnell	W 21–14	11–2 (10–1)	Grinnell, IA
2/16/1922		at Drake	W 28–13	12–2 (11–1)	Des Moines Coliseum; Des Moines, IA
2/21/1922		at Missouri; Border War	W 26–16	13–2 (12–1)	Rothwell Gymnasium; Columbia, MO
2/22/1922		at Washington University	W 41–26	14–2 (13–1)	Francis Gymnasium; St. Louis, MO
2/28/1922		Kansas State; Sunflower Showdown	W 44–26	15–2 (14–1)	Robinson Gymnasium; Lawrence, KS
3/6/1922		Nebraska	W 41–18	16–2 (15–1)	Robinson Gymnasium; Lawrence, KS
*Non-conference game. ^{#}Rankings from AP Poll. (#) Tournament seedings in parentheses.
