= 1921–22 Iowa State Cyclones men's basketball team =

American college basketball season

1921–22 Iowa State Cyclones men's basketball
- Conference: Missouri Valley Intercollegiate Athletic Association
- Record: 10–8 (8–8 MVIAA)
- Head coach: Bill Chandler (1st season)
- Assistant coach: E.E. Mylin
- Home arena: State Gymnasium

1921–22 Missouri Valley Intercollegiate Athletic Association men's basketball standings
	Conf.				Overall
Team	W		L	PCT	W		L	PCT
Missouri	15	–	1	.938	16	–	1	.941
Kansas	15	–	1	.938	16	–	2	.889
Drake	12	–	4	.750	14	–	4	.778
Iowa State	8	–	8	.500	10	–	8	.556
Oklahoma	8	–	8	.500	9	–	9	.500
Nebraska	8	–	8	.500	8	–	9	.471
Kansas State	3	–	13	.188	3	–	14	.176
Grinnell	2	–	14	.125	5	–	14	.263
Washington University	1	–	15	.063	1	–	18	.053

The 1921–22 Iowa State Cyclones men's basketball team (also known informally as Ames) represented Iowa State University during the 1921–22 NCAA men's basketball season. The Cyclones were coached by Bill Chandler, who was in his first season with the Cyclones. They played their home games at the State Gymnasium in Ames, Iowa.

They finished the season 10–8, 8–8 in Missouri Valley play to finish tied for fourth place.

== Roster ==
1921–22 Iowa State Cyclones men's basketball team
Players
Coaches

Pos.	#	Name	Height	Weight	Year	Hometown
		W.H. Bartlett	—	—	So
F		H.C. Butcher	—	—	So
G		Jack Currie (C)	—	—
F		F.E. Elliott	—	—	So
F		Reese "Pinky" Greene	—	—	Jr
C		M.N. Innes	—	—	Sr
		Lane	—	—
F		C.W. Paige	—	—
F		R.E. Paxton	—	—	So
C		H.L. Stauffer	—	—	So	Newton, Iowa
G		H.E. Woodward	—	—	Sr

Head coach

- Bill Chandler

Assistant coach(es)

E.E. Mylin

Legend

- (C) Team captain
- (S) Suspended
- (I) Ineligible
- (W) Walk-on
- Injured
- Current redshirt

== Schedule and results ==
Date time, TV	Rank^{#}	Opponent^{#}	Result	Record	Site city, state
Regular season
December 19, 1921*; 6:45 pm		Cornell	W 29–5	1–0	State Gymnasium; Ames, Iowa
December 21, 1921*		Coe	W 35–12	2–0	State Gymnasium; Ames, Iowa
January 9, 1922; 6:45 pm		Nebraska	L 14–21	2–1 (0–1)	State Gymnasium; Ames, Iowa
January 14, 1922		at Oklahoma	W 25–21	3–1 (1–1)	Norman, Oklahoma
January 16, 1922		at Kansas State	W 36–26	4–1 (2–1)	Nichols Hall; Manhattan, Kansas
January 21, 1922; 1:30 pm		Drake; Iowa Big Four	L 19–33	4–2 (2–2)	State Gymnasium; Ames, Iowa
January 28, 1922; 7:30 pm		Missouri	L 18–30	4–3 (2–3)	State Gymnasium; Ames, Iowa
February 1, 1922		at Drake; Iowa Big Four	L 22–24	4–4 (2–4)	Des Moines Coliseum; Des Moines, Iowa
February 4, 1922		at Nebraska	W 26–7	5–4 (3–4)	State Fairgrounds Coliseum; Lincoln, Nebraska
February 6, 1922		at Kansas	L 21–32	5–5 (3–5)	Robinson Gymnasium; Lawrence, Kansas
February 10, 1922		at Washington (MO)	W 20–16	6–5 (4–5)	Francis Gymnasium; St. Louis, Missouri
February 11, 1922		at Missouri	L 19–29	6–6 (4–6)	Rothwell Gymnasium; Columbia, Missouri
February 14, 1922; 4:30 pm		Kansas	L 18–24	6–7 (4–7)	State Gymnasium; Ames, Iowa
February 18, 1922		at Grinnell	W 17–11	7–7 (5–7)	Grinnell, Iowa
February 23, 1922		Oklahoma	L 27–29	7–8 (5–8)	State Gymnasium; Ames, Iowa
February 24, 1922		Kansas State	W 28–22	8–8 (6–8)	State Gymnasium; Ames, Iowa
March 2, 1922		Washington (MO)	W 33–16	9–8 (7–8)	State Gymnasium; Ames, Iowa
March 4, 1922		Grinnell	W 26–20	10–8 (8–8)	State Gymnasium; Ames, Iowa
*Non-conference game. ^{#}Rankings from AP poll. (#) Tournament seedings in parentheses. All times are in Central Time.
