= 1922–23 Iowa State Cyclones men's basketball team =

American college basketball season

1922–23 Iowa State Cyclones men's basketball
- Conference: Missouri Valley Intercollegiate Athletic Association
- Record: 10–8 (9–7 MVIAA)
- Head coach: Bill Chandler (2nd season)
- Home arena: State Gymnasium

1922–23 Missouri Valley Intercollegiate Athletic Association men's basketball standings
	Conf.				Overall
Team	W		L	PCT	W		L	PCT
Kansas	16	–	0	1.000	17	–	1	.944
Missouri	14	–	2	.875	15	–	3	.833
Drake	10	–	6	.625	10	–	6	.625
Iowa State	9	–	7	.563	10	–	8	.556
Washington University	8	–	8	.500	8	–	10	.444
Nebraska	5	–	11	.313	6	–	12	.333
Oklahoma	5	–	11	.313	6	–	12	.333
Grinnell	3	–	13	.188	3	–	13	.188
Kansas State	2	–	14	.125	2	–	14	.125

The 1922–23 Iowa State Cyclones men's basketball team (also known informally as Ames) represented Iowa State University during the 1922–23 NCAA men's basketball season. The Cyclones were coached by Bill Chandler, who was in his second season with the Cyclones. They played their home games at the State Gymnasium in Ames, Iowa.

They finished the season 10–8, 9–7 in Missouri Valley play to finish in fourth place.

== Roster ==
1922–23 Iowa State Cyclones men's basketball team
Players
Coaches

Pos.	#	Name	Height	Weight	Year	Hometown
G		J.K. Baldwin	—	—	Jr
C		H.C. Butcher	—	—	Jr
C		F.F. Diwoky	—	—
F		C.A. Fegtly	—	—	So
		Reese "Pinky" Greene (C)	—	—	Sr
C		Olene Jacobson	—	—	So
C		Tanner Jacobson	—	—	So
		W.L. "Red" Lane	—	—	Sr
F		J.A. McKinley	—	—	So
G		R.E. Moser	—	—	So
F		C.W. Paige	—	—	Jr
F		R.E. Paxton	—	—	Jr
		Leonard Raff	—	—	So
F		E.G. Reid	—	—	Jr
C		D.F. Roberts	—	—	Jr
G		Guy Roberts	—	—	So
G		F.J. Rutter	—	—	Jr
F		P.S. Schoppe	—	—	Jr
F		C.R. Sherk	—	—	Sr
G		R.A. Wilhelm	—	—	So
G		Ira Young	—	—	Jr

Head coach

- Bill Chandler

Assistant coach(es)

Legend

- (C) Team captain
- (S) Suspended
- (I) Ineligible
- (W) Walk-on
- Injured
- Current redshirt

== Schedule and results ==
Date time, TV	Rank^{#}	Opponent^{#}	Result	Record	Site city, state
Regular season
December 15, 1922*		Cornell	L 24–31	0–1	State Gymnasium; Ames, Iowa
January 2, 1923*		Simpson	W 40–15	1–1	State Gymnasium; Ames, Iowa
January 6, 1923		at Oklahoma	W 29–18	2–1 (1–0)	Norman, Oklahoma
January 8, 1923		at Kansas	L 12–22	2–2 (1–1)	Robinson Gymnasium; Lawrence, Kansas
January 11, 1923		Kansas	L 17–37	2–3 (1–2)	State Gymnasium; Ames, Iowa
January 17, 1923		Grinnell	W 26–12	3–3 (2–2)	State Gymnasium; Ames, Iowa
January 20, 1923		Missouri	L 25–41	3–4 (2–3)	State Gymnasium; Ames, Iowa
January 26, 1923		Nebraska	L 15–21	3–5 (2–4)	State Gymnasium; Ames, Iowa
January 30, 1923; 8:30 pm		at Drake; Iowa Big Four	W 29–27	4–5 (3–4)	Des Moines Coliseum; Des Moines, Iowa
February 3, 1923		at Nebraska	W 21–17	5–5 (4–4)	State Fairgrounds Coliseum; Lincoln, Nebraska
February 5, 1923		at Kansas State	W 22–14	6–5 (5–4)	Nichols Hall; Manhattan, Kansas
February 9, 1923		at Missouri	L 22–35	6–6 (5–5)	Rothwell Gymnasium; Columbia, Missouri
February 10, 1923		at Washington (MO)	L 18–24	6–7 (5–6)	Francis Gymnasium; St. Louis, Missouri
February 12, 1923		Oklahoma	W 24–19	7–7 (6–6)	State Gymnasium; Ames, Iowa
February 16, 1923		Washington (MO)	W 28–17	8–7 (7–6)	State Gymnasium; Ames, Iowa
February 21, 1923		Drake; Iowa Big Four	L 19–32	8–8 (7–7)	State Gymnasium; Ames, Iowa
February 27, 1923		at Grinnell	W 26–17	9–8 (8–7)	Grinnell, Iowa
March 1, 1923		Kansas State	W 14–12	10–8 (9–7)	State Gymnasium; Ames, Iowa
*Non-conference game. ^{#}Rankings from AP poll. (#) Tournament seedings in parentheses. All times are in Central Time.
