= Bill Chandler =

American basketball and baseball coach

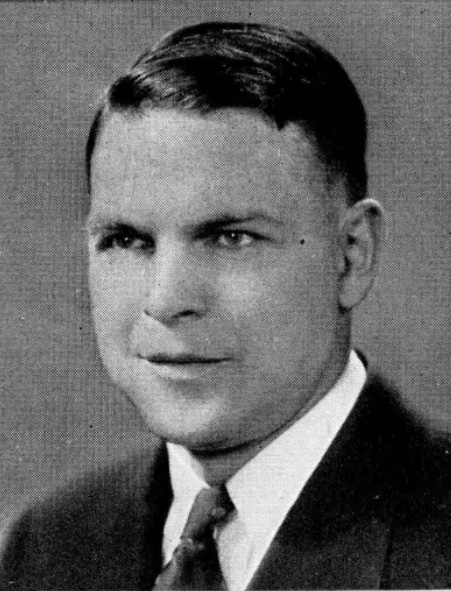
- Chandler from the 1939 Hilltop

Biographical details
- Born: August 27, 1895; Chicago, Illinois, U.S.
- Died: May 23, 1953 (aged 57); Wauwatosa, Wisconsin, U.S.

Playing career

Basketball
- 1915–1918: Wisconsin
- Position: Center

Coaching career (HC unless noted)

Basketball
- 1919–1921: River Falls State
- 1921–1928: Iowa State
- 1928–1930: Wisconsin (assistant)
- 1930–1951: Marquette

Baseball
- 1923–1928: Iowa State

Head coaching record
- Overall: 260–290 (basketball); 41–50 (baseball)

Accomplishments and honors

Awards
- National Player of the Year (1918); 2× All-American (1916, 1918)

William Stephen Chandler (August 27, 1895 – May 23, 1953) was an American basketball and baseball coach. He served as the head basketball coach at River Falls State Normal School—now known as the University of Wisconsin–River Falls—from 1919 to 1921, Iowa State University from 1921 to 1928, and Marquette University from 1930 to 1951, compiling a career college basketball coaching record of 260–290. Chandler was also the head baseball coach at Iowa State from 1923 to 1928, tallying a mark of 41–50.

== Biography ==
=== Early life ===
Chandler played basketball at the University of Wisconsin–Madison and was a center on the 1915–16 and 1917–18 teams, both of which finished in first place in the Big Ten Conference.

=== Coaching career ===
Chandler's first head coaching job was at the University of Wisconsin–River Falls. During his two seasons (1919–21), he compiled a 27–7 record.

Chandler coached at Iowa State for seven seasons (1921–28) and later coached Marquette basketball for 21 seasons (1930–51). His 193 victories are second all-time behind Al McGuire. Chandler was president of the National Association of Basketball Coaches in 1938 and was instrumental in forming the NCAA basketball tournament. His best years came in 1932–33 when he directed the squad to a mark of 14–3 and in the following campaign when Marquette compiled a 15–4 record. He died of a heart attack in 1953.

=== Awards ===
Chandler is a member of Marquette University's M Club Hall of Fame.

In 2018, Chandler was inducted into Wisconsin's UW Athletics Hall of Fame.

== Head coaching record ==
=== Basketball ===
Record table
Season	Team	Overall	Conference	Standing	Postseason
River Falls State Falcons (Inter-Normal Athletic Conference of Wisconsin) (1919–1921)
1919–20	River Falls State	14–3		1st	
1920–21	River Falls State	13–4			
River Falls State:		27–7			
Iowa State Cyclones (Missouri Valley Conference) (1921–1928)
1921–22	Iowa State	10–8	8–8	T–4th	
1922–23	Iowa State	10–8	9–7	4th	
1923–24	Iowa State	2–16	2–14	9th	
1924–25	Iowa State	2–15	1–15	9th	
1925–26	Iowa State	4–14	3–11	9th	
1926–27	Iowa State	9–9	7–8	8th	
1927–28	Iowa State	3–15	3–15	10th	
Iowa State:		40–85	33–78		
Marquette Warriors (Independent) (1930–1951)
1930–31	Marquette	11–7			
1931–32	Marquette	11–8			
1932–33	Marquette	14–3			
1933–34	Marquette	15–4			
1934–35	Marquette	11–7			
1935–36	Marquette	7–12			
1936–37	Marquette	8–8			
1937–38	Marquette	14–5			
1938–39	Marquette	12–5			
1939–40	Marquette	7–9			
1940–41	Marquette	2–13			
1941–42	Marquette	6–11			
1942–43	Marquette	9–10			
1943–44	Marquette	8–6			
1944–45	Marquette	7–10			
1945–46	Marquette	11–7			
1946–47	Marquette	9–14			
1947–48	Marquette	9–15			
1948–49	Marquette	8–13			
1949–50	Marquette	6–17			
1950–51	Marquette	8–14			
Marquette:		193–198			
Total:		260–290			
National champion Postseason invitational champion Conference regular season champion Conference regular season and conference tournament champion Division regular season champion Division regular season and conference tournament champion Conference tournament champion
