= Joseph S. Ward =

American civil engineer (1925–1994)

- Born: January 23, 1925; New York City, U.S.
- Died: January 10, 1994 (aged 68); Stuart, Florida, U.S.
- Burial place: Holy Cross Cemetery; North Arlington, New Jersey, U.S.
- Education: Manhattan College (BCE); Rutgers University (MS)
- Spouse: Ellin Barrington Callahan (m. 1951)
- Children: 11
- Engineering career
- Discipline: Geotechnical engineering; Forensic engineering
- Practice name: Joseph S. Ward, Inc./Joseph S. Ward and Associates (1950–1978); Converse Ward Davis Dixon/Converse Consultants (1978–1983); Joseph S. Ward, P.E. (1983–1994)

Joseph S. Ward (January 23, 1925 – January 10, 1994) was an American civil engineer and an expert in forensic engineering related to foundations and underground construction. He twice operated his own private consulting practice, with his first firm focusing on geotechnical engineering and his second firm specializing in forensic engineering. Ward served as president of the American Society of Civil Engineers in 1980 and was a founding member of the National Academy of Forensic Engineers, serving as the sixth president of the group in 1988.

== Early life and education ==
Joseph Simeon Ward was born in New York City on January 23, 1925 to Joseph S. Ward and Kathryn Winkler Ward. He was given his middle name of Simeon by his father, who had been born on the feast day of Saint Simeon. The elder Joseph S. Ward had a real estate business and for a time also served as the president of Thomas Ward Coal Company, which had been founded by his father in 1888 and was acquired in 1931 by Stephens Fuel Company; he was a member of the Real Estate Board of New York, New York Athletic Club and Winged Foot Golf Club.

Ward's father hoped he would join his real estate firm, but he became interested in engineering while attending the De La Salle Institute. He then went to Manhattan College, where he served as president of the student council and received a Bachelor of Civil Engineering (BCE) degree in 1946. Ward obtained a master's degree in civil engineering from Rutgers University in 1948. He also worked towards a doctorate degree at Columbia University from 1950 to 1952 and took additional graduate courses at Purdue University in 1968.

== Career ==
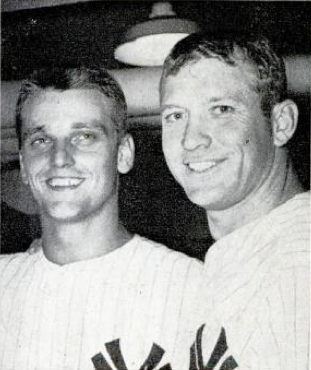
The M&M Boys in 1961

In 1948, Ward began serving on the faculty of Cooper Union and also decided to switch his focus in civil engineering from the field of structural engineering to soil mechanics. When Cooper Union was asked by Max Kase, the sports editor of the New York Journal-American, to test baseballs used by the American League in the 1952 and 1953 seasons, Ward was serving as an assistant professor in the institute's civil engineering department and also headed its materials testing laboratory. Along with his colleague Joseph M. DeSalvo, Ward performed tests on the balls and found that those from 1953 could travel about eight percent further with the same applied force compared to those from the prior season. During the summer of 1961, when Roger Maris and Mickey Mantle—the M&M Boys of the New York Yankees—were threatening to break Babe Ruth's home run record, Ward was working full-time as a private consultant. His firm was asked by Sports Illustrated to perform tests on 1961 baseballs, comparing them to the results of the tests he had previously performed at Cooper Union, and he found the balls to be heavier, firmer and livelier compared to those tested in the prior decade.

Ward formed his own business in 1950, serving as a geotechnical engineering consultant. He began his practice—primarily a one-man operation—working out of his home. In 1956, his firm moved into an office in Upper Montclair, New Jersey and opened a soil testing laboratory in Little Falls, which coincided with the time when Ward and DeSalvo left their faculty positions at Cooper Union to begin work together full-time as private consultants. Two years later, Joseph S. Ward, Inc. consolidated its operations into a two-story house in Caldwell, which was subsequently expanded in 1961 to accommodate the growing company that also had an affiliated office in Philadelphia. That same year, DeSalvo was named as a partner of the firm of Joseph S. Ward and Associates, having worked at the company since 1952 and previously serving as its chief engineer. Some of the firm's early work involved projects associated with the New York World's Fair and land reclamation in the Hackensack Meadows.

In 1965, Ward completed his second trip to the Middle East to investigate prospects for American business and investment. Later that same year, he was appointed by New Jersey governor Richard J. Hughes to serve on a nine-person team of consulting engineers on a 30-day trade mission to six African nations. In addition to working on projects throughout the United States, Ward's firm also became involved in projects abroad, including locations in Brazil, Argentina and Southeast Asia. In 1969, the company merged with Welch & Associates, a firm of consulting engineers and geologists in Summit, retaining its original name. That same year, the firm awarded scholarships to students at West Essex High School and James Caldwell High School interested in pursuing careers as engineers or scientists.

Joseph S. Ward and Associates merged with Converse Davis Dixon Associates in 1978 to form Converse Ward Davis Dixon. Ward became the president of the new company following the merger. He was later named the chief executive officer of the firm in 1981, which was headquartered in Pasadena, California. Ward had planned to retire when he left Converse Consultants (the successor of Converse Ward Davis Dixon) in 1983, but found it hard to give up his involvement with projects. He opened up his own firm in Montclair that same year, Joseph S. Ward, P.E., which specialized in forensic engineering. Ward was considered to be an expert in forensic engineering and determining the cause of failures associated with foundations and underground construction, serving as an expert witness in many cases related to construction failures. In 1985, he decided to expand the services provided by his practice to include management consulting services catered for engineering firms.

In addition to serving as an assistant professor at Cooper Union, Ward also served as a faculty member in the civil engineering departments of Rutgers University and the Stevens Institute of Technology. He was licensed as a professional engineer in 20 jurisdictions (including the District of Columbia and Virgin Islands) and as a land surveyor in the states of New York and New Jersey.

== Professional societies and awards ==
Ward became involved with the American Society of Civil Engineers (ASCE) while he was a sophomore at Manhattan College and served as the president of the chapter in his senior year. He was elected as the president of the ASCE Metropolitan Section in 1964, vice-president of ASCE in 1975, president-elect of ASCE in 1978, and took office as president of the national society in October 1979. During his terms as president-elect and president of ASCE, he traveled to China and Taiwan in 1979 and 1980, respectively, where he met with civil engineers, visited civil engineering structures, and observed design and construction activities to investigate potential opportunities for American engineers and contractors. In January 1980, following the Soviet Invasion of Afghanistan, Ward canceled a trip he had planned to Russia in September of that year and led ASCE to pass a resolution cutting off the exchange of information between engineers in the United States and the Soviet Union until the Soviets withdrew their troops from Afghanistan. Ward was also vocal about the lack of attention given by the Carter administration in listening to recommendations from engineers to develop policies related to the energy crisis.

Ward was elected as president of the Consulting Engineers Council of New Jersey in 1968. He was a founding member of the National Academy of Forensic Engineers (NAFE) and was elected as the sixth president of NAFE in 1988. Ward was elected as chairman of the Institute for Professional Practice in 1992. He also was a member of the American Arbitration Association, American Consulting Engineers Council, American Society for Engineering Education, American Society for Testing and Materials, Association of Engineering Firms Practicing in the Geosciences, Association of Soil and Foundation Engineers, Construction Specifications Institute, Deep Foundations Institute, Institution of Engineers of Ireland, Montclair Society of Engineers, National Society of Professional Engineers, New York Building Congress, and Transportation Research Board.

In 1987, Ward was named the Civil Engineer of the Year by the ASCE Metropolitan Section and received the Membership Recognition Award from the Consulting Engineers Council of New Jersey. He received an honorary doctorate from Manhattan College in 1988 and was also named an Outstanding Engineering Graduate of Manhattan College in 1992. Ward was the recipient of the Forensic Engineering Award from ASCE in 1992.

== Personal life and death ==
He married Ellin Barrington Callahan in January 1951 at St. Aloysius Church in Jersey City, New Jersey. The couple had 11 children, five daughters and six sons. They had resided in Montclair since 1953. Beginning in 1960, the family also had a summer home in Normandy Beach on the Jersey Shore.

At the time of his marriage, Ward was a member of the New York Athletic Club. He later served on the board of trustees for St. Vincent's Hospital in Montclair for 14 years and was the chairman of the board from 1968 to 1971.

Ward and his wife moved to Stuart, Florida in 1990. He died of a heart attack at his home on January 10, 1994. Ward was buried at Holy Cross Cemetery in North Arlington, New Jersey. The American Society of Civil Engineers Scholarship at Manhattan College, established in 2011, recognizes Joseph S. Ward and Arthur J. Fox Jr., who both graduated from the college and went on to serve as the national president of ASCE.

== Publications ==
- Ward, Joseph S. (April 1962). "Foundation Economy Through Soils Engineering". Consulting Engineer. 18 (4): 124–127.
- Ward, Joseph S. (1965). "Starting a Consulting Business". Transactions of the American Society of Civil Engineers. 130: 7–8.
- Ward, Joseph S. (1966). "Starting Your Own Consulting Practice—Business and Finance". Transactions of the American Society of Civil Engineers. 131: 61–62.
- Ward, Joseph S. (1966). "Engineering Education—from the Practitioner's Viewpoint". Transactions of the American Society of Civil Engineers. 131: 147–149.
- Ward, J. (September 1973). "ASCE's Involvement in Pension Concepts". Civil Engineering. Vol. 43, no. 9. American Society of Civil Engineers. pp. 93–94.
- Ward, Joseph S. (April 1983). "Professional Schools: The Debate Continues". Journal of Professional Issues in Engineering. 109 (2): 136–142. doi:10.1061/(ASCE)1052-3928(1983)109:2(136).
- Ward, Joseph S. (1989). "The Engineer as Expert Witness". In Carper, Kenneth L. (ed.). Forensic Engineering. New York: Elsevier. ISBN 9780444013309.
