= Engineering News-Record =

American weekly trade magazine

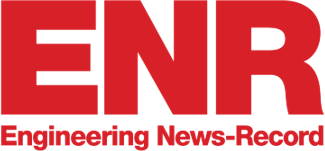

- Cover of the July 28, 2025 issue
- Editor-in-Chief: Scott Blair
- Frequency: Weekly
- Total circulation: 62,285 (2015)
- First issue: April 5, 1917; 109 years ago
- Company: BNP Media II, LLC
- Country: United States
- Based in: Manhattan, New York City, New York, U.S.
- Language: English
- Website: enr.com
- ISSN: 0891-9526

The Engineering News-Record (widely known as ENR) is an American weekly magazine that provides news, analysis, data and opinion for the construction industry worldwide. It is widely regarded as one of the construction industry's most authoritative publications and is considered by many to be the "bible" of the industry. It is owned by BNP Media.

The magazine's subscribers include contractors, project owners, engineers, architects, public works officials and industry suppliers. It covers the design and construction of high-rise buildings, stadiums, airports, long-span bridges, dams, tunnels, power plants, industrial plants, water and wastewater projects, and toxic waste cleanup projects. It also covers the construction industry's financial, legal, regulatory, safety, environmental, management, corporate and labor issues.

ENR annually ranks the largest contractors and design firms in the U.S. and internationally. Its "construction economics" section covers the cost fluctuations of a wide range of building materials.

== History ==
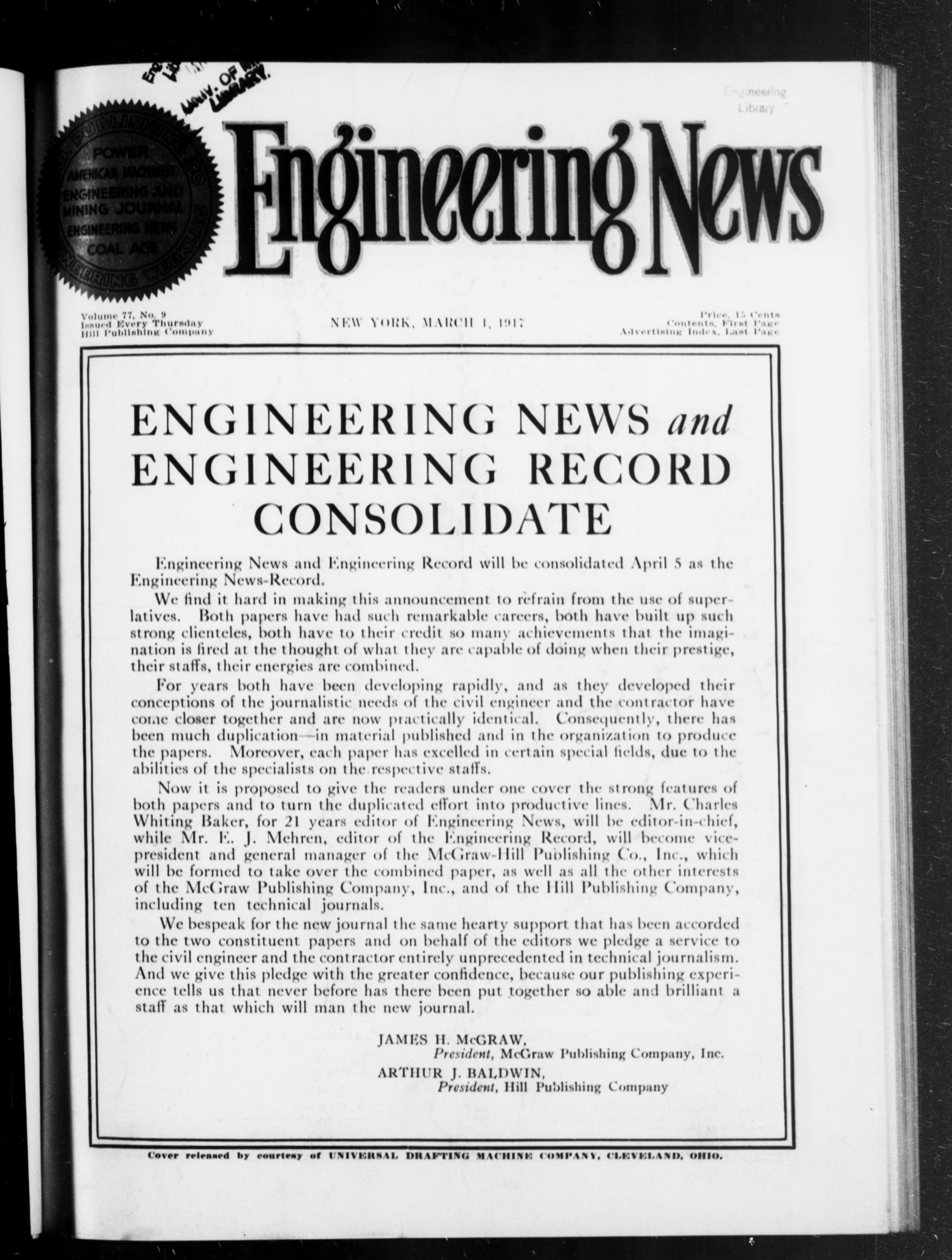
Engineering News announces merger with Engineering Record to form new publication (1917).

ENR traces its roots to two publications. The older magazine was first published as The Engineer and Surveyor in 1874. This publication was later renamed The Engineer, Architect and Surveyor, then Engineering News and American Railway Journal and eventually Engineering News. The second publication was first known as The Plumber and Sanitary Engineer. It was later renamed The Sanitary Engineer, then Engineering and Building Record, and finally Engineering Record with Frank W. Skinner as its editor (1888–1914). In 1917, Engineering News and Engineering Record merged to become the magazine that is published today, Engineering News-Record with E.J. Mehren as its editor until 1924. Long-tenured editor-in-chiefs of the magazine have included Waldo G. Bowman (1940–1963), Arthur J. Fox Jr. (1964–1988), and Jan Tuchman (2001–2022).

=== Ownership ===
The Engineer and Surveyor was founded by George H. Frost, who sold the successor journal, Engineering News, to the John Alexander Hill and the Hill Publishing Company in 1911. The Plumber and Sanitary Engineer was founded by Henry C. Meyer, who sold the successor Engineering Record to James H. McGraw and the McGraw Publishing Company. In 1917, following the death of Hill, McGraw merged the two companies to form McGraw-Hill Publishing. The successor parent company is McGraw Hill Financial.

On September 22, 2014, McGraw-Hill divested the subsidiary McGraw-Hill Construction to Symphony Technology Group for US$320 million. The sale included Engineering News-Record, Architectural Record, Dodge and Sweet's. McGraw-Hill Construction has been renamed Dodge Data & Analytics.

On July 1, 2015, the magazine was sold to BNP Media, along with Architectural Record and SNAP (a bi-monthly print product associated with Sweet's).

== ENR rankings ==
Engineering News-Record compiles and publishes rankings of the largest construction and engineering firms annually, measured by gross revenues.

The rankings include the largest 400 U.S. general contractors, the largest 500 U.S. design firms (architectural and engineering firms), the largest 600 U.S. specialty contractors, the largest 100 construction management firms, the largest 100 design-build firms, the largest 200 environmental engineering firms, the largest 40 program management firms, the largest 225 international design firms, and the largest 250 international contractors, based on general construction contracting export revenue—generated from projects outside each firm's respective home country, and the largest 250 Global Contractors, both publicly and privately held, based on total construction contracting revenue regardless of where the projects were located. Since well over 90 percent of these firms are privately owned, most of the financial breakouts contained in these ranking tables are not available elsewhere.

== ENR Award of Excellence ==
The editors of Engineering News-Record collectively decide each year to recognize 25 individuals who they feel have served the best interests of the construction industry and the public. To be eligible, a person, or the project they worked on, must have been covered in the pages of the magazine or the magazine's website. No outside nominations are allowed. The 25 award recipients, called "Newsmakers", receive brief write-ups in the first issue in January.

After choosing the 25 Newsmakers, the editors then pick the single Newsmaker they feel has made the most significant contribution during the year, and designate that person to receive the ENR Award of Excellence. The Newsmakers and the Award of Excellence recipient are all recognized at a black-tie gala held each year in New York City in March or April, considered to be the premier event for the engineering and construction industry.

The Newsmaker awards, which were originally called Marksmen awards, have been issued annually since 1964. The Award of Excellence, originally called the Man of the Year award, has been issued annually since 1966. Award of Excellence recipients include Robert Boyd, who brought engineering and managing excellence to Hydro-Québec's $15-billion James Bay Project, Fazlur Khan, avant-garde designer of tall buildings, and Vinton Bacon, whose fearless fight against graft in the Metropolitan Water Reclamation District of Greater Chicago brought an attempt on his life.

== ENR's economic data ==
Engineering News-Record, as a service to its readers, compiles and publishes an extensive amount of data on building material prices and construction labor costs. Each month it publishes prices for 67 different building materials, in each of 20 major U.S. cities. The first weekly issue each month contains a table of cement, ready-mix concrete, and aggregate (crushed stone) prices, the second weekly issue contains a table of pipe prices, the third issue contains lumber, plywood, drywall, and insulation prices, and the fourth issue contains steel and other metal product prices.

A small amount of this data is then used to calculate two monthly index figures, the Construction Cost Index and the Building Cost Index. Both indexes are calculated using a formula made up of fixed amounts of four components—Portland cement, 2x4 lumber, structural steel (steel beams), and labor. The only difference between the two indexes is in their labor component. The labor component of the Construction Cost Index is common (unskilled) labor, while the labor component of the Building Cost Index is skilled labor.

The Construction Cost Index has been issued since 1908, while the Building Cost Index has been issued since 1915. Each index is widely used throughout the U.S. construction industry as a benchmark for measuring inflation.

The ENR cost indexes were created in 1921 and overseen for many years by ENR's director of market surveys, Elsie Eaves.
