= Herb Bunker =

American college athlete, coach and administrator

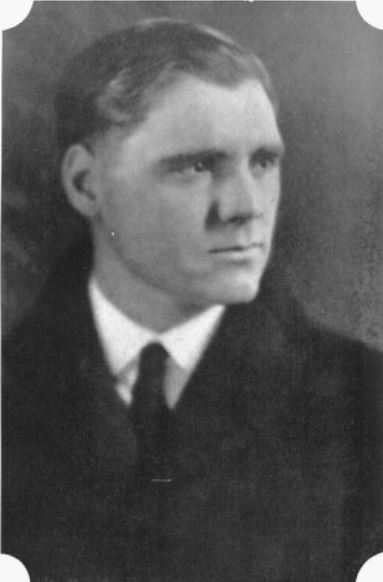
- Bunker as a senior at Missouri

Biographical details
- Born: August 24, 1896; Nevada, Missouri, U.S.
- Died: December 6, 1980 (aged 84); Columbia, Missouri, U.S.

Playing career

Football
- 1920–1922: Missouri

Basketball
- 1920–1923: Missouri

Baseball
- 1921–1923: Missouri

Coaching career (HC unless noted)

Football
- 1923–1924: Missouri (freshmen)
- 1924–1925: Auburn (assistant)
- 1925–1926: Florida (assistant)
- 1928–1936: Culver–Stockton

Basketball
- 1923–1924: Missouri (freshmen)
- 1924–1925: Auburn

Administrative career (AD unless noted)
- 1928–1937: Culver–Stockton

Head coaching record
- Overall: 26–36–6 (football)

Accomplishments and honors

Awards
- 3× All-American – Helms (1921–1923); 3× All-MVC (1921–1923)

Herbert Bunker (August 24, 1896 – December 6, 1980) was an American college athlete, coach and administrator. He played four varsity sports at the University of Missouri, earning All-America honors in basketball for all three of his varsity seasons. He then went on to coach football and basketball at several schools, later becoming the head football coach and athletic director at Culver–Stockton College.

Bunker was born in Nevada, Missouri, and attended the University of Missouri, where he earned varsity letters in football, basketball, baseball and track. It was in basketball where Bunker distinguished himself the most, earning All-Missouri Valley Conference three times. In 1943, the Helms Athletic Foundation retroactively named Bunker to All-America teams for each of these three years. Following his college career, Bunker served as freshman coach for football and basketball at his alma mater. He was hired as assistant football and head basketball coach at Auburn University in 1924. After a short stint as an assistant football coach at Florida, he became head football coach and athletic director at Culver–Stockton College. He later was head of the physical education department at his alma mater.

Bunker died on December 6, 1980, in Columbia, Missouri.

== Head coaching record ==
=== Football ===
Year	Team	Overall	Conference	Standing	Bowl/playoffs
Culver–Stockton Wildcats (Missouri College Athletic Union) (1928–1936)
1928	Culver–Stockton	1–5–1	1–4	T–8th	
1929	Culver–Stockton	0–7–1	0–4–1	9th	
1930	Culver–Stockton	4–2–1	0–1–1	7th	
1931	Culver–Stockton	2–5–1	0–1–1	7th	
1932	Culver–Stockton	4–3	0–1	7th	
1933	Culver–Stockton	5–1	1–1	3rd	
1934	Culver–Stockton	3–5	1–3	T–4th	
1935	Culver–Stockton	2–4–2	0–3	5th	
1936	Culver–Stockton	5–4	1–2	4th	
Culver–Stockton:		26–36–6	4–20–3		
Total:		26–36–6			
