= 1921–22 Missouri Tigers men's basketball team =

American college basketball season

1921–22 Missouri Tigers men's basketball
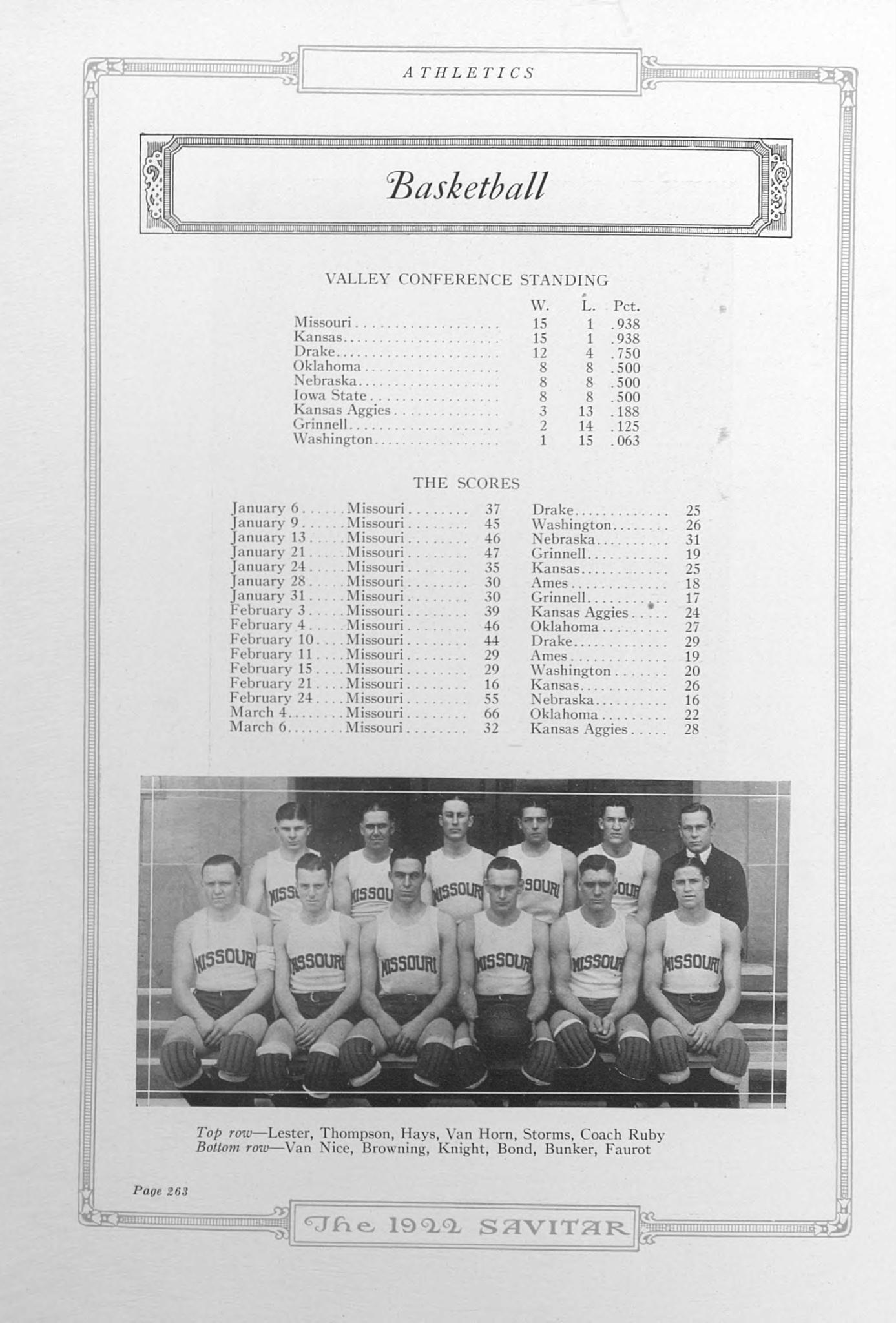
- Conference: Missouri Valley Conference
- Record: 16–1 (15–1 MVIAA)
- Head coach: J. Craig Ruby (2nd season)

1921–22 Missouri Valley Intercollegiate Athletic Association men's basketball standings
	Conf.				Overall
Team	W		L	PCT	W		L	PCT
Missouri	15	–	1	.938	16	–	1	.941
Kansas	15	–	1	.938	16	–	2	.889
Drake	12	–	4	.750	14	–	4	.778
Iowa State	8	–	8	.500	10	–	8	.556
Oklahoma	8	–	8	.500	9	–	9	.500
Nebraska	8	–	8	.500	8	–	9	.471
Kansas State	3	–	13	.188	3	–	14	.176
Grinnell	2	–	14	.125	5	–	14	.263
Washington University	1	–	15	.063	1	–	18	.053

The 1921–22 Missouri Tigers men's basketball team represented the University of Missouri in intercollegiate basketball during the 1921–22 season. The team finished the season with a 16–1 record and was retroactively listed as the top team of the 1921–22 season by the Premo-Porretta Power Poll. It was head coach Craig Ruby's second and final season coaching the team.
