= Waldo G. Bowman =

American magazine editor (1900–1995)

- Born: September 26, 1900; Lawrence, Kansas, U.S.
- Died: June 6, 1995 (aged 94); Chapel Hill, North Carolina, U.S.
- Burial place: Oak Hill Cemetery; Lawrence, Kansas, U.S.
- Education: University of Kansas (BS, CE)
- Spouse: Virginia M. Pendleton (m. 1927)
- Children: 2

Waldo G. Bowman (September 26, 1900 – June 6, 1995) was an American magazine editor. He was employed by Engineering News-Record for 40 years as both an editor and publisher; Bowman was the magazine's editor-in-chief from 1940 to 1963 and was responsible for expanding the publication's international coverage of business and technical news. He was president of the American Society of Civil Engineers in 1964.

== Early life and education ==
Waldo Gleason Bowman was born in Lawrence, Kansas on September 26, 1900, to Charles Otto Bowman and Alice Joanna Gleason.

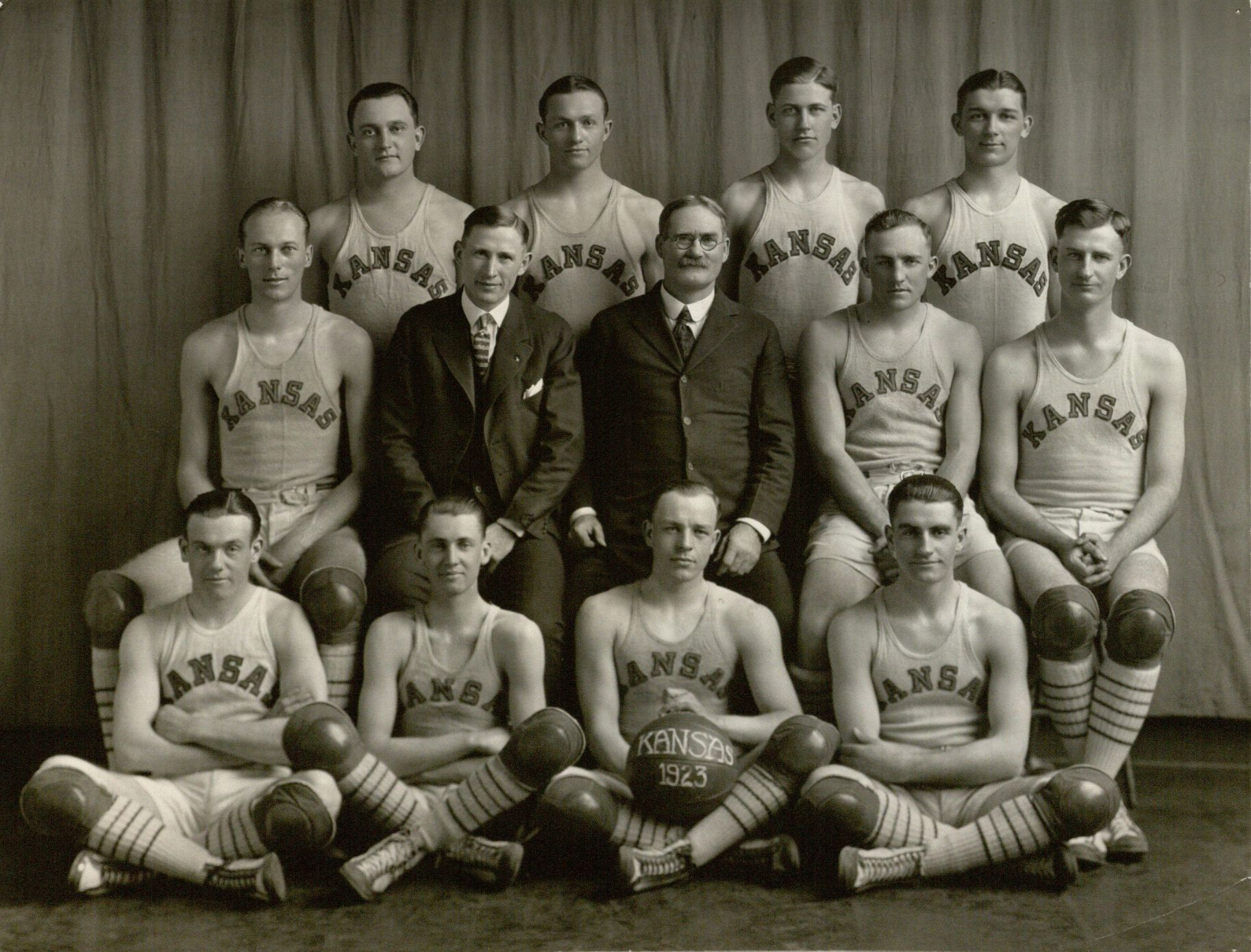
1922–23 Kansas Jayhawks men's basketball team, showing Bowman seated in the front row, second from the left.

He attended college at the University of Kansas, where he was a member of the Jayhawks men's basketball team, the Sigma Nu fraternity, and served as first vice-president of the student council in his senior year. (Note: Bowman played for the men's basketball team during the 1921–22 and 1922–23 seasons; these teams were retroactively named as national champions by the Helms Athletic Foundation.) He graduated with a Bachelor of Science (BS) degree in civil engineering in May 1923.

Feeling that he should also have a background in business, he enrolled at the Harvard Business School in the fall of 1924, where he took postgraduate courses. Bowman later earned a Civil Engineering (CE) degree from the University of Kansas in 1947, writing his thesis on American military engineering in the European and Mediterranean theaters of World War II.

== Career ==
During his time as an undergraduate at the University of Kansas, Bowman had summer jobs as a rodman and timekeeper for the Union Pacific Railroad (1919), a draftsman for an industrial survey of Kansas for the University of Kansas School of Engineering (1920), a materials tester of reinforced steel and concrete for the state of Kansas (1921), and a surveyor and inspector for O'Neil Construction Company in Leavenworth, Kansas (1922).

Bowman had originally intended to pursue a career in the civil engineering profession. After graduating from college, he began working in June 1923 for the Chicago Bridge and Iron Works, where he worked as a structural designer until October 1924. He was employed as a draftsman for the Boston Bridge Works from December 1924 through April 1925. However, Bowman was running out of money during graduate school and he applied for a position listed in Engineering News-Record, a magazine that he had a high regard for when he was an undergraduate, noting that he learned more from reading that publication than he did from his college textbooks.

In April 1925, Bowman began working as an assistant editor for Engineering News-Record. He provided reports on major construction projects that were completed during the 1930s including the Empire State Building, George Washington Bridge, and Golden Gate Bridge. Bowman became the editor-in-chief of the magazine in January 1940. He served as a war correspondent during World War II, providing on-site reporting from Western Europe, Northern Africa and the Middle East, including an account of the collapse of the Remagen Bridge in Germany. In 1947, he was asked by Robert Patterson, the United States Secretary of War, to join a group of newspaper editors to study the progress of reconstruction during Allied occupation of Germany.

As editor-in-chief of Engineering News-Record, Bowman expanded the magazine's coverage of international business and technical news from the construction industry. He continued to travel throughout the world to report on significant construction projects including the Aswan High Dam, Bratsk Hydroelectric Power Station, and Rance Tidal Power Station. In 1962, Bowman was a member of the United States delegation that attended the meeting of the International Commission on Large Dams in Moscow and participated in a two-week tour of dams sponsored by the Soviet Ministry of Power Stations.

Bowman served as editor-in-chief of Engineering News-Record until 1963, after which he became the publisher of Engineering News-Record and Construction Methods & Equipment. He retired as the publisher of both magazines in 1965 and continued to serve as a consulting editor for McGraw-Hill. He joined Black & Veatch in 1968, establishing the New York City office for the Kansas City-based consulting engineering firm. Bowman continued working at Black & Veatch until 1977.

== Professional societies and awards ==
Bowman became involved with the American Society of Civil Engineers (ASCE) while he was an undergraduate at the University of Kansas. In the fall of 1921, he served as the secretary of his university's ASCE student chapter, which had been organized that same year. Bowman was elected as president of the ASCE student chapter in his senior year of college. He later served as a national director of ASCE from 1949 to 1951 and became vice president of the national society in 1957, serving a two-year term. Bowman was installed as president of ASCE in October 1963.

He served as vice president of the American Institute of Consulting Engineers in 1972 and was a director of the Engineers Joint Council in 1950 and 1970. He also was a member of the International Commission on Large Dams and the United States Committee on Large Dams.

In 1951, Bowman was awarded a citation for distinguished service from the Alumni Association at the University of Kansas. (Note: The award had the same statue of an honorary degree. The University of Kansas did not begin presenting honorary degrees until 2012.) He was named the Civil Engineer of the Year by the ASCE Metropolitan Section in 1961.

== Personal life and death ==
Bowman married Virginia M. Pendleton in Lawrence, Kansas on October 12, 1927. His wife graduated from the University of Kansas in 1924. The couple resided in Douglaston, Queens before moving to Chapel Hill, North Carolina in 1982. They had two daughters.

Bowman died at his home in Chapel Hill on June 6, 1995.

== Publications ==
- Bowman, Waldo Gleason; Richardson, Harold Ward (1944). Bulldozers Come First: The Story of the U.S. War Construction in Foreign Lands. New York: McGraw-Hill.
- Bowman, Waldo Gleason (1945). American Military Engineering in Europe from Normandy to the Rhine. New York: McGraw-Hill.
