= Paul Endacott =

American basketball player

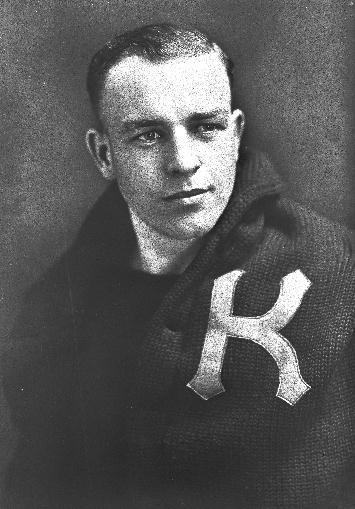

Personal information
- Born: July 13, 1902 Oklahoma City, Oklahoma, U.S.
- Died: January 8, 1997 (aged 94) Bartlesville, Oklahoma, U.S.
- Listed height: 5 ft 10 in (1.78 m)

Career information
- High school: Lawrence (Lawrence, Kansas)
- College: Kansas (1920–1923)
- Position: Guard

Career history
- 1924–1928: Phillips 66ers

Career highlights
- Helms Player of the Year (1923); 2× Consensus All-American (1922, 1923); 2× First-team All-MVC (1922, 1923); No. 12 retired by Kansas Jayhawks
- Basketball Hall of Fame
- Collegiate Basketball Hall of Fame

Paul Endacott (July 13, 1902 – January 8, 1997) was a collegiate basketball player in the 1920s. The Lawrence, Kansas native attended the University of Kansas from 1919 to 1923. Playing under Hall of Fame coach Phog Allen, Endacott led the 1921–1922 Jayhawks and the 1922–1923 Jayhawks to consecutive Helms Athletic Foundation national championships. In 1936, the Helms Foundation retroactively named him to the 1922 and 1923 All-American teams. He was also named the Helms Foundation Player of the Year for 1923. His No. 12 jersey is retired by the University of Kansas.

Following his collegiate career, he spent four years with the AAU Phillips Petroleum Company Team, from 1924 to 1928. He went on to serve as President of Phillips Petroleum in his later years. Endacott was inducted into the Naismith Memorial Basketball Hall of Fame as a player in 1972.
