= Charlie T. Black =

American basketball player and coach

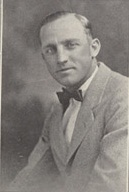
- Black from 1928 Cornhusker

Biographical details
- Born: January 5, 1901; Alton, Illinois, U.S.
- Died: December 14, 1988 (aged 87); Citrus Heights, California, U.S.

Playing career
- 1922–1924: Kansas
- Position: Guard

Coaching career (HC unless noted)
- 1924–1926: Grinnell
- 1926–1932: Nebraska

Head coaching record
- Overall: 51–57

Accomplishments and honors

Championships
- As a player—: 2× Helms Foundation National Champion; 3× Missouri Valley Conference

Awards
- As a player—: Helms National Player of the Year (1924); 2× NCAA All-American (1923, 1924); 2× All-MVC (1923, 1924); No. 8 retired by Kansas Jayhawks

Charles Terence Black (January 5, 1901 – December 14, 1988) was an American standout college basketball player for the University of Kansas in the early 1920s, and later the head coach for the University of Nebraska for six seasons.

== Basketball career ==
=== Player ===
Black enrolled at Kansas in the fall of 1920 and became eligible to play for the men's basketball team in his sophomore year of 1921–22. Playing for Hall of Fame coach Phog Allen, he helped guide the Jayhawks to three Missouri Valley Conference (MVC) championships and two retroactively named national championships during his three-year playing career. Kansas accumulated a 49–6 overall record (47–3 in conference play) while Black played for the team. He was a two-time all-conference, two-time All-American and one-time Helms Foundation National Player of the Year.

In 1921–22, the Jayhawks went 16–2 (15–1 MVC) to win their first of two consecutive national championships and first of six consecutive conference championships. It was their best record in seven years, and Black's ability at the guard position alongside Paul Endacott was the biggest reason for their success. The following year, Black's junior season, Kansas finished 17–1 (16–0 MVC). In 1923–24, his senior year, Kansas failed to win their third straight national championship when they finished 16–3. However, they finished 15–1 and claimed another Missouri Valley Conference title.

Black was named a Helms Foundation All-American in his final two seasons. Helms also honored him as their national player of the year following the 1923–24 season, making him the second player in a row from Kansas to be given that honor (Endacott earned it in 1922–23) and also the school's second overall recipient.

=== Coach ===
After finishing his playing career at Kansas, Black spent two seasons as the head men's basketball coach and an assistant football coach at Grinnell College. In 1926, he became the head coach for the men's basketball team at Nebraska. He served at this position from 1926–27 through 1931–32 and compiled an overall record of 51–57, including a 5–7 record against his alma mater.

Record table
Season	Team	Overall	Conference	Standing	Postseason
Nebraska Cornhuskers (Missouri Valley Conference) (1926–1928)
1926–27	Nebraska	12–6	7–5	4th	
1927–28	Nebraska	7–11	7–11	T-7th	
Nebraska Cornhuskers (Big 6 Conference) (1928–1932)
1928–29	Nebraska	11–5	5–5	3rd	
1929–30	Nebraska	10–8	6–4	3rd	
1930–31	Nebraska	9–9	6–4	2nd	
1931–32	Nebraska	3–17	2–8	6th	
Total:		51–57			
National champion Postseason invitational champion Conference regular season champion Conference regular season and conference tournament champion Division regular season champion Division regular season and conference tournament champion Conference tournament champion
