= Helms Foundation College Basketball Player of the Year =

Defunct U.S. men's college basketball player award (1943–1983)

- Awarded for: the national men's college basketball player of the year
- Country: United States
- Presented by: Helms Athletic Foundation

History
- First award: 1943 (Note: Retroactive awards for 1905 to 1942)
- Final award: 1983

The Helms Foundation College Basketball Player of the Year was an annual men's college basketball award given to the most outstanding men's player in the United States. It was awarded by the Helms Athletic Foundation, an organization founded in 1936 by Bill Schroeder and Paul Helms, the owner of Helms Bakery in Los Angeles.

The award was presented annually beginning in 1943, when the Helms Athletic Foundation announced Schroeder's player of the year selection for the 1942–43 season. Earlier that year, his retroactive picks for each season from 1919–20 to 1941–42 were released. Additional retroactive picks from 1904–05 to 1918–19 were released in 1957.

After Helms died in 1957, his family continued supporting the foundation until 1969, when the bakeries went out of business. Schroeder found a new benefactor in United Savings & Loan, and the foundation's name became United Savings–Helms Athletic Foundation. United merged with Citizens Savings & Loan in 1973, when the foundation became the Citizens Savings Athletic Foundation. It was again renamed when First Interstate Bank assumed sponsorship and was known as the First Interstate Bank Athletic Foundation in the award's final years after 1981. Schroeder made his last player of the year selection for the 1982–83 season, after which the award came to an end.

== Key ==
| † | Co-Players of the Year |
| Player (X) | Denotes the number of times the player has been awarded the Helms Player of the Year award at that point |

== Winners ==
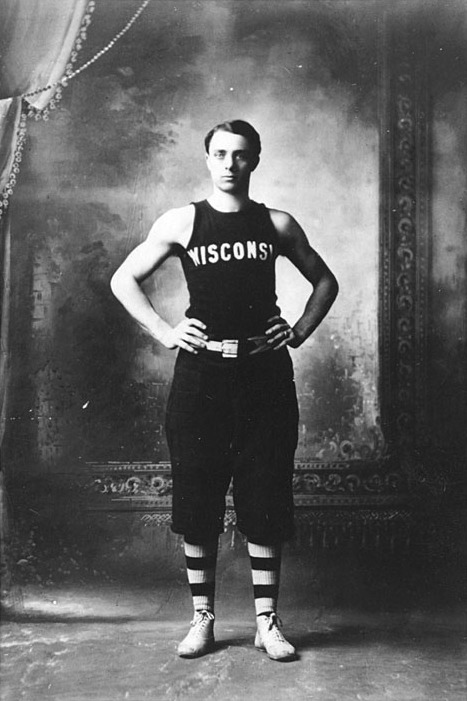
Christian Steinmetz, Wisconsin, 1905

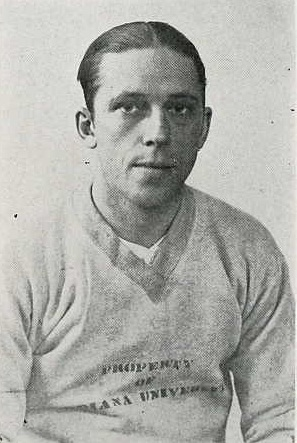
George Levis, Wisconsin, 1916

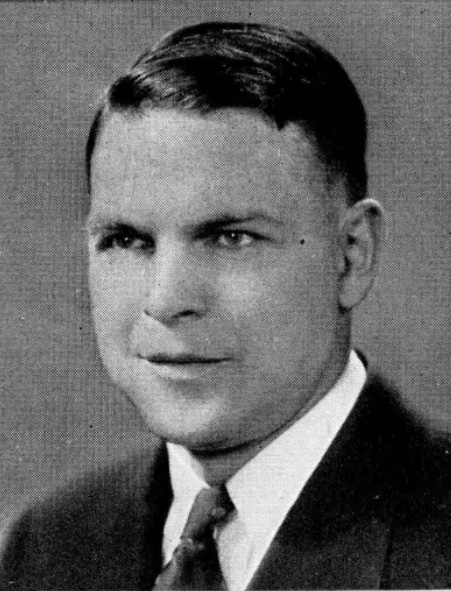
Bill Chandler, Wisconsin, 1918

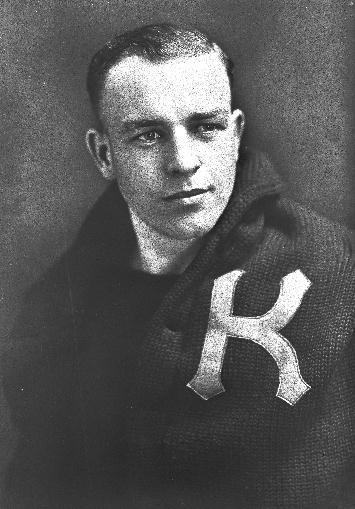
Paul Endacott, Kansas, 1923

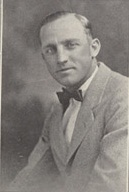
Charlie T. Black, Kansas, 1924

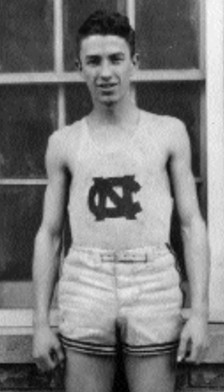
Jack Cobb, North Carolina, 1926

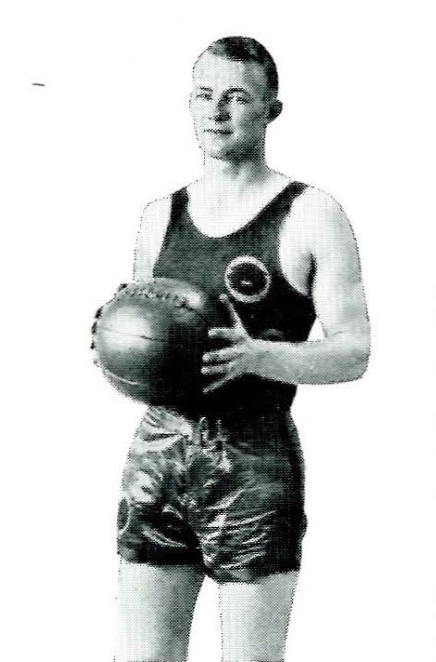
Cat Thompson, Montana State, 1929

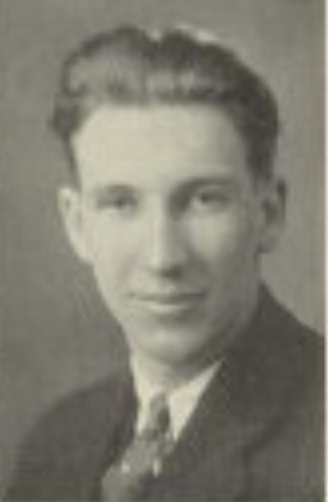
Charley Hyatt, Pittsburgh, 1930

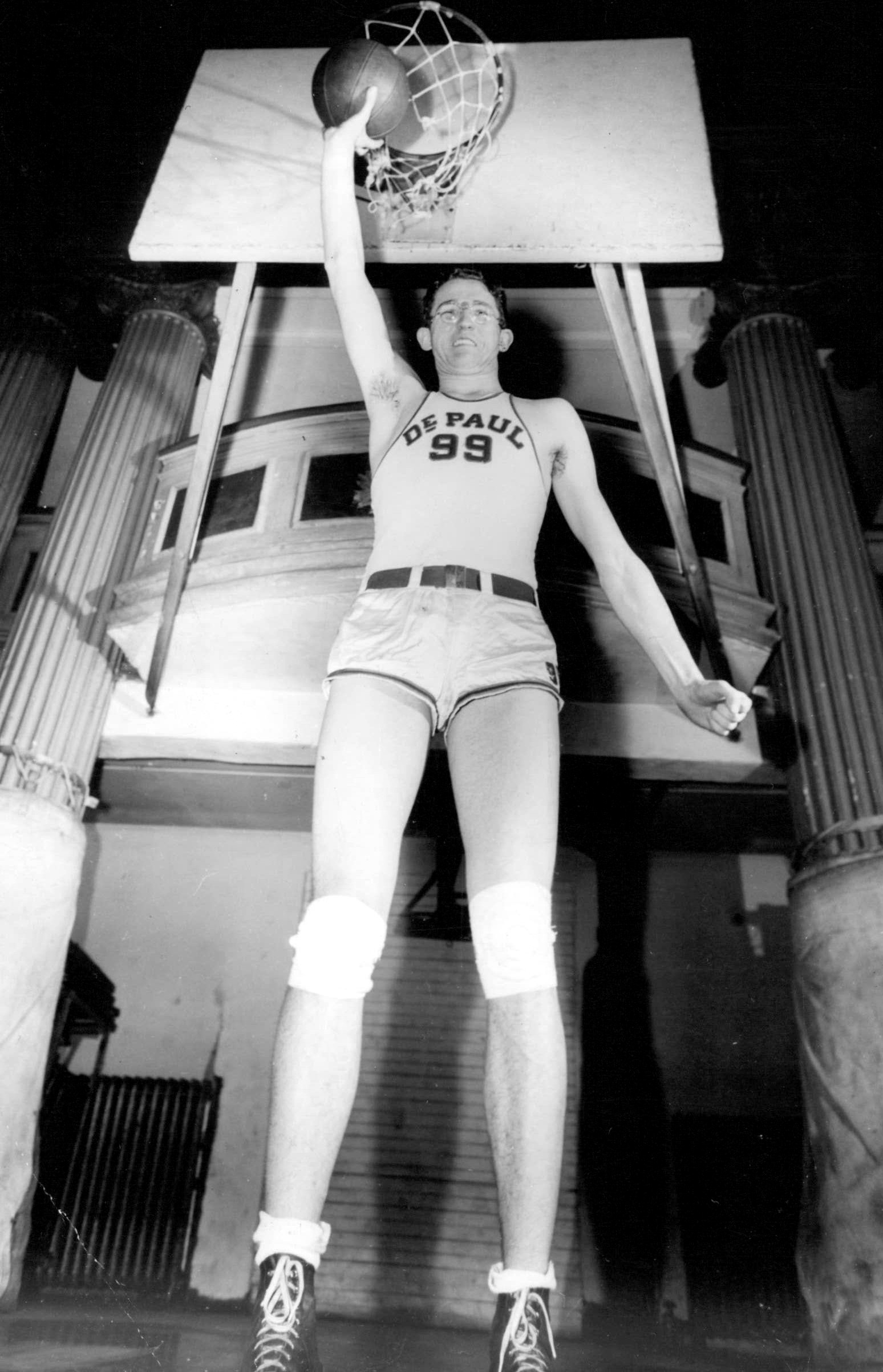
George Mikan, DePaul, 1944 and 1945

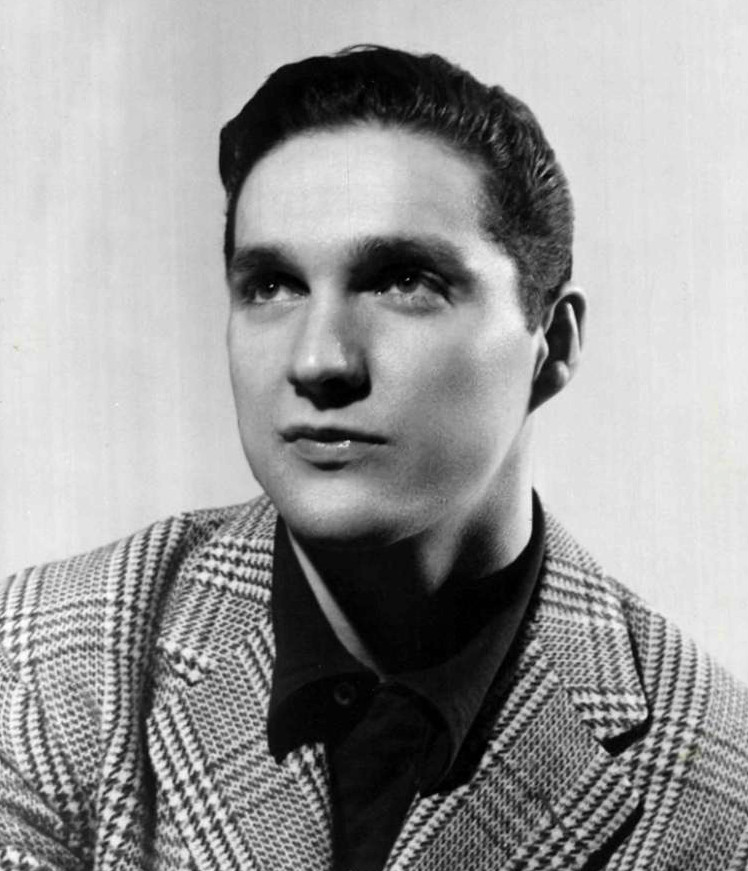
Tony Lavelli, Yale, 1949

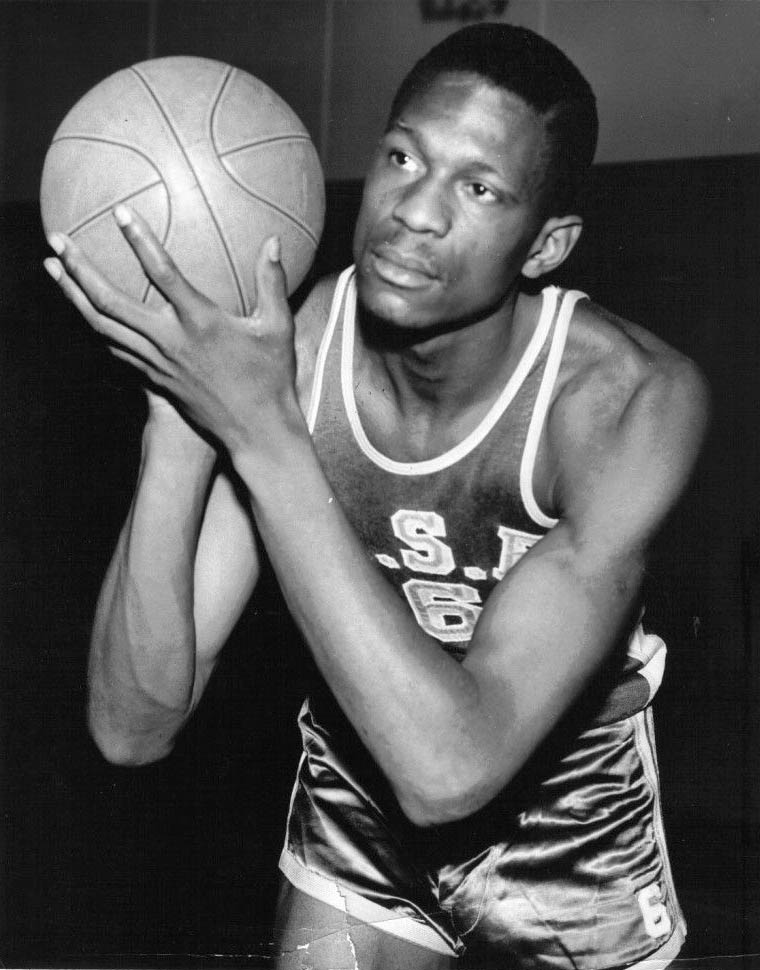
Bill Russell, San Francisco, 1955 and 1956

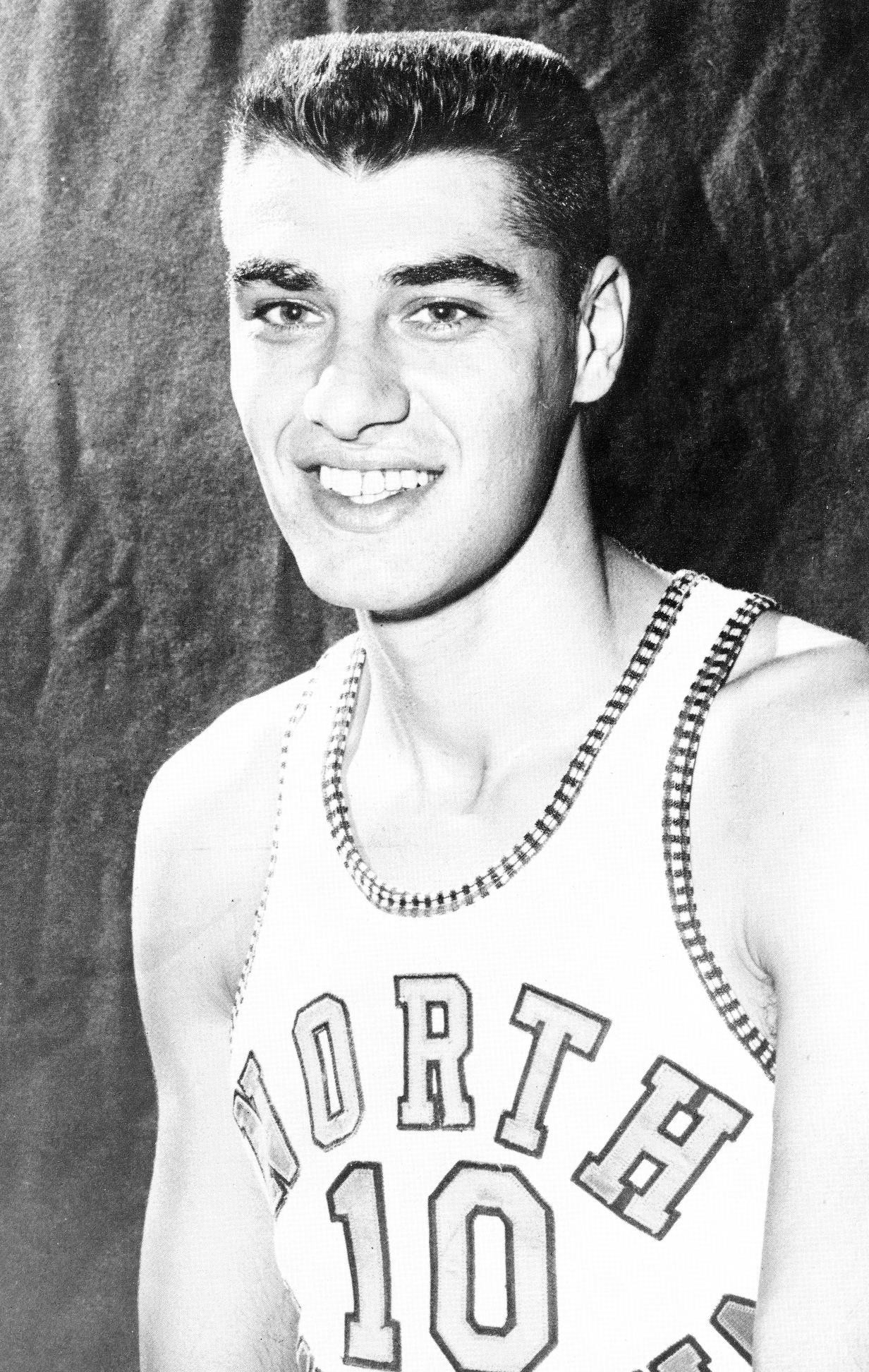
Lennie Rosenbluth, North Carolina, 1957

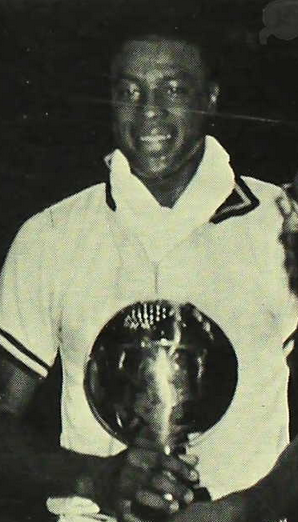
Cazzie Russell, Michigan, 1966

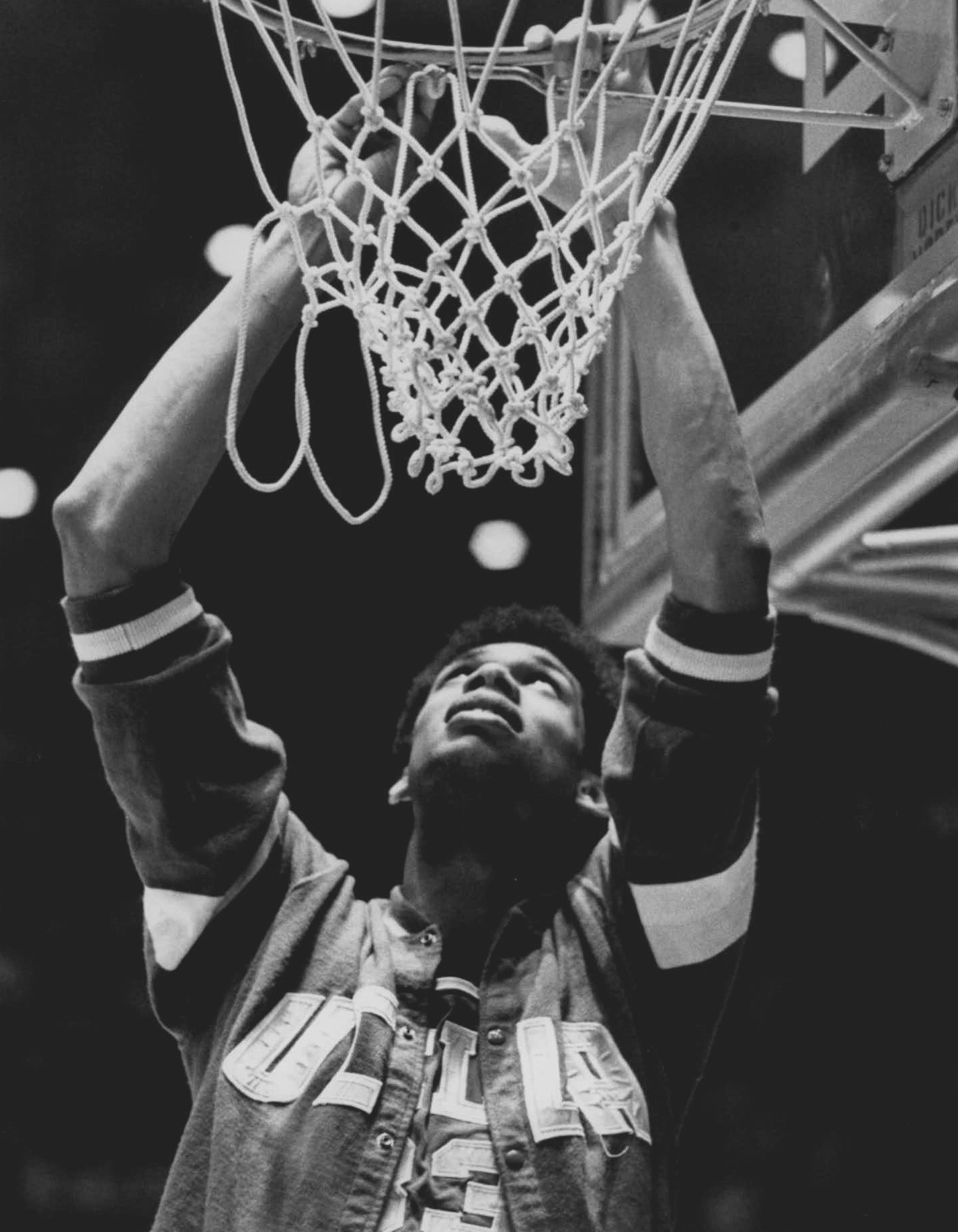
Lew Alcindor, (Note: Alcindor later changed his named to Kareem Abdul-Jabbar.) UCLA, 1967 through 1969

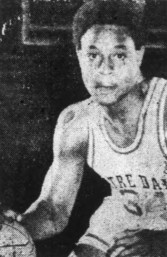
Austin Carr, Notre Dame, 1971

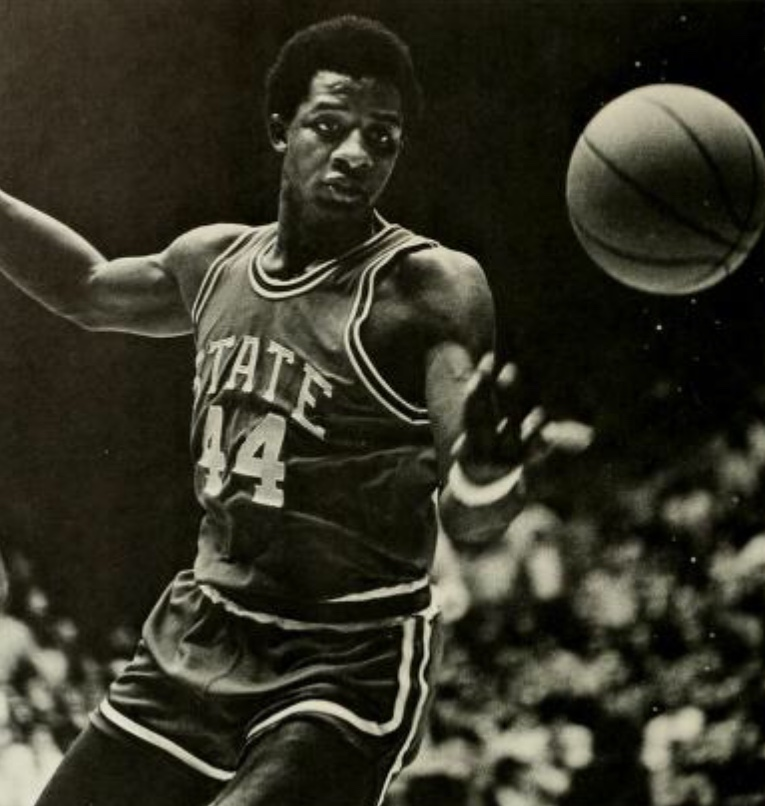
David Thompson, NC State, 1974 and 1975

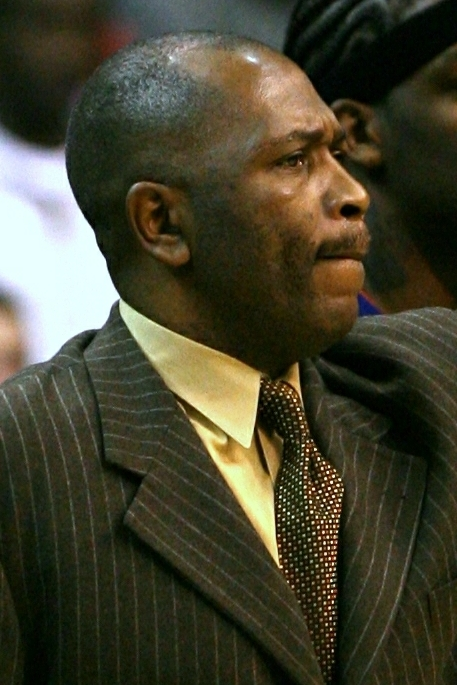
Mark Aguirre, DePaul, 1981

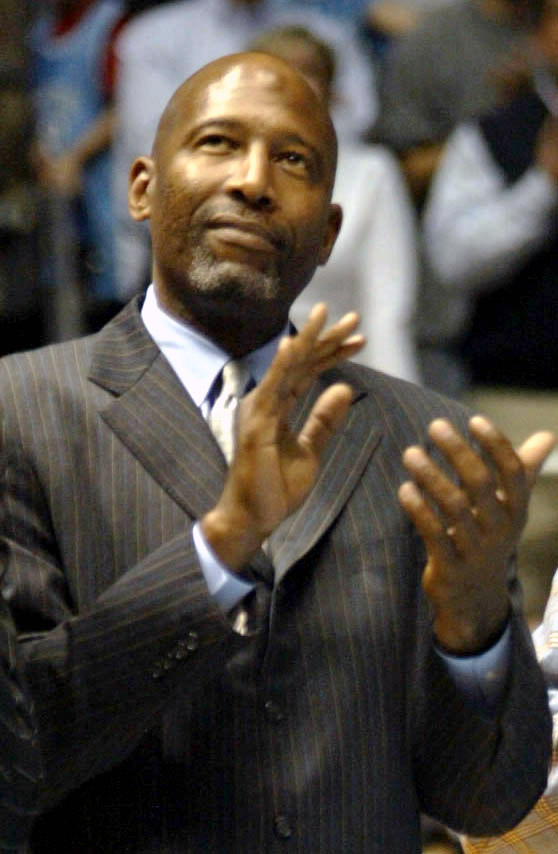
James Worthy, North Carolina, 1982

| Season | Player | School | Position | Class | Reference |
|---|---|---|---|---|---|
| 1904–05 | Christian Steinmetz | Wisconsin | F | Senior | |
| 1905–06 | George Grebenstein | Dartmouth | F | Junior | |
| 1906–07 | Gilmore Kinney | Yale | F | Senior | |
| 1907–08 | Charles Keinath | Pennsylvania | F | Junior | |
| 1908–09 | John Schommer | Chicago | C | Senior | |
| 1909–10 | Harlan Page | Chicago | G | Senior | |
| 1910–11 | Ted Kiendl | Columbia | F | Senior | |
| 1911–12 | Otto Stangel | Wisconsin | F | Senior | |
| 1912–13 | Eddie Calder | St. Lawrence | F | Senior | |
| 1913–14 | Gil Halstead | Cornell | C | Senior | |
| 1914–15 | Ernest Houghton | Union (NY) | G | Senior | |
| 1915–16 | George Levis | Wisconsin | F | Senior | |
| 1916–17 | Ray Woods | Illinois | G | Senior | |
| 1917–18 | Bill Chandler | Wisconsin | C | Senior | |
| 1918–19 | Erling Platou | Minnesota | G | Junior | |
| 1919–20 | Howard Cann | NYU | F | Senior | |
| 1920–21 | George Williams | Missouri | C | Senior | |
| 1921–22 | Chuck Carney | Illinois | C | Senior | |
| 1922–23 | Paul Endacott | Kansas | G | Senior | |
| 1923–24 | Charlie T. Black | Kansas | G | Senior | |
| 1924–25 | Earl Mueller | Colorado College | C | Senior | |
| 1925–26 | Jack Cobb | North Carolina | F | Senior | |
| 1926–27 | Vic Hanson | Syracuse | F | Senior | |
| 1927–28 | Victor Holt | Oklahoma | C | Senior | |
| 1928–29 | Cat Thompson | Montana State | F | Junior | |
| 1929–30 | Charley Hyatt | Pittsburgh | G | Senior | |
| 1930–31 | Bart Carlton | East Central | G | Senior | |
| 1931–32 | John Wooden | Purdue | G | Junior | |
| 1932–33 | Forest Sale | Kentucky | F / C | Senior | |
| 1933–34 | Wesley Bennett | Westminster (PA) | C | Senior | |
| 1934–35 | Leroy Edwards | Kentucky | C | Sophomore | |
| 1935–36 | John Moir | Notre Dame | F | Sophomore | |
| 1936–37 | Hank Luisetti | Stanford | F | Sophomore | |
| 1937–38 | Hank Luisetti (2) | Stanford | F | Junior | |
| 1938–39 | Chet Jaworski | Rhode Island | F | Senior | |
| 1939–40 | George Glamack | North Carolina | C | Junior | |
| 1940–41 | George Glamack (2) | North Carolina | C | Senior | |
| 1941–42 | Stan Modzelewski | Rhode Island | G / F | Senior | |
| 1942–43 | George Senesky | Saint Joseph's | G | Senior | |
| 1943–44 | George Mikan | DePaul | C | Junior | |
| 1944–45 | George Mikan (2) | DePaul | C | Senior | |
| 1945–46 | Bob Kurland | Oklahoma State | C | Senior | |
| 1946–47 | Gerald Tucker | Oklahoma | C | Senior | |
| 1947–48 | Ed Macauley | Saint Louis | C | Junior | |
| 1948–49 | Tony Lavelli | Yale | F | Senior | |
| 1949–50 | Paul Arizin | Villanova | F | Senior | |
| 1950–51 | Dick Groat | Duke | G | Junior | |
| 1951–52 | Clyde Lovellette | Kansas | F / C | Senior | |
| 1952–53 | Bob Houbregs | Washington | C | Senior | |
| 1953–54 | Tom Gola | La Salle | G / F | Senior | |
| 1954–55 | Bill Russell | San Francisco | C | Junior | |
| 1955–56 | Bill Russell (2) | San Francisco | C | Senior | |
| 1956–57 | Lennie Rosenbluth | North Carolina | F | Senior | |
| 1957–58 | Elgin Baylor | Seattle | F / C | Junior | |
| 1958–59 | Oscar Robertson | Cincinnati | G | Junior | |
| 1959–60 | Oscar Robertson (2) | Cincinnati | G | Senior | |
| 1960–61 | Jerry Lucas | Ohio State | F / C | Junior | |
| 1961–62 | Paul Hogue | Cincinnati | C | Senior | |
| 1962–63 | Art Heyman | Duke | G | Senior | |
| 1963–64 | Walt Hazzard | UCLA | G | Senior | |
| 1964–65^{†} | Bill Bradley | Princeton | G / F | Senior | |
| 1964–65^{†} | Gail Goodrich | UCLA | G | Senior | |
| 1965–66 | Cazzie Russell | Michigan | G / F | Senior | |
| 1966–67 | Lew Alcindor | UCLA | C | Sophomore | |
| 1967–68 | Lew Alcindor (2) | UCLA | C | Junior | |
| 1968–69 | Lew Alcindor (3) | UCLA | C | Senior | |
| 1969–70^{†} | Pete Maravich | LSU | G | Senior | |
| 1969–70^{†} | Sidney Wicks | UCLA | F / C | Junior | |
| 1970–71^{†} | Austin Carr | Notre Dame | G | Senior | |
| 1970–71^{†} | Sidney Wicks (2) | UCLA | F / C | Senior | |
| 1971–72 | Bill Walton | UCLA | C | Sophomore | |
| 1972–73 | Bill Walton (2) | UCLA | C | Junior | |
| 1973–74^{†} | Bill Walton (3) | UCLA | C | Senior | |
| 1973–74^{†} | David Thompson | NC State | G / F | Junior | |
| 1974–75 | David Thompson (2) | NC State | G / F | Senior | |
| 1975–76^{†} | Kent Benson | Indiana | C | Junior | |
| 1975–76^{†} | Scott May | Indiana | F | Senior | |
| 1976–77 | Marques Johnson | UCLA | G | Senior | |
| 1977–78 | Jack Givens | Kentucky | G / F | Senior | |
| 1978–79 | Larry Bird | Indiana State | F | Senior | |
| 1979–80 | Darrell Griffith | Louisville | G | Senior | |
| 1980–81 | Mark Aguirre | DePaul | F | Sophomore | |
| 1981–82^{†} | Ralph Sampson | Virginia | C | Junior | |
| 1981–82^{†} | James Worthy | North Carolina | F | Junior | |
| 1982–83 | Akeem Olajuwon (Note: Olajuwon later changed his first name's spelling from Akeem to Hakeem to use the original Arabic spelling.) | Houston | C | Sophomore | |
