= 1928–29 NCAA men's basketball season =

Men's collegiate basketball season

- The Veteran Athletes of Philadelphia deemed the Butler Bulldogs the season's national champions.
- Helms National Champions: Montana State (retroactive selection in 1943)
- Player of the Year (Helms): John "Cat" Thompson, Montana State (retroactive selection in 1944)

The 1928–29 NCAA men's basketball season began in December 1928, progressed through the regular season and conference tournaments, and concluded in March 1929.

== Rule changes ==
The charging foul by the player dribbling the ball was introduced.

== Season headlines ==
- The Big Six Conference and the Missouri Valley Conference began play. Both had formed when the Missouri Valley Intercollegiate Athletic Association (MVIAA) split into the two new conferences in May 1928, with the Big Six Conference officially retaining the MVIAA's name and the Missouri Valley Conference retaining its staff. Both claimed the MVIAA's founding date (1907) and its history from 1907 to 1928 as their own, and both claimed to be a continuation of the original conference.
- The practice of naming an annual Consensus All-American Team began.
- The Veteran Athletes of Philadelphia deemed Butler the mythical national champion of the 1928–29 season and awarded the Bulldogs the Veteran Athletes of Philadelphia Trophy.
- In February 1943, the Helms Athletic Foundation retroactively selected Montana State as its national champion for the 1928–29 season.
- In 1995, the Premo-Porretta Power Poll retroactively selected Montana State as its top-ranked team for the 1928–29 season.

== Conference membership changes ==
School	Former conference	New conference
Drake Bulldogs	Missouri Valley Intercollegiate Athletic Association	Missouri Valley Conference
Duke Blue Devils	Independent	Southern Conference
Grinnell Pioneers	Missouri Valley Intercollegiate Athletic Association	Missouri Valley Conference
Iowa State Cyclones	Missouri Valley Intercollegiate Athletic Association	Big Six Conference
Kansas Jayhawks	Missouri Valley Intercollegiate Athletic Association	Big Six Conference
Kansas State Wildcats	Missouri Valley Intercollegiate Athletic Association	Big Six Conference
Missouri Tigers	Missouri Valley Intercollegiate Athletic Association	Big Six Conference
Nebraska Cornhuskers	Missouri Valley Intercollegiate Athletic Association	Big Six Conference
Oklahoma Sooners	Missouri Valley Intercollegiate Athletic Association	Big Six Conference
Oklahoma A&M Aggies	Missouri Valley Intercollegiate Athletic Association	Missouri Valley Conference
Washington University in St. Louis Bears	Missouri Valley Intercollegiate Athletic Association	Missouri Valley Conference

== Regular season ==
=== Conferences ===
==== Conference winners and tournaments ====
Conference	Regular season winner	Conference player of the year	Conference tournament	Tournament venue (City)	Tournament winner
Big Six Conference	Oklahoma	None selected	No Tournament		
Big Ten Conference	Michigan & Wisconsin	None selected	No Tournament		
Eastern Intercollegiate Basketball League	Penn	None selected	No Tournament		
Missouri Valley Conference	Washington University	None selected	No Tournament		
Pacific Coast Conference	Washington (North); California (South)		No Tournament; California defeated Washington in best-of-three conference championship playoff series		
Rocky Mountain Athletic Conference	Colorado (Eastern); Montana State (Western)		No Tournament		
Southern Conference	Washington and Lee	None selected	1929 Southern Conference men's basketball tournament	Municipal Auditorium (Atlanta, Georgia)	NC State
Southwest Conference	Arkansas	None selected	No Tournament		

==== Conference standings ====
1928–29 Big Six Conference men's basketball standings
	Conf.				Overall
Team	W		L	PCT	W		L	PCT
Oklahoma	10	–	0	1.000	13	–	2	.867
Missouri	7	–	3	.700	11	–	7	.611
Nebraska	5	–	5	.500	11	–	5	.688
Iowa State	4	–	6	.400	8	–	7	.533
Kansas State	2	–	8	.200	6	–	10	.375
Kansas	2	–	8	.200	3	–	15	.167

1928–29 Big Ten Conference men's basketball standings
	Conf.				Overall
Team	W		L	PCT	W		L	PCT
Wisconsin	10	–	2	.833	15	–	2	.882
Michigan	10	–	2	.833	13	–	3	.813
Purdue	9	–	3	.750	13	–	4	.765
Northwestern	7	–	5	.583	12	–	5	.706
Illinois	6	–	6	.500	10	–	7	.588
Ohio State	6	–	6	.500	9	–	8	.529
Iowa	5	–	7	.417	9	–	8	.529
Indiana	4	–	8	.333	7	–	10	.412
Chicago	2	–	10	.167	5	–	11	.313
Minnesota	1	–	11	.083	4	–	13	.235

1928–29 Eastern Intercollegiate Basketball League standings
	Conf.				Overall
Team	W		L	PCT	W		L	PCT
Penn	8	–	2	.800	20	–	6	.769
Dartmouth	7	–	3	.700	13	–	6	.684
Columbia	5	–	5	.500	9	–	9	.500
Cornell	5	–	5	.500	9	–	11	.450
Yale	4	–	6	.400	11	–	9	.550
Princeton	1	–	9	.100	9	–	15	.375

1928–29 Missouri Valley Conference men's basketball standings
	Conf.				Overall
Team	W		L	PCT	W		L	PCT
Washington University	7	–	0	1.000	11	–	7	.611
Creighton	4	–	1	.800	13	–	4	.765
Drake	3	–	4	.429	6	–	13	.316
Oklahoma A&M	0	–	4	.000	1	–	14	.067
Grinnell	0	–	5	.000	6	–	11	.353

1928–29 Pacific Coast Conference men's basketball standings
	Conf.				Overall
Team	W		L	PCT	W		L	PCT
North
Washington	10	–	0	1.000	18	–	2	.900
Idaho	6	–	4	.600	11	–	10	.524
Washington State	5	–	5	.500	9	–	14	.391
Oregon State	4	–	6	.400	12	–	8	.600
Oregon	3	–	7	.300	10	–	8	.556
Montana	2	–	8	.200	9	–	11	.450
South
California †	9	–	0	1.000	17	–	3	.850
Stanford	6	–	3	.667	13	–	6	.684
USC	2	–	7	.222	16	–	6	.727
UCLA	1	–	8	.111	7	–	9	.438
† Conference playoff series winner

1928–29 Rocky Mountain Conference men's basketball standings
	Conf.				Overall
Team	W		L	PCT	W		L	PCT
Eastern
Colorado	10	–	2	.833	10	–	2	.833
Wyoming	11	–	3	.786	15	–	4	.789
Northern Colorado	8	–	6	.571	8	–	6	.571
Denver	7	–	7	.500	12	–	8	.600
Colorado Agricultural	6	–	6	.500	6	–	6	.500
Colorado College	6	–	6	.500	8	–	9	.471
Western State	1	–	9	.100	1	–	9	.100
Colorado School of Mines	1	–	11	.083	1	–	11	.083
Western
Montana State	11	–	1	.917	36	–	2	.947
BYU	6	–	6	.500	20	–	10	.667
Utah State	4	–	8	.333	8	–	10	.444
Utah	3	–	9	.250	5	–	12	.294

1928–29 Southern Conference men's basketball standings
	Conf.				Overall
Team	W		L	PCT	W		L	PCT
Washington and Lee	7	–	1	.875	16	–	2	.889
North Carolina	12	–	2	.857	17	–	8	.680
Georgia Tech	10	–	2	.833	15	–	6	.714
Georgia	13	–	4	.765	18	–	6	.750
Tulane	9	–	4	.692	9	–	5	.643
Kentucky	7	–	4	.636	12	–	5	.706
Tennessee	7	–	4	.636	11	–	5	.688
Alabama	10	–	6	.625	16	–	10	.615
Clemson	6	–	4	.600	15	–	12	.556
Duke	5	–	4	.556	12	–	8	.600
NC State †	6	–	5	.545	15	–	6	.714
Mississippi	7	–	8	.467	9	–	9	.500
Virginia Tech	5	–	7	.417	5	–	13	.278
Mississippi A&M	5	–	8	.385	8	–	15	.348
Virginia	3	–	6	.333	9	–	10	.474
LSU	5	–	9	.357	8	–	13	.381
South Carolina	4	–	10	.286	8	–	13	.381
Vanderbilt	2	–	5	.286	4	–	12	.250
Florida	4	–	11	.267	7	–	13	.350
Auburn	3	–	9	.250	6	–	15	.286
Maryland	2	–	6	.250	7	–	9	.438
VMI	1	–	7	.125	6	–	7	.462
Sewanee	0	–	7	.000	3	–	8	.273
† Southern Conference Tournament winner

1928–29 Southwest Conference men's basketball standings
	Conf.				Overall
Team	W		L	PCT	W		L	PCT
Arkansas	11	–	1	.917	19	–	1	.950
Texas	10	–	2	.833	18	–	2	.900
SMU	6	–	6	.500	7	–	9	.438
TCU	5	–	7	.417	10	–	7	.588
Texas A&M	4	–	6	.400	12	–	6	.667
Baylor	2	–	8	.200	7	–	9	.438
Rice	2	–	10	.167	2	–	10	.167

=== Independents ===
A total of 91 college teams played as major independents. Loyola of Illinois (16–0) was undefeated, and St. John's (23–2) finished with the most wins.

1928–29 NCAA men's basketball independents standings
	Conf.				Overall
Team	W		L	PCT	W		L	PCT
Loyola (Ill.)		–		–	16	–	0	1.000
Rhode Island State		–		–	15	–	1	.938
St. John's (N.Y.)		–		–	23	–	2	.920
East Central		–		–	21	–	2	.913
St. Ignatius		–		–	21	–	2	.913
Fordham		–		–	18	–	2	.900
Butler		–		–	17	–	2	.895
Westminster (Pa.)		–		–	15	–	2	.882
West Texas State		–		–	21	–	3	.875
Rider		–		–	19	–	3	.864
Ohio Wesleyan		–		–	18	–	3	.857
Mount Union		–		–	17	–	3	.850
Providence		–		–	17	–	3	.850
Northern Arizona State		–		–	15	–	3	.833
Arizona		–		–	19	–	4	.826
Springfield (Mass.)		–		–	14	–	3	.824
Temple		–		–	17	–	4	.810
Carleton		–		–	12	–	3	.800
Colgate		–		–	16	–	4	.800
Indiana State		–		–	15	–	4	.789
Saint Louis		–		–	14	–	4	.778
Santa Clara		–		–	10	–	3	.769
Cincinnati		–		–	13	–	4	.765
Pittsburgh		–		–	16	–	5	.762
Notre Dame		–		–	15	–	5	.750
The Citadel		–		–	12	–	4	.750
Seton Hall		–		–	11	–	4	.733
Syracuse		–		–	11	–	4	.733
West Virginia		–		–	16	–	6	.727
Wichita Municipal		–		–	16	–	6	.727
New York University		–		–	13	–	5	.722
St. Bonaventure		–		–	17	–	7	.708
Army		–		–	12	–	5	.706
Georgetown		–		–	12	–	5	.706
Washburn		–		–	12	–	5	.706
Wooster		–		–	12	–	5	.706
Muhlenberg		–		–	9	–	4	.692
Loyola (Md.)		–		–	11	–	5	.688
Michigan State		–		–	11	–	5	.688
Furman		–		–	12	–	6	.667
Marshall		–		–	14	–	7	.667
Richmond		–		–	10	–	5	.667
Rutgers		–		–	10	–	5	.667
Connecticut		–		–	11	–	6	.647
CCNY		–		–	9	–	5	.643f
Kent State Normal		–		–	11	–	7	.611
New Mexico		–		–	14	–	9	.609
Duquesne		–		–	12	–	8	.600
Louisville		–		–	12	–	8	.600
Holy Cross		–		–	10	–	7	.588
Canisius		–		–	7	–	5	.583
Western State Teachers		–		–	11	–	8	.579
Niagara		–		–	12	–	9	.571
Pittsburg State		–		–	13	–	10	.565
Bucknell		–		–	10	–	8	.556
Davidson		–		–	10	–	8	.556
DePaul		–		–	5	–	4	.556
DePauw		–		–	9	–	8	.529
Saint Francis (N.Y.)		–		–	9	–	8	.529
Texas Tech		–		–	9	–	8	.529
Xavier		–		–	9	–	8	.529
Penn State		–		–	10	–	9	.526
Valparaiso		–		–	11	–	10	.524
Bradley		–		–	8	–	8	.500
Lehigh		–		–	7	–	7	.500
Marquette		–		–	8	–	8	.500
Navy		–		–	8	–	8	.500
Ohio		–		–	10	–	10	.500
Dayton		–		–	9	–	10	.474
LIU		–		–	10	–	12	.455
William & Mary		–		–	9	–	11	.450
St. Joseph's		–		–	8	–	10	.444
Western Kentucky State		–		–	8	–	10	.444
Harvard		–		–	6	–	8	.429
Villanova		–		–	6	–	8	.429
New Mexico A&M		–		–	6	–	9	.400
Buffalo		–		–	7	–	11	.389
Miami (Ohio)		–		–	7	–	11	.389
Wake Forest		–		–	5	–	8	.385
Toledo		–		–	6	–	10	.375
Bowling Green State		–		–	6	–	11	.353
Boston University		–		–	4	–	8	.333
Lafayette		–		–	6	–	12	.333
Saint Mary's (Calif.)		–		–	5	–	10	.333
Tempe State		–		–	5	–	12	.294
Detroit		–		–	4	–	11	.267
Manhattan		–		–	4	–	11	.267
Brown		–		–	4	–	13	.235
Texas State M&M		–		–	4	–	14	.222
George Washington		–		–	2	–	8	.200
Tulsa		–		–	2	–	11	.154

== Awards ==
=== Consensus All-American team ===
Consensus Team
Player	Class	Team
Tom Churchill	Junior	Oklahoma
Vern Corbin	Senior	California
Charley Hyatt	Junior	Pittsburgh
Stretch Murphy	Junior	Purdue
Joe Schaaf	Senior	Pennsylvania
Cat Thompson	Junior	Montana State

=== Major player of the year awards ===
- Helms Player of the Year: John "Cat" Thompson, Montana State (retroactive selection in 1944)

== Coaching changes ==
A number of teams changed coaches during the season and after it ended.

Team	Former Coach	Interim Coach	New Coach	Reason
Arkansas	Francis Schmidt		Charles Bassett	
Tigers	George Bohler		Hal Lee	
Brown	Tuss McLaughry		Rufus Bond	
Dayton	George Fitzgerald		Bill Belanich	
DePaul	Eddie Anderson		Jim Kelly	
Detroit	Gus Dorais		Louis Conroy	
George Washington	Harry W. Crum		Joe Mitchell	
Georgetown	Elmer Ripley		Bill Dudack	Ripley left to coach at Yale. His assistant Dudack replaced him.
Iowa	Sam Barry		Rollie Williams	Barry left to coach at USC.
Lafayette	M. A. Miller		Herbert A. Lorenz	
Loyola (Md.)	Tony Comerford		John Menton	
Manhattan	James Houlihan		Neil Cohalan	
Marquette	Frank Murray		Cord Lipe	
New Mexico A&M	Ted Coffman		Jerry Hines	
Oklahoma State	John Maulbetsch		George E. Rody	
Saint Mary's (C.A.)	Louis Conlan		Vince McNally	
TCU	Marty Bell		Francis Schmidt	
Texas A&M	Charles Bassett		John B. Reid	Bassett left to coach at Arkansas.
USC	Leo Calland		Sam Barry	
Valparaiso	Earl Scott		Jake Christiansen	
Vanderbilt	Johnny Floyd		Garland Morrow	
Villanova	John Cashman		George Jacobs	
Virginia	Henry Lannigan		Roy Randall	
Virginia Tech	I. E. Randall		R. S. Warren	
