= 1928–29 Fordham Rams men's basketball team =

American college basketball season

1928–29 Fordham Rams men's basketball
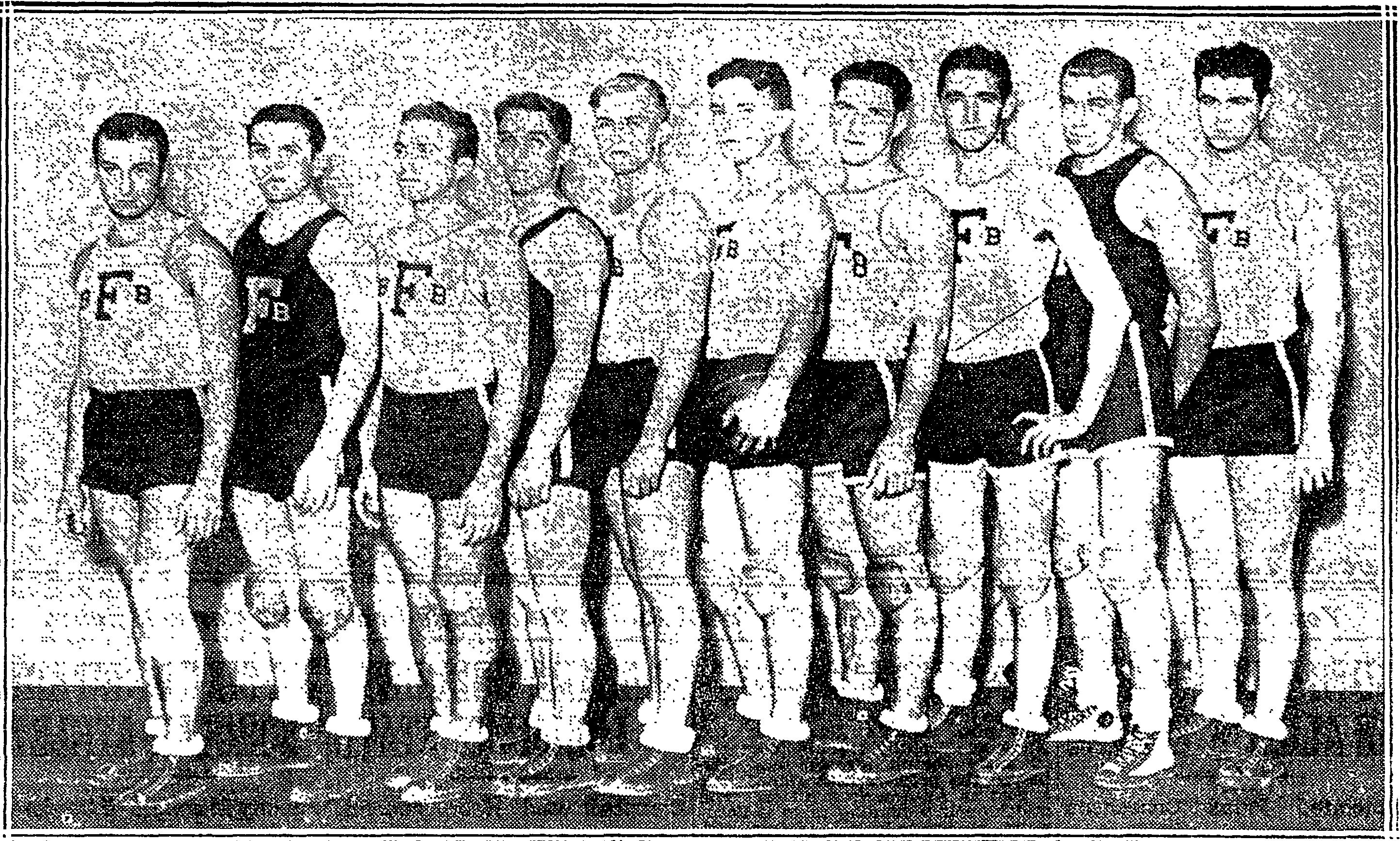
- Conference: Independent
- Record: 18–2
- Head coach: Ed Kelleher (6th season)
- Home arena: Rose Hill Gymnasium

1928–29 NCAA men's basketball independents standings
| | Conf. | | | | Overall |
| Team | W | | L | PCT | W | | L | PCT |
|---|---|---|---|---|---|---|---|---|
| Loyola (Ill.) | | – | | – | 16 | – | 0 | 1.000 |
| Rhode Island State | | – | | – | 15 | – | 1 | .938 |
| St. John's (N.Y.) | | – | | – | 23 | – | 2 | .920 |
| East Central | | – | | – | 21 | – | 2 | .913 |
| St. Ignatius | | – | | – | 21 | – | 2 | .913 |
| Fordham | | – | | – | 18 | – | 2 | .900 |
| Butler | | – | | – | 17 | – | 2 | .895 |
| Westminster (Pa.) | | – | | – | 15 | – | 2 | .882 |
| West Texas State | | – | | – | 21 | – | 3 | .875 |
| Rider | | – | | – | 19 | – | 3 | .864 |
| Ohio Wesleyan | | – | | – | 18 | – | 3 | .857 |
| Mount Union | | – | | – | 17 | – | 3 | .850 |
| Providence | | – | | – | 17 | – | 3 | .850 |
| Northern Arizona State | | – | | – | 15 | – | 3 | .833 |
| Arizona | | – | | – | 19 | – | 4 | .826 |
| Springfield (Mass.) | | – | | – | 14 | – | 3 | .824 |
| Temple | | – | | – | 17 | – | 4 | .810 |
| Carleton | | – | | – | 12 | – | 3 | .800 |
| Colgate | | – | | – | 16 | – | 4 | .800 |
| Indiana State | | – | | – | 15 | – | 4 | .789 |
| Saint Louis | | – | | – | 14 | – | 4 | .778 |
| Santa Clara | | – | | – | 10 | – | 3 | .769 |
| Cincinnati | | – | | – | 13 | – | 4 | .765 |
| Pittsburgh | | – | | – | 16 | – | 5 | .762 |
| Notre Dame | | – | | – | 15 | – | 5 | .750 |
| The Citadel | | – | | – | 12 | – | 4 | .750 |
| Seton Hall | | – | | – | 11 | – | 4 | .733 |
| Syracuse | | – | | – | 11 | – | 4 | .733 |
| West Virginia | | – | | – | 16 | – | 6 | .727 |
| Wichita Municipal | | – | | – | 16 | – | 6 | .727 |
| New York University | | – | | – | 13 | – | 5 | .722 |
| St. Bonaventure | | – | | – | 17 | – | 7 | .708 |
| Army | | – | | – | 12 | – | 5 | .706 |
| Georgetown | | – | | – | 12 | – | 5 | .706 |
| Washburn | | – | | – | 12 | – | 5 | .706 |
| Wooster | | – | | – | 12 | – | 5 | .706 |
| Muhlenberg | | – | | – | 9 | – | 4 | .692 |
| Loyola (Md.) | | – | | – | 11 | – | 5 | .688 |
| Michigan State | | – | | – | 11 | – | 5 | .688 |
| Furman | | – | | – | 12 | – | 6 | .667 |
| Marshall | | – | | – | 14 | – | 7 | .667 |
| Richmond | | – | | – | 10 | – | 5 | .667 |
| Rutgers | | – | | – | 10 | – | 5 | .667 |
| Connecticut | | – | | – | 11 | – | 6 | .647 |
| CCNY | | – | | – | 9 | – | 5 | .643f |
| Kent State Normal | | – | | – | 11 | – | 7 | .611 |
| New Mexico | | – | | – | 14 | – | 9 | .609 |
| Duquesne | | – | | – | 12 | – | 8 | .600 |
| Louisville | | – | | – | 12 | – | 8 | .600 |
| Holy Cross | | – | | – | 10 | – | 7 | .588 |
| Canisius | | – | | – | 7 | – | 5 | .583 |
| Western State Teachers | | – | | – | 11 | – | 8 | .579 |
| Niagara | | – | | – | 12 | – | 9 | .571 |
| Pittsburg State | | – | | – | 13 | – | 10 | .565 |
| Bucknell | | – | | – | 10 | – | 8 | .556 |
| Davidson | | – | | – | 10 | – | 8 | .556 |
| DePaul | | – | | – | 5 | – | 4 | .556 |
| DePauw | | – | | – | 9 | – | 8 | .529 |
| Saint Francis (N.Y.) | | – | | – | 9 | – | 8 | .529 |
| Texas Tech | | – | | – | 9 | – | 8 | .529 |
| Xavier | | – | | – | 9 | – | 8 | .529 |
| Penn State | | – | | – | 10 | – | 9 | .526 |
| Valparaiso | | – | | – | 11 | – | 10 | .524 |
| Bradley | | – | | – | 8 | – | 8 | .500 |
| Lehigh | | – | | – | 7 | – | 7 | .500 |
| Marquette | | – | | – | 8 | – | 8 | .500 |
| Navy | | – | | – | 8 | – | 8 | .500 |
| Ohio | | – | | – | 10 | – | 10 | .500 |
| Dayton | | – | | – | 9 | – | 10 | .474 |
| LIU | | – | | – | 10 | – | 12 | .455 |
| William & Mary | | – | | – | 9 | – | 11 | .450 |
| St. Joseph's | | – | | – | 8 | – | 10 | .444 |
| Western Kentucky State | | – | | – | 8 | – | 10 | .444 |
| Harvard | | – | | – | 6 | – | 8 | .429 |
| Villanova | | – | | – | 6 | – | 8 | .429 |
| New Mexico A&M | | – | | – | 6 | – | 9 | .400 |
| Buffalo | | – | | – | 7 | – | 11 | .389 |
| Miami (Ohio) | | – | | – | 7 | – | 11 | .389 |
| Wake Forest | | – | | – | 5 | – | 8 | .385 |
| Toledo | | – | | – | 6 | – | 10 | .375 |
| Bowling Green State | | – | | – | 6 | – | 11 | .353 |
| Boston University | | – | | – | 4 | – | 8 | .333 |
| Lafayette | | – | | – | 6 | – | 12 | .333 |
| Saint Mary's (Calif.) | | – | | – | 5 | – | 10 | .333 |
| Tempe State | | – | | – | 5 | – | 12 | .294 |
| Detroit | | – | | – | 4 | – | 11 | .267 |
| Manhattan | | – | | – | 4 | – | 11 | .267 |
| Brown | | – | | – | 4 | – | 13 | .235 |
| Texas State M&M | | – | | – | 4 | – | 14 | .222 |
| George Washington | | – | | – | 2 | – | 8 | .200 |
| Tulsa | | – | | – | 2 | – | 11 | .154 |

The 1928–29 Fordham Rams men's basketball team represented Fordham University during the 1928–29 NCAA men's basketball season. The team was coached by Ed Kelleher in his sixth year at the school. Fordham's home games were played at Rose Hill Gymnasium and were an Independent. The Captain was Frank Dougherty.

== Schedule ==
| Date time, TV | Rank^{#} | Opponent^{#} | Result | Record | Site city, state |
|---|---|---|---|---|---|
| December 8* | | at St. Francis Brooklyn | W 29–16 | 1–0 | Rose Hill Gymnasium; Bronx, NY |
| December 12* | | Fordham Maroon Alumni | W 30–20 | 2–0 | Rose Hill Gymnasium; Bronx, NY |
| December 15* | | Gettysburg | W 28–19 | 3–0 | Rose Hill Gymnasium; The Bronx, New York |
| December 20* | | Yale | W 46–23 | 4–0 | Rose Hill Gymnasium; The Bronx, New York |
| January 2* | | Princeton | W 41–15 | 5–0 | Rose Hill Gymnasium; Bronx, NY |
| January 4* | | Colgate | W 25–23 | 6–0 | Rose Hill Gymnasium; Bronx, NY |
| January 8* | | Bucknell | W 55–30 | 7–0 | Rose Hill Gymnasium; The Bronx, NY |
| January 11* | | Syracuse | W 37–15 | 8–0 | Rose Hill Gymnasium; Bronx, NY |
| January 16* | | at Saint Joseph's | W 27–25 ^{OT} | 9–0 | The Palestra; Philadelphia, Pennsylvania |
| January 19* | | Columbia | W 36–18 | 10–0 | Rose Hill Gymnasium; The Bronx, New York |
| February 2* | | Tufts | W 47–18 | 11–0 | Rose Hill Gymnasium; Bronx, NY |
| February 5* | | at Loyola Maryland | W 43–30 | 12–0 | Evergreen Gymnasium; Baltimore, Maryland |
| February 6* | | at Catholic | W 47–20 | 13–0 | Brookland Gymnasium; Washington, D. C. |
| February 9* | | at Baltimore | W 56–18 | 14–0 | Baltimore, Maryland |
| February 13* | | St. Thomas | W 50–17 | 15–0 | Rose Hill Gymnasium; The Bronx, New York |
| February 16* | | CCNY | W 50–19 | 16–0 | Rose Hill Gymnasium; Bronx, New York |
| February 20* | | St. John's | W 24–21 | 17–0 | Rose Hill Gymnasium; The Bronx, NY |
| February 23* | | vs. NYU | L 15–32 | 17–1 | 102nd Engineers Armory; New York, NY |
| February 27* | | at Manhattan | W 33–21 | 18–1 | Riverdale, NY |
*Non-conference game. ^{#}Rankings from AP Poll. (#) Tournament seedings in parentheses.
