= 1928–29 Missouri Tigers men's basketball team =

American college basketball season

1928–29 Missouri Tigers men's basketball
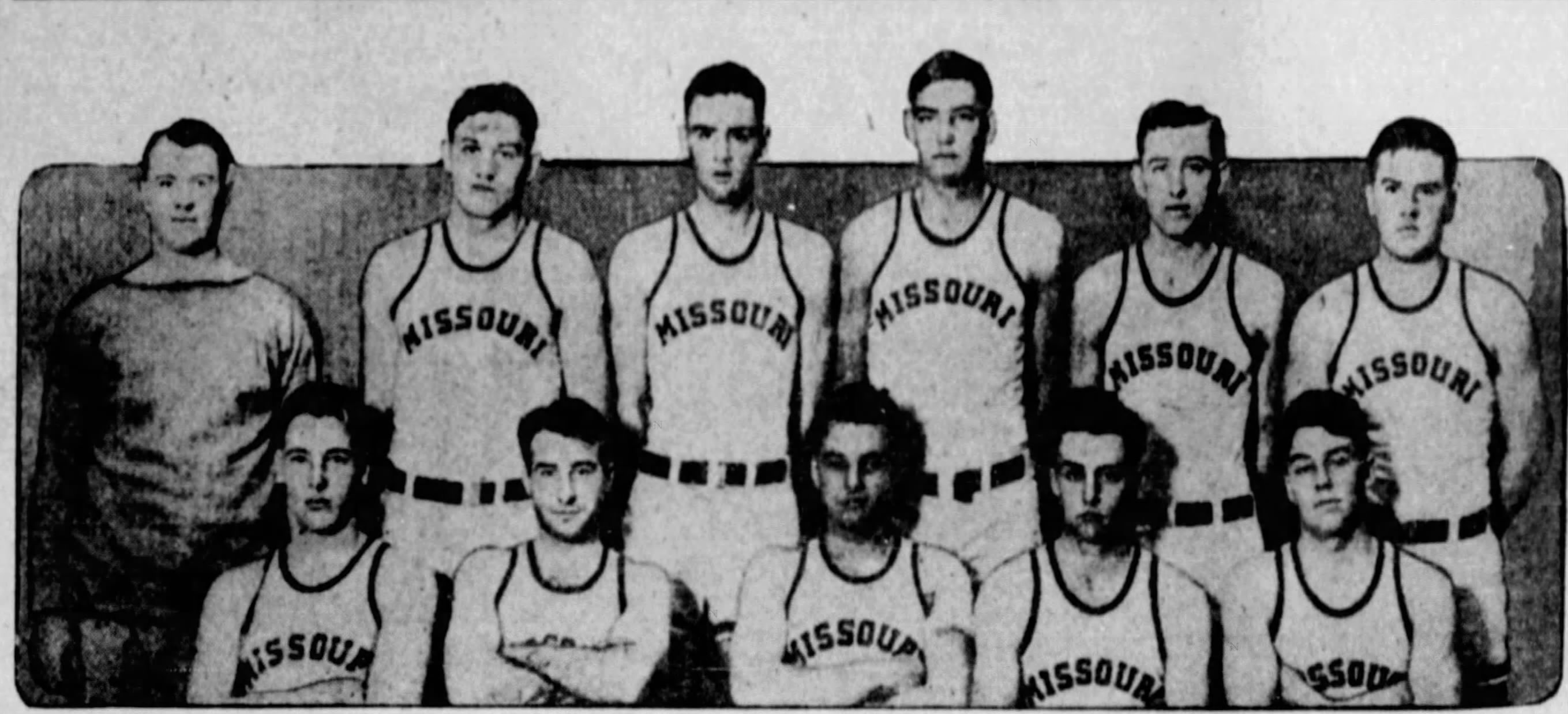
- Conference: Big Six Conference
- Record: 11–7 (7–3 Big Six)
- Head coach: George R. Edwards (3rd season)
- Home arena: Rothwell Gymnasium

1928–29 Big Six Conference men's basketball standings
	Conf.				Overall
Team	W		L	PCT	W		L	PCT
Oklahoma	10	–	0	1.000	13	–	2	.867
Missouri	7	–	3	.700	11	–	7	.611
Nebraska	5	–	5	.500	11	–	5	.688
Iowa State	4	–	6	.400	8	–	7	.533
Kansas State	2	–	8	.200	6	–	10	.375
Kansas	2	–	8	.200	3	–	15	.167

The 1928–29 Missouri Tigers men's basketball team represented University of Missouri during the 1928–29 NCAA men's basketball season. The Tigers were coached by George R. Edwards, who was in his third season with the Tigers. They played their home games at the Rothwell Gymnasium in Columbia, Missouri, the last apparent season in that venue before the Brewer Fieldhouse was opened to expand upon it.

They finished the season 11–7, 7–3 in Big Six play to finish in second place.

== Schedule and results ==
Date time, TV	Rank^{#}	Opponent^{#}	Result	Record	Site city, state
Regular season
December 22, 1928*		vs. Kansas; Border War	W 38–31	1–0	Convention Hall; Kansas City, MO
January 3, 1929*		at Butler	L 25–38	1–1	Butler Fieldhouse; Indianapolis, Indiana
January 4, 1929*		at Indiana	L 29–42	1–2	The Fieldhouse; Bloomington, Indiana
January 12, 1929		at Nebraska	W 30–25	2–2 (1–0)	Nebraska Coliseum; Lincoln, Nebraska
January 15, 1929		Kansas; Border War	W 34–30	3–2 (2–0)	Rothwell Gymnasium; Columbia, Missouri
January 20, 1929		Kansas State	W 51–36	4–2 (3–0)	Rothwell Gymnasium; Columbia, Missouri
January 26, 1929*		at Washington (MO)	W 30–28	5–2	Francis Gymnasium; St. Louis, MO
January 28, 1929*		at Drake	W 36–35	6–2	Drake Fieldhouse; Des Moines, Iowa
January 29, 1929		at Iowa State	W 29–19	7–2 (4–0)	State Gymnasium; Ames, Iowa
February 2, 1929		Oklahoma	L 34–40	7–3 (4–1)	Rothwell Gymnasium; Columbia, Missouri
February 6, 1929*		Washington (MO)	L 25–29	7–4	Rothwell Gymnasium; Columbia, Missouri
February 7, 1929*		at Creighton	W 33–29	8–4	University Gym; Omaha, Nebraska
February 8, 1929		at Kansas State	W 35–25	9–4 (5–1)	Nichols Hall; Manhattan, Kansas
February 11, 1929*		Drake	L 26–32	9–5	Rothwell Gymnasium; Columbia, Missouri
February 15, 1929		Iowa State	W 49–29	10–5 (6–1)	Rothwell Gymnasium; Columbia, Missouri
February 20, 1929		at Kansas; Border War	W 33–20	11–5 (7–1)	Hoch Auditorium; Lawrence, Kansas
February 25, 1929		Nebraska	L 33–39	11–6 (7–2)	Rothwell Gymnasium; Columbia, Missouri
March 2, 1929		at Oklahoma	L 35–36	11–7 (7–3)	OU Fieldhouse; Norman, Oklahoma
*Non-conference game. ^{#}Rankings from AP poll. (#) Tournament seedings in parentheses. All times are in Central Time.
