= 1928–29 Kansas Jayhawks men's basketball team =

American college basketball season

1928–29 Kansas Jayhawks men's basketball
- Conference: Big Six Conference
- Record: 3–15 (2–8 Big 6)
- Head coach: Phog Allen (12th season)
- Assistant coach: John Bunn (8th season)
- Captain: Forrest Cox
- Home arena: Hoch Auditorium

1928–29 Big Six Conference men's basketball standings
	Conf.				Overall
Team	W		L	PCT	W		L	PCT
Oklahoma	10	–	0	1.000	13	–	2	.867
Missouri	7	–	3	.700	11	–	7	.611
Nebraska	5	–	5	.500	11	–	5	.688
Iowa State	4	–	6	.400	8	–	7	.533
Kansas State	2	–	8	.200	6	–	10	.375
Kansas	2	–	8	.200	3	–	15	.167

The 1928–29 Kansas Jayhawks men's basketball team represented the University of Kansas during the 1928–29 college men's basketball season. It was the Jayhawks' 31st season. The Jayhawks were coached by Phog Allen, who was in the 10th season of his second tenure and 12th overall. They played their home games at Hoch Auditorium. The Jayhawks finished 2–8 in the Big Six Conference and 3–15 overall. The Jayhawks' .167 win percentage remains the worst win percentage in program history and is tied with the 1899–1900 team for fewest wins, however, that team only played 7 games.

== Roster ==
- Tom Bishop
- Forrest Cox
- Leo Dodd
- Robert Maney
- George McCormick
- Clarence McGuire
- Francis Plumley
- Floyd Ramsey
- Russell Thomson

== Schedule ==
Date time, TV	Rank^{#}	Opponent^{#}	Result	Record	Site city, state
December 18*		at Washburn	L 24–25	0-1	Topeka, KS
December 22		vs. Missouri; Border War	L 31–38	0-2	Convention Hall; Kansas City, MO
January 2*		vs. Notre Dame	L 21–32	0-3	Convention Hall; Kansas City, MO
December 29*		Notre Dame	L 17–29	0-4	Convention Hall; Kansas City, MO
January 3*		vs. California	L 21–33	0-5	Kaiser Convention Center; Oakland, CA
January 4*		vs. California	L 23–30	0-6	Kaiser Convention Center; Oakland, CA
January 5*		vs. California	W 24–23	1-6	Kaiser Convention Center; Oakland, CA
January 12		Oklahoma	L 25–27	1-7 (0-1)	Hoch Auditorium; Lawrence, KS
January 15		at Missouri; Border War	L 30–34	1-8 (0-2)	Rothwell Gymnasium; Columbia, MO
January 19		at Nebraska	L 29–30	1-9 (0-3)	Nebraska Coliseum; Lincoln, NE
January 21		Iowa State	L 24–27	1-10 (0-4)	Hoch Auditorium; Lawrence, KS
February 2		Kansas State; Sunflower Showdown	W 31–24	2-10 (1-4)	Hoch Auditorium; Lawrence, KS
February 7		Nebraska	L 31–37	2-11 (1-5)	Hoch Auditorium; Lawrence, KS
February 16		at Oklahoma	L 25–40	2-12 (1-6)	Field House; Norman, OK
February 20		Missouri; Border War	L 20–33	2-13 (1-7)	Hoch Auditorium; Lawrence, KS
February 28*		at Creighton	L 27–44	2-14	University Gymnasium; Omaha, Nebraska
February 28		at Iowa State	W 33–32	3-14 (2-7)	State Gymnasium; Ames, IA
March 5		at Kansas State; Sunflower Showdown	L 35–36	3-15 (2-8)	Nichols Hall; Manhattan, KS
*Non-conference game. ^{#}Rankings from AP Poll. (#) Tournament seedings in parentheses.
