= Beasley Coliseum =

Arena on the campus of Washington State University in Pullman

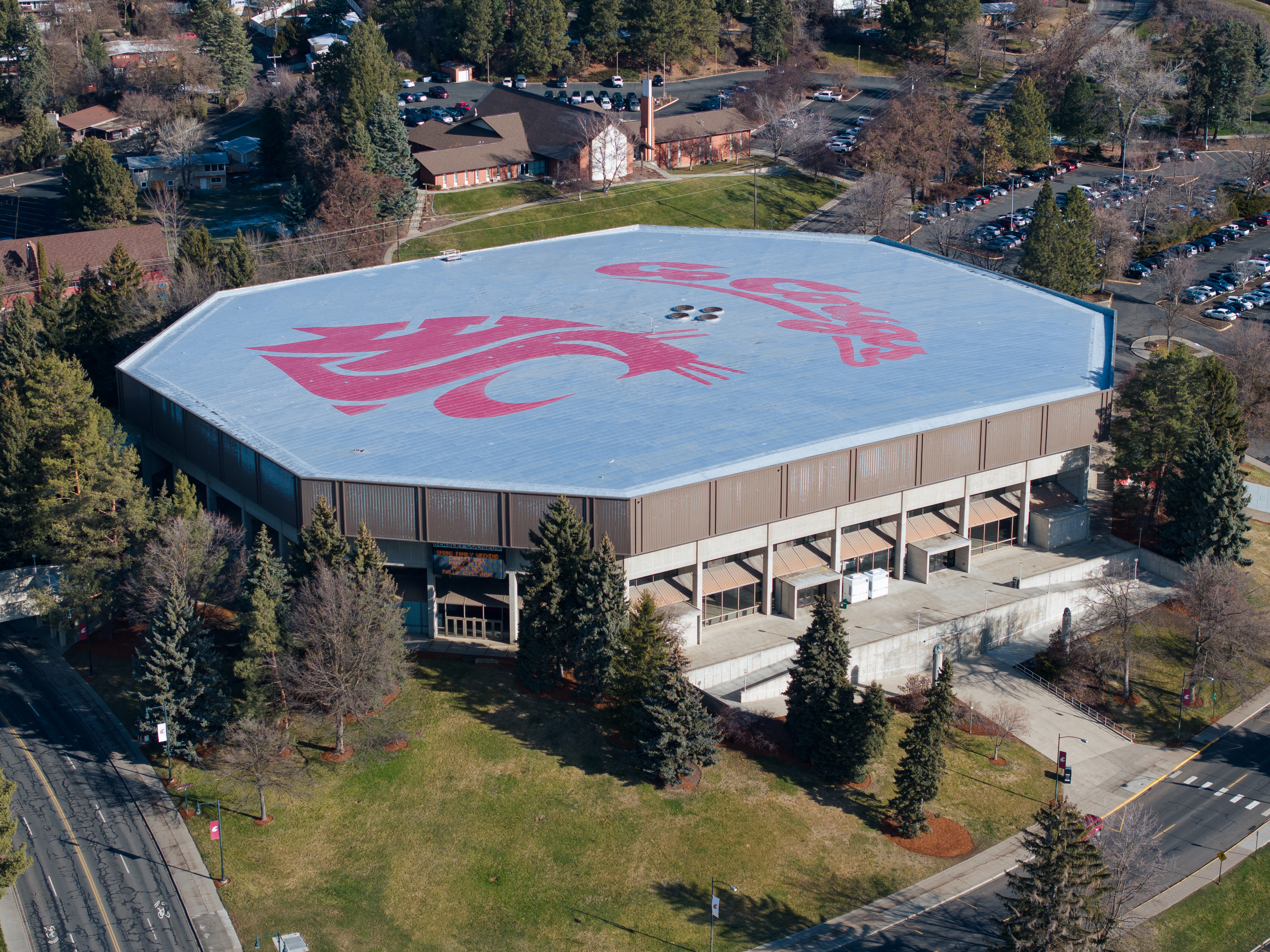
- Aerial view from southwest in 2024

- Location in the United States Location in Washington
- Interactive map of Beasley Coliseum
- Full name: Beasley Coliseum
- Former names: Washington State University; Performing Arts Coliseum (1973–1981)
- Address: 925 NE North Fairway Rd.
- Location: Washington State University; Pullman, Washington, U.S.
- Coordinates: 46°44′6″N 117°9′27″W
- Elevation: 2,550 feet (775 m) AMSL
- Owner: Washington State University
- Operator: Washington State University
- Capacity: 12,058

Construction
- Groundbreaking: February 8, 1971
- Opened: June 3, 1973
- Cost: $8.5 million ($61.6 million in 2025)
- Architect: John Graham & Company

Tenants
- Washington State Cougars - NCAA (1973–present)

Beasley Coliseum is a general-purpose indoor arena in the northwest United States, located on the campus of Washington State University in Pullman, Washington. The home venue for the Cougars men's and women's basketball teams of the Pac-12 Conference, it opened 53 years ago in 1973, and its current seating capacity is 12,058 for basketball.

The arena was renamed in 1981 for Wallis Beasley (1915–2008), a long-time sociology professor and executive vice president, shortly before his retirement from the university. He was WSU's faculty representative for athletics in the 1960s and also served as interim university president. For its first eight years, the venue was known as "Washington State University Performing Arts Coliseum."

The building used "space frame" construction, relatively novel at the time. The elevation of the court is approximately 2,550 feet (775 m) above sea level.

The project was approved by the WSU board of regents in early 1969.

== First events ==
The building's inaugural event in 1973 was the university's commencement exercises on June 3. Its first sporting event was an NBA exhibition game between Seattle and Portland on September 25, 1973. The first major concert was Three Dog Night on Friday, October 5; tickets were five dollars.

The first collegiate sporting event was a men's varsity basketball game against LSU on December 1, immediately preceded by a freshman game. The visiting Tigers were led by second-year head coach Dale Brown, previously an assistant at WSU (1971–72). Intercollegiate basketball was formerly played in Bohler Gymnasium, which opened in 1928 and is now home to Cougar volleyball.

== Friel Court ==
Located on the east side of campus, the building includes the home arena for Cougars men's and women's basketball. It is named Friel Court in honor of Jack Friel (1898–1995), the longtime head coach of the WSU men's basketball team, who led the Cougars to 495 victories in 30 seasons.

Friel stepped down as head coach in 1958 and five years later became the first commissioner of the Big Sky Conference, originally based in Pullman (from 1963 to 1971), because that's where he lived. The court was named for Friel in late April 1977, announced by President Glenn Terrell at a meeting of the board of regents; the dedication ceremony was at halftime on December 3.

The court surface was tartan (polyurethane) for its first decade; a traditional hardwood floor debuted in the fall of 1983.

=== NCAA tournament ===
The Coliseum has hosted the sub-regionals of the NCAA men's basketball tournament three times: 1975, 1982, and 1984.

The 1975 tournament expanded to 32 teams and the sub-regional had just two games: Big Sky champion Montana (20–6) and second-ranked UCLA (23–3) advanced on Saturday night before 10,500. Pac-8 champion UCLA trailed Big Ten runner-up Michigan by four at halftime and needed overtime to win by twelve. In the opener, WSU alumnus Jud Heathcote's Montana beat independent Utah State by six. Five days later in the Sweet Sixteen in Portland, UCLA defeated the Grizzlies by a mere three points; the Bruins continued on and won a tenth national title in 12 seasons, and hall of fame head coach John Wooden retired.

By 1982, the tournament had 48 teams and its Pullman sub-regional had four games with six teams, headlined by the Northwest's top two teams, fourth-ranked Oregon State (27–4) and #8 Idaho (26–2). Both were seeded with first-round byes and advanced: Oregon State dispatched Pepperdine and Palouse neighbor Idaho outlasted Iowa in overtime to advance to the Sweet Sixteen, with 12,340 in attendance on Sunday afternoon. The next week in Provo, Utah, OSU eliminated Idaho, then was defeated by Georgetown, the eventual runner-up.

The 1984 tournament had 53 teams and six played in Pullman on the new hardwood. WSU's archrival Washington beat Nevada then upset third-seeded Duke, while eventual champion Georgetown outlasted SMU 37–36 before over 10,500 spectators on Sunday afternoon.

With the opening of Spokane Arena in 1995, Spokane has hosted NCAA tournament games in 2003, 2007, 2010, 2014, 2016, and 2024.

== Entertainment ==
In addition to basketball, the building's full name reflects its use for concerts, big-name speakers, dinners, and commencement. Beasley may be reconfigured for seating capacities of 12,000 in the round to 9,000 in an end-stage configuration for concerts, to 2,500 in a theater configuration using an extensive system of fly-in curtains, an adjustable cloth scrim ceiling, and a portable proscenium stored under the floor.

The original opera house/theater configuration featured one of the first synthesized acoustical environments using surround speaker systems. An onsite reverberation chamber tuned with fiberglass panels for the specific acoustical configuration was combined with the first commercial use of a digital delay line, the Lexicon DD1, then fed to the side and overhead speakers. When properly set up, it was capable of producing a very convincing acoustical rendition of a theater, an opera house, or, by changing the delay settings and retuning the reverb chamber, even a cathedral. Unfortunately, a sewer drain line had been installed from the southeast corner restroom facilities through the reverb chamber, and if a toilet flushed when the system was in operation, the resulting sound effect was extraordinary. After discovering that, locking the restroom was a management priority whenever the theater was prepared for surround sound use. More recently, full digital reverberation replaced the chamber.

The Coliseum's Hall of Fame—famous entertainers who have performed there—include comedians such as Bob Hope, Bill Cosby, Jay Leno, and Whoopi Goldberg, and musical stars or shows such as The Beach Boys, The 5th Dimension, Tony Orlando and Dawn, Stevie Wonder, Bob Dylan, Elton John, Def Leppard, Metallica, Bon Jovi, Van Halen, Dana Carvey, Drew Carey, Montgomery Gentry, Bill Engvall, Howie Mandel, Grease, and Cats. The Harlem Globetrotters have performed there five times.

For many years, the Coliseum has been the venue for the Great Performances series, organized by the Festival Dance and Performing Arts Association of neighboring Moscow, Idaho.

Overflow crowds attended lectures by Noam Chomsky on April 22, 2005, and by Jane Goodall on March 8, 2007.

On March 6, 2010, the arena hosted a WWE SmackDown house show.

== Temporary housing ==
Due to a shortage of student housing in September 1975, the two-year-old Coliseum temporarily housed 80 men for several weeks and was dubbed the "Cougar Hilton."

== See also ==
- List of NCAA Division I basketball arenas
