= Brick Breeden Fieldhouse =

Montana, United States indoor arena

- Worthington Arena; The Brick
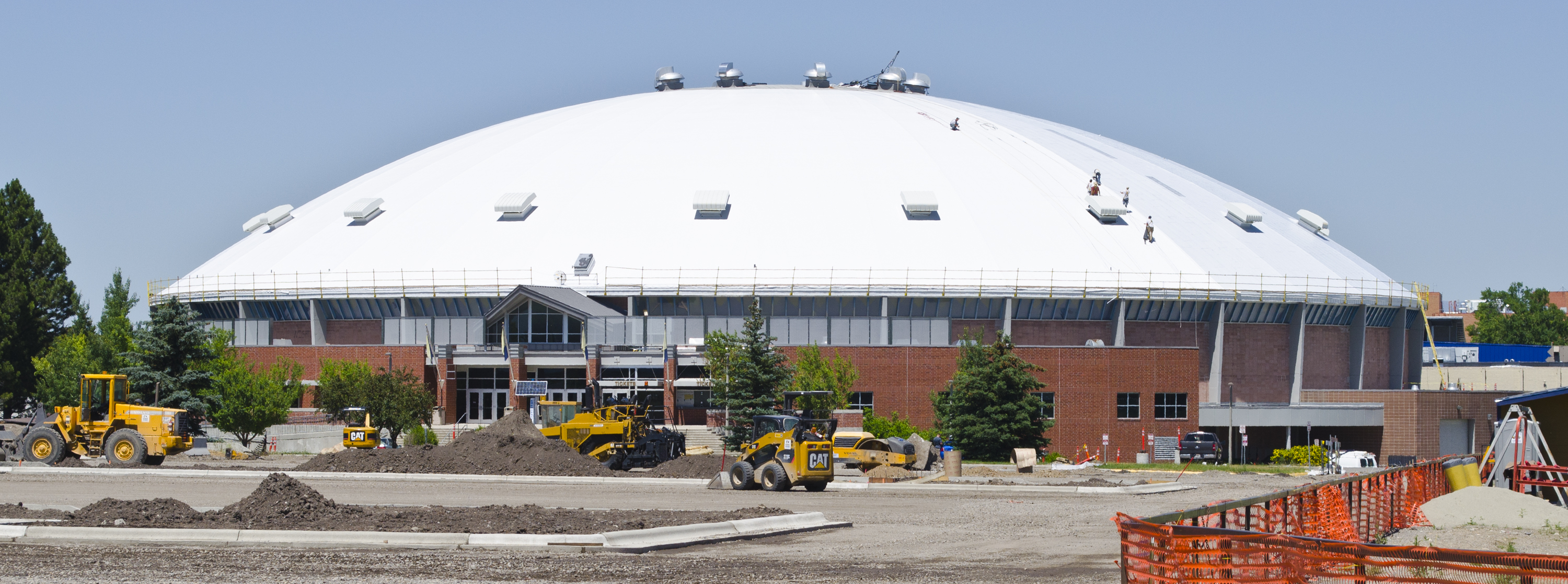
- View from south (c. 2013)

- Location in the United States Location in Utah
- Interactive map of Brick Breeden Fieldhouse
- Former names: MSU Fieldhouse (1965–81); MSC Fieldhouse (1957–65)
- Address: One Bobcat Circle
- Location: Montana State University; Bozeman, Montana, U.S.
- Coordinates: 45.6633°N 111.0506°W
- Elevation: 4,920 feet (1,500 m) AMSL
- Owner: Montana State University
- Operator: Montana State Event Services
- Capacity: 8,455; 3,472 (Theatre at The Brick)

Construction
- Opened: January 11, 1957; 69 years ago
- Renovated: 1998, 2013
- Cost: $1.6 million ($19.2 million in 2025)
- Architects: Wilson & Berg

Tenant
- MSU Bobcats (NCAA) (1957–present)

Website
- Venue Website

The Brick Breeden Fieldhouse is a multi-purpose indoor arena in the western United States, located on the campus of Montana State University in Bozeman, Montana. It is the home of the Montana State Bobcats of the Big Sky Conference; the primary venue for men's and women's basketball and indoor track and field.

The arena regularly has numerous tournaments, concerts, plays, speaking engagements, and trade shows throughout the year; it annually hosts the high school all-class state volleyball tournament and the MSU Spring Rodeo. The Big Sky men's basketball tournament finals were played here in 1988, 1996, and 2002, and the women's in 1993.

On the south side of campus, its elevation at street level is 4,920 feet (1,500 m) above sea level.

== History ==
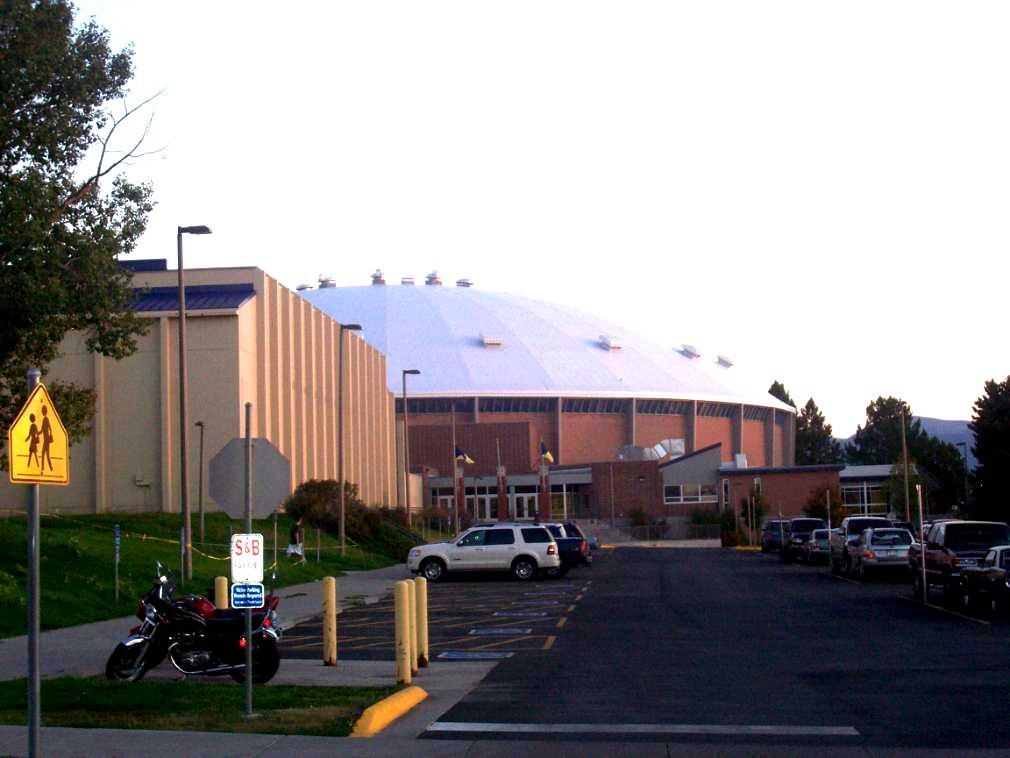
North end from Grant Street, 2010

The building was the inspiration of architect Oswald "Ozzie" Berg Jr. and Montana State College (MSC) president Roland Renne, who dreamed of an indoor facility large enough for college football games. Though there was not enough funding to build it big enough to house a full-sized football field, the fieldhouse was the largest clear-span wooden structure in the world, since surpassed by other buildings such as the Walkup Skydome in Flagstaff, Arizona, and the Tacoma Dome in Tacoma, Washington.

Opened 69 years ago in 1957 as the MSC Fieldhouse, it was named for longtime basketball coach John "Brick" Breeden in 1981. The main arena was named Worthington Arena in 1985 in honor of Max Worthington, a starting guard on Montana State's 1928-29 national championship team. Both were members of the 1929 "Golden Bobcats" basketball team, named national champions by the Helms Foundation. Breeden later coached the Bobcats basketball team and served as athletic director, and Worthington, also a former coach, served as a school administrator and longtime booster.

From 1959 to 1960, the fieldhouse hosted indoor Little League games.

The arena drew national attention in 1960 as it hosted a National Boxing Association middleweight title bout between Gene Fullmer and Joey Giardello on April 20. It was the first title fight held in Montana in 37 years, since the infamous Jack Dempsey vs. Tommy Gibbons heavyweight bout, which bankrupted the small town of Shelby in 1923. With a national television broadcast guarantee of $100,000 and a sellout attendance of 12,122, the fight, declared a draw, was a tremendous financial success.

== Rodeo ==
The College National Finals Rodeo was annually held in the fieldhouse from 1970 to 1996, with the exception of 1979, when it was in Lake Charles, Louisiana. MSU's annual Spring Rodeo takes place in the arena in April.

== Renovations ==
The main floor was originally dirt, which was not uncommon for a collegiate multi-purpose field house in that era; Hec Edmundson Pavilion in Seattle long had an unfinished earthen floor. With its usage as a rodeo venue, the dirt surface in Bozeman was practical at the time.

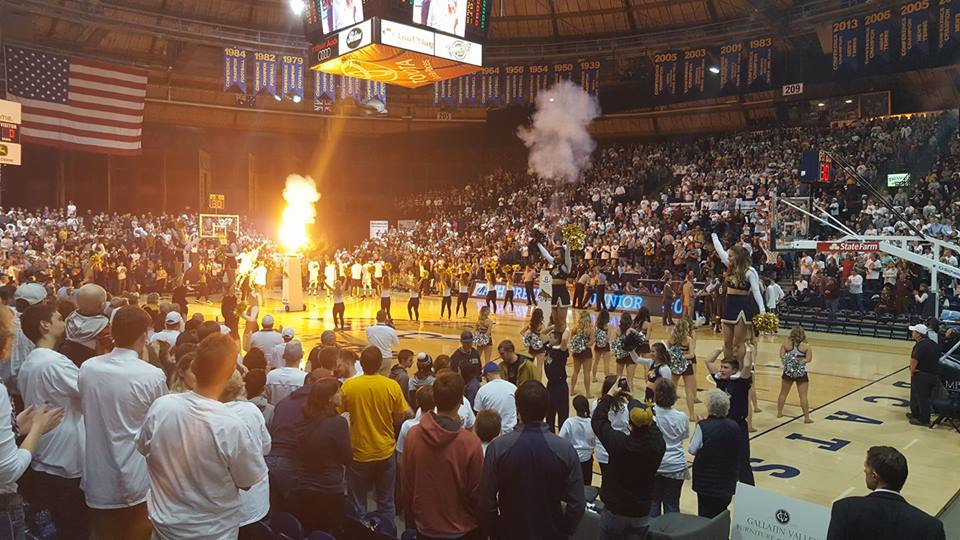
Montana vs. MSU basketball player introductions, 2017

A portable raised basketball court was assembled in the center of the space and wooden boardwalks led spectators from the entrance to the concession stand and bleachers. Basketball players were obliged to wipe their feet after emerging from the dressing rooms and before stepping up to the court.

In 1980, the entire arena floor was covered with a hard tartan (polyurethane) surface and new folding bleachers were installed on the main level. Other than the new floor, the facility changed very little in its first forty years.

In 1998, a $13.2 million renovation was completed that transformed the building into a modern multi-purpose arena. A new main entrance was constructed on the south side that brings spectators into the arena at the mezzanine level. Elevators and other features were added to make the building handicapped accessible. Old bleacher and chairback seats were replaced. The building's mechanical systems were upgraded, and additional fire, life-safety, and seismic features were added to bring the building up to modern codes. The renovation also featured new administrative and coaches offices, locker room improvements, better concession stands, new reception areas, and a new Hall of Fame. The arena can be converted quickly from athletic events to concerts, to theater performances.

== See also ==
- List of NCAA Division I basketball arenas
