= 1928–29 Georgia Bulldogs basketball team =

American college basketball team season

1928–29 Georgia Bulldogs basketball
- Conference: Southern Conference
- Record: 18–6 (13–4 SoCon)
- Head coach: Herman Stegeman (10th season)
- Captain: Jimmy Harris
- Home arena: Woodruff Hall

1928–29 Southern Conference men's basketball standings
	Conf.				Overall
Team	W		L	PCT	W		L	PCT
Washington and Lee	7	–	1	.875	16	–	2	.889
North Carolina	12	–	2	.857	17	–	8	.680
Georgia Tech	10	–	2	.833	15	–	6	.714
Georgia	13	–	4	.765	18	–	6	.750
Tulane	9	–	4	.692	9	–	5	.643
Kentucky	7	–	4	.636	12	–	5	.706
Tennessee	7	–	4	.636	11	–	5	.688
Alabama	10	–	6	.625	16	–	10	.615
Clemson	6	–	4	.600	15	–	12	.556
Duke	5	–	4	.556	12	–	8	.600
NC State †	6	–	5	.545	15	–	6	.714
Mississippi	7	–	8	.467	9	–	9	.500
Virginia Tech	5	–	7	.417	5	–	13	.278
Mississippi A&M	5	–	8	.385	8	–	15	.348
Virginia	3	–	6	.333	9	–	10	.474
LSU	5	–	9	.357	8	–	13	.381
South Carolina	4	–	10	.286	8	–	13	.381
Vanderbilt	2	–	5	.286	4	–	12	.250
Florida	4	–	11	.267	7	–	13	.350
Auburn	3	–	9	.250	6	–	15	.286
Maryland	2	–	6	.250	7	–	9	.438
VMI	1	–	7	.125	6	–	7	.462
Sewanee	0	–	7	.000	3	–	8	.273
† Southern Conference Tournament winner

The 1928–29 Georgia Bulldogs basketball team represented the University of Georgia as a member of the Southern Conference (SoCon) during the 1928–29 NCAA men's basketball season. Led by tenth-year head coach Herman Stegeman, the Bulldogs compiled an overall record of 18–6 with a mark of 13–4 in conference play, placing fourth in the SoCon. The team captain was Jimmy Harris.

== Roster ==
1928–29 Georgia Bulldogs men's basketball team
Players
Coaches

Pos.	#	Name	Height	Weight	Year	Previous school	Hometown
		Henry Palmer	—	—
		Jimmy Harris	—	—
		Sanford	—	—
		Buck Anderson	—	—
		Joe Martin	—	—
		Dunn	—	—

Head coach

Herman Stegeman

Assistant coach(es)

Legend

- (C) Team captain
- (S) Suspended
- (I) Ineligible
- (W) Walk-on
- Injured
- Current redshirt

== Schedule ==
Date time, TV	Opponent	Result	Record	Site city, state
12/18/1928	J.P.C. Reds	W 42-32	1–0	
12/23/1928	Southern Bell	W 47-20	2–0	
1/1/1929	South Carolina	W 54-28	3–0	
1/2/1929	South Carolina	W 46-21	4–0	
1/4/1929	Florida	W 48-26	5–0	
1/14/1929	at Wash. & Lee	W 44-25	6–0	
1/15/1929	at V.M.I.	W 34-22	7–0	
1/16/1929	at Virginia	W 40-32	8–0	
1/24/1929	North Carolina	L 29-31	8–1	
1/26/1929	at Ga. Tech	L 37-38	8–2	
1/30/1929	at N.C. State	W 45-37	9–2	
2/2/1929	Auburn	W 39-31	10–2	
2/5/1929	Duke	W 24-22	11–2	
2/7/1929	Sewanee	W 41-19	12–2	
2/9/1929	at A.A.C.	L 29-43	12–3	
2/12/1929	Tennessee	W 45-21	13–3	
2/14/1929	at Clemson	L 23-30	13–4	
2/16/1929	A.A.C.	L 33-41	13–5	
2/19/1929	Clemson	W 41-25	14–5	
2/23/1929	Ga. Tech	W 27-25	15–5	
3/1/1929	Auburn	W 42-24	16–5	
3/2/1929	Kentucky	W 26-24	17–5	
3/3/1929	Duke	L 37-43	17–6	
	Florida	W 48-32	18–6	
*Non-conference game. (#) Tournament seedings in parentheses.
