= List of Arkansas Razorbacks men's basketball head coaches =

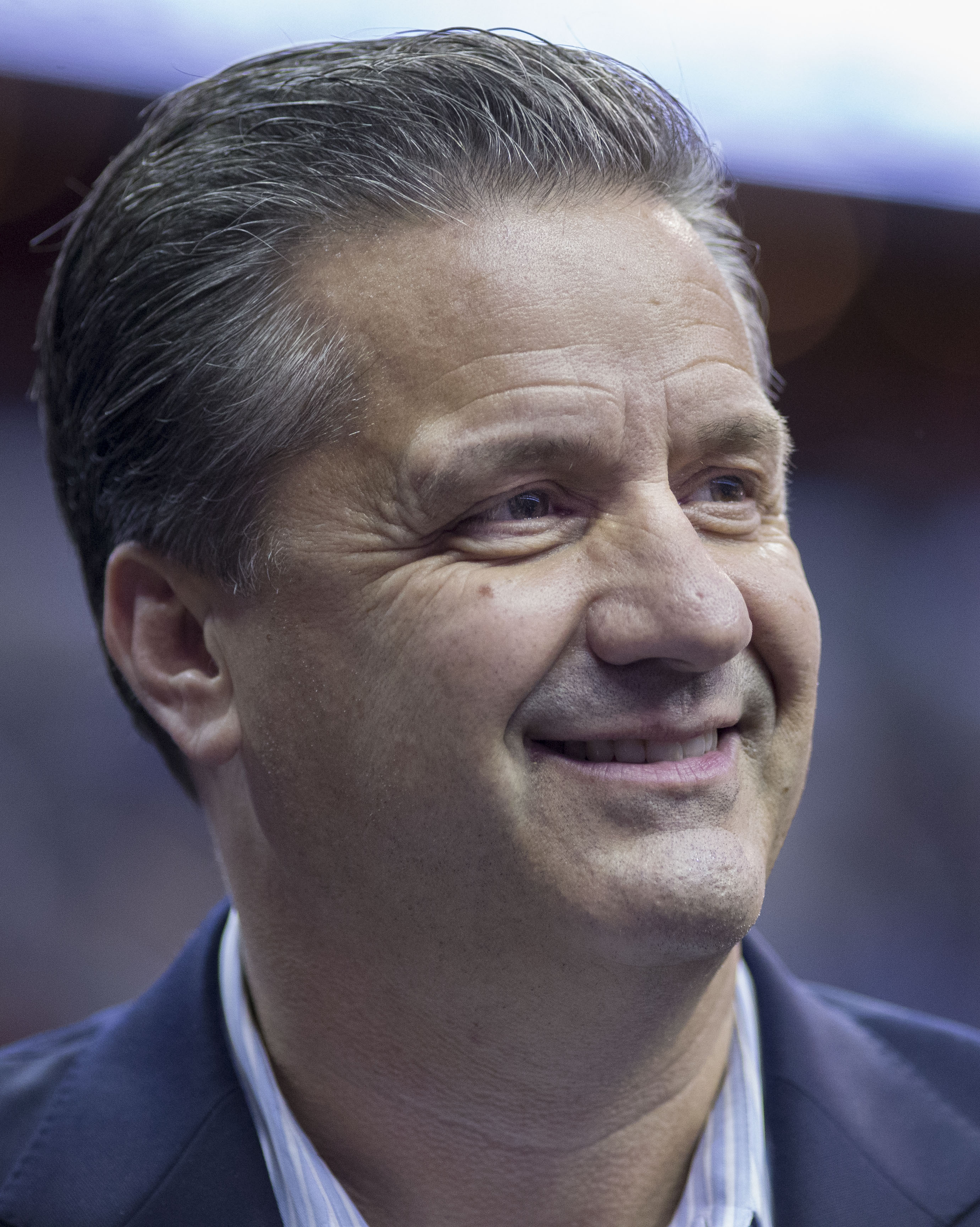
John Calipari, current head coach of the Arkansas Razorbacks men's basketball team.

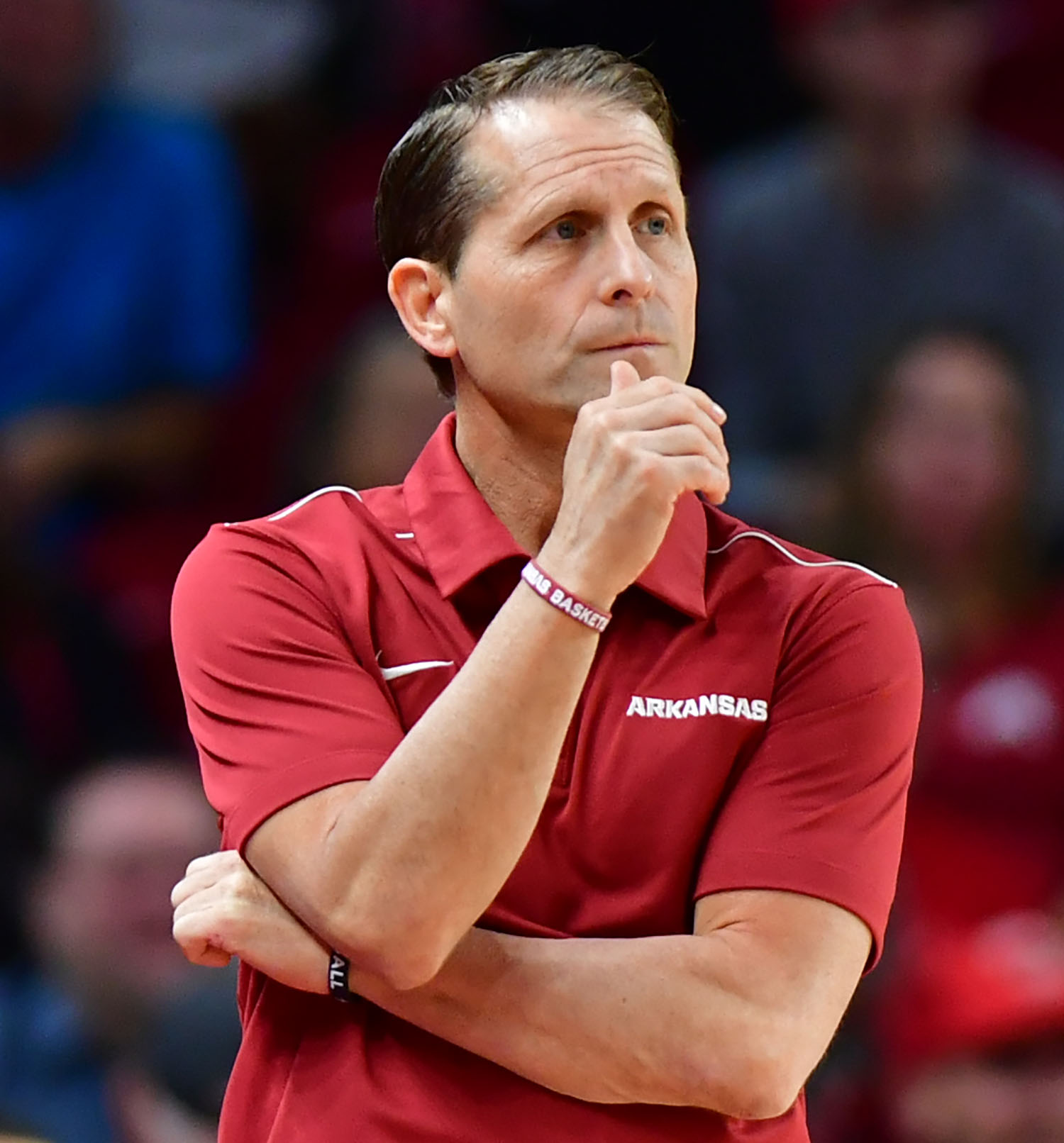
Eric Musselman, head coach of the Arkansas Razorbacks from 2019-2023.

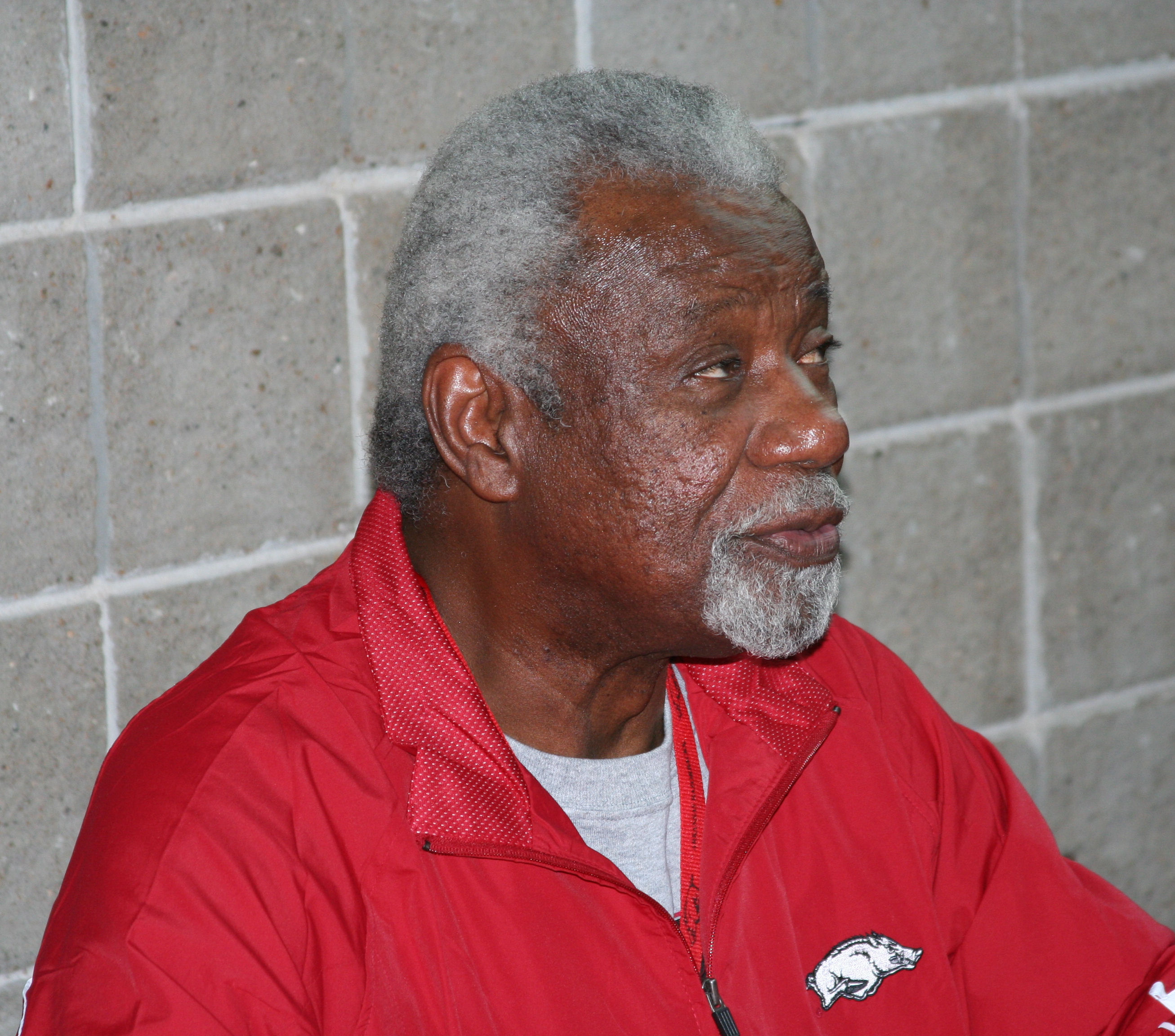
Nolan Richardson, the 3rd winningest head coach in Razorbacks men's basketball history.

The following is a list of Arkansas Razorbacks men's basketball head coaches. The Razorbacks have had 14 coaches in their 100-season history.

The Razorbacks current head coach is John Calipari. He was hired in April 2024 to replace Eric Musselman, who left for the vacant USC head coaching position after the end of the 2023-24 season.

No.	Tenure	Coach	Years	Record	Pct.
1	1923–1929	Francis Schmidt	6	113–22	.837
2	1929–1933	Charles Bassett	4	62–29	.681
3	1933–1942; 1952–1966	Glen Rose	23	352–201	.637
4	1942–1949	Eugene Lambert	7	113–60	.653
5	1949–1952	Presley Askew	3	35–37	.486
6	1966–1970	Duddy Waller	4	31–64	.326
7	1970–1974	Lanny Van Eman	4	39–65	.375
8	1974–1985	Eddie Sutton	11	260–75	.776
9	1985–2002 (Note: Nolan Richardson's contract was bought out by Arkansas on March 1, 2002. Mike Anderson served as interim coach for the remainder of the season.)	Nolan Richardson	17	389–169	.697
10	2002–2007	Stan Heath	5	82–71	.536
11	2007–2011	John Pelphrey	4	69–59	.539
12	2002* (Note: Mike Anderson's first stint as head coach was as interim coach in 2002, taking over for Nolan Richardson. Nine years later, Anderson left his job as head coach at Missouri to become the full-time head coach.); 2011–2019	Mike Anderson	9	170–103	.623
13	2019–2023	Eric Musselman	4	95–42	.693
14	2024–present	John Calipari	2	50–23	.685
Totals		14 coaches	101 seasons	1831–1019	.642
Records updated through end of 2025–26 season Source

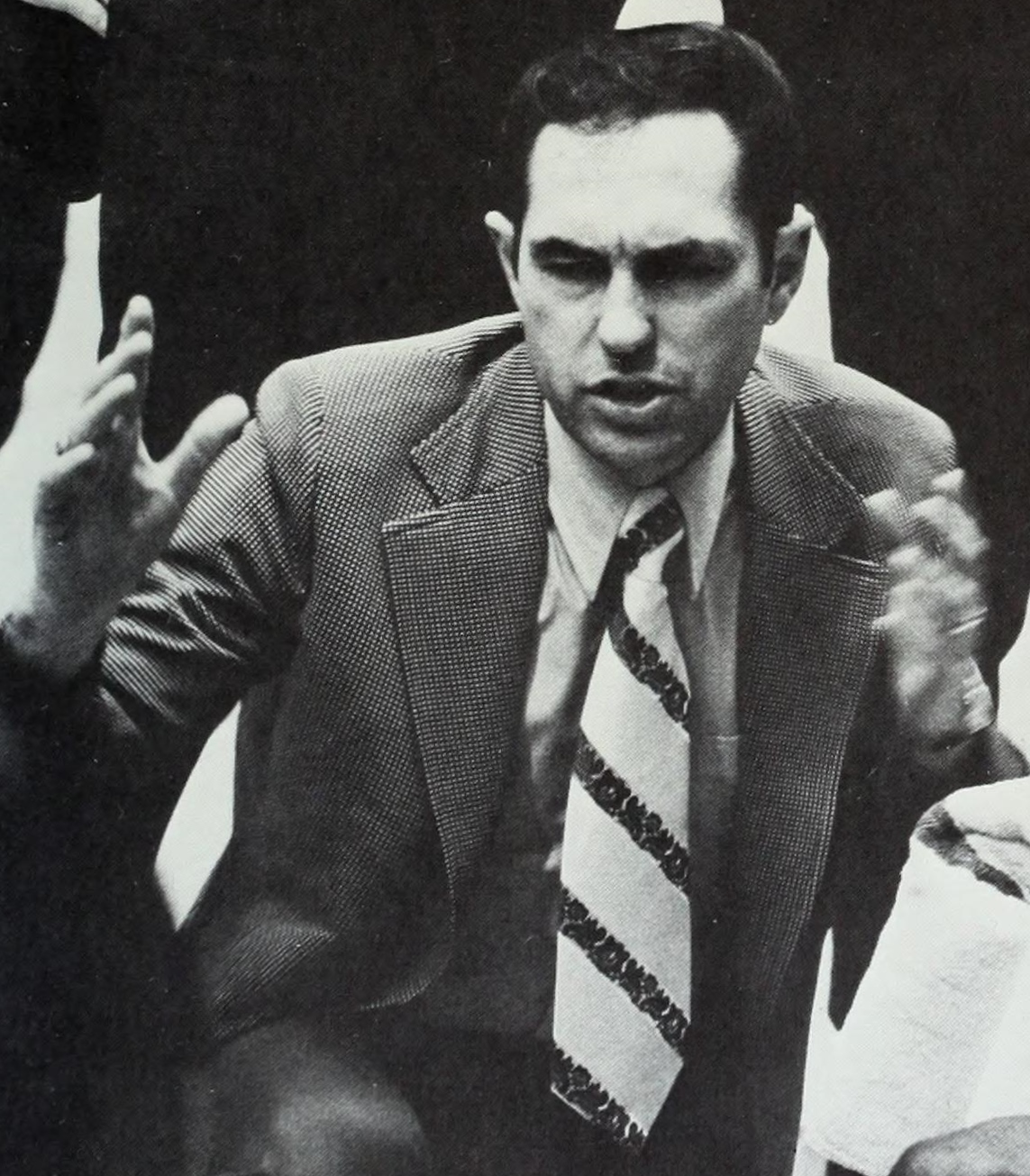
Eddie Sutton, head coach of the Arkansas Razorbacks men's basketball team from 1974-1985.
