= Charles Bassett (disambiguation) =

Charles Bassett (1931–1966) was an American test pilot and astronaut.

Charles Bassett may also refer to:

- Charles Bassett (basketball) (fl. 1927–1933), American basketball coach
- Charley Bassett (1863–1942), American baseball player
- Charlie Bassett (1847–1896), American lawman and saloon keeper of the American Old West
