= 1928–29 Iowa State Cyclones men's basketball team =

American college basketball season

1928–29 Iowa State Cyclones men's basketball
- Conference: Big Six Conference
- Record: 8–7 (4–6 Big Six)
- Head coach: Louis Menze (1st season)
- Home arena: State Gymnasium

1928–29 Big Six Conference men's basketball standings
	Conf.				Overall
Team	W		L	PCT	W		L	PCT
Oklahoma	10	–	0	1.000	13	–	2	.867
Missouri	7	–	3	.700	11	–	7	.611
Nebraska	5	–	5	.500	11	–	5	.688
Iowa State	4	–	6	.400	8	–	7	.533
Kansas State	2	–	8	.200	6	–	10	.375
Kansas	2	–	8	.200	3	–	15	.167

The 1928–29 Iowa State Cyclones men's basketball team (also known informally as Ames) represented Iowa State University during the 1928–29 NCAA men's basketball season. The Cyclones were coached by Louis Menze, who was in his first season with the Cyclones. They played their home games at the State Gymnasium in Ames, Iowa.

They finished the season 8–7, 4–6 in Big Six play to finish in fourth place.

== Roster ==
1928–29 Iowa State Cyclones men's basketball team
Players
Coaches

Pos.	#	Name	Height	Weight	Year	Hometown
G		Ayres	—	—		Sioux Falls, South Dakota
		M. Becker	—	—		Des Moines, Iowa
		Forrest Bennett	—	—		Marshall, Oklahoma
		F.C. Boxwell	—	—		Martelle, Iowa
		Melchior Brunner	—	—		Jefferson, Iowa
		Robert Burton	—	—		Waterloo, Iowa
		C.H. Carlson	—	—		Des Moines, Iowa
		Walter Clauson	—	—		Greeley, Iowa
		Phillip Gissal	—	—		Alton, Illinois
		R.O. Haas	—	—		Sioux City, Iowa
		Truman Hawkins	—	—		Dallas Center, Iowa
		Howard Hyland	—	—		Valley Junction, Iowa
		E.J. Jensen	—	—		West Branch, Iowa
		Glen Johnson	—	—		Grinnell, Iowa
F		Lester Lande (C)	—	—	So	Northwood, Iowa
		Elmer Larson	—	—		Sergeant Bluff, Iowa
F		Fred Ludwig	—	—	Sr	Lawton, Iowa
		Keith Marsh	—	—		Humboldt, Iowa
		A.E. Nelson	—	—		Des Moines, Iowa
		H Pohlman	—	—		Melvin, Iowa
		Joseph Ragland	—	—		Webb City, Missouri
		John Roudebush	—	—		Ames, Iowa
		Carl Rudi	—	—		Glidden, Iowa
		Ivan Sack	—	—		Sac City, Iowa
		R.A. Scott	—	—		Marcus, Iowa
		Lee Stillman	—	—		Gowrie, Iowa
G		Taylor	—	—		Montezuma, Iowa
		R.T. Tecklenburg	—	—		Keystone, Iowa
		Rudolph Tegland	—	—		Story City, Iowa
		Richard Wilcox	—	—		Stanhope, Iowa
		Donald Wilson	—	—		Hopkinton, Iowa
C		Glenn Woods	—	—	Jr	Irwin, Iowa
G		Burnett Zimmerman	—	—		Watertown, South Dakota

Head coach

- Louis Menze

Assistant coach(es)

Legend

- (C) Team captain
- (S) Suspended
- (I) Ineligible
- (W) Walk-on
- Injured
- Current redshirt

== Schedule and results ==
Date time, TV	Rank^{#}	Opponent^{#}	Result	Record	Site city, state
Regular season
December 20, 1928*		Simpson	W 42–18	1–0	State Gymnasium; Ames, Iowa
January 1, 1929*		at Simpson	W 35–16	2–0	Indianola, Iowa
January 5, 1929*		at State Teacher's (Northern Iowa); Iowa Big Four	W 29–27	3–0	Cedar Falls, Iowa
January 11, 1929		Kansas State	W 41–30	4–0 (1–0)	State Gymnasium; Ames, Iowa
January 19, 1929		at Oklahoma	L 22–35	4–1 (1–1)	OU Field House; Norman, Oklahoma
January 21, 1929		at Kansas	W 27–24	5–1 (2–1)	Hoch Auditorium; Lawrence, Kansas
January 25, 1929; 8:00 pm		at Drake; Iowa Big Four	W 35–34	6–1	Drake Fieldhouse; Des Moines, Iowa
January 29, 1929		Missouri	L 19–29	6–2 (2–2)	State Gymnasium; Ames, Iowa
February 2, 1929		Nebraska	L 39–45	6–3 (2–3)	Nebraska Coliseum; Lincoln, Nebraska
February 4, 1929*		at Creighton	L 26–32	6–4	University Gym; Omaha, Nebraska
February 9, 1929		Oklahoma	L 34–48	6–5 (2–4)	State Gymnasium; Ames, Iowa
February 15, 1929		at Missouri	L 29–49	6–6 (2–5)	Rothwell Gymnasium; Columbia, Missouri
February 16, 1929		at Kansas State	W 44–35	7–6 (3–5)	Nichols Hall; Manhattan, Kansas
February 22, 1929		Nebraska	W 37–33	8–6 (4–5)	State Gymnasium; Ames, Iowa
February 27, 1929		Kansas	L 32–33	8–7 (4–6)	State Gymnasium; Ames, Iowa
*Non-conference game. ^{#}Rankings from AP poll. (#) Tournament seedings in parentheses. All times are in Central Time.
