= 1928–29 UCLA Bruins men's basketball team =

American college basketball season

1928–29 UCLA Bruins men's basketball
- Conference: Pacific Coast Conference
- South
- Record: 7–9 (1–8 PCC)
- Head coach: Caddy Works (8th season)
- Assistant coaches: Silas Gibbs; Wilbur Johns

1928–29 Pacific Coast Conference men's basketball standings
	Conf.				Overall
Team	W		L	PCT	W		L	PCT
North
Washington	10	–	0	1.000	18	–	2	.900
Idaho	6	–	4	.600	11	–	10	.524
Washington State	5	–	5	.500	9	–	14	.391
Oregon State	4	–	6	.400	12	–	8	.600
Oregon	3	–	7	.300	10	–	8	.556
Montana	2	–	8	.200	9	–	11	.450
South
California †	9	–	0	1.000	17	–	3	.850
Stanford	6	–	3	.667	13	–	6	.684
USC	2	–	7	.222	16	–	6	.727
UCLA	1	–	8	.111	7	–	9	.438
† Conference playoff series winner

The 1928–29 UCLA Bruins men's basketball team represented the University of California, Los Angeles during the 1928–29 NCAA men's basketball season and were members of the Pacific Coast Conference. The Bruins were led by eighth year head coach Caddy Works. They finished the regular season with a record of 7–9 and were fourth in the southern division with a record of 1–8.

== Previous season ==
The Bruins finished the season 10–5 overall and were third in the PCC south division with a record of 5–4.

== Roster ==
1928–29 UCLA Bruins men's basketball team
Players
Coaches

Pos.	#	Name	Height	Weight	Year	Hometown
G		Robert Baker	—	—
G		Sam Balter (C)	—	—
C		Carl Knowles	—	—
F	26	Dick Linthicum	—	—
C		Frank Lubin	6 ft 5 in (1.96 m)	232 lb (105 kg)		Los Angeles, California
		Erwin Piper	—	—
G		Carl Shy	—	—
		Harold Smith	—	—
G		Al Sunseri	—	—
		Larry Wilde	—	—
C		William Woodroof	—	—
G		Milo Young	—	—

Head coach

Caddy Works

Assistant coach(es)

- Silas Gibbs (UCLA)
- Wilbur Johns (UCLA)

Legend

- (C) Team captain
- (S) Suspended
- (I) Ineligible
- (W) Walk-on
- Injured
- Current redshirt

Roster
Last update: 30 January 2018

== Schedule ==
Date time, TV	Rank^{#}	Opponent^{#}	Result	Record	Site city, state
Regular Season
December 14, 1928*		at Pomona	W 43–22	1–0	Claremont, CA
December 15, 1928*		at La Verne	W 46–24	2–0	La Verne
December 18, 1928*		Hollywood Athletic Club	W 40–23	3–0	Physical Education Building; Los Angeles, CA
December 22, 1928*		Los Angeles Athletic Club	W 43–25	4–0	Physical Education Building; Los Angeles, CA
December 28, 1928*		at Utah	W 32–28	5–0	Deseret Gymnasium; Salt Lake City, UT
December 29, 1928*		at Utah	L 28–44	5–1	Deseret Gymnasium; Salt Lake City, UT
January 4, 1929*		North Dakota	W 41–29	6–1	Olympic Auditorium; Los Angeles, CA
January 12, 1929		at Stanford	L 20–34	6–2 (0–1)	Stanford Pavilion; Stanford, CA
January 18, 1929		at California	L 21–26	6–3 (0–2)	Harmon Gym; Berkeley, CA
January 19, 1929		at California	L 31–35	6–4 (0–3)	Harmon Gym; Los Angeles, CA
January 26, 1929		vs. USC	L 23–28	6–5 (0–4)	Olympic Auditorium; Los Angeles, CA
February 1, 1929		Stanford	L 26–34	6–6 (0–5)	Olympic Auditorium; Los Angeles, CA
February 2, 1929		Stanford	L 24–32	6–7 (0–6)	Olympic Auditorium; Los Angeles, CA
February 9, 1929		vs. USC	L 31–39	6–8 (0–7)	Olympic Auditorium; Los Angeles, CA
February 16, 1929		California	L 31–47	6–9 (0–8)	Olympic Auditorium; Los Angeles, CA
February 23, 1929		vs. USC	W 44–33	7–9 (1–8)	Olympic Auditorium; Los Angeles, CA
*Non-conference game. ^{#}Rankings from AP Poll. (#) Tournament seedings in parentheses. All times are in Pacific Time.
