= 1929 Southern Conference men's basketball tournament =

- Classification: Division I
- Teams: 16
- Site: Municipal Auditorium; Atlanta, GA
- Champions: NC State Wolfpack (1st title)
- Winning coach: Gus Tebell (1st title)
- Top scorer: Frank Goodwin (NC State) (65 points)

1928–29 Southern Conference men's basketball standings
	Conf.				Overall
Team	W		L	PCT	W		L	PCT
Washington and Lee	7	–	1	.875	16	–	2	.889
North Carolina	12	–	2	.857	17	–	8	.680
Georgia Tech	10	–	2	.833	15	–	6	.714
Georgia	13	–	4	.765	18	–	6	.750
Tulane	9	–	4	.692	9	–	5	.643
Kentucky	7	–	4	.636	12	–	5	.706
Tennessee	7	–	4	.636	11	–	5	.688
Alabama	10	–	6	.625	16	–	10	.615
Clemson	6	–	4	.600	15	–	12	.556
Duke	5	–	4	.556	12	–	8	.600
NC State †	6	–	5	.545	15	–	6	.714
Mississippi	7	–	8	.467	9	–	9	.500
Virginia Tech	5	–	7	.417	5	–	13	.278
Mississippi A&M	5	–	8	.385	8	–	15	.348
Virginia	3	–	6	.333	9	–	10	.474
LSU	5	–	9	.357	8	–	13	.381
South Carolina	4	–	10	.286	8	–	13	.381
Vanderbilt	2	–	5	.286	4	–	12	.250
Florida	4	–	11	.267	7	–	13	.350
Auburn	3	–	9	.250	6	–	15	.286
Maryland	2	–	6	.250	7	–	9	.438
VMI	1	–	7	.125	6	–	7	.462
Sewanee	0	–	7	.000	3	–	8	.273
† Southern Conference Tournament winner

The 1929 Southern Conference men's basketball tournament took place from March 1–March 4, 1929, at Municipal Auditorium in Atlanta, Georgia. The NC State Wolfpack won their first Southern Conference title, led by head coach Gus Tebell.

== Bracket ==
First round March 1
Washington & Lee	32
LSU	22
Mississippi	37
Maryland	35
NC State	48
Tennessee	32
Clemson	30
Georgia Tech	26
Georgia	42
Auburn	24
Kentucky	29
Tulane	15
Alabama	32
Duke	38
North Carolina	43
Mississippi A&M	18

Quarterfinals; March 2
Washington & Lee	28
Mississippi	50
NC State	31
Clemson	28
Georgia	26
Kentucky	24
Duke	34
North Carolina	17

Semifinals; March 3
Mississippi	32
NC State	34
Duke	43
Georgia	37

Finals; March 4
NC State	44
Duke	35

* Overtime game

=== Championship ===
March 4

NC State 44, Duke 35
Pts: Frank Goodwin 14	Pts: Joe Croson 12

Municipal Auditorium, Atlanta, Georgia
Referees: Menton

== All-Southern tournament team ==
Player	Position	Class	Team
Billy Werber	G	Junior	Duke
Louis McGinnis	G	Sophomore	Kentucky
Robert Selby	F	Junior	Mississippi
Larry Haar	F	Junior	NC State
Frank Goodwin	C	Junior	NC State

== See also ==
- List of Southern Conference men's basketball champions
