= 1928–29 Michigan Wolverines men's basketball team =

American college basketball season

1928–29 Michigan Wolverines men's basketball
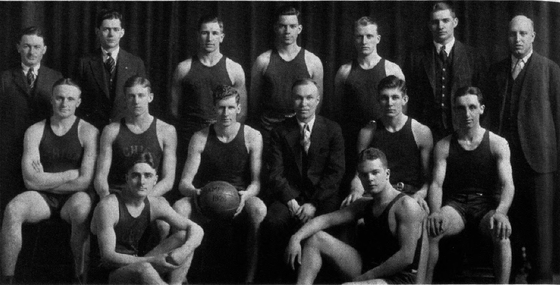

Big Ten regular season co-champions
- Conference: Big Ten Conference
- Record: 13–3 (10–2 Big Nine)
- Head coach: George F. Veenker
- Assistant coaches: Bennie Oosterbaan; Franklin Cappon; Ray Fisher (Freshman Coach)
- Captain: Ernie McCoy
- Home arena: Yost Field House

1928–29 Big Ten Conference men's basketball standings
	Conf.				Overall
Team	W		L	PCT	W		L	PCT
Wisconsin	10	–	2	.833	15	–	2	.882
Michigan	10	–	2	.833	13	–	3	.813
Purdue	9	–	3	.750	13	–	4	.765
Northwestern	7	–	5	.583	12	–	5	.706
Illinois	6	–	6	.500	10	–	7	.588
Ohio State	6	–	6	.500	9	–	8	.529
Iowa	5	–	7	.417	9	–	8	.529
Indiana	4	–	8	.333	7	–	10	.412
Chicago	2	–	10	.167	5	–	11	.313
Minnesota	1	–	11	.083	4	–	13	.235

The 1928–29 Michigan Wolverines men's basketball team represented the University of Michigan in intercollegiate college basketball during the 1928–29 season. The team played its home games at Yost Arena on the school's campus in Ann Arbor, Michigan. The team tied for the Western Conference Championship with the Wisconsin Badgers. The team was led by captain Ernie McCoy, who was an All-American. George F. Veenker became the only coach in Michigan history to win the conference championship in his first season.

== Schedule ==
1928-29 Overall: 13-3 Big Ten: 10-2 (t-1st; Co-Champions) Head Coach: George Veenker Staff: Bennie Oosterbn, Frank Cappon & Ray Fisher (Freshmen) Captain: Ernest McCoy Home Arena: Yost Field House (7,500)

Date Rk Opponent H/A W/L Score +/-
12/7/1928 - Michigan State H L 24-31 -7
12/15/1928 - Penn H W 34-21 +13
1/1/1929 - Penn State H W 31-11 +20
1/2/1929 - Cornell H W 45-13 +32
1/5/1929 - Northwestern+ H W 32-20 +12
1/7/1929 - at Wisconsin+ A W 31-23 +8
1/12/1929 - at Iowa+ A W 36-25 +11
1/14/1929 - Illinois+ H W 21-17 +4
2/9/1929 - at Ohio State+ A W 34-24 +10
2/11/1929 - at Northwestern+ A L 23-24 -1
2/16/1929 - at Minnesota+ A W 23-18 +5
2/18/1929 - at Illinois+ A L 24-27 -3
2/23/1929 - Iowa+ H W 25-18 +7
2/25/1929 - Minnesota+ H W 28-19 +9
3/2/1929 - at Ohio State+ A W 27-26 +1
3/4/1929 - Wisconsin+ H W 37-22 +15
