= George R. Edwards =

American football and basketball coach

George Edwards
Biographical details
- Born: 1890
- Died: June 10, 1972 (aged 81–82)
- Education: Columbia, Missouri, U.S.

Playing career

Basketball
- 1910–1913: Missouri
- Position: Guard

Coaching career (HC unless noted)

Football
- 1914: Kansas Wesleyan
- 1917: Kansas Wesleyan

Basketball
- 1916–1917: Kansas Wesleyan
- 1926–1946: Missouri

Golf
- 1926–1941: Missouri

Administrative career (AD unless noted)
- 1942–1944: Missouri (SID)
- 1943–1945: Missouri

Head coaching record
- Overall: 4–11 (football); 188–178 (basketball)
- Tournaments: Basketball; 1–1 (NCAA)

Accomplishments and honors

Championships
- Basketball; 3 Big Six (1930, 1939, 1940)

George R. Edwards (1890 – June 10, 1972) was an American football, basketball, and golf coach and college athletics administrator. He was the fourth head football coach at Kansas Wesleyan University in Salina, Kansas, serving for two seasons, in 1914 and again in 1917, and compiling a record of 4–11. He was the head basketball coach at the University of Missouri from 1926 to 1946. He coached Missouri to a 181–172 record, winning three Big Six Conference championships and one NCAA tournament appearance. He also served as Missouri's athletic director from 1943 to 1945. Edwards grew up in Palmyra, Missouri. He died on June 10, 1972, at the age of 81, Columbia, Missouri. He was inducted into the Missouri Athletics Hall of Fame in 1991.

== Head coaching record ==
=== College basketball ===
Record table
Season	Team	Overall	Conference	Standing	Postseason
Missouri Tigers (Missouri Valley Conference) (1926–1928)
1926–27	Missouri	9–8	6–4	3rd	
1927–28	Missouri	13–5	13–5	2nd	
Missouri Tigers (Big Six Conference) (1928–1946)
1928–29	Missouri	11–7	7–3	2nd	
1929–30	Missouri	15–3	8–2	1st	
1930–31	Missouri	8–9	5–5	T–3rd	
1931–32	Missouri	9–9	6–4	T–2nd	
1932–33	Missouri	10–8	6–4	3rd	
1933–34	Missouri	10–8	6–4	T–2nd	
1934–35	Missouri	9–9	8–8	3rd	
1935–36	Missouri	5–12	2–8	6th	
1936–37	Missouri	7–9	2–8	5th	
1937–38	Missouri	9–9	4–6	T–3rd	
1938–39	Missouri	12–9	7–3	T–1st	
1939–40	Missouri	13–6	8–2	T–1st	
1940–41	Missouri	6–10	2–8	6th	
1941–42	Missouri	6–12	2–8	6th	
1942–43	Missouri	7–10	5–5	T–3rd	
1943–44	Missouri	10–9	5–5	T–3rd	NCAA Regional Third Place
1944–45	Missouri	8–10	5–5	T–3rd	
1945–46	Missouri	6–11	3–7	T–4th	
Missouri:		181–172 (.513)	110–104 (.514)		
Total:		181–172 (.513)			
National champion Postseason invitational champion Conference regular season champion Conference regular season and conference tournament champion Division regular season champion Division regular season and conference tournament champion Conference tournament champion
