= Alumni Memorial Gymnasium =

Sports venue at Duke University

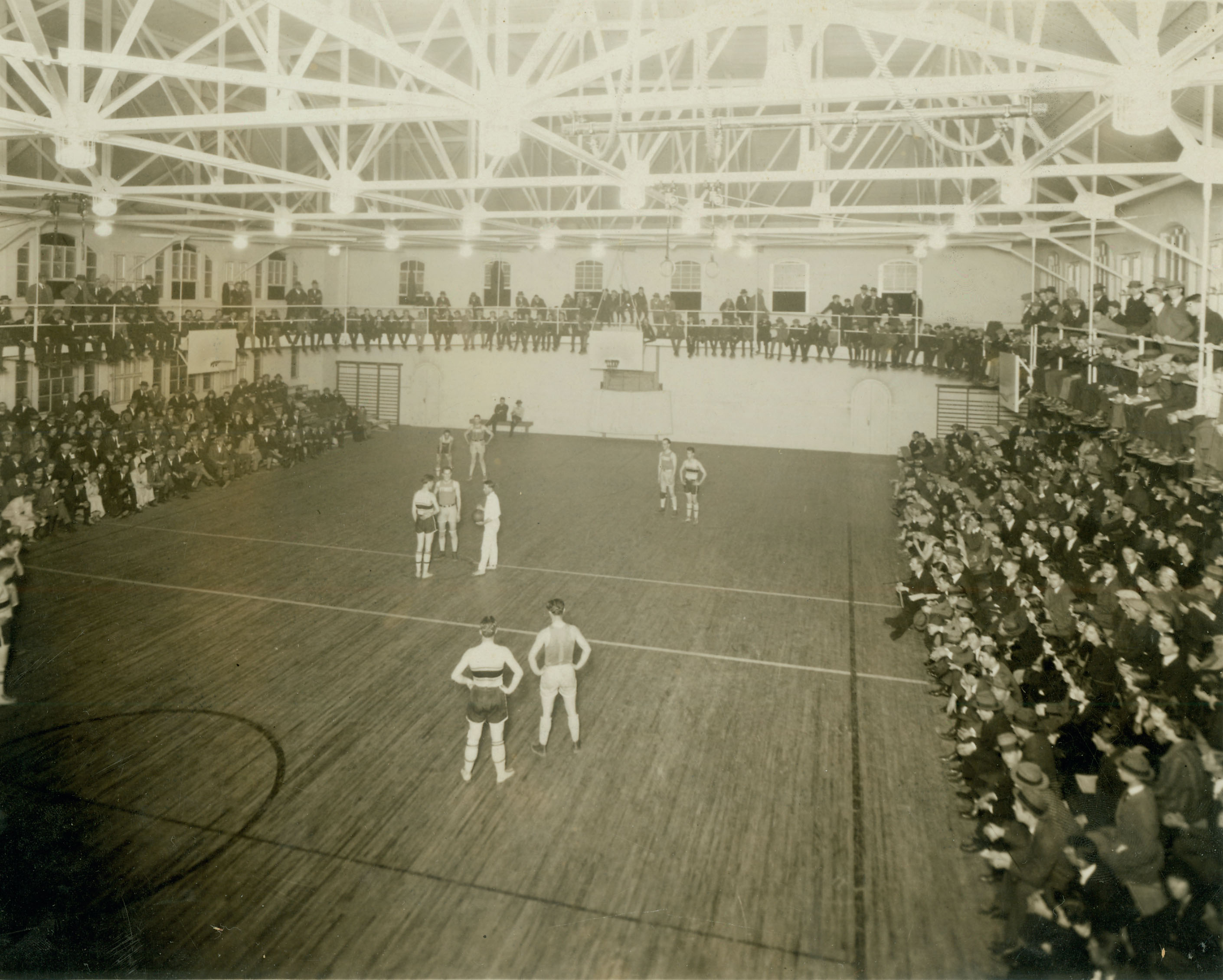
- Trinity vs. NC State in 1924
- Interactive map of Alumni Memorial Gymnasium
- Location: Brodie Recreation Center; 20 Brodie Gym Drive; Durham, NC 27705
- Coordinates: 36.007585°N 78.916873°W
- Owner: Duke University
- Operator: Duke University
- Capacity: 2,040

Construction
- Opened: 1923
- Cost: $150,000
- Architect: C.C. Hook

Tenant
- Duke Blue Devils (NCAA) 1924–1930

The Alumni Memorial Gymnasium is a building on the East Campus of Duke University in Durham, North Carolina, that opened in 1923. A 31,000 square foot addition to the facility, featuring a pool, indoor track, basketball courts, and aerobics and weight rooms, named the Keith and Brenda Brodie Recreation Center, was completed in 1996.

Opened in 1923, the gymnasium was home to the Duke Blue Devils men's basketball (known until 1924 as the Trinity Blue Devils) from 1924 to 1930. There was room for 1,400 fans downstairs and 600 spectators on the upstairs balcony for basketball games. The basketball team moved into Card Gymnasium in 1930.

The Alumni Memorial Gymnasium is within walking distance of the Angier B. Duke Gymnasium, its predecessor, also known as The Ark.
