= 1928–29 Illinois Fighting Illini men's basketball team =

American college basketball season

1928–29 Illinois Fighting Illini men's basketball
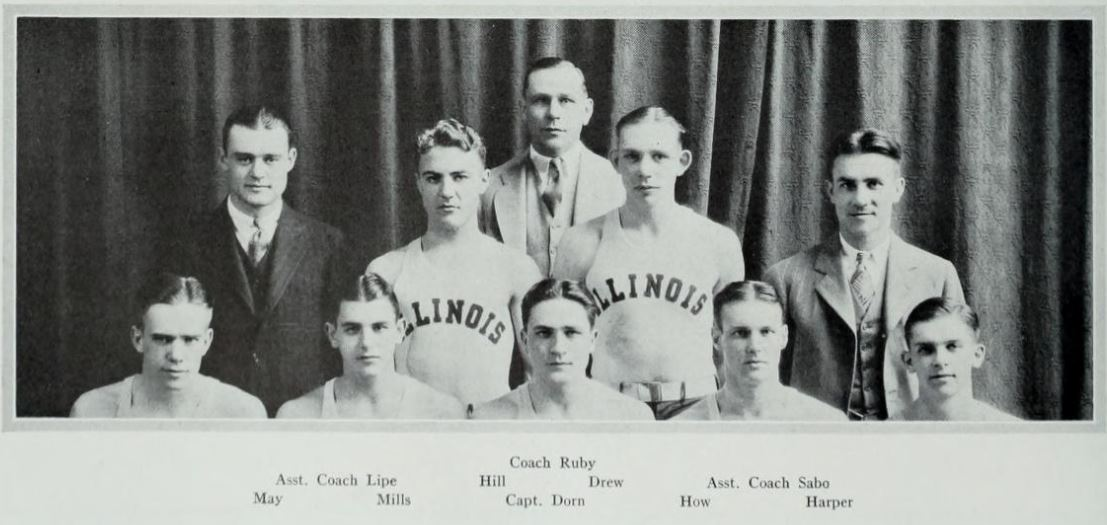
- Conference: Big Ten Conference
- Record: 10–7 (6–6 Big Ten)
- Head coach: J. Craig Ruby (7th season)
- Assistant coaches: Jack Lipe (5th season); John Sabo (1st season)
- Captain: Ernest Dorn
- Home arena: Huff Hall

1928–29 Big Ten Conference men's basketball standings
	Conf.				Overall
Team	W		L	PCT	W		L	PCT
Wisconsin	10	–	2	.833	15	–	2	.882
Michigan	10	–	2	.833	13	–	3	.813
Purdue	9	–	3	.750	13	–	4	.765
Northwestern	7	–	5	.583	12	–	5	.706
Illinois	6	–	6	.500	10	–	7	.588
Ohio State	6	–	6	.500	9	–	8	.529
Iowa	5	–	7	.417	9	–	8	.529
Indiana	4	–	8	.333	7	–	10	.412
Chicago	2	–	10	.167	5	–	11	.313
Minnesota	1	–	11	.083	4	–	13	.235

The 1928–29 Illinois Fighting Illini men's basketball team represented the University of Illinois.

== Regular season ==
The 1928–29 season was head coach Craig Ruby's seventh at the University of Illinois. With three returning starters from a team that finished in a ninth place tie in the Big Ten the year before, the Fighting Illini improved to an overall record of 10 wins and 7 losses and a conference record of 6 wins 6 losses. The starting lineup included captain Ernest F. Dorn at center, Charles Harper and Earl H. Drew at forward, and future head coach Douglas R. Mills and Herbert Hill at guard.

=== Roster ===
1928–29 Illinois Fighting Illini men's basketball team
Players
Coaches

Pos.	#	Name	Height	Weight	Year	Hometown
F	3	Charles Harper	5 ft 11 in (1.8 m)	164 lb (74 kg)	So	Chandlerville, Illinois
F	4	Earl Drew	6 ft 1 in (1.85 m)	165 lb (75 kg)	Sr	Champaign, Illinois
F	5	Ernest Dorn (C)	5 ft 10 in (1.78 m)	167 lb (76 kg)	Sr	Chicago, Illinois
C	6	Leon Fouts	6 ft 3 in (1.91 m)	185 lb (84 kg)	Jr	Omaha, Nebraska
G	7	Douglas R. Mills	5 ft 10 in (1.78 m)	162 lb (73 kg)	Jr	Elgin, Illinois
G	8	Andrew R. Solyom	6 ft 2 in (1.88 m)	180 lb (82 kg)	Jr	Hammond, Indiana
G	9	James W. Lewis	6 ft 3 in (1.91 m)	188 lb (85 kg)	Jr	Waukegan, Illinois
F	10	John D. How	6 ft 0 in (1.83 m)	175 lb (79 kg)	Sr	Lakeville, Indiana
G	11	Herbert Hill	5 ft 9 in (1.75 m)	150 lb (68 kg)	So	Elgin, Illinois
G	12	C. Donnelly Gamble	5 ft 10 in (1.78 m)	170 lb (77 kg)	Sr	Champaign, Illinois
G	14	Keston J. Deimling	6 ft 1 in (1.85 m)	188 lb (85 kg)	Sr	Stevens Point, Wisconsin
F	15	Richard Downing	5 ft 10 in (1.78 m)	163 lb (74 kg)	So	Mount Pulaski, Illinois
C	16	E. Horace May	6 ft 4 in (1.93 m)	185 lb (84 kg)	So	Chicago, Illinois
G	17	Carl H. Bergeson	5 ft 11 in (1.8 m)	160 lb (73 kg)	Jr	Batavia, Illinois
G	18	Raymond Eugene Fisher	5 ft 9 in (1.75 m)	170 lb (77 kg)	Jr	Champaign, Illinois
G	19	Edwin J. Simionich	5 ft 10 in (1.78 m)	173 lb (78 kg)	Sr	Joliet, Illinois
F	20	Fred Shankman	5 ft 7 in (1.7 m)	150 lb (68 kg)	So	Chicago, Illinois
F	21	James Dorsey	5 ft 7 in (1.7 m)	135 lb (61 kg)	So	Wilmington, Illinois
F	22	Huren Derment	5 ft 9 in (1.75 m)	148 lb (67 kg)	Jr	Champaign, Illinois
F	23	John Tarwain	6 ft 0 in (1.83 m)	179 lb (81 kg)	So	Sesser, Illinois
F	24	Rufus Glass	6 ft 2 in (1.88 m)	178 lb (81 kg)	Sr	Kokomo, Indiana
G	25	Robert Greene	6 ft 0 in (1.83 m)	155 lb (70 kg)	So	Peoria, Illinois
G	26	James Groutage	6 ft 0 in (1.83 m)	170 lb (77 kg)	Jr	Genton, Illinois
G	27	Glenn Hummer	6 ft 0 in (1.83 m)	160 lb (73 kg)	Jr	Huntington, Indiana
G	28	John H. Pribble	6 ft 1 in (1.85 m)	150 lb (68 kg)	Jr	Salem, Illinois
C	29	Theodore Blum	6 ft 3 in (1.91 m)	185 lb (84 kg)	Jr	Oak Park, Illinois
G	30	Walter Jolley	6 ft 1 in (1.85 m)	175 lb (79 kg)	Jr	Chicago, Illinois
G	31	Forrest 'Frosty' Peters	6 ft 0 in (1.83 m)	168 lb (76 kg)	Jr	Billings, Montana
F	32	Edwin Lashmet	5 ft 11 in (1.8 m)	165 lb (75 kg)	Sr	Winchester, Illinois
C	33	Louis Cotie	5 ft 11 in (1.8 m)	165 lb (75 kg)	Sr	Muskegon, Michigan
F	34	Roy Greene	5 ft 9 in (1.75 m)	160 lb (73 kg)	Sr	Renovo, Pennsylvania
G	35	Elmer Moos	6 ft 0 in (1.83 m)	160 lb (73 kg)	So	Aurora, Illinois
G	36	Palmer Muhl	5 ft 11 in (1.8 m)	157 lb (71 kg)	So	Oskaloosa, Iowa
G	37	James Snyder	5 ft 11 in (1.8 m)	168 lb (76 kg)	So	Chicago, Illinois
C	38	Donald Allen	6 ft 2 in (1.88 m)	185 lb (84 kg)	Sr	Long Point, Illinois

Head coach

- Craig Ruby (University of Missouri) (7th year)

Assistant coach(es)

- Jack Lipe (University of Illinois) (5th year)
- John Sabo (University of Illinois) (1st year)

Legend

- (C) Team captain
- (S) Suspended
- (I) Ineligible
- (W) Walk-on
- Injured
- Current redshirt

Roster

== Schedule ==
Date time, TV	Rank^{#}	Opponent^{#}	Result	Record	Site (attendance) city, state
Non-Conference regular season
12/10/1928*		Bradley	W 46–29	1–0	New Gymnasium (–); Champaign, IL
12/15/1928*		Lombard	W 44–22	2–0	New Gymnasium (5,429); Champaign, IL
12/20/1928*		North Dakota	W 28–27	3–0	New Gymnasium (–); Champaign, IL
12/31/1928*		Washington University	W 38–29	4–0	New Gymnasium (–); Champaign, IL
Big Ten regular season
1/5/1929		at Purdue	L 24–33	4–1 (0–1)	Jefferson High School (–); West Lafayette, IN
1/8/1929		Indiana; Rivalry	W 20–16	5–1 (1–1)	New Gymnasium (–); Champaign, IL
1/12/1929		at Ohio State	L 22–27	5–2 (1–2)	Ohio Expo Center Coliseum (–); Columbus, OH
1/14/1929		at Michigan	L 17–21	5–3 (1–3)	Yost Field House (–); Ann Arbor, MI
1/19/1929		University of Chicago	W 22–19	6–3 (2–3)	New Gymnasium (–); Champaign, IL
2/4/1929*		Butler	L 28–33	6–4	New Gymnasium (–); Champaign, IL
2/9/1929		at University of Chicago	W 33–29	7–4 (3–3)	Bartlett Gymnasium (–); Chicago, IL
2/11/1929		at Minnesota	W 35–32	8–4 (4–3)	University of Minnesota Armory (–); Minneapolis, MN
2/16/1929		Ohio State	L 30–35	8–5 (4–4)	New Gymnasium (5,570); Champaign, IL
2/18/1929		Michigan	W 27–24	9–5 (5–4)	New Gymnasium (6,373); Champaign, IL
2/23/1929		at Indiana; Rivalry	L 22–32	9–6 (5–5)	Men's Gymnasium (–); Bloomington, IN
3/2/1929		Purdue	L 23–37	9–7 (5–6)	New Gymnasium (7,001); Champaign, IL
3/4/1929		Minnesota	W 32–27	10–7 (6–6)	New Gymnasium (5,766); Champaign, IL
*Non-conference game. ^{#}Rankings from AP Poll. (#) Tournament seedings in parentheses. All times are in Central Time.
