= Bill Belanich =

American football and basketball player and coach (1903–1960)

Profile
- Positions: Tackle, end

Personal information
- Born: May 19, 1903; Euclid, Ohio, U.S.
- Died: August 13, 1960 (aged 57); Euclid, Ohio, U.S.
- Listed height: 6 ft 0 in (1.83 m)
- Listed weight: 205 lb (93 kg)

Career information
- High school: Cathedral Latin (OH)
- College: Dayton

Career history
- Dayton Triangles (1927–1929)

Career statistics
- Games: 19

Frank George "Bill" Belanich (May 19, 1903 – August 13, 1960), also known as "Box Car Bill", was an American football and basketball player and coach. He played college football at Dayton from 1924 to 1926 and was the captain of the 1926 Dayton Flyers football team. He later played professional football in the National Football League (NFL) as a tackle and end for the Dayton Triangles. He appeared in 19 NFL games, 18 as a starter, during the 1927, 1928, and 1929 seasons. He also served as the University of Dayton's basketball coach from 1929 to 1933. He died in 1960.
