= 1928–29 Wisconsin Badgers men's basketball team =

American college basketball season

1928–29 Wisconsin Badgers men's basketball

Big Ten Conference Co–Champions
- Conference: Big Ten Conference
- Record: 15–2 (10–2 Big Ten)
- Head coach: Walter Meanwell
- Captain: John Doyle and Elmer Tenhopen (co-captains)
- Home arena: Red Gym

1928–29 Big Ten Conference men's basketball standings
	Conf.				Overall
Team	W		L	PCT	W		L	PCT
Wisconsin	10	–	2	.833	15	–	2	.882
Michigan	10	–	2	.833	13	–	3	.813
Purdue	9	–	3	.750	13	–	4	.765
Northwestern	7	–	5	.583	12	–	5	.706
Illinois	6	–	6	.500	10	–	7	.588
Ohio State	6	–	6	.500	9	–	8	.529
Iowa	5	–	7	.417	9	–	8	.529
Indiana	4	–	8	.333	7	–	10	.412
Chicago	2	–	10	.167	5	–	11	.313
Minnesota	1	–	11	.083	4	–	13	.235

The 1928–29 Wisconsin Badgers men's basketball team represented University of Wisconsin–Madison. The head coach was Walter Meanwell, coaching his fifteenth season with the Badgers. The team played their home games at the Red Gym in Madison, Wisconsin and was a member of the Big Ten Conference.

== Schedule ==
Date time, TV	Rank^{#}	Opponent^{#}	Result	Record	Site city, state
Regular Season
12/10/1928*		Franklin (IN)	W 37–19	1–0	Red Gym; Madison, WI
12/15/1928*		vs. Pittsburgh	W 34–24	2–0	Milwaukee, WI
12/29/1928*		Lombard (IL)	W 29–12	3–0	Red Gym; Madison, WI
1/01/1929*		Carleton (MN)	W 32–24	4–0	Red Gym; Madison, WI
1/05/1929		at Minnesota	W 29–21	5–0 (1–0)	Minnesota Field House; Minneapolis, MN
1/07/1929		Michigan	L 23–31	5–1 (1–1)	Red Gym; Madison, WI
1/12/1929		at Chicago	W 33–21	6–1 (2–1)	Bartlett Gymnasium; Chicago, IL
1/14/1929		Indiana	W 24–20	7–1 (3–1)	Red Gym; Madison, WI
1/19/1929		Minnesota	W 39–17	8–1 (4–1)	Red Gym; Madison, WI
1/21/1929		at Purdue	W 31–26	9–1 (5–1)	Memorial Gymnasium; West Lafayette, IN
2/12/1929*		Bradley	W 48–22	10–1	Red Gym; Madison, WI
2/16/1929		at Indiana	W 27–25	11–1 (6–1)	The Fieldhouse; Bloomington, IN
2/18/1929		Northwestern	W 37–23	12–1 (7–1)	Red Gym; Madison, WI
2/23/1929		at Northwestern	W 31–25	13–1 (8–1)	Patten Gymnasium; Evanston, IL
2/25/1929		Purdue	W 27–24	14–1 (9–1)	Red Gym; Madison, WI
3/04/1929		at Michigan	L 22–37	14–2 (9–2)	Yost Field House; Ann Arbor, MI
3/09/1929		Chicago	W 19–15	15–2 (10–2)	Red Gym; Madison, WI
*Non-conference game. ^{#}Rankings from AP Poll. (#) Tournament seedings in parentheses.
