= 1928–29 Washington Huskies men's basketball team =

American college basketball season

1928–29 Washington Huskies men's basketball

PCC Northern Division Champions
- Conference: Pacific Coast Conference
- Record: 18–2 (10–0 PCC)
- Head coach: Hec Edmundson (9th season)
- Captain: Monty Snider
- Home arena: UW Pavilion

1928–29 Pacific Coast Conference men's basketball standings
	Conf.				Overall
Team	W		L	PCT	W		L	PCT
North
Washington	10	–	0	1.000	18	–	2	.900
Idaho	6	–	4	.600	11	–	10	.524
Washington State	5	–	5	.500	9	–	14	.391
Oregon State	4	–	6	.400	12	–	8	.600
Oregon	3	–	7	.300	10	–	8	.556
Montana	2	–	8	.200	9	–	11	.450
South
California †	9	–	0	1.000	17	–	3	.850
Stanford	6	–	3	.667	13	–	6	.684
USC	2	–	7	.222	16	–	6	.727
UCLA	1	–	8	.111	7	–	9	.438
† Conference playoff series winner

The 1928–29 Washington Huskies men's basketball team represented the University of Washington for the 1928–29 NCAA college basketball season. Led by ninth-year head coach Hec Edmundson, the Huskies were members of the Pacific Coast Conference and played their home games on campus at the UW Pavilion in Seattle, Washington.

The Huskies were 18–0 overall in the regular season and 10–0 in conference play; first in the Northern division for a second consecutive year. Undefeated Washington hosted Southern division winner California in the Pacific Coast championship series, but lost two straight. It was the sixth consecutive win for the Southern division in the title series.

The National Invitation Tournament (NIT) debuted in 1938, and the NCAA Tournament in 1939.

== Postseason results ==
Date time, TV	Opponent	Result	Record	Site (attendance) city, state
Pacific Coast Conference Playoff Series
Fri, March 1	California; Game One	L 31–43	18–1	UW Pavilion (8,000); Seattle, Washington
Sat, March 2	California; Game Two	L 27–30	18–2	UW Pavilion (8,000); Seattle, Washington
*Non-conference game. (#) Tournament seedings in parentheses. All times are in Pacific time.
