= 1928–29 Idaho Vandals men's basketball team =

American college basketball season

1928–29 Idaho Vandals men's basketball
- Conference: Pacific Coast Conference
- Record: 11–10 (6–4 PCC)
- Head coach: Rich Fox (2nd season)
- Assistant coach: Glenn Jacoby
- Home arena: Memorial Gymnasium

1928–29 Pacific Coast Conference men's basketball standings
	Conf.				Overall
Team	W		L	PCT	W		L	PCT
North
Washington	10	–	0	1.000	18	–	2	.900
Idaho	6	–	4	.600	11	–	10	.524
Washington State	5	–	5	.500	9	–	14	.391
Oregon State	4	–	6	.400	12	–	8	.600
Oregon	3	–	7	.300	10	–	8	.556
Montana	2	–	8	.200	9	–	11	.450
South
California †	9	–	0	1.000	17	–	3	.850
Stanford	6	–	3	.667	13	–	6	.684
USC	2	–	7	.222	16	–	6	.727
UCLA	1	–	8	.111	7	–	9	.438
† Conference playoff series winner

The 1928–29 Idaho Vandals men's basketball team represented the University of Idaho during the 1928–29 NCAA college basketball season. Members of the Pacific Coast Conference, the Vandals were led by second-year head coach Rich Fox and played their home games on campus at the new Memorial Gymnasium in Moscow, Idaho.

The Vandals were 11–10 overall and 6–4 in conference play.
