= 1928–29 Connecticut Aggies men's basketball team =

American college basketball season

1928–29 Connecticut Aggies men's basketball
- Conference: New England Conference
- Record: 11–6 (3–1 NEC)
- Head coach: Louis Alexander (2nd season)
- Home arena: Hawley Armory

1928–29 New England Conference men's basketball standings
	Conf.				Overall
Team	W		L	PCT	W		L	PCT
Rhode Island	4	–	1	.800	15	–	1	.938
Connecticut	3	–	1	.750	11	–	6	.647
New Hampshire	2	–	1	.667	10	–	4	.714
Northeastern	1	–	2	.333	9	–	7	.563
Maine	0	–	3	.000	3	–	9	.250

The 1928–29 Connecticut Aggies men's basketball team represented Connecticut Agricultural College, now the University of Connecticut, in the 1928–29 collegiate men's basketball season. The Aggies completed the season with an 11–6 overall record. The Aggies were members of the New England Conference, where they ended the season with a 3–1 record. The Aggies played their home games at Hawley Armory in Storrs, Connecticut, and were led by second-year head coach Louis Alexander.

== Schedule ==
Date time, TV	Rank^{#}	Opponent^{#}	Result	Record	Site (attendance) city, state
Regular Season
*		Pennsylvania Teachers	W 49–34	1–0	
		New Hampshire	W 44–25	2–0 (1–0)	
*		Tufts	W 29–27	3–0	
		Maine	W 29–22	4–0 (2–0)	
*		Massachusetts	W 21–13	5–0	
*		Wesleyan	L 23–36	5–1	
*		Trinity	L 28–29	5–2	
*		Providence	W 35–33	6–2	
*		Holy Cross	L 29–33	6–3	
*		Holy Cross	L 21–23	6–4	
		Rhode Island	L 25–30	6–5 (2–1)	
*		Coast Guard	W 49–42	7–5	
*		Vermont	W 34–25	8–5	
*		Springfield	L 19–28	8–6	
		Rhode Island	W 38–29	9–6 (3–1)	
*		Coast Guard	W 49–42	10–6	
*		Brown	W 35–33	11–6	
*Non-conference game. ^{#}Rankings from AP Poll. (#) Tournament seedings in parentheses. All times are in Eastern Time.

Schedule Source:
