= 1928–29 Montana State Bobcats men's basketball team =

American college basketball season

1928–29 Montana State Bobcats men's basketball

RMAC Champions Helms Foundation National Champions
- Conference: Rocky Mountain Athletic Conference
- Western
- Record: 36–2 (11–1 RMAC)
- Head coach: Schubert R. Dyche (1st season)

1928–29 Rocky Mountain Conference men's basketball standings
	Conf.				Overall
Team	W		L	PCT	W		L	PCT
Eastern
Colorado	10	–	2	.833	10	–	2	.833
Wyoming	11	–	3	.786	15	–	4	.789
Northern Colorado	8	–	6	.571	8	–	6	.571
Denver	7	–	7	.500	12	–	8	.600
Colorado Agricultural	6	–	6	.500	6	–	6	.500
Colorado College	6	–	6	.500	8	–	9	.471
Western State	1	–	9	.100	1	–	9	.100
Colorado School of Mines	1	–	11	.083	1	–	11	.083
Western
Montana State	11	–	1	.917	36	–	2	.947
BYU	6	–	6	.500	20	–	10	.667
Utah State	4	–	8	.333	8	–	10	.444
Utah	3	–	9	.250	5	–	12	.294

The 1928–29 Montana State Bobcats men's basketball team represented Montana State University during the 1928–29 NCAA men's basketball season in the United States. The head coach was Schubert R. Dyche, coaching in his first season with the Bobcats. The team finished the season with a 36–2 record and were the champions of the Rocky Mountain Athletic Conference. The team was retroactively named the national champion by the Helms Athletic Foundation and was retroactively listed as the top team of the season by the Premo-Porretta Power Poll. They defeated Amateur Athletic Union champion Cook's Painters in a best-of-three series. This team was later nicknamed the "Golden Bobcats" and is now a prominent part of the lore for the men's basketball program at Montana State University.

This Montana State squad is considered one of the best college teams in the first half of the 20th century. The 1928–29 season was a culmination of the entire decade in which the school revolutionized a fast break offense coupled with high-pressure defense, something that no other teams had ever done. Players John "Cat" Thompson and Frank Ward were named consensus All-Americans at the end of the season, and Thompson was later inducted into the Naismith Memorial Basketball Hall of Fame.
