= 1928–29 Buffalo Bisons men's basketball team =

American college basketball season

1928–29 Buffalo Bisons men's basketball
- Conference: Independent
- Record: 7–11
- Head coach: Art Powell (14th season)

The 1928–29 Buffalo Bisons men's basketball team represented the University of Buffalo during the 1928–29 NCAA college men's basketball season. The head coach was Art Powell, coaching his fourteenth season with the Bisons.

== Schedule ==
Date time, TV	Opponent	Result	Record	Site city, state
	Buffalo State	W 28–18	1–0	Buffalo, NY
	Toronto	W 27–24	2–0	Buffalo, NY
	Lehigh	W 25–24	3–0	Buffalo, NY
	R.P.I.	L 23–30	3–1	Buffalo, NY
	at Hamilton	L 31–37	3–2	Hamilton, NY
	at Colgate	L 21–33	3–3	Hamilton, NY
	Niagara	L 27–29	3–4	Buffalo, NY
	at Rochester	L 26–32	3–5	Rochester, NY
	Clarkson	L 28–32	3–6	Buffalo, NY
	at Clarkson	W 26–16	4–6	
	at St. Lawrence	W 31–25	4–7	Canton, NY
	at Niagara	W 31–21	5–7	Lewiston, NY
	Alfred	L 36–37	5–8	Buffalo, NY
	St. Lawrence	W 31–24	6–8	Buffalo, NY
	Hobart	L 30–31	6–9	Buffalo, NY
	Rochester	W 29–26	7–9	Buffalo, NY
	Carnegie Tech	L 23–33	7–10	Buffalo, NY
	Colgate	L 20–31	7–11	Buffalo, NY
*Non-conference game. (#) Tournament seedings in parentheses.
