= 1928–29 Cincinnati Bearcats men's basketball team =

American college basketball season

1928–29 Cincinnati Bearcats men's basketball

Buckeye Athletic Association Champions
- Conference: Buckeye Athletic Association
- Record: 13–4 (7–3 BAA)
- Head coach: Frank Rice (1st season)
- Captain: Dan Earley
- Home arena: Schmidlapp Gymnasium

The 1928–29 Cincinnati Bearcats men's basketball team represented the University of Cincinnati during the 1928–29 NCAA men's basketball season. The head coach was Frank Rice, coaching his first season with the Bearcats. The Bearcats repeated as Buckeye Athletic Association champions. The team finished with an overall record of 13–4.

== Schedule ==
Date time, TV	Opponent	Result	Record	Site city, state
December 15	Cedarville	W 32–28	1–0	Schmidlapp Gymnasium; Cincinnati, OH
December 19	at Central YMCA	L 27–34	1–1	Cleveland, OH
December 21	L.B. Harrison	W 35–21	2–1	Schmidlapp Gymnasium; Cincinnati, OH
December 29	Central YMCA	W 37–30	3–1	Schmidlapp Gymnasium; Cincinnati, OH
December 31	Georgetown (KY)	W 40–27	4–1	Schmidlapp Gymnasium; Cincinnati, OH
January 3	at Wittenberg	L 40–45 ^{OT}	4–2	Springfield, OH
January 12	at Miami	W 47–38	5–2	Oxford, OH
January 16	Ohio Wesleyan	L 40–42	5–3	Schmidlapp Gymnasium; Cincinnati, OH
January 19	at Denison	W 27–25	6–3	Granville, OH
January 25	Ohio	W 36–34	7–3	Schmidlapp Gymnasium; Cincinnati, OH
February 2	Wittenberg	W 29–19	8–3	Schmidlapp Gymnasium; Cincinnati, OH
February 9	Denison	W 38–25	9–3	Schmidlapp Gymnasium; Cincinnati, OH
February 13	Wilmington	W 32–24	10–3	Schmidlapp Gymnasium; Cincinnati, OH
February 16	at Ohio Wesleyan	L 34–54	10–4	Delaware, OH
February 22	at Ohio	W 38–36	11–4	Men's Gymnasium; Athens, OH
February 27	Dayton	W 33–22	12–4	Schmidlapp Gymnasium; Cincinnati, OH
February 28	Miami (OH)	W 40–32	13–4	Schmidlapp Gymnasium; Cincinnati, OH
*Non-conference game. (#) Tournament seedings in parentheses.
