= 1928–29 Niagara Purple Eagles men's basketball team =

American college basketball season

1928–29 Niagara Purple Eagles men's basketball
- Conference: Independent
- Record: 12–9
- Head coach: William McCarthy (2nd season)

The 1928–29 Niagara Purple Eagles men's basketball team represented Niagara University during the 1928–29 NCAA college men's basketball season. The head coach was William McCarthy, coaching his second season with the Purple Eagles.

== Schedule ==
Date time, TV	Opponent	Result	Record	Site city, state
	Ontario Aggies	W 51–11	1–0	Lewiston, NY
	Cornell	L 24–28	1–1	Lewiston, NY
	Fredonia State	W 30–22	2–1	Lewiston, NY
	Cornell	W 29–28	3–1	Lewiston, NY
	Albany Law	W 39–37	4–1	Lewiston, NY
	Johnstown K of C	W 32–24	5–1	Lewiston, NY
1/04/1929	at St. John's	L 18–35	5–2	Queens, NY
	Buffalo Normal	W 34–20	6–2	Lewiston, NY
	John Carroll	L 23–39	6–3	Lewiston, NY
	Buffalo	W 29–27	7–3	Lewiston, NY
	Rochester	L 30–37	7–4	Lewiston, NY
	Alfred	L 28–30	7–5	Lewiston, NY
	Clarkson Tech	W 22–18	8–5	Lewiston, NY
	Alfred	W 29–26	9–5	Lewiston, NY
	Rochester	W 30–29	10–5	Lewiston, NY
	Oberlin	W 21–15	11–5	Lewiston, NY
	Buffalo	L 21–31	11–6	Lewiston, NY
	St. Lawrence	W 23–21	12–6	Lewiston, NY
	Clarkson Tech	L 22–26	12–7	Lewiston, NY
	St. Lawrence	L 28–30	12–8	Lewiston, NY
	Carnegie Tech	L 26–44	12–9	Lewiston, NY
*Non-conference game. (#) Tournament seedings in parentheses.
