= 1928–29 Washington State Cougars men's basketball team =

American college basketball season

1928–29 Washington State Cougars men's basketball
- Conference: Pacific Coast Conference
- Record: 9–14 (5–5 PCC)
- Head coach: Jack Friel (1st season)
- Home arena: WSC Gymnasium

1928–29 Pacific Coast Conference men's basketball standings
	Conf.				Overall
Team	W		L	PCT	W		L	PCT
North
Washington	10	–	0	1.000	18	–	2	.900
Idaho	6	–	4	.600	11	–	10	.524
Washington State	5	–	5	.500	9	–	14	.391
Oregon State	4	–	6	.400	12	–	8	.600
Oregon	3	–	7	.300	10	–	8	.556
Montana	2	–	8	.200	9	–	11	.450
South
California †	9	–	0	1.000	17	–	3	.850
Stanford	6	–	3	.667	13	–	6	.684
USC	2	–	7	.222	16	–	6	.727
UCLA	1	–	8	.111	7	–	9	.438
† Conference playoff series winner

The 1928–29 Washington State Cougars men's basketball team represented Washington State College for the 1928–29 college basketball season. Led by first-year head coach Jack Friel, the Cougars were members of the Pacific Coast Conference and played their home games on campus at WSC Gymnasium in Pullman, Washington.

The Cougars were 9–14 overall in the regular season and 5–5 in conference play, third in the Northern division.

Alumnus Friel was the head coach at North Central High School in Spokane, and won the state title in his third and final season at NCHS in 1928. A former team captain and all-conference player under Fred Bohler, Friel led Washington State as head coach for three decades.
