= 1928–29 Duke Blue Devils men's basketball team =

American college basketball season

1928–29 Duke Blue Devils men's basketball

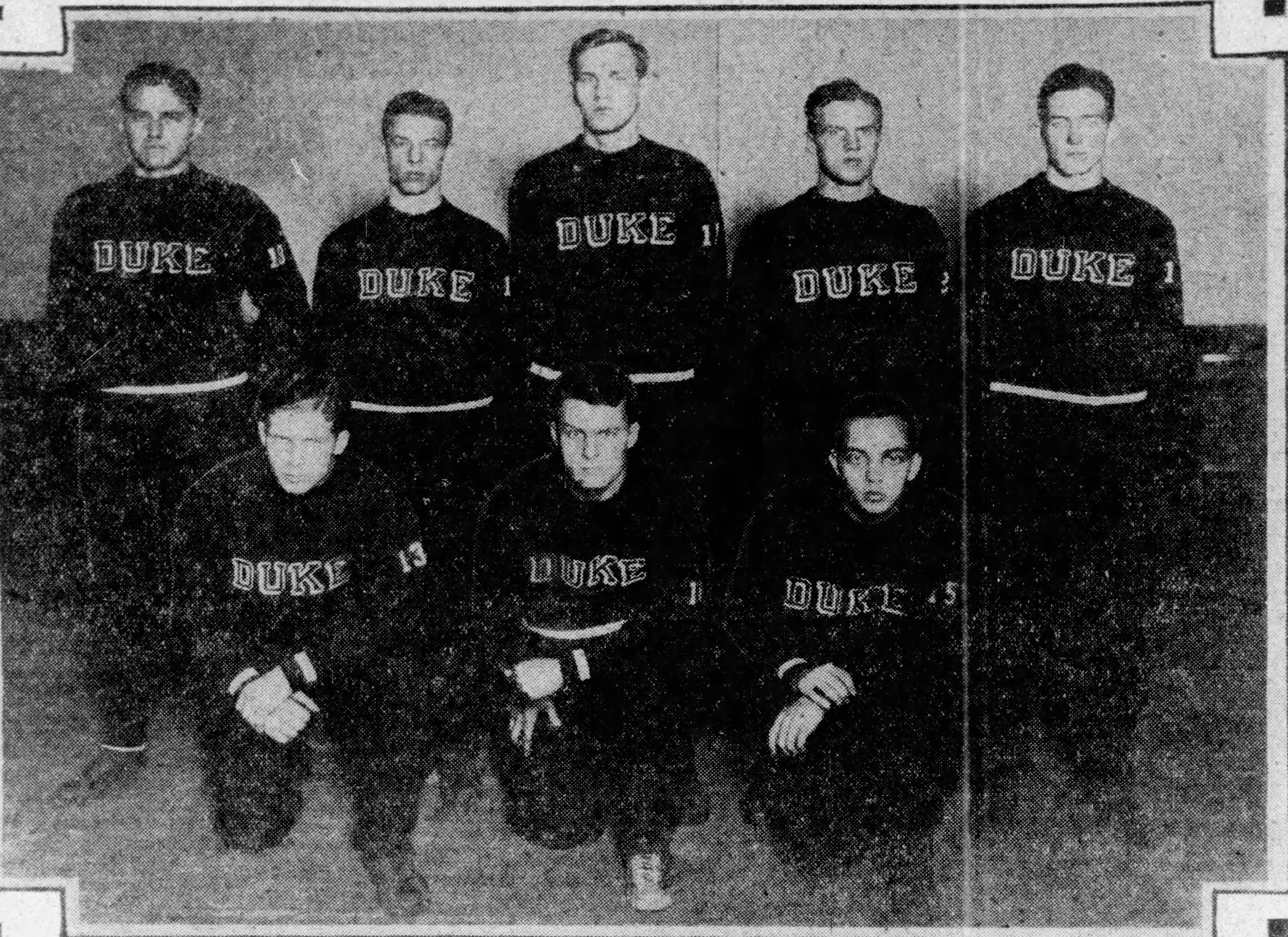
- Conference: Southern Conference
- Record: 12–8 (5–4 Southern)
- Head coach: Eddie Cameron
- Home arena: Alumni Memorial Gymnasium

The 1928–29 Duke Blue Devils men's basketball team represented Duke University during the 1928–29 men's college basketball season. The head coach was Eddie Cameron, coaching his first season with the Blue Devils. The team finished with an overall record of 12–8.
