= 1928–29 Indiana Hoosiers men's basketball team =

American college basketball season

1928–29 Indiana Hoosiers men's basketball
- Conference: Big Ten Conference
- Record: 7–10 (4–8 Big Ten)
- Head coach: Everett Dean (5th season)
- Captain: Dale Wells
- Home arena: The Fieldhouse

1928–29 Big Ten Conference men's basketball standings
	Conf.				Overall
Team	W		L	PCT	W		L	PCT
Wisconsin	10	–	2	.833	15	–	2	.882
Michigan	10	–	2	.833	13	–	3	.813
Purdue	9	–	3	.750	13	–	4	.765
Northwestern	7	–	5	.583	12	–	5	.706
Illinois	6	–	6	.500	10	–	7	.588
Ohio State	6	–	6	.500	9	–	8	.529
Iowa	5	–	7	.417	9	–	8	.529
Indiana	4	–	8	.333	7	–	10	.412
Chicago	2	–	10	.167	5	–	11	.313
Minnesota	1	–	11	.083	4	–	13	.235

The 1928–29 Indiana Hoosiers men's basketball team represented Indiana University. Their head coach was Everett Dean, who was in his 5th year. Due to growing popularity of the sport, the team moved to The Fieldhouse in Bloomington, Indiana to play its home games, and was a member of the Big Ten Conference.

The Hoosiers finished the regular season with an overall record of 7–10 and a conference record of 4–8, finishing 8th in the Big Ten Conference.

== Roster ==
No.	Name	Position	Ht.	Year	Hometown
2	Lucian Ashby	F	5–11	So.	Evansville, Indiana
3	Paul Jasper	C	6–2	So.	Fort Wayne, Indiana
4	Robert Correll	G	6–1	Sr.	Bloomington, Indiana
5	Dale Wells	F	6–1	Sr.	LaPorte, Indiana
6	James Strickland	F	6–2	Jr.	Owensville, Indiana
7	Branch McCracken	C	6–5	Jr.	Monrovia, Indiana
8	Claron Veller	G	5–9	So.	Linton, Indiana
9	Carl Scheid	G	6–1	Sr.	Vincennes, Indiana
10	Donald Cooper	F	6–1	Jr.	North Vernon, Indiana
11	Bernard Miller	F	6–1	So.	Waldron, Indiana
12	Jay Campbell	F	5–7	So.	Shelbyville, Indiana
13	James Gill	G	6–2	Jr.	Washington, Indiana
18	Leonard Miller	F	6–1	Jr.	Waldron, Indiana

== Schedule/results ==
Date time, TV	Rank^{#}	Opponent^{#}	Result	Record	Site city, state
Regular season
12/8/1928*		Washington (Mo.)	L 30–31	0–1	The Fieldhouse; Bloomington, IN
12/13/1928*		Pennsylvania	W 34–26	1–1	The Fieldhouse; Bloomington, IN
12/21/1928*		at Notre Dame	W 29–17	2–1	Notre Dame Fieldhouse; Notre Dame, IN
1/1/1929*		at Pittsburgh	L 31–52	2–2	Pitt Pavilion; Pittsburgh, PA
1/4/1929*		Missouri	W 41–29	3–2	The Fieldhouse; Bloomington, IN
1/8/1929		at Illinois; Rivalry	L 16–20	3–3 (0–1)	Huff Hall; Champaign, IL
1/12/1929		at Minnesota	W 37–36	4–3 (1–1)	Minnesota Field House; Minneapolis, MN
1/14/1929		at Wisconsin	L 20–24	4–4 (1–2)	Red Gym; Madison, WI
1/19/1929		Purdue; Rivalry	L 23–29	4–5 (1–3)	The Fieldhouse; Bloomington, IN
1/21/1929		Minnesota	W 41–22	5–5 (2–3)	The Fieldhouse; Bloomington, IN
2/5/1929		Northwestern	L 30–31	5–6 (2–4)	The Fieldhouse; Bloomington, IN
2/11/1929		at Iowa	L 27–29	5–7 (2–5)	Iowa Field House; Iowa City, IA
2/16/1929		Wisconsin	L 25–27	5–8 (2–6)	The Fieldhouse; Bloomington, IN
2/18/1929		at Purdue; Rivalry	L 16–30	5–9 (2–7)	Lafayette Jefferson HS Gymnasium; West Lafayette, IN
2/25/1929		at Northwestern	L 26–28	5–10 (2–8)	Old Patten Gymnasium; Evanston, IL
2/26/1929		Illinois; Rivalry	W 32–22	6–10 (3–8)	The Fieldhouse; Bloomington, IN
3/4/1929		Iowa	W 35–30	7–10 (4–8)	The Fieldhouse; Bloomington, IN
*Non-conference game. ^{#}Rankings from AP Poll. (#) Tournament seedings in parentheses.
