= Charles Bassett (basketball) =

American football and basketball coach

Coaching career (HC unless noted)

Football
- 1927–1928: Texas A&M (line)

Basketball
- 1927–1929: Texas A&M
- 1929–1933: Arkansas

Head coaching record
- Overall: 78–47 (college basketball)

Charles F. Bassett was an American football and college basketball coach.

He served as the head men's basketball coach at Texas A&M University from 1927 to 1929 and at the University of Arkansas from 1929 to 1933. During his time at Texas A&M, he also served as a line coach for the national championship 1927 Texas A&M Aggies football team.
