= Budig Hall =

Building in the University of Kansas

Coordinates: 38.95793°N 95.249265°W

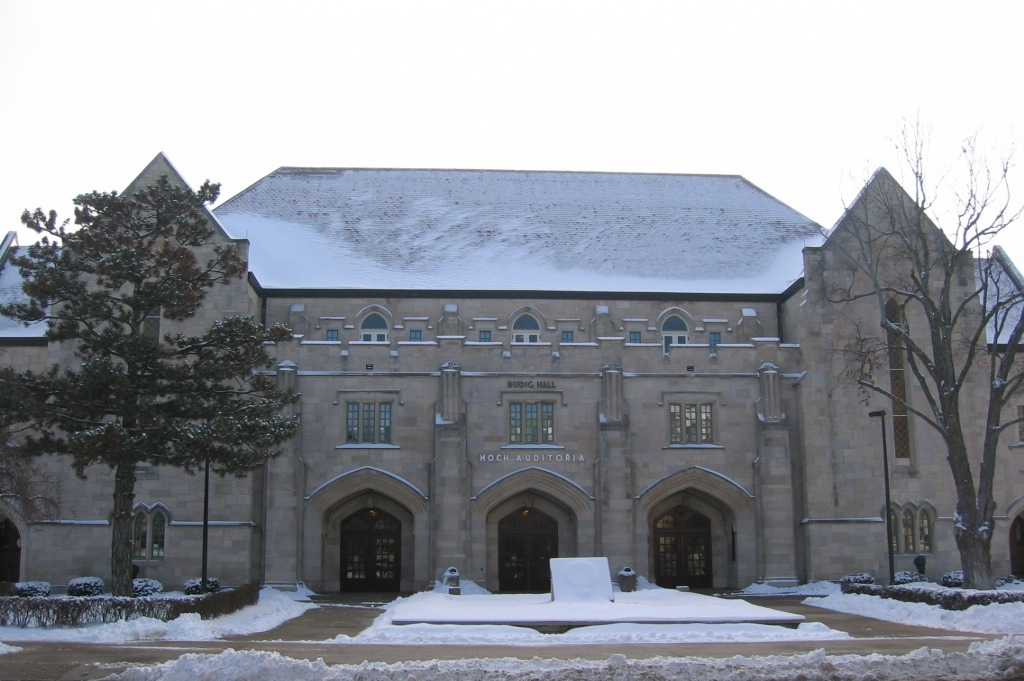
The front facade of Budig Hall

Budig Hall is an academic building on the main campus of the University of Kansas in Lawrence, Kansas. The building houses one 1,000-seat lecture hall, two 500-seat lecture halls, and a computer lab.

== Hoch Auditorium ==
Hoch Auditorium was a 5,500-seat multi-purpose arena on the same site that was built in 1927. It featured traditional Collegiate Gothic architecture on the exterior, with a full performance hall inside. A basketball court could be placed parallel to the stage and temporary seating placed on the stage, behind the benches on the floor. The Auditorium was named for Edward W. Hoch, 17th Governor of Kansas, member of the Board of Regents, and University supporter. It was home to the Kansas Jayhawks basketball teams until Allen Fieldhouse opened in 1955.

In 1957, Andrew McKinley was the tenor soloist in the world premiere of Cecil Effinger's oratorio The Invisible Fire at Hoch Auditorium with the Kansas City Philharmonic under conductor Thor Johnson.

In 1967, Hoch Auditorium became the site of a fatal accident when 15-year-old Lorraine Kelvin of Clayton, Missouri fell 64–70 feet (20–21 m) from a catwalk while attending the University of Kansas Midwestern Music and Arts Camp.

On the afternoon of June 15, 1991, Hoch Auditorium caught fire after being struck by lightning. The auditorium and stage area were completely destroyed; only the limestone facade and lobby area were spared.

When reconstruction of the building was complete in 1997, the rear half of the building was named Budig Hall, for then KU Chancellor Gene Budig. The original name on the facade was made plural to reflect the presence of multiple auditorium-style lecture halls within the building: Hoch Auditoria.

== See also ==
- List of oldest buildings on Kansas colleges and universities
- Kansas Jayhawks men's basketball § Facilities – A full list of the homes of the men's basketball team
