= List of North Carolina Tar Heels men's basketball seasons =

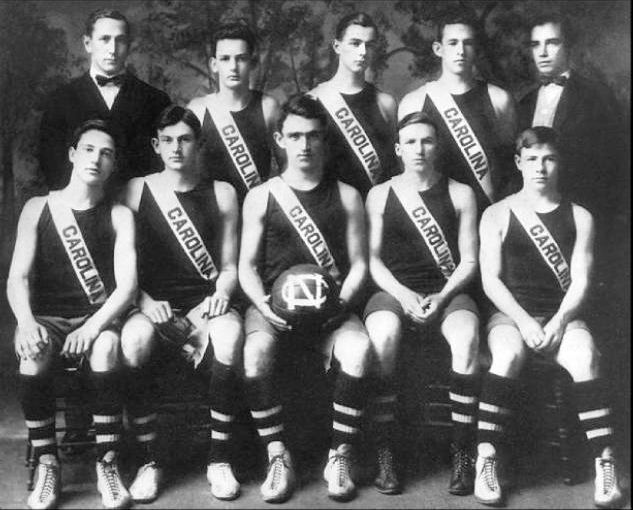
The 1910–11 men's basketball team

The men's basketball team of the University of North Carolina at Chapel Hill is referred to as the North Carolina Tar Heels, and they play in Division I of the National Collegiate Athletic Association (NCAA) in the Atlantic Coast Conference (ACC). The Tar Heels have played their games at the Dean Smith Center in Chapel Hill, North Carolina since 1986.

As of the 2009–10 season, North Carolina had the second most wins and the second highest winning percentage of any NCAA Division I men's team with a record of 2,004 wins and 720 losses over 100 seasons. The Tar Heels also have the most consecutive 20-win seasons, with 31 seasons from the 1970–71 season through 2000–01 season. The Tar Heels have won the NCAA Division I men's basketball tournament six times, have appeared in the tournament finals eleven times, a record 21 NCAA Final Fours, have made it into the NCAA tournament 47 times (tied for second-most all-time), and hold the record for all-time NCAA tournament victories (102). Additionally, the team has been the number one seed in the NCAA tournament 13 times, which is the most #1 seeds of all time, and has been ranked in the top 25 AP Poll 703 times (1st all-time), has beaten #1 teams a record 12 times, has the most consecutive 20-win seasons, with 31, North Carolina has also won the National Invitation Tournament, appeared in two NIT Semifinals, and has made five appearances in the NIT Tournament. North Carolina has had a top twenty-five final ranking among Division I schools 42 times as ranked by the Associated Press and 44 times as ranked by the Coaches Poll. In five instances the Tar Heels have ended the season with a number one ranking in the Associated Press, and the Tar Heels have also been ranked number one five times at the end of the season by the Coaches' Poll.

The Tar Heels played their first basketball game against Virginia Christian, on January 27, 1910, a 42–21 win for North Carolina. In 1921 North Carolina joined the Southern Conference. In the Southern Conference, the Tar Heels quickly found success. The 1923–24 Tar Heels squad went 26-0 and was retroactively awarded the national championship by the Helms Athletic Foundation in 1936. Overall, the Tar Heels played 32 seasons in the Southern Conference from 1921 to 1953. During that period they won 304 games and lost 111 for a winning percentage of 73.3%. The Tar Heels were winners of the regular season for nine times and won the Southern Conference championships 8 times.

In 1953, North Carolina split off from the Southern Conference and became a founding member of the Atlantic Coast Conference. Again, the Tar Heels quickly found success in their new conference. The Tar Heels won their first NCAA Championship under coach Frank McGuire in 1957, which was led by Lennie Rosenbluth and several other transplants from the New York City area. McGuire was forced to resign in 1961 after an NCAA violation regarding "improper recruiting entertainment" and was replaced by one of his assistants, Dean Smith.

Smith coached the Tar Heels from 1961 to 1997 and brought an unprecedented level of success to the team. When Smith retired in 1997, he had the most wins ever of any NCAA Division I men's basketball coach with 879 wins, and the 9th highest winning percentage with 77.6% wins. During Smith's time as head coach, North Carolina won the ACC regular season championship 17 times, won the ACC tournament 13 times, won the NIT in 1971, went to the NCAA tournament 27 times, appeared in 11 final fours, and won two NCAA national tournament titles, in 1982 and 1993. The 1982 National Championship team was led by James Worthy, Sam Perkins, and a young Michael Jordan. The 1993 National Championship team starred Donald Williams, George Lynch and Eric Montross. While at North Carolina, Smith helped promote desegregation by recruiting the university's first African American scholarship basketball player Charlie Scott.

Smith retired in 1997 and the head coaching position went to his assistant Bill Guthridge. In his three seasons as head coach Guthridge led the Tar Heels to the NCAA final Four twice, in the 1998 tournament and again in the 2000 tournament.

Guthridge retired in 2000 and North Carolina turned to the 38-year-old Matt Doherty to lead the Tar Heels. Doherty had mixed success while at Carolina. In his first season, the Heels shot to the #1 ranking in the polls in the middle of the Atlantic Coast Conference schedule and finished with an impressive 26–7 record. But Doherty's second season was the worst in recent history as the Tar Heels finished the season with a record of 8-20, missing postseason play entirely for the first time since the 1965–66 season (including a record 26 straight NCAA Tournament appearances) and finishing with a losing record for the first time since 1962 (Dean Smith's first year as coach). They also finished 4–12 in the ACC—only the program's second losing ACC record ever. The 12 losses were six more than the Tar Heels had ever suffered in a single season of ACC play, and placed them in a tie for 7th place—the program's first finish below fourth place ever. The season also saw the end of UNC's run of 31 straight 20-win seasons and 35 straight seasons of finishing third or higher in the ACC. After bringing in one of the top 5 incoming classes for the 2002–03 season, the Tar Heels started the season by knocking off a top 5 Kansas team and going on to win the Preseason NIT and returning to the AP top 25. Carolina went on to finish the season with a 17–15 record, barely missing the NCAA tournament. Matt Doherty led the Tar Heels to the third round of the NIT where they ended their season with a loss to Georgetown. Despite the turnaround from the year before and the late season playoff run, at the end of the season Matt Doherty was replaced as head coach by Roy Williams.

Roy Williams' first season was a moderate success with North Carolina finished 19-11 and the team was knocked out in the second round of the NCAA tournament by Texas. Williams was able to gain more success in his second season and coached North Carolina to a national championship in 2005. After winning the championship, Williams had to deal with the departure of the team's top seven scorers. Most thought that 2005–06 would be a down season for Williams, but the Tar Heels proved to be surprisingly successful in part due to the help of the freshman Tyler Hansbrough. Williams was named Coach of the Year for his ability to turn around such a new team to such a high level of success. Since 2005 the Tar Heels have once again become a leader in the ACC, winning both the regular season and the conference tournament in 2006–07 and 2007–08. In the 2008–09 season, North Carolina was chosen as consensus pre-season #1 and managed to fulfill the predictions of a national championship by beating Michigan State in the 2009 National Championship. However, the 2009-10 season ended up being a down season for the Tar Heels. The loss of players such as Ty Lawson and Tyler Hansbrough, along with numerous injuries to key players, proved too much to overcome and resulted in the Tar Heels missing the NCAA tournament for the first time since the 2002–03 season. The Tar Heels returned to the NCAA tournament in the ensuing years losing to Kentucky and Kansas in the Elite 8 during the 2010-11 and 2011-12 seasons respectively. In the 2015-16 season, Williams returned the Tar Heels to the NCAA Championship game where he sought his third national championship against Villanova. Marcus Paige hit an off-balance three-point shot to tie the game with 4.7 seconds left. However, Villanova's Kris Jenkins hit a buzzer-beating three pointer to defeat the Tar Heels 77–74. The Tar Heels returned to the 2017 National Championship game the following year where they defeated Gonzaga 71–65 to win their sixth NCAA title in program history.

== Season results ==
Record table
Season	Coach	Overall	Conference	Standing	Postseason
Nat Cartmell (Independent) (1910–1914)
1910–11	Nat Cartmell	7–4			
1911–12	Nat Cartmell	4–5			
1912–13	Nat Cartmell	4–7			
1913–14	Nat Cartmell	10–8			
Nat Cartmell:		25–24 (.510)			
Charles Doak (SAIAA) (1914–1916)
1914–15	Charles Doak	6–10		9th	
1915–16	Charles Doak	12–6		5th	
Charles Doak:		18–16 (.529)			
Howell Peacock (SAIAA) (1916–1918)
1916–17	Howell Peacock	5–4		7th	
1917–18	Howell Peacock	9–3		3rd	
Howell Peacock:		14–7 (.667)			
Rennie Cuthbertson (SAIAA) (1918–1919)
1918–19	Rennie Cuthbertson	9–7		7th	
Fred Boye (Independent) (1919–1921)
1919–20	Fred Boye	8–9		8th	
1920–21	Fred Boye	12–8		4th	
Fred Boye:		20–17 (.541)			
No Coach (Southern Conference) (1921–1923)
1921–22	No Coach	15–6	3–3	T–7th	
1922–23	No Coach	15–1	5–0	T–1st	
No Coach:		30–7 (.811)	8–3 (.727)		
Norman Shepard (Southern Conference) (1923–1924)
1923–24	Norman Shepard	26–0	7–0	T–1st	Helms National Champion
Monk McDonald (Southern Conference) (1924–1925)
1924–25	Monk McDonald	20–5	8–0	1st	
Harlan Sanborn (Southern Conference) (1925–1926)
1925–26	Harlan Sanborn	20–5	7–0	T–1st	
James Ashmore (Southern Conference) (1926–1931)
1926–27	James Ashmore	17–7	7–3	8th	
1927–28	James Ashmore	17–2	8–1	T–3rd	
1928–29	James Ashmore	17–8	12–2	2nd	
1929–30	James Ashmore	14–11	4–7	6th	
1930–31	James Ashmore	15–9	6–6	T–9th	
James Ashmore:		80–37 (.684)	37–19 (.661)		
George Shepard (Southern Conference) (1931–1935)
1931–32	George Shepard	16–5	6–3	T–5th	
1932–33	George Shepard	12–5	5–3	T–5th	
1933–34	George Shepard	18–4	12–2	T–2nd	
1934–35	George Shepard	23–2	12–1	1st	
George Shepard:		69–16 (.812)	35–9 (.795)		
Walter Skidmore (Southern Conference) (1935–1939)
1935–36	Walter Skidmore	21–4	13–3	2nd	
1936–37	Walter Skidmore	18–5	14–3	2nd	
1937–38	Walter Skidmore	16–5	13–3	1st	
1938–39	Walter Skidmore	10–11	8–7	7th	
Walter Skidmore:		65–25 (.722)	48–16 (.750)		
Bill Lange (Southern Conference) (1939–1944)
1939–40	Bill Lange	23–3	11–2	2nd	
1940–41	Bill Lange	19–9	14–1	1st	NCAA Elite Eight
1941–42	Bill Lange	14–9	9–5	7th	
1942–43	Bill Lange	12–10	8–9	11th	
1943–44	Bill Lange	17–10	9–1	1st	
Bill Lange:		85–41 (.675)	51–18 (.739)		
Ben Carnevale (Southern Conference) (1944–1946)
1944–45	Ben Carnevale	22–6	11–3	4th	
1945–46	Ben Carnevale	30–5	13–1	1st	NCAA Runner-up
Ben Carnevale:		52–11 (.825)	24–4 (.857)		
Tom Scott (Southern Conference) (1946–1952)
1946–47	Tom Scott	19–8	10–2	2nd	
1947–48	Tom Scott	20–7	11–4	3rd	
1948–49	Tom Scott	20–8	13–5	3rd	
1949–50	Tom Scott	17–12	13–6	5th	
1950–51	Tom Scott	12–15	9–8	9th	
1951–52	Tom Scott	12–15	8–11	11th	
Tom Scott:		100–65 (.606)	64–36 (.640)		
Frank McGuire (Southern Conference) (1952–1953)
1952–53	Frank McGuire	17–10	15–6	8th	
Frank McGuire (Atlantic Coast Conference) (1953–1961)
1953–54	Frank McGuire	11–10	5–6	5th	
1954–55	Frank McGuire	10–11	8–6	T–4th	
1955–56	Frank McGuire	18–5	11–3	T–1st	
1956–57	Frank McGuire	32–0	14–0	1st	NCAA University Division Champion
1957–58	Frank McGuire	19–7	10–4	T–2nd	
1958–59	Frank McGuire	20–5	12–2	T–1st	NCAA University Division first round
1959–60	Frank McGuire	18–6	12–2	T–1st	
1960–61	Frank McGuire	19–4	12–2	1st	
Frank McGuire:		164–58 (.739)	99–31 (.762)		
Dean Smith (Atlantic Coast Conference) (1961–1997)
1961–62	Dean Smith	8–9	7–7	T–4th	
1962–63	Dean Smith	15–6	10–4	3rd	
1963–64	Dean Smith	12–12	6–8	5th	
1964–65	Dean Smith	15–9	10–4	T–2nd	
1965–66	Dean Smith	16–11	8–6	T–3rd	
1966–67	Dean Smith	26–6	12–2	1st	NCAA University Division Final Four
1967–68	Dean Smith	28–4	12–2	1st	NCAA University Division Runner–up
1968–69	Dean Smith	27–5	12–2	1st	NCAA University Division Final Four
1969–70	Dean Smith	18–9	9–5	T–2nd	NIT first round
1970–71	Dean Smith	26–6	11–3	1st	NIT Champion
1971–72	Dean Smith	26–5	9–3	1st	NCAA University Division Final Four
1972–73	Dean Smith	25–8	8–4	2nd	NIT Third Place
1973–74	Dean Smith	22–6	9–3	T–2nd	NIT first round
1974–75	Dean Smith	23–8	8–4	T–2nd	NCAA Division I Sweet Sixteen
1975–76	Dean Smith	25–4	11–1	1st	NCAA Division I first round
1976–77	Dean Smith	28–5	9–3	1st	NCAA Division I Runner–up
1977–78	Dean Smith	23–8	9–3	1st	NCAA Division I first round
1978–79	Dean Smith	23–6	9–3	T–1st	NCAA Division I second round
1979–80	Dean Smith	21–8	9–5	T–2nd	NCAA Division I second round
1980–81	Dean Smith	29–8	10–4	2nd	NCAA Division I Runner–up
1981–82	Dean Smith	32–2	12–2	1st	NCAA Division I Champion
1982–83	Dean Smith	28–8	12–2	T–1st	NCAA Division I Elite Eight
1983–84	Dean Smith	28–3	14–0	1st	NCAA Division I Sweet Sixteen
1984–85	Dean Smith	27–9	9–5	T–1st	NCAA Division I Elite Eight
1985–86	Dean Smith	28–6	10–4	3rd	NCAA Division I Sweet Sixteen
1986–87	Dean Smith	32–4	14–0	1st	NCAA Division I Elite Eight
1987–88	Dean Smith	27–7	11–3	1st	NCAA Division I Elite Eight
1988–89	Dean Smith	29–8	9–5	T–2nd	NCAA Division I Sweet Sixteen
1989–90	Dean Smith	21–13	8–6	T–3rd	NCAA Division I Sweet Sixteen
1990–91	Dean Smith	29–6	10–4	2nd	NCAA Division I Final Four
1991–92	Dean Smith	23–10	9–7	3rd	NCAA Division I Sweet Sixteen
1992–93	Dean Smith	34–4	14–2	1st	NCAA Division I Champion
1993–94	Dean Smith	28–7	11–5	2nd	NCAA Division I second round
1994–95	Dean Smith	28–6	12–4	T–1st	NCAA Division I Final Four
1995–96	Dean Smith	21–11	10–6	3rd	NCAA Division I second round
1996–97	Dean Smith	28–7	11–5	T–2nd	NCAA Division I Final Four
Dean Smith:		879–254 (.776)	364–136 (.728)		
Bill Guthridge (Atlantic Coast Conference) (1997–2000)
1997–98	Bill Guthridge	34–4	13–3	2nd	NCAA Division I Final Four
1998–99	Bill Guthridge	24–10	10–6	3rd	NCAA Division I first round
1999–00	Bill Guthridge	22–14	9–7	T–3rd	NCAA Division I Final Four
Bill Guthridge:		80–28 (.741)	32–16 (.667)		
Matt Doherty (Atlantic Coast Conference) (2000–2003)
2000–01	Matt Doherty	26–7	13–3	T–1st	NCAA Division I second round
2001–02	Matt Doherty	8–20	4–12	T–7th	—
2002–03	Matt Doherty	19–16	6–10	T–6th	NIT Quarterfinal
Matt Doherty:		53–43 (.552)	23–25 (.479)		
Roy Williams (Atlantic Coast Conference) (2003–2021)
2003–04	Roy Williams	19–11	8–8	5th	NCAA Division I second round
2004–05	Roy Williams	33–4	14–2	1st	NCAA Division I Champion
2005–06	Roy Williams	23–8	12–4	2nd	NCAA Division I second round
2006–07	Roy Williams	31–7	11–5	T–1st	NCAA Division I Elite Eight
2007–08	Roy Williams	36–3	14–2	1st	NCAA Division I Final Four
2008–09	Roy Williams	34–4	13–3	1st	NCAA Division I Champion
2009–10	Roy Williams	20–17	5–11	T–9th	NIT Runner–up
2010–11	Roy Williams	29–8	14–2	1st	NCAA Division I Elite Eight
2011–12	Roy Williams	32–6	14–2	1st	NCAA Division I Elite Eight
2012–13	Roy Williams	25–11	12–6	3rd	NCAA Division I second round
2013–14	Roy Williams	24–10	13–5	T–3rd	NCAA Division I second round
2014–15	Roy Williams	26–12	11–7	4th	NCAA Division I Sweet Sixteen
2015–16	Roy Williams	33–7	14–4	1st	NCAA Division I Runner–up
2016–17	Roy Williams	33–7	14–4	1st	NCAA Division I Champion
2017–18	Roy Williams	26–11	11–7	T–3rd	NCAA Division I second round
2018–19	Roy Williams	29–7	16–2	T–1st	NCAA Division I Sweet Sixteen
2019–20	Roy Williams	14–19	6–14	T–13th	No postseason held (COVID)
2020–21	Roy Williams	18–11	10–6	T–5th	NCAA Division I first round
Roy Williams:		485–163 (.748)	212–94 (.693)		
Hubert Davis (Atlantic Coast Conference) (2021–2026)
2021–22	Hubert Davis	29–10	15–5	T–2nd	NCAA Division I Runner-up
2022–23	Hubert Davis	20–13	11–9	7th	Turned down NIT invitation
2023–24	Hubert Davis	29–8	17–3	1st	NCAA Division I Sweet Sixteen
2024–25	Hubert Davis	23–14	13–7	T–4th	NCAA Division I First Round
2025–26	Hubert Davis	24–9	12–6	T–4th	NCAA Division I First Round
Hubert Davis:		125–54 (.698)	68–30 (.694)		
Michael Malone (Atlantic Coast Conference) (2026–Present)
2026–27	Michael Malone	4–1	0–0		
Michael Malone:		4–1 (.800)	0–0 (–)		
Total:		2,423–884 (.733)			
National champion Postseason invitational champion Conference regular season champion Conference regular season and conference tournament champion Division regular season champion Division regular season and conference tournament champion Conference tournament champion

== Postseason playoff results ==
The NCAA tournament started in 1939 and the number of teams invited to participate has expanded a number of times over the years. Between 1939 and 1950 the tournament had only eight teams, and then between 1951 and 1974 the tournament varied between 16 teams and 25 teams. The tournament has continued to expand over the years, and there are now 68 teams that make it into the tournament. From 1941 to 1981, a third-place game was played as part of the Final Four.

The National Invitation Tournament, meanwhile, began in 1938 with only 6 teams. In 1941 the tournament was expanded to include 8 teams, in 1949 the tournament was again expanded to 12 teams, then 14 teams in 1965, 16 teams in 1968, 24 teams in 1979, 32 teams in 1980, and 40 teams from 2002 through 2006. The tournament reverted to 32 teams for 2007.

Over Tournament Record:

NCAA: 134-52 .720

NIT: 12-5 .705

NCAA Tournament Record by Seed:

#1 (18 times): 65-13 .833 National Championships: 5 - 1982, 1993, 2005, 2009, 2017

#2 (9 times): 23-9 .718

#3 (4 times): 3-4 .428

#4 (2 times): 4-2 .666

#6 (4 times): 3-4 .428

#8 (5 times): 12-5 .705

#11 (1 time): 1-1 .500

NCAA Tournament Record by Region:

East (27 times): 75-27 .735 (includes Final Four consolation games) National Championships: 3 - 1957, 1982, 1993

West (8 times): 14-8 .636

South (8 times): 19-6 .760 National Championships: 2 - 2009, 2017

Southeast (4 times): 11-4 .733

Midwest (4 times): 7-4 .636

Syracuse (1 time): 6-0 1.000 National Championships: 1 - 2005

Atlanta (1 time): 1-1 .500

Washington D.C. (1 time): 1-1 .500

Mideast (1 time): 0-1 .000

Tournament	Region (Seed)	Results	Reference
1941; NCAA tournament	East (-)	NCAA Elite 8 Lost First Round vs. Pittsburgh, 20–26; Lost Consolation Game vs. Dartmouth, 59–60	
1946; NCAA tournament	East (-)	NCAA finalist Won First Round vs. NYU, 57–49; Won Semifinals vs. Ohio State, 60–57 OT; Lost Final vs. Oklahoma A&M, 40–43	
1957; NCAA tournament	East (-)	NCAA Champion; Won First Round vs. Yale, 90–74; Won Sweet Sixteen vs. Canisius, 87–75; Won Elite Eight vs. Syracuse, 67–58; Won Final Four vs. Michigan State, 74–70 3OT; Won Finals vs. Kansas, 54–53 3OT	
1959; NCAA tournament	East (-)	NCAA Sweet 16; Lost First Round vs. Navy, 63–76	
1967; NCAA tournament	East (-)	NCAA final 4 Won Sweet Sixteen vs. Princeton, 78–70 OT; Won Elite Eight vs. Boston College, 96–80; Lost Final Four vs. Dayton, 62–76; Lost Consolation Game vs. Houston, 62–84	
1968; NCAA tournament	East (-)	NCAA finalist Won Sweet Sixteen vs. St. Bonaventure, 91–72; Won Elite Eight vs. Davidson, 70–66; Won Final Four vs. Ohio State, 80–66, Lost Finals vs. UCLA, 55–78	
1969; NCAA tournament	East (-)	NCAA final 4 Won Sweet Sixteen vs. Duquesne, 79–78; Won Elite Eight vs. Davidson, 87–85; Lost Final Four vs. Purdue, 65–92; Lost Consolation Game vs. Drake, 84–104	
1970; NIT		NIT first round Lost First Round vs. Manhattan, 95–90	
1971; NIT		NIT Champion; Won First Round vs. Massachusetts, 90–49; Won Quarterfinals vs. Providence, 86–79; Won Semifinals vs. Duke, 73–69, Won Finals vs. Georgia Tech, 84–66	
1972; NCAA tournament	East (-)	NCAA final 4 Won Sweet Sixteen vs. South Carolina, 92–69; Won Elite Eight vs. Penn, 73–59; Lost Final Four vs. Florida State, 75–79; Won Consolation Game vs. Louisville, 105–91	
1973; NIT		NIT Final Four; Won First Round vs. Oral Roberts, 82–65; Won Quarterfinals vs. UMass, 73–63; Lost Semifinals vs. Notre Dame, 71–78	
1974; NIT		NIT first round Lost First Round vs. Purdue, 82–71	
1975; NCAA tournament	East (-)	NCAA Sweet 16; Won First Round vs. New Mexico State, 93–69; Lost Sweet Sixteen vs. Syracuse, 76–78; Won Consolation Game vs. Boston College, 110–90	
1976; NCAA tournament	Mideast (-)	NCAA 1st Round; Lost First Round vs. Alabama, 64–79	
1977; NCAA tournament	East (-)	NCAA finalist Won First Round vs. Purdue, 69–66; Won Sweet Sixteen vs. Notre Dame, 79–77; Won Elite Eight vs. Kentucky, 79–72; Won Final Four vs. UNLV, 84–83; Lost Finals vs. Marquette, 59–67	
1978; NCAA tournament	West (-)	NCAA 1st Round; Lost First Round vs. San Francisco, 64–68	
1979; NCAA tournament	East (1)	NCAA 2nd Round; Lost Second Round vs. (9) Penn, 71–72	
1980; NCAA tournament	Midwest (3)	NCAA 2nd Round; Lost Second Round vs. (6) Texas A&M, 61–78 2OT	
1981; NCAA tournament	West (2)	NCAA finalist Won First Round vs. (10) Pitt, 74–57; Won Sweet Sixteen vs. (3) Utah, 61–56; Won Elite Eight vs. (8) Kansas State, 82–68; Won Final Four vs. (1) Virginia, 78–65; Lost Finals vs. (3) Indiana, 50–63	
1982; NCAA tournament	East (1)	NCAA Champion; Won First Round vs. (9) James Madison, 52–50; Won Sweet Sixteen vs. (4) Alabama, 74–69; Won Elite Eight vs. (3) Villanova, 70–60; Won Final Four vs. (6) Houston, 68–63; Won Finals vs. (1) Georgetown, 63–62	
1983; NCAA tournament	East (2)	NCAA Elite 8 Won First Round vs. (10) James Madison, 68–49; Won Sweet Sixteen vs. (3) Ohio State, 64–51; Lost Elite Eight vs. (4) Georgia, 77–82	
1984; NCAA tournament	East (1)	NCAA Sweet 16; Won First Round vs. (8) Temple, 77–66; Lost Sweet Sixteen vs. (4) Indiana, 68–72	
1985; NCAA tournament	Southeast (2)	NCAA Elite 8 Won First Round vs. (15) Middle Tenn St, 76–57; Won Second Round vs. (7) Notre Dame, 60–58; Won Sweet Sixteen vs. (11) Auburn, 62–56; Lost Elite Eight vs. (8) Villanova, 44–56	
1986; NCAA tournament	West (3)	NCAA Sweet 16; Won First Round vs. (14) Utah, 84–72; Won Second Round vs. (6) UAB, 77–59; Lost Sweet Sixteen vs. (2) Louisville, 79–94	
1987; NCAA tournament	East (1)	NCAA Elite 8 Won First Round vs. (16) Penn, 113–82; Won Second Round vs. (9) Michigan, 109–97; Won Sweet Sixteen vs. (5) Notre Dame, 74–68; Lost Elite Eight vs. (2) Syracuse, 75–79	
1988; NCAA tournament	West (2)	NCAA Elite 8 Won First Round vs. (15) North Texas, 83–65; Won Second Round vs. (10) Loyola Marymount, 123–97; Won Sweet Sixteen vs. (3) Michigan, 78–69; Lost Elite Eight vs. (1) Arizona, 52–70	
1989; NCAA tournament	Southeast (2)	NCAA Sweet 16; Won First Round vs. (15) Southern, 93–79; Won Second Round vs. (7) UCLA, 88–81; Lost Sweet Sixteen vs. (3) Michigan, 87–92	
1990; NCAA tournament	Midwest (8)	NCAA Sweet 16; Won First Round vs. (9) SW Missouri State, 83–70; Won Second Round vs. (1) Oklahoma, 79–77; Lost Sweet Sixteen vs. (4) Arkansas, 73–96	
1991; NCAA tournament	East (1)	NCAA final 4 Won First Round vs. (16) Northeastern, 101–66; Won Second Round vs. (9) Villanova, 84–69; Won Sweet Sixteen vs. (12) Eastern Michigan, 93–67; Won Elite Eight vs. (10) Temple, 75–72; Lost Final Four vs. (3) Kansas, 73–79	
1992; NCAA tournament	Southeast (4)	NCAA Sweet 16; Won First Round vs. (13) Miami (OH), 68–63; Won Second Round vs. (5) Alabama, 64–55; Lost Sweet Sixteen vs. (1) Ohio State, 73–80	
1993; NCAA tournament	East (1)	NCAA Champion; Won First Round vs. (16) East Carolina, 85–65; Won Second Round vs. (8) Rhode Island, 112–67; Won Sweet Sixteen vs. (4) Arkansas, 80–74; Won Elite Eight vs. (2) Cincinnati, 75–68 OT; Won Final Four vs. (2) Kansas, 78–68; Won Finals vs. (1) Michigan, 77–71	
1994; NCAA tournament	East (1)	NCAA 2nd Round; Won First Round vs. (16) Liberty, 71–51; Lost Second Round vs. (9) Boston College, 72–75	
1995; NCAA tournament	Southeast (2)	NCAA final 4 Won First Round vs. (15) Murray State, 80–70; Won Second Round vs. (7) Iowa State, 73–51; Won Sweet Sixteen vs. (6) Georgetown, 74–64; Won Elite Eight vs. (1) Kentucky, 74–61; Lost Final Four vs. (2) Arkansas, 68–75	
1996; NCAA tournament	East (6)	NCAA 2nd Round; Won First Round vs. (11) New Orleans, 83–62; Lost Second Round vs. (3) Texas Tech, 73–92	
1997; NCAA tournament	East (1)	NCAA final 4 Won First Round vs. (16) Fairfield, 82–74; Won Second Round vs. (9) Colorado, 73–56; Won Sweet Sixteen vs. (5) California, 63–57; Won Elite Eight vs. (6) Louisville, 97–74; Lost Final Four vs. (4) Arizona, 66–58	
1998; NCAA tournament	East (1)	NCAA final 4 Won First Round vs. (16) Navy, 88–52; Won Second Round vs. (8) UNC Charlotte, 93–83 OT; Won Sweet Sixteen vs. (4) Michigan State, 73–58; Won Elite Eight vs. (2) UConn, 75–64; Lost Final Four vs. (2) Utah, 59–66	
1999; NCAA tournament	West (3)	NCAA 1st Round; Lost First Round vs. (14) Weber State, 74–76	
2000; NCAA tournament	South (8)	NCAA final 4 Won First Round vs. (9) Missouri, 84–70; Won Second Round vs. (1) Stanford, 60–53; Won Sweet Sixteen vs. (4) Tennessee, 74–69; Won Elite Eight vs. (7) Tulsa, 59–55; Lost Final Four vs. (5) Florida, 59–71	
2001; NCAA tournament	South (2)	NCAA 2nd Round; Won First Round vs. (15) Princeton, 70–48; Lost Second Round vs. (7) Penn State, 74–82	
2003; NIT		NIT Quarterfinalist; Won First Round vs. DePaul, 83–72; Won Second Round vs. Wyoming, 90–74; Lost Quarterfinals vs. Georgetown, 74–79	
2004; NCAA tournament	Atlanta (6)	NCAA 2nd Round; Won First Round vs. (11) Air Force, 63–52; Lost Second Round vs. (3) Texas, 75–78	
2005; NCAA tournament	Syracuse (1)	NCAA Champion; Won First Round vs. (16) Oakland, 96–68; Won Second Round vs. (8) Iowa State, 92–65; Won Sweet Sixteen vs. (5) Villanova, 67–66; Won Elite Eight vs. (6) Wisconsin, 88–82; Won Final Four vs. (5) Michigan State, 87–71; Won Finals vs. (1) Illinois, 75–70	
2006; NCAA tournament	Washington D.C. (3)	NCAA 2nd Round; Won First Round vs. (14) Murray State, 69–65; Lost Second Round vs. (11) George Mason, 60–65	
2007; NCAA tournament	East (1)	NCAA Elite 8 Won First Round vs. (16) Eastern Kentucky, 86–65; Won Second Round vs. (9) Michigan State, 81–67; Won Sweet Sixteen vs. (5) USC, 74–64; Lost Elite Eight vs. (2) Georgetown, 84–96 OT	
2008; NCAA tournament	East (1)	NCAA final 4 Won First Round vs. (16) Mount St. Mary's, 113–74; Won Second Round vs. (9) Arkansas, 108–77; Won Sweet Sixteen vs. (4) Washington State, 68–47; Won Elite Eight vs. (3) Louisville, 83–73; Lost Final Four vs. Kansas, 66–84	
2009; NCAA tournament	South (1)	NCAA Champion; Won First Round vs. (16) Radford, 101–58; Won Second Round vs. (9) LSU, 84–70; Won Sweet Sixteen vs. (4) Gonzaga, 98–77; Won Elite Eight vs. (2) Oklahoma, 72–60; Won Final Four vs. (3)Villanova, 83–69; Won Finals vs. (2) Michigan St, 89–72	
2010; NIT		NIT Finalist; Won First Round vs. (5) William & Mary, 80–72; Won Second Round vs. (1) Mississippi State,76–74; Won Third Round vs. (2) Alabama–Birmingham,60–55; Won Semifinals vs. (2) Rhode Island, 68–67 OT; Lost Finals vs. (3) Dayton, 68–79	
2011; NCAA tournament	East (2)	NCAA Elite 8 Won First Round vs. (15) Long Island, 102–87; Won Second Round vs. (7) Washington, 86–83; Won Sweet Sixteen vs. (11) Marquette, 81–63; Lost Elite Eight vs. (4) Kentucky, 69–76	
2012; NCAA tournament	Midwest (1)	NCAA Elite 8 Won First Round vs. (16) Vermont, 77–58; Won Second Round vs. (8) Creighton, 87–73; Won Sweet Sixteen vs. (13) Ohio, 73–65 OT; Lost Elite Eight vs. (2) Kansas, 67–80	
2013; NCAA tournament	South (8)	NCAA 2nd Round; Won First Round vs. (9) Villanova, 78–71; Lost Second Round vs. (1) Kansas, 58–70	
2014; NCAA tournament	East (6)	NCAA 2nd Round; Won First Round vs. (11) Providence, 79–77; Lost Second Round vs. (3) Iowa State, 83–85	
2015; NCAA tournament	West (4)	NCAA Sweet Sixteen; Won First Round vs. (12) Harvard, 67–65; Won Second Round vs. (5) Arkansas, 87–78; Lost Sweet Sixteen vs. (1) Wisconsin, 72–79	
2016; NCAA tournament	East (1)	NCAA finalist Won First Round vs. (16) Florida Gulf Coast, 83–67; Won Second Round vs. (9) Providence, 85–66; Won Sweet Sixteen vs. (5) Indiana, 101–86; Won Elite Eight vs. (6) Notre Dame, 88–74; Won Final Four vs. (10) Syracuse, 83–66; Lost Finals vs. (2) Villanova, 74–77	
2017; NCAA tournament	South (1)	NCAA Champion; Won First Round vs. (16) Texas Southern, 103–64; Won Second Round vs. (8) Arkansas, 72–65; Won Sweet Sixteen vs. (4) Butler, 92–80; Won Elite Eight vs. (2) Kentucky, 75–73; Won Final Four vs. (3) Oregon, 77–76; Won Finals vs. (1) Gonzaga, 71–65	
2018; NCAA tournament	West (2)	NCAA 2nd Round; Won First Round vs. (15) Lipscomb, 84–66; Lost Second Round vs. (7) Texas A&M, 65–86	
2019; NCAA tournament	Midwest (1)	NCAA Sweet 16; Won First Round vs. (16) Iona, 88–73; Won Second Round vs. (9) Washington, 81–59; Lost Sweet Sixteen vs. (5) Auburn, 80–97	
2021; NCAA tournament	South (8)	NCAA 1st Round; Lost First Round vs. (9) Wisconsin, 62–85	
2022; NCAA tournament	East (8)	NCAA finalist Won First Round vs. (9) Marquette, 95–63; Won Second Round vs. (1) Baylor, 93–86; Won Sweet Sixteen vs. (4) UCLA, 73–66; Won Elite Eight vs. (15) St. Peters, 69–49; Won Final Four vs. (2) Duke, 81–77; Lost Finals vs. (1) Kansas, 69–72	
2024; NCAA tournament	West (1)	NCAA Sweet Sixteen; Won First Round vs. (16) Wagner, 90–62; Won Second Round vs. (9) Michigan State, 85–69; Lost Sweet Sixteen vs. (4) Alabama, 87–89	
2025; NCAA tournament	South (11)	NCAA 1st Round; Won First Four vs. (11) San Diego State, 95–68; Lost First Round vs. (6) Ole Miss, 64–71	
2026; NCAA tournament	South (6)	NCAA 1st Round; Lost First Round vs. (11) VCU, 78–82	
