= List of North Carolina Tar Heels men's basketball head coaches =

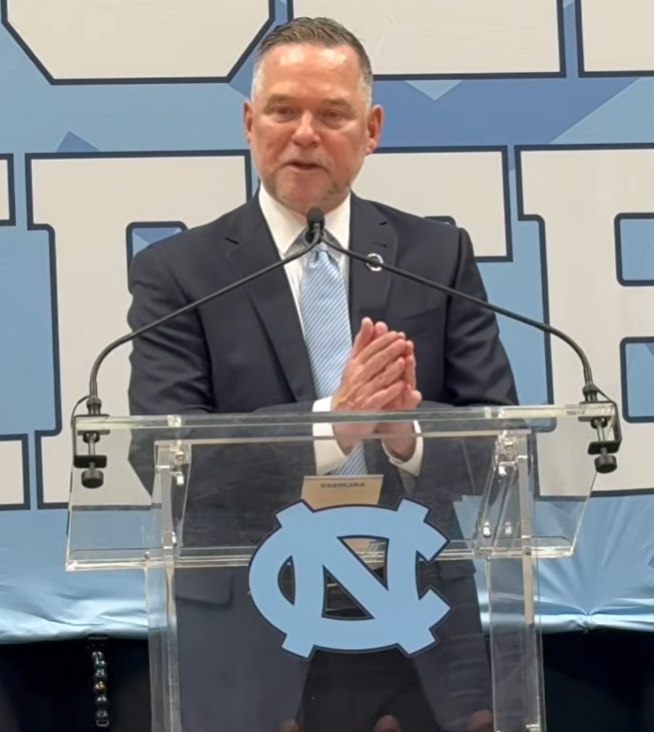
2023 NBA Championship winning coach Michael Malone was named the 20th head coach of the Tar Heels on April 7, 2026, becoming the first coach in nearly seventy years to come from outside the UNC basketball coaching tree.

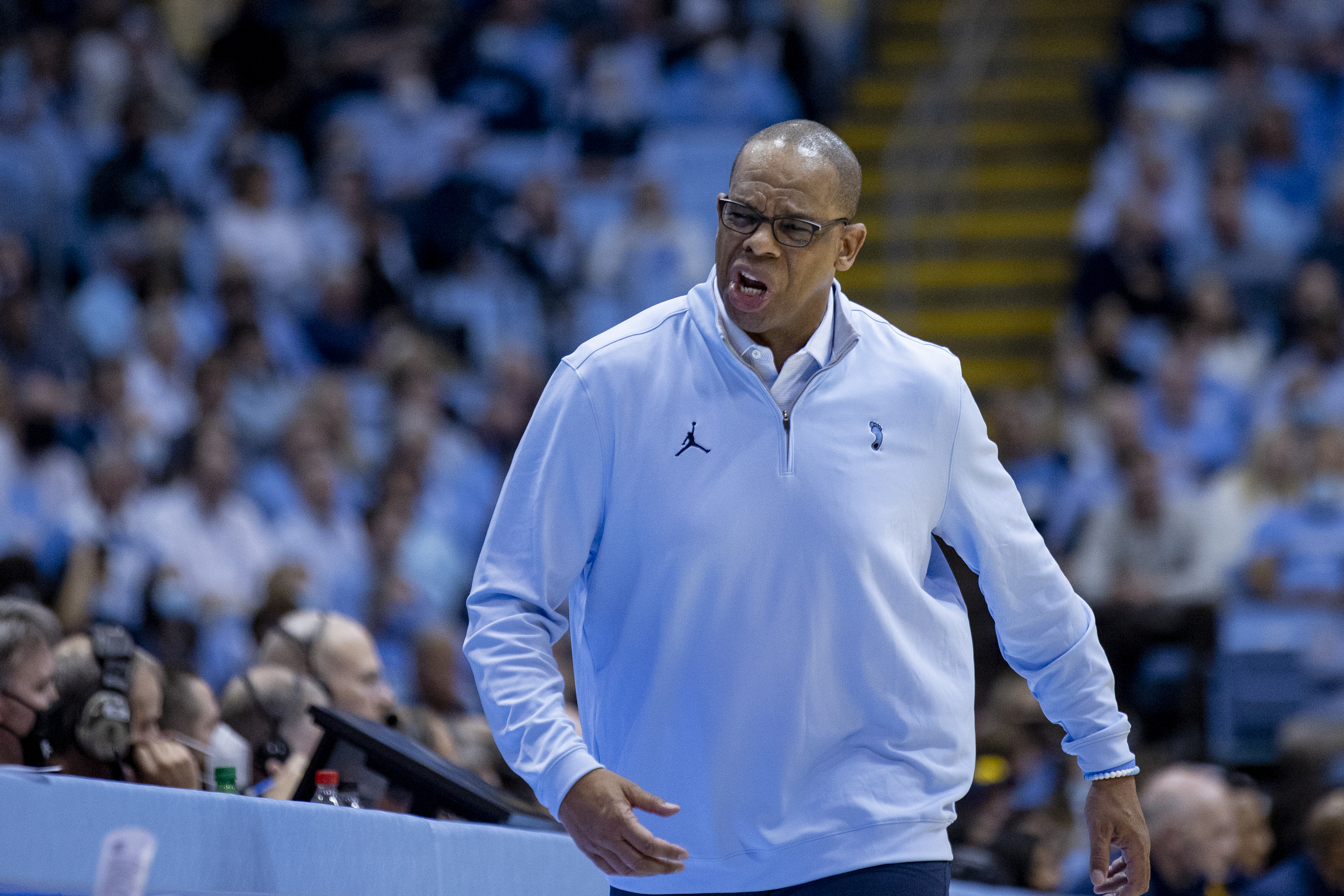
Former head coach and UNC player Hubert Davis was the first African-American to be Tar Heel head coach.

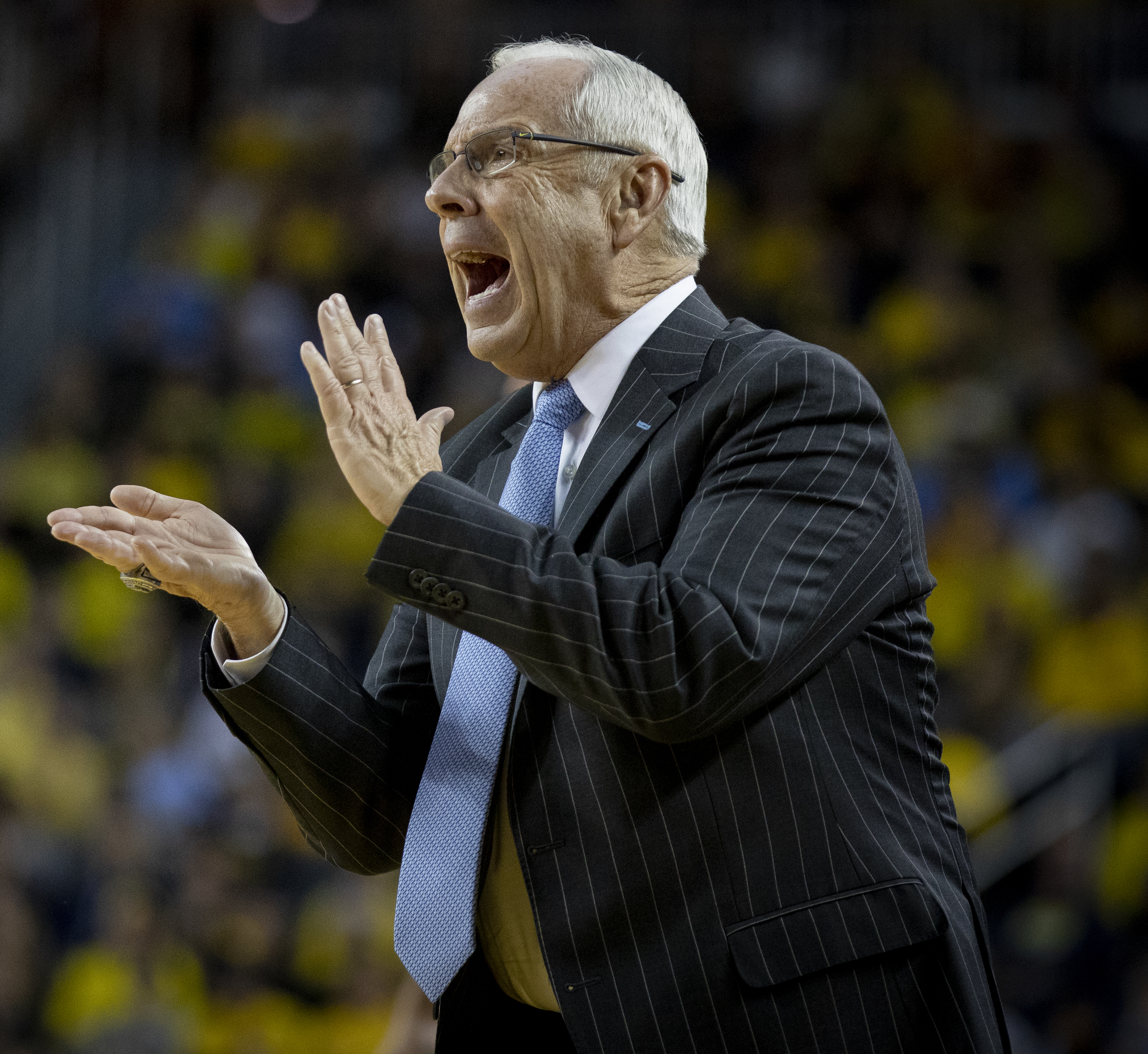
Roy Williams (2003–2021) led the Tar Heels to NCAA Championships in 2005, 2009, and 2017, the most by a head coach in school history.

The North Carolina Tar Heels men's basketball team plays at the Division I level of the National Collegiate Athletic Association (NCAA) in the Atlantic Coast Conference (ACC). The Tar Heels originally did not play within any athletic conference, but joined the Southern Conference in 1921 when it was first established. After playing in the Southern Conference for 22 years, North Carolina left in 1953 to join the newly created ACC. The Tar Heels play their home games in the Dean E. Smith Center, named after the 15th head coach Dean Smith. They previously played in Carmichael Auditorium, Woollen Gymnasium, The Tin Can, and began their existence playing in Bynum Gymnasium, which is now home to the admissions office for the university's graduate school programs.

There have been 20 head coaches in the history of Carolina basketball and the team has played two seasons without one. The program has played 3,151 games across 112 seasons from the program's inaugural 1910–11 season to the current year, 2021–22. Three Tar Heel coaches have led the team to an NCAA Men's Division I Basketball Championship: Frank McGuire in 1957; Smith in 1982 and 1993; and Roy Williams in 2005, 2009, and 2017. Smith, in 1971, led North Carolina to its only National Invitation Tournament (NIT) championship. North Carolina also received a retroactive national championship for the 1923–24 team coached by Norman Shepard, which was given by the Helms Athletic Foundation. Eleven coaches have won the conference regular season by having the best overall regular season record with the Tar Heels: Norman Shepard, Monk McDonald, Harlan Sanborn, Bo Shepard, Bill Lange, Walter Skidmore, Ben Carnevale, McGuire, Smith, Matt Doherty, and Williams. Eleven coaches have won the conference tournament with the Tar Heels: Norman Shepard, McDonald, Sanborn, Bo Shepard, Lange, Skidmore, Carnevale, McGuire, Smith, Bill Guthridge, and Williams.

Smith had the longest tenure at North Carolina, coaching for 36 seasons, and is the all-time leader in games coached (1,133) and wins at the school (879). Smith's 879 wins were the most of any NCAA men's Division I coach at the time of his retirement in 1997. Smith was the head coach for United States Men's Basketball that won an Olympic Gold Medal in 1976 while also working as the head coach of North Carolina, a feat that no other North Carolina coach has replicated. (Note: While Smith is the only coach to coach a gold medal winning team, Nat Cartmell won four Olympic medals, including one gold, for track and field events in the 1904 and 1908 Olympics.) Several coaches both played for and coached basketball at North Carolina. Davis, McDonald, and Doherty played for and coached the men's varsity basketball team. McDonald and Doherty played on teams that were awarded national championships, McDonald on the 1923–24 team and Doherty on the 1981–82 team. (Note: McDonald also won the first Patterson medal, the most prestigious award presented only to student-athletes at the University of North Carolina, for his collegiate career in 1924.) (Note: While Smith did not play on the North Carolina team in college, he did play college basketball for the University of Kansas. During his time on the varsity basketball team, Kansas won the national championship in 1952 against St. John's, which was coached by Frank McGuire at the time. Smith's National Championship as a player makes him the only North Carolina coach to both coach a team to the NCAA National Championship and to play on an NCAA National Championship team.) Williams both played for and coached the North Carolina men's junior varsity team. Davis also had a stint as the JV head coach while on the bench under Williams. Brothers Norman and Bo Shepard are the only two head coaches to be related to each other. Norman Shepard is the all-time leader in winning percentage, having never lost a game. Statistically, Cartmell has been the least successful coach of the Tar Heels, with a winning percentage of .510. No coach has had an overall losing record at North Carolina. Six coaches have received coaching awards while the head coach of North Carolina: Carnevale, McGuire, Smith, Guthridge, Doherty, and Williams. Carnevale, McGuire, Smith, and Williams have all been inducted into the Basketball Hall of Fame. Roy Williams was hired in 2003, and retired following a school-record three national championships in 2021.

Hubert Davis, who played under Smith from 1988 to 1992 and served as an assistant to Williams for nine seasons prior, was elevated to the head coach position in 2021. Upon Davis' appointment as head coach he became the first African-American to hold the position. In his first season, he took UNC to the NCAA National Championship game where they built a significant halftime lead but ultimately lost to Kansas. In 2024, his team won the ACC Regular season championship, captained by that year's ACC Player of the year R.J. Davis. Hubert Davis was let go in 2026 after losing in the first round of the 2026 NCAA tournament. His tenure was ultimately defined by inconsistent play, which led to being a 6 seed or higher in 3 out of 4 NCAA tournaments made and missing the tournament in 2023 after starting the season as the preseason #1 ranked team.

The current head coach is Michael Malone, the 2023 NBA champion coach of the Denver Nuggets. He is the first head coaching hire outside of the UNC family since McGuire.

== Statistics ==
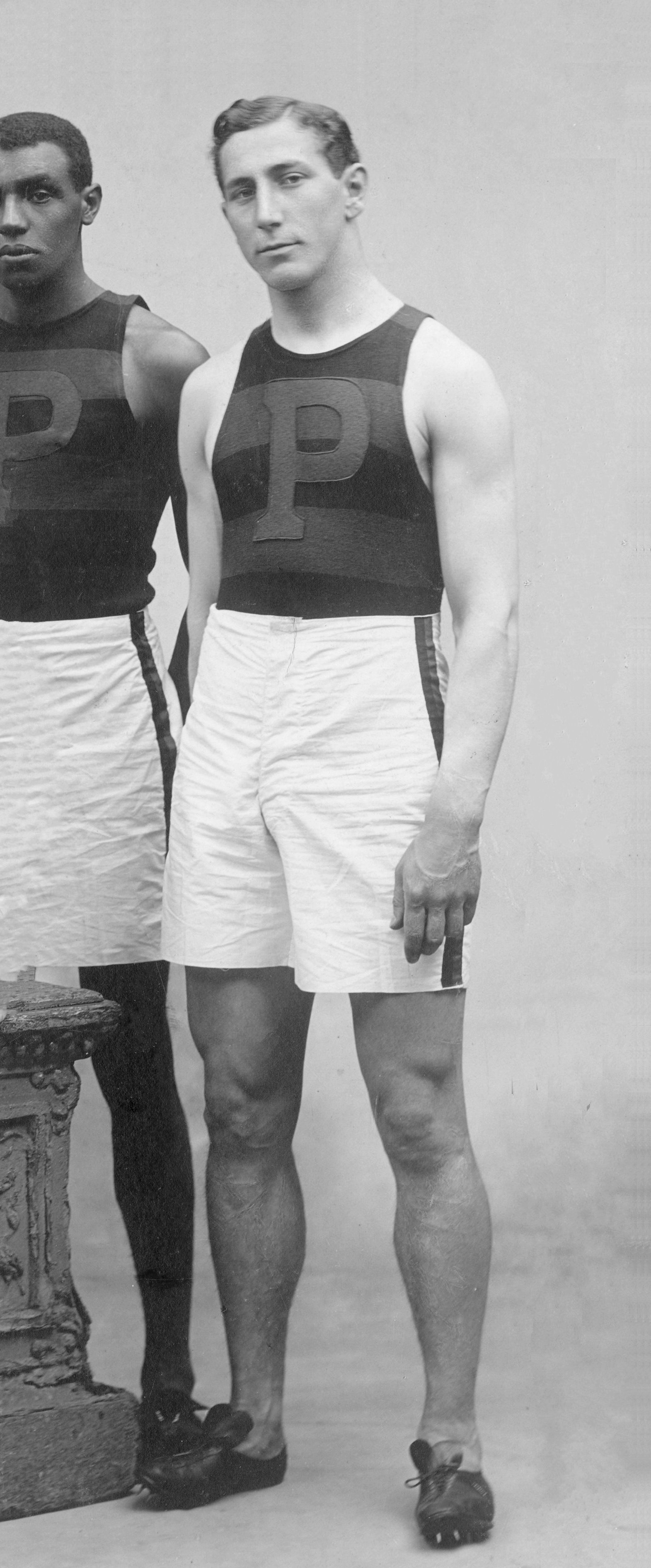
Nat Cartmell, a 1908 Olympic gold medalist in athletics, was the first basketball coach at UNC. He coached North Carolina from 1910 to 1914.

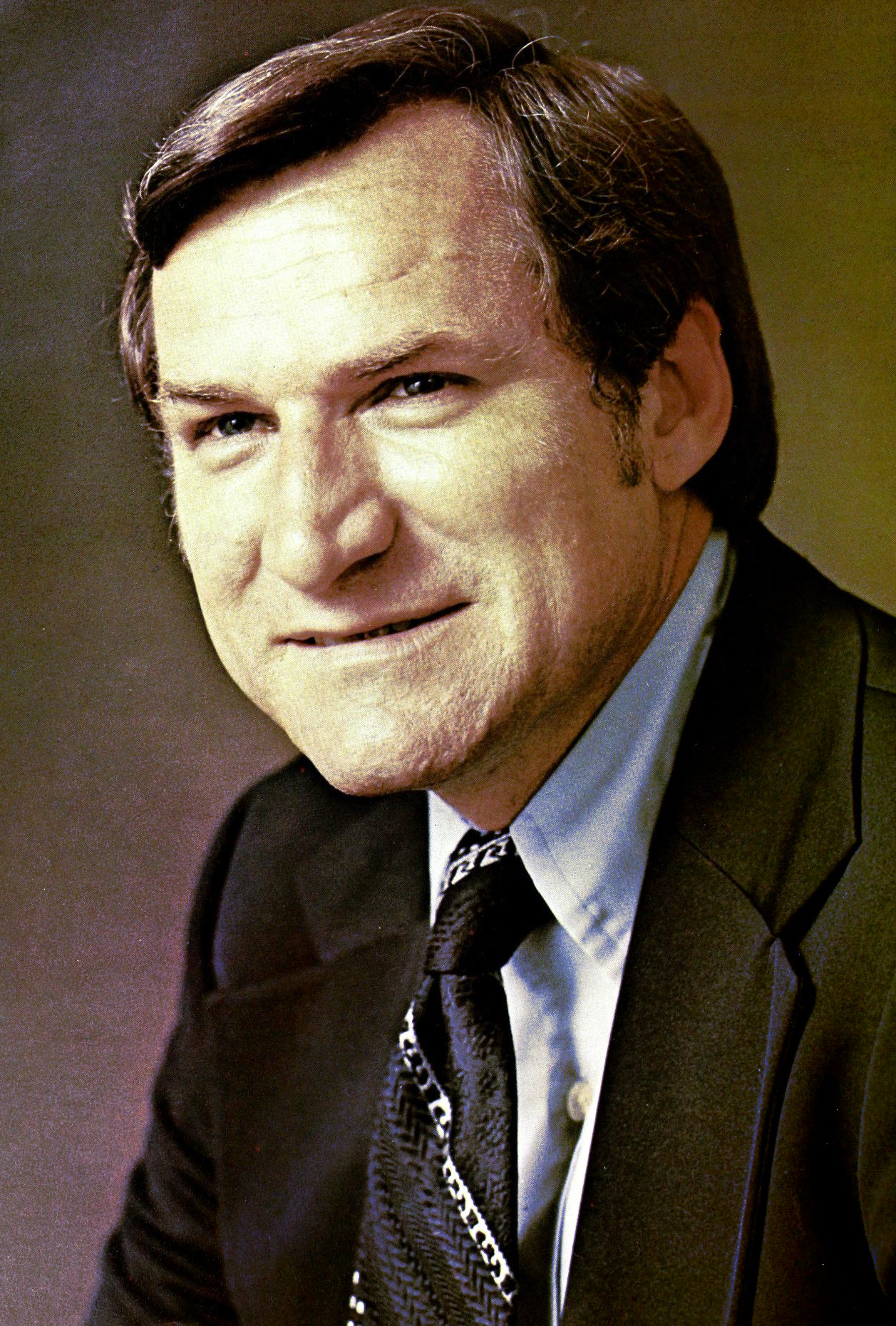
Dean Smith led the Tar Heels from 1961 to 1997 and won two national championships in 1982 and 1993. His 879 wins in Chapel Hill are the most by a coach at the school.

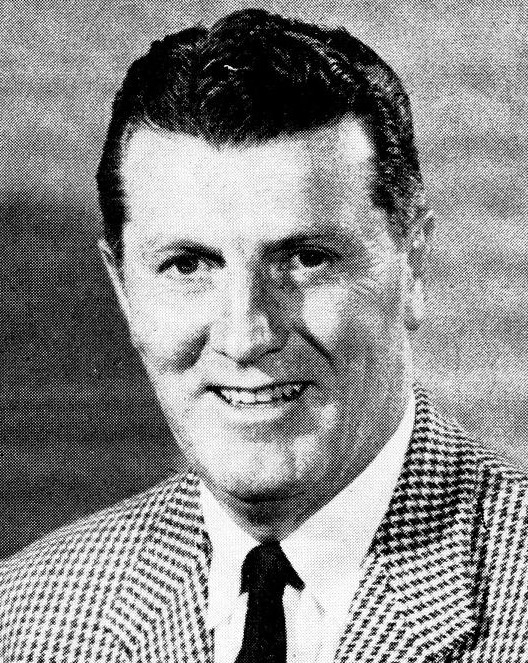
Frank McGuire led the 1956–57 Tar Heel team to a perfect season and their first NCAA national championship.

Key
#	Number of coaches (Note: A running total of the number of coaches of the Tar Heels. The seasons in which there was no head coach for the team are included in the table but they are not counted in the number of head coaches.)
GC	Games coached
OW	Overall Wins
OL	Overall Losses
O%	Winning percentage
CW	Conference Wins
CL	Conference Losses
C%	Winning percentage
RCs	Regular Season Conference Champions
CCs	Conference Tournament Champions
NCs	National Championships
^{♥}	Helms champion
^{‡}	NIT champion (Note: The National Invitational Tournament began in 1938 with only 6 teams. In 1941 the tournament was expanded to include 8 teams, in 1949 the tournament was again expanded to 12 teams, then 14 teams in 1965, 16 teams in 1968, 24 teams in 1979, 32 teams in 1980, and 40 teams from 2002 through 2006. The tournament reverted to 32 teams for 2007.)
^{♠}	NCAA tournament champion (Note: The NCAA tournament started in 1939 and the number of teams invited to participate has expanded a number of times over the years. Between 1939–1950 the tournament had only eight teams, and then between 1951–1974 the tournament varied between 16 teams and 25 teams. The tournament has continued to expand over the years until in 2005 there are now 65 teams that make it into the tournament.)

Coaching awards
^{†}	Elected to the Basketball Hall of Fame
FHOF	Fédération Internationale de Basketball (in English the International Basketball Federation) hall of fame
BHOF	Basketball Hall of Fame
NCHOF	National Collegiate Basketball Hall of Fame
LOCA	Legend of Coaching Award
SN	Sporting News Coach of the Year
NABC	National Association of Basketball Coaches Coach of the Year
N	Naismith Coach of the Year
BT	Basketball Times Coach of the Year
USBWA	U.S. Basketball Writers Association
UPI	United Press International Coach of the Year
CBS	CBS/Chevrolet Coach of the Year
AP	Associated Press College Basketball Coach of the Year
ARC	Adolph Rupp Cup
SY	Sportsman of the Year
OGM	Olympic Gold Medal
ACC	ACC Coach of the Year

Statistics are correct as of the 2024–25 college basketball season.

#	Name	Term	GC	OW	OL	O%	CW	CL	C%	RCs	CCs	NCs	Awards
1	Nat Cartmell	1910–1914	49	25	24	.510	—	—	—	—	—	—	—
2	Charles Doak	1914–1916	34	18	16	.529	—	—	—	—	—	—	—
3	Howell Peacock	1916–1918	21	14	7	.666	—	—	—	—	—	—	—
—	No official coach	1918–1919	16	9	7	.562	—	—	—	—	—	—	—
4	Fred Boye	1919–1921	37	20	17	.541	—	—	—	—	—	—	—
—	No coach	1921–1923	37	30	7	.811	8	3	0.727	1	1	—	—
5	Norman Shepard	1923–1924	26	26	0	1.000	7	0	1.000	1	1	1: 1924^{♥}	—
6	Monk McDonald	1924–1925	25	20	5	.800	8	0	1.000	1	1	—	—
7	Harlan Sanborn	1925–1926	25	20	5	.800	7	0	1.000	1	1	—	—
8	James Ashmore	1926–1931	117	80	37	.684	37	19	0.660	0	0	—	—
9	Bo Shepard	1931–1935	85	69	16	.812	35	9	0.795	1	1	—	—
10	Walter Skidmore	1935–1939	90	65	25	.722	48	16	0.750	1	1	—	—
11	Bill Lange	1939–1944	126	85	41	.675	51	18	0.739	2	1	—	—
12	Ben Carnevale^{†}	1944–1946	63	52	11	.825	24	4	0.857	1	1	—	BHOF (1970); NCHOF (2006) (Note: Ben Carnevale was also named College Coach of the Year in 1947 but during this time he was the head coach of Navy and not North Carolina.)
13	Tom Scott	1946–1952	165	100	65	.606	64	36	0.640	0	0	—	—
14	Frank McGuire^{†}	1952–1961	222	164	58	.739	99	31	0.762	5	1	1: 1957^{♠}	BHOF (1977); NCHOF (2006); UPI (1957) (Note: Frank McGuire was also named College Coach of the Year in 1952 when he was the head coach of St. John's and in 1970 when he was the head coach at South Carolina.); ACC (1957) (Note: Frank McGuire was also named ACC Coach of the Year in 1969 when he was the head coach of South Carolina.)
15	Dean Smith^{†}	1961–1997	1133	879	254	.776	364	136	0.728	17	13	3: 1971^{‡} 1982^{♠} 1993^{♠}	FHOF (2007); BHOF (1983); NCHOF (2006); NABC (1977); USBWA (1979); N (1993); BT (1993); LOCA (1993); ACC (1967, 1968, 1971, 1976, 1977, 1979, 1988, 1993); OGM (1976); SY (1997)
16	Bill Guthridge	1997–2000	108	80	28	.741	32	16	0.667	0	1	—	NABC (1998); N (1998); SN (1998); CBS (1998); ACC (1998)
17	Matt Doherty	2000–2003	96	53	43	.552	23	25	0.479	1	0	—	AP (2001)
18	Roy Williams^{†}	2003–2021	648	485	163	.748	212	94	0.693	9	3	3: 2005^{♠} 2009^{♠} 2017^{♠}	BHOF (2007); NCHOF (2006); AP (2006); USBWA (2006); ARC(2006) (Note: Roy Williams was also named College Coach of the Year in 1990 by the U.S. Basketball Writers Association, in 1992 by the Associated Press, in 1997 by Naismith, Sporting News, and was given the 2003 John Wooden Legends of Coaching Award which all occurred when he was the head coach of Kansas.); ACC (2006, 2011) (Note: Roy Williams was also named Big 8 or Big 12 Conference Coach of the Year in 1990, 1992, 1995, 1996, 1997, 2002, and 2003, which all occurred when he was the head coach of Kansas.)
19	Hubert Davis	2021–2026	179	125	54	.698	68	30	0.694	1	0	0	ACC (2024)
Totals			3302	2419	883	0.732	1087	437	0.713	42	26	6	
