= Monke =

Monke may refer to:

== People ==
=== Surname or alias ===
- Anja Monke (born 1977), German golfer
- John Monke (c. 1659–1701), British politician
- Monke, alias of Sir Thomas Monck (1570–1627), British politician

=== Fictional ===
- Roxy Monke, a character in The Power (Alderman novel)

== See also ==
- Monk (surname)
- Monk (disambiguation)
- Monkey (disambiguation)
