= Monks (surname) =

Monks is an English surname. Notable people with this name include:

- Clifford Monks (1912–1974), English cricketer
- Constance Monks (1911–1989), British politician and teacher
- Daniel Monks, Australian actor and screenwriter
- George Monks (cricketer) (born 1929), English cricketer
- George Howard Monks (1853–1933), American board game designer and surgeon
- Helen Monks, English actress and writer
- Jason Monks, American politician, Idaho State Representative since 2012
- John Monks (born 1945), British politician
- John Monks Jr. (1910–2004), American author, actor, playwright, screenwriter and director
- John Austin Sands Monks (1850–1917), American painter
- John Clark Monks (1760–1827), English sea captain also known as the Hanging Sailor of Perryman
- Joseph M. Monks (born 1968), American writer and film director
- Neale Monks (born 1971), British former palaeontologist
- Pete Monks (born 1986), English footballer
- Robert A. G. Monks (1933–2025), American shareholder activist and author
- Sarah P. Monks (1841–1926), American naturalist and poet
- Victoria Monks (1884–1927), British music hall singer

== See also ==
- Monk (surname)
