= Monks (disambiguation) =

Monks is the plural of monk, a religious ascetic.

Monks may also refer to:

== Places ==
- Monks Bay, Isle of Wight, England
- Monks Brook, Hampshire, England
- Monks Mound, the largest Pre-Columbian earthwork in America north of Mesoamerica
- Monks Wood, Cambridgeshire, England

== Other uses ==
- Monks (surname), a list of people
- The Monks, a 1960s rock band
- The Monks (UK band), a 1970s punk band
- Monks Investment Trust, incorporated in 1929 in Edinburgh, Scotland
- Monks (Oliver Twist), a character in Charles Dickens' novel Oliver Twist
- Monks (album), a 2019 album by Borah Bergman, Wilber Morris, and Sunny Murray
- Monks (media company), a marketing agency

== See also ==
- Monks Collection, a collection of material relating to South African stamps
- Monk (disambiguation)
