= Monk (nickname) =

As a nickname, Monk or The Monk may refer to:

== Sports ==
- Monk Cline (1858–1916), American baseball player
- Monk Dubiel (1918–1969), American baseball pitcher
- Mark "Monk" Hubbard (1970–2018), American skateboarder, skatepark builder, artist, and founder of Grindline Skateparks
- Antonin Magne (1904–1983), French cyclist who won the Tour de France in 1931 and 1934, nicknamed "The Monk"
- Monk McDonald (1901–1977), American college athlete, head basketball coach and urologist
- Jim "Monk" Moscrip (1913–1980), American gridiron football player
- Monk Sherlock (1904–1985), American baseball player
- Claude Simons Sr. (1887–1943), American sports coach at Tulane University
  - Claude Simons Jr. (1914–1975), American college athlete and football, basketball and baseball coach at Tulane University, known as "Little Monk"
- Monk Williams (1945–2003), American gridiron football player

== Other ==
- Monk Boudreaux (born 1941), American singer and R&B musician
- Monk Eastman (1875–1920), founder and leader of a powerful New York City gang
- Monk Higgins (1936–1986), American musician and saxophonist
- Gerry Hutch (born 1963), Irish bank robber known as "The Monk"
- Edward Malloy (born 1941), 16th president of the University of Notre Dame
- Monk Montgomery (1921–1982), American jazz bassist

== See also ==
- Monk (disambiguation)
- Monk (surname)
