= Monk (disambiguation) =

A monk is a person who practices a strict religious and ascetic lifestyle.

Monk may also refer to:

== People ==
- Monk (nickname)
- Monk (surname)
- Monk Gibbon (1896–1987), Irish poet and author

== Places ==
- Monk (Montreal Metro), a metro station in Montreal, Québec, Canada
- Monk Islands, South Orkney Islands, off Antarctica
- Monk's House, an 18th-century English cottage

== Arts and entertainment ==
=== Fictional characters ===
- Adrian Monk, the protagonist of the television series Monk
- William Monk (character), a Victorian-era detective
- Monk (comics), a vampire-werewolf hybrid and nemesis of Batman
- The Monk (Doctor Who), a recurring villain in the Doctor Who television series and related media
- Andrew Blodgett Mayfair ("Monk"), an adventurer associate of Doc Savage's
- the title character of Monk Little Dog, an animated series for children on CITV
- Monk (character class), a character class in a number of role-playing tabletop and video games
  - Monk (Dungeons & Dragons), a playable character in most versions of Dungeons & Dragons

=== Films ===
- The Monk (1969 film), a made-for-television movie
- The Monk (1972 film), a French-German-Italian-Belgian film
- The Monk (1975 film), a Hong Kong martial arts film
- The Monk (1980 film), a Hong Kong martial arts film
- The Monk (1990 film), a British film
- The Monk (2011 film), a French film
- The Monk (2015 film), a Chinese film

=== Music ===
- Monk (experimental music band), led by former Over the Rhine guitarist Ric Hordinski
- Monk (1954 album), by Thelonious Monk
- Monk (1964 album), by Thelonious Monk

=== Television ===
- Monk (TV series), a television show about an obsessive-compulsive detective
  - Monk (soundtrack), a 2004 soundtrack of the show

=== In print ===
- Monk Magazine, a magazine featuring the adventures of Jim Crotty and Michael Lane
- The Monk, a 1796 Gothic novel by Matthew Gregory Lewis

== Flora and fauna ==
- Amauris tartarea, a butterfly also known as the monk or dusky friar
- Monk parakeet (Myiopsitta monachus), a bird of South America
- Monk seal, any of several species of the tribe Monachini
- Siraitia grosvenorii, a vine which bears a fruit known as monk fruit

== Other uses ==
- Monk shoe, a men's shoe with a buckled strap

== See also ==
- Monck (disambiguation)
- Monks (disambiguation)
- Wilhelm Mohnke (1911–2001), SS major general, one of the original 120 members of the Nazi SS-Staff Guard "Berlin"
