= Fishburne Military School =

Private military school in Virginia, US

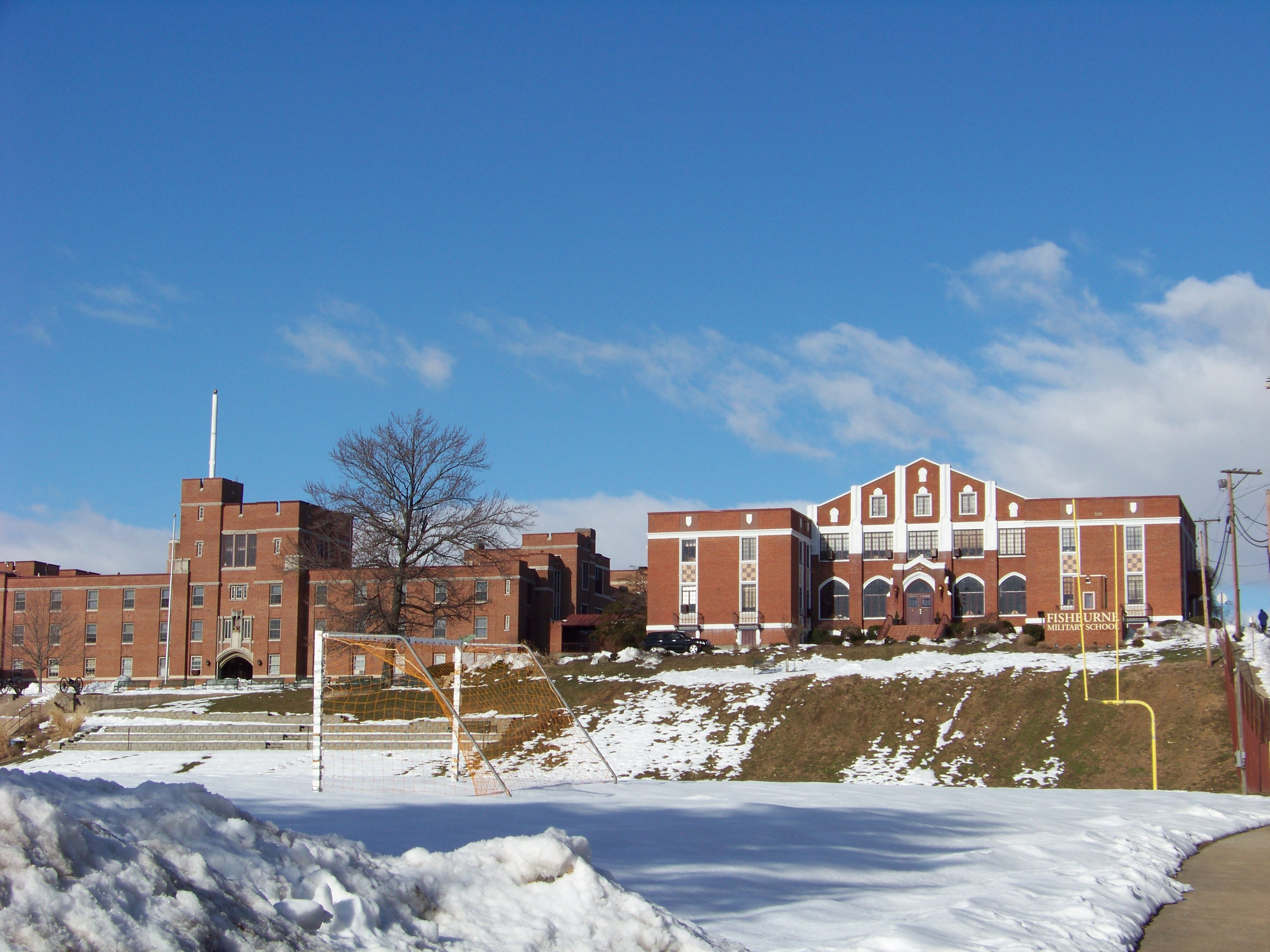

Location
- 255 South Wayne Avenue; Waynesboro, Virginia 22980; United States; 38°04′03″N 78°53′33″W

Information
- Other name: FMS
- Type: Private, military boarding school
- Motto: Latin: Scientia Est Potestas (Knowledge is Power)
- Established: 1879
- Founder: James A. Fishburne
- NCES School ID: 01433791
- President: Randal Brown
- Teaching staff: 19.8 (on an FTE basis)
- Grades: 8–12, postgraduate
- Gender: Boys
- Enrollment: 65 (2025-2026)
- Student to teacher ratio: 8.3
- Colors: Maroon and Gold
- Athletics conference: Virginia Independent Conference
- Mascot: Caisson
- Team name: Caissons
- Yearbook: Taps
- Affiliation: Junior Reserve Officers' Training Corps
- Website: www.fishburne.org
- Fishburne Military School
- U.S. National Register of Historic Places
- Virginia Landmarks Register
- Area: 9 acres (3.6 ha)
- Built: 1916
- Architect: T.J. Collins
- Architectural style: Gothic Revival
- NRHP reference No.: 84000058
- VLR No.: 136-0004

Significant dates
- Added to NRHP: October 4, 1984
- Designated VLR: August 21, 1984

Fishburne Military School (FMS) is a private, military boarding school for boys in Waynesboro, Virginia, United States. It was founded by James A. Fishburne in 1879 and is the oldest military high school in Virginia, and the 13th oldest in the Nation, still in operation today.

== History ==
James Abbott Fishburne, born in Waynesboro, Virginia, was an honor graduate of Washington College. He taught at Horner Military Academy, Abingdon Male Academy, and several other schools, and also attended Union Theological Seminary for one semester. Inspired by Robert E. Lee, he opened what eventually was to be called Fishburne Military School in 1879 with 24 students. It was accredited by the Southern Association of Colleges and Schools in 1897. Professor Fishburne died on November 11, 1921, his last remarks being about his "boys"

The first section of the wooden barracks (now called the front parapet) was built in 1883. Staunton architects T.J. Collins & Sons designed the 1916-22 barracks complex, the 1915 library (Virginia's second Carnegie library), and the 1940 gymnasium/administrative building.

Colonel Morgan H. Hudgins, the school's second great leader, began teaching in 1901 and served as Principal/Superintendent from 1912 to 1952. In February 1919, the school adopted one of the nation's first Army Junior Reserve Officer Training Corps programs.

The Fishburne-Hudgins Educational Foundation, named for the school's two early leaders, was organized by alumni in 1951 to acquire and perpetuate the school. The Foundation's Board of Trustees continues to oversee the operation of the school.

== Campus ==
The 1916 Gothic Revival barracks was added to the National Register of Historic Places on October 4, 1984 (Ref# 84000058). It is the center of the Fishburne campus and dominates downtown Waynesboro as it sits on a hill overlooking the school's parade and athletic field. The barracks building is constructed in the form of an open, three-floor rectangle with cadet rooms, some offices, and classrooms facing the open Quadrangle. Attached to the barracks is a wing containing the chapel above the mess hall which is above the swimming pool.

Attached to the barracks by a breezeway is the administrative/gymnasium building. The most recently occupied campus building, sitting on the southeast corner, is Hobby-Hudgins Hall, combining a modern computer center and library with physical education facilities including locker rooms and weight room.

Hitt-Millar Fieldhouse, the 23,000-square-foot, $4.5 million building built in 2019, is the new home of the school's physical-conditioning program, with a full basketball court, weight-training facilities, coaches’ offices, a fully equipped trainers' room and a multi-purpose conference area.

The project was made possible through generous donations from the Hitt and Millar families. Russell Hitt, FMS Class of 1953, a long-time supporter of Fishburne Military School, joined with his daughter, Tracey Hitt Millar, and her husband, Jim Millar, to provide the $4.5 million donation to fund construction.

== Notable alumni ==
- Gerald L. Baliles, 1959, Governor of Virginia
- John Campbell, bassist of heavy metal band Lamb of God
- Reno Collier, stand-up comedian
- ED Denson, music group manager, producer, record label owner
- Daniel Dixon, 2013, professional basketball player
- Jonathan Edwards, singer and songwriter
- Otto Felix, 1962, actor, writer
- Samuel Lightfoot Flournoy, lawyer and politician
- Leonel Gómez Vides, Salvadoran activist
- John L. Hanigan, businessman
- Monk McDonald, college athlete, a head coach for the North Carolina Tar Heels men's basketball team
- Vince McMahon, 1964, WWE (formerly WWF) chairman and founder of the XFL
- John O. Noonan, 1999, conservative policy advisor and writer for The Weekly Standard
- Bill Palmer (1938–2020), swim coach
- John J. Rowlands, journalist, writer, and outdoorsman
- W. Richard Stevens, technical author

== Notable faculty ==
- John W. Fishburne, Virginia Congressman
- Joel Greenspoon, psychology researcher, professor, and clinician

== See also ==
- Association of Military Colleges and Schools of the United States
- List of boarding schools in the United States
- List of high schools in Virginia
- Virginia Association of Independent Schools
