= George Monks =

George Monks is the name of:

- George Monks (cricketer) (1929–2011), English cricketer
- George Howard Monks (1853–1933), American surgeon
- George W. Monks, who served in the Indiana General Assembly in 1855

== See also ==
- George Monk (disambiguation)
