= John Monks (disambiguation) =

John Monks is a former General Secretary of the Trades Union Congress (TUC) in the UK.

John Monks may also refer to:

- John Monks Jr. (1910–2004), American author, actor, and Marine
- John Austin Sands Monks (1850–1917), American painter
- John Clark Monks (1760–1827), also known as the Hanging Sailor of Perryman, sea captain

== See also ==
- John Monk (disambiguation)
