= Monck =

Monck may refer to:

== People ==
- Monck (surname)

== Other uses ==
- Monck (electoral district), a historic electoral district in Canada
- Monck Provincial Park, British Columbia, Canada
- HMS Monck, British Royal Navy ship or shore establishment
- Viscount Monck, a title in the Peerage of Ireland

== See also ==
- Moncks Corner, South Carolina
- Monck Mason (disambiguation)
- Monk (disambiguation)
