= List of Virginia Tech Hokies men's basketball seasons =

This is a list of seasons completed by the Virginia Tech Hokies men's college basketball team.

== Seasons ==
Record table
Season	Coach	Overall	Conference	Standing	Postseason
R.M. Brown (Independent) (1908–1909)
1908–09	R.M. Brown	4–2			
R.M. Brown:		4–2 (.667)			
Branch Bocock (Independent) (1909–1911)
1909–10	Branch Bocock	11–0			
1910–11	Branch Bocock	11–1			
Branch Bocock:		22–1 (.957)			
L.N. Keesling (Independent) (1911–1912)
1911–12	L.N. Keesling	6–3			
L.N. Keesling:		6–3 (.667)			
Branch Bocock (Independent) (1913–1916)
1913–14	Branch Bocock	14–5			
1914–15	Branch Bocock	9–4			
1915–16	Branch Bocock	12–3			
Branch Bocock:		57–13 (.814)			
Harlan Sanborn (Independent) (1916–1917)
1916–17	Harlan Sanborn	17–2			
Harlan Sanborn:		17–2 (.895)			
Charles Bernier (Independent) (1917–1920)
1917–18	Charles Bernier	15–5			
1918–19	Charles Bernier	18–4			
1919–20	Charles Bernier	14–4			
Charles Bernier:		47–13 (.783)			
Monk Younger (Independent) (1920–1921)
1920–21	Monk Younger	19–5			
Monk Younger (Southern Conference) (1921–1923)
1921–22	Monk Younger	14–6	2–2	8th	
1922–23	Monk Younger	13–6	1–2	T–13th	
Monk Younger:		46–17 (.730)	3–4 (.429)		
B.C. Cubbage (Southern Conference) (1923–1924)
1923–24	B.C. Cubbage	5–13	0–4	18th	
B.C. Cubbage:		5–13 (.278)	0–4 (.000)		
Buford Blair (Southern Conference) (1924–1926)
1924–25	Buford Blair	6–9	1–4	T–14th	
1925–26	Buford Blair	3–10	2–5	15th	
Buford Blair:		9–19 (.321)	3–9 (.250)		
Puss Redd (Southern Conference) (1926–1927)
1926–27	Puss Redd	6–8	2–6	17th	
Puss Redd:		6–8 (.429)	2–6 (.250)		
Bud Moore (Southern Conference) (1927–1928)
1927–28	Bud Moore	5–11	3–7	T–16th	
Bud Moore:		5–11 (.313)	3–7 (.300)		
Red Randall (Southern Conference) (1928–1929)
1928–29	Red Randall	4–13	5–7	13th	
Red Randall:		4–13 (.235)	5–7 (.417)		
Robert Warren (Southern Conference) (1929–1930)
1929–30	Robert Warren	5–14	2–10	20th	
Robert Warren:		5–14 (.263)	2–10 (.167)		
Charles Rhodes (Southern Conference) (1930–1931)
1930–31	Charles Rhodes	5–10	3–7	19th	
Charles Rhodes:		5–10 (.333)	3–7 (.300)		
George S. Gummy Proctor (Southern Conference) (1931–1932)
1931–32	George S. Gummy Proctor	8–9	2–8	20th	
Monk Younger (Southern Conference) (1932–1937)
1932–33	Monk Younger	5–10	3–7	7th	
1933–34	Monk Younger	1–15	1–10	9th	
1934–35	Monk Younger	3–16	1–11	10th	
1935–36	Monk Younger	5–16	1–9	9th	
1936–37	Monk Younger	6–11	4–9	12th	
Monk Younger:		20–68 (.227)	10–56 (.152)		
Mac McEver (Southern Conference) (1937–1944)
1937–38	Mac McEver	6–8	4–5	10th	
1938–39	Mac McEver	3–14	2–10	14th	
1939–40	Mac McEver	4–15	1–9	15th	
1940–41	Mac McEver	8–13	4–8	12th	
1941–42	Mac McEver	10–10	4–8	T–10th	
1942–43	Mac McEver	7–7	3–6	12th	
1943–44	Mac McEver	11–4	4–1	2nd	
Mac McEver:		49–71 (.408)	22–47 (.319)		
George S. Gummy Proctor (Southern Conference) (1944–1947)
1944–45	George S. Gummy Proctor	6–8	1–3	10th	
1945–46	George S. Gummy Proctor	11–8	7–3	3rd	
1946–47	George S. Gummy Proctor	13–13	4–9	13th	
George S. Gummy Proctor:		38–38 (.500)	14–23 (.378)		
Red Laird (Southern Conference) (1947–1955)
1947–48	Red Laird	14–9	7–5	6th	
1948–49	Red Laird	10–13	6–8	9th	
1949–50	Red Laird	16–9	9–5	6th	
1950–51	Red Laird	19–10	9–5	6th	
1951–52	Red Laird	4–16	3–10	12th	
1952–53	Red Laird	4–19	4–13	13th	
1953–54	Red Laird	3–24	3–13	9th	
1954–55	Red Laird	7–20	4–14	9th	
Red Laird:		77–120 (.391)	45–73 (.381)		
Chuck Noe (Southern Conference) (1955–1960)
1955–56	Chuck Noe	14–11	10–7	3rd	
1956–57	Chuck Noe	14–8	12–5	3rd	
1957–58	Chuck Noe	11–8	10–5	2nd	
1958–59	Chuck Noe	16–5	10–2	2nd	
1959–60	Chuck Noe	20–6	12–1	1st	
1960–61	Chuck Noe	15–7	12–3	2nd	
1961–62	Chuck Noe	19–6	9–3	2nd	
Chuck Noe:		109–51 (.681)	75–26 (.743)		
William Matthews (Southern Conference) (1962–1963)
1962–63	William Matthews	12–12	6–6	T–5th	
1963–64	William Matthews	16–7	7–3	3rd	
Williams Matthews:		28–19 (.596)	13–9 (.591)		
Howie Shannon (Southern Conference) (1964–1965)
1964–65	Howie Shannon	13–10	9–5	2nd	
Howie Shannon (Independent) (1965–1971)
1965–66	Howie Shannon	19–5			NIT first round
1966–67	Howie Shannon	20–7			NCAA University Division Elite Eight
1967–68	Howie Shannon	14–11			
1968–69	Howie Shannon	14–12			
1969–70	Howie Shannon	10–12			
1970–71	Howie Shannon	14–11			
Howie Shannon:		104–68 (.605)	9–5 (.643)		
Don DeVoe (Independent) (1971–1976)
1971–72	Don DeVoe	16–10			
1972–73	Don DeVoe	22–5			NIT Champion
1973–74	Don DeVoe	13–13			
1974–75	Don DeVoe	16–10			
1975–76	Don DeVoe	21–7			NCAA Division I first round
Don DeVoe:		88–45 (.662)			
Charles Moir (Independent) (1976–1977)
1976–77	Charles Moir	19–10			NIT second round
1977–78	Charles Moir	19–8			
Charles Moir (Metro Conference) (1978–1987)
1978–79	Charles Moir	22–9	4–6	T–4th	NCAA Division I second round
1979–80	Charles Moir	21–8	8–4	2nd	NCAA Division I second round
1980–81	Charles Moir	15–13	6–6	T–3rd	
1981–82	Charles Moir	20–11	7–5	4th	NIT quarterfinal
1982–83	Charles Moir	23–11	7–5	T–2nd	NIT second round
1983–84	Charles Moir	22–13	8–6	4th	NIT Third Place
1984–85	Charles Moir	20–9	10–4	2nd	NCAA Division I first round
1985–86	Charles Moir	22–9	7–5	3rd	NCAA Division I first round
1986–87	Charles Moir	10–18	5–7	T–5th	
Charles Moir:		213–119 (.642)	62–48 (.564)		
Frankie Allen (Metro Conference) (1987–1991)
1987–88	Frankie Allen	19–10	6–6	T–3rd	
1988–89	Frankie Allen	11–17	2–10	T–6th	
1989–90	Frankie Allen	13–18	5–9	7th	
1990–91	Frankie Allen	13–16	6–8	6th	
Frankie Allen:		56–61 (.479)	19–33 (.365)		
Bill C. Foster (Metro Conference) (1991–1995)
1991–92	Bill C. Foster	10–18	3–9	7th	
1992–93	Bill C. Foster	10–18	1–11	7th	
1993–94	Bill C. Foster	18–10	6–6	4th	
1994–95	Bill C. Foster	25–10	6–6	T–4th	NIT Champion
Bill C. Foster (Atlantic 10 Conference) (1995–1997)
1995–96	Bill C. Foster	23–6	13–3	T–1st (West)	NCAA Division I second round
1996–97	Bill C. Foster	15–16	7–9	3rd (West)	
Bill C. Foster:		101–78 (.564)	36–44 (.450)		
Bobby Hussey (Atlantic 10 Conference) (1997–1999)
1997–98	Bobby Hussey	10–17	5–11	T–4th (West)	
1998–99	Bobby Hussey	13–15	7–9	4th (West)	
Bobby Hussey:		23–32 (.418)	12–20 (.375)		
Ricky Stokes (Atlantic 10 Conference) (1999–2000)
1999–00	Ricky Stokes	16–15	8–8	4th (West)	
Ricky Stokes (Big East Conference) (2000–2003)
2000–01	Ricky Stokes	8–19	2–14	7th (East)	
2001–02	Ricky Stokes	10–18	4–12	7th (East)	
2002–03	Ricky Stokes	11–18	4–12	7th (East)	
Ricky Stokes:		45–70 (.391)	18–46 (.281)		
Seth Greenberg (Big East Conference) (2003–2004)
2003–04	Seth Greenberg	15–14	7–9	8th	
Seth Greenberg (Atlantic Coast Conference) (2004–2012)
2004–05	Seth Greenberg	16–14	8–8	4th	NIT second round
2005–2006	Seth Greenberg	14–16	4–12	7th	
2006–07	Seth Greenberg	22–12	10–6	3rd	NCAA Division I second round
2007–08	Seth Greenberg	21–14	9–7	4th	NIT quarterfinal
2008–09	Seth Greenberg	19–15	7–9	8th	NIT second round
2009–10	Seth Greenberg	25–9	10–6	4th	NIT quarterfinal
2010–11	Seth Greenberg	22–12	9–7	T–4th	NIT second round
2011–12	Seth Greenberg	16–17	4–12	T–9th	
Seth Greenberg:		170–123 (.580)	68–76 (.472)		
James Johnson (Atlantic Coast Conference) (2012–2014)
2012–13	James Johnson	13–19	4–14	12th	
2013–14	James Johnson	9–22	2–16	15th	
James Johnson:		22–41 (.349)	6–30 (.167)		
Buzz Williams (Atlantic Coast Conference) (2014–2019)
2014–15	Buzz Williams	11–22	2–16	15th	
2015–16	Buzz Williams	20–15	10–8	T–7th	NIT second round
2016–17	Buzz Williams	22–11	10–8	T–7th	NCAA Division I first round
2017–18	Buzz Williams	21–12	10–8	7th	NCAA Division I first round
2018–19	Buzz Williams	26–9	12–6	5th	NCAA Division I Sweet Sixteen
Buzz Williams:		100–69 (.592)	44–46 (.489)		
Mike Young (Atlantic Coast Conference) (2019–Present)
2019–20	Mike Young	16–16	7–13	T–9th	No postseason held
2020–21	Mike Young	15–7	9–4	3rd	NCAA Division I first round
2021–22	Mike Young	23–13	11–9	7th	NCAA Division I first round
2022–23	Mike Young	19–15	8–12	11th	NIT first round
2023–24	Mike Young	19–15	10–10	T–8th	NIT second round
2024–25	Mike Young	13–19	8–12	T–9th	
2025–26	Mike Young	19–13	8–10	T–11th	
Mike Young:		124–98 (.559)	61–70 (.466)		
Total:		1,590–1,306 (.549)			
National champion Postseason invitational champion Conference regular season champion Conference regular season and conference tournament champion Division regular season champion Division regular season and conference tournament champion Conference tournament champion
