= George Monk =

George Monk may refer to:

- George Monck, 1st Duke of Albemarle (1608–1670), English soldier and sailor
- George William Monk (1838–1917), Canadian politician

== See also ==
- George Monks (disambiguation)
