= John Monk =

John Monk may refer to:

- Jack Monk, fictional character in Monk
- John Monke, English politician, MP for New Shoreham

== See also ==
- John Monks (disambiguation)
