= Monk (surname) =

Monk is an English surname.

Notable people with the surname:

- Monk (Berkshire cricketer), English professional cricketer in the 1790s
- Allan Monk (born 1942), Canadian baritone
- Art Monk (born 1957), American football player
- Bradley J. Monk, American gynecologic oncologist
- Cyril Monk (1882–1970), Australian violinist
- Cyrus Monk (born 1996), Australian cyclist
- Dave Monk (1952 or 1953–2025), British television and radio broadcaster
- Debra Monk (born 1949), American actress, singer, and writer
- Elizabeth Monk (1898–1980), Canadian lawyer and city councillor
- Frank Monk (1886–1962), English footballer
- Frederick Debartzch Monk (1856–1914), Canadian lawyer and politician
- Garry Monk (born 1979), English footballer
- George William Monk (1838–1917), Canadian politician
- Geraldine Monk (born 1952), British poet
- Hank Monk (1826–1883), American stagecoach driver
- Henry Wentworth Monk (1827–1896), Canadian millenarian prophet and early Zionist
- Ian Monk (1960–2025), British writer and translator
- Jacob Monk (born 2001), American football player
- James Henry Monk (1784–1856), English divine and classical scholar
- Karyn Monk (born 1960), Canadian historical romance novelist
- Laura Monk, French mathematician
- Lorraine Monk (1922–2020), Canadian photographer
- Malik Monk (born 1998), American basketball player
- Marcus Monk (born 1986), NFL football player; brother of Malik
- Maria Monk (1816–1849), supposed author of The Hidden Secrets of a Nun's Life in a Convent Exposed
- Meredith Monk (born 1942), American composer, performer, director, vocalist, film-maker, and choreographer
- Nicholas Monck (1610–1661), Bishop of Hereford and Provost of Eton College
- Nicholas A. M. Monk, British mathematician
- Nicholas Monk (literary critic), British literary critic
- Nick Monk, a member of Spiders (British band)
- Quincy Monk (1979–2015), was an American football linebacker
- Ray Monk (born 1957), professor of philosophy at the University of Southampton
- Robert W. Monk (1866–1924), American physician and politician
- Scott Monk (born 1974), Australian author
- Sophie Monk (born 1979), Australian pop singer, actress and occasional model
- T. S. Monk (born 1949), American jazz drummer, composer and bandleader, son of Thelonious Monk
- Thelonious Monk (1917–1982), American jazz pianist and composer
- Wendy Monk (1915–2000), English author
- William Monk (disambiguation), multiple people

== See also ==
- Monks (surname), people with this surname
