= Jonathan Overend =

English radio journalist

Jonathan Overend is an English presenter, commentator and reporter working for ITV Sport, BBC Sport, Times Radio, ATP Media and Premier League Productions. He also runs his own production company, NinetyFour19 Ltd.

Overend began his radio career as a volunteer at Hospital Radio Chelmsford. He joined BBC Essex in 1989, while still studying for his A levels. After studying journalism Overend became the UK's youngest full-time sports producer in 1994, at the age of 21. He then became a co-presenter of the BBC Essex Drivetime show.

In 1997 he joined BBC Sport to work on BBC Radio 5 Live as a reporter. He took over as the station's main tennis reporter in 2002 from Iain Carter and became correspondent a year later. In an 11-year tenure, he commentated on over 50 tennis tournaments, covering all of Roger Federer's Grand Slam titles, and Andy Murray's career from junior to world No.3. After the 2013 Wimbledon Championships, Overend accepted a new position as a presenter of 5 Live Sport, as well as reporting and commentating on football.

He was the second lead presenter for 5 Live at the 2014 FIFA World Cup and was the main host for the network at the 2016 Paralympic Games. He reported from the 2017/2018 Ashes Tour and, in 2019, ended a five-year tenure as anchor of the Sunday afternoon Premier League programme.

In 2020, after a brief spell working for BBC Sounds on an Education podcast, part of the BBC's lockdown offering to parents and schoolchildren, it was announced Overend was leaving the BBC staff to go freelance. In September 2020, he joined the commentary team for ITV on the French Open tennis.

In January 2021, Overend was the host and producer of the documentary podcast series "Emergency on Planet Sport" which explored the little-discussed topic of sport and climate change. The programmes led to wider media coverage of the topic on both BBC and Sky.

Overend won the 2010 Sports Journalists' Association Sports Broadcaster of the Year award.

He is 6 feet 4 inches (1.93 m) tall and has two children.
