= BBC Essex =

BBC Local Radio service for Essex, England

Coordinates: 51.7253°N 0.4615°E

- Chelmsford; England
- Broadcast area: Essex
- Frequencies: FM: 95.3 MHz (Basildon and Southend-on-Sea); FM: 103.5 MHz (Clacton-on-Sea, Frinton-on-Sea, Chelmsford, Walton, Harwich, Dovercourt, Colchester, Saffron Walden and Braintree); DAB: 12D; Freeview: 716
- RDS: BBCESSEX

Programming
- Language: English
- Format: Local news, talk and music

Ownership
- Owner: BBC Local Radio, BBC East, BBC London

History
- First air date: 5 November 1986
- Former frequencies: 729 MW; 765 MW; 1530 MW

Technical information
- Licensing authority: Ofcom

Links
- Website: BBC Essex

BBC Essex is the BBC's local radio station serving the county of Essex.

It broadcasts on FM, DAB, digital TV and via BBC Sounds from studios on New London Road in Chelmsford.

According to the Radio Joint Audience Research, the station has a weekly audience of 136,000 listeners as of May 2025.

== History ==
BBC Essex launched on 5 November 1986. It broke from the naming convention of "BBC Radio (county name)" so as to avoid confusion with Essex Radio (later Essex FM, now Heart Essex). There was also a pirate station called Radio Essex in the 1960s, and currently, there is an independent commercial station called Radio Essex.

BBC Essex set out to be different from existing BBC local stations, which were often perceived as rather "stuffy" and "worthy". It launched with a more upbeat sound, an almost "tabloid" news style and younger presenters than most stations; the BBC Essex symbol also did not feature the traditional BBC logo. However, in more recent years, the style has been toned down and the format is now more in line with the rest of the BBC local radio network.

The station has also employed a number of high-profile presenters including Alex Lester, James Whale, Jonathan Overend (BBC Radio 5 Live), Tim 'Timbo' Lloyd (twice winner of Best Local DJ at the Sony Radio Awards), Mark Pougatch (ITV Sport), Dermot O'Leary (National radio & TV presenter) and music promoter Eric 'Monster' Hall.

A revised programme schedule at the station was launched in September 2015 following the appointment of Louise Birt as Managing Editor in April 2015, following the departure of predecessor Gerald Main, who held the role from 2007 until February 2015.

== Technical ==
The strongest signal is 103.5 FM, which comes from the Great Braxted transmitter between Witham and Tiptree. It also transmits the Essex DAB mux. The 95.3 FM signal from South Benfleet is heard in most of the southern Thames Estuary.

There are no longer any AM transmitters broadcasting BBC Essex, the last two being closed in May 2021. The 500 ft Manningtree tower, which formerly transmitted BBC Essex on 729 kHz, also has Essex DAB.

The Bakers Wood (Chelmsford) transmitter, which formerly transmitted BBC Essex on 765 kHz, is another of the DAB transmitters. Local DAB signals, since 20 May 2002, are the Essex 12D multiplex, which has further transmitters at Maitland House (Southend-on-Sea town centre), Colchester, Sudbury (in Suffolk), and Rye Hill (south of Harlow - on a water tower). BBC Essex also used to transmit on 1530 kHz from Rayleigh (Southend) until it ceased broadcasting in January 2018 as a cost saving measure.

The station also broadcasts on Freeview TV channel 716 across the BBC East, BBC London and BBC South East regions and streams online via BBC Sounds.

== Pirate BBC Essex ==
From 10 to 17 April 2004, BBC Essex marked the fortieth anniversary of offshore radio in Britain by launching their own ship-based radio station, Pirate BBC Essex. Broadcasting from an old light vessel, the station transmitted sixties music and memories twenty-four hours a day all week. This was followed in August 2007 by another broadcast marking the anniversary of the closing of the pirate stations by the Marine Broadcasting Offences Act 1967.

Over the Easter Weekend in April 2009, the popular Pirate Radio Essex programme was resurrected by popular demand from listeners, occurring five days after the release of the comedy movie The Boat that Rocked. This was broadcast on the AM frequencies, as well as on the Internet, which resulted in many calls from as far away as New Zealand. Presenters included Johnnie Walker, Tony Blackburn, Dave Cash and Keith Skues as well as three of the station's presenters: Steve Scruton; Ian Wyatt & Ray Clark.

BBC Essex presenter Ray Clark authored a book called 'Radio Caroline: The True Story of The Boat That Rocked' which was published in early 2014. Clark retired from BBC Essex on 20 June 2014 after leaving his award-winning breakfast show in February that year. Clark returned to BBC Essex in September 2015 to present a new, regular, Saturday morning show.

Pirate BBC Essex took to the airwaves for one final time on 13 and 14 August 2017. Starting at 10 pm on 13 August 2017 Keith Skues presented his regular, 3-hour regional Sunday night show from the LV18 studio, and on 14 August 2017 programmes were broadcast commencing at 9 am, with the eventual closure at 3 pm, marking the 50th anniversary of the Marine Offences Act which closed most pirate radio stations. Guest presenters included Johnnie Walker, Roger 'Twiggy' Day, Tom Edwards and Norman St John.

== Programming ==
Local programming is produced and broadcast from the BBC's Chelmsford studios from 6 am to 6 pm on Mondays to Fridays, 10am to 2pm at weekends and for sports coverage.

Off-peak programming, including the late show from 10 pm to 1 am, originates from London or Manchester.

During the station's downtime, BBC Essex simulcasts overnight programming from BBC Radio 5 Live.

== Presenters ==
=== Notable presenters ===
- Liana Bridges (Sundays 10 am to 2 pm, co-presenter of the Essex Quest)
- Dave Monk (died 2025)
