= William Monk =

William Monk may refer to:

- William Monk (artist, born 1863) (1863–1937), British artist
- William Monk (artist, born 1977), British contemporary artist
- William Henry Monk (1823–1889), English organist
- William Monk, a character created by novelist Anne Perry
- Billy Monk (died 1982), South African photographer
