= Bo Shepard =

American basketball coach

- Shepard pictured in Yackety yak 1936, UNC yearbook

Biographical details
- Born: September 18, 1904; Florence, South Carolina, U.S.
- Died: May 8, 1983 (aged 78); Chapel Hill, North Carolina, U.S.

Playing career
- ?: Army

Coaching career (HC unless noted)
- 1931–1935: North Carolina

Head coaching record
- Overall: 69–16

Accomplishments and honors

Championships
- SoCon regular season (1935); SoCon tournament (1935)

George Edward "Bo" Shepard (September 18, 1904 – May 8, 1983) was an American basketball coach. he served as the head coach of the North Carolina Tar Heels men's basketball team from 1931 to 1935.

== Early life and family ==
Shepard was the seventh child of Alexander Hurlbutt Shepard and Mary Augusta Westbrook. He attended New Hanover High School in Wilmington, North Carolina.

Shepard's family had various ties to athletics at North Carolina. His brother, Norman Shepard, became the head coach for North Carolina before Bo, and two of his other brothers, Carlyle Shepard and Alex Shepard, played basketball for North Carolina. Bo and Norman Shepard are the only pair of siblings to have ever coached the North Carolina men's basketball team.

== North Carolina ==
In 1929, Shepard joined the University of North Carolina's athletic faculty as an assistant graduate manager of athletics.

In 1932, James N. Ashmore departed as the head coach of the North Carolina men's basketball team, and Shepard took over as the new head coach.

In his first regular season, Shepard's North Carolina team was fairly successful winning 13 of 17 games and 6 out of 9 games in conference. In the 1933 Southern Conference tournament, Shepard's North Carolina team managed to make it past Tennessee in the first round and beat the Kentucky in the second round, which was coached by Adolph Rupp in his second season. North Carolina beat Auburn to go to the finals of the Southern Conference championship where they lost a close game 24–26 to Georgia.

At the end of the 1932–33 season, 13 schools left the Southern Conference to create the Southeastern Conference, which greatly changed the playing schedule and the usual opponents for North Carolina.

"There was no such thing as athletic scholarships or grants-in-aid in my day. In fact players had to sign a paper swearing that they hadn't received any aid for athletics from the University of North Carolina or any school in the conference. So what you had to do, you had to set your sights on several boys that you wanted to work on, and you had to go out and get jobs for them. There was no cash involved, and that was legitimate aid because it had to go through what was called a Self-Help Committee. So the boys actually worked for what they got."
- Bo Shepard

Going into the 1933–34 season, Shepard managed to recruit Ivan "Jack" Glace, who would go on to be the first of several prize recruits for Shepard. Glace was originally not much of a basketball player. "[Glace] was so awkward that he could hardly walk without tripping over his feet, but he wanted to play so badly he didn't know what to do," said Shepard. Shepard worked with Glace throughout his college years and eventually he would become all-conference in his senior year, which Shepard considered one of his major accomplishments.

During the 1933–34 season, the Tar Heels went 11–4 in the regular season. In the 1934 Southern Conference tournament, the Tar Heels won their first game against Virginia Tech, but lost in double overtime to South Carolina in the next round.

The 1934–35 season saw an increase in the North Carolina Tar Heels as they managed to go 17–3 and tied for second with the best regular season record. This squad was helped out by a pair of siblings, Dave and Jim McCrachren that both played on the team. In the 1935 Southern Conference tournament, the Tar Heels managed to beat Virginia in the first round but lost the Duke in the second round.

Shepard's last season, 1935–36, would be his best. The Tar Heels only lost two games during the regular season and won the regular season championship for the first time in nine years. In the 1936 Southern Conference Championship, the Tar Heels beat South Carolina, NC State, and Washington and Lee to win its fifth Southern Conference Championship.

Shepard has stated that in general his teams focused disproportionally on defense. Shepard stated that his teams "were never blown out badly. If you scored in the high 30s, you had a real good night in those days. Our goal was to keep the other team from scoring 20 points."

Though only winning the regular season and conference title once, Shepard's was greatly successful as a basketball coach finishing 69–16 overall and with the third best overall winning percentage of any North Carolina men's basketball coach with a winning percentage of .812.

== After coaching ==
Even though he was successful at coaching at UNC, Shepard had to step down as head coach due to health problems, and let Walter Skidmore take over as head coach. Even though he was no longer the head coach of the Tar Heels, Shepard would continue to work for the University of North Carolina until 1970.

Shepard went on to be president and vice president of the American Association of Health, Physical Education and Recreation. He also served as president of the College of Physical Education Association and Phi Delta Kappa, a professional education fraternity. Shepard also wrote the textbook Interscholastic Athletics. Shepard died on May 8, 1983.

== Head coaching record ==
Record table
Season	Team	Overall	Conference	Standing	Postseason
North Carolina Tar Heels (Southern Conference) (1931–1935)
1931–32	North Carolina	16–5	6–3	T–5th	
1932–33	North Carolina	12–5	5–3	T–5th	
1933–34	North Carolina	18–4	12–2	T–2nd	
1934–35	North Carolina	23–2	12–1	1st	
North Carolina:		69–16	35–9		
Total:		69–16			
National champion Postseason invitational champion Conference regular season champion Conference regular season and conference tournament champion Division regular season champion Division regular season and conference tournament champion Conference tournament champion
