= John L. Hanigan =

American businessman (1911–1996)

- Born: 1911; New York City, U.S.
- Died: July 1, 1996 (aged 84); West Palm Beach, Florida, U.S.
- Education: Fishburne Military School
- Alma mater: Stevens Institute of Technology
- Occupation: Businessman
- Spouse: Elsa Stelter
- Children: 2

John L. Hanigan (1911 – July 1, 1996) was an American businessman. He was the president and chief executive officer and chairman of the Brunswick Corporation in the 1960s and 1970s, and the chief executive officer and chairman of Genesco in the 1970s and 1980s. In 1978, Hanigan sold Manhattan's Bonwit Teller building to Donald Trump, who demolished it and replaced it with Trump Tower.

== Early life ==
John L. Hanigan was born circa 1911 in The Bronx, New York City. He was educated at the Fishburne Military School. He graduated from the Stevens Institute of Technology, and he attended the six-week Advanced Management Program at the Harvard Business School.

== Business career ==
Hanigan worked for Corning Inc. for 25 years. He was the executive vice president of Dow Corning for nearly two years in the early 1960s.

Hanigan was appointed as the president of the Brunswick Corporation in 1963. He later became its chief executive officer, and chairman in 1971. He was its president and chairman until 1976, and a director until 1983. According to the Chicago Tribune, "Under Mr. Hanigan's direction, heads of each Brunswick division were given major responsibilities to develop strategies and tactics that would earn the kind of return that shareholders would consider worthwhile."

Hanigan served as the chief executive officer of Genesco from 1977 to 1981, and as its chairman from 1977 to 1984. During his tenure, he turned the company around, by "writing off or selling affiliates not related to Genesco's main business of manufacturing and selling shoes." In 1978, Hanigan sold the Bonwit Teller building in Manhattan, owned by Genesco, to Donald Trump for $25 million; Trump demolished the building and built Trump Tower in its place. Hanigan was succeeded by Richard W. Hanselman.

Hanigan served on several corporate boards like Martin Marietta, Allis-Chalmers, Zenith Radio and the First American National Corporation. He was also a member of the President's Export Council.

== Civic activities ==
Hanigan served on the board of visitors of Georgetown University's School of Foreign Service. He also "donated $1.3 million to Vanderbilt University to establish a chair in pulmonary medicine" in 1982. He joined the President's Council of the American Lung Association in 1984.

== Personal life and death ==
Hanigan married Elsa Stelter. They had a son and a daughter. Hanigan's wife predeceased him in 1980, and he resided in North Palm Beach, Florida. He was a member of the Everglades Club in Palm Beach, Chicago Club and the New York Athletic Club.

Hanigan died of Alzheimer's disease on July 1, 1996, in West Palm Beach, Florida, at age 84.
