= Harlan Sanborn =

American basketball coach (1889–1948)

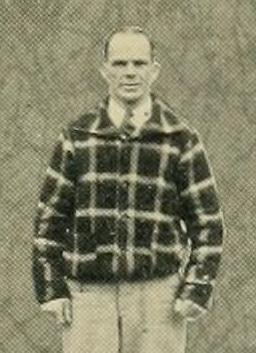

Biographical details
- Born: November 11, 1889
- Died: September 2, 1948 (aged 58)
- Education: Dartmouth College

Coaching career (HC unless noted)
- 1916–1917: Virginia Tech
- 1925–1926: North Carolina

Head coaching record
- Overall: 37–7

Accomplishments and honors

Championships
- 1 Southern Conference regular season (1926); 1 Southern Conference Tournament (1926)

Harlan Page Sanborn (1889-1948) was best known for being the head coach of the Virginia Tech Hokies men's basketball team and the North Carolina Tar Heels men's basketball team.

== Coaching at Virginia Tech ==
Sanborn was the head coach of Virginia Tech men's basketball during the 1916–17 basketball season. As head coach of the Hokies, Sanborn led the team to a record of 17–2. Sanborn's .895 winning percentage is the second highest of any Virginia Tech men's basketball head coach. Sanborn left as head coach after coaching only one season for Virginia Tech, one in which the final Premo-Porretta Power Poll listed the Hokies at #21.

== Coaching at North Carolina ==
After Monk McDonald left as the North Carolina head coach, Sanborn became the head coach of the North Carolina Tar Heels. Sanborn would inherit a strong North Carolina team, with Jack Cobb, who would later be named to the All-American team and would later have his number retired at North Carolina, Bill Dodderer, and Sam McDonald. These players had earned the nickname for the Tar Heels as the "White Phantoms" because of their fast playmaking and defense. Sanborn's team was very successful going undefeated at home playing in the Tin Can.

In one of the more memorable games during Sanborn's time as head coach, the Tar Heels played NC State Wolfpack team that planned to slow down the game in order to counter the Tar Heels fast offense. Because there was no shot clock in college basketball at this time, the team on offense could hold the ball as long as they wanted without taking a shot. In the end, the Wolfpack was able to maintain control of the ball and North Carolina lost the game with a final score of 17–8. These eight points are the fewest points ever scored in a North Carolina game.

By the end of the season, North Carolina had won the regular season when going into the Southern Conference Tournament. In the Southern Conference Tournament, North Carolina made it to the finals and beat Mississippi State in the finals to win the tournament. This would be the third year in a row that the Tar Heels won the Southern Conference regular season and the Southern Conference Tournament all while having three different head coaches. The final Premo-Porretta Power Poll has North Carolina ranked #18.

After the season ended, Sanborn left as head coach of the Tar Heels and James N. Ashmore took over as head coach. This would be the fourth coaching change in four years.

== Head coaching record ==
Record table
Season	Team	Overall	Conference	Standing	Postseason
Virginia Tech Hokies (Independent) (1916–1917)
1916–17	Virginia Tech	17–2			
Virginia Tech:		17–2			
North Carolina Tar Heels (Southern Conference) (1925–1926)
1925–26	North Carolina	20–5	7–0	T–1st	
North Carolina:		20–5	7–0		
Total:		37–7			
National champion Postseason invitational champion Conference regular season champion Conference regular season and conference tournament champion Division regular season champion Division regular season and conference tournament champion Conference tournament champion
