= Dave Monk =

British broadcaster (1952 or 1953 – 2025)

Dave Monk DL
- Born: David Travis; 1952 or 1953; Southend-On-Sea, Essex, England
- Died: December 2025 (aged 72); Chelmsford, Essex, England
- Presenting career
- Station: BBC Essex (1986–2023)
- Style: Presenter

David Travis (1952 or 1953 – December 2025), known professionally as Dave Monk, was a British television and radio broadcaster, best known for his work at BBC Essex and BBC Look East. Monk was also a Deputy Lieutenant of Essex.

== Career ==
In the 1970s and 80s, Monk worked as a law lecturer and DJ in Essex nightclubs. While starting his radio career, he also ran a law practice and co-owned a wine bar. In November 1986, he joined BBC Essex. Monk interviewed well known individuals throughout his career, including Dame Vera Lynn and Sir Paul McCartney. He retired in September 2023.

Monk was a Governor of the North Essex Partnership NHS Foundation Trust and a Director and Trustee of Disability Essex. Monk previously wrote a column for the Essex Life Magazine. Monk wrote a book called Whatever happened to Dave Monk? released 18 September 2025, on Amazon.

== Personal life and death ==
Monk was born in Southend-on-Sea, Essex and moved at age 10 to the White Horse Inn, Ramsden Heath where his parents became publicans. Whilst living there, Monk developed his love of music and theatre. He was married to his wife Caroline. Monk attended King Edward Vl Grammar School, Chelmsford and thereafter gained an honours degree in Law from the University of London. He qualified as a Solicitor and moved into Law Lecturing.

On 5 December 2025, it was announced he had died in Farleigh Hospice after previously being diagnosed with pancreatic cancer in 2024. He was 72. Tributes from listeners and colleagues were shared on social media. Upon his death, he was called the "voice of Essex". A special tribute programme was broadcast on BBC Essex on the same day.

== Awards ==
In 2008, Monk was appointed a Deputy Lieutenant of the County of Essex in recognition of his community and charity work.

== Books ==
- Monk, Dave (18 September 2025). WHATEVER HAPPENED TO DAVE MONK?: The Essex life of a 'BBC legend. ISBN 9798286379613.
