= Monck Mason =

Monck Mason is an Irish surname. People with the name include:

- Henry Joseph Monck Mason (1778–1858), Irish writer
- Henry Monck-Mason Moore (1887–1964), British colonial governor
- Henry Monck Mason Hackett (1849–1933), Irish clergyman
- John Monck Mason (1726–1809), Irish politician
- Thomas Monck Mason (1803–1889), Irish musician and balloonist
  - Monck Mason, fictional character from Edgar Allan Poe's The Balloon-Hoax, loosely based on Thomas
