= Spiders (British band) =

- Origin: Rotherham, England
- Genres: Indie, alternative
- Years active: 2010–present
- Members: Rob Tingle; Adam Tingle; Nick Monk
- Website: www.spidersband.com

Spiders is a three-piece indie band from Rotherham, England. Close school friends, the band came together through "lack of anything better to do and a similar taste in music." Main influences on the band are The Jam, Blur and The Libertines.

Composed of brothers Rob Tingle, Adam Tingle, and friend Nick Monk, the band were taught by Alex Turner's father a Rawmarsh Comprehensive School. Spiders was a result of numerous bands and projects, which formed in the Summer of 2010.

Since then the band have gigged almost constantly in and around Yorkshire. So far the band have recorded two EPs with Arctic Monkeys' producer, Alan Smyth; the first, Daring to Wish, Daring to Smile, Daring to Wonder, has received acclaim from regional press. In March 2011, the band formed Subtonic Records, and released their first promotional single "Where Does this Leave us Now", which has garnered 60,000 views on YouTube so far. Following up, and with further collaborations with filmmaker, Andy Little, the band has also released further promos: "Ambitions of a Huckster's Daughter", and "Subtle Differences".

== Discography ==
=== EPs ===
- Daring to Wish, Daring to Smile, Daring to Wonder

=== Singles ===
- "Where Does this Leave us Now"
- "Ambitions of a Huckster's Daughter"
- "Subtle Differences"
