= Monk (experimental music band) =

American band

Monk is the brainchild of former Over the Rhine guitarist Ric Hordinski. While augmented by other musicians in the studio and in concert (including former OTR drummer Brian Kelley), Monk is essentially a moniker for Hordinski's solo projects.

In addition to releasing several albums under the Monk name, Hordinski released one, When I Consider How My Light Is Spent, under his own name, although the album continued in the same vein as his earlier Monk releases.

Hordinski has also lent his performing and producing skills to a number of artists, including David Wilcox, Phil Keaggy. Kim Taylor, Daniel Martin Moore, Janet Pressley and David Wolfenberger.

== Discography ==
- 1997 - Quiver
- 1998 - Hush
- 1999 - Blink
- 2000 - "O" (EP)
- 2001 - How Like a Winter (holiday album)
- 2003 - When I Consider How My Light Is Spent (as Ric Hordinski)
- 2005 - 12/05 (EP, CDR)
- 2007 - The Silence of Everything Yearned For
- 2009 - Notes From the Monastery (various artists produced by Ric)
- 2013- Arthur's Garden
