= Pete Monks =

Footballer (born 1986)

Personal information
- Date of birth: 3 October 1986 (age 40)
- Place of birth: Truro, England
- Height: 1.84 m (6 ft 0 in)
- Position: Left-back

Senior career*
Years	Team	Apps	(Gls)
2004–2005	Exeter City	0	(0)
2005–2006	Dorchester Town	0	(0)
2006–2007	Taunton Town		
2007–2009	Bridgwater Town		
2011–2012	Bridgwater Town		
2012–2014	Weston-super-Mare	33	(2)
2013	→ Paulton Rovers (loan)	1	(0)
2013	→ Chippenham Town (loan)		
2014–2017	Chippenham Town		

International career
2015–2016	British Virgin Islands	5	(0)
- * Club domestic league appearances and goals

Pete Monks (born 3 October 1986) is a former footballer who played left-back.

Born in England, he represented the British Virgin Islands at international level.

== Club career ==
Born in Truro, Monks has played club football for Exeter City, Dorchester Town, Taunton Town, Bridgwater Town, Weston-super-Mare, Paulton Rovers and Chippenham Town.

Monks re-joined Bridgwater Town in 2011 following a two-year spell living in Australia.

He signed a new contract with Weston-super-Mare in June 2013. Whilst at the club he had loan spells with Paulton Rovers and Chippenham Town during the 2013–14 season, before moving to Chippenham on a permanent basis the following season.

== International career ==
Monks made his international debut for the British Virgin Islands in 2015. He was invited to represent the nation by Daniel Barker, whose cousin works for the BVI Football Association.
