= Monks Collection =

The Monks Collection is a collection of philatelic material relating to South African Airmails from 1911 to 1960 that forms part of the British Library Philatelic Collections. It was formed by David Monks and bequeathed to the Library in 1981. As of October 2007 it was held in six boxes.
