= Monkey (disambiguation) =

A monkey is a tailed simian.

Monkey(s) or The Monkey may also refer to:

== Arts, entertainment, and media ==
=== Fictional characters ===
- Monkey (character), a puppet sock monkey who is best known for appearing in adverts for ITV Digital and PG Tips
- Monkey, a character in the animated TV series Dexter's Laboratory
- Monkey D. Luffy, a character in the anime series One Piece
- Monkey King, a character in the novel Journey to the West

=== Literature ===
- Monkey (novel), a translation by Arthur Waley of the Chinese story Journey to the West
- "The Monkey", a short story by Stephen King

=== Music ===
- Monkey (band), a California ska band
- "Monkey" (song), by George Michael
- "Monkey", a song by Counting Crows on the album Recovering the Satellites
- "Monkey", a song by Harry Belafonte on the album Jump Up Calypso
- "Monkey", a song by Bush on the album Sixteen Stone
- "Monkey", a song by Low on the album The Great Destroyer
- "Monkey", a song by M.I on the album The Chairman
- "Monkey", a song by Saves the Day on the album In Reverie
- Monkey, an album by Jai Uttal
- "Monkeys", a song by Echo & the Bunnymen on the 1980 album Crocodiles

=== Other media ===
- Monkey (TV series), a 1978–1980 live-action TV series based on Journey to the West
- The Monkey (film), a 2025 horror film based on a short story by Stephen King
- Monkey (magazine), a free weekly men's magazine published from 2006 to 2013

=== Other uses in arts, entertainment, and media ===
- Monkey (dance), a novelty dance popular in 1963
- Monkey: Journey to the West, a stage adaptation of Journey to the West

== Brands and enterprises ==
- Monkey, a model in the Honda Z series of motorcycles

== Other uses ==
- Monkey (zodiac), a Chinese zodiac sign
- Monkey, a London slang term meaning £500
- HMS Monkey, the name of several Royal Navy vessels
- Monkey squat, the name sometimes given to a partial squat
- Monkey Kung Fu, a Chinese martial art

== See also ==
- Monkey Business (disambiguation)
- The Monkees, an American pop/rock band
