= William Monk (artist, born 1977) =

British artist (born 1977)

- Born: 1977 (age 48–49); Kingston upon Thames, UK
- Education: De Ateliers, Amsterdam; Kingston University (BA (Hons) Fine Art)
- Known for: Painting
- Website: www.williammonk.com

William Monk (born 1977) is a British painter known for his highly stylised and painterly landscape oil paintings.

== Life and career ==
William Monk was born in Kingston upon Thames, United Kingdom. Growing up, he was inspired by Post-Impressionist painters such as Vincent van Gogh and Paul Cézanne, noting that they built upon the earlier generation and furthered stylisation.

In 1997, Monk enrolled at Kingston University to pursue a Bachelor of Arts (Hons) in Fine Art. At the time, the British art scene revolved around conceptual artists (often referred to as the Young British Artists, or YBAs) such as Tracey Emin and Damien Hirst. As painting was seen as an outdated medium during this era, Monk recalls being one of the last students in his class still painting by the end of his three-year degree.

After graduating, Monk briefly suspended his painting practice to explore filmmaking. However, he soon returned to the medium and moved to Amsterdam to attend De Ateliers, an independent art institute. During this period, his career gained momentum when he won the Dutch Royal Award for Painting. Shortly after, Monk signed with the Amsterdam-based GRIMM gallery.

His early exhibitions were primarily held within the Netherlands. In 2014 his work was showcased in New York by the James Cohan Gallery, marking his international debut. The following year, the Kohn Gallery hosted his first exhibition in Los Angeles.

In 2019, Monk signed with Pace Gallery, subsequently staging exhibitions in London, New York, Los Angeles, Hong Kong, and Tokyo.

In 2024, the Long Museum in Shanghai hosted Psychopomp, Monk's first solo exhibition in mainland China. The exhibition later travelled to the Sifang Art Museum in Nanjing and the He Art Museum in Shunde.

== Work ==
The subject matter of Monk's paintings ranges from concrete, real-world references to entirely imaginary spaces. For instance, his work references specific historical and architectural sources, such as the cockpit of the Enola Gay in Hive (2006) or the minimalist architecture of the Neuendorf House in House of Nowhere III (2024–2025). In contrast, other projects evoke anonymity and myth, such as the Son of Nowhere (2023-) series, which features six columns against a desert-like backdrop, and the Ferryman series, named after the Greek mythological figure who carries the dead to the afterlife.

Monk frequently utilises repetition in his practice, often exhibiting groups of paintings that share similar compositions. This approach dates back to his 2008 exhibition Paintings at Grimm gallery in his Institute series. Monk has likened this repetitive process to a mantra that transcends its literal meaning over time, explaining that the practice allows him to move beyond initial concepts. Regarding this methodology, the artist observes: “The idea of painting as mantra interests me: paintings as objects, figurations as images and models used as vibrations to reach somewhere else, beyond ourselves.”

Monk works without assistants, a practice that has become increasingly uncommon among contemporary artists.

== Awards ==
Monk received the Dutch Royal Award for Painting in 2005, and the Jerwood Contemporary Painters Prize in 2009.
