= Sarah P. Monks =

American naturalist, educator, scientific illustrator, and poet

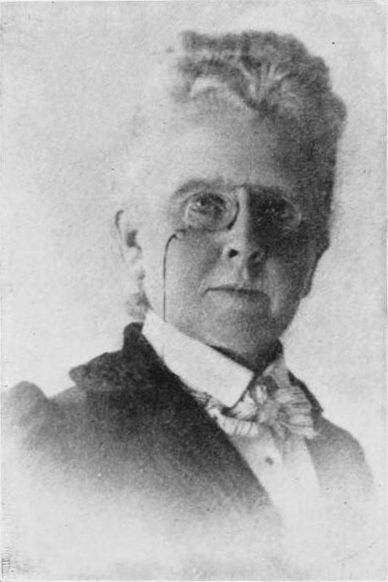
- Born: 1841; Cold Spring, New York
- Died: July 10, 1926 (aged 85); San Pedro, California
- Education: Vassar College
- Scientific career
- Fields: Zoology
- Institutions: Los Angeles State Normal School

Sarah Preston Monks (1841–1926) was an American naturalist, educator, scientific illustrator, and poet, based for much of her career in San Pedro, California. Monks was the first zoology instructor at Los Angeles State Normal School, a precursor to the University of California, Los Angeles, where she taught for over 20 years, and published on diverse topics including reptiles, amphibians, spiders, and marine biology.

== Early life and education ==
Sarah Preston Monks was born in Cold Spring, New York, the daughter of John Monks and Sarah Charlotte Monks (née Jolly).

Her brother John A. S. Monks became a noted New England artist and her sister Mary E. Monks lived in Massachusetts.

She studied at Vassar College, where she earned a bachelor's degree in 1871 and a master's degree in 1876. She read one of her own poems, "Waiting for the Tide", at Vassar's 1871 graduation ceremony. She pursued further technical training at the Woman's Medical College of Pennsylvania.

== Career ==
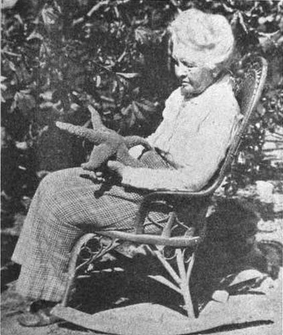
Sarah P. Monks, seated, holding a starfish specimen, from a 1920 publication.

While still in Philadelphia, she worked at the Academy of Natural Sciences, classifying ornithological specimens. She later moved to California, where she taught for one year at the College of Santa Barbara before joining the faculty of the Los Angeles State Normal School in 1884 where she became the school's first instructor of zoology. She taught zoology, chemistry and drawing at the Normal School until her retirement in 1906 and was curator of the school's museum. She also lectured on entomology and microscopy at the school's Teachers' Institutes (continuing education programs for teachers in Southern California). Meanwhile, she worked on research projects in her own time, and in collaboration with the William Emerson Ritter's laboratory on Terminal Island. She collected specimens and published scientific and popular articles on turtles, lizards, salamanders, spiders, shipworms, and diatoms. She also published poetry. In her seventies, she consulted on topics including marine biology, entomology, botany, and geology from her cottage and garden in San Pedro. "I am pleasing myself as I please," she explained of her unconventional interests. "I have been bossed all my life."

Publications by Monks included the textbook Anatomy Physiology Hygiene (though she was not credited as author of this text, only as illustrator), "A Partial Biography of the Green Lizard" (The American Naturalist, 1881), "Regeneration of the Body of a Starfish" (Proceedings of the Academy of Natural Sciences of Philadelphia, 1903), "Variability and Autotomy of Phataria" (Proceedings of the Academy of Natural Sciences of Philadelphia 1904). She was listed as a member of the Woods Hole Marine Biological Laboratory in 1888, and in 1894 as a founding member of the laboratory's Biological Association. The snail Fusinus monksae is believed to have been named for her.

== Personal life ==
Monks had a cottage named "Phataria" on Sea Pansy Bay in the Los Angeles Harbor, next door to the cottage of her friend, Charles Fletcher Lummis. Monk's lamp and stove were purchased from the wreckage of the Portland ship and the chair on her porch was made from an old ship's rudder. She donated her library of scientific publications and other materials to the Natural History Museum of Los Angeles County in 1915. She died in San Pedro on July 10, 1926, aged 85 years.
