= John Austin Sands Monks =

American artist

John A. S. Monks
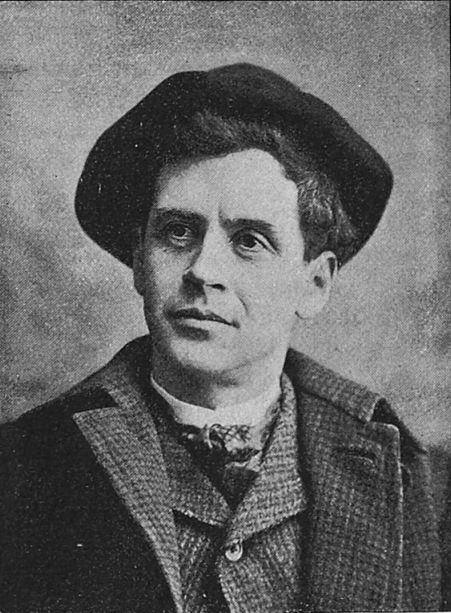
- Born: November 7, 1850; Cold Spring, New York
- Died: March 14, 1917 (aged 66); Chicago, Illinois
- Known for: Paintings of sheep and for designing the corporate seal of the town of Medfield, Massachusetts

John Austin Sands Monks (1850–1917) was an American painter and etcher known especially for his paintings of sheep. Born in Cold Spring, New York, to John and Sarah Catherine Monks, he was educated at the Hudson River Institute and studied engraving under George N. Cass and painting under George Inness. He was a longtime resident of Medfield, Massachusetts and designed that town's corporate seal in 1896, which is also featured on the town's flag. He also had a studio in Boston. He was a member of the Boston Art Club, the Copley Society, the Salmagundi Club, and the New York Etching Club. His sister was the naturalist Sarah P. Monks. He died in Chicago while visiting his daughter at the age of 66.
