= George Monks (cricketer) =

English cricketer

George Derek Monks (3 September 1929 – 3 January 2011) was an English first-class cricketer, who played one match for Yorkshire County Cricket Club in 1952. He was born in Sheffield, Yorkshire, England.

The match, against Scotland at Hamilton Crescent, Glasgow, was won by Yorkshire by four wickets thanks to Ronald Wood taking 8 for 45, and bowling Scotland out for 107 in their second innings. Monks kept wicket in the game, catching Ronald Chisholm off the bowling of Brian Close. He scored three, batting at number 10, in Yorkshire's first innings.

He was the Sheffield United Cricket Club's wicket-keeper, and he also played for the Yorkshire Second XI from 1952 to 1954.
