= Monk McDonald =

American college athlete, basketball coach

Biographical details
- Born: February 21, 1901; Charlotte, North Carolina, U.S.
- Died: September 2, 1977 (aged 76); Charlotte, North Carolina, U.S.

Playing career

Basketball
- 1920–1924: North Carolina
- Positions: Quarterback (football); Guard (basketball); Shortstop (baseball)

Coaching career (HC unless noted)

Basketball
- 1924–1925: North Carolina

Head coaching record
- Overall: 20–5

Accomplishments and honors

Championships
- As a player: 1922 – Southern Conference Tournament Championship; 1923 – Southern Conference Regular Season Champion; 1924 – Helms Athletic Foundation National Champion; As a coach: 1925 – Southern Conference Regular Season Champion; 1925 – Southern Conference Tournament Champion

Angus Morris "Monk" McDonald (February 21, 1901 – September 2, 1977) was an American college athlete, a head coach for the North Carolina Tar Heels men's basketball team, and a urologist. He is best known for his time as a college athlete playing football, basketball, and baseball for the University of North Carolina at Chapel Hill, and is generally considered the best all-around college athlete to attend the University of North Carolina. For his collegiate and coaching career, he was inducted in the North Carolina Sports Hall of Fame.

== Early years ==
Monk McDonald was born as Angus Morris McDonald on February 21, 1901, in Charlotte, North Carolina to Angus Morris, Sr. and Ann Howard McDonald. Monk McDonald's father, Angus Morris Sr., was the founder of the Southern Real Estate Company and was a chairman on the Mecklenburg County Board of Commissioners. McDonald attended Charlotte High School and Fishburne Military School before attending the University of North Carolina at Chapel Hill.

== College ==
While at North Carolina, McDonald, who was 5 feet, 7 inches, played quarterback on the football team, guard on the men's basketball team, and shortstop on the baseball team. McDonald lettered in all three sports for all four years. He is generally considered the best all-around athlete in North Carolina sports history.

McDonald also won the first Patterson Medal, the most prestigious award for student-athletes at the University of North Carolina, for his collegiate career in 1924.

=== Football and baseball ===
McDonald lettered in football for the four years that he attended North Carolina. McDonald most successful season in football came in 1922 when, as quarterback, he led North Carolina to a 9–1 record and led North Carolina to a first place standing in the Southern Conference. During one game that season, McDonald had a kickoff return of 95 yards against in-state rival NC State, which is the ninth longest kickoff return in North Carolina football history.

During his baseball career, McDonald batted over .300 and helped his team to 19 wins and only two losses during the 1922 season. McDonald was good enough to be considered a prospective professional baseball player.

=== Basketball ===
McDonald first played for North Carolina under head coach Fred Boye for the 1920–21 season, and during this season North Carolina earned a 12–8 record. After the 1920–21 season, North Carolina was without a head coach for two years after Boye left the team.

During the 1921–22 season, North Carolina played its first season in the Southern Conference, gained a 15–6 record, and won the first Southern Conference Tournament. McDonald was named all-Southern Conference—an award given annually to the best basketball players during the regular season in the Southern Conference division—at the end of this season. McDonald was captain of North Carolina during the 1922–23 season, and he led the coachless team to a 15–1 record, which tied North Carolina for first place in the Southern Conference regular season standings.

Before the start of the 1923–24 season, Norman Shepard became the head coach of North Carolina. Beside McDonald, there were several other talented players on the 1923–24 team, including senior Cartwright Carmichael, who was the first North Carolina All-American in any sport, and Jack Cobb, who would later be named to the All-American team and would later have his number retired at North Carolina. This team earned the nickname the "White Phantoms" because of their fast playmaking and defense. McDonald was named all-Southern Conference and all-Southern Conference Tournament team – an award given annually to the best players in the Southern Conference basketball tournament – for his play during the 1923–24 season. The 1923–24 North Carolina team managed to win all 26 games they played that year. Because there was no national post-season tournament, the final game for North Carolina was in the Southern Conference tournament against the University of Alabama Crimson Tide. North Carolina managed to win the game 26–18. The local news reported that hundreds of students at North Carolina "waited in the streets in front of telegraph offices and cafes" for news about the game and after the victory students "went wild" and set a bonfire on the athletic field. In 1936, the Helms Athletic Foundation retroactively awarded a national championship to the 1923–24 North Carolina men's basketball team since there had been no organization to award national championships at the time. This was the first national championship given to a North Carolina men's basketball team.

== Coaching at North Carolina ==
After coaching North Carolina for one season, Norman Shepard went to the Far East to work as a sales manager for Liggett and Meyer tobacco company, which left the position of head coach open. Even though McDonald has just graduated from North Carolina and had started to attend medical school full-time, he became the next head coach after Shepard's departure. McDonald was the first former player to become head coach of the North Carolina men's basketball team; Matt Doherty would be the second.

When McDonald took over, there were still many seasoned veterans on the team including Jack Cobb. McDonald continued the team's winning streak from the previous season for the first eight games, but North Carolina eventually lost to the Harvard Crimson basketball team, ending their 34-game winning streak. Although the team would lose another four games, North Carolina went through the regular season unbeaten when playing at its home arena, the Tin Can. That season McDonald's team also managed to win the Southern Conference regular season for the second year in a row and win the Southern Conference Tournament beating Tulane University in the finals, which McDonald did not attend due to his medical studies. North Carolina would end the 1924–25 season with a 20–5 record.

=== Head coaching record ===
Record table
Season	Team	Overall	Conference	Standing	Postseason
North Carolina Tar Heels (Southern Conference) (1924–1925)
1924–25	North Carolina	20–5	8–0	1st	
North Carolina:		20–5	8–0		
Total:		20–5			
National champion Postseason invitational champion Conference regular season champion Conference regular season and conference tournament champion Division regular season champion Division regular season and conference tournament champion Conference tournament champion

== Later years ==
McDonald gave up coaching after one year and instead focused on attending medical school. In 1926, McDonald transferred to the University of Pennsylvania School of Medicine and graduated with a medical degree in 1928.

After graduating from medical school, McDonald practiced as both a urologist and a surgeon. He later worked at a variety of hospitals and clinics including the Protestant Episcopal Hospital in Philadelphia, the Mayo Clinic in Rochester, Minnesota, NewYork–Presbyterian Hospital, and the Vanderbilt Clinic in New York City. In 1935, McDonald moved back to North Carolina and joined the practice of Dr. Fred Patterson. McDonald left this practice in 1939 to help the Crowell Clinic. In 1942 he became lieutenant commander in United States Naval Medical Corps. He transferred to San Francisco in 1944 to work in naval hospital there. He was discharged from the United States Navy after World War II. After the war, McDonald resumed a urology practice in Charlotte and worked with the Crowell Clinic until his retirement in 1969.

McDonald was inducted into the North Carolina Sports Hall of Fame on February 17, 1977. McDonald died on September 2, 1977, seven months after being inducted, at the age of 76.

== Personal life ==
McDonald married Mary Letitia Mebane in 1939 and had three children: Letitia, Mebane, and Angus. All of his children graduated from the University of North Carolina. He is buried in Elmwood Cemetery.
