= Walter Skidmore =

American basketball coach

- Skidmore pictured in Yackety yak 1936, UNC yearbook

Biographical details
- Born: November 19, 1903; Kentucky, U.S.
- Died: April 13, 1993 (aged 89); Chapel Hill, North Carolina, U.S.

Coaching career (HC unless noted)
- 1935–1939: North Carolina

Head coaching record
- Overall: 65–25

Accomplishments and honors

Championships
- 1938 - Southern Conference regular season 1936 - Southern Conference Tournament

Walter Dennis Skidmore (November 19, 1903 – April 13, 1993) was an American basketball coach. He was best known for being the head coach of the North Carolina Tar Heels men's basketball team from 1935 to 1939. Skidmore had a record of 65–25 with the Tar Heels and led his team to win the Southern Conference Tournament in 1936 and Southern Conference regular season championship in 1938. In his last year of coaching, Skidmore coached George Glamack, who went on to become a star player at North Carolina. Skidmore took over coaching after Bo Shepard left as head coach due to health problems. Skidmore was a native of Harlan County, Kentucky, and the son of a coal miner. He attended Centre College in Kentucky, graduating in 1926. Before becoming the head basketball coach at North Carolina, Skidmore had coached the North Carolina junior varsity and Charlotte High School teams. He retired from coaching in 1939 and moved to Letcher County, Kentucky. From 1955 to 1970, Skidmore operated the Tar Heel Motel in Clinton, North Carolina. In April 1993, Skidmore died in Chapel Hill, North Carolina at age 89.

== Head coaching record ==
Record table
Season	Team	Overall	Conference	Standing	Postseason
North Carolina Tar Heels (Southern Conference) (1935–1939)
1935–36	North Carolina	21–4	13–3	2nd	
1936–37	North Carolina	18–5	14–3	2nd	
1937–38	North Carolina	16–5	13–3	1st	
1938–39	North Carolina	10–11	8–7	7th	
North Carolina:		65–25	48–16		
Total:		65–25			
National champion Postseason invitational champion Conference regular season champion Conference regular season and conference tournament champion Division regular season champion Division regular season and conference tournament champion Conference tournament champion
