= Fred Boye =

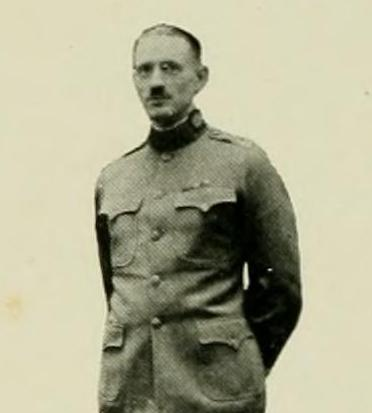
- Boye pictured in Yackety yak 1921, UNC yearbook

Coaching career (HC unless noted)
- 1919–1921: North Carolina

Head coaching record
- Overall: 19–17

Frederick William Boye was an American basketball coach. He served as the head basketball coach at University of North Carolina from 1919 to 1921.

== Coaching at North Carolina ==
Prior to Boye, Howell Peacock was the head coach for the North Carolina Tar Heels men's basketball team. Peacock had managed to make the Tar Heels one of the best teams in the South in the 1917–18 season, earning a record of 9–3, but he failed to repeat his success in the 1918–19 season, with the Tar Heels earning a record of 9–7.

After Peacock's departure, Boye was hired to coach the team. Boye, a former World War I veteran, took over an experienced Tar Heel squad, but even so, he only managed to obtain a 7–9 record his first year, including one loss to the Durham YMCA. In his second year, he was more successful, earning a 12–8 record and going undefeated at home.

During the 1920–21 season, North Carolina — along with thirteen other universities — split from the Southern Intercollegiate Athletic Association to create the Southern Conference on February 25, 1921, in Atlanta. Although the new conference was established during the 1920–21 season, North Carolina did not play basketball games in the conference until the following year.

Boye left as head coach after the conclusion of the 1920–21 season. The Tar Heels did not secure a replacement for head coach for the next two seasons. Nevertheless, they managed to be more successful than they were under Boye. In the 1921–22 season, the team went 15–6 and won the Southern Conference Tournament. In the 1922–23 season, they had even more success going 15–1, undefeated in conference play, and tying for first in the Southern Conference. Boye was also professor of military training at the university.

== Head coaching record ==
Record table
| Season | Team | Overall | Conference | Standing | Postseason |
|---|---|---|---|---|---|
North Carolina Tar Heels (Independent) (1919–1921)
| 1919–20 | North Carolina | 7–9 | | | |
| 1920–21 | North Carolina | 12–8 | | | |
| North Carolina: | | 19–17 | | | |
| Total: | | 19–17 | | | |

== Sources ==
- Powell, Adam (2005). University of North Carolina Basketball. Arcadia Publishing. ISBN 0-7385-4150-8.
- "2009–10 Basketball Carolina Tar Heels Media Guide" (PDF). UNC Athletic Communications. Archived from the original (PDF) on November 12, 2012.
- Rappoport, Ken (2002). Tales from the Tar Heel Locker Room. Sports Publishing LLC. ISBN 1-58261-489-X. "Charles Doak basketball."
