= James N. Ashmore =

American football, basketball and baseball coach and college athletics administrator

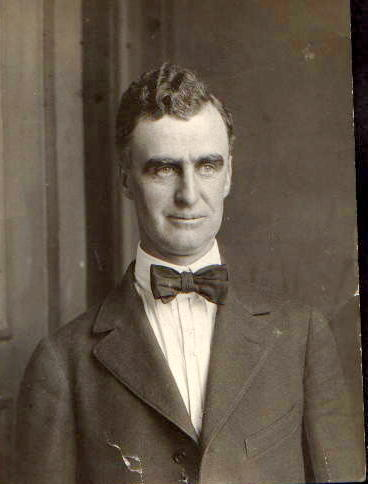

Biographical details
- Born: November 11, 1878; Richview, Illinois, U.S.
- Died: April 26, 1944 (aged 65); Danville, Illinois, U.S.

Playing career

Baseball
- 1902–1903: Illinois
- Position: First baseman

Coaching career (HC unless noted)

Football
- 1903: Washington Agricultural
- 1904–1906: Millikin
- 1907–1908: Western Maryland
- 1909–1913: Millikin
- 1919–1921: Iowa (assistant)
- 1922–1924: DePauw

Basketball
- 1904–1905: Washington Agricultural
- 1905–1907: Millikin
- 1909–1914: Millikin
- 1914–1917: Colorado
- 1920–1922: Iowa
- 1923–1924: DePauw
- 1926–1931: North Carolina

Baseball
- 1904: Washington Agricultural
- 1905–1906: Millikin
- 1910–1914: Millikin
- 1915–1917: Colorado
- 1920–1922: Iowa
- 1923–1924: DePauw
- 1927–1931: North Carolina
- 1940: Millikin

Head coaching record
- Overall: 61–46–9 (football); 178–117 (basketball); 170–99–6 (baseball, excluding Colorado)

Accomplishments and honors

Championships
- Football; 1 IIAC (1911)

James Newton Ashmore (November 11, 1878 – April 26, 1944) was an American football, basketball and baseball coach and college athletics administrator. He served as the head football coach at the Washington Agricultural College and School of Science—now known as Washington State University—(1903), Millikin University (1904–1906, 1909–1913), Western Maryland College—now known as McDaniel College–(1907–1908), and DePauw University (1922–1924), compiling a career college football record of 61–46–9. Ashmore was also the head basketball coach at Washington Agricultural (1904–1905), Millikin (1905–1907, 1909–1914), the University of Colorado at Boulder (1914–1917), the University of Iowa (1920–1922), DePauw (1923–1924) and the University of North Carolina at Chapel Hill (1926–1931), tallying a career college basketball mark of 178–117. In addition, he was the head baseball coach at Washington Agricultural (1904), Millikin (1905–1906, 1910–1914, 1940), Colorado, (1915–1917), Iowa (1920–1922), DePauw (1923–1924) and North Carolina (1927–1931).

== Coaching career ==
Ashmore was the eighth head coach for the Washington State Cougars football team and held the position for the 1903 season. His coaching record at Washington State was 3–3–2.

Ashmore was the head coach at Western Maryland for the 1907 and 1908 seasons. While there, he compiled a 9–8–3 record.

== Late life and death ==
Ashmore was elected the township assessor of Decatur, Illinois as a Republican. He died on April 26, 1944, at the Veteran's Hospital in Danville, Illinois, following a illness of ten weeks.

== Head coaching record ==
=== Football ===
Year	Team	Overall	Conference	Standing	Bowl/playoffs
Washington Agricultural (Independent) (1903)
1903	Washington Agricultural	3–3–2			
Washington Agricultural:		3–3–2			
Millikin Big Blue (Independent) (1904–1906)
1904	Millikin	5–3			
1905	Millikin	7–2			
1906	Millikin	5–2			
Western Maryland Green Terror (Independent) (1907–1908)
1907	Western Maryland	4–4–1			
1908	Western Maryland	5–4–2			
Western Maryland:		9–8–3			
Millikin Big Blue (Illinois Intercollegiate Athletic Conference) (1909–1913)
1909	Millikin	5–2–1			
1910	Millikin	4–4			
1911	Millikin	7–2		1st	
1912	Millikin	3–5			
1913	Millikin	4–3			
Millikin:		40–23–1			
DePauw Tigers (Independent) (1922–1924)
1922	DePauw	4–3–2			
1923	DePauw	4–2–1			
1924	DePauw	1–7			
DePauw:		9–12–3			
Total:		61–46–9			
National championship Conference title Conference division title or championship game berth

=== Basketball ===
Record table
Season	Team	Overall	Conference	Standing	Postseason
North Carolina Tar Heels (Southern Conference) (1926–1931)
1926–27	North Carolina	17–7	7–3	8th	
1927–28	North Carolina	17–2	8–1	T–3rd	
1928–29	North Carolina	17–8	12–2	2nd	
1929–30	North Carolina	14–11	4–7	6th	
1930–31	North Carolina	15–9	6–6	T–9th	
North Carolina:		80–37	37–19		
Total:		80–37			
