= 1925–26 NCAA men's basketball season =

Men's collegiate basketball season

- Helms National Champions: Syracuse (retroactive selection in 1943)
- Player of the Year (Helms): Jack Cobb, North Carolina (retroactive selection in 1944)

The 1925–26 NCAA men's basketball season began in December 1925, progressed through the regular season and conference tournaments, and concluded in March 1926.

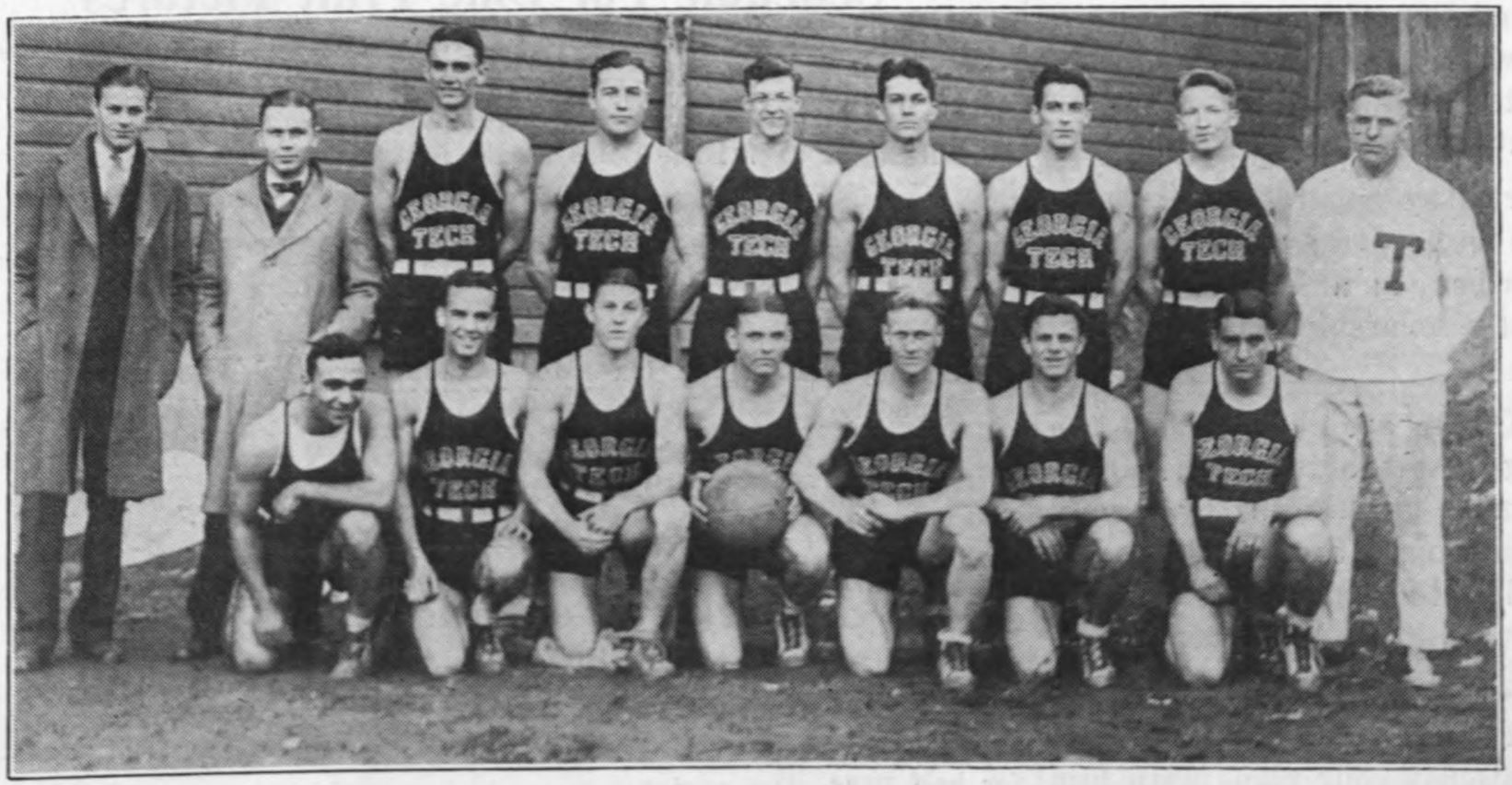
Georgia Tech's team

== Season headlines ==
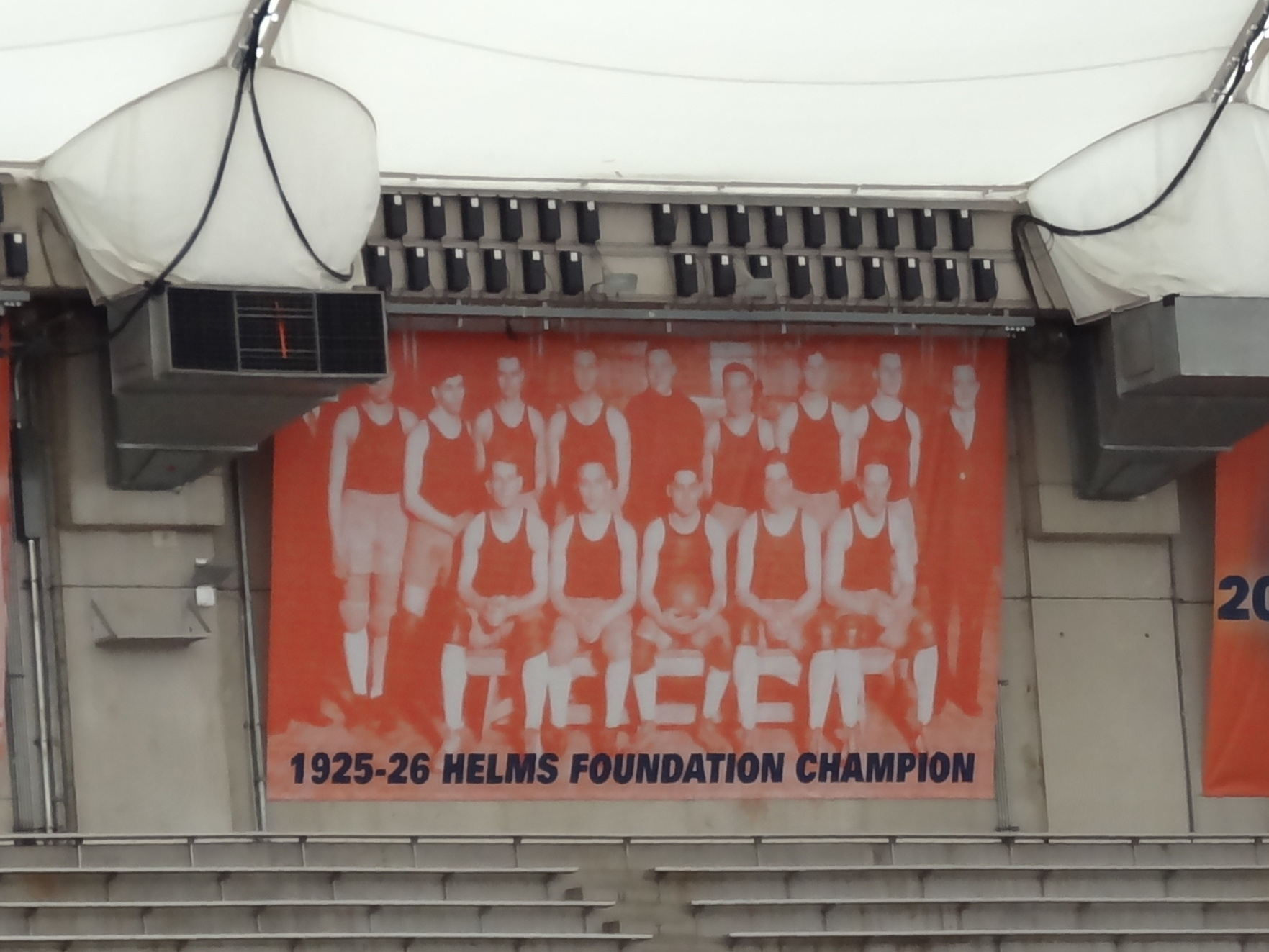
1925–26 Syracuse Orangemen basketball team

- In February 1943, the Helms Athletic Foundation retroactively selected Syracuse as its national champion for the 1925–26 season.
- In 1995, the Premo-Porretta Power Poll retroactively selected Syracuse as its top-ranked team for the 1925–26 season.

== Conference membership changes ==
School	Former conference	New conference
Oklahoma A&M Aggies	Southwest Conference	Missouri Valley Conference
USC Trojans	Independent	Pacific Coast Conference
Union Dutchmen	Independent	Non-major basketball program
VMI Keydets	Independent	Southern Conference

== Regular season ==
=== Conferences ===
==== Conference winners and tournaments ====
Conference	Regular season winner	Conference player of the year	Conference tournament	Tournament venue (City)	Tournament winner
Big Ten Conference	Indiana, Iowa, Michigan, & Purdue	None selected	No Tournament		
Eastern Intercollegiate Basketball League	Columbia	None selected	No Tournament		
Missouri Valley Intercollegiate Athletic Association	Kansas	None selected	No Tournament		
Pacific Coast Conference	Oregon (North); California (South)		No Tournament; California defeated Oregon in best-of-three conference championship playoff series		
Rocky Mountain Athletic Conference	Colorado Agricultural & Colorado State Normal (Eastern); Utah & Utah Agricultural (Western)		No Tournament		
Southern Conference	Kentucky	None selected	1926 Southern Conference men's basketball tournament	Municipal Auditorium (Atlanta, Georgia)	North Carolina
Southwest Conference	Arkansas	None selected	No Tournament		

==== Conference standings ====
1925–26 Big Ten Conference men's basketball standings
	Conf.				Overall
Team	W		L	PCT	W		L	PCT
Purdue	8	–	4	.667	13	–	4	.765
Indiana	8	–	4	.667	12	–	5	.706
Iowa	8	–	4	.667	12	–	5	.706
Michigan	8	–	4	.667	12	–	5	.706
Illinois	6	–	6	.500	9	–	8	.529
Ohio State	6	–	6	.500	10	–	7	.588
Minnesota	5	–	7	.417	7	–	10	.412
Wisconsin	4	–	8	.333	8	–	9	.471
Northwestern	4	–	8	.333	5	–	11	.313
Chicago	3	–	9	.250	5	–	12	.294

1925–26 Eastern Intercollegiate Basketball League standings
	Conf.				Overall
Team	W		L	PCT	W		L	PCT
Columbia	9	–	1	.900	15	–	2	.882
Dartmouth	6	–	4	.600	11	–	7	.611
Penn	5	–	5	.500	14	–	7	.667
Princeton	5	–	5	.500	9	–	13	.409
Cornell	5	–	5	.500	8	–	12	.400
Yale	0	–	10	.000	5	–	15	.250

1925–26 Missouri Valley Intercollegiate Athletic Association men's basketball standings
	Conf.				Overall
Team	W		L	PCT	W		L	PCT
Kansas	16	–	2	.889	16	–	2	.889
Oklahoma	9	–	3	.750	11	–	4	.733
Kansas State	9	–	3	.750	11	–	7	.611
Missouri	8	–	8	.500	8	–	10	.444
Nebraska	7	–	7	.500	8	–	10	.444
Drake	7	–	9	.438	9	–	9	.500
Washington University	7	–	9	.438	7	–	9	.438
Oklahoma A&M	5	–	7	.417	9	–	9	.500
Iowa State	3	–	11	.214	4	–	14	.222
Grinnell	1	–	13	.071	1	–	14	.067

1925–26 Pacific Coast Conference men's basketball standings
	Conf.				Overall
Team	W		L	PCT	W		L	PCT
North
Oregon	10	–	0	1.000	18	–	4	.818
Oregon Agricultural	6	–	4	.600	18	–	6	.750
Idaho	5	–	4	.556	15	–	10	.600
Washington	5	–	5	.500	10	–	6	.625
Montana	2	–	8	.200	5	–	10	.333
Washington State	1	–	8	.111	9	–	17	.346
South
California †	5	–	0	1.000	14	–	0	1.000
Stanford	3	–	2	.600	10	–	6	.625
USC	0	–	6	.000	4	–	8	.333
† Conference playoff series winner

1925–26 Rocky Mountain Conference standings
	Conf.				Overall
Team	W		L	PCT	W		L	PCT
Eastern
Northern Colorado	13	–	1	.929	13	–	5	.722
Colorado College	9	–	4	.692	9	–	4	.692
Wyoming	7	–	5	.583	12	–	5	.706
Colorado	7	–	5	.583	8	–	5	.615
Denver	5	–	7	.417	5	–	7	.417
Colorado Mines	3	–	7	.300	3	–	7	.300
Colorado Agricultural	2	–	10	.167	2	–	11	.154
Western State	0	–	5	.000	5	–	9	.357
Western
Utah Agricultural	8	–	4	.667	13	–	5	.722
BYU	7	–	5	.583	11	–	5	.688
Montana State	5	–	7	.417	20	–	12	.625
Utah	4	–	8	.333	4	–	8	.333

1925–26 Southern Conference men's basketball standings
	Conf.				Overall
Team	W		L	PCT	W		L	PCT
Kentucky	8	–	0	1.000	15	–	3	.833
North Carolina†	7	–	0	1.000	20	–	5	.800
Mississippi	8	–	1	.889	16	–	2	.889
Maryland	7	–	1	.875	14	–	3	.824
Georgia	9	–	4	.692	18	–	6	.750
South Carolina	4	–	2	.667	9	–	5	.643
NC State	5	–	3	.625	20	–	3	.870
Mississippi A&M	5	–	3	.625	14	–	8	.636
Tulane	10	–	7	.588	11	–	7	.611
Alabama	6	–	6	.500	10	–	11	.476
Virginia	4	–	4	.500	9	–	6	.600
LSU	4	–	5	.444	9	–	9	.500
VMI	3	–	5	.375	8	–	6	.571
Georgia Tech	4	–	10	.286	6	–	11	.353
Virginia Tech	2	–	5	.286	3	–	10	.231
Washington and Lee	2	–	6	.250	9	–	7	.563
Tennessee	1	–	3	.250	9	–	8	.529
Vanderbilt	2	–	7	.222	8	–	18	.308
Auburn	1	–	7	.125	5	–	10	.333
Clemson	1	–	7	.125	4	–	17	.190
Sewanee	0	–	2	.000	4	–	6	.400
Florida	0	–	3	.000	7	–	7	.500
† Southern Conference Tournament winner

1925–26 Southwest Conference men's basketball standings
	Conf.				Overall
Team	W		L	PCT	W		L	PCT
Arkansas	11	–	1	.917	23	–	2	.920
SMU	8	–	4	.667	10	–	6	.625
TCU	7	–	5	.583	13	–	9	.591
Texas	6	–	6	.500	12	–	10	.545
Baylor	5	–	7	.417	8	–	7	.533
Texas A&M	4	–	8	.333	8	–	9	.471
Rice	1	–	11	.083	1	–	13	.071

=== Independents ===
A total of 94 college teams played as major independents. Mount Union (10–0) was undefeated, and Notre Dame (19–1) and Syracuse (19–1) had the next-highest winning percentage (.950). North Dakota Agricultural (22–3) finished with the most wins.

1925–26 NCAA men's basketball independents standings
	Conf.				Overall
Team	W		L	PCT	W		L	PCT
Mount Union		–		–	10	–	0	1.000
Notre Dame		–		–	19	–	1	.950
Syracuse		–		–	19	–	1	.950
Manchester		–		–	15	–	1	.938
Lehigh		–		–	13	–	1	.929
Washburn		–		–	12	–	1	.923
Cincinnati		–		–	17	–	2	.895
Muskingum		–		–	17	–	2	.895
Dickinson		–		–	15	–	2	.882
North Dakota Agricultural		–		–	22	–	3	.880
UCLA		–		–	14	–	2	.875
Massachusetts		–		–	12	–	2	.857
New Mexico		–		–	12	–	2	.857
Springfield (Mass.)		–		–	10	–	2	.833
West Texas State		–		–	14	–	3	.824
Fordham		–		–	18	–	4	.818
Bradley		–		–	15	–	4	.789
Duquesne		–		–	15	–	4	.789
Western State Normal		–		–	15	–	4	.789
Connecticut		–		–	11	–	3	.786
Saint Mary's (Calif.)		–		–	11	–	3	.786
Bowling Green State		–		–	10	–	3	.769
Butler		–		–	16	–	5	.762
Tempe State		–		–	9	–	3	.750
Loyola (Md.)		–		–	9	–	3	.750
Evansville		–		–	8	–	3	.727
Richmond		–		–	16	–	6	.727
St. John's (N.Y.)		–		–	18	–	7	.720
New York University		–		–	10	–	4	.714
St. Bonaventure		–		–	15	–	6	.714
Western Kentucky State		–		–	10	–	4	.714
Navy		–		–	12	–	5	.706
Fairmount		–		–	14	–	6	.700
Saint Louis		–		–	9	–	4	.692
DePaul		–		–	11	–	5	.688
Villanova		–		–	11	–	5	.688
Detroit		–		–	13	–	6	.684
Wake Forest		–		–	13	–	6	.684
Bucknell		–		–	8	–	4	.667
Colgate		–		–	14	–	7	.667
Harvard		–		–	8	–	4	.667
Niagara		–		–	12	–	6	.667
Temple		–		–	12	–	6	.667
New Mexico A&M		–		–	13	–	7	.650
Army		–		–	11	–	6	.647
Buffalo		–		–	11	–	6	.647
Pittsburgh		–		–	11	–	6	.647
CCNY		–		–	9	–	5	.643
Brown		–		–	10	–	6	.625
The Citadel		–		–	10	–	6	.625
Ohio		–		–	15	–	9	.625
Loyola (Ill.)		–		–	13	–	8	.619
Muhlenberg		–		–	9	–	6	.600
Marshall		–		–	10	–	7	.588
Seton Hall		–		–	7	–	5	.583
St. Ignatius		–		–	8	–	6	.571
Denison		–		–	9	–	7	.563
DePauw		–		–	9	–	7	.563
Xavier		–		–	10	–	8	.556
Creighton		–		–	11	–	9	.550
Furman		–		–	11	–	9	.550
Wooster		–		–	8	–	7	.533
Carleton		–		–	7	–	7	.500
Indiana State		–		–	9	–	9	.500
Manhattan		–		–	7	–	7	.500
Penn State		–		–	7	–	7	.500
Rhode Island State		–		–	8	–	8	.500
West Virginia		–		–	10	–	11	.476
Davidson		–		–	8	–	9	.471
Holy Cross		–		–	8	–	9	.471
William & Mary		–		–	8	–	9	.471
Dayton		–		–	7	–	8	.467
Arizona		–		–	6	–	7	.462
Boston University		–		–	6	–	7	.462
Miami (Ohio)		–		–	7	–	9	.438
Kent State Normal		–		–	6	–	8	.429
Texas Tech		–		–	6	–	8	.429
Tulsa		–		–	7	–	10	.412
Duke		–		–	8	–	12	.400
Canisius		–		–	5	–	8	.385
Georgetown		–		–	5	–	8	.385
Northern Arizona State		–		–	5	–	8	.385
Marquette		–		–	8	–	13	.381
Texas State M&M		–		–	3	–	5	.375
George Washington		–		–	5	–	9	.357
Louisville		–		–	4	–	8	.333
Santa Clara		–		–	5	–	10	.333
Lafayette		–		–	6	–	13	.316
Valparaiso		–		–	6	–	13	.316
Rutgers		–		–	4	–	9	.308
Michigan State		–		–	5	–	13	.278
Toledo		–		–	3	–	8	.273
St. Joseph's		–		–	4	–	11	.267
Saint Francis (N.Y.)		–		–	1	–	6	.143

== Awards ==
=== Helms College Basketball All-Americans ===
The practice of selecting a Consensus All-American Team did not begin until the 1928–29 season. The Helms Athletic Foundation later retroactively selected a list of All-Americans for the 1925–26 season.

Player	Team
Jack Cobb	North Carolina
George Dixon	California
Richard Doyle	Michigan
Emanuel Goldblatt	Pennsylvania
Gale Gordon	Kansas
Vic Hanson	Syracuse
Carl Loeb	Princeton
Al Peterson	Kansas
George Spradling	Purdue
Algot Westergren	Oregon

=== Major player of the year awards ===
- Helms Player of the Year: Jack Cobb, North Carolina (retroactive selection in 1944)

== Coaching changes ==
A number of teams changed coaches during the season and after it ended.

Team	Former Coach	Interim Coach	New Coach	Reason
Army	Ernest Blood		Leo Novak	
Baylor	Frank Bridges		Ralph Wolf	
Brown	Harold Evans		Tuss McLaughry	
Bucknell	Malcolm Musser		John Plant	
Butler	Harlan Page		Tony Hinkle	
The Citadel	Locke Brown		Benny Blatt	
Denver	Jimmy Middlebrook		Burt Potter	
Georgia Tech	Harold Hansen		Roy Mundorff	
Kentucky	Ray Eklund		Basil Hayden	
Lehigh	Charles Lingle		Roy Geary	
Loyola (Md.)	William Schuerholz		Pat Miller	
Manhattan	Arthur T. Carroll		Chief Muller	
Marshall	Charles Tallman		Bill Strickling	
Michigan State	John Kobs		Benjamin Van Alstyne	
Missouri	George Bond		George R. Edwards	
Navy	Herb Underwood		John Wilson	
Nebraska	Ernest Bearg		Charlie T. Black	
North Carolina	Harlan Sanborn		James N. Ashmore	
North Dakota Agricultural	Ion Cortright		Leonard Saalwaechter	
Northern Arizona State	Talbert D. Jessuppe		Emzy Harvey Lynch	
Saint Joseph's	John Lavin		Tom Temple	
Saint Louis	Dan J. Savage		Squint Hunter	
Santa Clara	Russell T. Wilson		Harlan Dykes	
St. Bonaventure	Glen Carberry		Jack Flavin	
St. Francis (N.Y.)	Frank Brennan		Nip Lynch	
Stanford	Andrew Kerr		Husky Hunt	
Temple	Samuel Dienes		James Usilton	
Tennessee	M. B. Banks		W. H. Britton	
Toledo	Louis Moorhead		David V. Connelly	
Valparaiso	Millard Anderson		Conrad Moll	
Villanova	Michael Saxe		John Cashman	
Virginia Tech	M. Buford Blair		Henry Redd	
Wake Forest	R. S. Hayes		James A. Baldwin	
Washington State	Fred Bohler		Karl Schlademan	
