= List of Villanova Wildcats men's basketball seasons =

This is a list of seasons completed by the Villanova Wildcats men's college basketball team.

== Seasons ==
Statistics overview
Season	Coach	Overall	Conference	Standing	Postseason
Michael Saxe (Independent) (1920–1926)
1920–21	Michael Saxe	8–7			
1921–22	Michael Saxe	11–4			
1922–23	Michael Saxe	10–6			
1923–24	Michael Saxe	14–7			
1924–25	Michael Saxe	10–1			
1925–26	Michael Saxe	10–6			
Michael Saxe:		63–31 (.670)			
John Cashman (Independent) (1926–1929)
1926–27	John Cashman	11–7			
1927–28	John Cashman	4–11			
1928–29	John Cashman	6–8			
John Cashman:		21–26 (.447)			
George Jacobs (Independent) (1929–1936)
1929–30	George Jacobs	11–6			
1930–31	George Jacobs	7–13			
1931–32	George Jacobs	7–11			
1932–33	George Jacobs	9–4			
1933–34	George Jacobs	9–3			
1934–35	George Jacobs	13–7			
1935–36	George Jacobs	6–12			
George Jacobs:		62–56 (.525)			
Alexander Severance (Independent) (1936–1961)
1936–37	Alexander Severance	15–8			
1937–38	Alexander Severance	25–5			
1938–39	Alexander Severance	20–5			NCAA Final Four
1939–40	Alexander Severance	17–2			
1940–41	Alexander Severance	13–3			
1941–42	Alexander Severance	13–9			
1942–43	Alexander Severance	19–2			
1943–44	Alexander Severance	9–11			
1944–45	Alexander Severance	6–11			
1945–46	Alexander Severance	10–13			
1946–47	Alexander Severance	17–7			
1947–48	Alexander Severance	15–9			
1948–49	Alexander Severance	23–4			NCAA Elite Eight
1949–50	Alexander Severance	25–4			
1950–51	Alexander Severance	25–7			NCAA first round
1951–52	Alexander Severance	19–8			
1952–53	Alexander Severance	19–8			
1953–54	Alexander Severance	20–11			
1954–55	Alexander Severance	18–10			NCAA Sweet Sixteen
1955–56	Alexander Severance	14–12			
1956–57	Alexander Severance	10–15			
1957–58	Alexander Severance	12–11			
1958–59	Alexander Severance	18–7			NIT first round
1959–60	Alexander Severance	20–6			NIT quarterfinal
1960–61	Alexander Severance	11–13			
Alexander Severance:		413–201 (.673)			
Jack Kraft (Independent) (1961–1973)
1961–62	Jack Kraft	21–7			NCAA University Division Elite Eight
1962–63	Jack Kraft	19–10			NIT Fourth Place
1963–64	Jack Kraft	24–4			NCAA University Division Sweet Sixteen
1964–65	Jack Kraft	23–5			NIT Runner-up
1965–66	Jack Kraft	18–11			NIT Third Place
1966–67	Jack Kraft	17–9			NIT first round
1967–68	Jack Kraft	19–9			NIT quarterfinal
1968–69	Jack Kraft	21–5			NCAA University Division first round
1969–70	Jack Kraft	22–7			NCAA University Division Elite Eight
1970–71	Jack Kraft	27–7^{[Note A]}			NCAA University Division Runner-up
1971–72	Jack Kraft	20–8			NCAA University Division second round
1972–73	Jack Kraft	11–14			
Jack Kraft:		242–96 (.716)			
Rollie Massimino (Independent) (1974–1976)
1973–74	Rollie Massimino	7–19			
1974–75	Rollie Massimino	9–18			
1975–76	Rollie Massimino	16–11			
Rollie Massimino (Eastern Collegiate Basketball League/Eastern 8) (1976–1980)
1976–77	Rollie Massimino	23–10	6–1	2nd (East)	NIT Third Place
1977–78	Rollie Massimino	23–9	7–3	T–1st	NCAA Division I Elite Eight
1978–79	Rollie Massimino	15–13	9–1	1st	
1979–80	Rollie Massimino	23–8	7–3	T–1st	NCAA Division I second round
Rollie Massimino (Big East Conference) (1980–1992)
1980–81	Rollie Massimino	20–11	8–6	T–3rd	NCAA Division I second round
1981–82	Rollie Massimino	24–8	11–3	1st	NCAA Division I Elite Eight
1982–83	Rollie Massimino	24–8	12–4	T–1st	NCAA Division I Elite Eight
1983–84	Rollie Massimino	19–12	12–4	T–2nd	NCAA Division I second round
1984–85	Rollie Massimino	25–10	9–7	T–3rd	NCAA Division I Champion
1985–86	Rollie Massimino	23–14	10–6	4th	NCAA Division I second round
1986–87	Rollie Massimino	15–16	6–10	6th	NIT first round
1987–88	Rollie Massimino	24–13	9–7	T–3rd	NCAA Division I Elite Eight
1988–89	Rollie Massimino	18–16	7–9	T–5th	NIT quarterfinal
1989–90	Rollie Massimino	18–15	8–8	T–5th	NCAA Division I first round
1990–91	Rollie Massimino	17–15	7–9	T–7th	NCAA Division I second round
1991–92	Rollie Massimino	14–15	11–7	4th	NIT first round
Rollie Massimino:		357–241 (.597)	139–88 (.612)		
Steve Lappas (Big East Conference) (1992–2001)
1992–93	Steve Lappas	8–19	3–15	10th	
1993–94	Steve Lappas	20–12	10–8	T–4th	NIT Champion
1994–95	Steve Lappas	25–8	14–4	2nd	NCAA Division I first round
1995–96	Steve Lappas	26–7	14–4	2nd (BE6)	NCAA Division I second round
1996–97	Steve Lappas	24–10	12–6	T–1st (BE6)	NCAA Division I second round
1997–98	Steve Lappas	12–17	8–10	4th (BE6)	
1998–99	Steve Lappas	21–11	10–8	T–4th	NCAA Division I first round
1999–00	Steve Lappas	20–13	8–8	T–6th	NIT second round
2000–01	Steve Lappas	18–13	8–8	T–3rd (East)	NIT first round
Steve Lappas:		174–110 (.613)	87–71 (.551)		
Jay Wright (Big East Conference) (2001–2022)
2001–02	Jay Wright	19–13	7–9	5th (East)	NIT quarterfinal
2002–03	Jay Wright	15–16	8–8	T–3rd (East)	NIT first round
2003–04	Jay Wright	18–17	6–10	11th	NIT quarterfinal
2004–05	Jay Wright	24–8	11–5	T–3rd	NCAA Division I Sweet Sixteen
2005–06	Jay Wright	28–5	14–2	T–1st	NCAA Division I Elite Eight
2006–07	Jay Wright	22–11	9–7	7th	NCAA Division I first round
2007–08	Jay Wright	22–13	9–9	T–8th	NCAA Division I Sweet Sixteen
2008–09	Jay Wright	30–8	13–5	4th	NCAA Division I Final Four
2009–10	Jay Wright	25–8	13–5	T–2nd	NCAA Division I second round
2010–11	Jay Wright	21–12	9–9	T–9th	NCAA Division I second round
2011–12	Jay Wright	13–19	5–13	T–13th	
2012–13	Jay Wright	20–14	10–8	T–7th	NCAA Division I second round
2013–14	Jay Wright	29–5	16–2	1st	NCAA Division I third round
2014–15	Jay Wright	33–3	16–2	1st	NCAA Division I third round
2015–16	Jay Wright	35–5	16–2	1st	NCAA Division I Champion
2016–17	Jay Wright	32–4	15–3	1st	NCAA Division I second round
2017–18	Jay Wright	36–4	14–4	2nd	NCAA Division I Champion
2018–19	Jay Wright	26–10	13–5	1st	NCAA Division I second round
2019–20	Jay Wright	24–7	13–5	T–1st	No postseason held
2020–21	Jay Wright	18–7	11–4	1st	NCAA Division I Sweet Sixteen
2021–22	Jay Wright	30–8	16–4	2nd	NCAA Division I Final Four
Jay Wright:		520–197 (.725)	244–123 (.665)		
Kyle Neptune (Big East Conference) (2022–2025)
2022–23	Kyle Neptune	17–17	10–10	T–6th	NIT First Round
2023–24	Kyle Neptune	18–16	10–10	T–6th	NIT First Round
2024–25	Kyle Neptune	19–14	11–9	6th	None, fired on March 15th
Kyle Neptune:		54–47 (.535)	31–29 (.517)		
Kevin Willard (Big East Conference) (2025–present)
2025–26	Kevin Willard	24–9	15–5	3rd	NCAA Division I first round
Kevin Willard:		24–9 (.727)	15–5 (.750)		
Total:					
National champion Postseason invitational champion Conference regular season champion Conference regular season and conference tournament champion Division regular season champion Division regular season and conference tournament champion Conference tournament champion

^A. Due to NCAA violations, Villanova vacated its 4–1 record in the NCAA Tournament that year
