= 1925–26 Syracuse Orangemen basketball team =

American college basketball season

1925–26 Syracuse Orangemen men's basketball
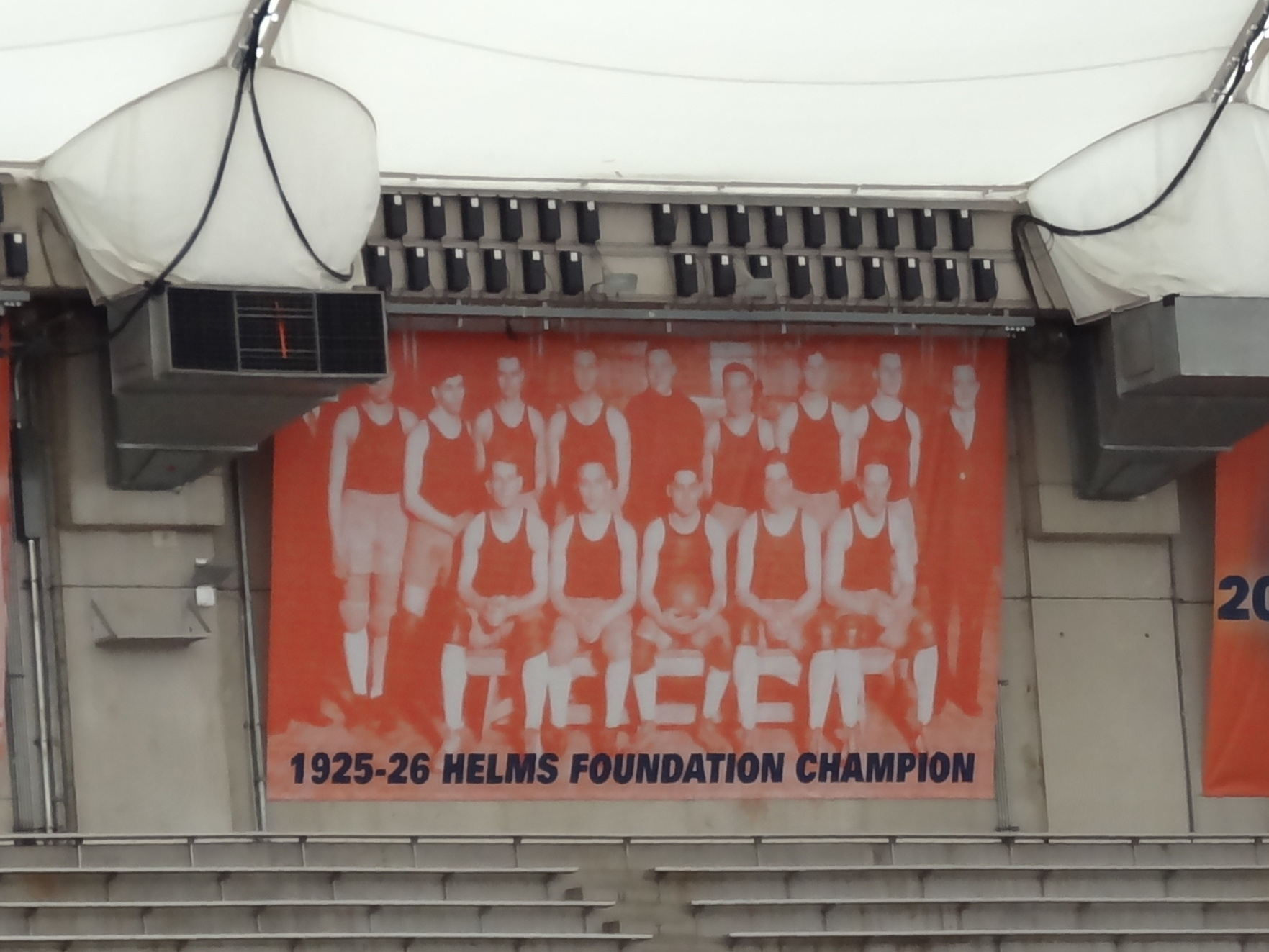

Helms Foundation National Champions
- Conference: Independent
- Record: 19–1
- Head coach: Lew Andreas (2nd season)
- Home arena: Archbold Gymnasium

The 1925–26 Syracuse Orangemen basketball team represented Syracuse University in intercollegiate basketball during the 1925–26 season. The team finished the season with a 19–1 record, was retroactively named the national champion by the Helms Athletic Foundation and was retroactively listed as the season's top team by the Premo-Porretta Power Poll. Vic Hanson was named an All-American for the second straight year.

== Schedule and results ==
Date time, TV	Rank^{#}	Opponent^{#}	Result	Record	Site city, state
Regular season
12/9/1925*		Hobart	W 34–10	1–0	Archbold Gymnasium; Syracuse, NY
12/12/1925*		Clarkson	W 61–14	2–0	Archbold Gymnasium; Syracuse, NY
12/16/1925*		Niagara	W 24–18	3–0	Archbold Gymnasium; Syracuse, NY
12/22/1925*		at Buffalo	W 29–25	4–0	Buffalo, NY
12/29/1925*		Penn	W 30–25	5–0	Archbold Gymnasium; Syracuse, NY
1/1/1926*		Princeton	W 32–17	6–0	Archbold Gymnasium; Syracuse, NY
1/6/1926*		at Cornell	W 34–23	7–0	Barton Hall; Ithaca, NY
1/9/1926*		Buffalo	W 24–23	8–0	Archbold Gymnasium; Syracuse, NY
1/16/1926*		NYU	W 40–20	9–0	Archbold Gymnasium; Syracuse, NY
1/20/1926*		Cornell	W 35–20	10–0	Archbold Gymnasium; Syracuse, NY
1/30/1926*		at Army	W 23–20	11–0	West Point, NY
2/4/1926*		Rutgers	W 42–25	12–0	Archbold Gymnasium; Syracuse, NY
2/6/1926*		Michigan	W 36–33	13–0	Archbold Gymnasium; Syracuse, NY
2/13/1926*		at Colgate	W 28–26	14–0	Hamilton, NY
2/19/1926*		Rochester	W 28–22	15–0	Archbold Gymnasium; Syracuse, NY
2/24/1926*		at Penn State	L 31–37	15–1	Armory; University Park, PA
2/26/1926*		at Rochester	W 30–22	16–1	Rochester, NY
3/3/1926*		St. Lawrence	W 24–18	17–1	Archbold Gymnasium; Syracuse, NY
3/6/1926*		Penn State	W 29–12	18–1	Archbold Gymnasium; Syracuse, NY
3/13/1926*		Colgate	W 29–12	19–1	Archbold Gymnasium; Syracuse, NY
*Non-conference game. ^{#}Rankings from AP Poll. (#) Tournament seedings in parentheses.
