= 1925–26 Georgia Bulldogs basketball team =

American college basketball team season

1925–26 Georgia Bulldogs basketball
- Conference: Southern Conference
- Record: 18–6 (9–4 SoCon)
- Head coach: Herman Stegeman (7th season)
- Captain: Nolen Richardson
- Home arena: Woodruff Hall

1925–26 Southern Conference men's basketball standings
| | Conf. | | | | Overall |
| Team | W | | L | PCT | W | | L | PCT |
|---|---|---|---|---|---|---|---|---|
| Kentucky | 8 | – | 0 | 1.000 | 15 | – | 3 | .833 |
| North Carolina† | 7 | – | 0 | 1.000 | 20 | – | 5 | .800 |
| Mississippi | 8 | – | 1 | .889 | 16 | – | 2 | .889 |
| Maryland | 7 | – | 1 | .875 | 14 | – | 3 | .824 |
| Georgia | 9 | – | 4 | .692 | 18 | – | 6 | .750 |
| South Carolina | 4 | – | 2 | .667 | 9 | – | 5 | .643 |
| NC State | 5 | – | 3 | .625 | 20 | – | 3 | .870 |
| Mississippi A&M | 5 | – | 3 | .625 | 14 | – | 8 | .636 |
| Tulane | 10 | – | 7 | .588 | 11 | – | 7 | .611 |
| Alabama | 6 | – | 6 | .500 | 10 | – | 11 | .476 |
| Virginia | 4 | – | 4 | .500 | 9 | – | 6 | .600 |
| LSU | 4 | – | 5 | .444 | 9 | – | 9 | .500 |
| VMI | 3 | – | 5 | .375 | 8 | – | 6 | .571 |
| Georgia Tech | 4 | – | 10 | .286 | 6 | – | 11 | .353 |
| Virginia Tech | 2 | – | 5 | .286 | 3 | – | 10 | .231 |
| Washington and Lee | 2 | – | 6 | .250 | 9 | – | 7 | .563 |
| Tennessee | 1 | – | 3 | .250 | 9 | – | 8 | .529 |
| Vanderbilt | 2 | – | 7 | .222 | 8 | – | 18 | .308 |
| Auburn | 1 | – | 7 | .125 | 5 | – | 10 | .333 |
| Clemson | 1 | – | 7 | .125 | 4 | – | 17 | .190 |
| Sewanee | 0 | – | 2 | .000 | 4 | – | 6 | .400 |
| Florida | 0 | – | 3 | .000 | 7 | – | 7 | .500 |
† Southern Conference Tournament winner

The 1925–26 Georgia Bulldogs basketball team represented the University of Georgia as a member of the Southern Conference (SoCon) during the 1925–26 NCAA men's basketball season. Led by seventh-year head coach Herman Stegeman, the Bulldogs compiled an overall record of 18–6 with a mark of 9–4 in conference play, placing fifth in the SoCon. The team captain was Nolen Richardson.

== Roster ==
1925–26 Georgia Bulldogs men's basketball team
Players
Coaches

| Pos. | # | Name | Height | Weight | Year | Previous school | Hometown |
|---|---|---|---|---|---|---|---|
| | | Nolen Richardson | — | — |
| | | George Keen | — | — |
| | | George Florence | — | — |
| | | Harrell Huguley | — | — |
| | | Walter Forbes | — | — |
| | | Mickey Frain | — | — |

Head coach

Herman Stegeman

Assistant coach(es)

Legend

- (C) Team captain
- (S) Suspended
- (I) Ineligible
- (W) Walk-on
- Injured
- Current redshirt

== Schedule ==
| Date time, TV | Opponent | Result | Record | Site city, state |
|---|---|---|---|---|
| | Macon YMCA | W 47-27 | 1–0 | Athens, GA |
| | Albany YMCA | W 57-28 | 2–0 | Athens, GA |
| | at Dahlonega | W 42-11 | 3–0 | Dahlonega, GA |
| | at Westminster A.C. | W 58-29 | 4–0 | |
| | at Ft. McPherson | W 61-21 | 5–0 | |
| | at Furman | W 43-34 | 6–0 | Greenville, SC |
| 1/8/1926 | at Georgia Tech | L 25-30 | 6–1 | Atlanta, GA |
| 1/12/1926 | Tulane | L 27-41 | 6–2 | New Orleans, LA |
| 1/15/1926 | at Washington & Lee | W 47-24 | 7–2 | Lexington, VA |
| 1/16/1926 | at VMI | W 30-22 | 8–2 | Lexington, VA |
| 1/18/1926 | at Virginia | L 31-41 | 8–3 | Charlottesville, VA |
| 1/21/1926 | South Carolina | W 57-32 | 9–3 | Athens, GA |
| 1/23/1926 | North Carolina State | W 26-25 | 10–3 | Athens, GA |
| 1/30/1926 | Georgia Tech | W 33-29 | 11–3 | Athens, GA |
| 2/3/1926 | at A.A.C. | L 26-34 | 11–4 | |
| 2/4/1926 | Auburn | W 49-28 | 12–4 | Athens, GA |
| 2/6/1926 | at Mercer | W 37-36 | 13–4 | Macon, GA |
| 2/10/1926 | Florida | W 55-27 | 14–4 | Athens, GA |
| 2/12/1926 | A.A.C. | W 36-33 | 15–4 | Athens, GA |
| 2/15/1926 | Kentucky | L 18-22 | 15–5 | Athens, GA |
| 2/20/1926 | at Georgia Tech | W 34-19 | 16–5 | Atlanta, GA |
| 2/22/1926 | Clemson | W 44-28 | 17–5 | Athens, GA |
| 2/26/1926 | Tennessee | W 48-25 | 18–5 | Athens, GA |
| 2/27/1926 | Kentucky | L 34-39 | 18–6 | Athens, GA |
*Non-conference game. (#) Tournament seedings in parentheses.
