= 1923–24 Mercer Bears men's basketball team =

American college basketball season

1923–24 Mercer Bears men's basketball

SIAA Champion
- Conference: Southern Intercollegiate Athletic Association
- Record: 22–6 (6–1 SIAA)
- Head coach: Tink Gillam

The 1923–24 Mercer Bears men's basketball team represented Mercer University in the 1923–24 NCAA men's basketball season. The team won the 1924 Southern Intercollegiate Athletic Association men's basketball tournament over Centre.
