= J. Craig Ruby =

American basketball player & coach (1896-1980)

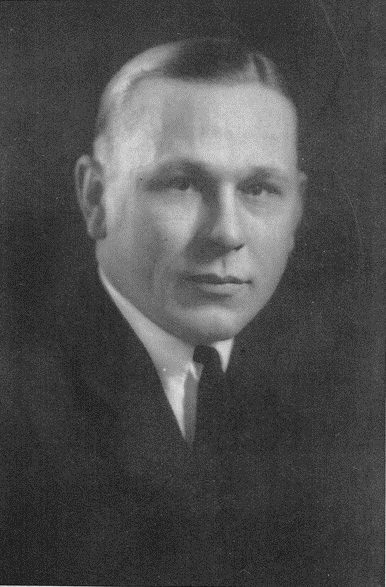
- Ruby from The Savitar, 1922

Biographical details
- Born: May 30, 1896; Stockport, Iowa, U.S.
- Died: September 9, 1980 (aged 84); Johnson County, Kansas, U.S.

Playing career
- 1917–1920: Missouri

Coaching career (HC unless noted)
- 1920–1922: Missouri
- 1922–1936: Illinois

Head coaching record
- Overall: 181–97

Accomplishments and honors

Championships
- 2 MVC (1921, 1922); 2 Big Ten (1924, 1935)

Awards
- 2× All-American – Helms (1918, 1919); 2× All-MVC (1919, 1920)

James Craig Ruby (May 30, 1896 – September 9, 1980) was an American college basketball player and coach. A two-time All-American and All-Missouri Valley Conference forward at the University of Missouri, he took over the head coaching position of his alma-mater in 1920. Ruby coached the Tigers for two seasons, compiling a record of 33 wins and only 2 losses. Both of Ruby's Missouri teams were retroactively listed as the top-ranked teams of the season by the Premo-Porretta Power Poll. Ruby was subsequently recruited by University of Illinois athletic director George Huff to take over the Fighting Illini’s men's basketball coaching duties.

Beginning in 1922 and continuing on for the next 14 years, Ruby compiled a record of 148 wins and 95 losses. While playing in the Big Ten Conference, Ruby's teams recorded 94 wins and 74 losses and won the conference championship 2 times. Ruby left the program in 1936 with coaching duties given to Douglas R. Mills.

Ruby and legendary Kansas coach Phog Allen actively campaigned together for higher baskets to offset the advantage of tall centers. He also advocated the elimination of the dribble to do away with stalling, and wanted the hoop enlarged to 20 inches in diameter rather than the standard 18. In 1930 Ruby served as the president of the National Association of Basketball Coaches (NABC).

Ruby retired from coaching to pursue a career with the Kansas City-based, Hallmark greeting card company at the age of 39. He died in 1980 in Johnson County, Kansas at the age of 84.

Ruby married Dorothy Whitney on August 11, 1924 in Chicago, Illinois. They had a daughter, Joyce, and son, Jay Whitney.

== Head coaching record ==
Record table
Season	Team	Overall	Conference	Standing	Postseason
Missouri Tigers (Missouri Valley Intercollegiate Athletic Association) (1920–1922)
1920–21	Missouri	17–1	17–1	1st	
1921–22	Missouri	16–1	15–1	T–1st	
Missouri:		33–2 (.943)	32–2 (.941)		
Illinois Fighting Illini (Big Ten Conference) (1922–1936)
1922–23	Illinois	9–6	7–5	T–4th	
1923–24	Illinois	11–6	8–4	T–1st	
1924–25	Illinois	11–6	8–4	T–3rd	
1925–26	Illinois	9–8	6–6	T–5th	
1926–27	Illinois	10–7	7–5	T–4th	
1927–28	Illinois	5–12	2–10	T–9th	
1928–29	Illinois	10–7	6–6	T–5th	
1929–30	Illinois	8–8	7–5	T–5th	
1930–31	Illinois	12–5	7–5	5th	
1931–32	Illinois	11–6	7–5	5th	
1932–33	Illinois	11–7	6–6	T–5th	
1933–34	Illinois	13–6	7–5	4th	
1934–35	Illinois	15–5	9–3	T–1st	
1935–36	Illinois	13–6	7–5	T–3rd	
Illinois:		148–95 (.609)	94–74 (.560)		
Total:		181–97 (.651)			
National champion Postseason invitational champion Conference regular season champion Conference regular season and conference tournament champion Division regular season champion Division regular season and conference tournament champion Conference tournament champion
