= David Connelly =

David Connelly may refer to:

- David V. Connelly (1898–1955), American baseball and basketball coach
- David Connelly (wrestler) (born 1968), Scottish wrestler
