= 1925 Southern Intercollegiate Athletic Association men's basketball tournament =

- Classification: Division I
- Teams: 8
- Champions: Mercer (3rd title)
- Winning coach: Tink Gillam (2nd title)
- Southern Intercollegiate Athletic Association men's basketball tournaments

The 1925 SIAA men's basketball tournament took place February 25–February 28, 1925. The Mercer Bears won their third Southern Intercollegiate Athletic Association title, led by head coach Tink Gillam.

== Bracket ==
Quarterfinals; February 25/26
Furman	30
Birmingham–Southern	38
The Citadel	30
Mississippi College	26
Chattanooga	25
Newberry	32
Mercer	31
Louisiana	21

Semifinals; February 26/27
Birmingham-Southern	24
The Citadel	42
Newberry	15
Mercer	38

Finals; February 28
The Citadel	24
Mercer	31

* Overtime game

=== Consolation game ===
February 28

Birmingham-Southern 25, Newberry 20

=== Championship ===
February 28

The Citadel 24, Mercer 31
Pts: Weeks 8	Pts: Green 12

Referees: Bernier

== See also ==
- List of SIAA basketball champions
