= 1925–26 Iowa State Cyclones men's basketball team =

American college basketball season

1925–26 Iowa State Cyclones men's basketball
- Conference: Missouri Valley Intercollegiate Athletic Association
- Record: 4–14 (3–11 MVIAA)
- Head coach: Bill Chandler (5th season)
- Home arena: State Gymnasium

1925–26 Missouri Valley Intercollegiate Athletic Association men's basketball standings
	Conf.				Overall
Team	W		L	PCT	W		L	PCT
Kansas	16	–	2	.889	16	–	2	.889
Oklahoma	9	–	3	.750	11	–	4	.733
Kansas State	9	–	3	.750	11	–	7	.611
Missouri	8	–	8	.500	8	–	10	.444
Nebraska	7	–	7	.500	8	–	10	.444
Drake	7	–	9	.438	9	–	9	.500
Washington University	7	–	9	.438	7	–	9	.438
Oklahoma A&M	5	–	7	.417	9	–	9	.500
Iowa State	3	–	11	.214	4	–	14	.222
Grinnell	1	–	13	.071	1	–	14	.067

The 1925–26 Iowa State Cyclones men's basketball team (also known informally as Ames) represented Iowa State University during the 1925–26 NCAA men's basketball season. The Cyclones were coached by Bill Chandler, who was in his fifth season with the Cyclones. They played their home games at the State Gymnasium in Ames, Iowa.

They finished the season 4–14, 3–11 in Missouri Valley Intercollegiate Athletic Association play to finish in ninth place.

== Roster ==
1925–26 Iowa State Cyclones men's basketball team
Players
Coaches

Pos.	#	Name	Height	Weight	Year	Hometown
		Ernest Anderson (C)	—	—
		Arnold	—	—
		Earl Elliott	—	—		Ames, Iowa
C		Herman Fennema	—	—		Monroe, Iowa
		Gregg	—	—
		L.W. Grimes	—	—
		V.S. Hall	—	—
		G.B. Hay	—	—
G		Freddy Kling	—	—
		Lester Lande	—	—		Northwood, Iowa
		Martin	—	—
		Aaron Miller	—	—		Waterloo, Iowa
		Nelson	—	—
		Max Stayer	—	—
		Swanson	—	—
		Wright	—	—

Head coach

- Bill Chandler

Assistant coach(es)

Legend

- (C) Team captain
- (S) Suspended
- (I) Ineligible
- (W) Walk-on
- Injured
- Current redshirt

== Schedule and results ==
Date time, TV	Rank^{#}	Opponent^{#}	Result	Record	Site city, state
Regular season
December 21, 1925*		Illinois	L 14–35	0–1	State Gymnasium; Ames, Iowa
December 28, 1925*		at Minnesota	L 17–32	0–2	Kenwood Armory; Minneapolis
December 30, 1925*; 8:00 pm		at Chicago	W 22–21	1–2	Bartlett Gymnasium; Chicago
January 2, 1926*		at Creighton	L 15–18	1–3	University Gym (1,500); Omaha, Nebraska
January 8, 1926; 7:15 pm		Drake; Iowa Big Four	L 18–26	1–4 (0–1)	State Gymnasium; Ames, Iowa
January 15, 1926		at Washington University (MO)	L 26–30	1–5 (0–2)	Francis Gymnasium (6,000); St. Louis, Missouri
January 16, 1926		at Missouri	W 23–22	2–5 (1–2)	Rothwell Gymnasium; Columbia, Missouri
January 23, 1926		at Nebraska	L 13–18	2–6 (1–3)	Nebraska Coliseum; Lincoln, Nebraska
January 29, 1926		Kansas	L 21–43	2–7 (1–4)	State Gymnasium; Ames, Iowa
February 1, 1926		Nebraska	L 12–27	2–8 (1–5)	State Gymnasium; Ames, Iowa
February 5, 1926; 8:00 pm		at Drake; Iowa Big Four	L 22–26	2–9 (1–6)	Des Moines Coliseum; Des Moines, Iowa
February 9, 1926		Grinnell	W 34–15	3–9 (2–6)	State Gymnasium; Ames, Iowa
February 13, 1926		at Kansas State	L 10–43	3–10 (2–7)	Nichols Hall; Manhattan, Kansas
February 15, 1926		at Kansas	L 23–25	3–11 (2–8)	Robinson Gymnasium; Lawrence, Kansas
February 22, 1926		at Grinnell	W 32–23	4–11 (3–8)	Grinnell, Iowa
February 26, 1926		Missouri	L 21–34	4–12 (3–9)	State Gymnasium; Ames, Iowa
February 27, 1926		Washington University (MO)	L 20–24	4–13 (3–10)	State Gymnasium; Ames, Iowa
March 4, 1926		Kansas State	L 22–23 ^{OT}	4–14 (3–11)	State Gymnasium; Ames, Iowa
*Non-conference game. ^{#}Rankings from AP poll. (#) Tournament seedings in parentheses. All times are in Central Time.
