= The Citadel Bulldogs basketball, 1920–1929 =

The Citadel Bulldogs basketball teams represented The Citadel, The Military College of South Carolina in Charleston, South Carolina, United States. The program was established in 1900–01, and has continuously fielded a team since 1912–13. Their primary rivals are College of Charleston, Furman and VMI.

== 1919–20 ==
1919–20 The Citadel Bulldogs men's basketball
- Conference: Independent
- Record: 11–0
- Head coach: C. F. Myers

Date time, TV	Opponent	Result	Record	Site city, state
January 17	Ashley Athletic Club	W 54–4	1–0	Charleston, SC
January 22	at South Carolina	W 19–8	2–0	Columbia, SC
	Furman	W 22–16	3–0	
January 23	at Newberry	W 19–10	4–0	Newberry, SC
January 24	at Presbyterian	W 31–22	5–0	Clinton, SC
January 26	Camp Jackson	W 31–22	6–0	Charleston, SC
	Furman	W 19–16	7–0	
January 31	College of Charleston	W 41–11	8–0	Charleston, SC
February 15	Camp Jackson	W 48–25	9–0	Charleston, SC
February 27	South Carolina	W 34–22	10–0	Charleston, SC
March 6	Trinity	W 36–25	11–0	Charleston, SC
*Non-conference game. (#) Tournament seedings in parentheses. All times are in Eastern Time.

== 1920–21 ==
1920–21 The Citadel Bulldogs men's basketball
- Conference: Southern Intercollegiate Athletic Association
- Record: 8–7 ( SIAA)
- Head coach: C. F. Myers

Date time, TV	Opponent	Result	Record	Site city, state
January 16*	College of Charleston	W 55–15	1–0	Charleston, SC
January 22*	Newberry	W 32–17	2–0	Charleston, SC
January 24*	at Virginia Tech	L 10–35	2–1	Blacksburg, VA
January 25*	at Washington and Lee	L 15–29	2–2	Lexington, VA
January 26*	at VMI	L 8–71	2–3	Lexington, VA
January 27*	at Virginia	L 15–51	2–4	Charlottesville, VA
February 8*	at South Carolina	L 13–22	2–5	Columbia, SC
February 9*	at Furman	W 28–11	3–5	Greenville, SC
February 10*	at Wofford	L 21–22	3–6	Spartanburg, SC
February 11*	at Newberry	L 20–38	3–7	Newberry, SC
February 19*	Clemson	W 28–26	4–7	Charleston, SC
February 21*	Wofford	W 21–19	5–7	Charleston, SC
February 26*	Presbyterian	W 21–11	6–7	Charleston, SC
March 5*	Furman	W 31–21	7–7	Charleston, SC
March 12*	South Carolina	W 27–15	8–7	Charleston, SC
*Non-conference game. (#) Tournament seedings in parentheses. All times are in Eastern Time.

== 1921–22 ==
1921–22 The Citadel Bulldogs men's basketball
- Conference: Southern Intercollegiate Athletic Association
- Record: 7–5 ( SIAA)
- Head coach: C. F. Myers

Date time, TV	Opponent	Result	Record	Site city, state
January 21*	Newberry	W 22–19	1–0	Charleston, SC
January 28*	Clemson	W 29–8	2–0	Charleston, SC
February 4*	Furman	W 36–31	3–0	Charleston, SC
February 10*	Wofford	W 32–25	4–0	Charleston, SC
February 13*	at South Carolina	L 17–18	4–1	Columbia, SC
February 14*	at Clemson	L 19–20	4–2	Calhoun, SC
February 15*	at Newberry	L 22–35	4–3	Newberry, SC
February 16*	at Furman	L 20–30	4–4	Greenville, SC
February 17*	at Wofford	W 28–27	5–4	Spartanburg, SC
February 21*	College of Charleston	W 31–13	6–4	Charleston, SC
February 24*	vs. Vanderbilt; 1922 SIAA tournament	L 22–37	6–5	Atlanta, GA
March 4*	South Carolina	W 29–16	7–5	Charleston, SC
*Non-conference game. (#) Tournament seedings in parentheses. All times are in Eastern Time.

== 1922–23 ==
1922–23 The Citadel Bulldogs men's basketball
- Conference: Southern Intercollegiate Athletic Association
- Record: 5–5 ( SIAA)
- Head coach: C. F. Myers

Date time, TV	Opponent	Result	Record	Site city, state
January 13*	South Carolina	L 17–22	0–1	Charleston, SC
January 26*	Newberry	L 21–32	0–2	Charleston, SC
February 3*	Presbyterian	W 37–18	1–2	Charleston, SC
February 5*	at South Carolina	L 10–34	1–3	Columbia, SC
February 6*	at Newberry	W 46–10	2–3	Newberry, SC
February 7*	at Furman	L 23–31	2–4	Greenville, SC
February 8*	at Spartanburg YMCA	L 18–40	2–5	Spartanburg, SC
February 9*	at Presbyterian	W 20–19	3–5	Clinton, SC
February 17*	Furman	W 34–25	4–5	Charleston, SC
February 24*	College of Charleston	W 32–14	5–5	Charleston, SC
*Non-conference game. (#) Tournament seedings in parentheses. All times are in Eastern Time.

== 1923–24 ==
1923–24 The Citadel Bulldogs men's basketball
- Conference: Southern Intercollegiate Athletic Association
- Record: 2–8 ( SIAA)
- Head coach: C. F. Myers

Date time, TV	Opponent	Result	Record	Site city, state
January 12*	South Carolina	L 24–26	0–1	Charleston, SC
January 26*	Newberry	L 13–20	0–2	Charleston, SC
February 2*	Wofford	W 27–22	1–2	Charleston, SC
February 4*	at South Carolina	L 18–26	1–3	Columbia, SC
February 5*	at Newberry	L 16–35	1–4	Newberry, SC
February 6*	at Presbyterian	L 23–32	1–5	Clinton, SC
February 7*	at Wofford	W 27–13	2–5	Spartanburg, SC
February 8*	at Furman	L 11–39	2–6	Greenville, SC
February 16*	Presbyterian	L 10–19	2–7	Charleston, SC
February 23*	Furman	L 16–28	2–8	Charleston, SC
*Non-conference game. (#) Tournament seedings in parentheses. All times are in Eastern Time.

== 1924–25 ==
1924–25 The Citadel Bulldogs men's basketball
- Conference: Southern Intercollegiate Athletic Association
- Record: 11–2 ( SIAA)
- Head coach: C. F. Myers

With season sweeps of Clemson, Furman, and Wofford, a win in their only matchup with Presbyterian and a season split with South Carolina, the Bulldogs claim a South Carolina "state championship" for the 1924–25 season.

Date time, TV	Opponent	Result	Record	Site city, state
January 13*	Standard Oil	W 46–18	1–0	Charleston, SC
January 24*	South Carolina	W 46–18	2–0	Charleston, SC
January 31*	Clemson	W 34–18	3–0	Charleston, SC
February 7*	Furman	W 38–32	4–0	Charleston, SC
February 10*	at South Carolina	L 29–32	4–1	Columbia, SC
February 11*	at Wofford	W 27–25	5–1	Spartanburg, SC
February 12*	at Furman	W 44–24	6–1	Greenville, SC
February 13*	at Clemson	W 25–21	7–1	Riggs Field House; Calhoun, SC
February 14*	Presbyterian	W 52–30	8–1	Charleston, SC
February 21*	Wofford	W 45–20	9–1	Charleston, SC
February 24*	Ole Miss	W 30–26	10–1	Charleston, SC
1925 SIAA tournament
February 27	vs. Birmingham–Southern	W 42–24	11–1	Atlanta, GA
February 28	vs. Mercer	L 24–31	11–2	Atlanta, GA
*Non-conference game. (#) Tournament seedings in parentheses. All times are in Eastern Time.

== 1925–26 ==
1925–26 The Citadel Bulldogs men's basketball
- Conference: Southern Intercollegiate Athletic Association
- Record: 9–6 ( SIAA)
- Head coach: Locke Brown

Date time, TV	Opponent	Result	Record	Site city, state
January 9*	College of Charleston	W 29–20	1–0	Charleston, SC
January 16*	South Carolina	W 42–24	2–0	Charleston, SC
January 30*	Presbyterian	W 36–29	3–0	Charleston, SC
February 6*	Furman	W 36–29	4–0	Charleston, SC
February 11*	at South Carolina	L 20–28	4–1	Columbia, SC
February 12*	at Clemson	W 26–23	5–1	Calhoun, SC
February 13*	at Oglethorpe	W 30–22	6–1	Atlanta, GA
February 15*	at Chattanooga	L 30–36	6–2	Chattanooga, TN
February 16*	at Mercer	L 32–35	6–3	Macon, GA
February 22*	Wofford	L 28–33	6–4	Charleston, SC
February 27*	at Davidson	W 39–37	7–4	Alumni Gymnasium; Davidson, NC
March 1*	at Furman	L 22–32	7–5	Greenville, SC
1926 SIAA tournament
March 4	vs. Newberry	W 37–19	8–5	Greenville, SC
March 5	vs. Furman	W 36–26	9–5	Greenville, SC
March 6	vs. Mississippi College	L 23–41	9–6	Greenville, SC
*Non-conference game. (#) Tournament seedings in parentheses. All times are in Eastern Time.

== 1927–28 ==
1927–28 The Citadel Bulldogs men's basketball
- Conference: Southern Intercollegiate Athletic Association
- Record: 13–5 ( SIAA)
- Head coach: Benny Blatt

Date time, TV	Opponent	Result	Record	Site city, state
January 6*	Parris Island Marines	W 51–44	1–0	Charleston, SC
January 14*	South Carolina	W 47–28	2–0	Charleston, SC
January 19*	at Savannah Athletic Club	W 47–31	3–0	Savannah, GA
January 20*	at Mercer	L 29–38	3–1	Macon, GA
January 21*	at Mercer	L 15–33	3–2	Macon, GA
January 27*	Oglethorpe	W 53–36	4–2	Charleston, SC
January 28*	Furman	W 42–41	5–2	Charleston, SC
February 4*	at Presbyterian	W 53–30	6–2	Charleston, SC
February 10*	Newberry	W 48–23	7–2	Charleston, SC
February 11*	Davidson	W 39–30	8–2	Charleston, SC
February 13	at South Carolina	L 26–32	8–3	Columbia, SC
February 14*	at Wofford	W 39–27	9–3	Spartanburg, SC
February 15*	at Furman	L 22–59	9–4	Greenville, SC
February 16*	at Newberry	W 27–25	10–4	Newberry, SC
February 17*	at Presbyterian	W 56–48	11–4	Clinton, SC
February 21*	Wofford	W 69–32	12–4	Charleston, SC
February 24*	College of Charleston	W 47–34	13–4	Charleston, SC
1928 SIAA tournament
March 1	vs. Birmingham–Southern	L 34–35	13–5	Chattanooga, TN
*Non-conference game. (#) Tournament seedings in parentheses. All times are in Eastern Time.

== 1928–29 ==
1928–29 The Citadel Bulldogs men's basketball
- Conference: Southern Intercollegiate Athletic Association
- Record: 12–4 ( SIAA)
- Head coach: Benny Blatt

Date time, TV	Opponent	Result	Record	Site city, state
January 5*	Erskine	W 40–36	1–0	Charleston, SC
January 12*	South Carolina	W 47–36	2–0	Charleston, SC
January 14*	Clemson	W 40–37	3–0	Charleston, SC
January 25*	Mercer	L 35–41	3–1	Charleston, SC
January 26*	Mercer	L 29–52	3–2	Charleston, SC
February 2*	Presbyterian	W 41–30	4–2	Charleston, SC
February 8*	Newberry	W 42–27	5–2	Charleston, SC
February 9*	College of Charleston	W 26–15	6–2	Charleston, SC
February 13*	at South Carolina	W 51–40	7–2	Columbia, SC
February 14*	at Newberry	W 35–28	8–2	Newberry, SC
February 15*	at Presbyterian	W 51–31	9–2	Clinton, SC
February 16*	at Clemson	L 33–35	9–3	Riggs Field House; Calhoun, SC
February 18*	at Furman	L 24–37	9–4	Greenville, SC
February 19*	at Wofford	W 32–18	10–4	Spartanburg, SC
February 21*	at Wofford	W 38–15	11–4	Charleston, SC
February 22*	Furman	W 54–38	12–4	Charleston, SC
*Non-conference game. (#) Tournament seedings in parentheses. All times are in Eastern Time.
