= 1924–25 Mercer Bears men's basketball team =

American college basketball season

1924–25 Mercer Bears men's basketball

SIAA Champion
- Conference: Southern Intercollegiate Athletic Association
- Record: 14–6 ( SIAA)
- Head coach: Tink Gillam

The 1924–25 Mercer Bears men's basketball team represented Mercer University in the 1924–25 NCAA men's basketball season. The team won the 1925 Southern Intercollegiate Athletic Association men's basketball tournament. Coach Tink Gillam's back-to-back conference titles earned him the nickname "the Napoleon of Southern basketball".
