= 1924 Southern Intercollegiate Athletic Association men's basketball tournament =

- Classification: Division I
- Teams: 13
- Champions: Mercer (2nd title)
- Winning coach: Tink Gillam (1st title)
- Southern Intercollegiate Athletic Association men's basketball tournaments

The 1924 SIAA men's basketball tournament took place February 25–February 28, 1924, at . The Mercer Bears won their second Southern Intercollegiate Athletic Association title, led by head coach Tink Gillam.

== Bracket ==
First round February 25
Mercer	21
Millsaps	18
Louisiana	28
Presbyterian	24
Wofford	24
Howard	23
Mississippi College	31
Birmingham–Southern	10
Furman
Bye
Newberry	46
Georgetown	19
Centre
Bye
Chattanooga
Bye

Quarterfinals; February 26
Mercer	39
Louisiana	23
Wofford	32
Mississippi College	42
Furman	23
Newberry	24
Centre	27
Chattanooga	25

Semifinals; February 27
Mercer	27
Mississippi College	21
Newberry	21
Centre	30

Finals; February 28
Mercer	32
Centre	20

=== Championship ===
February 28

Mercer 32, Centre 20

== See also ==
- List of SIAA basketball champions
