= 1926 Southern Conference men's basketball tournament =

- Classification: Division I
- Teams: 16
- Site: Municipal Auditorium; Atlanta, GA
- Champions: North Carolina Tar Heels (4th title)
- Winning coach: Harlan Sanborn (1st title)

1925–26 Southern Conference men's basketball standings
	Conf.				Overall
Team	W		L	PCT	W		L	PCT
Kentucky	8	–	0	1.000	15	–	3	.833
North Carolina†	7	–	0	1.000	20	–	5	.800
Mississippi	8	–	1	.889	16	–	2	.889
Maryland	7	–	1	.875	14	–	3	.824
Georgia	9	–	4	.692	18	–	6	.750
South Carolina	4	–	2	.667	9	–	5	.643
NC State	5	–	3	.625	20	–	3	.870
Mississippi A&M	5	–	3	.625	14	–	8	.636
Tulane	10	–	7	.588	11	–	7	.611
Alabama	6	–	6	.500	10	–	11	.476
Virginia	4	–	4	.500	9	–	6	.600
LSU	4	–	5	.444	9	–	9	.500
VMI	3	–	5	.375	8	–	6	.571
Georgia Tech	4	–	10	.286	6	–	11	.353
Virginia Tech	2	–	5	.286	3	–	10	.231
Washington and Lee	2	–	6	.250	9	–	7	.563
Tennessee	1	–	3	.250	9	–	8	.529
Vanderbilt	2	–	7	.222	8	–	18	.308
Auburn	1	–	7	.125	5	–	10	.333
Clemson	1	–	7	.125	4	–	17	.190
Sewanee	0	–	2	.000	4	–	6	.400
Florida	0	–	3	.000	7	–	7	.500
† Southern Conference Tournament winner

The 1926 Southern Conference men's basketball tournament took place from February 26–March 2, 1926, at Municipal Auditorium in Atlanta, Georgia. The North Carolina Tar Heels won their fourth Southern Conference title, led by head coach Harlan Sanborn. Jack Cobb was Helms Foundation College Basketball Player of the Year.

== Bracket ==
First round February 26
North Carolina	52
Clemson	21
Virginia	29
Tulane	25
Alabama	27
Georgia Tech	30
Sewanee	16
Mississippi	50
Kentucky	32
VMI	25
Tennessee	25
Georgia	48
NC State	32
Auburn	27
Mississippi A&M	22
Maryland	19

Quarterfinals; February 27
North Carolina	25
Virginia	23
Georgia Tech	24
Mississippi	35
Kentucky	39
Georgia	34
NC State	29
Mississippi A&M	32

Semifinals; March 1
North Carolina	38
Mississippi	23
Kentucky	26
Mississippi A&M	31

Finals; March 2
North Carolina	37
Mississippi A&M	23

* Overtime game

=== Championship ===
March 2

North Carolina 37, Mississippi A&M 23
Pts: Jack Cobb 19	Pts: W. B. Ricks 8

Municipal Auditorium, Atlanta, Georgia
Referees: Sutton

== All-Southern tournament team ==
Player	Position	Class	Team
Arthur Newcombe	G	Senior	North Carolina
Bunn Hackney	G	Junior	North Carolina
Jack Cobb	F	Senior	North Carolina
Earl Johnson	F	Senior	Mississippi
H. L. Stone	C	Junior	Mississippi A&M

== See also ==
- List of Southern Conference men's basketball champions
