= 1925–26 Kansas Jayhawks men's basketball team =

American college basketball season

1925–26 Kansas Jayhawks men's basketball

MVIAA Champions
- Conference: Missouri Valley Intercollegiate Athletic Association
- Record: 16–2 (16–2 MVIAA)
- Head coach: Phog Allen (9th season)
- Assistant coach: John Bunn (5th season)
- Captain: Wilferd Belgard
- Home arena: Robinson Gymnasium

1925–26 Missouri Valley Intercollegiate Athletic Association men's basketball standings
	Conf.				Overall
Team	W		L	PCT	W		L	PCT
Kansas	16	–	2	.889	16	–	2	.889
Oklahoma	9	–	3	.750	11	–	4	.733
Kansas State	9	–	3	.750	11	–	7	.611
Missouri	8	–	8	.500	8	–	10	.444
Nebraska	7	–	7	.500	8	–	10	.444
Drake	7	–	9	.438	9	–	9	.500
Washington University	7	–	9	.438	7	–	9	.438
Oklahoma A&M	5	–	7	.417	9	–	9	.500
Iowa State	3	–	11	.214	4	–	14	.222
Grinnell	1	–	13	.071	1	–	14	.067

The 1925–26 Kansas Jayhawks men's basketball team represented the University of Kansas during the 1925–26 college men's basketball season.

== Roster ==
- Wilferd Belgard
- Glenn Burton
- Clifford Campbell
- William Crosswhite
- Fred Daniels
- Gale Gordon
- James Hill
- Gregory Hodges
- Leo Lattin
- Albert Peterson
- Herbert Proudfit
- Harold Schmidt
- Harold Zuber

== Schedule ==
Date time, TV	Rank^{#}	Opponent^{#}	Result	Record	Site city, state
January 11		Washington University (MO)	L 18–25	0-1 (0-1)	Robinson Gymnasium; Lawrence, KS
January 13		at Kansas State; Sunflower Showdown	W 25–16	1-1 (1-1)	Nichols Hall; Manhattan, KS
January 14		Grinnell	W 28–20	2-1 (2-1)	Robinson Gymnasium; Lawrence, KS
January 21		Oklahoma	L 21–29	2-2 (2-2)	Robinson Gymnasium; Lawrence, KS
January 23		Missouri; Border War	W 24–15	3-2 (3-2)	Robinson Gymnasium; Lawrence, KS
January 28		at Grinnell	W 36–19	4-2 (4-2)	Grinnell, IA
January 29		at Iowa State	W 43–21	5-2 (5-2)	State Gymnasium; Ames, IA
January 30		at Drake	W 28–24	6-2 (6-2)	Des Moines Coliseum; Des Moines, IA
February 6		at Nebraska	W 25–14	7-2 (7-2)	Nebraska Coliseum; Lincoln, NE
February 9		Drake	W 34–18	8-2 (8-2)	Robinson Gymnasium; Lawrence, KS
February 11		Oklahoma A&M	W 38–18	9-2 (9-2)	Robinson Gymnasium; Lawrence, KS
February 15		Iowa State	W 35–23	10-2 (10-2)	Robinson Gymnasium; Lawrence, KS
February 19		at Oklahoma A&M	W 47–30	11-2 (11-2)	Armory-Gymnasium; Stillwater, OK
February 20		at Oklahoma	W 29–21	12-2 (12-2)	Norman, OK
February 23		at Missouri; Border War	W 27–22	13-2 (13-2)	Rothwell Gymnasium; Columbia, MO
February 24		at Washington University (MO)	W 29–22	14-2 (14-2)	Francis Gymnasium; St. Louis, MO
February 27		Nebraska	W 30–17	15-2 (15-2)	Robinson Gymnasium; Lawrence, KS
March 1		Kansas State; Sunflower Showdown	W 34–29	16-2 (16-2)	Robinson Gymnasium; Lawrence, KS
*Non-conference game. ^{#}Rankings from AP Poll. (#) Tournament seedings in parentheses.
