= 1925–26 Wisconsin Badgers men's basketball team =

American college basketball season

1925–26 Wisconsin Badgers men's basketball
- Conference: Big Ten Conference
- Record: 8–9 (4–8 Big Ten)
- Head coach: Walter Meanwell
- Home arena: Red Gym

1925–26 Big Ten Conference men's basketball standings
	Conf.				Overall
Team	W		L	PCT	W		L	PCT
Purdue	8	–	4	.667	13	–	4	.765
Indiana	8	–	4	.667	12	–	5	.706
Iowa	8	–	4	.667	12	–	5	.706
Michigan	8	–	4	.667	12	–	5	.706
Illinois	6	–	6	.500	9	–	8	.529
Ohio State	6	–	6	.500	10	–	7	.588
Minnesota	5	–	7	.417	7	–	10	.412
Wisconsin	4	–	8	.333	8	–	9	.471
Northwestern	4	–	8	.333	5	–	11	.313
Chicago	3	–	9	.250	5	–	12	.294

The 1925–26 Wisconsin Badgers men's basketball team represented University of Wisconsin–Madison. The head coach was Walter Meanwell, coaching his twelfth season with the Badgers. The team played their home games at the Red Gym in Madison, Wisconsin and was a member of the Big Ten Conference.

== Schedule ==
Date time, TV	Rank^{#}	Opponent^{#}	Result	Record	Site city, state
Regular Season
12/07/1925*		North Dakota State	L 11–16	0–1	Red Gym; Madison, WI
12/12/1925*		South Dakota State	W 48–9	1–1	Red Gym; Madison, WI
12/18/1925*		at Marquette	W 42–26	2–1	Marquette Gymnasium; Milwaukee, WI
1/02/1926*		DePauw (IN)	W 32–31	3–1	Red Gym; Madison, WI
1/05/1926		Minnesota	W 36–24	4–1 (1–0)	Red Gym; Madison, WI
1/11/1926		Indiana	W 33–31	5–1 (2–0)	Red Gym; Madison, WI
1/16/1926		Chicago	L 15–17	5–2 (2–1)	Red Gym; Madison, WI
1/23/1926		Northwestern	W 35–27	6–2 (3–1)	Red Gym; Madison, WI
2/05/1926*		Butler	W 31-24	7–2	Red Gym; Madison, WI
2/13/1926		at Chicago	W 26–23	8–2 (4–1)	Bartlett Gymnasium; Chicago, IL
2/16/1926		at Northwestern	L 26–36	8–3 (4–2)	Patten Gymnasium; Evanston, IL
2/20/1926		Purdue	L 21–29	8–4 (4–3)	Red Gym; Madison, WI
2/22/1926		at Michigan	L 13–22	8–5 (4–4)	Fielding H. Yost Fieldhouse; Ann Arbor, MI
2/26/1926		at Purdue	L 31–32	8–6 (4–5)	Memorial Gymnasium; West Lafayette, IN
3/01/1926		Michigan	L 23–24 ^{OT}	8–7 (4–6)	Red Gym; Madison, WI
3/05/1926		at Minnesota	L 19–31	8–8 (4–7)	Minnesota Armory; Minneapolis, MN
3/09/1926		at Indiana	L 20–35	8–9 (4–8)	Men's Gymnasium; Bloomington, IN
*Non-conference game. ^{#}Rankings from AP Poll. (#) Tournament seedings in parentheses.
