= 1925–26 Duke Blue Devils men's basketball team =

American college basketball season

1925–26 Duke Blue Devils men's basketball
- Conference: Independent
- Record: 8–12
- Head coach: George Buchheit (2nd season)
- Captain: Pete Moss
- Home arena: Alumni Memorial Gymnasium

The 1925–26 Duke Blue Devils men's basketball team represented Duke University during the 1922–23 men's college basketball season. The head coach was George Buchheit, coaching his second season with the Blue Devils. The team finished with an overall record of 8–12.

== Schedule ==
| Date time, TV | Opponent | Result | Record | Site city, state |
|---|---|---|---|---|
| * | Durham YMCA | L 25–30 | 0–1 | |
| * | Duke Alumni | W 44–29 | 1–1 | |
| * | Durham YMCA | W 34–31 | 2–1 | |
| * | Furman | W 28–18 | 3–1 | |
| * | South Carolina | W 36–30 | 4–1 | |
| * | Clemson | W 46–12 | 5–1 | |
| * | Wake Forest | L 24–27 | 5–2 | |
| * l | N.C. State | L 27–28 | 5–3 | |
| * | Lynchburg | W 36–31 | 6–3 | |
| * | Wake Forest | L 18–33 | 6–4 | |
| * | Lynchburg | W 29–27 | 7–4 | |
| * | George Washington | L 32–42 | 7–5 | |
| * | Maryland | L 20–40 | 7–6 | |
| * | Richmond | L 30–42 | 7–7 | |
| * | Davidson | W 32–30 | 8–7 | |
| 1/8/1926* | Davidson | L 31–32 | 8–8 | |
| 1/26/1926* | at North Carolina | L 22–38 | 8–9 | Chapel Hill, NC |
| 1/30/1926* | N.C. State | L 24–32 | 8–10 | |
| 2/1/1926* | Guilford | L 30–35 | 8–11 | |
| 2/20/1926* | North Carolina | L 21–44 | 8–12 | Durham, NC |
*Non-conference game. (#) Tournament seedings in parentheses.
