= 1925–26 Illinois Fighting Illini men's basketball team =

American college basketball season

1925–26 Illinois Fighting Illini men's basketball
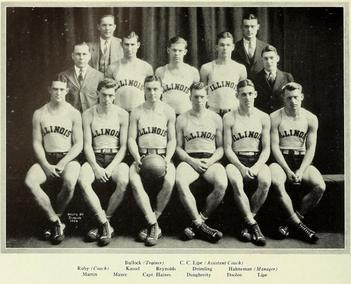
- Conference: Big Ten Conference
- Record: 9–8 (6–6 Big Ten)
- Head coach: J. Craig Ruby (4th season)
- Assistant coach: Jack Lipe (2nd season)
- Captain: Leonard Haines
- Home arena: Huff Hall

1925–26 Big Ten Conference men's basketball standings
	Conf.				Overall
Team	W		L	PCT	W		L	PCT
Purdue	8	–	4	.667	13	–	4	.765
Indiana	8	–	4	.667	12	–	5	.706
Iowa	8	–	4	.667	12	–	5	.706
Michigan	8	–	4	.667	12	–	5	.706
Illinois	6	–	6	.500	9	–	8	.529
Ohio State	6	–	6	.500	10	–	7	.588
Minnesota	5	–	7	.417	7	–	10	.412
Wisconsin	4	–	8	.333	8	–	9	.471
Northwestern	4	–	8	.333	5	–	11	.313
Chicago	3	–	9	.250	5	–	12	.294

The 1925–26 Illinois Fighting Illini men's basketball team represented the University of Illinois.

== Regular season ==
Craig Ruby began the 1925–26 season with a Fighting Illini team had eight returning letterman from a team that placed in a tie for third place a year earlier. This team finished in a tie for fifth place in the Big Ten. Probably the greatest change for the Illini during this season was the opening of their new home, Huff Gymnasium. Originally named New Gymnasium, Huff Gymnasium was renamed in 1937 after George Huff, who was the school's athletic director from 1895 to 1935, Huff Gymnasium was home to the Fighting Illini's men's basketball program until 1963. The starting lineup included captain Leonard Haines and Kenneth Reynolds at guard, John Mauer at center and Jack Lipe, Russell Daugherity and Hollie Martin at forward.

=== Roster ===
1925–26 Illinois Fighting Illini men's basketball team
Players
Coaches

Pos.	#	Name	Height	Weight	Year	Hometown
G	1	Leonard Haines (C)	—	—	Sr	Belvidere, Illinois
F	2	John Mauer	—	—	Sr	Batavia, Illinois
F	3	Russell Daugherity	—	—	Jr	Streator, Illinois
F	4	Hollie Martin	—	—	Sr	Perrysville, Indiana
G	5	Chas Kassel	—	—	Jr	Melrose Park, Illinois
G	6	Kenneth L. Reynolds	—	—	Jr	Villa Grove, Illinois
G	7	Jack Lipe	—	—	Sr	Decatur, Illinois
F	8	Keston Deimling	—	—	So	Stevens Point, Wisconsin
F	9	Byran Doolen	—	—	Sr	Kinmundy, Illinois
F	10	Marion Leonard	—	—	Jr	Forrest, Illinois
G	11	James R. "Bud" Stewart	—	—	So	Flint, Michigan
G	12	Robert McKay	—	—	Jr	Champaign, Illinois
F	14	Ralph Waldo Freeman	—	—	Sr	Ogden, Illinois
F	15	George Rea	—	—	Jr	Urbana, Illinois
G	16	Roy Mayberry	—	—	So	Norwalk, Ohio
G	17	Louis Cotie	—	—	So	Muskegon, Michigan
F	R	Werner Daib	—	—	So	Chicago, Illinois
F	R	Arthur Osgood	—	—	So	Marseilles, Illinois
G	R	Daniel Weeks Vittum	—	—	So	Canton, Illinois

Head coach

- Craig Ruby (University of Missouri) (4th year)

Assistant coach(es)

- Jack Lipe (Player/Coach)

Legend

- (C) Team captain
- (S) Suspended
- (I) Ineligible
- (W) Walk-on
- Injured
- Current redshirt

Roster

== Schedule ==
Date time, TV	Rank^{#}	Opponent^{#}	Result	Record	Site (attendance) city, state
Non-Conference regular season
12/12/1925*		Butler	W 23–22	1-0	New Gymnasium; Champaign, IL
12/19/1925*		at Drake	L 16–20	1-1	Des Moines Coliseum; Des Moines, IA
12/21/1925*		at Iowa Agricultural College	W 33–14	2-1	State Gymnasium; Ames, IA
1/4/1926*		Kansas Aggies	W 30–29	3-1	New Gymnasium; Champaign, IL
Big Ten regular season
1/11/1926		Minnesota	W 17–8	4-1 (1-0)	New Gymnasium; Champaign, IL
1/16/1926		at Ohio State	L 18–30	4-2 (1-1)	Ohio Expo Center Coliseum; Columbus, OH
1/18/1926		at Michigan	W 34–24	5-2 (2-1)	Yost Field House; Ann Arbor, MI
1/23/1926		University of Chicago	L 14–19	5-3 (2-2)	Bartlett Gymnasium (4,725); Chicago, IL
2/6/1926*		at Notre Dame	L 14–26	5-4	New Gymnasium; Champaign, IL
2/10/1926		Purdue	W 29–28	6-4 (3-2)	New Gymnasium; Champaign, IL
2/13/1926		Ohio State	W 35–31	7-4 (4-2)	New Gymnasium; Champaign, IL
2/19/1926		at Indiana; Rivalry	W 21–20	8-4 (5-2)	Men's Gymnasium; Bloomington, IN
2/22/1926		University of Chicago	W 24–16	9-4 (6-2)	New Gymnasium; Champaign, IL
2/26/1926		Michigan	L 24–33	9-5 (6-3)	New Gymnasium; Champaign, IL
3/1/1926		at Purdue	L 23–28	9-6 (6-4)	Memorial Gymnasium; West Lafayette, IN
3/6/1926		Indiana; Rivalry	L 25–28	9-7 (6-5)	New Gymnasium; Champaign, IL
3/8/1926		at Minnesota	L 21–28	9-8 (6-6)	Kenwood Armory; Minneapolis, MN
*Non-conference game. ^{#}Rankings from AP Poll. (#) Tournament seedings in parentheses. All times are in Central Time.
