= 1925–26 Michigan Wolverines men's basketball team =

American college basketball season

1925–26 Michigan Wolverines men's basketball
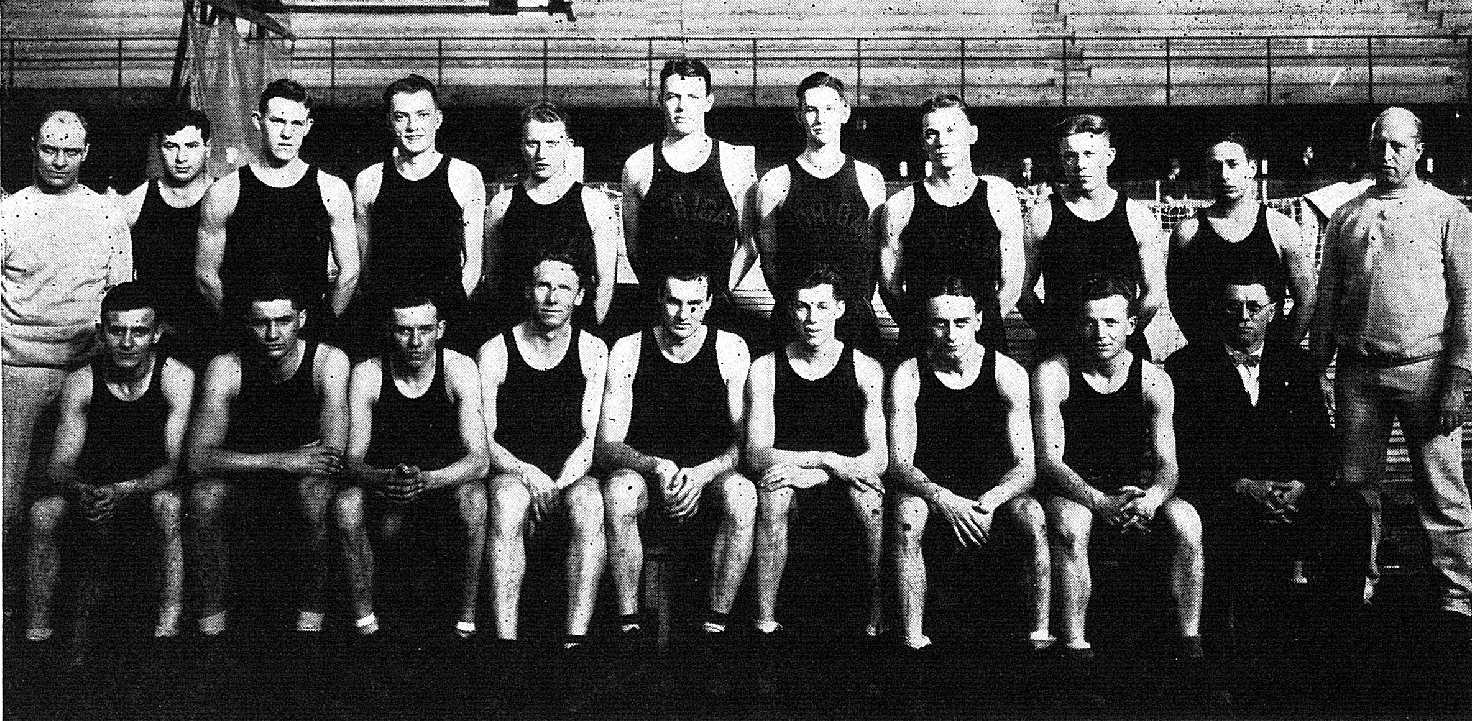

Big Ten regular season co-champions
- Conference: Big Ten Conference
- Record: 12–5 (8–4 Big Nine)
- Head coach: E. J. Mather
- Assistant coaches: Frank Hayes; Franklin Cappon
- Captain: Richard Doyle
- Home arena: Yost Field House

1925–26 Big Ten Conference men's basketball standings
| | Conf. | | | | Overall |
| Team | W | | L | PCT | W | | L | PCT |
|---|---|---|---|---|---|---|---|---|
| Purdue | 8 | – | 4 | .667 | 13 | – | 4 | .765 |
| Indiana | 8 | – | 4 | .667 | 12 | – | 5 | .706 |
| Iowa | 8 | – | 4 | .667 | 12 | – | 5 | .706 |
| Michigan | 8 | – | 4 | .667 | 12 | – | 5 | .706 |
| Illinois | 6 | – | 6 | .500 | 9 | – | 8 | .529 |
| Ohio State | 6 | – | 6 | .500 | 10 | – | 7 | .588 |
| Minnesota | 5 | – | 7 | .417 | 7 | – | 10 | .412 |
| Wisconsin | 4 | – | 8 | .333 | 8 | – | 9 | .471 |
| Northwestern | 4 | – | 8 | .333 | 5 | – | 11 | .313 |
| Chicago | 3 | – | 9 | .250 | 5 | – | 12 | .294 |

The 1925–26 Michigan Wolverines men's basketball team represented the University of Michigan in intercollegiate college basketball during the 1925–26 season. The team tied with the Purdue Boilermakers, Indiana Hoosiers and Iowa Hawkeyes for the Western Conference Championship. E. J. Mather was in his seventh season as the coach. Team captain Richard Doyle became the school's first basketball All-American.

== Season record ==
December 12: Michigan 32, Ohio Wesleyan 27
December 17: Michigan 34, Univ. of Pittsburgh 25
January 2: Michigan 27, Missouri 19
January 9: Michigan 32, Northwestern 30
January 11: Michigan 22, Iowa 16
January 16: Michigan 38, Michigan State 15
January 18: Illinois 31, Michigan 29
February 6: Syracuse 36, Michigan 32
February 8: Michigan 33, Minnesota 22
February 13: Iowa 24, Michigan 21
February 15: Minnesota 28, Michigan 17
February 20: Ohio State 32, Michigan 31
February 22: Michigan 22, Wisconsin 13
February 26: Michigan 33, Illinois 24
March 1: Michigan 24, Wisconsin 23
March 6: Michigan 44, Ohio State 28
March 8: Michigan 46, Northwestern 14
