= Tink Gillam =

American football, baseball, and basketball coach

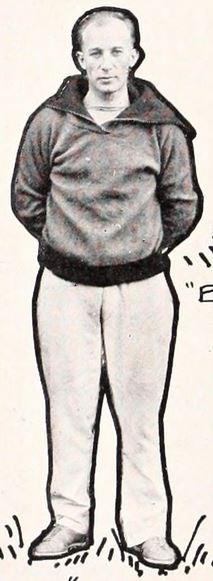
- Gillam in 1926

Biographical details
- Born: April 22, 1896; Dadeville, Alabama, U.S.
- Died: February 18, 1988 (aged 91); Birmingham, Alabama, U.S.

Playing career

Football
- 1915–1919: Birmingham–Southern
- Position: Halfback

Coaching career (HC unless noted)

Football
- 1917: Hamilton (AL) Agricultural School
- 1923–1924: Mercer (assistant)
- 1925–1927: Clemson (assistant)

Basketball
- 1923–1925: Mercer
- 1925–1927: Clemson

Baseball
- 1927: Clemson

Administrative career (AD unless noted)
- 1920–1921: Southern Military Academy
- 1921–1923: Mississippi College (assistant AD)

Head coaching record
- Overall: 11–13–1 (baseball); 42–42 (basketball)

Accomplishments and honors

Championships
- Basketball; 2 SIAA (1924–1925)

Awards
- Birmingham–Southern Sports Hall of Fame (1990)

Monroe Parker "Tink" Gillam (1896–1988) was an American college football, baseball, and basketball coach. Born in Dadeville, Alabama, Gillam attended Birmingham College, where he played baseball, basketball, and was a halfback on the football team. After graduating in 1919, Gillam was athletic director at Southern Military Academy in Greensboro, Alabama, from 1920–1921 and assistant athletic director at Mississippi College from 1921–1923.

Beginning in 1923, Gillam was an assistant football coach and head basketball coach at Mercer University. He won back-to-back Southern Intercollegiate Athletic Association basketball titles as coach at Mercer, earning him the title "the Napoleon of Southern basketball".

Gillam then moved to Clemson College, where he spent two seasons as a football assistant, and was head basketball coach in 1925–26 and 1926–27, and head baseball coach in 1927.

Gillam was inducted into the Birmingham–Southern Sports Hall of Fame in 1990.

== Head coaching record ==
=== Basketball ===
Record table
Season	Team	Overall	Conference	Standing	Postseason
Mercer Bears (Southern Intercollegiate Athletic Association) (1923–1925)
1923–24	Mercer	22–6	6–1		
1924–25	Mercer	14–6	?		
Mercer:		36–12 (.750)			
Clemson Tigers (Southern Conference) (1925–1927)
1925–26	Clemson	4–17	1–7		
1926–27	Clemson	2–13	1–7		
Clemson:		6–30 (.167)	2–14 (.125)		
Total:		42–42 (.500)			
National champion Postseason invitational champion Conference regular season champion Conference regular season and conference tournament champion Division regular season champion Division regular season and conference tournament champion Conference tournament champion

=== Baseball ===
Record table
Season	Team	Overall	Conference	Standing	Postseason
1927	Clemson	11–13–1			
Total:		11–13–1 (.460)			
