= 1925–26 Indiana Hoosiers men's basketball team =

American college basketball season

1925–26 Indiana Hoosiers men's basketball

Big Ten Champions
- Conference: Big Ten Conference
- Record: 12–5 (8–4 Big Ten)
- Head coach: Everett Dean (2nd season)
- Captain: Palmer Sponsler
- Home arena: Men's Gymnasium

1925–26 Big Ten Conference men's basketball standings
	Conf.				Overall
Team	W		L	PCT	W		L	PCT
Purdue	8	–	4	.667	13	–	4	.765
Indiana	8	–	4	.667	12	–	5	.706
Iowa	8	–	4	.667	12	–	5	.706
Michigan	8	–	4	.667	12	–	5	.706
Illinois	6	–	6	.500	9	–	8	.529
Ohio State	6	–	6	.500	10	–	7	.588
Minnesota	5	–	7	.417	7	–	10	.412
Wisconsin	4	–	8	.333	8	–	9	.471
Northwestern	4	–	8	.333	5	–	11	.313
Chicago	3	–	9	.250	5	–	12	.294

The 1925–26 Indiana Hoosiers men's basketball team represented Indiana University. Their head coach was Everett Dean, who was in his 2nd year. The team played its home games at the Men's Gymnasium in Bloomington, Indiana, and was a member of the Big Ten Conference.

The Hoosiers finished the regular season with an overall record of 12–5 and a conference record of 8–4, finishing 1st in the Big Ten Conference.

== Roster ==
No.	Name	Position	Ht.	Year	Hometown
3	Art Beckner	F	6–1	Jr.	Muncie, Indiana
4	Robert Correll	G	6–1	So.	Bloomington, Indiana
10	Ed Farmer	C	6–4	So.	Bloomington, Indiana
18	Charles Benzel	G	5–8	Jr.	Bedford, Indiana
N/A	Herman Byers	F	N/A	So.	Evansville, Indiana
N/A	Harold Derr	F	5–8	So.	Huntington, Indiana
N/A	Millard Easton	G	6–1	Sr.	Sandborn, Indiana
N/A	Edward Jones	C	N/A	So.	Oolitic, Indiana
N/A	Julius Krueger	F	6–1	Jr.	Bloomington, Indiana
N/A	Ralph McClintock	F	N/A	N/A	Bloomington, Indiana
N/A	Gale Robinson	C	N/A	N/A	Connersville, Indiana
N/A	Frank Sibley	C	6–2	Jr.	Gary, Indiana
N/A	Palmer Sponsler	G	6–1	Sr.	Bloomington, Indiana
N/A	Jack Winston	G/F	6–6	Sr.	Washington, Indiana

== Schedule/results ==
Date time, TV	Rank^{#}	Opponent^{#}	Result	Record	Site city, state
Regular season
12/10/1925*		Miami (OH)	W 47–26	1–0	Men's Gymnasium; Bloomington, IN
12/15/1925*		DePauw	L 20–33	1–1	Men's Gymnasium; Bloomington, IN
12/19/1925*		Wabash	W 35–27	2–1	Men's Gymnasium; Bloomington, IN
1/5/1926*		Kentucky; Indiana–Kentucky rivalry	W 34–23	3–1	Men's Gymnasium; Bloomington, IN
1/9/1926		Minnesota	W 33–28	4–1 (1–0)	Men's Gymnasium; Bloomington, IN
1/11/1926		at Wisconsin	L 31–33	4–2 (1–1)	Red Gym; Madison, WI
1/16/1926		at Iowa	L 22–29	4–3 (1–2)	Iowa Armory; Iowa City, IA
1/18/1926		at Northwestern	W 39–31	5–3 (2–2)	Old Patten Gymnasium; Evanston, IL
1/23/1926		Purdue; Rivalry	W 37–34	6–3 (3–2)	Men's Gymnasium; Bloomington, IN
2/1/1926		Iowa	W 30–20	7–3 (4–2)	Men's Gymnasium; Bloomington, IN
2/13/1926		at Purdue; Rivalry	L 29–31	7–4 (4–3)	Memorial Gymnasium; West Lafayette, IN
2/19/1926		Illinois; Rivalry	L 20–21	7–5 (4–4)	Men's Gymnasium; Bloomington, IN
2/26/1926		at Minnesota	W 41–23	8–5 (5–4)	Kenwood Armory; Minneapolis, MN
2/27/1926*		at Carleton	W 38–36	9–5 (5–4)	Northfield, MN
3/2/1926		Northwestern	W 34–28	10–5 (6–4)	Men's Gymnasium; Bloomington, IN
3/6/1926		at Illinois; Rivalry	W 28–25	11–5 (7–4)	Huff Hall; Champaign, IL
3/9/1926		Wisconsin	W 35–20	12–5 (8–4)	Men's Gymnasium; Bloomington, IN
*Non-conference game. ^{#}Rankings from AP Poll. (#) Tournament seedings in parentheses.
