= John Cashman (basketball) =

American basketball player and coach

Biographical details
- Born: March 18, 1892
- Died: December 6, 1949 (aged 57)

Coaching career (HC unless noted)
- 1925–1926: Villanova (assistant)
- 1926–1929: Villanova

John Joseph Aloysius "Rube" Cashman Jr. (March 24, 1892 – December 6, 1949) was an American basketball player and college coach. He served as the second head men's basketball coach at Villanova University from 1926 to 1929. With three seasons at Villanova, he is their shortest-tenured coach in the program's history.

== Coaching career ==
Cashman started as an assistant coach for Villanova University. In 1926, he became the team's head coach. In his first season, the Wildcats had an 11–7 record.

The following seasons were disrupted by a college fire. With their main gymnasium converted into laboratory space, the Wildcats had to practice off-campus and had to find an alternate site for their home games. In three years with the team, he had a record of 21–26 (.447). This makes him their shortest-tenured coach in the program's history.
