= David V. Connelly =

American coach (1898–1955)

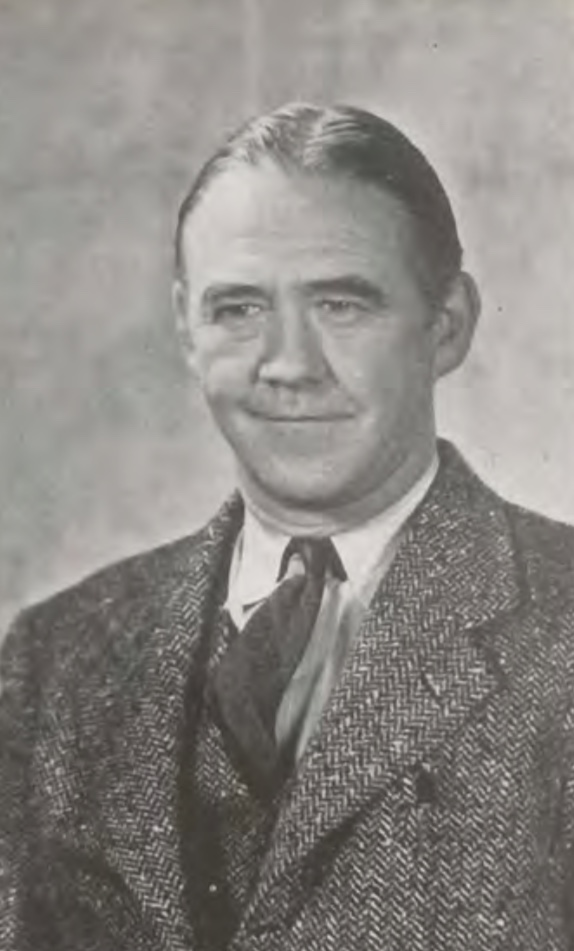
- Connelly from the 1942 Blockhouse

Biographical details
- Born: September 14, 1898; Easthampton, Massachusetts, U.S.
- Died: August 27, 1955 (aged 56); Toledo, Ohio, U.S.

Coaching career (HC unless noted)

Basketball
- 1926–1934: Toledo

Baseball
- 1932–1950: Toledo

Administrative career (AD unless noted)
- 1928–1936: Toledo
- 1942–1943: Toledo
- 1944–1949: Toledo

Head coaching record
- Overall: 48–78 (basketball); 114–93 (baseball)

David Vincent Connelly (September 14, 1898 – August 27, 1955) was an American baseball and basketball coach and college athletics administrator. He was affiliated with the University of Toledo as a coach and athletic director for approximately 30 years.

== Early years ==
Connelly was born in Easthampton, Massachusetts, in 1898. He served in Company A, 345th Battalion, Tank Corps, during World War I, where he was promoted to corporal.

After being discharged from the Army, he played professional basketball in the New York State Basketball League. He also played professional baseball as a shortstop in the Detroit Tigers farm system with a team in Jackson, Michigan. After sustaining an injury in 1924, he enrolled at Michigan State Normal College where he received a degree in physical education.

== University of Toledo ==
In 1926, Connelly applied to be the head baseball coach at the University of Toledo. However, this was a typographical error school and the school was looking for a men's basketball coach. Connelly accepted the job anyway and served as the school's men's basketball coach for eight years from 1926 to 1934, compiling a 48–78 record. He served three stints as Toledo's athletic director (1928 to 1934, 1942 to 1943, and 1944 to 1949) and was the head baseball coach at the University of Toledo from 1932 to 1950, compiling a 114–93 record. Connelly remained at the University of Toledo for nearly 30 years, and his other positions included track and cross country coach for six years, football coach for three years, and boxing coach for one year. From 1949 until 1955, he served as a professor of physical education and head of the department of physical education. He also wrote the University of Toledo's fight song, "U of Toledo", in 1932. Connelly also served as the City of Toledo's recreation supervisor during the summers from 1932 to 1937.

== Family and death ==
Connelly and his wife, Mary McHugh Connelly, had two sons and a daughter. Connelly died in 1955 in Toledo at age 56 and is buried at Calvary Cemetery, Toledo.
