= Centre Colonels men's basketball =

NCAA Division III Men's Basketball team representing Centre College

2019–20 Centre Colonels men's basketball team
- University: Centre College
- Athletic director: Brad Fields
- Head coach: Gavin Root (1st season)
- Conference: SAA
- Location: Danville, Kentucky
- Arena: Alumni Gymnasium
- Nickname: Colonels
- Colors: Gold and white

Conference tournament champions
- 2007, 2009, 2010, 2011

Conference regular-season champions
- 1910, 1911, 1919, 1974, 1979, 1983, 1984, 1985, 1986, 1987, 1988, 1989, 1990, 2007

The Centre Colonels men's basketball team is an American college basketball team that represents Centre College in NCAA Division III.

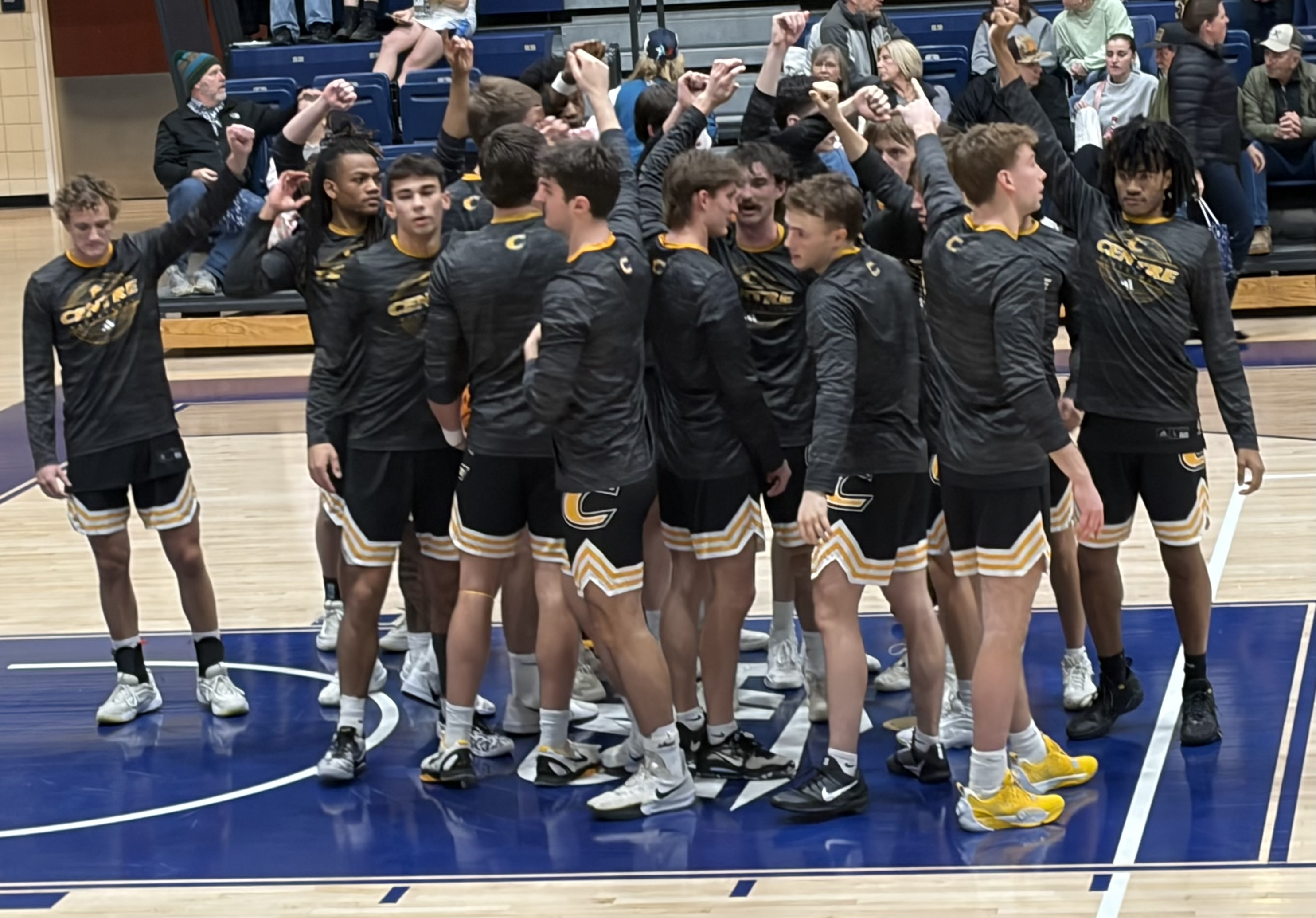
The 2025-26 Colonels

The Colonels are currently coached by interim head coach Gavin Root. The team won several Southern Collegiate Athletic Conference titles. M. B. Banks and J. Quinn Decker once coached the team.
