= 1925–26 North Carolina Tar Heels men's basketball team =

American college basketball season

1925–26 North Carolina Tar Heels men's basketball
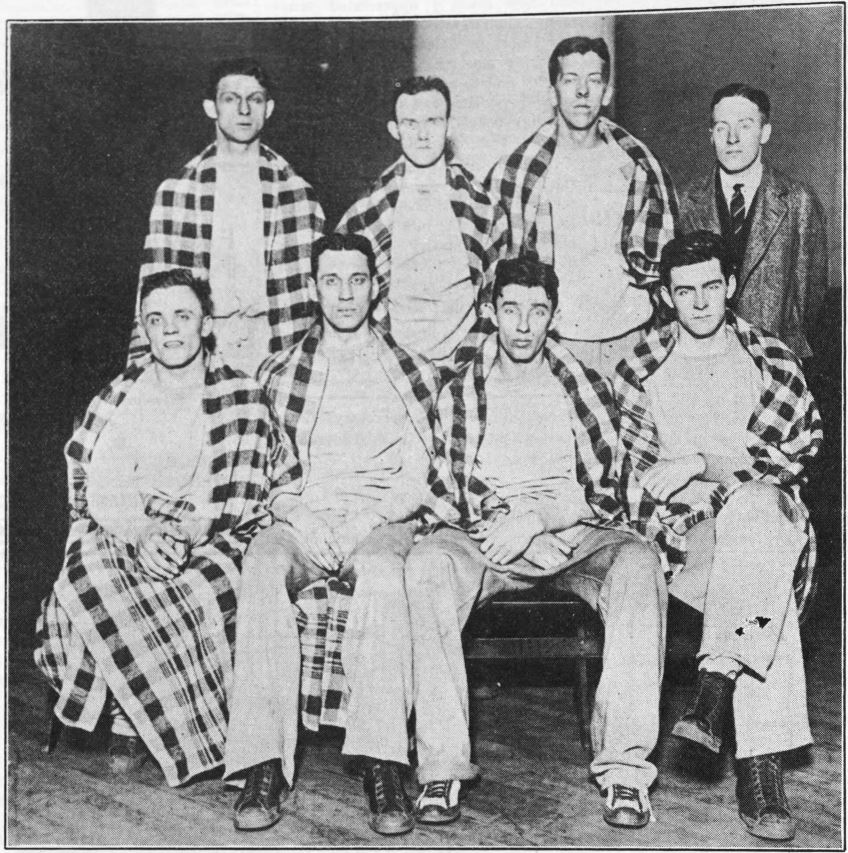

SoCon Tournament Champion
- Conference: Southern Conference
- Record: 20–5 (7–0 SoCon)
- Head coach: Harlan Sanborn
- Captain: Bill Dodderer
- Home arena: Tin Can

1925–26 Southern Conference men's basketball standings
	Conf.				Overall
Team	W		L	PCT	W		L	PCT
Kentucky	8	–	0	1.000	15	–	3	.833
North Carolina†	7	–	0	1.000	20	–	5	.800
Mississippi	8	–	1	.889	16	–	2	.889
Maryland	7	–	1	.875	14	–	3	.824
Georgia	9	–	4	.692	18	–	6	.750
South Carolina	4	–	2	.667	9	–	5	.643
NC State	5	–	3	.625	20	–	3	.870
Mississippi A&M	5	–	3	.625	14	–	8	.636
Tulane	10	–	7	.588	11	–	7	.611
Alabama	6	–	6	.500	10	–	11	.476
Virginia	4	–	4	.500	9	–	6	.600
LSU	4	–	5	.444	9	–	9	.500
VMI	3	–	5	.375	8	–	6	.571
Georgia Tech	4	–	10	.286	6	–	11	.353
Virginia Tech	2	–	5	.286	3	–	10	.231
Washington and Lee	2	–	6	.250	9	–	7	.563
Tennessee	1	–	3	.250	9	–	8	.529
Vanderbilt	2	–	7	.222	8	–	18	.308
Auburn	1	–	7	.125	5	–	10	.333
Clemson	1	–	7	.125	4	–	17	.190
Sewanee	0	–	2	.000	4	–	6	.400
Florida	0	–	3	.000	7	–	7	.500
† Southern Conference Tournament winner As of April 30, 1926; Rankings from none

The 1925–26 North Carolina Tar Heels men's basketball team represented the University of North Carolina during the 1925–26 NCAA men's basketball season in the United States. The team finished the season with a 20–5 record and won the 1926 Southern Conference men's basketball tournament. Jack Cobb was Helms Foundation College Basketball Player of the Year.
