= Michael Saxe =

American basketball player and coach

Michael A. Saxe (December 22, 1886 – May 26, 1955, Philadelphia, Pennsylvania) was an American basketball player and coach.

Saxe was the captain of the basketball team at Philadelphia's Central High School in 1906.

He attended the University of Pennsylvania, where he played from 1908 to 1910, leading the Quakers to a 23–4 record and an Ivy League championship in 1908.

He graduated from the University of Pennsylvania Law School in 1910, and served in the U.S. Army during World War I.

He was the first head men's basketball coach at Villanova University from 1920 to 1926, compiling a 64-30 (.681) record overall. His best season was 1925, when the team finished 10–1. He later coached at La Salle University.

Saxe died of a heart attack at his home in Philadelphia in 1955.
