= 1925–26 Niagara Purple Eagles men's basketball team =

American college basketball season

1925–26 Niagara Purple Eagles men's basketball
- Conference: Independent
- Record: 12–6
- Head coach: Pete Dwyer (3rd season)

The 1925–26 Niagara Purple Eagles men's basketball team represented Niagara University during the 1925–26 NCAA college men's basketball season. The head coach was Pete Dwyer, coaching his third season with the Purple Eagles.

== Schedule ==
Date time, TV	Opponent	Result	Record	Site city, state
	Tuscarora Indians	W 30–18	1–0	Lewiston, NY
	Syracuse Orangemen	L 18–22	1–1	Lewiston, NY
	Hobart	W 23–20	2–1	Lewiston, NY
	Rochester Opt.	W 36–15	3–1	Lewisburg, NY
1/15/1926	Villanova	L 18–24	3–2	Lewiston, NY
	Buffalo	L 22–37	3–3	Lewiston, NY
	Tuscarora Indians	W 37–34	4–3	Lewiston, NY
1/24/1926	St. Bonaventure	W 21–20	5–3	Lewiston, NY
	Alfred	W 34–19	6–3	Olean, NY
	Rochester	L 28–35	6–4	Lewisburg, NY
2/06/1926	at Canisius	W 24–23	7–4	Buffalo, NY
2/15/1926	St. John's	L 24–26	7–5	Queens, NY
	Crescent A.C.	L 28–37	7–6	Lewiston, NY
2/28/1926	St. Bonaventure	W 15–13	8–6	Butler Gym; Olean, NY
	John Carroll	W 41–20	9–6	Lewiston, NY
	Buffalo	W 32–24	10–6	Lewiston, NY
	Alfred	W 36–20	11–6	Lewiston, NY
	Canisius	W 40–17	12–6	Lewiston, NY
*Non-conference game. (#) Tournament seedings in parentheses.
