= 1925–26 Buffalo Bisons men's basketball team =

American college basketball season

1925–26 Buffalo Bisons men's basketball
- Conference: Independent
- Record: 11–6
- Head coach: Art Powell (11th season)

The 1925–26 Buffalo Bisons men's basketball team represented the University of Buffalo during the 1925–26 NCAA college men's basketball season. The head coach was Art Powell, coaching his eleventh season with the Bisons.

== Schedule ==
Date time, TV	Opponent	Result	Record	Site city, state
	Rochester Opt.	W 26–20	1–0	Buffalo, NY
	Toronto	W 43–26	2–0	Buffalo, NY
	Syracuse	L 25–29	2–1	Buffalo, NY
	Cornell	W 19–15	3–1	Buffalo, NY
	Princeton	W 25–23	4–1	Buffalo, NY
	at Syracuse	L 23–24	4–2	Archbold Gymnasium; Syracuse, NY
	at Hobart	W 32–21	5–2	Buffalo, NY
	Rochester	L 20–33	5–3	Rochester, NY
	at Colgate	L 24–33	5–4	Hamilton, NY
	Niagara	W 37–22	6–4	Buffalo, NY
	at R.P.I.	W 38–31	7–4	Buffalo, NY
	Rochester	L 24–28	7–5	Buffalo, NY
	Oberlin	W 43–25	8–5	Buffalo, NY
	at Hobart	W 37–24	9–5	Geneva, NY
	Niagara	L 24–32	9–6	Lewiston, NY
	Allegheny	W 27–23	10–6	Buffalo, NY
	Colgate	W 33–23	11–6	Buffalo, NY
*Non-conference game. (#) Tournament seedings in parentheses.
