= Clemson Tigers men's basketball, 1920–1929 =

The Clemson Tigers men's basketball teams of 1920–1929 represented Clemson Agricultural College in NCAA college basketball competition.

== 1919–20 ==
1919–20 Clemson Tigers men's basketball
- Conference: Independent
- Record: 8–6
- Head coach: Country Morris
- Home arena: YMCA Building

Date	Opponent	Site	Result
January 15	Wofford	YMCA Building • Calhoun, SC	L 39–40
January 17	at Furman	Greenville, SC	W 38–23
January 19	at South Carolina	Columbia, SC	L 15–22
January 23	at Georgia	Athens, GA	L 17–32
January 24	at Georgia Tech	Atlanta, GA	L 22–36
January 26	Alabama Polytechnic	YMCA Building • Calhoun, SC	L 12–60
January 30	Georgia	YMCA Building • Calhoun, SC	L 24–34
N/A	Furman	YMCA Building • Calhoun, SC	W 36–18
February 7	at Davidson	Davidson, NC	W 28–25
February 14	at Presbyterian	Clinton, SC	W 32–23
February 19	Newberry	YMCA Building • Calhoun, SC	W 53–15
February 21	Georgia Tech	YMCA Building • Calhoun, SC	W 41–17
February 23	South Carolina	YMCA Building • Calhoun, SC	W 38–15
March 2	Presbyterian	YMCA Building • Calhoun, SC	W 51–37

== 1920–21 ==
1920–21 Clemson Tigers men's basketball
- Conference: Independent
- Record: 10–5
- Head coach: Larry Conover
- Home arena: YMCA Building

Date	Opponent	Site	Result
January 12	Wofford	YMCA Building • Calhoun, SC	W 37–29
January 14	Furman	YMCA Building • Calhoun, SC	W 50–15
January 26	Greenville YMCA	YMCA Building • Calhoun, SC	W 51–32
January 29	at Georgia	Athens, GA	L 22–45
February 3	College of Charleston	YMCA Building • Calhoun, SC	W 65–24
February 5	at Georgia Tech	Atlanta, GA	L 22–28
February 8	Presbyterian	YMCA Building • Calhoun, SC	W 35–21
February 11	at Presbyterian	Clinton, SC	W 21–8
February 12	at Newberry	Newberry, SC	L 14–15
February 14	South Carolina	YMCA Building • Calhoun, SC	W 44–16
February 17	at South Carolina	Columbia, SC	W 24–10
February 18	at College of Charleston	Charleston, SC	W 49–12
February 19	at The Citadel	Charleston, SC	L 26–28
February 25*	vs. Alabama Polytechnic	Municipal Auditorium • Atlanta, GA (Southern Conference tournament)	L 25–45
March 5	at Wofford	Spartanburg, SC	W 25–15

== 1921–22 ==
1921–22 Clemson Tigers men's basketball
- Conference: Southern Conference
- Record: 8–13 (0–3 SoCon)
- Head coach: E. J. Stewart
- Home arena: YMCA Building; Riggs Field House

The Tigers began play in the Southern Conference.

Date	Opponent	Site	Result
January 7*	Greenville YMCA	Calhoun, SC	L 31–35
January 11*	at Spartanburg YMCA	Spartanburg, SC	L 11–34
January 13	Georgia	Calhoun, SC	L 16–24
January 16*	at Greenville YMCA	Greenville, SC	W 24–18
January 19*	at Mercer	Macon, GA	L 9–32
January 20*	at Camp Benning	Camp Benning, GA	L 24–38
January 21	at Alabama Polytechnic	Auburn, AL	L 19–32
January 24*	Furman	Calhoun, SC	L 17–27
January 26*	at Presbyterian	Clinton, SC	W 29–17
January 28*	at College of Charleston	Charleston, SC	W 30–16
January 28*	at The Citadel	Charleston, SC	L 8–29
January 30*	at Furman	Greenville, SC	L 26–45
February 4*	Piedmont	Calhoun, SC	W 21–12
February 13*	College of Charleston	Calhoun, SC	W 35–8
February 14*	The Citadel	Calhoun, SC	W 20–19
February 16	at Kentucky	Alumni Hall • Lexington, KY	L 14–38
February 17*	at Georgetown (KY)	Georgetown, KY	W 34–28
February 18*	at Centre	Danville, KY	L 24–44
February 21*	Davidson	Calhoun, SC	L 16–32
February 24*	vs. Tulane	Municipal Auditorium • Atlanta, GA (Southern Conference tournament)	L 20–31
March 4*	Presbyterian	Calhoun, SC	W 25–15
*Non-Conference Game.

== 1922–23 ==
1922–23 Clemson Tigers men's basketball
- Conference: Southern Conference
- Record: 11–6 (3–3 SoCon)
- Head coach: E. J. Stewart
- Home arena: Riggs Field House

Date	Opponent	Site	Result
January 11	Georgia	Riggs Field House • Calhoun, SC	L 23–29
January 13	Georgia Tech	Riggs Field House • Calhoun, SC	L 17–26
January 20	South Carolina	Riggs Field House • Calhoun, SC	W 27–19
January 22*	Mercer	Riggs Field House • Calhoun, SC	L 12–17
January 27	at Georgia Tech	Atlanta, GA	L 22–35
January 29	Alabama Polytechnic	Riggs Field House • Calhoun, SC	W 24–19
January 30*	Furman	Riggs Field House • Calhoun, SC	W 23–14
February 2*	Georgetown (KY)	Riggs Field House • Calhoun, SC	W 39–7
February 5*	at Furman	Greenville, SC	W 25–18
February 12*	College of Charleston	Riggs Field House • Calhoun, SC	W 28–7
February 15	at Kentucky	Alumni Hall • Lexington, KY	W 30–13
February 16*	at Georgetown (KY)	Georgetown, KY	W 19–12
February 17*	at Centre	Danville, KY	L 24–26
February 21*	Davidson	Riggs Field House • Calhoun, SC	W 25–18
February 22*	Presbyterian	Riggs Field House • Calhoun, SC	W 32–5
February 27*	vs. Centre	Municipal Auditorium • Atlanta, GA (Southern Conference tournament)	L 23–27
March 5*	Presbyterian	Riggs Field House • Calhoun, SC	W 35–13
*Non-Conference Game.

== 1923–24 ==
1923–24 Clemson Tigers men's basketball
- Conference: Southern Conference
- Record: 2–17 (0–8 SoCon)
- Head coach: Bud Saunders
- Home arena: Riggs Field House

1923–24 Southern Conference men's basketball standings
	Conf.				Overall
Team	W		L	PCT	W		L	PCT
Tulane	10	–	0	1.000	21	–	1	.955
North Carolina†	7	–	0	1.000	26	–	0	1.000
Georgia	7	–	0	1.000	16	–	5	.762
Alabama	5	–	1	.833	12	–	4	.750
Kentucky	6	–	2	.750	13	–	3	.813
Mississippi A&M	8	–	4	.667	13	–	8	.619
Virginia	3	–	2	.600	12	–	3	.800
Tennessee	5	–	5	.500	10	–	8	.556
South Carolina	2	–	2	.500	11	–	9	.550
Georgia Tech	4	–	5	.444	9	–	13	.409
Mississippi	2	–	4	.333	16	–	6	.727
Washington and Lee	2	–	4	.333	9	–	5	.643
NC State	2	–	4	.333	7	–	16	.304
Maryland	1	–	2	.333	5	–	7	.417
Vanderbilt	1	–	3	.250	7	–	15	.318
Florida	0	–	2	.000	5	–	10	.333
Sewanee	0	–	2	.000	2	–	7	.222
Virginia Tech	0	–	4	.000	5	–	13	.278
Auburn	0	–	6	.000	4	–	9	.308
Clemson	0	–	6	.000	2	–	14	.125
LSU	0	–	7	.000	8	–	12	.400
† Southern Conference Tournament winner

Date	Opponent	Site	Result
January 5	Georgia Tech	Riggs Field House • Calhoun, SC	L 13–48
January 11	Georgia	Riggs Field House • Calhoun, SC	L 6–24
January 12*	at Spartanburg YMCA	Spartanburg, SC	L 9–23
January 16	at Georgia	Woodruff Hall • Athens, GA	L 13–38
January 17	South Carolina	Riggs Field House • Calhoun, SC	L 16–30
January 22*	Furman	Riggs Field House • Calhoun, SC	L 11–19
January 31	NC State	Riggs Field House • Calhoun, SC	L 15–22
February 1*	at Newberry	Newberry, SC	L 11–34
February 2*	at Presbyterian	Clinton, SC	L 22–39
February 8	at Georgia Tech	Atlanta, GA	L 22–39
February 9*	Presbyterian	Riggs Field House • Calhoun, SC	L 17–20 (OT)
February 13	at Kentucky	Alumni Gymnasium • Lexington, KY	L 13–39
February 14*	at Georgetown (KY)	Georgetown, KY	L 13–33
February 15*	at Maryville	Maryville, TN	L 9–13
February 16	at Tennessee	Knoxville, TN	L 12–18
February 20*	at Furman	Greenville, SC	L 13–24
February 23*	College of Charleston	Riggs Field House • Calhoun, SC	W 29–7
February 28*	vs. Florida	Municipal Auditorium • Atlanta, GA (Southern Conference tournament)	W 17–15
February 29*	vs. Vanderbilt	Municipal Auditorium • Atlanta, GA (Southern Conference tournament)	L 13–42
*Non-Conference Game.

== 1924–25 ==
1924–25 Clemson Tigers men's basketball
- Conference: Southern Conference
- Record: 4–14 (3–2 SoCon)
- Head coach: Bud Saunders
- Home arena: Riggs Field House

Date	Opponent	Site	Result
January 1*	at Monaghan YMCA	Greenville, SC	L 29–42
January 2*	at New Holland	unknown	L 26–28
January 3*	at 22nd Infantry	Fort McPherson, GA	L 35–39
January 10	at Georgia Tech	Temporary Gym • Atlanta, GA	W 20–18
January 15	Georgia	Riggs Field House • Calhoun, SC	W 19–17
January 23*	Newberry	Riggs Field House • Calhoun, SC	L 20–21 (OT)
January 26*	Presbyterian	Riggs Field House • Calhoun, SC	L 22–24
January 28*	at Newberry	Newberry, SC	L 24–35
January 29	at South Carolina	Columbia, SC	L 18–35
January 30*	at College of Charleston	Charleston, SC	L 10–30
January 31*	at The Citadel	Charleston, SC	L 18–34
February 6*	Camp Benning	Riggs Field House • Calhoun, SC	L 23–35
February 7*	Rollins	Riggs Field House • Calhoun, SC	W 32–13
February 13*	The Citadel	Riggs Field House • Calhoun, SC	L 21–25
February 14	Georgia Tech	Riggs Field House • Calhoun, SC	W 32–30
February 19*	Furman	Riggs Field House • Calhoun, SC	L 18–34
February 21*	at Furman	Greenville, SC	L 11–41
February 26	Virginia Tech	Riggs Field House • Calhoun, SC	L 13–27
*Non-Conference Game.

== 1925–26 ==
1925–26 Clemson Tigers men's basketball
- Conference: Southern Conference
- Record: 4–17 (1–7 SoCon)
- Head coach: Tink Gillam
- Home arena: Riggs Field House

Date	Opponent	Site	Result
January 6*	at Saint Stanislaus	Bay St. Louis, MS	L 15–32
January 7*	at New Orleans YMCA	New Orleans, LA	L 23–24 (OT)
January 8	at Tulane	New Orleans, LA	L 22–40
January 9	at Tulane	New Orleans, LA	L 15–36
January 13*	at Wake Forest	Wake Forest, NC	L 34–40
January 14*	at Duke	Durham, NC	L 12–46
January 15	at North Carolina	Indoor Athletic Center • Chapel Hill, NC	L 24–48
January 16	at NC State	Raleigh, NC	L 23–41
January 21	NC State	Riggs Field House • Calhoun, SC	L 16–32
January 23*	Presbyterian	Riggs Field House • Calhoun, SC	W 34–29
January 30*	Newberry	Riggs Field House • Calhoun, SC	W 31–28
February 3*	Furman	Riggs Field House • Calhoun, SC	L 20–36
February 6*	Wofford	Riggs Field House • Calhoun, SC	L 21–25
February 8*	Presbyterian	Riggs Field House • Calhoun, SC	L 18–21
February 9	South Carolina	Columbia, SC	W 38–35
February 10*	at Newberry	Newberry, SC	L 22–26
February 12*	The Citadel	Riggs Field House • Calhoun, SC	L 23–26
February 15*	at Davidson	Davidson, NC	W 32–30
February 17	at Georgia	Woodruff Hall • Athens, GA	L 28–44
February 20	South Carolina	Riggs Field House • Calhoun, SC	L 20–36
February 22*	at Furman	Greenville, SC	L 31–37
*Non-Conference Game.

== 1926–27 ==
1926–27 Clemson Tigers men's basketball
- Conference: Southern Conference
- Record: 2–13 (1–7 SoCon)
- Head coach: Tink Gillam
- Home arena: Riggs Field House

Date	Opponent	Site	Result
January 7	at South Carolina	Columbia, SC	L 26–33
January 8	at South Carolina	Columbia, SC	L 11–37
January 12*	Wofford	Riggs Field House • Calhoun, SC	L 17–37
January 13	Tennessee	Riggs Field House • Calhoun, SC	L 4–17
January 21	South Carolina	Riggs Field House • Calhoun, SC	L 23–48
January 29*	Newberry	Riggs Field House • Calhoun, SC	L 23–24
February 2	at Alabama Polytechnic	Auburn, AL	L 26–42
February 3	at Alabama Polytechnic	Auburn, AL	L 23–45
February 9*	Presbyterian	Riggs Field House • Calhoun, SC	W 16–24
February 11*	at Newberry	Newberry, SC	W 20–18
February 12*	at Presbyterian	Clinton, SC	L 38–39
February 14	at Georgia	Woodruff Hall • Athens, GA	L 23–34
February 16	Florida	Riggs Field House • Calhoun, SC	W 33–16
February 18*	Furman	Riggs Field House • Calhoun, SC	L 22–41
February 21*	at Furman	Greenville, SC	L 28–50
*Non-Conference Game.

== 1927–28 ==
1927–28 Clemson Tigers men's basketball
- Conference: Southern Conference
- Record: 9–14 (5–7 SoCon)
- Head coach: Josh Cody
- Home arena: Riggs Field House

Date	Opponent	Site	Result
December 15*	at Kentucky Wesleyan	Owensboro, KY	L 23–27
December 16	at Kentucky	Alumni Gymnasium • Lexington, KY	L 17–33
December 17*	at Cincinnati	Schmidlapp Gymnasium • Cincinnati, OH	L 16–42
December 19*	at Georgetown (KY)	Georgetown, KY	L 16–33
January 7*	at Furman	Greenville, SC	L 26–33
January 11*	Wofford	Riggs Field House • Calhoun, SC	W 44–21
January 16*	at Mercer	Macon, GA	L 31–37
January 17	at Georgia Tech	Temporary Gym • Atlanta, GA	L 24–42
January 18	at Alabama Polytechnic	Auburn, AL	L 26–56
January 19	at Alabama Polytechnic	Auburn, AL	L 23–30
January 20	at Tulane	New Orleans, LA	L 23–30
January 21	at Tulane	New Orleans, LA	W 34–15
January 28*	Newberry	Riggs Field House • Calhoun, SC	W 16–15
January 31	Georgia	Riggs Field House • Calhoun, SC	L 32–36
February 3*	Furman	Riggs Field House • Calhoun, SC	L 18–35
February 6	at Georgia	Woodruff Hall • Athens, GA	L 25–38
February 8	Florida	Riggs Field House • Calhoun, SC	W 32–29
February 9	Florida	Riggs Field House • Calhoun, SC	W 26–25
February 10	South Carolina	Riggs Field House • Calhoun, SC	W 38–33
February 15*	Davidson	Riggs Field House • Calhoun, SC	W 35–24
February 21*	at Newberry	Newberry, SC	W 38–37
February 22	at South Carolina	Carolina Fieldhouse • Columbia, SC	W 48–46 (2OT)
February 24*	vs. Alabama Polytechnic	Municipal Auditorium • Atlanta, GA (Southern Conference tournament)	L 26–27
*Non-Conference Game.

== 1928–29 ==
1928–29 Clemson Tigers men's basketball
- Conference: Southern Conference
- Record: 15–12 (6–4 SoCon)
- Head coach: Josh Cody
- Home arena: Riggs Field House

Date	Opponent	Site	Result
December 18*	at Erskine	Due West, SC	L 37–41 (OT)
January 2*	at Atlanta Athletic Club	Atlanta, GA	L 30–56
January 3	at Tennessee	Knoxville, TN	L 21–36
January 4*	at Chattanooga	Chattanooga, TN	L 25–31
January 5	at Georgia Tech	Temporary Gym • Atlanta, GA	L 23–29
January 10*	at Mercer	Macon, GA	L 24–40
January 11	at Florida	Building R • Gainesville, FL	W 36–23
January 12	at Florida	Building R • Gainesville, FL	W 31–21
January 14*	at The Citadel	Charleston, SC	L 37–40
January 15	at South Carolina	Carolina Fieldhouse • Columbia, SC	L 24–27 (OT)
January 18*	Newberry	Riggs Field House • Calhoun, SC	W 24–17
January 19*	Wofford	Riggs Field House • Calhoun, SC	W 50–14
January 29*	at Presbyterian	Clinton, SC	W 32–26
January 30*	at Newberry	Newberry, SC	W 25–22
February 1	Alabama Polytechnic	Riggs Field House • Calhoun, SC	W 46–20
February 2*	at Furman	Greenville, SC	L 33–42
February 7*	Erskine	Riggs Field House • Calhoun, SC	W 30–16
February 8	Sewanee	Riggs Field House • Calhoun, SC	W 49–19
February 9*	Furman	Riggs Field House • Calhoun, SC	L 28–29
February 12*	at Wofford	Spartanburg, SC	W 34–17
February 14	Georgia	Riggs Field House • Calhoun, SC	W 30–23
February 15	at South Carolina	Carolina Fieldhouse • Columbia, SC	W 17–12
February 16*	The Citadel	Riggs Field House • Calhoun, SC	W 35–33 (OT)
February 19	at Georgia	Woodruff Hall • Athens, GA	L 25–41
February 26*	Presbyterian	Riggs Field House • Calhoun, SC	W 38–17
March 1*	vs. Georgia Tech	Municipal Auditorium • Atlanta, GA (Southern Conference tournament)	W 30–26
March 2*	vs. NC State	Municipal Auditorium • Atlanta, GA (Southern Conference tournament)	L 28–31
*Non-Conference Game.
