= 1924–25 NCAA men's basketball season =

Men's collegiate basketball season

- Helms National Champions: Princeton (retroactive selection in 1943)
- Player of the Year (Helms): Earl Mueller, Colorado College (retroactive selection in 1944)

The 1924–25 NCAA men's basketball season began in December 1924, progressed through the regular season and conference tournaments, and concluded in March 1925.

== Season headlines ==
- Washburn won the annual Amateur Athletic Union basketball tournament — which included both collegiate and amateur non-collegiate teams — becoming the fourth and final college team to do so.
- In February 1943, the Helms Athletic Foundation retroactively selected Princeton as its national champion for the 1924–25 season.
- In 1995, the Premo-Porretta Power Poll retroactively selected Princeton as its top-ranked team for the 1924–25 season.

== Conference membership changes ==
School	Former conference	New conference
Colorado Normal Bears	Independent	Rocky Mountain Athletic Conference
USC Trojans	Pacific Coast Conference	Independent
Western State Mountaineers	Independent	Rocky Mountain Athletic Conference

== Regular season ==
=== Conferences ===
==== Conference winners and tournaments ====
Conference	Regular season winner	Conference player of the year	Conference tournament	Tournament venue (City)	Tournament winner
Big Ten Conference	Ohio State	None selected	No Tournament		
Eastern Intercollegiate Basketball League	Princeton	None selected	No Tournament		
Missouri Valley Intercollegiate Athletic Association	Kansas	None selected	No Tournament		
Pacific Coast Conference	Oregon Agricultural (North); California (South)		No Tournament; California defeated Oregon Agricultural in best-of-three conference championship playoff series		
Rocky Mountain Athletic Conference	Colorado College (Eastern); BYU (Western)		No Tournament		
Southern Conference	North Carolina	None selected	1925 Southern Conference men's basketball tournament	Municipal Auditorium (Atlanta, Georgia)	North Carolina
Southwest Conference	Oklahoma A&M	None selected	No Tournament		

==== Conference standings ====
1924–25 Big Ten Conference men's basketball standings
	Conf.				Overall
Team	W		L	PCT	W		L	PCT
Ohio State	11	–	1	.917	14	–	2	.875
Indiana	8	–	4	.667	12	–	5	.706
Illinois	8	–	4	.667	11	–	6	.647
Purdue	7	–	4	.636	9	–	5	.643
Michigan	6	–	5	.545	8	–	6	.571
Minnesota	6	–	6	.500	9	–	7	.563
Iowa	5	–	7	.417	6	–	10	.375
Northwestern	4	–	8	.333	6	–	11	.353
Wisconsin	3	–	9	.250	6	–	11	.353
Chicago	1	–	11	.083	3	–	14	.176

1924–25 Eastern Intercollegiate Basketball League standings
	Conf.				Overall
Team	W		L	PCT	W		L	PCT
Princeton	9	–	1	.900	21	–	2	.913
Penn	6	–	4	.600	17	–	5	.773
Dartmouth	6	–	4	.600	12	–	5	.706
Columbia	6	–	4	.600	10	–	7	.588
Cornell	3	–	7	.300	7	–	8	.467
Yale	0	–	10	.000	3	–	16	.158

1924–25 Missouri Valley Intercollegiate Athletic Association men's basketball standings
	Conf.				Overall
Team	W		L	PCT	W		L	PCT
Kansas	15	–	1	.938	17	–	1	.944
Nebraska	13	–	3	.813	14	–	4	.778
Kansas State	10	–	6	.625	10	–	8	.556
Washington University	10	–	6	.625	10	–	8	.556
Oklahoma	9	–	7	.563	10	–	8	.556
Missouri	6	–	10	.375	7	–	11	.389
Drake	4	–	12	.250	4	–	12	.250
Grinnell	4	–	12	.250	4	–	13	.235
Iowa State	1	–	15	.063	2	–	15	.118

1924–25 Pacific Coast Conference men's basketball standings
	Conf.				Overall
Team	W		L	PCT	W		L	PCT
North
Oregon Agricultural	7	–	2	.778	29	–	8	.784
Oregon	7	–	2	.778	16	–	4	.800
Washington	5	–	5	.500	14	–	7	.667
Idaho	5	–	5	.500	19	–	8	.704
Montana	2	–	6	.250	9	–	10	.474
Washington State	2	–	8	.200	18	–	11	.621
South
California †	3	–	1	.750	11	–	4	.733
Stanford	1	–	3	.250	10	–	3	.769
† Conference playoff series winner

1924–25 Rocky Mountain Conference standings
	Conf.				Overall
Team	W		L	PCT	W		L	PCT
Eastern
Colorado College	10	–	3	.769	13	–	3	.813
Northern Colorado	9	–	3	.750	12	–	4	.750
Colorado	7	–	4	.636	9	–	4	.692
Wyoming	5	–	3	.625	9	–	6	.600
Denver	5	–	6	.455	6	–	6	.500
Colorado Mines	4	–	7	.364	4	–	7	.364
Colorado Agricultural	2	–	9	.182	2	–	10	.167
Western State	0	–	6	.000	3	–	6	.333
Western
BYU	5	–	3	.625	10	–	6	.625
Montana State	1	–	1	.500	20	–	4	.833
Utah Agricultural	5	–	5	.500	12	–	7	.632
Utah	3	–	5	.375	5	–	11	.313

1924–25 Southern Conference men's basketball standings
	Conf.				Overall
Team	W		L	PCT	W		L	PCT
North Carolina†	8	–	0	1.000	20	–	5	.800
Tulane	12	–	3	.800	17	–	4	.810
Kentucky	6	–	2	.750	13	–	8	.619
Maryland	3	–	1	.750	12	–	5	.706
Alabama	5	–	2	.714	15	–	4	.789
Virginia	4	–	2	.667	14	–	3	.824
South Carolina	4	–	2	.667	10	–	7	.588
Washington and Lee	3	–	2	.600	8	–	5	.615
Clemson	3	–	2	.600	4	–	14	.222
Vanderbilt	4	–	3	.571	12	–	13	.480
Mississippi A&M	4	–	4	.500	14	–	9	.609
Georgia	4	–	4	.500	9	–	11	.450
Georgia Tech	2	–	7	.222	4	–	12	.250
NC State	1	–	4	.200	11	–	7	.611
LSU	1	–	4	.200	10	–	7	.588
Virginia Tech	1	–	4	.200	6	–	9	.400
Tennessee	1	–	5	.167	6	–	8	.429
Auburn	1	–	5	.167	3	–	11	.214
Mississippi	1	–	6	.143	17	–	8	.680
Florida	0	–	0	–	2	–	7	.222
Sewanee	0	–	0	–	2	–	7	.222
† Southern Conference Tournament winner

1924–25 Southwest Conference men's basketball standings
	Conf.				Overall
Team	W		L	PCT	W		L	PCT
Oklahoma A&M	12	–	2	.857	15	–	3	.833
TCU	11	–	3	.786	14	–	5	.737
Arkansas	10	–	4	.714	21	–	5	.808
Texas	9	–	5	.643	17	–	8	.680
Texas A&M	6	–	8	.429	9	–	8	.529
SMU	4	–	10	.286	5	–	11	.313
Baylor	2	–	12	.143	3	–	12	.200
Rice	2	–	12	.143	2	–	12	.143

=== Independents ===
A total of 97 college teams played as major independents. Washburn (15–0) and Washington College (20–0) were undefeated, and North Dakota Agricultural (26–5) finished with the most wins.

1924–25 NCAA men's basketball independents standings
	Conf.				Overall
Team	W		L	PCT	W		L	PCT
Washburn		–		–	15	–	0	1.000
Washington College		–		–	20	–	0	1.000
Fordham		–		–	18	–	1	.947
Wabash		–		–	18	–	1	.947
New Mexico		–		–	12	–	1	.923
Villanova		–		–	10	–	1	.909
Grove City		–		–	16	–	2	.889
Syracuse		–		–	15	–	2	.882
Saint Louis		–		–	14	–	2	.875
West Texas State		–		–	20	–	3	.870
Creighton		–		–	13	–	2	.867
CCNY		–		–	12	–	2	.857
Penn State		–		–	12	–	2	.857
Union (N.Y.)		–		–	12	–	2	.857
Canisius		–		–	11	–	2	.846
The Citadel		–		–	11	–	2	.846
Evansville		–		–	11	–	2	.846
Harvard		–		–	11	–	2	.846
North Dakota Agricultural		–		–	26	–	5	.839
Butler		–		–	20	–	4	.833
Mount Union		–		–	14	–	3	.824
Vermont		–		–	14	–	3	.824
Franklin		–		–	17	–	4	.810
Western State Normal		–		–	17	–	4	.810
Army		–		–	12	–	3	.800
Denison		–		–	12	–	3	.800
Navy		–		–	18	–	5	.783
Southern California		–		–	14	–	4	.778
Richmond		–		–	13	–	4	.765
Colgate		–		–	15	–	5	.750
Davidson		–		–	18	–	6	.750
Georgetown		–		–	6	–	2	.750
St. John's (N.Y.)		–		–	18	–	6	.750
Indiana State		–		–	11	–	4	.733
Lehigh		–		–	11	–	4	.733
Connecticut		–		–	10	–	4	.714
Rhode Island State		–		–	11	–	5	.688
Ohio		–		–	13	–	6	.684
Wake Forest		–		–	15	–	7	.682
Duquesne		–		–	12	–	6	.667
Holy Cross		–		–	10	–	5	.667
Marshall		–		–	12	–	6	.667
Toledo		–		–	13	–	7	.650
Tempe Normal		–		–	11	–	6	.647
Muhlenberg		–		–	11	–	6	.647
UCLA		–		–	11	–	6	.647
William & Mary		–		–	11	–	6	.647
Bowling Green State		–		–	9	–	5	.643
Valparaiso		–		–	9	–	5	.643
Arizona		–		–	7	–	4	.636
DePauw		–		–	12	–	7	.632
Niagara		–		–	12	–	7	.632
Brown		–		–	10	–	6	.625
Tulsa		–		–	13	–	8	.619
Louisville		–		–	10	–	7	.588
George Washington		–		–	7	–	5	.583
Seton Hall		–		–	8	–	6	.571
Western Kentucky State		–		–	8	–	6	.571
Furman		–		–	9	–	7	.563
St. Bonaventure		–		–	14	–	11	.560
New Mexico A&M		–		–	11	–	9	.550
Temple		–		–	12	–	10	.545
VMI		–		–	6	–	5	.545
Buffalo		–		–	7	–	6	.538
Northern Arizona Normal		–		–	7	–	6	.538
Rutgers		–		–	7	–	6	.538
Wooster		–		–	8	–	7	.533
Carleton		–		–	9	–	8	.529
Saint Francis (N.Y.)		–		–	9	–	8	.529
Bradley		–		–	11	–	10	.524
Detroit		–		–	6	–	6	.500
Manhattan		–		–	10	–	10	.500
New York University		–		–	7	–	7	.500
Notre Dame		–		–	11	–	11	.500
St. Joseph's		–		–	9	–	9	.500
Fairmount		–		–	9	–	9	.500
Xavier		–		–	7	–	7	.500
Springfield (Mass.)		–		–	8	–	9	.471
Loyola (Md.)		–		–	6	–	7	.462
Dayton		–		–	9	–	11	.450
Lafayette		–		–	8	–	11	.421
Marquette		–		–	8	–	11	.421
Boston University		–		–	9	–	13	.409
Santa Clara		–		–	5	–	9	.357
West Virginia		–		–	6	–	11	.353
Kent State Normal		–		–	4	–	8	.333
Saint Mary's (Calif.)		–		–	4	–	8	.333
St. Ignatius		–		–	4	–	8	.333
DePaul		–		–	6	–	13	.316
Michigan Agricultural		–		–	6	–	13	.316
Duke		–		–	4	–	9	.308
Pittsburgh		–		–	4	–	10	.286
Texas State M&M		–		–	3	–	8	.273
Loyola (Ill.)		–		–	4	–	11	.267
Cincinnati		–		–	5	–	14	.263
Miami (Ohio)		–		–	3	–	10	.231
Bucknell		–		–	1	–	4	.200

== Awards ==
=== Helms College Basketball All-Americans ===
The practice of selecting a Consensus All-American Team did not begin until the 1928–29 season. The Helms Athletic Foundation later retroactively selected a list of All-Americans for the 1924–25 season.

Player	Team
Tusten Ackerman	Kansas
Burgess Carey	Kentucky
Jack Cobb	North Carolina
Emanuel Goldblatt	Pennsylvania
Vic Hanson	Syracuse
Noble Kizer	Notre Dame
John Miner	Ohio State
Earl Mueller	Colorado College
Gerald Spohn	Washburn
Carlos Steele	Oregon Agricultural

=== Major player of the year awards ===
- Helms Player of the Year: Earl Mueller, Colorado College (retroactive selection in 1944)

== Coaching changes ==
A number of teams changed coaches during the season and after it ended.

Team	Former Coach	Interim Coach	New Coach	Reason
Arizona	Walter Davis		Fred Enke	
Army	Harry A. Fisher		Ernest Blood	
Auburn	Herb Bunker		Mike Papke	
Boston University	John Williams		Win Karlson	
Bowling Green State	Warren Steller		Paul Landis	
Bucknell	Moose McCormick		Malcolm Musser	
BYU	Alvin Twitchell		E. L. Roberts	
Canisius	Russell Burt		Luke Urban	
The Citadel	C. F. Myers		Locke Brown	
Colorado Agricultural	Harry W. Hughes		Rudy Lavik	
Columbia	Joseph H. Deering		Daniel Meehan	
Denver	Aubrey Devine		Jimmy Middlebrook	
DePaul	Harry Adams		Eddie Anderson	
Detroit	John Barrett		Gus Dorais	
Drake	Ossie Solem		Bill Boelter	
Fairmount	Sam H. Hill		Leonard J. Umnus	
Florida	James L. White		Brady Cowell	
George Washington	Jack Dailey		James Lemon	
Holy Cross	Ken Simendinger		John M. Reed	Reed also coach the freshman football team.
Illinois State	Clifford E. Horton		Don Karnes	
Kent State Normal	Frank Harsh		Merles E. Wagoner	
Kentucky	Clarence Applegram		Ray Eklund	
Lafayette	Bill Anderson		M. A. Miller	
Lehigh	James A. Baldwin		Charles Lingle	
Louisville	Fred Enke		Tom King	Enke left to coach Arizona.
LSU	Hugh E. Wilson		Harry Rabenhorst	
Manhattan	Ward Brennan		Arthur T. Carroll	
Marshall	Russ Meredith		Charles Tallman	
Mississippi A&M	K. P. Gatchell		Bernie Bierman	
Nebraska	William G. Kline		Ernest Bearg	
North Carolina	Monk McDonald		Harlan Sanborn	
North Dakota Agricultural	George Dewey		Ion Cortright	
Northern Arizona	W. E. Rogers		Talbert D. Jessuppe	
Ole Miss	R. L. Sullivan		Homer Hazel	
Rice	John Nicholson		Franklyn Ashcraft	
Santa Clara	Eddie Kienholz		Russell T. Wilson	
Toledo	Darrell Fox		Louis Moorhead	
Tulsa	Howard Archer		J. B. Miller	
Utah	Thomas M. Fitzpatrick		Ike Armstrong	
Vermont	Tom Keady		William McAvoy	
Wake Forest	Hank Garrity		R. S. Hayes	
Yale	Joe Fogarty		George Taylor	Fogarty died on August 15, 1925
