= 1925 NCAA Men's Basketball All-Americans =

- Awarded for: 1924–25 NCAA men's basketball season

The 1925 College Basketball All-American team, as chosen retroactively by the Helms Athletic Foundation. The player highlighted in gold was chosen as the Helms Foundation College Basketball Player of the Year retroactively in 1944.

Player	Team
Tusten Ackerman	Kansas
Burgess Carey	Kentucky
Jack Cobb	North Carolina
Menchy Goldblatt	Pennsylvania
Vic Hanson	Syracuse
Noble Kizer	Notre Dame
John Miner	Ohio State
Earl Mueller	Colorado College
Gerald Spohn	Washburn
Carlos Steele	Oregon Agricultural

== See also ==
- 1924–25 NCAA men's basketball season
