= List of Holy Cross Crusaders men's basketball head coaches =

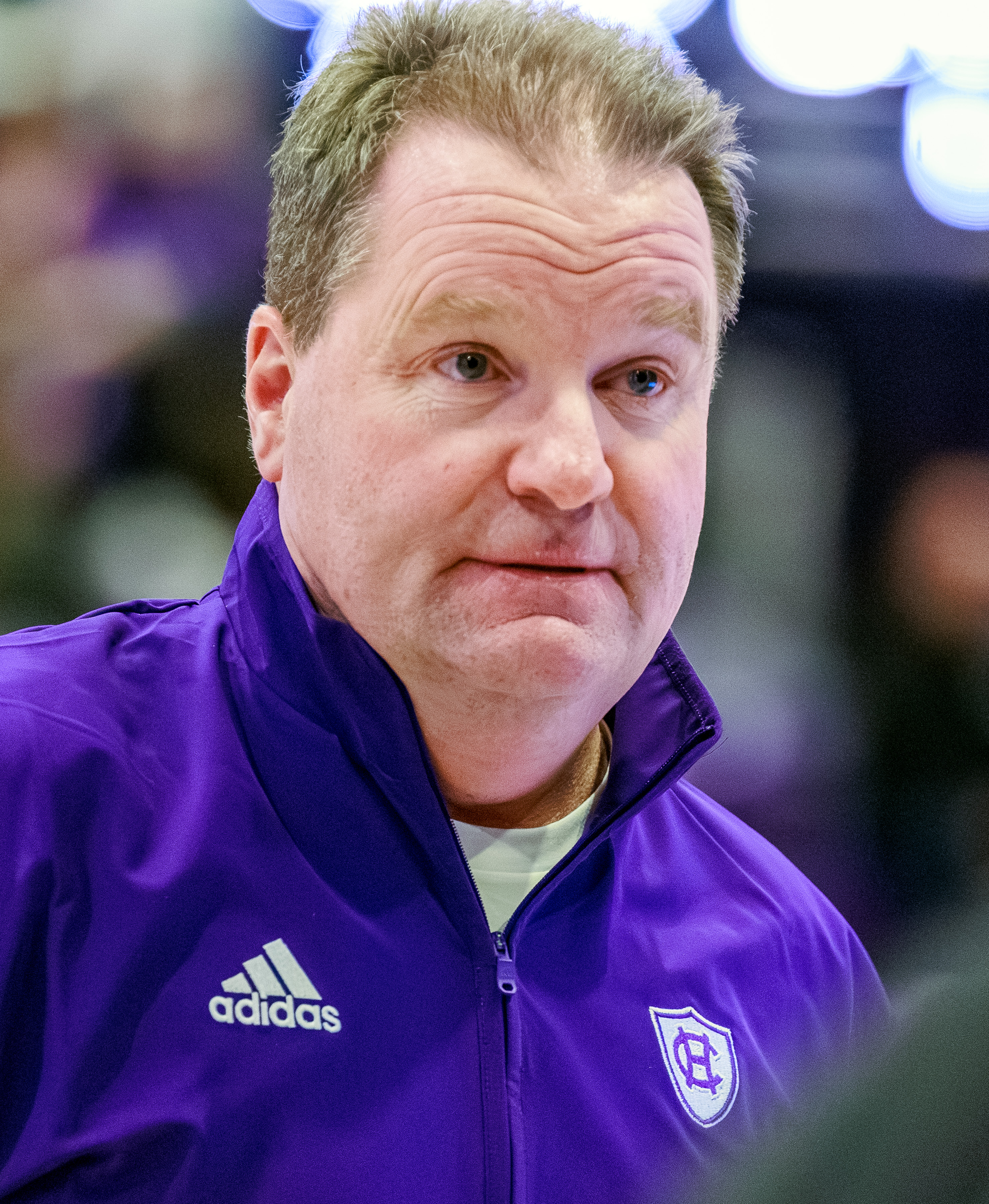
Dave Paulsen was named head coach of the Holy Cross Crusaders in 2023.

The following is a list of Holy Cross Crusaders men's basketball head coaches. There have been 19 head coaches of the Crusaders in their 104-season history.

Holy Cross' current head coach is Dave Paulsen. He was hired in March 2023, replacing Brett Nelson, who was fired after the 2022–23 season.

No.	Tenure	Coach	Years	Record	Pct.
1	1901–1909 (Note: Holy Cross did not field a team for the 1906–07 season.)	J. Fred Powers	7	54–33	.621
2	1920–1924	William Casey	4	28–25	.528
3	1924–1925	Ken Simendinger	1	10–5	.667
4	1925–1931	John M. Reed	6	60–41	.594
5	1934–1935; 1942–1945	Albert Riopel	4	14–34	.292
6	1939–1942	Moose Krause	3	11–14	.440
7	1945–1948	Doggie Julian	3	65–10	.867
8	1948–1955	Buster Sheary	7	155–36	.812
9	1955–1961	Roy Leenig	6	106–48	.688
10	1961–1965	Frank Oftring	4	64–33	.660
11	1965–1972	Jack Donohue	7	106–66	.616
12	1972–1994	George Blaney	22	357–276	.564
13	1994–1999	Bill Raynor	5	54–83	.394
14	1999–2009	Ralph Willard	10	192–117	.621
15	2009–2010	Sean Kearney	1	9–22	.290
16	2010–2015	Milan Brown	5	69–83	.454
17	2015–2019	Bill Carmody	4	58–73	.443
18	2019–2023	Brett Nelson	4	27–84	.243
19	2023–present	Dave Paulsen	1	0–0	–
Totals		19 coaches	104 seasons	1,445–1,089	.570
Records updated through end of 2022–23 season Source
