= 1924–25 Michigan State Normal Normalites men's basketball team =

American college basketball season

1924–25 Michigan State Normal Normalites men's basketball

MIAA
- Conference: Michigan Intercollegiate Athletic Association
- Record: 15–7 (7-1 MIAA)
- Head coach: Joseph H. McCulloch (4th season)
- Assistant coach: Ernest Engel
- Home arena: Gymnasium

The 1924–25 Michigan State Normal Normalites men's basketball team represented the Michigan State Normal School, now Eastern Michigan University, in the 1924–25 NCAA men's basketball season. They were the 1925 MIAA champions. The team finished with a record of 15–7 and 7-1 in the MIAA. The team was led by fourth year head coach Joseph H. McCulloch. Francis Davidson and Charles Lappeus were the team Captains.

== Roster ==
Number	Name	Position	Class	Hometown
	Charles Lappeus	Guard	Senior	
	Virgil Noble	Forward		
	Francis Davidson	Forward	Senior	Pontiac, MI
	Donald Draper	Forward	Junior	
	Robert Button	Guard	Senior	
	Frank Weeber	Guard		
	James Barclay	Forward		
	John Heitsch	Center		
	David Baer	Center		
	LeRoy Pfahler	Forward		
	Harley Reck	Guard		
	Ebner Chaffee	Guard	Sophomore	

== Schedule ==
Date time, TV	Opponent	Result	Record	High points	High rebounds	High assists	Site (attendance) city, state
Non-conference regular season
December 10, 1924*	Oakland Motors	W 22-18	1–0	– -	– -	– -	Gymnasium; Ypsilanti, MI
December 1924*	Adrian	W 25-24	2–0	– -	– -	– -	Gymnasium; Ypsilanti, MI
December 1924*	Wyandotte	W 27-16	3–0	– -	– -	– -	Gymnasium; Ypsilanti, MI
January 7, 1925	Oakland Motors	L 20-39	3-1	– -	– -	– -	Gymnasium; Ypsilanti, MI
January 9, 1925*	I.M.A. Flint	L 11-34	3–2	– -	– -	– -	Gymnasium; Ypsilanti, MI
January 14, 1925	at Hillsdale	W 33-24	4–2 (1-0)	– -	– -	– -	Hillsdale, MI
January 16, 1925*	Alma	W 34-18	5–2 (2-0)	– -	– -	– -	Gymnasium; Ypsilanti, MI
January 17, 1925*	at Central Michigan	L 23–29	5–3	– -	– -	– -	Central Hall; Mount Pleasant, MI
January 25, 1925	at Olivet	W 30-29	6–3 (3-0)	– -	– -	– -	Olivet, MI
January 27, 1925*	at Detroit YMCA	L 20-29	6–4	– -	– -	– -	Detroit, MI
January 30, 1925	at Albion	W 29-20	7–4 (4-0)	– Pfahler	– -	– -	Albion, MI
February 6, 1925	Alma	L 19-34	7–5 (4-1)	– -	– -	– -	Gymnasium; Ypsilanti, MI
February 7, 1925*	at Kalamazoo	W 40-24	8–5	– -	– -	– -	Kalamazoo, MI
February 11, 1925*	Western Michigan	W 28-22	9–5	– -	– -	– -	Gymnasium; Ypsilanti, MI
February 14, 1925	at Olivet	W 35-20	10–5 (5-1)	– -	– -	– -	Charlotte, M
February 18, 1925	Albion	W 20-14	11–5 (6-1)	– Pfahler	– -	– -	Gymnasium; Ypsilanti, MI
February 20, 1925*	Central Michigan	W 41-17	12–5	– -	– -	– -	Gymnasium; Ypsilanti, MI
February 21, 1925*	at Detroit YMCA	W 28-16	13–5	– -	– -	– -	Detroit, MI
February 25, 1925	at Hillsdale	W 42-35	14-5 (7-1)	– -	– -	– -	Field House; Hillsdale, MI
February 27, 1925*	Oberlin	W 49-23	14–6	– -	– -	– -	Gymnasium; Ypsilanti, MI
March 6, 1925*	at Kalamazoo	W 39-10	15–6	– -	– -	– -	Kalamazoo, MI
March 7, 1925*	at Western Michigan	L 10-39	15–7	– -	– -	– -	East Hall Gymnasium; Kalamazoo, MI
*Non-conference game. (#) Tournament seedings in parentheses. All times are in Eastern Time.
