= 1924–25 Georgia Bulldogs basketball team =

American college basketball team season

1924–25 Georgia Bulldogs basketball
- Conference: Southern Conference
- Record: 9–11 (4–4 SoCon)
- Head coach: Herman Stegeman (6th season)
- Captain: Charlie Wiehrs
- Home arena: Woodruff Hall

1924–25 Southern Conference men's basketball standings
	Conf.				Overall
Team	W		L	PCT	W		L	PCT
North Carolina†	8	–	0	1.000	20	–	5	.800
Tulane	12	–	3	.800	17	–	4	.810
Kentucky	6	–	2	.750	13	–	8	.619
Maryland	3	–	1	.750	12	–	5	.706
Alabama	5	–	2	.714	15	–	4	.789
Virginia	4	–	2	.667	14	–	3	.824
South Carolina	4	–	2	.667	10	–	7	.588
Washington and Lee	3	–	2	.600	8	–	5	.615
Clemson	3	–	2	.600	4	–	14	.222
Vanderbilt	4	–	3	.571	12	–	13	.480
Mississippi A&M	4	–	4	.500	14	–	9	.609
Georgia	4	–	4	.500	9	–	11	.450
Georgia Tech	2	–	7	.222	4	–	12	.250
NC State	1	–	4	.200	11	–	7	.611
LSU	1	–	4	.200	10	–	7	.588
Virginia Tech	1	–	4	.200	6	–	9	.400
Tennessee	1	–	5	.167	6	–	8	.429
Auburn	1	–	5	.167	3	–	11	.214
Mississippi	1	–	6	.143	17	–	8	.680
Florida	0	–	0	–	2	–	7	.222
Sewanee	0	–	0	–	2	–	7	.222
† Southern Conference Tournament winner

The 1924–25 Georgia Bulldogs basketball team represented the University of Georgia as a member of the Southern Conference (SoCon) during the 1924–25 NCAA men's basketball season. Led by sixth-year head coach Herman Stegeman, the Bulldogs compiled an overall record of 9–11 with a mark of 4–4 in conference play, tying for 11th place in the SoCon. The team captain was Charlie Wiehrs.

== Roster ==
1924–25 Georgia Bulldogs men's basketball team
Players
Coaches

Pos.	#	Name	Height	Weight	Year	Previous school	Hometown
		Buster Kilpatrick	—	—
		Nolen Richardson	—	—
		Walter Forbes	—	—
		Charlie Wiehrs	—	—
		Harrell Huguley	—	—
		George Morton	—	—

Head coach

Herman Stegeman

Assistant coach(es)

Legend

- (C) Team captain
- (S) Suspended
- (I) Ineligible
- (W) Walk-on
- Injured
- Current redshirt

== Schedule ==
Date time, TV	Opponent	Result	Record	Site city, state
1/3/1925	at Atlanta YMCA	L 35-41	0–1	
1/5/1925	at Ft. McPherson	W 35-30	1–1	
1/6/1925	at Savannah A.C.	L 33-38	1–2	
1/7/1925	at Savannah Baptist	W 37-23	2–2	
1/8/1925	at Jacksonville	W 33-24	3–2	
1/10/1925	at Albany YMCA	L 31-47	3–3	
1/11/1925	at Columbus YMCA	L 29-32	3–4	
1/15/1925	at Clemson	L 16-18	3–5	Clemson, SC
1/16/1925	at Furman	W 39-26	4–5	Greenville, SC
1/17/1925	at South Carolina	L 27-35	4–6	Columbia, SC
1/22/1925	Vanderbilt	L 34-41	4–7	Athens, GA
1/31/1925	at Georgia Tech	L 25-30	4–8	Atlanta, GA
2/5/1925	at A.A.C.	L 24-27	4–9	
2/7/1925	Kentucky	W 28-24	5–9	Athens, GA
2/10/1925	Auburn	W 40-17	6–9	Athens, GA
2/14/1925	A.A.C.	L 26-38	6–10	Athens, GA
2/18/1925	at Auburn	W 37-21	7–10	Auburn, AL
2/21/1925	Georgia Tech	W 34-24	8–10	Athens, GA
3/1/1925	Kentucky	W 32-31	9–10	Athens, GA
3/2/1925	North Carolina	L 19-40	9–11	Athens, GA
*Non-conference game. (#) Tournament seedings in parentheses.
