= George Haggarty =

American lawyer

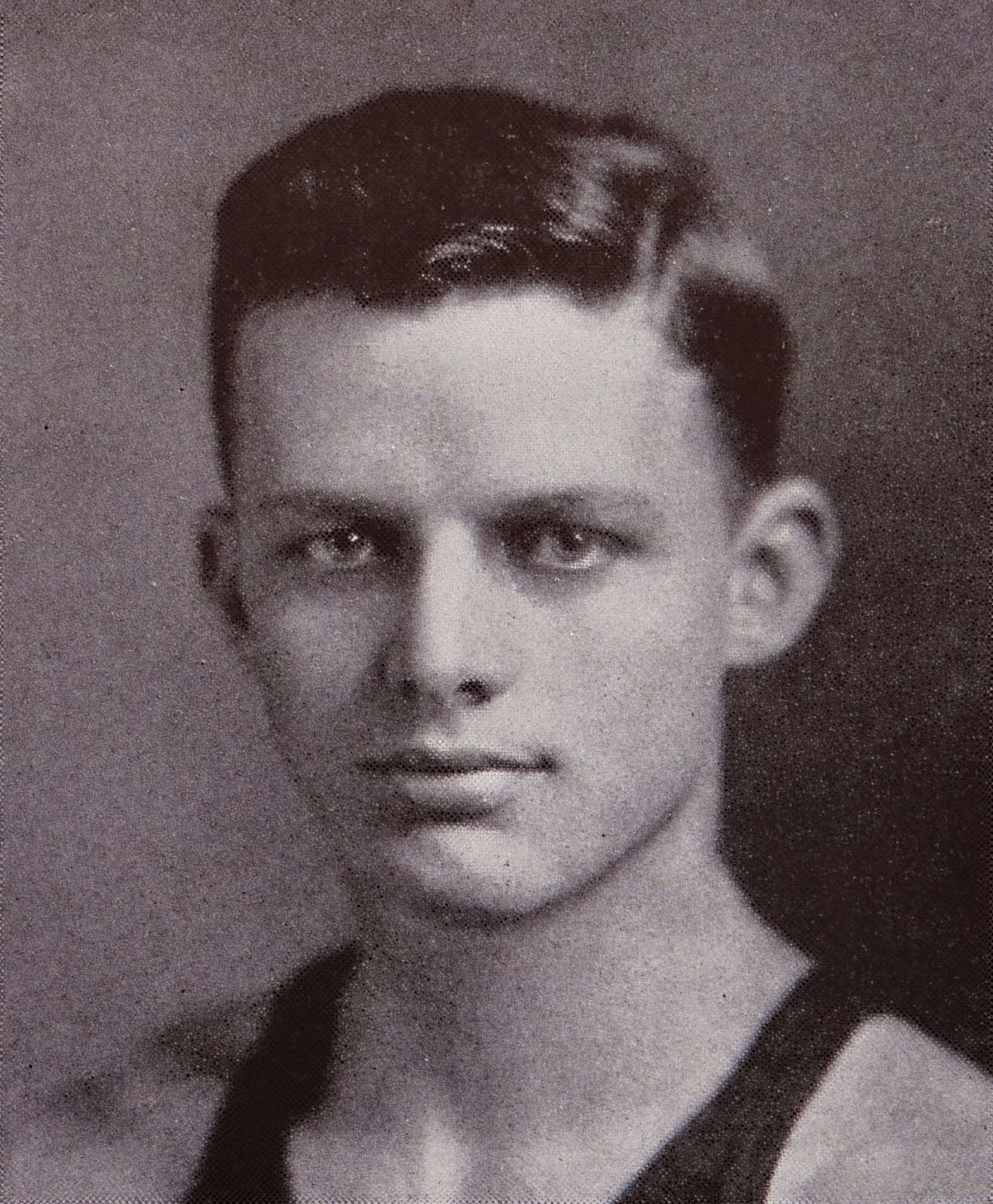
- Haggarty from the 1925 Michiganensian

Personal information
- Born: December 14, 1902 Texas
- Died: April 26, 1971 (aged 68) Miami, Florida
- Listed height: 6 ft 04 in (1.93 m)
- Listed weight: 225 lb (102 kg)

Career information
- College: Michigan

Career highlights
- Mr. Basketball of Michigan, 1921 (retrospective)

George Sylvester Haggarty (December 14, 1902 – April 26, 1971) was an American basketball and baseball player, track athlete, golfer, horse racing advocate, and attorney. As a student at the University of Michigan, he was a member of the Michigan Wolverines men's basketball team from 1922 to 1925. He was the leading scorer on the 1923–24 and 1924–25 teams. He was also the captain of the 1924–25 team. He was the winner of the retrospective Mr. Basketball of Michigan award as the best basketball player in Michigan during 1921. He also won the 1966 United States Seniors' Golf Association championship. He was also an attorney with the Detroit law firm of Dickinson Wright for 20 years.

== Early years ==
Haggarty was born in Texas in 1902. At the time of the 1910 United States Census, Haggarty was living with his parents, Charles S. and Charlotte Haggarty, in Beaumont, Texas. His father was a Michigan native who was employed as a salesman for a lumber mill.

Haggarty moved to Ypsilanti, Michigan, where he lived with his aunt, Ursula Herrick. He attended Ypsilanti High School where he was a star athlete in basketball, baseball and track. As a senior in 1921, Haggarty was selected as an All-State player, scored 105 baskets in 10 games, and led Ypsilanti to finish among the top eight teams in the state. In track, he won the state title in the high and low hurdles during his senior year and finished third in the low hurdles at the national track meet in Chicago. In 2011, the Basketball Coaches Association of Michigan named a retrospective list of winners of the Mr. Basketball award to the persons chosen for each year from 1920 to 1980 as the best basketball player in the State of Michigan. Haggarty was selected as Mr. Basketball for 1921.

== Student athlete at Michigan ==
Haggarty attended the University of Michigan. While attending Michigan, he played three years each for both the baseball and basketball teams. He played at second and third base for the baseball team from 1923 to 1925. He was also a starting forward for the basketball team for three consecutive years from 1922 to 1925. As a junior, he was the leading scorer on the 1923–24 basketball team. As a senior, he was both the captain and leading scorer on the 1924–25 team. He scored 50 points as a sophomore, 161 points (9.5 points a game) as a junior, and 145 points (10.4 points per game) as a senior. After his senior year, one newspaper wrote that Haggarty "was acclaimed the greatest basketball player of the Big Ten and was almost a unanimous selection for the mythical all star cage team." In March 1925, Fred Young of the Chicago Daily Tribune wrote that Haggarty "will go down into history as one of Michigan's best forwards."

While he was a student at Michigan, Haggarty was also a member of the Delta Kappa Epsilon fraternity, Michigamua, the Sphinx, the Board in Control of Athletics, and the Blue Key.

== Later years ==
After receiving his bachelor's degree, Haggarty reportedly played professional basketball for a short time. He then returned to Ann Arbor and enrolled in the University of Michigan law school. He was the president of the law school's Class of 1928.

After receiving his law degree, Haggarty practiced law with the Detroit law firm, Dickinson Wright, for 20 years. At the time of the 1930 United States census, Haggarty was living in Detroit and employed as an attorney. With his wife, Mary Kirk Haggarty, he had a daughter, Anne Kirk, born in 1928, a daughter Martha Adams, born in 1932 and a son, George Adams, born in 1941.

In the late 1940s, Haggarty opened his own law practice. He also invested in real estate in Detroit and mineral interests in Texas. He also purchased the Lake Point Country Club, which later became a municipal golf course, in St. Clair Shores, Michigan. Haggarty remained active as golfer in his later years. He won the United States Seniors' Golf Association championship in 1966 and finished in a three-way tie for the championship in 1967. He lost the 1962 championship after forcing George Dawson into a playoff. Haggarty was also the president of the American Seniors Golf Association.

Haggarty was also an officer of the Michigan Racing Association, a horse racing organization, and a director for Storer Broadcasting Co.

In his later years, Haggarty divided his time between homes in Grosse Pointe Shores, Michigan, and Delray Beach, Florida. In April 1971, Haggarty died from leukemia at the Miami Heart Institute in Miami, Florida.
