= 1924–25 Princeton Tigers men's basketball team =

American college basketball season

1924–25 Princeton Tigers men's basketball
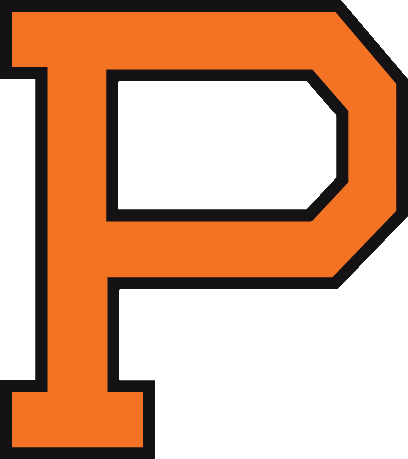

EIBL Champions Helms Foundation National Champions
- Conference: Eastern Intercollegiate Basketball League
- Record: 21–2 (9–1 EIBL)
- Head coach: Albert Wittmer
- Captain: Stephen Cleaves
- Home arena: University Gymnasium

The 1924–25 Princeton Tigers men's basketball team represented Princeton University in intercollegiate college basketball during the 1924–25 NCAA men's basketball season. The head coach was Albert Wittmer and the team captain was Stephen Cleaves. The team played its home games in the University Gymnasium on the university campus in Princeton, New Jersey. The team was the winner of the Eastern Intercollegiate Basketball League (EIBL) and is considered the retroactive national champion by the Helms Athletic Foundation. In addition, the team was retroactivley listed as the top team of the season by the Premo-Porretta Power Poll.

The team posted a 21–2 overall record and a 9–1 conference record. Its only two losses came in road games against Westminster College by a 25–23 margin in the third game of the season on December 27, 1924, and against the Penn Quakers in the final game of the season on March 14, 1925, by a 29–28 score.

Two-time All-American Arthur Loeb set numerous records, including the school record for career free throws made (342) that would stand until Bud Haabestad totaled 376 during his career that ended with the 1954–55 season.
