= 1924–25 Iowa State Cyclones men's basketball team =

American college basketball season

1924–25 Iowa State Cyclones men's basketball
- Conference: Missouri Valley Intercollegiate Athletic Association
- Record: 2–15 (1–15 MVIAA)
- Head coach: Bill Chandler (4th season)
- Home arena: State Gymnasium

1924–25 Missouri Valley Intercollegiate Athletic Association men's basketball standings
	Conf.				Overall
Team	W		L	PCT	W		L	PCT
Kansas	15	–	1	.938	17	–	1	.944
Nebraska	13	–	3	.813	14	–	4	.778
Kansas State	10	–	6	.625	10	–	8	.556
Washington University	10	–	6	.625	10	–	8	.556
Oklahoma	9	–	7	.563	10	–	8	.556
Missouri	6	–	10	.375	7	–	11	.389
Drake	4	–	12	.250	4	–	12	.250
Grinnell	4	–	12	.250	4	–	13	.235
Iowa State	1	–	15	.063	2	–	15	.118

The 1924–25 Iowa State Cyclones men's basketball team (also known informally as Ames) represented Iowa State University during the 1924–25 NCAA men's basketball season. The Cyclones were coached by Bill Chandler, who was in his fourth season with the Cyclones. They played their home games at the State Gymnasium in Ames, Iowa.

They finished the season 2–15, 1–15 in Missouri Valley play to finish in ninth place.

== Roster ==
1924–25 Iowa State Cyclones men's basketball team
Players
Coaches

Pos.	#	Name	Height	Weight	Year	Hometown
F		Ernest Anderson	—	—
G		Lloyd Arnold	—	—
		Baird	—	—
		Benson	—	—
		Roland Coe	—	—
G		Dolan	—	—
		Earl Elliott	—	—		Ames, Iowa
F		R.J. Fisher	—	—
		L.W. Grimes	—	—
		Hill	—	—
C		Tanner Jacobsen	—	—
		Keouba	—	—
		Harold Klingaman	—	—
		Konecky	—	—
		Kowalke	—	—
		McKinley	—	—
G		Aaron Miller	—	—		Waterloo, Iowa
F		Leonard Raff (C)	—	—
C		Stolting	—	—
		Charles Wheeler	—	—
		W.L. Wright	—	—

Head coach

- Bill Chandler

Assistant coach(es)

Legend

- (C) Team captain
- (S) Suspended
- (I) Ineligible
- (W) Walk-on
- Injured
- Current redshirt

== Schedule and results ==
Date time, TV	Rank^{#}	Opponent^{#}	Result	Record	Site city, state
Regular season
December 18, 1924*; 6:45 pm		Cornell	W 21–20	1–0	State Gymnasium; Ames, Iowa
January 8, 1925		Missouri	L 15–28	1–1 (0–1)	State Gymnasium; Ames, Iowa
January 9, 1925		Kansas	L 8–28	1–2 (0–2)	State Gymnasium; Ames, Iowa
January 17, 1925		at Kansas State	L 19–33	1–3 (0–3)	Nichols Hall; Manhattan, Kansas
January 19, 1925		at Oklahoma	L 24–27	1–4 (0–4)	Norman, Oklahoma
January 24, 1925		Grinnell	L 15–32	1–5 (0–5)	State Gymnasium; Ames, Iowa
January 31, 1925		at Drake; Iowa Big Four	L 22–23	1–6 (0–6)	Des Moines Coliseum; Des Moines, Iowa
February 3, 1925		Kansas State	L 20–34	1–7 (0–7)	State Gymnasium; Ames, Iowa
February 6, 1925		at Washington University (MO)	L 17–34	1–8 (0–8)	Francis Gymnasium; St. Louis, Missouri
February 7, 1925		at Missouri	L 15–17	1–9 (0–9)	Rothwell Gymnasium; Columbia, Missouri
February 9, 1925		at Kansas	L 18–33	1–10 (0–10)	Robinson Gymnasium; Lawrence, Kansas
February 14, 1925		Oklahoma	W 22–19	2–10 (1–10)	State Gymnasium; Ames, Iowa
February 17, 1925		at Grinnell	L 22–37	2–11 (1–11)	Grinnell, Iowa
February 24, 1925		at Nebraska	L 17–37	2–12 (1–12)	Grant Memorial Hall; Lincoln, Nebraska
February 28, 1925		Washington (MO)	L 12–32	2–13 (1–13)	State Gymnasium; Ames, Iowa
March 4, 1925		Nebraska	L 13–28	2–14 (1–14)	State Gymnasium; Ames, Iowa
March 6, 1925		Drake; Iowa Big Four	L 19–23	2–15 (1–15)	State Gymnasium; Ames, Iowa
*Non-conference game. ^{#}Rankings from AP poll. (#) Tournament seedings in parentheses. All times are in Central Time.
