= 1926 NCAA Men's Basketball All-Americans =

- Awarded for: 1925–26 NCAA men's basketball season

The 1926 College Basketball All-American team, as chosen retroactively by the Helms Athletic Foundation. The player highlighted in gold was chosen as the Helms Foundation College Basketball Player of the Year retroactively in 1944.

Player	Team
Jack Cobb	North Carolina
George Dixon	California
Richard Doyle	Michigan
Menchy Goldblatt	Pennsylvania
Gale Gordon	Kansas
Vic Hanson	Syracuse
Carl Loeb	Princeton
Al Peterson	Kansas
George Spradling	Purdue
Algot Westergren	Oregon

== See also ==
- 1925–26 NCAA men's basketball season
