= 1924 NCAA Men's Basketball All-Americans =

- Awarded for: 1923–24 NCAA men's basketball season

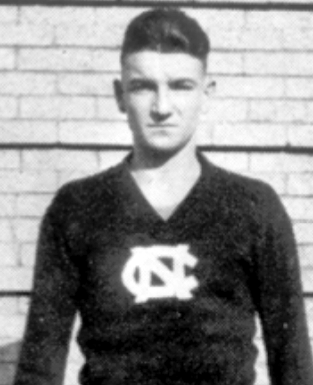
Cartwright Carmichael of North Carolina

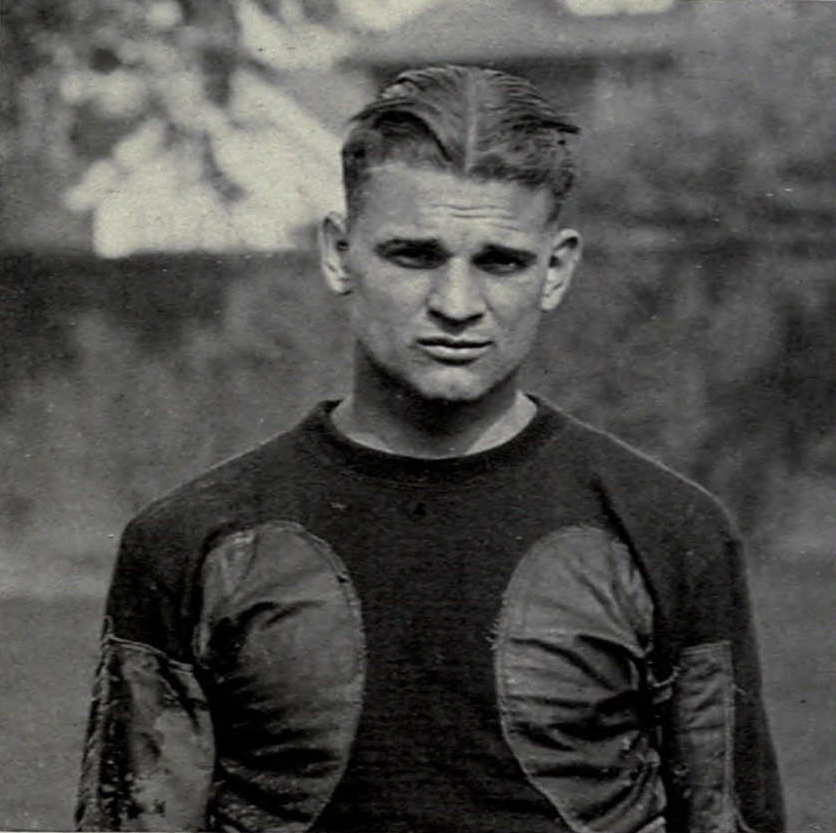
Harry Kipke of Michigan

The 1924 College Basketball All-American team, as chosen retroactively by the Helms Athletic Foundation. The player highlighted in gold was chosen as the Helms Foundation College Basketball Player of the Year retroactively in 1944.

Player	Team
Tusten Ackerman	Kansas
Charlie T. Black	Kansas
Cartwright Carmichael	North Carolina
Jack Cobb	North Carolina
Abb Curtis	Texas
Amory Gill	Oregon Agricultural
Harry Kipke	Michigan
Hugh Latham	Oregon
James Lovley	Creighton
H. W. Middlesworth	Butler

== See also ==
- 1923–24 NCAA men's basketball season
