= Albert Wittmer =

Biographical details
- Born: March 9, 1896; Pittsburgh, Pennsylvania, U.S.
- Died: March 10, 1950 (aged 54); Pittsburgh, Pennsylvania, U.S.

Playing career
- c. 1920: Princeton
- Positions: Halfback, center (football); Guard (basketball)

Coaching career (HC unless noted)

Football
- 1931: Princeton

Basketball
- 1922–1932: Princeton

Head coaching record
- Overall: 1–7 (football); 115–86 (basketball)

Accomplishments and honors

Championships
- 1925 Helms national championship

Albert Wittmer Jr. (March 9, 1896 – March 10, 1950) was an American football and basketball player and coach, lawyer, and state legislator. He was a native of Pittsburgh, Pennsylvania, who attended Allegheny High School and Mercersburg Academy. His father, Albert Wittmer, Sr., was a Pennsylvania native who worked as a butcher in a slaughterhouse. At the time of the 1910 United States census, Wittmer lived in Pittsburgh with his parents, two younger brothers and a younger sister. Wittmer attended Westminster College for one year before enrolling at Princeton University. Wittmer's education was interrupted by military service, as he served in the United States Navy during World War I. Wittmer played college football and basketball at Princeton. He played at the halfback and center positions in football and the guard position in basketball and was selected as the captain of the basketball team in 1921.

After graduating from Princeton, he served as the head coach of the Princeton Tigers men's basketball team for 10 years from 1922 to 1932. His record of 115–86 ranks him as the third winningest basketball coach in Princeton history. His 1924–25 team was retroactively named the national champion by the Helms Athletic Foundation, and the team was also retroactively named as the top team of the season by the Premo-Porretta Power Poll. Wittmer also served as the line coach for the Princeton Tigers football team for nine years from 1922 to 1930. In 1931, he was asked to take over as the head football coach and compiled a record in that capacity of 1–7. After retiring from coaching, Wittmer received a law degree from the University of Pennsylvania. He served in the New Jersey State Legislature in the early 1930s and later practiced law in Princeton, New Jersey. At the time of the 1930 United States census, Wittmer was living in Princeton, New Jersey, with his wife, Leah Wittmer, and their daughter Mary (age 1-10/12) and Margaret (age 3-11/12). His profession at that time was listed as a lawyer in general practice. He died suddenly after suffering a heart attack at his sister's home following a party celebrating his 53rd birthday. He had been living with his sister since poor health had caused him to retire.

== Head coaching record ==
=== Football ===
Year	Team	Overall	Conference	Standing	Bowl/playoffs
Princeton Tigers (Independent) (1931)
1931	Princeton	1–7			
Princeton:		1–7			
Total:		1–7			
