= 1924–25 Kansas Jayhawks men's basketball team =

American college basketball season

1924–25 Kansas Jayhawks men's basketball

MVIAA Champions
- Conference: Missouri Valley Intercollegiate Athletic Association
- Record: 17–1 (15–1 MVIAA)
- Head coach: Phog Allen (8th season)
- Assistant coach: John Bunn (4th season)
- Captain: Tusten Ackerman
- Home arena: Robinson Gymnasium

1924–25 Missouri Valley Intercollegiate Athletic Association men's basketball standings
	Conf.				Overall
Team	W		L	PCT	W		L	PCT
Kansas	15	–	1	.938	17	–	1	.944
Nebraska	13	–	3	.813	14	–	4	.778
Kansas State	10	–	6	.625	10	–	8	.556
Washington University	10	–	6	.625	10	–	8	.556
Oklahoma	9	–	7	.563	10	–	8	.556
Missouri	6	–	10	.375	7	–	11	.389
Drake	4	–	12	.250	4	–	12	.250
Grinnell	4	–	12	.250	4	–	13	.235
Iowa State	1	–	15	.063	2	–	15	.118

The 1924–25 Kansas Jayhawks men's basketball team represented the University of Kansas during the 1924–25 college men's basketball season.

== Roster ==
- Tusten Ackerman
- Wilferd Belgard
- Clifford Campbell
- Vernon Engel
- Gale Gordon
- Ward Hitt
- Albert Peterson
- Harold Schmidt
- William Wilkin
- Harold Zuber

== Schedule ==
Date time, TV	Rank^{#}	Opponent^{#}	Result	Record	Site city, state
January 3*		at Hillyard Chemical Co.	W 19–15	1-0	St. Joseph, MO
January 8		at Grinnell	W 39–26	2-0 (1-0)	Grinnell, IA
January 9		at Iowa State	W 28–8	3-0 (2-0)	State Gymnasium; Ames, IA
January 10		at Drake	W 33–16	4-0 (3-0)	Des Moines Coliseum; Des Moines, IA
January 14		Kansas State; Sunflower Showdown	L 28–40	4-1 (3-1)	Robinson Gymnasium; Lawrence, KS
January 22*		at Kansas City AC	W 41–17	5-1	Clubhouse; Kansas City, MO
January 31		at Nebraska	W 25–20	6-1 (4-1)	Grant Memorial Hall; Lincoln, NE
February 2		Oklahoma	W 34–20	7-1 (5-1)	Robinson Gymnasium; Lawrence, KS
February 9		Iowa State	W 33–18	8-1 (6-1)	Robinson Gymnasium; Lawrence, KS
February 11		Grinnell	W 23–20	9-1 (7-1)	Robinson Gymnasium; Lawrence, KS
February 12		at Washington University (MO)	W 23–22	10-1 (8-1)	Francis Gymnasium; St. Louis, MO
February 14		at Missouri; Border War	W 23–22	11-1 (9-1)	Rothwell Gymnasium; Columbia, MO
February 17		Nebraska	W 28–20	12-1 (10-1)	Robinson Gymnasium; Lawrence, KS
February 19		Drake	W 27–20	13-1 (11-1)	Robinson Gymnasium; Lawrence, KS
February 24		at Kansas State; Sunflower Showdown	W 27–17	14-1 (12-1)	Nichols Hall; Manhattan, KS
February 26		at Oklahoma	W 23–22	15-1 (13-1)	Norman, OK
February 28		Missouri; Border War	W 33–17	16-1 (14-1)	Robinson Gymnasium; Lawrence, KS
March 9		Washington University (MO)	W 27–21	17-1 (15-1)	Robinson Gymnasium; Lawrence, KS
*Non-conference game. ^{#}Rankings from AP Poll. (#) Tournament seedings in parentheses.
