= 1924–25 Indiana State Sycamores men's basketball team =

American college basketball season

1924–25 Indiana State Sycamores men's basketball

Indiana Intercollegiate Conference champions
- Conference: Indiana Intercollegiate Conference
- Record: 11–4 (4-2 Indiana Conference)
- Head coach: David Glascock (1st season)
- Assistant coaches: Art Strum (1st season); Goose Burris (1st season)
- MVP: Pete Van Horn
- Captains: Russell “Red” Willis; Harry Conover
- Home arena: W.H. Wiley High School Gym

The 1924–25 Indiana State Sycamores men's basketball team represented Indiana State University during the 1924–25 NCAA men's basketball season. The head coach was David Glascock, coaching the Sycamores in his first season. The team played their home games at William H. Wiley High School Gymnasium in Terre Haute, Indiana.

== Staff ==
The coaching staff consisted of first year Head Coach David Glascock, assistant coach Art Strum and first year assistant coach Roy "Goose" Burris. Glascock and Strum would remain with Indiana State and craft excellent coaching careers; Burris would build a professional career in the NBL as well as a minor league baseball player.

== Roster ==
The Sycamores were led by “Pete” Van Horn, the team's leading scorer, with an 8.7 average. He was followed by Claude Story's 6.4 average. Future minor league baseball star, Paul Wolf, was the third leading scorer; Wolf would return to Indiana State after his playing days and craft an outstanding career as the baseball coach, winning a number of conference titles.

Six lettermen formed the strength of the fourteen member roster.

== Schedule and results ==
Date time, TV	Rank^{#}	Opponent^{#}	Result	Record	Site city, state
Regular Season
*		Vincennes University	L 30-35	0-1	W.H. Wiley High Gymnasium; Terre Haute, Indiana
*		at Indiana univ	W 28-24	1-1	Men's Gymnasium; Bloomington, Indiana
		DePauw	L 20-27	1-2	W.H.Wiley High Gymnasium; Terre Haute, Indiana
*		at Saint Louis Billikens	L 21-30	1-3	Saint Louis, Missouri
*		at Canterbury	W 36-35	2-3	Danville, Indiana
*		Concordia-St. Louis	W 47-40	3-3	W.H. Wiley High Gymnasium; Terre Haute, Indiana
		Rose Poly Tech	W 48-8	4-3	W.H. Wiley High Gymnasium; Terre Haute, Indiana
*		at Earlham College (IN)	W 33-26	5-3	Richmond, Indiana
*		at Concordia-St. Louis	W 27-19	6-3	Clayton, Missouri
		Earlham College (IN)	L 25-49	6-4	Richmond, Indiana
*		Oakland City College (IN)	W 58-22	7-4 (0-1)	Oakland City, Indiana
		DePauw	W 35-29	8-4 (2-1)	Greencastle, Indiana
		Rose Poly Tech	W 50-12	9-4 (2-2)	W.H. Wiley High Gymnasium; Terre Haute, Indiana
		Canterbury	W 25-15	11-4 (3-2)	W.H. Wiley High Gymnasium; Terre Haute, Indiana
		Oakland City College (IN)	W 39-22	11-4 (3-2)	W.H. Wiley High Gymnasium; Terre Haute, Indiana
*Non-conference game. (#) Tournament seedings in parentheses.
