= 1924–25 Niagara Purple Eagles men's basketball team =

American college basketball season

1924–25 Niagara Purple Eagles men's basketball
- Conference: Independent
- Record: 12–7
- Head coach: Pete Dwyer (2nd season)

The 1924–25 Niagara Purple Eagles men's basketball team represented Niagara University during the 1924–25 NCAA college men's basketball season. The head coach was Pete Dwyer, coaching his second season with the Purple Eagles.

== Schedule ==
| Date time, TV | Opponent | Result | Record | Site city, state |
|---|---|---|---|---|
| | Tuscarora Indians | W 26–24 | 1–0 | Lewiston, NY |
| | Rochester Opt. | W 34–13 | 2–0 | Lewiston, NY |
| | Alfred | W 33–23 | 3–0 | Lewiston, NY |
| 1/25/1925 | St. Bonaventure | W 22–21 | 4–0 | Lewisburg, NY |
| | Mechanical Inst. | W 37–14 | 5–0 | Lewiston, NY |
| | John Carroll | W 35–24 | 6–0 | Lewiston, NY |
| | Davis & Elkins | L 21–31 | 6–1 | Lewiston, NY |
| 2/11/1925 | Syracuse | L 20–35 | 6–2 | Lewiston, NY |
| 2/15/1925 | at St. Bonaventure | L 15–31 | 6–3 | Butler Gym; Olean, NY |
| | Alfred | L 24–25 | 6–4 | Lewisburg, NY |
| | Rochester Opt. | W 25–16 | 7–4 | Lewiston, NY |
| | Clarkson Tech | W 20–14 | 8–4 | Lewiston, NY |
| | St. Lawrence | L 14–28 | 8–5 | Lewiston, NY |
| 2/24/1925 | Canisius | L 17–24 | 8–6 | Lewiston, NY |
| | St. Lawrence | L 17–26 | 8–7 | Lewiston, NY |
| | Tuscarora Indians | W 40–27 | 9–7 | Lewiston, NY |
| | Hobart | W 39–37 | 10–7 | Lewiston, NY |
| | Mechanical Inst. | W 47–23 | 11–7 | Lewiston, NY |
| 3/08/1925 | Canisius | W 29–21 | 12–7 | Lewiston, NY |
*Non-conference game. (#) Tournament seedings in parentheses.
