= 1924–25 Illinois Fighting Illini men's basketball team =

American college basketball season

1924–25 Illinois Fighting Illini men's basketball
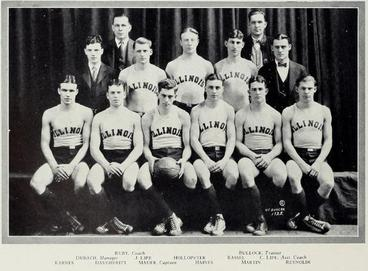
- Conference: Big Ten Conference
- Record: 11–6 (8–4 Big Ten)
- Head coach: J. Craig Ruby (3rd season)
- Assistant coach: Jack Lipe (1st season)
- Captain: John Mauer
- Home arena: Kenney Gym

1924–25 Big Ten Conference men's basketball standings
	Conf.				Overall
Team	W		L	PCT	W		L	PCT
Ohio State	11	–	1	.917	14	–	2	.875
Indiana	8	–	4	.667	12	–	5	.706
Illinois	8	–	4	.667	11	–	6	.647
Purdue	7	–	4	.636	9	–	5	.643
Michigan	6	–	5	.545	8	–	6	.571
Minnesota	6	–	6	.500	9	–	7	.563
Iowa	5	–	7	.417	6	–	10	.375
Northwestern	4	–	8	.333	6	–	11	.353
Wisconsin	3	–	9	.250	6	–	11	.353
Chicago	1	–	11	.083	3	–	14	.176

The 1924–25 Illinois Fighting Illini men's basketball team represented the University of Illinois.

== Regular season ==
The 1924–25 season for Fighting Illini coach, Craig Ruby, had an identical record both overall as well as within the conference as the previous season. Both seasons finished with overall records of 11 wins and 6 losses with 8 wins and 4 losses within the conference. The 1924–25 Fighting Illini tied for third place within the conference. Huff Hall's construction was completed in 1925 and this season was the Illini's final full season in Kenney Gym. The starting lineup included captain John Mauer, Jack Lipe and Leonard Haines at guard, T.D. Karnes and Russell Daugherity at forward, with Hollie Martin at center.

=== Roster ===
1924–25 Illinois Fighting Illini men's basketball team
Players
Coaches

Pos.	#	Name	Height	Weight	Year	Hometown
F	1	John Mauer (C)	—	—	Jr	Batavia, Illinois
G	2	Leonard Haines	—	—	Jr	Belvidere, Illinois
F	3	Russell Daugherity	—	—	So	Streator, Illinois
F	4	Hollie Martin	—	—	Jr	Perrysville, Indiana
G	5	Jack Lipe	—	—	Jr	Decatur, Illinois
G	6	Kenneth L. Reynolds	—	—	So	Villa Grove, Illinois
C	7	George Rea	—	—	So	Urbana, Illinois
F	8	William Summerland Weeks	—	—	So	Detroit, Minnesota
F	10	T. Don Karnes	—	—	Sr	Fairbury, Illinois
G	11	Cecil F. Hollopeter	—	—	Sr	Spencerville, Indiana
F	12	Willis J. Tewksbury	—	—	Jr	Lyons, Illinois
F	13	Donald C. Seaton	—	—	So	El Paso, Illinois
F	14	William Jennings Barmore	—	—	So	Villa Grove, Illinois
G	15	Chas Kassel	—	—	So	Melrose Park, Illinois

Head coach

- Craig Ruby (University of Missouri) (3rd year)

Assistant coach(es)

- Jack Lipe (Player/Coach)

Legend

- (C) Team captain
- (S) Suspended
- (I) Ineligible
- (W) Walk-on
- Injured
- Current redshirt

Roster

== Schedule ==
Date time, TV	Rank^{#}	Opponent^{#}	Result	Record	Site (attendance) city, state
Non-Conference regular season
12/13/1924*		Depauw	W 27–23	1-0	Kenney Gym (4,288); Urbana, IL
12/19/1924*		Washington University	W 36–19	2-0	Kenney Gym (3,969); Urbana, IL
12/30/1924*		at Butler	L 22–24	2-1	Butler Gymnasium (-); Indianapolis, IN
1/2/1925*		Kentucky	W 36–26	3-1	Kenney Gym (4,381); Urbana, IL
Big Ten regular season
1/10/1925		at University of Chicago	W 27–16	4-1 (1-0)	Bartlett Gymnasium (2,695); Chicago, IL
1/14/1925		at Northwestern; Rivalry	W 27–16	5-1 (2-0)	Patten Gymnasium (-); Evanston, IL
1/17/1925		Indiana; Rivalry	W 34–24	6-1 (3-0)	Kenney Gym (4,722); Urbana, IL
1/24/1925		Iowa; Rivalry	W 23–15	7-1 (4-0)	Kenney Gym (4,725); Urbana, IL
2/7/1925*		at Notre Dame	L 18–29	7-2	Notre Dame Fieldhouse (-); Notre Dame, IN
2/12/1925		Northwestern; Rivalry	W 30–20	8-2 (5-0)	Kenney Gym (4,710); Urbana, IL
2/14/1925		University of Chicago	W 19–15	9-2 (6-0)	Kenney Gym (4,712); Urbana, IL
2/21/1925		Wisconsin	W 35–25	10-2 (7-0)	Kenney Gym (4,714); Urbana, IL
2/23/1925		at Indiana; Rivalry	L 24–30	10-3 (7-1)	Men's Gymnasium (-); Bloomington, IN
2/27/1925		Iowa; Rivalry	L 25–33	10-4 (7-2)	Iowa Armory (-); Iowa City, IA
3/2/1925		at Purdue	L 18–34	10-5 (7-3)	Memorial Gymnasium (-); West Lafayette, IN
3/6/1925		Purdue	W 37–27	11-5 (8-3)	Kenney Gym (4,713); Urbana, IL
3/9/1925		at Wisconsin	L 9–24	11-6 (8-4)	University of Wisconsin Armory and Gymnasium (-); Madison, WI
*Non-conference game. ^{#}Rankings from AP Poll. (#) Tournament seedings in parentheses. All times are in Central Time.
