= 1924–25 Duke Blue Devils men's basketball team =

American college basketball season

1924–25 Duke Blue Devils men's basketball
- Conference: Independent
- Record: 4–9
- Head coach: George Buchheit (1st season)
- Captain: Ed Bullock
- Home arena: Alumni Memorial Gymnasium

The 1924–25 Duke Blue Devils men's basketball team represented Duke University during the 1924–25 men's college basketball season. The head coach was George Buchheit, coaching his first season with the Blue Devils. The team finished with an overall record of 4–9.

== Schedule ==
Date time, TV	Opponent	Result	Record	Site city, state
*	at Davidson	L 22–39	0–1	
*	Davidson	L 18–22	0–2	Alumni Memorial Gym; Durham, NC
*	Durham Elks	W 48–38	1–2	Alumni Memorial Gym; Durham, NC
1/9/1925*	at Davidson	L 25–27	1–3	
1/12/1925*	Guilford	W 34–22	2–3	Alumni Memorial Gym; Durham, N.C.
1/17/1925*	at N.C. State	L 22–29	2–4	
1/24/1925*	North Carolina	L 21–25	2–5	
1/31/1925*	at Wake Forest	L 18–43	2–6	
2/5/1925*	at William and Mary	L 15–23	2–7	
2/7/1925*	at Richmond	L 25–35	2–8	
2/11/1925*	William and Mary	W 21–16	3–8	Alumni Memorial Gym; Durham, N.C.
2/14/1925*	North Carolina	L 18–34	3–9	Chapel Hill, NC
2/24/1925*	Wake Forest	W 28–25	4–9	Alumni Memorial Gym; Durham, NC
*Non-conference game. (#) Tournament seedings in parentheses.
