= Talbert D. Jessuppe =

American football and basketball coach (1899–1965)

Biographical details
- Born: February 3, 1899; Richmond, Indiana, U.S.
- Died: December 2, 1965 (aged 66); Honey Grove, Texas, U.S.

Coaching career (HC unless noted)

Football
- 1921: Washington HS (IN)
- 1925: Northern Arizona

Basketball
- 1925–1926: Northern Arizona

Head coaching record
- Overall: 2–3–1 (college football); 5–8 (college basketball)

Talbert D. Jessuppe (February 3, 1899 – December 28, 1965) was an American football and basketball coach. He served as the head football coach at Northern Arizona State Teacher's College—now known as Northern Arizona University—in 1925, compiling a record of 2–3–1. Jessuppe was also school's head basketball coach in 1925–26, tallying a mark of 5–8.

== Head coaching record ==
=== College football ===
Year	Team	Overall	Conference	Standing	Bowl/playoffs
Northern Arizona Lumberjacks (Independent) (1925)
1925	Northern Arizona	2–3–1			
Northern Arizona:		2–3–1			
Total:		2–3–1			
