= 1924–25 Wisconsin Badgers men's basketball team =

American college basketball season

1924–25 Wisconsin Badgers men's basketball
- Conference: Big Ten Conference
- Record: 6–11 (3–9 Big Ten)
- Head coach: Walter Meanwell
- Home arena: Red Gym

1924–25 Big Ten Conference men's basketball standings
	Conf.				Overall
Team	W		L	PCT	W		L	PCT
Ohio State	11	–	1	.917	14	–	2	.875
Indiana	8	–	4	.667	12	–	5	.706
Illinois	8	–	4	.667	11	–	6	.647
Purdue	7	–	4	.636	9	–	5	.643
Michigan	6	–	5	.545	8	–	6	.571
Minnesota	6	–	6	.500	9	–	7	.563
Iowa	5	–	7	.417	6	–	10	.375
Northwestern	4	–	8	.333	6	–	11	.353
Wisconsin	3	–	9	.250	6	–	11	.353
Chicago	1	–	11	.083	3	–	14	.176

The 1924–25 Wisconsin Badgers men's basketball team represented University of Wisconsin–Madison. The head coach was Walter Meanwell, coaching his eleventh season with the Badgers. The team played their home games at the Red Gym in Madison, Wisconsin and was a member of the Big Ten Conference.

== Schedule ==
Date time, TV	Rank^{#}	Opponent^{#}	Result	Record	Site city, state
Regular Season
12/12/1924*		Millikin (IN)	W 21–20	1–0	Red Gym; Madison, Wisconsin
12/19/1924*		Butler	L 16–22	1–1	Red Gym; Madison, Wisconsin
12/22/1924*		Grinnell	W 29–15	2–1	Red Gym; Madison, Wisconsin
1/06/1925*		DePauw (IN)	W 27–22	3–1	Red Gym; Madison, Wisconsin
1/10/1925		at Minnesota	L 14–16	3–2 (0–1)	Minnesota Armory; Minneapolis
1/13/1925		Ohio State	L 20–27	3–3 (0–2)	Red Gym; Madison, Wisconsin
1/19/1925		at Michigan	L 12–14	3–4 (0–3)	Fielding H. Yost Fieldhouse; Ann Arbor, Michigan
1/24/1925		Minnesota	L 14–25	3–5 (0–4)	Red Gym; Madison, Wisconsin
2/11/1925*		Franklin (IN)	L 11–26	3–6	Red Gym; Madison, Wisconsin
2/16/1925		Iowa	W 16–15	4–6 (1–4)	Red Gym; Madison, Wisconsin
2/21/1925		at Illinois	L 25–35	4–7 (1–5)	Kenney Gym; Urbana, Illinois
2/23/1925		Purdue	L 22–30	4–8 (1–6)	Red Gym; Madison, Wisconsin
2/28/1925		Michigan	L 16–27	4–9 (1–7)	Red Gym; Madison, Wisconsin
3/03/1925		at Iowa	W 25–23	5–9 (2–7)	Iowa Armory; Iowa City, IA
3/09/1925		Illinois	W 24–9	6–9 (3–7)	Red Gym; Madison, Wisconsin
3/12/1925		at Purdue	L 26–32	6–10 (3–8)	Memorial Gymnasium; West Lafayette, Indiana
3/14/1925		at Ohio State	L 23–37	6–11 (3–9)	Ohio Expo Center Coliseum; Columbus, Ohio
*Non-conference game. ^{#}Rankings from AP Poll. (#) Tournament seedings in parentheses.
