= Vic Hanson =

American athlete and football coach (1903–1982)

Biographical details
- Born: July 30, 1903; Sacramento, California, U.S.
- Died: April 10, 1982 (aged 78); Minoa, New York, U.S.

Playing career

Football
- 1924–1926: Syracuse

Basketball
- 1924–1927: Syracuse
- Position: End (football)

Coaching career (HC unless noted)

Football
- 1928–1929: Syracuse (assistant)
- 1930–1936: Syracuse

Head coaching record
- Overall: 33–21–5

Accomplishments and honors

Awards
- Football: Consensus All-American (1926); Third-team All-American (1925); 2× First-team All-Eastern (1925, 1926); Basketball: 3× All-American (1925, 1926, 1927); Helms Foundation Player of the Year (1927); No. 8 retired by Syracuse Orange
- College Football Hall of Fame; Inducted in 1973 (profile)
- Basketball Hall of Fame; Inducted in 1960 (profile)
- College Basketball Hall of Fame; Inducted in 2006

Victor Arthur Hanson (July 30, 1903 – April 10, 1982) was an American football player and coach, basketball player, and baseball player. A three-sport college athlete, he played football, basketball, and baseball at Syracuse University in the 1920s, serving as team captain in all three sports. The Watertown, New York, native was named a Basketball All-American three times—in 1925, 1926, and 1927—by the Helms Athletic Foundation and was a consensus selection to the 1926 College Football All-America Team.

Following his college career he played briefly with the Cleveland Rosenblums in the American Basketball League and then briefly formed a basketball team, the Syracuse All-Americans. He was also signed by the New York Yankees of Major League Baseball upon graduation from Syracuse in 1927 and played one year in their farm system. Hanson served as the head football coach at his alma mater from 1930 to 1936, compiling a record of 33–21–5. He is only player inducted into both the Naismith Memorial Basketball Hall of Fame and the College Football Hall of Fame.

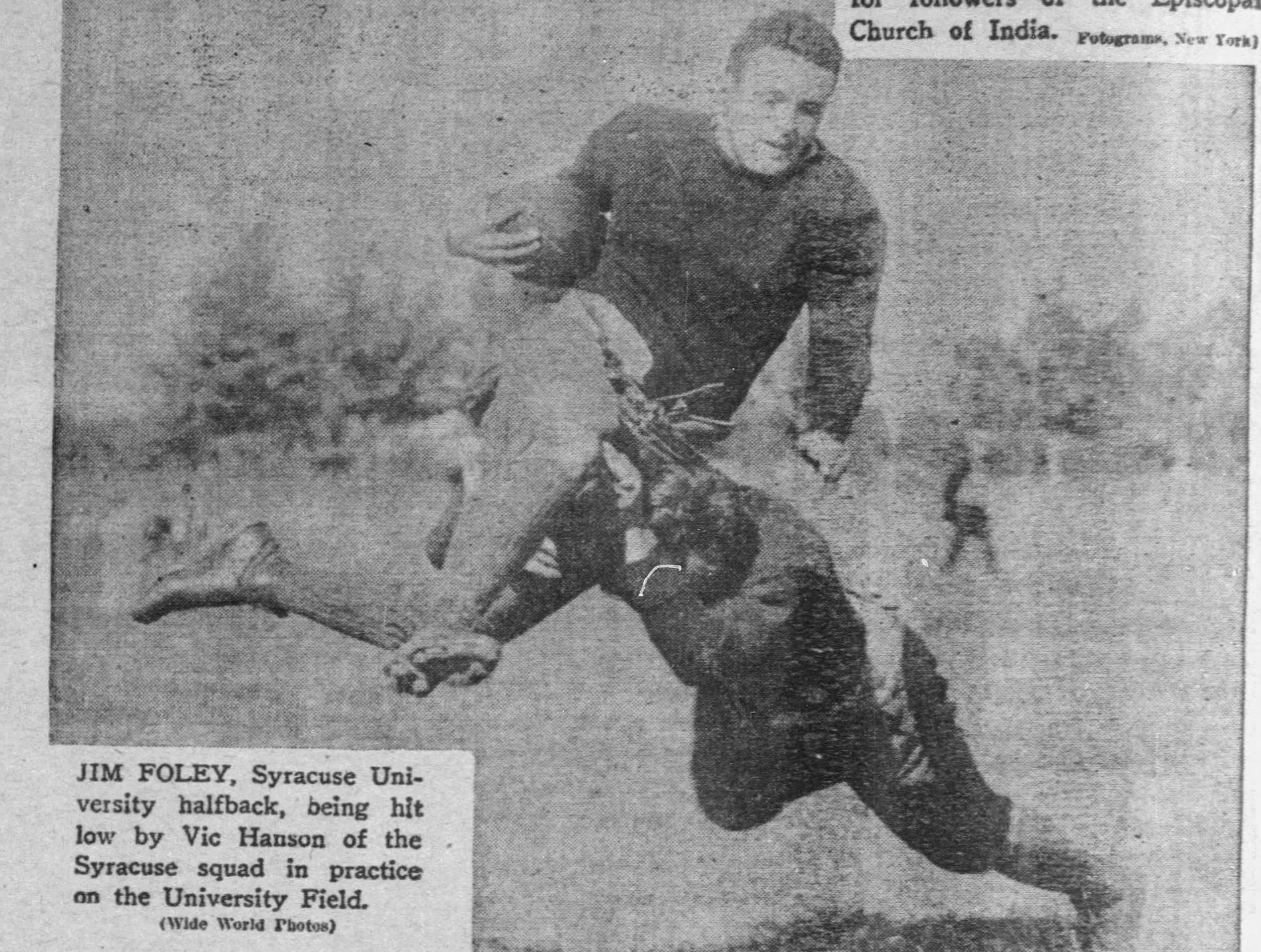
Jim Foley of Syracuse tackled in practice by Vic Hanson, 1924.

== Head coaching record ==
| Year | Team | Overall | Conference | Standing | Bowl/playoffs |
|---|---|---|---|---|---|
Syracuse Orangemen (Independent) (1930–1936)
| 1930 | Syracuse | 5–2–2 | | | |
| 1931 | Syracuse | 7–1–1 | | | |
| 1932 | Syracuse | 4–4–1 | | | |
| 1933 | Syracuse | 4–4 | | | |
| 1934 | Syracuse | 6–2 | | | |
| 1935 | Syracuse | 6–1–1 | | | |
| 1936 | Syracuse | 1–7 | | | |
| Syracuse: | | 33–21–5 | | | |
| Total: | | 33–21–5 | | | |
