= 1924–25 Michigan Wolverines men's basketball team =

American college basketball season

1924–25 Michigan Wolverines men's basketball
- Conference: Big Ten Conference
- Record: 8–6 (6–5 Big Ten)
- Head coach: E. J. Mather
- Captain: George Haggarty
- Home arena: Yost Field House

1924–25 Big Ten Conference men's basketball standings
	Conf.				Overall
Team	W		L	PCT	W		L	PCT
Ohio State	11	–	1	.917	14	–	2	.875
Indiana	8	–	4	.667	12	–	5	.706
Illinois	8	–	4	.667	11	–	6	.647
Purdue	7	–	4	.636	9	–	5	.643
Michigan	6	–	5	.545	8	–	6	.571
Minnesota	6	–	6	.500	9	–	7	.563
Iowa	5	–	7	.417	6	–	10	.375
Northwestern	4	–	8	.333	6	–	11	.353
Wisconsin	3	–	9	.250	6	–	11	.353
Chicago	1	–	11	.083	3	–	14	.176

The 1923–24 Michigan Wolverines men's basketball team represented the University of Michigan in intercollegiate basketball during the 1923–24 season. The team compiled a record of 10–7, and 6–5 against Big Ten Conference opponents. Michigan finished fifth in the Big Ten. Ohio State won the Big ten championship with a record of 10–1, the only loss being a 39–29 game against Michigan. E. J. Mather was in his sixth year as the team's coach, and George Haggarty was the team captain and leading scorer.

== Schedule ==
Date	Opponent	Score	Result	Location
December 13, 1924	Michigan Agricultural	26–10	Win	Yost Field House, Ann Arbor, MI
December 20, 1924	Kentucky	21–11	Win	Lexington, KY
January 2, 1925	Navy	31–29	Loss	Yost Field House, Ann Arbor, MI
January 10, 1925	Northwestern	29–16	Win	Yost Field House, Ann Arbor, MI
January 14, 1925	Purdue	37–36	Loss	Lafayette, IN
January 17, 1925	Ohio State	39–29	Win	Yost Field House, Ann Arbor, MI
January 19, 1925	Wisconsin	14–12	Win	Yost Field House, Ann Arbor, MI
February 7, 1925	Chicago	20–19	Loss	Bartlett Gymnasium, Chicago, IL
February 9, 1925	Northwestern	17–16	Win	Evanston, IL
February 14, 1925	Indiana	29–28	Loss	Yost Field House, Ann Arbor, MI
February 16, 1925	Ohio State	32–13	Loss	Columbus, OH
February 20, 1925	Wisconsin	27–16	Win	Madison, WI
March 2, 1925	Indiana	51–33	Loss	Bloomington, IN
March 7, 1925	Chicago	47–14	Win	Yost Field House, Ann Arbor, MI

== Players ==
- Edward W. Chambers, Niles, Michigan - forward and varsity letter winner
- Royal F. Cherry, Grand Rapids, Michigan - guard and varsity letter winner
- Richard F. Doyle, Galesburg, Michigan - center and varsity letter winner
- Douglas R. Ginn, Detroit, Michigan - aMa letter winner
- Bruce Robert Gregory
- George Haggarty, Ypsilanti, Michigan - team captain, forward and varsity letter winner
- Raymond E. Hutzel, Ann Arbor, Michigan - forward and varsity letter winner
- Carl C. Kressbach, Monroe, Michigan - aMa letter winner
- Franklin C. Kuenzel, Grand Rapids, Michigan - aMa letter winner
- Walter A. Kuenzel, Grand Rapids, Michigan - forward and varsity letter winner
- Joseph M. Landre, Binghamton, New York - guard and varsity letter winner
- Edward D. Line, Detroit, Michigan -
- Nathan Rasnick, Newark, New Jersey - aMa letter winner
- Rex G. Reason, Detroit, Michigan - forward and varsity letter winner

== Scoring statistics ==
Player	Games	Field goals	Free throws	Points	Points per game
George Haggarty	14	58	29	145	10.4
Edward Chambers	13	24	10	58	4.5
Richard Doyle	14	22	12	56	4.0
Royal Cherry	13	10	19	39	3.0
Rex Reason	10	12	10	34	3.4
Bruce Gregory	6	12	7	31	5.2
Raymond Hutzel	8	6	9	21	2.6
Joseph Landre	8	6	4	16	2.0
Edward Line	4	3	3	9	2.3
Franklin Kuenzel	2	1	2	4	2.0
Douglas Ginn	2	0	1	1	0.5
Nathan Rasnick	3	0	0	0	0.0
Carl Kressbach	1	0	0	0	0.0
Totals	14	154	106	414	29.6

== Coaching staff ==
- E. J. Mather - coach
- Justin S. Compton - manager
- Fielding H. Yost - athletic director
