= 1925 Southern Conference men's basketball tournament =

- Classification: Division I
- Teams: 19
- Site: Municipal Auditorium; Atlanta, GA
- Champions: North Carolina Tar Heels (3rd title)
- Winning coach: Monk McDonald (1st title)
- Top scorer: Jack Cobb (North Carolina) (67 points)

1924–25 Southern Conference men's basketball standings
	Conf.				Overall
Team	W		L	PCT	W		L	PCT
North Carolina†	8	–	0	1.000	20	–	5	.800
Tulane	12	–	3	.800	17	–	4	.810
Kentucky	6	–	2	.750	13	–	8	.619
Maryland	3	–	1	.750	12	–	5	.706
Alabama	5	–	2	.714	15	–	4	.789
Virginia	4	–	2	.667	14	–	3	.824
South Carolina	4	–	2	.667	10	–	7	.588
Washington and Lee	3	–	2	.600	8	–	5	.615
Clemson	3	–	2	.600	4	–	14	.222
Vanderbilt	4	–	3	.571	12	–	13	.480
Mississippi A&M	4	–	4	.500	14	–	9	.609
Georgia	4	–	4	.500	9	–	11	.450
Georgia Tech	2	–	7	.222	4	–	12	.250
NC State	1	–	4	.200	11	–	7	.611
LSU	1	–	4	.200	10	–	7	.588
Virginia Tech	1	–	4	.200	6	–	9	.400
Tennessee	1	–	5	.167	6	–	8	.429
Auburn	1	–	5	.167	3	–	11	.214
Mississippi	1	–	6	.143	17	–	8	.680
Florida	0	–	0	–	2	–	7	.222
Sewanee	0	–	0	–	2	–	7	.222
† Southern Conference Tournament winner

The 1925 Southern Conference men's basketball tournament took place from February 26–March 3, 1925, at Municipal Auditorium in Atlanta, Georgia. The North Carolina Tar Heels won their third Southern Conference title, led by head coach Monk McDonald.

== Bracket ==
First round February 26
Maryland	27
Alabama	21
South Carolina	25
Virginia	31
VPI	13
North Carolina	42

Second round February 27
Maryland	16
NC State	30
Washington and Lee	20
Tulane	37
VMI	20
Mississippi	27
Virginia	29
Auburn	27
Georgia
Clemson	Withdrew
Kentucky	31
Mississippi A&M	26
Sewanee	14
Georgia Tech	31
North Carolina	35
LSU	21

Quarterfinals; February 28
NC State	24
Tulane	41
Mississippi	32
Virginia	24
Georgia	32
Kentucky	31
Georgia Tech	26
North Carolina	34

Semifinals; March 2
Tulane	44
Mississippi	23
Georgia	19
North Carolina	40

Finals; March 3
Tulane	28
North Carolina	36

* Overtime game

=== Championship ===
March 3

Tulane 28, North Carolina 36
Pts: Ellis Henican 10	Pts: Sam McDonald 13

Municipal Auditorium, Atlanta, Georgia
Referees: Stanley Sutton

== All-Southern tournament team ==
Player	Position	Class	Team
Howard Holland	G	Senior	Virginia
Carl Lind	G	Senior	Tulane
Jack Cobb	F	Junior	North Carolina
C. Ellis Henican	F	Senior	Tulane
Billie Izard	F	Senior	Mississippi A&M
Ed Morgan	C	Junior	Tulane
Charles Wiehrs	C	Junior	Georgia

== See also ==
- List of Southern Conference men's basketball champions
