= 1924–25 Loyola Ramblers men's basketball team =

American college basketball season

1924–25 Loyola Ramblers men's basketball
- Conference: Independent
- Record: 4–11
- Head coach: Leonard Sachs (2nd season)
- Home arena: Alumni Gym

The 1924–25 Loyola Ramblers men's basketball team represented Loyola University Chicago during the 1924–25 NCAA men's basketball season. The ramblers were led by second-year head coach Leonard Sachs. The team had finished the season with an overall record of 4–11.

== Schedule ==
Date time, TV	Opponent	Result	Record	Site city, state
*	Lawrence	L 11–22	0–1	Alumni Gym; Chicago, IL
*	Western Michigan	L 12–20	0–2	Alumni Gym; Chicago, IL
*	Lewis	W 23–11	1–2	Alumni Gym
*	Saint Louis	L 11–23	1–3	Alumni Gym; Chicago, IL
*	Arkansas State	W 27–11	2–3	Alumni Gym; Chicago, IL
*	at Notre Dame	L 22–40	2–4	Notre Dame Fieldhouse; South Bend, IN
*	Marquette	L 17–19	2–5	Alumni Gym; Chicago, IL
*	Lake Forest	W 33–11	3–5	Alumni Gym; Chicago, IL
*	St. Viator's	L 15–25	3–6	Alumni Gym; Chicago, IL
*	Western Michigan	L 18–19	3–7	Alumni Gym; Chicago, IL
*	Detroit	W 28–18	4–7	Alumni Gym; Chicago, IL
*	St. Viator's	L 12–27	4–8	Alumni Gym; Chicago, IL
*	Marquette	L 6–26	4–9	Alumni Gym; Chicago, IL
*	Notre Dame	L 11–19	4–10	Alumni Gym; Chicago, IL
*	Indiana State	L 19–38	4–11	Alumni Gym; Chicago, IL
*Non-conference game. (#) Tournament seedings in parentheses.
