= Earl Mueller =

American basketball player

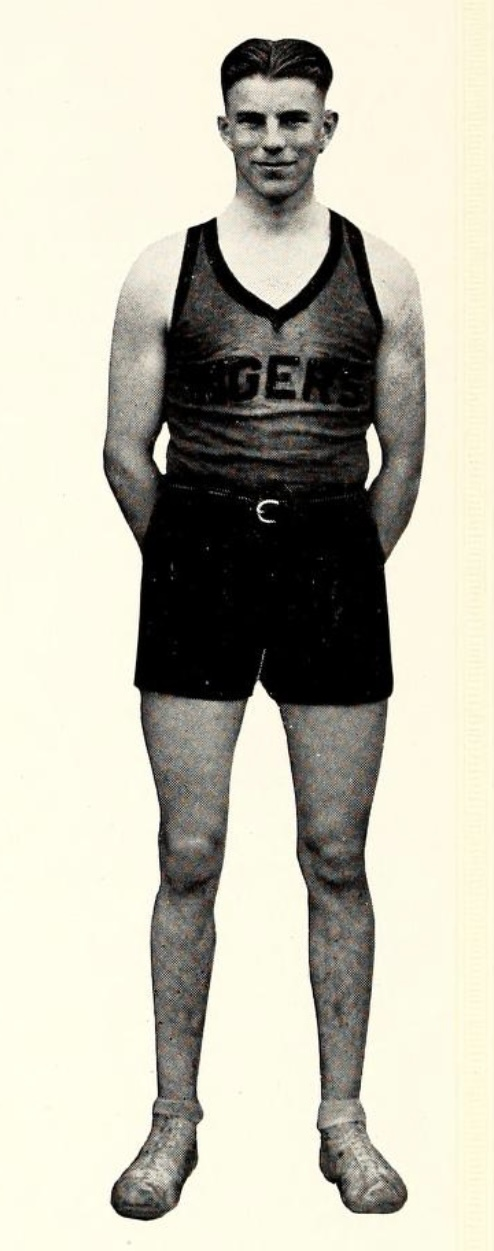
- Mueller at Colorado College in 1924

Personal information
- Born: c.1903 St. Joseph, Missouri, U.S.
- Died: June 4, 1932; St. Joseph, Missouri, U.S.

Career information
- High school: Central (St. Joseph, Missouri)
- College: Colorado College (1923–1925)
- Position: Center

Career highlights
- Helms Player of the Year (1925); Helms Foundation All-American (1925)

Earl Edmond "Dutch" Mueller (died June 4, 1932) was an American college basketball player. He was the 1925 national player of the year as a center at Colorado College.

Mueller, from Saint Joseph, Missouri, was an early college basketball standout at Colorado College in Colorado Springs, Colorado. He played two seasons for the Tigers, leading the team to two Colorado–Wyoming Conference titles. Mueller played the center position and was known for his ball-handling and pivot play. He was retroactively named an All-American and national player of the year for 1925 by the Helms Athletic Foundation in 1943.

Following the completion of his college career, Mueller returned to his hometown and played Amateur Athletic Union basketball with Hillyard, Inc. Mueller won an AAU championship with Hillyard in 1926.

Mueller died in 1932 after an appendix operation. He was inducted into the National Association of Intercollegiate Athletics (NAIA) Hall of Fame in 1952.
