= Menchy Goldblatt =

American basketball player and coach

Personal information
- Born: November 3, 1904
- Died: May 1, 1994 (aged 89) Boulder, Colorado, U.S.
- Listed height: 5 ft 10 in (1.78 m)
- Listed weight: 145 lb (66 kg)

Career information
- College: Penn (1924–1927)

Career history

Coaching
- 1940s: John Bartam HS
- 1948–1952: Philadelphia Textile

Career highlights
- 2× Helms All-American (1925, 1926); 2× First-team All-EIBL (1925, 1926); Second-team All-EIBL (1927)

Emanuel "Menchy" Goldblatt (November 3, 1904 – May 1, 1994) was an American basketball player and coach. While a member of the Penn Quakers men's basketball team in the 1920s he was a two-time Helms All-American.

== Early life ==
Goldblatt is a native of South Philadelphia, Pennsylvania.

== Playing career ==
Goldblatt was an All-American basketball player at the University of Pennsylvania from 1924 to 1927, primarily specializing in defense. He was an named to the All-Star team of the Eastern Intercollegiate League in 1925 and 1926. He was a Helms Foundation All-American selection in 1925 and 1926.

== Coaching career ==
After his playing career, Goldblatt was a basketball coach. He coached at John Bartram High School, becoming the first basketball coach in the early 1940s. He later became the head coach at Philadelphia College of Textiles and Science in 1948 and coached there until 1952.

== Halls of fame ==
Goldblatt is a member of the Philadelphia Jewish Sports Hall of Fame.

== Death ==
Goldblatt lived in Boulder, Colorado until his death in 1994. He is buried at Green Mountain Cemetery in Boulder.
