= 1924–25 Indiana Hoosiers men's basketball team =

American college basketball season

1924–25 Indiana Hoosiers men's basketball
- Conference: Big Ten Conference
- Record: 12–5 (8–4 Big Ten)
- Head coach: Everett Dean (1st season)
- Captain: Paul B. Parker
- Home arena: Men's Gymnasium

1924–25 Big Ten Conference men's basketball standings
	Conf.				Overall
Team	W		L	PCT	W		L	PCT
Ohio State	11	–	1	.917	14	–	2	.875
Indiana	8	–	4	.667	12	–	5	.706
Illinois	8	–	4	.667	11	–	6	.647
Purdue	7	–	4	.636	9	–	5	.643
Michigan	6	–	5	.545	8	–	6	.571
Minnesota	6	–	6	.500	9	–	7	.563
Iowa	5	–	7	.417	6	–	10	.375
Northwestern	4	–	8	.333	6	–	11	.353
Wisconsin	3	–	9	.250	6	–	11	.353
Chicago	1	–	11	.083	3	–	14	.176

The 1924–25 Indiana Hoosiers men's basketball team represented Indiana University. Their head coach was Everett Dean, who was in his first year. The team played its home games at the Men's Gymnasium in Bloomington, Indiana, and was a member of the Big Ten Conference.

The Hoosiers finished the regular season with an overall record of 12–5 and a conference record of 8–4, finishing 2nd in the Big Ten Conference.

== Roster ==
No.	Name	Position	Ht.	Year	Hometown
1	Ken Alward	G	5–8	Sr.	South Bend, Indiana
2	Harlan Logan	F	6–2	Sr.	Bloomington, Indiana
3	Paul B. Parker	C	6–7	Sr.	Kokomo, Indiana
6	Karl Bordner	C	6–1	Jr.	Brookston, Indiana
7	Max Lorber	G	5–3	Sr.	Columbia City, Indiana
8	Elton Harrison	F	5–11	Jr.	Lebanon, Indiana
18	Charles Benzel	G	5–8	So.	Bedford, Indiana
N/A	Art Beckner	G	6–1	So.	Muncie, Indiana
N/A	Emery Druckamiller	F	5–8	So.	Syracuse, Indiana
N/A	Millard Easton	G	6–1	Jr.	Sandborn, Indiana
N/A	Julius Krueger	F	6–1	So.	Bloomington, Indiana
N/A	Robert Nicholson	F	N/A	So.	Bloomington, Indiana
N/A	H.N. Replogle	F	5–8	So.	Muncie, Indiana
N/A	Lindley Ricketts	G	5–7	N/A	Lynnville, Indiana
N/A	Frank Sibley	C	6–2	So.	Gary, Indiana
N/A	Palmer Sponsler	G	6–1	Jr.	Bloomington, Indiana
N/A	Jack Winston	G/F	6–6	Jr.	Washington, Indiana

== Schedule/results ==
Date time, TV	Rank^{#}	Opponent^{#}	Result	Record	Site city, state
Regular season
12/11/1924*		Indiana State	L 24–28	0–1	Men's Gymnasium; Bloomington, Indiana
12/15/1924*		Washington (Mo.)	W 35–18	1–1	Men's Gymnasium; Bloomington, Indiana
12/18/1924*		at Kentucky; Indiana–Kentucky rivalry	W 20–18	2–1	Alumni Gymnasium; Lexington, Kentucky
1/3/1925*		Cincinnati	W 51–7	3–1	Men's Gymnasium; Bloomington, Indiana
1/6/1925*		Mercer	W 31–19	4–1	Men's Gymnasium; Bloomington, Indiana
1/10/1925		at Ohio State	L 22–30	4–2 (0–1)	Ohio Expo Center Coliseum; Columbus, Ohio
1/17/1925		at Illinois; Rivalry	L 24–34	4–3 (0–2)	Kenney Gym; Urbana, Illinois
1/24/1925		Chicago	W 40–11	5–3 (1–2)	Men's Gymnasium; Bloomington, Indiana
1/31/1925		at Iowa	W 30–28	6–3 (2–2)	Iowa Armory; Iowa City, IA
2/4/1925		Purdue; Rivalry	W 39–36	7–3 (3–2)	Men's Gymnasium; Bloomington, Indiana
2/9/1925		Iowa	W 28–21	8–3 (4–2)	Men's Gymnasium; Bloomington, Indiana
2/14/1925		at Michigan	W 29–28	9–3 (5–2)	Yost Field House; Ann Arbor, Michigan
2/21/1925		at Chicago	W 33–22	10–3 (6–2)	Bartlett Gymnasium; Chicago
2/23/1925		Illinois; Rivalry	W 30–24	11–3 (7–2)	Men's Gymnasium; Bloomington, Indiana
2/27/1925		at Purdue; Rivalry	L 29–38	11–4 (7–3)	Memorial Gymnasium; West Lafayette, Indiana
3/2/1925		Michigan	W 51–33	12–4 (8–3)	Men's Gymnasium; Bloomington, Indiana
3/7/1925		Ohio State	L 26–28	12–5 (8–4)	Men's Gymnasium; Bloomington, Indiana
*Non-conference game. ^{#}Rankings from AP Poll. (#) Tournament seedings in parentheses.
