= John M. Reed =

American sports coach

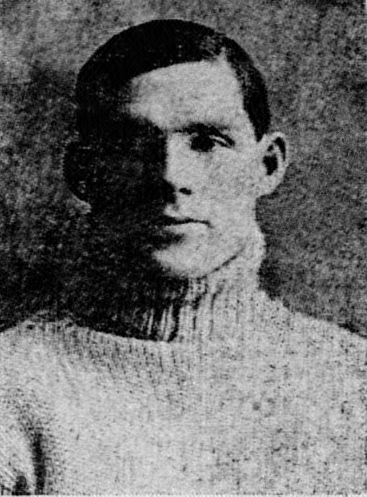
- Reed pictured in the Pittsburgh Daily Post, 1906

Biographical details
- Born: c. 1881; Middletown, Connecticut, U.S.
- Died: April 18, 1934 (aged 52); Worcester, Massachusetts, U.S.

Playing career

Football
- 1904: Holy Cross
- Position: Fullback

Coaching career (HC unless noted)

Football
- 1905: Alfred
- 1906–1909: Niagara
- 1910–1914: St. Lawrence
- 1915: Franklin & Marshall
- 1916–1919: RPI
- 1920–1924: Clarkson
- 1925–1933: Holy Cross (freshmen)

Basketball
- 1906–1908: Niagara
- 1916–1920: RPI
- 1925–1931: Holy Cross

Baseball
- 1916: Franklin & Marshall

Head coaching record
- Overall: 46–54–9 (football); 60–41 (basketball); 3–10 (basketball)

John M. Reed (c. 1881 – April 18, 1934) was an American football, basketball, and baseball coach. He served as the head football coach at Franklin & Marshall College in Lancaster, Pennsylvania. He held that position for the 1915 season. His coaching record at Franklin & Marshall was 6–2. Reed also coached at St. Lawrence University in 1914 and at Rensselaer Polytechnic Institute from 1916 to 1919. Reed coached the Niagara University men's basketball team from 1906 to 1908 as well as their football team.

Reed was born in Middletown, Connecticut. He died at the age of 52, on April 18, 1934, in Worcester, Massachusetts.

== Head coaching record ==
=== Football ===
Year	Team	Overall	Conference	Standing	Bowl/playoffs
Alfred Saxons (Independent) (1905)
1905	Alfred	3–5			
Alfred:		3–5			
Niagara Purple Eagles (Independent) (1906–1907)
1906	Niagara	4–2–2			
1907	Niagara	3–3–1			
Niagara:		7–5–3			
St. Lawrence Saints (Independent) (1911–1914)
1911	St. Lawrence	3–2			
1912	St. Lawrence	1–4			
1913	St. Lawrence	1–4–1			
1914	St. Lawrence	1–4			
St. Lawrence:		6–14–1			
Franklin & Marshall (Independent) (1915)
1915	Franklin & Marshall	6–2			
Franklin & Marshall:		6–2			
RPI Engineers (Independent) (1916–1919)
1916	RPI	3–6			
1917	RPI	3–4			
1918	RPI	1–1			
1919	RPI	3–4–1			
RPI:		9–15–1			
Clarkson Golden Knights (Independent) (1921–1924)
1921	Clarkson	4–4–1			
1922	Clarkson	5–3			
1923	Clarkson	2–4–2			
1924	Clarkson	4–2–1			
Clarkson:		15–13–4			
Total:		46–54–9			
