= Tusten Ackerman =

American basketball player (1901–1997)

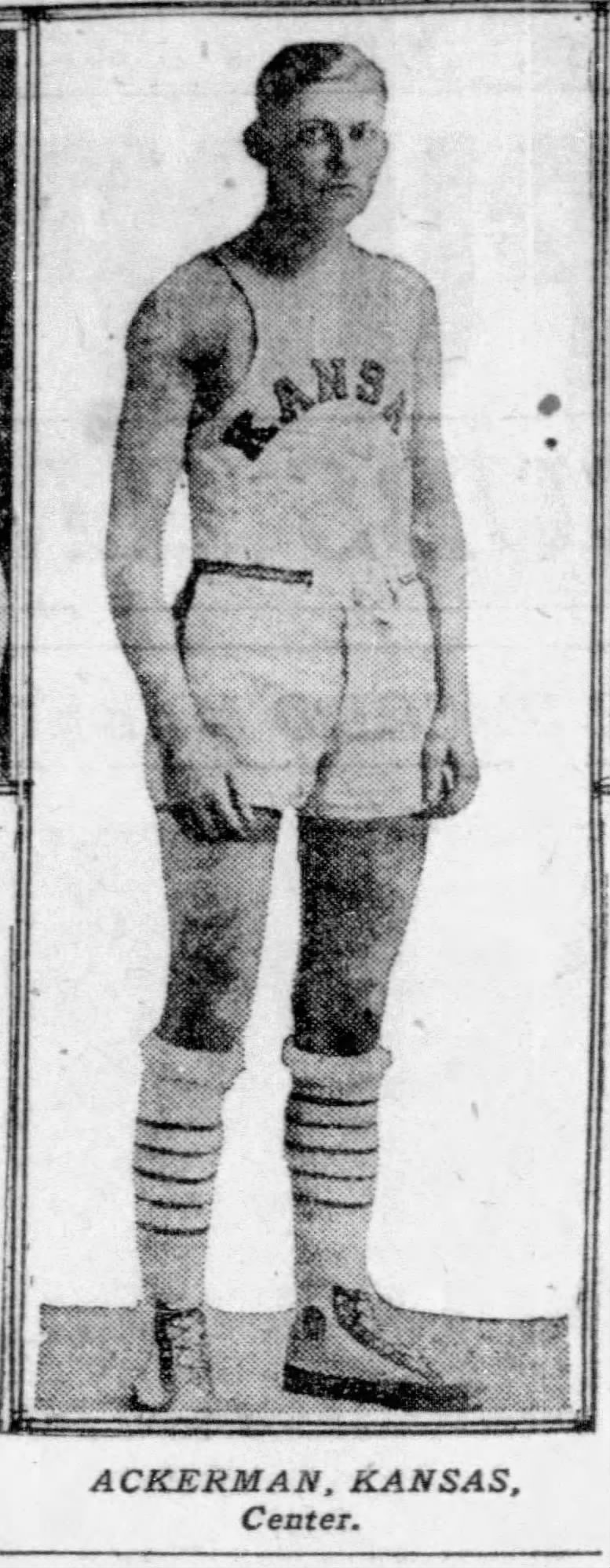

Personal information
- Born: October 7, 1901 Oklahoma, U.S.
- Died: May 17, 1997 (aged 95) Wichita, Kansas, U.S.
- Listed height: 6 ft 3 in (1.91 m)
- Listed weight: 170 lb (77 kg)

Career information
- High school: Lawrence (Lawrence, Kansas)
- College: Kansas (1922–1925)
- Position: Power forward / center
- Number: 7, 1

Career history
- 1925–1927: Kansas City Athletic Club

Career highlights
- 2× AAU All-American (1925, 1926); Helms National champion (1923); 2× Helms Foundation All-American (1924, 1925); 2× First-team All-MVC (2024, 2025); No. 7 jersey retired by Kansas Jayhawks

Arthur Tusten "Tus" Ackerman (October 7, 1901 – May 17, 1997) was an American basketball player in the early days of college and semi-professional basketball.

== Career ==
Ackerman, a 6'3 forward/center from Lawrence, Kansas, played for coach Phog Allen at Kansas from 1922 to 1925. At the University of Kansas, he was a starter on the 1922–23 Jayhawk team that was retroactively named national champions by the Helms Athletic Foundation and was named an All-American by that same organization for both 1924 and 1925.

Following his collegiate career, Ackerman played Amateur Athletic Union basketball for the Kansas City Athletic Club, where he was named an AAU All-American in 1925 and 1926.

== Legacy ==
Ackerman's jersey was retired by the University of Kansas and hangs in Allen Fieldhouse.
