= Ken Simendinger =

American baseball player (1899–1972)

Profile
- Position: Halfback

Personal information
- Born: October 23, 1899; Philadelphia, Pennsylvania, U.S.
- Died: May 26, 1972 (aged 72); Philadelphia, Pennsylvania, U.S.
- Listed height: 5 ft 10 in (1.78 m)
- Listed weight: 175 lb (79 kg)

Career information
- High school: La Salle College High School
- College: Holy Cross

Career history
- Waterbury Blues (1925); Hartford Blues (1925–1926)
- Stats at Pro Football Reference

Kenneth Alphonse Simendinger (October 23, 1899 – May 26, 1972) was an American professional football player in the National Football League (NFL) for the Hartford Blues in 1926. He also played for the Waterbury-Hartford Blues in 1924, prior to that team's entry into the NFL. While he was playing professional football, he was also a head college basketball coach at his alma mater, Holy Cross from 1924 until 1925.

Simendiger was born in Philadelphia, Pennsylvania, in 1899. He began high school at Central High School. He then moved to La Salle College High School in Wyndmoor, Pennsylvania in his junior year, where he excelled in football, basketball, and baseball. He played right halfback for the football team, leading the team to the school's first undefeated season in 1917. On the basketball team, he played guard and was the team captain. He graduated from LaSalle in 1918. He attended college at Lehigh University, and then at Holy Cross, playing football at both schools. At Holy Cross, Simendinger played three years of college football and baseball. He hit two home runs and a double in his baseball debut against Dartmouth College, earning him the nickname the “Babe Ruth of the Eastern Intercollegiates.”

After graduating, Simendinger was a head college basketball coach for his Holy Cross Crusaders basketball team. He was the only Crusader coach to have served for just one season, as after his first season, he became football coach at Gonzaga High School in Washington, D.C., where his team went undefeated and unscored upon in 1927.

Simendinger then went on to an outstanding coaching and teaching career at Northeast Catholic High School for Boys (North) in his home town of Philadelphia. He taught math at North for 40 years and coached their Falcon football team from 1930 through the 1940 seasons. His teams won a share of the Catholic League championship in four consecutive years, from 1934 to 1937. He coached future National Football League (NFL) stars such as Frank Reagan and Bucko Kilroy. He has the second-most football wins in school history (behind only Jack Gillespie) with an overall record of 62–22–12. Simendinger also coached the North Catholic basketball team to a league crown in 1935. He gave up coaching when his wife became ill.

He was inducted into the College of The Holy Cross Crusader Varsity Club Hall of Fame in 1958.

Simendinger died on May 26, 1972, in Philadelphia.
