= 1924–25 North Carolina Tar Heels men's basketball team =

American college basketball season

1924–25 North Carolina Tar Heels men's basketball
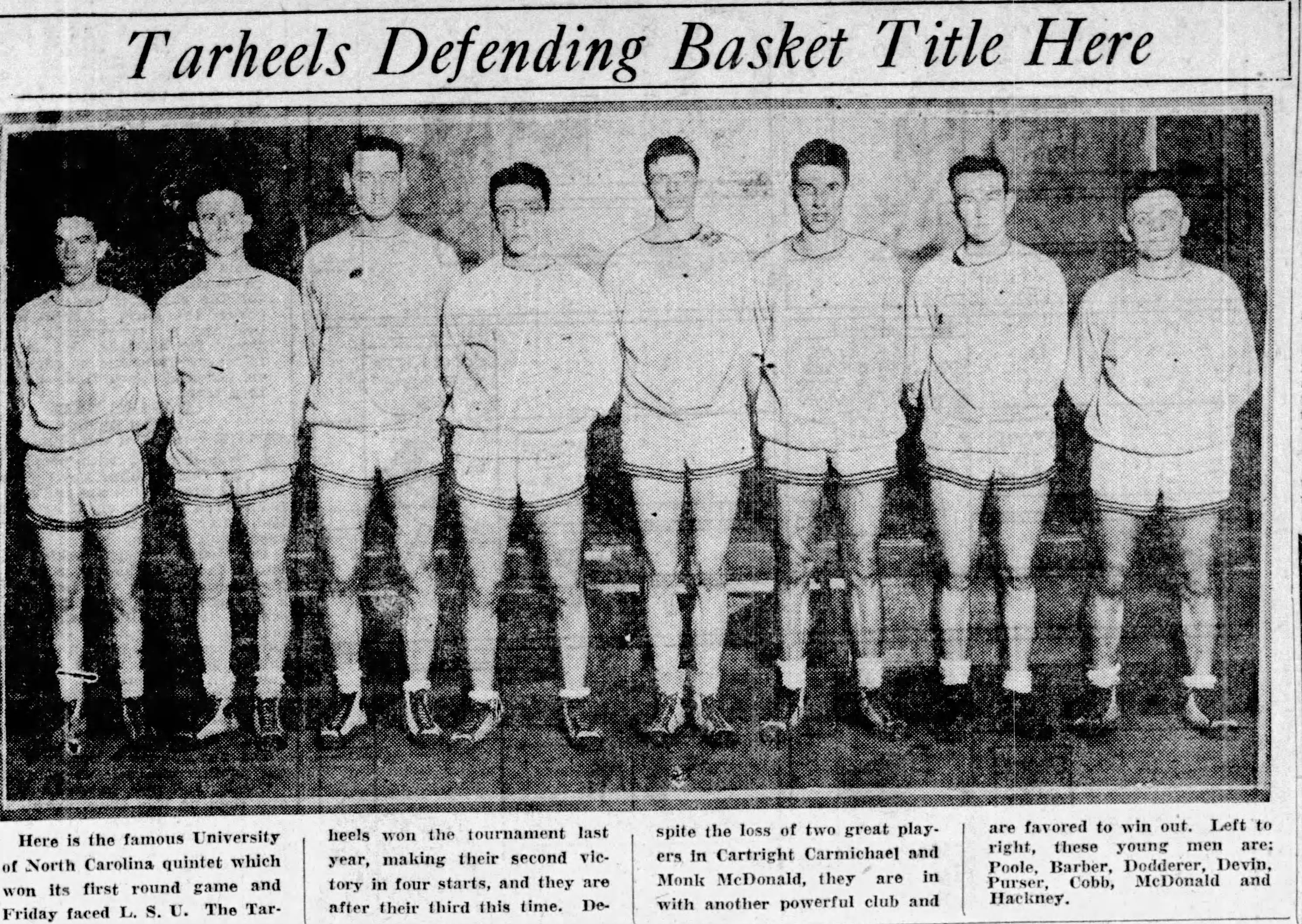

SoCon regular season champion SoCon Tournament Champion
- Conference: Southern Conference
- Record: 20–5 (8–0 SoCon)
- Head coach: Monk McDonald
- Captain: Jack Cobb
- Home arena: Tin Can

1924–25 Southern Conference men's basketball standings
	Conf.				Overall
Team	W		L	PCT	W		L	PCT
North Carolina†	8	–	0	1.000	20	–	5	.800
Tulane	12	–	3	.800	17	–	4	.810
Kentucky	6	–	2	.750	13	–	8	.619
Maryland	3	–	1	.750	12	–	5	.706
Alabama	5	–	2	.714	15	–	4	.789
Virginia	4	–	2	.667	14	–	3	.824
South Carolina	4	–	2	.667	10	–	7	.588
Washington and Lee	3	–	2	.600	8	–	5	.615
Clemson	3	–	2	.600	4	–	14	.222
Vanderbilt	4	–	3	.571	12	–	13	.480
Mississippi A&M	4	–	4	.500	14	–	9	.609
Georgia	4	–	4	.500	9	–	11	.450
Georgia Tech	2	–	7	.222	4	–	12	.250
NC State	1	–	4	.200	11	–	7	.611
LSU	1	–	4	.200	10	–	7	.588
Virginia Tech	1	–	4	.200	6	–	9	.400
Tennessee	1	–	5	.167	6	–	8	.429
Auburn	1	–	5	.167	3	–	11	.214
Mississippi	1	–	6	.143	17	–	8	.680
Florida	0	–	0	–	2	–	7	.222
Sewanee	0	–	0	–	2	–	7	.222
† Southern Conference Tournament winner

The 1924–25 North Carolina Tar Heels men's basketball team represented the University of North Carolina during the 1924–25 NCAA men's basketball season in the United States. The team finished the season with a 20–5 record and won the 1925 Southern Conference men's basketball tournament.
